= 1978 Yugoslavian motorcycle Grand Prix =

(Socialist Federal Republic of Yugoslavia) 1978 Yugoslavian Grand Prix
Race details
- Race 13 of 13 races in the 1978 Grand Prix motorcycle racing season
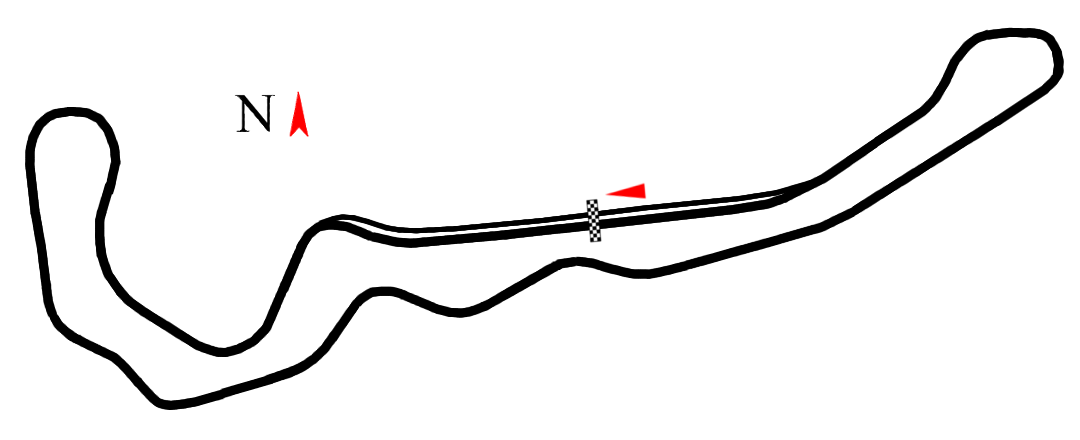
- Date: 17 September 1978
- Official name: Grand Prix de Yougoslavie
- Location: Staza Grobink Rijeka
- Course: Permanent racing facility; 4.168 km (2.590 mi)

350cc
Pole position
| Rider | (Australia) Gregg Hansford | Kawasaki |
| Time | 1:39.96 | |
Fastest lap
| Rider | (Australia) Gregg Hansford | Kawasaki |
| Time | 1:38.0 | |
Podium
| First | (Australia) Gregg Hansford | Kawasaki |
| Second | (Italy) Franco Bonera | Yamaha |
| Third | (France) Patrick Fernandez | Yamaha |

250cc
Pole position
| Rider | (South Africa) Kork Ballington | Kawasaki |
| Time | 1:42.86 | |
Fastest lap
| Rider | (West Germany) Anton Mang | Kawasaki |
| Time | 1:39.0 | |
Podium
| First | (Australia) Gregg Hansford | Kawasaki |
| Second | (West Germany) Anton Mang | Kawasaki |
| Third | (South Africa) Kork Ballington | Kawasaki |

125cc
Pole position
| Rider | (France) Thierry Espié | Motobécane |
| Time | 1:43.70 | |
Fastest lap
| Rider | (France) Patrick Plisson | Morbidelli |
| Time | 1:43.2 | |
Podium
| First | (Spain) Ángel Nieto | Minarelli |
| Second | (Switzerland) Hans Müller | Morbidelli |
| Third | (Italy) Pierluigi Conforti | Morbidelli |

50cc
Pole position
| Rider | (Italy) Eugenio Lazzarini | Kreidler |
| Time | 1:54.93 | |
Fastest lap
| Rider | (Spain) Ricardo Tormo | Bultaco |
| Time | 1:52.86 | |
Podium
| First | (Spain) Ricardo Tormo | Bultaco |
| Second | (Italy) Eugenio Lazzarini | Kreidler |
| Third | (France) Patrick Plisson | ABF |

The 1978 Yugoslavian motorcycle Grand Prix was the thirteenth and final round of the 1978 Grand Prix motorcycle racing season. It took place on 17 September 1978 at the Staza Grobnik Rijeka.

== 350 cc classification ==
| Pos | Rider | Manufacturer | Laps | Time | Grid | Points |
|---|---|---|---|---|---|---|
| 1 | (Australia) Gregg Hansford | Kawasaki | 35 | 58:21.2 | 1 | 15 |
| 2 | (Italy) Franco Bonera | Yamaha | 35 | +7.3 | 4 | 12 |
| 3 | (France) Patrick Fernandez | Yamaha | 35 | +21.2 | 2 | 10 |
| 4 | (Australia) Vic Soussan | Yamaha | 35 | +24.5 | 5 | 8 |
| 5 | (South Africa) Jon Ekerold | Yamaha | 35 | +31.8 | 11 | 6 |
| 6 | (West Germany) Anton Mang | Kawasaki | 35 | +32.2 | 12 | 5 |
| 7 | (France) Olivier Chevallier | Yamaha | 35 | +1:40.0 | 8 | 4 |
| 8 | (Italy) Vanes Francini | Yamaha | 35 | +1:44.4 | 14 | 3 |
| 9 | (Italy) Giovanni Pellettier | Yamaha | 34 | +1 lap | 16 | 2 |
| 10 | (Switzerland) Roland Freymond | Yamaha | 34 | +1 lap | 15 | 1 |
| 11 | (Italy) Mario Lega | Morbidelli | 34 | +1 lap | 10 | |
| 12 | (Italy) Giovanni Rolando | Yamaha | 34 | +1 lap | | |
| 13 | (Italy) Franco Marcheggiani | Yamaha | 34 | +1 lap | | |
| 14 | (Japan) Y. Matsumoto | Yamaha | 34 | +1 lap | | |
| 15 | (Sweden) Peter Sjoström | Yamaha | 33 | +2 laps | | |
| | (South Africa) Kork Ballington | Kawasaki | | | 3 | |
| | (United Kingdom) Tom Herron | Yamaha | | | 6 | |
| | (France) Hervé Moineau | Yamaha | | | 7 | |
| | (Italy) Pierluigi Conforti | Yamaha | | | 9 | |
| | (Italy) Paolo Pileri | Morbidelli | | | 13 | |
| | (Switzerland) Bruno Kneubühler | Yamaha | | | 17 | |
| | (Finland) Pentti Korhonen | Yamaha | | | 18 | |
| | (Italy) Sauro Pazzaglia | Yamaha | | | 19 | |
| | (Sweden) Leif Gustafsson | Yamaha | | | 20 | |
30 starters in total

== 250 cc classification ==
| Pos | Rider | Manufacturer | Laps | Time | Grid | Points |
|---|---|---|---|---|---|---|
| 1 | (Australia) Gregg Hansford | Kawasaki | 29 | 49:28.98 | 2 | 15 |
| 2 | (West Germany) Anton Mang | Kawasaki | 29 | +4.00 | 13 | 12 |
| 3 | (South Africa) Kork Ballington | Kawasaki | 29 | +4.31 | 1 | 10 |
| 4 | (Italy) Paolo Pileri | Morbidelli | 29 | +12.91 | 4 | 8 |
| 5 | (South Africa) Jon Ekerold | Yamaha | 29 | +31.68 | 6 | 6 |
| 6 | (France) Patrick Fernandez | Yamaha | 29 | +31.93 | 3 | 5 |
| 7 | (Italy) Mario Lega | Morbidelli | 29 | +44.34 | 5 | 4 |
| 8 | (Finland) Pentti Korhonen | Yamaha | 29 | +1:23.02 | 7 | 3 |
| 9 | (Switzerland) Roland Freymond | Yamaha | 29 | +1:40.90 | 18 | 2 |
| 10 | (Finland) Eero Hyvärinen | Yamaha | 29 | +1:41.16 | 12 | 1 |
| 11 | (Switzerland) Hans Müller | Yamaha | 29 | +1:43.85 | 15 | |
| 12 | (Italy) Giovanni Pellettier | Yamaha | 28 | +1 lap | | |
| 13 | (Italy) Vanes Francini | Yamaha | 28 | +1 lap | | |
| 14 | (West Germany) Bernd Tüngethal | Yamaha | 28 | +1 lap | | |
| 15 | (Italy) Franco Marcheggiani | Yamaha | 28 | +1 lap | | |
| 16 | (Italy) Giorgio Avveduti | Yamaha | 28 | +1 lap | 19 | |
| 17 | (Belgium) Renè Delaby | Yamaha | 28 | +1 lap | | |
| 18 | (Belgium) Olivier Liegeois | Yamaha | 28 | +1 lap | | |
| | (France) Olivier Chevallier | Yamaha | | | 8 | |
| | (Australia) Vic Soussan | Yamaha | | | 9 | |
| | (United Kingdom) Tom Herron | Yamaha | | | 10 | |
| | (France) Thierry Espié | Yamaha | | | 11 | |
| | (Italy) Sauro Pazzaglia | Yamaha | | | 14 | |
| | (Sweden) Leif Gustafsson | Yamaha | | | 16 | |
| | (France) Hervé Moineau | Yamaha | | | 17 | |
30 starters in total

== 125 cc classification ==
| Pos | Rider | Manufacturer | Laps | Time | Grid | Points |
|---|---|---|---|---|---|---|
| 1 | (Spain) Ángel Nieto | Minarelli | 25 | 44:33.3 | 2 | 15 |
| 2 | (Switzerland) Hans Müller | Morbidelli | 25 | +10.8 | 4 | 12 |
| 3 | (Italy) Pierluigi Conforti | Morbidelli | 25 | +11.1 | 3 | 10 |
| 4 | (Austria) Harald Bartol | Morbidelli | 25 | +23.6 | 9 | 8 |
| 5 | (Italy) Maurizio Massimiani | Morbidelli | 25 | +41.4 | 13 | 6 |
| 6 | (France) Jean-Louis Guignabodet | Morbidelli | 25 | +41.7 | 10 | 5 |
| 7 | (Finland) Matti Kinnunen | Morbidelli | 25 | +45.8 | 7 | 4 |
| 8 | (Sweden) Per-Edward Carlson | Morbidelli | 25 | +56.4 | 14 | 3 |
| 9 | (France) Patrick Plisson | Morbidelli | 25 | +57.7 | 16 | 2 |
| 10 | (France) Thierry Noblesse | Morbidelli | 25 | +1:04.4 | 6 | 1 |
| 11 | (Monaco) P. Herouard | Morbidelli | 25 | +1:14.0 | 11 | |
| 12 | (Switzerland) Stefan Dörflinger | Morbidelli | 25 | +1:24.2 | 8 | |
| 13 | (Switzerland) Rolf Blatter | Morbidelli | 25 | +1:50.8 | 15 | |
| 14 | (Italy) Claudio Lusuardi | Morbidelli | 24 | +1 lap | | |
| 15 | (Netherlands) Henk van Kessel | Condor | 24 | +1 lap | 18 | |
| 16 | (Italy) Enrico Cereda | Morbidelli | 24 | +1 lap | 20 | |
| 17 | (Italy) Maurizio Musco | Morbidelli | 24 | +1 lap | 19 | |
| 18 | (Netherlands) Theo Timmer | Morbidelli | 24 | +1 lap | | |
| 19 | (Italy) Luigi Rinaudo | Morbidelli | 24 | +1 lap | | |
| 20 | (West Germany) Hagen Klein | Morbidelli | 23 | +2 laps | | |
| 21 | (Socialist Federal Republic of Yugoslavia) Boris Bajc | Morbidelli | 23 | +2 laps | | |
| | (France) Thierry Espié | Motobécane | | | 1 | |
| | (Italy) Eugenio Lazzarini | MBA | | | 5 | |
| | (Austria) August Auinger | Morbidelli | | | 12 | |
| | (Italy) Italo Zerbini | Morbidelli | | | 17 | |
30 starters in total

== 50 cc classification ==
| Pos | Rider | Manufacturer | Laps | Time | Grid | Points |
|---|---|---|---|---|---|---|
| 1 | (Spain) Ricardo Tormo | Bultaco | 20 | 38:15.02 | 2 | 15 |
| 2 | (Italy) Eugenio Lazzarini | Kreidler | 20 | +14.58 | 1 | 12 |
| 3 | (France) Patrick Plisson | ABF | 20 | +1:24.47 | 4 | 10 |
| 4 | (Switzerland) Rolf Blatter | Kreidler | 20 | +1:25.27 | 7 | 8 |
| 5 | (West Germany) Ingo Emmerich | Kreidler | 20 | +1:42.95 | 6 | 6 |
| 6 | (West Germany) Hagen Klein | Kreidler | 20 | +1:52.26 | 11 | 5 |
| 7 | (West Germany) Wolfgang Müller | Kreidler | 20 | +1:53.48 | 5 | 4 |
| 8 | (Italy) Enrico Cereda | DRS | 19 | +1 lap | 10 | 3 |
| 9 | (West Germany) Reiner Scheidhauer | Kreidler | 19 | +1 lap | 8 | 2 |
| 10 | (Italy) Aldo Pero | Kreidler | 19 | +1 lap | 9 | 1 |
| 11 | (Netherlands) Peter Looyenstein | Kreidler | 19 | +1 lap | 13 | |
| 12 | (Netherlands) Henk van Kessel | Sparta | 19 | +1 lap | 14 | |
| 13 | (France) Bruno di Carlo | Kreidler | 19 | +1 lap | 20 | |
| 14 | (Belgium) Chris Baert | Kreidler | 19 | +1 lap | | |
| 15 | (Italy) S. Zattoni | LGM | 19 | +1 lap | | |
| 16 | (Italy) Ezio Mischiatti | LGM | 18 | +2 laps | | |
| 17 | (Austria) Otto Machinek | Kreidler | 18 | +2 laps | | |
| | (Switzerland) Stefan Dörflinger | Kreidler | | | 3 | |
| | (West Germany) Günter Schirnhofer | Kreidler | | | 12 | |
| | (Netherlands) Theo Timmer | Kreidler | | | 15 | |
| | (Italy) Claudio Lusuardi | Kreidler | | | 16 | |
| | (Socialist Federal Republic of Yugoslavia) "Krstic" | Kreidler | | | 17 | |
| | (Austria) Hans Hummel | Kreidler | | | 18 | |
| | (France) Benjamin Laurent | FBM | | | 19 | |
30 starters in total

| Previous race: 1978 Czechoslovak Grand Prix | FIM Grand Prix World Championship; 1978 season | Next race: 1979 Venezuelan Grand Prix |
| Previous race: 1977 Yugoslavian Grand Prix | Yugoslavian Grand Prix | Next race: 1979 Yugoslavian Grand Prix |
