= 1978 Finnish motorcycle Grand Prix =

Two wheeled motorsports event in Finland

(Finland) 1978 Finnish Grand Prix
Race details
- Race 9 of 13 races in the 1978 Grand Prix motorcycle racing season
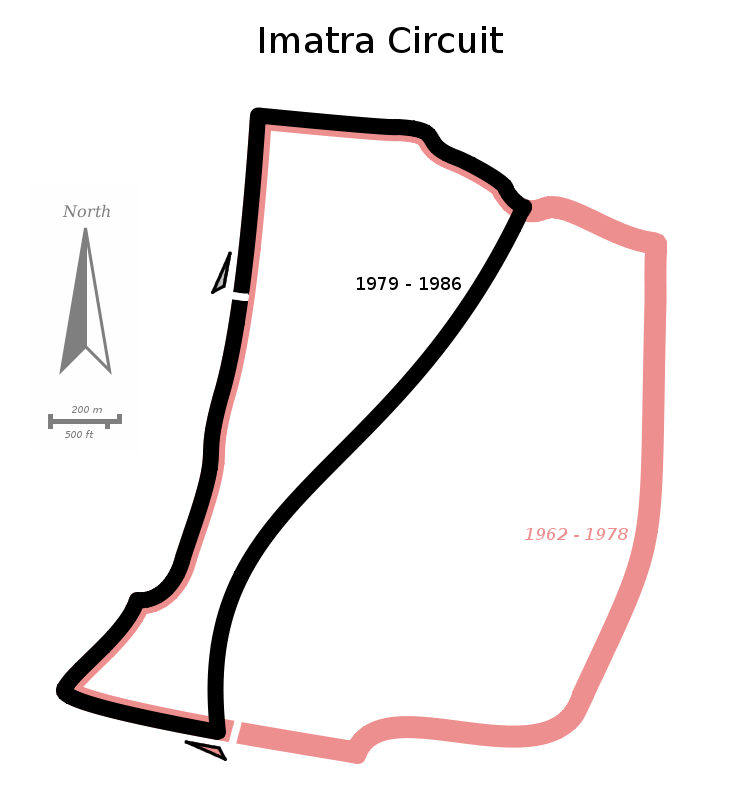
- Date: 30 July 1978
- Official name: Imatranajo
- Location: Imatra Circuit
- Course: Public roads; 6.030 km (3.747 mi)

500cc
Pole position
- Rider: (Venezuela) Johnny Cecotto
- Time: 2:10.400
Fastest lap
- Rider: (Venezuela) Johnny Cecotto
- Time: 2:08.700
Podium
- First: (Netherlands) Wil Hartog
- Second: (Japan) Takazumi Katayama
- Third: (Venezuela) Johnny Cecotto

350cc
Pole position
- Rider: (South Africa) Kork Ballington
- Time: 2:14.900
Fastest lap
- Rider: (Japan) Takazumi Katayama
- Time: 2:13.800
Podium
- First: (South Africa) Kork Ballington
- Second: (Japan) Takazumi Katayama
- Third: (United Kingdom) Tom Herron

250cc
Pole position
- Rider: (Australia) Gregg Hansford
- Time: 2:18.300
Fastest lap
- Rider: (South Africa) Kork Ballington
- Time: 2:17.400
Podium
- First: (South Africa) Kork Ballington
- Second: (Australia) Gregg Hansford
- Third: (Italy) Mario Lega

125cc
Pole position
- Rider: (Italy) Eugenio Lazzarini
- Time: 2:25.50
Fastest lap
- Rider: (Spain) Ángel Nieto
- Time: 2:24.200
Podium
- First: (Spain) Ángel Nieto
- Second: (Italy) Eugenio Lazzarini
- Third: (Austria) Harald Bartol

The 1978 Finnish motorcycle Grand Prix was the ninth round of the 1978 Grand Prix motorcycle racing season. It took place on 30 July 1978 at the Imatra circuit.

== 500cc classification ==
Pos.	Rider	Team	Manufacturer	Time/Retired	Points
1	(Netherlands) Wil Hartog	Riemersma Racing	Suzuki	45'44.100	15
2	(Japan) Takazumi Katayama	Sarome & Motul Team	Yamaha	+4.800	12
3	(Venezuela) Johnny Cecotto	Yamaha Motor Company	Yamaha	+11.400	10
4	(Finland) Tepi Länsivuori		Suzuki	+43.700	8
5	(United Kingdom) Steve Parrish		Suzuki	+58.400	6
6	(United States) Steve Baker	Team Gallina Nava Olio Fiat	Suzuki	+1'04.700	5
7	(Netherlands) Boet van Dulmen		Suzuki	+1'11.700	4
8	(West Germany) Jürgen Steiner	Caramba Racing Team Bohme	Suzuki	+1'23.300	4
9	(Italy) Graziano Rossi	Team Gallina Nava Olio Fiat	Suzuki	+2'27.100	2
10	(Switzerland) Bruno Kneubühler	RSS Racing Team	Suzuki	+1 lap	1
11	(United Kingdom) Clive Padgett		Suzuki	+1 lap	
12	(Austria) Max Wiener		Suzuki	+1 lap	
13	(Netherlands) Dick Alblas		Suzuki	+1 lap	
14	(West Germany) Gerhard Vogt	Bill Smith Racing	Suzuki	+1 lap	
15	(Denmark) Børge Nielsen		Suzuki	+1 lap	
16	(Finland) Ilkka Jaakkola		Yamaha	+2 laps	
Ret	(Italy) Marco Lucchinelli	Cagiva Corse	Suzuki	Retired	
Ret	(United Kingdom) Barry Sheene	Texaco Heron Team Suzuki	Suzuki	Retired	
Ret	(Finland) Timo Haarala		Yamaha	Retired	
Ret	(United Kingdom) Alex George		Suzuki	Retired	
Ret	(Sweden) Bo Granath		Suzuki	Retired	
Ret	(New Zealand) Dennis Ireland		Suzuki	Retired	
Ret	(West Germany) Franz Rau	Kazenmaier Autovermietung	Suzuki	Retired	
Ret	(West Germany) Harry Hoffman	Manila Disco Racing	Suzuki	Retired	
Ret	(New Zealand) John Woodley	Sid Griffiths Racing	Suzuki	Retired	
Ret	(United States) Kenny Roberts	Yamaha Motor Company	Yamaha	Retired	
Ret	(Sweden) Lars Johansson		Yamaha	Retired	
Ret	(South Africa) Leslie van Breda		Suzuki	Retired	
Ret	(Finland) Markku Matikäinen		Suzuki	Retired	
Ret	(France) Michel Rougerie		Suzuki	Accident	
Ret	(Finland) Pentti Lehtelä		Yamaha	Accident	
Ret	(Italy) Virginio Ferrari	Team Gallina Nava Olio Fiat	Suzuki	Retired	

== 350 cc classification ==
Pos	Rider	Manufacturer	Laps	Time	Grid	Points
1	(South Africa) Kork Ballington	Kawasaki	20	45:33.2	1	15
2	(Japan) Takazumi Katayama	Yamaha	20	+3.2	9	12
3	(United Kingdom) Tom Herron	Yamaha	20	+35.8	19	10
4	(Australia) Vic Soussan	Yamaha	20	+36.9	6	8
5	(South Africa) Jon Ekerold	Yamaha	20	+44.7	5	6
6	(France) Guy Bertin	Yamaha	20	+49.0	7	5
7	(France) Michel Rougerie	Yamaha	20	+50.7	2	4
8	(France) Olivier Chevallier	Yamaha	20	+1:10.4	10	3
9	(Italy) Paolo Pileri	Morbidelli	20	+1:10.8	8	2
10	(Finland) Eero Hyvärinen	Yamaha	20	+1:12.2		1
11	(Switzerland) Bruno Kneubühler	Yamaha	20	+1:35.8		
12	(Switzerland) Michel Frutschi	Yamaha	20	+1:45.8	12	
13	(Finland) Seppo Rossi	Yamaha	20	+2:09.8		
14	(Finland) Reino Eskelinen	Yamaha	20	+2:22.4		
15	(South Africa) Les van Breda	Yamaha	19	+1 lap		
	(Australia) Gregg Hansford	Kawasaki			3	
	(West Germany) Anton Mang	Kawasaki			4	
	(Italy) Marco Lucchinelli	Harley-Davidson			11	
	(United Kingdom) Mick Grant	Kawasaki			13	
	(Sweden) Leif Gustafsson	Yamaha			14	
	(United Kingdom) Chas Mortimer	Yamaha			15	
	(France) Patrick Fernandez	Yamaha			16	
	(France) Christian Sarron	Yamaha			17	
	(France) Patrick Pons	Yamaha			18	
	(Finland) Pentti Korhonen	Yamaha			20	
35 starters in total

== 250 cc classification ==
Pos	Rider	Manufacturer	Laps	Time	Grid	Points
1	(South Africa) Kork Ballington	Kawasaki	19	43:56.5	2	15
2	(Australia) Gregg Hansford	Kawasaki	19	+29.2	1	12
3	(Italy) Mario Lega	Morbidelli	19	+33.4	3	10
4	(West Germany) Anton Mang	Kawasaki	19	+42.5	7	8
5	(Italy) Paolo Pileri	Morbidelli	19	+51.2	6	6
6	(France) Jean-François Baldé	Kawasaki	19	+51.5	12	5
7	(United Kingdom) Mick Grant	Kawasaki	19	+1:03.7	10	4
8	(United Kingdom) Tom Herron	Yamaha	19	+1:04.1	5	3
9	(Australia) John Dodds	Yamaha	19	+1:10.3	16	2
10	(South Africa) Jon Ekerold	Morbidelli	19	+1:30.4	11	1
11	(France) Olivier Chevallier	Yamaha	19	+1:30.7	8	
12	(Finland) Pentti Korhonen	Yamaha	19	+1:55.3		
13	(Sweden) Leif Gustafsson	Yamaha	19	+2:04.1	13	
14	(France) Hervé Moineau	Yamaha	18	+1 lap		
15	(United Kingdom) Clive Padgett	Yamaha	18	+1 lap		
16	(Switzerland) Roland Freymond	Yamaha	18	+1 lap		
17	(Finland) Reino Eskelinen	Yamaha	18	+1 lap		
18	(Finland) S. Torvinen	Yamaha	18	+1 lap		
	(United States) Kenny Roberts	Yamaha			4	
	(France) Patrick Fernandez	Yamaha			9	
	(United Kingdom) Chas Mortimer	Yamaha			14	
	(Italy) Walter Villa	MBA			15	
	(Australia) Vic Soussan	Yamaha			17	
	(Finland) Pekka Nurmi	Yamaha			18	
	(Austria) Harald Bartol	Yamaha			19	
	(France) Raymond Roche	Yamaha			20	
36 starters in total

== 125 cc classification ==
Pos	Rider	Manufacturer	Laps	Time	Grid	Points
1	(Spain) Ángel Nieto	Minarelli	18	43:55.6	4	15
2	(Italy) Eugenio Lazzarini	MBA	18	+0.9	1	12
3	(Austria) Harald Bartol	Morbidelli	18	+56.8	6	10
4	(France) Jean-Louis Guignabodet	Morbidelli	18	+1:14.3	14	8
5	(Switzerland) Stefan Dörflinger	Morbidelli	18	+1:19.0	7	6
6	(Switzerland) Hans Müller	Morbidelli	18	+1:22.9	5	5
7	(France) Thierry Espié	Motobécane	18	+1:23.1	3	4
8	(Sweden) Per-Edward Carlson	Morbidelli	18	+1:23.6	10	3
9	(West Germany) Walter Koschine	Bender	18	+1:39.3	16	2
10	(United Kingdom) Clive Horton	Morbidelli	18	+2:01.3	17	1
11	(France) Patrick Plisson	Morbidelli	18	+2:04.5	8	
12	(France) Thierry Noblesse	Morbidelli	18	+2:32.3	13	
13	(Monaco) P. Herouard	Morbidelli	18	+3:13.1		
14	(France) François Granon	Morbidelli	17	+1 lap	20	
15	(Switzerland) Karl Fuchs	Morbidelli	17	+1 lap		
16	(Sweden) Johnny Wickström	Morbidelli	17	+1 lap		
17	(Sweden) Roland Olsson	Starol	17	+1 lap		
18	(Finland) J. Valaskari	Yamaha	15	+3 laps		
	(Italy) Pierpaolo Bianchi	Minarelli			2	
	(Finland) Matti Kinnunen	Morbidelli			9	
	(Italy) Maurizio Massimiani	Morbidelli			11	
	(Sweden) Bengt-Göran Johansson	Morbidelli			12	
	(Italy) Enrico Cereda	Morbidelli			15	
	(Austria) August Auinger	Morbidelli			18	
	(Netherlands) Bennie Wilbers	Morbidelli			19	
32 starters in total

Previous race: 1978 Swedish Grand Prix	FIM Grand Prix World Championship; 1978 season	Next race: 1978 British Grand Prix
Previous race: 1977 Finnish Grand Prix	Finnish Grand Prix	Next race: 1979 Finnish Grand Prix
