= 1978 Austrian motorcycle Grand Prix =

(Austria) 1978 Austrian Grand Prix
Race details
- Race 3 of 13 races in the 1978 Grand Prix motorcycle racing season
- Date: 30 April 1978
- Official name: Großer Preis von Österreich
- Location: Salzburgring
- Course: Permanent racing facility; 4.241 km (2.635 mi)

500cc
Pole position
- Rider: (Venezuela) Johnny Cecotto
- Time: 1:21.520
Fastest lap
- Rider: (United States) Kenny Roberts
- Time: 1:21.700
Podium
- First: (United States) Kenny Roberts
- Second: (Venezuela) Johnny Cecotto
- Third: (United Kingdom) Barry Sheene

350cc
Pole position
- Rider: (South Africa) Kork Ballington
- Time: 1:26.200
Fastest lap
- Rider: (South Africa) Kork Ballington
- Time: 1:25.720
Podium
- First: (South Africa) Kork Ballington
- Second: (Italy) Franco Uncini
- Third: (Japan) Takazumi Katayama

125cc
Pole position
- Rider: (Italy) Eugenio Lazzarini
- Time: 1:33.840
Fastest lap
- Rider: (Italy) Eugenio Lazzarini
- Time: 1:32.980
Podium
- First: (Italy) Eugenio Lazzarini
- Second: (Austria) Harald Bartol
- Third: (Italy) Pier paolo Bianchi

Sidecar (B2A)
Pole position
- Rider: (Switzerland) Rolf Biland
- Passenger: (United Kingdom) Kenny Williams
- Time: 1:32.540
Fastest lap
- Rider: (West Germany) Werner Schwärzel
- Passenger: (West Germany) Andreas Huber
- Time: 1:30.650
Podium
- First rider: (Switzerland) Rolf Biland
- First passenger: (United Kingdom) Kenny Williams
- Second rider: (United Kingdom) Mac Hobson
- Second passenger: (United Kingdom) Kenny Birch
- Third rider: (France) Alain Michel
- Third passenger: (United Kingdom) Stu Collins

The 1978 Austrian motorcycle Grand Prix was the third round of the 1978 Grand Prix motorcycle racing season. It took place on the weekend of 28–30 April 1978 at the Salzburgring.

== Classification ==
=== 500 cc ===
Pos.	Rider	Team	Manufacturer	Time/Retired	Points
1	(United States) Kenny Roberts	Yamaha Motor Company	Yamaha	48'30.300	15
2	(Venezuela) Johnny Cecotto	Yamaha Motor Company	Yamaha	+16.460	12
3	(United Kingdom) Barry Sheene	Texaco Heron Team Suzuki	Suzuki	+46.230	10
4	(Italy) Marco Lucchinelli	Cagiva Corse	Suzuki	+1'13.760	8
5	(Finland) Tepi Länsivuori		Suzuki	+1'17.340	6
6	(France) Michel Rougerie		Suzuki	+1 lap	5
7	(Netherlands) Wil Hartog	Riemersma Racing	Suzuki	+1 lap	4
8	(Netherlands) Boet van Dulmen		Suzuki	+1 lap	3
9	(Italy) Franco Bonera	Team Kiwi Yamoto	Suzuki	+1 lap	2
10	(Switzerland) Bruno Kneubühler	RSS Racing Team	Suzuki	+1 lap	1
11	(Switzerland) Philippe Coulon	Marlboro Nava Total	Suzuki	+1 lap	
12	(South Africa) Leslie van Breda		Suzuki	+1 lap	
13	(West Germany) Helmut Kassner		Suzuki	+1 lap	
14	(West Germany) Jürgen Steiner	Caramba Racing Team Bohme	Suzuki	+2 laps	
15	(West Germany) Franz Heller	Caramba Racing Team Bohme	Suzuki	+2 laps	
16	(Sweden) Bo Granath		Suzuki	+2 laps	
17	(Finland) Markku Matikäinen		Suzuki	+2 laps	
18	(West Germany) Franz Rau	Kazenmaier Autovermietung	Suzuki	+2 laps	
19	(Austria) Michael Schmid		Suzuki	+2 laps	
Ret	(United States) Steve Baker	Team Gallina Nava Olio Fiat	Suzuki	Accident	
	(Italy) Virginio Ferrari	Team Gallina Nava Olio Fiat	Suzuki	Retired	
Ret	(United States) Pat Hennen		Suzuki	Retired	
Ret	(Japan) Alex George	Sarome & Motul Team	Yamaha	Retired	
Ret	(United Kingdom) John Newbold	Ray Hamblin Motorcycles	Suzuki	Retired	
Ret	(Austria) Werner Nenning	Mobel Nenning Racing Team	Suzuki	Retired	
Ret	(Japan) Takazumi Katayama	Sarome & Motul Team	Yamaha	Retired	
Ret	(Spain) Carlos Delgado de San Antonio		Suzuki	Retired	
Ret	(Belgium) Jean-Philippe Orban	Team La Licorne	Suzuki	Accident	
Ret	(United Kingdom) Steve Parrish		Suzuki	Retired	
Ret	(Italy) Walter Villa		Suzuki	Retired	
Ret	(Netherlands) Jack Middelburg		Suzuki	Accident	
Ret	(United Kingdom) Tom Herron		Suzuki	Retired	
Ret	(South Africa) Jon Ekerold	Suzuki Deutschland	Suzuki	Retired	
Ret	(Austria) Max Wiener		Suzuki	Retired	
Ret	(Austria) Hans Braumandl		Suzuki	Retired	
Ret	(Denmark) Børge Nielsen		Suzuki	Retired	

=== 350cc ===
Pos	Rider	Manufacturer	Laps	Time	Grid	Points
1	(South Africa) Kork Ballington	Kawasaki	35	50:38.28	1	15
2	(Italy) Franco Uncini	Yamaha	35	+14.37	2	12
3	(Japan) Takazumi Katayama	Yamaha	35	+18.19	3	10
4	(South Africa) Jon Ekerold	Yamaha	35	+46.73	12	8
5	(France) Olivier Chevallier	Yamaha	35	+59.64	4	6
6	(France) Michel Rougerie	Yamaha	35	+1:05.34	17	5
7	(Australia) Gregg Hansford	Kawasaki	35	+1:12.82	6	4
8	(Finland) Pentti Korhonen	Yamaha	35	+1:13.94	20	3
9	(Australia) Vic Soussan	Yamaha	35	+1:14.11	15	2
10	(Italy) Franco Bonera	Yamaha	35	+1:14.34	16	1
11	(France) Patrick Fernandez	Yamaha	35	+1:14.67	8	
12	(United Kingdom) Chas Mortimer	Yamaha	35	+1:18.98	7	
13	(Australia) John Dodds	Yamaha	34	+1 lap		
14	(Austria) Edi Stöllinger	Yamaha	34	+1 lap	19	
15	(Switzerland) Michel Frutschi	Yamaha	34	+1 lap		
16	(Australia) Kenny Blake	Yamaha	34	+1 lap		
17	(Switzerland) Roland Freymond	Yamaha	34	+1 lap		
18	(Austria) Ernst Fagerer	Yamaha	34	+1 lap		
19	(South Africa) Les van Breda	Yamaha	34	+1 lap		
20	(West Germany) Josef Hage	Yamaha	34	+1 lap		
21	(Italy) Franco Solaroli	Yamaha	34	+1 lap		
22	(Czechoslovakia) Peter Baláz	Yamaha	34	+1 lap		
	(Sweden) Leif Gustafsson	Yamaha			5	
	(United Kingdom) Mick Grant	Kawasaki			9	
	(United Kingdom) Tom Herron	Yamaha			10	
	(Italy) Pierluigi Conforti	Yamaha			11	
	(West Germany) Anton Mang	Kawasaki			13	
	(Finland) Pekka Nurmi	Yamaha			14	
	(France) Christian Sarron	Yamaha			18	
36 starters in total

=== 125cc ===
Pos	Rider	Manufacturer	Laps	Time	Grid	Points
1	(Italy) Eugenio Lazzarini	MBA	30	47:23.66	1	15
2	(Austria) Harald Bartol	Morbidelli	30	+2.23	3	12
3	(Italy) Pierpaolo Bianchi	Minarelli	30	+28.74	2	10
4	(France) Thierry Espié	Motobécane	30	+34.18	4	8
5	(Italy) Pierluigi Conforti	Morbidelli	30	+34.70	9	6
6	(Sweden) Per-Edward Carlson	Morbidelli	30	+1:01.55	7	5
7	(Switzerland) Hans Müller	Morbidelli	30	+1:03.98	6	4
8	(Finland) Matti Kinnunen	Morbidelli	30	+1:04.69	17	3
9	(France) Jean-Louis Guignabodet	Bender	30	+1:11.17	11	2
10	(Spain) Ricardo Tormo	Bultaco	30	+1:14.37		1
11	(France) Patrick Plisson	Morbidelli	30	+1:35.90	15	
12	(France) Thierry Noblesse	Morbidelli	30	+1:36.30	16	
13	(Switzerland) Stefan Dörflinger	Morbidelli	29	+1 lap	10	
14	(Italy) Felice Agostini	Morbidelli	29	+1 lap		
15	(Austria) Johann Parzer	Morbidelli	29	+1 lap		
16	(Austria) Ernst Fagerer	Morbidelli	29	+1 lap	18	
17	(Austria) August Auinger	Morbidelli	29	+1 lap		
18	(Venezuela) Ivan Palazzese	Morbidelli				
19	(Switzerland) Karl Fuchs	Morbidelli				
20	(West Germany) Walter Koschine	Bender				
	(Italy) Maurizio Massimiani	Morbidelli			5	
	(United Kingdom) Clive Horton	Morbidelli			8	
	(Spain) Ángel Nieto	Bultaco			12	
	(West Germany) Gert Bender	Bender			13	
	(Netherlands) Cees van Dongen	Morbidelli			14	
	(Austria) Hans Hummel	Morbidelli			19	
	(Switzerland) Rolf Blatter	Morbidelli			20	
36 starters in total, 24 finishers

=== Sidecar classification ===
Pos	Rider	Passenger	Manufacturer	Laps	Time	Grid	Points
1	(Switzerland) Rolf Biland	(United Kingdom) Kenny Williams	TTM-Yamaha	30	46:19.30	1	15
2	(United Kingdom) Mac Hobson	(United Kingdom) Kenny Birch	Seymaz-Yamaha	30	+17.72	11	12
3	(France) Alain Michel	(United Kingdom) Stu Collins	Seymaz-Yamaha	30	+17.86	3	10
4	(United Kingdom) George O'Dell	(United Kingdom) Cliff Holland	Seymaz-Yamaha	30	+22.19	5	8
5	(Switzerland) Bruno Holzer	(Switzerland) Karl Meierhans	LCR-Yamaha	30	+1:21.42	9	6
6	(Sweden) Göte Brodin	(Sweden) Per-Erik Wickström	Yamaha	30	+1:26.83	7	5
7	(Austria) Wolfgang Stropek	(Austria) Karl Altricher	Schmid-Yamaha	29	+1 lap		4
8	(West Germany) Hermann Huber	(West Germany) Bernd Schappacher	König	29	+1 lap	12	3
9	(Austria) Klaus Sprengel	(Austria) Manfred Kürnsteiner	Suzuki	29	+1 lap		2
10	(West Germany) Otto Haller	(West Germany) Rainer Gundel	MKM-Yamaha	28	+2 laps		1
11	(Switzerland) Ernst Trachsel	(Switzerland) Andreas Stager	TTM-Suzuki	27	+3 laps	15	
12	(United Kingdom) Jock Taylor	(United Kingdom) Lewis Ward	Windle-Yamaha	27	+3 laps		
13	(Switzerland) Jean-François Monnin	(Switzerland) Philippe Miserez	Seymaz-Yamaha	25	+5 laps	13	
	(West Germany) Werner Schwärzel	(West Germany) Andreas Huber	Fath			2	
	(Switzerland) Hermann Schmid	(United Kingdom) Kenny Arthur	Schmid-Yamaha			4	
	(West Germany) Rolf Steinhausen	(West Germany) Wolfgang Kalauch	Seymaz-Yamaha			6	
	(West Germany) Siegfried Schauzu	(West Germany) Lorenzo Puzo	Busch-Yamaha			8	
	(United Kingdom) Dick Greasley	(United Kingdom) Gordon Russell	Busch-Yamaha			10	
	(Netherlands) Egbert Streuer	(Netherlands) Johan van der Kap	Schmid-Yamaha			14	
21 starters in total

Previous race: 1978 Spanish Grand Prix	FIM Grand Prix World Championship; 1978 season	Next race: 1978 French Grand Prix
Previous race: 1977 Austrian Grand Prix	Austrian Grand Prix	Next race: 1979 Austrian Grand Prix
