= 1978 Nations motorcycle Grand Prix =

(Italy) 1978 Nations Grand Prix
Race details
- Race 5 of 13 races in the 1978 Grand Prix motorcycle racing season
- Date: 14 May 1978
- Official name: Gran Premio delle Nazioni
- Location: Autodromo Internazionale del Mugello
- Course: Permanent racing facility; 5.245 km (3.259 mi)

500cc
Pole position
- Rider: (United States) Kenny Roberts
- Time: 2:05.600
Fastest lap
- Rider: (United States) Kenny Roberts
- Time: 2:04.800
Podium
- First: (United States) Kenny Roberts
- Second: (United States) Pat Hennen
- Third: (Italy) Marco Lucchinelli

350cc
Pole position
- Rider: (Italy) Franco Uncini
- Time: 2:10.590
Fastest lap
- Rider: (Australia) Gregg Hansford
- Time: 2:07.600
Podium
- First: (South Africa) Kork Ballington
- Second: (Australia) Gregg Hansford
- Third: (Japan) Takazumi Katayama

250cc
Pole position
- Rider: (United States) Kenny Roberts
- Time: 2:11.360
Fastest lap
- Rider: (South Africa) Kork Ballington
- Time: 2:09.300
Podium
- First: (South Africa) Kork Ballington
- Second: (Australia) Gregg Hansford
- Third: (Italy) Franco Uncini

125cc
Pole position
- Rider: (Italy) Eugenio Lazzarini
- Time: 2:16.850
Fastest lap
- Rider: (France) Thierry Espié
- Time: 2:15.100
Podium
- First: (Italy) Eugenio Lazzarini
- Second: (Italy) Maurizio Massimiani
- Third: (Austria) Harald Bartol

50cc
Pole position
- Rider: (Spain) Ricardo Tormo
- Time: 2:30.330
Fastest lap
- Rider: (Switzerland) Stefan Dörflinger
- Time: 2:28.000
Podium
- First: (Spain) Ricardo Tormo
- Second: (France) Patrick Plisson
- Third: (Belgium) Julien van Zeebroeck

Sidecar (B2A)
Pole position
- Rider: (France) Alain Michel
- Passenger: (United Kingdom) Stu Collins
- Time: 2:13.490
Fastest lap
- Rider: (Switzerland) Rolf Biland
- Passenger: (United Kingdom) Kenny Williams
- Time: 2:14.700
Podium
- First rider: (Switzerland) Rolf Biland
- First passenger: (United Kingdom) Kenny Williams
- Second rider: (West Germany) Werner Schwärzel
- Second passenger: (West Germany) Andreas Huber
- Third rider: (Switzerland) Jean-François Monnin
- Third passenger: (Switzerland) Philippe Miserez

The 1978 Nations motorcycle Grand Prix was the fifth round of the 1978 Grand Prix motorcycle racing season. It took place on the weekend of 12–14 May 1978 at the Autodromo Internazionale del Mugello.

== Classification ==
=== 500 cc ===
Pos.	Rider	Team	Manufacturer	Time/Retired	Points
1	(United States) Kenny Roberts	Yamaha Motor Company	Yamaha	59'17.000	15
2	(United States) Pat Hennen		Suzuki	+6.200	12
3	(Italy) Marco Lucchinelli	Cagiva Corse	Suzuki	+35.500	10
4	(United States) Steve Baker	Team Gallina Nava Olio Fiat	Suzuki	+40.400	8
5	(United Kingdom) Barry Sheene	Texaco Heron Team Suzuki	Suzuki	+51.400	6
6	(Netherlands) Wil Hartog	Riemersma Racing	Suzuki	+1'07.500	5
7	(Finland) Tepi Länsivuori		Suzuki	+1'16.300	4
8	(Switzerland) Philippe Coulon	Marlboro Nava Total	Suzuki	+2'04.100	3
9	(Netherlands) Boet van Dulmen		Suzuki	+2'04.700	2
10	(Italy) Gianni Rolando	Team Librenti	Suzuki	+1 lap	1
11	(Italy) Nico Cereghini		Suzuki	+1 lap	
12	(Italy) Graziano Rossi	Team Gallina Nava Olio Fiat	Suzuki	+1 lap	
13	(West Germany) Franz Rau	Kazenmaier Autovermietung	Suzuki	+1 lap	
14	(United Kingdom) Alex George		Suzuki	+1 lap	
15	(Italy) Roberto Coli		Suzuki	+1 lap	
Ret	(Italy) Carlo Perugini		Suzuki	Accident	
Ret	(Spain) Carlos Delgado de San Antonio		Suzuki	Accident	
Ret	(Italy) Carlo Paganini		Suzuki	Retired	
Ret	(Switzerland) Bruno Kneubühler	RSS Racing Team	Suzuki	Retired	
Ret	(Italy) Lorenzo Ghiselli		Suzuki	Retired	
Ret	(Italy) Virginio Ferrari	Team Gallina Nava Olio Fiat	Suzuki	Retired	
Ret	(Venezuela) Johnny Cecotto	Yamaha Motor Company	Yamaha	Accident	
Ret	(France) Michel Rougerie		Suzuki	Retired	
Ret	(Italy) Pieraldo Cipriani		Paton	Clutch	
Ret	(United Kingdom) Steve Parrish		Suzuki	Retired	
Ret	(France) Christian Estrosi		Suzuki	Retired	
Ret	(France) Gregorio Mariani		Suzuki	Retired	
Ret	(Australia) Jack Findlay		Suzuki	Retired	
Ret	(France) Christian Estrosi		Suzuki	Retired	
Ret	(Japan) Takazumi Katayama	Sarome & Motul Team	Yamaha	Retired	
Ret	(Denmark) Børge Nielsen		Suzuki	Retired	
DNS	(Switzerland) Sergio Pellandini		Suzuki	Did not start	

=== 350cc ===
Pos	Rider	Manufacturer	Laps	Time	Grid	Points
1	(South Africa) Kork Ballington	Kawasaki	25	54:08.0	7	15
2	(Australia) Gregg Hansford	Kawasaki	25	+0.4	11	12
3	(Japan) Takazumi Katayama	Yamaha	25	+15.9	2	10
4	(France) Michel Rougerie	Yamaha	25	+16.2	5	8
5	(Italy) Franco Uncini	Yamaha	25	+41.4	1	6
6	(Italy) Marco Lucchinelli	Yamaha	25	+42.4	3	5
7	(France) Patrick Fernandez	Yamaha	25	+1:01.6	10	4
8	(France) Olivier Chevallier	Yamaha	25	+1:04.9	8	3
9	(Australia) Vic Soussan	Yamaha	25	+1:24.5	12	2
10	(Italy) Mario Lega	Morbidelli	25	+1:35.9	6	1
11	(United Kingdom) Tom Herron	Yamaha	25	+1:36.0	4	
12	(Finland) Pentti Korhonen	Yamaha	25	+1:58.0		
13	(Australia) John Dodds	Yamaha	25	+1:59.2		
14	(Italy) Franco Bonera	Yamaha	24	+1 lap		
15	(France) Hervé Moineau	Yamaha	24	+1 lap		
	(South Africa) Jon Ekerold	Yamaha			9	
30 starters in total, 19 finishers

=== 250cc ===
Pos	Rider	Manufacturer	Laps	Time	Grid	Points
1	(South Africa) Kork Ballington	Kawasaki	23	50:23.4	4	15
2	(Australia) Gregg Hansford	Kawasaki	23	+0.0	2	12
3	(Italy) Franco Uncini	Yamaha	23	+51.0	3	10
4	(United Kingdom) Tom Herron	Yamaha	23	+1:11.0	12	8
5	(France) Patrick Fernandez	Yamaha	23	+1:14.9	11	6
6	(Italy) Mario Lega	Morbidelli	23	+1:15.0	5	5
7	(France) Olivier Chevallier	Yamaha	23	+1:21.0		4
8	(France) Raymond Roche	Yamaha	23	+1:21.7		3
9	(France) Jean-François Baldé	Kawasaki	23	+1:57.8		2
10	(Japan) Sadao Asami	Yamaha	23	+1:57.8	7	1
11	(West Germany) Anton Mang	Kawasaki	23	+2:12.2	8	
12	(Italy) Sauro Pazzaglia	Yamaha	23	+2:13.6		
13	(Australia) John Dodds	Yamaha	22	+1 lap		
14	(Italy) Franco Solaroli	Yamaha	22	+1 lap		
15	(Australia) Vic Soussan	Yamaha	22	+1 lap	6	
	(United States) Kenny Roberts	Yamaha			1	
	(Finland) Pentti Korhonen	Yamaha			9	
	(South Africa) Jon Ekerold	Yamaha			10	
30 starters in total, 19 finishers

=== 125cc ===
Pos	Rider	Manufacturer	Laps	Time	Grid	Points
1	(Italy) Eugenio Lazzarini	MBA	20	46:25.9	1	15
2	(Italy) Maurizio Massimiani	Morbidelli	20	+26.2	8	12
3	(Austria) Harald Bartol	Morbidelli	20	+29.1	11	10
4	(France) Thierry Espié	Motobécane	20	+29.3	2	8
5	(Sweden) Per-Edward Carlson	Morbidelli	20	+49.3		6
6	(Switzerland) Hans Müller	Morbidelli	20	+54.7	9	5
7	(Spain) Ángel Nieto	Bultaco	20	+1:18.6		4
8	(France) Jean-Louis Guignabodet	Morbidelli	20	+1:27.5	12	3
9	(Switzerland) Stefan Dörflinger	Morbidelli	20	+1:39.3	10	2
10	(Italy) Enrico Cereda	Morbidelli	20	+1:48.9		1
11	(Italy) Bruno Vasetti	Morbidelli	20	+2:05.9		
12	(Italy) Italo Zerbini	Morbidelli	20	+3:46.9		
13	(Italy) Ermanno Giuliano	Morbidelli	19	+1 lap		
14	(Italy) Riccardo Russo	Morbidelli	19	+1 lap		
15	(Venezuela) Ivan Palazzese	Morbidelli	19	+1 lap		
	(Italy) Pierluigi Conforti	Morbidelli			3	
	(Italy) Pierpaolo Bianchi	Minarelli			4	
	(Italy) Felice Agostini	Morbidelli			5	
	(Finland) Matti Kinnunen	Morbidelli			6	
	(France) Thierry Noblesse	Morbidelli			7	
30 starters in total, 21 finishers

=== 50cc ===
Pos	Rider	Manufacturer	Laps	Time	Grid	Points
1	(Spain) Ricardo Tormo	Bultaco	12	30:39.4	1	15
2	(France) Patrick Plisson	ABF	12	+2.1	4	12
3	(Belgium) Julien van Zeebroeck	Kreidler	12	+19.4	5	10
4	(Switzerland) Rolf Blatter	Kreidler	12	+19.7		8
5	(Switzerland) Stefan Dörflinger	Kreidler	12	+20.0	3	6
6	(Italy) Aldo Pero	Kreidler	12	+20.2	8	5
7	(West Germany) Wolfgang Müller	Kreidler	12	+37.3	7	4
8	(Italy) Alberto Jeva	Morbidelli	12	+51.9	12	3
9	(Italy) Salvatore Monreale	Morbidelli	12	+54.7	11	2
10	(Belgium) Pierre Dumont	Kreidler	12	+1:11.8		1
11	(France) Daniel Corvi	Kreidler	12	+1:12.4		
12	(Italy) Claudio Lusuardi	Bultaco	12	+1:16.5		
13	(Italy) Enrico Cereda	DRS	12	+1:39.0		
14	(West Germany) Hagen Klein	Kreidler	12	+1:55.1		
15	(Italy) Claudio Granata	Morbidelli	12	+1:55.6	10	
	(Italy) Eugenio Lazzarini	Kreidler			2	
	(West Germany) Ingo Emmerich	Kreidler			6	
	(Italy) Sergio Zattoni	Derbi			9	
30 starters in total, 21 finishers

=== Sidecar classification ===
Pos	Rider	Passenger	Manufacturer	Laps	Time	Grid	Points
1	(Switzerland) Rolf Biland	(United Kingdom) Kenny Williams	Beo-Yamaha	20	45:40.2	2	15
2	(West Germany) Werner Schwärzel	(West Germany) Andreas Huber	Fath	20	+11.5	5	12
3	(Switzerland) Jean-François Monnin	(Switzerland) Philippe Miserez	Seymaz-Yamaha	20	+39.6	3	10
4	(United Kingdom) Dick Greasley	(United Kingdom) Gordon Russell	Busch-Yamaha	20	+46.6	9	8
5	(Switzerland) Bruno Holzer	(Switzerland) Karl Meierhans	LCR-Yamaha	20	+1:20.1	8	6
6	(France) Yvan Troillet	(France) Pierre Muller	GEP-Yamaha	20	+1:26.6	7	5
7	(Switzerland) Hermann Schmid	(United Kingdom) Kenny Arthur	Schmid-Yamaha	20	+1:33.2		4
8	(United Kingdom) Jock Taylor	(United Kingdom) Lewis Ward	Windle-Yamaha	20	+1:37.2		3
9	(Switzerland) Ernst Trachsel	(Switzerland) Andreas Stager	TTM-Suzuki	19	+1 lap		2
10	(United Kingdom) George O'Dell	(United Kingdom) Cliff Holland	Seymaz-Yamaha	19	+1 lap	6	1
11	(West Germany) Siegfried Schauzu	(West Germany) Lorenzo Puzo	Busch-Yamaha	19	+1 laps		
12	(Netherlands) Egbert Streuer	(Netherlands) Johann van der Kaap	Schmid-Yamaha	19	+1 laps		
	(France) Alain Michel	(United Kingdom) Stu Collins	Seymaz-Yamaha			1	
	(West Germany) Rolf Steinhausen	(West Germany) Wolfgang Kalauch	Seymaz-Yamaha			4	
	(United Kingdom) Mac Hobson	(United Kingdom) Ken Birch	Yamaha			10	

Previous race: 1978 French Grand Prix	FIM Grand Prix World Championship; 1978 season	Next race: 1978 Dutch TT
Previous race: 1977 Nations Grand Prix	Nations Grand Prix	Next race: 1979 Nations Grand Prix
