= 1978 Swedish motorcycle Grand Prix =

(Sweden) 1978 Swedish Grand Prix
Race details
- Race 8 of 13 races in the 1978 Grand Prix motorcycle racing season
- Date: 23 July 1978
- Official name: Sveriges Grand Prix
- Location: Karlskoga Motorstadion
- Course: Permanent racing facility; 3.150 km (1.957 mi)

500cc
Pole position
- Rider: (Venezuela) Johnny Cecotto
- Time: 1:22.580
Fastest lap
- Rider: (Venezuela) Johnny Cecotto
- Time: 1:22.066
Podium
- First: (United Kingdom) Barry Sheene
- Second: (Netherlands) Wil Hartog
- Third: (Japan) Takazumi Katayama

350cc
Pole position
- Rider: (Australia) Gregg Hansford
- Time: 1:22.292
Fastest lap
- Rider: (Australia) Gregg Hansford
- Time: 1:22.216
Podium
- First: (Australia) Gregg Hansford
- Second: (South Africa) Kork Ballington
- Third: (Japan) Takazumi Katayama

250cc
Pole position
- Rider: (South Africa) Kork Ballington
- Time: 1:24.400
Fastest lap
- Rider: (Australia) Gregg Hansford
- Time: 1:23.504
Podium
- First: (Australia) Gregg Hansford
- Second: (South Africa) Kork Ballington
- Third: (France) Patrick Fernandez

125cc
Pole position
- Rider: (Italy) Pierpaolo Bianchi
- Time: 1:29.539
Fastest lap
- Rider: (Spain) Ángel Nieto
- Time: 1:28.767
Podium
- First: (Italy) Pierpaolo Bianchi
- Second: (Spain) Ángel Nieto
- Third: (France) Thierry Espié

The 1978 Swedish motorcycle Grand Prix was the eighth round of the 1978 Grand Prix motorcycle racing season. It took place on 23 July 1978 at Karlskoga Motorstadion. This was the 300th race to contribute to the Grand Prix motorcycle racing championship.

== 500cc classification ==
Pos.	Rider	Team	Manufacturer	Time/Retired	Points
1	(United Kingdom) Barry Sheene	Texaco Heron Team Suzuki	Suzuki	55'49.130	15
2	(Netherlands) Wil Hartog	Riemersma Racing	Suzuki	+0.052	12
3	(Japan) Takazumi Katayama	Sarome & Motul Team	Yamaha	+8.489	10
4	(United States) Steve Baker	Team Gallina Nava Olio Fiat	Suzuki	+15.604	8
5	(Italy) Virginio Ferrari	Team Gallina Nava Olio Fiat	Suzuki	+23.138	6
6	(Venezuela) Johnny Cecotto	Yamaha Motor Company	Yamaha	+28.490	5
7	(United States) Kenny Roberts	Yamaha Motor Company	Yamaha	+48.728	4
8	(Finland) Tepi Länsivuori		Suzuki	+1'02.411	3
9	(Switzerland) Philippe Coulon	Marlboro Nava Total	Suzuki	+1'03.249	2
10	(United Kingdom) Alex George		Suzuki	+1 lap	1
11	(Netherlands) Boet van Dulmen		Suzuki	+1 lap	
12	(Finland) Markku Matikäinen		Suzuki	+1 lap	
13	(Netherlands) Jack Middelburg		Suzuki	+1 lap	
14	(Switzerland) Bruno Kneubühler	RSS Racing Team	Suzuki	+1 lap	
15	(United Kingdom) Steve Parrish		Suzuki	+1 lap	
16	(Austria) Max Wiener		Suzuki	+1 lap	
17	(New Zealand) John Woodley	Sid Griffiths Racing	Suzuki	+2 laps	
18	(Norway) Odd Aren Lande		Suzuki	+2 laps	
19	(Sweden) Peter Sjoström		Suzuki	+2 laps	
20	(West Germany) Franz Rau	Kazenmaier Autovermietung	Suzuki	+2 laps	
21	(Netherlands) Dick Alblas		Suzuki	+2 laps	
Ret	(France) Michel Rougerie		Suzuki	Retired	
Ret	(Spain) Carlos Delgado de San Antonio		Suzuki	Accident	
Ret	(France) Jean-Claude Hogrel	Buton	Buton	Accident	
Ret	(West Germany) Karl Jensen		Yamaha	Retired	
Ret	(South Africa) Leslie van Breda		Suzuki	Accident	
Ret	(New Zealand) Dennis Ireland		Suzuki	Accident	
Ret	(West Germany) Jürgen Steiner	Caramba Racing Team Bohme	Suzuki	Retired	
Ret	(Italy) Marco Lucchinelli	Cagiva Corse	Suzuki	Retired	
DNS	(Norway) Bengt Slydal		Suzuki	Did not start	
DNQ	(Sweden) Bo Granath		Suzuki	Did not qualify	

== 350 cc classification ==
Pos	Rider	Manufacturer	Laps	Time	Grid	Points
1	(Australia) Gregg Hansford	Kawasaki	36	50:17.809	1	15
2	(South Africa) Kork Ballington	Kawasaki	36	+7.349	2	12
3	(Japan) Takazumi Katayama	Yamaha	36	+21.665	3	10
4	(South Africa) Jon Ekerold	Yamaha	36	+42.523	8	8
5	(United Kingdom) Tom Herron	Yamaha	36	+51.558	11	6
6	(France) Patrick Fernandez	Yamaha	36	+58.127	6	5
7	(Finland) Pentti Korhonen	Yamaha	36	+1:07.238	4	4
8	(Australia) Vic Soussan	Yamaha	36	+1:08.941	7	3
9	(United Kingdom) Mick Grant	Kawasaki	36	+1:15.827	5	2
10	(France) Michel Rougerie	Yamaha	35	+1 lap	19	1
11	(France) Patrick Pons	Yamaha	35	+1 lap	13	
12	(France) Olivier Chevallier	Yamaha	35	+1 lap	10	
13	(West Germany) Anton Mang	Kawasaki	35	+1 lap		
14	(Finland) Eero Hyvärinen	Yamaha	35	+1 lap		
15	(Switzerland) Michel Frutschi	Yamaha	35	+1 lap	20	
16	(Finland) Seppo Rossi	Yamaha	35	+1 lap		
17	(Finland) Reino Eskelinen	Yamaha	35	+1 lap		
18	(Sweden) Lennart Båckström	Yamaha	35	+1 lap		
19	(Sweden) B. Elgh	Yamaha	34	+2 laps		
20	(Sweden) Bo Granath	Yamaha	34	+2 laps		
	(Italy) Franco Uncini	Yamaha			9	
	(United Kingdom) Clive Padgett	Yamaha			12	
	(France) Christian Sarron	Yamaha			14	
	(Netherlands) Hans Hansebraten	Yamaha			15	
	(United Kingdom) Chas Mortimer	Yamaha			16	
	(Sweden) Leif Gustafsson	Yamaha			17	
	(Netherlands) Jack Middelburg	Yamaha			18	
30 starters in total

== 250 cc classification ==
Pos	Rider	Manufacturer	Laps	Time	Grid	Points
1	(Australia) Gregg Hansford	Kawasaki	36	50:43.958	2	15
2	(South Africa) Kork Ballington	Kawasaki	36	+5.178	1	12
3	(France) Patrick Fernandez	Yamaha	36	+1:12.584	6	10
4	(South Africa) Jon Ekerold	Yamaha	36	+1:15.458	11	8
5	(United Kingdom) Tom Herron	Yamaha	36	+1:21.730	5	6
6	(United Kingdom) Clive Padgett	Yamaha	35	+1 lap	13	5
7	(Italy) Mario Lega	Morbidelli	35	+1 lap	7	4
8	(United Kingdom) Chas Mortimer	Yamaha	35	+1 lap	12	3
9	(West Germany) Anton Mang	Kawasaki	35	+1 lap	15	2
10	(France) Hervé Moineau	Yamaha	35	+1 lap	16	1
11	(Finland) Eero Hyvärinen	Yamaha	35	+1 lap	17	
12	(Italy) Paolo Pileri	Morbidelli	35	+1 lap	20	
13	(Finland) Seppo Rossi	Yamaha	34	+2 laps		
14	(Finland) Reino Eskelinen	Yamaha	34	+2 laps		
15	(Sweden) P. Jansson	Yamaha	34	+2 laps		
16	(Sweden) B. Elgh	Yamaha	34	+2 laps		
17	(Sweden) Lennart Båckström	Yamaha	34	+2 laps		
	(Italy) Franco Uncini	Yamaha			3	
	(Australia) Vic Soussan	Yamaha			4	
	(Finland) Pentti Korhonen	Yamaha			8	
	(United Kingdom) Mick Grant	Kawasaki			9	
	(Sweden) Leif Gustafsson	Yamaha			10	
	(France) Olivier Chevallier	Yamaha			14	
	(Belgium) Richard Hubin	Yamaha			18	
	(Switzerland) Hans Müller	Yamaha			19	
30 starters in total

== 125 cc classification ==
Pos	Rider	Manufacturer	Laps	Time	Grid	Points
1	(Italy) Pierpaolo Bianchi	Minarelli	32	48:07.322	1	15
2	(Spain) Ángel Nieto	Minarelli	32	+0.104	4	12
3	(France) Thierry Espié	Motobécane	32	+7.441	2	10
4	(Sweden) Per-Edward Carlson	Morbidelli	32	+51.523	3	8
5	(Austria) August Auinger	Morbidelli	32	+56.571	8	6
6	(France) Jean-Louis Guignabodet	Morbidelli	32	+1:00.370	10	5
7	(United Kingdom) Clive Horton	Morbidelli	32	+1:02.718	11	4
8	(Finland) Matti Kinnunen	Morbidelli	32	+1:04.820	14	3
9	(Switzerland) Hans Müller	Morbidelli	32	+1:10.382	6	2
10	(West Germany) Walter Koschine	Bender	32	+1:18.923	17	1
11	(France) Patrick Plisson	Morbidelli	31	+1 lap	7	
12	(Switzerland) Stefan Dörflinger	Morbidelli	31	+1 lap	13	
13	(West Germany) Bernd Schneider	Bender	31	+1 lap	16	
14	(Sweden) A. Alexandersson	Morbidelli	31	+1 lap		
15	(Netherlands) Cees van der Ven	Morbidelli	30	+2 laps		
16	(Sweden) Jan Båckström	Maico	30	+2 laps		
17	(Sweden) Lennart Lundgren	Yamaha	30	+2 laps		
18	(Sweden) Johnny Wickström	Morbidelli	30	+2 laps		
19	(Sweden) Jonny Svensson	Bastard	30	+2 laps		
	(Italy) Eugenio Lazzarini	MBA			5	
	(Austria) Harald Bartol	Morbidelli			9	
	(Italy) Maurizio Massimiani	Morbidelli			12	
	(France) François Granon	Morbidelli			15	
	(Switzerland) Karl Fuchs	Morbidelli			18	
	(Sweden) Roland Olsson	Starol			19	
	(Sweden) Bengt-Göran Johansson	Morbidelli			20	
30 starters in total

Previous race: 1978 Belgian Grand Prix	FIM Grand Prix World Championship; 1978 season	Next race: 1978 Finnish Grand Prix
Previous race: 1977 Swedish Grand Prix	Swedish Grand Prix	Next race: 1979 Swedish Grand Prix
