= 1978 Czechoslovak motorcycle Grand Prix =

(Czechoslovakia) 1978 Czechoslovak Grand Prix
Race details
- Race 12 of 13 races in the 1978 Grand Prix motorcycle racing season
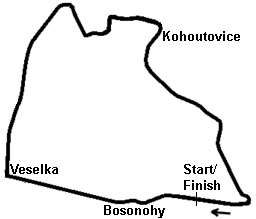
- Date: 27 August 1978
- Official name: Grand Prix ČSSR
- Location: Brno
- Course: Permanent racing facility; 10.920 km (6.785 mi)

350cc
Pole position
Rider	(South Africa) Kork Ballington	Kawasaki
Time	3:55.79	
Fastest lap
Rider	(South Africa) Kork Ballington	Kawasaki
Time	3:54.33	
Podium
First	(South Africa) Kork Ballington	Kawasaki
Second	(Australia) Gregg Hansford	Kawasaki
Third	(France) Michel Rougerie	Yamaha

250cc
Pole position
Rider	(South Africa) Kork Ballington	Kawasaki
Time	4:04.40	
Fastest lap
Rider	(South Africa) Kork Ballington	Kawasaki
Time	4:03.17	
Podium
First	(South Africa) Kork Ballington	Kawasaki
Second	(Australia) Gregg Hansford	Kawasaki
Third	(Italy) Mario Lega	Morbidelli

50cc
Pole position
Rider	(Spain) Ricardo Tormo	Bultaco
Time	4:50.65	
Fastest lap
Rider	(Spain) Ricardo Tormo	Bultaco
Time	4:48.65	
Podium
First	(Spain) Ricardo Tormo	Bultaco
Second	(Italy) Claudio Lusuardi	Bultaco
Third	(Netherlands) Henk van Kessel	Sparton

Sidecar (B2A)
Pole position
Rider	(West Germany) Werner Schwärzel	Fath
Passenger	(West Germany) Andreas Huber	
Time	4:06.68	
Fastest lap
Rider	(France) Alain Michel	Seymaz-Yamaha
Passenger	(United Kingdom) Stu Collins	
Time	4:10.24	
Podium
First rider	(France) Alain Michel	Seymaz-Yamaha
First passenger	(United Kingdom) Stu Collins	
Second rider	(Switzerland) Rolf Biland	TTM-Yamaha
Second passenger	(United Kingdom) Kenny Williams	
Third rider	(United Kingdom) Dick Greasley	Busch-Yamaha
Third passenger	(United Kingdom) Gordon Russell	

The 1978 Czechoslovak motorcycle Grand Prix was the twelfth round of the 1978 Grand Prix motorcycle racing season. It took place on 27 August 1978 at the Brno circuit.

== 350 cc classification ==
Pos	Rider	Manufacturer	Laps	Time	Grid	Points
1	(South Africa) Kork Ballington	Kawasaki	13	51:22.59	1	15
2	(Australia) Gregg Hansford	Kawasaki	13	+2.32	4	12
3	(France) Michel Rougerie	Yamaha	13	+18.43	2	10
4	(South Africa) Jon Ekerold	Yamaha	13	+28.96	6	8
5	(Italy) Paolo Pileri	Morbidelli	13	+32.18	3	6
6	(Japan) Takazumi Katayama	Yamaha	13	+33.24	17	5
7	(West Germany) Anton Mang	Kawasaki	13	+35.70	15	4
8	(United Kingdom) Tom Herron	Yamaha	13	+40.43	9	3
9	(Finland) Pentti Korhonen	Yamaha	13	+50.13	5	2
10	(France) Raymond Roche	Yamaha	13	+50.59	7	1
11	(France) Guy Bertin	Yamaha	13	+1:26.54	16	
12	(France) Olivier Chevallier	Yamaha	13	+1:37.59	8	
13	(Switzerland) Bruno Kneubühler	Yamaha	13	+1:55.60	11	
14	(Italy) Adelio Faccioli	Yamaha	13	+2:08.82	18	
15	(West Germany) Harald Merkl	Yamaha	13	+2:24.23		
16	(Finland) Seppo Rossi	Yamaha	13	+3:12.77		
17	(France) Jean-Claude Hogrel	Yamaha	13	+3:15.62		
18	(Austria) Edi Stöllinger	Yamaha	13	+3:16.10		
19	(Venezuela) Carlos Lavado	Yamaha	13	+6:49.57		
20	(Japan) Y. Matsumoto	Yamaha	12	+1 lap		
21	(Austria) Michael Schmid	Yamaha	12	+1 lap		
22	(Sweden) K. Johansson	Yamaha	12	+1 lap		
	(Italy) Franco Uncini	Yamaha			10	
	(Belgium) Richard Hubin	Yamaha			12	
	(France) Patrick Fernandez	Yamaha			13	
	(Australia) Vic Soussan	Yamaha			14	
	(Italy) Sauro Pazzaglia	Yamaha			19	
	(Switzerland) Roland Freymond	Yamaha			20	
40 starters in total

== 250 cc classification ==
Pos	Rider	Manufacturer	Laps	Time	Grid	Points
1	(South Africa) Kork Ballington	Kawasaki	11	45:18.37	1	15
2	(Australia) Gregg Hansford	Kawasaki	11	+16.24	3	12
3	(Italy) Mario Lega	Morbidelli	11	+22.41	10	10
4	(France) Patrick Fernandez	Yamaha	11	+31.09	7	8
5	(South Africa) Jon Ekerold	Yamaha	11	+31.37	5	6
6	(France) Raymond Roche	Yamaha	11	+1:10.83	16	5
7	(Australia) Vic Soussan	Yamaha	11	+1:16.36	15	4
8	(Italy) Walter Villa	Harley-Davidson	11	+1:19.66	18	3
9	(Italy) Franco Uncini	Yamaha	11	+1:27.88	9	2
10	(West Germany) Anton Mang	Kawasaki	11	+1:32.44	14	1
11	(France) Guy Bertin	Yamaha	11	+1:33.15	17	
12	(Austria) Edi Stöllinger	Kawasaki	11	+1:34.23	20	
13	(France) Marc Fontan	Yamaha	11	+1:34.77	19	
14	(Switzerland) Jacques Cornu	Yamaha	11	+2:06.73		
15	(France) Olivier Chevallier	Yamaha	11	+2:07.32	6	
16	(Austria) Grunwald Harfmann	Yamaha	11	+2:12.01	11	
17	(United Kingdom) Dave Hickman	Jawa	11	+2:12.57		
18	(West Germany) Bernd Tügethal	Yamaha	11	+2:21.48		
19	(Finland) Seppo Rossi	Yamaha	11	+2:22.01		
20	(West Germany) Harald Merkl	Yamaha	11	+2:30.92		
21	(Italy) Giovanni Pellettier	Yamaha	11	+2:43.95		
22	(France) T. Laurens	Yamaha	11	+2:55.32		
23	(West Germany) Karl-Thomas Grässel	Yamaha	11	+2:55.79		
24	(Finland) Eero Hyvärinen	Yamaha	11	+3:16.23		
	(Italy) Paolo Pileri	Morbidelli			2	
	(Sweden) Leif Gustafsson	Yamaha			4	
	(Belgium) Richard Hubin	Yamaha			8	
	(United Kingdom) Tom Herron	Yamaha			12	
	(France) Jean-François Baldé	Kawasaki			13	
40 starters in total

== 50 cc classification ==
Pos	Rider	Manufacturer	Laps	Time	Grid	Points
1	(Spain) Ricardo Tormo	Bultaco	8	38:47.11	1	15
2	(Italy) Claudio Lusuardi	Bultaco	8	+2:24.29	6	12
3	(Netherlands) Henk van Kessel	Sparton	8	+2:46.19	13	10
4	(Italy) Enrico Cereda	DRS	8	+2:46.77	7	8
5	(West Germany) Reiner Scheidhauer	Kreidler	8	+2:47.28	8	6
6	(Italy) Aldo Pero	Kreidler	8	+3:18.51	12	5
7	(Italy) Luigi Rinaudo	Tomos	8	+3:42.61	18	4
8	(France) Patrick Plisson	ABF	8	+3:50.05	17	3
9	(Czechoslovakia) Zbyned Havrda	Kreidler	8	+3:51.59		2
10	(West Germany) Wolfgang Müller	Kreidler	8	+4:23.98	9	1
11	(West Germany) Ingo Emmerich	Kreidler	8	+4:24.57	11	
12	(Netherlands) Cees van Dongen	Kreidler	8	+4:36.71		
13	(France) Daniel Corvi	Kreidler	8	+4:38.70	4	
14	(Belgium) Chris Baert	Kreidler	8	+4:51.86		
15	(France) Bruno di Carlo	Kreidler	8	+5:11.73		
16	(West Germany) Wolfgang Glawaty	Kreidler	8	+5:30.71		
17	(Austria) Otto Machinek	Kreidler	7	+1 lap		
18	(Norway) Ove Skifjeld	Kreidler	7	+1 lap		
19	(Portugal) Henrique Sande	Kreidler	7	+1 lap	5	
20	(Czechoslovakia) O. Krmicek	Kreidler	6	+2 laps		
	(Switzerland) Stefan Dörflinger	Kreidler			2	
	(Italy) Eugenio Lazzarini	Kreidler			3	
	(West Germany) Hagen Klein	Kreidler			10	
	(Belgium) Pierre Dumont	Kreidler			14	
	(Switzerland) Rolf Blatter	Kreidler			15	
	(Austria) Hans Hummel	Kreidler			16	
	(West Germany) Günter Schirnhofer	Kreidler			19	
	(Netherlands) Theo Timmer	Kreidler			20	
34 starters in total

== Sidecar classification ==
Pos	Rider	Passenger	Manufacturer	Laps	Time	Grid	Points
1	(France) Alain Michel	(United Kingdom) Stu Collins	Seymaz-Yamaha	11	46:22.09	2	15
2	(Switzerland) Rolf Biland	(United Kingdom) Kenny Williams	TTM-Yamaha	11	+21.11	3	12
3	(United Kingdom) Dick Greasley	(United Kingdom) Gordon Russell	Busch-Yamaha	11	+22.27	7	10
4	(United Kingdom) Jock Taylor	(United Kingdom) James Neil	Windle-Yamaha	11	+40.14	4	8
5	(Switzerland) Hermann Schmid	(United Kingdom) Kenny Arthur	Schmid-Yamaha	11	+1:15.03	8	6
6	(West Germany) Max Venus	(West Germany) Norbert Bittermann	CAT-Yamaha	11	+1:18.93	9	5
7	(West Germany) Siegfried Schauzu	(West Germany) Lorenzo Puzo	Busch-Yamaha	11	+2:15.02	11	4
8	(Netherlands) Cees Smit	(West Germany) Jan Smit	Seymaz-Yamaha	11	+2:21.90		3
9	(Italy) Amedeo Zini	(Italy) Andrea Fornaro	Busch-König	11	+2:25.37		2
10	(Netherlands) Egbert Streuer	(Netherlands) Johann van der Kaap	Schmid-Yamaha	11	+3:04.12		1
11	(Austria) Klaus Sprengel	(Austria) Manfred Kürnsteiner	Suzuki	11	+3:26.94		
12	(West Germany) Kurt Jelonek	(West Germany) V. Knapp	König	11	+3:47.02		
13	(Switzerland) Gerald Corbaz	(Switzerland) Roland Gabriel	Schmid-Yamaha	10	+1 lap		
14	(Finland) Kalevi Rahko	(Finland) Kari Laatikäinen	Schmid-Yamaha	10	+1 lap		
15	(West Germany) Heinz Thevissen	(West Germany) Lothar Klein	HTS-Yamaha	10	+1 lap		
16	(West Germany) Heinz Luthringhauser	(West Germany) Hermann Hahnn	BMW	10	+1 lap		
17	(West Germany) Ted Janssen	(United Kingdom) Dennis Keen	Yamaha	5	+6 laps		
	(West Germany) Werner Schwärzel	(West Germany) Andreas Huber	Fath			1	
	(West Germany) Rolf Steinhausen	(West Germany) Wolfgang Kalauch	Seymaz-Yamaha			5	
	(Switzerland) Bruno Holzer	(Switzerland) Karl Meierhans	LCR-Yamaha			6	
	(Sweden) Göte Brodin	(Sweden) B. Gäl-Iros	Yamaha			10	
	(United Kingdom) George O'Dell	(United Kingdom) Cliff Holland	Seymaz-Yamaha			12	
	(West Germany) Hermann Huber	(West Germany) Bernd Schappacher	König			13	
	(West Germany) Otto Haller	(West Germany) Rainer Gundel	MKM-Yamaha			14	
	(West Germany) Gustav Pape	(West Germany) Franz Kallenberg	König			15	
30 starters in total

Previous race: 1978 German Grand Prix	FIM Grand Prix World Championship; 1978 season	Next race: 1978 Yugoslavian Grand Prix
Previous race: 1977 Czechoslovak Grand Prix	Czechoslovak Grand Prix	Next race: 1979 Czechoslovak Grand Prix
