= 1978 Belgian motorcycle Grand Prix =

Motorcycle race

(Belgium) 1978 Belgian Grand Prix
Race details
- Race 7 of 13 races in the 1978 Grand Prix motorcycle racing season
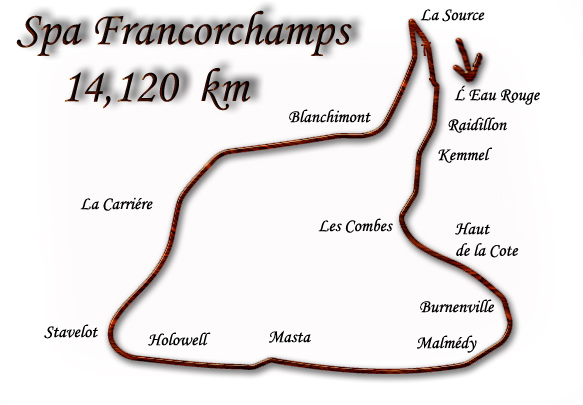
- Date: 2 July 1978
- Official name: Grand Prix Belgique / Grote Prijs België
- Location: Circuit de Spa-Francorchamps
- Course: Permanent racing facility; 14.100 km (8.761 mi)

500cc
Pole position
- Rider: (Venezuela) Johnny Cecotto
- Time: 3:48.600
Fastest lap
- Rider: (France) Michel Rougerie
- Time: 3:51.700
Podium
- First: (Netherlands) Wil Hartog
- Second: (United States) Kenny Roberts
- Third: (United Kingdom) Barry Sheene

250cc
Pole position
- Rider: (South Africa) Kork Ballington
- Time: 4:08.000
Fastest lap
- Rider: (Italy) Walter Villa
- Time: 4:22.400
Podium
- First: (Italy) Paolo Pileri
- Second: (Italy) Franco Uncini
- Third: (Italy) Walter Villa

125cc
Pole position
- Rider: (Spain) Ángel Nieto
- Time: 4:23.200
Fastest lap
- Rider: (Italy) Pierpaolo Bianchi (Spain) Ángel Nieto
- Time: 4:42.700
Podium
- First: (Italy) Pierpaolo Bianchi
- Second: (Spain) Ángel Nieto
- Third: (Italy) Maurizio Massimiani

50cc
Pole position
- Rider: (Spain) Ricardo Tormo
- Time: 5:12.500
Fastest lap
- Rider: (Spain) Ricardo Tormo
- Time: 5:16.100
Podium
- First: (Spain) Ricardo Tormo
- Second: (Italy) Eugenio Lazzarini
- Third: (Switzerland) Stefan Dörflinger

Sidecar (B2A)
Pole position
- Rider: (West Germany) Rolf Steinhausen
- Passenger: (West Germany) Wolfgang Kalauch
- Time: 4:15.400
Fastest lap
- Rider: (France) Alain Michel
- Passenger: (United Kingdom) Stu Collins
- Time: 5:03.700
Podium
- First rider: (Switzerland) Bruno Holzer
- First passenger: (Switzerland) Karl Meierhans
- Second rider: (France) Alain Michel
- Second passenger: (United Kingdom) Stu Collins
- Third rider: (Switzerland) Rolf Biland
- Third passenger: (United Kingdom) Kenny Williams

The 1978 Belgian motorcycle Grand Prix was the seventh round of the 1978 Grand Prix motorcycle racing season. It took place on 2 July 1978 at the Circuit de Spa-Francorchamps. These races, along with the Spa 24 Hours touring car race 3 weeks later were the last international major events held on the old 14 kilometer Spa-Francorchamps circuit.

== 500 cc classification ==
| Pos. | No. | Rider | Team | Manufacturer | Time/Retired | Points |
|---|---|---|---|---|---|---|
| 1 | 15 | (Netherlands) Wil Hartog | Riemersma Racing | Suzuki | 39'50.400 | 15 |
| 2 | 2 | (United States) Kenny Roberts | Yamaha Motor Company | Yamaha | +15.800 | 12 |
| 3 | 7 | (United Kingdom) Barry Sheene | Texaco Heron Team Suzuki | Suzuki | +18.600 | 10 |
| 4 | 30 | (France) Michel Rougerie | | Suzuki | +21.300 | 8 |
| 5 | 21 | (Finland) Tepi Länsivuori | | Suzuki | +1'18.900 | 6 |
| 6 | 8 | (Japan) Takazumi Katayama | Sarome & Motul Team | Yamaha | +1 lap | 5 |
| 7 | 22 | (Italy) Marco Lucchinelli | Cagiva Corse | Suzuki | +1 lap | 4 |
| 8 | 9 | (United Kingdom) Alex George | | Suzuki | +1 lap | 3 |
| 9 | 17 | (United Kingdom) Tom Herron | | Suzuki | +1 lap | 2 |
| 10 | 46 | (New Zealand) Dennis Ireland | | Suzuki | +1 lap | 1 |
| 11 | 39 | (New Zealand) John Woodley | Sid Griffiths Racing | Suzuki | +1 lap | |
| 12 | 38 | (United Kingdom) John Williams | Team Appleby Glade | Suzuki | +1 lap | |
| 13 | 41 | (Sweden) Bo Granath | | Suzuki | +1 lap | |
| 14 | 29 | (Italy) Graziano Rossi | Team Gallina Nava Olio Fiat | Suzuki | +1 lap | |
| 15 | 14 | (Australia) Jack Findlay | | Suzuki | +1 lap | |
| 16 | 48 | (Australia) Greg Johnson | | Suzuki | +1 lap | |
| 17 | 45 | (Belgium) Hervé Regout | | Yamaha | +1 lap | |
| 18 | 37 | (Austria) Max Wiener | | Suzuki | +1 lap | |
| 19 | 33 | (South Africa) Leslie van Breda | | Suzuki | +1 lap | |
| 20 | 36 | (West Germany) Gerhard Vogt | Bill Smith Racing | Suzuki | +1 lap | |
| 21 | ?? | (Belgium) Guy Cooremans | | Suzuki | +1 lap | |
| 22 | ?? | (France) Jean-Claude Hogrel | Buton | Buton | +1 lap | |
| Ret | | (Venezuela) Johnny Cecotto | Yamaha Motor Company | Yamaha | Retired | |
| Ret | | (Switzerland) Philippe Coulon | Marlboro Nava Total | Suzuki | Retired | |
| Ret | | (Netherlands) Boet van Dulmen | | Suzuki | Retired | |
| Ret | | (Italy) Virginio Ferrari | Team Gallina Nava Olio Fiat | Suzuki | Retired | |
| Ret | | (United States) Steve Baker | Team Gallina Nava Olio Fiat | Suzuki | Retired | |
| Ret | | (Switzerland) Bruno Kneubühler | RSS Racing Team | Suzuki | Retired | |
| Ret | | (United Kingdom) John Newbold | Ray Hamblin Motorcycles | Suzuki | Retired | |
| Ret | | (Denmark) Børge Nielsen | | Suzuki | Retired | |
| Ret | | (South Africa) Jon Ekerold | Suzuki Deutschland | Yamaha | Retired | |
| Ret | | (Netherlands) Dick Alblas | | Suzuki | Retired | |
| Ret | | (West Germany) Franz Heller | Caramba Racing Team Bohme | Suzuki | Retired | |
| Ret | | (West Germany) Franz Rau | Kazenmaier Autovermietung | Suzuki | Retired | |
| Ret | | (Netherlands) Cees Scheepens | | Suzuki | Retired | |
| Ret | | (United Kingdom) Steve Parrish | | Suzuki | Retired | |

== 250 cc classification ==
| Pos | No. | Rider | Manufacturer | Laps | Time | Grid | Points |
|---|---|---|---|---|---|---|---|
| 1 | 31 | (Italy) Paolo Pileri | Morbidelli | 9 | 40:35.0 | | 15 |
| 2 | 56 | (Italy) Franco Uncini | Yamaha | 9 | +23.1 | 4 | 12 |
| 3 | 37 | (Italy) Walter Villa | Harley-Davidson | 9 | +37.6 | 2 | 10 |
| 4 | 9 | (France) Patrick Fernandez | Yamaha | 9 | +37.8 | 8 | 8 |
| 5 | 1 | (South Africa) Kork Ballington | Kawasaki | 9 | +1:07.0 | 1 | 6 |
| 6 | 21 | (Italy) Mario Lega | Morbidelli | 9 | +1:07.2 | 3 | 5 |
| 7 | 22 | (West Germany) Anton Mang | Kawasaki | 9 | | | 4 |
| 8 | 36 | (Australia) Vic Soussan | Yamaha | 9 | | | 3 |
| 9 | 20 | (Finland) Pentti Korhonen | Yamaha | 9 | | 6 | 2 |
| 10 | 12 | (Sweden) Leif Gustafsson | Yamaha | 9 | | 9 | 1 |
| 11 | 7 | (South Africa) Jon Ekerold | Yamaha | 9 | | 10 | |
| 12 | 48 | (Belgium) Etienne Geeraerd | Yamaha | 9 | | | |
| 13 | 43 | (Belgium) Albert Debouny | Yamaha | 9 | | | |
| 14 | 14 | (West Germany) Josef Hage | Japol | 9 | | | |
| 15 | 29 | (Finland) Pekka Nurmi | Yamaha | 9 | | 12 | |
| 16 | 62 | (Finland) Reino Eskelinen | Yamaha | 9 | | | |
| 17 | 45 | (Belgium) René Delaby | Yamaha | 9 | | | |
| 18 | 17 | (Finland) Eero Hyvärinen | Yamaha | 9 | | | |
| 19 | 63 | (United Kingdom) Clive Padgett | Yamaha | 9 | | | |
| 20 | 3 | (Australia) Kenny Blake | Yamaha | 9 | | | |
| | | (Australia) John Dodds | Yamaha | | | 5 | |
| | | (United States) Kenny Roberts | Yamaha | | | 7 | |
| | | (Australia) Gregg Hansford | Kawasaki | | | 11 | |
38 starters in total, 24 finishers

== 125 cc classification ==
| Pos | No. | Rider | Manufacturer | Laps | Time | Grid | Points |
|---|---|---|---|---|---|---|---|
| 1 | 3 | (Italy) Pierpaolo Bianchi | Minarelli | 8 | 38:12.2 | 3 | 15 |
| 2 | 32 | (Spain) Ángel Nieto | Minarelli | 8 | +3.3 | 1 | 12 |
| 3 | 30 | (Italy) Maurizio Massimiani | Morbidelli | 8 | +11.1 | 10 | 10 |
| 4 | 1 | (Austria) August Auinger | Morbidelli | 8 | +1:29.3 | 9 | 8 |
| 5 | 37 | (France) Patrick Plisson | Morbidelli | 8 | +1:34.5 | 7 | 6 |
| 6 | 26 | (Italy) Eugenio Lazzarini | MBA | 8 | | 6 | 5 |
| 7 | 31 | (Switzerland) Hans Müller | Morbidelli | 8 | | 5 | 4 |
| 8 | 4 | (Switzerland) Rolf Blatter | Morbidelli | 8 | | | 3 |
| 9 | 45 | (Netherlands) Cees van Dongen | Morbidelli | 8 | | | 2 |
| 10 | 21 | (Finland) Matti Kinnunen | Morbidelli | 8 | | | 1 |
| 11 | 47 | (Netherlands) Bennie Wilbers | Morbidelli | 8 | | | |
| 12 | 41 | (France) Jean-Claude Selini | Morbidelli | 8 | | | |
| 13 | 24 | (West Germany) Walter Koschine | Bender | 8 | | 12 | |
| 14 | 17 | (United Kingdom) Clive Horton | Morbidelli | 8 | | | |
| 15 | 6 | (Italy) Enrico Cereda | Morbidelli | 8 | | | |
| 16 | 22 | (Sweden) Bengt Johansson | Morbidelli | 8 | | | |
| 17 | 10 | (France) Yves Dupont | Morbidelli | 8 | | | |
| 18 | 18 | (Netherlands) Jan Huberts | Morbidelli | 7 | | | |
| 19 | 40 | (West Germany) Bernd Schneider | Bender | 7 | | | |
| 20 | 43 | (Netherlands) Jan Ubels | Buton | 7 | | | |
| | | (Austria) Harald Bartol | Morbidelli | | | 2 | |
| | | (France) Thierry Espié | Motobécane | | | 4 | |
| | | (Switzerland) Stefan Dörflinger | Morbidelli | | | 8 | |
| | | (France) Jean-Louis Guignabodet | Morbidelli | | | 11 | |
38 starters in total, 20 finishers

== 50 cc classification ==
| Pos | No. | Rider | Manufacturer | Laps | Time | Grid | Points |
|---|---|---|---|---|---|---|---|
| 1 | 36 | (Spain) Ricardo Tormo | Bultaco | 6 | 31:52.3 | 1 | 15 |
| 2 | 19 | (Italy) Eugenio Lazzarini | Kreidler | 6 | +56.1 | 3 | 12 |
| 3 | 48 | (Switzerland) Stefan Dörflinger | Kreidler | 6 | +2:23.2 | 2 | 10 |
| 4 | 23 | (Italy) Claudio Lusuardi | Bultaco | 6 | +2:24.6 | | 8 |
| 5 | 21 | (Netherlands) Peter Looyestein | Kreidler | 6 | +2:32.9 | 11 | 6 |
| 6 | 42 | (Belgium) Pierre Dumont | Kreidler | 6 | +2:48.7 | 7 | 5 |
| 7 | 15 | (West Germany) Hagen Klein | Kreidler | 6 | | 12 | 4 |
| 8 | 28 | (France) Patrick Plisson | ABF | 6 | | 8 | 3 |
| 9 | 38 | (Netherlands) Cees van Dongen | Kreidler | 6 | | | 2 |
| 10 | 35 | (Netherlands) Theo Timmer | Bultaco | 6 | | 10 | 1 |
| 11 | 14 | (France) Jacques Hutteau | ABF | 6 | | | |
| 12 | 26 | (West Germany) Wolfgang Müller | Kreidler | 6 | | 4 | |
| 13 | 9 | (Spain) Joaquín Gali | Bultaco | 6 | | | |
| 14 | 10 | (Spain) Ramón Gali | Bultaco | 6 | | | |
| 15 | 32 | (West Germany) Günter Schirnhofer | Kreidler | 6 | | | |
| 16 | 4 | (France) Daniel Corvi | Kreidler | 6 | | | |
| 17 | 40 | (Belgium) Chris Baert | Kreidler | 5 | | | |
| 18 | 46 | (Belgium) Marcel van der Steene | Kreidler | 5 | | | |
| 19 | 5 | (France) Michel de Poligny | Scrab | 5 | | | |
| 20 | 47 | (Belgium) Dirk van der Donckt | Kreidler | 5 | | | |
| | | (Austria) Otto Machinek | Kreidler | | | 5 | |
| | | (West Germany) Ingo Emmerich | Kreidler | | | 6 | |
| | | (Italy) Aldo Pero | Kreidler | | | 9 | |
40 starters in total, 24 finishers

== Sidecar classification ==
| Pos | No. | Rider | Passenger | Manufacturer | Laps | Time | Grid | Points |
|---|---|---|---|---|---|---|---|---|
| 1 | 12 | (Switzerland) Bruno Holzer | (Switzerland) Karl Meierhans | LCR-Yamaha | 9 | 47:50.0 | 7 | 15 |
| 2 | 18 | (France) Alain Michel | (United Kingdom) Stu Collins | Seymaz-Yamaha | 9 | +22.7 | 5 | 12 |
| 3 | 4 | (Switzerland) Rolf Biland | (United Kingdom) Kenny Williams | TTM-Yamaha | 9 | +28.3 | 3 | 10 |
| 4 | 32 | (West Germany) Rolf Steinhausen | (West Germany) Wolfgang Kalauch | Seymaz-Yamaha | 9 | +2:22.2 | 1 | 8 |
| 5 | 11 | (United Kingdom) Bill Hodgkins | (United Kingdom) John Parkins | Windle-Yamaha | 9 | +3:01.0 | | 6 |
| 6 | 44 | (United Kingdom) Jock Taylor | (United Kingdom) James Neil | Windle-Yamaha | 9 | | | 5 |
| 7 | 30 | (Netherlands) Cees Smit | (Netherlands) Jan Smit | Seymaz-Yamaha | 9 | | | 4 |
| 8 | 8 | (Switzerland) Gérard Corbaz | (Switzerland) Roland Gabriel | Schmid-Yamaha | 9 | | 9 | 3 |
| 9 | 10 | (United Kingdom) Dick Greasley | (United Kingdom) Gordon Russell | Busch-Yamaha | 9 | | 6 | 2 |
| 10 | 26 | (West Germany) Siegfried Schauzu | (West Germany) Lorenzo Puzo | Busch-Yamaha | 9 | | 8 | 1 |
| 11 | 16 | (West Germany) Helmut Luneman | (West Germany) Micha Stockel | Gespann-Yamaha | 9 | | | |
| 12 | 35 | (West Germany) Heinz Thevissen | (West Germany) Lothar Klein | HTS-Yamaha | 8 | +1 lap | | |
| 13 | 37 | (West Germany) Max Venus | (West Germany) Norbert Bitterman | CAT-Yamaha | 8 | +1 lap | | |
| 14 | 7 | (Netherlands) Boy Brouwer | (Netherlands) Jan Oostwouder | Coan-Yamaha | 8 | +1 lap | | |
| | | (West Germany) Werner Schwärzel | (West Germany) Andreas Huber | Fath | | | 2 | |
| | | (Sweden) Göte Brodin | (Sweden) Per-Erik Wickström | Yamaha | | | 4 | |
| | | (Switzerland) Hermann Schmid | (United Kingdom) Kenny Arthur | Schmid-Yamaha | | | 10 | |
30 starters in total, 14 finishers

| Previous race: 1978 Dutch TT | FIM Grand Prix World Championship; 1978 season | Next race: 1978 Swedish Grand Prix |
| Previous race: 1977 Belgian Grand Prix | Belgian Grand Prix | Next race: 1979 Belgian Grand Prix |
