= 1977 Finnish motorcycle Grand Prix =

Finnish Automobile Racing

(Finland) 1977 Finnish Grand Prix
Race details
- Race 11 of 13 races in the 1977 Grand Prix motorcycle racing season
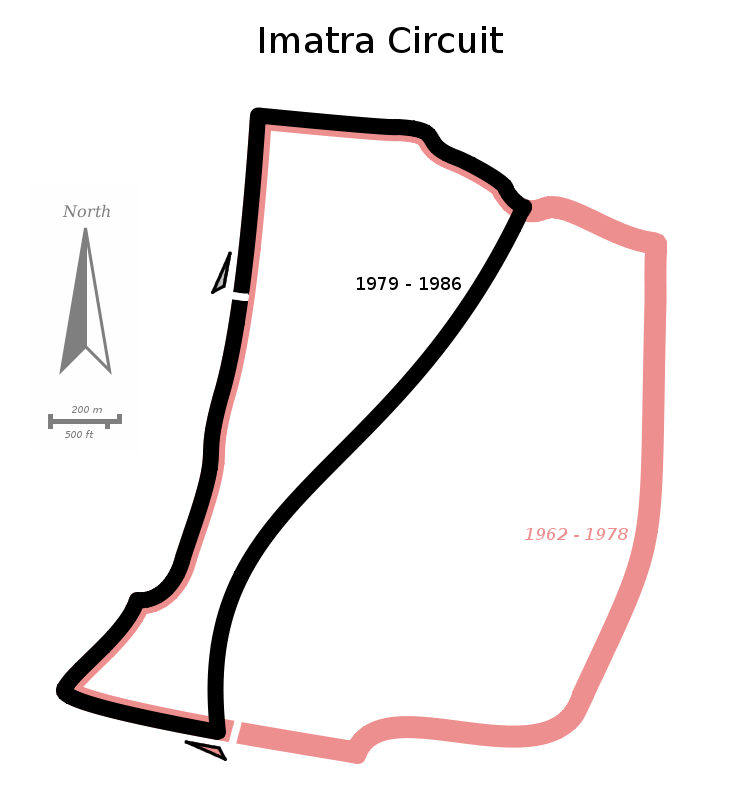
- Date: 31 July 1977
- Official name: Imatranajo Suomen Grand Prix/Finnish Grand Prix
- Location: Imatra Circuit
- Course: Permanent racing facility; 6.030 km (3.747 mi)

500cc
Pole position
- Rider: (United Kingdom) Barry Sheene
- Time: 2:06.700
Fastest lap
- Rider: (Venezuela) Johnny Cecotto
- Time: 2:05.900
Podium
- First: (Venezuela) Johnny Cecotto
- Second: (Italy) Marco Lucchinelli
- Third: (Italy) Gianfranco Bonera

350cc
Pole position
- Rider: (Venezuela) Johnny Cecotto
- Time: 2:13.200
Fastest lap
- Rider: (South Africa) Jon Ekerold (United Kingdom) Tom Herron
- Time: 2:14.400
Podium
- First: (Japan) Takazumi Katayama
- Second: (France) Christian Sarron
- Third: (South Africa) Jon Ekerold

250cc
Pole position
- Rider: (South Africa) Alan North
- Time: 2:18.900
Fastest lap
- Rider: (Italy) Walter Villa
- Time: 2:16.600
Podium
- First: (Italy) Walter Villa
- Second: (United Kingdom) Mick Grant
- Third: (South Africa) Kork Ballington

125cc
Pole position
- Rider: (Italy) Pierpaolo Bianchi
- Time: 2:23.700
Fastest lap
- Rider: (Italy) Pierpaolo Bianchi
- Time: 2:23.500
Podium
- First: (Italy) Pierpaolo Bianchi
- Second: (Italy) Eugenio Lazzarini
- Third: (France) Jean-Louis Guignabodet

The 1977 Finnish motorcycle Grand Prix was the eleventh round of the 1977 Grand Prix motorcycle racing season. It took place on 31 July 1977 at the Imatra circuit.

== 500cc classification ==
Pos.	No.	Rider	Team	Manufacturer	Time/Retired	Points
1	14	(Venezuela) Johnny Cecotto	Team Venemotos	Yamaha	46'50.000	15
2	4	(Italy) Marco Lucchinelli	Life Racing Team	Suzuki	+43.000	12
3	22	(Italy) Gianfranco Bonera	Team Nava Olio Fiat	Suzuki	+51.600	10
4	12	(France) Michel Rougerie	Elf	Suzuki	+1'04.700	8
5	21	(United Kingdom) Steve Parrish	Texaco Heron Team Suzuki	Suzuki	+1'17.200	6
6	7	(United Kingdom) Barry Sheene	Texaco Heron Team Suzuki	Suzuki	+1'18.700	5
7	2	(Finland) Teuvo Länsivuori	Life Racing Team	Suzuki	+1'56.500	4
8	26	(Italy) Armando Toracca	MC della Robbia	Suzuki	+1 lap	3
9	30	(Belgium) Jean-Philippe Orban	Jean-Philippe Orban Racing Team	Suzuki	+1 lap	2
10	11	(Austria) Karl Auer	MSC Rottenberg	Yamaha	+1 lap	1
11	20	(Denmark) Børge Nielsen		Suzuki	+1 lap	
12	25	(United States) Steve Baker	Yamaha Motor Company	Yamaha	+1 lap	
13	17	(United Kingdom) Alex George	Hermetite Racing International	Suzuki	+1 lap	
14	27	(Sweden) Bo Granath		Suzuki	+1 lap	
15	34	(Finland) Markku Matikainen	Länsivuori Team	Suzuki	+2 laps	
16	23	(Canada) Ron Kirkham		Yamaha	+2 laps	
17	39	(Belgium) Jean-Marc Toffolo		Yamaha	+2 laps	
18	36	(Finland) Ossi Nikkinen		Yamaha	+3 laps	
Ret	35	(Finland) Pentti Lehtelä		Yamaha	Retired	
Ret	3	(United States) Pat Hennen	Texaco Heron Team Suzuki	Suzuki	Retired	
Ret	42	(New Zealand) Stuart Avant	Sid Griffiths Racing	Suzuki	Retired	
Ret	9	(United Kingdom) John Williams	Team Appleby Glade	Suzuki	Retired	
Ret	37	(France) Christian Estrosi	Marlboro Masche Total	Suzuki	Retired	
Ret	1	(Italy) Giacomo Agostini	Team API Marlboro	Yamaha	Retired	
Ret	29	(France) Jean-Claude Hogrel		Yamaha	Retired	
Ret	10	(Finland) Kimmo Kopra		Suzuki	Retired	
Ret	8	(Australia) Jack Findlay	Hermetite Racing International	Suzuki	Retired	
Ret	16	(Italy) Virginio Ferrari	Team Nava Olio Fiat	Suzuki	Accident	
Ret	24	(Italy) Giovanni Rolando		Suzuki	Accident	
Ret	15	(Netherlands) Wil Hartog	Riemersma Racing	Suzuki	Retired	
DNS	??	(Finland) Teuvo Laakso		Suzuki	Did not start	
DNS	??	(France) Bernard Regoni		Suzuki	Did not start	
DNS	??	(United States) Kenny Roberts		Yamaha	Did not start	

== 350 cc classification ==
Pos	No.	Rider	Manufacturer	Laps	Time	Grid	Points
1	8	(Japan) Takazumi Katayama	Yamaha	21	48:14.9	10	15
2	18	(France) Christian Sarron	Yamaha	21	+3.3	4	12
3	19	(South Africa) Jon Ekerold	Yamaha	21	+5.3	15	10
4	4	(United Kingdom) Tom Herron	Yamaha	21	+16.0	2	8
5	12	(France) Patrick Pons	Yamaha	21	+42.3	19	6
6	7	(France) Olivier Chevallier	Yamaha	21	+1:21.6	9	5
7	38	(Finland) Seppo Rossi	Yamaha	21	+1:32.1		4
8	1	(Italy) Walter Villa	Harley-Davidson	21	+1:35.3	18	3
9	36	(Finland) Eero Hyvärinen	Yamaha	21	+1:35.5	20	2
10	21	(Austria) Karl Auer	Yamaha	21	+1:41.9		1
11	30	(Switzerland) Michel Frutschi	Yamaha	21	+1:49.5		
12	3	(United Kingdom) Chas Mortimer	Yamaha	21	+2:07.1	19	
13	10	(South Africa) Kork Ballington	Yamaha	21	+3:44.6	16	
14	28	(United Kingdom) Alex George	Yamaha	20	+1 lap		
15	37	(Finland) Reino Eskelinen	Yamaha	20	+1 lap		
		(Venezuela) Johnny Cecotto	Yamaha			1	
		(France) Patrick Fernandez	Yamaha			3	
		(Italy) Giacomo Agostini	Yamaha			5	
		(Italy) Mario Lega	Morbidelli			6	
		(South Africa) Alan North	Yamaha			7	
		(Finland) Pentti Korhonen	Yamaha			8	
		(France) Jean-François Baldé	Yamaha			11	
		(Belgium) Etienne Geeraerd	Yamaha			12	
		(Australia) John Dodds	Yamaha			13	
		(France) Michel Rougerie	Yamaha			14	
		(Finland) Pekka Nurmi	Yamaha			17	
30 starters in total

== 250 cc classification ==
Pos	No.	Rider	Manufacturer	Laps	Time	Grid	Points
1	1	(Italy) Walter Villa	Harley-Davidson	20	46:15.3	3	15
2	26	(United Kingdom) Mick Grant	Kawasaki	20	+0.3		12
3	11	(South Africa) Kork Ballington	Yamaha	20	+24.3	6	10
4	18	(Italy) Franco Uncini	Harley-Davidson	20	+26.5	7	8
5	4	(United Kingdom) Tom Herron	Yamaha	20	+28.2	2	6
6	9	(France) Patrick Fernandez	Yamaha	20	+34.7	8	5
7	24	(Italy) Mario Lega	Morbidelli	20	+37.9	10	4
8	27	(United Kingdom) Barry Ditchburn	Kawasaki	20	+38.4	9	3
9	10	(Italy) Paolo Pileri	Morbidelli	20	+38.6	11	2
10	6	(France) Olivier Chevallier	Yamaha	20	+38.9	14	1
11	30	(Switzerland) Hans Müller	Yamaha	20	+54.8	16	
12	12	(South Africa) Jon Ekerold	Yamaha	20	+1:11.2	17	
13	39	(Venezuela) Aldo Nannini	Yamaha	20	+1:14.3	19	
14	32	(Australia) Vic Soussan	Yamaha	20	+1:25.2	15	
15	5	(United Kingdom) Chas Mortimer	Yamaha	20	+1:33.5	18	
16	23	(Finland) Eero Hyvärinen	Yamaha	20	+1:52.2		
17	38	(Finland) Seppo Rossi	Yamaha	20	+2:00.8	20	
18	8	(Australia) John Dodds	Yamaha	20	+2:09.3		
19	40	(Japan) Ken Nemoto	Yamaha	19	+1 lap		
		(South Africa) Alan North	Yamaha			1	
		(Japan) Takazumi Katayama	Yamaha			4	
		(Finland) Pekka Nurmi	Yamaha			5	
		(Finland) Pentti Korhonen	Yamaha			12	
		(France) Jean-François Baldé	Yamaha			13	
31 starters in total

== 125 cc classification ==
Pos	No.	Rider	Manufacturer	Laps	Time	Grid	Points
1	1	(Italy) Pierpaolo Bianchi	Morbidelli	19	46:09.6	1	15
2	6	(Italy) Eugenio Lazzarini	Morbidelli	19	+9.6	2	12
3	5	(France) Jean-Louis Guignabodet	Morbidelli	19	+1:16.4	7	10
4	12	(Switzerland) Hans Müller	Morbidelli	19	+1:32.7	8	8
5	8	(Switzerland) Stefan Dörflinger	Morbidelli	19	+1:45.8	9	6
6	16	(Sweden) Per-Edward Carlson	Morbidelli	19	+2:20.0	16	5
7	36	(France) Thierry Espié	Motobécane	19	+2:23.2	13	4
8	33	(Sweden) Bengt Johansson	Morbidelli	19	+2:23.4	15	3
9	17	(France) Patrick Plisson	Morbidelli	19	+2:34.8	17	2
10	15	(Italy) Enrico Cereda	Morbidelli	18	+1 lap	12	
11	18	(Finland) Matti Kinnunen	Morbidelli	18	+1 lap	14	
12	19	(Austria) Hans Hummel	Morbidelli	18	+1 lap	20	
13	10	(Netherlands) Cees van Dongen	Morbidelli	18	+1 lap	19	
14	35	(Germany) Bernd Schneider	Bender	18	+1 lap		
15	28	(France) Jacques Hutteau	Morbidelli	18	+1 lap		
16	27	(Italy) Luigi Rinaudo	Morbidelli	18	+1 lap		
17	29	(Germany) Alfred Schmid	Morbidelli	18	+1 lap		
18	25	(Argentina) Guillermo Pérez	Morbidelli	18	+1 lap		
		(Spain) Ricardo Tormo	Bultaco			3	
		(Spain) Ángel Nieto	Bultaco			4	
		(Austria) Harald Bartol	Morbidelli			5	
		(Germany) Gert Bender	Bender			6	
		(Belgium) Julien van Zeebroeck	Motobécane			10	
		(France) Thierry Noblesse	Morbidelli			11	
		(Germany) Anton Mang	Morbidelli			18	
30 starters in total

Previous race: 1977 Swedish Grand Prix	FIM Grand Prix World Championship; 1977 season	Next race: 1977 Czechoslovak Grand Prix
Previous race: 1976 Finnish Grand Prix	Finnish Grand Prix	Next race: 1978 Finnish Grand Prix
