= 1978 Grand Prix motorcycle racing season =

Sports season

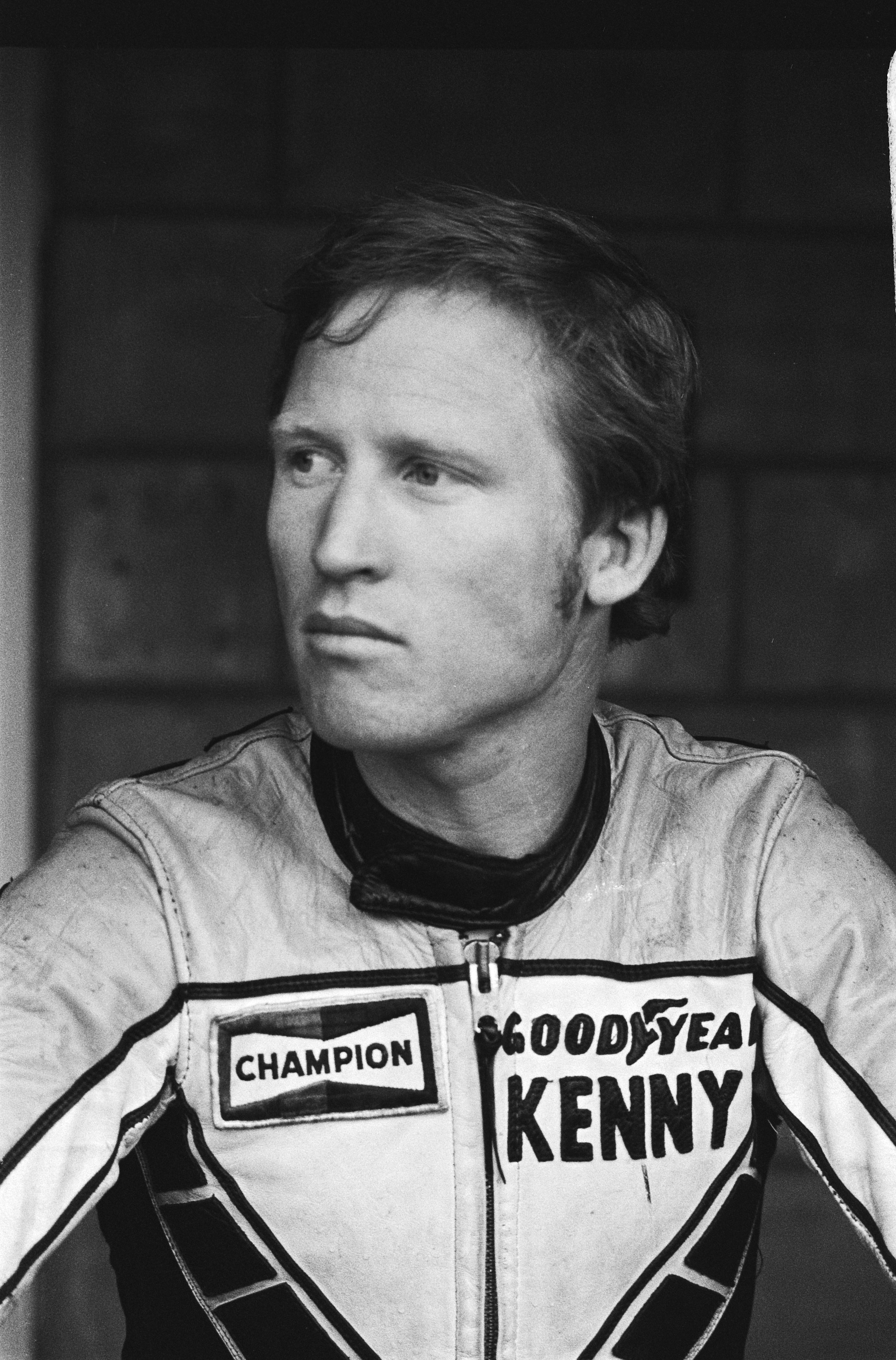
Kenny Roberts (pictured in Assen) became the 1978 500cc world champion

The 1978 Grand Prix motorcycle racing season was the 30th F.I.M. Road Racing World Championship season.

== Season summary ==
Yamaha rider Kenny Roberts became the first American competitor to win the 500cc World Championship. Roberts and Suzuki's defending champion Barry Sheene engaged in a season-long battle for the title that was not decided until the final race of the season. Roberts' victory came in only his first season of international competition after an impressive dirt track racing career in the AMA Grand National Championship. Roberts introduced a new riding style of sliding the rear tire that was bred on the dirt tracks of America. His riding style revolutionized motorcycle road racing and was widely adopted by other racers to become the new standard.

=== Roberts' arrival ===
Roberts rose to prominence by winning two consecutive AMA Grand National Championships in 1973 and 1974, but by 1976, Yamaha had failed to keep pace with the Harley-Davidson XR-750 that dominated AMA dirt track competitions. Without a competitive dirt track motorcycle, Yamaha's American importer (Yamaha USA) made the decision to enter Roberts into the 1978 FIM 500cc World Championship with former 250cc World Champion Kel Carruthers as his team manager and mechanics Nobby Clark and Trevor Tilbury. Clark had extensive experience as a Grand Prix mechanic, having previously been employed by the MV Agusta and Honda factory teams. Although Roberts considered himself primarily as a dirt track racer, he had developed a solid reputation as a road racer based on his performances at the Transatlantic Trophy match races as well as his victory at the prestigious 1977 Imola 200 pre-season race.

Roberts arrival came at a time when motorcycle engine development rapidly outpaced chassis and tire technology. As two-stroke engine technology continued to improve, tire manufacturers began producing wider tires to manage the increasing horsepower being developed. The wider tires created forces that made the motorcycle try to stand itself upright while leaned into a corner, which made it necessary for riders to hang off their motorcycles.

Roberts developed his riding style after observing 1972 250cc World Champion Jarno Saarinen riding at the 1972 Champion Spark Plug Classic held at the Ontario Motor Speedway. He experimented with Saarinen's technique and found that it helped settle the motorcycle. He adopted the cornering style and exaggerated the body shift even further by hanging off his motorcycle and holding his knee out until it skimmed the track surface. Roberts' riding style eventually led to the invention of knee protectors, known as sliders, which are now universally used by motorcycle road racers.

Prior to Roberts' arrival in Europe, motorcycle racers focused on attaining high entry speeds into corners, leaving braking until the last possible moment, then carving graceful arcs through the corners with both wheels in line. Roberts did just the opposite, braking early, then quickly applying the throttle which resulted in the rear tire breaking traction and spinning. The resulting tire spin caused the motorcycle to buck and shake as it continually lost then regained traction, creating a brutal, violent riding style that was reminiscent of dirt track riding, where sliding the rear tire to one side is used as a method to steer the motorcycle around a corner. Because of his early application of the throttle, he was able to attain top speed faster than his competitors.

Roberts' riding style astonished European motorsport journalists who had never witnessed a road racing motorcycle ridden in such a manner. He was given the nickname "Il Marciano," or The Martian, because, as Italian sports photographer Franco Villani stated, he was a small man dressed all in yellow and clearly from another world. Despite Roberts' previous achievements, motorsports journalists expected him to need one season of Grand Prix competition to become familiar with the European racetracks before challenging for the title.

=== Participants ===
There was a sense of anticipation before the start of the 1978 Grand Prix season. The popularity of reigning World Champion Barry Sheene had boosted the appeal of motorcycle racing beyond the specialty motorcycle press and into the realm of the mass media. He was the first motorcycle racer to gain commercial endorsements from outside the sport, including television advertisements for Brut cologne. Sheene's popularity helped attract renewed interest to Grand Prix motorcycle racing which had stagnated under the dominance of the MV Agusta team. The arrival of American champion Kenny Roberts added to the anticipation. Roberts had initially stated that he was indifferent about competing for the World Championships, but after reading a guest column written by Sheene in the Motor-Cycle News in which he dismissed Roberts as being, "No threat", citing the Yamaha rider's lack of familiarity with most of the European race circuits, the American rider made up his mind to compete.

The Yamaha factory supported three riders for the 1978 season. The 1975 350cc World Champion Johnny Cecotto rode for the Venezuelan Yamaha satellite team Venemotos, and 1977 350cc World Champion Takazumi Katayama rode for the Sarome & Motul Team based out of Yamaha International's Amsterdam headquarters, while Kenny Roberts rode for the Yamaha USA team. In order to gain more track time to learn the circuits, Roberts was also entered into the 250cc World Championship as well as the FIM Formula 750 championship. Roberts secured the financial backing of the Goodyear tire company, as well as exclusive use of their tires for the 1978 season.

The British-based Heron-Suzuki team continued to serve as the de facto factory team in the 500 Class, with two-time defending champion Sheene and Pat Hennen as their riders. The Suzuki factory also provided assistance for several privateer riders including Wil Hartog, Marco Lucchinelli and Teuvo Länsivuori. When the Yamaha team did not renew Steve Baker's contract after he finished second in the 1977 championship, he joined Virginio Ferrari on the Suzuki of Italy team operated by former Grand Prix racer Roberto Gallina.

Sheene quarreled with his Suzuki teammate Hennen at the pre-season 1978 Transatlantic Trophy match races. Sheene won the first of two races at Brands Hatch, but in the second race, Hennen was able to pass Sheene on the inside of the final corner to win the race. Sheene was angered by what he perceived as a dangerous pass and publicly berated his Suzuki teammate. Hennen was the top points scorer at the 1978 Transatlantic Match races, winning three races as well as two second places and one third place. Later in the week, Sheene continued the psychological warfare on his teammate when he repeated the accusation of dangerous riding in his guest column in Motor-Cycle News.

=== 500 class ===
Sheene began the season on March 19th with a victory in the Venezuelan Grand Prix, with his Suzuki teammate Hennen in second followed by Steve Baker in third place. Baker's third place was his best result of the year as his first season on a Suzuki was plagued with mechanical issues. Roberts' Yamaha suffered a mechanical failure on the starting line and he failed to finish the race. The championship then moved to Europe where Roberts would experience his first encounter with FIM bureaucracy at the Spanish Grand Prix.

When Roberts arrived at the 1978 Spanish Grand Prix, the race organizers denied his entry into the 500 cc race, as he had withdrawn from the previous Grand Prix without scoring any points. Spanish race organizers claimed to have no record of Roberts' previous 500cc class experience. Eventually the race organizers relented and Roberts was allowed to race. Chaffed by the way organizers treated competitors, an angered Roberts responded by taking the pole position and setting the lap record. In the race itself, Roberts led by eight seconds when his throttle stuck open, allowing Pat Hennen to pass and relegate him to second place. Sheene finished in fifth place allowing Hennen to take the championship points lead. Sheene had contracted a virus after the Venezuelan round that left him feeling weak and affected his results for the first part of the season. Suzuki had also produced a new version of the RG500 with a shortened frame for Sheene in 1978, and while the season had started with a victory, the new version proved to be a setback for the RG500's development.

Roberts won the first 500 cc Grand Prix of his career with a victory at the Austrian Grand Prix held at the Salzburgring circuit. Roberts' Yamaha teammate Cecotto finished in second place, taking valuable points away from Sheene who was relegated to third place. Hennen failed to finish the race in Austria. Roberts asserted himself as the new points leader with a second consecutive victory at the French Grand Prix while Hennen finished in second ahead of his teammate Sheene in third place. One week later at the Nations Grand Prix, Roberts won his third consecutive race ahead of Hennen and Marco Lucchinelli. Sheene finished in fifth place behind Steve Baker.

As the championship went into its summer break, Roberts held the championship points lead by five points over Hennen in second place with Sheene eight points behind in third place. During the mid-season break in the Grand Prix schedule, Hennen suffered career-ending injuries on June 5th while competing in the 1978 Isle of Man TT races. By 1978, most of the top Grand Prix riders, including Sheene refused to compete in the Isle of Man TT races due to the dangers of racing on a street circuit- especially one as legendarily dangerous as the 37.75 mile (60 km) Isle of Man TT Mountain Course. However, the British-based Suzuki factory team wanted one of its top riders entered into the event so, Hennen was called upon to race. Tom Herron was leading the race with Hennen aggressively pursuing him in second place when he crashed at Bishopscourt on the last lap of the race. Hennen's promising career was cut short when his injuries proved to be too severe and he was never able to compete again.

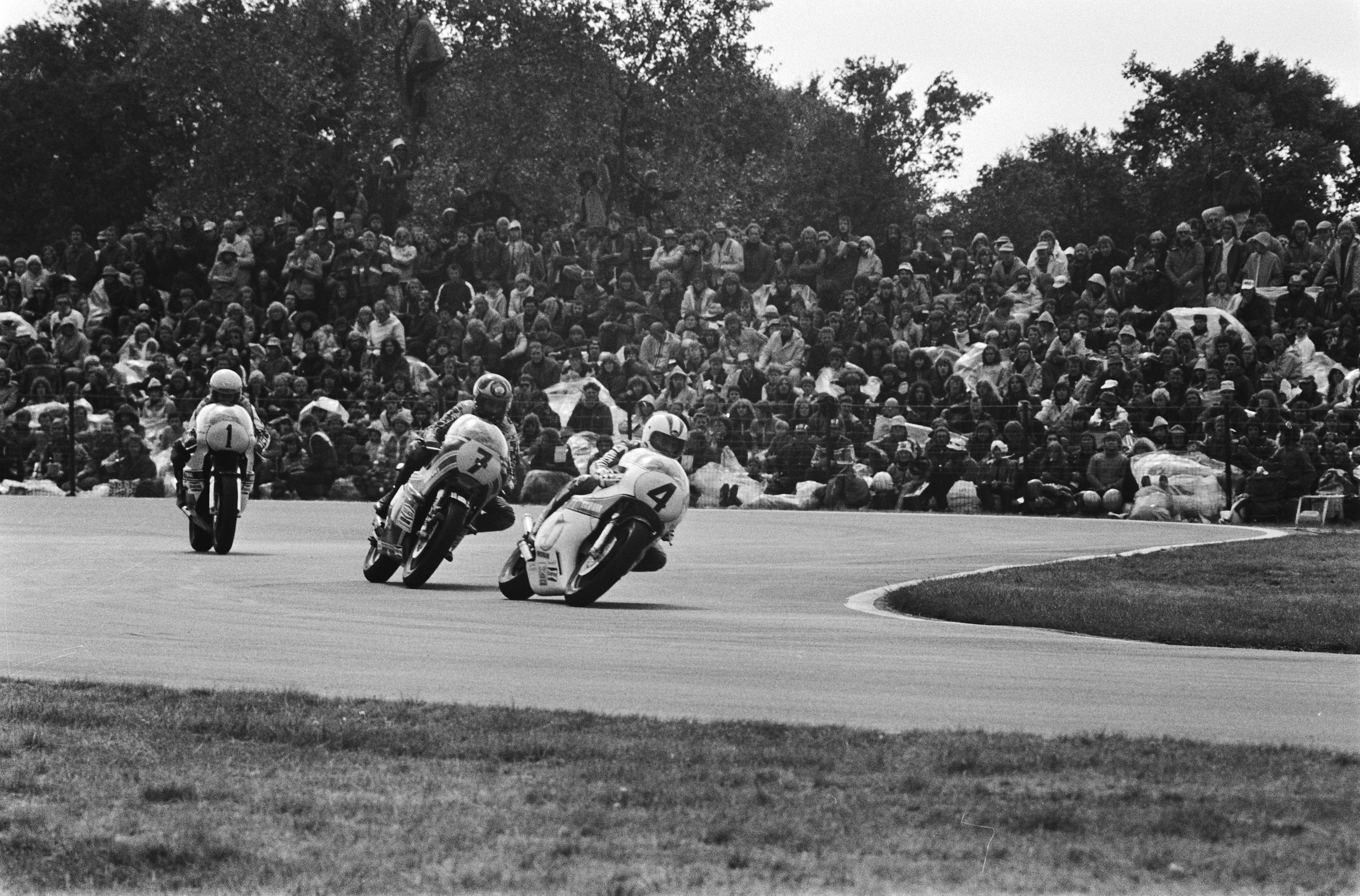
Johnny Cecotto (4) leads Barry Sheene (7) and Kenny Roberts (1) during the 1978 500cc Dutch TT race

The series resumed on June 24th at the Dutch TT where Roberts, Sheene and Cecotto engaged in a three-way battle for the lead. Cecotto prevailed to take the victory by one-tenth of a second over Roberts with Sheene three seconds behind in third place.

In the wake of Hennen's Isle of Man TT crash, the Suzuki factory contracted Dutch rider Wil Hartog as a replacement, ostensibly to help Sheene fend off the Yamahas of Roberts and Cecotto, however Sheene was unhappy when his new teammate won the Belgian Grand Prix with Roberts and Sheene once again finishing in second and third places respectively. Hartog had made the correct tire choice for the deteriorating weather conditions and was able to win by a 16-second margin.

A resurgent Sheene claimed a narrow victory over his teammate Hartog at the Swedish Grand Prix, while Roberts could do no better than seventh place after sustaining a concussion and a thumb injury when he crashed during practice for the 250 cc race. Sheene's victory in Sweden along with Roberts' misfortune allowed Sheene to narrow Roberts' points lead to three points with three rounds remaining. Gregg Hansford rode a twin-cylinder Kawasaki KR350 to claim the 350cc class pole position in Sweden with an impressive lap time that was faster than the 500cc class pole sitter, Johnny Cecotto.

At the Finnish Grand Prix, Roberts' Yamaha experienced a mechanical failure, however Sheene failed to capitalize on Roberts' misfortune when his Suzuki also experienced a failure allowing Hartog to claim his second victory of the season. It was at this crucial point in the season that Sheene's relationship with Suzuki began to sour. During a pre-race practice session, Sheene's well-trained ear thought he heard a failing crankshaft bearing in his engine. He requested that it be replaced, but his Suzuki mechanics disagreed with his assessment and refused his request. When the crankshaft failed during the race, the outspoken Sheene publicly criticised his team's decision.

The two championship contenders arrived in England for the penultimate round at the British Grand Prix still only separated by three points in the points standings. The race, held at the Silverstone Circuit, began under threatening skies when rain commenced at the midpoint. After a few laps of attempting to negotiate the wet racetrack on racing slick tires, the riders began to enter the pit lane for tire changes. Slick tires had only been introduced a few years earlier and the FIM rules at the time dictated that competitors were not allowed to change motorcycles during a race. This required the teams to perform tire changes mid-race, an operation that race teams seldom performed at the time. Roberts' team led by Carruthers changed his tires in less than 3 minutes, while the Sheene's pit crew took more than 7 minutes to change his tires. Sheene made a valiant effort to catch Roberts by reducing his lead to just over a minute by the end of the race. However, the race ended in controversy as the numerous pit stops for tire changes during a torrential rain created confusion among official scorers. Sheene protested that Roberts had not won the race, but eventually, Roberts was declared the winner with Sheene being awarded third place behind privateer Steve Manship, who did not stop for a tire change.

Roberts' victory gave him an eight-point lead going into the final round in West Germany. In order for Sheene to overtake Roberts and win the World Championship, he needed to win the final race with Roberts placing no higher than sixth. The West German Grand Prix was held at the daunting, 14.2-mile-long (22.9 km) Nürburgring racetrack, considered too dangerous for Formula One racing. Suzuki privateer, Virginio Ferrari won the first Grand Prix of his career just a half second ahead of Cecotto in second place. Roberts clinched the World Championship by finishing the race in third place just two seconds ahead of Sheene in fourth. Roberts' victory marked the first FIM World Championship for an American rider in Grand Prix road racing history. Sheene finished in second place, 10 points behind Roberts while Cecotto claimed third place in the final championship standings. Cecotto claimed seven pole positions during the season but failed to score points consistently. He was more successful in the 1978 Formula 750 world championship, where despite four victories by Roberts, Cecotto was able to score three victories along with three second-place finishes to secure the championship.

=== Smaller classes ===
A Spanish newcomer, Ricardo Tormo took five of seven rounds to claim the 50 cc title for Bultaco. Italy's Eugenio Lazzarini won the 125 cc crown aboard an MBA. South Africa's Kork Ballington pulled off an impressive double, winning the 250 cc and 350 cc titles for Kawasaki. He became the fourth competitor to accomplish the feat after Jim Redman (1962, 1963), Mike Hailwood (1966, 1967) and Walter Villa (1976).

== 1978 Grand Prix season calendar ==
Round	Date	Race	Location	50cc winner	125cc winner	250cc winner	350cc winner	500cc winner	Report
1	March 19	(Venezuela) Venezuelan Grand Prix	San Carlos		(Italy) Pier Paolo Bianchi	(United States) Kenny Roberts	(Japan) Takazumi Katayama	(United Kingdom) Barry Sheene	Report
2	April 16	(Spain) Spanish Grand Prix	Jarama	(Italy) Eugenio Lazzarini	(Italy) Eugenio Lazzarini	(Australia) Gregg Hansford		(United States) Pat Hennen	Report
3	April 30	(Austria) Austrian Grand Prix	Salzburgring		(Italy) Eugenio Lazzarini		(South Africa) Kork Ballington	(United States) Kenny Roberts	Report
4	May 7	(France) French Grand Prix	Nogaro		(Italy) Pier Paolo Bianchi	(Australia) Gregg Hansford	(Australia) Gregg Hansford	(United States) Kenny Roberts	Report
5	May 14	(Italy) Nations Grand Prix	Mugello	(Spain) Ricardo Tormo	(Italy) Eugenio Lazzarini	(South Africa) Kork Ballington	(South Africa) Kork Ballington	(United States) Kenny Roberts	Report
6	June 24	(Netherlands) Dutch TT	Assen	(Italy) Eugenio Lazzarini	(Italy) Eugenio Lazzarini	(United States) Kenny Roberts	(South Africa) Kork Ballington	(Venezuela) Johnny Cecotto	Report
7	July 2	(Belgium) Belgian Grand Prix	Spa-Francorchamps	(Spain) Ricardo Tormo	(Italy) Pier Paolo Bianchi	(Italy) Paolo Pileri		(Netherlands) Wil Hartog	Report
8	July 23	(Sweden) Swedish Grand Prix	Karlskoga		(Italy) Pier Paolo Bianchi	(Australia) Gregg Hansford	(Australia) Gregg Hansford	(United Kingdom) Barry Sheene	Report
9	July 30	(Finland) Finnish Grand Prix	Imatra		(Spain) Angel Nieto	(South Africa) Kork Ballington	(South Africa) Kork Ballington	(Netherlands) Wil Hartog	Report
10	August 6	(United Kingdom) British Grand Prix	Silverstone		(Spain) Angel Nieto	(Germany) Anton Mang	(South Africa) Kork Ballington	(United States) Kenny Roberts	Report
11	August 20	(West Germany) German Grand Prix	Nürburgring Nordschleife	(Spain) Ricardo Tormo	(Spain) Angel Nieto	(South Africa) Kork Ballington	(Japan) Takazumi Katayama	(Italy) Virginio Ferrari	Report
12	August 27	(Czechoslovakia) Czechoslovak Grand Prix	Brno	(Spain) Ricardo Tormo		(South Africa) Kork Ballington	(South Africa) Kork Ballington		Report
13	September 17	(Socialist Federal Republic of Yugoslavia) Yugoslavian Grand Prix	Rijeka	(Spain) Ricardo Tormo	(Spain) Angel Nieto	(Australia) Gregg Hansford	(Australia) Gregg Hansford		Report

== Final standings ==
=== Scoring system ===
Points were awarded to the top ten finishers in each race. All races counted towards the final standings.

(key)

Position	1st	2nd	3rd	4th	5th	6th	7th	8th	9th	10th
Points	15	12	10	8	6	5	4	3	2	1

=== 500cc final standings ===
Place	Rider	Team	Machine	VEN (Venezuela)	ESP (Spain)	AUT (Austria)	FRA (France)	NAT (Italy)	NED (Netherlands)	BEL (Belgium)	SWE (Sweden)	FIN (Finland)	GBR (United Kingdom)	GER (West Germany)	Points
1	(United States) Kenny Roberts	Yamaha USA	YZR500	Ret	2	1	1	1	2	2	7	Ret	1	3	110
2	(United Kingdom) Barry Sheene	Heron-Suzuki	RG500	1	5	3	3	5	3	3	1	Ret	3	4	100
3	(Venezuela) Johnny Cecotto	Venemotos-Yamaha	YZR500	Ret	4	2	Ret	Ret	1	Ret	6	3	7	2	66
4	(Netherlands) Wil Hartog	Riemersma Racing	RG500		9	7	5	6	5	1	2	1	Ret	Ret	65
5	(Japan) Takazumi Katayama	Sarome & Motul Team	YZR500	Ret	3	Ret	Ret	Ret	4	6	3	2	9	5	53
6	(United States) Pat Hennen	Heron-Suzuki	RG500	2	1	Ret	2	2							51
7	(United States) Steve Baker	Team Gallina Nava Olio Fiat	RG500	3	6	Ret	DNS	4	9	Ret	4	6	Ret	7	42
8	(Finland) Teuvo Länsivuori		RG500		7	5	Ret	7		5	8	4	5	9	39
9	(Italy) Marco Lucchinelli		RG500		Ret	4	Ret	3	Ret	7	Ret	Ret	4	Ret	30
10	(France) Michel Rougerie		RG500		14	6		Ret	6	4	Ret	Ret	11	6	23
11	(Italy) Virginio Ferrari	Team Gallina Nava Olio Fiat	RG500	Ret	Ret	Ret	17	Ret	Ret	Ret	5	Ret	10	1	22
12	(United Kingdom) Steve Parrish		RG500	4	10	Ret	7	Ret	10	Ret	15	5	15	13	20
13	(Netherlands) Boet van Dulmen		RG500		11	8	21	9	8	Ret	11	7	Ret	8	15
14	(United Kingdom) Steve Manship		RG500										2		12
15	(France) Christian Estrosi		RG500		8		4	Ret							11
16	(Italy) Graziano Rossi	Team Gallina Nava Olio Fiat	RG500				6	12	16	14		9	Ret	Ret	7
16	(United Kingdom) John Newbold	Ray Hamblin Motorcycles	RG500		Ret	Ret	18		7	Ret			8		7
18	(Venezuela) Roberto Pietri	Venemotos Yamaha	YZR500	5											6
18	(Italy) Gianni Rolando	Team Librenti	RG500		DNQ			10	Ret				6	Ret	6
20	(West Germany) Gerhard Vogt	Bill Smith Racing	YZR500	6			16		21	20		14	17	16	5
20	(Switzerland) Philippe Coulon	Marlboro Nava Total	RG500		Ret	11	20	8	11	Ret	9		16	20	5
22	(Italy) Leandro Becheroni		RG500	7			DNS								4
22	(United Kingdom) Alex George	Hermetite Racing International	RG500		18		11	14	14	8	10	Ret	13	15	4
22	(West Germany) Jürgen Steiner	Caramba Racing Team Bohme	RG500			14					Ret	8		10	4
25	(Belgium) Jean Philippe Orban	Team La Licorne	RG500		12	Ret	8								3
26	(Italy) Carlo Perugini		RG500				9	Ret							2
26	(United Kingdom) Tom Herron		RG500			Ret				9					2
26	(Italy) Gianfranco Bonera	Team Kiwi Yamoto	RG500			9	22		13				Ret	12	2
26	(Switzerland) Bruno Kneubühler	RSS Racing Team	RG500		16	10	Ret	Ret	Ret	Ret	14	10	Ret	Ret	2
27	(New Zealand) Dennis Ireland		RG500							10	Ret	Ret	Ret		1
27	(Australia) Kenny Blake		YZR500				10								1

=== 350cc standings ===
Place	Rider	Number	Country	Machine	Points	Wins
1	(South Africa) Kork Ballington	5	South Africa	Kawasaki	134	6
2	(Japan) Takazumi Katayama	1	Japan	Yamaha	77	2
3	(Australia) Gregg Hansford		Australia	Kawasaki	76	3
4	(South Africa) Jon Ekerold	3	South Africa	Yamaha	64	0
5	(United Kingdom) Tom Herron	2	United Kingdom	Yamaha	50	0
6	(France) Michel Rougerie	4	France	Yamaha	47	0
7	(Italy) Franco Bonera		Italy	Yamaha	37	0
8	(France) Patrick Fernandez	8	France	Yamaha	36	0
9	(Australia) Victor Soussan	12	Australia	Yamaha	34	0
10	(France) Olivier Chevallier	6	France	Yamaha	27	0
11	(Finland) Penti Korhonen		Finland	Yamaha	20	
12	(Italy) Franco Uncini		Italy	Yamaha	19	
13	(Italy) Paolo Pileri		Italy		18	
14	(United Kingdom) Mick Grant		United Kingdom	Kawasaki	16	
15	(France) Christian Sarron		France	Yamaha	15	
16	(West Germany) Anton Mang		West Germany	Kawasaki	14	
17	(France) Patrick Pons		France	Yamaha	9	
18	(Italy) Marco Lucchinelli		Italy	Yamaha	5	
19	(France) Guy Bertin		France	Yamaha	5	
20	(France) Eric Saul		France	Yamaha	4	
21	(Italy) Vanes Francini		Italy	Yamaha	3	
22	(France) Raymond Roche		France	Yamaha	3	
23	(Venezuela) Alejandro Aleman		Venezuela	Yamaha	2	
24	(Sweden) Leif Gustafsson		Sweden	Yamaha	2	
25	(Netherlands) Peter Van Der Wal		Netherlands	Yamaha	2	
26	(Italy) Gianni Pelletier		Italy	Yamaha	2	
27	(Italy) A.Piccioni		Italy	Yamaha	1	
28	(Finland) Eero Hyvärinen		Finland	Yamaha	1	
29	(France) Hervi Moineau		France	Yamaha	1	
30	(Switzerland) Roland Freymond		Switzerland	Yamaha	1	
31	(Italy) Mario Lega		Italy		1	

=== 250cc standings ===
Place	Rider	Number	Country	Machine	Points	Wins
1	(South Africa) Kork Ballington	6	South Africa	Kawasaki	124	4
2	(Australia) Gregg Hansford		Australia	Kawasaki	118	4
3	(France) Patrick Fernandez	10	France	Yamaha	55	0
4	(United States) Kenny Roberts	80	United States	Yamaha	54	2
5	(West Germany) Anton Mang		Germany	Kawasaki	52	1
6	(United Kingdom) Tom Herron	5	United Kingdom	Yamaha	48	0
7	(Italy) Mario Lega		Italy	Morbidelli	44	0
8	(Italy) Franco Uncini		Italy	Yamaha	42	0
9	(South Africa) Jon Ekerold	9	South Africa	Yamaha	40	0
10	(Italy) Paolo Pileri	31	Italy	Morbidelli	35	1
11	(France) Raymond Roche		France		26	
12	(France) Olivier Chevallier		France		25	
13	(France) Jean-François Baldé		France		19	
14	(United Kingdom) Mick Grant		United Kingdom		17	
15	(Australia) Victor Soussan		Australia		14	
16	(Italy) Walter Villa		Italy		13	
17	(Venezuela) Carlos Lavado		Venezuela		12	
18	(United Kingdom) Chas Mortimer		United Kingdom		12	
19	(Finland) Penti Korhonen		Finland		10	
20	(United Kingdom) Clive Padgett		United Kingdom		5	
21	(Switzerland) Hans Müller		Switzerland		5	
22	(Switzerland) Roland Freymond		Switzerland		4	
23	(United States) Ted Henter		United States		3	
24	(Finland) Pekka Nurmi		Finland		2	
25	(Australia) Ray Quincey		Australia		2	
26	(Venezuela) Alejandro Aleman		Venezuela		2	
27	(Australia) John Dodds		Australia		2	
28	(Sweden) Leif Gustafsson		Sweden		1	
29	(Japan) Sadao Asami		Japan		1	
30	(Finland) Eero Hyvärinen		Finland		1	
31	(France) Marc Fontan		France		1	
32	(France) Hervi Moineau		France		1	
33	(France) Guy Bertin		France		1	
34	(France) Thierry Espié		France		1	

=== 125cc standings ===
Place	Rider	Number	Country	Machine	Points	Wins
1	(Italy) Eugenio Lazzarini	2	Italy	MBA	114	4
2	(Spain) Angel Nieto	3	Spain	Minarelli	88	4
3	(Italy) Pier Paolo Bianchi	1	Italy	Minarelli	70	4
4	(Austria) Harald Bartol	7	Austria	Morbidelli	68	0
5	(France) Thierry Espié	27	France	Motobécane	62	0
6	(Italy) Maurizio Massimiani	11	Italy	Morbidelli	56	0
7	(Switzerland) Hans Müller	8	Switzerland	Morbidelli	48	0
8	(Sweden) Per-Edward Carlsson		Sweden	Morbidelli	46	0
9	(France) Jean-Louis Guignabodet		France	Morbidelli	42	0
10	(United Kingdom) Clive Horton		United Kingdom	MBA	25	0
11	Patrick Plisson		jpn		20	
12	Matti Kinnunen		Kor		18	
13	Stefan Dörflinger		jpn		17	
14	Pierluigi Conforti		fra		16	
15	August Auinger		fra		14	
16	Christian Leon		Fra		10	
17	Thierry Noblesse		ita		9	
18	Alejandro Aleman		ita		8	
19	Felice Agostini		ita		7	
20	Ricardo Russo		Gbr		6	
21	Cees van Dongen		gbr		6	
22	Claudio Granata		gbr		5	
23	Gert Bender		isl		5	
24	Walter Koschine		Isl		5	
25	Hiroshi		isl		4	
26	Luciano Schiavone		irl		4	
27	Hiroshi		irl		3	
28	Rolf Blatter		irl		3	
29	Henk van Kessel		Spa		2	
30	Alois Meyer		spa		1	
31	Benny Janssen		spa		1	
32	Ricardo Tormo		Aus		1	
33	Enrico Cereda		Aus		1	
34	Hiroshi		aus		1	

=== 50cc standings ===
Place	Rider	Number	Country	Machine	Points	Wins
1	(Spain) Ricardo Tormo	3	Spain	Bultaco	99	5
2	(Italy) Eugenio Lazzarini	2	Italy	Kreidler	64	2
3	(France) Patrick Plisson	5	France	ABF	48	0
4	(West Germany) Wolfgang Müller	20	West Germany	Kreidler	28	0
5	(Switzerland) Rolf Blatter	17	Switzerland	Kreidler	25	0
6	(Switzerland) Stefan Dörflinger	6	Switzerland	Kreidler	24	0
7	(Italy) Claudio Lusuardi	18	Italy	Bultaco	20	0
8	(Netherlands) Peter Looijensteijn	27	Netherlands	Kreidler	14	0
9	(West Germany) Ingo Emmerich	23	West Germany	Kreidler	14	0
10	(Italy) Aldo Pero	15	Italy	Kreidler	13	0
11	(Spain) Angel Nieto				12	
12	(Netherlands) Henk van Kessel				11	
13	(Italy) Enrico Cereda				11	
14	(Belgium) Julien Vanzeebroeck				10	
15	(Netherlands) Cees van Dongen				10	
16	Willi Scheidhauer				10	
17	Hagen Klein				9	
18	Theo Timmer				9	
19	C.Dumont				6	
20	Daniel Corvi				5	
21	Gerrit Strikker				4	
22	Luigi Rinaudo				4	
23	Ramon Gali				3	
24	A.Jeva				3	
25	S.Monreale				2	
26	Zbynek Havdra				2	
27	J.Mira				1	
28	Jacques Hutteau				1	
