= Mario Lega =

Italian motorcycle racer

- Nationality: Italian
Motorcycle racing career statistics
Grand Prix motorcycle racing
Active years	1973 - 1978
First race	1973 350cc Nations Grand Prix
Last race	1978 250cc Yugoslavian Grand Prix
First win	1977 250cc Yugoslavian Grand Prix
Last win	1977 250cc Yugoslavian Grand Prix
Team	Morbidelli
Championships	250cc - 1977
Starts / Wins / Podiums / Poles / F. laps / Points; 28 / 1 / 9 / 0 / 1 / 179

Mario Lega (born 20 February 1949) is an Italian former professional motorcycle racer and telephone technician. He competed in Grand Prix motorcycle racing between 1973 and 1978, most prominently as a member of the Morbidelli racing team where he won the 1977 250cc World Championship.

== Motorcycle racing career ==
Lega was born on 20 February 1949 in Lugo, Emilia-Romagna, Italy. He began his motorcycle racing career in 1966 in the Italian Cadet Championship class. He won the 1970 Italian Junior National Championship riding a Yamaha TD2 and was promoted to the Senior Class in 1972. Although he raced motorcycles professionally, his main occupation was as a telephone technician for the Italian state-owned telecommunications company, SIP, where he continued to be employed throughout his motorcycle racing career.

At the age of 24, Lega scored his first World Championship points with a fourth place at the 1973 Yugoslavian Grand Prix. In 1974, he won the 350cc Italian National Championship and finished second to Giacomo Agostini (MV Agusta) at the 1974 350cc Nations Grand Prix.

In 1977, Giancarlo Morbidelli asked Lega to join the Morbidelli team as a substitute rider, replacing the injured Paolo Pileri in the 250cc World Championship. The 1977 season was one of the most competitive in years with seven different race winners in the first seven races of the year. Lega scored a surprise victory over Takazumi Katayama at the 250cc Yugoslavian Grand Prix for the only win of his World Championship career. His victory in Yugoslavia vaulted him into the championship points lead prompting Morbidelli to ask Lega to remain on the team for the remainder of the season. Lega scored three more podiums to clinch the 1977 250cc World Championship, ending the three-year reign of the Harley-Davidson-owned Aermacchi team and their rider Walter Villa. He also won the 350cc Italian National Championship for the second time in 1977.

Lega returned to the Morbidelli team for the 1978 250cc World Championship. He scored two podium results however, the season was dominated by the Kawasaki team of Kork Ballington and Gregg Hansford riding the Kawasaki KR250. Lega ended the season ranked seventh in the championship.

In 1979, Lega returned to the Italian national championship as well as the European Endurance Championship where he teamed up with Víctor Palomo on a Ducati to place eighth place in the overall standings. He retired after the 1979 season and continued his career with the SIP telephone company. Lega later wrote for La Gazzetta dello Sport as a commentator on Grand Prix motorcycle racing.

== Grand Prix motorcycle racing results ==
Points system from 1969 onwards:

**Position**	1	2	3	4	5	6	7	8	9	10
**Points**	15	12	10	8	6	5	4	3	2	1

(key) (Races in bold indicate pole position; races in italics indicate fastest lap)

Year	Class	Team	1	2	3	4	5	6	7	8	9	10	11	12	13	Points	Rank	Wins
1973	250cc	Yamaha	FRA -	AUT -	GER -		IOM -	YUG; 4	NED -	BEL -	CZE; 10	SWE -	FIN -	ESP -		9	22nd	0
1973	350cc	Yamaha	FRA -	AUT -	GER -	NAT; 8	IOM -	YUG -	NED -		CZE -	SWE -	FIN -	ESP -		3	36th	0
1973	500cc	Yamaha	FRA -	AUT -	GER -		IOM -	YUG -	NED -	BEL -	CZE; 7	SWE -	FIN -	ESP -		4	34th	0
1974	350cc	Yamaha	FRA -	GER -	AUT -	NAT; 2	IOM -	NED -	BEL -	SWE -	FIN -	CZE -				12	18th	0
1975	250cc	Yamaha	FRA -	ESP -		GER -	NAT; 6	IOM -	NED -	BEL -	SWE -	FIN -	CZE -	YUG -		5	26th	0
1975	350cc	Yamaha	FRA -	ESP -	AUT -	GER -	NAT -	IOM -	NED -			FIN -	CZE -	YUG; 7		4	32nd	0
1977	250cc	Morbidelli	VEN; 9	GER -	NAT; 2	ESP; 5	FRA; 4	YUG; 1	NED; 5	BEL; 3	SWE; 2	FIN; 7	CZE; 3	GBR -		85	**1st**	1
1977	350cc	Morbidelli	VEN -	GER -	NAT; 2	ESP -	FRA -	YUG -	NED -		SWE; 11	FIN -	CZE -	GBR -		12	19th	0
1978	250cc	Morbidelli	VEN; 6	ESP; 6		FRA -	NAT -	NED; 10	BEL; 6	SWE; 7	FIN; 3	GBR -	GER -	CZE; 3	YUG; 7	44	7th	0
1978	350cc	Yamaha	VEN -		AUT -	FRA -	NAT; 10	NED -	BEL -	SWE -	FIN -	GBR -	GER -	CZE -	YUG -	1	27th	0
