= Pierluigi Conforti =

Italian motorcycle racer (born 1946)

- Nationality: Italian
Motorcycle racing career statistics
Grand Prix motorcycle racing
Active years	1975 - 1982
First race	1975 125cc Nations Grand Prix
Last race	1982 250cc Nations Grand Prix
First win	1977 125cc British Grand Prix
Last win	1977 125cc British Grand Prix
Starts / Wins / Podiums / Poles / F. laps / Points; 15 / 1 / 4 / 0 / 0 / 100

Pierluigi Conforti (born 15 June 1946) was an Italian Grand Prix motorcycle road racer. His best year was in 1977 when he won the 125cc British Grand Prix and finished in tenth place in the 125cc world championship.
