= Roland Freymond =

Swiss motorcycle racer

- Nationality: (Switzerland) Swiss
Motorcycle racing career statistics
Grand Prix motorcycle racing
Active years	1978 - 1986
First race	1978 250cc British Grand Prix
Last race	1986 250cc San Marino Grand Prix
First win	1982 250cc Swedish Grand Prix
Last win	1982 250cc Swedish Grand Prix
Team	Morbidelli
Starts / Wins / Podiums / Poles / F. laps / Points; 82 / 1 / 10 / 0 / 1 / 294

Roland Freymond (born on 15 March 1953) was a Grand Prix motorcycle road racer from Switzerland. His best years were in 1981 and 1982 when he finished in third place in the 250cc world championship. Freymond won one Grand Prix race during his career, the 1982 250cc Swedish Grand Prix.
