= Per-Edward Carlson =

Swedish motorcycle racer

Pehr-Edward Carlson
- Nationality: (Sweden) Swedish
Motorcycle racing career statistics
Grand Prix motorcycle racing
Active years	1975 - 1979, 1981 - 1983
First race	1975 125cc Swedish Grand Prix
Last race	1983 125cc San Marino Grand Prix
Starts / Wins / Podiums / Poles / F. laps / Points; 105 / 0 / 1 / 0 / 0 / 62

Per-Edward "Bam" Carlson is a Swedish former professional Grand Prix motorcycle road racer. His best year was in 1978, when he finished eighth in the 125cc world championship.
