= Maurizio Massimiani =

Italian motorcycle racer (born 1953)

- Nationality: Italian
- Born: 22 September 1953 (age 73); Scandriglia, Italy
Motorcycle racing career statistics
Grand Prix motorcycle racing
Active years	1977 - 1981, 1983
First race	1977 125cc Nations Grand Prix
Last race	1983 500cc San Marino Grand Prix
Starts / Wins / Podiums / Poles / F. laps / Points; 32 / 0 / 11 / 0 / 0 / 166

Maurizio Massimiani (born 22 September 1953) is an Italian former professional Grand Prix motorcycle road racer.

Massimiani was born in Scandriglia, Italy. His best year was in 1979 when he finished second in the 125cc world championship.
