= Patrick Plisson =

French motorcycle racer

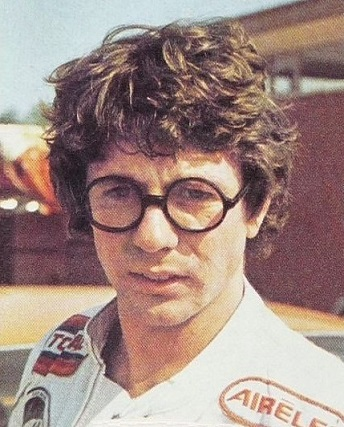
- Patrick Plisson in 1978.
- Nationality: French
- Born: May 10, 1952 (age 74); Orléans, France
Motorcycle racing career statistics
Grand Prix motorcycle racing
Active years	1976 - 1979
First race	1976 125cc Belgian Grand Prix
Last race	1979 50cc French Grand Prix
Starts / Wins / Podiums / Poles / F. laps / Points; 25 / 0 / 7 / 0 / 1 / 145

Patrick Plisson (born May 10, 1952 in Orléans) is a former Grand Prix motorcycle road racer from France. His best years were in 1978 and 1979 when he finished in third place in the 50cc world championship.
