= Victor Soussan =

Australian motorcycle racer

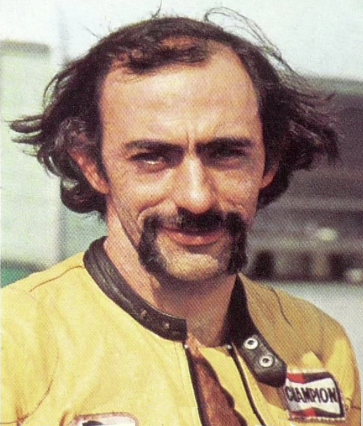
- Victor Soussan in 1978.
- Nationality: Australian / France
- Born: 28 March 1946; Casablanca, French Morocco

Victor Soussan (born 28 March 1946 in Casablanca) is an Australian private former Grand Prix motorcycle racer of French Moroccan descent.

== Career statistics ==
=== By season ===
Season	Class	Motorcycle	Race	Win	Podium	Pole	FLap	Pts	Plcd
1977	250cc	Yamaha	5	0	1	0	0	25	12th
1977	350cc	Yamaha	4	0	0	0	0	21	12th
1978	250cc	Yamaha	5	0	0	0	0	14	15th
1978	350cc	Yamaha	7	0	0	0	0	34	9th
1979	250cc	Yamaha	2	0	1	0	0	11	17th
1979	350cc	Yamaha	3	0	0	0	0	8	21st
Total			26	0	2	0	0	113	
