= 1976 Dutch TT =

(Netherlands) 1976 Dutch TT
Race details
- Race 6 of 12 races in the 1976 Grand Prix motorcycle racing season
- Date: 27 June 1976
- Official name: Dutch TT Assen
- Location: Circuit van Drenthe Assen
- Course: Permanent racing facility; 7.718 km (4.796 mi)

500cc
Pole position
Rider	(United Kingdom) Barry Sheene	Suzuki
Time	2:57.900	
Fastest lap
Rider	(United Kingdom) Barry Sheene	Suzuki
Time	2:59.600	
Podium
First	(United Kingdom) Barry Sheene	Suzuki
Second	(United States) Pat Hennen	Suzuki
Third	(Netherlands) Wil Hartog	Suzuki

350cc
Pole position
Rider	(Japan) Takazumi Katayama	Yamaha
Time	3:02.700	
Fastest lap
Rider	(Italy) Giacomo Agostini	MV Agusta
Time	3:03.100	
Podium
First	(Italy) Giacomo Agostini	MV Agusta
Second	(France) Patrick Pons	Yamaha
Third	(United Kingdom) Chas Mortimer	Yamaha

250cc
Pole position
Rider	(Italy) Walter Villa	Harley-Davidson
Time	3:08.400	
Fastest lap
Rider	(Italy) Walter Villa	Harley-Davidson
Time	3:05.900	
Podium
First	(Italy) Walter Villa	Harley-Davidson
Second	(Japan) Takazumi Katayama	Yamaha
Third	(Australia) John Dodds	Yamaha

125cc
Pole position
Rider	(Italy) Pierpaolo Bianchi	Morbidelli
Time	3:17.100	
Fastest lap
Rider	(Italy) Pierpaolo Bianchi	Morbidelli
Time	3:13.700	
Podium
First	(Italy) Pierpaolo Bianchi	Morbidelli
Second	(Italy) Paolo Pileri	Morbidelli
Third	(Spain) Ángel Nieto	Bultaco

50cc
Pole position
Rider	(Spain) Ángel Nieto	Bultaco
Time	3:37.700	
Fastest lap
Rider	(Italy) Eugenio Lazzarini (Switzerland) Ulrich Graf	Kreidler; Kreidler
Time	3:38.000	
Podium
First	(Spain) Ángel Nieto	Bultaco
Second	(Switzerland) Ulrich Graf	Kreidler
Third	(West Germany) Herbert Rittberger	Kreidler

Sidecar (B2A)
Pole position
Rider	(Switzerland) Rolf Biland	Yamaha
Passenger	(United Kingdom) Ken Williams	
Time	3:15.900	
Fastest lap
Rider	(West Germany) Werner Schwärzel	König
Passenger	(West Germany) Andreas Huber	
Time	3:16.700	
Podium
First rider	(Switzerland) Hermann Schmid	Yamaha
First passenger	(Switzerland) Jean-Pierre Martial	
Second rider	(Netherlands) Martin Kooy	König
Second passenger	(Netherlands) Rob Vader	
Third rider	(West Germany) Gustav Pape	König
Third passenger	(West Germany) Franz Kallenberg	

The 1976 Dutch TT was the sixth round of the 1976 Grand Prix motorcycle racing season. It took place on 27 June 1976 at the Circuit van Drenthe Assen.

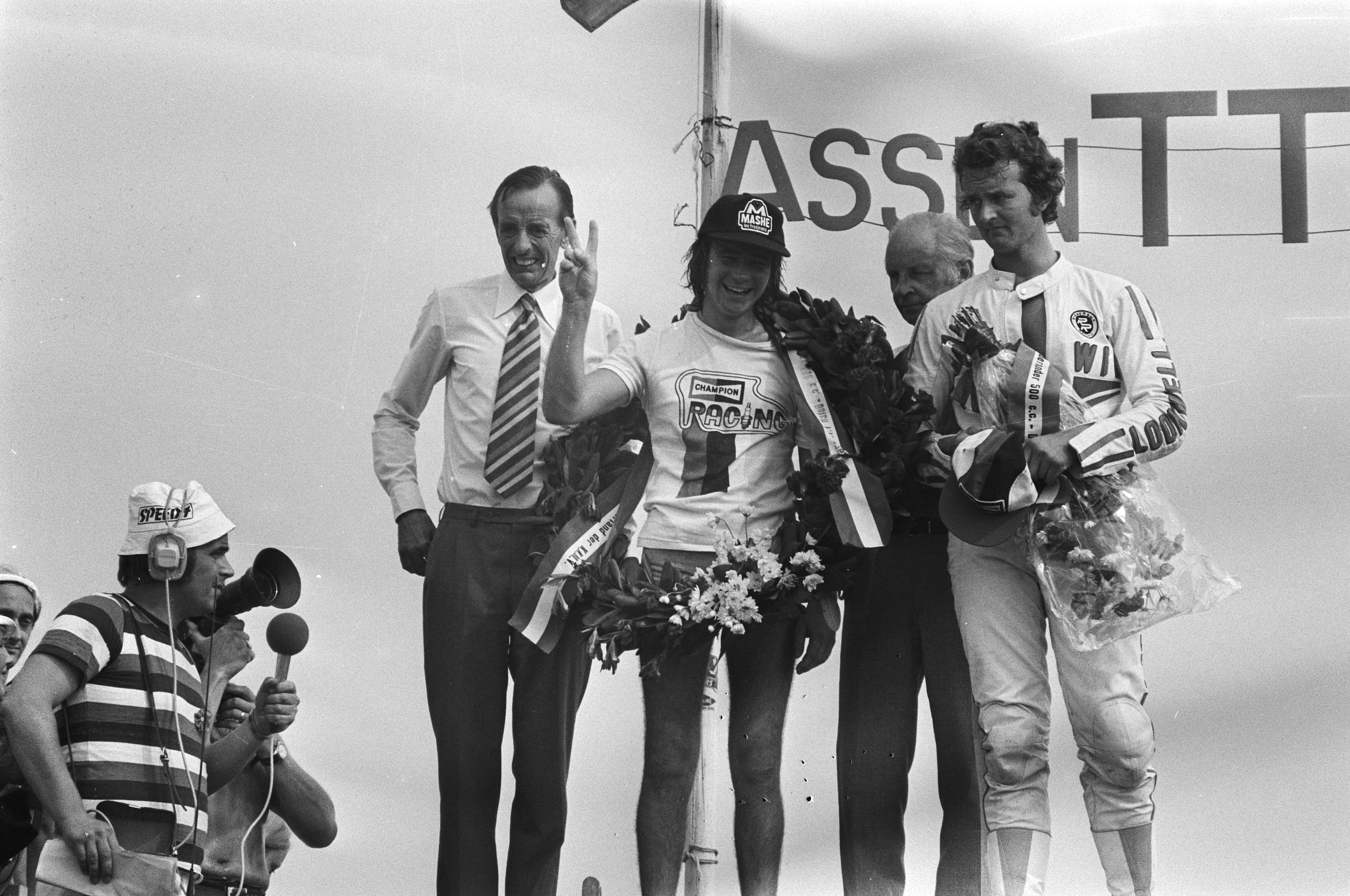
Barry Sheene and Wil Hartog, celebrating on the podium after finishing first and third at the 500cc race.

== 500cc classification ==
Pos.	No.	Rider	Team	Manufacturer	Time/Retired	Points
1	7	(United Kingdom) Barry Sheene	Texaco Heron Team Suzuki	Suzuki	48'44.900	15
2	25	(United States) Pat Hennen	Colemans	Suzuki	+45.600	12
3	31	(Netherlands) Wil Hartog	Riemersma Racing	Suzuki	+1'05.400	10
4	3	(United Kingdom) Alex George	Hermetite Racing International	Yamaha	+1'13.400	8
5	6	(Australia) Jack Findlay	Jack Findlay Racing	Suzuki		6
6	30	(United Kingdom) John Williams	Texaco Heron Team Suzuki	Suzuki		5
7	13	(France) Bernard Fau		Yamaha		4
8	38	(Netherlands) Rob Bron		Yamaha		3
9	19	(Germany) Helmut Kassner		Suzuki		2
10	24	(United Kingdom) Dave Potter		Yamaha		1
11	34	(Netherlands) Piet van der Wal		Yamaha		
12	23	(Austria) Hans Braumandl	MSC Rottenberg	Yamaha		
Ret	11	(Italy) Giacomo Agostini	Team API Marlboro	Suzuki	Retired	
Ret	??	(West Germany) Horst Lahfeld		König	Retired	
Ret	20	(France) Michel Rougerie		Suzuki	Retired	
Ret	??	(France) Christian Estrosi		Suzuki	Dizziness	
Ret	??	(France) Jean-Paul Boinet	Ecurie Jean Murit	Suzuki	Retired	
Ret	??	(Switzerland) Philippe Coulon		Suzuki	Dizziness	
Ret	??	(Finland) Teuvo Länsivuori	Life Racing Team	Suzuki	Retired	
Ret	??	(West Germany) Hans-Otto Butenuth		Yamaha	Retired	
Ret	32	(New Zealand) Stuart Avant	Colemans	Suzuki	Retired	
Ret	51	(Netherlands) Boet van Dulmen	Laponder Racing	Yamaha	Dizziness	
Ret	27	(Netherlands) Marcel Ankoné	Nimag Suzuki	Suzuki	Infection	
Ret	??	(Netherlands) Dick Alblas		König	Spark plugs	
Ret	??	(Netherlands) Kees van der Kruijs		Yamaha	Infection	
Ret	??	(South Africa) Kork Ballington		Yamaha	Retired	
Ret	??	(United Kingdom) John Newbold	Texaco Heron Team Suzuki	Suzuki	Retired	
Ret	12	(Austria) Karl Auer	Racing Team NO	Yamaha	Retired	
Ret	2	(United Kingdom) Phil Read	Team Life International	Suzuki	Infection	
Ret	??	(Italy) Gianfranco Bonera	AMF Harley-Davidson	Harley Davidson	Retired	
Ret	??	(Belgium) Jean-Philippe Orban		Yamaha	Retired	

== 350 cc classification ==
Pos	No.	Rider	Manufacturer	Laps	Time	Grid	Points
1	2	(Italy) Giacomo Agostini	MV Agusta	16	49:30.4	6	15
2	5	(France) Patrick Pons	Yamaha	16	+24.1	4	12
3	6	(United Kingdom) Chas Mortimer	Yamaha	16	+46.3		10
4	19	(Switzerland) Bruno Kneubühler	Yamaha	16	+50.7	8	8
5	24	(Australia) John Dodds	Yamaha			2	6
6	31	(Italy) Franco Uncini	Yamaha			10	5
7	8	(United Kingdom) Tom Herron	Yamaha				4
8	1	(Venezuela) Johnny Cecotto	Yamaha			9	3
9	4	(Germany) Dieter Braun	Morbidelli				2
10	38	(France) Philippe Bouzanne	Yamaha				1
11	15	(France) Olivier Chevallier	Yamaha				
12	11	(Switzerland) Philippe Coulon	Yamaha				
13	10	(United Kingdom) Alex George	Yamaha				
14	34	(Netherlands) Piet van der Wal	Yamaha				
15	36	(Netherlands) Bert Struyk	Yamaha				
Ret		(Japan) Takazumi Katayama	Yamaha			1	
Ret		(Spain) Víctor Palomo	Yamaha			3	
Ret		(France) Gérard Choukroun	Yamaha			5	
Ret		(Italy) Walter Villa	Harley-Davidson			7	
30 starters in total

== 250 cc classification ==
Pos	No.	Rider	Manufacturer	Laps	Time	Grid	Points
1	1	(Italy) Walter Villa	Harley-Davidson	15	47:31.4	1	15
2	38	(Japan) Takazumi Katayama	Yamaha	15	+16.2	2	12
3	13	(Australia) John Dodds	Yamaha	15	+37.8	7	10
4	20	(Italy) Gianfranco Bonera	Harley-Davidson	15	+44.2	8	8
5	9	(Spain) Víctor Palomo	Yamaha			9	6
6	26	(France) Patrick Fernandez	Yamaha				5
7	11	(United Kingdom) Tom Herron	Yamaha				4
8	7	(Switzerland) Bruno Kneubühler	Yamaha			6	3
9	37	(Germany) Dieter Braun	Yamaha				2
10	42	(Italy) Franco Uncini	Yamaha			10	1
11	39	(France) Bernard Fau	Yamaha				
12	28	(South Africa) Jon Ekerold	Yamaha				
13	29	(Finland) Pekka Nurmi	Yamaha				
14	32	(Netherlands) Marcel Ankoné	Yamaha				
15	17	(France) Olivier Chevallier	Yamaha				
16	33	(Netherlands) Henk van Kessel	Yamaha				
17	14	(Germany) Rolf Minhoff	Yamaha				
18	31	(Soviet Union) Mati Reinup	MZ				
Ret		(Italy) Paolo Pileri	Morbidelli			3	
Ret		(France) Philippe Bouzanne	Yamaha			4	
Ret		(France) Patrick Pons	Yamaha			5	
30 starters in total

== 125 cc classification ==
Pos	No.	Rider	Manufacturer	Laps	Time	Grid	Points
1	2	(Italy) Pierpaolo Bianchi	Morbidelli	14	46:38.0	1	15
2	1	(Italy) Paolo Pileri	Morbidelli	14	+47.2	2	12
3	21	(Spain) Ángel Nieto	Bultaco	14	+1:01.3	5	10
4	26	(France) Jean-Louis Guignabodet	Morbidelli			9	8
5	22	(Switzerland) Stefan Dörflinger	Morbidelli			7	6
6	37	(Germany) Anton Mang	Morbidelli				5
7	9	(Netherlands) Cees van Dongen	Morbidelli				4
8	4	(Italy) Eugenio Lazzarini	Morbidelli				3
9	23	(Switzerland) Xaver Tschannen	Harley-Davidson				2
10	36	(France) Pierre-Jean Cecchini	Maico				1
11	8	(Switzerland) Hans Müller	Yamaha				
12	32	(Netherlands) Piet van Niel	Yamaha				
13	16	(Finland) Pentti Salonen	Yamaha				
14	15	(Sweden) Hans Hallberg	Yamaha				
15	34	(Netherlands) Bert Klaassens	Yamaha				
16	24	(Belgium) Julien van Zeebroeck	Morbidelli				
Ret		(Italy) Claudio Lusuardi	Morbidelli			3	
Ret		(Netherlands) Henk van Kessel	AGV Condor			4	
Ret		(Germany) Gert Bender	Bender			6	
Ret		(Germany) Horst Seel	Seel EB			8	
Ret		(Sweden) Kent Andersson	Yamaha			10	
30 starters in total

== 50 cc classification ==
Pos	No.	Rider	Manufacturer	Laps	Time	Grid	Points
1	1	(Spain) Ángel Nieto	Bultaco	9	33:10.4	1	15
2	12	(Switzerland) Ulrich Graf	Kreidler	9	+18.4	3	12
3	5	(Germany) Herbert Rittberger	Kreidler	9	+21.3	8	10
4	2	(Italy) Eugenio Lazzarini	Kreidler			2	8
5	28	(Netherlands) Theo van Geffen	Kreidler				6
6	4	(Germany) Rudolf Kunz	Kreidler			5	5
7	34	(Netherlands) Gerrit Strikker	Kreidler			10	4
8	31	(Netherlands) Engelbert Kip	Kreidler				3
9	16	(Germany) Günter Schirnhöfer	Kreidler				2
10	11	(Italy) Aldo Pero	Kreidler				1
11	10	(Netherlands) Theo Timmer	Kreidler				
12	32	(Netherlands) Ton Kooyman	Hemeyla				
13	15	(Germany) Ingo Emmerich	Kreidler				
14	6	(Switzerland) Stefan Dörflinger	Kreidler			4	
15	3	(Belgium) Julien van Zeebroeck	Kreidler				
16	17	(Spain) Joaquin Gali	Derbi				
17	33	(Netherlands) Peter Looyesteyn	Kreidler				
18	23	(France) Yves le Tourmelin	Scrab-Tyl				
19	14	(Spain) Ramon Gali	Derbi				
20	21	(Belgium) Guido de Lys	Kreidler				
21	29	(Netherlands) Wim van Beek	DRM				
22	26	(United Kingdom) Terence Keane	Kreidler				
Ret		(Austria) Hans Hummel	Kreidler			6	
Ret		(United Kingdom) Bruce Brady	Kreidler			7	
Ret		(Netherlands) Nico Polane	Kreidler			9	
30 starters in total

== Sidecar classification ==
Pos	No.	Rider	Passenger	Manufacturer	Laps	Time	Grid	Points
1	7	(Switzerland) Hermann Schmid	(Switzerland) Jean-Pierre Martial	Yamaha	14	48:35.8	3	15
2	24	(Netherlands) Martin Kooy	(Netherlands) Rob Vader	König	14	+2.1	9	12
3	8	(Germany) Gustav Pape	(Germany) Franz Kallenberg	König	14	+36.7	10	10
4	2	(Germany) Werner Schwärzel	(Germany) Andreas Huber	König			2	8
5	11	(Germany) Helmut Schilling	(Germany) Rainer Gundel	Aro			8	6
6	10	(Germany) Otto Haller	(Germany) Erich Haselbeck	BMW				5
7	15	(United Kingdom) Dick Greasley	(United Kingdom) Cliff Holland	Yamaha				4
8	1	(Germany) Rolf Steinhausen	(Germany) Sepp Huber	Busch-König			5	3
9	25	(Netherlands) Jaap Geerts	(Netherlands) Jan van Veen	König				2
10	19	(Germany) Siegfried Schauzu	(Germany) Wolfgang Kalauch	Aro			4	1
11	9	(Italy) Amedeo Zini	(Italy) Andrea Fornaro	König				
Ret		(Switzerland) Rolf Biland	(United Kingdom) Ken Williams	Yamaha			1	
Ret		(Netherlands) Cees Smit	(Netherlands) Jan Smit	König			6	
Ret		(France) Alain Michel	(France) Bernard Garcia	Yamaha			7	
18 starters in total

Previous race: 1976 Isle of Man TT	FIM Grand Prix World Championship; 1976 season	Next race: 1976 Belgian Grand Prix
Previous race: 1975 Dutch TT	Dutch TT	Next race: 1977 Dutch TT
