= 1976 Spanish motorcycle Grand Prix =

(Spain) 1976 Spanish Grand Prix
Race details
- Race 12 of 12 races in the 1976 Grand Prix motorcycle racing season
- Date: 19 September 1976
- Official name: Gran Premio de España
- Location: Circuito del Montjuïc
- Course: Public roads; 3.791 km (2.356 mi)

350cc
Pole position
Rider	(Italy) Walter Villa	Harley-Davidson
Time	1:42.41	
Fastest lap
Rider	(Italy) Franco Uncini	Yamaha
Time	1:42.3	
Podium
First	(South Africa) Kork Ballington	Yamaha
Second	(Spain) Víctor Palomo	Yamaha
Third	(Italy) Franco Uncini	Yamaha

250cc
Pole position
Rider	(South Africa) Alan North	Yamaha
Time	1:46.13	
Fastest lap
Rider	(Italy) Walter Villa	Harley-Davidson
Time	1:43.0	
Podium
First	(Italy) Gianfranco Bonera	Harley Davidson
Second	(Italy) Walter Villa	Harley Davidson
Third	(South Africa) Alan North	Yamaha

125cc
Pole position
Rider	(Spain) Ángel Nieto	Bultaco
Time	1:49.81	
Fastest lap
Rider	(Italy) Pierpaolo Bianchi	Morbidelli
Time	1:48.8	
Podium
First	(Italy) Pierpaolo Bianchi	Morbidelli
Second	(Spain) Ángel Nieto	Bultaco
Third	(Netherlands) Henk van Kessel	AGV Condor

50cc
Pole position
Rider	(Spain) Ángel Nieto	Bultaco
Time	1:57.27	
Fastest lap
Rider	(Spain) Ángel Nieto	Bultaco
Time	1:57.0	
Podium
First	(Spain) Ángel Nieto	Bultaco
Second	(Germany) Herbert Rittberger	Kreidler
Third	(Italy) Eugenio Lazzarini	Kreidler

The 1976 Spanish motorcycle Grand Prix was the twelfth and final round of the 1976 Grand Prix motorcycle racing season. It took place on 19 September 1976 at the Circuito del Montjuïc.

== 350 cc classification ==
Pos	No.	Rider	Manufacturer	Laps	Time	Grid	Points
1	7	(South Africa) Kork Ballington	Yamaha	30	52:17.43	10	15
2	8	(Spain) Víctor Palomo	Yamaha	30	+1.71	4	12
3	23	(Italy) Franco Uncini	Yamaha	30	+2.53	2	10
4	1	(Venezuela) Johnny Cecotto	Yamaha	30	+19.78	3	8
5	15	(Switzerland) Bruno Kneubühler	Yamaha	30	+23.42	8	6
6	9	(Italy) Walter Villa	Harley-Davidson	30	+36.63	1	5
7	10	(South Africa) Alan North	Yamaha	30	+54.50	6	4
8	39	(Netherlands) Boet van Dulmen	Yamaha	30	+54.64	11	3
9	4	(United Kingdom) Tom Herron	Yamaha	30	+1:35.95	16	2
10	5	(France) Olivier Chevallier	Yamaha	30	+1:37.39	14	1
11	25	(Switzerland) Roland Freymond	Yamaha	29	+1 lap	17	
12	32	(West Germany) Anton Mang	Yamaha	29	+1 lap		
13	27	(Venezuela) Rogelio Cardozo	Yamaha	29	+1 lap	20	
14	30	(United Kingdom) George Fogarty	Yamaha	29	+1 lap		
15	28	(Finland) Markku Matikainen	Yamaha	29	+1 lap		
16	18	(West Germany) Bernd Tügenthal	Yamaha	29	+1 lap		
17	24	(Italy) Francini Vanes	Yamaha	29	+1 lap		
18	17	(Switzerland) Franz Meier	Yamaha	29	+1 lap	18	
19	22	(Brazil) Edmar Ferreira	Yamaha	28	+2 laps		
Ret		(United Kingdom) Chas Mortimer	Yamaha			5	
Ret		(France) Patrick Fernandez	Yamaha			7	
Ret		(Finland) Pentti Korhonen	Yamaha			9	
Ret		(Italy) Gianfranco Bonera	Harley-Davidson			12	
Ret		(Spain) Jaime Samaranch	Yamaha			13	
Ret		(Switzerland) Franz Kunz	Yamaha			15	
Ret		(Australia) John Dodds	Yamaha			19	
29 starters in total

== 250 cc classification ==
Pos	No.	Rider	Manufacturer	Laps	Time	Grid	Points
1	16	(Italy) Gianfranco Bonera	Harley-Davidson	30	53:25.99	2	15
2	1	(Italy) Walter Villa	Harley-Davidson	30	+0.19	4	12
3	32	(South Africa) Alan North	Yamaha	30	+14.52	1	10
4	31	(Finland) Pentti Korhonen	Yamaha	13	+17.04	6	8
5	9	(Spain) Víctor Palomo	Yamaha	30	+25.50	5	6
6	24	(Italy) Franco Uncini	Yamaha	30	+40.98	3	5
7	44	(Netherlands) Boet van Dulmen	Yamaha	30	+46.56	9	4
8	22	(South Africa) Kork Ballington	Yamaha	30	+1:06.52	10	3
9	15	(France) Patrick Fernandez	Yamaha	30	+1:06.68	8	2
10	14	(Netherlands) Henk van Kessel	Yamaha	30	+1:12.89	14	1
11	7	(Switzerland) Bruno Kneubühler	Yamaha	30	+1:14.73	7	
12	43	(United Kingdom) Chas Mortimer	Yamaha	30	+1:22.09	11	
13	3	(United Kingdom) Tom Herron	Yamaha	30	+1:39.40	15	
14	18	(Australia) John Dodds	Yamaha	30	+1:45.19		
15	12	(Italy) Pierpaolo Bianchi	Morbidelli	30	+1:59.18	16	
16	35	(Switzerland) Franz Kunz	Yamaha	29	+1 lap		
17	10	(Austria) Harald Bartol	Yamaha	29	+1 lap		
18	30	(Venezuela) Rogelio Cardozo	Yamaha	29	+1 lap	19	
19	2	(West Germany) Bernd Tügenthal	Yamaha	29	+1 lap		
20	19	(Switzerland) Franz Meier	Yamaha	28	+2 laps		
21	27	(Spain) Juan Bardons	Yamaha	28	+2 laps		
22	33	(Switzerland) Hans Stadelmann	Yamaha	28	+2 laps		
Ret		(France) Olivier Chevallier	Yamaha			12	
Ret		(Spain) Jaime Samaranch	Yamaha			13	
Ret		(Spain) Mauricio Aschl	Yamaha			17	
Ret		(Italy) Pierluigi Conforti	Morbidelli			18	
Ret		(Sweden) Leif Gustafsson	Yamaha			20	
28 starters in total

== 125 cc classification ==
Pos	No.	Rider	Manufacturer	Laps	Time	Grid	Points
1	2	(Italy) Pierpaolo Bianchi	Morbidelli	27	49:56.04	2	15
2	4	(Spain) Ángel Nieto	Bultaco	27	+25.54	1	12
3	5	(Netherlands) Henk van Kessel	AGV Condor	27	+1:03.20	4	10
4	26	(West Germany) Anton Mang	Morbidelli	27	+1:03.82	6	8
5	35	(France) Jean-Louis Guignabodet	Morbidelli	26	+1 lap	7	6
6	18	(Belgium) Julien van Zeebroeck	Morbidelli	26	+1 lap	8	5
7	8	(Italy) Pierluigi Conforti	Morbidelli	26	+1 lap	13	4
8	3	(Italy) Eugenio Lazzarini	Morbidelli	26	+1 lap	11	3
9	16	(Italy) Ermanno Giuliano	LGM-Daspa	26	+1 lap	15	2
10	15	(Netherlands) Cees van Dongen	Morbidelli	26	+1 lap	16	1
11	9	(Switzerland) Hans Müller	Yamaha	25	+2 laps	17	
12	17	(Switzerland) Ulrich Graf	Yamaha	25	+2 laps	20	
13	36	(Italy) Enrico Cereda	Morbidelli	25	+2 laps		
14	25	(Finland) Pentti Salonen	Yamaha	24	+3 laps		
Ret		(Italy) Claudio Lusuardi	Bridgestone			3	
Ret		(West Germany) Gert Bender	Bender			5	
Ret		(Austria) Harald Bartol	Morbidelli			9	
Ret		(West Germany) Peter Frohnmeyer	DRS			10	
Ret		(France) Patrick Plisson	Morbidelli			12	
Ret		(Sweden) Per-Edward Carlson	Morbidelli			14	
Ret		(Switzerland) Ernst Stammbach	Malanca			18	
Ret		(Switzerland) Rolf Blatter	Maico			19	
27 starters in total

== 50 cc classification ==
Pos	No.	Rider	Manufacturer	Laps	Time	Grid	Points
1	1	(Spain) Ángel Nieto	Bultaco	17	34:01.51	1	15
2	5	(West Germany) Herbert Rittberger	Kreidler	17	+12.97	2	12
3	2	(Italy) Eugenio Lazzarini	Kreidler	17	+28.49	4	10
4	16	(Switzerland) Rolf Blatter	Kreidler	17	+40.93	5	8
5	3	(Belgium) Julien van Zeebroeck	Kreidler	17	+56.72		6
6	37	(Spain) Ricardo Tormo	Kreidler	17	+57.26	9	5
7	10	(Italy) Claudio Lusuardi	Villa	17	+58.75	11	4
8	19	(West Germany) Günter Schirnhofer	Kreidler	17	+1:19.38	7	3
9	11	(Italy) Aldo Pero	Kreidler	17	+1:26.09	15	2
10	9	(Austria) Hans Hummel	Kreidler	17	+1:39.58	14	1
11	29	(Spain) Joaquin Gali	Derbi	17	+2:07.02	16	
12	15	(Spain) Ramon Gali	Derbi	16	+1 lap	19	
13	32	(France) Arthur Benitah	Scrab	16	+1 lap	20	
14	27	(Spain) Jorge Navarrete	Derbi	16	+1 lap		
15	31	(Switzerland) Ernst Stammbach	Kreidler	16	+1 lap		
16	30	(Finland) Kai Lindstrom	Tunturi-Puch	15	+2 laps		
17	38	(Switzerland) Hans Hofer	Hosta	14	+3 laps		
18	36	(Netherlands) Engelbert Kip	Kreidler	13	+4 laps	13	
19	22	(Spain) Javier Mira	Derbi	11	+6 laps		
Ret		(Switzerland) Ulrich Graf	Kreidler			3	
Ret		(Italy) Ermanno Giuliano	LGM Daspa			6	
Ret		(Netherlands) Theo Timmer	Kreidler			8	
Ret		(Netherlands) Nico Polane	Kreidler			10	
Ret		(Netherlands) Cees van Dongen	Kreidler			12	
Ret		(Belgium) Patrick de Wulf	Kreidler			17	
Ret		(France) Benjamin Laurent	Kreidler			18	
29 starters in total

Previous race: 1976 German Grand Prix	FIM Grand Prix World Championship; 1976 season	Next race: 1977 Venezuelan Grand Prix
Previous race: 1975 Spanish Grand Prix	Spanish Grand Prix	Next race: 1977 Spanish Grand Prix
