= 1976 Yugoslavian motorcycle Grand Prix =

(Socialist Federal Republic of Yugoslavia) 1976 Yugoslavian Grand Prix
Race details
- Race 4 of 12 races in the 1976 Grand Prix motorcycle racing season
- Date: 23 May 1976
- Official name: Grand Prix de Yougoslavie
- Location: Circuit d'Opatija
- Course: Permanent racing facility; 6.000 km (3.728 mi)

350cc
Pole position
Rider	(United Kingdom) Tom Herron	Yamaha
Time	2:17.9	
Fastest lap
Rider	(France) Olivier Chevallier	Yamaha
Time	2:16.3	
Podium
First	(France) Olivier Chevallier	Yamaha
Second	(United Kingdom) Chas Mortimer	Yamaha
Third	(Japan) Takazumi Katayama	Yamaha

250cc
Pole position
Rider	(Japan) Takazumi Katayama	Yamaha
Time	2:20.9	
Fastest lap
Rider	(Italy) Gianfranco Bonera	Harley-Davidson
Time	2:20.2	
Podium
First	(Germany) Dieter Braun	Yamaha
Second	(United Kingdom) Tom Herron	Yamaha
Third	(France) Olivier Chevallier	Yamaha

125cc
Pole position
Rider	(Spain) Ángel Nieto	Bultaco
Time	2:27.4	
Fastest lap
Rider	(Spain) Ángel Nieto	Bultaco
Time	2:25.7	
Podium
First	(Italy) Pierpaolo Bianchi	Morbidelli
Second	(Netherlands) Henk van Kessel	Yamaha
Third	(Italy) Paolo Pileri	Morbidelli

50cc
Pole position
Rider	(Spain) Ángel Nieto	Bultaco
Time	2:43.5	
Fastest lap
Rider	(Germany) Herbert Rittberger	Kreidler
Time	2:44.8	
Podium
First	(Switzerland) Ulrich Graf	Kreidler
Second	(Germany) Herbert Rittberger	Kreidler
Third	(Spain) Ángel Nieto	Bultaco

The 1976 Yugoslavian motorcycle Grand Prix was the fourth round of the 1976 Grand Prix motorcycle racing season. It took place on 23 May 1976 at the Opatija circuit.

== 350 cc classification ==
Pos	No.	Rider	Manufacturer	Laps	Time	Grid	Points
1	43	(France) Olivier Chevallier	Yamaha	25	57:52.4	4	15
2	6	(United Kingdom) Chas Mortimer	Yamaha	25	+10.6	7	12
3	28	(Japan) Takazumi Katayama	Yamaha	25	+17.0	5	10
4	17	(Switzerland) Bruno Kneubühler	Yamaha	25	+1:23.4	15	8
5	9	(United Kingdom) Tom Herron	Yamaha	25	+1:56.0	1	6
6	7	(France) Gérard Choukroun	Yamaha	25	+2:25.7		5
7	5	(France) Patrick Pons	Yamaha	25	+2:27.2	8	4
8	20	(Norway) Kjell Solberg	Yamaha	24	+1 lap		3
9	35	(Sweden) Bo Granath	Yamaha	24	+1 lap		2
10	41	(Italy) Claudio Loigo	Yamaha	24	+1 lap		1
11	51	(Australia) Victor Soussan	Yamaha	24	+1 lap		
12	24	(Czechoslovakia) Peter Baláž	Yamaha	21	+4 laps	13	
Ret		(Italy) Giacomo Agostini	MV Agusta			2	
Ret		(Germany) Dieter Braun	Yamaha			3	
Ret		(Italy) Walter Villa	Harley-Davidson			6	
Ret		(Finland) Pentti Korhonen	Yamaha			9	
Ret		(Australia) John Dodds	Yamaha			10	
Ret		(Venezuela) Johnny Cecotto	Yamaha			11	
Ret		(Sweden) Leif Gustafsson	Yamaha			12	
Ret		(Hungary) János Drapál	Yamaha			14	
Ret		(Finland) Pekka Nurmi	Yamaha			16	
Ret		(Switzerland) Franz Kunz	Yamaha			17	
Ret		(France) Patrick Fernandez	Yamaha			18	
Ret		(Switzerland) Philippe Coulon	Yamaha			19	
Ret		(Denmark) Børge Nielsen	Yamaha			20	
30 starters in total

== 250 cc classification ==
Pos	No.	Rider	Manufacturer	Laps	Time	Grid	Points
1	3	(Germany) Dieter Braun	Yamaha	21	50:19.8	10	15
2	14	(United Kingdom) Tom Herron	Yamaha	21	+6.7	2	12
3	45	(France) Olivier Chevallier	Yamaha	21	+7.0	12	10
4	51	(France) Patrick Fernandez	Yamaha	21	+14.9	4	8
5	6	(United Kingdom) Chas Mortimer	Yamaha	21	+16.9	6	6
6	9	(Switzerland) Bruno Kneubühler	MZ	21	+28.2	11	5
7	31	(Italy) Gianfranco Bonera	Harley-Davidson	21	+29.7	3	4
8	16	(Finland) Pentti Korhonen	Yamaha	21	+35.0	7	3
9	25	(Hungary) János Drapál	Yamaha	21	+37.3	13	2
10	5	(France) Patrick Pons	Yamaha	21	+1:00.0	8	1
11	55	(Finland) Eero Hyvarinen	Yamaha	21	+1:13.6		
12	35	(Netherlands) Henk van Kessel	Yamaha	21	+1:34.5	19	
13	53	(France) Philippe Bouzanne	Yamaha	21	+1:35.3	18	
14	29	(Czechoslovakia) Peter Baláž	Jawa	21	+1:41.3		
15	23	(Denmark) Børge Nielsen	Yamaha	21	+2:17.0		
16	56	(Finland) Pentti Salonen	Yamaha	20	+1 lap		
17	44	(Australia) Victor Soussan	Yamaha	20	+1 lap		
18	15	(Switzerland) Hans Müller	Yamaha	20	+1 lap		
19	24	(Norway) Kjell Solberg	Yamaha	20	+1 lap		
20	40	(Sweden) Bo Granath	Yamaha	20	+1 lap		
21	46	(Japan) Tatemo Chujero	Yamaha	20	+1 lap	14	
Ret		(Japan) Takazumi Katayama	Yamaha			1	
Ret		(Italy) Walter Villa	Harley-Davidson			5	
Ret		(Italy) Mario Lega	Yamaha			9	
Ret		(Sweden) Leif Gustafsson	Yamaha			15	
Ret		(Finland) Pekka Nurmi	Yamaha			16	
Ret		(Spain) Jaime Samaranch	Yamaha			17	
Ret		(France) Gérard Choukroun	Yamaha			20	
30 starters in total

== 125 cc classification ==
Pos	No.	Rider	Manufacturer	Laps	Time	Grid	Points
1	2	(Italy) Pierpaolo Bianchi	Morbidelli	19	47:23.1	2	15
2	5	(Netherlands) Henk van Kessel	Yamaha	19	+7.9	4	12
3	1	(Italy) Paolo Pileri	Morbidelli	19	+11.2	3	10
4	11	(Switzerland) Stefan Dörflinger	Morbidelli	19	+2:38.3	6	8
5	44	(Switzerland) Xaver Tschannen	Maico	18	+1 lap	8	6
6	8	(Netherlands) Cees van Dongen	Morbidelli	18	+1 lap	11	5
7	42	(Switzerland) Rolf Blatter	Maico	18	+1 lap	15	4
8	4	(Italy) Eugenio Lazzarini	Morbidelli	18	+1 lap	7	3
9	7	(Switzerland) Hans Müller	Yamaha	18	+1 lap	9	2
10	9	(Germany) Peter Frohnmeyer	Nava DRS	18	+1 lap	16	1
11	33	(Socialist Federal Republic of Yugoslavia) Boris Bajc	Yamaha	17	+2 laps	18	
12	18	(Czechoslovakia) Fendrich Bedrich	Ravo	17	+2 laps	17	
13	21	(Hungary) Peter Szabo	MZ	17	+2 laps		
Ret		(Spain) Ángel Nieto	Bultaco			1	
Ret		(Poland) Edward Stachowski	Yamaha			5	
Ret		(Finland) Pentti Salonen	Yamaha			10	
Ret		(Italy) Germano Zanetti	Morbidelli			12	
Ret		(Finland) Matti Kinnunen	Maico			13	
Ret		(Hungary) Janos Reisz	Yamaha			14	
Ret		(Socialist Federal Republic of Yugoslavia) Gabel Karel	Yamaha			19	
Ret		(Italy) Aldo Pero	Morbidelli			20	
25 starters in total

== 50 cc classification ==
Pos	No.	Rider	Manufacturer	Laps	Time	Grid	Points
1	11	(Switzerland) Ulrich Graf	Kreidler	15	42:09.0	2	15
2	5	(Germany) Herbert Rittberger	Kreidler	15	+7.0	3	12
3	1	(Spain) Ángel Nieto	Bultaco	15	+21.4	1	10
4	6	(Switzerland) Stefan Dörflinger	Kreidler	15	+21.9	4	8
5	4	(Germany) Rudolf Kunz	Kreidler	15	+1:09.1	7	6
6	39	(France) Pierre Audry	Kreidler	15	+1:30.0	8	5
7	38	(Italy) Aldo Pero	Morbidelli	15	+2:06.3	12	4
8	14	(Netherlands) Cees van Dongen	Kreidler	15	+2:27.4	10	3
9	41	(Switzerland) Rolf Blatter	Kreidler	15	+3:02.7	11	2
10	18	(Germany) Günter Schirnhöfer	Kreidler	14	+1 lap	15	1
11	24	(Czechoslovakia) Havrda Zbynek	Kreidler	14	+1 lap	16	
12	26	(Czechoslovakia) Fendrich Bedrich	Kreidler	14	+1 lap	19	
13	37	(Socialist Federal Republic of Yugoslavia) Nevio Paliska	Tomos	13	+2 laps		
14	30	(Sweden) Robert Laver	Kreidler	12	+3 laps	20	
15	32	(Socialist Federal Republic of Yugoslavia) Boris Bajc	Kreidler	12	+3 laps	14	
16	33	(Socialist Federal Republic of Yugoslavia) Boris Maruza	Kreidler	12	+3 laps		
17	34	(Socialist Federal Republic of Yugoslavia) Vilko Sever	Kreidler	12	+3 laps		
Ret		(Italy) Eugenio Lazzarini	UFO			5	
Ret		(Italy) Claudio Lusuardi	Villa			6	
Ret		(Belgium) Julien van Zeebroeck	Kreidler			9	
Ret		(Austria) Hans Hummel	Kreidler			13	
Ret		(Belgium) Patrick de Wulf	Kreidler			17	
Ret		(Belgium) Guido de Lys	Kreidler			18	
27 starters in total

Previous race: 1976 Nations Grand Prix	FIM Grand Prix World Championship; 1976 season	Next race: 1976 Isle of Man TT
Previous race: 1975 Yugoslavian Grand Prix	Yugoslavian Grand Prix	Next race: 1977 Yugoslavian Grand Prix
