= 1977 Yugoslavian motorcycle Grand Prix =

(Socialist Federal Republic of Yugoslavia) 1977 Yugoslavian Grand Prix
Race details
- Race 7 of 13 races in the 1977 Grand Prix motorcycle racing season
- Date: 19 June 1977
- Official name: Velika Nagrada Jugoslavije/Grand Prix de Yougoslavie
- Location: Circuit d'Opatija
- Course: Permanent racing facility; 6.000 km (3.728 mi)

350cc
Pole position
Rider	(Australia) John Dodds	Yamaha
Time	2:16.5	
Fastest lap
Rider	(Japan) Takazumi Katayama	Yamaha
Time	2:13.7	
Podium
First	(Japan) Takazumi Katayama	Yamaha
Second	(South Africa) Jon Ekerold	Yamaha
Third	(France) Michel Rougerie	Yamaha

250cc
Pole position
Rider	(France) Michel Rougerie	Yamaha
Time	2:20.7	
Fastest lap
Rider	(Italy) Mario Lega	Morbidelli
Time	2:19.2	
Podium
First	(Italy) Mario Lega	Morbidelli
Second	(Japan) Takazumi Katayama	Yamaha
Third	(United Kingdom) Tom Herron	Yamaha

125cc
Pole position
Rider	(Italy) Pierpaolo Bianchi	Morbidelli
Time	2:24.0	
Fastest lap
Rider	(Italy) Pierpaolo Bianchi	Morbidelli
Time	2:25.4	
Podium
First	(Italy) Pierpaolo Bianchi	Morbidelli
Second	(Spain) Ángel Nieto	Bultaco
Third	(Italy) Maurizio Massimiani	Morbidelli

50cc
Pole position
Rider	(Spain) Ángel Nieto	Bultaco
Time	2:40.1	
Fastest lap
Rider	(Spain) Ángel Nieto	Bultaco
Time	2:41.1	
Podium
First	(Spain) Ángel Nieto	Bultaco
Second	(Spain) Ricardo Tormo	Bultaco
Third	(France) Patrick Plisson	ABF

The 1977 Yugoslavian motorcycle Grand Prix was the seventh round of the FIM 1977 Grand Prix motorcycle racing season. It took place on 19 June 1977 at the Opatija Circuit. The event was marred by two fatalities, and this turned out to be the last Yugoslavian motorcycle Grand Prix at Opatija. The event moved to the further inland Rijeka Circuit.

== Race summary ==
The event took place under heavy rumors of it being cancelled because of the existing safety conditions of the seaside Opatija street circuit. The Yugoslavian Grand Prix promoters had received an ultimatum from the FIM before the race that, if they did not improve the safety of the circuit, the event would be canceled. Despite the circuit's scenic setting, it was an unsafe race track due to high speeds on narrow roads coupled with numerous unmovable roadside obstacles, such as trees, stone walls, lampposts, electric poles, embankments, houses, and the Adriatic Sea.

The safety conditions at the Opatija Circuit had previously been protested by competitors in 1973 when, in the aftermath of the deaths of Jarno Saarinen and Renzo Pasolini at the Monza round, several racing teams including Yamaha, Harley Davidson and MV Agusta, boycotted the event due to unsafe track conditions. Other riders chose to compete, but with less than their full efforts. In the 1974 Yugoslavian Grand Prix, British rider Billie Nelson crashed into the crowd during the 250cc race, injuring several spectators. Nelson died later that night at a hospital.

The 1977 Grand Prix turned into a disaster when Italian rider, Giovanni Ziggiotto, crashed during practice for the 250cc race when his motorcycle's engine seized and he was hit from behind by Per-Edward Carlson. He died four days later in a hospital. During the 50 cc race, Ulrich Graf crashed when his bike developed a rear tire puncture and he was thrown into a rock wall. He suffered serious head injuries and died later in a hospital. The tragedy forced the venue off the Grand Prix schedule and the Yugoslavian Grand Prix was moved to the Rijeka Circuit for the 1978 season.

== 350 cc classification ==
Pos	No.	Rider	Manufacturer	Laps	Time	Grid	Points
1	8	(Japan) Takazumi Katayama	Yamaha	25	56:53.0	11	15
2	50	(South Africa) Jon Ekerold	Yamaha	25	+35.2	10	12
3	26	(France) Michel Rougerie	Yamaha	25	+1:09.7	3	10
4	4	(United Kingdom) Tom Herron	Yamaha	25	+1:16.9	4	8
5	5	(Australia) John Dodds	Yamaha	25	+1:19.8	1	6
6	9	(France) Olivier Chevallier	Yamaha	25	+1:43.3	8	5
7	19	(France) Patrick Fernandez	Yamaha	25	+1:50.6	6	4
8	36	(Finland) Pekka Nurmi	Yamaha	25	+1:57.8	13	3
9	56	(France) Jean-Claude Hogrel	Yamaha	24	+1 lap		2
10	33	(Germany) Helmut Kassner	Yamaha	24	+1 lap	20	1
		(Italy) Mario Lega	Morbidelli			2	
		(Italy) Giacomo Agostini	Yamaha			5	
		(Hungary) János Drapál	Yamaha			7	
		(France) Patrick Pons	Yamaha			9	
		(Sweden) Leif Gustafsson	Yamaha			12	
		(Finland) Pentti Korhonen	Yamaha			14	
		(South Africa) Kork Ballington	Yamaha			15	
		(France) Christian Sarron	Yamaha			16	
		(Italy) Giovanni Pelletier	Yamaha			17	
		(Austria) Karl Auer	Yamaha			18	
		(Finland) Eero Hyvärinen	Yamaha			19	
28 starters in total

== 250 cc classification ==
Pos	No.	Rider	Manufacturer	Laps	Time	Grid	Points
1	21	(Italy) Mario Lega	Morbidelli	21	49:19.4	5	15
2	2	(Japan) Takazumi Katayama	Yamaha	21	+6.2	2	12
3	5	(United Kingdom) Tom Herron	Yamaha	21	+41.2	6	10
4	29	(Australia) John Dodds	Yamaha	21	+48.3	10	8
5	51	(Italy) Pierluigi Conforti	Yamaha	21	+51.4	4	6
6	36	(France) Patrick Fernandez	Yamaha	21	+1:02.2	13	5
7	4	(Finland) Pentti Korhonen	Yamaha	21	+1:06.0		4
8	54	(South Africa) Jon Ekerold	Yamaha	21	+1:10.2		3
9	16	(Finland) Pekka Nurmi	Yamaha	21	+1:27.0	14	2
10	15	(France) Patrick Pons	Yamaha	21	+1:44.7	12	1
11	37	(France) Christian Sarron	Yamaha	21	+1:45.7	7	
12	57	(Italy) Gianni Pelletier	Yamaha	21	+1:46.1		
13	19	(Switzerland) Hans Müller	Yamaha	21	+2:05.8	18	
14	42	(Germany) Anton Mang	Yamaha	21	+2:09.2		
15	12	(Sweden) Leif Gustafsson	Yamaha	20	+1 lap	8	
16	49	(Venezuela) Jose Cecotto	Yamaha	20	+1 lap		
17	47	(Italy) Sauro Pazzaglia	Yamaha	20	+1 lap		
18	62	(Italy) Giuseppe Consalvi	Yamaha	20	+1 lap		
		(France) Michel Rougerie	Yamaha			1	
		(Italy) Paolo Pileri	Morbidelli			3	
		(Italy) Walter Villa	Harley-Davidson			9	
		(France) Guy Bertin	Yamaha			11	
		(United Kingdom) Barry Ditchburn	Kawasaki			15	
		(Japan) Masahiro Wada	Kawasaki			16	
		(France) Olivier Chevallier	Yamaha			17	
		(Finland) Eero Hyvärinen	Yamaha			19	
		(South Africa) Kork Ballington	Yamaha			20	
30 starters in total

== 125 cc classification ==
Pos	No.	Rider	Manufacturer	Laps	Time	Grid	Points
1	1	(Italy) Pierpaolo Bianchi	Morbidelli	19	46:25.4	1	15
2	2	(Spain) Ángel Nieto	Bultaco	19	+1:13.9	3	12
3	50	(Italy) Maurizio Massimiani	Morbidelli	19	+1:37.4	12	10
4	6	(France) Jean-Louis Guignabodet	Morbidelli	19	+1:52.8	9	8
5	51	(Italy) Ermanno Giuliano	Morbidelli	19	+2:08.9	7	6
6	15	(Finland) Matti Kinnunen	Morbidelli	19	+2:16.1	8	5
7	5	(Germany) Anton Mang	Morbidelli	19	+2:28.2	19	4
8	46	(Netherlands) Cees van Dongen	Morbidelli	18	+1 lap		3
9	42	(Italy) Claudio Lusuardi	Lusuardi	17	+2 laps	13	2
10	10	(Belgium) Julien van Zeebroeck	Morbidelli	16	+3 laps		1
		(Italy) Eugenio Lazzarini	Morbidelli			2	
		(Austria) Harald Bartol	Morbidelli			4	
		(Italy) Pierluigi Conforti	Morbidelli			5	
		(Hungary) János Drapál	Morbidelli			6	
		(Switzerland) Stefan Dörflinger	Morbidelli			10	
		(Italy) Sauro Pazzaglia	Morbidelli			11	
		(Argentina) Guillermo Pérez	Yamaha			14	
		(Switzerland) Hans Müller	Morbidelli			15	
		(Italy) Germano Zanetti	Morbidelli			16	
		(France) Thierry Noblesse	Morbidelli			17	
		(Switzerland) Xaver Tschannen	Bender			18	
		(Italy) Luigi Rinaudo	Morbidelli			20	
28 starters in total

== 50 cc classification ==
Pos	No.	Rider	Manufacturer	Laps	Time	Grid	Points
1	1	(Spain) Ángel Nieto	Bultaco	15	40:47.6	1	15
2	20	(Spain) Ricardo Tormo	Bultaco	15	+4.6	4	12
3	50	(France) Patrick Plisson	ABF	15	+2:08.9	9	10
4	43	(Netherlands) Cees van Dongen	Kreidler	15	+1 lap	13	8
5	24	(France) Jean-Louis Guignabodet	Morbidelli	14	+1 lap	20	6
6	42	(Germany) Günter Schirnhofer	Kreidler	14	+1 lap		5
7	25	(Spain) Ramón Gali	Derbi	14	+1 lap	10	4
8	30	(Socialist Federal Republic of Yugoslavia) Adrijan Bernetic	Tomos	14	+1 lap		3
9	12	(Netherlands) Theo Timmer	Kreidler	14	+1 lap	17	2
10	9	(Austria) Hans Hummel	Kreidler	14	+1 lap	18	1
11	47	(Germany) Ingo Emmerich	Kreidler	14	+1 lap		
12	39	(Italy) Claudio Lusuardi	Bultaco	14	+1 lap	3	
13	39	(Austria) Otto Machinek	Kreidler	12	+3 laps	19	
14	14	(Italy) Aldo Pero	Kreidler	12	+3 laps	7	
15	35	(Socialist Federal Republic of Yugoslavia) Vilko Sever	Kreidler	11	+4 laps		
		(Italy) Eugenio Lazzarini	Morbidelli			2	
		(Germany) Herbert Rittberger	Kreidler			5	
Ret		(Switzerland) Ulrich Graf	Kreidler		Fatal accident	6	
		(Switzerland) Stefan Dörflinger	Kreidler			8	
		(Socialist Federal Republic of Yugoslavia) Boris Bajc	Kreidler			11	
		(Switzerland) Rudolf Kunz	Kreidler			12	
		(Socialist Federal Republic of Yugoslavia) Nevio Paliska	Tomos			14	
		(Netherlands) Engelbert Kip	Kreidler			15	
		(Germany) Wolfgang Müller	Kreidler			16	
30 starters in total

Previous race: 1977 French Grand Prix	FIM Grand Prix World Championship; 1977 season	Next race: 1977 Dutch TT
Previous race: 1976 Yugoslavian Grand Prix	Yugoslavian Grand Prix	Next race: 1978 Yugoslavian Grand Prix
