= 1976 Nations motorcycle Grand Prix =

(Italy) 1976 Nations Grand Prix
Race details
- Race 3 of 12 races in the 1976 Grand Prix motorcycle racing season
- Date: 16 May 1976
- Official name: Gran Premio delle Nazioni
- Location: Autodromo Internazionale del Mugello
- Course: Permanent racing facility; 5.245 km (3.259 mi)

500cc
Pole position
Rider	(Italy) Giacomo Agostini	Suzuki
Time	2:08.080	
Fastest lap
Rider	(United Kingdom) Barry Sheene (United Kingdom) Phil Read	Suzuki; Suzuki
Time	2:07.600	
Podium
First	(United Kingdom) Barry Sheene	Suzuki
Second	(United Kingdom) Phil Read	Suzuki
Third	(Italy) Virginio Ferrari	Suzuki

350cc
Pole position
Rider	(Australia) John Dodds	Yamaha
Time	2:10.670	
Fastest lap
Rider	(Venezuela) Johnny Cecotto	Yamaha
Time	2:10.600	
Podium
First	(Venezuela) Johnny Cecotto	Yamaha
Second	(Italy) Franco Uncini	Yamaha
Third	(Australia) John Dodds	Yamaha

250cc
Pole position
Rider	(Italy) Walter Villa	Harley-Davidson
Time	2:12.200	
Fastest lap
Rider	(Italy) Walter Villa	Harley-Davidson
Time	2:11.800	
Podium
First	(Italy) Walter Villa	Harley-Davidson
Second	(Japan) Takazumi Katayama	Yamaha
Third	(Finland) Pentti Korhonen	Yamaha

125cc
Pole position
Rider	(Italy) Pierpaolo Bianchi	Morbidelli
Time	2:18.640	
Fastest lap
Rider	(Italy) Otello Buscherini	Malanca
Time	2:18.300	
Podium
First	(Italy) Pierpaolo Bianchi	Morbidelli
Second	(Italy) Paolo Pileri	Morbidelli
Third	(Spain) Ángel Nieto	Bultaco

50cc
Pole position
Rider	(Spain) Ángel Nieto	Bultaco
Time	2:34.730	
Fastest lap
Rider	(Spain) Ángel Nieto	Bultaco
Time	2:32.200	
Podium
First	(Spain) Ángel Nieto	Bultaco
Second	(Italy) Eugenio Lazzarini	UFO
Third	(West Germany) Rudolf Kunz	Kreidler

The 1976 Nations motorcycle Grand Prix was the third round of the 1976 Grand Prix motorcycle racing season. It took place on 16 May 1976 at the Mugello circuit. Otello Buscherini suffered a fatal accident on lap 6 of the 250cc race and was killed.

== 500cc classification ==
Pos.	No.	Rider	Team	Manufacturer	Time/Retired	Points
1	7	(United Kingdom) Barry Sheene	Texaco Heron Team Suzuki	Suzuki	1:02'35.500	15
2	2	(United Kingdom) Phil Read	Team Life International	Suzuki	+0.100	12
3	28	(Italy) Virginio Ferrari	Gallina Corse	Suzuki	+53.000	10
4	4	(Finland) Teuvo Länsivuori	Life Racing Team	Suzuki	+53.500	8
5	54	(United States) Pat Hennen	Colemans	Suzuki	+1'39.300	6
6	27	(Netherlands) Marcel Ankoné	Nimag Suzuki	Suzuki	+1'45.300	5
7	32	(New Zealand) Stuart Avant	Colemans	Suzuki	+1'50.700	4
8	40	(Switzerland) Philippe Coulon		Suzuki	+1 lap	3
9	30	(West Germany) Dieter Braun		Suzuki	+1 lap	2
10	41	(Denmark) Børge Nielsen		Yamaha	+1 laps	1
11	57	(Austria) Max Wiener	Racing Team NO	Yamaha	+2 laps	
Ret	11	(Italy) Giacomo Agostini	Team API Marlboro	Suzuki	Retired	
Ret	10	(Australia) Jack Findlay	Jack Findlay Racing	Suzuki	Accident	
Ret	12	(Austria) Karl Auer	Racing Team NO	Yamaha	Retired	
Ret	20	(France) Michel Rougerie		Suzuki	Accident	
Ret	25	(France) Gilles Husson		Yamaha	Retired	
Ret	29	(Italy) Mario Necchi		Suzuki	Retired	
Ret	3	(United Kingdom) John Newbold	Texaco Heron Team Suzuki	Suzuki	Retired	
Ret	31	(Italy) Germano Paganini		Suzuki	Retired	
Ret	37	(Italy) Vanes Francini		Yamaha	Retired	
Ret	36	(Italy) Giorgio Avveduti		Suzuki	Retired	
Ret	37	(Italy) Vanes Francini		Yamaha	Retired	
Ret	33	(Spain) Víctor Palomo	Swaep Motor Racing	Yamaha	Retired	
Ret	49	(Italy) Nico Cereghini	Life Racing Team	Suzuki	Retired	
Ret	51	(Netherlands) Boet van Dulmen	Laponder Racing	Yamaha	Retired	
Ret	55	(Venezuela) Johnny Cecotto	Team Venemotos	Yamaha	Retired	
Ret	??	(Italy) Mario Fiorentino		Suzuki	Retired	
Ret	??	(Italy) Vittorio Gornati		Suzuki	Retired	
Ret	??	(Italy) Carlo Piazza		Suzuki	Retired	
Ret	??	(Australia) Victor Soussan		Yamaha	Retired	
Ret	44	(Brazil) Edmar Ferreira	Goias Swaep Motor	Yamaha	Retired	
DNS	44	(Italy) Eduardo Elias		Harley-Davidson	Did not start	

== 350 cc classification ==
Pos	No.	Rider	Manufacturer	Laps	Time	Grid	Points
1	1	(Venezuela) Johnny Cecotto	Yamaha	25	55:01.8	8	15
2	14	(Italy) Franco Uncini	Yamaha	25	+30.5	3	12
3	65	(Australia) John Dodds	Yamaha	25	+33.4	1	10
4	3	(Finland) Pentti Korhonen	Yamaha	25	+36.2	9	8
5	9	(United Kingdom) Tom Herron	Yamaha	25	+37.0	11	6
6	77	(South Africa) Kork Ballington	Yamaha	25	+37.5	17	5
7	73	(Italy) Walter Villa	Harley-Davidson	25	+37.7	2	4
8	76	(Netherlands) Boet van Dulmen	Yamaha	25	+1:00.6	19	3
9	23	(France) Philippe Bouzanne	Yamaha	25	+1:06.3	10	2
10	70	(Japan) Takazumi Katayama	Yamaha	25	+1:11.3		1
11	35	(Italy) Francini Vanes	Yamaha	25	+1:19.2		
12	24	(France) Jean-François Baldé	Yamaha	25	+1:21.2	13	
13	59	(South Africa) Alan North	Yamaha	25	+1:39.3		
14	21	(France) Christian Huguet	Yamaha	25	+2:10.3		
15	34	(Italy) Fosco Giansanti	Yamaha	24	+1 lap	12	
Ret	2	(Italy) Giacomo Agostini	MV Agusta			4	
Ret	49	(Italy) Paolo Tordi (Note: Tordi crashed on the second lap and died from chest injuries.)	Yamaha	1	Fatal accident	5	
Ret	5	(France) Patrick Pons	Yamaha			6	
Ret	11	(Spain) Víctor Palomo	Yamaha			7	
Ret	53	(Switzerland) Bruno Kneubühler	Yamaha			14	
Ret	43	(Italy) Giuseppe Consalvi	Yamaha			15	
Ret	55	(Italy) Eduardo Elias	Yamaha			16	
Ret	7	(France) Gérard Choukroun	Yamaha			18	
Ret		(United Kingdom) Chas Mortimer	Yamaha			20	
29 starters in total

Footnotes

== 250 cc classification ==
Pos	No.	Rider	Manufacturer	Laps	Time	Grid	Points
1	1	(Italy) Walter Villa	Harley-Davidson	23	51:43.3	1	15
2	25	(Japan) Takazumi Katayama	Yamaha	23	+21.8	13	12
3	19	(Finland) Pentti Korhonen	Yamaha	23	+37.9	3	10
4	6	(United Kingdom) Chas Mortimer	Yamaha	23	+1:00.1	10	8
5	48	(France) Jean-François Baldé	Yamaha	23	+1:01.4	9	6
6	9	(Switzerland) Bruno Kneubühler	Yamaha	23	+1:15.8		5
7	23	(United Kingdom) Tom Herron	Yamaha	23	+1:21.9		4
8	36	(France) Philippe Bouzanne	Yamaha	23	+1:28.3		3
9	11	(France) Olivier Chevallier	Yamaha	23	+1:40.9	16	2
10	66	(Finland) Eero Hyvarinen	Yamaha	23	+1:41.2		1
11	35	(Italy) Mario Lega	Yamaha	23	+1:44.1	15	
12	32	(France) Denis Boulom	Yamaha	23	+1:46.1	18	
13	45	(Switzerland) Hans Stadelmann	Yamaha	23	+1:59.7	2	
14	15	(France) Christian Sarron	Yamaha	22	+1 lap		
15	29	(Denmark) Erick Andersson	Yamaha	22	+1 lap		
16	52	(Italy) Alfio Micheli	Harley-Davidson	22	+1 lap		
17	50	(Austria) Rudolf Weiss	Yamaha	22	+1 lap		
Ret	5	(France) Patrick Pons	Yamaha			4	
Ret	37	(Italy) Paolo Pileri	Morbidelli			5	
Ret	3	(Italy) Virginio Ferrari	Harley-Davidson			6	
Ret	2	(France) Michel Rougerie	Yamaha			7	
Ret	28	(South Africa) Kork Ballington	Yamaha			8	
Ret	64	(Italy) Paolo Tordi	Yamaha			11	
Ret	8	(Sweden) Leif Gustafsson	Yamaha			12	
Ret	16	(Australia) John Dodds	Yamaha			14	
Ret	18	(France) Gérard Choukron	Yamaha			17	
Ret	7	(Italy) Otello Buscherini (Note: Buscherini crashed on the seventh lap and died from stomach injuries.)	Yamaha	6	Fatal accident	19	
Ret		(Italy) Gianfranco Bonera	Harley Davidson			20	
30 starters in total

Footnotes

== 125 cc classification ==
Pos	No.	Rider	Manufacturer	Laps	Time	Grid	Points
1	21	(Italy) Pierpaolo Bianchi	Morbidelli	20	46:54.2	1	15
2	22	(Italy) Paolo Pileri	Morbidelli	20	+24.7	2	12
3	12	(Spain) Ángel Nieto	Bultaco	20	+1:05.3	12	10
4	33	(Netherlands) Henk van Kessel	Condor	19	+1 lap	10	8
5	34	(Italy) Eugenio Lazzarini	Morbidelli	19	+1 lap	7	6
6	39	(Italy) Enrico Cereda	Morbidelli	19	+1 lap	11	5
7	23	(Italy) Luciano Richetti	Harley-Davidson	19	+1 lap	15	4
8	28	(Italy) Pierluigi Conforti	Yamaha Italjet	19	+1 lap	13	3
9	10	(Finland) Auno Hakala	Yamaha	19	+1 lap		2
10	18	(Finland) Matti Kinnunen	Maico	19	+1 lap		1
11	20	(Switzerland) Hans Müller	Yamaha	18	+2 laps		
Ret		(Italy) Otello Buscherini	Malanca			3	
Ret		(Switzerland) Xaver Tschannen	Maico			4	
Ret	36	(Italy) Ermanno Giuliano	Malanca			5	
Ret	6	(Switzerland) Stefan Dörflinger	Malanca			6	
Ret	7	(Austria) Harald Bartol	Morbidelli			8	
Ret	4	(Finland) Pentti Salonen	Yamaha			9	
Ret	8	(Germany) Peter Frohnmeyer	DRS			14	
30 starters in total

== 50 cc classification ==
Pos	No.	Rider	Manufacturer	Laps	Time	Grid	Points
1	1	(Spain) Ángel Nieto	Bultaco	12	30:49.9	1	15
2	2	(Italy) Eugenio Lazzarini	UFO	12	+24.9	2	12
3	4	(Germany) Rudolf Kunz	Kreidler	12	+32.8	4	10
4	14	(Switzerland) Ulrich Graf	Kreidler	12	+40.7	3	8
5	6	(Switzerland) Stefan Dörflinger	Kreidler	12	+56.9	5	6
6	23	(Switzerland) Rolf Blatter	Kreidler	12	+1:25.1		5
7	34	(Italy) Ezio Mischiati	Derbi MGM	12	+1:34.6		4
8	11	(Spain) Ramon Gali	Derbi	12	+1:38.5		3
9	42	(France) Pierre Audry	ABF	12	+1:39.5	6	2
10	12	(Italy) Aldo Pero	Kreidler	12	+1:43.9		1
11	16	(Netherlands) Cees van Dongen	Kreidler	12	+1:44.1		
12	8	(Germany) Wolfgang Müller	Kreidler	12	+1:45.0	10	
13	29	(Italy) Giovanni Ziggiotto	MTK	12	+1:45.1	7	
14	36	(Germany) Günter Schirnhöfer	Kreidler	12	+2:33.9	15	
15	41	(Belgium) Patrick de Wulf	Kreidler	11	+1 lap	9	
16	33	(Italy) Carlo Guerrini	Ringhini	11	+1 lap		
17	38	(Spain) Joaquin Gali	Derbi	11	+1 lap		
18	32	(Italy) Luigi Rinaudo	Tomos	11	+1 lap		
19	26	(Austria) Hans Kroismayer	Kreidler	11	+1 lap		
20	43	(Italy) Giorgio di Nunzio	Derbi	11	+1 lap		
Ret	7	(Netherlands) Nico Polane	Kreidler			8	
Ret	40	(Italy) Sergio Zattoni	Derbi			11	
Ret	10	(Italy) Claudio Lusuardi	Villa			12	
Ret	9	(Austria) Hans Hummel	Kreidler			13	
Ret	27	(Italy) Ermanno Giuliano	Kreidler			14	
29 starters in total

Previous race: 1976 Austrian Grand Prix	FIM Grand Prix World Championship; 1976 season	Next race: 1976 Yugoslavian Grand Prix
Previous race: 1975 Nations Grand Prix	Nations Grand Prix	Next race: 1977 Nations Grand Prix
