= 1976 Swedish motorcycle Grand Prix =

(Sweden) 1976 Swedish Grand Prix
Race details
- Race 8 of 12 races in the 1976 Grand Prix motorcycle racing season
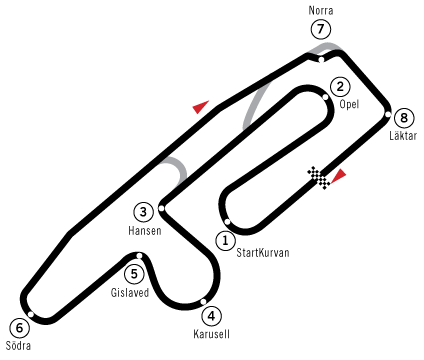
- Date: 25 July 1976
- Official name: Swedish TT
- Location: Scandinavian Raceway
- Course: Permanent racing facility; 4.018 km (2.497 mi)

500cc
Pole position
Rider	(Finland) Teuvo Länsivuori	Suzuki
Time	1:42.770	
Fastest lap
Rider	(Finland) Teuvo Länsivuori	Suzuki
Time	1:41.645	
Podium
First	(United Kingdom) Barry Sheene	Suzuki
Second	(Australia) Jack Findlay	Suzuki
Third	(United Kingdom) Chas Mortimer	Suzuki

250cc
Pole position
Rider	(Finland) Pentti Korhonen	Yamaha
Time	1:48.070	
Fastest lap
Rider	(West Germany) Dieter Braun	Yamaha
Time	1:46.834	
Podium
First	(Japan) Takazumi Katayama	Yamaha
Second	(West Germany) Dieter Braun	Yamaha
Third	(Italy) Gianfranco Bonera	Harley-Davidson

125cc
Pole position
Rider	(Italy) Pierpaolo Bianchi	Morbidelli
Time	1:48.570	
Fastest lap
Rider	(Italy) Pierpaolo Bianchi	Morbidelli
Time	1:49.263	
Podium
First	(Italy) Pierpaolo Bianchi	Morbidelli
Second	(Spain) Ángel Nieto	Bultaco
Third	(Italy) Paolo Pileri	Morbidelli

50cc
Pole position
Rider	(Spain) Ángel Nieto	Bultaco
Time	1:59.930	
Fastest lap
Rider	(Spain) Ángel Nieto	Bultaco
Time	1:58.444	
Podium
First	(Spain) Ángel Nieto	Bultaco
Second	(Switzerland) Ulrich Graf	Kreidler
Third	(Italy) Eugenio Lazzarini	Morbidelli

The 1976 Swedish motorcycle Grand Prix was the eighth round of the 1976 Grand Prix motorcycle racing season. It took place on 25 July 1976 at the Scandinavian Raceway.

== 500cc classification ==
Pos.	No.	Rider	Team	Manufacturer	Time/Retired	Points
1	7	(United Kingdom) Barry Sheene	Texaco Heron Team Suzuki	Suzuki	48'20.730	15
2	10	(Australia) Jack Findlay	Jack Findlay Racing	Suzuki	+34.178	12
3	11	(United Kingdom) Chas Mortimer		Suzuki	+34.232	10
4	4	(Finland) Teuvo Länsivuori	Life Racing Team	Suzuki	+34.869	8
5	42	(New Zealand) Stuart Avant	Colemans	Suzuki	+35.938	6
6	51	(Switzerland) Philippe Coulon		Suzuki	+37.350	5
7	20	(Spain) Víctor Palomo	Swaep Motor Racing	Yamaha	+46.690	4
8	12	(Austria) Karl Auer	Racing Team NO	Yamaha	+46.743	3
9	21	(United Kingdom) Tom Herron		Yamaha	+1'16.116	2
10	8	(United Kingdom) John Newbold	Texaco Heron Team Suzuki	Suzuki	+1'27.686	1
11	6	(United Kingdom) Alex George	Hermetite Racing International	Suzuki	+1'37.841 (Note: George was penalised one minute due to a false start.)	
12	43	(Netherlands) Marcel Ankoné	Nimag Suzuki	Suzuki	+1'41.837	
13	27	(France) Jean-François Baldé		Yamaha	+1'43.146	
14	47	(Denmark) Kaj Jensen		Yamaha	+1 lap	
15	32	(Italy) Marco Lucchinelli	Gallina Corse	Suzuki	+1 lap	
16	35	(Sweden) Bo Granath		Husqvarna	+1 lap	
17	34	(Sweden) Goran Alden		Suzuki	+2 laps	
Ret	14	(West Germany) Dieter Braun		Suzuki	Brakes	
Ret	??	(France) Patrick Pons	Team Sonauto Gauloises	Yamaha	Retired	
Ret	??	(Switzerland) Bruno Kneubühler		Yamaha	Retired	
Ret	??	(Sweden) Johnny Bengtsson	Stigefetts Motor	Suzuki	Retired	
Ret	??	(United States) Pat Hennen	Colemans	Suzuki	Infection	
Ret	??	(Norway) Kjell Solberg		Yamaha	Retired	
Ret	??	(Sweden) Peter Sjöström		Yamaha	Retired	
Ret	??	(Sweden) Sven Andersson		Yamaha	Retired	
Ret	??	(Finland) Eero Hyvärinen		Yamaha	Retired	
Ret	??	(Netherlands) Wil Hartog	Riemersma Racing	Suzuki	Retired	
Ret	??	(France) Gerard Choukroun	Team Sonauto Gauloises	Yamaha	Retired	
Ret	??	(Finland) Pentti Korhonen		Yamaha	Retired	
Ret	??	(France) Christian Estrosi		Suzuki	Retired	

Footnotes

== 250 cc classification ==
Pos	No.	Rider	Manufacturer	Laps	Time	Grid	Points
1	30	(Japan) Takazumi Katayama	Yamaha	28	50:30.009	2	15
2	14	(Germany) Dieter Braun	Yamaha	28	+9.139		12
3	25	(Italy) Gianfranco Bonera	Harley-Davidson	28	+9.492		10
4	50	(Finland) Pentti Korhonen	Yamaha	28	+11.776	1	8
5	11	(United Kingdom) Chas Mortimer	Yamaha	28	+12.058		6
6	21	(United Kingdom) Tom Herron	Yamaha	28	+21.527		5
7	19	(Switzerland) Bruno Kneubühler	Yamaha	28	+21.839		4
8	4	(Sweden) Leif Gustafsson	Yamaha	28	+28.551		3
9	22	(Finland) Tapio Virtanen	MZ	28	+48.142	5	2
10	18	(France) Patrick Pons	Yamaha	28	+53.558		1
11	51	(South Africa) Jon Ekerold	Yamaha	28	+58.790		
12	31	(Netherlands) Henk van Kessel	Yamaha	28	+1:01.077		
13	36	(Norway) Kjell Solberg	Yamaha	28	+1:10.870		
14	45	(Finland) Pekka Nurmi	Yamaha	28	+1:12.077		
15	46	(Norway) Alf Graarud	Yamaha	28	+1:12.961		
16	35	(Sweden) Bo Granath	Yamaha	28	+1:28.767		
17	34	(Japan) Ken Nemoto	Yamaha	27	+1 lap		
18	42	(Sweden) Sture Smith	SVH Yamsel	27	+1 lap		
Ret		(Italy) Paolo Pileri	Morbidelli			3	
Ret		(Italy) Walter Villa	Harley-Davidson			4	
Ret		(Spain) Víctor Palomo	Yamaha			6	
30 starters in total

== 125 cc classification ==
Pos	No.	Rider	Manufacturer	Laps	Time	Grid	Points
1	2	(Italy) Pierpaolo Bianchi	Morbidelli	26	48:33.424	1	15
2	16	(Spain) Ángel Nieto	Bultaco	26	+25.720	2	12
3	1	(Italy) Paolo Pileri	Morbidelli	26	+38.692	4	10
4	3	(Sweden) Leif Gustafsson	Yamaha	26	+38.743	6	8
5	7	(Netherlands) Henk van Kessel	AGV Condor	26	+51.714	3	6
6	24	(Germany) Gert Bender	Bender	26	+1:21.724		5
7	30	(France) Jean-Louis Guignabodet	Morbidelli	25	+1 lap		4
8	22	(Sweden) Per-Edward Carlson	Morbidelli	25	+1 lap	5	3
9	35	(Finland) Matti Kinnunen	Maico	25	+1 lap		2
10	14	(Sweden) Lennart Lindell	Morbidelli	25	+1 lap		1
11	19	(Sweden) Johnny Svensson	Bastard	25	+1 lap		
12	29	(Sweden) Roland Olsson	Syntema	25	+1 lap		
13	39	(Switzerland) Rolf Blatter	Maico	25	+1 lap		
14	17	(Austria) Hans Hummel	Morbidelli	24	+2 laps		
15	34	(Sweden) Goran Alden	Maico	24	+2 laps		
16	32	(Sweden) Jan Backström	Maico	24	+2 laps		
17	20	(Switzerland) Ulrich Graf	Yamaha	24	+2 laps		
18	40	(Denmark) Steen Ahrentzen	Maico	23	+3 laps		
19	26	(Belgium) Julien van Zeebroeck	Morbidelli	20	+6 laps		
30 starters in total

== 50 cc classification ==
Pos	No.	Rider	Manufacturer	Laps	Time	Grid	Points
1	1	(Spain) Ángel Nieto	Bultaco	16	32:09.392	1	15
2	20	(Switzerland) Ulrich Graf	Kreidler	16	+1.023	4	12
3	5	(Italy) Eugenio Lazzarini	Morbidelli	16	+15.115	2	10
4	4	(Germany) Herbert Rittberger	Kreidler	16	+47.953		8
5	17	(Austria) Hans Hummel	Kreidler	16	+59.045	5	6
6	14	(Sweden) Robert Laver	Kreidler	16	+1:06.495		5
7	27	(Netherlands) Engelbert Kip	Kreidler	16	+1:15.410		4
8	15	(Netherlands) Gerrit Strikker	Kreidler	16	+1:17.839		3
9	10	(Netherlands) Theo Timmer	Kreidler	16	+1:22.639		2
10	26	(Switzerland) Rolf Blatter	Kreidler	16	+1:27.531		1
11	12	(Italy) Aldo Pero	Kreidler	15	+1 lap		
12	25	(Germany) Günter Schirnhofer	Kreidler	15	+1 lap		
13	16	(Norway) Ove Skifjeld	Kreidler	15	+1 lap		
14	24	(Sweden) Janos Meszaros	Kreidler	15	+1 lap		
Ret		(Switzerland) Stefan Dörflinger	Kreidler			3	
Ret		(Germany) Rudolf Kunz	Kreidler			6	
20 starters in total

Previous race: 1976 Belgian Grand Prix	FIM Grand Prix World Championship; 1976 season	Next race: 1976 Finnish Grand Prix
Previous race: 1975 Swedish Grand Prix	Swedish Grand Prix	Next race: 1977 Swedish Grand Prix
