= János Drapál =

Hungarian motorcycle racer

- Nationality: (Hungary) Hungarian
- Born: 3 February 1948; Budapest, Hungary
- Died: 11 August 1985 (aged 37); Piešťany, Czechoslovakia
Motorcycle racing career statistics
Grand Prix motorcycle racing
| Active years | 1969–1973, 1976–1977, 1980–1981 |
| First race | 1969 350cc Yugoslavian Grand Prix |
| Last race | 1981 125cc West German Grand Prix |
| First win | 1971 250cc Czechoslovak Grand Prix |
| Last win | 1973 350cc Yugoslavian Grand Prix |
| Championships | 0 |
Starts / Wins / Podiums / Poles / F. laps / Points; 20 / 4 / 5 / 0 / 2 / 204

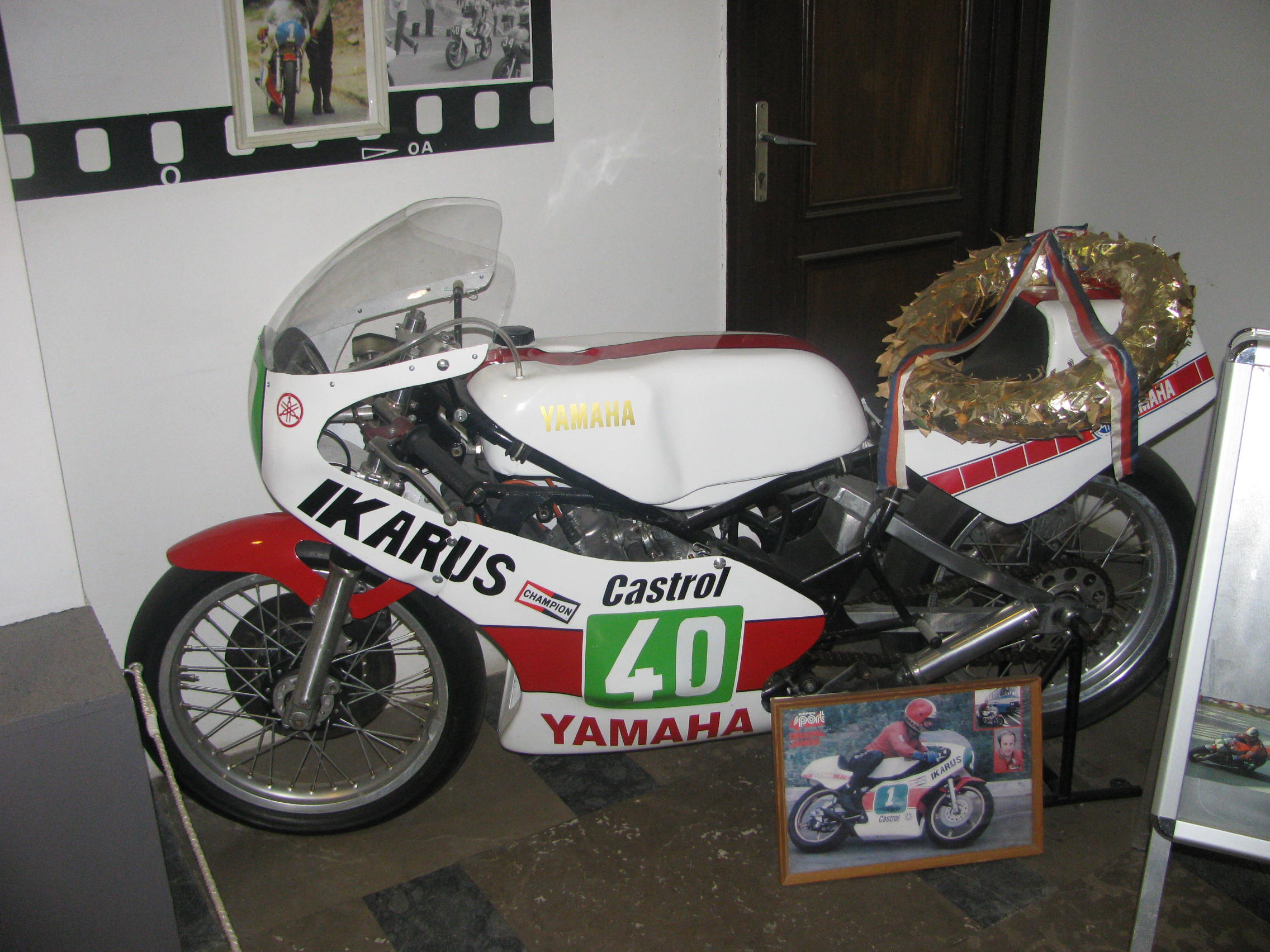
Yamaha motorcycle of János Drapál

János Drapál (3 February 1948 – 11 August 1985) was a Hungarian motorcycle road racer. He had little chance to race in the Grand Prix world championships during the Cold War, but still won four Grand Prix races. Drapál had his best year in 1971, when he won the Yugoslavian Grand Prix and finished the year in seventh place in the 350cc world championship, riding a Yamaha. In 1973, he won two Grand Prix races but slipped to ninth place in the 350cc world championship. Drapál was killed in 1985 after a collision with a Czech track marshal during a 250cc race at the Piešťany airfield circuit in Czechoslovakia.

== Grand Prix motorcycle racing results ==
Points system from 1950 to 1968:

| **Position** | 1 | 2 | 3 | 4 | 5 | 6 |
| **Points** | 8 | 6 | 4 | 3 | 2 | 1 |

Points system from 1969 onwards:

| **Position** | 1 | 2 | 3 | 4 | 5 | 6 | 7 | 8 | 9 | 10 |
| **Points** | 15 | 12 | 10 | 8 | 6 | 5 | 4 | 3 | 2 | 1 |

(key) (Races in bold indicate pole position; races in italics indicate fastest lap)

| Year | Class | Team | 1 | 2 | 3 | 4 | 5 | 6 | 7 | 8 | 9 | 10 | 11 | 12 | 13 | Points | Rank | Wins |
|---|---|---|---|---|---|---|---|---|---|---|---|---|---|---|---|---|---|---|
| 1969 | 350cc | Aermacchi | ESP - | GER - | IOM - | NED - | DDR - | TCH - | FIN - | ULS - | NAT - | YUG; 9 | | | | 2 | 42nd | 0 |
| 1970 | 125cc | MZ | GER - | FRA - | YUG - | IOM - | NED - | BEL - | DDR - | TCH - | FIN - | NAT; 10 | ESP - | | | 1 | 52nd | 0 |
| 1971 | 125cc | MZ | AUT - | GER - | IOM - | NED - | BEL - | DDR; 7 | TCH - | SWE - | FIN - | | NAT - | ESP - | | 4 | 24th | 0 |
| 1971 | 250cc | Yamaha | AUT; 5 | GER; 6 | IOM - | NED - | BEL - | DDR - | TCH; 1 | SWE - | FIN - | ULS - | NAT - | ESP - | | 26 | 9th | 1 |
| 1972 | 250cc | Yamaha | GER - | FRA - | AUT; 9 | NAT - | IOM - | YUG; 5 | NED - | BEL - | DDR; 4 | TCH - | SWE - | FIN - | ESP - | 16 | 16th | 0 |
| 1972 | 350cc | Yamaha | GER - | FRA; 5 | AUT; 5 | NAT - | IOM - | YUG; 1 | NED - | | DDR - | TCH - | SWE; 7 | FIN - | ESP; 3 | 42 | 7th | 1 |
| 1973 | 350cc | Yamaha | FRA - | AUT; 1 | GER - | NAT - | IOM - | YUG; 1 | NED - | | TCH - | SWE - | FIN - | ESP - | | 30 | 9th | 2 |
| 1976 | 250cc | Yamaha | FRA - | NAT - | YUG; 9 | IOM - | NED - | BEL - | SWE - | FIN - | TCH - | GER - | ESP - | | | 2 | 30th | 0 |
| 1977 | 125cc | Morbidelli | VEN - | AUT; 7 | GER - | NAT - | ESP - | FRA - | YUG - | NED - | BEL - | SWE - | FIN - | GBR - | | 4 | 27th | 0 |
| 1980 | 125cc | MBA | NAT - | ESP - | FRA - | YUG - | NED - | BEL - | FIN - | GBR - | TCH; 6 | GER - | | | | 5 | 23rd | 0 |
| 1981 | 125cc | MBA | ARG - | AUT - | GER; 7 | NAT - | FRA - | ESP - | YUG - | NED - | RSM - | GBR - | FIN - | SWE - | TCH - | 4 | 25th | 0 |
