= 1976 Czechoslovak motorcycle Grand Prix =

(Czechoslovakia) 1976 Czechoslovak Grand Prix
Race details
- Race 10 of 12 races in the 1976 Grand Prix motorcycle racing season
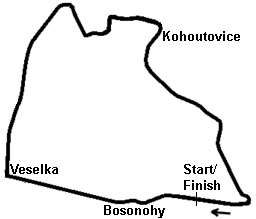
- Date: 22 August 1976
- Official name: Grand Prix ČSSR
- Location: Brno
- Course: Permanent racing facility; 10.920 km (6.785 mi)

500cc
Pole position
Rider	(Finland) Teuvo Länsivuori	Suzuki
Time	3:49.220	
Fastest lap
Rider	(Finland) Teuvo Länsivuori	Suzuki
Time	3:42.160	
Podium
First	(United Kingdom) John Newbold	Suzuki
Second	(Finland) Teuvo Länsivuori	Suzuki
Third	(Switzerland) Philippe Coulon	Suzuki

350cc
Pole position
Rider	(Italy) Walter Villa	Harley-Davidson
Time	3:50.990	
Fastest lap
Rider	(Italy) Walter Villa	
Podium
First	(Italy) Walter Villa	Harley-Davidson
Second	(Spain) Victor Palomo	Yamaha
Third	(United Kingdom) Tom Herron	Yamaha

250cc
Pole position
Rider	(Italy) Walter Villa	Harley-Davidson
Time	3:54.580	
Fastest lap
Rider	(Italy) Walter Villa	Harley-Davidson
Time	3:52.160	
Podium
First	(Italy) Walter Villa	Harley-Davidson
Second	(Italy) Gianfranco Bonera	Harley-Davidson
Third	(Japan) Takazumi Katayama	Yamaha

Sidecar (B2A)
Pole position
Rider	(West Germany) Rolf Steinhausen	König
Passenger	(West Germany) Sepp Huber	
Time	4:07.950	
Fastest lap
Rider	(Switzerland) Rolf Biland	Yamaha
Passenger	(United Kingdom) Ken Williams	
Time	4:00.570	
Podium
First rider	(Switzerland) Hermann Schmid	Yamaha
First passenger	(Switzerland) Jean-Pierre Martial	
Second rider	(West Germany) Werner Schwärzel	König
Second passenger	(West Germany) Andreas Huber	
Third rider	(Switzerland) Rolf Biland	Yamaha
Third passenger	(United Kingdom) Ken Williams	

The 1976 Czechoslovak motorcycle Grand Prix was the tenth round of the 1976 Grand Prix motorcycle racing season. It took place on 22 August 1976 at the Brno circuit.

== 500cc classification ==
Pos.	No.	Rider	Team	Manufacturer	Time/Retired	Points
1	7	(United Kingdom) John Newbold	Texaco Heron Team Suzuki	Suzuki	56'56.450	15
2	3	(Finland) Teuvo Länsivuori	Life Racing Team	Suzuki	+11.040	12
3	23	(Switzerland) Philippe Coulon		Suzuki	+22.680	10
4	11	(Austria) Karl Auer	Racing Team NO	Yamaha	+1'34.200	8
5	44	(Austria) Max Wiener	Racing Team NO	Yamaha	+1'42.860	6
6	29	(France) Olivier Chevallier		Yamaha	+1'53.110	5
7	4	(East Germany) Bernd Tügenthal		Yamaha	+2'13.200	4
8	14	(Netherlands) Boet van Dulmen	Laponder Racing	Suzuki	+3'12.190	3
9	10	(United Kingdom) Chas Mortimer		Suzuki	+3'30.680	2
10	18	(Brazil) Edmar Ferreira	Goias Swaep Motor	Yamaha	+3'31.300	1
11	30	(Sweden) Bo Granath		Yamaha	+3'52.700	
12	38	(United Kingdom) Charles Dobson		Yamaha	+1 lap	
13	41	(Hungary) János Drapál		Yamaha	+1 lap	
14	37	(Italy) Giorgio Gatti		Yamaha	+1 lap	
15	34	(Austria) Michael Schmid	Racing Team Albatros	Yamaha	+1 lap	
16	47	(West Germany) Walter Kaletsch		Yamaha	+2 laps	
17	19	(Sweden) Lars Johansson		Yamaha	+9 laps	
Ret	11	(Italy) Giacomo Agostini	Team API Marlboro	Suzuki	Retired	
Ret	10	(West Germany) Dieter Braun		Suzuki	Retired	
Ret	??	(Italy) Roberto Gallina	Gallina Corse	Suzuki	Retired	
Ret	30	(Italy) Marco Lucchinelli	Gallina Corse	Suzuki	Infection	
Ret	20	(Spain) Víctor Palomo	Swaep Motor Racing	Yamaha	Retired	
Ret	28	(United States) Pat Hennen	Colemans	Suzuki	Retired	
Ret	31	(Denmark) Børge Nielsen		Yamaha	Retired	
Ret	21	(United Kingdom) Tom Herron		Yamaha	Retired	
Ret	28	(Italy) Virginio Ferrari	Gallina Corse	Suzuki	Retired	
Ret	27	(Netherlands) Marcel Ankoné	Nimag Suzuki	Suzuki	Retired	
Ret	44	(West Germany) Helmut Kassner		Suzuki	Retired	
Ret	??	(United Kingdom) Piers Forester		Yamaha	Retired	
Ret	??	(Belgium) Jean-Philippe Orban		Suzuki	Retired	
Ret	??	(Belgium) Francois Hollebecq		Suzuki	Retired	
Ret	??	(Czechoslovakia) Peter Baláž		Yamaha	Retired	
Ret	??	(Switzerland) Roland Freymond		Yamaha	Retired	
Ret	??	(Czechoslovakia) Bohumil Staša		ČZ	Retired	
Ret	??	(France) Christian Estrosi		Suzuki	Retired	
Ret	3	(United Kingdom) Alex George	Hermetite Racing International	Urs-Métisse	Retired	
Ret	??	(Republic of Ireland) Bob Coulter		Yamaha	Retired	
5	6	(Australia) Jack Findlay	Jack Findlay Racing	Suzuki	Retired	

== 350 cc classification ==
Pos	No.	Rider	Manufacturer	Laps	Time	Grid	Points
1	5	(Italy) Walter Villa	Harley-Davidson	14	53:59.61	1	15
2	9	(Spain) Víctor Palomo	Yamaha	14	+3.05	5	12
3	8	(United Kingdom) Tom Herron	Yamaha	14	+4.98	4	10
4	3	(Finland) Pentti Korhonen	Yamaha	14	+13.66	9	8
5	6	(United Kingdom) Chas Mortimer	Yamaha	14	+16.55	13	6
6	26	(Australia) John Dodds	Yamaha	14	+19.46	11	5
7	23	(Italy) Gianfranco Bonera	Harley-Davidson	14	+1:25.18		4
8	16	(Austria) Karl Auer	Yamaha	14	+1:40.28		3
9	34	(Switzerland) Franz Kunz	Yamaha	14	+1:45.31	18	2
10	32	(France) Christian Sarron	Yamaha	14	+1:50.82		1
11	19	(Japan) Takazumi Katayama	Yamaha	14	+1:56.46	14	
12	10	(United Kingdom) Alex George	Yamaha	14	+2:27.19		
13	42	(Czechoslovakia) Peter Baláž	Yamaha	14	+2:27.29		
14	29	(Italy) Giovanni Proni	Yamaha	14	+2:44.46		
15	20	(Sweden) Leif Gustafsson	Yamaha	14	+3:15.50	17	
16	17	(Austria) Max Wiener	Yamaha	14	+3:43.38		
17	40	(Hungary) János Reisz	Yamaha	13	+1 lap		
18	45	(Czechoslovakia) Jan Bartůněk	Jawa	13	+1 lap		
19	14	(France) Olivier Chevallier	Yamaha	12	+2 laps	12	
Ret		(Venezuela) Johnny Cecotto	Yamaha			2	
Ret		(Germany) Dieter Braun	Morbidelli			3	
Ret		(Italy) Giacomo Agostini	MV Agusta			6	
Ret		(Switzerland) Bruno Kneubühler	Yamaha			7	
Ret		(France) Jean-François Baldé	Yamaha			8	
Ret		(France) Patrick Fernandez	Yamaha			10	
Ret		(Finland) Tapio Virtanen	MZ			15	
Ret		(Netherlands) Marcel Ankoné	Yamaha			16	
Ret		(France) Gérard Choukroun	Yamaha			19	
Ret		(Italy) Mario Lega	Yamaha			20	
42 starters in total

== 250 cc classification ==
Pos	No.	Rider	Manufacturer	Laps	Time	Grid	Points
1	1	(Italy) Walter Villa	Harley-Davidson	13	50:46.12	1	15
2	15	(Italy) Gianfranco Bonera	Harley-Davidson	13	+35.63	2	12
3	6	(Japan) Takazumi Katayama	Yamaha	13	+50.22	4	10
4	10	(Spain) Víctor Palomo	Yamaha	13	+53.21		8
5	8	(Switzerland) Bruno Kneubühler	Yamaha	13	+54.55	6	6
6	12	(United Kingdom) Tom Herron	Yamaha	13	+1:04.26	8	5
7	3	(Germany) Dieter Braun	Yamaha	13	+1:14.38	5	4
8	16	(Finland) Pentti Korhonen	Yamaha	13	+1:26.67	3	3
9	22	(Australia) John Dodds	Yamaha	13	+1:36.84		2
10	11	(Austria) Harald Bartol	Yamaha	13	+1:45.35		1
11	36	(Hungary) János Drapál	Yamaha	13	+1:49.91	10	
12	20	(France) Patrick Fernandez	Yamaha	13	+1:56.64	9	
13	17	(France) Olivier Chevallier	Yamaha	13	+1:56.94		
14	25	(France) Christian Sarron	Yamaha	13	+2:07.27		
15	4	(Germany) Bernd Tügenthal	Yamaha	13	+2:51.50		
16	23	(Italy) Mario Lega	Yamaha	13	+2:51.91		
17	7	(Sweden) Leif Gustafsson	Yamaha	13	+3:20.82		
18	14	(Finland) Pentti Salonen	Yamaha	13	+3:26.14		
19	23	(Austria) Rudolf Weiss	Yamaha	13	+3:26.66		
20	31	(Sweden) Bo Granath	Yamaha	13	+3:27.26		
21	39	(Czechoslovakia) Peter Baláž	Jawa	13	+3:53.43		
22	30	(Japan) Ken Nemoto	Yamaha	13	+4:16.67		
23	47	(Switzerland) Hans Stadelmann	Yamaha	12	+1 lap		
24	29	(United States) Alan Engel	Kawasaki	12	+1 lap		
25	43	(Czechoslovakia) Oldřich Kába	Jawa	12	+1 lap		
26	44	(Czechoslovakia) Vladimír Jarolím	Jawa	12	+1 lap		
27	45	(Czechoslovakia) Jan Bartůněk	Jawa	12	+1 lap		
28	46	(Hungary) János Reisz	Yamaha	12	+1 lap		
29	38	(Poland) Andrzej Szymanski	Yamaha	12	+1 lap		
30	37	(Poland) Zbygniew Chomno	Yamaha	11	+2 laps		
Ret		(Switzerland) Franz Kunz	Yamaha			7	
Ret		(Finland) Tapio Virtanen	MZ			11	
Ret		(United Kingdom) Chas Mortimer	Yamaha			12	
Ret?	42	(Czechoslovakia) Bohumil Staša	Jawa				
41 starters in total

== Sidecar classification ==
Pos	No.	Rider	Passenger	Manufacturer	Laps	Time	Grid	Points
1	7	(Switzerland) Hermann Schmid	(Switzerland) Jean-Pierre Martial	Yamaha	12	49:14.73	5	15
2	2	(Germany) Werner Schwärzel	(Germany) Andreas Huber	König	12	+0.54	2	12
3	3	(Switzerland) Rolf Biland	(United Kingdom) Ken Williams	Yamaha	12	+2.90	6	10
4	1	(Germany) Rolf Steinhausen	(Germany) Sepp Huber	König	12	+3.76	1	8
5	12	(United Kingdom) George O'Dell	(United Kingdom) Kenny Arthur	Yamaha	12	+46.61		6
6	17	(Netherlands) Martin Kooy	(Netherlands) Rob Vader	König	12	+48.71		5
7	16	(United Kingdom) Dick Greasley	(United Kingdom) Cliff Holland	Yamaha	12	+1:19.85	12	4
8	22	(Germany) Walter Ohrmann	(Germany) Bernd Grube	Yamaha	12	+1:24.68	4	3
9	25	(France) Alain Michel	(France) Bernard Garcia	Yamaha	12	+1:34.49	11	2
10	9	(Italy) Amedeo Zini	(Italy) Andrea Fornaro	König	12	+2:49.34		1
11	25	(Switzerland) Rüdi Kurth	(United Kingdom) Dane Rowe	Yamaha	11	+1 lap	10	
12	19	(Germany) Egon Schons	(Germany) Karl Lauterback	König	11	+1 lap		
13	11	(Germany) Georg Neumann	(Germany) Gerhard Lehmann	König	10	+2 laps		
14	28	(Germany) Gerhard Müller	(Germany) Gerd Hoffmann	König	10	+2 laps		
15	21	(Germany) Siegfried Schauzu	(Germany) Wolfgang Kalauch	Aro	10	+2 laps		
16	32	(Switzerland) Bruno Holzer	(Switzerland) Charly Meierhans	Yamaha	2	+10 laps		
Ret		(Switzerland) Ernst Trachsel	(Switzerland) Benedikt Stahli	Yamaha			3	
Ret		(Germany) Otto Haller	(Germany) Erich Haselbeck	BMW			7	
Ret		(Germany) Helmut Schilling	(Germany) Rainer Gundel	Aro			8	
Ret		(Germany) Max Venus	(Germany) Norbert Bittermann	König			9	
31 starters in total

Previous race: 1976 Finnish Grand Prix	FIM Grand Prix World Championship; 1976 season	Next race: 1976 German Grand Prix
Previous race: 1975 Czechoslovak Grand Prix	Czechoslovak Grand Prix	Next race: 1977 Czechoslovak Grand Prix
