= 1976 Grand Prix motorcycle racing season =

Sports season

The 1976 Grand Prix motorcycle racing season was the 28th F.I.M. Road Racing World Championship season.

== Season summary ==
Suzuki rider Barry Sheene won the first 500 Class World Championship of his career in a dominating manner by winning five of the first seven races to clinch the title with three rounds remaining. First introduced in 1974, the Suzuki RG 500 had been developed and refined by Sheene and the Suzuki team to become the class standard by 1976. Such was Suzuki's domination of the 500 class that their motorcycles occupied 11 of the first 12 places in the final points classifications. Sheene's victory also marked the first 500 Class World Championship for the Suzuki factory team.

1976 marked the end of an era as it would be the last time the Isle of Man TT would appear on the Grand Prix calendar. Once the most prestigious race of the year, the event had been increasingly boycotted by the top World Championship competitors and finally succumbed to pressure for increased safety in racing events. Safety continued to be a focal point in the increasingly bitter debate between competitors and race organizers in the wake of the deaths of Jarno Saarinen and Renzo Pasolini in 1973. The World Championship competitors still had to contend with treacherous street circuits on the Grand Prix calendar, such as Imatra, Brno, Montjuïc and Opatija, which all featured immovable roadside obstacles, including trees, telephone poles and curbs.

=== Participants ===
The Suzuki factory announced that their race team would withdraw from the World Championships after the 1975 season in order to concentrate their funding on development of the company's first range of four-stroke production motorcycles. The factory began to produce customer versions of the Suzuki RG 500 in 1976 and planned to allow privateer teams to compete in the World Championships in their stead. However, Suzuki's British importer intervened and convinced the Suzuki factory to allow the importer to represent Suzuki in the World Championships. The British Suzuki team, named Heron-Suzuki after their principle sponsor, Heron International, consisted of riders Barry Sheene, John Newbold and John Williams. The Suzuki factory allocated three RG 500 motorcycles for the British team in 1976, ostensibly one motorcycle for each of their riders. However, Sheene appropriated all three motorcycles for himself, which created animosity between him and his teammates as they had to compete with the team's heavily used 1975 RG 500s.

Sheene's crash at the 1975 Daytona 200 and his subsequent recovery received extensive media coverage and made him a household name in Britain. His charming Cockney persona made him popular with the British public and helped boost the appeal of motorcycle racing into the realm of the mass media. He was the first motorcycle racer to gain commercial endorsements from outside the sport, including television advertisements for Brut cologne. Sheene's popularity helped attract renewed interest to Grand Prix motorcycle racing which had stagnated under the dominance of the MV Agusta team.

Yamaha also withdrew from the World Championships as sales of recreational vehicles decreased significantly in the wake of the 1973 oil crisis, which caused them to reduce their competition budget. Yamaha's departure left fifteen-time World Champion Giacomo Agostini without a team so, he formed his own with the financial backing of the Marlboro cigarette company. Johnny Cecotto, the 1975 350cc World Champion, had been offered a place on the Suzuki factory team but, chose to remain loyal to his Venezuelan Yamaha satellite team, Venemotos. The Venemotos team competed in the 500 Class with Cecotto riding Agostini's 1975 Yamaha YZR500.

The last remaining manufacturer to compete with four-stroke machinery, the MV Agusta factory racing team withdrew from the World Championships following the 1975 season. The team had struggled to remain competitive as advancements in two-stroke engine technology by Japanese manufacturers were becoming evident. Once the dominant manufacturer with a streak of 17 consecutive 500 Class World Championships, the company's focus had turned to the aviation industry following the death of Count Domenico Agusta in February 1971. The Count's passion for motorcycle racing had been the driving force behind the MV Agusta team, and without his presence, the racing team's importance within the company withered. Although the team no longer competed in the World Championships, they made their 1975 MV Agusta motorcycles available for use by Agostini's new Marlboro-backed team.

MV Agusta's departure left their rider Phil Read without a team for the 1976 season, so he chose to compete as a privateer using a Suzuki RG 500. The customer version of the RG 500 was immediately competitive and became the motorcycle of choice for privateer racers that also included; Teuvo Länsivuori and newcomers Marco Lucchinelli and Pat Hennen.

=== 500 Class championship ===
With Sheene fully recovered from his injuries suffered at the 1975 Daytona 200, he set the tone for the season with a victory at the season-opening French Grand Prix. Johnny Cecotto finished second in France but then claimed that his Yamaha was too slow and refused to ride it, choosing to concentrate on defending his 350cc World Championship. Gallina-Suzuki privateer Marco Lucchinelli made an immediate impact in his first full season as a third place in France marked the first podium result of his career.

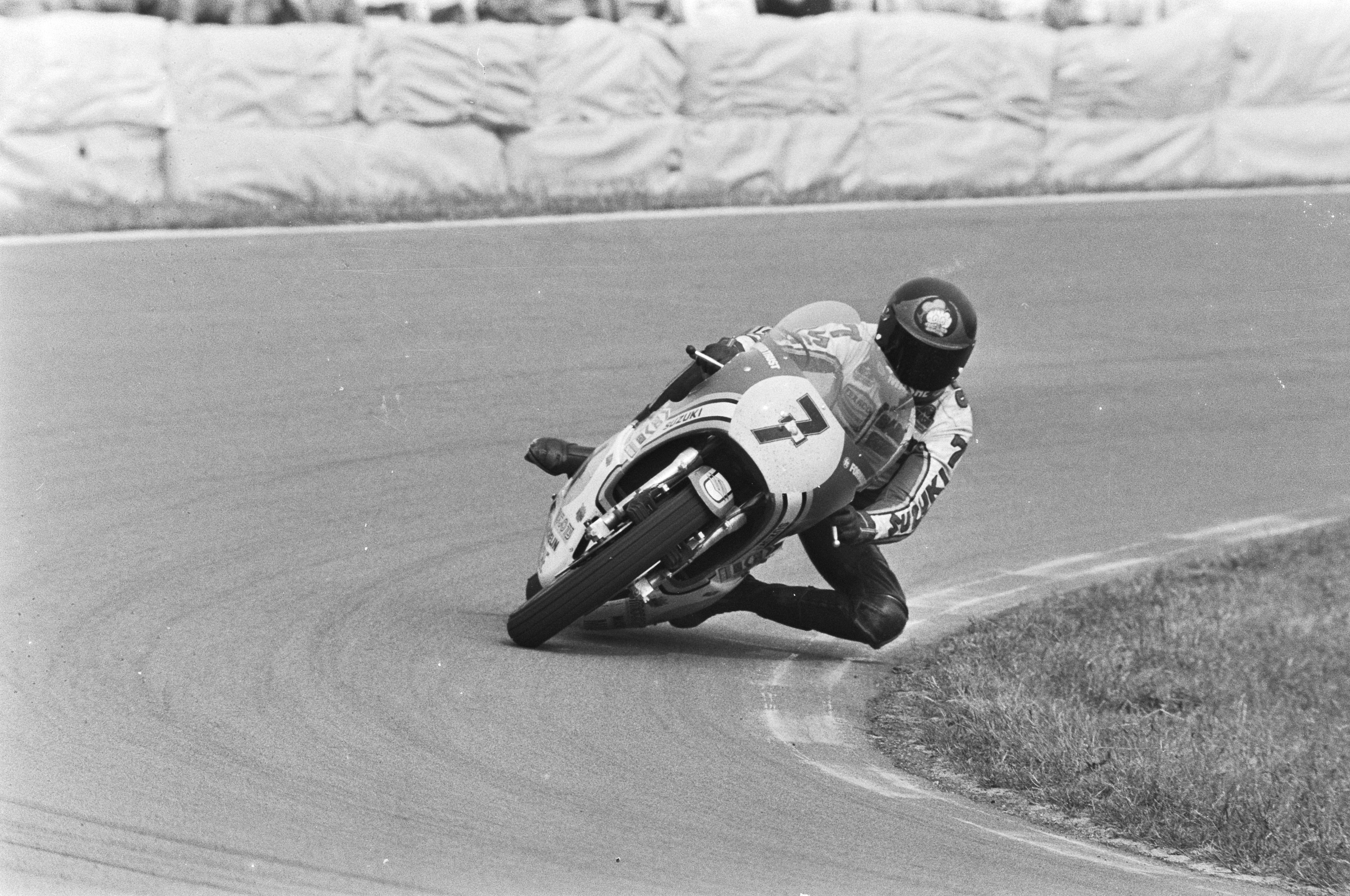
Sheene in action during the 1976 Dutch TT race.

Sheene won again in Round 2 in Austria while Lucchinelli improved to second place with Read coming in third place, as Suzuki riders swept all three podium positions. Agostini had begun the season riding an MV Agusta however, after the dominance of the Suzuki RG 500 became apparent, he purchased one of the Suzuki motorcycles for himself.

Agostini's new Suzuki RG 500 made an immediate impact in Round 3 at the Mugello Circuit in Italy where he set the fastest lap during qualifying to claim the pole position. Agostini, Sheene, and Read engaged in a three-way battle for the lead before Agostini abandoned the race due to a mechanical failure. Sheene and Read continued to engage in a dramatic race-long battle for the lead before Sheene claimed a narrow victory by 0.1 seconds to win his third consecutive Grand Prix. Marco Lucchinelli was injured during practice for the Nations Grand Prix forcing him to miss the next four races. The Gallina-Suzuki team replaced Lucchinelli with Virginio Ferrari for the race where he scored an impressive third place in his World Championship debut as Suzuki riders swept the podium positions for the second consecutive race.

The Fourth round of the championship marked the final time that the Isle of Man TT was part of the World Championship as most of the championship contenders continued to boycott the event over safety concerns. John Williams led the Senior TT by over one minute when his Suzuki broke down one mile from the finish line, allowing Tom Herron (Yamaha) to take the victory. Williams pushed his motorcycle across the finish line in seventh place. Takazumi Katayama (Yamaha) was one of the few World Championship contenders to defy convention and compete in the TT. In his first appearance at the difficult-to-master Isle of Man TT Mountain Course, Katayama scored an impressive fourth place in the 500cc Senior TT along with a second place in the 250cc Lightweight TT and a ninth-place in the 350cc Junior TT. After the 1976 season, the Isle of Man TT lost its world championship status and the British round of the championship was transferred to the Silverstone Circuit on the British mainland for the 1977 season.

Sheene continued to show his dominance by winning the Dutch TT race with a 45 second lead. Pat Hennen scored the first podium result of his career with a second-place finish in the Netherlands riding for the Coleman-Suzuki team. Read held second place in the points standings entering Round 6 of the championship in Belgium where he qualified in second position behind Sheene. However, the 37-year-old Read then abruptly disbanded his team and withdrew from the World Championships without having competed in Belgium, citing a lack of funding as the reason for his withdrawal. Although he no longer competed in the World Championships, he continued to compete in British domestic racing.

Sheene experienced engine problems in Belgium which relegated him to second place behind his Suzuki teammate John Williams. Williams' victory in Belgium marked the only Grand Prix win of his career. Sheene rebounded to win the Swedish Grand Prix, clinching the World Championship with three rounds remaining. As the FIM only recognized each competitor's top 6 results, Sheene had a near perfect score with five victories along with a second-place result. Having secured the championship, Sheene then chose not to compete in the final three rounds as he disliked riding the dangerous circuits remaining on the schedule.

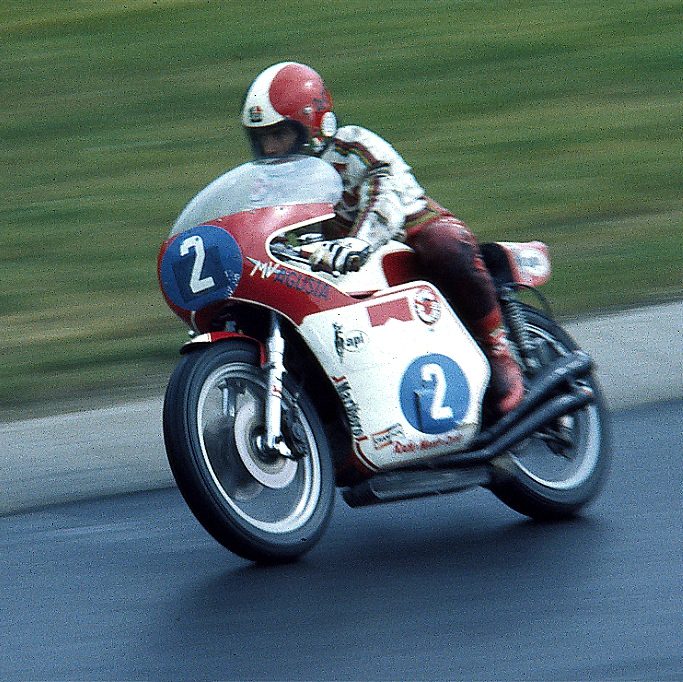
Giacomo Agostini on the 350cc MV Agusta during practice for the 1976 German Grand Prix at the Nürburgring.

Sheene's absence allowed Hennen to score an upset victory over Länsivuori and Agostini at the Finnish Grand Prix, becoming the first American competitor to win a 500 cc World Championship Grand Prix race. Suzuki's Teuvo Länsivuori was leading the Czechoslovak Grand Prix but ran out of fuel, allowing John Newbold to win the only world championship race of his career.

The final race of the season was the German Grand Prix held at the daunting, 14.2 miles (22.9 km) long Nürburgring racetrack, considered too dangerous for the Formula One championship. In rainy conditions, Agostini reverted to the MV Agusta to take advantage of the smoother power delivery of its four-stroke engine and won the race by over one minute ahead of Lucchinelli and Hennen. The victory marked final Grand Prix win for himself and for MV Agusta. It also marked the final victory for a four-stroke motorcycle until the advent of the MotoGP class in 2002.

Sheene claimed the title with 72 points, far outpacing the 48 points by second-placed Länsivuori. Hennen finished his first season in World Championship competition with an impressive third-place result only two points behind Länsivuori. Marco Lucchinelli placed fourth despite missing several rounds due to injuries. Agostini's victory at the final round in Germany on the MV Agusta boosted him to seventh place in the final classifications, making him the only non-Suzuki mounted competitor in the final top ten. Production versions of the Suzuki RG 500 became a mainstay of 500cc Grand Prix racing until the early 1980s.

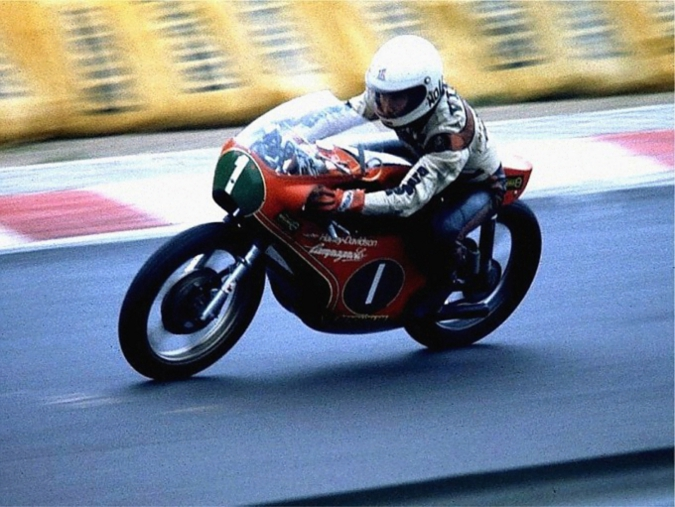
Walter Villa in action during the 1976 250cc German Grand Prix

=== Smaller classes ===
Walter Villa won double World Championships in the 250cc and 350cc classes to become only the third competitor to accomplish the feat after Jim Redman (1962, 1963) and Mike Hailwood (1966, 1967). In the 350 Class, Villa and the Harley-Davidson-Aermacchi team broke Yamaha's dominance of the class by defeating a field of competitors composed almost entirely of Yamaha TZ350 riders. Johnny Cecotto held a 15-point lead at mid-season with victories in Austria and Italy. Giacomo Agostini won the 350cc Dutch TT riding his MV 350 for the final 350 victory of his career. It also marked the last 350 class victory for MV Agusta and for four-stroke engines. Villa finished the season strongly with three victories in the final four races to overtake Cecotto and claim his first 350cc World Championship.

Villa and Harley-Davidson-Aermacchi dominated the 250 Class with seven victories in 11 races to become the first competitor to win three consecutive 250cc World Championships. Takazumi Katayama (Yamaha) finished second with a victory in Sweden along with four second place results. Otello Buscherini and Paolo Tordi died while competing in the 250cc Nations Grand Prix at the Mugello Circuit.

Angel Nieto won five races to take his fifth world title in the 50cc division, this time aboard a Bultaco. In the 125cc class, it was more of the same with Morbidelli taking another crown with Pier Paolo Bianchi claiming the championship.

== 1976 Grand Prix season calendar ==
Round	Date	Race	Location	50cc winner	125cc winner	250cc winner	350cc winner	500cc winner	Report
1	April 25	(France) French Grand Prix	Bugatti Circuit	(West Germany) Herbert Rittberger		(Italy) Walter Villa	(Italy) Walter Villa	(United Kingdom) Barry Sheene	Report
2	May 2	(Austria) Austrian Grand Prix	Salzburgring		(Italy) Pier Paolo Bianchi		(Venezuela) Johnny Cecotto	(United Kingdom) Barry Sheene	Report
3	May 16	(Italy) Nations Grand Prix	Mugello	(Spain) Angel Nieto	(Italy) Pier Paolo Bianchi	(Italy) Walter Villa	(Venezuela) Johnny Cecotto	(United Kingdom) Barry Sheene	Report
4	May 23	(Socialist Federal Republic of Yugoslavia) Yugoslavian Grand Prix	Opatija	(Switzerland) Ulrich Graf	(Italy) Pier Paolo Bianchi	(West Germany) Dieter Braun	(France) Olivier Chevallier		Report
5	June 12	(United Kingdom) Isle of Man TT	Isle of Man			(United Kingdom) Tom Herron	(United Kingdom) Chas Mortimer	(United Kingdom) Tom Herron	Report
6	June 26	(Netherlands) Dutch TT	Assen	(Spain) Angel Nieto	(Italy) Pier Paolo Bianchi	(Italy) Walter Villa	(Italy) Giacomo Agostini	(United Kingdom) Barry Sheene	Report
7	July 4	(Belgium) Belgian Grand Prix	Spa-Francorchamps	(West Germany) Herbert Rittberger	(Spain) Angel Nieto	(Italy) Walter Villa		(United Kingdom) John Williams	Report
8	July 25	(Sweden) Swedish Grand Prix	Anderstorp	(Spain) Angel Nieto	(Italy) Pier Paolo Bianchi	(Japan) Takazumi Katayama		(United Kingdom) Barry Sheene	Report
9	August 1	(Finland) Finnish Grand Prix	Imatra	(Belgium) Julien van Zeebroeck	(Italy) Pier Paolo Bianchi	(Italy) Walter Villa	(Italy) Walter Villa	(United States) Pat Hennen	Report
10	August 22	(Czechoslovakia) Czechoslovak Grand Prix	Brno			(Italy) Walter Villa	(Italy) Walter Villa	(United Kingdom) John Newbold	Report
11	August 29	(West Germany) German Grand Prix	Nürburgring Nordschleife	(Spain) Angel Nieto	(West Germany) Anton Mang	(Italy) Walter Villa	(Italy) Walter Villa	(Italy) Giacomo Agostini	Report
12	September 19	(Spain) Spanish Grand Prix	Montjuich	(Spain) Angel Nieto	(Italy) Pier Paolo Bianchi	(Italy) Franco Bonera	(South Africa) Kork Ballington		Report

== Participants ==
=== 500cc participants ===
Team	Constructor	Motorcycle	No.	Rider	Rounds
Team Agostini-Marlboro	MV Agusta/Suzuki	???/???	1	(Italy) Giacomo Agostini	1–3, 5–6, 8–10
Team Life International	Suzuki	Suzuki RG 500	2; 9	(United Kingdom) Phil Read	1–3
Life Racing Team	Suzuki	Suzuki RG 500	4; 2; 3	(Finland) Teuvo Länsivuori	1–3, 6–9*
Danfay	Yamaha	???	4	(Republic of Ireland) Billie Guthrie	4
Texaco Heron Team Suzuki	Suzuki	???	5; 2; 30	(United Kingdom) John Williams	1–2, 4–6
Texaco Heron Team Suzuki	Suzuki	Suzuki RG 500	7	(United Kingdom) Barry Sheene	1–3, 5–7
Texaco Heron Team Suzuki	Suzuki	Suzuki RG 500	8; 3; 6; 7	(United Kingdom) John Newbold	6–10
Texaco Heron Team Suzuki	Suzuki	???	14	(United Kingdom) Tom Herron	2, 4
Hermetite	Various	???	6; 8; 3	(United Kingdom) Alex George	2, 5
Meuaui Racing Team	Suzuki	???	10; 6; 5	(Australia) Jack Findlay	2–8
Team Sarome	Yamaha/Suzuki	???/???	11; 8; 10	(United Kingdom) Chas Mortimer	1, 4, 6–7, 9–10
Team Sarome	Yamaha	???	41; 17	(Japan) Takazumi Katayama	4, 6, 8
???	Yamaha	???	12; 8; 9; 11	(Austria) Karl Auer	1–2, 7–9
Boeri Dainese Racing Team	Suzuki	???	13; 14; 30; 10; 12	(West Germany) Dieter Braun	1–3, 6, 8
Esso	Yamaha	???	19; 18; 25; 29	(France) Olivier Chevallier	9
Ecurie Elf	Suzuki	???	21; 20	(France) Michel Rougerie	1–2, 6
???	Yamaha	???	22; 13; 16	(France) Bernard Fau	5
Castrol/Jim Findlay	Yamaha	Yamaha TZ???	23; 15; 19; 21	(United Kingdom) Tom Herron	6–7
Beale	Yamaha	???	23	(United Kingdom) Roger Nichols	4
???	Suzuki	???	24; 52; 21; 48	(France) Christian Estrosi	8
???	Yamaha	???	25	(United Kingdom) Ian Richards	4
???	Yamaha	???	26; 41; 31; 24	(Denmark) Børge Nielsen	3
???	Suzuki	???	27; 33; 28; 43; 12	(Netherlands) Marcel Ankoné	3, 6, 10
Gallina Corse	Suzuki	Suzuki RG 500	28; 40; 26; 31	(Italy) Virginio Ferrari	3, 10
Gallina Corse	Suzuki	Suzuki RG 500	33; 40; 34; 32; 30; 17	(Italy) Marco Lucchinelli	1–2, 7–10
Gallina Corse	Suzuki	???	34	(Italy) Roberto Gallina	???
Riemersma	Suzuki	Suzuki RG 500	34; 31; 48	(Netherlands) Wil Hartog	2, 5, 7
Padgett	Yamaha	???	38; 26	(South Africa) Jon Ekerold	4
Frankonia Suzuki	Suzuki	???	40; 38; 18; 43; 51; 22; 23; 71	(Switzerland) Philippe Coulon	3, 7–9
???	Suzuki	???	41; 39; 19; 44; 63	(West Germany) Helmut Kassner	5–6
Swaep Motor-Racing	Yamaha	???	43; 33; 24; 20	(Spain) Víctor Palomo	1–2, 7
Laponder	Yamaha/Suzuki	???/???	51; 43; 32; 27; 39; 14; 29	(Netherlands) Boet van Dulmen	8–10
Colemans	Suzuki	???	54; 45; 25; 40; 28; 22; 66	(United States) Pat Hennen	1–3, 5–10
Colemans	Suzuki	???	56; 47; 32; 35; 42; 25	(New Zealand) Stuart Avant	1–3, 7
Team Venemotos	Yamaha	Yamaha YZR500 (OW29)	55; 3; 21; 16	(Venezuela) Johnny Cecotto	1–3
???	Yamaha	???	57; 28; 44; 27	(Austria) Max Wiener	9

Key
Regular Rider
Wildcard Rider
Replacement Rider

== Final standings ==
=== Scoring system ===
Points were awarded to the top ten finishers in each race. The three best results from the first four rounds plus the three best results from the remaining rounds were counted on 50cc, 125cc and Sidecars championships, while in the 250cc, 350cc and 500cc championships, the three best results from the first five rounds plus the three best results from the remaining rounds were counted.

(key)

Position	1st	2nd	3rd	4th	5th	6th	7th	8th	9th	10th
Points	15	12	10	8	6	5	4	3	2	1

=== 500cc final standings ===
Place	Rider	Team	Machine	FRA (France)	AUT (Austria)	NAT (Italy)	GBR (United Kingdom)	NED (Netherlands)	BEL (Belgium)	SWE (Sweden)	FIN (Finland)	CZE (Czech Republic)	GER (West Germany)	Points
1	(United Kingdom) Barry Sheene	Heron-Suzuki	RG500	1	1	1		1	2	1				72
2	(Finland) Teuvo Länsivuori	Team Life International	RG500	4	DSQ	4			5	4	2	2		48
3	(United States) Pat Hennen	Coleman-Suzuki	RG500	Ret	Ret	5		2	8	Ret	1	Ret	3	46
4	(Italy) Marco Lucchinelli	Gallina Corse	RG500	3	2	DNS				15	5	Ret	2	40
5	(United Kingdom) John Newbold	Heron-Suzuki	RG500			Ret		Ret	9	10	4	1	4	31
6	(Switzerland) Philippe Coulon	Frankonia Suzuki	RG500	Ret	Ret	8		Ret	Ret	6	3	3	Ret	28
7	(Italy) Giacomo Agostini	Team API Marlboro	MV500	5	6								1	26
7	(Italy) Giacomo Agostini	Team API Marlboro	RG500			Ret		Ret	Ret		Ret	Ret		26
8	(Australia) Jack Findlay	Jack Findlay Racing	RG500		8	Ret	Ret	5	Ret	2	7			25
9	(United Kingdom) John Williams	Heron-Suzuki	RG500	Ret	Ret		7	6	1					24
10	(United Kingdom) Phil Read	Team Life International	RG500	Ret	3	2								22
11	(Netherlands) Marcel Ankoné	Nimag-Suzuki	RG500	Ret		6		Ret	3	12	Ret	Ret	5	21
12	(New Zealand) Stuart Avant	Coleman-Suzuki	RG500	7	5	7		Ret	DNS	5	Ret			20
13	(United Kingdom) Tom Herron	Castrol-Jim Findlay	TZ350		12		1			9		Ret		17
14	(United Kingdom) Chas Mortimer	Katayama Sarome Team	YZR500	13	Ret		Ret							16
14	(United Kingdom) Chas Mortimer		RG500						7	3	Ret	9	9	16
14	(France) Michel Rougerie	Ecurie Elf	RG500	DNS	4	Ret		Ret	4					16
14	(Austria) Karl Auer	Racing Team NO	YZR500	9	9	Ret		Ret	Ret	8	10	4	Ret	16
17	(West Germany) Dieter Braun	Boeri Dainese Racing Team	RG500	8	15	9			6	Ret	6	Ret	Ret	15
18	(Spain) Víctor Palomo	Swaep Motor Racing	YZR500	6	7	Ret			Ret	7		Ret		13
19	(Venezuela) Johnny Cecotto	Venemotos Yamaha	YZR500	2	Ret	Ret							DNS	12
19	(United Kingdom) Ian Richards		YZR500				2							12
21	(Italy) Virginio Ferrari	Gallina Corse	RG500			3					Ret	Ret	Ret	10
21	(United Kingdom) Billie Guthrie	Danfay	YZR500				3							10
21	(Netherlands) Wil Hartog	Riemersma Racing	RG500		Ret			3		Ret				10
24	(United Kingdom) Alex George	Hermetite Racing International	YZR500	15	10		Ret	4	11	11	Ret	Ret	Ret	9
24	(Netherlands) Boet Van Dulmen	Laponder Racing	YZR500	10	13	Ret		Ret						9
24	(Netherlands) Boet Van Dulmen	Laponder Racing	RG500						13		Ret	8	6	9
26	(Japan) Takazumi Katayama	Katayama Sarome Team	YZR500		DNS		4		Ret		Ret			8
27	(Austria) Max Weiner	Racing Team NO	YZR500	Ret	16	11						5	12	6
27	(United Kingdom) Roger Nichols	Beale	YZR500				5							6
29	(France) Olivier Chevallier	Esso	YZR500	11	18				Ret			6		5
29	(South Africa) Jon Ekerold	Padgett's Motorcycles	YZR500				6							5
31	(France) Bernard Fau		YZR500					7	Ret		11			4
31	(West Germany) Bernd Tungethal		YZR500									7	Ret	4
31	(South Africa) Alan North		RG500										7	4
34	(United Kingdom) Gordon Pantall		YZR500				8							3
34	(Netherlands) Rob Bron		YZR500					8			12			3
34	(France) Christian Estrosi		RG500	Ret				Ret		Ret	8	Ret		3
34	(France) Christian Bourgeois		YZR500										8	3
34	(West Germany) Helmut Kassner		RG500	19	11			9	10			Ret	Ret	3
39	(United Kingdom) John Weeden		YZR500				9							2
39	(Finland) Pekka Nurmi		YZR500								9			2
41	(Denmark) Børge Nielsen		YZR500		17	10					13	Ret	Ret	1
41	(United Kingdom) Bill Smith		YZR500				10							1
41	(United Kingdom) Dave Potter		RG500					10						1
41	(Brazil) Edmar Ferreira		YZR500	16		Ret					Ret	10		1
41	(West Germany) Egid Schwemmer		RG500										10	1
Sources: Notes: Länsivuori was disqualified from the Austrian Grand Prix for not stopping his engine during a refueling stop.

=== 350cc standings ===
Place	Rider	Number	Country	Machine	Points	Wins
1	(Italy) Walter Villa	42	Italy	Aermacchi Harley-Davidson	76	4
2	(Venezuela) Johnny Cecotto	1	Venezuela	Yamaha	65	2
3	(United Kingdom) Chas Mortimer	6	United Kingdom	Yamaha	54	1
4	(United Kingdom) Tom Herron	9	United Kingdom	Yamaha	47	0
5	(Australia) John Dodds	56	Australia	Yamaha	34	0
6	(Spain) Víctor Palomo		Spain	Yamaha	29	0
7	(Japan) Takazumi Katayama		Japan	Yamaha	28	0
8	(Switzerland) Bruno Kneubühler		Switzerland	Yamaha	28	0
9	(France) Olivier Chevallier		France	Yamaha	27	1
10	(Italy) Franco Uncini		Italy	Yamaha	27	0
11	Dieter Braun				23	
12	Kork Ballington				20	
13	Pentti Korhonen				19	
14	Patrick Pons				18	
15	Gianfranco Bonera				15	
16	Giacomo Agostini				15	
17	Tony Rutter				12	
18	Billie Guthrie				10	
19	Gerard Choukroun				10	
20	Alan North				10	
21	Jean-François Baldé				10	
22	Martin Sharpe				8	
23	Leif Gustafsson				8	
24	Boet Van Dulmen				6	
25	John Weeden				5	
26	Patrick Fernandez				5	
27	Paolo Tordi				5	
28	Derek Chatterton				5	
29	Jon Ekerold				4	
30	Neil Tuxworth				4	
31	Philip Bouzanne				3	
32	Karl Auer				3	
33	Jack Findlay				3	
34	Kjell Solberg				3	
35	Bo Granath				2	
36	Rudolf Kunz				2	
37	Claudio Loigo				1	
38	S.McClements				1	

=== 250cc standings ===
Place	Rider	Number	Country	Machine	Points	Wins
1	(Italy) Walter Villa	1	Italy	Aermacchi Harley-Davidson	90	7
2	(Japan) Takazumi Katayama		Japan	Yamaha	73	1
3	(Italy) Franco Bonera		Italy	Aermacchi Harley-Davidson	61	1
4	(United Kingdom) Tom Herron		United Kingdom	Yamaha	47	1
5	(Finland) Pentti Korhonen		Finland	Yamaha	47	0
6	(West Germany) Dieter Braun		West Germany	Yamaha	42	1
7	(United Kingdom) Chas Mortimer	6	United Kingdom	Yamaha	31	0
8	(Switzerland) Bruno Kneubühler	9	Switzerland	Yamaha	29	0
9	(France) Olivier Chevallier		France	Yamaha	25	0
10	(Spain) Víctor Palomo		Spain	Yamaha	25	0
11	John Dodds				24	
12	Patrick Fernandez				21	
13	Kork Ballington				15	
14	Paolo Pileri				12	
15	Jon Ekerold				10	
16	Alan North				10	
17	Tony Rutter				8	
18	Jean-François Baldé				8	
19	Eddie Roberts				6	
20	Gerard Choukroun				6	
21	Franco Uncini				6	
22	Patrick Pons				6	
23	Philip Bouzanne				6	
24	Pekka Nurmi				5	
25	Alex George				5	
26	Boet van Dulmen				4	
27	John Weeden				4	
28	Ian Richards				3	
29	Leif Gustafsson				3	
30	Dennis Casement				2	
31	Jean Claude Hogrel				2	
32	Tapio Virtanen				2	
33	János Drapál				2	
32	Harald Bartol				1	
33	Eero Hyvärinen				1	
34	Niel Tuxworth				1	

=== 125cc standings ===
Place	Rider	Number	Country	Machine	Points	Wins
1	(Italy) Pier Paolo Bianchi	2	Italy	Morbidelli	90	7
2	(Spain) Ángel Nieto		Spain	Bultaco	67	1
3	(Italy) Paolo Pileri	1	Italy	Morbidelli	64	0
4	(Netherlands) Henk van Kessel	7	Netherlands	Condor	46	0
5	(West Germany) Anton Mang		West Germany	Morbidelli	32	1
6	(France) Jean-Louis Guignabodet	2	France	Morbidelli	27	0
7	(Italy) Eugenio Lazzarini	5	Italy	Morbidelli	26	0
8	(West Germany) Gert Bender		West Germany	Bender	25	0
9	(Switzerland) Stefan Dörflinger		Switzerland	Morbidelli	23	0
10	(Belgium) Julien van Zeebroeck		Belgium	Morbidelli	18	0
11	Xaver Tschannen				14	
12	Walter Koschine				12	
13	Cees van Dongen				11	
14	Otello Buscherini				10	
15	Leif Gustafsson				10	
16	Harald Bartol				9	
17	Hans Müller				9	
18	Horst Seel				8	
19	Enrico Cereda				7	
20	Pierluigi Conforti				7	
21	Lennart Lundgren				6	
22	Per Edward Carlsson				6	
23	Johann Zemsauer				5	
24	Matti Kinnunen				5	
25	Rolf Blatter				4	
26	Luigi Richetti				4	
27	Hans Hummel				4	
28	Peter Frohnmeyer				3	
29	Ermanno Giuliano				2	
30	Auno Hakala				2	
31	Hans Hallberg				1	
32	Lennart Lindell				1	
33	Heinz Schmid				1	
34	P.Cecchini				1	

=== 50cc standings ===
Place	Rider	Number	Country	Machine	Points	Wins
1	(Spain) Ángel Nieto	1	Spain	Bultaco	85	5
2	(West Germany) Herbert Rittberger	5	West Germany	Kreidler	76	2
3	(Switzerland) Ulrich Graf		Switzerland	Kreidler	69	1
4	(Italy) Eugenio Lazzarini	2	Italy	Morbidelli	53	0
5	(West Germany) Rudolf Kunz	4	West Germany	Kreidler	34	0
6	(Belgium) Julien van Zeebroeck	9	Belgium	Kreidler	26	1
7	(Switzerland) Stefan Dörflinger	6	Switzerland	Kreidler	25	0
8	(Switzerland) Rolf Blatter		Switzerland	Kreidler	25	0
9	(Austria) Hans Hummel	9	Austria	Kreidler	20	0
10	(France) Pierre Audry		France	ABF	15	0
11	Aldo Pero				13	
12	Theo Timmer				12	
13	Engelbert Kip				12	
14	Gerrit Strikker				9	
15	Cees van Dongen				9	
16	Benjamin Laurent				8	
17	Günter Schirnhofer				7	
18	Theo Van Geffen				6	
19	Ricardo Tormo				5	
20	Robert Laver				5	
21	Claudio Lusuardi				4	
22	Yves Le Tourmelin				4	
23	E. Mischiatti				4	
24	B. Stopp				4	
25	Wolfgang Müller				3	
26	Ramon Gali				3	
27	Ermanno Giuliano				1	

== See also ==
- 1976 Formula 750 season
