= Franz Kunz =

Swiss skier

Personal information
- Born: 1899
- Died: Unknown

Sport
- Sport: Skiing

Franz Kunz (born 1899, date of death unknown) was a Swiss skier. He competed in the military patrol at the 1928 Summer Olympics.
