= John Newbold =

British motorcycle racer

- Nationality: British
- Born: 14 December 1952; Jacksdale, England
- Died: 15 May 1982 (aged 29); Coleraine, Northern Ireland
Motorcycle racing career statistics
Grand Prix motorcycle racing
Active years	1974 - 1980
First race	1974 350cc Dutch TT
Last race	1980 500cc British Grand Prix
First win	1976 500cc Czechoslovak Grand Prix
Last win	1976 500cc Czechoslovak Grand Prix
Championships	0
Starts / Wins / Podiums / Poles / F. laps / Points; 15 / 1 / 2 / 0 / 1 / 72

John Newbold (14 December 1952 – 15 May 1982) was an English professional Grand Prix motorcycle road racer. He competed in Grand Prix motorcycle racing between 1974 and 1980, most prominently as a member of the Suzuki factory racing team. He died while competing in the 1982 North West 200 race in Northern Ireland.

== Motorcycle racing career ==
Newbold was born on 14 December 1952 in Jacksdale, England, where his parents operated a butchers shop. Later in married life, he lived in South Normanton. He began riding in motorcycle grasstrack competitions when he was 15. He progressed from riding at Darley Moor on a Yamsel motorcycle loaned to him by John Cooper, to performing in front of 50,000 spectators at the Silverstone Circuit.

Newbold placed second in the 1974 ACU British Championship and scored a seventh-place result at the 1974 350cc Dutch TT. His performance earned him a contract to race for the British Suzuki team in the 500cc World Championship as Barry Sheene's teammate for the 1975 season. He earned his first 500cc World Championship points with a seventh place at the 1975 Nations Grand Prix held at the Imola Circuit. He improved to a fourth place at the 1975 Dutch TT, then secured the best result of the season with a second place at the Belgian Grand Prix behind Phil Read (MV Agusta).

The Suzuki factory announced that their race team would withdraw from the World Championships after the 1975 season in order to concentrate their funding on development of the company's first range of four-stroke production motorcycles. The announcement left Newbold without a motorcycle until Suzuki's British importer intervened and convinced the Suzuki factory to allow the importer to represent Suzuki in the World Championships.

The British Suzuki team was named Heron-Suzuki after their principle sponsor, Heron International, with rider John Williams joining Newbold and Sheene on the team for the 1976 season. The Suzuki factory allocated three Suzuki RG 500 motorcycles for the British team in 1976, ostensibly one motorcycle for each of their riders however, Sheene appropriated all three motorcycles for himself, which created animosity between Sheene and his teammates as they had to compete with the team's 1975 RG 500s.

Newbold had a poor start to the 1976 season as he failed to score any points in the first five rounds while Sheene dominated by winning five of the first seven races to clinch the World Championship with three rounds remaining. Having secured the championship, Sheene then chose not to compete in the final three rounds as he disliked riding the dangerous circuits remaining on the schedule. In Sheene's absence, Newbold posted the best results of his world championship career. He placed fourth at the Finnish Grand Prix then scored the only Grand Prix victory of his career at the 500cc Czechoslovak Grand Prix after early race leader Teuvo Länsivuori (Suzuki) ran out of fuel. He placed fourth at the season-ending German Grand Prix to end the year ranked fifth in the 500cc World Championship. He also placed third in the 1976 Formula 750 season behind Victor Palomo (Yamaha) and Gary Nixon (Kawasaki). Despite these results, Newbold and Williams were released from their Suzuki contracts at the end of the season and replaced by Pat Hennen and Steve Parrish.

Newbold returned to British domestic racing in 1977, finishing second in the British 500cc championship on a Ray Hamblin-sponsored Suzuki RG 500. At the 1977 North West 200 Superbike race in Northern Ireland, John Williams won however, Newbold set a lap record of 123.81 MPH while catching and overtaking Steve Parrish for second place. At the 1978 North West 200, he reset the lap record and won the race. Newbold made another attempt to compete in the 500cc World Championships in 1978 riding a Suzuki RG 500 for the Ray Hamblin team. After experiencing numerous reliability issues with his Suzuki, he withdrew from the World Championships at mid-season to concentrate on the British national racing competitions. His best result in the World Championship was a seventh place at the 1978 Dutch TT. In the 1978 British 500cc championship, Newbold finished second to Barry Sheene.

Newbold joined the Appleby Glade racing team in 1979 but, suffered a broken leg during a race at Oulton Park and would miss most of the season recovering from his injury. He returned late in the season to score a second place to Joey Dunlop at the 1979 Ulster Grand Prix. Newbold led the 1980 North West 200 race in the 500 class when he was forced to retire with a mechanical failure. He battled Keith Huewen for the lead in the 1000cc race but eventually finished in second place.

Newbold returned to the 500cc World Championship once again in 1981, when he rejoined the British Suzuki team alongside teammates Graeme Crosby and Mick Grant. Newbold led the British team to victory as the top overall points scorer at the 1981 Transatlantic Trophy match races. John Newbold was the top points scorer for Great Britain, who won the series 466-345. The Transatlantic Trophy match races pitted the best British riders against the top American road racers on 750cc motorcycles in a six-race series in England over the Easter holiday weekend. He led the 500cc race at the North West 200 in 1981, only to retire once again with another mechanical failure. Newbold made his debut at the Isle of Man TT in 1981, finishing fourth and third. He finished the season ranked second overall in the British Formula TT F1 championship and was ranked fourth in the British 500cc championship.

== Death ==
On 15 May 1982, Newbold died from injuries sustained in a collision with Mick Grant during the 1982 North West 200 in Coleraine, Northern Ireland.
