= Herbert Rittberger =

German motorcycle racer

- Nationality: German
Motorcycle racing career statistics
Grand Prix motorcycle racing
Active years	1973 - 1977
First race	1973 50cc West German Grand Prix
Last race	1977 50cc Belgian Grand Prix
First win	1974 50cc Dutch TT
Last win	1977 50cc West German Grand Prix
Team	Kreidler
Starts / Wins / Podiums / Poles / F. laps / Points; 32 / 4 / 14 / 1 / 0 / 249

Herbert Rittberger (born 16 May 1949) is a former Grand Prix motorcycle road racer from Germany. His best years were in 1974, when he finished second to Henk van Kessel in the 50cc world championship, and 1976 when he again finished second in the 50cc world championship, this time to Angel Nieto. Rittberger won four Grand Prix races during his career.
