= Ulrich Graf (motorcyclist) =

Swiss motorcycle racer

- Nationality: (Switzerland) Swiss
Motorcycle racing career statistics
Grand Prix motorcycle racing
Active years	1970 - 1971, 1973 - 1977
First race	1970 50cc Spanish Grand Prix
Last race	1977 50cc Spanish Grand Prix
First win	1976 50cc Yugoslavian Grand Prix
Last win	1976 50cc Yugoslavian Grand Prix
Starts / Wins / Podiums / Poles / F. laps / Points; 31 / 1 / 9 / 1 / 0 / 166

Ulrich Graf (15 August 1946 – 19 June 1977) was a Grand Prix motorcycle road racer from Switzerland. His best year was in 1976 when he won the 50cc Yugoslavian Grand Prix and finished in third place in the 50cc world championship, behind Angel Nieto and Herbert Rittberger. Graf was killed while competing at the 1977 Yugoslavian Grand Prix.
