= Olivier Chevallier =

French motorcycle racer (1949–1980)

- Nationality: French
Motorcycle racing career statistics
Grand Prix motorcycle racing
| Active years | 1971 Bol dOr 1972 - 1979 |
| First race | 1972 250cc Spanish Grand Prix |
| Last race | 1980 250cc French Grand Prix |
| First win | 1976 350cc Yugoslavian Grand Prix |
| Last win | 1976 350cc Yugoslavian Grand Prix |
Starts / Wins / Podiums / Poles / F. laps / Points; 54 / 1 / 7 / 1 / 0 / 254

Olivier Pierre Albin Chevallier (6 February 1949 - 6 April 1980) was a French professional Grand Prix motorcycle road racer.

Born in Vendôme, Loir-et-Cher, Chevallier's best year was in 1977 when he finished in sixth place in the 350cc world championship. His only Grand Prix victory came at the 1976 350cc Yugoslavian Grand Prix at Opatija. He was killed while competing at the Grand Prix of Le Castellet in 1980. Chevallier raced motorcycles designed and built by his brother Alain Chevallier, using Yamaha engines.
