= Julien Vanzeebroeck =

Belgian motorcycle racer

- Nationality: (Belgium) Belgian
Motorcycle racing career statistics
Grand Prix motorcycle racing
| Active years | 1974 - 1978 |
| First race | 1974 50cc Finnish Grand Prix |
| Last race | 1978 50cc Nations Grand Prix |
| First win | 1974 50cc Finnish Grand Prix |
| Last win | 1976 50cc Finnish Grand Prix |
| Team | Kreidler |
| Championships | 0 |
Starts / Wins / Podiums / Poles / F. laps / Points; 26 / 3 / 10 / 2 / 0 / 186

Julien Vanzeebroeck (born 7 July 1946) is a Belgian former professional Grand Prix motorcycle road racer. He made his Grand Prix debut in 1974, racing in the 50cc class. His best years were in 1974 and 1975, finishing third in the 50cc world championship both years.
