= Henk van Kessel =

Dutch motorcycle racer

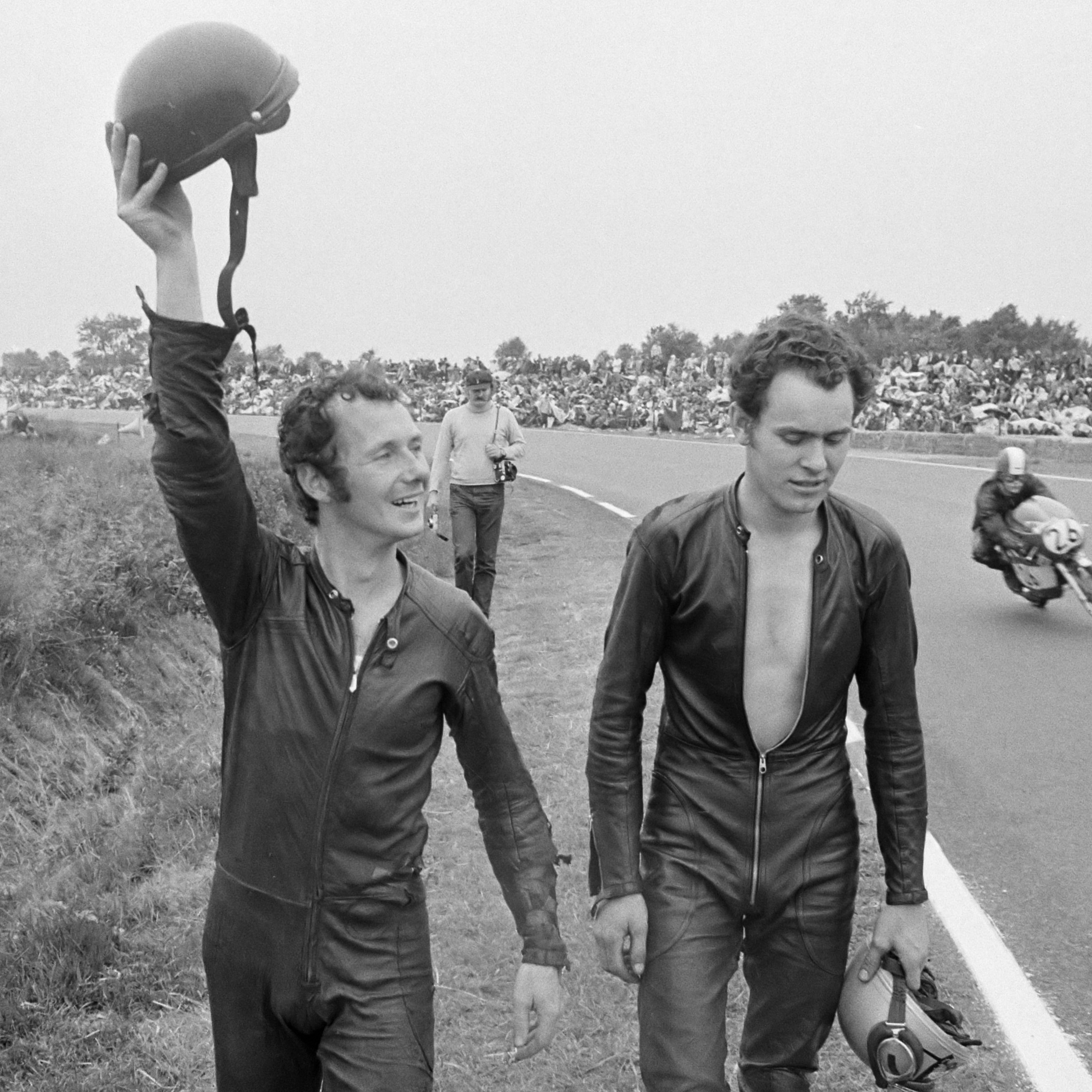
- Henk van Kessel (r.) with Jan de Vries (1971)
- Nationality: Dutch
Motorcycle racing career statistics
Grand Prix motorcycle racing
Active years	1972 - 1976, 1978 - 1986
First race	1972 50cc Swedish Grand Prix
Last race	1986 Baden-Württemberg Grand Prix
First win	1974 50cc French Grand Prix
Last win	1979 50cc Belgian Grand Prix
Team	Kreidler
Championships	50cc - 1974
Starts / Wins / Podiums / Poles / F. laps / Points; 87 / 7 / 25 / 4 / 0 / 422

Henk van Kessel (born 25 June 1946, Mill) is a Dutch former Grand Prix motorcycle road racer. He won the 1974 F.I.M. 50 cc world championship. He won seven Grand Prix races during his lengthy career.

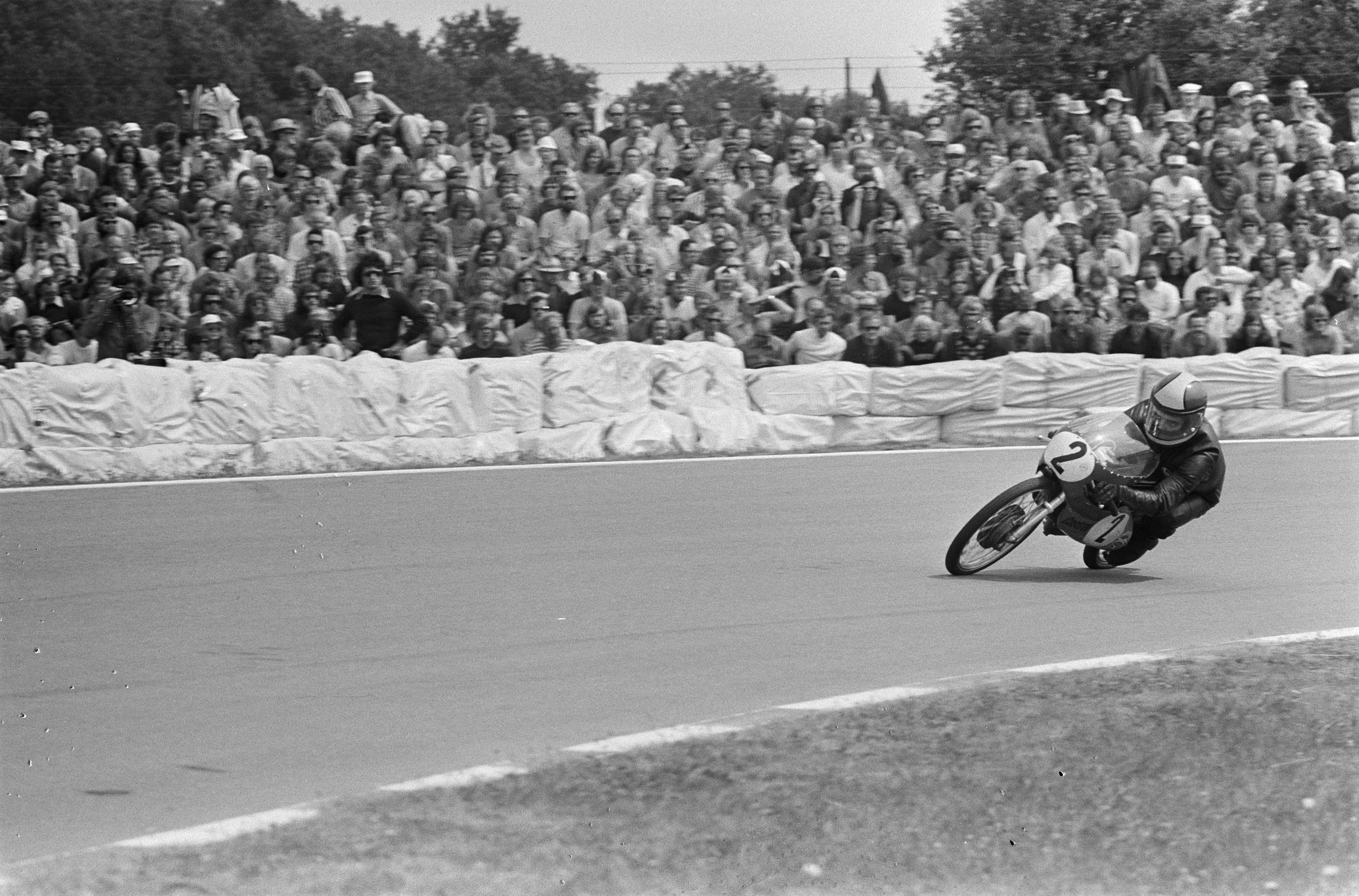
Henk van Kessel in action during the 1974 50cc Dutch TT.
