= Claudio Lusuardi =

Italian motorcycle racer (born 1949)

- Nationality: Italian
- Born: 30 December 1949 (age 76); Modena, Italy
Motorcycle racing career statistics
Grand Prix motorcycle racing
Active years	1972 - 1983
First race	1972 50cc Nations Grand Prix
Last race	1983 50cc San Marino Grand Prix
Starts / Wins / Podiums / Poles / F. laps / Points; 32 / 0 / 6 / 0 / 0

Claudio Lusuardi (born 30 December 1949 in Modena) is an Italian former Grand Prix motorcycle road racer. His best year was in 1982 when he finished in third place in the 50cc world championship, behind Stefan Dörflinger and Eugenio Lazzarini. After retiring from competition, he took on the role of race team manager for Cagiva.
