= Hans Hummel =

Austrian motorcycle racer

- Nationality: (Austria) Austrian
- Born: June 17, 1944
- Died: February 6, 1995 (aged 50)
Motorcycle racing career statistics
Grand Prix motorcycle racing
Active years	1971 - 1977, 1979 - 1984
First race	1971 50cc Austrian Grand Prix
Last race	1984 125cc San Marino Grand Prix
Team	Kreidler
Starts / Wins / Podiums / Poles / F. laps / Points; 54 / 0 / 5 / 0 / 0 / 224

Hans Hummel (17 June 1944 – 6 February 1995) was an Austrian former professional Grand Prix motorcycle road racer. His best year was in 1980, where he finished in third place in the 50cc world championship, behind Eugenio Lazzarini and Stefan Dörflinger.

After his racing career, Hummel became an accomplished engine builder, specializing in two-stroke engines.
