= Patrick Pons =

French motorcycle racer

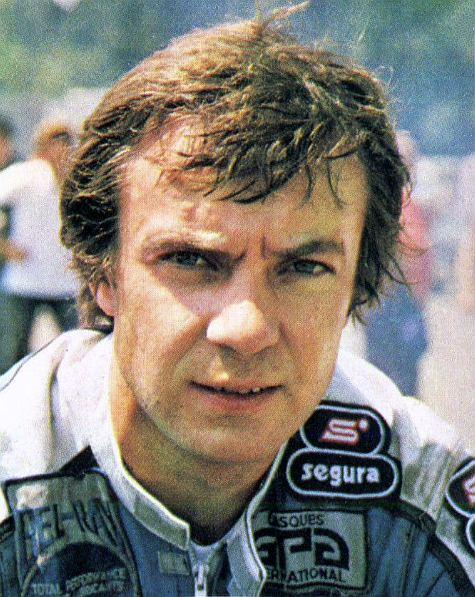
- Patrick Pons (1978).
- Nationality: French
- Born: Patrick Noël Raymond Pons; December 24, 1952; Paris, France
- Died: August 12, 1980 (aged 27); Northampton, United Kingdom
- Bike number: 19
Motorcycle racing career statistics
Grand Prix motorcycle racing
Active years	1973 - 1980
First race	1973 250cc French Grand Prix
Last race	1980 500cc British Grand Prix
Team	Gauloises-Yamaha
Championships	Formula 750 - 1979
Starts / Wins / Podiums / Poles / F. laps / Points; 59 / 0 / 11 / 1 / 0 / 274

Patrick Noël Raymond Pons (24 December 1952 in Paris - 12 August 1980 in Northampton) was a French professional Grand Prix motorcycle road racer. His best year was in 1974 when he finished in third place in the 250cc and the 350cc world championships. Pons became the first Frenchman to win an F.I.M. world championship when he won the 1979 Formula 750 title.

In 1980, Pons won the prestigious Daytona 200. He died two days after suffering a racing accident at the 1980 British Grand Prix, having crashed and then hit by fellow Frenchman Michel Rougerie.

== Grand Prix motorcycle racing results ==
Points system from 1969 onwards:

**Position**	1	2	3	4	5	6	7	8	9	10
**Points**	15	12	10	8	6	5	4	3	2	1

(key) (Races in bold indicate pole position; races in italics indicate fastest lap)

Year	Class	Team	1	2	3	4	5	6	7	8	9	10	11	12	Points	Rank	Wins
1973	250cc	Yamaha	FRA; 9	AUT -	GER -		IOM -	YUG -	NED -	BEL; 6	CZE; 5	SWE; 7	FIN; 7	ESP -	21	11th	0
1973	350cc	Yamaha	FRA -	AUT -	GER -	NAT -	IOM -	YUG -	NED -		CZE; 8	SWE; 8	FIN -	ESP; 3	16	13th	0
1974	250cc	Yamaha		GER -		NAT; 3	IOM -	NED; 4	BEL; 7	SWE; 3	FIN -	CZE; 5	YUG; 2	ESP -	50	3rd	0
1974	350cc	Yamaha	FRA; 4	GER -	AUT; 4	NAT -	IOM -	NED; 3		SWE; 2	FIN; 10		YUG; 4	ESP -	47	3rd	0
1974	500cc	Yamaha	FRA -	GER -	AUT -	NAT -	IOM -	NED -	BEL; 4	SWE -	FIN -	CZE -			8	21st	0
1975	250cc	Yamaha	FRA; 4	ESP; 2		GER; 5	NAT; 5	IOM -	NED; 7	BEL; 10	SWE; 7	FIN; 5	CZE; 5	YUG; 3	48	5th	0
1975	350cc	Yamaha	FRA -	ESP -	AUT; 5	GER -	NAT; 3	IOM -	NED -	BEL -	SWE -	FIN; 3	CZE; 5	YUG -	32	5th	0
1975	500cc	Yamaha	FRA; 5	ESP -	AUT -	GER -	NAT -	IOM -	NED -	BEL -	SWE -	FIN -	CZE -	YUG -	6	20th	0
1976	250cc	Yamaha	FRA; 7		NAT -	YUG; 10	IOM -	NED -	BEL -	SWE; 10	FIN -	CZE -	GER -	ESP -	6	22nd	0
1976	350cc	Yamaha	FRA; Ret	AUT; 9	NAT -	YUG; 7	IOM -	NED; 2			FIN -	CZE -	GER -	ESP -	18	14th	0
1977	250cc	Yamaha	VEN -	GER -	NAT -	ESP -	FRA -	YUG; 10	NED; 12	BEL -	SWE; 13	FIN -	CZE -	GBR; 10	2	33rd	0
1977	350cc	Yamaha	VEN -	GER -	NAT -	ESP; 5	FRA -	YUG -	NED; 10		SWE; 9	FIN; 5	CZE -	GBR -	15	17th	0
1978	350cc	Yamaha	VEN; 5	AUT -	FRA -	NAT -	NED -		SWE -	FIN -	GBR; 10	GER; 9	CZE -	YUG -	9	17th	0
1979	350cc	Yamaha	VEN; 10	AUT; 8	GER -	NAT -	ESP; 5	YUG; 9	NED -	FIN -	GBR -	FRA -	CZE -		12	15th	0
1980	500cc	Yamaha	NAT -	ESP -	FRA; 10	NED; 10	BEL; 8	FIN; 6	GBR -	GER -					10	16th	0
