= Bruno Kneubühler =

Swiss motorcycle racer

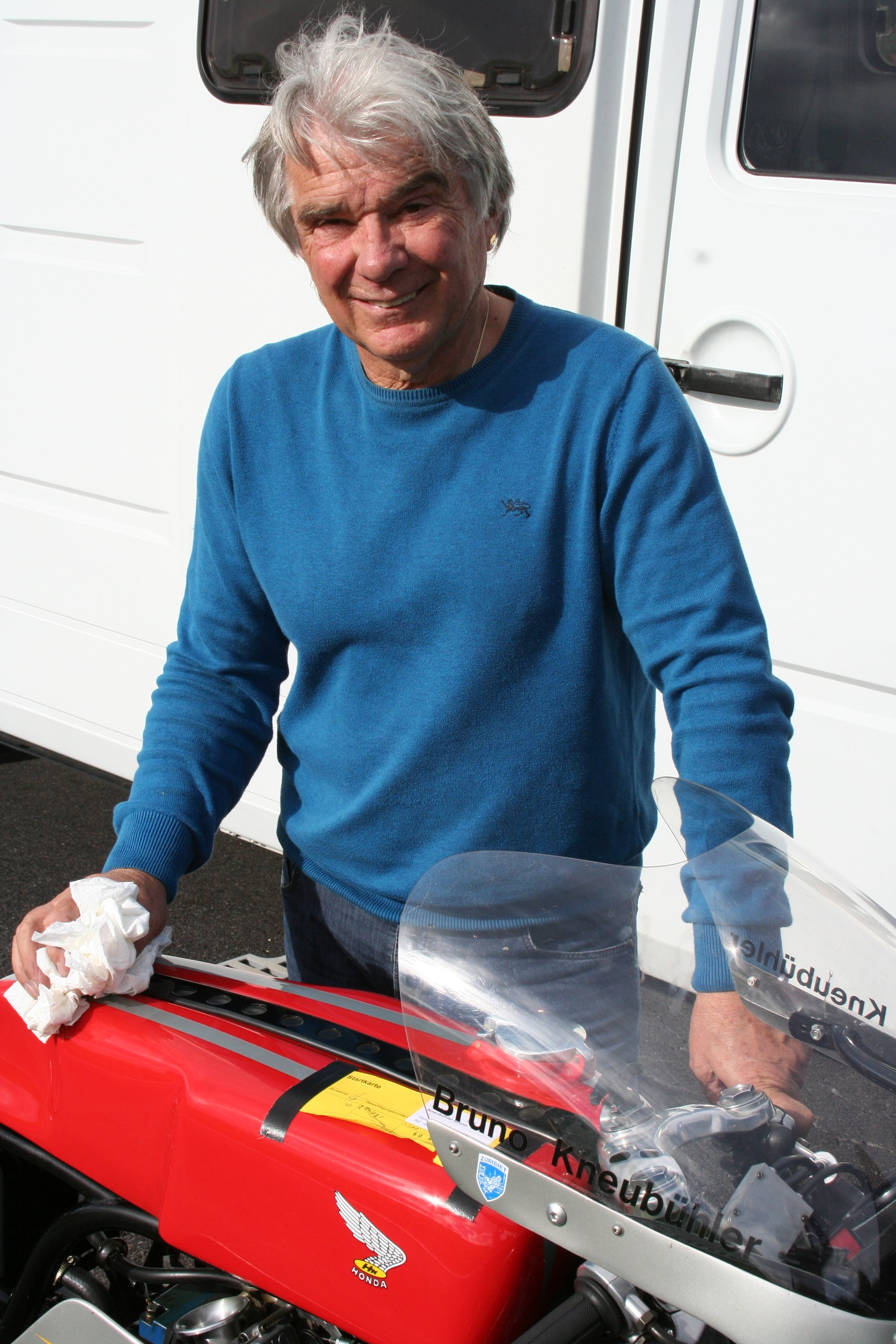
- Kneubühler in 2016
- Nationality: (Switzerland) Swiss
Motorcycle racing career statistics
Grand Prix motorcycle racing
Active years	1972–1989
First race	1972 350cc French Grand Prix
Last race	1989 500cc Czechoslovak Grand Prix
First win	1972 350cc Spanish Grand Prix
Last win	1983 125cc Swedish Grand Prix
Team(s)	Yamaha, Harley-Davidson, Honda
Championships	0
Starts / Wins / Podiums / Poles / F. laps / Points; 173 / 5 / 33 / 5 / 2 / 859

Bruno Kneubühler (born 3 December 1946) is a Swiss former professional Grand Prix motorcycle road racer. He competed in the Grand Prix motorcycle racing world championships from 1972 to 1989. During his career, he competed in every Grand Prix class from 50 cc to 500cc.

== Motorcycle racing career ==
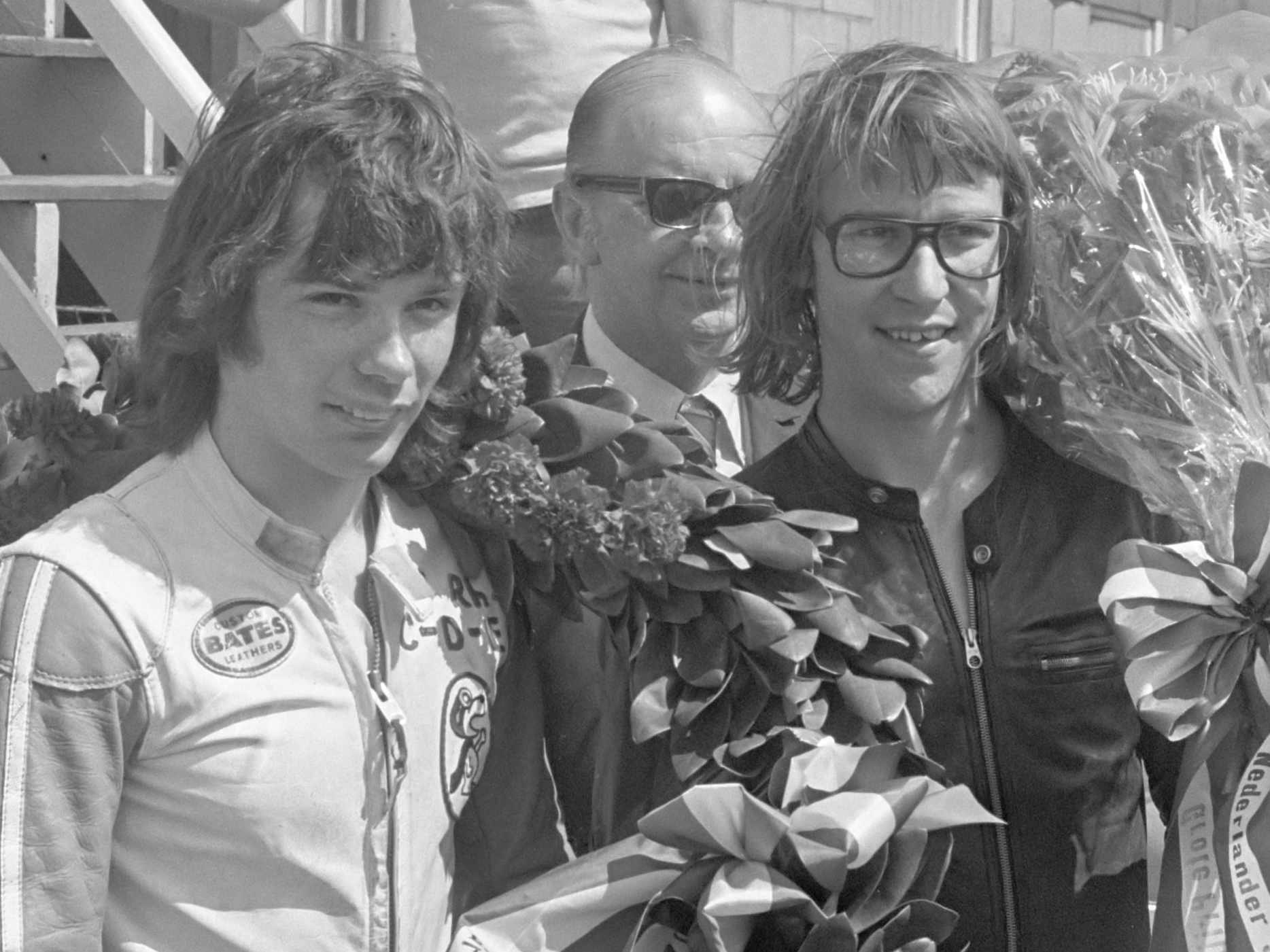
Bruno Kneubühler (L.) and Theo Timmer (1973)

In his first Grand Prix season in 1972, Kneubühler finished the 500cc season in third place behind the dominant MV Agusta factory racing team of Giacomo Agostini and Alberto Pagani. He also won the season-ending 350cc Spanish Grand Prix held on the Montjuich street circuit, finishing ahead of Renzo Pasolini and János Drapál.

A year later, Kneubühler showed his versatility at the 1973 Spanish Grand Prix by scoring second-place finishes in the 50cc, 250cc and 500cc classes. At the 1974 250cc Dutch TT, he scored a second-place finish ahead of third-place finisher and future three-time world champion Kenny Roberts in the American rider's first Grand Prix race. He had his best year in 1983 when he won two Grand Prix races and finished second to Angel Nieto in the 125cc class.

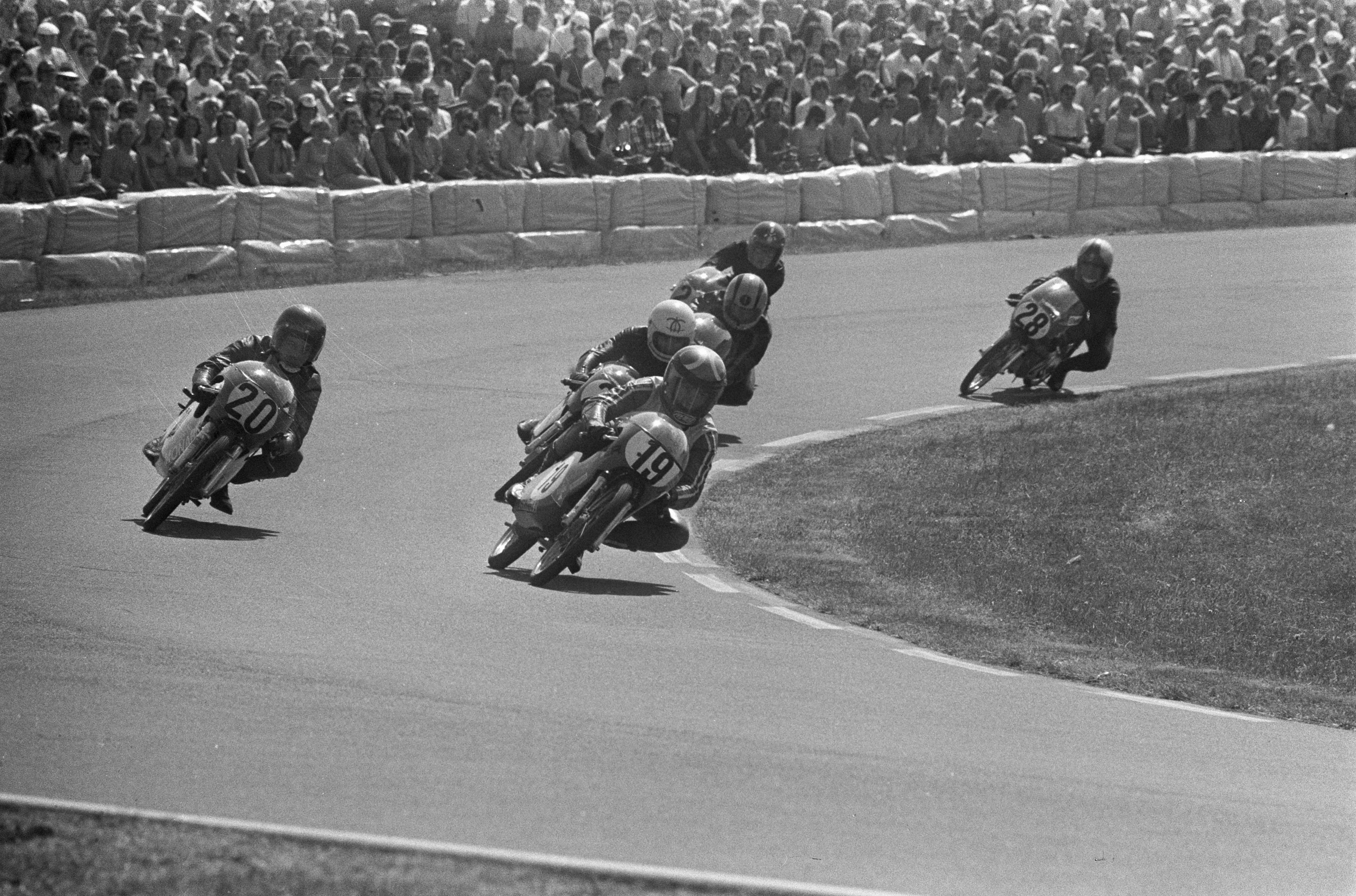
Kneubühler (19) en route to a victory at the 1973 50cc Dutch TT

While he never won a championship, Kneubühler finished in second place three times, winning five Grand Prix races and scoring 33 podium results. He retired in 1989 at the age of 43. His lengthy Grand Prix career saw him compete against many champions from Giacomo Agostini to Mick Doohan. Kneubühler is now back in Classic racing with a Yamaha TZ 350, participating in the International Classic Grand Prix series in races such as 24 Hours of Le Mans.

== Motorcycle Grand Prix results ==
Points system from 1969 to 1987:

**Position**	1	2	3	4	5	6	7	8	9	10
**Points**	15	12	10	8	6	5	4	3	2	1

Points system from 1988 to 1991:

**Position**	1	2	3	4	5	6	7	8	9	10	11	12	13	14	15
**Points**	20	17	15	13	11	10	9	8	7	6	5	4	3	2	1

(key) (Races in bold indicate pole position; races in italics indicate fastest lap)

Year	Class	Team	1	2	3	4	5	6	7	8	9	10	11	12	13	14	15	Points	Rank	Wins
1972	350cc	Yamaha	GER -	FRA; 8	AUT -	NAT -	IOM -	YUG; 5	NED; 9		DDR; 8	CZE; 4	SWE; 9	FIN; 4	ESP; 1			45	6th	1
1972	500cc	Yamaha	GER -	FRA; 4	AUT; 8	NAT; 5	IOM -	YUG -	NED; 3	BEL; 3	DDR; 4	CZE; 3	SWE; 7	FIN -	ESP; 4			54	3rd	0
1973	50cc	Kreidler			GER -	NAT; 2		YUG -	NED; 1	BEL; 2		SWE; 2		ESP; 2				51	2nd	1
1973	250cc	Yamaha	FRA -	AUT -	GER -		IOM -	YUG -	NED -	BEL -	CZE; 8	SWE; 4	FIN; 6	ESP; 2				28	9th	0
1973	350cc	Harley Davidson	FRA; 8	AUT; 10	GER -	NAT -	IOM -	YUG -										5	33rd	0
1973	350cc	Yamaha							NED; 10		CZE -	SWE -	FIN -	ESP -				5	33rd	0
1973	500cc	Yamaha	FRA -	AUT; 9	GER -		IOM -	YUG -	NED -	BEL -	CZE; 3	SWE -	FIN; 3	ESP; 2				34	6th	0
1974	125cc	Yamaha	FRA; 2	GER -	AUT -	NAT -	IOM -	NED; 1	BEL; 3	SWE; 3		CZE; 5	YUG; 6	ESP; 3				63	2nd	1
1974	250cc	Yamaha		GER -		NAT; 2	IOM -	NED; 2	BEL -	SWE -	FIN; 8	CZE; 4	YUG -	ESP; 4				43	5th	0
1974	350cc	Yamaha	FRA; 6	GER -	AUT -	NAT -	IOM -	NED -		SWE -	FIN; 2		YUG -	ESP -				17	12th	0
1975	125cc	Yamaha	FRA -	ESP; 3	AUT; 6	GER; 6	NAT; 6		NED; 3	BEL; 8	SWE; 6		CZE; 4	YUG -				43	6th	0
1975	250cc	Yamaha	FRA -	ESP -		GER; 7	NAT -	IOM -	NED; 4	BEL; 4	SWE -	FIN -	CZE; 9	YUG -				22	9th	0
1975	350cc	Yamaha	FRA -	ESP -	AUT -	GER -	NAT -	IOM -	NED -			FIN; 4	CZE -	YUG -				8	20th	0
1976	250cc	Yamaha	FRA -		NAT; 6	YUG; 6	IOM -	NED; 8	BEL -	SWE; 7	FIN -	TCH; 5	GER; 5	ESP -				29	8th	0
1976	350cc	Yamaha	FRA -	AUT -	NAT -	YUG; 4	IOM -	NED; 4			FIN; 5	TCH -	GER; 9	ESP; 5				28	7th	0
1977	250cc	Yamaha	VEN -	GER -	NAT -	ESP; 10	FRA; 6	YUG -	NED -	BEL -	SWE -	FIN -	TCH -	GBR -				6	26th	0
1977	350cc	Yamaha	VEN -	GER -	NAT; 5	ESP; 4	FRA; 3	YUG -	NED -		SWE -	FIN -	TCH -	GBR -				24	11th	0
1978	500cc	Suzuki	VEN -	ESP -	AUT; 10	FRA -	NAT -	NED -	BEL -	SWE -	FIN; 10	GBR -	GER -					2	29th	0
1979	125cc	MBA	VEN -	AUT; 10	GER -	NAT; 4	ESP -	YUG; 5	**NED**; 5	BEL -	SWE -	FIN -	GBR; 9	CZE; 6	FRA; 4			36	9th	0
1980	125cc	MBA	NAT; 3	ESP; 3	FRA -	YUG; 4	NED; 7	BEL; 8	FIN; 4	GBR; 2	CZE; 4	GER; 6						68	4th	0
1981	250cc	Rotax	ARG -	GER; 8	NAT -	FRA -	ESP -	NED -	BEL -	RSM -	GBR -	FIN; 9	SWE -	CZE -				5	27th	0
1982	125cc	MBA	ARG -	AUT -	FRA -	ESP; 7	NAT; 7	NED -	BEL -	YUG -	GBR; 9	SWE; 7	FIN -	CZE; 7	RSM -	GER -		18	15th	0
1983	125cc	MBA	FRA; 7	NAT; 5	GER; 4	ESP; 5	AUT; NC	YUG; 1	NED; 3	BEL; NC	GBR; 2	SWE; 1	RSM; NC					76	2nd	2
1984	125cc	MBA	NAT; 6	ESP; 9	GER; 9	FRA; 5	NED; 7	**GBR**; 4	SWE; NC	RSM; NC								27	10th	0
1985	125cc	LCR	ESP; 6	GER; 7	NAT; 4	AUT; 5	NED; 6	BEL; 2	FRA; 3	GBR; NC	SWE; NC	RSM; 4						58	5th	0
1986	125cc	MBA	ESP -	NAT -	GER; 4	AUT; 3	NED; 5	BEL -	FRA; 4	GBR -	SWE; 4	RSM; 4	BWU; 5					54	5th	0
1987	500cc	Honda	JPN -	ESP; 18	GER; 11	NAT; 14	AUT; NC	YUG; 15	NED; 21	FRA; NC	GBR; 17	SWE; 14	TCH; NC	RSM; 15	POR; 11	BRA -	ARG -	0	-	0
1988	500cc	Honda	JPN -	USA -	ESP; 15	EXP; 14	NAT; 19	GER; 25	AUT; 12	NED; 17	BEL; 25	YUG; 15	FRA; NC	GBR; NC	SWE; 20	TCH; 15	BRA; NC	9	22nd	0
1989	500cc	Honda	JPN -	AUS -	USA; 14	ESP; 16	NAT; DNS	GER; 15	AUT; 15	YUG; 16	NED; 16	BEL; 17	FRA; 17	GBR; 18	SWE; 14	TCH; 18	BRA -	6	34th	0
