= John Dodds (motorcyclist) =

Australian motorcycle racer (1943–2024)

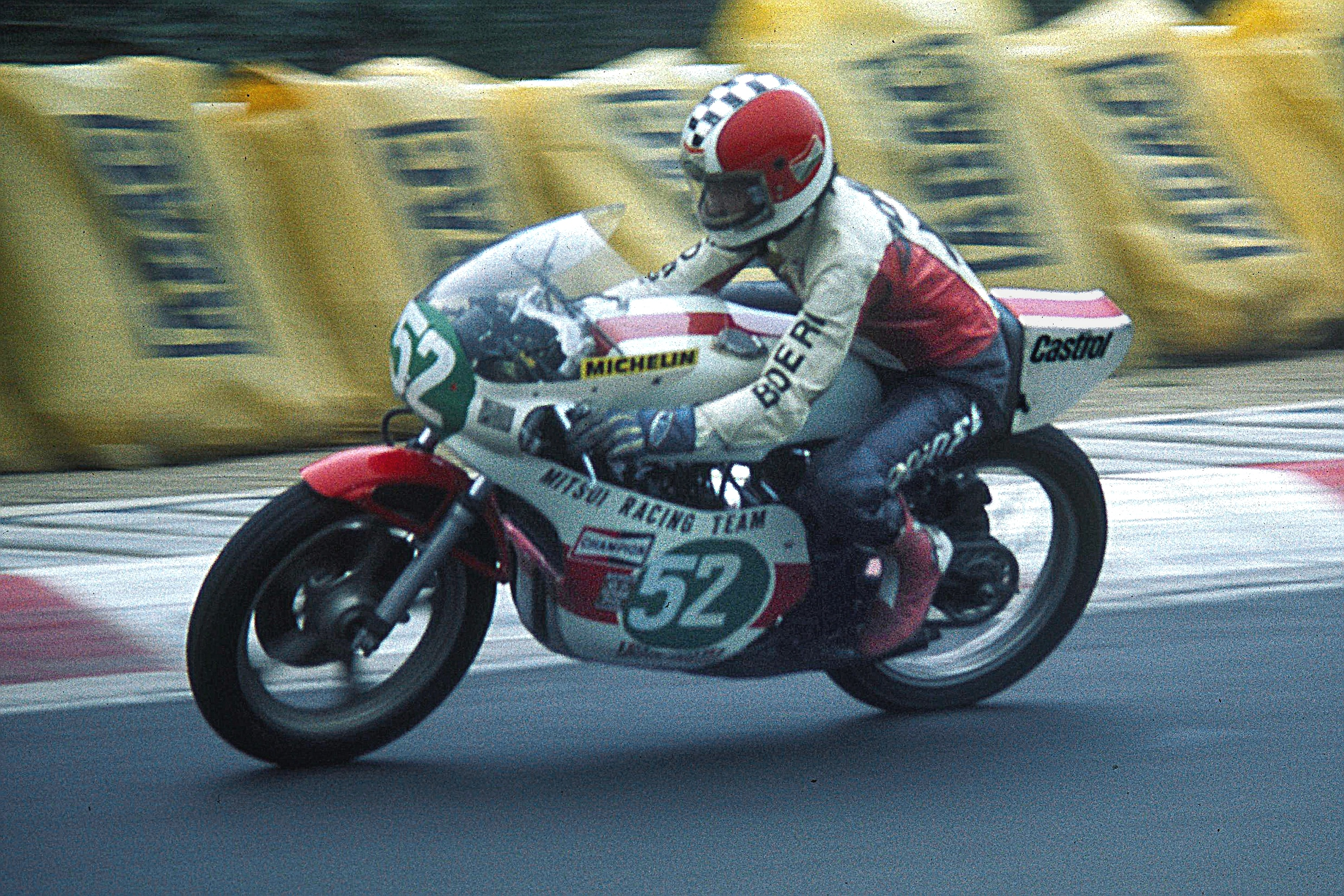
- John Dodds on the Nürburgring in 1976
- Nationality: (Australia) Australian
- Born: November 13, 1943; Brisbane, Australia
- Died: January 31, 2024 (aged 80); Brisbane, Australia
Motorcycle racing career statistics
Grand Prix motorcycle racing
Active years	1966–1978
First race	1966 500cc West German Grand Prix
Last race	1978 250cc German Grand Prix
First win	1970 125cc West German Grand Prix
Last win	1974 250cc Spanish Grand Prix
Team(s)	Aermacchi, Yamaha
Championships	Formula 750 - 1974
Starts / Wins / Podiums / Poles / F. laps / Points; 70 / 4 / 21 / 1 / 4 / 448

John Dodds (13 November 1943 – 31 January 2024) was an Australian Grand Prix motorcycle road racer. He competed on the Grand Prix circuit from 1966 to 1978. His best finish was a third place behind Dieter Braun and Teuvo Länsivuori in the 1973 250cc world championship. Dodds died in Brisbane on 31 January 2024, at the age of 80.

== Motorcycle racing career ==
Dodds won his first world championship Grand Prix at the 1970 125cc West German Grand Prix held in rainy conditions at the challenging, 14.2 miles (22.9 km) long Nürburgring racetrack, riding a single-cylinder Aermacchi motorcycle.

During the 1971 season, Dodds helped fellow racer Kim Newcombe develop a motorcycle using a two-stroke outboard motor designed by Dieter König. Newcombe and the König were the first to challenge the dominance of the MV Agustas after the departure of Honda from Grand Prix competition at the end of the 1967 season.

Dodds competed in the inaugural Formula 750 European championship in 1973, finishing second at the challenging Clermont-Ferrand circuit, then won the final round at the Montjuïc circuit to finish the season ranked second in the championship behind Barry Sheene. In 1974, he won the preseason invitational 500cc Mettet Grand Prix and then, claimed the 1974 Formula 750 season world championship on a Yamaha TZ 350.

== Motorcycle Grand Prix results ==
Points system from 1950 to 1968:

Position	1	2	3	4	5	6
Points	8	6	4	3	2	1

Points system from 1969 onwards:

Position	1	2	3	4	5	6	7	8	9	10
Points	15	12	10	8	6	5	4	3	2	1

(key) (Races in italics indicate fastest lap)

Year	Class	Team	1	2	3	4	5	6	7	8	9	10	11	12	13	Points	Rank	Wins
1966	250cc	Cotton	ESP -	GER -	FRA -	NED -	BEL -	DDR -	CZE -	FIN -	ULS -	IOM; RET	NAT -	JPN -		0	-	0
1966	500cc	Norton		GER; RET		NED -	BEL; 13	DDR; 6	CZE; 10	FIN -	ULS; RET	IOM; RET	NAT; RET			1	20th	0
1967	500cc	Norton	GER; RET	IOM -	NED; 10	BEL; 8	DDR; 4	CZE; 6	FIN; 9	ULS -	NAT; RET	CAN -				4	13th	0
1968	500cc	Norton	GER; RET	ESP; 3	IOM; RET	NED; RET	BEL; 10	DDR; RET	CZE; RET	FIN; 5	ULS -	NAT; 8				6	14th	0
1969	125cc	Aermacchi	ESP -	GER -	FRA -	IOM -	NED; 6	BEL; 11	DDR -	CZE -	FIN -		NAT; 9	YUG -		7	25th	0
1969	500cc	Librenti	ESP -	GER; 4	FRA; RET	IOM -	NED -	BEL; RET	DDR -	CZE -	FIN; RET	ULS -	NAT; 3	YUG; RET		18	11th	0
1970	125cc	Aermacchi	GER; 1	FRA; RET	YUG -	IOM -	NED; RET	BEL; 7	DDR -	CZE -	FIN; RET		NAT -	ESP; 6		24	8th	1
1970	500cc	Librenti	GER; RET	FRA -	YUG -	IOM -	NED; RET	BEL; RET	DDR; 2		FIN; RET	ULS; DNQ	NAT -	ESP; RET		12	15th	0
1971	250cc	Yamaha	AUT; RET	GER; 3	IOM -	NED; 7	BEL; 2	DDR -	CZE -	SWE; 7	FIN; 2	ULS -	NAT; 2	ESP; 6		59	4th	0
1971	500cc	König	AUT; RET	GER; 10	IOM -	NED; RET	BEL; RET	DDR; RET		SWE -	FIN -	ULS; RET	NAT; RET	ESP -		1	49th	0
1972	250cc	Yamaha	GER; 5	FRA; RET	AUT; 3	NAT; 6	IOM -	YUG; 4	NED -	BEL; 5	DDR -	CZE; 7	SWE; 8	FIN; RET	ESP -	42	6th	0
1972	350cc	Yamaha	GER -	FRA; RET	AUT -	NAT -	IOM -	YUG -	NED -		DDR -	CZE; 9	SWE -	FIN; 6	ESP -	8	22nd	0
1973	250cc	Yamaha	FRA; 10	AUT; 5	GER; RET		IOM -	YUG; 7	NED; 3	BEL; 2	CZE; 6	SWE; RET	FIN; 3	ESP; 1		58	3rd	1
1973	350cc	Yamaha	FRA; RET	AUT; RET	GER; RET	NAT; 4	IOM -	YUG; 3	NED; 4	BEL -	CZE; 6	SWE; 4	FIN; 3	ESP -		49	4th	0
1974	250cc	Yamaha		GER -		NAT; DNS	IOM; RET	NED; 5	BEL; 4	SWE; RET	FIN; 6	CZE; 7	YUG -	ESP; 1		38	7th	1
1974	350cc	Yamaha	FRA; 10	GER -	AUT; RET	NAT -	IOM -	NED; RET	BEL -	SWE; 8	FIN; 1		YUG; 2	ESP; RET		31	4th	1
1975	250cc	Yamaha	FRA -	ESP -		GER -	NAT -	IOM -	NED -	BEL -	SWE -	FIN; 6	CZE; 7	YUG -		9	19th	0
1975	350cc	Yamaha	FRA -	ESP -	AUT -	GER -	NAT -	IOM -	NED -			FIN; 10	CZE -	YUG -		1	47th	0
1976	250cc	Yamaha	FRA; 11		NAT; RET	YUG -	IOM -	NED; 3	BEL; 4	SWE; RET	FIN; 7	CZE; 9	GER; 17	ESP; 14		24	11th	0
1976	350cc	Yamaha	FRA; 10	AUT; 3	NAT; 3	YUG; RET	IOM -	NED; 5			FIN; 9	CZE; 6	GER; RET	ESP; RET		34	5th	0
1977	250cc	Yamaha	VEN -		GER; 18	NAT; 18	ESP; DNQ	FRA; 10	YUG; 4	NED; DNQ	BEL -	SWE -	FIN; 18	CZE; 13	GBR -	9	22nd	0
1977	350cc	Yamaha	VEN -		GER; RET	NAT -	ESP; RET	FRA; 6	YUG; 5	NED -		SWE -	FIN; RET	CZE -	GBR; 12	11	20th	0
1978	250cc	Yamaha	VEN -	ESP -		FRA; RET	NAT -	NED; RET	BEL; RET	SWE; RET	FIN; 9	GBR -	GER; 20	CZE -	YUG -	2	24th	0
