= 1977 French motorcycle Grand Prix =

(France) 1977 French Grand Prix
Race details
- Race 6 of 13 races in the 1977 Grand Prix motorcycle racing season
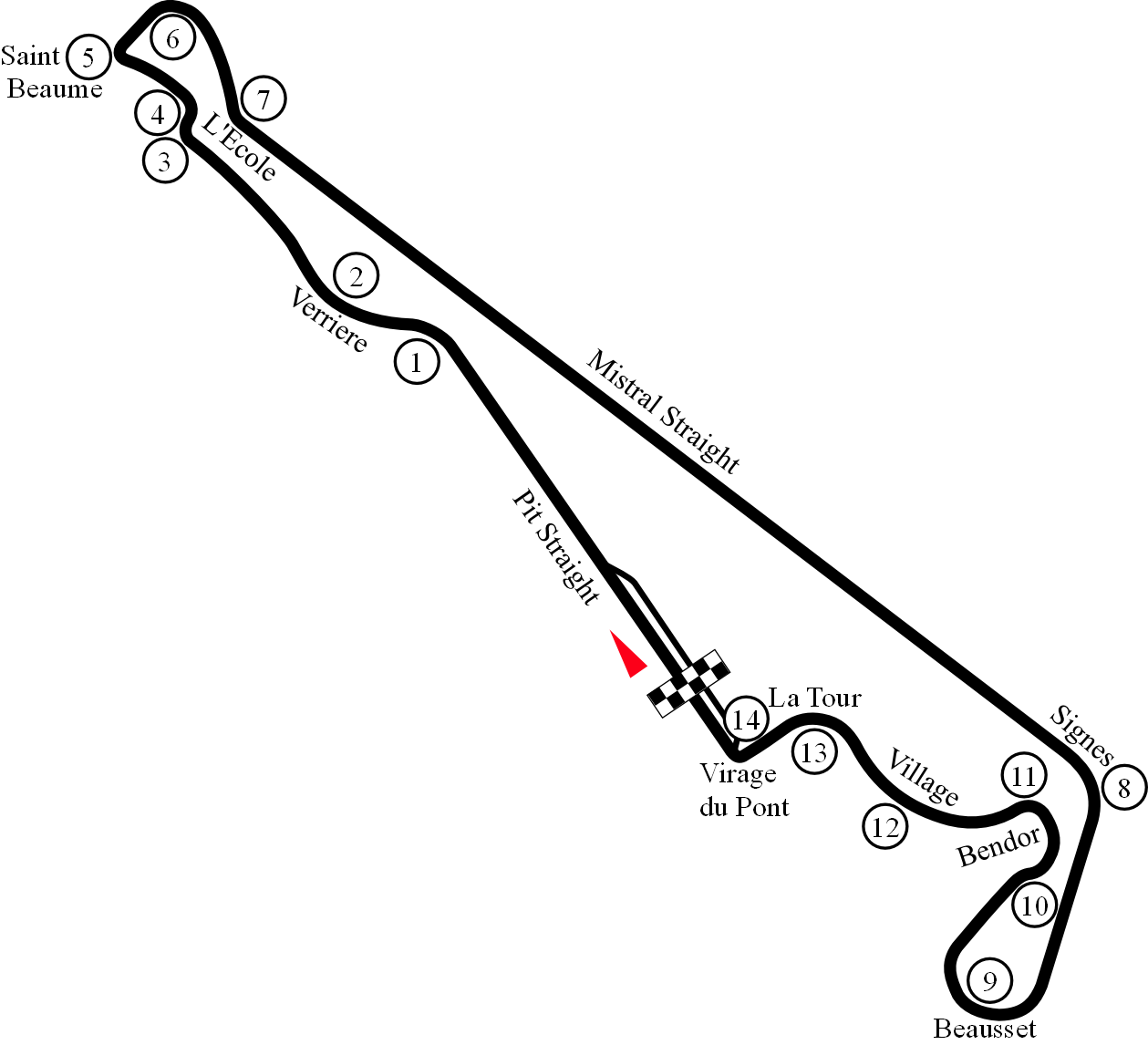
- Date: 29 May 1977
- Official name: Grand Prix de France Moto
- Location: Circuit Paul Ricard
- Course: Permanent racing facility; 5.810 km (3.610 mi)

500cc
Pole position
- Rider: (United States) Steve Baker
- Time: 2:09.060
Fastest lap
- Rider: (Italy) Giacomo Agostini
- Time: 2:08.320
Podium
- First: (United Kingdom) Barry Sheene
- Second: (Italy) Giacomo Agostini
- Third: (United States) Steve Baker

350cc
Pole position
- Rider: (South Africa) Jon Ekerold
- Time: 2:15.360
Fastest lap
- Rider: (Japan) Takazumi Katayama
- Time: 2:13.390
Podium
- First: (Japan) Takazumi Katayama
- Second: (South Africa) Jon Ekerold
- Third: (Switzerland) Bruno Kneubühler

250cc
Pole position
- Rider: (United Kingdom) Barry Ditchburn
- Time: 2:16.920
Fastest lap
- Rider: (South Africa) Alan North
- Time: 2:17.270
Podium
- First: (South Africa) Jon Ekerold
- Second: (South Africa) Alan North
- Third: (Australia) Vic Soussan

125cc
Pole position
- Rider: (Italy) Pierpaolo Bianchi
- Time: 2:24.550
Fastest lap
- Rider: (Italy) Pierpaolo Bianchi
- Time: 2:21.800
Podium
- First: (Italy) Pierpaolo Bianchi
- Second: (Italy) Eugenio Lazzarini
- Third: (Austria) Harald Bartol

Sidecar (B2A)
Pole position
- Rider: (Switzerland) Rolf Biland
- Passenger: (United Kingdom) Ken Williams
- Time: 2:17.550
Fastest lap
- Rider: (France) Alain Michel
- Passenger: (France) Gérard Lacorre
- Time: 2:19.920
Podium
- First rider: (France) Alain Michel
- First passenger: (France) Gérard Lacorre
- Second rider: (United Kingdom) George O'Dell
- Second passenger: (United Kingdom) Kenny Arthur
- Third rider: (West Germany) Helmut Schilling
- Third passenger: (West Germany) Rainer Gundel

The 1977 French motorcycle Grand Prix was the sixth round of the 1977 Grand Prix motorcycle racing season. It took place on 29 May 1977 at Circuit Paul Ricard.

== 500cc classification ==
Pos.	No.	Rider	Team	Manufacturer	Time/Retired	Points
1	7	(United Kingdom) Barry Sheene	Texaco Heron Team Suzuki	Suzuki	48'00.730	15
2	8	(Italy) Giacomo Agostini	Team API Marlboro	Yamaha	+3.340	12
3	32	(United States) Steve Baker	Yamaha Motor Company	Yamaha	+15.640	10
4	17	(Italy) Gianfranco Bonera	Team Nava Olio Fiat	Suzuki	+18.170	8
5	6	(Switzerland) Philippe Coulon	Marlboro Masche Total	Suzuki	+19.740	6
6	12	(United Kingdom) Steve Parrish	Texaco Heron Team Suzuki	Suzuki	+23.770	5
7	2	(Finland) Teuvo Länsivuori	Life Racing Team	Suzuki	+30.480	4
8	16	(Italy) Virginio Ferrari	Team Nava Olio Fiat	Suzuki	+30.680	3
9	19	(Italy) Armando Toracca	MC della Robbia	Suzuki	+40.890	2
10	3	(United States) Pat Hennen	Texaco Heron Team Suzuki	Suzuki	+55.550	1
11	15	(France) Christian Estrosi	Marlboro Masche Total	Suzuki	+1'00.250	
12	18	(Netherlands) Boet van Dulmen	Pullshaw	Suzuki	+1'10.770	
13	11	(Australia) Warren Willing		Yamaha	+1'12.950	
14	20	(New Zealand) John Woodley		Suzuki	+1'55.220	
15	68	(Italy) Giovanni Rolando		Suzuki	+2'07.590	
16	77	(Belgium) Jean-Philippe Orban	Jean-Philippe Orban Racing Team	Suzuki	+1 lap	
17	43	(West Germany) Helmut Kassner	Boeri Giudici Racing Team	Suzuki	+1 lap	
18	35	(Finland) Markku Matikainen	Länsivuori Team	Suzuki	+1 lap	
19	73	(Spain) Carlos Delgado de San Antonio		Suzuki	+1 lap	
Ret	23	(United Kingdom) Alex George	Hermetite Racing International	Suzuki	Retired	
Ret	9	(United Kingdom) John Williams	Team Appleby Glade	Suzuki	Retired	
Ret	36	(Italy) Graziano Rossi		Suzuki	Retired	
Ret	??	(France) Hervé Moineau		Suzuki	Retired	
Ret	42	(New Zealand) Stuart Avant	Sid Griffiths Racing	Suzuki	Retired	
Ret	??	(Italy) Nico Cereghini	Life Racing Team	Suzuki	Retired	
Ret	??	(France) Bernard Fau		Suzuki	Retired	
Ret	4	(Italy) Marco Lucchinelli	Life Racing Team	Suzuki	Retired	
Ret	??	(France) Michel Rougerie		Suzuki	Retired	
Ret	??	(France) Claude Ben El Hadj		Suzuki	Retired	
Ret	45	(Netherlands) Wil Hartog	Riemersma Racing	Suzuki	Retired	
Ret	??	(Denmark) Børge Nielsen		Suzuki	Retired	
Ret	26	(West Germany) Anton Mang	Valvoline Racing Hamburg	Suzuki	Retired	
Ret	??	(Austria) Karl Auer	MSC Rottenberg	Suzuki	Retired	
Ret	28	(Austria) Max Wiener	MSC Rottenberg	Suzuki	Retired	
Ret	28	(France) André Pogolotti		Suzuki	Retired	
Ret	5	(United Kingdom) John Newbold	Maurice Newbold	Suzuki	Retired	
DNS	5	(France) Daniel Rouge	Maurice Newbold	Suzuki	Did not start	

== 350 cc classification ==
Pos	No.	Rider	Manufacturer	Laps	Time	Grid	Points
1	8	(Japan) Takazumi Katayama	Yamaha	22	49:23.00	2	15
2	23	(South Africa) Jon Ekerold	Yamaha	22	+24.77	1	12
3	7	(Switzerland) Bruno Kneubühler	Yamaha	22	+44.44	6	10
4	36	(Australia) Vic Soussan	Yamaha	22	+48.49	3	8
5	24	(Finland) Eero Hyvärinen	Yamaha	22	+48.78	9	6
6	5	(Australia) John Dodds	Yamaha	22	+49.80	7	5
7	4	(United Kingdom) Tom Herron	Yamaha	22	+54.68	10	4
8	9	(France) Olivier Chevallier	Yamaha	22	+1:04.55	11	3
9	32	(Finland) Pekka Nurmi	Yamaha	22	+1:04.97		2
10		(United Kingdom) John Newbold	Yamaha	22	+1:13.71		1
11	11	(Italy) Giacomo Agostini	Yamaha	22	+1:38.90		
12	124	(France) Jean-Claude Hogrel	Yamaha	22	+2:04.15		
13	100	(Denmark) Børge Nielsen	Yamaha	22	+2:09.55		
14	125	(France) Thierry Espié	Yamaha	22	+2:20.82		
15	71	(Germany) Helmut Kassner	Yamaha	22	+3:05.02	13	
16		(France) Bernard Fau	Yamaha	21	+1 lap	12	
17	120	(Japan) Ken Nemoto	Yamaha	21	+1 lap	15	
18	25	(France) Pierre Soulas	Yamaha	21	+1 lap		
19	44	(France) Roland Faesser	Yamaha	21	+1 lap		
20	126	(France) Pierre Tocco	Yamaha	21	+1 lap		
		(France) Patrick Pons	Yamaha			4	
		(South Africa) Alan North	Yamaha			5	
		(France) Eric Saul	Yamaha			8	
		(Italy) Vanes Francini	Yamaha			14	
38 starters in total

== 250 cc classification ==
Pos	No.	Rider	Manufacturer	Laps	Time	Grid	Points
1	30	(South Africa) Jon Ekerold	Yamaha	20	46:29.19	17	15
2	148	(South Africa) Alan North	Yamaha	20	+6.05	11	12
3	33	(Australia) Vic Soussan	Yamaha	20	+6.70	8	10
4	167	(Italy) Mario Lega	Morbidelli	20	+7.12	21	8
5	27	(France) Guy Bertin	Yamaha	20	+16.86	10	6
6	8	(Switzerland) Bruno Kneubühler	Yamaha	20	+19.78	25	5
7	5	(United Kingdom) Tom Herron	Yamaha	20	+22.99	6	4
8	2	(Japan) Takazumi Katayama	Yamaha	20	+24.63	2	3
9	112	(Finland) Eero Hyvärinen	Yamaha	20	+34.16	9	2
10	31	(Australia) John Dodds	Yamaha	20	+38.71	12	1
11	28	(France) Eric Saul	Yamaha	20	+39.75		
12	9	(France) Olivier Chevallier	Yamaha	20	+40.17	14	
13	32	(Finland) Pekka Nurmi	Yamaha	20	+46.99		
14	21	(France) Jean-Claude Hogrel	Yamaha	20	+1:10.46		
15	100	(United Kingdom) Clive Horton	Yamaha	20	+1:10.76		
16	113	(France) Alain Beraud	Yamaha	20	+1:11.43		
17	107	(France) Pascal Renaudet	Harley-Davidson	20	+1:31.37		
18	70	(France) Roland Faesser	Yamaha	20	+1:31.66		
19	164	(Italy) Franco Solaroli	Harley-Davidson	20	+1:33.04		
20	106	(Japan) Ken Nemoto	Yamaha	20	+1:42.74		
		(United Kingdom) Barry Ditchburn	Kawasaki			1	
		(Japan) Akihiko Kiyohara	Kawasaki			3	
		(France) Christian Sarron	Yamaha			4	
		(Venezuela) Aldo Nannini	Yamaha			5	
		(Switzerland) Michel Frutschi	Yamaha			7	
		(Italy) Franco Uncini	Harley-Davidson			13	
		(United Kingdom) Mick Grant	Kawasaki			15	
36 starters in total, 24 finishers

== 125 cc classification ==
Pos	No.	Rider	Manufacturer	Laps	Time	Grid	Points
1	1	(Italy) Pierpaolo Bianchi	Morbidelli	18	43:08.68	1	15
2	8	(Italy) Eugenio Lazzarini	Morbidelli	18	+17.34	2	12
3	63	(Austria) Harald Bartol	Morbidelli	18	+1:16.57	3	10
4	7	(Germany) Gert Bender	Bender	18	+1:47.51	13	8
5	6	(France) Jean-Louis Guignabodet	Morbidelli	18	+1:48.88	8	6
6	19	(Italy) Giovanni Ziggiotto	Morbidelli	18	+1:50.81	7	5
7	65	(Italy) Sauro Pazzaglia	Morbidelli	18	+1:51.35	14	4
8	10	(Belgium) Julien van Zeebroeck	Morbidelli	18	+2:03.09	9	3
9		(Italy) Maurizio Massimiani	Morbidelli	18	+2:03.72	17	2
10	52	(Italy) Pierluigi Conforti	Morbidelli	18	+2:07.34	6	1
11	49	(Germany) Walter Koschine	Morbidelli	18	+2:23.58		
12	58	(France) Yves Dupont	Morbidelli	18	+2:27.29	10	
13	43	(Finland) Matti Kinnunen	Morbidelli	17	+1 lap	4	
14	48	(France) Thierry Noblesse	Morbidelli	17	+1 lap		
15	24	(France) François Granon	Maico	17	+1 lap		
16	17	(Italy) Enrico Cereda	Morbidelli	17	+1 lap		
17	56	(France) Patrick Herouard	Morbidelli	17	+1 lap		
18	78	(Germany) Horst Seel	Seel	17	+1 lap		
19	70	(Austria) Ernst Fagerer	Morbidelli	17	+1 lap		
20	45	(France) Laurent Gomis	Morbidelli	17	+1 lap		
		(Germany) Anton Mang	Morbidelli			5	
		(Italy) Pieraldo Cipriani	Morbidelli			11	
		(Sweden) Per-Edward Carlsson	Morbidelli			12	
		(Switzerland) Stefan Dörflinger	Morbidelli			15	
38 starters in total, 27 finishers

== Sidecar classification ==
Pos	No.	Rider	Passenger	Manufacturer	Laps	Time	Grid	Points
1	9	(France) Alain Michel	(France) Gérard Lecorre	Yamaha	18	42:35.36	2	15
2	8	(United Kingdom) George O'Dell	(United Kingdom) Kenny Arthur	Seymaz-Yamaha	18	+35.56	3	12
3	6	(Germany) Helmut Schilling	(Germany) Rainer Gundel	Aro	18	+44.71	6	10
4	3	(Switzerland) Hermann Schmid	(Switzerland) Jean-Petit Matille	Schmid-Yamaha	18	+48.00	4	8
5	31	(Sweden) Göte Brodin	(Sweden) Bengt Forsberg	Windle-Yamaha	18	+48.31	8	6
6	5	(Germany) Siegfried Schauzu	(Germany) Wolfgang Kalauch	Yamaha	18	+2:07.59		5
7	20	(Switzerland) Jean-François Monnin	(Switzerland) Edouard Weber	Seymaz-Yamaha	18	+2:10.29		4
8	29	(France) Yvan Trolliet	(France) Pierre Muller	Yamaha	18	+2:14.78	10	3
9	7	(United Kingdom) Dick Greasley	(United Kingdom) Mick Skeels	Chell-Yamaha	18	+2:19.35		2
10	51	(Germany) Max Venus	(Germany) Norman Bittermann	König	18	+2:25.43	11	1
11		(France) Michel Chevassier	(France) Max Gross	Yamaha	17	+1 lap		
12	18	(Switzerland) Hans-Peter Hubacher	(Switzerland) Pudu Dubach	Yamaha	17	+1 lap		
13	14	(Germany) Ted Janssen	(Germany) Erich Schmitz	Colyam	17	+1 lap		
14	52	(Austria) Herbert Prügl	(Austria) Hans Kussberger	Rotax	17	+1 lap		
15	33	(Belgium) Marc Alexandre	(Belgium) Paul Gerard	Kova-König	17	+1 lap		
		(Switzerland) Rolf Biland	(United Kingdom) Kenny Williams	Schmid-Yamaha			1	
		(Switzerland) Bruno Holzer	(Switzerland) Charly Meierhans	LCR-Yamaha			5	
		(Switzerland) Ernst Trachsel	(Switzerland) "Agner"	Schmid-Yamaha			7	
		(Germany) Werner Schwärzel	(Germany) Andreas Huber	Aro			9	
28 starters in total, 21 finishers

Previous race: 1977 Spanish Grand Prix	FIM Grand Prix World Championship; 1977 season	Next race: 1977 Yugoslavian Grand Prix
Previous race: 1976 French Grand Prix	French Grand Prix	Next race: 1978 French Grand Prix
