= John Williams (motorcyclist) =

British motorcycle racer

- Nationality: English
Motorcycle racing career statistics
Grand Prix motorcycle racing
Active years	1968 – 1978
First race	1968 500cc Isle of Man TT
Last race	1978 500cc British Grand Prix
First win	1976 500cc Belgian Grand Prix
Last win	1976 500cc Belgian Grand Prix
Team	Suzuki
Championships	0
Starts / Wins / Podiums / Poles / F. laps / Points; 33 / 1 / 8 / 0 / 1 / 141

John Glen Williams (27 May 1946 – 12 August 1978) was an English motorcycle short-circuit road racer who also entered selected Grands Prix on the near-continent. He mostly raced as a "privateer" having a personal sponsor, Gerald Brown. Williams died in Northern Ireland, following an accident when racing at an event held on closed public roads near Dundrod.

== Career ==
Williams began racing in 1966, and won the Stars of Tomorrow meeting at Brands Hatch in 1968 on a 250 cc Ducati. He turned professional in 1973, and won the 250, 350 and 500 cc classes at that year's Ulster Grand Prix, the first rider to win three Ulster GP races in a single day. In 1974 he won the 350cc, 500cc and 750cc classes at the North West 200, marking the first time a competitor had won three classes at the event. He also raced for Honda in endurance events such as the Bol d'Or.

Williams' best season was in 1975 when he finished in fifth place in the 500 cc world championship on a Yamaha motorcycle. His performance earned him a contract to race for the British Heron-Suzuki team in the 1976 500cc World Championship alongside teammates Barry Sheene and John Newbold. The Suzuki factory allocated three Suzuki RG 500 motorcycles for the British team in 1976, ostensibly one motorcycle for each of their riders however, Sheene appropriated all three motorcycles for himself, which created animosity between Sheene and his teammates as they had to compete with the team's 1975 RG 500s.

Williams led the 1976 Senior TT by over one minute after setting a new outright lap record for the course at 112.27 mph (181 km/h) when his Suzuki broke down one mile from the finish line, allowing Tom Herron (Yamaha) to take the victory. Williams pushed his motorcycle across the finish line in seventh place. He won the only World Championship race of his career when he defeated Sheene at the 1976 Belgian Grand Prix.

Williams turned down the offer of a place on the Heron-Suzuki team in 1977, preferring to race as a privateer, although well-publicised differences between himself and Barry Sheene may have been a contributing factor. Williams was named as Sports Personality of the Year for 1976 by the Liverpool Echo.

Williams was a five-time winner of the North West 200 race in Northern Ireland and a four-time winner at the Isle of Man TT.

Williams won the 500 cc race in the 1978 Ulster Grand Prix but died from injuries sustained after crashing at Wheeler's Corner in the inaugural TT Formula One event later that same day. He was a resident of Heswall, a town on the Wirral, Merseyside, England.

== John Williams Trophy ==
The John Williams Trophy is an annual award at the Isle of Man TT Races. It is presented to the rider who completes the fastest lap in the Superbike TT race.

== Motorcycle Grand Prix results ==
Points system from 1969 onwards:

**Position**	1	2	3	4	5	6	7	8	9	10
**Points**	15	12	10	8	6	5	4	3	2	1

(key) (Races in bold indicate pole position; races in italics indicate fastest lap)

Year	Class	Team	1	2	3	4	5	6	7	8	9	10	11	12	13	Points	Rank	Wins
1968	500cc	Matchless	GER -	ESP -	IOM; 11	NED -	BEL -	DDR -	CZE -	FIN -	ULS -	NAT -				0	–	0
1969	350cc	AJS	ESP -	GER -		IOM; 15	NED -		DDR -	CZE -	FIN -	ULS -	NAT -	YUG -		0	–	0
1969	500cc	Metisse	ESP -	GER -	FRA -	IOM -	NED -	BEL -	DDR -	CZE -	FIN -	ULS; 8	NAT -	YUG -		3	46th	0
1970	500cc	Matchless	GER -	FRA -	YUG -	IOM; 5	NED -	BEL -	DDR -	FIN -	ULS; 9	NAT -	ESP -			8	23rd	0
1971	350cc	AJS	AUT -	GER -	IOM; 4	NED -		DDR -	CZE -	SWE -	FIN -	ULS; 4	NAT -	ESP -		16	13th	0
1971	500cc	AJS	AUT -	GER -	IOM; NC	NED -	BEL -	DDR -		SWE -	FIN -	ULS -	NAT -	ESP -		0	–	0
1972	250cc	Yamaha	GER -	FRA -	AUT -	NAT -	IOM; 3	YUG -	NED -	BEL -	DDR -	CZE -	SWE -	FIN -	ESP -	10	18th	0
1972	350cc	Honda	GER -	FRA -	AUT -	NAT -	IOM; NC	YUG -	NED -		DDR -	CZE -	SWE -	FIN -	ESP -	0	–	0
1972	500cc	Matchless	GER -	FRA -	AUT -	NAT -	IOM; NC	YUG -	NED -	BEL -	DDR -	CZE -	SWE -	FIN -	ESP -	0	–	0
1973	250cc	Yamaha	FRA -	AUT -	GER -		IOM; 2	YUG -	NED -	BEL -	CZE -	SWE -	FIN -	ESP -		12	17th	0
1973	350cc	Yamaha	FRA -	AUT -	GER -	NAT -	IOM; 3	YUG -	NED -		CZE -	SWE -	FIN -	ESP -		10	20th	0
1973	500cc	Matchless	FRA -	AUT -	GER -		IOM; NC	YUG -	NED -	BEL -	CZE -	SWE -	FIN -	ESP -		0	–	0
1974	250cc	Yamaha		GER -		NAT -	IOM -	NED -	BEL; 9	SWE -	FIN -	CZE -	YUG -	ESP -		2	38th	0
1974	350cc	Yamaha	FRA -	GER -	AUT; 9	NAT -	IOM -	NED; 8		SWE -	FIN; 9		YUG -	ESP -		7	29th	0
1974	500cc	Yamaha	FRA; 7	GER -	AUT; 8	NAT -	IOM -	NED; 10	BEL; 7	SWE; 10	FIN; 6	CZE -				18	11th	0
1975	250cc	Yamaha	FRA -	ESP -		GER -	NAT -	IOM; 3	NED -	BEL; 9	SWE -	FIN; 8	CZE -	YUG -		15	14th	0
1975	350cc	Yamaha	FRA -	ESP; 10	AUT -	GER -	NAT -	IOM; NC	NED -			FIN -	CZE -	YUG -		1	47th	0
1975	500cc	Yamaha	FRA -		AUT -	GER -	NAT -	IOM; 2	NED; 7	BEL; 5	SWE; 3	FIN -	CZE -			32	5th	0
1976	500cc	Suzuki	FRA; Ret	AUT; Ret	NAT -	IOM; 7	NED; 6	BEL; 1	SWE -	FIN -	CZE -	GER -				24	9th	1
1977	350cc	Yamaha	VEN -		GER -	NAT -	ESP -	FRA -	YUG -	NED -		SWE -	FIN -	CZE -	GBR; 3	10	22nd	0
1977	500cc	Suzuki	VEN -	AUT -	GER -	NAT; 16		FRA -		NED -	BEL; 10	SWE; 8	FIN -	CZE -	GBR -	4	26th	0
1978	500cc	Suzuki	VEN -	ESP -	AUT -	FRA -	NAT -	NED -	BEL -	SWE -	FIN -	GBR; 12	GER -			0	–	0
