= Aldo Nannini =

Venezuelan motorcycle racer (1951–1977)

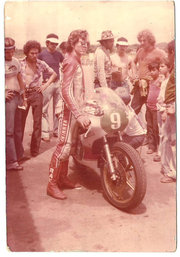
- Nationality: (Venezuela) Venezuelan
Motorcycle racing career statistics
Grand Prix motorcycle racing
Active years	1977
First race	1977 250cc Venezuelan Grand Prix
Last race	1977 250cc British Grand Prix
Starts / Wins / Podiums / Poles / F. laps / Points; 5 / 0 / 1 / 0 / 0 / 19

Aldo Nannini (13 March 1951 – 4 November 1977) was a Venezuelan professional motorcycle racer. He was born in Caracas, Venezuela but grew up in Valera, Trujillo. Nannini competed in the Grand Prix road racing world championship in the 1977 Grand Prix motorcycle racing season. His best finish was a second place at the 1977 250cc British Grand Prix behind Kork Ballington. Nannini died in a road accident in Caracas after the 1977 season.

== Grand Prix career statistics ==
**Position**	1	2	3	4	5	6	7	8	9	10
**Points**	15	12	10	8	6	5	4	3	2	1

(key) (Races in bold indicate pole position; races in italics indicate fastest lap)

Year	Class	Team	Machine	1	2	3	4	5	6	7	8	9	10	11	12	Points	Rank	Wins
1977	250cc	Venemotos-Yamaha	TZ250	VEN; 7	GER; 8	NAT -	ESP -	FRA -	YUG -	NED; 14	BEL -	SWE; 17	FIN; 13	CZE; 12	GBR; 2	19	15th	0
