= 1977 Spanish motorcycle Grand Prix =

(Spain) 1977 Spanish Grand Prix
Race details
- Race 5 of 13 races in the 1977 Grand Prix motorcycle racing season
- Date: 22 May 1977
- Official name: Gran Premio de España
- Location: Circuito Permanente del Jarama
- Course: Permanent racing facility; 3.404 km (2.115 mi)

350cc
Pole position
Rider	(South Africa) Alan North	Yamaha
Time	1:38.7	
Fastest lap
Rider	(France) Michel Rougerie	Yamaha
Time	1:39.9	
Podium
First	(France) Michel Rougerie	Yamaha
Second	(France) Christian Sarron	Yamaha
Third	(Japan) Takazumi Katayama	Yamaha

250cc
Pole position
Rider	(Japan) Ken Nemoto	Yamaha
Time	1:40.2	
Fastest lap
Rider	(Japan) Takazumi Katayama	Yamaha
Time	1:39.9	
Podium
First	(Japan) Takazumi Katayama	Yamaha
Second	(South Africa) Alan North	Yamaha
Third	(France) Olivier Chevallier	Yamaha

125cc
Pole position
Rider	(Italy) Pierpaolo Bianchi	Morbidelli
Time	1:43.6	
Fastest lap
Rider	(Italy) Pierpaolo Bianchi	Morbidelli
Time	1:44.5	
Podium
First	(Italy) Pierpaolo Bianchi	Morbidelli
Second	(Italy) Eugenio Lazzarini	Morbidelli
Third	(France) Jean-Louis Guignabodet	Morbidelli

50cc
Pole position
Rider	(Spain) Ángel Nieto	Bultaco
Time	1:53.0	
Fastest lap
Rider	(Italy) Eugenio Lazzarini	Kreidler
Time	1:50.3	
Podium
First	(Spain) Ángel Nieto	Bultaco
Second	(Italy) Eugenio Lazzarini	Kreidler
Third	(Spain) Ricardo Tormo	Bultaco

The 1977 Spanish motorcycle Grand Prix was the fifth round of the 1977 Grand Prix motorcycle racing season. It took place on 22 May 1977 at the Circuito Permanente del Jarama.

== 350 cc classification ==
Pos	No.	Rider	Manufacturer	Laps	Time	Grid	Points
1	43	(France) Michel Rougerie	Yamaha	38	1:05:18.9	2	15
2	19	(France) Christian Sarron	Yamaha	38	+22.6	8	12
3	7	(Japan) Takazumi Katayama	Yamaha	38	+31.5	12	10
4	42	(Switzerland) Bruno Kneubühler	Yamaha	38	+52.5	3	8
5	37	(France) Patrick Pons	Yamaha	38	+59.7	10	6
6	36	(South Africa) Jon Ekerold	Yamaha	38	+1:04.2	9	5
7	33	(Finland) Pekka Nurmi	Yamaha	38	+1:21.3	13	4
8	41	(Finland) Tapio Virtanen	Yamaha	38	+1:30.3	17	3
9	21	(Australia) Vic Soussan	Yamaha	37	+1 lap	16	2
10	40	(France) Jean-Claude Hogrel	Yamaha	37	+1 lap		1
11	32	(Finland) Markku Matikainen	Yamaha	37	+1 lap	15	
12	27	(United Kingdom) Alex George	Yamaha	37	+1 lap		
13	18	(Japan) Ken Nemoto	Yamaha	36	+2 laps		
14	3	(United Kingdom) Chas Mortimer	Yamaha	36	+2 laps	11	
		(South Africa) Alan North	Yamaha			1	
		(France) Olivier Chevallier	Yamaha			4	
		(Spain) Benjamin Grau	Yamaha			5	
		(United Kingdom) Tom Herron	Yamaha			6	
		(South Africa) Kork Ballington	Yamaha			7	
		(Australia) John Dodds	Yamaha			14	
		(France) Philippe Bouzanne	Yamaha			18	
		(Italy) Giacomo Agostini	Yamaha			19	
		(Finland) Pentti Korhonen	Yamaha			20	
30 starters in total

== 250 cc classification ==
Pos	No.	Rider	Manufacturer	Laps	Time	Grid	Points
1	2	(Japan) Takazumi Katayama	Yamaha	35	59:10.6	6	15
2	8	(South Africa) Alan North	Yamaha	35	+25.9	3	12
3	9	(France) Olivier Chevallier	Yamaha	35	+32.4	10	10
4	27	(France) Christian Sarron	Yamaha	35	+39.8	9	8
5	50	(Italy) Mario Lega	Morbidelli	35	+50.7		6
6	58	(France) Michel Rougerie	Yamaha	35	+55.3		5
7	4	(United Kingdom) Tom Herron	Yamaha	35	+1:02.2	19	4
8	35	(United Kingdom) Barry Ditchburn	Kawasaki	35	+1:04.6	2	3
9	36	(Japan) Akihiko Kiyohara	Kawasaki	35	+1:09.0		2
10	57	(Switzerland) Bruno Kneubühler	Yamaha	35	+1:36.5	14	1
11	32	(South Africa) Kork Ballington	Yamaha	35	+1:39.0	13	
12	30	(Australia) Vic Soussan	Yamaha	34	+1 lap		
13	23	(Italy) Franco Uncini	Harley-Davidson	34	+1 lap	12	
14	55	(France) Jean-Claude Hogrel	Harley-Davidson	34	+1 lap		
15	41	(Switzerland) Michel Frutschi	Yamaha	34	+1 lap		
16	19	(Italy) Sauro Pazzaglia	Yamaha	34	+1 lap		
17	18	(Japan) Ken Nemoto	Yamaha	34	+1 lap	1	
18	11	(Spain) Andrés Pérez Rubio	Yamaha	34	+1 lap		
19	17	(Spain) Carlos de San Antonio	Yamaha	33	+2 laps		
20	15	(Finland) Pekka Nurmi	Yamaha	29	+6 laps	16	
		(Spain) Benjamin Grau	Yamaha			4	
		(France) Guy Bertin	Yamaha			5	
		(Venezuela) Aldo Nannini	Yamaha			7	
		(Germany) Anton Mang	Yamaha			8	
		(Italy) Vinicio Salmi	Yamaha			11	
		(United Kingdom) Chas Mortimer	Yamaha			15	
		(South Africa) Jon Ekerold	Yamaha			17	
		(France) Jean-François Baldé	Kawasaki			18	
		(Sweden) Leif Gustafsson	Yamaha			20	
29 starters in total

== 125 cc classification ==
Pos	No.	Rider	Manufacturer	Laps	Time	Grid	Points
1	1	(Italy) Pierpaolo Bianchi	Morbidelli	30	53:52.4	1	15
2	28	(Italy) Eugenio Lazzarini	Morbidelli	30	+1:04.5	3	12
3	5	(France) Jean-Louis Guignabodet	Morbidelli	30	+1:40.6	13	10
4	45	(Italy) Giovanni Ziggiotto	Morbidelli	30	+1:48.9	7	8
5	27	(Belgium) Julien van Zeebroeck	Morbidelli	30	+1:54.5	9	6
6	40	(Sweden) Per-Edward Carlsson	Morbidelli	29	+1 lap	12	5
7	32	(Austria) Johann Parzer	Morbidelli	28	+2 laps	10	4
8	31	(Austria) Werner Schmied	Rotax	28	+2 laps		3
9	20	(Argentina) Guillermo Pérez	Yamaha	26	+4 laps	18	2
10	18	(Spain) Jorge Navarrete	Ringhini	25	+5 laps		1
		(Spain) Ángel Nieto	Bultaco			2	
		(Germany) Gert Bender	Bender			4	
		(Italy) Sauro Pazzaglia	Morbidelli			5	
		(Germany) Anton Mang	Morbidelli			6	
		(Switzerland) Stefan Dörflinger	Morbidelli			8	
		(France) Patrick Plisson	Morbidelli			11	
		(Austria) Harald Bartol	Morbidelli			14	
		(Spain) Miguel Cortes	Ringhini			15	
		(Spain) Agustin Pérez Calafat	Morbidelli			16	
		(Finland) Matti Kinnunen	Morbidelli			17	
		(France) François Granon	Maico			19	
		(France) Jacques Hutteau	Morbidelli			20	
20 starters in total

== 50 cc classification ==
Pos	No.	Rider	Manufacturer	Laps	Time	Grid	Points
1	1	(Spain) Ángel Nieto	Bultaco	18	33:39.3	1	15
2	4	(Italy) Eugenio Lazzarini	Kreidler	18	+9.7	2	12
3	16	(Spain) Ricardo Tormo	Bultaco	18	+17.4	3	10
4	2	(Germany) Herbert Rittberger	Kreidler	18	+1:43.2	7	8
5	34	(Switzerland) Stefan Dörflinger	Kreidler	17	+1 lap	4	6
6	9	(France) Jean-Louis Guignabodet	Morbidelli	17	+1 lap	9	5
7	3	(Switzerland) Ulrich Graf	Kreidler	17	+1 lap	6	4
8	28	(Spain) Ramón Gali	Derbi	16	+2 laps	19	3
9	15	(Germany) Günter Schirnhofer	Kreidler	16	+2 laps	18	2
10	18	(Spain) Jorge Navarrete	Derbi	16	+2 laps	13	1
11	6	(France) Artur Benitah	Kreidler	16	+2 laps	11	
12	7	(France) Daniel Corvi	Kreidler	16	+2 laps	17	
13	17	(Switzerland) Rudolf Kunz	Kreidler	16	+2 laps	8	
NC	22	(Italy) Aldo Pero	Kreidler	13	+5 laps	15	
		(France) Patrick Plisson	ABF			5	
		(Germany) Ingo Emmerich	Kreidler			10	
		(Germany) Wolfgang Müller	Kreidler			12	
		(Spain) Gaspar Legaz	Kreidler			14	
		(France) Jacques Hutteau	ABF			16	
		(Spain) Joaquin Gali	Bultaco			20	
25 starters in total

Previous race: 1977 Nations Grand Prix	FIM Grand Prix World Championship; 1977 season	Next race: 1977 French Grand Prix
Previous race: 1976 Spanish Grand Prix	Spanish Grand Prix	Next race: 1978 Spanish Grand Prix
