= 1976 French motorcycle Grand Prix =

(France) 1976 French Grand Prix
Race details
- Race 1 of 12 races in the 1976 Grand Prix motorcycle racing season
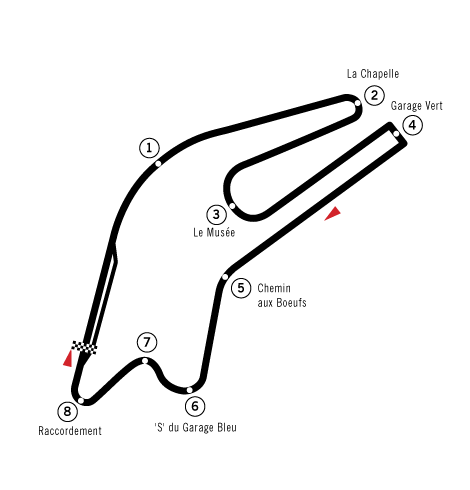
- Date: 25 April 1976
- Official name: Grand Prix de France Moto
- Location: Bugatti Circuit
- Course: Permanent racing facility; 4.240 km (2.635 mi)

500cc
Pole position
Rider	(United Kingdom) Barry Sheene	Suzuki
Time	1:43.160	
Fastest lap
Rider	(Italy) Marco Lucchinelli	Suzuki
Time	1:41.400	
Podium
First	(United Kingdom) Barry Sheene	Suzuki
Second	(Venezuela) Johnny Cecotto	Yamaha
Third	(Italy) Marco Lucchinelli	Suzuki

350cc
Pole position
Rider	(Italy) Giacomo Agostini	MV Agusta
Time	1:45.600	
Fastest lap
Rider	(Italy) Walter Villa	Harley-Davidson
Time	1:44.600	
Podium
First	(Italy) Walter Villa	Harley-Davidson
Second	(Venezuela) Johnny Cecotto	Yamaha
Third	(France) Jean-François Baldé	Yamaha

250cc
Pole position
Rider	(Italy) Walter Villa	Harley-Davidson
Time	1:48.920	
Fastest lap
Rider	(Italy) Walter Villa	Harley-Davidson
Time	1:47.800	
Podium
First	(Italy) Walter Villa	Harley-Davidson
Second	(Italy) Gianfranco Bonera	Harley-Davidson
Third	(Finland) Pentti Korhonen	Yamaha

50cc
Pole position
Rider	(Spain) Ángel Nieto	Bultaco
Time	2:13.390	
Fastest lap
Rider	(West Germany) Rudolf Kunz	Kreidler
Time	2:11.200	
Podium
First	(West Germany) Herbert Rittberger	Kreidler
Second	(West Germany) Rudolf Kunz	Kreidler
Third	(Switzerland) Stefan Dörflinger	Kreidler

Sidecar (B2A)
Pole position
Rider	(West Germany) Werner Schwärzel	König
Passenger	(West Germany) Andreas Huber	
Time	1:53.970	
Fastest lap
Rider	(Switzerland) Rolf Biland	Yamaha
Passenger	(United Kingdom) Ken Williams	
Time	1:52.800	
Podium
First rider	(Switzerland) Rolf Biland	Yamaha
First passenger	(United Kingdom) Ken Williams	
Second rider	(France) Alain Michel	Yamaha
Second passenger	(France) Bernard Garcia	
Third rider	(West Germany) Helmut Schilling	Aro
Third passenger	(West Germany) Rainer Gundel	

The 1976 French motorcycle Grand Prix was the first round of the 1976 Grand Prix motorcycle racing season. It took place on 25 April 1976 at the Circuit Bugatti Le Mans.

== 500cc classification ==
Pos.	No.	Rider	Team	Manufacturer	Time/Retired	Points
1	7	(United Kingdom) Barry Sheene	Texaco Heron Team Suzuki	Suzuki	51'45.330	15
2	55	(Venezuela) Johnny Cecotto	Team Venemotos	Yamaha	+3.840	12
3	33	(Italy) Marco Lucchinelli	Gallina Corse	Suzuki	+19.290	10
4	4	(Finland) Tepi Länsivuori	Life Racing Team	Suzuki	+49.850	8
5	1	(Italy) Giacomo Agostini	Team API Marlboro	MV Agusta	+55.650	6
6	43	(Spain) Victor Palomo	Swaep Motor Racing	Yamaha	+1'27.660	5
7	56	(New Zealand) Stuart Avant	Colemans	Suzuki	+1'28.240	4
8	13	(West Germany) Dieter Braun		Suzuki	+1'47.880	3
9	12	(Austria) Karl Auer	Racing Team NO	Yamaha	+1 lap	2
10	51	(Netherlands) Boet van Dulmen	Laponder Racing	Yamaha	+1 lap	1
11	19	(France) Olivier Chevallier		Yamaha	+1 lap	
12	45	(United Kingdom) Steve Parrish	Dave More	Yamaha	+1 lap	
13	11	(United Kingdom) Chas Mortimer	Takazumi Katayama Sarome Team	Yamaha	+1 lap	
14	25	(France) Gilles Husson		Yamaha	+1 lap	
15	6	(United Kingdom) Alex George	Hermetite Racing International	Yamaha	+1 lap	
16	44	(Brazil) Edmar Ferreira	Goias Swaep Motor	Yamaha	+1 lap	
17	48	(France) René Guili		Suzuki	+2 laps	
18	30	(Sweden) Johnny Bengtsson	Stigefetts Motor	Suzuki	+2 laps	
19	41	(Germany) Helmut Kassner		Suzuki	+2 laps	
20	36	(Belgium) Jules Nies		Suzuki	+3 laps	
Ret	??	(Australia) Jack Findlay	Jack Findlay Racing	Suzuki	Retired	
Ret	??	(United Kingdom) Phil Read	Team Life International	Suzuki	Retired	
Ret	??	(France) Thierry Tchernine		Suzuki	Retired	
Ret	??	(France) Christian Estrosi		Suzuki	Retired	
Ret	??	(France) Jean-Paul Boinet	Ecurie Jean Murit	Suzuki	Retired	
Ret	??	(Netherlands) Marcel Ankoné	Nimag Suzuki	Suzuki	Retired	
Ret	??	(Finland) Pentti Korhonen		Yamaha	Retired	
Ret	??	(Finland) Risto Makinen		Yamaha	Retired	
Ret	??	(Italy) Roberto Gallina	Gallina Corse	Suzuki	Retired	
Ret	??	(Brazil) Adu Celso-Santos		Yamaha	Retired	
Ret	??	(Switzerland) Philippe Coulon		Suzuki	Retired	
Ret	??	(Italy) Nico Cereghini	Life Racing Team	Suzuki	Retired	
Ret	??	(United Kingdom) John Williams	Texaco Heron Team Suzuki	Suzuki	Accident	
Ret	??	(United Kingdom) Eddie Roberts		Suzuki	Retired	
Ret	??	(United States) Pat Hennen	Colemans	Suzuki	Retired	
Ret	??	(Austria) Max Wiener	Racing Team NO	Yamaha	Retired	
DNS		(France) Michel Rougerie		Suzuki	Did not start	

== 350 cc classification ==
Pos	No.	Rider	Manufacturer	Laps	Time	Grid	Points
1	73	(Italy) Walter Villa	Harley-Davidson	30	52:45.01	4	15
2	1	(Venezuela) Johnny Cecotto	Yamaha	30	+17.91	3	12
3	24	(France) Jean-François Baldé	Yamaha	30	+30.07	7	10
4	70	(Japan) Takazumi Katayama	Yamaha	30	+37.05	2	8
5	44	(France) Olivier Chevallier	Yamaha	30	+42.33	8	6
6	49	(Italy) Paolo Tordi	Yamaha	30	+44.73	6	5
7	42	(France) Patrick Fernandez	Yamaha	30	+57.12	5	4
8	3	(Finland) Pentti Korhonen	Yamaha	30	+1:04.88		3
9	9	(United Kingdom) Tom Herron	Yamaha	30	+1:09.72		2
10	65	(Australia) John Dodds	Yamaha	30	+1:16.94		1
11	52	(Finland) Pekka Nurmi	Yamaha	30	+1:40.94		
12	28	(France) Alain Vial	Yamaha	30	+1:42.52		
13	81	(France) Claude Benelhadj	Yamaha	30	+1:56.00		
14	46	(France) Jean-Louis Olivier	Yamaha	29	+1 lap		
15	32	(France) Christian Bourgeois	Yamaha	29	+1 lap		
16	47	(France) Hervé Moineau	Yamaha	29	+1 lap		
17	62	(United Kingdom) John Weeden	Yamaha	29	+1 lap		
18	60	(South Africa) Alan North	Yamaha	25	+5 laps (Note: North, Parrish, Kunz and Coulon retired but were classified as finishers.)		
19	61	(United Kingdom) Steve Parrish	Yamaha	25	+5 laps		
20	22	(Switzerland) Franz Kunz	Yamaha	24	+6 laps		
21	13	(Switzerland) Philippe Coulon	Yamaha	23	+7 laps		
Ret		(Italy) Giacomo Agostini	MV Agusta			1	
Ret		(France) Patrick Pons	Yamaha			9	
Ret		(France) Christian Huguet	Yamaha			10	
36 starters in total

Footnotes

== 250 cc classification ==
Pos	No.	Rider	Manufacturer	Laps	Time	Grid	Points
1	1	(Italy) Walter Villa	Harley Davidson	30	54:41.62	1	15
2	90	(Italy) Gianfranco Bonera	Harley Davidson	30	+42.14	6	12
3	19	(Finland) Pentti Korhonen	Yamaha	30	+48.71	5	10
4	49	(France) Olivier Chevallier	Yamaha	30	+49.92	8	8
5	18	(France) Gérard Choukron	Yamaha	30	+1:03.05		6
6	59	(Finland) Pekka Nurmi	Yamaha	30	+1:08.01		5
7	5	(France) Patrick Pons	Yamaha	30	+1:08.18		4
8	36	(France) Philippe Bouzanne	Yamaha	30	+1:09.42		3
9	21	(France) Jean-Claude Hogrel	Yamaha	30	+1:09.57		2
10	46	(France) Patrick Fernandez	Yamaha	30	+1:11.52	9	1
11	65	(Australia) John Dodds	Yamaha	30	+1:24.28		
12	6	(United Kingdom) Chas Mortimer	Yamaha	30	+1:29.55		
13	32	(France) Denis Boulom	Yamaha	30	+1:29.80		
14	74	(Italy) Paolo Tordi	Yamaha	30	+1:35.87		
15	63	(Spain) Jaime Samaranch	Yamaha	30	+1:36.17		
16	34	(France) Gilbert Lavelle	Yamaha	30	+1:36.84		
17	53	(France) Christian Huguet	Yamaha	30	+1:45.48		
18	48	(France) Christian Sarron	Yamaha	29	+1 lap	10	
19	54	(France) Thiérry Noblesse	Yamaha	29	+1 lap		
20	8	(Sweden) Leif Gustafsson	Yamaha	28	+2 laps (Note: Gustafsson, Herron and Moineau retired but were classified as finishers.)		
21	13	(United Kingdom) Tom Herron	Yamaha	25	+5 laps		
22	23	(France) Hervé Moineau	Yamaha	23	+7 laps		
Ret		(United States) Pat Evans	Yamaha			2	
Ret		(France) Raymond Roche	Yamaha			3	
Ret		(Finland) Tapio Virtanen	MZ			4	
Ret		(Switzerland) Franz Kunz	Yamaha			7	
36 starters in total

Footnotes

== 50 cc classification ==
Pos	No.	Rider	Manufacturer	Laps	Time	Grid	Points
1	5	(Germany) Herbert Rittberger	Kreidler	15	34:04.21	6	15
2	4	(Germany) Rudolf Kunz	Kreidler	15	+0.19	4	12
3	6	(Switzerland) Stefan Dörflinger	Kreidler	15	+3.57	7	10
4	25	(France) Pierre Audry	ABF	15	+4.88	2	8
5	12	(Italy) Aldo Pero	Kreidler	15	+1:07.39		6
6	11	(Netherlands) Theo Timmer	Yamathi	15	+1:17.45		5
7	28	(France) Yves le Tourmelin	Scrab-Ty	15	+1:21.14		4
8	2	(Italy) Eugenio Lazzarini	Morbidelli	15	+1:22.42	5	3
9	23	(France) Benjamin Laurent	Kreidler	15	+1:52.42		2
10	14	(Switzerland) Ulrich Graf	Kreidler	15	+1:54.27		1
11	38	(France) Jacques Hutteau	Scrab	15	+2:07.53		
12	24	(France) Raymond Duriez	Kreidler	15	+2:13.68		
13	42	(Hungary) J. Zweisldo	Kreidler	14	+1 lap		
14	33	(Spain) Joaquin Gali	Derbi	14	+1 lap		
15	36	(Germany) Günter Schirnhöfer	Kreidler	14	+1 lap		
16	44	(Belgium) Giuido Delys	Kreidler	13	+2 laps		
17	26	(France) Pierre Harlay	Kreidler	13	+2 laps		
18	16	(Netherlands) Cees van Dongen	Morbidelli	12	+3 laps (Note: van Dongen retired but was classified as a finisher.)	8	
19	29	(Belgium) Patrick de Wulf	Kreidler	12	+3 laps		
Ret		(Spain) Ángel Nieto	Bultaco			1	
Ret		(France) Jean-Paul Fargues	ABF			3	
Ret		(Netherlands) Nico Polane	Morbidelli			9	
Ret		(Belgium) Julien van Zeebroeck	Kreidler			10	
32 starters in total

Footnotes

== Sidecar classification ==
Pos	No.	Rider	Passenger	Manufacturer	Laps	Time	Grid	Points
1	3	(Switzerland) Rolf Biland	(United Kingdom) Ken Williams	Yamaha	25	47:53.53	4	15
2	32	(France) Alain Michel	(France) Bernard Garcia	Yamaha	25	+4.13	2	12
3	11	(Germany) Helmut Schilling	(Germany) Rainer Gundel	Aro-Fath	24	+1 lap	5	10
4	21	(Switzerland) Bruno Holzer	(Switzerland) Charly Meierhans	LCR-Yamaha	24	+1 lap	6	8
5	9	(Italy) Amedeo Zini	(Italy) Andrea Fornaro	König	24	+1 lap		6
6	34	(Switzerland) Hanspeter Hubacher	(Switzerland) Kurt Huber	Yamaha	24	+1 lap		5
7	27	(Germany) Ted Janssen	(Germany) Eric Schmitz	Yamaha	24	+1 lap		4
8	22	(Germany) Siegfried Schauzu	(Germany) Clifton Lorentz	Aro-Fath	23	+2 laps		3
9	15	(United Kingdom) Dick Greasley	(United Kingdom) Cliff Holland	Chell Yamaha	23	+2 laps		2
10	14	(Germany) Heinz Luthringhauser	(Germany) Lorenzo Puzo	BMW	23	+2 laps		1
11	2	(Germany) Werner Schwärzel	(Germany) Andreas Huber	König	22	+3 laps (Note: Schwärzel and Huber retired but were classified as finishers.)	1	
12	25	(France) Yves Trolliet	(France) P. Muller	König	22	+3 laps		
Ret		(Germany) Klaus Enders	(Germany) Wolfgang Kalauch	Heukerot			3	
Ret		(Austria) Hans Prugl	(Austria) Horst Kussberger	König			7	
Ret		(Switzerland) Hermann Schmid	(Switzerland) Jean Petit	Yamaha			7	
24 starters in total

Footnotes

Previous race: 1975 Yugoslavian Grand Prix	FIM Grand Prix World Championship; 1976 season	Next race: 1976 Austrian Grand Prix
Previous race: 1975 French Grand Prix	French Grand Prix	Next race: 1977 French Grand Prix
