= Barry Ditchburn =

British motorcycle racer

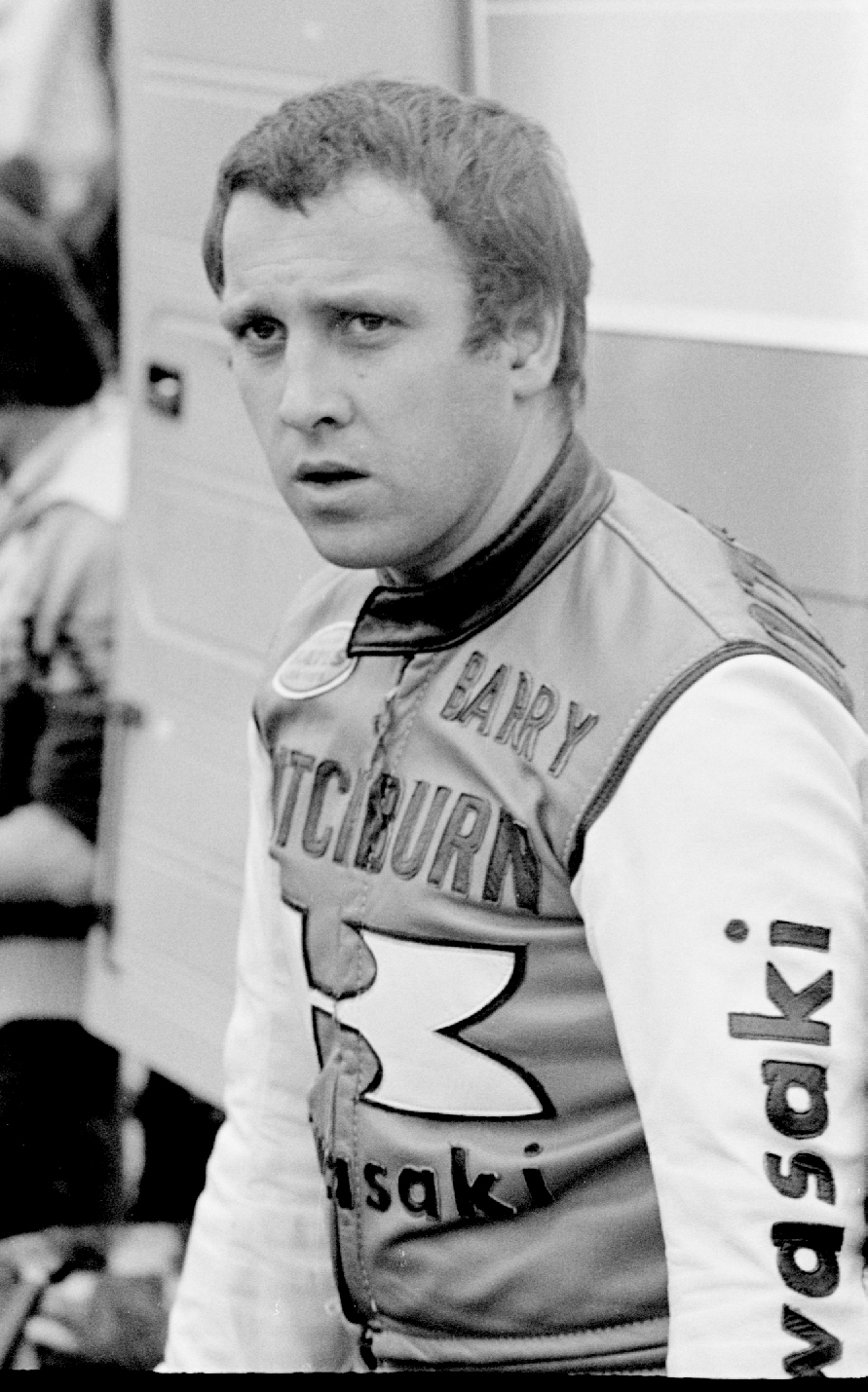
- Nationality: British
Motorcycle racing career statistics
Grand Prix motorcycle racing
Active years	1977, 1979
First race	1977 250cc German Grand Prix
Last race	1979 250cc Nations Grand Prix
Team	Kawasaki
Championships	0
Starts / Wins / Podiums / Poles / F. laps / Points; 8 / 0 / 3 / 1 / 0 / 40
Isle of Man TT career
TTs contested	2 (1970, 1975)
TT wins	0
TT podiums	0

Barry Ditchburn (21 April 1949) is a British former professional Grand Prix motorcycle road racer.

Ditchburn was born in Northfleet, Kent, England. His best year was in 1977 when he finished in 11th place in the 250cc world championship as a teammate to Kork Ballington and Mick Grant on the Kawasaki factory racing team.

== Grand Prix motorcycle racing results ==
**Position**	1	2	3	4	5	6	7	8	9	10
**Points**	15	12	10	8	6	5	4	3	2	1

(key) (Races in bold indicate pole position; races in italics indicate fastest lap)

Year	Class	Team	1	2	3	4	5	6	7	8	9	10	11	12	Points	Rank	Wins
1977	250cc	Kawasaki	VEN -	GER; 10	NAT; 3	ESP; 8	**FRA** -	YUG -	NED; 3	BEL; 11	SWE -	FIN; 8	CZE -	GBR -	27	11th	0
1979	250cc	Kawasaki	VEN -	GER; 8	NAT; 3	ESP -	YUG -	NED -	BEL -	SWE -	FIN -	GBR -	CZE -	FRA -	13	16th	0
