= 1977 German motorcycle Grand Prix =

(West Germany) 1977 German Grand Prix
Race details
- Race 3 of 13 races in the 1977 Grand Prix motorcycle racing season
- Date: 8 May 1977
- Official name: Großer Preis von Deutschland
- Location: Hockenheimring
- Course: Permanent racing facility; 6.789 km (4.218 mi)

500cc
Pole position
- Rider: (United Kingdom) Barry Sheene
- Time: 2:14.200
Fastest lap
- Rider: (United Kingdom) Barry Sheene
- Time: 2:14.400
Podium
- First: (United Kingdom) Barry Sheene
- Second: (United States) Pat Hennen
- Third: (United States) Steve Baker

350cc
Pole position
- Rider: (South Africa) Alan North
- Time: 2:16.200
Fastest lap
- Rider: (Italy) Giacomo Agostini
- Time: 2:21.800
Podium
- First: (Japan) Takazumi Katayama
- Second: (Italy) Giacomo Agostini
- Third: (France) Olivier Chevallier

250cc
Pole position
- Rider: (Japan) Akihiro Kiyohara
- Time: 2:26.9
Fastest lap
- Rider: (Japan) Akihiro Kiyohara
- Time: 2:28.000
Podium
- First: (France) Christian Sarron
- Second: (Japan) Akihiro Kiyohara
- Third: (Italy) Franco Uncini

125cc
Pole position
- Rider: (Italy) Eugenio Lazzarini
- Time: 2:33.000
Fastest lap
- Rider: (Italy) Pierpaolo Bianchi
- Time: 2:45.400
Podium
- First: (Italy) Pierpaolo Bianchi
- Second: (Italy) Eugenio Lazzarini
- Third: (West Germany) Anton Mang

Sidecar (B2A)
Pole position
- Rider: (Switzerland) Rolf Biland
- Passenger: (United Kingdom) Ken Williams
- Time: 2:27.000
Fastest lap
- Rider: (Switzerland) Rolf Biland
- Passenger: (United Kingdom) Ken Williams
- Time: 2:36.300
Podium
- First rider: (Switzerland) Rolf Biland
- First passenger: (United Kingdom) Ken Williams
- Second rider: (West Germany) Max Venus
- Second passenger: (West Germany) Norman Bittermann
- Third rider: (United Kingdom) George O'Dell
- Third passenger: (United Kingdom) Kenny Arthur

The 1977 German motorcycle Grand Prix was the third round of the 1977 Grand Prix motorcycle racing season. It took place on 8 May 1977 at the Hockenheimring circuit.

== 500cc classification ==
Pos.	No.	Rider	Team	Manufacturer	Time/Retired	Points
1	7	(United Kingdom) Barry Sheene	Texaco Heron Team Suzuki	Suzuki	45'36.100	15
2	3	(United States) Pat Hennen	Texaco Heron Team Suzuki	Suzuki	+9.600	12
3	2	(United States) Steve Baker	Yamaha Motor Company	Yamaha	+18.200	10
4	16	(United Kingdom) Steve Parrish	Texaco Heron Team Suzuki	Suzuki	+27.400	8
5	6	(Switzerland) Philippe Coulon	Marlboro Masche Total	Suzuki	+27.900	6
6	45	(Netherlands) Wil Hartog	Riemersma Racing	Suzuki	+48.400	5
7	4	(Italy) Marco Lucchinelli	Life Racing Team	Suzuki	+51.400	4
8	49	(West Germany) Anton Mang	Valvoline Racing Hamburg	Suzuki	+1'10.300	3
9	28	(Austria) Max Wiener	MSC Rottenberg	Yamaha	+1'13.200	2
10	58	(Netherlands) Boet van Dulmen	Pullshaw	Suzuki	+1'14.300	1
11	42	(New Zealand) Stuart Avant	Sid Griffiths Racing	Suzuki	+1'14.600	
12	32	(Italy) Gianfranco Bonera	Team Nava Olio Fiat	Suzuki	+1'38.400	
13	8	(Australia) Jack Findlay	Hermetite Racing International	Suzuki	+1'50.000	
14	10	(United Kingdom) Alex George	Hermetite Racing International	Suzuki	+1'55.900	
15	5	(United Kingdom) John Newbold	Maurice Newbold	Suzuki	+2'43.500	
16	20	(West Germany) Helmut Kassner	Boeri Giudici Racing Team	Suzuki	+1 lap	
17	??	(Denmark) Børge Nielsen		Suzuki	+1 lap	
18	??	(West Germany) Franz Rau		Suzuki	+1 lap	
19	48	(West Germany) Franz Heller	Bromme GMHH Suzuki Racing	Suzuki	+1 lap	
20	48	(West Germany) Harald Merkl	Nava Kucera Racing Team	Suzuki	+1 lap	
21	??	(Belgium) Jean-Philippe Orban	Jean-Philippe Orban Racing Team	Suzuki	+1 lap	
22	??	(United Kingdom) John Weeden	Jean-Philippe Orban Racing Team	Yamaha	+1 lap	
23	??	(Denmark) Kaj Jensen		Yamaha	+1 lap	
24	??	(West Germany) Johannes Klement		Yamaha	+1 lap	
25	??	(Sweden) Bo Granath		Suzuki	+1 lap	
26	??	(Sweden) Lars Johansson		Yamaha	+2 laps	
27	??	(Belgium) Hervé Regout	Hervé Regout	Suzuki	+2 laps	
28	??	(Austria) Hans Braumandl	Team Nava Olio Fiat	Suzuki	+2 laps	
29	??	(Austria) Peter Sjöström		Yamaha	+2 laps	
30	12	(Italy) Virginio Ferrari	Team Nava Olio Fiat	Suzuki	+2 laps	
Ret	??	(Finland) Teuvo Länsivuori	Life Racing Team	Suzuki	Retired	
Ret	??	(South Africa) Leslie van Breda		Suzuki	Retired	
Ret	??	(Italy) Giacomo Agostini	Team API Marlboro	Yamaha	Retired	
Ret	??	(France) Michel Rougerie		Suzuki	Retired	
Ret	??	(France) Christian Estrosi	Marlboro Masche Total	Suzuki	Retired	
Ret	??	(United Kingdom) John Williams	Team Appleby Glade	Suzuki	Retired	
Ret	??	(Italy) Nico Cereghini	Life Racing Team	Suzuki	Retired	
Ret	??	(Italy) Armando Toracca	MC della Robbia	Suzuki	Retired	
DNS	??	(France) Bernard Fau		Suzuki	Did not start	
DNS	??	(West Germany) Arndt Härle		Yamaha	Did not start	
DNS	??	(Austria) Karl Auer	MSC Rottenberg	Yamaha	Did not start	
DNS	??	(West Germany) Hans-Günter Schöne		Yamaha	Did not start	
DNS	??	(West Germany) Horst Lahfeld		König	Did not start	
DNS	10	(Netherlands) Marcel Ankoné	Pullshaw	Suzuki	Did not start	
DNS	10	(Italy) Carlo Perugini	Life Racing Team	Suzuki	Did not start	

== 350 cc classification ==
Pos	No.	Rider	Manufacturer	Laps	Time	Grid	Points
1	8	(Japan) Takazumi Katayama	Yamaha	20	48:28.8		15
2	9	(Italy) Giacomo Agostini	Yamaha	20	+15.1		12
3	10	(France) Olivier Chevallier	Yamaha	20	+15.5		10
4	56	(South Africa) Alan North	Yamaha	20	+18.9	1	8
5	51	(Switzerland) Philippe Bouzanne	Yamaha	20	+35.5		6
6	4	(United Kingdom) Tom Herron	Yamaha	20	+42.8	6	5
7	1	(Italy) Walter Villa	Harley-Davidson	20	+47.0	4	4
8	54	(France) Christian Sarron	Yamaha	20	+52.9		3
9	17	(France) Michel Rougerie	Yamaha	20	+57.4	5	2
10	46	(Finland) Pekka Nurmi	Yamaha	20	+1:00.7	7	1
11	24	(West Germany) Helmut Kassner	Yamaha	20	+1:10.2		
12	7	(Switzerland) Bruno Kneubühler	Yamaha	20	+1:10.5	10	
13	27	(United Kingdom) Ian Richards	Yamaha	20	+1:18.1		
14	47	(United Kingdom) John Newbold	Yamaha	20	+1:18.6		
15	57	(Austria) Edi Stöllinger	Yamaha	20	+1:29.7		
		(Italy) Giuseppe Consalvi	Yamaha			2	
		(South Africa) Jon Ekerold	Yamaha			3	
		(Australia) John Dodds	Yamaha			8	
		(Italy) Franco Uncini	Harley-Davidson			9	
45 starters in total, 30 finishers

== 250 cc classification ==
Pos	No.	Rider	Manufacturer	Laps	Time	Grid	Points
1	62	(France) Christian Sarron	Yamaha	19	49:33.0		15
2	54	(Japan) Akihiko Kiyohara	Kawasaki	19	+0.1	1	12
3	69	(Italy) Franco Uncini	Harley-Davidson	19	+45.3	6	10
4	70	(Italy) Vinicio Salmi	Yamaha	19	+1:00.5		8
5	36	(Finland) Pekka Nurmi	Yamaha	19	+1:02.5		6
6	59	(South Africa) Kork Ballington	Yamaha	19	+1:02.7		5
7	5	(United Kingdom) Tom Herron	Yamaha	19	+1:02.9	4	4
8	51	(Venezuela) Aldo Nannini	Yamaha	19	+1:07.1	8	3
9	71	(South Africa) Alan North	Yamaha	19	+1:27.2		2
10	53	(United Kingdom) Barry Ditchburn	Kawasaki	19	+1:43.5	3	1
11	34	(Switzerland) Michel Frutschi	Yamaha	19	+1:46.8		
12	63	(Austria) Edi Stöllinger	Yamaha	19	+1:56.5		
13	64	(Australia) Vic Soussan	Yamaha	19	+2:07.5		
14	46	(West Germany) Harald Merkl	Yamaha	19	+2:31.5		
15	50	(West Germany) Egid Schwemmer	Yamaha	18	+1 lap		
		(Italy) Walter Villa	Harley-Davidson			2	
		(Switzerland) Hans Müller	Yamaha			5	
		(Sweden) Leif Gustafsson	Yamaha			7	
		(West Germany) Hans Schweiger	Kawasaki			9	
		(Denmark) Svend Andersson	Yamaha			10	
45 starters in total, 27 finishers

== 125 cc classification ==
Pos	No.	Rider	Manufacturer	Laps	Time	Grid	Points
1	1	(Italy) Pierpaolo Bianchi	Morbidelli	17	48:41.1	2	15
2	42	(Italy) Eugenio Lazzarini	Morbidelli	17	+16.6	1	12
3	2	(West Germany) Anton Mang	Morbidelli	17	+51.5	5	10
4	52	(Italy) Giovanni Ziggliotto	Morbidelli	17	+51.8		8
5	4	(West Germany) Gert Bender	Bender	17	+1:22.1	4	6
6	55	(Spain) Ángel Nieto	Bultaco	17	+1:22.8	3	5
7	38	(Switzerland) Hans Müller	Morbidelli	17	+1:30.2	7	4
8	32	(Switzerland) Rolf Blatter	Morbidelli	17	+2:02.5		3
9	48	(Netherlands) Jan Huberts	Morbidelli	17	+2:03.4		2
10	35	(Finland) Matti Kinnunen	Morbidelli	17	+2:06.1		1
11	36	(Sweden) Hans Hallberg	Morbidelli	17	+2:09.7		
12	6	(Switzerland) Xaver Tschannen	Bender	17	+2:45.6		
13	8	(West Germany) Manfred Kugler	Morbidelli	17	+2:47.2		
14	29	(Austria) Ernst Fagerer	Morbidelli	17	+2:50.8		
15	53	(France) Patrick Plisson	Morbidelli	17	+4:00.0		
		(Austria) Harald Bartol	Morbidelli			6	
		(Italy) Pierluigi Conforti	Morbidelli			8	
		(Hungary) János Drapál	Morbidelli			9	
		(Switzerland) Stefan Dörflinger	Morbidelli			10	
46 starters in total, 26 finishers

== 50 cc classification ==
Pos	No.	Rider	Manufacturer	Laps	Time	Grid	Points
1	2	(West Germany) Herbert Rittberger	Kreidler	11	35:16.7	4	15
2	45	(Italy) Eugenio Lazzarini	Kreidler	11	+4.3	2	12
3	1	(Spain) Ángel Nieto	Bultaco	11	+42.3	1	10
4	8	(Austria) Hans Hummel	Kreidler	11	+1:17.8	8	8
5	10	(Italy) Aldo Pero	Kreidler	11	+1:53.5		6
6	16	(West Germany) Hagen Klein	Kreidler	11	+2:10.2		5
7	52	(France) Patrick Plisson	ABF	11	+2:33.7	9	4
8	48	(Netherlands) Engelbert Kip	Kreidler	11	+2:42.4		3
9	12	(West Germany) Ingo Emmerich	Kreidler	11	+3:01.0	10	2
10	30	(France) Jacques Hutteau	ABF	11	+3:13.1		1
11	54	(Spain) Ricardo Tormo	Bultaco	10	+1 lap	3	
12	33	(Sweden) Lennart Lundgren	Kreidler	10	+1 lap		
13	35	(West Germany) Klaus Hilbk	Kreidler	10	+1 lap		
14	42	(France) Bruno de Carlo	Kreidler	10	+1 lap		
15	17	(West Germany) Kasim Rapczynski	Kreidler	10	+1 lap		
		(Switzerland) Ulrich Graf	Kreidler			5	
		(Switzerland) Stefan Dörflinger	Kreidler			6	
		(Switzerland) Hans Müller	Kreidler			7	
46 starters in total, 26 finishers

== Sidecar classification ==
Pos	No.	Rider	Passenger	Manufacturer	Laps	Time	Grid	Points
1	4	(Switzerland) Rolf Biland	(United Kingdom) Kenny Williams	Schmid-Yamaha	18	52:34.5	1	15
2	22	(West Germany) Max Venus	(West Germany) Norman Bittermann	König	18	+28.4	10	12
3	8	(United Kingdom) George O'Dell	(United Kingdom) Kenny Arthur	Windle-Yamaha	18	+43.1	4	10
4	29	(Switzerland) Bruno Holzer	(Switzerland) Charly Meierhans	LCR-Yamaha	18	+58.2	5	8
5	6	(West Germany) Helmut Schilling	(West Germany) Rainer Gundel	Aro	18	+59.7	7	6
6	1	(West Germany) Rolf Steinhausen	(West Germany) Sepp Huber	Busch-König	18	+1:16.8	8	5
7	9	(France) Alain Michel	(France) Gérard Lecorre	Yamaha	18	+1:48.3	2	4
8	5	(West Germany) Siegfried Schauzu	(West Germany) "Schimanski"	Yamaha	18	+1:54.6		3
9	11	(West Germany) Ted Janssen	(West Germany) Erich Schmitz	Colyam	18	+2:06.2		2
10	39	(West Germany) Kurt Jelonek	(West Germany) Volker Riess	König	17	+1 lap		1
		(Switzerland) Hermann Schmid	(Switzerland) Jean-Petit Matille	Schmid-Yamaha			3	
		(West Germany) Werner Schwärzel	(West Germany) Andreas Huber	Aro			6	
		(United Kingdom) Dick Greasley	(United Kingdom) Mick Skeels	Chell-Yamaha			9	
30 starters in total, 15 finishers

Previous race: 1977 Austrian Grand Prix	FIM Grand Prix World Championship; 1977 season	Next race: 1977 Nations Grand Prix
Previous race: 1976 German Grand Prix	German Grand Prix	Next race: 1978 German Grand Prix
