= Teuvo Länsivuori =

Finnish motorcycle racer

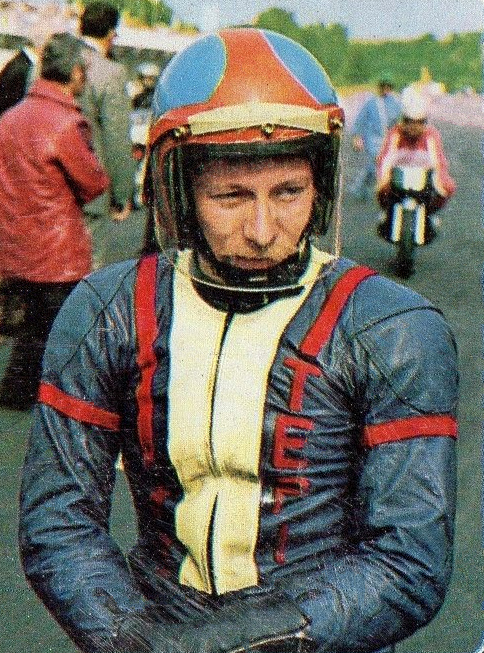
- Teuvo Länsivuori in 1972
- Nationality: Finnish
- Born: 9 December 1945 (age 80); Iisalmi, Finland
Motorcycle racing career statistics
Grand Prix motorcycle racing
Active years	1969 – 1978
First race	1969 250cc Finnish Grand Prix
Last race	1978 500cc German Grand Prix
First win	1971 350cc Spanish Grand Prix
Last win	1974 500cc Swedish Grand Prix
Team(s)	Yamaha, Suzuki
Championships	0
Starts / Wins / Podiums / Poles / F. laps / Points; 78 / 8 / 27 / 7 / 12 / 532

Teuvo Pentti "Tepi" Länsivuori (born 9 December 1945) is a Finnish former professional motorcycle road racer. He competed in the Grand Prix world championships from 1969 to 1978.

Länsivuori's most successful seasons were in 1973 when he finished in second place to Giacomo Agostini in the 350cc World Championship, second in the 250 championship to Dieter Braun and won the Finnish round of the 1973 Formula 750 championship.

In 1976, Länsivuori competed as a privateer in the 500cc world championship to place second to his former Suzuki teammate Barry Sheene.

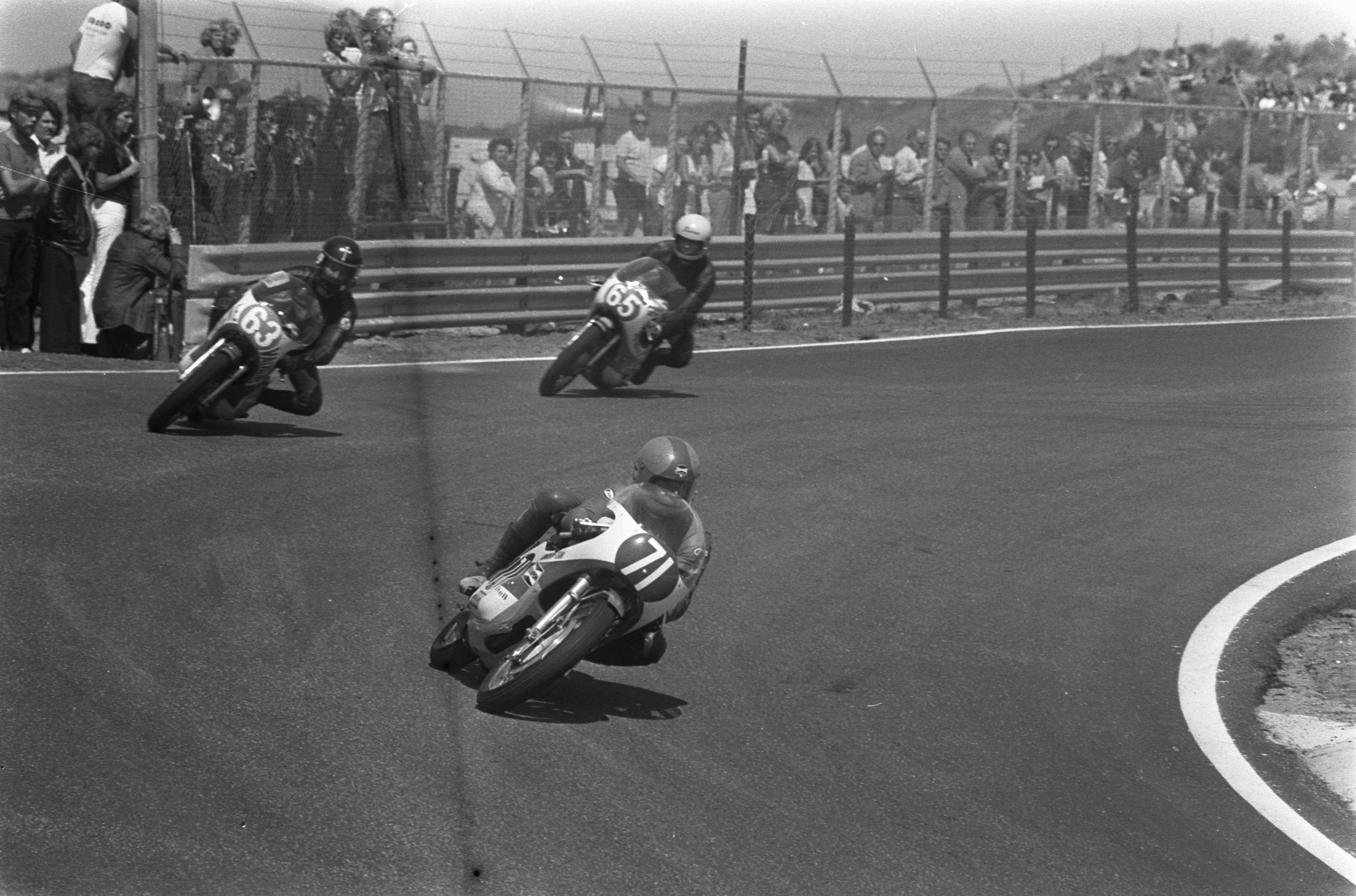
Länsivuori (71) in action during a race at the Zandvoort Circuit in 1973.

== Motorcycle Grand Prix results ==
**Position**	1	2	3	4	5	6	7	8	9	10
**Points**	15	12	10	8	6	5	4	3	2	1

(key) (Races in bold indicate pole position)

Year	Class	Team	1	2	3	4	5	6	7	8	9	10	11	12	13	Points	Rank	Wins
1969	250cc	Yamaha	ESP -	GER -	FRA -	IOM -	NED -	BEL -	DDR -	TCH -	FIN; 8	ULS -	NAT -	YUG -		3	38th	0
1970	125cc	Yamaha	GER -	FRA; 10	YUG -	IOM -	NED -	BEL -	DDR -	TCH -	FIN; 8		NAT -	ESP -		4	41st	0
1970	250cc	Yamaha	GER; 10	FRA; 12	YUG; 6	IOM -	NED -	BEL -	DDR -	TCH; 10	FIN -	ULS -	NAT -	ESP -		7	27th	0
1971	250cc	Yamaha	AUT -	GER -	IOM -	NED -	BEL -	DDR -	TCH -	SWE; 4	FIN -	ULS -	NAT -	ESP -		8	22nd	0
1971	350cc	Yamaha	AUT -	GER -	IOM -	NED -		DDR -	TCH; 10	SWE; 6	FIN -	ULS -	NAT; 6	ESP; 1		25	10th	1
1972	250cc	Yamaha	GER; 9	FRA; 6	AUT; 7	NAT; 4	IOM -	YUG -	NED; 8	BEL; 8	DDR -	TCH; 8	SWE; 5	FIN; 4	ESP; 2	46	5th	0
1972	350cc	Yamaha	GER; 6	FRA; 2	AUT; 6	NAT -	IOM -	YUG -	NED; 8		DDR; 5	TCH; 6	SWE -	FIN; 5	ESP -	42	7th	0
1973	250cc	Yamaha	FRA; 5	AUT; 4	GER; 3		IOM -	YUG -	NED -	BEL; 1	TCH; 3	SWE -	FIN; 1	ESP -		64	**2nd**	2
1973	350cc	Yamaha	FRA; 3	AUT; 3	GER; 1	NAT; 2	IOM -	YUG -	NED; 3		TCH; 1	SWE; 1	FIN -	ESP -		77	**2nd**	3
1974	350cc	Yamaha	FRA; 2	GER -	AUT -	NAT -	IOM -	NED -		SWE; 1	FIN -		YUG -	ESP -		27	6th	1
1974	500cc	Yamaha	FRA; 4	GER -	AUT -	NAT; 2	IOM -	**NED**; 2	BEL -	**SWE**; 1	FIN; 3	TCH; 3				67	**3rd**	1
1975	500cc	Suzuki	**FRA**; DNF	AUT; 2	**GER**; 3	NAT -	IOM -	NED; 5	BEL -	SWE -	FIN; 2	**TCH**; DNF				40	4th	0
1976	500cc	Suzuki	FRA; 4	AUT; DSQ	NAT; 4	IOM -	NED -	BEL; 5	**SWE**; 4	FIN; 2	**TCH**; 2	GER -				48	**2nd**	0
1977	500cc	Suzuki	VEN -	AUT -	GER -	NAT; 12	FRA; 7	NED; 7	BEL; 4	SWE -	FIN; 7	TCH; 6	GBR; 3			35	9th	0
1978	500cc	Suzuki	VEN -	ESP; 7	AUT; 5	FRA -	NAT; 7	NED -	BEL; 5	SWE; 8	FIN; 4	GBR; 5	GER; 9			39	8th	0
