= 1977 Dutch TT =

(Netherlands) 1977 Dutch TT
Race details
- Race 8 of 13 races in the 1977 Grand Prix motorcycle racing season
- Date: 25 June 1977
- Official name: Dutch TT 1977 Assen
- Location: Circuit van Drenthe
- Course: Permanent racing facility; 7.718 km (4.796 mi)

500cc
Pole position
- Rider: (United Kingdom) Barry Sheene
- Time: 2:57.400
Fastest lap
- Rider: (United Kingdom) Barry Sheene
- Time: 3:03.700
Podium
- First: (Netherlands) Wil Hartog
- Second: (United Kingdom) Barry Sheene
- Third: (United States) Pat Hennen

350cc
Pole position
- Rider: (France) Patrick Fernandez
- Time: 3:04.500
Fastest lap
- Rider: (France) Patrick Fernandez
- Time: 3:02.500
Podium
- First: (South Africa) Kork Ballington
- Second: (France) Michel Rougerie
- Third: (France) Patrick Fernandez

250cc
Pole position
- Rider: (South Africa) Alan North
- Time: 3:08.400
Fastest lap
- Rider: (Italy) Franco Uncini
- Time: 3:06.000
Podium
- First: (United Kingdom) Mick Grant
- Second: (Italy) Franco Uncini
- Third: (United Kingdom) Barry Ditchburn

125cc
Pole position
- Rider: (Italy) Pierpaolo Bianchi
- Time: 3:16.500
Fastest lap
- Rider: (Spain) Ángel Nieto
- Time: 3:16.400
Podium
- First: (Spain) Ángel Nieto
- Second: (Austria) Harald Bartol
- Third: (West Germany) Gert Bender

50cc
Pole position
- Rider: (Italy) Eugenio Lazzarini
- Time: 3:34.900
Fastest lap
- Rider: (Italy) Eugenio Lazzarini
- Time: 3:33.500
Podium
- First: (Spain) Ángel Nieto
- Second: (Spain) Ricardo Tormo
- Third: (West Germany) Herbert Rittberger

Sidecar (B2A)
Pole position
- Rider: (Switzerland) Rolf Biland
- Passenger: (United Kingdom) Kenny Williams
- Time: 3:09.200
Fastest lap
- Rider: (Switzerland) Rolf Biland
- Passenger: (United Kingdom) Kenny Williams
- Time: 3:10.500
Podium
- First rider: (Switzerland) Rolf Biland
- First passenger: (United Kingdom) Kenny Williams
- Second rider: (France) Alain Michel
- Second passenger: (France) Gérard Lecorre
- Third rider: (West Germany) Werner Schwärzel
- Third passenger: (West Germany) Andreas Huber

The 1977 Dutch TT was the eighth round of the 1977 Grand Prix motorcycle racing season. It took place on 25 June 1977 at the Circuit van Drenthe Assen. Wil Hartog became the first Dutchman to win a 500cc Grand Prix when he claimed the victory.

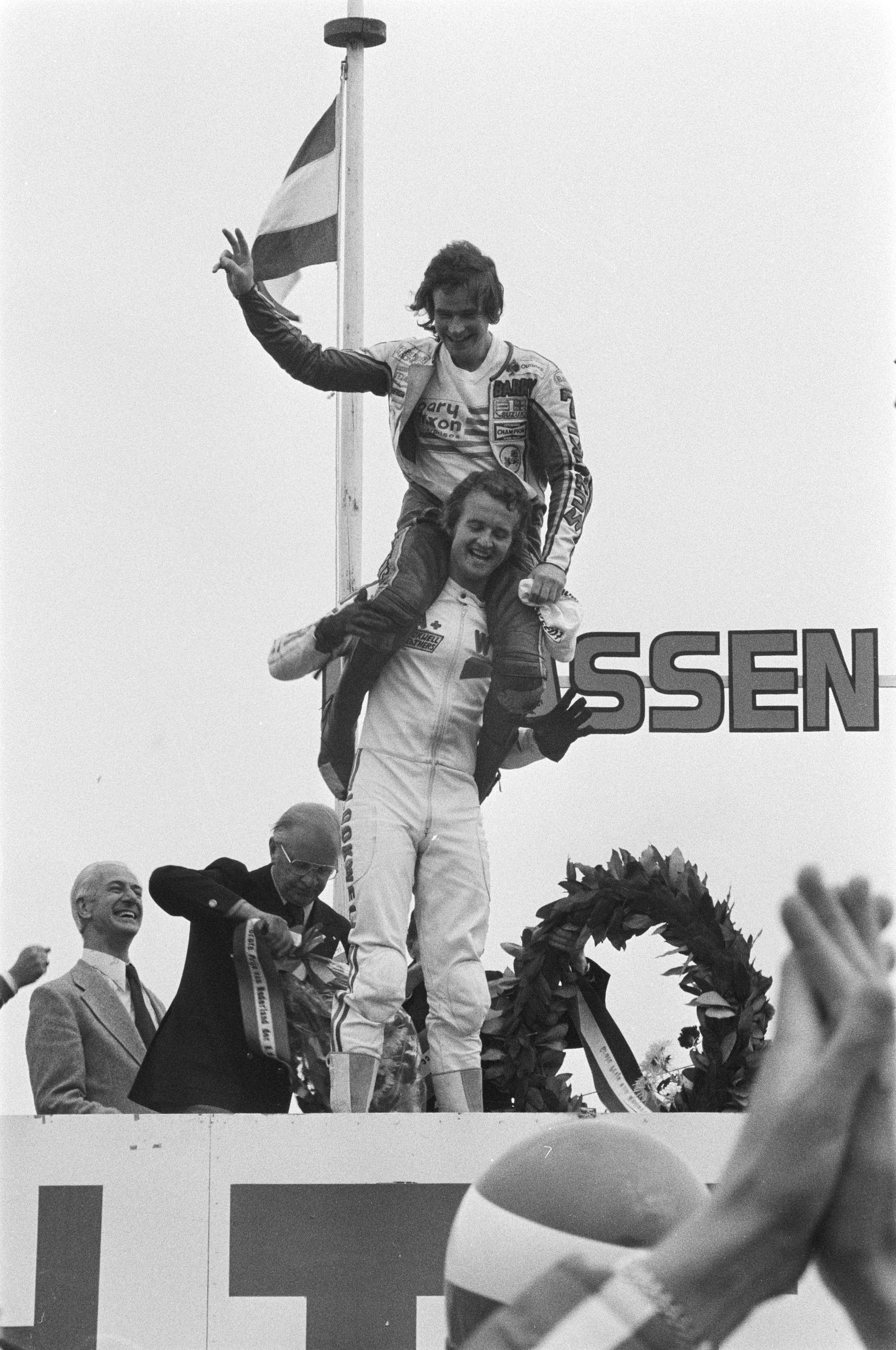
Race winner Wil Hartog, carrying second placed Barry Sheene on his shoulders on the podium of the 500cc race.

== 500cc classification ==
Pos.	No.	Rider	Team	Manufacturer	Time/Retired	Points
1	30	(Netherlands) Wil Hartog	Riemersma Racing	Suzuki	52'35.400	15
2	7	(United Kingdom) Barry Sheene	Texaco Heron Team Suzuki	Suzuki	+5.900	12
3	3	(United States) Pat Hennen	Texaco Heron Team Suzuki	Suzuki	+10.500	10
4	5	(Switzerland) Philippe Coulon	Marlboro Masche Total	Suzuki	+10.900	8
5	32	(United States) Steve Baker	Yamaha Motor Company	Yamaha	+11.600	6
6	4	(Italy) Marco Lucchinelli	Life Racing Team	Suzuki	+12.100	5
7	2	(Finland) Teuvo Länsivuori	Life Racing Team	Suzuki	+18.200	4
8	21	(France) Michel Rougerie		Suzuki	+20.300	3
9	17	(Italy) Armando Toracca	MC della Robbia	Suzuki	+21.700	2
10	18	(Italy) Virginio Ferrari	Team Nava Olio Fiat	Suzuki	+36.200	1
11	31	(Netherlands) Jack Middelburg	Haags Motocentrum Team	Suzuki	+55.400	
12	6	(United Kingdom) John Newbold	Maurice Newbold	Suzuki	+1'21.700	
13	20	(Italy) Giovanni Rolando		Suzuki	+1'46.800	
14	24	(Australia) Warren Willing		Yamaha	+2'34.900	
15	37	(South Africa) Leslie van Breda		Suzuki	+3'02.800	
16	25	(Belgium) Jean-Philippe Orban	Jean-Philippe Orban Racing Team	Suzuki	+1 lap	
17	27	(Austria) Max Wiener	MSC Rottenberg	Suzuki	+1 lap	
18	36	(Netherlands) Piet van der Wal		Yamaha	+1 lap	
Ret	42	(New Zealand) Stuart Avant	Sid Griffiths Racing	Suzuki	Retired	
Ret	??	(Netherlands) Willem Zoet		Suzuki	Accident	
Ret	12	(United Kingdom) Steve Parrish	Texaco Heron Team Suzuki	Suzuki	Retired	
Ret	15	(France) Christian Estrosi	Marlboro Masche Total	Suzuki	Accident	
Ret	11	(Italy) Giacomo Agostini	Team API Marlboro	Yamaha	Retired	
Ret	??	(West Germany) Franz Rau		Suzuki	Retired	
Ret	??	(Denmark) Børge Nielsen		Suzuki	Retired	
Ret	17	(Italy) Gianfranco Bonera	Team Nava Olio Fiat	Suzuki	Accident	
Ret	??	(United Kingdom) Dave Potter	Ted Broad	Suzuki	Retired	
Ret	43	(West Germany) Helmut Kassner	Boeri Giudici Racing Team	Suzuki	Retired	
Ret	??	(Netherlands) Dick Alblas		König	Retired	
Ret	9	(United Kingdom) John Williams	Team Appleby Glade	Suzuki	Retired	
DNS	??	(Austria) Karl Auer	MSC Rottenberg	Yamaha	Did not start	

== 350 cc classification ==
Pos	No.	Rider	Manufacturer	Laps	Time	Grid	Points
1	11	(South Africa) Kork Ballington	Yamaha	16	49:25.3	5	15
2	15	(France) Michel Rougerie	Yamaha	16	+1.2	7	12
3	16	(France) Patrick Fernandez	Yamaha	16	+1.7	1	10
4	4	(United Kingdom) Tom Herron	Yamaha	16	+3.7	9	8
5	10	(Italy) Franco Uncini	Harley-Davidson	16	+39.1	6	6
6	24	(South Africa) Jon Ekerold	Yamaha	16	+1:00.4	4	5
7	9	(France) Olivier Chevallier	Yamaha	16	+1:07.7	10	4
8	1	(Italy) Walter Villa	Harley-Davidson	16	+1:10.9		3
9	23	(South Africa) Alan North	Yamaha	16	+1:21.2	8	2
10	13	(France) Patrick Pons	Yamaha	16	+1:22.1		1
11	35	(Netherlands) Jack Middelburg	Yamaha	16	+1:27.9		
12	3	(United Kingdom) Chas Mortimer	Yamaha	16	+1:31.2		
13	17	(Germany) Helmut Kassner	Yamaha	16	+1:32.5		
14	40	(France) Jean-François Baldé	Yamaha	16	+1:32.6		
15	27	(United Kingdom) Eddie Roberts	Yamaha	16	+1:48.1		
		(Italy) Mario Lega	Morbidelli			2	
		(Australia) Vic Soussan	Yamaha			3	
		(France) Christian Sarron	Yamaha			11	
		(France) Bernard Fau	Yamaha			12	
30 starters in total, 19 finishers

== 250 cc classification ==
Pos	No.	Rider	Manufacturer	Laps	Time	Grid	Points
1	20	(United Kingdom) Mick Grant	Kawasaki	15	47:46.8	3	15
2	16	(Italy) Franco Uncini	Harley-Davidson	15	+8.6	4	12
3	21	(United Kingdom) Barry Ditchburn	Kawasaki	15	+13.2	2	10
4	1	(Italy) Walter Villa	Harley-Davidson	15	+17.8	5	8
5	14	(Italy) Mario Lega	Morbidelli	15	+19.2	6	6
6	2	(Japan) Takazumi Katayama	Yamaha	15	+25.5		5
7	12	(South Africa) Jon Ekerold	Yamaha	15	+37.5	7	4
8	3	(Finland) Pentti Korhonen	Yamaha	15	+45.3		3
9	40	(France) Philippe Bouzanne	Yamaha	15	+1:09.6		2
10	4	(United Kingdom) Tom Herron	Yamaha	15	+1:21.2	8	1
11	7	(France) Olivier Chevallier	Yamaha	15	+1:24.4		
12	18	(France) Patrick Pons	Yamaha	15	+1:28.3		
13	22	(Finland) Pekka Nurmi	Yamaha	15	+1:31.7		
14	38	(Venezuela) Aldo Nannini	Yamaha	15	+1:46.2		
15	26	(Japan) Masahiro Wada	Kawasaki	15	+1:46.5	10	
		(South Africa) Alan North	Yamaha			1	
		(South Africa) Kork Ballington	Yamaha			9	
		(France) Jean-François Baldé	Yamaha			11	
		(Australia) Vic Soussan	Yamaha			12	
30 starters in total, 20 finishers

== 125 cc classification ==
Pos	No.	Rider	Manufacturer	Laps	Time	Grid	Points
1	2	(Spain) Ángel Nieto	Bultaco	14	46:29.1	2	15
2	25	(Austria) Harald Bartol	Morbidelli	14	+51.8	4	12
3	7	(Germany) Gert Bender	Bender	14	+1:03.6	5	10
4	4	(Germany) Anton Mang	Morbidelli	14	+1:04.0	6	8
5	5	(France) Jean-Louis Guignabodet	Morbidelli	14	+1:17.2	9	6
6	8	(Switzerland) Stefan Dörflinger	Morbidelli	14	+1:24.1	8	5
7	13	(Germany) Horst Seel	Seel	14	+1:26.0	7	4
8	9	(Belgium) Julien van Zeebroeck	Morbidelli	14	+2:00.1		3
9	1	(Italy) Pierpaolo Bianchi	Morbidelli	14	+2:01.6	1	2
10	28	(Finland) Matti Kinnunen	Morbidelli	14	+2:02.0		1
11	27	(Switzerland) Hans Müller	Morbidelli	14	+2:03.2	12	
12	11	(Germany) Walter Koschine	Morbidelli	14	+2:08.4	11	
13	12	(Netherlands) Cees van Dongen	Morbidelli	14	+2:31.3		
14	29	(Netherlands) Theo van Geffen	Morbidelli	14	+2:40.9		
15	38	(Austria) Johann Parzer	Morbidelli	14	+2:44.5		
		(Italy) Eugenio Lazzarini	Morbidelli			3	
		(France) Thierry Noblesse	Morbidelli			10	
30 starters in total, 23 finishers

== 50 cc classification ==
Pos	No.	Rider	Manufacturer	Laps	Time	Grid	Points
1	1	(Spain) Ángel Nieto	Bultaco	9	32:29.8	2	15
2	26	(Spain) Ricardo Tormo	Bultaco	9	+26.9	3	12
3	2	(Germany) Herbert Rittberger	Kreidler	9	+48.9	4	10
4	4	(Italy) Eugenio Lazzarini	Kreidler	9	+56.4	1	8
5	7	(Switzerland) Stefan Dörflinger	Kreidler	9	+58.6	7	6
6	9	(France) Patrick Plisson	ABF	9	+1:19.7	6	5
7	16	(Germany) Wolfgang Müller	Kreidler	9	+1:51.0	11	4
8	18	(Germany) Hagen Klein	Kreidler	9	+1:51.1	9	3
9	8	(Austria) Hans Hummel	Kreidler	9	+2:21.4		2
10	32	(Netherlands) Peter Looyestein	Kreidler	9	+2:21.5		1
11	17	(Germany) Ingo Emmerich	Kreidler	9	+2:28.7		
12	29	(Netherlands) Ton Koojiman	Hemeyla	9	+2:40.9	10	
13	31	(Netherlands) Theo van Geffen	VGS	9	+2:51.0		
14	15	(Germany) Günter Schirnhofer	Kreidler	9	+3:01.2		
15	36	(Belgium) Pierre Dumont	Kreidler	9	+3:02.2		
		(Netherlands) Jaap Bosman	Kreidler			5	
		(Netherlands) Engelbert Kip	Kreidler			8	
		(Switzerland) Rudolf Kunz	Kreidler			12	
29 starters in total, 16 finishers

== Sidecar classification ==
Pos	No.	Rider	Passenger	Manufacturer	Laps	Time	Grid	Points
1	4	(Switzerland) Rolf Biland	(United Kingdom) Kenny Williams	Schmid-Yamaha	14	45:12.4	1	15
2	8	(France) Alain Michel	(France) Gérard Lecorre	Yamaha	14	+14.5	2	12
3	2	(Germany) Werner Schwärzel	(Germany) Andreas Huber	Aro	14	+1:00.6	3	10
4	19	(Sweden) Göte Brodin	(Sweden) Eric Wickström	Windle-Yamaha	14	+1:22.2	8	8
5	10	(Switzerland) Bruno Holzer	(Switzerland) Charly Meierhans	LCR-Yamaha	14	+1:23.7	7	6
6	6	(United Kingdom) Dick Greasley	(United Kingdom) Mick Skeels	Chell-Yamaha	14	+1:41.7	10	5
7	3	(Switzerland) Hermann Schmid	(Switzerland) Jean-Petit Matille	Schmid-Yamaha	14	+1:58.8	6	4
8	23	(Netherlands) Cees Smit	(Netherlands) Jan Smit	König	14	+2:09.0	5	3
9	5	(Germany) Helmut Schilling	(Germany) Rainer Gundel	Aro	14	+2:19.0	9	2
10	15	(United Kingdom) Mac Hobson	(United Kingdom) Stu Collins	Yamaha	14	+2:46.0		1
11	17	(Germany) Siegfried Schauzu	(Germany) Lorenzo Puzo	Yamaha	14	+3:04.3		
12	25	(Germany) Max Venus	(Germany) Norman Bittermann	König	14	+3:12.4		
		(United Kingdom) George O'Dell	(United Kingdom) Cliff Holland	Seymaz-Yamaha			4	
25 starters in total, 14 finishers

Previous race: 1977 Yugoslavian Grand Prix	FIM Grand Prix World Championship; 1977 season	Next race: 1977 Belgian Grand Prix
Previous race: 1976 Dutch TT	Dutch TT	Next race: 1978 Dutch TT
