= 1977 Nations motorcycle Grand Prix =

(Italy) 1977 Nations Grand Prix
Race details
- Race 4 of 13 races in the 1977 Grand Prix motorcycle racing season
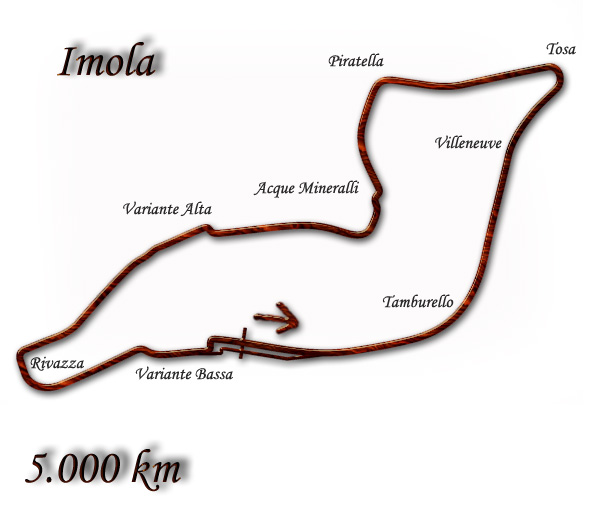
- Date: 15 May 1977
- Official name: Gran Premio delle Nazioni
- Location: Autodromo Dino Ferrari
- Course: Permanent racing facility; 5.040 km (3.132 mi)

500cc
Pole position
- Rider: (United Kingdom) Barry Sheene
- Time: 1:58.410
Fastest lap
- Rider: (United Kingdom) Barry Sheene
- Time: 1:57.000
Podium
- First: (United Kingdom) Barry Sheene
- Second: (Italy) Virginio Ferrari
- Third: (Italy) Armando Toracca

350cc
Pole position
- Rider: (South Africa) Alan North
- Time: 2:01.570
Fastest lap
- Rider: (Italy) Mario Lega
- Time: 2:01.000
Podium
- First: (South Africa) Alan North
- Second: (Italy) Mario Lega
- Third: (Japan) Takazumi Katayama

250cc
Pole position
- Rider: (Italy) Franco Uncini
- Time: 2:05.840
Fastest lap
- Rider: (Italy) Franco Uncini
- Time: 2:03.300
Podium
- First: (Italy) Franco Uncini
- Second: (Italy) Mario Lega
- Third: (United Kingdom) Barry Ditchburn

125cc
Pole position
Rider	(Italy) Pierpaolo Bianchi	
Time	2:09.340	
Fastest lap
Rider	(Italy) Pierpaolo Bianchi	
Time	2:09.700	
Podium
First	(Italy) Pierpaolo Bianchi	
Second	(Italy) Eugenio Lazzarini	Morbidelli
Third	(Italy) Maurizio Massimiani	

50cc
Pole position
- Rider: (Italy) Eugenio Lazzarini
- Time: 2:25.730
Fastest lap
- Rider: (Italy) Eugenio Lazzarini
Podium
- First: (Italy) Eugenio Lazzarini
- Second: (Spain) Ricardo Tormo
- Third: (Spain) Ángel Nieto

The 1977 Nations motorcycle Grand Prix was the fourth round of the 1977 Grand Prix motorcycle racing season. It took place on 15 May 1977 at the Autodromo Dino Ferrari.

== 500cc classification ==
Pos.	No.	Rider	Team	Manufacturer	Time/Retired	Points
1	7	(United Kingdom) Barry Sheene	Texaco Heron Team Suzuki	Suzuki	59'52.000	15
2	22	(Italy) Virginio Ferrari	Team Nava Olio Fiat	Suzuki	+1.300	12
3	46	(Italy) Armando Toracca	MC della Robbia	Suzuki	+2.600	10
4	32	(United States) Steve Baker	Yamaha Motor Company	Yamaha	+28.600	8
5	1	(Italy) Giacomo Agostini	Team API Marlboro	Yamaha	+35.800	6
6	6	(Switzerland) Philippe Coulon	Marlboro Masche Total	Suzuki	+36.900	5
7	5	(United Kingdom) John Newbold	Maurice Newbold	Suzuki	+1'10.500	4
8	20	(France) Christian Estrosi	Marlboro Masche Total	Suzuki	+1'14.500	3
9	24	(Netherlands) Boet van Dulmen	Pullshaw	Suzuki	+1'16.400	2
10	26	(Germany) Anton Mang	Valvoline Racing Hamburg	Suzuki	+1'22.300	1
11	19	(United Kingdom) Steve Parrish	Texaco Heron Team Suzuki	Suzuki	+1'39.700	
12	2	(Finland) Teuvo Länsivuori	Life Racing Team	Suzuki	+1'40.400	
13	36	(Italy) Graziano Rossi		Suzuki	+1'45.700	
14	4	(Austria) Max Wiener	MSC Rottenberg	Suzuki	+1'55.600	
15	23	(United Kingdom) Alex George	Hermetite Racing International	Suzuki	+1 lap	
16	9	(United Kingdom) John Williams	Team Appleby Glade	Suzuki	+1 lap	
17	18	(Belgium) Jean-Philippe Orban	Jean-Philippe Orban Racing Team	Suzuki	+2 laps	
18	41	(Italy) Mario Necchi		Suzuki	+2 laps	
Ret	??	(Italy) Nico Cereghini	Life Racing Team	Suzuki	Accident	
Ret	8	(Australia) Jack Findlay	Hermetite Racing International	Suzuki	Accident	
Ret	??	(Italy) Giovanni Rolando		Suzuki	Retired	
Ret	??	(Denmark) Børge Nielsen		Suzuki	Retired	
Ret	3	(United States) Pat Hennen	Texaco Heron Team Suzuki	Suzuki	Accident	
Ret	??	(United States) Ricky Romeri		Yamaha	Retired	
Ret	4	(Italy) Marco Lucchinelli	Life Racing Team	Suzuki	Retired	
Ret	32	(Italy) Gianfranco Bonera	Team Nava Olio Fiat	Suzuki	Retired	
Ret	42	(New Zealand) Stuart Avant	Sid Griffiths Racing	Suzuki	Retired	
DNS	??	(France) Michel Rougerie		Suzuki	Did not start	
DNS	??	(France) Bernard Fau		Suzuki	Did not start	
DNS	45	(Netherlands) Wil Hartog	Riemersma Racing	Suzuki	Did not start	

== 350 cc classification ==
Pos	No.	Rider	Manufacturer	Laps	Time	Grid	Points
1	30	(South Africa) Alan North	Yamaha	26	53:12.2	1	15
2	51	(Italy) Mario Lega	Morbidelli	26	+1.7	2	12
3	8	(Japan) Takazumi Katayama	Yamaha	26	+23.7	4	10
4	34	(France) Michel Rougerie	Yamaha	26	+24.6	5	8
5	7	(Switzerland) Bruno Kneubühler	Yamaha	26	+1:07.1	6	6
6	10	(Italy) Franco Uncini	Harley-Davidson	26	+1:15.2	17	5
7	1	(Italy) Walter Villa	Harley-Davidson	26	+1:15.7	15	4
8	46	(Italy) Felice Agostini	Yamaha	26	+1:29.9	12	3
9	14	(France) Denis Boulom	Yamaha	26	+1:41.8	16	2
10	3	(United Kingdom) Chas Mortimer	Yamaha	26	+1:48.2		1
11	63	(Switzerland) Michel Frutschi	Yamaha	26	+1:50.3		
12	9	(France) Olivier Chevallier	Yamaha	25	+1 lap	13	
13	44	(Japan) Ken Nemoto	Yamaha	25	+1 lap		
14	58	(Italy) Giorgio Avveduti	Yamaha	25	+1 lap		
15	15	(Czechoslovakia) Peter Baláz	Yamaha	23	+3 laps		
		(South Africa) Kork Ballington	Yamaha			3	
		(Italy) Giacomo Agostini	Yamaha			7	
		(United Kingdom) Tom Herron	Yamaha			8	
		(Finland) Pekka Nurmi	Yamaha			9	
		(Italy) Giovanni Pelletier	Bimota			10	
		(France) Christian Sarron	Yamaha			11	
		(Italy) Raffaele Palatiello	Bimota			14	
		(Italy) Vanes Francini	Yamaha			18	
		(Italy) Alfio Micheli	Yamaha			19	
		(Italy) Massimo Matteoni	Bimota			20	
30 starters in total

== 250 cc classification ==
Pos	No.	Rider	Manufacturer	Laps	Time	Grid	Points
1	24	(Italy) Franco Uncini	Harley-Davidson	24	50:12.7	1	15
2	6	(Italy) Mario Lega	Morbidelli	24	+9.1	10	12
3	27	(United Kingdom) Barry Ditchburn	Kawasaki	24	+30.7	7	10
4	5	(United Kingdom) Tom Herron	Yamaha	24	+39.0	13	8
5	44	(South Africa) Alan North	Yamaha	24	+50.9	5	6
6	16	(South Africa) Jon Ekerold	Yamaha	24	+55.3	16	5
7	18	(France) Jean-François Baldé	Kawasaki	24	+58.8	9	5
8	2	(Japan) Takazumi Katayama	Yamaha	24	+1:19.2		4
9	68	(Australia) Vic Soussan	Yamaha	24	+1:28.2	18	2
10	49	(Italy) Vanes Francini	Yamaha	24	+1:29.2	17	1
11	58	(Italy) Sauro Pazzaglia	Yamaha	24	+1:30.1	20	
12	34	(Italy) Franco Solaroli	Harley-Davidson	24	+1:51.9		
13	64	(Switzerland) Michel Frutschi	Yamaha	24	+1:52.0	14	
14	26	(Finland) Pekka Nurmi	Yamaha	24	+1:54.5	12	
15	47	(Italy) Pierluigi Conforti	Yamaha	24	+1:58.8		
16	20	(France) Philippe Bouzanne	Yamaha	23	+1 lap		
17	30	(Sweden) Leif Gustafsson	Yamaha	23	+1 lap		
18	11	(Australia) John Dodds	Yamaha	23	+1 lap		
		(Italy) Walter Villa	Harley-Davidson			2	
		(France) Christian Sarron	Yamaha			3	
		(Switzerland) Hans Müller	Yamaha			4	
		(Japan) Akihiko Kiyohara	Kawasaki			6	
		(Switzerland) Bruno Kneubühler	Yamaha			8	
		(Venezuela) Aldo Nannini	Yamaha			11	
		(Italy) Giovanni Pelletier	Bimota			15	
		(Italy) Vinicio Salmi	Yamaha			19	
30 starters in total

== 125 cc classification ==
Pos	No.	Rider	Manufacturer	Laps	Time	Grid	Points
1	1	(Italy) Pierpaolo Bianchi	Morbidelli	21	45:58.7	1	15
2	7	(Italy) Eugenio Lazzarini	Morbidelli	21	+55.8	3	12
3	32	(Italy) Maurizio Massimiani	Morbidelli	21	+1:13.5	6	10
4	5	(Germany) Anton Mang	Morbidelli	21	+1:16.3	5	8
5	2	(Spain) Ángel Nieto	Bultaco	21	+1:28.2	2	6
6	27	(Italy) Sauro Pazzaglia	Morbidelli	21	+1:41.2	7	5
7	18	(Switzerland) Hans Müller	Morbidelli	21	+1:46.6	8	4
8	6	(France) Jean-Louis Guignabodet	Morbidelli	21	+1:48.9	20	3
9	9	(Switzerland) Stefan Dörflinger	Morbidelli	21	+1:51.5	9	2
10	40	(Italy) Pieraldo Cipriani	Morbidelli	21	+2:06.9	12	1
11	35	(Italy) Luciano Richetti	Morbidelli	21	+2:13.8		
12	8	(Germany) Gert Bender	Bender	21	+2:15.7		
13	29	(Italy) Guido Mancini	Morbidelli	20	+1 lap	16	
14	41	(Italy) F. Pellegrino	Morbidelli	20	+1 lap		
15	52	(France) Patrick Plisson	Morbidelli	20	+1 lap		
16	24	(Italy) Enrico Cereda	Morbidelli	20	+1 lap		
17	27	(Italy) R. Brazzi	Morbidelli	20	+1 lap		
18	44	(Italy) Luigi Rinaudo	Morbidelli	18	+3 laps		
		(Italy) Giovanni Ziggliotto	Morbidelli			4	
		(Italy) Germano Zanetti	Morbidelli			10	
		(Austria) Harald Bartol	Morbidelli			11	
		(Austria) Johann Parzer	Morbidelli			13	
		(Finland) Matti Kinnunen	Morbidelli			14	
		(Switzerland) Rolf Blatter	Morbidelli			15	
		(Italy) Claudio Lusuardi	Morbidelli			17	
		(Hungary) János Drapál	Morbidelli			18	
		(Italy) Carlo Vernocchi	Morbidelli			19	
30 starters in total

== 50 cc classification ==
Pos	No.	Rider	Manufacturer	Laps	Time	Grid	Points
1	4	(Italy) Eugenio Lazzarini	Kreidler	13	31:40.6	1	15
2	19	(Spain) Ricardo Tormo	Bultaco	13	+1.4	3	12
3	1	(Spain) Ángel Nieto	Bultaco	13	+12.1	2	10
4	2	(Germany) Herbert Rittberger	Kreidler	13	+1:27.8	5	8
5	7	(Switzerland) Rolf Blatter	Kreidler	13	+1:28.4	9	6
6	3	(Switzerland) Ulrich Graf	Kreidler	13	+1:36.7	6	5
7	8	(Switzerland) Stefan Dörflinger	Kreidler	13	+1:51.5	4	4
8	45	(France) Patrick Plisson	ABF	13	+1:55.4	8	3
9	25	(Italy) Ezio Mischiatti	Derbi	13	+1:56.5	10	2
10	11	(Italy) Aldo Pero	Kreidler	13	+1:58.7	19	1
11	9	(Austria) Hans Hummel	Kreidler	13	+2:14.3	14	
12	29	(Italy) Guido Mancini	Kreidler	13	+2:27.3	7	
13	5	(Switzerland) Rudolf Kunz	Kreidler	12	+1 lap		
14	35	(Netherlands) Engelbert Kip	Kreidler	12	+1 lap	16	
15	30	(Italy) Giorgio Paci	Derbi	12	+1 lap	18	
16	16	(Spain) Ramón Gali	Derbi	12	+1 lap		
17	44	(Italy) Claudio Granata	Derbi	12	+1 lap	17	
18	37	(Germany) Günter Schirnhofer	Kreidler	12	+1 lap		
19	33	(Italy) Giuliano Tabanelli	Silvestri	12	+1 lap	20	
20	22	(Italy) Giovanni Lucarini	UFO	12	+1 lap		
NC	23	(Italy) Giorgio Macchiavelli	UFO	7	+6 laps		
		(Italy) Alberto Ieva	Ringhini			11	
		(Germany) Hagen Klein	Kreidler			12	
		(Italy) Claudio Lusuardi	Lusuardi			13	
		(France) Jean-Louis Guignabodet	Morbidelli			15	
30 starters in total

Previous race: 1977 German Grand Prix	FIM Grand Prix World Championship; 1977 season	Next race: 1977 Spanish Grand Prix
Previous race: 1976 Nations Grand Prix	Nations Grand Prix	Next race: 1978 Nations Grand Prix
