= Alan North (motorcyclist) =

South African motorcycle racer

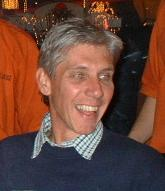
- Nationality: South African
Motorcycle racing career statistics
Grand Prix motorcycle racing
Active years	1975 – 1977, 1979 – 1983
First race	1975 500cc Dutch TT
Last race	1983 500cc British Grand Prix
First win	1977 350 cc Nations Grand Prix
Last win	1977 350 cc Nations Grand Prix
Starts / Wins / Podiums / Poles / F. laps / Points; 32 / 1 / 5 / 6 / 1 / 144

Alan North (born 15 August 1953), is a South African former professional Grand Prix motorcycle road racer. His best year was in 1982 when he finished the season in sixth place in the 350 cc world championship. He won his only Grand Prix race in 1977, claiming the 350 cc 1977 Nations Grand Prix at Imola.

North was born in Durban, South Africa. His parents were heavily involved in Natal motorsport in the early days of Roy Hesketh Circuit. His father was chairman of NMCC, and before that his grandfather also.

When North turned 16, he began his racing career on 50 cc bikes on the karting tracks, and at club meetings at the Roy Hesketh Circuit. North raced at the Roy Hesketh Circuit from 1969 through to the end of 1974, moving up the ranks from 50 cc to 750 cc during those years.
