= Gianfranco Bonera =

Italian motorcycle racer

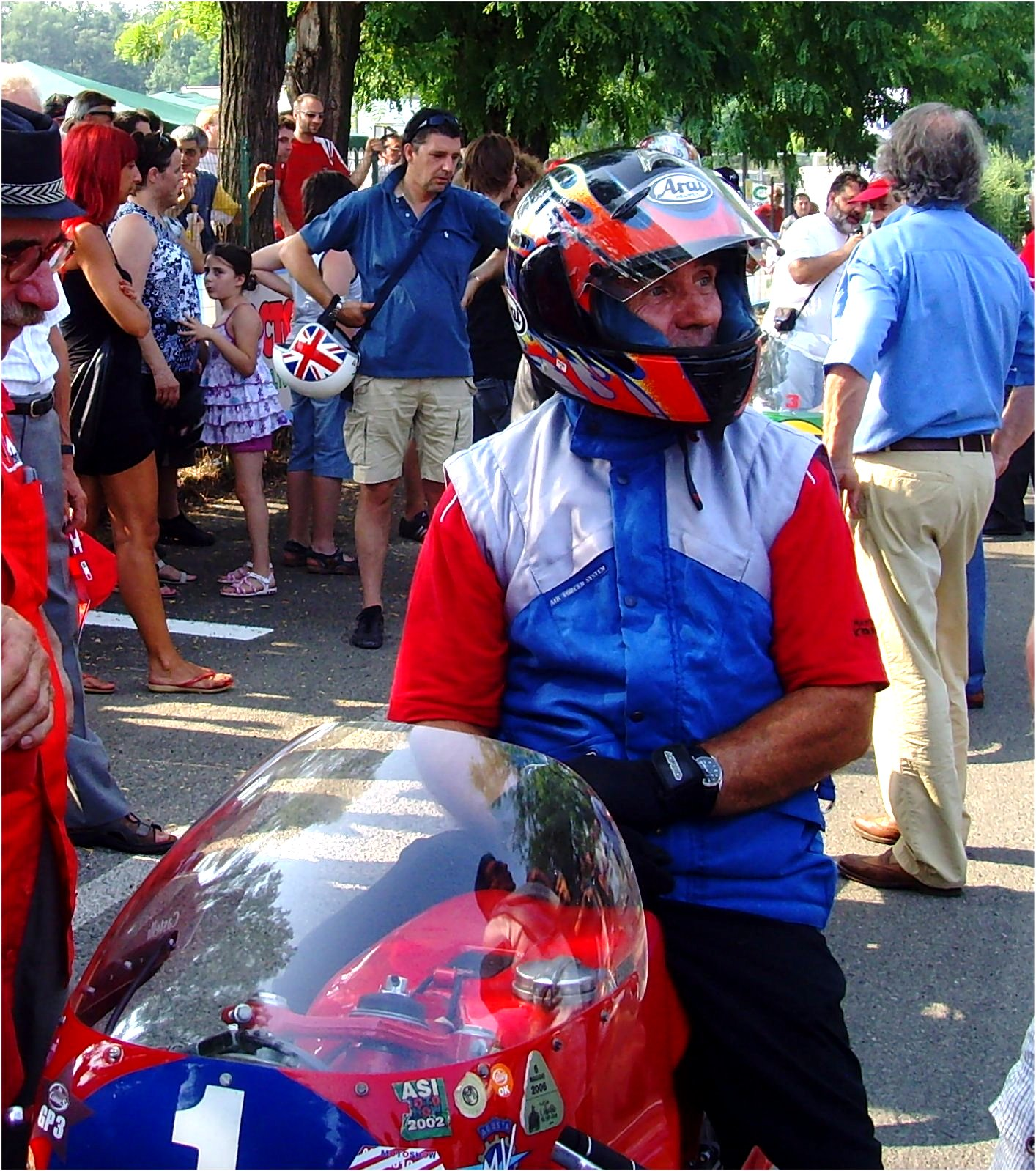
- Bonera in 2010 on a 350 cc MV Agusta.
- Nationality: Italian
- Born: 2 April 1945 (age 81)
Motorcycle racing career statistics
Grand Prix motorcycle racing
| Active years | 1973 - 1980 |
| First race | 1973 500cc Yugoslavian Grand Prix |
| Last race | 1980 500cc Nations Grand Prix |
| First win | 1974 500cc Nations Grand Prix |
| Last win | 1976 250cc Spanish Grand Prix |
| Team(s) | MV Agusta, Harley-Davidson |
Starts / Wins / Podiums / Poles / F. laps / Points; 38 / 2 / 15 / 1 / 5 / 254

Gianfranco Bonera (born 2 April 1945 in Porpetto, Province of Udine) is an Italian former Grand Prix motorcycle road racer. His best year was in 1974 when he won the Nations Grand Prix and finished second to his MV Agusta teammate, Phil Read, in the 500cc world championship. He switched to the 250cc class in 1976, racing for the Harley-Davidson factory racing team on Aermacchi machines rebadged after being purchased by the American firm. He won the 250cc Spanish Grand Prix and finished the season in third place behind his Harley-Davidson teammate, Walter Villa and Yamaha's Takazumi Katayama.

== Grand Prix motorcycle racing results ==
Points system from 1969 onwards:

| **Position** | 1 | 2 | 3 | 4 | 5 | 6 | 7 | 8 | 9 | 10 |
| **Points** | 15 | 12 | 10 | 8 | 6 | 5 | 4 | 3 | 2 | 1 |

(key) (Races in bold indicate pole position; races in italics indicate fastest lap)

| Year | Class | Team | 1 | 2 | 3 | 4 | 5 | 6 | 7 | 8 | 9 | 10 | 11 | 12 | 13 | Points | Rank | Wins |
|---|---|---|---|---|---|---|---|---|---|---|---|---|---|---|---|---|---|---|
| 1973 | 350cc | Harley-Davidson | FRA - | AUT - | GER - | NAT - | IOM - | YUG - | NED - | | CZE; 4 | SWE - | FIN - | ESP - | | 8 | 23rd | 0 |
| 1973 | 500cc | Harley-Davidson | FRA - | AUT - | GER - | | IOM - | YUG; 3 | NED - | BEL - | CZE - | SWE - | FIN - | ESP - | | 10 | 19th | 0 |
| 1974 | 500cc | MV Agusta | FRA; 3 | GER - | AUT; 2 | NAT; 1 | IOM - | NED; 4 | BEL; 10 | SWE; 4 | FIN; 2 | CZE; 2 | | | | 69 | 2nd | 1 |
| 1975 | 500cc | MV Agusta | FRA - | AUT - | GER - | NAT - | IOM - | NED; 6 | BEL - | SWE; 4 | **FIN**; NC | CZE - | | | | 13 | 15th | 0 |
| 1976 | 250cc | Harley-Davidson | FRA; 2 | | NAT - | YUG; 7 | IOM - | NED; 4 | BEL; 5 | SWE; 3 | FIN; 3 | CZE; 2 | GER - | ESP; 1 | | 61 | 3rd | 1 |
| 1976 | 350cc | Harley-Davidson | FRA - | AUT; 10 | NAT - | YUG - | IOM - | NED - | | | FIN - | CZE; 7 | GER; 3 | ESP - | | 15 | 15th | 0 |
| 1977 | 500cc | Suzuki | VEN; DNF | AUT - | GER; 12 | NAT; DNF | FRA; 4 | NED; DNF | BEL; DNF | SWE; 6 | FIN; 3 | CZE; 5 | GBR; 4 | | | 37 | 7th | 0 |
| 1978 | 350cc | Yamaha | VEN; 8 | | AUT; 10 | FRA - | NAT - | NED; 2 | | SWE - | FIN - | GBR; 5 | GER; 8 | CZE - | YUG; 2 | 37 | 7th | 0 |
| 1978 | 500cc | Suzuki | VEN - | ESP - | AUT; 9 | FRA - | NAT - | NED - | BEL - | SWE - | FIN - | GBR - | GER; 12 | | | 2 | 26th | 0 |
| 1979 | 350cc | Yamaha | VEN - | AUT - | GER - | NAT - | ESP - | YUG; 10 | NED; 10 | FIN - | GBR - | CZE - | FRA - | | | 2 | 36th | 0 |
| 1980 | 500cc | Yamaha | NAT; 12 | ESP - | FRA - | NED - | BEL - | FIN - | GBR - | GER - | | | | | | 0 | - | 0 |
