= Rolf Blatter =

Swiss motorcycle racer

- Nationality: Swiss
- Born: 18 February 1951 (age 75)
Motorcycle racing career statistics
Grand Prix motorcycle racing
Active years	1973 - 1982
First race	1973 50cc German Grand Prix
Last race	1982 50cc Spanish Grand Prix
Starts / Wins / Podiums / Poles / F. laps / Points; 39 / 0 / 7 / 0 / 0 / 210

Rolf Blatter (born 18 February 1951) is a former Grand Prix motorcycle road racer from Switzerland. His most successful year was in 1979 when he finished in second place in the 50cc world championship. Blatter also won both the 50cc Swiss championship in 1972 and the 125cc Swiss championship in 1985.

== Motorcycle Grand Prix results ==
Position	1	2	3	4	5	6	7	8	9	10
Points	15	12	10	8	6	5	4	3	2	1

Year	Class	Team	1	2	3	4	5	6	7	8	9	10	11	12	13	14	Points	Rank
1973	50cc	Kreidler			GER; 10	NAT -		YUG -	DUT -	BEL -		SWE -		SPA -			1	28th
1974	50cc	Kreidler	FRE -	GER -		NAT -		DUT -	BEL -	SWE -	FIN -	CZE; 10	YUG; 8	SPA -			4	22nd
1975	50cc	Kreidler		SPA -		GER -	NAT -		DUT -	BEL -	SWE -	FIN; 7		YUG -			4	18th
1976	50cc	Kreidler	FRE; Ret		NAT; 6	YUG; 9		DUT; Ret	BEL; 14	SWE; 10	FIN; 7		GER; 5	SPA; 4			26	7th
1976	125cc	Morbidelli			AUS -	NAT -	YUG; 7		DUT -	BEL -	SWE -	FIN -		GER -	SPA -		4	27th
1977	50cc	Kreidler			GER -	NAT; 5	SPA -		YUG -	DUT -	BEL -	SWE -					6	17th
1977	125cc	Morbidelli	VEN -	AUS; 9	GER; 8	NAT -	SPA -	FRE -	YUG -	DUT -	BEL -	SWE -	FIN -		GBR -		5	23rd
1978	50cc	Kreidler		SPA; 13			NAT; 4	DUT; 8	BEL; Ret				GER; 5	CZE; Ret	YUG; 4		25	5th
1978	125cc	Morbidelli	VEN -	SPA -	AUS -	FRE -	NAT -	DUT -	BEL; 8	SWE -	FIN -	GBR -	GER -		YUG -		3	27th
1979	50cc	Kreidler			GER; 4	NAT; 2	SPA; 3	YUG; 2	DUT; 3	BEL; Ret					FRE; 3		62	2nd
1979	125cc	Morbidelli	VEN -	AUS; 7	GER -	NAT -	SPA -	YUG -	DUT -	BEL -	SWE -	FIN -	GBR -	CZE; 7	FRE -		8	26th
1980	50cc	Kreidler	NAT; Ret	SPA; 4		YUG; Ret	DUT; 8	BEL; 8				GER; Ret					14	11th
1980	125cc	Morbidelli	NAT; 10	SPA; 6	FRE -	YUG -	DUT -	BEL -	FIN -	GBR -	CZE; 9	GER -					8	18th
1981	50cc	Kreidler			GER; Ret	NAT; Ret		SPA; 5	YUG; 3	DUT; 3	BEL; 4	SMR; Ret				CZE; 6	39	6th
1982	50cc	Kreidler				SPA; 9	NAT -	DUT -		YUG -					SMR -	GER -	2	17th
