= Jon Ekerold =

South African motorcycle racer

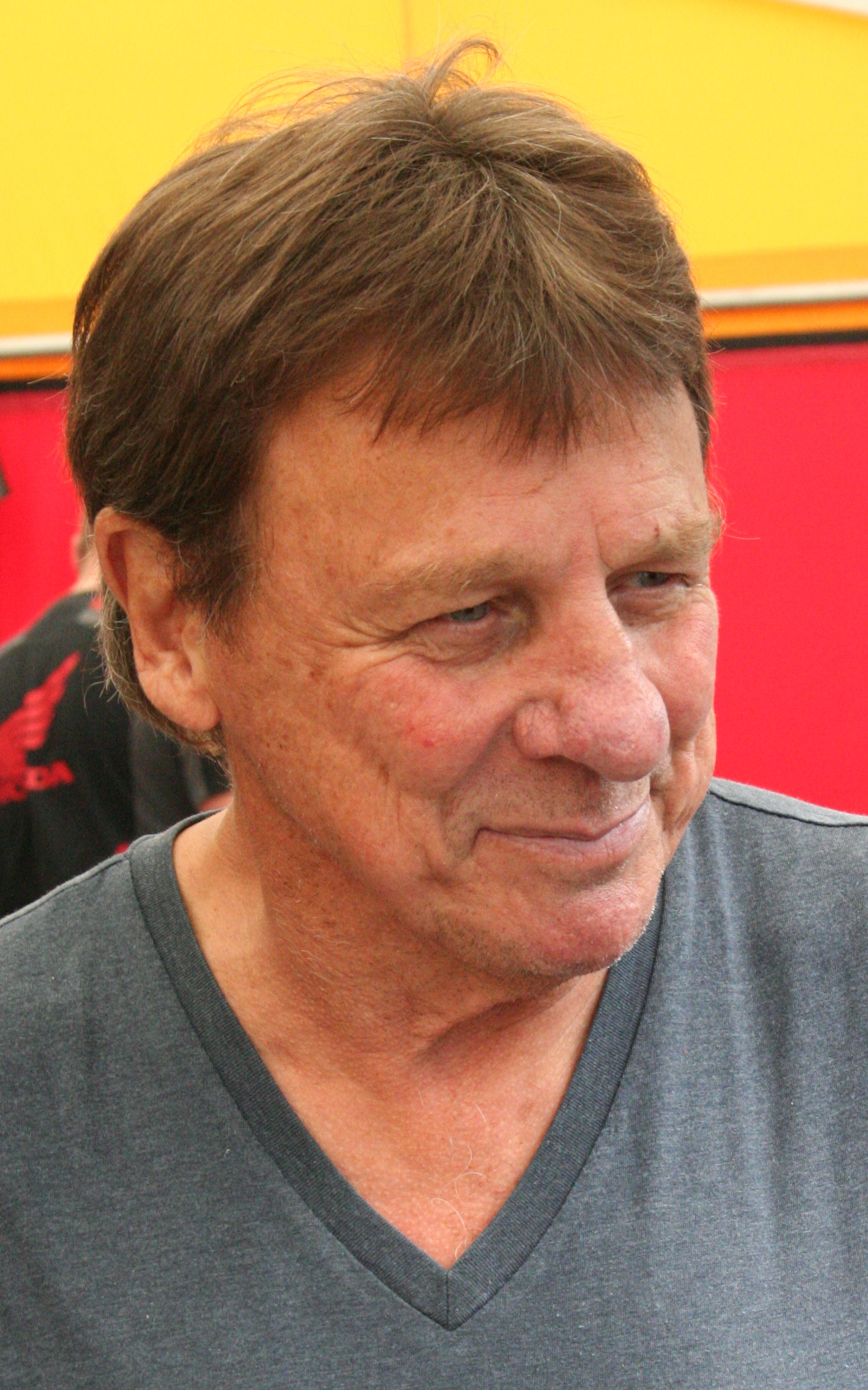
- Nationality: South African
- Born: 8 October 1946 (age 80); Johannesburg, South Africa
Motorcycle racing career statistics
Grand Prix motorcycle racing
Active years	1975–1983
First race	1975 350cc Austrian Grand Prix
Last race	1983 500cc San Marino Grand Prix
First win	1977 250cc French Grand Prix
Last win	1981 350cc Nations Grand Prix
Team	Cagiva
Championships	350cc – 1980
Starts / Wins / Podiums / Poles / F. laps / Points; 56 / 7 / 19 / 2 / 3

Jonathan "Jon" Ekerold (born 8 October 1946) is a South African former professional motorcycle racer. He competed in the Grand Prix motorcycle racing world championships from 1975 to 1983

Born in Johannesburg, South Africa, Ekerold is one of the few racers in the modern era to have won a road racing world championship as a privateer without the benefit of a motorcycle manufacturer's support when he defeated Kawasaki factory racing team rider Anton Mang for the 1980 350cc Grand Prix road racing world championship. Ekerold rode a self-modified Yamaha TZ350 engine in a Bimota chassis during his championship season. He also won the Ulster Grand Prix once and finished second at the Isle of Man TT twice.

== Motorcycle Grand Prix results ==
**Position**	1	2	3	4	5	6	7	8	9	10
**Points**	15	12	10	8	6	5	4	3	2	1

(key) (Races in bold indicate pole position; races in italics indicate fastest lap)

Year	Class	Team	1	2	3	4	5	6	7	8	9	10	11	12	13	Points	Rank	Wins
1975	350cc	Yamaha	FRA -	ESP -	AUT; 2	GER -	NAT -	IOM -	NED; 10	FIN -	CZE -	YUG -				13	16th	0
1976	250cc	Yamaha	FRA -		NAT -	YUG -	IOM; NC	NED; 12	BEL -	SWE; 11	FIN; 14	CZE -	GER; 3	ESP -		10	15th	0
1976	350cc	Yamaha	FRA -	AUT -	NAT -	YUG -	IOM; NC	NED -			FIN; 7	CZE -	GER -	ESP -		4	30th	0
1976	500cc	Yamaha	FRA -	AUT -	NAT -		IOM; 6	NED -	BEL -	SWE -	FIN -	CZE -	GER -			5	29th	0
1977	250cc	Yamaha	VEN -	GER -	NAT; 6	ESP -	FRA; 1	YUG; 8	NED; 7	BEL; 10	SWE; 3	FIN; 12	CZE; 7	GBR -		42	9th	1
1977	350cc	Yamaha	VEN -	GER -	NAT -	ESP; 6	**FRA**; 2	YUG; 2	NED; 6		SWE; 4	FIN; 3	CZE; 9	GBR -		54	**3rd**	0
1978	250cc	Yamaha	VEN -	ESP; 5		FRA; 4	NAT -	NED -	BEL -	SWE; 4	FIN; 10	GBR -	GER; 6	CZE; 5	YUG; 5	40	9th	0
1978	350cc	Yamaha	VEN -		AUT; 4	FRA; 3	NAT -	NED; 3	BEL -	SWE; 4	FIN; 5	GBR -	GER; 4	CZE; 4	YUG; 5	64	4th	0
1979	250cc	Yamaha	VEN -		GER; 4	NAT -	ESP -	YUG -	NED -	BEL -	SWE -	FIN -	GBR -	CZE -	FRA -	8	22nd	0
1979	350cc	Yamaha	VEN; 5	AUT; 2	GER; 1	NAT -	ESP -	YUG -	NED -			FIN -	GBR; 10	CZE -	FRA -	34	8th	1
1980	350cc	Bimota-Yamaha	NAT; 6	FRA; 1	NED; 1	GBR; 2	CZE; 10	GER; 1								63	**1st**	3
1981	350cc	Bimota-Yamaha	ARG; 1	AUT; 3	GER -	NAT; 1	YUG; 2	NED -	GBR -	CZE -						52	**2nd**	2
1982	500cc	Cagiva	ARG -	AUT; 12	FRA -	ESP -	NAT -	NED -	BEL -	YUG -	GBR; 13	SWE -	RSM -	GER; 10		1	28th	0
1983	500cc	Cagiva	RSA; 17	FRA; 19	NAT -	GER -	ESP -	AUT -	YUG -	NED; NC	BEL -	GBR -	SWE -	RSM; 24		0	-	0
