= Walter Villa =

Italian motorcycle racer

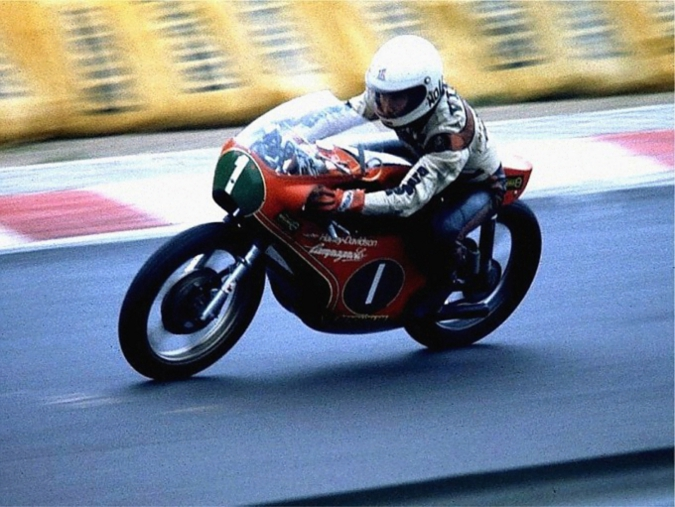
- Walter Villa in 1976 at the Nürburgring
- Nationality: Italian
Motorcycle racing career statistics
Grand Prix motorcycle racing
Active years	1967 - 1980
First race	1967 125cc West German Grand Prix
Last race	1980 250cc Czechoslovak Grand Prix
First win	1974 250cc Nations Grand Prix
Last win	1979 250cc Venezuelan Grand Prix
Team	Harley-Davidson
Championships	250cc-1974, 1975, 1976 350cc- 1976
Starts / Wins / Podiums / Poles / F. laps / Points; 72 / 24 / 36 / 14 / 20

Walter Villa (13 August 1943 – 18 June 2002) was an Italian professional motorcycle road racer. He competed in the FIM Grand Prix motorcycle racing world championships from 1967 to 1980, most prominently as a member of the Harley-Davidson/Aermacchi factory racing team where he won four World Championships. He was known for his quiet, unassuming nature off the bike who became a ruthless competitor once the races began.

== Motorcycle racing career ==
Villa was born in Castelnuovo Rangone in the Emilia-Romagna region of Italy, between Maranello and Modena, the heart of Italian motor sport country. Villa began racing at 13, on a 175cc Moto Morini. In his first race, he finished third, beating Giacomo Agostini, who went on to become Italy's greatest-ever bike racer.

In the early 1970s, Harley-Davidson bought the ailing Aermacchi factory near Milan, with the aim of selling a range of bikes from 125cc machines to complement the traditional big V-twins built in the United States. First, they marketed Aermacchi's horizontal single cylinder four-strokes, and then began to develop their own two-strokes.

The Aermacchi / Harley-Davidson factory hired Walter Villa for their racing effort in the Grand Prix motorcycle racing circuit after the death of Renzo Pasolini at Monza in May 1973. During the winter of 1973 -1974, the factory under the direction of Dr. Sandro Colombo, made huge progress in developing their machines in order to compete with Yamaha. This progress allowed Villa to take victory in the 1974 championship, with Villa winning the first 250 cc championship race of the year - in Italy by 45 seconds.

Villa went on to win the 1975 and 1976 250cc world championship together with the 350cc title in 1976. In addition to the four World titles, he won eight Italian Championships. After he retired at the end of the 1980 season, Villa became a key player in the grand prix historic motorsport circuit, riding in high speed demonstrations in addition to becoming his country's top trainer.

Villa died of a heart attack, aged 58, on 18 June 2002.

== Grand Prix motorcycle racing results ==
Points system from 1950 to 1968:

**Position**	1	2	3	4	5	6
**Points**	8	6	4	3	2	1

Points system from 1969 onwards:

**Position**	1	2	3	4	5	6	7	8	9	10
**Points**	15	12	10	8	6	5	4	3	2	1

(key) (Races in bold indicate pole position; races in italics indicate fastest lap)

Year	Class	Team	1	2	3	4	5	6	7	8	9	10	11	12	13	Points	Rank	Wins
1967	125cc	Montesa	ESP -	GER; 4	FRA -	IOM -	NED -	BEL -	DDR -	CZE -	FIN -	ULS -	NAT -	CAN -	JPN -	3	15th	0
1969	125cc	Montesa	ESP; 3													18	11th	0
1969	125cc	Villa		GER -	FRA -	IOM -	NED -	BEL -	DDR -	CZE -	FIN -		NAT; 4	YUG -		18	11th	0
1969	250cc	Villa	ESP -	GER -	FRA -	IOM -	NED -	BEL -	DDR -	CZE -	FIN -	ULS -	NAT; NC	YUG; NC		0	-	0
1970	125cc	Villa	GER -	FRA; 18	YUG -	IOM -	NED -	BEL; 10	DDR -	CZE -	FIN -	NAT; 6	ESP -			6	29th	0
1972	350cc	Yamaha	GER -	FRA -	AUT -	NAT; 7	IOM -	YUG -	NED -		DDR -	CZE -	SWE -	FIN -	ESP -	4	28th	0
1973	250cc	Yamaha	FRA; 10	AUT; 7	GER; 8		IOM -	YUG -	NED -	BEL -	CZE -	SWE -	FIN -	ESP -		8	26th	0
1973	350cc	Kawasaki	FRA; 6													23	11th	0
1973	350cc	Yamaha		AUT; 2	GER -											23	11th	0
1973	350cc	Benelli				NAT; 5	IOM -	YUG -	NED -		CZE -	SWE -	FIN -	ESP -		23	11th	0
1974	250cc	Harley-Davidson		GER -		**NAT**; 1	IOM -	NED; 1	BEL; 6	SWE; 2	FIN; 1	CZE; 1	YUG -	ESP -		77	1st	4
1974	350cc	Harley-Davidson	FRA -	GER -	AUT; 6	NAT; 4	IOM -	NED; 9	BEL -	SWE -	FIN -	CZE -				15	16th	0
1975	250cc	Harley-Davidson	FRA -	**ESP**; 1		**GER**; 1	**NAT**; 1	IOM -	**NED**; 1	**BEL**; 3	SWE; 1	FIN -	CZE -	YUG -		85	1st	5
1975	350cc	Harley-Davidson	FRA -	ESP; 8	AUT -	GER -	NAT -	IOM -	NED -			FIN -	CZE -	YUG -		3	36th	0
1976	250cc	Harley-Davidson	**FRA**; 1		**NAT**; 1	IOM -	**NED**; 1	**BEL**; 1	SWE -	**FIN**; 1	**CSK**; 1	**GER**; 1	ESP; 2			90	1st	7
1976	350cc	Harley-Davidson	FRA; 1	AUT; 2	NAT; 7	IOM -	NED -			FIN; 1	CSK; 1	GER; 1	ESP; 6			76	1st	4
1977	250cc	Harley-Davidson	VEN; 1	GER -	NAT -	ESP -	FRA -	YUG -	NED; 4	**BEL**; 1	SWE -	FIN; 1	CSK; 2	GBR; 9		67	3rd	3
1977	350cc	Harley-Davidson	VEN -	GER; 7	NAT; 7	ESP -	FRA -	YUG -	NED; 8		SWE -	FIN; 8	CSK -	GBR -		14	18th	0
1978	250cc	Harley-Davidson	VEN -	ESP -	FRA -	NAT -	NED -	BEL; 3	SWE -	FIN -	GBR -	GER -	CSK; 8	YUG -		13	16th	0
1979	250cc	Yamaha	VEN; 1		GER -	NAT; 4	ESP; 5	YUG -	NED; 9	BEL -	SWE -	FIN; 5	GBR -	CZE; 9	FRA -	39	7th	1
1979	350cc	Yamaha	VEN; 2	AUT; 5	GER -	NAT -	ESP -	YUG -	NED; 3			FIN -	GBR -	CZE -	FRA; 3	38	7th	0
1980	250cc	Yamaha	NAT -	ESP -	FRA -	YUG; 9	NED -	BEL -	FIN -	GBR -	CZE; 9	GER -				4	29th	0
1980	350cc	Yamaha	NAT; 3		FRA; 6		NED -			GBR; 10	CZE -	GER -				16	9th	0
