= Jack Middelburg =

Dutch motorcycle racer

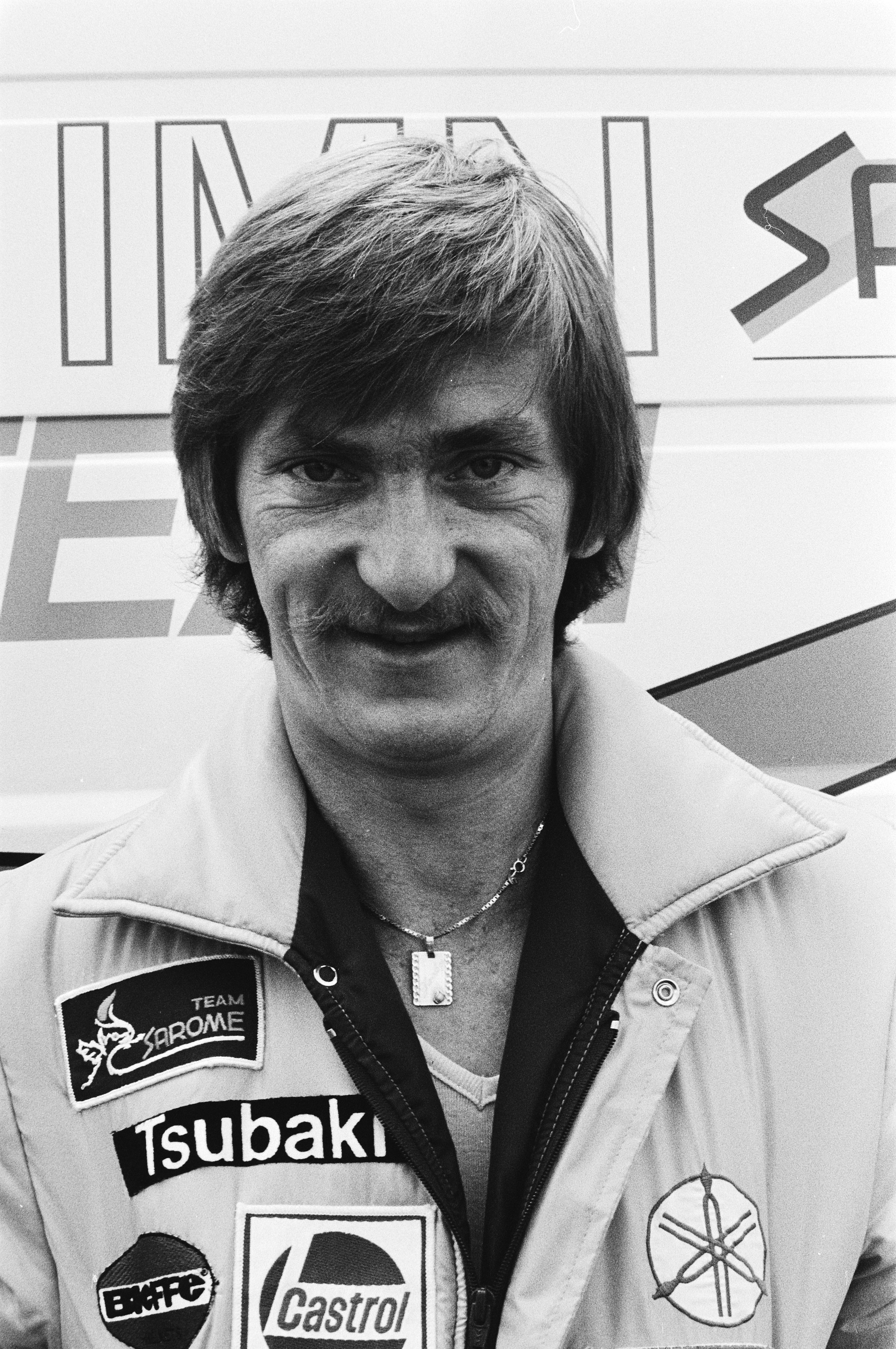
- Middelburg at the 1980 Dutch TT
- Nationality: Dutch
- Born: 30 April 1952; Naaldwijk, Netherlands
- Died: 3 April 1984 (aged 31); Groningen, Netherlands
Motorcycle racing career statistics
Grand Prix motorcycle racing
Active years	1977 - 1983
First race	1977 350 cc Dutch TT
Last race	1983 500 cc San Marino Grand Prix
First win	1980 500 cc Dutch TT
Last win	1981 500 cc British Grand Prix
Team	Yamaha
Championships	0
Starts / Wins / Podiums / Poles / F. laps / Points; 37 / 2 / 4 / 2 / 1 / 141

Jack Middelburg (30 April 1952 – 3 April 1984) was a Dutch professional Grand Prix motorcycle road racer. Together with Wil Hartog and Boet van Dulmen, he was part of a contingent of Dutch riders who competed at the highest levels of Grand Prix racing in the late 1970s. Middelburg never earned a factory-sponsored race bike, yet managed to post some impressive results.

== Motorcycling career ==
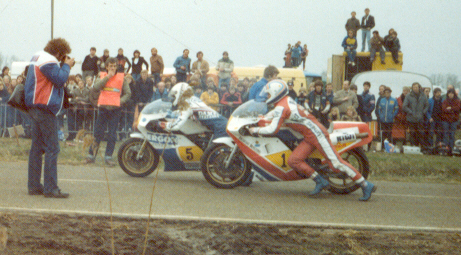
Jack Middelburg (Left) with Boet van Dulmen on the starting line at a race in Heeswijk in 1982

Middelburg became the second Dutchman to win the Dutch TT in 1980, and in 1981 he pulled off an unexpected upset when he defeated the defending world champion, Kenny Roberts, at the British Grand Prix at Silverstone. His British Grand Prix victory aboard a Suzuki RG500 was the last time a privateer competitor won a 500cc Grand Prix race, as motorcycle Grand Prix racing became increasingly professional during the 1980s. His best years were in 1979 and 1981, when he finished in seventh place in the 500cc world championships.

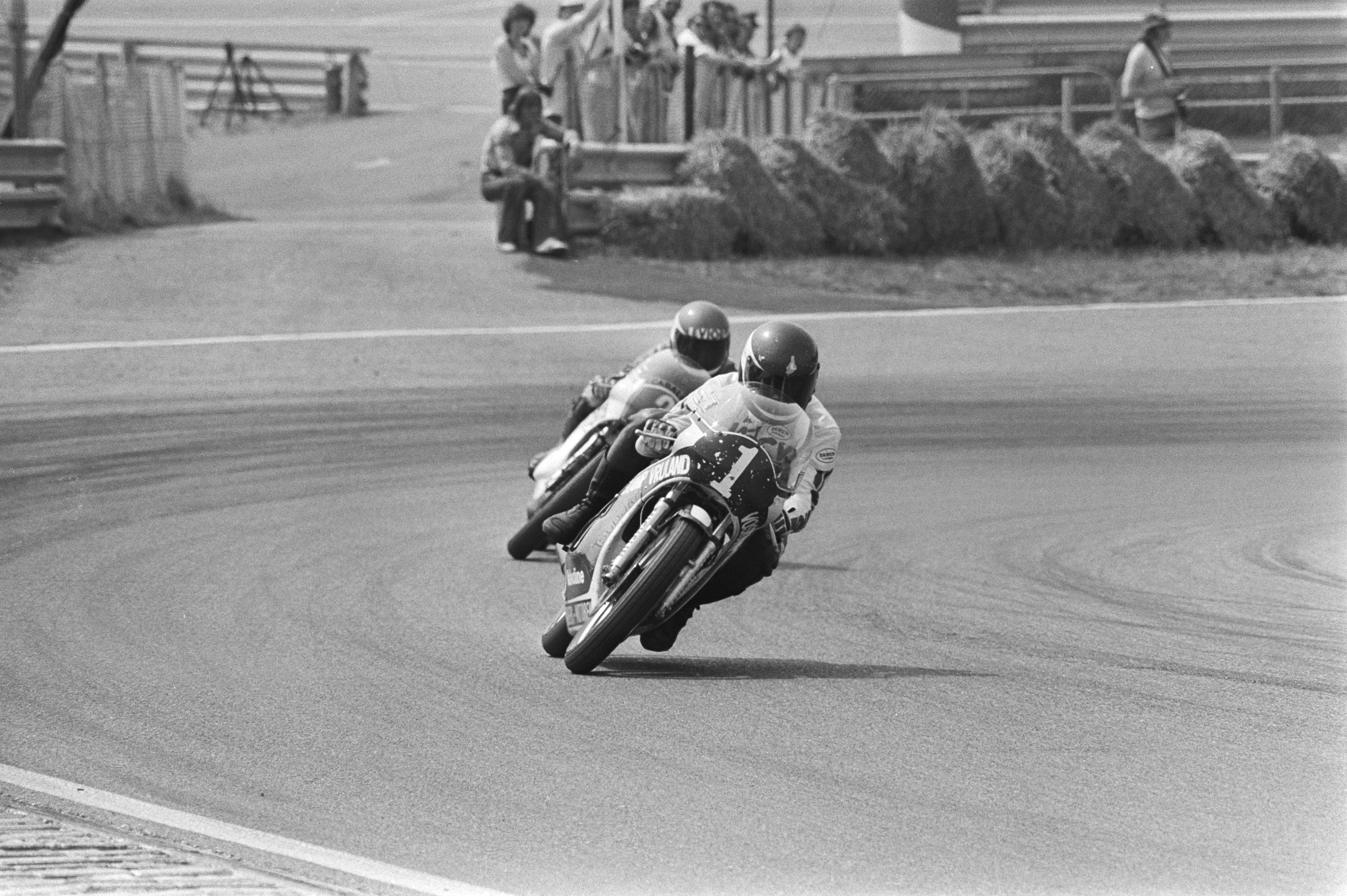
Middelburg (1) competing in a 350cc Dutch National Championship race at the Zandvoort Circuit in 1978

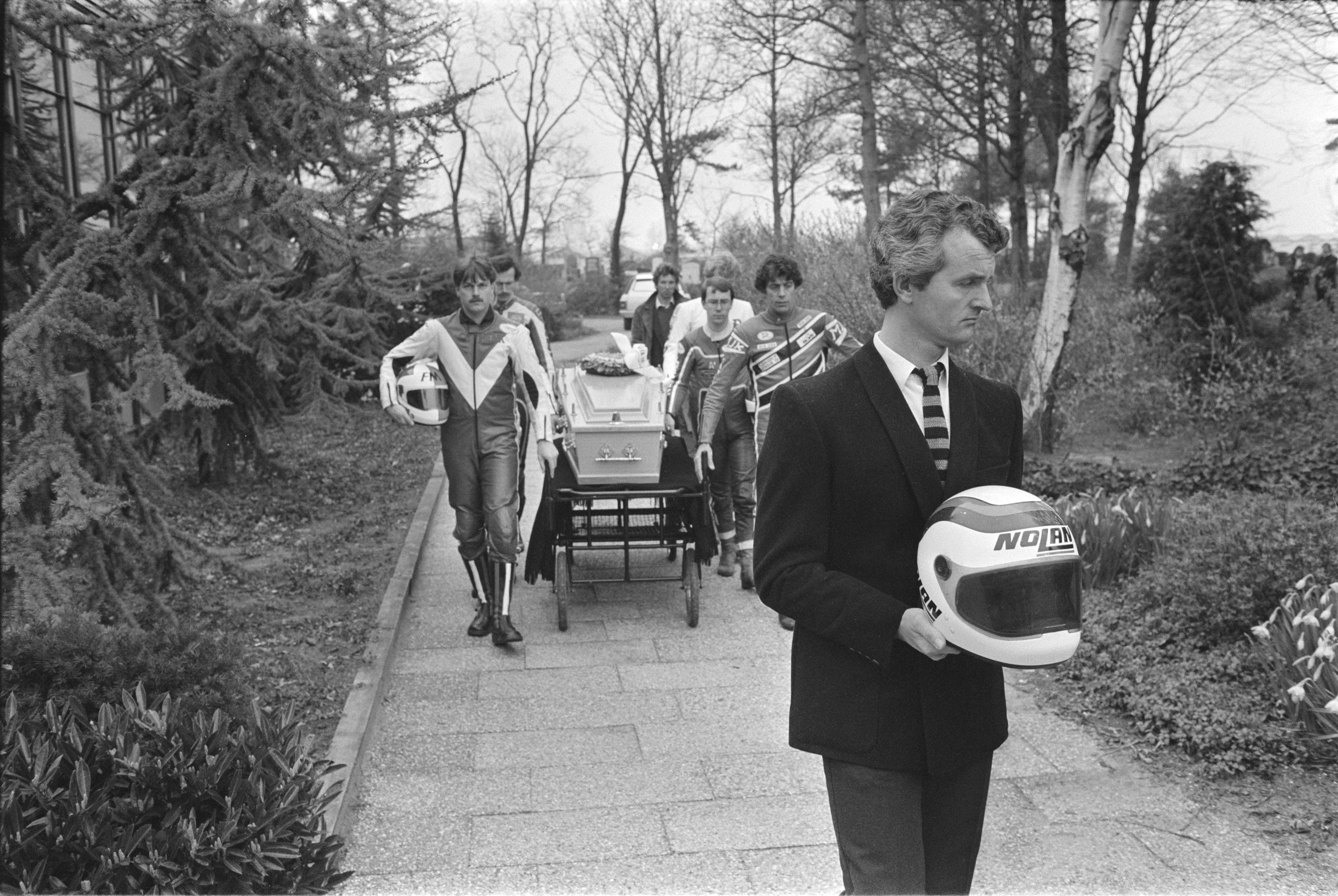
Wil Hartog (Carrying Middelburg's helmet), leads pall bearers during Middelburg's funeral.

Middelburg was killed while competing in a street circuit race in Tolbert, Netherlands in 1984. On 2 April, he lost control of his motorcycle, and was run over by Boet van Dulmen. He was rushed to hospital, and died a day later.

== Career statistics ==
=== Grand Prix motorcycle racing ===
==== Races by year ====
(key) (Races in bold indicate pole position) (Races in italics indicate fastest lap)

Year	Class	Bike	1	2	3	4	5	6	7	8	9	10	11	12	13	Pos.	Pts
1977	350cc	Yamaha	VEN		GER	NAT	SPA	FRA	YUG	NED; 11		SWE	FIN	CZE	GBR	NC	0
1977	500cc	Suzuki	VEN	AUT	GER	NAT		FRA		NED; 11	BEL	SWE	FIN	CZE	GBR	NC	0
1978	350cc	Yamaha	VEN		AUT; DNQ	FRA	NAT	NED; 13		SWE; Ret	FIN	GBR; 16	GER	CZE	YUG	NC	0
1978	500cc	Suzuki	VEN	SPA	AUT; Ret	FRA	NAT	NED; 15	BEL	SWE; 13	FIN	GBR; 14	GER; 11			NC	0
1979	500cc	Suzuki	VEN	AUT; 15	GER; 7	NAT; 7	SPA; 7	YUG; Ret	NED; 7	BEL; DNS	SWE; 2	FIN; 4	GBR; DNS	FRA		7th	36
1980	500cc	Yamaha	NAT; DNS	SPA; 15	FRA; Ret	**NED**; 1	BEL; Ret	FIN; Ret	GBR; 9	GER; 8						9th	20
1981	500cc	Suzuki	AUT; 8	GER; 8	NAT; 7	FRA; 9	YUG; DNS	NED; 5	BEL; 6	RSM; 7	GBR; 1	FIN; 4	SWE; 3			7th	60
1982	500cc	Suzuki	ARG; 9	AUT; Ret	FRA; DNS	SPA; Ret	NAT	NED; Ret	**BEL**; Ret	YUG; 6	GBR	SWE	RSM; 5	GER; Ret		16th	13
1983	500cc	Honda	RSA	FRA; 10	NAT; Ret	GER; 11	SPA; 8	AUT; 8	YUG; 11	NED; 6	BEL; Ret	GBR; Ret	SWE; DNS	RSM; Ret		12th	12
