= Michel Rougerie =

French motorcycle racer

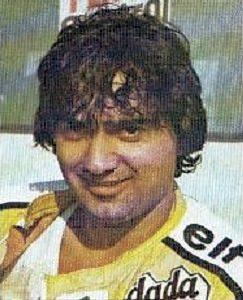
- Michel Rougerie (1978)
- Nationality: French
Motorcycle racing career statistics
Grand Prix motorcycle racing
Active years	1972 - 1981
First race	1972 125cc French Grand Prix
Last race	1981 350cc Nations Grand Prix
First win	1975 250cc Finnish Grand Prix
Last win	1977 350cc Spanish Grand Prix
Team	Harley-Davidson
Starts / Wins / Podiums / Poles / F. laps / Points; 65 / 3 / 17 / 6 / 2 / 393

Michel Rougerie (21 April 1950 in Montreuil-sous-Bois – 31 May 1981 in Rijeka) was a French professional motorcycle racer. He competed in the Grand Prix road racing world championships from 1972 to 1981.

Rougerie's best year was in 1975 when he won two races and finished in second place in the 250cc world championship behind his Harley-Davidson team-mate Walter Villa. Rougerie actually scored more points than Villa that season, but because only the best six results of the season were counted, he lost the championship.

At the 1980 British Grand Prix at Silverstone, Rougerie was involved in a collision which claimed the life of fellow French racer Patrick Pons. He was killed under similar circumstances just nine months later, at the 1981 Yugoslavian Grand Prix, where he was struck by his teammate Roger Sibille having just recovered from a crash.

== Grand Prix motorcycle racing results ==
Points system from 1969 onwards:

**Position**	1	2	3	4	5	6	7	8	9	10
**Points**	15	12	10	8	6	5	4	3	2	1

(key) (Races in bold indicate pole position; races in italics indicate fastest lap)

Year	Class	Team	1	2	3	4	5	6	7	8	9	10	11	12	13	Points	Rank	Wins
1972	125cc	Aermacchi	GER -	FRA; 9	AUT -	NAT -	IOM -	YUG -	NED -	BEL -	DDR -	CZE -	SWE -	FIN -	ESP -	2	38th	0
1972	350cc	Aermacchi	GER -	FRA; 9	AUT -	NAT -	IOM -	YUG -	NED -	BEL -	DDR -	CZE -	SWE -	FIN -	ESP -	3	30th	0
1973	250cc	Harley-Davidson	FRA; 4	AUT -	GER -		IOM -	YUG -	NED; 2	BEL; 4	CZE; 2	SWE -	FIN -	ESP; 6		45	5th	0
1973	350cc	Harley-Davidson	FRA -	AUT -	GER -	NAT -	IOM -	YUG -	NED -		CZE; 7	SWE -	FIN -	ESP -		4	34th	0
1973	500cc	Harley-Davidson	FRA -	AUT -	GER -		IOM -	YUG -	NED -	BEL; 5	CZE -	SWE -	FIN -	ESP -		6	28th	0
1974	250cc	Harley-Davidson		GER -		NAT -	IOM -	NED -	BEL; 5	SWE; 8	FIN; 2	CZE -	YUG -	ESP -		21	9th	0
1974	350cc	Harley-Davidson	FRA; 5	GER -	AUT; 5	NAT; 3	IOM -	NED -		SWE -	FIN; 8		YUG -	ESP -		25	7th	0
1974	500cc	Harley-Davidson	FRA; 5	GER -	AUT -	NAT -	IOM -	NED -	BEL; 6	SWE -	FIN -	CZE; 8				14	16th	0
1975	250cc	Harley-Davidson	FRA; 3	ESP; 6		GER; 2	NAT; 3	IOM -	NED; 2	BEL; 2	SWE -	FIN; 1	CZE; 1	YUG -		76	2nd	2
1975	500cc	Harley-Davidson	FRA; 7		AUT -	GER -	NAT -	IOM -	NED -	BEL -	SWE -	FIN -	CZE -			4	28th	0
1976	500cc	Suzuki	FRA; Ret	AUT; 4	NAT -	IOM -	NED -	BEL; 4	SWE -	FIN -	CZE -	GER -				16	14th	0
1977	250cc	Yamaha	VEN -		GER -	NAT -	ESP; 6	FRA -	YUG -	NED -	BEL -	SWE -	FIN -	CZE -	GBR -	5	27th	0
1977	350cc	Yamaha	VEN -		GER; 9	NAT; 4	ESP; 1	FRA -	YUG; 3	NED; 2		SWE -	FIN -	CZE; 8	GBR -	50	4th	1
1977	500cc	Suzuki	VEN -	AUT; DNS	GER; Ret	NAT; DNS		FRA; Ret		NED; 8	BEL; 23	SWE; 11	FIN; 4	CZE; 3	GBR -	21	13th	0
1978	350cc	Yamaha	VEN -		AUT; 6	FRA; 10	NAT; 4	NED -		SWE; 10	FIN; 7	GBR; 4	GER; 3	CZE; 3	YUG -	47	6th	0
1978	500cc	Suzuki	VEN -	ESP -	AUT; 6	FRA -	NAT -	NED; 6	BEL; 4	SWE -	FIN; NC	GBR; 11	GER; 6			23	10th	0
1979	350cc	Yamaha	VEN -	AUT -	GER -	NAT -	ESP -	YUG -	NED -			FIN -	GBR; 6	CZE -	FRA; 6	10	17th	0
1979	500cc	Suzuki	VEN; 5	AUT -	GER -	NAT -	ESP; 9	YUG; 6	NED -	BEL; DNS	SWE -	FIN -	GBR -		FRA; 8	16	15th	0
1980	500cc	Suzuki	NAT -	ESP; 11	FRA; 7	NED; 14	BEL -	FIN; 15	GBR -	GER -						4	17th	0
1981	350cc	Yamaha	ARG -	AUT -	GER -	NAT; 10	YUG -	NED -	GBR -	CZE -						1	32nd	0
