= Wil Hartog =

Dutch motorcycle racer

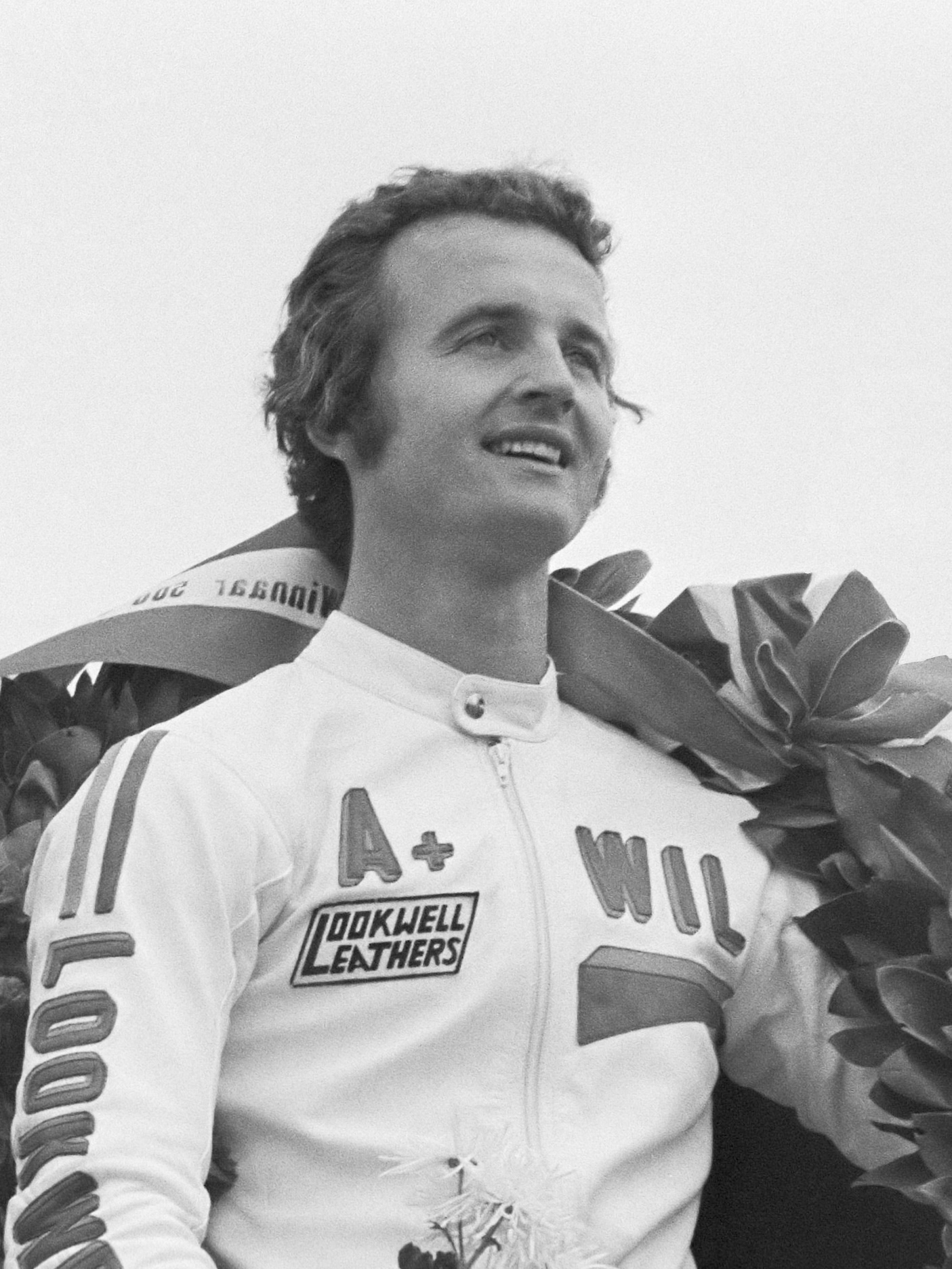
- Wil Hartog
- Nationality: Dutch
- Born: May 28, 1948 (age 78); Abbekerk, Netherlands
Motorcycle racing career statistics
Grand Prix motorcycle racing
| Active years | 1972–1981 |
| First race | 1972 250cc Dutch TT |
| Last race | 1981 500cc West German Grand Prix |
| First win | 1977 500cc Dutch TT |
| Last win | 1980 500cc Finnish Grand Prix |
| Team | Suzuki |
| Championships | 0 |
Starts / Wins / Podiums / Poles / F. laps / Points; 45 / 5 / 12 / 0 / 2 / 217

Wil Hartog (born 28 May 1948) is a Dutch former professional Grand Prix motorcycle road racer. He competed in the Grand Prix motorcycle racing world championships from 1972 to 1981. Hartog was the first Dutch competitor to win a 500cc Grand Prix race.

== Motorcycle racing career ==
Born in Abbekerk, North Holland, Hartog became the first Dutchman to win a 500cc Grand Prix when he claimed a victory at the 1977 Dutch TT. When Suzuki factory team rider Pat Hennen suffered career-ending injuries while competing in the 1978 Isle of Man TT, Hartog was hired as his replacement to help their number one rider, Barry Sheene, defend his world championship. However, Sheene was unhappy when his Hartog won the 1978 Belgian Grand Prix ahead of Kenny Roberts and Sheene in second and third places. He challenged Roberts and Sheene during the 1979 season however, he crashed while leading four Grand Prix races and ended the season ranked fourth in the 500cc World Championship.

Hartog won five Grands Prix during his career. Standing over 1,80 meters tall, he was at a disadvantage against his jockey-sized competitors yet he still managed impressive results. With his penchant for wearing all white riding apparel, he was nicknamed The White Giant.

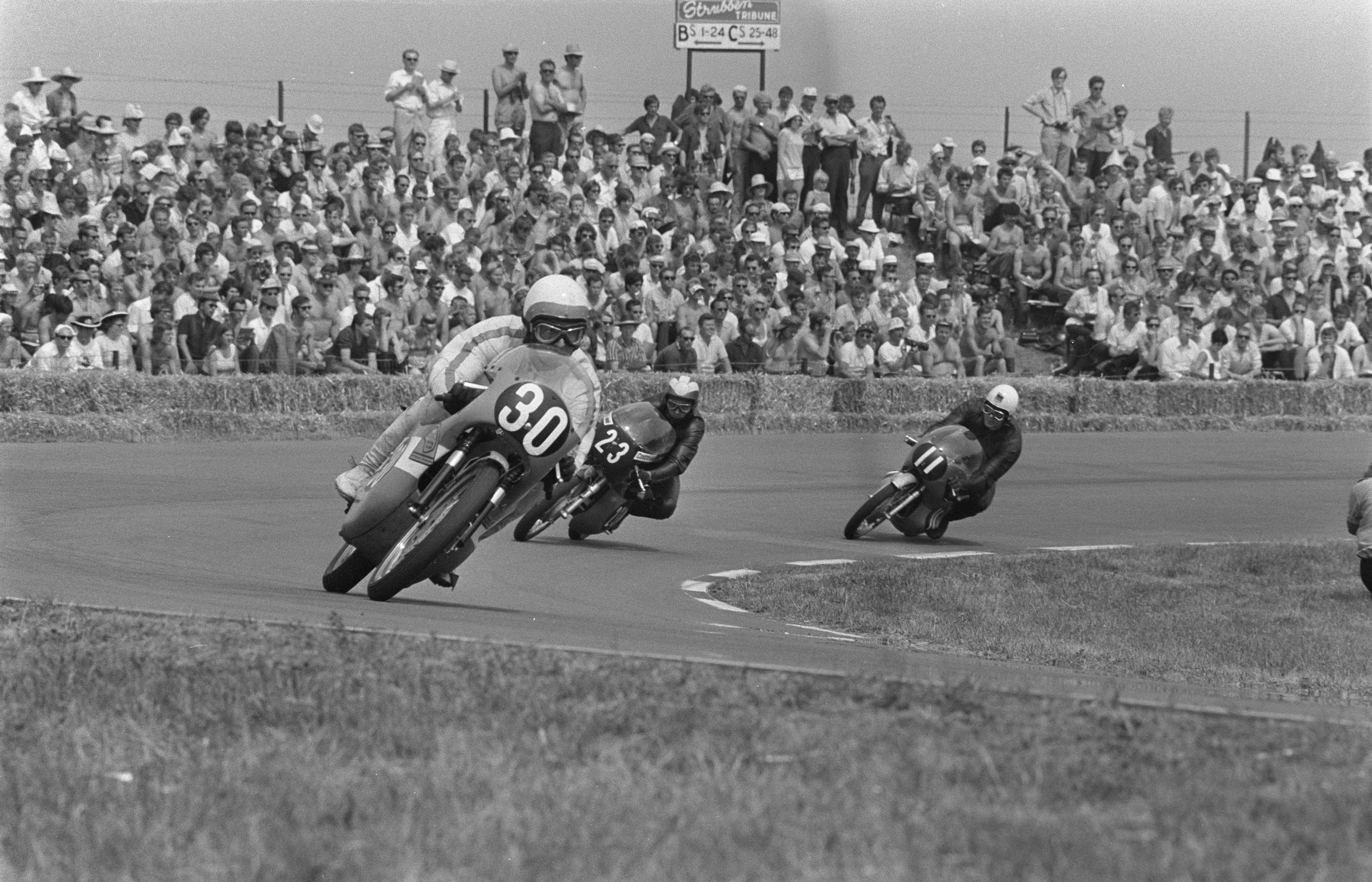
Hartog (30) competing in his first World Championship race, leads Walter Szabo (23) and Dieter Braun (11) during the 1970 125cc Dutch TT.

To commemorate the fortieth anniversary of his 1977 Dutch TT victory, Hartog was honored during the 2017 Dutch TT by riding a lap of the Assen TT circuit on the motorcycle he won on, accompanied by Freddie Sheene, the son of Hartog's late teammate, on one of his father's motorcycles.

Hartog's nephew, Rob, is a motorcycle racer who has taken part in the Supersport World Championship and the FIM Endurance World Championship.

== Career statistics ==
=== Grand Prix motorcycle racing ===
==== Races by year ====
(key) (Races in bold indicate pole position) (Races in italics indicate fastest lap)

| Year | Class | Bike | 1 | 2 | 3 | 4 | 5 | 6 | 7 | 8 | 9 | 10 | 11 | 12 | 13 | Pos. | Pts |
|---|---|---|---|---|---|---|---|---|---|---|---|---|---|---|---|---|---|
| 1970 | 125cc | Yamaha | GER | FRA | YUG | IOM | NED; Ret | BEL | DDR | CZE | FIN | NAT | SPA | | | NC | 0 |
| 1972 | 250cc | Yamaha | GER | FRA | AUT | NAT | IOM | YUG | NED; 14 | BEL | DDR | CZE | SWE | FIN | SPA | NC | 0 |
| 1972 | 500cc | Riemanoc | GER; Ret | FRA | AUT | NAT | IOM | YUG | | | | | | | | NC | 0 |
| 1972 | 500cc | Yamaha | | | | | | | NED; Ret | BEL | DDR | CZE | SWE | FIN | SPA | NC | 0 |
| 1973 | 350cc | Yamaha | FRA | AUT | GER | NAT | IOM | YUG | NED; Ret | | CZE | SWE | FIN | SPA | | NC | 0 |
| 1973 | 500cc | Yamaha | FRA | AUT | GER | | IOM | YUG | NED; 4 | BEL | CZE | SWE | FIN | SPA | | 25th | 8 |
| 1974 | 250cc | Yamaha | | GER | | NAT | IOM | NED; 15 | BEL | SWE | FIN | CZE | YUG | SPA | | NC | 0 |
| 1974 | 350cc | Yamaha | FRA | GER | AUT | NAT | IOM | NED; 15 | | SWE | FIN | | YUG | SPA | | NC | 0 |
| 1975 | 350cc | Yamaha | FRA | SPA | AUT | GER | NAT | IOM | NED; 6 | | | FIN | CZE | YUG | | 26th | 5 |
| 1975 | 500cc | Suzuki | FRA | | AUT | GER | NAT | IOM | NED; Ret | BEL | SWE | FIN | CZE | | | NC | 0 |
| 1976 | 500cc | Suzuki | FRA | AUT; Ret | NAT | IOM | NED; 3 | BEL | SWE; Ret | FIN | CZE | GER | | | | 21st | 10 |
| 1977 | 500cc | Suzuki | VEN | AUT; DNS | GER; 6 | NAT; Ret | FRA; Ret | NED; 1 | BEL; 7 | SWE; 5 | FIN; Ret | CZE; Ret | GBR; Ret | | | 10th | 30 |
| 1978 | 500cc | Suzuki | VEN | SPA; 9 | AUT; 7 | FRA; 5 | NAT; 6 | NED; 5 | BEL; 1 | SWE; 2 | FIN; 1 | GBR; Ret | GER; Ret | | | 4th | 65 |
| 1979 | 500cc | Suzuki | VEN; Ret | AUT; 3 | GER; 1 | NAT; Ret | SPA; 2 | YUG; 4 | NED; 3 | BEL; DNS | SWE; Ret | FIN; 10 | GBR; 3 | FRA; 18 | | 4th | 66 |
| 1980 | 500cc | Suzuki | NAT; Ret | SPA; Ret | FRA | NED; 19 | BEL; 5 | FIN; 1 | GBR; Ret | GER; 3 | | | | | | 6th | 31 |
| 1981 | 500cc | Suzuki | AUT; 9 | GER; 14 | NAT | FRA | YUG | NED | BEL | RSM | GBR | FIN | SWE | | | 23rd | 2 |
