= Pier Paolo Bianchi =

Italian motorcycle racer (born 1952)

- Nationality: Italian
Motorcycle racing career statistics
Grand Prix motorcycle racing
Active years	1973 - 1989
First race	1973 125 cc Nations Grand Prix
Last race	1989 125cc West German Grand Prix
First win	1976 125 cc Austrian Grand Prix
Last win	1986 125cc San Marino Grand Prix
Team	Morbidelli
Championships	125 cc - 1976, 1977, 1980
Starts / Wins / Podiums / Poles / F. laps / Points; 127 / 27 / 61 / 32 / 24 / 999

Pier Paolo Bianchi (born 11 March 1952) is an Italian former professional motorcycle road racer. He competed in the FIM Grand Prix motorcycle racing world championships from 1973 to 1989.

Bianchi won consecutive FIM 125 cc world championships in 1976 and 1977. He won one more 125 championship in 1980 on an MBA.

== Complete Grand Prix motorcycle racing results ==
Points system from 1969 to 1987:

**Position**	1	2	3	4	5	6	7	8	9	10
**Points**	15	12	10	8	6	5	4	3	2	1

Points system from 1988 to 1992:

**Position**	1	2	3	4	5	6	7	8	9	10	11	12	13	14	15
**Points**	20	17	15	13	11	10	9	8	7	6	5	4	3	2	1

(key) (Races in bold indicate pole position; races in italics indicate fastest lap)

Year	Class	Bike	1	2	3	4	5	6	7	8	9	10	11	12	13	Points	Rank	Wins
1973	125cc	Yamaha	FRA -	AUT -	GER -	NAT; 5	IOM -	YUG -	NED -	BEL -	CZE -	SWE -	FIN -	ESP -		6	22nd	0
1974	125cc	Minarelli	FRA -	GER -	AUT -	NAT; 3	NED -	BEL -	SWE -	CZE -	YUG -	ESP -				10	17th	0
1975	125cc	Morbidelli	FRA -	ESP; 4	**AUT**; 2	**GER**; 2	**NAT**; 2	NED; 2	BEL; 2	SWE; 2	CZE -	YUG -				72	**2nd**	0
1976	125cc	Morbidelli	**AUT**; 1	**NAT**; 1	YUG; 1	**NED**; 1	BEL -	**SWE**; 1	**FIN**; 1	GER -	ESP; 1					90	**1st**	7
1977	125cc	Morbidelli	VEN -	AUT; 2	GER; 1	**NAT**; 1	**ESP**; 1	**FRA**; 1	**YUG**; 1	**NED**; 9	**BEL**; 1	**SWE**; 2	**FIN**; 1	GBR -		131	**1st**	7
1978	125cc	Minarelli	**VEN**; 1	ESP -	AUT; 3	FRA; 1	NAT -	NED -	BEL; 1	**SWE**; 1	FIN -	GBR -	GER -	YUG -		70	**3rd**	4
1979	125cc	Minarelli	VEN -	AUT -	GER -	NAT -	ESP -	YUG; 7	NED -	BEL -	SWE; 1	FIN -	GBR; 5	CZE -	FRA; 3	35	10th	1
1980	125cc	MBA	**NAT**; 1	**ESP**; 1	FRA; 2	YUG -	NED; 4	BEL; 4	FIN; 2	GBR; 3	CZE; 5	GER; 7				90	**1st**	2
1981	125cc	MBA	ARG; 5	**AUT**; 3	GER -	NAT -	FRA; 3	ESP; 3	**YUG**; 2	NED; 3	RSM; 3	GBR; 4	FIN -	**SWE**; 4	CZE -	84	**3rd**	0
1982	125cc	Sanvenero	ARG; 6	AUT; 3	FRA -	ESP -	**NAT**; 2	NED -	BEL; 3	YUG; 2	GBR; 3	SWE -	FIN -	CZE -		59	4th	0
1983	125cc	Sanvenero	FRA -	NAT; NC	GER; 3	ESP; 3	AUT; 3	YUG; NC	NED; NC	**BEL**; NC	GBR; 13	SWE; 7	RSM; 5			40	8th	0
1984	80cc	Rieju	NAT; 1	ESP; 1	AUT; 4	GER; 2		YUG; NC	NED; 6	BEL; 4			RSM; 6			68	**3rd**	2
1984	125cc	MBA	NAT; NC	ESP -		GER -	FRA -		NED -		GBR -	SWE -	RSM -			0	-	0
1985	125cc	MBA	ESP; 1	**GER**; 3	NAT; 1	AUT; 4	NED; 1	BEL; 5	FRA; 5	GBR; 2	SWE; 2	RSM; NC				99	**2nd**	3
1986	80cc	Seel	ESP; 4	NAT; 5	GER; NC	AUT; 3	YUG; 6	NED; NC			GBR -		RSM; 1	BWU -		44	8th	1
1986	125cc	Seel	ESP; 7	NAT; 5	GER; 11	AUT; 4		NED; NC	BEL; 7	FRA; 7	GBR; 10	SWE; 9	RSM; 6	BWU -		34	8th	0
1987	125cc	MBA	ESP; 5	GER; 4	NAT; 5	AUT; NC	NED; 5	FRA; NC	GBR; 2	SWE; 6	CZE; NC	RSM; NC	POR; NC			43	7th	0
1988	125cc	Cagiva	ESP -	NAT; 4	GER; NC	AUT; NC	NED; 9	BEL; 12	YUG; NC	FRA; NC	GBR; NC	SWE; NC	CZE; 25			24	19th	0
1989	125cc	Seel	JPN -	AUS -	ESP -	NAT -	GER; NC	AUT -	NED -	BEL -	FRA -	GBR -	SWE -	CZE -		0	-	0
