= Tom Herron =

Irish motorcycle racer

- Nationality: Irish
Motorcycle racing career statistics
Grand Prix motorcycle racing
Active years	1970 – 1979
First race	1970 Isle of Man Junior TT
Last race	1979 500cc Spanish Grand Prix
First win	1976 Isle of Man Lightweight TT
Last win	1976 Isle of Man Senior TT
Starts / Wins / Podiums / Poles / F. laps / Points; 73 / 2 / 14 / 3 / 1 / 373

Tom Herron (14 December 1948 – 26 May 1979) was a Grand Prix motorcycle road racer from Lisburn, County Antrim in Northern Ireland. He specialised in street circuits such as the Isle of Man TT and the North West 200.

== Early life ==
Herron was born on 14 December 1948 in Lisburn, County Antrim to parents Francis Scott and Elizabeth Herron. Herron grew up in Leitrim, County Down, a small village nearby to Castlewellan.

From a young age, Herron expressed an interest in motorcycling, originally partaking in basic grasstracking around Leitrim, however, with the influence of his uncles James and Wilfie, he soon developed an interest in road racing and short-circuit racing.

After purchasing one of his first motorcycles from his uncles in 1968 and modifying it for racing, Herron entered his first road race at the age of 19 when he took part in the 1968 Tandragee 100 on a 250cc Greeves.

== Career ==
=== The beginning ===
Herron's career started in 1965 when he competed in numerous events throughout Ireland, building up his experience along the way. In 1970, he won his first major race, the 350 class at the North West 200.

=== The 1970s ===
After winning the 1973 Irish 350cc championship, he moved up to the Grand Prix world championships. During these years, Herron competed as a privateer, against the factory backed riders, and it was a David vs Goliath struggle to compete. During this time, he met and eventually married Andrea, a sister of sometime Norton rider Peter Williams. They eventually had two girls, twins named Kim and Zoë.

At the close of 1976, he finished fourth in both the 250cc and 350cc world championships. Herron won the last Senior TT at the Isle of Man TT before the FIM stripped the event of its world championship status in 1976. The following year, he finished runner-up in the 350cc world championship to Yamaha factory rider Takazumi Katayama.

In 1978, Herron strengthened his position as one of the world's best riders on privateer machinery with fifth and sixth places in the 250cc and 350cc world championships respectively.

For the 1979 season, he finally got his big break, as a full works, manufacturer backed rider for the Texaco Heron Suzuki team in the 500cc world championship, alongside two-time world 500cc world champion Barry Sheene, and future Truck racer Steve Parrish.

The season started well, with a third in Venezuela and Italy, and a fourth in Austria. This left him in third place in the championship after three rounds. At the fourth round in Spain he crashed in practice and broke his right thumb, suffered third degree burns and was unable to race. He finished the season in tenth place.

== Death ==
After the fourth round of the 500cc world championship, Herron returned home to compete in the North West 200, where, in the previous year, he won two races, and he set a lap record of 127.63 mph. The course record still stands due to alterations made.

The 1979 North West 200 will always be remembered as "Black Saturday"; as it claimed the lives of Scotsman Brian Hamilton, Armoy man Frank Kennedy, who died of injuries months later, and Herron himself. In the last lap of the last race, Herron had been fighting for third place along with Jeff Sayle, Steve Parrish and Greg Johnstone, when he crashed at Juniper. He died later in Coleraine hospital, leaving behind his wife and two daughters.

Herron was buried at Leitrim presbyterian church, not far outside the village.

== Grand Prix motorcycle racing results ==
Points system from 1969 onwards:

**Position**	1	2	3	4	5	6	7	8	9	10
**Points**	15	12	10	8	6	5	4	3	2	1

(key) (Races in bold indicate pole position; races in italics indicate fastest lap)

Year	Class	Team	1	2	3	4	5	6	7	8	9	10	11	12	13	Points	Rank	Wins
1970	250cc	Yamaha	GER -	FRA -	YUG -	IOM; 13	NED -	BEL -	DDR -	CZE -	FIN -	ULS -	NAT -	ESP -		0	–	0
1970	350cc	Yamaha	GER -		YUG -	IOM; NC	NED -		DDR -	CZE -	FIN -	ULS -	NAT -	ESP -		0	–	0
1971	350cc	Yamaha	AUT -	GER -	IOM -	NED -		DDR -	CZE -	SWE -	FIN -	ULS; 9	NAT -	ESP -		2	49th	0
1971	500cc	Seeley	AUT -	GER -	IOM -	NED -	BEL -	DDR -		SWE -	FIN -	ULS; 7	NAT -	ESP -		4	34th	0
1972	250cc	Yamaha	GER -	FRA -	AUT -	NAT -	IOM; NC	YUG -	NED -	BEL -	DDR -	CZE -	SWE -	FIN -	ESP -	0	–	0
1972	350cc	Yamaha	GER -	FRA -	AUT -	NAT -	IOM; NC	YUG -	NED -		DDR -	CZE -	SWE -	FIN -	ESP -	0	–	0
1973	250cc	Yamaha	FRA -	AUT -	GER -		IOM; 9	YUG -	NED -	BEL -	CZE -	SWE -	FIN -	ESP -		2	39th	0
1973	350cc	Yamaha	FRA -	AUT -	GER -	NAT -	IOM; NC	YUG -	NED -		CZE -	SWE -	FIN -	ESP -		0	–	0
1974	250cc	Yamaha		GER -		NAT -	IOM; 4	NED; 6	BEL; 8	SWE -	FIN -	CZE -	YUG; 8	ESP -		14	14th	0
1974	350cc	Yamaha	FRA -	GER -	AUT -	NAT -	IOM; 4	NED -		SWE -	FIN -		YUG; 9	ESP -		10	22nd	0
1974	500cc	Yamaha	FRA -	GER -	AUT -	NAT -	IOM; 15	NED -	BEL -	SWE; 9	FIN -	CZE -				2	31st	0
1975	250cc	Yamaha	FRA; 9	ESP; 7		GER -	NAT; 7	IOM; NC	NED -	BEL -	SWE -	FIN; 10	CZE -	YUG; 6		16	13th	0
1975	350cc	Yamaha	FRA -	ESP -	AUT -	GER -	NAT -	IOM; 3	NED -			FIN -	CZE; 4	YUG; 4		26	9th	0
1975	500cc	Yamaha	FRA -		AUT; 8	GER -	NAT -	IOM; 21	NED -	BEL -	SWE -	FIN -	CZE -			3	34th	0
1976	250cc	Yamaha	FRA; 21		NAT; 7	YUG; 2	**IOM**; 1	NED; 7	BEL; 10	SWE; 6	FIN; 5	CZE; 6	GER; 14	ESP; 13		47	4th	1
1976	350cc	Yamaha	FRA; 9	AUT; 6	NAT; 5	YUG; 5	IOM; 26	NED; 7			FIN; 3	CZE; 3	GER -	ESP; 9		41	4th	0
1976	500cc	Yamaha	FRA -	AUT; 12	NAT -		IOM; 1	NED -	BEL; 12	SWE; 9	FIN -	CZE -	GER -			17	13th	1
1977	250cc	Yamaha	VEN; 6	GER; 7	NAT; 4	ESP; 7	FRA; 7	YUG; 3	NED; 10	BEL; 9	SWE; 7	FIN; 5	CZE; 5	GBR -		54	5th	0
1977	350cc	Yamaha	VEN; 5	GER; 6	NAT -	ESP -	FRA; 7	YUG; 4	NED; 4		SWE; 6	FIN; 4	CZE; 2	GBR -		56	2nd	0
1978	250cc	Yamaha	VEN -	ESP; 8		FRA; 5	NAT; 4	NED -	BEL -	SWE; 5	FIN; 8	GBR; 2	GER; 3	CZE -	YUG -	48	6th	0
1978	350cc	Yamaha	VEN -		AUT -	FRA; 4	NAT -	NED; 6		SWE; 5	FIN; 3	GBR; 2	GER; 5	CZE; 8	YUG -	50	5th	0
1978	500cc	Suzuki	VEN -	ESP -	AUT -	FRA -	NAT -	NED -	BEL; 9	SWE -	FIN -	GBR -	GER -			2	26th	0
1979	500cc	Suzuki	VEN; 3	AUT; 4	GER -	NAT; 3	ESP -	YUG -	NED -	BEL -	SWE -	FIN -	GBR -	FRA -		28	10th	0
