= Kork Ballington =

South African motorcycle racer

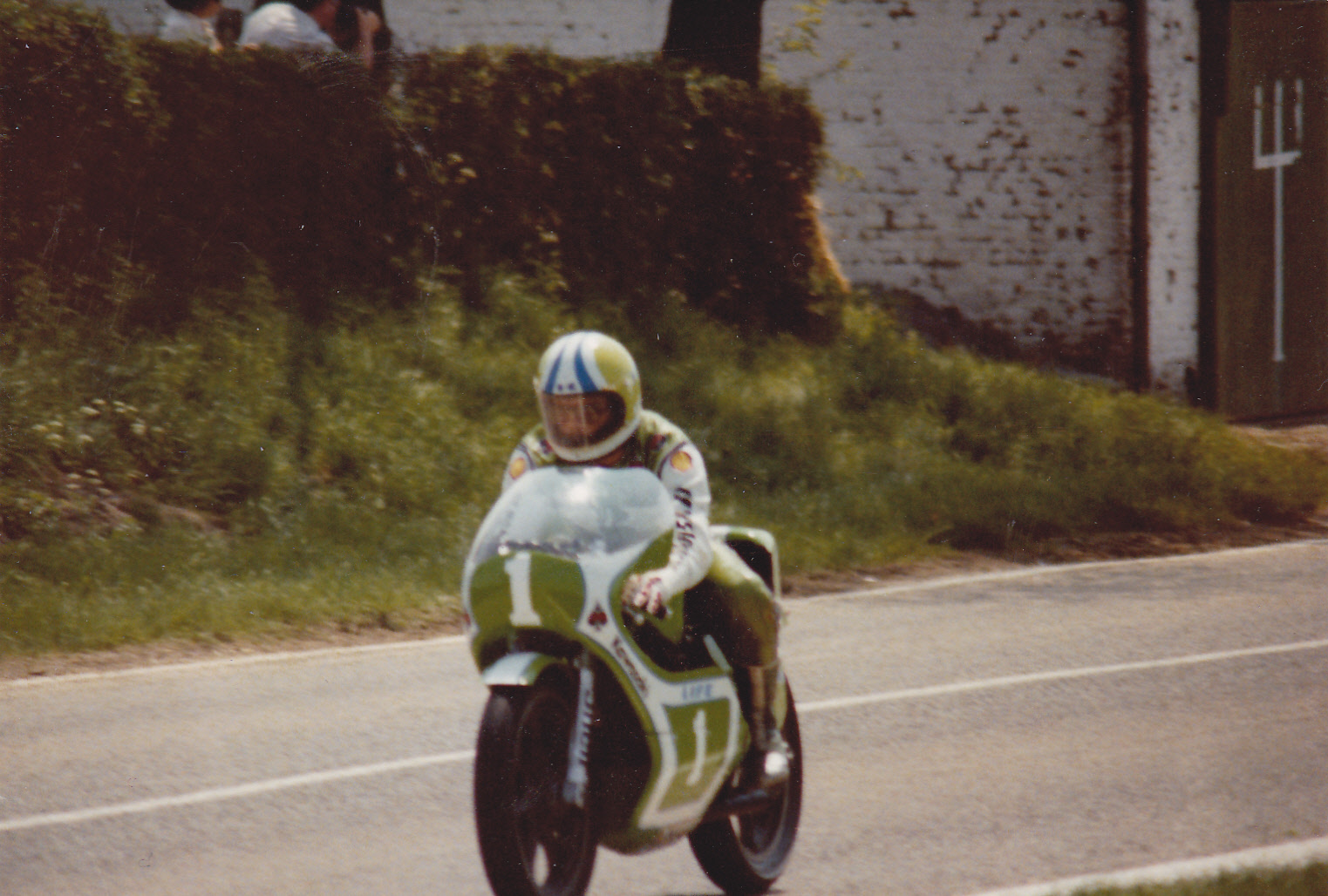
- Ballington in 1978 racing on the Chimay Street Circuit in Belgium.
- Nationality: South African
- Born: 10 April 1951 (age 75); Salisbury, Southern Rhodesia
Motorcycle racing career statistics
Grand Prix motorcycle racing
Active years	1976–1982
First race	1976 350cc Nations Grand Prix
Last race	1982 500cc San Marino Grand Prix
First win	1976 350cc Spanish Grand Prix
Last win	1980 250cc West German Grand Prix
Team	Kawasaki
Championships	250cc – 1978, 1979 350cc – 1978, 1979
Starts / Wins / Podiums / Poles / F. laps / Points; 85 / 31 / 46 / 8 / 15 / 802

Hugh Neville "Kork" Ballington (born 10 April 1951) is a South African former professional motorcycle racer. He competed in the Grand Prix motorcycle racing world championships from 1976 to 1982, most prominently as a member of the Kawasaki factory racing team with whom he won four FIM road racing world championships. Ballington was inducted into the MotoGP Legends Hall of Fame in 2018.

== Motorcycle racing career ==
Born in Salisbury, Southern Rhodesia, Ballington's family emigrated to South Africa when he was young. He used his domestic production road racing experience as a springboard to gain entry into the British domestic racing competitions.

In 1976, Ballington began competing in the world championships, taking his first podium position when he scored a second place result in the 250cc German Grand Prix held at the daunting, 14.2 miles (22.9 km) long Nürburgring racetrack, considered too dangerous for the Formula One championship. He followed this performance by winning the 1976 350cc Spanish Grand Prix held on the challenging Montjuïc circuit in Barcelona.

Ballington continued to improve in 1977 by winning three Grand Prix races including at the 1977 British Grand Prix where, he scored a double victory by winning both the 250cc and 350cc classes. For the 1978 season, Ballington was offered a position with the Kawasaki factory racing team riding Kawasaki KR250 and KR350s alongside Mick Grant and Barry Ditchburn.

After a slow start to the season, Ballington won four 250cc Grand Prix races along with two second places and two third places to claim his first 250cc World Championship. Ballington was even more dominant in the 350cc class where he won six times along with three second places finishes to claim the 350cc world championship. The 1979 season was equally as successful for Ballington, winning seven 250cc Grand Prix races and five 350cc Grand Prix races to claim his second consecutive double world championships.

In 1980, Ballngton finished second to Anton Mang in the 250cc world championship, and campaigned Kawasaki's new KR500 in the premier 500cc division. However, developing a new bike in the premier class proved to be difficult, and after three years Kawasaki was unable to recreate the same success they had experienced in the smaller classes although, they were more successful competing in the 1982 ACU 500cc British National Championship where, Ballington won six consecutive races to win the title for Kawasaki. After three seasons without making significant gains on their competition, Kawasaki made the decision to withdraw from world championship competition after the 1982 season leaving Ballington without a job.

In 1984, Ballington entered the Suzuka 8 Hours endurance race riding a Kawasaki GPZ750 with teammate Rob Phillis however, they retired after completing only 15 laps. He then raced in the Daytona 200 for the first time, riding a Suzuki GSX-R750 for the British-based Skoal Bandit Suzuki team in 1986. He placed third in his qualifying race behind the Yamaha factory teammates Eddie Lawson and Jimmy Filice but, retired from the main event after completing 37 laps.

Ballington's Daytona performance earned him a position with the MacLean Racing Team riding a Honda RS500 in the 1986 AMA Formula One Championship. Ballington fought with Randy Renfrow in a season long battle before finishing the season in second place. He returned in 1987 to compete on a Honda NSR250 in the AMA 250cc road racing national championship where he finished second to John Kocinski. Ballington competed in the 1988 AMA 250cc road racing national championship before making the decision to retire.

Ballington now lives with his family in Brisbane, Australia. In 2018, the FIM inducted him into the MotoGP Legends Hall of Fame.

== Motorcycle Grand Prix results ==
**Position**	1	2	3	4	5	6	7	8	9	10
**Points**	15	12	10	8	6	5	4	3	2	1

(key) (Races in bold indicate pole position; races in italics indicate fastest lap)

Year	Class	Team	1	2	3	4	5	6	7	8	9	10	11	12	13	Points	Rank	Wins
1976	250cc	Yamaha	FRA -	NAT; Ret	YUG -	IOM -	NED -	BEL -	SWE -	FIN -	CZE -	GER; 2	ESP; 8			15	13th	0
1976	350cc	Yamaha	FRA -	NAT; 6	YUG -	IOM -	NED -	BEL -	SWE -	FIN -	CZE -	GER; 12	ESP; 1			20	12th	1
1977	250cc	Yamaha	VEN; 5		GER; 6	NAT -	ESP; 11	FRA -	YUG -	NED -	BEL; 6	SWE -	FIN; 3	CZE; 4	GBR; 1	49	6th	1
1977	350cc	Yamaha	VEN -	AUT -	GER -	NAT -	ESP -	FRA -		NED; 1		SWE; 2	FIN; 13	CZE; 7	GBR; 1	46	5th	2
1978	250cc	Kawasaki	VEN; 5	ESP; 4		FRA; 3	NAT; 1	NED; 2	**BEL**; 5	**SWE**; 2	FIN; 1	GBR -	GER; 1	**CZE**; 1	**YUG**; 3	124	**1st**	4
1978	350cc	Kawasaki	VEN; 4		AUT; 1	FRA; 2	NAT; 1	NED; 1		SWE; 2	FIN; 1	GBR; 1	GER; 2	CZE; 1	YUG -	134	**1st**	6
1979	250cc	Kawasaki	VEN; 2		GER; 1	**NAT**; 1	ESP; 1	YUG; 4	**NED**; 3	BEL; DNS	SWE; 5	FIN; 1	**GBR**; 1	CZE; 1	FRA; 1	141	**1st**	7
1979	350cc	Kawasaki	VEN; 4	AUT; 1	GER; 4	NAT -	ESP; 1	YUG; 1	NED -			FIN; 9	GBR; 1	CZE; 1	FRA; 5	99	**1st**	5
1980	250cc	Kawasaki	NAT -	**ESP**; 1	FRA; 1	YUG -	NED -	BEL -	FIN; 1	GBR; 1	CZE; 2	GER; 1				87	**2nd**	5
1980	500cc	Kawasaki	NAT; NC	ESP; 13	FRA; 8		NED -	BEL -	FIN; 5	GBR; 7		GER; 6				13	12th	0
1981	500cc	Kawasaki	AUT; 6	GER; NC	NAT -	FRA; 7	YUG -	NED; 3	BEL -	RSM; 5	GBR; NC	FIN; 3	SWE; 4			43	8th	0
1982	500cc	Kawasaki	ARG; 8	AUT; NC	FRA -	ESP; 9	NAT; 6	NED; 7	BEL; 8	YUG; 10	GBR; 7	SWE; 6	RSM; 7	GER -		31	9th	0
