= 1980 Nations motorcycle Grand Prix =

(Italy) 1980 Nations Grand Prix
Race details
- Race 1 of 10 races in the 1980 Grand Prix motorcycle racing season
- Date: 11 May 1980
- Official name: Gran Premio delle Nazioni
- Location: Circuito Internazionale Santa Monica
- Course: Permanent racing facility; 3.488 km (2.167 mi)

500cc
Pole position
- Rider: (Italy) Marco Lucchinelli
- Time: 1:22.470
Fastest lap
- Rider: (United States) Kenny Roberts
- Time: 1:22.400
Podium
- First: (United States) Kenny Roberts
- Second: (Italy) Franco Uncini
- Third: (Italy) Graziano Rossi

350cc
Pole position
- Rider: (Venezuela) Johnny Cecotto
- Time: 1:24.140
Fastest lap
- Rider: (Venezuela) Carlos Lavado
- Time: 1:24.540
Podium
- First: (Venezuela) Johnny Cecotto
- Second: (Italy) Massimo Matteoni
- Third: (Italy) Walter Villa

250cc
Pole position
- Rider: (West Germany) Anton Mang
- Time: 1:25.710
Fastest lap
- Rider: (South Africa) Kork Ballington
- Time: 1:26.720
Podium
- First: (West Germany) Anton Mang
- Second: (France) Jean-François Baldé
- Third: (Italy) Pierluigi Conforti

125cc
Pole position
- Rider: (Italy) Pier Paolo Bianchi
- Time: 1:30.000
Fastest lap
- Rider: (Italy) Pier Paolo Bianchi
- Time: 1:30.580
Podium
- First: (Italy) Pier Paolo Bianchi
- Second: (France) Guy Bertin
- Third: (Switzerland) Bruno Kneubühler

50cc
Pole position
- Rider: (Italy) Eugenio Lazzarini
- Time: 1:41.920
Fastest lap
- Rider: (Switzerland) Stefan Dörflinger
- Time: 1:40.600
Podium
- First: (Italy) Eugenio Lazzarini
- Second: (Netherlands) Theo Timmer
- Third: (Austria) Hans-Jürgen Hummel

The 1980 Nations motorcycle Grand Prix was the first round of the 1980 Grand Prix motorcycle racing season. It took place on the weekend of 9–11 May 1980 at the Circuito Internazionale Santa Monica.

It was the first time the venue hosted a motorcycle World Championship Grand Prix event.

== Classification ==
=== 500 cc ===
Pos.	Rider	Team	Manufacturer	Time/Retired	Points
1	(United States) Kenny Roberts	Yamaha Motor Company	Yamaha	55'57.660	15
2	(Italy) Franco Uncini		Suzuki	+16.740	12
3	(Italy) Graziano Rossi	Team Nava Olio Fiat	Suzuki	+28.640	10
4	(Venezuela) Johnny Cecotto	Venemotos Racing Team	Yamaha	+32.240	8
5	(Italy) Carlo Perugini		Suzuki	+42.340	6
6	(Japan) Takazumi Katayama		Suzuki	+46.840	5
7	(United Kingdom) Barry Sheene		Yamaha	+1'01.940	4
8	(France) Christian Estrosi	Team Furygan Suzuki	Suzuki	+1 lap	3
9	(Switzerland) Philippe Coulon	Marlboro Nava Frankonia	Suzuki	+1 lap	2
10	(Switzerland) Sergio Pellandini		Suzuki	+1 lap	1
11	(Italy) Maurizio Massimiani	Scuderia Naldoni Imola	Yamaha	+1 lap	
12	(Italy) Franco Bonera		Yamaha	+1 lap	
13	(Italy) Guido Paci		Suzuki	+1 lap	
14	(Belgium) Richard Hubin		Yamaha	+3 laps	
Ret	(France) Patrick Fernandez	Ecurie Ste Pernod	Yamaha	Retired	
Ret	(Italy) Carlo Prati		Suzuki	Retired	
Ret	(Italy) Marco Lucchinelli	Team Nava Olio Fiat	Suzuki	Retired	
Ret	(France) Raymond Roche	Team Sonauto Gauloises	Yamaha	Retired	
Ret	(United States) Randy Mamola		Suzuki	Retired	
Ret	(France) Bernard Fau	GME Motul GPA	Suzuki	Retired	
Ret	(Netherlands) Boet van Dulmen		Yamaha	Retired	
Ret	(New Zealand) Graeme Crosby	Texaco Heron Team Suzuki	Suzuki	Retired	
Ret	(Italy) Gianni Rolando		Suzuki	Retired	
Ret	(Italy) Gianni Pelletier	Morbidelli	Morbidelli	Retired	
Ret	(Netherlands) Wil Hartog	Riemersma Racing	Suzuki	Retired	
Ret	(France) Patrick Pons	Team Sonauto Gauloises	Yamaha	Retired	
Ret	(Switzerland) Michel Frutschi	Elf Motor Racing Team	Yamaha	Retired	
Ret	(South Africa) Kork Ballington	Team Kawasaki	Kawasaki	Retired	
Ret	(Japan) Sadao Asami		Yamaha	Retired	
Ret	(France) Christian Sarron	Team Sonauto Gauloises	Yamaha	Retired	
DNS	(Netherlands) Jack Middelburg	Yamaha IMN	Yamaha	Did not start	
DNQ	(France) Michel Rougerie	Ecurie Ste Pernod	Suzuki	Did not qualify	
DNQ	(Austria) Werner Nenning	Mobel Nenning Racing Team	Yamaha	Did not qualify	
DNQ	(Finland) Seppo Rossi		Suzuki	Did not qualify	
DNQ	(Australia) Jeff Sayle	George Beale Team Castrol	Yamaha	Did not qualify	
DNQ	(Finland) Markku Matikainen		Suzuki	Did not qualify	
DNQ	(Venezuela) Roberto Pietri		Suzuki	Did not qualify	
DNQ	(Brazil) Marco Greco		Yamaha	Did not qualify	

Previous race: 1979 French Grand Prix	FIM Grand Prix World Championship; 1980 season	Next race: 1980 Spanish Grand Prix
Previous race: 1979 Nations Grand Prix	Italian Grand Prix	Next race: 1981 Nations Grand Prix
