= 1980 Spanish motorcycle Grand Prix =

Spanish motorcycle

(Spain) 1980 Spanish Grand Prix
Race details
- Race 2 of 10 races in the 1980 Grand Prix motorcycle racing season
- Date: 18 May 1980
- Official name: Gran Premio de España
- Location: Circuito Permanente del Jarama
- Course: Permanent racing facility; 3.404 km (2.115 mi)

500cc
Pole position
- Rider: (United States) Kenny Roberts
- Time: 1:31.790
Fastest lap
- Rider: (United States) Kenny Roberts
- Time: 1:31.550
Podium
- First: (United States) Kenny Roberts
- Second: (Italy) Marco Lucchinelli
- Third: (United States) Randy Mamola

350cc
Pole position
- Rider: No 350cc race was held
Fastest lap
- Rider: No 350cc race was held
Podium
- First: No 350cc race was held
- Second: No 350cc race was held
- Third: No 350cc race was held

250cc
Pole position
- Rider: (South Africa) Kork Ballington
- Time: 1:35.910
Fastest lap
- Rider: (South Africa) Kork Ballington
- Time: 1:35.770
Podium
- First: (South Africa) Kork Ballington
- Second: (West Germany) Anton Mang
- Third: (France) Thierry Espié

125cc
Pole position
- Rider: (Italy) Pier Paolo Bianchi
- Time: 1:39.860
Fastest lap
- Rider: (France) Guy Bertin
- Time: 1:39.050
Podium
- First: (Italy) Pier Paolo Bianchi
- Second: (Venezuela) Iván Palazzese
- Third: (Switzerland) Bruno Kneubühler

50cc
Pole position
- Rider: (Spain) Ricardo Tormo
- Time: 1:51.050
Fastest lap
- Rider: (Italy) Eugenio Lazzarini
- Time: 1:50.100
Podium
- First: (Italy) Eugenio Lazzarini
- Second: (Switzerland) Stefan Dörflinger
- Third: (Netherlands) Henk van Kessel

The 1980 Spanish motorcycle Grand Prix was the second round of the 1980 Grand Prix motorcycle racing season. It took place on the weekend of 16–18 May 1980 at the Circuito Permanente del Jarama.

== Classification ==
=== 500 cc ===
Pos	Rider	Manufacturer	Time/Retired	Points
1	(United States) Kenny Roberts	Yamaha Motor Company	55'59.570	15
2	(Italy) Marco Lucchinelli	Team Nava Olio Fiat	+4.140	12
3	(United States) Randy Mamola	Suzuki	+18.750	10
4	(Japan) Takazumi Katayama	Suzuki	+22.200	8
5	(United Kingdom) Barry Sheene	Yamaha Motor Company	+49.680	6
6	(Venezuela) Johnny Cecotto	Venemotos Racing Team	+53.500	5
7	(Italy) Franco Uncini	Suzuki	+58.080	4
8	(Switzerland) Philippe Coulon	Marlboro Nava Frankonia	+59.850	3
9	(Switzerland) Michel Frutschi	Elf Motor Racing Team	+1'13.140	2
10	(Italy) Carlo Perugini	Suzuki	+1'18.000	1
11	(France) Michel Rougerie	Ecurie Ste Pernod	+1'21.510	
12	(New Zealand) Graeme Crosby	Texaco Heron Team Suzuki	+1'21.910	
13	(South Africa) Kork Ballington	Team Kawasaki	+1'24.930	
14	(Finland) Seppo Rossi	Suzuki	+1 lap	
15	(Netherlands) Jack Middelburg	Yamaha IMN	+1 lap	
16	(France) Christian Estrosi	Team Furygan Suzuki	+1 lap	
17	(France) Hubert Rigal	Moto Club de Monaco	+1 lap	
18	(Netherlands) Boet van Dulmen	Yamaha Motor Company	+1 lap	
19	(Finland) Markku Matikainen	Saga Racing	+1 lap	
Ret	(Japan) Sadao Asami	Yamaha Motor Company	Retired	
Ret	(Italy) Gianni Rolando	Suzuki	Retired	
Ret	(Austria) Werner Nenning	Mobel Nenning Racing Team	Retired	
Ret	(France) Patrick Fernandez	Ecurie Ste Pernod	Retired	
Ret	(France) Bernard Fau	GME Motul GPA	Retired	
Ret	(Italy) Graziano Rossi	Team Nava Olio Fiat	Accident	
Ret	(Switzerland) Sergio Pellandini	Suzuki	Retired	
Ret	(Netherlands) Wil Hartog	Riemersma Racing	Accident	
Ret	(Belgium) Richard Hubin	Yamaha Motor Company	Retired	
Ret	(United States) Skip Aksland	Yamaha Motor Company	Accident	
Ret	(France) Christian Sarron	Team Sonauto Gauloises	Retired	
DNQ	(Italy) Gianni Pelletier	Morbidelli	Did not qualify	
DNQ	(Sweden) Peter Sjöström	Suzuki	Did not qualify	
DNQ	(West Germany) Elmar Renner	Suzuki	Did not qualify	

Previous race: 1980 Nations Grand Prix	FIM Grand Prix World Championship; 1980 season	Next race: 1980 French Grand Prix
Previous race: 1979 Spanish Grand Prix	Spanish Grand Prix	Next race: 1981 Spanish Grand Prix
