= 1975 Austrian motorcycle Grand Prix =

(Austria) 1975 Austrian Grand Prix
Race details
- Race 3 of 12 races in the 1975 Grand Prix motorcycle racing season
- Date: 4 May 1975
- Official name: Austrian Grand Prix/Grosser Preis von Österreich
- Location: Salzburgring
- Course: Permanent racing facility; 4.241 km (2.635 mi)

500cc
Pole position
- Rider: (Italy) Giacomo Agostini
- Time: Unknown
Fastest lap
- Rider: (Italy) Giacomo Agostini
- Time: 1:21.780
Podium
- First: (Japan) Hideo Kanaya
- Second: (Finland) Teuvo Länsivuori
- Third: (United Kingdom) Phil Read

350cc
Pole position
- Rider: (Japan) Hideo Kanaya
- Time: Unknown
Fastest lap
- Rider: (Japan) Hideo Kanaya
- Time: 1:23.850
Podium
- First: (Japan) Hideo Kanaya
- Second: (South Africa) Jon Ekerold
- Third: (Brazil) Adu Celso-Santos

250cc
Pole position
- Rider: None
- Time: None
Fastest lap
- Rider: None
- Time: None
Podium
- First: None
- Second: None
- Third: None

125cc
Pole position
- Rider: (Italy) Pier Paolo Bianchi
- Time: 1:31.020
Fastest lap
- Rider: (Italy) Pier Paolo Bianchi
- Time: 1:31.690
Podium
- First: (Italy) Paolo Pileri
- Second: (Italy) Pier Paolo Bianchi
- Third: (Netherlands) Henk van Kessel

50cc
Pole position
- Rider: None
- Time: None
Fastest lap
- Rider: None
- Time: None
Podium
- First: None
- Second: None
- Third: None

The 1975 Austrian motorcycle Grand Prix was the second round of the 1975 Grand Prix motorcycle racing season. It took place on the weekend of 2–4 May 1975 at the Salzburgring.

== 500cc classification ==
| Pos. | Rider | Team | Manufacturer | Time/Retired | Points |
|---|---|---|---|---|---|
| 1 | (Japan) Hideo Kanaya | Yamaha Motor NV | Yamaha | 59'53.440 | 15 |
| 2 | (Finland) Teuvo Länsivuori | Suzuki Motor Company | Suzuki | +11.620 | 12 |
| 3 | (United Kingdom) Phil Read | MV Agusta | MV Agusta | +22.970 | 10 |
| 4 | (Italy) Armando Toracca | | MV Agusta | +50.570 | 8 |
| 5 | (West Germany) Horst Lahfeld | | König | +1 lap | 6 |
| 6 | (West Germany) Dieter Braun | Mitsui Maschinen | Yamaha | +1 lap | 5 |
| 7 | (Austria) Karl Auer | Racing Team NO | Yamaha | +1 lap | 4 |
| 8 | (United Kingdom) Tom Herron | | Yamaha | +1 lap | 3 |
| 9 | (United Kingdom) Alex George | | Yamaha | +1 lap | 2 |
| 10 | (France) Thierry Tchernine | | Yamaha | +1 lap | 1 |
| 11 | (United Kingdom) Charlie Williams | | Yamaha | +1 lap | |
| 12 | (West Germany) Reinhard Hiller | | König | +1 lap | |
| 13 | (West Germany) Helmut Kassner | | Yamaha | +1 lap | |
| 14 | (West Germany) Alfred Bajohr | | König | +1 lap | |
| 15 | (Austria) Hans Braumandl | | Yamaha | +1 lap | |
| 16 | (Netherlands) Boet van Dulmen | | Yamaha | +1 lap | |
| 17 | (West Germany) Frank Fellmann | | König | +1 lap | |
| 18 | (West Germany) Edmund Czihak | | König | +1 lap | |
| 19 | (Austria) Max Wiener | | Rotax | +1 lap | |
| 20 | (Czechoslovakia) Peter Baláž | | Yamaha | +1 lap | |
| 21 | (West Germany) Walter Kaletsch | | Yamaha | +1 lap | |
| Ret | (United States) Gary Scott | | Harley-Davidson | Retired | |
| Ret | (West Germany) Ernst Hiller | | König | Retired | |
| Ret | (Austria) Michael Schmid | Racing Team NO | Rotax | Retired | |
| Ret | (United Kingdom) John Newbold | | Suzuki | Retired | |
| Ret | (United Kingdom) Stan Woods | | Suzuki | Retired | |
| Ret | (Brazil) Adu Celso-Santos | Carvalho Racing | Yamaha | Retired | |
| Ret | (United Kingdom) Chas Mortimer | Carvalho Racing | Yamaha | Retired | |
| Ret | (Austria) Franz Laimbock | | Yamaha | Retired | |
| Ret | (Italy) Giacomo Agostini | Yamaha Motor NV | Yamaha | Retired | |
| Ret | (Switzerland) Hans Stadelmann | | Yamaha | Retired | |
| Ret | (Australia) Jack Findlay | | Yamaha | Retired | |
| Ret | (United Kingdom) John Williams | | Yamaha | Retired | |
| Ret | (France) Patrick Pons | Equipe Sonauto BP Gauloises | Yamaha | Retired | |
| Ret | (United Kingdom) Steve Ellis | | Yamaha | Retired | |
| Ret | (Spain) Víctor Palomo | | Yamaha | Retired | |
| DNS | (United Kingdom) Barry Sheene | Suzuki Motor Company | Suzuki | Did not start | |

| Previous race: 1975 Spanish Grand Prix | FIM Grand Prix World Championship; 1975 season | Next race: 1975 German Grand Prix |
| Previous race: 1974 Austrian Grand Prix | Austrian Grand Prix | Next race: 1976 Austrian Grand Prix |
