= 1979 German motorcycle Grand Prix =

(West Germany) 1979 German Grand Prix
Race details
- Race 3 of 13 races in the 1979 Grand Prix motorcycle racing season
- Date: 6 May 1979
- Official name: Großer Preis von Deutschland
- Location: Hockenheimring
- Course: Permanent racing facility; 6.789 km (4.218 mi)

500cc
Pole position
- Rider: (United Kingdom) Barry Sheene
- Time: 2:16.100
Fastest lap
- Rider: (United States) Kenny Roberts
- Time: 2:12.400
Podium
- First: (Netherlands) Wil Hartog
- Second: (United States) Kenny Roberts
- Third: (Italy) Virginio Ferrari

350cc
Pole position
- Rider: (Italy) Walter Villa
- Time: 2:18.400
Fastest lap
- Rider: (Switzerland) Michel Frutschi
- Time: 2:18.000
Podium
- First: (South Africa) Jon Ekerold
- Second: (West Germany) Anton Mang
- Third: (Switzerland) Michel Frutschi

250cc
Pole position
- Rider: (Italy) Walter Villa
- Time: 2:25.300
Fastest lap
- Rider: (South Africa) Kork Ballington
- Time: 2.22.600
Podium
- First: (South Africa) Kork Ballington
- Second: (United States) Randy Mamola
- Third: (West Germany) Anton Mang

125cc
Pole position
- Rider: (Spain) Ángel Nieto
- Time: 2:34.000
Fastest lap
- Rider: (Spain) Ángel Nieto
- Time: 2:30.400
Podium
- First: (Spain) Ángel Nieto
- Second: (Austria) Harald Bartol
- Third: (West Germany) Walter Koschine

50cc
Pole position
- Rider: (Spain) Ricardo Tormo
- Time: 2:49.900
Fastest lap
- Rider: (Spain) Ricardo Tormo
- Time: 2:48.600
Podium
- First: (West Germany) Gerhard Waibel
- Second: (Netherlands) Peter Looijesteijn
- Third: (West Germany) Ingo Emmerich

The 1979 German motorcycle Grand Prix was the third round of the 1979 Grand Prix motorcycle racing season. It took place on the weekend of 4–6 May 1979 at the Hockenheimring.

== Classification ==
=== 500 cc ===
Pos.	Rider	Team	Manufacturer	Time/Retired	Points
1	(Netherlands) Wil Hartog	Riemersma Racing	Suzuki	42'33.900	15
2	(United States) Kenny Roberts	Yamaha Motor Company	Yamaha	+3.600	12
3	(Italy) Virginio Ferrari	Team Gallina Nava Olio Fiat	Suzuki	+12.500	10
4	(France) Bernard Fau	Suzuki France	Suzuki	+25.900	8
5	(Switzerland) Philippe Coulon		Suzuki	+27.900	6
6	(Italy) Franco Uncini	Team Zago International	Suzuki	+47.400	5
7	(Netherlands) Jack Middelburg		Suzuki	+48.800	4
8	(France) Christian Sarron	Team Sonauto Gauloises	Yamaha	+1'05.100	3
9	(United Kingdom) Steve Parrish	Texaco Heron Team Suzuki	Suzuki	+1'06.200	2
10	(United States) Mike Baldwin	Serge Zago	Suzuki	+1'27.200	1
11	(New Zealand) Dennis Ireland	Derry's Racing	Suzuki	+1 lap	
12	(West Germany) Elmar Renner	Moto Team Krawehl	Suzuki	+1 lap	
13	(Netherlands) Henk de Vries	Team 77	Suzuki	+1 lap	
14	(West Germany) Gerhard Vogt	Bill Smith Racing	Suzuki	+1 lap	
15	(West Germany) Hans-Otto Butenuth		Suzuki	+1 lap	
16	(Austria) Max Nothiger		Suzuki	+1 lap	
17	(Austria) Herbert Schieferecke		Suzuki	+1 lap	
18	(Sweden) Bo Granath		Suzuki	+2 laps	
19	(West Germany) King Wong Kwong		Suzuki	+2 laps	
20	(Netherlands) Michael Schmid		Suzuki	+2 laps	
Ret	(Austria) Max Wiener		Suzuki	Retired	
Ret	(United Kingdom) Barry Sheene	Texaco Heron Team Suzuki	Suzuki	Retired	
Ret	(Netherlands) Boet van Dulmen		Suzuki	Retired	
Ret	(Italy) Graziano Rossi	Morbidelli	Morbidelli	Retired	
Ret	(Italy) Gianni Pelletier		Suzuki	Retired	
Ret	(United Kingdom) Tom Herron	Texaco Heron Team Suzuki	Suzuki	Retired	
Ret	(West Germany) Max Steiner		Suzuki	Retitred	
Ret	(Italy) Marco Lucchinelli		Suzuki	Retired	
Ret	(Denmark) Børge Nielsen		Suzuki	Retired	
Ret	(France) Michel Rougerie		Suzuki	Retired	
Ret	(United Kingdom) Mick Grant		Suzuki	Retired	
Ret	(West Germany) Hans Schofer		Yamaha	Retired	
Ret	(West Germany) Gustav Reiner	Dieter Braun Team	Suzuki	Retired	
Ret	(United Kingdom) Alex George		Suzuki	Retired	
Ret	(Japan) Hiroyuki Kawasaki	Texaco Heron Team Suzuki	Suzuki	Retired	
Ret	(Finland) Seppo Ojala		Suzuki	Retired	
Ret	(Italy) Carlo Perugini		Suzuki	Retired	
Ret	(Italy) Sandro Moro		Suzuki	Retired	
Ret	(Italy) Carlo Prati		Suzuki	Retired	
Ret	(Italy) Stefano Bonetti		Suzuki	Retired	
DNS	(Italy) Gianni Rolando	Scuderia Naldoni	Suzuki	Did not start	
DNS	(Sweden) Peter Sjöström	Ava MC Stockholm	Suzuki	Did not start	
DNQ	(West Germany) Egid Schwemmer		Yamaha	Did not qualify	

Previous race: 1979 Austrian Grand Prix	FIM Grand Prix World Championship; 1979 season	Next race: 1979 Nations Grand Prix
Previous race: 1978 German Grand Prix	German Grand Prix	Next race: 1980 German Grand Prix
