= 1980 French motorcycle Grand Prix =

(France) 1980 French Grand Prix
Race details
- Race 3 of 10 races in the 1980 Grand Prix motorcycle racing season
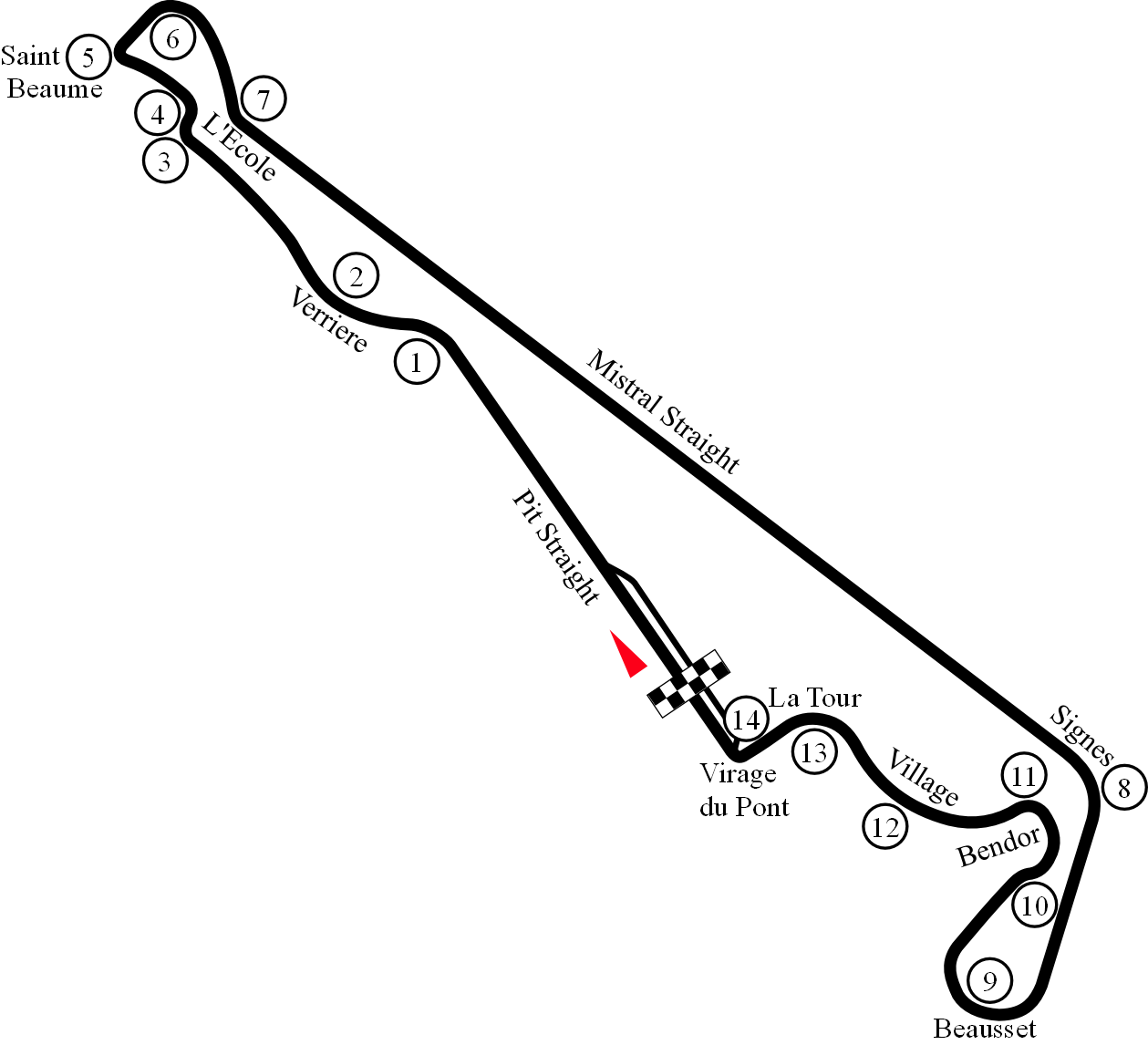
- Date: 25 May 1980
- Official name: Grand Prix de France Moto
- Location: Circuit Paul Ricard
- Course: Permanent racing facility; 5.809 km (3.610 mi)

500cc
Pole position
- Rider: (Italy) Marco Lucchinelli
- Time: 2:03.420
Fastest lap
- Rider: (United States) Kenny Roberts
- Time: 2:04.790
Podium
- First: (United States) Kenny Roberts
- Second: (United States) Randy Mamola
- Third: (Italy) Marco Lucchinelli

350cc
Pole position
- Rider: (Venezuela) Johnny Cecotto
- Time: 2:09.910
Fastest lap
- Rider: (South Africa) Jon Ekerold
Podium
- First: (South Africa) Jon Ekerold
- Second: (Venezuela) Johnny Cecotto
- Third: (France) Éric Saul

250cc
Pole position
- Rider: (West Germany) Anton Mang
- Time: 2:12.270
Fastest lap
- Rider: (France) Thierry Espié
- Time: 2:12.960
Podium
- First: (South Africa) Kork Ballington
- Second: (West Germany) Anton Mang
- Third: (France) Thierry Espié

125cc
Pole position
- Rider: (France) Guy Bertin
- Time: 2:18.980
Fastest lap
- Rider: (Spain) Ángel Nieto
- Time: 2:18.750
Podium
- First: (Spain) Ángel Nieto
- Second: (Italy) Pier Paolo Bianchi
- Third: (Italy) Loris Reggiani

50cc
Pole position
- Rider: No 50cc race was held
Fastest lap
- Rider: No 50cc race was held
Podium
- First: No 50cc race was held
- Second: No 50cc race was held
- Third: No 50cc race was held

The 1980 French motorcycle Grand Prix was the third round of the 1980 Grand Prix motorcycle racing season. It took place on the weekend of 23–25 May 1980 at the Paul Ricard Circuit.

== Classification ==
=== 500 cc ===
Pos	Rider	Manufacturer	Time/Retired	Points
1	(United States) Kenny Roberts	Yamaha Motor Company	44'13.980	15
2	(United States) Randy Mamola	Suzuki	+5.380	12
3	(Italy) Marco Lucchinelli	Team Nava Olio Fiat	+5.790	10
4	(Italy) Graziano Rossi	Team Nava Olio Fiat	+45.900	8
5	(New Zealand) Graeme Crosby	Texaco Heron Team Suzuki	+53.870	6
6	(Japan) Takazumi Katayama	Suzuki	+55.190	5
7	(France) Michel Rougerie	Ecurie Ste Pernod	+1'07.860	4
8	(South Africa) Kork Ballington	Team Kawasaki	+1'10.250	3
9	(Venezuela) Johnny Cecotto	Venemotos Racing Team	+1'12.950	2
10	(France) Patrick Pons	Team Sonauto Gauloises	+1'13.500	1
11	(France) Raymond Roche	Team Sonauto Gauloises	+1'14.430	
12	(Japan) Sadao Asami	Yamaha Motor Company	+1'17.280	
13	(Italy) Carlo Perugini	Suzuki	+1'19.020	
14	(Finland) Seppo Rossi	Suzuki	+1'20.580	
15	(France) Bernard Fau	GME Motul GPA	+1'26.960	
16	(Switzerland) Philippe Coulon	Marlboro Nava Frankonia	+1'34.200	
17	(Italy) Franco Bonera	Yamaha	+1'40.490	
18	(Netherlands) Willem Zoet	Stimorol Racing	+1'44.020	
19	(Netherlands) Boet van Dulmen	Yamaha Motor Company	+2'10.370	
20	(Finland) Markku Matikainen	Saga Racing	+2'23.560	
21	(Switzerland) Sergio Pellandini	Suzuki	+1 lap	
22	(Switzerland) Michel Frutschi	Elf Motor Racing Team	+1 lap	
23	(Italy) Maurizio Massimiani	Scuderia Naldoni Imola	+1 lap	
24	(France) Franck Gross	Suzuki	+1 lap	
25	(Netherlands) Jack Middelburg	Yamaha IMN	+2 laps	
NC	(Italy) Guido Paci	Suzuki	Not classified	
Ret	(France) Hubert Rigal	Moto Club de Monaco	Retired	
Ret	(United Kingdom) Barry Sheene	Yamaha Motor Company	Retired	
Ret	(France) Christian Estrosi	Team Furygan Suzuki	Retired	
Ret	(Italy) Franco Uncini	Suzuki	Retired	
Ret	(France) Patrick Fernandez	Ecurie Ste Pernod	Retired	
DNQ	(Italy) Gianni Pelletier	Morbidelli	Did not qualify	
DNQ	(Sweden) Peter Sjöström	Suzuki	Did not qualify	

Previous race: 1980 Spanish Grand Prix	FIM Grand Prix World Championship; 1980 season	Next race: 1980 Yugoslavian Grand Prix
Previous race: 1979 French Grand Prix	French Grand Prix	Next race: 1981 French Grand Prix
