= 1978 French motorcycle Grand Prix =

(France) 1978 French Grand Prix
Race details
- Race 4 of 13 races in the 1978 Grand Prix motorcycle racing season
- Date: 7 May 1978
- Official name: Grand Prix de France
- Location: Circuit de Nogaro
- Course: Permanent racing facility; 3.120 km (1.939 mi)

500cc
Pole position
- Rider: (Venezuela) Johnny Cecotto
- Time: 1:24.850
Fastest lap
- Rider: (United States) Kenny Roberts
- Time: 1:22.800
Podium
- First: (United States) Kenny Roberts
- Second: (United States) Pat Hennen
- Third: (United Kingdom) Barry Sheene

350cc
Pole position
- Rider: (France) Olivier Chevallier
- Time: 1:26.450
Fastest lap
- Rider: (Australia) Gregg Hansford
- Time: 1:24.500
Podium
- First: (Australia) Gregg Hansford
- Second: (South Africa) Kork Ballington
- Third: (South Africa) Jon Ekerold

250cc
Pole position
- Rider: (France) Patrick Fernandez
- Time: 1:27.690
Fastest lap
- Rider: (Australia) Gregg Hansford
- Time: 1:25.800
Podium
- First: (Australia) Gregg Hansford
- Second: (United States) Kenny Roberts
- Third: (South Africa) Kork Ballington

125cc
Pole position
- Rider: (France) Thierry Espié
- Time: 1:31.760
Fastest lap
- Rider: (Italy) Pierpaolo Bianchi
- Time: 1:30.300
Podium
- First: (Italy) Pierpaolo Bianchi
- Second: (Italy) Eugenio Lazzarini
- Third: (Sweden) Per-Edward Carlsson

Sidecar (B2A)
Pole position
- Rider: (France) Alain Michel
- Passenger: (United Kingdom) Stu Collins
- Time: 1:29.100
Fastest lap
- Rider: (Switzerland) Rolf Biland
- Passenger: (United Kingdom) Kenny Williams
- Time: 1:29.600
Podium
- First rider: (Switzerland) Rolf Biland
- First passenger: (United Kingdom) Kenny Williams
- Second rider: (France) Alain Michel
- Second passenger: (United Kingdom) Stu Collins
- Third rider: (United Kingdom) Mac Hobson
- Third passenger: (United Kingdom) Ken Birch

The 1978 French motorcycle Grand Prix was the fourth round of the 1978 Grand Prix motorcycle racing season. It took place on the weekend of 5–7 May 1978 at the Circuit de Nogaro.

== Classification ==
=== 500 cc ===
Pos.	No.	Rider	Team	Manufacturer	Time/Retired	Points
1	1	(United States) Kenny Roberts	Yamaha Motor Company	Yamaha	56'42.500	15
2	3	(United States) Pat Hennen	Texaco Heron Team Suzuki	Suzuki	+10.500	12
3	7	(United Kingdom) Barry Sheene	Texaco Heron Team Suzuki	Suzuki	+29.700	10
4	2	(France) Christian Estrosi		Suzuki	+37.200	8
5	9	(Netherlands) Wil Hartog	Riemersma Racing	Suzuki	+1'07.300	6
6	31	(Italy) Graziano Rossi	Team Gallina Nava Olio Fiat	Suzuki	+1 lap	5
7	5	(United Kingdom) Steve Parrish		Suzuki	+1 lap	4
8	23	(Belgium) Jean-Philippe Orban	Team La Licorne	Suzuki	+1 lap	3
9	48	(Italy) Carlo Perugini		Suzuki	+2 laps	2
10	52	(Australia) Kenny Blake		Yamaha	+2 laps	1
11	43	(United Kingdom) Alex George		Suzuki	+2 laps	
12	51	(France) Marc Chabert		Yamaha	+2 laps	
13	15	(New Zealand) John Woodley	Sid Griffiths Racing	Suzuki	+2 laps	
14	37	(West Germany) Franz Rau	Kazenmaier Autovermietung	Suzuki	+3 laps	
15	25	(Denmark) Børge Nielsen		Suzuki	+3 laps	
16	38	(West Germany) Gerhard Vogt		Suzuki	+3 laps	
17	18	(Italy) Virginio Ferrari	Team Gallina Nava Olio Fiat	Suzuki	+4 laps	
18	11	(United Kingdom) John Newbold	Ray Hamblin Motorcycles	Suzuki	+4 laps	
19	26	(Finland) Kimmo Kopra		Yamaha	+4 laps	
20	16	(Switzerland) Philippe Coulon	Marlboro Nava Total	Suzuki	+7 laps	
21		(Netherlands) Boet van Dulmen		Suzuki	+11 laps	
22		(Italy) Gianfranco Bonera	Team Kiwi Yamoto	Suzuki	+12 laps	
23		(Venezuela) Johnny Cecotto	Yamaha Motor Company	Yamaha	+16 laps	
24		(France) Alain Beraud		Yamaha	+18 laps	
Ret		(France) Michel Rougerie		Suzuki	Retired	
Ret		(France) Pierre Tocco		Yamaha	Accident	
Ret		(France) Jean-Paul Boinet		Buton	Retired	
Ret		(South Africa) Leslie van Breda		Suzuki	Retired	
Ret		(United Kingdom) Eddie Roberts		Suzuki	Retired	
Ret		(Finland) Teuvo Länsivuori		Suzuki	Retired	
Ret		(West Germany) René Gutknecht		Suzuki	Retired	
Ret		(Switzerland) Bruno Kneubühler	RSS Racing Team	Suzuki	Retired	
Ret		(Australia) Jack Findlay		Suzuki	Retired	
Ret		(United Kingdom) Steve Wright	Len Manchester Motorcycles	Yamaha	Retired	
Ret		(Japan) Takazumi Katayama	Sarome & Motul Team	Yamaha	Accident	
Ret		(Italy) Marco Lucchinelli	Cagiva Corse	Suzuki	Clutch	
DNS		(Japan) Ikujiro Takai	Yamaha Motor Company	Yamaha	Did not start	
DNS		(Italy) Leandro Becheroni		Suzuki	Did not start	

=== 350cc ===
Pos	No.	Rider	Manufacturer	Laps	Time	Grid	Points
1	16	(Australia) Gregg Hansford	Kawasaki	36	51:29.2	3	15
2	5	(South Africa) Kork Ballington	Kawasaki	36	+7.8	2	12
3	3	(South Africa) Jon Ekerold	Yamaha	36	+46.8	12	10
4	2	(United Kingdom) Tom Herron	Yamaha	36	+54.3		8
5	31	(Australia) Vic Soussan	Yamaha	36	+1:09.1	8	6
6	1	(France) Patrick Fernandez	Yamaha	36	+1:11.3	5	5
7	6	(France) Olivier Chevallier	Yamaha	36	+1:18.3	1	4
8	29	(Finland) Pentti Korhonen	Yamaha	36	+1:23.8		3
9	41	(France) Raymond Roche	Yamaha	36	+1:24.5	4	2
10	4	(France) Michel Rougerie	Yamaha	35	+1 lap		1
11	10	(United Kingdom) Mick Grant	Kawasaki	35	+1 lap	11	
12	49	(United Kingdom) Clive Padgett	Yamaha	35	+1 lap		
13	19	(Japan) Sadao Asami	Yamaha	35	+1 lap		
14	21	(Italy) Franco Bonera	Yamaha	35	+1 lap		
15	11	(United Kingdom) Chas Mortimer	Yamaha	35	+1 lap		
16	34	(Switzerland) Michel Frutschi	Yamaha	35	+1 lap		
17	30	(Sweden) Leif Gustafsson	Yamaha	35	+1 lap		
18	40	(France) Denis Boulom	Yamaha	34	+2 laps		
19	24	(Finland) Eero Hyvärinen	Yamaha	33	+3 laps		
20	57	(France) Michel Rastel	Yamaha	33	+3 laps		
		(France) Guy Bertin	Yamaha			6	
		(France) Christian Sarron	Yamaha			7	
		(Australia) John Dodds	Yamaha			9	
		(Japan) Takazumi Katayama	Yamaha			10	
36 starters in total, 21 finishers

=== 250cc ===
Pos	No.	Rider	Manufacturer	Laps	Time	Grid	Points
1	25	(Australia) Gregg Hansford	Kawasaki	33	48:22.1	2	15
2	20	(United States) Kenny Roberts	Yamaha	33	+2.1	7	12
3	6	(South Africa) Kork Ballington	Kawasaki	33	+25.1	4	10
4	8	(South Africa) Jon Ekerold	Yamaha	33	+48.9		8
5	5	(United Kingdom) Tom Herron	Yamaha	33	+1:07.1		6
6	37	(France) Raymond Roche	Yamaha	33	+1:12.7	3	5
7	12	(United Kingdom) Chas Mortimer	Yamaha	33	+1:15.9	9	4
8	4	(France) Olivier Chevallier	Yamaha	33	+1:22.6	6	3
9	21	(Australia) Vic Soussan	Yamaha	33	+1:22.9	12	2
10	34	(France) Guy Bertin	Yamaha	33	+1:23.3	8	1
11	2	(Italy) Franco Uncini	Yamaha	33	+1:30.2	10	
12	48	(United Kingdom) Clive Padgett	Yamaha	32	+1 lap		
13	27	(France) Hervé Moineau	Yamaha	32	+1 lap		
14	39	(Japan) Sadao Asami	Yamaha	32	+1 lap		
15	16	(Sweden) Leif Gustafsson	Yamaha	32	+1 lap		
16	40	(France) Jean-Claude Meilland	Yamaha	32	+1 lap		
17	31	(Switzerland) Jacques Cornu	Yamaha	32	+1 lap		
18	46	(France) Pierre Tocco	Yamaha	32	+1 lap	11	
19	51	(Venezuela) Carlos Lavado	Yamaha	31	+2 laps		
20	22	(West Germany) Josef Hage	Yamaha	31	+2 laps		
		(France) Patrick Fernandez	Yamaha			1	
		(France) Jean-François Baldé	Kawasaki			5	
36 starters in total, 24 finishers

=== 125cc ===
Pos	No.	Rider	Manufacturer	Laps	Time	Grid	Points
1	1	(Italy) Pierpaolo Bianchi	Minarelli	32	50:21.3	2	15
2	2	(Italy) Eugenio Lazzarini	MBA	32	+12.5	3	12
3	33	(Sweden) Per-Edward Carlson	Morbidelli	32	+33.7	5	10
4	9	(Italy) Maurizio Massimiani	Morbidelli	32	+37.0	7	8
5	4	(France) Jean-Louis Guignabodet	Bender	32	+1:30.9	6	6
6	18	(France) Thierry Noblesse	Morbidelli	31	+1 lap	9	5
7	32	(Finland) Matti Kinnunen	Morbidelli	31	+1 lap	12	4
8	36	(France) Patrick Plisson	Morbidelli	31	+1 lap	8	3
9	6	(Austria) Harald Bartol	Morbidelli	31	+1 lap	11	2
10	48	(France) Daniel Meyer	Morbidelli	31	+1 lap		1
11	46	(France) Claude Gorry	Morbidelli	31	+1 lap		
12	7	(Switzerland) Stefan Dörflinger	Morbidelli	30	+2 laps	10	
13	27	(Netherlands) Bennie Wilbers	Morbidelli	30	+2 laps		
14	29	(Austria) Johann Parzer	Morbidelli	30	+2 laps		
15	28	(Austria) Ernst Fagerer	Morbidelli	30	+2 laps		
16	19	(Italy) Yves Dupont	Morbidelli	29	+3 laps		
17	45	(France) Jacques Hutteau	Morbidelli	29	+3 laps		
18	42	(Italy) Pierluigi Conforti	Morbidelli	27	+5 laps		
19	16	(West Germany) Bernd Schneider	Bender	27	+5 laps		
20	23	(Switzerland) Karl Fuchs	Morbidelli	22	+10 laps		
		(France) Thierry Espié	Motobécane			1	
		(Switzerland) Hans Müller	Morbidelli			4	
32 starters in total, 20 finishers

=== Sidecar classification ===
Pos	No.	Rider	Passenger	Manufacturer	Laps	Time	Grid	Points
1	2	(Switzerland) Rolf Biland	(United Kingdom) Kenny Williams	Beo-Yamaha	30	46:25.2	2	15
2	5	(France) Alain Michel	(United Kingdom) Stu Collins	Seymaz-Yamaha	30	+2.0	1	12
3	10	(United Kingdom) Mac Hobson	(United Kingdom) Ken Birch	Yamaha	30	+48.5	7	10
4	1	(United Kingdom) George O'Dell	(United Kingdom) Cliff Holland	Seymaz-Yamaha	30	+1:25.9		8
5	8	(Switzerland) Bruno Holzer	(Switzerland) Karl Meierhans	LCR-Yamaha	30	+1:25.4	8	6
6	3	(West Germany) Werner Schwärzel	(West Germany) Andreas Huber	Fath	29	+1 lap	6	5
7	19	(United Kingdom) Jock Taylor	(United Kingdom) Lewis Ward	Windle-Yamaha	29	+1 lap		4
8	6	(Sweden) Göte Brodin	(Sweden) Per-Erik Wickström	Yamaha	29	+1 lap		3
9	15	(United Kingdom) Bill Hodgkins	(United Kingdom) John Parkins	Windle-Yamaha	29	+1 lap		2
10	23	(Switzerland) Gérard Corbaz	(Switzerland) Roland Gabriel	Schmid-Yamaha	29	+1 lap		1
11	16	(United Kingdom) John Barker	(United Kingdom) Nick Cutmore	Yamaha	29	+1 lap		
12	36	(Switzerland) Ernst Trachsel	(Switzerland) Andreas Stager	TTM-Suzuki	29	+1 lap	9	
13	12	(West Germany) Siegfried Schauzu	(West Germany) Lorenzo Puzo	Busch-Yamaha	28	+2 laps		
14	30	(France) Bernard Chabert	(France) Patrick Jourdain	GEP-Yamaha	28	+2 laps		
15	33	(Switzerland) Jean-Claude Jaquet	(Switzerland) René Delarre	Yamaha	28	+2 laps		
		(Switzerland) Jean-François Monnin	(Switzerland) Philippe Miserez	Seymaz-Yamaha			3	
		(France) Yvan Troillet	(France) Pierre Muller	GEP-Yamaha			4	
		(West Germany) Rolf Steinhausen	(West Germany) Wolfgang Kalauch	Seymaz-Yamaha			5	
		(West Germany) Hermann Huber	(West Germany) Bernd Schappacher	König			10	
24 starters in total, 18 finishers

Previous race: 1978 Austrian Grand Prix	FIM Grand Prix World Championship; 1978 season	Next race: 1978 Nations Grand Prix
Previous race: 1977 French Grand Prix	French Grand Prix	Next race: 1979 French Grand Prix
