= 1979 French motorcycle Grand Prix =

(France) 1979 French Grand Prix
Race details
- Race 13 of 13 races in the 1979 Grand Prix motorcycle racing season
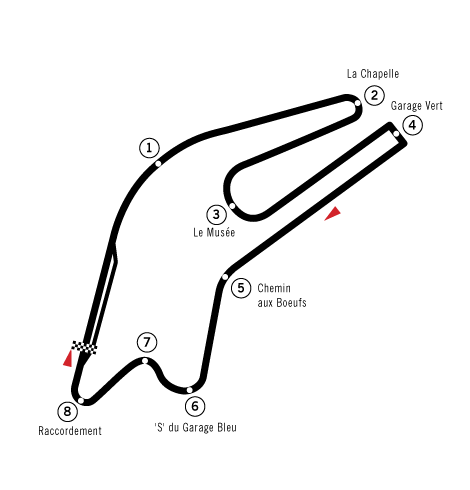
- Date: 2 September 1979
- Official name: Grand Prix de France
- Location: Bugatti Circuit
- Course: Permanent racing facility; 4.240 km (2.635 mi)

500cc
Pole position
- Rider: (United States) Kenny Roberts
- Time: 1:38.130
Fastest lap
- Rider: (Italy) Virginio Ferrari
- Time: 1:37.900
Podium
- First: (United Kingdom) Barry Sheene
- Second: (United States) Randy Mamola
- Third: (United States) Kenny Roberts

350cc
Pole position
- Rider: (South Africa) Kork Ballington
- Time: 1:40.750
Fastest lap
- Rider: (France) Éric Saul
Podium
- First: (France) Patrick Fernandez
- Second: (Switzerland) Roland Freymond
- Third: (Italy) Walter Villa

250cc
Pole position
- Rider: (Australia) Gregg Hansford
- Time: 1:43.530
Fastest lap
- Rider: (South Africa) Kork Ballington
- Time: 1:43.600
Podium
- First: (South Africa) Kork Ballington
- Second: (Australia) Gregg Hansford
- Third: (France) Patrick Fernandez

125cc
Pole position
- Rider: (France) Guy Bertin
- Time: 1:50.300
Fastest lap
- Rider: (Spain) Ángel Nieto
- Time: 1:49.700
Podium
- First: (France) Guy Bertin
- Second: (Spain) Ricardo Tormo
- Third: (Italy) Pier Paolo Bianchi

50cc
Pole position
- Rider: (Spain) Ricardo Tormo
- Time: 2:02.560
Fastest lap
- Rider: (Switzerland) Stefan Dörflinger
Podium
- First: (Italy) Eugenio Lazzarini
- Second: (Switzerland) Stefan Dörflinger
- Third: (Switzerland) Rolf Blatter

The 1979 French motorcycle Grand Prix was the last round of the 1979 Grand Prix motorcycle racing season. It took place on the weekend of 31 August–2 September 1979 at the Bugatti Circuit in Le Mans.

== Classification ==
=== 500 cc ===
Pos.	Rider	Team	Manufacturer	Time/Retired	Points
1	(United Kingdom) Barry Sheene	Texaco Heron Team Suzuki	Suzuki	48'06.800	15
2	(United States) Randy Mamola	Serge Zago	Suzuki	+2.400	12
3	(United States) Kenny Roberts	Yamaha Motor Company	Yamaha	+13.890	10
4	(Italy) Franco Uncini	Team Zago International	Suzuki	+19.710	8
5	(Venezuela) Johnny Cecotto	Yamaha Motor Company	Yamaha	+20.020	6
6	(Switzerland) Philippe Coulon		Suzuki	+20.660	5
7	(United Kingdom) Steve Parrish	Texaco Heron Team Suzuki	Suzuki	+56.320	4
8	(France) Michel Rougerie		Suzuki	+45.200	3
9	(New Zealand) John Woodley		Suzuki	+1 lap	2
10	(Sweden) Peter Sjöström	Ava MC Stockholm	Suzuki	+1 lap	1
11	(Finland) Seppo Rossi	Kouv MK	Suzuki	+1 lap	
12	(Netherlands) Henk de Vries	Team 77	Suzuki	+1 lap	
13	(France) Hervé Guilleux		Buton	+1 lap	
14	(Italy) Gianni Rolando	Scuderia Naldoni	Suzuki	+2 laps	
15	(Venezuela) Roberto Pietri		Suzuki	+2 laps	
16	(West Germany) Gerhard Vogt	Bill Smith Racing	Suzuki	+2 laps	
17	(Switzerland) Alain Rothlisberger		Suzuki	+3 laps	
18	(Netherlands) Wil Hartog	Riemersma Racing	Suzuki	+7 laps	
19	(Netherlands) Willem Zoet	Stimorol Racing	Suzuki	+7 laps	
20	(France) Michel Rastel	Dieter Braun Team	Suzuki	+8 laps	
Ret	(Italy) Virginio Ferrari	Team Gallina Nava Olio Fiat	Suzuki	Accident	
Ret	(Netherlands) Boet Van Dulmen		Suzuki	Accident	
Ret	(Italy) Graziano Rossi	Morbidelli	Morbidelli	Retired	
Ret	(Italy) Leandro Becheroni		Suzuki	Retired	
Ret	(Italy) Carlo Perugini		Suzuki	Retired	
Ret	(New Zealand) Dennis Ireland	Derry's Racing	Suzuki	Retired	
Ret	(Sweden) Lennart Backstrom		Suzuki	Retired	
Ret	(France) Franck Gross		Suzuki	Retired	
Ret	(West Germany) Josef Hage	Dieter Braun Team	Suzuki	Retired	
Ret	(Denmark) Borge Nielsen		Suzuki	Retired	
Ret	(Switzerland) Sergio Pellandini		Suzuki	Retired	
Ret	(Italy) Gianni Pelletier		Suzuki	Retired	
Ret	(West Germany) Gustav Reiner	Dieter Braun Team	Suzuki	Retired	
Ret	(France) Christian Sarron	Team Sonauto Gauloises	Yamaha	Retired	
Ret	(Austria) Max Wiener		Suzuki	Retired	
Ret	(Italy) Marco Lucchinelli		Suzuki	Retired	
DNQ	(United Kingdom) Mick Grant	Honda International Racing	Honda	Did not qualify	
DNQ	(Japan) Takazumi Katayama	Honda International Racing	Honda	Did not qualify	
DNQ	(Spain) Carlos Delgado		Suzuki	Did not qualify	
DNQ	(Australia) Kenny Blake		Yamaha	Did not qualify	
DNQ	(Sweden) Bo Granath		Yamaha	Did not qualify	
DNQ	(Hong Kong) King Wong Kwong	Honda International Racing	Honda	Did not qualify	

Previous race: 1979 Czechoslovak Grand Prix	FIM Grand Prix World Championship; 1979 season	Next race: 1980 Nations Grand Prix
Previous race: 1978 French Grand Prix	French Grand Prix	Next race: 1980 French Grand Prix
