= 1979 Spanish motorcycle Grand Prix =

(Spain) 1979 Spanish Grand Prix
Race details
- Race 5 of 13 races in the 1979 Grand Prix motorcycle racing season
- Date: 20 May 1979
- Official name: Gran Premio de España
- Location: Circuito Permanente del Jarama
- Course: Permanent racing facility; 3.404 km (2.115 mi)

500cc
Pole position
- Rider: (United States) Mike Baldwin
- Time: 1:34.400
Fastest lap
- Rider: (United States) Kenny Roberts
- Time: 1:33.900
Podium
- First: (United States) Kenny Roberts
- Second: (Netherlands) Wil Hartog
- Third: (United States) Mike Baldwin

350cc
Pole position
- Rider: (South Africa) Kork Ballington
- Time: 2:18.400
Fastest lap
- Rider: (Japan) Sadao Asami
Podium
- First: (South Africa) Kork Ballington
- Second: (Australia) Gregg Hansford
- Third: (Switzerland) Michel Frutschi

250cc
Pole position
- Rider: (Australia) Gregg Hansford
- Time: 1:37.000
Fastest lap
- Rider: (South Africa) Kork Ballington
- Time: 1:36.200
Podium
- First: (South Africa) Kork Ballington
- Second: (Australia) Gregg Hansford
- Third: (Italy) Graziano Rossi

125cc
Pole position
- Rider: (Spain) Ángel Nieto
- Time: 1:43.700
Fastest lap
- Rider: (Spain) Ángel Nieto
- Time: 1:42.000
Podium
- First: (Spain) Ángel Nieto
- Second: (France) Thierry Espié
- Third: (West Germany) Walter Koschine

50cc
Pole position
- Rider: (Italy) Eugenio Lazzarini
- Time: 1:52.200
Fastest lap
- Rider: (Italy) Eugenio Lazzarini
- Time: 1:52.600
Podium
- First: (Italy) Eugenio Lazzarini
- Second: (France) Patrick Plisson
- Third: (Switzerland) Rolf Blatter

The 1979 Spanish motorcycle Grand Prix was the fifth round of the 1979 Grand Prix motorcycle racing season. It took place on the weekend of 18–20 May 1979 at the Circuito Permanente del Jarama.

== Classification ==
=== 500 cc ===
| Pos. | Rider | Team | Manufacturer | Time/Retired | Points |
|---|---|---|---|---|---|
| 1 | (United States) Kenny Roberts | Yamaha Motor Company | Yamaha | 57'10.900 | 15 |
| 2 | (Netherlands) Wil Hartog | Riemersma Racing | Suzuki | +13.900 | 12 |
| 3 | (United States) Mike Baldwin | Serge Zago | Suzuki | +19.900 | 10 |
| 4 | (Italy) Virginio Ferrari | Team Gallina Nava Olio Fiat | Suzuki | +42.700 | 8 |
| 5 | (Italy) Franco Uncini | Team Zago International | Suzuki | +49.900 | 6 |
| 6 | (Netherlands) Boet van Dulmen | | Suzuki | +54.000 | 5 |
| 7 | (Netherlands) Jack Middelburg | | Suzuki | +59.600 | 4 |
| 8 | (Switzerland) Philippe Coulon | | Suzuki | +1'04.900 | 3 |
| 9 | (France) Michel Rougerie | | Suzuki | +1'05.600 | 2 |
| 10 | (Italy) Marco Lucchinelli | | Suzuki | +1'06.400 | 1 |
| 11 | (United Kingdom) Steve Parrish | Texaco Heron Team Suzuki | Suzuki | +1 lap | |
| 12 | (Italy) Gianni Pelletier | | Suzuki | +1 lap | |
| 13 | (Netherlands) Henk de Vries | Team 77 | Suzuki | +2 laps | |
| 14 | (West Germany) Gerhard Vogt | Bill Smith Racing | Suzuki | +2 laps | |
| 15 | (Italy) Sergio Pellandini | | Suzuki | +2 laps | |
| 16 | (Austria) Max Nothiger | | Suzuki | +2 laps | |
| Ret | (Finland) Seppo Rossi | Kouv MK | Suzuki | Retired | |
| Ret | (Italy) Graziano Rossi | Morbidelli | Morbidelli | Retired | |
| Ret | (West Germany) Gustav Reiner | Dieter Braun Team | Suzuki | Accident | |
| Ret | (Sweden) Lennart Bäckström | Team Zago International | Suzuki | Retired | |
| Ret | (Italy) Lorenzo Ghiselli | | Suzuki | Retired | |
| Ret | (Austria) Kevin Stowe | | Suzuki | Retired | |
| Ret | (Japan) Hiroyuki Kawasaki | Texaco Heron Team Suzuki | Suzuki | Retired | |
| Ret | (United Kingdom) Barry Sheene | Texaco Heron Team Suzuki | Suzuki | Retired | |
| Ret | (Spain) Toni Garcia | | Suzuki | Retired | |
| Ret | (Sweden) Peter Sjöström | Ava MC Stockholm | Suzuki | Retired | |
| Ret | (France) Bernard Fau | Suzuki France | Suzuki | Accident | |
| DNS | (United Kingdom) Tom Herron | Texaco Heron Team Suzuki | Suzuki | Did not start | |
| DNQ | (France) Christian Sarron | Team Sonauto Gauloises | Yamaha | Did not qualify | |

| Previous race: 1979 Nations Grand Prix | FIM Grand Prix World Championship; 1979 season | Next race: 1979 Yugoslavian Grand Prix |
| Previous race: 1978 Spanish Grand Prix | Spanish Grand Prix | Next race: 1980 Spanish Grand Prix |
