= 1979 Nations motorcycle Grand Prix =

(Italy) 1979 Nations Grand Prix
Race details
- Race 4 of 13 races in the 1979 Grand Prix motorcycle racing season
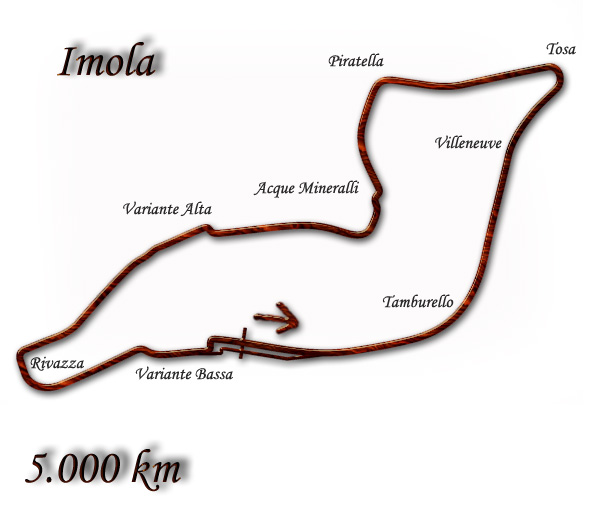
- Date: 13 May 1979
- Official name: Gran Premio delle Nazioni
- Location: Autodromo Dino Ferrari
- Course: Permanent racing facility; 5.060 km (3.144 mi)

500cc
Pole position
- Rider: (United Kingdom) Barry Sheene
- Time: 1:56.130
Fastest lap
- Rider: (United States) Kenny Roberts
- Time: 1:56.000
Podium
- First: (United States) Kenny Roberts
- Second: (Italy) Virginio Ferrari
- Third: (United Kingdom) Tom Herron

350cc
Pole position
- Rider: (South Africa) Kork Ballington
- Time: 1:59.020
Fastest lap
- Rider: (South Africa) Kork Ballington
- Time: 1:59.300
Podium
- First: (Australia) Gregg Hansford
- Second: (Japan) Sadao Asami
- Third: (France) Patrick Fernandez

250cc
Pole position
- Rider: (South Africa) Kork Ballington
- Time: 2:02.330
Fastest lap
- Rider: (South Africa) Kork Ballington
- Time: 2:01.400
Podium
- First: (South Africa) Kork Ballington
- Second: (United States) Randy Mamola
- Third: (United Kingdom) Barry Ditchburn

125cc
Pole position
- Rider: (Spain) Ángel Nieto
- Time: 2:09.450
Fastest lap
- Rider: (France) Thierry Espié
- Time: 2:08.500
Podium
- First: (Spain) Ángel Nieto
- Second: (France) Thierry Espié
- Third: (Italy) Maurizio Massimiani

50cc
Pole position
- Rider: (Italy) Eugenio Lazzarini
- Time: 2:22.940
Fastest lap
- Rider: (Italy) Eugenio Lazzarini
- Time: 2:24.500
Podium
- First: (Italy) Eugenio Lazzarini
- Second: (Switzerland) Rolf Blatter
- Third: (Netherlands) Peter Looijesteijn

The 1979 Nations motorcycle Grand Prix was the fourth round of the 1979 Grand Prix motorcycle racing season. It took place on the weekend of 11–13 May 1979 at the Autodromo Dino Ferrari.

== Classification ==
=== 500 cc ===
Pos.	Rider	Team	Manufacturer	Time/Retired	Points
1	(United States) Kenny Roberts	Yamaha Motor Company	Yamaha	56'49.700	15
2	(Italy) Virginio Ferrari	Team Gallina Nava Olio Fiat	Suzuki	+10.900	12
3	(United Kingdom) Tom Herron	Texaco Heron Team Suzuki	Yamaha	+17.400	10
4	(United Kingdom) Barry Sheene	Texaco Heron Team Suzuki	Suzuki	+31.900	8
5	(United States) Mike Baldwin	Serge Zago	Suzuki	+40.600	6
6	(France) Bernard Fau	Suzuki France	Suzuki	+51.000	5
7	(Netherlands) Jack Middelburg		Suzuki	+55.000	4
8	(Switzerland) Philippe Coulon		Suzuki	+1'01.000	3
9	(Italy) Graziano Rossi	Morbidelli	Morbidelli	+1'39.700	2
10	(Italy) Gianni Pelletier		Suzuki	+1 lap	1
11	(United Kingdom) Steve Parrish	Texaco Heron Team Suzuki	Yamaha	+1 lap	
12	(Austria) Max Wiener		Suzuki	+1 lap	
13	(United Kingdom) Alex George		Suzuki	+1 lap	
14	(Austria) Werner Nenning	Mobel Nenning Racing Team	Suzuki	+1 lap	
15	(Finland) Seppo Rossi	Kouv MK	Suzuki	+1 lap	
16	(Italy) Raffaele Pasqual		Suzuki	+1 lap	
17	(Italy) Sergio Pellandini		Suzuki	+2 laps	
Ret	(France) Christian Sarron	Team Sonauto Gauloises	Yamaha	Retired	
Ret	(Italy) Leandro Becheroni		Yamaha	Retired	
Ret	(Italy) Franco Uncini	Team Zago International	Suzuki	Retired	
Ret	(Netherlands) Boet van Dulmen		Suzuki	Retired	
Ret	(Netherlands) Wil Hartog	Riemersma Racing	Suzuki	Accident	
Ret	(Italy) Carlo Perugini		Suzuki	Accident	
Ret	(Italy) Lorenzo Ghiselli		Suzuki	Retired	
Ret	(Italy) Marco Lucchinelli		Suzuki	Retired	
Ret	(New Zealand) Dennis Ireland	Derry's Racing	Suzuki	Retired	
Ret	(South Africa) Eddie Grant		Suzuki	Retitred	
Ret	(France) Michel Rougerie		Suzuki	Retired	
Ret	(Italy) Gianni Rolando	Scuderia Naldoni	Suzuki	Accident	
Ret	(France) Carlo Paganini		Suzuki	Retired	
DNS	(Japan) Hiroyuki Kawasaki	Texaco Heron Team Suzuki	Suzuki	Did not start	
DNQ	(Italy) Gregorio Mariani		Suzuki	Did not qualify	
DNQ	(Sweden) Peter Sjöström	Ava MC Stockholm	Suzuki	Did not qualify	
DNQ	(West Germany) Jurgen Steiner	Suzuki Deutschland	Suzuki	Did not qualify	
DNQ	(Italy) Sandro Moro		Suzuki	Did not qualify	
DNQ	(Italy) Corrado Tuzii		Suzuki	Did not qualify	

Previous race: 1979 German Grand Prix	FIM Grand Prix World Championship; 1979 season	Next race: 1979 Spanish Grand Prix
Previous race: 1978 Nations Grand Prix	Italian Grand Prix	Next race: 1980 Nations Grand Prix
