= 1982 Dutch TT =

(Netherlands) 1982 Dutch TT
Race details
- Race 6 of 14 races in the 1982 Grand Prix motorcycle racing season
- Date: 26 June 1982
- Official name: Dutch TT Assen
- Location: TT Circuit Assen
- Course: Permanent racing facility; 7.685 km (4.775 mi)

500cc
Pole position
- Rider: (United States) Kenny Roberts
- Time: 2:49.870
Fastest lap
- Rider: Unknown
Podium
- First: (Italy) Franco Uncini
- Second: (United States) Kenny Roberts
- Third: (United Kingdom) Barry Sheene

350cc
Pole position
- Rider: (France) Jean-François Baldé
- Time: 2:58.450
Fastest lap
- Rider: Unknown
Podium
- First: (France) Jean-François Baldé
- Second: (West Germany) Anton Mang
- Third: (South Africa) Alan North

250cc
Pole position
- Rider: (Belgium) Didier de Radiguès
- Time: 3:01.890
Fastest lap
- Rider: Unknown
Podium
- First: (West Germany) Anton Mang
- Second: (France) Jean-Louis Tournadre
- Third: (Australia) Jeff Sayle

125cc
Pole position
- Rider: (Italy) Eugenio Lazzarini
- Time: 3:10.330
Fastest lap
- Rider: Unknown
Podium
- First: (Spain) Ángel Nieto
- Second: (Italy) Eugenio Lazzarini
- Third: (Italy) Pierluigi Aldrovandi

50cc
Pole position
- Rider: (Switzerland) Stefan Dörflinger
- Time: 3:30.720
Fastest lap
- Rider: Unknown
Podium
- First: (Switzerland) Stefan Dörflinger
- Second: (Italy) Eugenio Lazzarini
- Third: (Spain) Ricardo Tormo

The 1982 Dutch TT was the sixth round of the 1982 Grand Prix motorcycle racing season. It took place on the weekend of 25–26 June 1982 at the TT Circuit Assen located in Assen, Netherlands.

== Classification ==
=== 500 cc ===
Pos.	Rider	Team	Manufacturer	Time/Retired	Points
1	(Italy) Franco Uncini	Gallina Team Suzuki	Suzuki	46'38.100	15
2	(United States) Kenny Roberts	Yamaha Motor Company	Yamaha	+5.550	12
3	(United Kingdom) Barry Sheene	Yamaha Motor Company	Yamaha	+13.570	10
4	(New Zealand) Graeme Crosby	Marlboro Team Agostini	Yamaha	+17.940	8
5	(United States) Randy Mamola	Team HB Suzuki	Suzuki	+31.900	6
6	(Netherlands) Boet van Dulmen		Yamaha	+32.610	5
7	(South Africa) Kork Ballington	Team Kawasaki	Kawasaki	+37.370	4
8	(Japan) Takazumi Katayama	Honda International Racing	Honda	+42.330	3
9	(France) Marc Fontan	Team Sonauto Gauloises	Yamaha		2
10	(France) Raymond Roche		Suzuki		1
11	(Switzerland) Sergio Pellandini		Suzuki		
12	(United Kingdom) Ron Haslam		Honda		
13	(Italy) Graziano Rossi	Marlboro Team Agostini	Yamaha		
14	(United Kingdom) Steve Parrish	Team Mitsui Yamaha	Yamaha		
15	(New Zealand) Stuart Avant	Guan Hoe Suzuki	Suzuki		
16	(Switzerland) Andreas Hofmann		Suzuki		
17	(Finland) Seppo Rossi		Suzuki		
18	(Italy) Loris Reggiani	Gallina Team Suzuki	Suzuki		
19	(Switzerland) Michel Frutschi	Moto Sanvenero	Sanvenero		
20	(West Germany) Reinhold Roth	Wolfgang Kucera	Suzuki		
21	(Spain) Víctor Palomo		Suzuki		
22	(France) Guy Bertin	Moto Sanvenero	Sanvenero		
23	(Japan) Hiroyuki Kawasaki	Team HB Suzuki	Suzuki		
24	(United Kingdom) Chris Guy	Sid Griffiths Racing	Suzuki		
25	(Netherlands) Henk de Vries	Henk de Vries Motoren	Suzuki		
26	(Sweden) Peter Sjöström		Suzuki		
27	(Italy) Leandro Becheroni		Suzuki		
28	(Netherlands) Peter Looijesteijn	Dr Egel Banden	Suzuki		
29	(Netherlands) Rinus van Kasteren		Suzuki		
Ret	(Italy) Marco Lucchinelli	Honda International Racing	Honda	Retired	
Ret	(United States) Freddie Spencer	Honda International Racing	Honda	Retired	
Ret	(Switzerland) Philippe Coulon	Coulon Marlboro Tissot	Suzuki	Retired	
Ret	(Italy) Virginio Ferrari	Team HB Suzuki	Suzuki	Retired	
Ret	(Italy) Lorenzo Ghiselli		Suzuki	Retired	
Ret	(South Africa) Jon Ekerold		Suzuki	Retired	
Ret	(Netherlands) Jack Middelburg	Ergon Suzuki Racing	Suzuki	Retired	
DNS	(Italy) Guido Paci	Team MDS Belgarda	Yamaha	Did not start	
DNQ	(Italy) Gianni Pelletier		Morbidelli	Did not qualify	
DNQ	(France) Philippe Robinet		Yamaha	Did not qualify	
DNQ	(United Kingdom) Keith Huewen	Heron Team Suzuki	Suzuki	Did not qualify	
DNQ	(Denmark) Børge Nielsen		Suzuki	Did not qualify	
DNQ	(Netherlands) Johan van Eijk		Suzuki	Did not qualify	
DNQ	(Netherlands) Dick Alblas	Hollande Isolatie	Suzuki	Did not qualify	
DNQ	(Italy) Walter Migliorati		Suzuki	Did not qualify	

Previous race: 1982 Nations Grand Prix	FIM Grand Prix World Championship; 1982 season	Next race: 1982 Belgian Grand Prix
Previous race: 1981 Dutch TT	Dutch TT	Next race: 1983 Dutch TT
