= 1982 Austrian motorcycle Grand Prix =

(Austria) 1982 Austrian Grand Prix
Race details
- Race 2 of 14 races in the 1982 Grand Prix motorcycle racing season
- Date: 2 May 1982
- Official name: Großer Preis von Österreich
- Location: Salzburgring
- Course: Permanent racing facility; 4.246 km (2.638 mi)

500cc
Pole position
- Rider: (New Zealand) Graeme Crosby
- Time: 1:25.490
Fastest lap
- Rider: (Italy) Marco Lucchinelli
- Time: 1:19.790
Podium
- First: (Italy) Franco Uncini
- Second: (United Kingdom) Barry Sheene
- Third: (United States) Kenny Roberts

350cc
Pole position
- Rider: (Belgium) Didier de Radiguès
- Time: 1:30.770
Fastest lap
- Rider: (West Germany) Anton Mang
- Time: 1:24.230
Podium
- First: (France) Éric Saul
- Second: (West Germany) Anton Mang
- Third: (France) Patrick Fernandez

250cc
Pole position
- Rider: No 250cc race was held
Fastest lap
- Rider: No 250cc race was held
Podium
- First: No 250cc race was held
- Second: No 250cc race was held
- Third: No 250cc race was held

125cc
Pole position
- Rider: (Switzerland) Hans Müller
- Time: 1:36.010
Fastest lap
- Rider: (Austria) August Auinger
- Time: 1:32.450
Podium
- First: (Spain) Ángel Nieto
- Second: (Austria) August Auinger
- Third: (Italy) Pier Paolo Bianchi

50cc
Pole position
- Rider: No 50cc was held
Fastest lap
- Rider: No 50cc was held
Podium
- First: No 50cc was held
- Second: No 50cc was held
- Third: No 50cc was held

The 1982 Austrian motorcycle Grand Prix was the second round of the 1982 Grand Prix motorcycle racing season. It took place on the weekend of 30 April–2 May 1982 at the Salzburgring.

== Classification ==
=== 500 cc ===
Pos.	Rider	Team	Manufacturer	Time/Retired	Points
1	(Italy) Franco Uncini	Gallina Team Suzuki	Suzuki	39'47.200	15
2	(United Kingdom) Barry Sheene	Yamaha Motor Company	Yamaha	+4.930	12
3	(United States) Kenny Roberts	Yamaha Motor Company	Yamaha	+18.620	10
4	(New Zealand) Graeme Crosby	Marlboro Team Agostini	Yamaha	+21.210	8
5	(Netherlands) Boet van Dulmen		Suzuki	+40.220	6
6	(Finland) Seppo Rossi		Suzuki	+1'10.860	5
7	(United States) Randy Mamola	Team HB Suzuki	Suzuki	+1'30.560	4
8	(Italy) Leandro Becheroni		Suzuki	+1 lap	3
9	(Japan) Takazumi Katayama	Honda International Racing	Honda	+1 lap	2
10	(Switzerland) Andreas Hofmann		Suzuki	+1 lap	1
11	(Italy) Guido Paci	Team MDS Belgarda	Yamaha	+1 lap	
12	(South Africa) Jon Ekerold		Suzuki	+1 lap	
13	(Switzerland) Philippe Coulon	Coulon Marlboro Tissot	Suzuki	+1 lap	
14	(Italy) Graziano Rossi	Marlboro Team Agostini	Yamaha	+1 lap	
15	(West Germany) Reinhold Roth	Wolfgang Kucera	Suzuki	+1 lap	
16	(United Kingdom) Steve Parrish	Team Mitsui Yamaha	Yamaha	+1 lap	
17	(Italy) Virginio Ferrari	Team HB Suzuki	Suzuki	+2 laps	
18	(Austria) Josef Ragginger		Suzuki	+2 laps	
19	(West Germany) Hans Steinhögl		Suzuki	+2 laps	
Ret	(Italy) Marco Lucchinelli	Honda International Racing	Honda	Retired	
Ret	(France) Bernard Fau	GPA Total	Suzuki	Retired	
Ret	(United Kingdom) Chris Guy	Sid Griffiths Racing	Suzuki	Retired	
Ret	(Italy) Gianni Pelletier		Morbidelli	Retired	
Ret	(Switzerland) Michel Frutschi	Moto Sanvenero	Sanvenero	Retired	
Ret	(New Zealand) Stuart Avant	Guan Hoe Suzuki	Suzuki	Retired	
Ret	(Italy) Loris Reggiani	Gallina Team Suzuki	Suzuki	Retired	
Ret	(West Germany) Gustav Reiner	Krauser MDS German Racing Team	Suzuki	Retired	
Ret	(Italy) Walter Migliorati		Suzuki	Retired	
Ret	(Sweden) Peter Sjöström		Suzuki	Retired	
Ret	(United States) Freddie Spencer	Honda International Racing	Honda	Retired	
Ret	(Italy) Marco Papa		Suzuki	Retired	
Ret	(Netherlands) Peter Looijesteijn	Dr Egel Banden	Suzuki	Retired	
Ret	(Austria) Fritz Kerschbaumer	Triumph Club Wien	Yamaha	Retired	
Ret	(Switzerland) Sergio Pellandini		Suzuki	Retired	
Ret	(Netherlands) Jack Middelburg	Ergon Suzuki Racing	Suzuki	Retired	
Ret	(South Africa) Kork Ballington	Team Kawasaki	Kawasaki	Retired	
Ret	(France) Marc Fontan	Team Sonauto Gauloises	Yamaha	Retired	
DNS	(United Kingdom) Keith Huewen	Heron Team Suzuki	Suzuki	Did not start	
DNS	(West Germany) Josef Hage		Suzuki	Did not start	
DNQ	(France) Guy Bertin	Moto Sanvenero	Sanvenero	Did not qualify	
DNQ	(Italy) Lorenzo Ghiselli		Suzuki	Did not qualify	

Previous race: 1982 Argentine Grand Prix	FIM Grand Prix World Championship; 1982 season	Next race: 1982 French Grand Prix
Previous race: 1981 Austrian Grand Prix	Austrian Grand Prix	Next race: 1983 Austrian Grand Prix
