= 1982 Nations motorcycle Grand Prix =

(Italy) 1982 Nations Grand Prix
Race details
- Race 5 of 14 races in the 1982 Grand Prix motorcycle racing season
- Date: 30 May 1982
- Official name: Gran Premio delle Nazioni
- Location: Circuito Internazionale Santa Monica
- Course: Permanent racing facility; 3.488 km (2.167 mi)

500cc
Pole position
- Rider: (Italy) Franco Uncini
- Time: 1:22.100
Fastest lap
- Rider: (United States) Freddie Spencer
- Time: 1:22.030
Podium
- First: (Italy) Franco Uncini
- Second: (United States) Freddie Spencer
- Third: (New Zealand) Graeme Crosby

350cc
Pole position
- Rider: (Belgium) Didier de Radiguès
- Time: 1:24.790
Fastest lap
- Rider: (Venezuela) Carlos Lavado
Podium
- First: (Belgium) Didier de Radiguès
- Second: (Venezuela) Carlos Lavado
- Third: (Italy) Massimo Matteoni

250cc
Pole position
- Rider: (Italy) Massimo Matteoni
- Time: 1:26.020
Fastest lap
- Rider: (West Germany) Anton Mang
- Time: 1:25.670
Podium
- First: (West Germany) Anton Mang
- Second: (Switzerland) Roland Freymond
- Third: (France) Jean-Louis Tournadre

125cc
Pole position
- Rider: (Italy) Pier Paolo Bianchi
- Time: 1:28.820
Fastest lap
- Rider: (Italy) Pier Paolo Bianchi
- Time: 1:28.380
Podium
- First: (Spain) Ángel Nieto
- Second: (Italy) Pier Paolo Bianchi
- Third: (Venezuela) Iván Palazzese

50cc
Pole position
- Rider: (Switzerland) Stefan Dörflinger
- Time: 1:37.610
Fastest lap
- Rider: (Switzerland) Stefan Dörflinger
Podium
- First: (Switzerland) Stefan Dörflinger
- Second: (Spain) Ricardo Tormo
- Third: (Italy) Claudio Lusuardi

The 1982 Nations motorcycle Grand Prix was the fifth race of the 1982 Grand Prix motorcycle racing season. It took place on the weekend of 28–30 May 1982 at the Circuito Internazionale Santa Monica.

== Classification ==
=== 500 cc ===
Pos.	Rider	Team	Manufacturer	Time/Retired	Points
1	(Italy) Franco Uncini	Gallina Team Suzuki	Suzuki	55'29.620	15
2	(United States) Freddie Spencer	Honda International Racing	Honda	+12.720	12
3	(New Zealand) Graeme Crosby	Marlboro Team Agostini	Yamaha	+28.870	10
4	(United States) Kenny Roberts	Yamaha Motor Company	Yamaha	+35.400	8
5	(Italy) Marco Lucchinelli	Honda International Racing	Honda	+48.560	6
6	(South Africa) Kork Ballington	Team Kawasaki	Kawasaki	+1'07.040	5
7	(Japan) Takazumi Katayama	Honda International Racing	Honda	+1'12.320	4
8	(Italy) Leandro Becheroni		Suzuki	+1'13.410	3
9	(France) Marc Fontan	Team Sonauto Gauloises	Yamaha	+1 lap	2
10	(Sweden) Peter Sjöström		Suzuki	+1 lap	1
11	(France) Raymond Roche		Suzuki	+1 lap	
12	(Switzerland) Philippe Coulon	Coulon Marlboro Tissot	Suzuki	+1 lap	
13	(France) Franck Gross		Suzuki	+1 lap	
14	(Italy) Fabio Biliotti		Suzuki	+1 lap	
15	(Italy) Lorenzo Ghiselli		Suzuki	+2 laps	
16	(Italy) Corrado Tuzii		Suzuki	+2 laps	
17	(Italy) Edoardo Elias		Yamaha	+2 laps	
18	(Spain) Víctor Palomo		Suzuki	+2 laps	
19	(Italy) Gianni Pelletier		Morbidelli	+2 laps	
20	(Italy) Raffaele Pasqual		Yamaha	+3 laps	
Ret	(United States) Randy Mamola	Team HB Suzuki	Suzuki	Retired	
Ret	(United Kingdom) Barry Sheene	Yamaha Motor Company	Yamaha	Retired	
Ret	(Switzerland) Andreas Hofmann		Suzuki	Retired	
Ret	(Italy) Guido del Piano		Suzuki	Retired	
Ret	(Italy) Guido Paci	Team MDS Belgarda	Yamaha	Retired	
Ret	(Switzerland) Michel Frutschi	Moto Sanvenero	Sanvenero	Retired	
Ret	(West Germany) Reinhold Roth	Wolfgang Kucera	Suzuki	Retired	
Ret	(Switzerland) Sergio Pellandini		Suzuki	Retired	
Ret	(Finland) Seppo Rossi		Suzuki	Retired	
DNS	(Italy) Graziano Rossi	Marlboro Team Agostini	Yamaha	Did not start	

Previous race: 1982 Spanish Grand Prix	FIM Grand Prix World Championship; 1982 season	Next race: 1982 Dutch TT
Previous race: 1981 Nations Grand Prix	Italian Grand Prix	Next race: 1983 Nations Grand Prix
