= Jean-Louis Tournadre =

French motorcycle racer

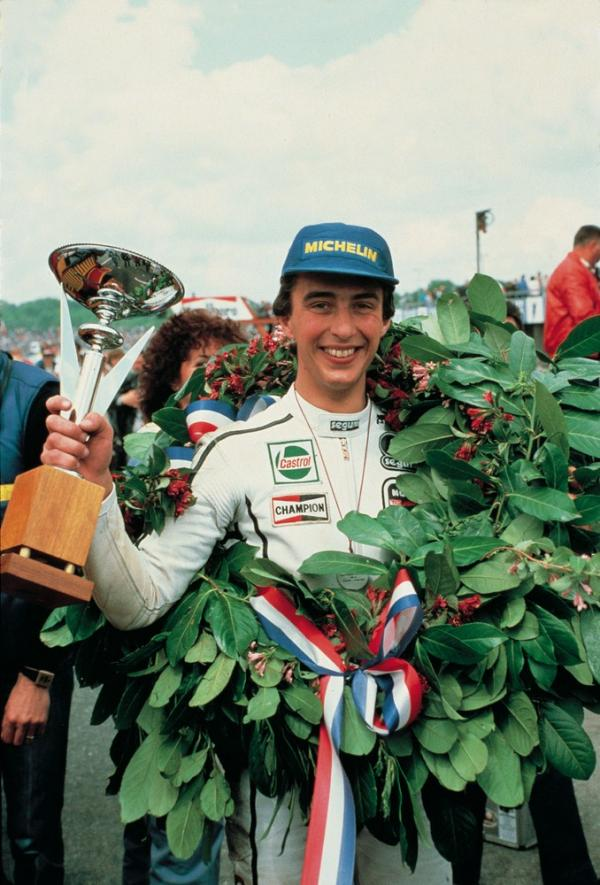
- Nationality: French
Motorcycle racing career statistics
Grand Prix motorcycle racing
Active years	1980 - 1986
First race	1980 350cc British Grand Prix
Last race	1986 250cc San Marino Grand Prix
First win	1982 250cc French Grand Prix
Last win	1982 250cc French Grand Prix
Championships	250cc - 1982
Starts / Wins / Podiums / Poles / F. laps / Points; 37 / 1 / 9 / 0 / 2 / 158

Jean-Louis Tournadre (born 17 November 1958) is a French former Grand Prix motorcycle road racer. Born in Clermont-Ferrand, he became France's first FIM road racing world champion when he clinched the 1982 250cc title aboard a Yamaha TZ250.

Despite only having one victory to his rival Anton Mang's five victories, Tournadre amassed enough podium results to win the championship by one point. His only victory came at the French Grand Prix held at Nogaro where most of the top riders, including Mang and Carlos Lavado, went on strike to protest the lack of safety at the circuit. In 1988, Tournadre competed in the Hockenheim round of the World Superbike Championship.

== Motorcycle Grand Prix Results ==
Points system from 1969 to 1987:

**Position**	1	2	3	4	5	6	7	8	9	10
**Points**	15	12	10	8	6	5	4	3	2	1

(key) (Races in bold indicate pole position; races in italics indicate fastest lap)

Year	Class	Team	1	2	3	4	5	6	7	8	9	10	11	12	Points	Rank	Wins
1980	250cc	Yamaha	NAT -	ESP -	FRA -	YUG -	NED -	BEL -	FIN -	GBR -	CZE; 10	GER -			1	32nd	0
1980	350cc	Rieju	NAT -		FRA -		NED -			GBR; 9	CZE -	GER; 8			5	20th	0
1981	250cc	Yamaha	ARG -	GER -	NAT -	FRA -	ESP -	NED -	BEL; 6	RSM; 6	GBR -	FIN; 4	SWE; 5	CZE; 3	34	7th	0
1982	250cc	Yamaha	FRA; 1	ESP; 2	NAT; 3	NED; 2	BEL; 6	YUG; 3	GBR; 3	SWE; 4	FIN; 7	CZE; 2	RSM; 2	GER; 4	118	**1st**	1
1983	250cc	Sonauto-Yamaha	RSA; NC	FRA; NC	NAT; NC	GER; 14	ESP; 11	AUT; NC	YUG; NC	NED -	BEL -	GBR; NC	SWE; NC		0	-	0
1986	250cc	Sonauto-Yamaha	ESP; NC	NAT; NC	GER; NC	AUT; NC	YUG; NC	NED -	BEL -	FRA -	GBR; NC	SWE; NC	RSM; 16		0	-	0
