= 1982 Yugoslavian motorcycle Grand Prix =

(Socialist Federal Republic of Yugoslavia) 1982 Yugoslavian Grand Prix
Race details
- Race 8 of 12 races in the 1982 Grand Prix motorcycle racing season
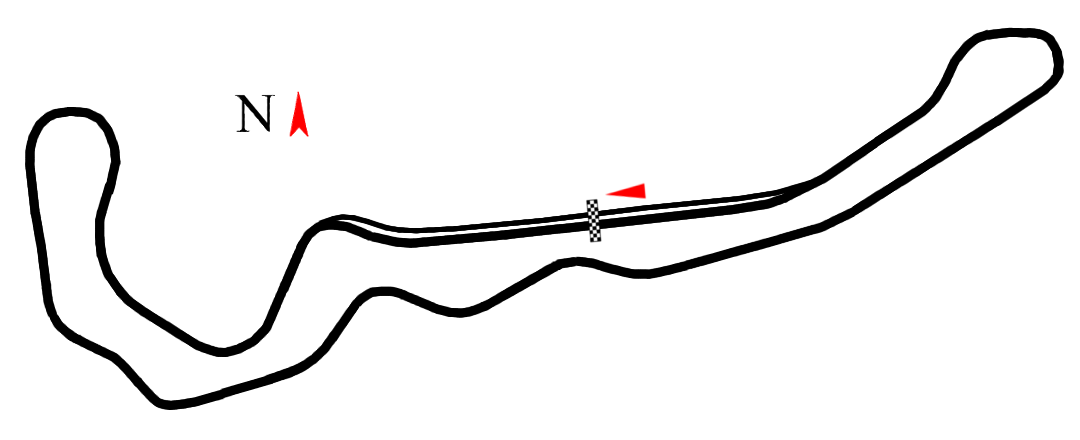
- Date: 18 July 1982
- Official name: Yu Grand Prix
- Location: Autodrom Rijeka
- Course: Permanent racing facility; 4.168 km (2.590 mi)

500cc
Pole position
- Rider: (United Kingdom) Barry Sheene
- Time: 1:33.080
Fastest lap
- Rider: (Italy) Franco Uncini
- Time: 1:33.700
Podium
- First: (Italy) Franco Uncini
- Second: (New Zealand) Graeme Crosby
- Third: (United Kingdom) Barry Sheene

350cc
Pole position
- Rider: No 350cc race was held
Fastest lap
- Rider: No 350cc race was held
Podium
- First: No 350cc race was held
- Second: No 350cc race was held
- Third: No 350cc race was held

250cc
Pole position
- Rider: (Belgium) Didier de Radiguès
- Time: 1:38.320
Fastest lap
- Rider: (France) Jean-Louis Tournadre
- Time: 1:38.190
Podium
- First: (Belgium) Didier de Radiguès
- Second: (Italy) Paolo Ferretti
- Third: (France) Jean-Louis Tournadre

125cc
Pole position
- Rider: (Italy) Eugenio Lazzarini
- Time: 1:39.500
Fastest lap
- Rider: (Italy) Eugenio Lazzarini
- Time: 1:40.500
Podium
- First: (Italy) Eugenio Lazzarini
- Second: (Italy) Pier Paolo Bianchi
- Third: (Spain) Ángel Nieto

50cc
Pole position
- Rider: (Switzerland) Stefan Dörflinger
- Time: 1:48.770
Fastest lap
- Rider: (Italy) Eugenio Lazzarini
Podium
- First: (Italy) Eugenio Lazzarini
- Second: (Switzerland) Stefan Dörflinger
- Third: (Spain) Ricardo Tormo

The 1982 Yugoslavian motorcycle Grand Prix was the eighth round of the 1982 Grand Prix motorcycle racing season. It took place on the weekend of 16–18 July 1982 at the Autodrom Rijeka.

== Classification ==
=== 500 cc ===
Pos.	Rider	Team	Manufacturer	Time/Retired	Points
1	(Italy) Franco Uncini	Gallina Team Suzuki	Suzuki	50'32.240	15
2	(New Zealand) Graeme Crosby	Marlboro Team Agostini	Yamaha	+9.770	12
3	(United Kingdom) Barry Sheene	Yamaha Motor Company	Yamaha	+12.900	10
4	(United States) Freddie Spencer	Honda Racing Corporation	Honda	+19.270	8
5	(Japan) Takazumi Katayama	Honda International Racing	Honda	+32.680	6
6	(Netherlands) Jack Middelburg	Ergon Suzuki Racing	Suzuki	+54.410	5
7	(United States) Randy Mamola	Team HB Suzuki	Suzuki	+1'05.760	4
8	(Italy) Marco Lucchinelli	Honda International Racing	Honda	+1'12.060	3
9	(Italy) Loris Reggiani	Gallina Team Suzuki	Suzuki	+1'18.880	2
10	(South Africa) Kork Ballington	Team Kawasaki	Kawasaki	+1'19.030	1
11	(Netherlands) Boet van Dulmen		Suzuki	+1'20.940	
12	(Japan) Hiroyuki Kawasaki	Team HB Suzuki	Suzuki	+1 lap	
13	(West Germany) Reinhold Roth	Wolfgang Kucera	Suzuki	+1 lap	
14	(Switzerland) Philippe Coulon	Coulon Marlboro Tissot	Suzuki	+1 lap	
15	(Finland) Seppo Rossi		Suzuki	+1 lap	
16	(Italy) Virginio Ferrari	Team HB Suzuki	Suzuki	+1 lap	
17	(France) Franck Gross		Suzuki	+1 lap	
18	(Italy) Guido Paci	Team MDS Belgarda	Yamaha	+1 lap	
19	(Sweden) Peter Sjöström		Suzuki	+1 lap	
20	(Italy) Fabio Biliotti		Suzuki	+1 lap	
21	(Italy) Leandro Becheroni		Suzuki	+1 lap	
22	(United Kingdom) Steve Parrish	Team Mitsui Yamaha	Yamaha	+1 lap	
23	(Switzerland) Sergio Pellandini		Suzuki	+1 lap	
24	(Norway) Bengt Slydal		Suzuki	+1 lap	
25	(Netherlands) Peter Looijesteijn	Dr Egel Banden	Suzuki	+1 lap	
26	(Switzerland) Wolfgang von Muralt		Suzuki	+1 lap	
27	(Switzerland) Alain Rothlisberger		Yamaha	+1 lap	
28	(Italy) Graziano Rossi	Marlboro Team Agostini	Yamaha	+1 lap	
29	(Italy) Raffaele Pasqual		Yamaha	+1 lap	
Ret	(Switzerland) Michel Frutschi	Moto Sanvenero	Sanvenero	Retired	
Ret	(United States) Kenny Roberts	Yamaha Motor Company	Yamaha	Retired	
Ret	(France) Marc Fontan	Team Sonauto Gauloises	Yamaha	Retired	
Ret	(United Kingdom) Chris Guy	Sid Griffiths Racing	Suzuki	Retired	
Ret	(France) Guy Bertin	Moto Sanvenero	Sanvenero	Retired	
Ret	(South Africa) Jon Ekerold		Suzuki	Retired	
DNS	(Spain) Víctor Palomo		Suzuki	Did not start	
DNS	(West Germany) Gustav Reiner	Krauser MDS German Racing Team	Suzuki	Did not start	
DNS	(Switzerland) Peter Huber		Suzuki	Did not start	

Previous race: 1982 Belgian Grand Prix	FIM Grand Prix World Championship; 1982 season	Next race: 1982 British Grand Prix
Previous race: 1981 Yugoslavian Grand Prix	Yugoslavian Grand Prix	Next race: 1983 Yugoslavian Grand Prix
