= 1982 Spanish motorcycle Grand Prix =

(Spain) 1982 Spanish Grand Prix
Race details
- Race 4 of 14 races in the 1982 Grand Prix motorcycle racing season
- Date: 23 May 1982
- Official name: Gran Premio Banco Atlántico
- Location: Circuito Permanente del Jarama
- Course: Permanent racing facility; 3.404 km (2.115 mi)

500cc
Pole position
- Rider: (United States) Freddie Spencer
- Time: 1:30.830
Fastest lap
- Rider: (United States) Kenny Roberts
- Time: 1:31.070
Podium
- First: (United States) Kenny Roberts
- Second: (United Kingdom) Barry Sheene
- Third: (Italy) Franco Uncini

350cc
Pole position
- Rider: No 350cc race was held
Fastest lap
- Rider: No 350cc race was held
Podium
- First: No 350cc race was held
- Second: No 350cc race was held
- Third: No 350cc race was held

250cc
Pole position
- Rider: (France) Jean-François Baldé
- Time: 1:34.150
Fastest lap
- Rider: (France) Jean-François Baldé
Podium
- First: (Venezuela) Carlos Lavado
- Second: (France) Jean-Louis Tournadre
- Third: (West Germany) Anton Mang

125cc
Pole position
- Rider: (Italy) Eugenio Lazzarini
- Time: 1:38.920
Fastest lap
- Rider: (Italy) Eugenio Lazzarini
- Time: 1:37.500
Podium
- First: (Spain) Ángel Nieto
- Second: (Italy) Eugenio Lazzarini
- Third: (Italy) Pierluigi Aldrovandi

50cc
Pole position
- Rider: (Switzerland) Stefan Dörflinger
- Time: 1:47.530
Fastest lap
- Rider: (Switzerland) Stefan Dörflinger
Podium
- First: (Switzerland) Stefan Dörflinger
- Second: (Italy) Eugenio Lazzarini
- Third: (Italy) Claudio Lusuardi

The 1982 Spanish motorcycle Grand Prix was the fourth round of the 1982 Grand Prix motorcycle racing season. It took place on the weekend of 21–23 May 1982 at the Circuito Permanente del Jarama.

== Classification ==
=== 500 cc ===
Pos.	Rider	Team	Manufacturer	Time/Retired	Points
1	(United States) Kenny Roberts	Yamaha Motor Company	Yamaha	57'08.040	15
2	(United Kingdom) Barry Sheene	Yamaha Motor Company	Yamaha	+8.250	12
3	(Italy) Franco Uncini	Gallina Team Suzuki	Suzuki	+13.750	10
4	(New Zealand) Graeme Crosby	Marlboro Team Agostini	Yamaha	+45.540	8
5	(Italy) Marco Lucchinelli	Honda International Racing	Honda	+53.620	6
6	(Japan) Takazumi Katayama	Honda International Racing	Honda	+1'17.880	5
7	(France) Marc Fontan	Team Sonauto Gauloises	Yamaha	+1 lap	4
8	(Spain) Víctor Palomo		Suzuki	+1 lap	3
9	(South Africa) Kork Ballington	Team Kawasaki	Kawasaki	+1 lap	2
10	(Italy) Guido Paci	Team MDS Belgarda	Yamaha	+1 lap	1
11	(Italy) Lorenzo Ghiselli		Suzuki	+1 lap	
12	(Switzerland) Philippe Coulon	Coulon Marlboro Tissot	Suzuki	+1 lap	
13	(United Kingdom) Steve Parrish	Team Mitsui Yamaha	Yamaha	+1 lap	
14	(Sweden) Peter Sjöström		Suzuki	+1 lap	
15	(Norway) Bengt Slydal		Suzuki	+1 lap	
16	(France) Franck Gross		Suzuki	+2 laps	
17	(France) Jean Lafond		Fior-Suzuki	+2 laps	
18	(Spain) Carlos Morante		Suzuki	+2 laps	
19	(Brazil) Marco Greco		Suzuki	+2 laps	
Ret	(France) Bernard Fau	GPA Total	Suzuki	Retired	
Ret	(Finland) Seppo Rossi		Suzuki	Retired	
Ret	(Switzerland) Michel Frutschi	Moto Sanvenero	Sanvenero	Retired	
Ret	(Italy) Graziano Rossi	Marlboro Team Agostini	Yamaha	Retired	
Ret	(United States) Randy Mamola	Team HB Suzuki	Suzuki	Retired	
Ret	(Switzerland) Sergio Pellandini		Suzuki	Retired	
Ret	(United States) Freddie Spencer	Honda International Racing	Honda	Retired	
Ret	(Spain) Ángel Nieto		Honda	Retired	
Ret	(Italy) Marco Papa		Suzuki	Retired	
Ret	(France) Guy Bertin	Moto Sanvenero	Sanvenero	Retired	
Ret	(Netherlands) Jack Middelburg	Ergon Suzuki Racing	Suzuki	Retired	
DNS	(Italy) Loris Reggiani	Gallina Team Suzuki	Suzuki	Did not start	
DNQ	(Italy) Leandro Becheroni		Suzuki	Did not qualify	
DNQ	(France) Philippe Robinet		Suzuki	Did not qualify	

Previous race: 1982 French Grand Prix	FIM Grand Prix World Championship; 1982 season	Next race: 1982 Nations Grand Prix
Previous race: 1981 Spanish Grand Prix	Spanish Grand Prix	Next race: 1983 Spanish Grand Prix
