= 1982 Argentine motorcycle Grand Prix =

Motorcycle race

(Argentina) 1982 Argentinian Grand Prix
Race details
- Race 1 of 14 races in the 1982 Grand Prix motorcycle racing season
- Date: 28 March 1982
- Official name: Grand Prix de la Republica Argentina
- Location: Autódromo Municipal de la Ciudad de Buenos Aires
- Course: Permanent racing facility; 4.092 km (2.543 mi)

500cc
Pole position
- Rider: (United States) Kenny Roberts
- Time: 1:34.050
Fastest lap
- Rider: (United States) Kenny Roberts
- Time: 1:33.140
Podium
- First: (United States) Kenny Roberts
- Second: (United Kingdom) Barry Sheene
- Third: (United States) Freddie Spencer

350cc
Pole position
- Rider: (France) Jean-François Baldé
- Time: 1:37.570
Fastest lap
- Rider: (France) Jean-François Baldé
Podium
- First: (Venezuela) Carlos Lavado
- Second: (France) Jean-François Baldé
- Third: (Belgium) Didier de Radiguès

250cc
Pole position
- Rider: No 250cc race was held
Fastest lap
- Rider: No 250cc race was held
Podium
- First: No 250cc race was held
- Second: No 250cc race was held
- Third: No 250cc race was held

125cc
Pole position
- Rider: (Spain) Ángel Nieto
- Time: 1:43.830
Fastest lap
- Rider: (Spain) Ricardo Tormo
- Time: 1:43.190
Podium
- First: (Spain) Ángel Nieto
- Second: (Spain) Ricardo Tormo
- Third: (Argentina) Willy Pérez

50cc
Pole position
- Rider: No 50cc was held
Fastest lap
- Rider: No 50cc was held
Podium
- First: No 50cc was held
- Second: No 50cc was held
- Third: No 50cc was held

The 1982 Argentine motorcycle Grand Prix was the first round of the 1982 Grand Prix motorcycle racing season. It took place on the weekend of 27–29 March 1982 at the Autódromo Municipal de la Ciudad de Buenos Aires.

== Classification ==
=== 500 cc ===
Pos.	Rider	Team	Manufacturer	Time/Retired	Points
1	(United States) Kenny Roberts	Yamaha Motor Company	Yamaha	50'44.820	15
2	(United Kingdom) Barry Sheene	Yamaha Motor Company	Yamaha	+0.670	12
3	(United States) Freddie Spencer	Honda International Racing	Honda	+1.370	10
4	(Italy) Franco Uncini	Gallina Team Suzuki	Suzuki	+5.660	8
5	(Italy) Marco Lucchinelli	Honda International Racing	Honda	+12.630	6
6	(Japan) Takazumi Katayama	Honda International Racing	Honda	+45.560	5
7	(France) Marc Fontan	Team Sonauto Gauloises	Yamaha	+48.590	4
8	(South Africa) Kork Ballington	Team Kawasaki	Kawasaki	+55.800	3
9	(Netherlands) Jack Middelburg	Ergon Suzuki Racing	Suzuki	+1'21.060	2
10	(Italy) Loris Reggiani	Gallina Team Suzuki	Suzuki	+2'05.610	1
11	(Netherlands) Boet van Dulmen		Suzuki	+1 lap	
12	(France) Bernard Fau	GPA Total	Suzuki	+1 lap	
13	(Italy) Graziano Rossi	Marlboro Team Agostini	Yamaha	+1 lap	
14	(Venezuela) Roberto Pietri		Suzuki	+1 lap	
15	(Switzerland) Philippe Coulon	Coulon Marlboro Tissot	Suzuki	+1 lap	
16	(Switzerland) Michel Frutschi	Moto Sanvenero	Sanvenero	+1 lap	
17	(Switzerland) Sergio Pellandini		Suzuki	+1 lap	
18	(South Africa) Jon Ekerold		Suzuki	+1 lap	
19	(France) Guy Bertin	Moto Sanvenero	Sanvenero	+1 lap	
20	(Brazil) Marco Greco		Suzuki	+2 laps	
Ret	(Venezuela) Eduardo Alemán		Yamaha	Retired	
Ret	(Finland) Seppo Rossi		Suzuki	Retired	
Ret	(United States) Randy Mamola	Team HB Suzuki	Suzuki	Retired	
Ret	(West Germany) Anton Mang		Kawasaki	Retired	
Ret	(Italy) Virginio Ferrari	Team HB Suzuki	Suzuki	Retired	
Ret	(Italy) Gianni Pelletier		Morbidelli	Retired	
Ret	(New Zealand) Graeme Crosby	Marlboro Team Agostini	Yamaha	Retired	
DNS	(Italy) Vincenzo Cascino		Yamaha	Did not start	

Previous race: 1981 Czechoslovak Grand Prix	FIM Grand Prix World Championship; 1982 season	Next race: 1982 Austrian Grand Prix
Previous race: 1981 Argentine Grand Prix	Argentine Grand Prix	Next race: 1987 Argentine Grand Prix
