= 1982 British motorcycle Grand Prix =

British motorcycle Grand Prix

(United Kingdom) 1982 British Grand Prix
Race details
- Race 9 of 14 races in the 1982 Grand Prix motorcycle racing season
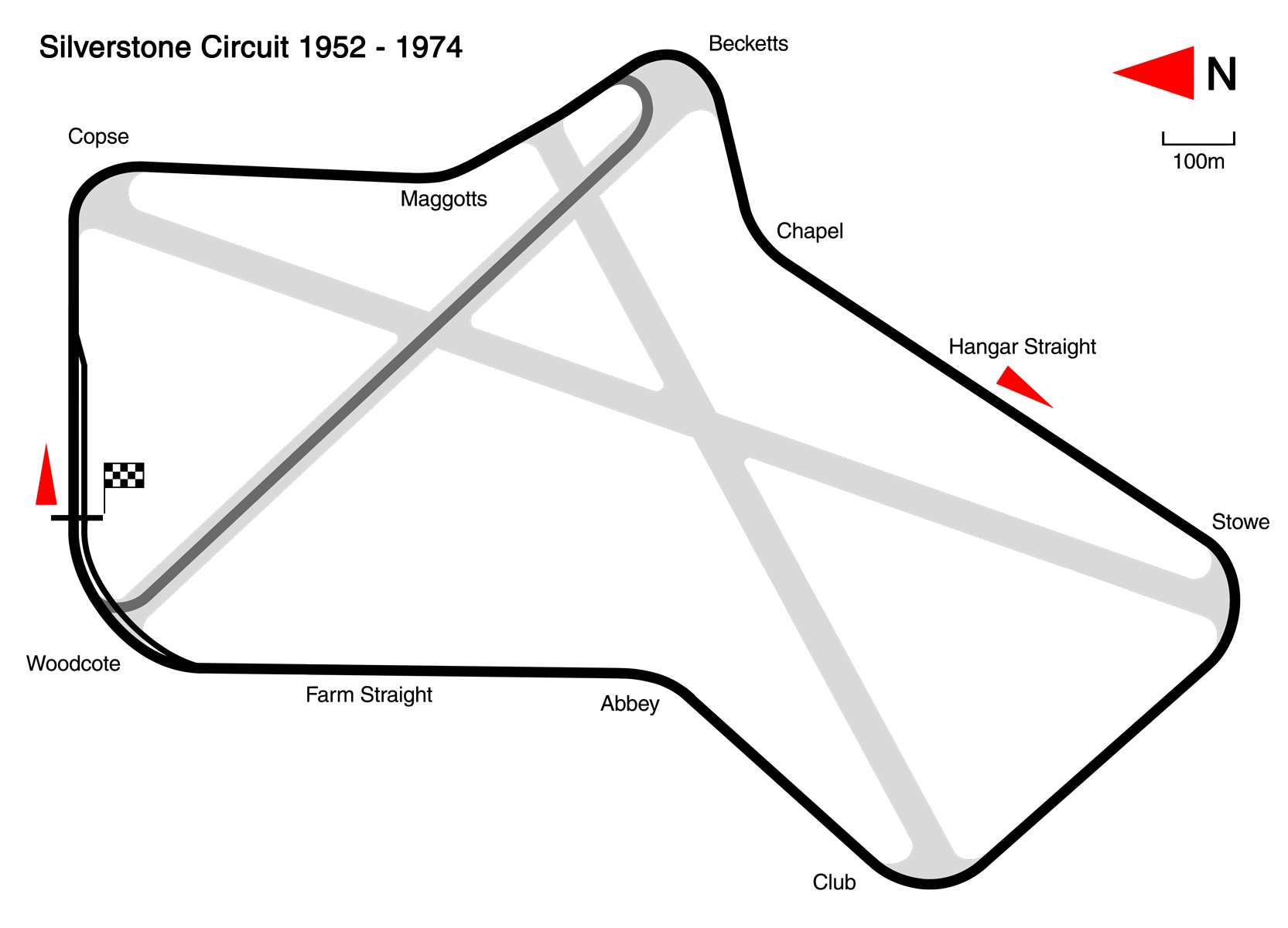
- Date: 1 August 1982
- Official name: Marlboro British Grand Prix
- Location: Silverstone Circuit
- Course: Permanent racing facility; 4.711 km (2.927 mi)

500cc
Pole position
- Rider: (United States) Kenny Roberts
- Time: 1:29.840
Fastest lap
- Rider: (New Zealand) Graeme Crosby
- Time: 1:30.500
Podium
- First: (Italy) Franco Uncini
- Second: (United States) Freddie Spencer
- Third: (New Zealand) Graeme Crosby

350cc
Pole position
- Rider: (West Germany) Martin Wimmer
- Time: 1:33.970
Fastest lap
- Rider: (France) Jean-François Baldé
- Time: 1:34.030
Podium
- First: (France) Jean-François Baldé
- Second: (Belgium) Didier de Radiguès
- Third: (West Germany) Anton Mang

250cc
Pole position
- Rider: (West Germany) Martin Wimmer
- Time: 1:35.400
Fastest lap
- Rider: (West Germany) Anton Mang
- Time: 1:35.300
Podium
- First: (West Germany) Martin Wimmer
- Second: (West Germany) Anton Mang
- Third: (France) Jean-Louis Tournadre

125cc
Pole position
- Rider: (Spain) Ángel Nieto
- Time: 1:39.040
Fastest lap
- Rider: (Spain) Ángel Nieto
- Time: 1:38.650
Podium
- First: (Spain) Ángel Nieto
- Second: (Spain) Ricardo Tormo
- Third: (Italy) Pier Paolo Bianchi

50cc
Pole position
- Rider: No 50cc race was held
Fastest lap
- Rider: No 50cc race was held
Podium
- First: No 50cc race was held
- Second: No 50cc race was held
- Third: No 50cc race was held

The 1982 British motorcycle Grand Prix was the ninth round of the 1982 Grand Prix motorcycle racing season. It took place on the weekend of 30–1 August 1982 at the Silverstone Circuit.

== Classification ==
=== 500 cc ===
| Pos. | Rider | Team | Manufacturer | Time/Retired | Points |
|---|---|---|---|---|---|
| 1 | (Italy) Franco Uncini | Gallina Team Suzuki | Suzuki | 42'49.640 | 15 |
| 2 | (United States) Freddie Spencer | Honda Racing Corporation | Honda | +6.430 | 12 |
| 3 | (New Zealand) Graeme Crosby | Marlboro Team Agostini | Yamaha | +13.740 | 10 |
| 4 | (Italy) Loris Reggiani | Gallina Team Suzuki | Suzuki | +15.180 | 8 |
| 5 | (United States) Randy Mamola | Team HB Suzuki | Suzuki | +15.400 | 6 |
| 6 | (Italy) Virginio Ferrari | Team HB Suzuki | Suzuki | +17.730 | 5 |
| 7 | (South Africa) Kork Ballington | Team Kawasaki | Kawasaki | +17.930 | 4 |
| 8 | (France) Marc Fontan | Team Sonauto Gauloises | Yamaha | +30.810 | 3 |
| 9 | (Italy) Leandro Becheroni | | Suzuki | +55.730 | 2 |
| 10 | (United Kingdom) Chris Guy | Sid Griffiths Racing | Suzuki | +1'04.190 | 1 |
| 11 | (Switzerland) Andreas Hofmann | | Suzuki | +1'04.190 | |
| 12 | (United Kingdom) Dave Dean | | Suzuki | +1'04.470 | |
| 13 | (South Africa) Jon Ekerold | | Suzuki | +1'05.140 | |
| 14 | (United Kingdom) Gary Lingham | | Suzuki | +1'05.890 | |
| 15 | (United Kingdom) Ron Haslam | | Honda | +1'06.510 | |
| 16 | (Japan) Isao Ishikawa | | Suzuki | +1'10.780 | |
| 17 | (Italy) Marco Lucchinelli | Honda International Racing | Honda | +1'13.200 | |
| 18 | (United Kingdom) Steve Parrish | Team Mitsui Yamaha | Yamaha | +1'13.200 | |
| 19 | (United Kingdom) Steve Henshaw | | Suzuki | +1'13.280 | |
| 20 | (Switzerland) Philippe Coulon | Coulon Marlboro Tissot | Suzuki | +1'13.890 | |
| 21 | (New Zealand) Stuart Avant | Guan Hoe Suzuki | Suzuki | +1'23.430 | |
| 22 | (United Kingdom) Norman Brown | | Suzuki | +1 lap | |
| 23 | (United Kingdom) Steve Williams | | Suzuki | +1 lap | |
| 24 | (Venezuela) Roberto Pietri | | Suzuki | +1 lap | |
| 25 | (United Kingdom) Bob Smith | | Yamaha | +1 lap | |
| 26 | (Italy) Guido Paci | | Yamaha | +1 lap | |
| 27 | (Italy) Fabio Biliotti | | Suzuki | +1 lap | |
| 28 | (United Kingdom) Mark Salle | | Suzuki | +2 laps | |
| Ret | (Japan) Takazumi Katayama | Honda International Racing | Honda | Retired | |
| Ret | (United Kingdom) Keith Huewen | Heron Team Suzuki | Suzuki | Retired | |
| Ret | (Finland) Seppo Rossi | | Suzuki | Retired | |
| Ret | (Switzerland) Sergio Pellandini | | Suzuki | Retired | |
| Ret | (United States) Kenny Roberts | Yamaha Motor Company | Yamaha | Retired | |
| Ret | (New Zealand) Dennis Ireland | | Suzuki | Retired | |
| Ret | (Italy) Graziano Rossi | Marlboro Team Agostini | Yamaha | Retired | |
| Ret | (United Kingdom) Graham Wood | | Yamaha | Retired | |
| Ret | (United Kingdom) Rob McElnea | | Suzuki | Retired | |
| Ret | (United Kingdom) Paul Iddon | | Suzuki | Retired | |
| Ret | (Italy) Marco Papa | | Suzuki | Retired | |
| Ret | (United Kingdom) Barry Woodland | | Suzuki | Retired | |
| DNS | (Sweden) Peter Sjöström | | Suzuki | Did not start | |
| DNS | (United Kingdom) Con Law | | Yamaha | Did not start | |
| DNS | (Netherlands) Boet van Dulmen | | Suzuki | Did not start | |
| DNS | (France) Franck Gross | | Suzuki | Did not start | |
| DNS | (United Kingdom) Clive Padgett | | Suzuki | Did not start | |
| DNQ | (Netherlands) Peter Looijesteijn | De Egel Banden | Suzuki | Did not qualify | |
| DNQ | (France) Philippe Robinet | | Yamaha | Did not qualify | |

| Previous race: 1982 Yugoslavian Grand Prix | FIM Grand Prix World Championship; 1982 season | Next race: 1982 Swedish Grand Prix |
| Previous race: 1981 British Grand Prix | British Grand Prix | Next race: 1983 British Grand Prix |
