= 1982 Belgian motorcycle Grand Prix =

(Belgium) 1982 Belgian Grand Prix
Race details
- Race 7 of 14 races in the 1982 Grand Prix motorcycle racing season
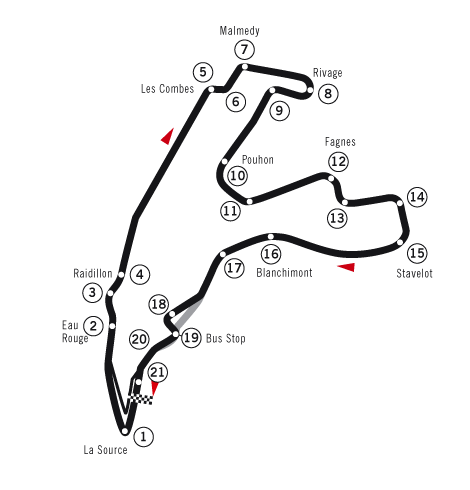
- Date: 4 July 1982
- Official name: Grand Prix of Belgium
- Location: Circuit de Spa-Francorchamps
- Course: Permanent racing facility; 6.940 km (4.312 mi)

500cc
Pole position
- Rider: (Netherlands) Jack Middelburg
- Time: 2:39.100
Fastest lap
- Rider: (United States) Freddie Spencer
- Time: 2:36.940
Podium
- First: (United States) Freddie Spencer
- Second: (United Kingdom) Barry Sheene
- Third: (Italy) Franco Uncini

350cc
Pole position
- Rider: No 350cc race was held
Fastest lap
- Rider: No 350cc race was held
Podium
- First: No 350cc race was held
- Second: No 350cc race was held
- Third: No 350cc race was held

250cc
Pole position
- Rider: (Switzerland) Jacques Cornu
- Time: 2:48.866
Fastest lap
- Rider: Unknown
Podium
- First: (West Germany) Anton Mang
- Second: (Australia) Graeme McGregor
- Third: (Belgium) Didier de Radiguès

125cc
Pole position
- Rider: (Spain) Ricardo Tormo
- Time: 2:56.628
Fastest lap
- Rider: Unknown
Podium
- First: (Spain) Ricardo Tormo
- Second: (Italy) Eugenio Lazzarini
- Third: (Italy) Pier Paolo Bianchi

50cc
Pole position
- Rider: No 50cc race was held
Fastest lap
- Rider: No 50cc race was held
Podium
- First: No 50cc race was held
- Second: No 50cc race was held
- Third: No 50cc race was held

The 1982 Belgian motorcycle Grand Prix was the seventh round of the 1982 Grand Prix motorcycle racing season. It took place on the weekend of 2–4 July 1982 at the Circuit de Spa-Francorchamps.

== Classification ==
=== 500 cc ===
Pos.	Rider	Team	Manufacturer	Time/Retired	Points
1	(United States) Freddie Spencer	Honda Racing Corporation	Honda	52'59.670	15
2	(United Kingdom) Barry Sheene	Yamaha Motor Company	Yamaha	+3.800	12
3	(Italy) Franco Uncini	Gallina Team Suzuki	Suzuki	+6.270	10
4	(United States) Kenny Roberts	Yamaha Motor Company	Yamaha	+23.080	8
5	(United States) Randy Mamola	Team HB Suzuki	Suzuki	+35.090	6
6	(Italy) Marco Lucchinelli	Honda International Racing	Honda	+36.470	5
7	(Netherlands) Boet van Dulmen		Suzuki	+39.540	4
8	(South Africa) Kork Ballington	Team Kawasaki	Kawasaki	+40.110	3
9	(Switzerland) Michel Frutschi	Moto Sanvenero	Sanvenero	+1'00.440	2
10	(France) Marc Fontan	Team Sonauto Gauloises	Yamaha	+1'02.770	1
11	(United Kingdom) Ron Haslam		Honda	+1'21.130	
12	(New Zealand) Stuart Avant	Guan Hoe Suzuki	Suzuki	+1'21.560	
13	(Finland) Seppo Rossi		Suzuki	+1'33.750	
14	(France) Guy Bertin	Moto Sanvenero	Sanvenero	+1'51.450	
15	(Switzerland) Philippe Coulon	Coulon Marlboro Tissot	Suzuki	+1'51.970	
16	(South Africa) Jon Ekerold		Suzuki	+1'58.780	
17	(Italy) Loris Reggiani	Gallina Team Suzuki	Suzuki	+2'07.010	
18	(Italy) Leandro Becheroni		Suzuki	+2'21.570	
19	(United Kingdom) Gary Lingham		Suzuki	+2'25.470	
20	(Italy) Fabio Biliotti		Suzuki	+1 lap	
21	(United Kingdom) Chris Guy	Sid Griffiths Racing	Suzuki	+1 lap	
Ret	(Japan) Hiroyuki Kawasaki	Team HB Suzuki	Suzuki	Retired	
Ret	(France) Franck Gross		Suzuki	Retired	
Ret	(Japan) Takazumi Katayama	Honda International Racing	Honda	Retired	
Ret	(France) Jean Lafond		Fior-Suzuki	Retired	
Ret	(United Kingdom) Steve Parrish	Team Mitsui Yamaha	Yamaha	Retired	
Ret	(Spain) Víctor Palomo		Suzuki	Retired	
Ret	(Switzerland) Sergio Pellandini		Suzuki	Retired	
Ret	(France) Raymond Roche		Suzuki	Retired	
Ret	(Italy) Graziano Rossi	Marlboro Team Agostini	Yamaha	Retired	
Ret	(Netherlands) Jack Middelburg	Ergon Suzuki Racing	Suzuki	Retired	
Ret	(West Germany) Gustav Reiner	Krauser MDS German Racing Team	Suzuki	Retired	
Ret	(Sweden) Peter Sjöström		Suzuki	Retired	
Ret	(New Zealand) Graeme Crosby	Marlboro Team Agostini	Yamaha	Retired	
Ret	(Switzerland) Peter Huber		Suzuki	Retired	
Ret	(Switzerland) Wolfgang von Muralt		Suzuki	Retired	

Previous race: 1982 Dutch TT	FIM Grand Prix World Championship; 1982 season	Next race: 1982 Yugoslavian Grand Prix
Previous race: 1981 Belgian Grand Prix	Belgian Grand Prix	Next race: 1983 Belgian Grand Prix
