= 1982 French motorcycle Grand Prix =

(France) 1982 French Grand Prix
Race details
- Race 3 of 14 races in the 1982 Grand Prix motorcycle racing season
- Date: 9 May 1982
- Official name: Grand Prix de France Moto
- Location: Circuit de Nogaro
- Course: Permanent racing facility; 3.636 km (2.259 mi)

500cc
Pole position
- Rider: (France) Jean Lafond
- Time: 1:24.830
Fastest lap
- Rider: (Switzerland) Michel Frutschi
- Time: 1:24.960
Podium
- First: (Switzerland) Michel Frutschi
- Second: (France) Franck Gross
- Third: (United Kingdom) Steve Parrish

350cc
Pole position
- Rider: (France) Patrick Igoa
- Time: 1:25.310
Fastest lap
- Rider: (Belgium) Didier de Radiguès
Podium
- First: (France) Jean-François Baldé
- Second: (Belgium) Didier de Radiguès
- Third: (Australia) Jeff Sayle

250cc
Pole position
- Rider: (France) Patrick Igoa
- Time: 1:25.310
Fastest lap
- Rider: (France) Jean-François Baldé
- Time: 1:25.000
Podium
- First: (France) Jean-Louis Tournadre
- Second: (France) Jean-François Baldé
- Third: (Australia) Jeff Sayle

125cc
Pole position
- Rider: (France) Jean-Claude Selini
- Time: 1:31.130
Fastest lap
- Rider: (France) Jean-Claude Selini
- Time: 1:30.060
Podium
- First: (France) Jean-Claude Selini
- Second: (Finland) Johnny Wickström
- Third: (Argentina) Hugo-Jorge Vignetti

50cc
Pole position
- Rider: No 50cc was held
Fastest lap
- Rider: No 50cc was held
Podium
- First: No 50cc was held
- Second: No 50cc was held
- Third: No 50cc was held

The 1982 French motorcycle Grand Prix was the third round of the 1982 Grand Prix motorcycle racing season. It took place on the weekend of 7–9 May 1982 at the Circuit de Nogaro.

The race was controversial, because the major factory teams (Yamaha, Honda and Suzuki), which included top riders like Kenny Roberts, Barry Sheene, Freddie Spencer, Franco Uncini and Takazumi Katayama, largely or completely boycotted the event due to the dangerous track conditions. Some private riders also boycotted the race, which led to the venue never reappearing on the calendar ever since.

Gina Bovaird, who took advantage of the major factory team's boycott to qualify for the race, remains the only female rider to ever start a race in the 500cc/MotoGP class.

== Classification ==
=== 500 cc ===
Pos.	Rider	Team	Manufacturer	Time/Retired	Points
1	(Switzerland) Michel Frutschi	Moto Sanvenero	Sanvenero	57'22.410	15
2	(France) Franck Gross		Suzuki	+9.130	12
3	(United Kingdom) Steve Parrish	Team Mitsui Yamaha	Yamaha	+14.640	10
4	(Switzerland) Sergio Pellandini		Suzuki	+17.810	8
5	(New Zealand) Stuart Avant	Guan Hoe Suzuki	Suzuki	+18.120	6
6	(Italy) Guido Paci	Team MDS Belgarda	Yamaha	+27.580	5
7	(France) Philippe Robinet		Yamaha	+33.930	4
8	(United Kingdom) Chris Guy	Sid Griffiths Racing	Suzuki	+37.620	3
9	(Switzerland) Andreas Hofmann		Suzuki	+51.600	2
10	(Switzerland) Philippe Coulon	Coulon Marlboro Tissot	Suzuki	+53.730	1
11	(Switzerland) Wolfgang von Muralt		Suzuki	+59.250	
12	(Italy) Lorenzo Ghiselli		Suzuki	+1'0.830	
13	(Sweden) Peter Sjöström		Suzuki	+1'10.550	
14	(Denmark) Børge Nielsen		Suzuki	+1'11.510	
15	(Italy) Gianni Pelletier		Morbidelli	+1 lap	
16	(Italy) Marco Papa		Suzuki	+1 lap	
17	(Brazil) Marco Greco		Suzuki	+2 laps	
18	(South Africa) Jon Ekerold		Suzuki	+2 laps	
Ret	(France) Bernard Fau	GPA Total	Suzuki	Retired	
Ret	(France) Jean Lafond		Fior-Suzuki	Retired	
Ret	(France) Raymond Roche		Suzuki	Retired	
Ret	(France) Guy Bertin	Moto Sanvenero	Sanvenero	Retired	
Ret	(Spain) Víctor Palomo		Suzuki	Retired	
Ret	(Switzerland) Christian le Liard		Suzuki	Retired	
Ret	(Italy) Leandro Becheroni		Suzuki	Retired	
Ret	(France) Louis-Luc Maisto		Suzuki	Retired	
Ret	(France) Maurice Coq		Suzuki	Retired	
Ret	(United States) Gina Bovaird		Suzuki	Retired	

Previous race: 1982 Austrian Grand Prix	FIM Grand Prix World Championship; 1982 season	Next race: 1982 Spanish Grand Prix
Previous race: 1981 French Grand Prix	French Grand Prix	Next race: 1983 French Grand Prix
