= 1982 Swedish motorcycle Grand Prix =

(Sweden) 1982 Swedish Grand Prix
Race details
- Race 10 of 14 races in the 1982 Grand Prix motorcycle racing season
- Date: 8 August 1982
- Official name: Swedish TT
- Location: Scandinavian Raceway
- Course: Permanent racing facility; 4.031 km (2.505 mi)

500cc
Pole position
- Rider: (United States) Freddie Spencer
- Time: 1:37.720
Fastest lap
- Rider: (United States) Randy Mamola
- Time: 1:38.370
Podium
- First: (Japan) Takazumi Katayama
- Second: (United States) Randy Mamola
- Third: (New Zealand) Graeme Crosby

350cc
Pole position
- Rider: No 350cc race was held
Fastest lap
- Rider: No 350cc race was held
Podium
- First: No 350cc race was held
- Second: No 350cc race was held
- Third: No 350cc race was held

250cc
Pole position
- Rider: (France) Christian Estrosi
- Time: 1:44.540
Fastest lap
- Rider: (Switzerland) Roland Freymond
- Time: 1:44.580
Podium
- First: (Switzerland) Roland Freymond
- Second: (West Germany) Anton Mang
- Third: (France) Jean-François Baldé

125cc
Pole position
- Rider: (Spain) Ricardo Tormo
- Time: 1:47.970
Fastest lap
- Rider: (Italy) Eugenio Lazzarini
- Time: 1:47.900
Podium
- First: (Venezuela) Iván Palazzese
- Second: (Italy) Eugenio Lazzarini
- Third: (Austria) August Auinger

50cc
Pole position
- Rider: No 50cc race was held
Fastest lap
- Rider: No 50cc race was held
Podium
- First: No 50cc race was held
- Second: No 50cc race was held
- Third: No 50cc race was held

The 1982 Swedish motorcycle Grand Prix was the tenth round of the 1982 Grand Prix motorcycle racing season. It took place on the weekend of 5–8 August 1982 at the Scandinavian Raceway in Anderstorp, Sweden.

== Classification ==
=== 500 cc ===
| Pos. | Rider | Team | Manufacturer | Time/Retired | Points |
|---|---|---|---|---|---|
| 1 | (Japan) Takazumi Katayama | Honda International Racing | Honda | 50'29.050 | 15 |
| 2 | (United States) Randy Mamola | Team HB Suzuki | Suzuki | +7.920 | 12 |
| 3 | (New Zealand) Graeme Crosby | Marlboro Team Agostini | Yamaha | +9.520 | 10 |
| 4 | (France) Marc Fontan | Team Sonauto Gauloises | Yamaha | +9.580 | 8 |
| 5 | (Italy) Marco Lucchinelli | Honda International Racing | Honda | +29.670 | 6 |
| 6 | (South Africa) Kork Ballington | Team Kawasaki | Kawasaki | +52.650 | 5 |
| 7 | (Netherlands) Boet van Dulmen | | Suzuki | +53.240 | 4 |
| 8 | (Switzerland) Philippe Coulon | Coulon Marlboro Tissot | Suzuki | +1'04.780 | 3 |
| 9 | (Switzerland) Sergio Pellandini | | Suzuki | +1'15.950 | 2 |
| 10 | (United Kingdom) Steve Parrish | Team Mitsui Yamaha | Yamaha | +1'27.780 | 1 |
| 11 | (Finland) Seppo Rossi | | Suzuki | +1'28.000 | |
| 12 | (Switzerland) Michel Frutschi | Moto Sanvenero | Sanvenero | +1'31.030 | |
| 13 | (Switzerland) Wolfgang von Muralt | | Suzuki | +1 lap | |
| 14 | (Switzerland) Andreas Hofmann | | Suzuki | +1 lap | |
| 15 | (United Kingdom) Chris Guy | Sid Griffiths Racing | Suzuki | +1 lap | |
| 16 | (Sweden) Peter Sjöström | | Suzuki | +1 lap | |
| 17 | (Sweden) Peter Sköld | | Suzuki | +1 lap | |
| 18 | (Denmark) Benny Mortensen | | Suzuki | +1 lap | |
| 19 | (France) Philippe Robinet | | Yamaha | +1 lap | |
| 20 | (Denmark) Kjeld Sørensen | | Suzuki | +1 lap | |
| 21 | (Finland) Esko Kuparinen | | Suzuki | +2 laps | |
| 22 | (Sweden) Cai Hedström | | Suzuki | +2 laps | |
| 23 | (Sweden) Pauli Freudenlund | | Suzuki | +2 laps | |
| 24 | (Finland) Risto Korhonen | | Suzuki | +2 laps | |
| Ret | (Italy) Franco Uncini | Gallina Team Suzuki | Suzuki | Retired | |
| Ret | (United States) Freddie Spencer | Honda Racing Corporation | Honda | Retired | |
| Ret | (Norway) Alf Henrik Graarud | | Yamaha | Retired | |
| Ret | (Italy) Graziano Rossi | Marlboro Team Agostini | Yamaha | Retired | |
| Ret | (Italy) Loris Reggiani | Gallina Team Suzuki | Suzuki | Retired | |
| Ret | (France) Guy Bertin | Moto Sanvenero | Sanvenero | Retired | |
| Ret | (Italy) Virginio Ferrari | Team HB Suzuki | Suzuki | Retired | |
| Ret | (Denmark) Børge Nielsen | | Suzuki | Retired | |
| Ret | (Sweden) Ake Grahn | | Yamaha | Retired | |
| Ret | (Sweden) Kjeil Warz | | Yamaha | Retired | |
| Ret | (Norway) Bengt Slydal | | Suzuki | Retired | |
| Ret | (Denmark) Chris Fisker | | Suzuki | Retired | |
| DNS | (Italy) Guido Paci | Team MDS Belgarda | Yamaha | Did not start | |
| DNQ | (Sweden) Jan-Olof Odeholm | Kortedala MK | Suzuki | Did not qualify | |
| DNQ | (United Kingdom) Steve Williams | | Suzuki | Did not qualify | |

| Previous race: 1982 British Grand Prix | FIM Grand Prix World Championship; 1982 season | Next race: 1982 Finnish Grand Prix |
| Previous race: 1981 Swedish Grand Prix | Swedish Grand Prix | Next race: 1983 Swedish Grand Prix |
