= 1982 Grand Prix motorcycle racing season =

Sports season

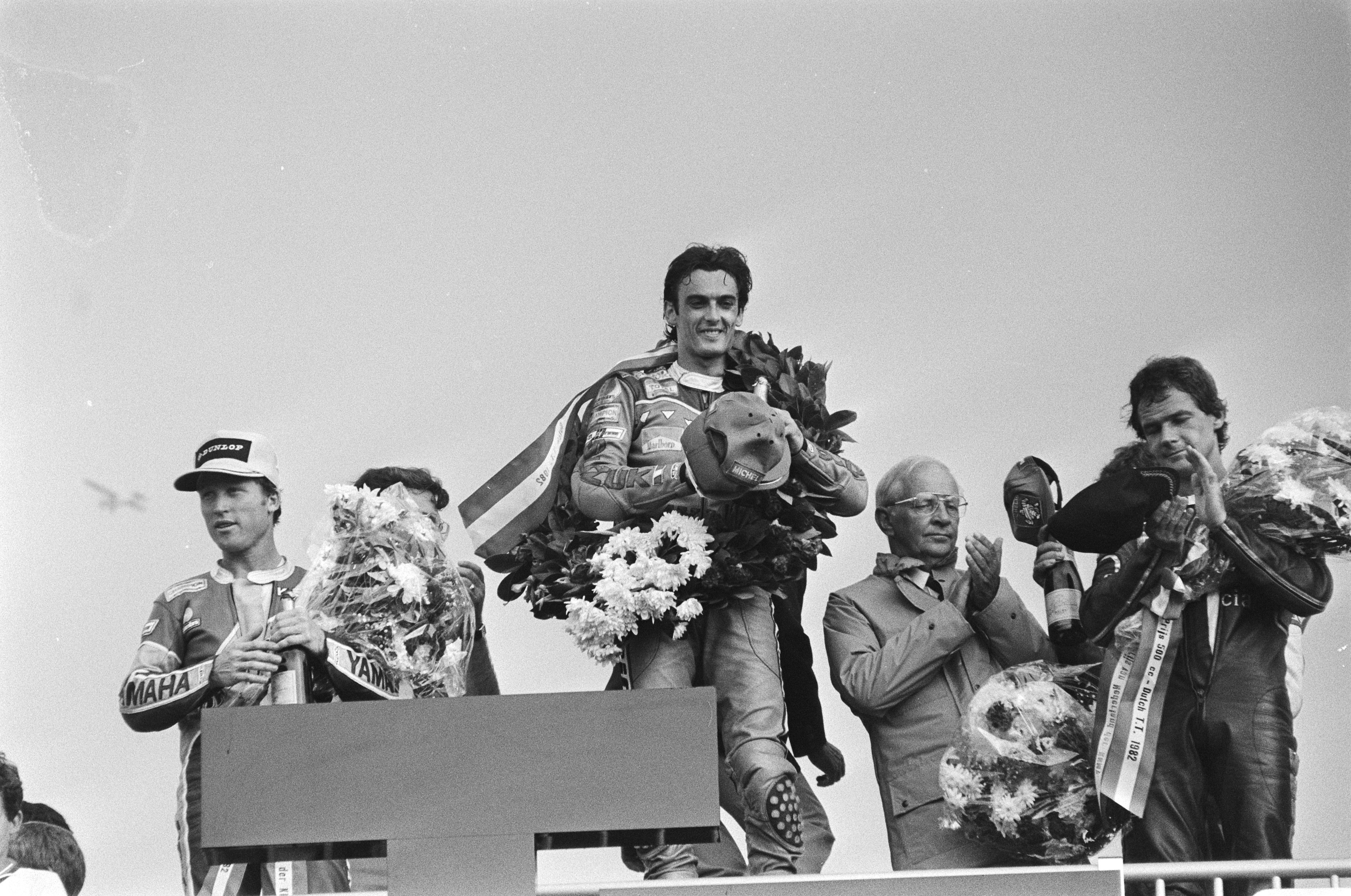
Franco Uncini (pictured in Assen) became the 1982 500cc world champion

The 1982 Grand Prix motorcycle racing season was the 34th F.I.M. Road Racing World Championship season.

== Season summary ==
Italian Franco Uncini on the Roberto Gallina backed Suzuki took a well-earned championship for Roberto Gallina's Italian Suzuki team in the 500cc class.

Yamaha introduced a new motorcycle with a V4 engine for Kenny Roberts but, suffered from having to develop a new bike during the season. Roberts was also now using Dunlop tires after Goodyear withdrew from motorcycle racing.

Honda abandoned its NR500 four-stroke in favor of a V3 two-stroke NS500 piloted by American newcomer, Freddie Spencer, defending champion Marco Lucchinelli and veteran Takazumi Katayama. Spencer would give Honda its first 500cc win since the 1967 season and its first with a two-stroke.

Kawasaki would continue to campaign its KR500 with rider Kork Ballington but developing a new motorcycle proved to be difficult, and after three years in the 500cc class without being able to recreate the same success they had experienced in the smaller classes, they made the decision to withdraw from world championship competition after the 1982 season leaving Ballington without a job.

Roberts injured a finger and a knee at the British Grand Prix and would miss the remainder of the season. Barry Sheene was lying third in the championship, tied on points with Roberts after eight rounds however, his season was brought to a premature end while testing the new Yamaha V4. He hit the obscured fallen machine of Frenchman Patrick Igoa during practice at Silverstone and badly broke both legs and an arm. Most of the factory sponsored riders boycotted the French round at Nogaro in protest of the unsafe track conditions.

Anton Mang successfully defended his 350 title for Kawasaki despite winning only one race. He would be the final 350 world champion as the class would be discontinued after 1982. Mang lost his 250 crown to Jean-Louis Tournadre by one point despite winning five races. Tournadre's only victory would be at the boycotted French round. The Frenchman would become France's first world champion. Angel Nieto clinched his eleventh title in the 125 class on a Garelli. In the 50cc class, Eugenio Lazzarini and Stefan Dörflinger traded wins, each rider winning three races, but Dörflinger took the title because of his three second-place finishes.

== 1982 Grand Prix season calendar ==
The following Grands Prix were scheduled to take place in 1982:

Round	Date	Grand Prix	Circuit
1	29 March	Grand Prix de la Republica Argentina	Autódromo Municipal de la Ciudad de Buenos Aires
2	2 May	(Austria) Großer Preis von Österreich	Salzburgring
3	9 May	Grand Prix de France Moto	Circuit de Nogaro
4	23 May	(Spain) Gran Premio Banco Atlántico	Circuito Permanente Del Jarama
5	30 May	(Italy) Gran Premio delle Nazioni	Circuito Internazionale Santa Monica
6	26 June	(Netherlands) Dutch TT Assen	TT Circuit Assen
7	4 July	Grand Prix of Belgium	Circuit de Spa-Francorchamps
8	18 July	(Socialist Federal Republic of Yugoslavia) Grand Prix of Yugoslavia	Autodrom Rijeka
9	1 August	(United Kingdom) Marlboro British Grand Prix	Silverstone Circuit
10	8 August	(Sweden) Swedish TT	Scandinavian Raceway
11	15 August	(Finland) Finnish GP	Imatra Circuit
12	29 August	(Czechoslovakia) Grand Prix ČSSR	Brno Circuit
13	5 September	Grand Prix San Marino	Autodromo Internazionale del Mugello
14	26 September	(Germany) Großer Preis von Deutschland	Hockenheimring

=== Calendar changes ===
- The German Grand Prix was moved back, from 3 May to 26 September.
- The French Grand Prix moved from the Paul Ricard circuit to the Circuit de Nogaro.
- The Nations Grand Prix moved from the Autodromo Nazionale Monza to the Circuito Internazionale Santa Monica.
- The Yugoslavian Grand Prix was moved back, from 31 May to 18 July.
- The San Marino Grand Prix was moved back, from 12 July to 5 September.
- The San Marino Grand Prix moved from the Autodromo Dino Ferrari to the Autodromo Internazionale del Mugello.

== Results and standings ==
=== 1982 Grand Prix season results ===
Round	Date	Race	Location	50cc winner	125cc winner	250cc winner	350cc winner	500cc winner	Report
1	29 March	(Argentina) Argentine Grand Prix	Buenos Aires		(Spain) Ángel Nieto		(Venezuela) Carlos Lavado	(United States) Kenny Roberts	Report
2	2 May	(Austria) Austrian Grand Prix	Salzburgring		(Spain) Ángel Nieto		(France) Eric Saul	(Italy) Franco Uncini	Report
3	9 May	(France) French Grand Prix	Nogaro		(France) Jean-Claude Selini	(France) Jean-Louis Tournadre	(France) Jean-François Baldé	(Switzerland) Michel Frutschi	Report
4	23 May	(Spain) Spanish Grand Prix	Jarama	(Switzerland) Stefan Dörflinger	(Spain) Ángel Nieto	(Venezuela) Carlos Lavado		(United States) Kenny Roberts	Report
5	30 May	(Italy) Nations Grand Prix	Misano	(Switzerland) Stefan Dörflinger	(Spain) Ángel Nieto	(Germany) Anton Mang	(Belgium) Didier de Radiguès	(Italy) Franco Uncini	Report
6	26 June	(Netherlands) Dutch TT	Assen	(Switzerland) Stefan Dörflinger	(Spain) Ángel Nieto	(Germany) Anton Mang	(France) Jean-François Baldé	(Italy) Franco Uncini	Report
7	4 July	(Belgium) Belgian Grand Prix	Spa-Francorchamps		(Spain) Ricardo Tormo	(Germany) Anton Mang		(United States) Freddie Spencer	Report
8	18 July	(Socialist Federal Republic of Yugoslavia) Yugoslavian Grand Prix	Rijeka	(Italy) Eugenio Lazzarini	(Italy) Eugenio Lazzarini	(Belgium) Didier de Radiguès		(Italy) Franco Uncini	Report
9	1 August	(United Kingdom) British Grand Prix	Silverstone		(Spain) Ángel Nieto	(West Germany) Martin Wimmer	(France) Jean-François Baldé	(Italy) Franco Uncini	Report
10	8 August	(Sweden) Swedish Grand Prix	Anderstorp		(Venezuela) Iván Palazzese	(Switzerland) Roland Freymond		(Japan) Takazumi Katayama	Report
11	15 August	(Finland) Finnish Grand Prix	Imatra		(Venezuela) Iván Palazzese	(France) Christian Sarron	(West Germany) Anton Mang		Report
12	29 August	(Czechoslovakia) Czechoslovak Grand Prix	Brno Circuit		(Italy) Eugenio Lazzarini	(Venezuela) Carlos Lavado	(Belgium) Didier de Radiguès		Report
13	5 September	San Marino Grand Prix	Mugello	(Italy) Eugenio Lazzarini		(Germany) Anton Mang		(United States) Freddie Spencer	Report
14	26 September	(Germany) German Grand Prix	Hockenheim	(Italy) Eugenio Lazzarini		(Germany) Anton Mang	(Germany) Manfred Herweh	(United States) Randy Mamola	Report

=== 500cc riders' standings ===
Scoring system

Points were awarded to the top ten finishers in each race. A rider has to finish the race to earn points. All races counted towards the final standings.

Position	1st	2nd	3rd	4th	5th	6th	7th	8th	9th	10th
Points	15	12	10	8	6	5	4	3	2	1

Place	Rider	Team	Machine	ARG (Argentina)	AUT (Austria)	FRA (France)	ESP (Spain)	NAT (Italy)	NED (Netherlands)	BEL (Belgium)	YUG (Socialist Federal Republic of Yugoslavia)	GBR (United Kingdom)	SWE (Sweden)	SMR (San Marino)	GER (Germany)	Points
1	(Italy) Franco Uncini	Gallina-Suzuki	RG500	4	1	WD	3	1	1	3	1	1	Ret	Ret	Ret	103
2	(New Zealand) Graeme Crosby	Marlboro Agostini-Yamaha	YZR500	Ret	4	WD	4	3	4	Ret	2	3	3	3	Ret	76
3	(United States) Freddie Spencer	HRC-Honda	NS500	3	Ret	WD	Ret	2	Ret	1	4	2	Ret	1	Ret	72
4	(United States) Kenny Roberts	Yamaha International	YZR500	1	3	WD	1	4	2	4	Ret	Ret				68
5	(United Kingdom) Barry Sheene	JPS-Yamaha	YZR500	2	2	WD	2	Ret	3	2	3	DNS				68
6	(United States) Randy Mamola	HB-Suzuki	RG500	Ret	7	WD	Ret	Ret	5	5	7	5	2	2	1	65
7	(Japan) Takazumi Katayama	HRC-Honda	NS500	6	9	WD	6	7	8	Ret	5	Ret	1	Ret	4	48
8	(Italy) Marco Lucchinelli	HRC-Honda	NS500	5	Ret	WD	5	5	Ret	6	8	17	5	6	5	43
9	(South Africa) Kork Ballington	Team Kawasaki	KR500	8	Ret	WD	9	6	7	8	10	7	6	7	Ret	31
10	(France) Marc Fontan	Sonauto Gauloises-Yamaha	YZR500	7	Ret	WD	7	9	9	10	Ret	8	4	Ret	6	29
11	(Italy) Virginio Ferrari	HB-Suzuki	RG500	Ret	17				Ret		16	6	Ret	4	2	25
12	(Netherlands) Boet van Dulmen	Hordo Racing	YZR500	11	5	WD	DNS		6	7	11	DNS	7	Ret	7	23
13	(Italy) Loris Reggiani	Gallina-Suzuki	RG500	10	21	WD	DNS		18	17	9	4	Ret	Ret	3	21
14	(Switzerland) Michel Frutschi	Sanvenero	Sanvenero 500	16		1	Ret	Ret	19	9	Ret		12	Ret	11	17
15	(Switzerland) Sergio Pellandini		RG500	17	Ret	4	Ret	Ret	11	Ret	23	Ret	9	9	8	15
16	(Netherlands) Jack Middelburg	Ergon Suzuki Racing	RG500	9	Ret	WD	Ret		Ret	Ret	6			5	Ret	13
17	(France) Frank Gross		RG500			2	16	13		Ret	17	Ret			Ret	12
18	(United Kingdom) Steve Parrish	Mitsui-Yamaha	YZR500		16	3	13		14	Ret	22	18	10		Ret	11
19	(Italy) Leandro Becheroni		RG500		8	WD		8	27	18	21	9		8	Ret	11
20	(Italy) Guido Paci	Team MDS Belgarda	YZR500		11	6	10	Ret	Ret		18	26	Ret	10	12	7
21	(New Zealand) Stuart Avant	Guan Hoe Suzuki	RG500		Ret	5			15	12		21			Ret	6
22	(Switzerland) Philippe Coulon	Coulon Marlboro Tissot	RG500	15	13	10	12	12	Ret	15	14	20	8	13	9	6
23	(Finland) Seppo Rossi		RG500	Ret	6		Ret	Ret	17	13	15	Ret	11	Ret	Ret	5
24	(France) Philippe Robinet		RG500			7			DNQ	DNQ		Ret	19		16	4
25	(United Kingdom) Chris Guy	Sid Griffiths Racing	RG500		Ret	8			25	21	Ret	10	15	Ret		4
26	(Spain) Victor Palomo		RG500			Ret	8	18	21	Ret	DNS			Ret	Ret	3
27	(Switzerland) Andreas Hofmann		YZR500		10	9		Ret	16	DNQ		11	14	14	Ret	3
28	(Sweden) Peter Sjostrom		RG500			13	14	10	26	Ret	19	Ret	16	17	13	1
29	(South Africa) Jon Ekerold		RG500	18	12	18			Ret	16	Ret	13		Ret	10	1
30	(France) Raymond Roche		RG500			WD		11	10	Ret						1
	(Italy) Lorenzo Ghiselli		RG500		DNQ	12	11	15	Ret	DNQ				12		0
	(United Kingdom) Ron Haslam	Honda Britain	NR500						12	11		15				0
	(Italy) Graziano Rossi	Marlboro Agostini Yamaha	YZR500	13	14		Ret	Ret	13	Ret	28	Ret	Ret	11		0
	(Switzerland) Wolfgang von Muralt		RG500			11				Ret	26		13		Ret	0
	(Japan) Hiroyuki Kawasaki	HB-Suzuki	RG500		20				23	Ret	12					0
	(France) Bernard Fau	GPA Total	RG500	12	Ret	WD	Ret			DNQ						0
	(United Kingdom) Dave Dean	Rogersons of Wigan	RG500									12				0
	(Germany) Reinhold Roth	Wolfgang Kucera	FKN		15			Ret	20		13			18		0
	(France) Guy Bertin	Sanvenero	Sanvenero 500	19	DNQ	Ret	Ret		22	14	Ret		Ret			0
	(United Kingdom) Gary Lingham		RG500							19		14				0
	(Italy) Fabio Biliotti		RG500					14		20	20	27		Ret		0
	(Venezuela) Roberto Pietri		RG500	14								24				0
	(Denmark) Børge Nielsen		RG500			14			DNQ				Ret			0
	(Germany) Ernst Gschwender		RG500												14	0
	(Italy) Walter Magliorati		RG500		Ret				DNQ					15	15	0
	(Italy) Giovanni Pelletier	Morbidelli	Morbidelli 500	Ret	Ret	15		19	DNQ	DNQ				20	24	0
	(Sweden) Bent Slydal		RG500				15				24		DNS	Ret		0
	(Italy) Marco Papa		RG500		Ret	16	Ret					Ret		Ret		0
	(Switzerland) Peter Huber		RG500							Ret				16	Ret	0
	(Italy) Corrado Tuzii		RG500					16								0
	(Japan) Iwao Ishikawa		RG500									16				0
	(France) Jean Lafond	Claude Fior	RG500			Ret	17			Ret				Ret	17	0
	(Brazil) Marco Greco		RG500	20		17	19									0
	(Italy) Eddy Elias		YZR500					17						Ret		0
	(Sweden) Peter Skold		RG500										17			0
	(Austria) Josef Ragginger		RG500		18											0
	(Spain) Carlos Morante		RG500				18									0
	(Denmark) Benny Mortensen		RG500										18			0
	(Germany) Alfons Ammerschlager		RG500												18	0
	(United Kingdom) Steve Williams	Fowler's of Bristol/DTR	RG500									23	DNQ		19	0
	(Austria) Hans Steinhogel		RG500		19											0
	(United Kingdom) Steve Henshaw	Harold Coppack Racing	RG500									19				0
	(Italy) Luigi Rimoldi		RG500											19		0
	(Netherlands) Henk de Vries	Henk de Vries Motoren	RG500						24						20	0
	(Italy) Raffaele Pasqual		YZR500					20			29			Ret		0
	(Denmark) Kjeld Sorensen		RG500										20			0
	(Germany) Josef Hage		YZR500		Ret										21	0
	(Finland) Esko Kuparinen		RG500										21			0
	(Netherlands) Peter Looijesteijn	Dr Egel Banden	RG500		Ret				28	DNQ	25	Ret		Ret	22	0
	(Republic of Ireland) Norman Brown	Hector Neill Racing	RG500									22				0
	(Sweden) Cai Hedstrom		RG500										22			0
	(Sweden) Pauli Freudenlund		RG500										23			0
	(Germany) Klaus Klein		RG500												23	0
	(Finland) Risto Korhonen		RG500										24			0
	(United Kingdom) Bob Smith	Dennis Pratt Racing	RG500									25				0
	(Germany) Gerhard Treusch		RG500												25	0
	(Switzerland) Alain Roethlisberger		YZR500								27					0
	(United Kingdom) Mark Salle		RG500									28				0
	(Netherlands) Rinus van Kasteren		RG500						29							0
	(Germany) Gustav Reiner	Krauser MDS Racing Team	RG500							Ret	DNS				Ret	0
	(United Kingdom) Keith Huewen	Heron-Suzuki	RG500		Ret				DNQ	DNQ		Ret				0
	(United States) Gina Bovaird		RG500			Ret				DNQ						0
	(United Kingdom) Gary Padgett	Padgetts of Batley	RG500							DNQ		Ret				0
	(Germany) Anton Mang		RG500	Ret												0
	(Venezuela) Eduardo Aleman	Venemotos Yamaha	YZR500	Ret												0
	(Chile) Vincenzo Cascino		YZR500	Ret												0
	(Austria) Fritz Kerschbaumer		YZR500		Ret											0
	(France) Christian le Liard		RG500			Ret										0
	(France) Maurice Coq		RG500			Ret										0
	(France) Louis-Luc Maisto		RG500			Ret										0
	(Spain) Angel Nieto	Honda-HRC	NS500				Ret									0
	(Italy) Guido del Piano		RG500					Ret								0
	(United Kingdom) Graham Wood	Fowler's of Bristol/DTR	YZR500									Ret				0
	(New Zealand) Dennis Ireland		RG500									Ret				0
	(United Kingdom) Paul Iddon	Heron Suzuki	RG500									Ret				0
	(United Kingdom) Rob McElnea	FJ Gallen	RG500									Ret				0
	(United Kingdom) Con Law	Millar Racing	YZR500									Ret				0
	(United Kingdom) Barry Woodland		RG500									Ret				0
	(Sweden) Ake Grahn		YZR500										Ret			0
	(Denmark) Chris Fisker		RG500										Ret			0
	(Sweden) Kjeil Warz		YZR500										Ret			0
	(Norway) Alf Graarud		YZR500										Ret			0
	(Italy) Olivieri Cruciani		RG500											Ret		0
	(Italy) Maurizio Massimiani		LMC											Ret		0
	(Italy) Attilio Riondato		RG500											Ret		0
	(Germany) Ulrich Lang		Sebe												Ret	0
	(Netherlands) Dick Alblas		RG500						DNQ							0
	(Netherlands) Johan van Eijk		RG500						DNQ							0
	(Sweden) Jan Olof Odeholm	Kortedala MK	RG500										DNQ			0

=== 350cc standings ===
Place	Rider	Machine	ARG (Argentina)	AUT (Austria)	FRA (France)	NAT (Italy)	NED (Netherlands)	GBR (United Kingdom)	FIN (Finland)	TCH (Czechoslovakia)	GER (Germany)	Points
1	(West Germany) Anton Mang	Kawasaki	Ret	2	WD	4	2	3	1	2	2	81
2	(Belgium) Didier de Radiguès	Chevallier	3	Ret	2	1	DNS	2	Ret	1	12	64
3	(France) Jean-François Baldé	Kawasaki	2	Ret	1	Ret	1	1	Ret	14	9	59
4	(France) Eric Saul	Chevallier	4	1	Ret	6	7	17	7	5	3	52
5	(Venezuela) Carlos Lavado	Yamaha	1	Ret	WD	2	DNS	4	Ret	10		36
6	(South Africa) Alan North	Yamaha		6	4	Ret	3	Ret	9	11	5	31
7	(Switzerland) Jacques Cornu	Yamaha	5	5	8	9	Ret			3	7	31
8	(France) Christian Sarron	Yamaha		DNS	Ret	14	5	5	2	7	Ret	20
9	(France) Patrick Fernandez	Yamaha	Ret	3	WD	Ret	4	Ret	8	17	Ret	21
10	(West Germany) Gustav Reiner	Yamaha	6	Ret		7	6	13	Ret	6	DNS	19
11	(Switzerland) Wolfgang Von Muralt	Yamaha		7	7	12	Ret	15	Ret	12	4	16
12	(United Kingdom) Tony Head	Armstrong		12	9	15	8	8	5	9	Ret	16
13	(Germany) Manfred Herweh	Yamaha									1	15
14	(United Kingdom) Donnie Robinson	Yamaha		10	Ret	Ret	Ret	7	3			15
15	(Australia) Jeffrey Sayle	Armstrong	Ret	9	3	Ret	Ret	Ret	Ret	Ret	DNS	12
16	(Germany) Martin Wimmer	Yamaha	Ret		5	5	Ret	Ret	Ret	13	Ret	12
17	(Austria) Siegfried Minich	Rotax		4			11	16	Ret	8	DNS	11
18	(Italy) Massimo Matteoni	Yamaha		11	11	3	Ret	Ret	Ret	Ret	20	10
19	(France) Thierry Espié	Chevallier							Ret	4	Ret	8
20	(Finland) Eero Hyvärinen							19	4	Ret		8
21	(Germany) Herbert Hauf	Yamaha		Ret	6	8	Ret			DNQ	DNS	8
22	(Finland) Pekka Nurmi	Yamaha		Ret			Ret	9	Ret	Ret	6	7
23	(France) Pierre Bolle	Yamaha					9		6	16	15	7
24	(United Kingdom) Alan Watts	Yamaha						6			DNS	5
25	(Venezuela) Eduardo Aleman	Yamaha	7	21	Ret	Ret						4
26	(France) Roger Sibille	Yamaha		Ret	Ret	Ret	14	29	10	15	8	4
27	(United Kingdom) Tony Rogers	Armstrong	Ret	8	Ret							3
28	(Argentina) Victorio Minguzzi	Yamaha	8									3
29	(Argentina) Fernando Cerdera	Kawasaki	9									2
30	(Italy) Attilio Riondato	Yamaha				10	12			Ret	18	1
31	(Austria) Franz Kaserer	Yamaha		16			DNQ			Ret	10	1
32	(Finland) Reino Eskelinen	Yamaha		13	Ret		10	20	11	20	Ret	1
33	(United Kingdom) Steve Tonkin	Armstrong						10				1
34	(Netherlands) Mar Schouten	Yamaha		Ret	10	Ret	DNS	11			Ret	1
35	(Germany) Harald Eckl	Yamaha	10	20	14	Ret	17				Ret	1
	(Chile) Vincenzo Cascino	Yamaha	11									0
	(Italy) Marino Neri	GR2				11						0
	(Germany) Bodo Schmidt	Yamaha									11	0
	(Germany) Karl-Thomas Grassel	Yamaha		15		Ret	13	12	Ret	Ret	Ret	0
	(Switzerland) Bruno Luscher	Yamaha		Ret					12	22		0
	(Argentina) Yervant Samirdjian	Yamaha	12									0
	(France) Marie-Paul Violland	Yamaha			12							0
	(Switzerland) Edwin Weibel	Yamaha		18	Ret	13	Ret	28	14	19	14	0
	(Switzerland) Andreas Berger	Yamaha			Ret	16		Ret	13	21	Ret	0
	(Argentina) Pancracio Catania	Yamaha	13									0
	(France) Jean-Michel Mattioli	Yamaha			13							0
	(Germany) Mladen Tomic	Yamaha									13	0
	(Australia) Graeme McGregor	Yamaha	Ret	14	18		Ret	Ret				0
	(United Kingdom) Graham Young	Yamaha					18	14				0
	(Argentina) Oscar Foggia	Yamaha	14									0
	(Sweden) Christer Eliasson	Yamaha			16			Ret	15			0
	(Belgium) Rene Delaby	Yamaha		Ret		Ret	15	22		Ret	Ret	0
	(Sweden) Bengt Elgh	Yamaha		Ret	15							0
	(Austria) Josef Hutter	Yamaha		17			Ret			Ret	16	0
	(United Kingdom) Gary Padgett	Yamaha					16	Ret				0
	(Finland) Markku Loponen	Yamaha							16			0
	(United Kingdom) Steve Williams	Yamaha							17	18		0
	(United Kingdom) Con Law	Yamaha			17							0
	(Switzerland) Thierry Feuz	Yamaha								Ret	17	0
	(United Kingdom) Paul Tinker	Yamaha						18				0
	(Netherlands) Peter Looijesteijn	Yamaha		19			Ret					0
	(Sweden) Gunnar Bruhn	Yamaha							Ret		19	0
	(United Kingdom) Donnie McLeod	Yamaha						21				0
	(France) Jacques Bolle	Yamaha						23			Ret	0
	(Switzerland) Hans Naef	Yamaha								23	Ret	0
	(United Kingdom) Phil Mellor	Yamaha						24				0
	(Switzerland) Rudi Gächter	Yamaha								24		0
	(United Kingdom) Stewart Cole	Yamaha						25				0
	(Czechoslovakia) Peter Baláž	Rotax								25		0
	(Belgium) Michel Simeon	Yamaha					Ret	26			Ret	0
	(Czechoslovakia) Pavol Dekánek	Yamaha								26		0
	(United Kingdom) Steve Wright	Yamaha						27				0
	(United Kingdom) Dave Griffiths	Yamaha						30				0
	(Italy) Marcello Iannetta	Yamaha			Ret	Ret		31				0
	(Switzerland) Jakob Manser	Yamaha						32		DNQ		0
	(Belgium) Jose de Faveri	Yamaha		Ret			DNQ	Ret			Ret	0
	(Denmark) Svend Andersen	Yamaha		Ret			DNQ		Ret			0
	(United Kingdom) Clive Horton	Armstrong					Ret	Ret				0
	(Norway) Hans Hansebraten	HGH		Ret			DNQ					0
	(Netherlands) Dick van Logchem	Yamaha					Ret			DNQ		0
	(Brazil) Antonio Neto	Yamaha	Ret									0
	(Argentina) Marcelo Diaz	Yamaha	Ret									0
	(Argentina) Rafael Olavarria	Yamaha	Ret									0
	(Argentina) Alfredo Rios	Yamaha	Ret									0
	(Brazil) Adilou Mendez	Yamaha	Ret									0
	(Brazil) Lucilo Baumer	Yamaha	Ret									0
	(Argentina) Roberto Vaneta	Siroko	Ret									0
	(Brazil) Upiratau Rios	Yamaha	Ret									0
	(Argentina) Ricardo Blanco	Yamaha	Ret									0
	(Brazil) Miguel Silveira	Yamaha	Ret									0
	(Japan) Yasuaki Fujimoto	Yamaha				Ret						0
	(Spain) Toni Garcia	Yamaha				Ret						0
	(United Kingdom) Rob McElnea	Yamaha						Ret				0
	(United Kingdom) Tom Drury	Yamaha						Ret				0
	(United Kingdom) Simon Buckmaster	Yamaha						Ret				0
	(Finland) Kari Korpela	Yamaha							Ret			0
	(France) Jean-Louis Guignabodet	Kawasaki									Ret	0
	(Germany) Stefan Förtsch	Yamaha									Ret	0
	(Germany) Gerald Fischer	Yamaha									Ret	0
	(Austria) Tibor Foco	Beko									DNS	0
	(Germany) Rainer Nagel	Yamaha									DNS	0
	(Netherlands) Henk van Schijndel	Yamaha					DNQ					0
	(Netherlands) Rudie van der Dussen	Yamaha					DNQ					0
	(Japan) Yoshimasa Matsumoto	Yamaha					DNQ					0
	(Germany) Michael Lederer	Yamaha								DNQ		0
	(Czechoslovakia) Bohumil Staša	Yamaha								DNQ		0
	(Czechoslovakia) Petr Hlavatka	Yamaha								DNQ		0
	(Austria) Friederich Pöschl	Yamaha								DNQ		0
	(Czechoslovakia) Peter Majoroš	Yamaha								DNQ		0

=== 250cc standings ===
Place	Rider	Machine	FRA (France)	ESP (Spain)	NAT (Italy)	NED (Netherlands)	BEL (Belgium)	YUG (Socialist Federal Republic of Yugoslavia)	GBR (United Kingdom)	SWE (Sweden)	FIN (Finland)	TCH (Czechoslovakia)	SMR (San Marino)	GER (Germany)	Points
1	(France) Jean-Louis Tournadre	Yamaha	1	2	3	2	6	3	3	4	7	2	2	4	118
2	(West Germany) Anton Mang	Kawasaki	WD	3	1	1	1	Ret	2	2	6	8	1	1	117
3	(Switzerland) Roland Freymond	MBA	4	Ret	2	8	4	Ret	4	1	Ret	6	3	8	72
4	(West Germany) Martin Wimmer	Yamaha	9	DNS	Ret	7	7	Ret	1	6	Ret	3	4	DNS	48
5	(Venezuela) Carlos Lavado	Yamaha	WD	1	Ret	DNS		Ret	8	Ret	5	1	Ret		39
6	(Belgium) Didier de Radiguès	Yamaha	Ret	Ret	Ret	DNS	3	1	10		2	Ret	Ret	DNS	38
7	(Italy) Paolo Ferretti	MBA		Ret	Ret	Ret	5	2	7	Ret	Ret	Ret	Ret	2	34
8	(France) Jean-Louis Guignabodet	Kawasaki	6	6	14	4	16	9	5	Ret	8	Ret	Ret	10	30
9	(Australia) Jeff Sayle	Armstrong	3	8	Ret	3	14	7	23	16		22	Ret	Ret	27
10	(France) Christian Sarron	Yamaha	Ret	9	8	Ret	Ret	5	Ret	Ret	1	Ret	Ret	22	26
11	(France) Christian Estrosi	Pernod	13		5	18	Ret	Ret	9	5	Ret	7	Ret	6	23
12	(France) Jean-François Baldé	Kawasaki	2	Ret	11	Ret	23	11	13	3	Ret	Ret		12	22
13	(France) Thierry Espié	Pernod	Ret			9		10	6	9	Ret	Ret	9	3	18
14	(France) Patrick Fernandez	Bartol			Ret	5	Ret	14	12	Ret	16	5	8	5	21
15	(Spain) Sito Pons	Cobas	Ret	Ret		12	13	Ret	Ret	Ret	3	4	Ret	Ret	18
16	(Australia) Graeme McGregor	Yamaha				6	2		Ret						17
17	(Switzerland) Jacques Cornu	Yamaha	5	Ret	9	Ret	Ret	6		7		Ret	Ret	18	17
18	(Brazil) Antonio Neto	Yamaha	Ret	7	4	Ret									12
19	(France) Jacques Bolle	Yamaha	Ret	4	Ret	Ret	12	8	Ret	11		11		11	11
20	(Italy) Massimo Matteoni	Yamaha	10		Ret	19	11	4	Ret	22	Ret	9	Ret	Ret	11
21	(Italy) Massimo Broccoli	Ad Majora			6			Ret				Ret	5		11
22	(France) Jean Michel Mattioli	Yamaha					9		Ret	Ret	4	25	Ret	Ret	10
23	(United Kingdom) Donnie Robinson	Yamaha		5	Ret	11	8	Ret	15	10	DNS		Ret	DNQ	10
24	(Italy) Marcellino Lucchi	Yamaha			7			12					6		9
25	(France) Gabriel Grabia	Yamaha	7	15		10	DNQ	15	Ret	Ret	Ret		13	14	5
26	(Germany) Reinhold Roth	Yamaha											7		4
27	(Germany) Manfred Herweh	Yamaha												7	4
28	(United Kingdom) Tony Head	Armstrong	8	13		15	Ret	Ret	33	17	10	13	12	Ret	4
29	(United States) Richard Schlachter	Yamaha		Ret		16	Ret	Ret	19	8			10	17	4
30	(Netherlands) Mar Schouten	MBA	Ret	10	Ret	Ret	15	Ret	Ret	DNS				9	3
31	(Sweden) Bengt Elgh	Yamaha			13	20	DNQ	Ret	26	20	9		DNQ	Ret	2
32	(France) Andre Gouin	Yamaha					10								1
33	(Belgium) Jean Marc Toffolo	Rotax				14	Ret	Ret	17	15	15	10	11	Ret	1
34	(Italy) Pier Luigi Conforti	Kawasaki			10								Ret		1
	(Belgium) Etienne Geeraerd	Armstrong	Ret			Ret	20		11	12	19	15			0
	(Finland) Eero Hyvarinen	Yamaha	12	Ret		Ret	DNQ		27	18	11	17	DNQ		0
	(France) Patrick Chatelet	Yamaha	11												0
	(Venezuela) Eduardo Aleman	Yamaha		11											0
	(Switzerland) Bruno Luscher	Yamaha		18			17	13	25	13		12	14	19	0
	(Italy) Pierluigi Aldrovandi	Yamaha	14	16	12		22	Ret			17	Ret			0
	(Italy) Franco Marchegiani	Yamaha		12	15	Ret						21	DNQ	25	0
	(Finland) Pekka Nurmi	Yamaha									12				0
	(Japan) Tadasu Ikeda	Yamaha							16					13	0
	(United Kingdom) Paul Harris	Yamaha							18		13	20	17	Ret	0
	(Belgium) Michel Simeon	Yamaha				13	Ret		29	25		Ret	Ret	Ret	0
	(France) Pierre Bolle	Yamaha	Ret	14			Ret	Ret	21	Ret	Ret	Ret	15	Ret	0
	(Austria) Siegfried Minich	Rotax		Ret		23	19	Ret	Ret	14			Ret	DNS	0
	(Germany) Herbert Besendorfer	Yamaha										14		Ret	0
	(United Kingdom) Pete Wild	Yamaha							14						0
	(Finland) Jussi Hautanimi	Yamaha									14				0
	(Germany) Johannes Klement	Yamaha												15	0
	(Germany) Karl-Thomas Grassel	Yamaha		Ret			DNQ			21			18	16	0
	(Switzerland) Hans Müller	MBA			16	Ret			Ret	DNQ	Ret	19			0
	(Denmark) Leif Nielsen	Rotax					DNQ			19		Ret	16	23	0
	(Denmark) Svend Andersson	Yamaha						16		Ret					0
	(Switzerland) Edwin Weibel	Yamaha										16			0
	(Germany) Herbert Hauf	Yamaha			Ret	Ret	DNQ	17					DNQ	21	0
	(United Kingdom) Clive Horton	Armstrong				17			Ret						0
	(Spain) Enrique de Juan	Rotax		17											0
	(France) Michel Galbit	Yamaha					18		30		DNS	18			0
	(Cuba) Jose Moreno	Yamaha									18	Ret			0
	(Switzerland) Constant Pittet	Yamaha										28	19		0
	(Finland) Jarmo Liitia	Rotax					Ret				20				0
	(United Kingdom) Donnie McLeod	Yamaha							20						0
	(Germany) Gerhard Waibel	Kawasaki												20	0
	(South Africa) Johnny Scott	Yamaha				DNQ	21		32			27	DNQ	DNQ	0
	(Netherlands) Dick van Logchem	Yamaha				21						Ret			0
	(Italy) Maurizio Vitali	MBA			Ret	22	Ret	Ret	22	Ret			Ret		0
	(Sweden) Per Jansson	Yamaha								23					0
	(Austria) Thomas Bacher	Yamaha										23			0
	(Spain) Marcellino Garcia	Yamaha		Ret			24	Ret							0
	(Austria) Stefan Klabacher	Rotax								24		Ret		Ret	0
	(United Kingdom) Steve Tonkin	Armstrong							24						0
	(Switzerland) Nedy Crotta	Yamaha										24			0
	(Germany) Jürgen Schmid	Yamaha												24	0
	(Spain) Luis Miguel Reyes	Rotax					DNQ					26	DNQ		0
	(Germany) O. Buerkle	Yamaha												26	0
	(Germany) Jakob Beck	Rotax												27	0
	(Belgium) Rene Delaby	Yamaha				DNQ	DNQ		28				DNQ	DNS	0
	(United Kingdom) Steve Wright	Yamaha							31						0
	(Spain) Antonio Garcia	Yamaha		Ret	Ret										0
	(Republic of Ireland) Graham Young	Rotax					Ret		Ret						0
	(France) Pierre Tocco	Yamaha	Ret				DNQ								0
	(France) Patrick Igoa	Yamaha	Ret												0
	(United Kingdom) Tony Rogers	Armstrong	Ret												0
	(France) Thierry Rapicault	Yamaha	Ret												0
	(France) Herve Guilleux	Siroco	Ret												0
	(Venezuela) Rafael Olavarria	Yamaha		Ret											0
	(Venezuela) Ivan Palazzese	MBA			Ret										0
	(South Africa) Alan North	Yamaha				Ret									0
	(Italy) Marino Neri	Ad Majora						Ret							0
	(United Kingdom) Phil Mellor	Yamaha							Ret						0
	(Czechoslovakia) Marián Srna	Rotax										Ret			0
	(Czechoslovakia) Vladimír Jarolím	Yamaha										Ret			0
	(Czechoslovakia) Jan Bartůněk	Jawa										Ret			0
	(France) Eric Saul	Chevallier											Ret		0
	(Germany) Hans Becker	Yamaha												Ret	0
	(Spain) Ricardo Tormo	Bartol												Ret	0
	(Germany) Michael Lederer	Yamaha												Ret	0
	(Germany) Siegfried Zacharias	Rotax												DNS	0
	(Sweden) Eilert Lundstedt	Yamaha								DNQ			DNQ		0
	(Netherlands) Roel Toornstra	Rotax				DNQ									0
	(Netherlands) Henk van Schijndel	Yamaha				DNQ									0
	(Netherlands) Anton Straver	Yamaha				DNQ									0
	(Belgium) Paul Ramon	Yamaha					DNQ								0
	(Belgium) Jose de Faveri	Yamaha					DNQ								0
	(Belgium) Stephane Mertens	Yamaha					DNQ								0
	(Switzerland) Hans Naef	Yamaha					DNQ								0
	(Switzerland) Jakob Mansser	Yamaha					DNQ								0
	(Spain) Angel Nieto	Siroko					DNQ								0
	(Belgium) Jean Regimont	Rotax					DNQ								0
	(Belgium) Guy de Wael	Yamaha					DNQ								0
	(Sweden) Peter Linden	Yamaha								DNQ					0
	(Italy) Fabrizio Fantini	Rotax											DNQ		0
	(Austria) Erich Klein	MBA											DNQ		0
	(Germany) Frank Steinhausen	Kawasaki												DNQ	0
	(Spain) Victor Palomo	Kobas												DNQ	0
	(Germany) Mladen Tomic	Yamaha												DNQ	0

=== 125cc standings ===
Place	Rider	Machine	ARG (Argentina)	AUT (Austria)	FRA (France)	ESP (Spain)	NAT (Italy)	NED (Netherlands)	BEL (Belgium)	YUG (Socialist Federal Republic of Yugoslavia)	GBR (United Kingdom)	SWE (Sweden)	FIN (Finland)	TCH (Czechoslovakia)	Points
1	(Spain) Angel Nieto	Garelli	1	1	WD	1	1	1	5	3	1	6			111
2	(Italy) Eugenio Lazzarini	Garelli	8	Ret	WD	2	Ret	2	2	1	4	2	5	1	95
3	(Venezuela) Iván Palazzese	MBA	5	Ret	21	Ret	3	6	Ret	5	5	1	1	2	75
4	(Italy) Pier Paolo Bianchi	Sanvenero	6	3	Ret	Ret	2	Ret	3	2	3	Ret			59
5	(Spain) Ricardo Tormo	Sanvenero	2	Ret	WD	8	Ret	5	1	Ret	2	Ret	Ret	3	58
6	(Austria) August Auinger	MBA	4	2	Ret	Ret	Ret	Ret	6	Ret	8	3	2	6	55
7	(Italy) Pier Luigi Aldrovandi	MBA		5	Ret	3	4	3	Ret	6	6	Ret	4	Ret	52
8	(Switzerland) Hans Müller	MBA	Ret	4	WD	4	6	4	4	Ret	7	Ret	Ret	4	49
9	(France) Jean-Claude Selini	MBA	15	DNQ	1	5	Ret	7	7	Ret	17	5	9	9	39
10	(Finland) Johnny Wickström	MBA		15	2	6	8	10	11	Ret	16	9	3	11	33
11	(Argentina) Hugo Vignetti	Sanvenero	7	16	3	Ret	5	8	8	Ret				Ret	26
12	(Argentina) Willy Perez	MBA	3	Ret	4	14	Ret	Ret	10	13	10	Ret	12	14	20
13	(Italy) Maurizio Vitali	MBA		10	Ret	9	Ret	Ret	Ret	4	14	4	Ret	Ret	19
14	(Germany) Gerhard Waibel	MBA	9	DNS	7	10	Ret	9	9	9	18	11	Ret	5	19
15	(Switzerland) Bruno Kneubühler	MBA		Ret	WD	7	7	Ret			9	7	13	7	18
16	(Italy) Domenico Brigaglia	MBA					9			10		8	6	8	14
17	(Germany) Alfred Waibel	MBA	Ret	9	6	11	17	13	Ret	12	23	Ret	14		7
18	(Finland) Matti Kinnunen	MBA		12	5	13	14	Ret	14	11	13	Ret	Ret	Ret	6
19	(Austria) Hans Hummel	Sachs		6				DNQ						Ret	5
20	(Italy) Roberto Ruosi	MBA					11	15	Ret	7	Ret	Ret	10		5
21	(Austria) Erich Klein	MBA		7	Ret	17	Ret	11	17	Ret	20	12	11	12	4
22	(Netherlands) Anton Straver	MBA						17	15	Ret	15	14	7	Ret	4
23	(Finland) Ilkka Jaakkola	MBA										10	8	17	4
24	(Germany) Helmut Lichtenberg	MBA		8				23	21	15	31	20	17	18	3
25	(Belgium) Olivier Liégeois	Sanvenero		11	8	Ret		Ret	Ret	23	Ret	Ret	Ret	13	3
26	(Switzerland) Stefan Dörflinger	MBA		Ret	WD	Ret	Ret	Ret	Ret	8	11	Ret	Ret		3
27	(United Kingdom) Alex Bedford	MBA	Ret	17	9	Ret	15	Ret	13		Ret	13	Ret		2
28	(Finland) Esa Kytölä	MBA			10				18			Ret	Ret		1
29	(Netherlands) Henk van Kessel	MBA	Ret	Ret	13	16	Ret	Ret	Ret			Ret		10	1
30	(Sweden) Per-Edward Carlsson	MBA	10	DNS	11	12	Ret	12	Ret	Ret	Ret	Ret	19	Ret	1
31	(Italy) Libero Piccirillo	MBA					10								1
	(Venezuela) Miguel Gonzales	MBA	11												0
	(Belgium) Lucio Pietroniro	MBA		19	14			19	16		12				0
	(France) Jacky Hutteau	MBA			12	15	16	16	20	Ret	28	15		Ret	0
	(Netherlands) Willem Heykoop	Sanvenero						Ret	12		19			Ret	0
	(Argentina) Norberto Gatti	MBA	12												0
	(Italy) Stefano Caracchi	MBA					12								0
	(Switzerland) Peter Sommer	MBA	Ret	13	Ret	18				19	29	Ret		20	0
	(Argentina) Oscar Recouso	MBA	13												0
	Jason Mraz (col)	Sanvenero					13								0
	(Spain) Andreas Sanches-Marin	Sanvenero	Ret	DNS	16	Ret	18	14	19	Ret	24	Ret			0
	(Netherlands) Theo Timmer	MBA		14		DNQ		20		Ret		18			0
	(Argentina) Jose Luis Sosa	MBA	14												0
	(Socialist Federal Republic of Yugoslavia) Zdravko Ljeljak	MBA								14					0
	(Sweden) Jan Bäckström	MBA			15	Ret		18	Ret	16	25	Ret	Ret	16	0
	(Finland) Juha Pakkanen	MBA										Ret	15		0
	(Czechoslovakia) Peter Baláž	MBA												15	0
	(France) Frédéric Michel	MBA			18				22		21	Ret	16		0
	(Argentina) Juan Bocoy	MBA	16												0
	(Sweden) Håkon Olsson	Starol										16			0
	(France) Paul Bordes	MBA			17				Ret		32			Ret	0
	(Venezuela) Fabian Gonzales	MBA	17												0
	(Socialist Federal Republic of Yugoslavia) Janez Pintar	MBA								17					0
	(Sweden) Henry Riedel	MBA										17			0
	(Denmark) Per Larsen	MBA		Ret			19	Ret	DNQ	18		Ret			0
	(Switzerland) Rolf Rüttimann	MBA									34		18		0
	(Germany) Robert Bauer	MBA		18				DNQ							0
	(Chile) Antonio Barbosa	Honda	18												0
	(Austria) Werner Schmied	MBA		20	19					20	33				0
	(Sweden) Tore Alexandersson	MBA									30	19	Ret	22	0
	(Italy) Giuseppe Ascareggi	MBA				19		DNQ		Ret					0
	(Czechoslovakia) Zbyněk Havrda	MBA												19	0
	(France) François Wirtz	MBA			20										0
	(Netherlands) Kees van der Ven	MBA						21	23						0
	(Denmark) Thomas Pedersen	MBA		21								DNQ			0
	(Socialist Federal Republic of Yugoslavia) Marijan Kosic	MBA								21					0
	(Italy) Carlo Succi	MBA												21	0
	(Belgium) Chris Baert	MBA						DNQ			22			Ret	0
	(Austria) Heinz Pristavnik	MBA		22											0
	(Netherlands) Hans Spaan	MBA						22							0
	(Socialist Federal Republic of Yugoslavia) Drago Josipovic	MBA								22					0
	(France) Patrick Gross	Condor												23	0
	(Switzerland) Reiner Koster	MBA						DNQ	DNQ	24	Ret			Ret	0
	(Netherlands) Jan Huberts	Sanvenero						24							0
	(Belgium) Serge Julin	MBA							24						0
	(United Kingdom) Ray Swann	MBA									26				0
	(United Kingdom) Dave Shearer	MBA									27				0
	(United Kingdom) Bill Robertson	MBA									35				0
	(Algeria) Bady Hassaine	MBA			Ret	Ret								Ret	0
	(Switzerland) Joe Genoud	MBA		Ret	Ret			DNQ							0
	(Hungary) Janos Drapal	Bartol		Ret										Ret	0
	(Germany) Hagen Klein	Sanvenero		DNQ				DNQ		Ret					0
	(Venezuela) Ivan Troisi	MBA	Ret												0
	(Argentina) Franco Incorvaia	MBA	Ret												0
	(Argentina) Dario Casais	MBA	Ret												0
	(Chile) Jaime Bustamante	MBA	Ret												0
	(Argentina) Miguel Gugliara	MBA	Ret												0
	(Netherlands) Jan Eggens	EGA		Ret											0
	(Socialist Federal Republic of Yugoslavia) Alojz Pavlic	MBA		Ret											0
	(Spain) Antonio Boronat	MBA				Ret									0
	(Italy) Fausto Gresini	MBA					Ret								0
	(Italy) Ezio Mischiatti	MBA					Ret								0
	(Belgium) René Renier	MBA							Ret						0
	(Italy) Rino Zuliani	MBA								Ret					0
	(United Kingdom) David Fabian	Sanvenero									Ret				0
	(United Kingdom) Tony Smith	MBA									Ret				0
	(United Kingdom) Peter Banks	MBA									Ret				0
	(Germany) Wolfgang Glawaty	MBA												Ret	0
	(Czechoslovakia) Zbyněk Havrda Jr.	MBA												Ret	0
	(Czechoslovakia) Bedřich Fendrich	Juventa												Ret	0
	(Czechoslovakia) Ladislav Polák	MBA												Ret	0
	(Netherlands) George Looijesteijn	EGA						DNQ	DNQ						0
	(Austria) Günter Leitner	MBA		DNQ											0
	(Spain) Pablo Cegarra	Sanvenero				DNQ									0
	(Belgium) Freddy Blaise	MBA							DNQ						0
	(Belgium) Luc Beugnier	Honda							DNQ						0
	(Sweden) Lars Carlsson	MBA										DNQ			0
	(Finland) Olli Kujansuu	MBA										DNQ			0

=== 50cc standings ===
Place	Rider	Machine	ESP (Spain)	NAT (Italy)	NED (Netherlands)	YUG (Socialist Federal Republic of Yugoslavia)	SMR (San Marino)	GER (Germany)	Points
1	(Switzerland) Stefan Dörflinger	Kreidler	1	1	1	2	2	2	81
2	(Italy) Eugenio Lazzarini	Garelli	2	Ret	2	1	1	1	69
3	(Italy) Claudio Lusuardi	Villa	3	3	6	4	Ret	3	43
4	(Spain) Ricardo Tormo	Bultaco	Ret	2	3	3		4	40
5	(Italy) Giuseppe Ascareggi	Minarelli	5	4	4	5	3	11	38
6	(Austria) Hans Hummel	Sachs		6	5	9	5	DNS	19
7	(Netherlands) Theo Timmer	Bultaco	4	Ret	7	8	Ret	Ret	15
8	(Italy) Massimo de Lorenzi	Minarelli		5		15	4		14
9	(Netherlands) Hans Spaan	Kreidler	8	Ret	9	7	8	Ret	12
10	(West Germany) Hagen Klein	Massa-Real	10	8	Ret	Ret		5	10
11	(Spain) Jorge Martinez	Bultaco	6	Ret	Ret	6			10
12	(Germany) Rainer Scheidhauer	Kreidler		Ret	8	11	7	8	10
13	(Netherlands) George Looijensteijn	Kreidler	7	11	Ret	10	18	7	9
14	(Austria) Otto Machinek	Kreidler		13	21	12	6	13	5
15	(Germany) Gerhard Bauer	Kreidler						6	5
16	(Germany) Ingo Emmerich	Kreidler	15	7	Ret		Ret	10	5
17	(Germany) Gerhard Singer	Hess	17	Ret	11	Ret	9		2
18	(Socialist Federal Republic of Yugoslavia) Peter Verbic	Kreidler				13	17	9	2
19	(Italy) Paolo Priori	Paolucci		9	17		15		2
20	(Switzerland) Rolf Blatter	Kreidler	9	Ret					2
21	(Netherlands) Henk van Kessel	Kreidler	Ret	10	Ret			Ret	1
22	(Netherlands) Paul Rimmelzwaan	Kreidler			10	Ret	Ret	15	1
23	(Italy) Mauro Mordenti	Rossi		Ret			10		1
	(Socialist Federal Republic of Yugoslavia) Zdravko Matulja	Tomos			14	Ret	11		0
	(Germany) Richard Bay	Maico	11		Ret			18	0
	(Spain) Ramon Gali	Bultaco	12	Ret		14			0
	(Netherlands) Rini Vrijdag	Kreidler			12			16	0
	(Germany) Kasimir Rapczynski	Kreidler			19	Ret		12	0
	(Germany) Thomas Engl	Engl	20		23	Ret	12	Ret	0
	(Italy) Claudio Granata	Kreidler		12		21	Ret		0
	(Belgium) Chris Baert	H.H.		14	24		13	21	0
	(Germany) Uli Merz	Kreidler			13	16			0
	(France) Yves Dupont	Kreidler	13	Ret					0
	(Italy) Giuliano Tabanelli	Ringhini				18	14		0
	(Germany) Günter Schirnhofer	Kreidler	DNQ		Ret	22	Ret	14	0
	(Italy) Giuliano Gerani	BBFT	14	Ret		Ret	Ret		0
	(Germany) Gerhard Waibel	Schuster	16		15	Ret			0
	(Italy) Nicola Casadei	Tomos		15			16		0
	(Netherlands) Jos van Dongen	Bultaco	18		16	20	21	17	0
	(Germany) Rainer Kunz	FKN	Ret	Ret	Ret	17	Ret	Ret	0
	(France) Pascal Kambourian	Bultaco	Ret	Ret	18				0
	(Spain) Joaquin Gali	Bultaco	Ret	Ret		19			0
	(Portugal) Henrique Sande	Kreidler	19						0
	(Italy) Sandro de Rosa	Villa					19		0
	(Germany) Bruno Treutlein	Kreidler						19	0
	(Switzerland) Joe Genoud	Kreidler	Ret		20	23	Ret		0
	(Italy) Guido Sala	MTK					20		0
	(Germany) Hans-Joachim Ritter	Kreidler						20	0
	(Switzerland) Reiner Koster	Kreidler	21		Ret	24	23	Ret	0
	(Italy) Salvatore Milano	UFO		Ret			22		0
	(Finland) Mika-Sakari Komu	Kreidler			Ret			22	0
	(Netherlands) Wim de Jong	Kreidler			22				0
	(United Kingdom) Spencer Crabbe	Kreidler						23	0
	(Switzerland) Hubert Genoud	Engl	Ret		Ret				0
	(Spain) Daniel Mateos	Bultaco	Ret						0
	(France) Yves Le Toumelin	Kreidler	Ret						0
	(Austria) Günter Leitner	Kreidler			Ret				0
	(Italy) Mario Stocco	Kreidler				Ret			0
	(Socialist Federal Republic of Yugoslavia) Miklos Bojan	Kreidler				Ret			0
	(Socialist Federal Republic of Yugoslavia) Vuk Tomanovic	Kreidler				Ret			0
	(Socialist Federal Republic of Yugoslavia) Persic	Sever				Ret			0
	(Italy) Massimo Fargeri	UFO					Ret		0
	(Italy) Pasquale Buonfante	Kreidler					Ret		0
	(Italy) Enrico Cereda	Kreidler					Ret		0
	(Germany) Bernd Rossbach	Kreidler						Ret	0
	(Germany) Reinhard Koberstein	Kreidler						Ret	0
	(Germany) Klaus Kull	Kreidler						Ret	0
	(Germany) Stefan Kurfiss	Kreidler						DNS	0
	(United Kingdom) John Kernan	MBA	DNQ						0

== Bibliography ==
- Büla, Maurice & Schertenleib, Jean-Claude (2001). Continental Circus 1949-2000. Chronosports S.A. ISBN 2-940125-32-5
- Peter Clifford (1982). Motocourse 1982-83. Hazleton Publishing. ISBN 978-0905138220.
