= 1983 Dutch TT =

(Netherlands) 1983 Dutch TT
Race details
- Race 8 of 12 races in the 1983 Grand Prix motorcycle racing season
- Date: 25 June 1983
- Official name: Dutch TT Assen
- Location: TT Circuit Assen
- Course: Permanent racing facility; 7.685 km (4.775 mi)

500cc
Pole position
- Rider: (United States) Kenny Roberts
- Time: 2:48.520
Fastest lap
- Rider: (United States) Kenny Roberts
- Time: 2:47.470
Podium
- First: (United States) Kenny Roberts
- Second: (Japan) Takazumi Katayama
- Third: (United States) Freddie Spencer

250cc
Pole position
- Rider: (Venezuela) Carlos Lavado
- Time: 2:56.940
Fastest lap
- Rider: (Venezuela) Carlos Lavado
- Time: 2:57.790
Podium
- First: (Venezuela) Carlos Lavado
- Second: (Venezuela) Iván Palazzese
- Third: (France) Hervé Guilleux

125cc
Pole position
- Rider: (Italy) Eugenio Lazzarini
- Time: 3:06.670
Fastest lap
- Rider: (Spain) Ángel Nieto
- Time: 3:05.620
Podium
- First: (Spain) Ángel Nieto
- Second: (Spain) Ricardo Tormo
- Third: (Switzerland) Bruno Kneubühler

50cc
Pole position
- Rider: (Switzerland) Stefan Dörflinger
- Time: 3:29.110
Fastest lap
- Rider: (Italy) Eugenio Lazzarini
- Time: 3:24.870
Podium
- First: (Italy) Eugenio Lazzarini
- Second: (Switzerland) Stefan Dörflinger
- Third: (Spain) Ricardo Tormo

The 1983 Dutch TT was the eighth round of the 1983 Grand Prix motorcycle racing season. It took place on the weekend of 24–25 June 1983 at the TT Circuit Assen located in Assen, Netherlands.

== Classification ==
=== 500 cc ===
Pos.	Rider	Team	Machine	Time/Retired	Points
1	(United States) Kenny Roberts	Marlboro Agostini-Yamaha	YZR500	45'29.120	15
2	(Japan) Takazumi Katayama	HRC-Honda	NS500	+0.190	12
3	(United States) Freddie Spencer	HRC-Honda	NS500	+6.940	10
4	(United States) Randy Mamola	HB Sinclair-Suzuki	RG500	+16.080	8
5	(United States) Eddie Lawson	Marlboro Agostini Yamaha	YZR500	+40.530	6
6	(Netherlands) Jack Middelburg	Stichting Ned-Honda	RS500	+51.290	5
7	(France) Marc Fontan	Sonauto Gauloises-Yamaha	YZR500	+56.480	4
8	(Netherlands) Boet van Dulmen	Shell Nederland-Suzuki	RG500	+1'19.930	3
9	(France) Raymond Roche	Moto Club Paul Ricard	NS500	+1'27.860	2
10	(United Kingdom) Mark Salle		RG500	+1'48.680	1
11	(New Zealand) Stuart Avant		RG500	+2'22.970	
12	(United Kingdom) Norman Brown	Hector Neill Racing	RG500	+2'26.380	
13	(Netherlands) Henk de Vries	Henk de Vries Motoren	RG500	+2'39.780	
14	(Netherlands) Rob Punt	M Woestenburg	RG500	+2'39.940	
15	(Finland) Eero Hyvärinen		RG500	+2'50.080	
16	(West Germany) Ernst Gschwender	MO Motul Racing Team	RG500	+2'53.270	
17	(Italy) Fabio Biliotti	Moto Club Condor	RS500	+2'55.070	
18	(Switzerland) Philippe Coulon	Marlboro-Suzuki	RG500	+2'57.960	
19	(Netherlands) Rinus van Kasteren		RG500	+1 lap	
20	(Denmark) Børge Nielsen		RG500	+1 lap	
21	(Austria) Franz Kaserer		RG500	+1 lap	
22	(Netherlands) Johan van Eijk		RG500	+1 lap	
Ret	(United Kingdom) Keith Huewen	Heron-Suzuki	RG500	Retired	
Ret	(United Kingdom) Barry Sheene	Heron-Suzuki	RG500	Retired	
Ret	(France) Franck Gross		RG500	Retired	
Ret	(Sweden) Peter Sjöström	Jeb’s Helmet Sweden	RG500	Retired	
Ret	(New Zealand) Dennis Ireland		RG500	Retired	
Ret	(Switzerland) Wolfgang von Muralt		RG500	Retired	
Ret	(Switzerland) Sergio Pellandini	Carimati-Pezzani Racing	RG500	Retired	
Ret	(South Africa) Jon Ekerold	Cagiva	GP500	Retired	
Ret	(Italy) Marco Lucchinelli	HRC-Honda	NS500	Retired	
Ret	(United Kingdom) Roger Marshall	Honda Britain Racing	RS500	Retired	
Ret	(Italy) Franco Uncini	HB Gallina-Suzuki	RG500	Retired	
Ret	(United Kingdom) Steve Parrish	Mitsui-Yamaha	YZR500	Retired	
Ret	(Australia) Wayne Gardner	Honda Britain Racing	RS500	Retired	
Ret	(United Kingdom) Chris Guy		RG500	Retired	

Previous race: 1983 Yugoslavian Grand Prix	FIM Grand Prix World Championship; 1983 season	Next race: 1983 Belgian Grand Prix
Previous race: 1982 Dutch TT	Dutch TT	Next race: 1984 Dutch TT
