= Marc Fontan =

French motorcycle racer

- Nationality: French
Motorcycle racing career statistics
Grand Prix motorcycle racing
Active years	1978, 1981 - 1983
First race	1978 250cc British Grand Prix
Last race	1983 500cc San Marino Grand Prix
Team	Gauloises-Yamaha
Starts / Wins / Podiums / Poles / F. laps / Points; 32 / 0 / 0 / 0 / 0 / 119

Marc Fontan (born 20 October 1956) is a French former professional motorcycle racer. He competed in the Grand Prix road racing world championships from 1978 to 1983.

Fontan was born in Canet-en-Roussillon in the French department of Pyrénées-Orientales. He began to race motorcycles in 1977, and competed in his first world championship race riding a Yamaha TZ250 at the 1978 250cc British Grand Prix. He also placed seventh at the 1978 Bol d'Or 24 hour endurance race.

Fontan joined the French Japauto Honda team and won the 1980 24 Hours of Le Mans with teammate Herve Moineau. They went on to win the 1980 FIM Endurance World Championship. In 1981 he began competing in the premier 500cc Grand Prix world championship as a member of the French Yamaha importer's Sonauto team. He was crowned French champion in October 1981, and the following weekend took part in the final round of the British championship at Brands Hatch, however he came off his bike at Druids while in sixth position. His best year was in 1983, where he finished in sixth place in the 500cc world championship.

Fontan's career ended after a serious arm injury at the 1984 24 Hours of Le Mans left him with nerve damage.

Today, Fontan is known for being the principal architect of the Moto-Tour, a seven-day competitive rally that crosses huge swaths of France.

== Motorcycle Grand Prix results ==
**Position**	1	2	3	4	5	6	7	8	9	10
**Points**	15	12	10	8	6	5	4	3	2	1

(key) (Races in bold indicate pole position; races in italics indicate fastest lap)

Year	Class	Team	1	2	3	4	5	6	7	8	9	10	11	12	Points	Rank	Wins
1978	250cc	Yamaha	VEN -	ESP -	FRA -	NAT -	NED -	BEL -	SWE -	FIN -	GBR; 10	GER -	CZE -	YUG -	1	28th	0
1981	500cc	Sonauto-Yamaha	AUT; 12	GER; 9	NAT; NC	FRA; 10	YUG; NC	NED; 13	BEL; 8	RSM; 8	GBR; 5	FIN; 6	SWE; 6		25	9th	0
1982	500cc	Sonauto-Yamaha	ARG; 7	AUT -	FRA -	ESP; 7	NAT; 9	NED; 9	BEL; 10	YUG -	GBR; 8	SWE; 4	RSM -	GER; 6	29	10th	0
1983	500cc	Sonauto-Yamaha	RSA; 4	FRA; 6	NAT; 7	GER; 6	ESP; 7	AUT; 6	YUG; 6	NED; 7	BEL; 6	GBR; 5	SWE; 4	RSM; 6	64	6th	0

=== FIM Endurance World Championship ===
Year	Bike	Rider	TC
1980	Honda	(France) Marc Fontan (France) Hervé Moineau	1st
