= Graziano Rossi =

Italian motorcycle racer (born 1954)

- Nationality: Italian
- Born: 14 March 1954 (age 72); Pesaro, Italy
Motorcycle racing career statistics
Grand Prix motorcycle racing
| Active years | 1977–1982 |
| First race | 1977 500cc Nations Grand Prix |
| Last race | 1982 500cc San Marino Grand Prix |
| First win | 1979 250cc Yugoslavian Grand Prix |
| Last win | 1979 250cc Swedish Grand Prix |
| Team(s) | Morbidelli, Suzuki, Yamaha |
Starts / Wins / Podiums / Poles / F. laps / Points; 20 / 3 / 7 / 1 / 0 / 114

Graziano Rossi (born 14 March 1954 in Pesaro) is an Italian former Grand Prix motorcycle road racer. He is the father of nine-time motorcycle World Champion Valentino Rossi.

Rossi began racing in the World Championship in 1977 riding a Suzuki in the 500cc class. He had his best year in the 1979 when he earned three victories and five podiums in the 250 class aboard a Morbidelli, finishing third in points. He then raced in Touring cars from 1989 to 1993.

== Racing results ==
=== Career summary ===
| Season | Series | Team | Races | Wins | Poles | F/laps | Podiums | Points | Position |
|---|---|---|---|---|---|---|---|---|---|
| 1977 | Grand Prix motorcycle racing - 500cc Championship | | 1 | 0 | 0 | 0 | 0 | 0 | NC |
| 1978 | Grand Prix motorcycle racing - 500cc Championship | Team Gallina Nava Olio Fiat | 2 | 0 | 0 | 0 | 0 | 27 | 16th |
| 1979 | Grand Prix motorcycle racing - 250cc Championship | Morbidelli | 5 | 3 | 0 | 0 | 5 | 67 | **3rd** |
| 1979 | Grand Prix motorcycle racing - 500cc Championship | Morbidelli | 2 | 0 | 0 | 0 | 0 | 2 | 31st |
| 1980 | Grand Prix motorcycle racing - 500cc Championship | Team Nava Olio Fiat | 7 | 0 | 1 | 0 | 2 | 38 | 5th |
| 1981 | Grand Prix motorcycle racing - 500cc Championship | Morbidelli | 2 | 0 | 0 | 0 | 0 | 0 | NC |
| 1982 | Grand Prix motorcycle racing - 500cc Championship | Marlboro Agostini Yamaha | 4 | 0 | 0 | 0 | 0 | 0 | NC |
| 1992 | Italian Superturismo Championship - S2 | Castelfranco Racing | 12 | 0 | N/A | N/A | 1 | 61 | 9th |
| 1993 | Italian Superturismo Championship - Privateer | Trivellato Racing | 10 | 2 | N/A | N/A | 9 | 140 | **2nd** |

=== Motorcycle Grand Prix results ===
| **Position** | 1 | 2 | 3 | 4 | 5 | 6 | 7 | 8 | 9 | 10 |
| **Points** | 15 | 12 | 10 | 8 | 6 | 5 | 4 | 3 | 2 | 1 |

(key) (Races in bold indicate pole position; races in italics indicate fastest lap)

| Year | Class | Team | 1 | 2 | 3 | 4 | 5 | 6 | 7 | 8 | 9 | 10 | 11 | 12 | 13 | Points | Rank | Wins |
|---|---|---|---|---|---|---|---|---|---|---|---|---|---|---|---|---|---|---|
| 1977 | 500cc | Suzuki | VEN – | AUT – | GER – | NAT; 13 | FRA – | NED – | BEL – | SWE – | FIN – | CZE – | GBR – | | | 0 | — | 0 |
| 1978 | 500cc | Suzuki | VEN – | ESP – | AUT – | FRA; 6 | NAT – | NED – | BEL – | SWE – | FIN; 9 | GBR – | GER – | | | 7 | 16th | 0 |
| 1979 | 250cc | Morbidelli | VEN – | | GER – | NAT – | ESP; 3 | YUG; 1 | NED; 1 | BEL – | SWE; 1 | FIN – | GBR – | CZE; 2 | FRA – | 67 | 3rd | 3 |
| 1979 | 500cc | Suzuki | VEN – | AUT – | GER – | NAT; 9 | ESP – | YUG – | NED; 12 | BEL – | SWE – | FIN – | GBR – | | FRA – | 2 | 31st | 0 |
| 1980 | 500cc | Suzuki | NAT; 3 | ESP; NC | FRA; 4 | NED; 2 | BEL; NC | **FIN**; NC | GBR; 4 | GER – | | | | | | 38 | 5th | 0 |
| 1981 | 500cc | Suzuki | AUT – | GER – | NAT – | FRA – | YUG – | NED – | BEL – | RSM – | GBR; 11 | FIN – | SWE; 11 | | | 0 | — | 0 |
| 1982 | 500cc | Yamaha | ARG; 13 | AUT; 14 | FRA – | ESP – | NAT – | NED; 13 | BEL – | YUG – | GBR – | SWE – | RSM; 11 | GER – | | 0 | — | 0 |

=== Complete Italian Superturismo Championship results ===
| Year | Team | Car | Class | 1 | 2 | 3 | 4 | 5 | 6 | 7 | 8 | 9 | 10 | 11 | 12 | 13 | 14 | 15 | 16 | 17 | 18 | 19 | 20 | DC | Pts |
|---|---|---|---|---|---|---|---|---|---|---|---|---|---|---|---|---|---|---|---|---|---|---|---|---|---|
| 1992 | Castelfranco Racing | BMW M3 | S2 | MNZ; 1 | MNZ; 2 | MAG; 1 | MAG; 2 | MUG; 1; 4 | MUG; 2; 3 | BIN; 1; 13 | BIN; 2; 7 | VAL; 1; 4 | VAL; 2; 6 | IMO; 1 Ret | IMO; 2; 5 | MIS; 1 | MIS; 2 | PER; 1 | PER; 2 | VAR; 1; 8 | VAR; 2; 9 | MNZ; 1; 6 | MNZ; 2 Ret | 9th | 61 |
| 1993 | Trivellato Racing | Vauxhall Cavalier | Privateer | MNZ; 1; 2 | MNZ; 2 | VAL; 1; 1 | VAL; 2; 1 | MIS; 1; 2 | MIS; 2; 2 | MAG; 1; 3 | MAG; 2 | BIN; 1 | BIN; 2 | IMO; 1 | IMO; 2 | VAR; 1; 3 | VAR; 2; 3 | MIS; 1; 2 | MIS; 2; 7 | PER; 1 | PER; 2 | MUG; 1 | MUG; 2 | 2nd | 140 |
