= 1983 Belgian motorcycle Grand Prix =

Edition of the Belgian motorcycle Grand Prix

(Belgium) 1983 Belgian Grand Prix
Race details
- Race 9 of 12 races in the 1983 Grand Prix motorcycle racing season
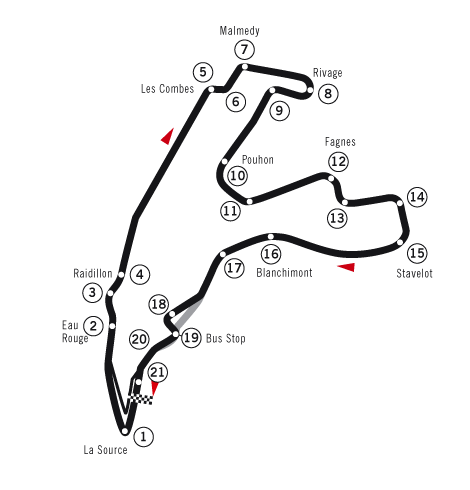
- Date: 3 July 1983
- Official name: Johnson GP of Belgium
- Location: Circuit de Spa-Francorchamps
- Course: Permanent racing facility; 6.940 km (4.312 mi)

500cc
Pole position
- Rider: (United States) Freddie Spencer
- Time: 2:32.700
Fastest lap
- Rider: (United States) Kenny Roberts
- Time: 2:32.420
Podium
- First: (United States) Kenny Roberts
- Second: (United States) Freddie Spencer
- Third: (United States) Randy Mamola

250cc
Pole position
- Rider: (Belgium) Didier de Radiguès
- Time: 2:40.720
Fastest lap
- Rider: (France) Christian Sarron
- Time: 2:40.860
Podium
- First: (Belgium) Didier de Radiguès
- Second: (France) Christian Sarron
- Third: (Venezuela) Carlos Lavado

125cc
Pole position
- Rider: (Italy) Pier Paolo Bianchi
- Time: 2:45.670
Fastest lap
- Rider: (Italy) Eugenio Lazzarini
- Time: 2:47.560
Podium
- First: (Italy) Eugenio Lazzarini
- Second: (Spain) Ángel Nieto
- Third: (Spain) Ricardo Tormo

50cc
Pole position
- Rider: No 50cc race was held
Fastest lap
- Rider: No 50cc race was held
Podium
- First: No 50cc race was held
- Second: No 50cc race was held
- Third: No 50cc race was held

The 1983 Belgian motorcycle Grand Prix was the ninth round of the 1983 Grand Prix motorcycle racing season. It took place on the weekend of 1–3 July 1983 at the Circuit de Spa-Francorchamps.

== Classification ==
=== 500 cc ===
Pos.	Rider	Team	Machine	Time/Retired	Points
1	(United States) Kenny Roberts	Marlboro Agostini-Yamaha	YZR500	51'20.880	15
2	(United States) Freddie Spencer	HRC-Honda	NS500	+13.900	12
3	(United States) Randy Mamola	HB Sinclair-Suzuki	RG500	+35.130	10
4	(Japan) Takazumi Katayama	HRC-Honda	NS500	+37.620	8
5	(United States) Eddie Lawson	Marlboro Agostini Yamaha	YZR500	+45.500	6
6	(France) Marc Fontan	Sonauto Gauloises-Yamaha	YZR500	+1'07.730	5
7	(Italy) Marco Lucchinelli	HRC-Honda	NS500	+1'13.430	4
8	(United Kingdom) Ron Haslam	HRC-Honda	NS500	+1'29.490	3
9	(Netherlands) Boet van Dulmen	Shell Nederland-Suzuki	RG500	+1'40.550	2
10	(Switzerland) Sergio Pellandini	Carimati-Pezzani Racing	RG500	+1'46.900	1
11	(United Kingdom) Keith Huewen	Heron-Suzuki	RG500	+2'14.630	
12	(United Kingdom) Mark Salle		RG500	+2'22.930	
13	(Finland) Eero Hyvärinen		RG500	+2'23.170	
14	(France) Franck Gross		RS500	+1 lap	
15	(Switzerland) Wolfgang von Muralt		RG500	+1 lap	
16	(New Zealand) Stuart Avant		RG500	+1 lap	
17	(West Germany) Ernst Gschwender	MO Motul Racing Team	RG500	+1 lap	
18	(Netherlands) Rob Punt	M Woestenburg	RG500	+1 lap	
19	(Switzerland) Peter Huber		RG500	+1 lap	
20	(Denmark) Børge Nielsen		RG500	+1 lap	
21	(New Zealand) Dennis Ireland		RG500	+1 lap	
22	(Netherlands) Johan van Eijk		RG500	+2 laps	
23	(Belgium) Jean-Philippe Delers		YZR500	+2 laps	
Ret	(Republic of Ireland) Con Law		RG500	Retired	
Ret	(Switzerland) Philippe Coulon	Marlboro-Suzuki	RG500	Retired	
Ret	(United Kingdom) Chris Guy		RG500	Retired	
Ret	(Sweden) Peter Sjöström	Jeb's Helmet Sweden	RG500	Retired	
Ret	(Netherlands) Jack Middelburg	Stichting Ned-Honda	RS500	Retired	
Ret	(Norway) Beni Slydal		RG500	Retired	
Ret	(Austria) Franz Kaserer		RG500	Retired	
Ret	(Belgium) Bernard Denis		RG500	Retired	
Ret	(Belgium) Didier de Radiguès	Team Johnson Elf	RS500	Retired	
DNS	(United Kingdom) Barry Sheene	Heron-Suzuki	RG500	Did not start	
DNS	(United Kingdom) Norman Brown	Hector Neill Racing	RG500	Did not start	
DNS	(Italy) Fabio Biliotti	Moto Club Condor	RS500	Did not start	
DNS	(France) Raymond Roche	Moto Club Paul Ricard	NS500	Did not start	
DNS	(West Germany) Markus Ober		RG500	Did not start	
DNS	(France) Jean Lafond		RS500	Did not start	
DNS	(United Kingdom) Steve Parrish	Mitsui-Yamaha	YZR500	Did not start	

Previous race: 1983 Dutch TT	FIM Grand Prix World Championship; 1983 season	Next race: 1983 British Grand Prix
Previous race: 1982 Belgian Grand Prix	Belgian Grand Prix	Next race: 1984 Belgian Grand Prix
