= Roberto Gallina =

Italian motorcycle racer (born 1940)

- Nationality: Italian
- Born: 4 January 1940 (age 86); La Spezia, Italy
Motorcycle racing career statistics
Grand Prix motorcycle racing
Active years	1970, 1972 - 1974
First race	1970 500cc Nations Grand Prix
Last race	1974 500cc Nations Grand Prix
Team	Paton
Starts / Wins / Podiums / Poles / F. laps / Points; 12 / 0 / 3 / 0 / 0 / 74

Roberto Gallina (born 4 January 1940 in La Spezia) is an Italian former Grand Prix motorcycle road racer and racing team owner. His best year was in 1973 when he finished eighth in the 250cc world championship. After his racing career ended, he started his own racing team, which proved to be a successful venture. His team won two 500cc world championships as a team owner in 1981 and 1982 with riders Marco Lucchinelli and Franco Uncini.

Gallina was also involved in designing his own bike, intended for the World Superbike championship, with the help of Japanese investor Yoshiyuki Hayashi. The bike, called the Gallina Quattro 750, had a custom frame and design and was developed around a heavily modified Suzuki GSX-R750 engine (converted to chain gear drive and with most parts re-cast in magnesium). The bursting of the Japanese asset bubble hurt Hayashi severely and in the end only ten examples were built, at an overall cost of $2.5 million. Gallina's own finances never recovered.

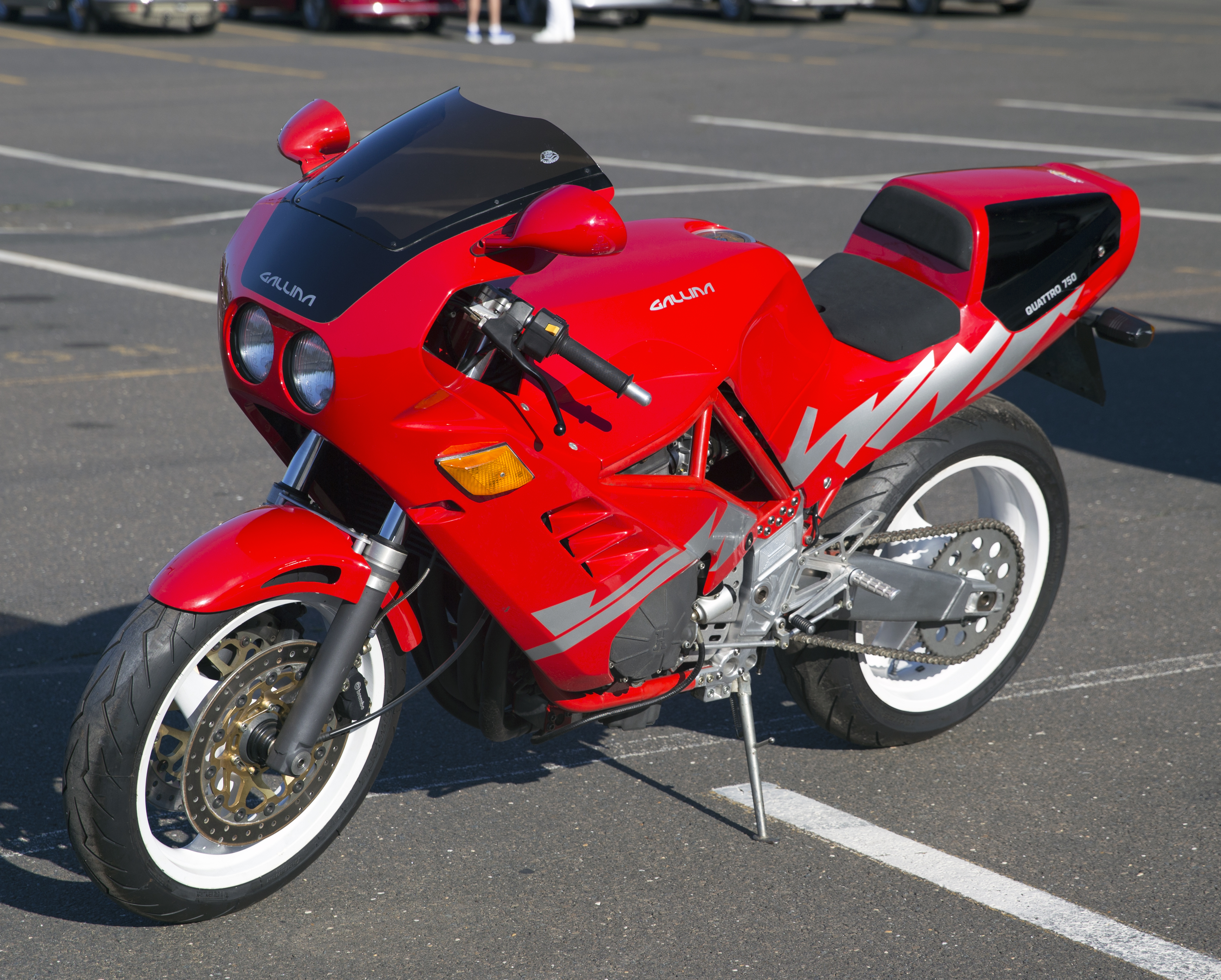
One of the ten Gallina Quattro 750 built
