= Gianni Pelletier =

Italian motorcycle racer

Giovanni Pelletier
- Nationality: Italian
- Born: 11 August 1954 (age 72); Rome, Italy

Giovanni "Gianni" Pelletier is an Italian former professional Grand Prix motorcycle racer.

== Career statistics ==
=== By season ===
Season	Class	Motorcycle	Race	Win	Podium	Pole	FLap	Pts	Plcd
1978	350cc	Yamaha	1	0	0	0	0	2	23rd
1979	500cc	Suzuki	2	0	0	0	0	1	35th
1981	500cc	Suzuki	3	0	0	0	0	8	16th
1982	500cc	Morbidelli	2	0	0	0	0	0	NC
1983	500cc	Honda	5	0	0	0	0	3	16th
Total			13	0	0	0	0	14	
