= Michel Frutschi =

Swiss motorcycle racer

- Nationality: (Switzerland) Swiss
- Born: 6 January 1953; Geneva, Switzerland
- Died: 3 April 1983 (aged 30); Le Mans, France
Motorcycle racing career statistics
Grand Prix motorcycle racing
Active years	1977, 1979 - 1983
First race	1977 350cc British Grand Prix
Last race	1983 500cc French Grand Prix
First win	1982 500cc French Grand Prix
Last win	1982 500cc French Grand Prix
Starts / Wins / Podiums / Poles / F. laps / Points; 17 / 1 / 3 / 0 / 1 / 76

Michel Frutschi (6 January 1953 – 3 April 1983) was a Swiss professional Grand Prix motorcycle road racer. He competed in Grand Prix motorcycle racing between 1977 and 1983.

Frutschi's best year was 1979, when he finished in fifth place in the 350cc world championship and second in the Formula 750 championship. In the 1982 500cc world championship, he won the 500cc French Grand Prix, a race boycotted by all factory riders, taking Sanvenero's first and only 500cc victory in the process. Frutschi was killed while competing in the 1983 500cc French Grand Prix at Le Mans.
