= Leandro Becheroni =

Italian motorcycle road racer (1950–2023)

- Born: 13 July 1950; Calenzano, Italy
- Died: 30 March 2023 (aged 72); Calenzano, Italy
- Occupation: Psychiatrist

Leandro Becheroni (13 July 1950 – 30 March 2023) was an Italian Grand Prix motorcycle road racer.

== Life and career ==
Born in Calenzano, Becheroni had his breakout in 1977, when he won the 500cc Italian Junior Championship with a Bimota SB1. The following year, he made his debut in the Grand Prix motorcycle racing, placing seventh in the Venezuelan Grand Prix. He competed in the World Championship Grand Prix until 1987, and besides that, in 1979, he won the 750cc Italian Speed Championship, in 1981, he won the 500cc Grand Prix European Championship, and in 1983, he won the 500cc Italian Speed Championship.

After his retirement in 1989, Becheroni opened a restaurant, "Gli Alberi" ('The Trees'), which became a meeting place for MotoGP racers and fans. He was found dead of a heart attack at his restaurant on 30 March 2023, at the age of 72.
