= Guido Paci =

Italian motorcycle racer (1949–1983)

- Nationality: Italian
- Born: December 27, 1949; Servigliano, Italy
- Died: April 10, 1983 (aged 33); Autodromo Enzo e Dino Ferrari, Imola, Italy
Motorcycle racing career statistics
Grand Prix motorcycle racing
Active years	1980 - 1983
First race	1980 500cc Nations Grand Prix
Last race	1983 500cc French Grand Prix
Team(s)	Suzuki, Yamaha, Honda
Starts / Wins / Podiums / Poles / F. laps / Points; 19 / 0 / 0 / 0 / 0 / 24

Guido Paci (December 27, 1949 - April 10, 1983) was an Italian professional Grand Prix motorcycle road racer. He competed in the 500cc class from 1980 until his death. His best finish to a season was in 1981 when he finished in 11th position in the standings.

Paci was participating in a motorcycle endurance race at Imola in 1983 when he lost control of his bike at full speed, hitting straw bales stacked against a concrete wall at what is now called the Villeneuve chicane. He was still alive when medical crews quickly rushed to his aid, but eventually died of critical head and chest injuries. He was 33 years old.
