= Philippe Coulon =

Swiss motorcycle racer

- Nationality: (Switzerland) Swiss
- Born: 27 February 1950 (age 76)
Motorcycle racing career statistics
Grand Prix motorcycle racing
Active years	1973 - 1983
First race	1973 350cc Spanish Grand Prix
Last race	1983 500cc San Marino Grand Prix
Starts / Wins / Podiums / Poles / F. laps / Points; 54 / 0 / 2 / 1 / 0 / 138

Philippe Coulon (born 27 February 1950) is a Swiss former Grand Prix motorcycle road racer from Switzerland. His best year was in 1976 when he finished in sixth place in the 500cc world championship.
