= Éric Saul =

French motorcycle racer

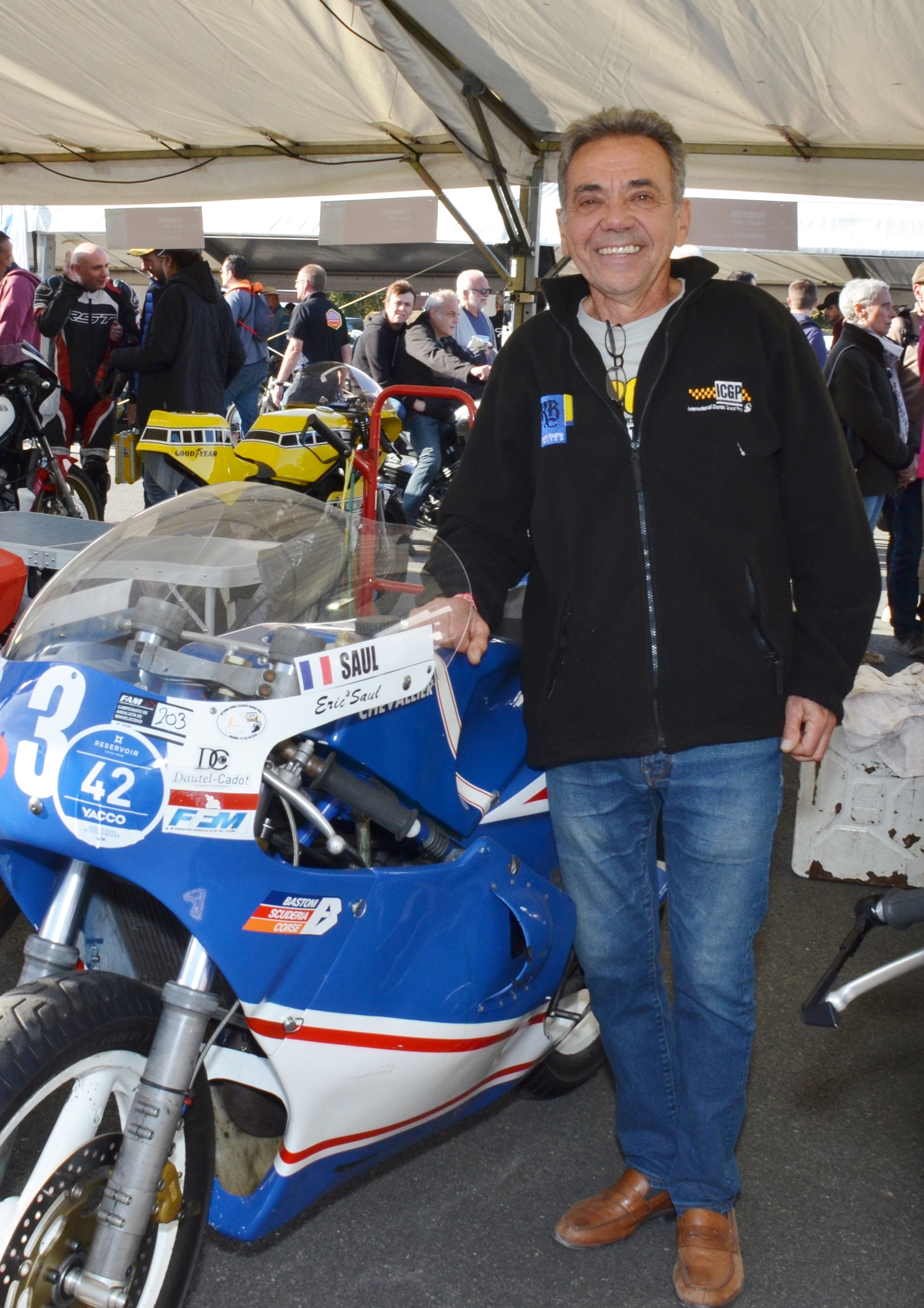
- Saul at the 1979 French Grand Prix
- Nationality: French
Motorcycle racing career statistics
Grand Prix motorcycle racing
Active years	1977 - 1983, 1986
First race	1977 250cc British Grand Prix
Last race	1986 125cc Austrian Grand Prix
First win	1981 250cc Nations Grand Prix
Last win	1982 350cc Austrian Grand Prix
Team	Chevallier
Starts / Wins / Podiums / Poles / F. laps / Points; 30 / 2 / 8 / 1 / 1 / 172

Éric Saul (born 26 May 1954) is a French former Grand Prix motorcycle road racer.

== Career ==
Saul began motorcycle competition in 1973. That year he entered the last round of the "coupe des 4 saisons" challenge in Magny Cours on an unmodified Yamaha 125 AS3 and finished 15th. His result convinced him to pursue a racing career. In 1974, he started with the "coupe des 4 saisons" challenge and won both rounds in the 125cc class on a Yamaha AS3 and in the 500cc class on Kawasaki even though it was his first time on the Croix-en-Thernois circuit. Also in 1974, he competed in the Kawasaki Cup Challenge and finished 11th.

Saul competed in the Grand Prix world championship from 1977 to 1983 and then returned to compete in 1986. His best result was a fourth-place finish in the 1982 350cc world championship. Saul won two Grand Prix races during his career at the 1981 250cc Nations Grand Prix and the 1982 350cc Austrian Grand Prix.

After his racing career ended, Saul created the International Classic Grand Prix organization promoting meetings of classic Grand Prix bikes and racers from the 1970s and 1980s.

== Results ==
Kawasaki Cup

Rank	Name	Points	6 Res	Lem	Dij	Cha	Mag	Lem	Mry	Léd	Kar
1	Saul, Éric	81	79	15+3	8	12	1	1	15	8	15+3
2	Boulom, Denis	72	71	dsq	15	15+3	15	10	1	1	12
3	Sarron, Christian	62	61	-	1	8	10	15+3	1+3	15	6

== Grand Prix career statistics ==
Points system from 1969 to 1987:

Position	1	2	3	4	5	6	7	8	9	10
Points	15	12	10	8	6	5	4	3	2	1

(key) (Races in bold indicate pole position; races in italics indicate fastest lap)

Year	Class	Team	Machine	1	2	3	4	5	6	7	8	9	10	11	12	13	14	Points	Rank	Wins
1977	250cc	Yamaha	TZ250	VEN -	GER -	NAT -	ESP -	FRA -	YUG -	NED -	BEL -	SWE -	FIN -	CZE -	GBR; 3			10	20th	0
1978	350cc	Yamaha	TZ350	VEN; 7	AUT -	FRA -	NAT -	NED -	SWE -	FIN -	GBR -	GER -	CZE -	YUG -				4	20th	0
1979	250cc	Yamaha	TZ250	VEN; 6		GER -	NAT -	ESP -	YUG; 9	NED -	BEL -	SWE -	FIN -	GBR -	CZE -	FRA; 7		11	18th	0
1979	350cc	Yamaha	TZ350	VEN; 7	AUT -	GER -	NAT -	ESP -	YUG -	NED -			FIN -	GBR -	CZE; 5	FRA -		10	16th	0
1980	250cc	Yamaha	TZ250	NAT; 5	ESP -	FRA; 5	YUG -	NED; 2	BEL -	FIN -	GBR -	CZE -	GER -					24	9th	0
1980	350cc	Yamaha	TZ350	NAT; 7		FRA; 3		NED -			GBR; 3	CZE -	GER -					24	6th	0
1981	250cc	Yamaha	TZ250	ARG; 7		GER -	NAT; 1	FRA -	ESP -		NED -	BEL -	RSM -	GBR -	FIN -	SWE -	CZE -	19	13th	1
1981	350cc	Yamaha	TZ350	ARG -	AUT -	GER; 2	NAT; 5			YUG -	NED -			GBR -			CZE -	18	9th	0
1982	350cc	Chevallier-Yamaha	TZ350	ARG; 4	AUT; 1	FRA -	NAT; 6	NED; 7	GBR -	FIN; 7	CZE; 5	GER; 3						52	4th	1
1983	250cc	Yamaha	TZ250	RSA -	FRA -	NAT; NC	GER -	ESP -	AUT -	YUG -	NED -	BEL; NC	GBR; 29	SWE -				0	-	0
1986	125cc	LGM	-	ESP; NC	NAT; NC	GER -	AUT; 21	NED -	BEL -	FRA -	GBR -	SWE -	RSM -	BWU -				0	-	0
