= Ricardo Tormo =

Spanish motorcycle racer (1952–1998)

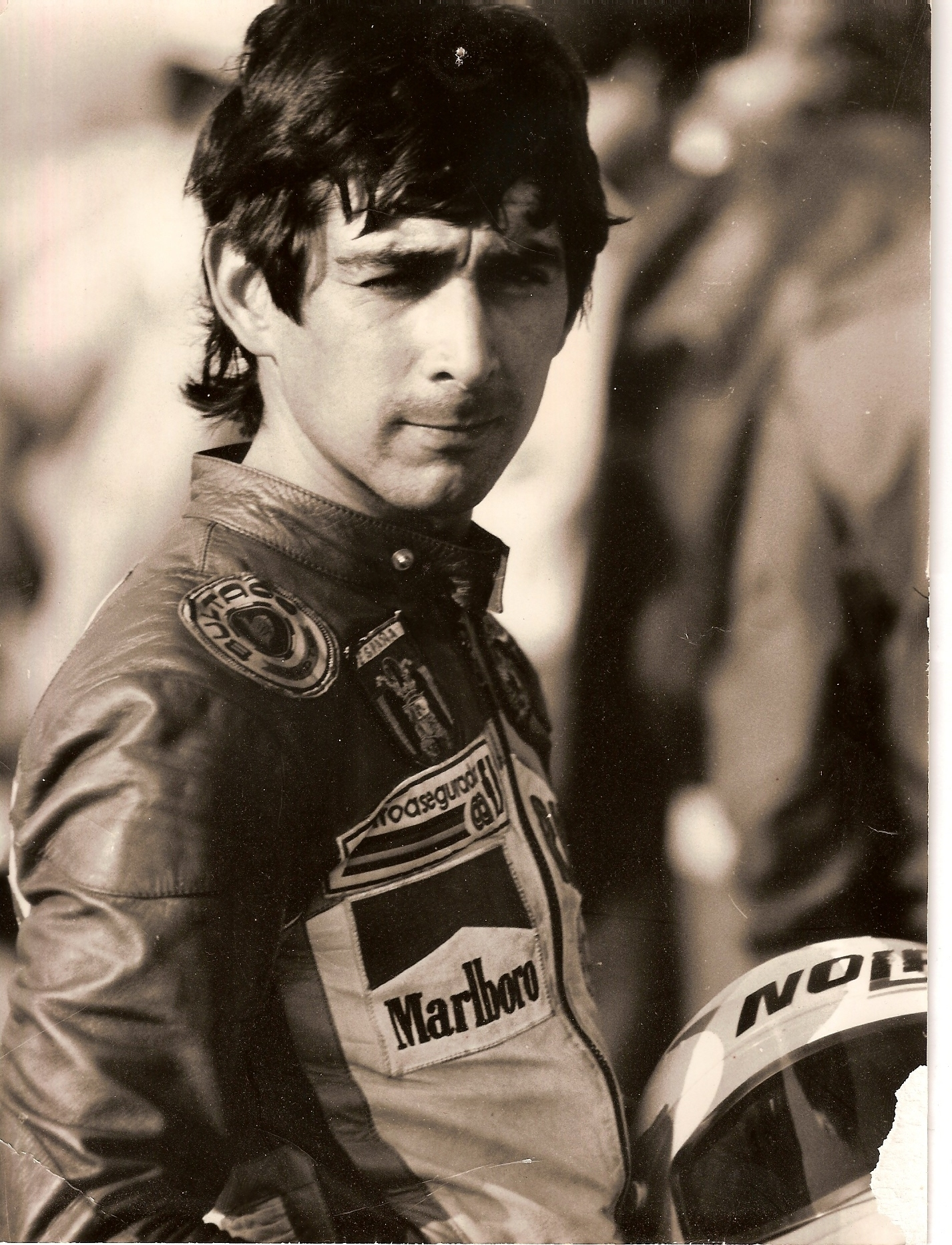
- Nationality: Spanish
- Born: 7 September 1952; Canals, Valencia, Spain
- Died: 27 December 1998 (aged 46); Valencia, Spain
Motorcycle racing career statistics
Grand Prix motorcycle racing
| Active years | 1973 - 1984 |
| First race | 1973 50cc Spanish Grand Prix |
| Last race | 1984 80cc Nations Grand Prix |
| First win | 1977 50cc Swedish Grand Prix |
| Last win | 1983 50cc San Marino Grand Prix |
| Team(s) | Bultaco, Derbi, Kreidler |
| Championships | 50cc - 1978, 1981 |
Starts / Wins / Podiums / Poles / F. laps / Points; 87 / 19 / 36 / 23 / 4 / 564

Ricardo Tormo Blaya (7 September 1952 – 27 December 1998) was a Spanish professional motorcycle road racer. He competed in Grand Prix motorcycle racing from 1973 to 1984, most prominently as a two-time 50cc world champion riding Bultaco motorcycles. The Circuit de Valencia race track was renamed Circuit de la Comunitat Valenciana Ricardo Tormo in his honor.

== Biography ==
Tormo was born in the village of Alacor in the municipality of Canals in the Spanish province of Valencia. When he was eight, his family moved into the center of Canals. Tormo won the 1978 FIM 50cc world championship as a member of the Bultaco factory racing team. He repeated as 50cc world champion in 1981 on a privately backed Bultaco. He was also a three-time 50cc Spanish national champion and a four-time 125cc national champion. His career was closely linked to that of Ángel Nieto, who was both a teammate and rival of Tormo.

In 1983, together with Jorge “Aspar” Martínez, Tormo signed with the Derbi factory to compete for the 1984 world championship in the new 80cc category. Tormo suffered an engine failure at the first race of the year at Misano. The second race of the season was to be held at Spain's Jarama Circuit.

At that time, there were only two official circuits in Spain, one in Jarama and the other in Calafat. The team planned test rides before the race, but both circuits were already booked, forcing them to practice in Martorelles. This region of Barcelona was an industrial park near the Derbi factory. The team occasionally had test runs in this area, blocking off the roads to ensure that no cars would interfere with the racers. However, during a practice prior to the Spanish Grand Prix, a vehicle gained access to the area from one of the team's assistants who was supposed to have blocked off all of the roads. Subsequently, Tormo, who was testing a new racing suit, hit the car and shattered his right leg. The accident marked the end of his racing career and the beginning of a countless series of surgeries.

In 1994, Tormo received Valencia's highest honor when he was given the Valencian Community's High Distinction award. In collaboration with the journalist Paco Desamparados, an autobiography was published, entitled "Yo Ricardo. Una vida por y para la moto". (I am Ricardo. A life by and for motorcycles).

On 27 December 1998, Tormo died from leukemia, which he had been battling for many years. In his honor, Valencia's racetrack was renamed the Circuit de la Comunitat Valenciana Ricardo Tormo.

== Images ==
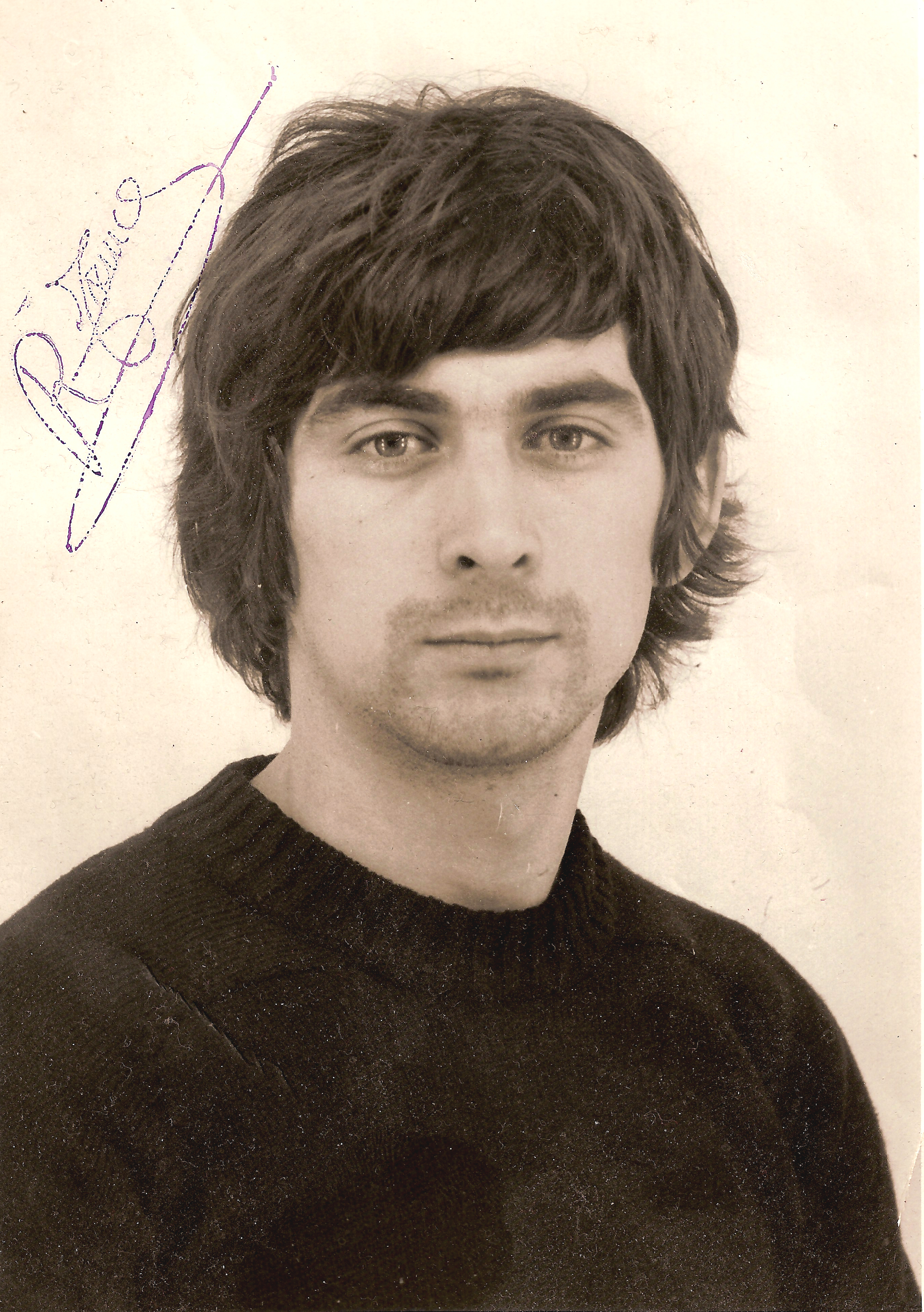

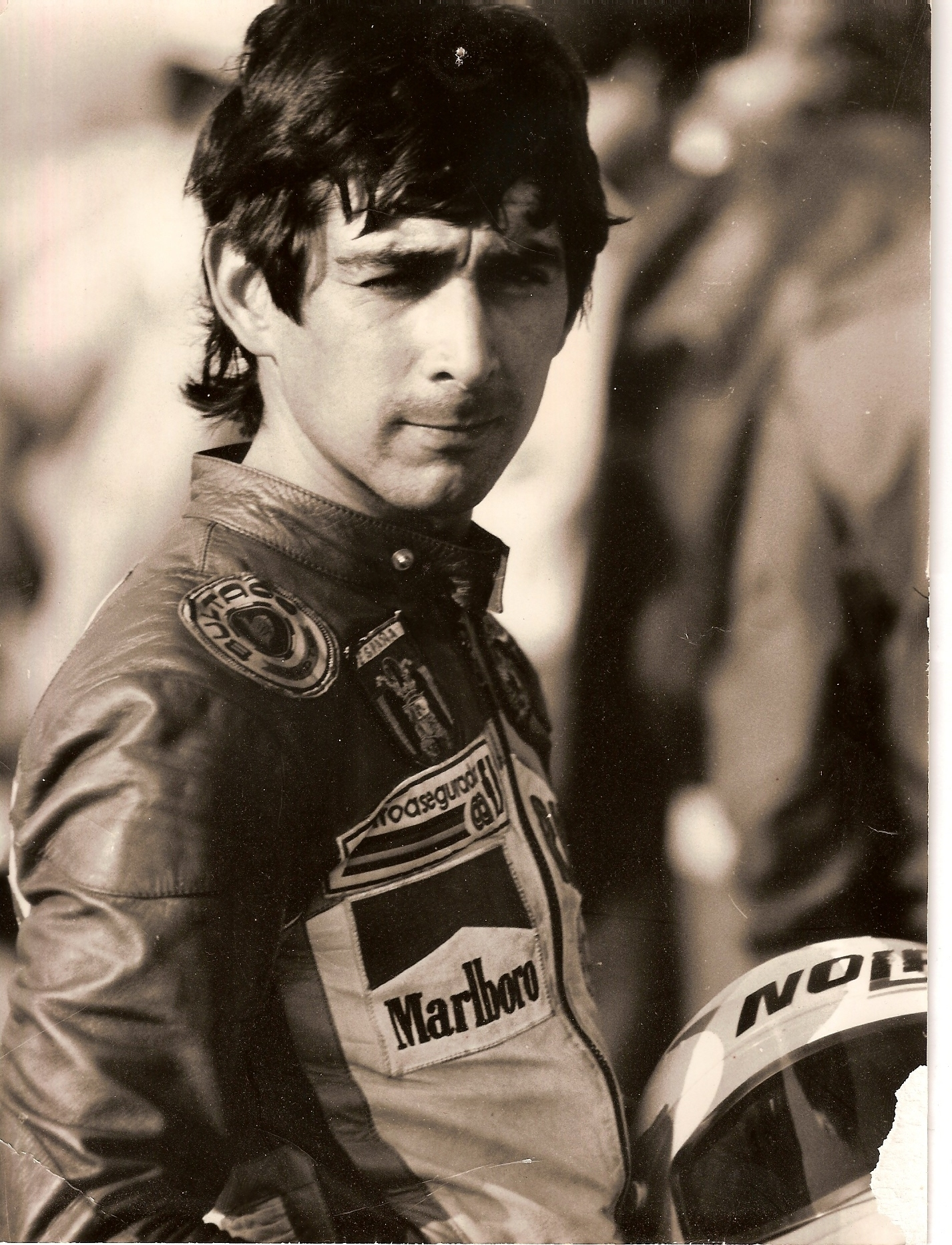

== Complete Grand Prix motorcycle racing results ==
Points system from 1969 to 1987:

| **Position** | 1 | 2 | 3 | 4 | 5 | 6 | 7 | 8 | 9 | 10 |
| **Points** | 15 | 12 | 10 | 8 | 6 | 5 | 4 | 3 | 2 | 1 |

(key) (Races in bold indicate pole position; races in italics indicate fastest lap)

| Year | Class | Bike | 1 | 2 | 3 | 4 | 5 | 6 | 7 | 8 | 9 | 10 | 11 | 12 | 13 | 14 | Pos | Pts | Wins |
|---|---|---|---|---|---|---|---|---|---|---|---|---|---|---|---|---|---|---|---|
| 1973 | 50cc | Derbi | GER - | NAT - | YUG - | NED - | BEL - | SWE - | ESP; 10 | | | | | | | | 28th | 1 | 0 |
| 1976 | 50cc | Kreidler | FRA - | NAT - | NED - | BEL - | SWE - | FIN - | GER - | ESP; 6 | | | | | | | 19th | 5 | 0 |
| 1977 | 50cc | Bultaco | GER; 11 | NAT; 2 | ESP; 3 | YUG; 2 | NED; 2 | BEL; 4 | SWE; 1 | | | | | | | | **3rd** | **69** | **1** |
| 1978 | 50cc | Bultaco | | ESP; 2 | | | **NAT**; 1 | NED; 2 | **BEL**; 1 | | | | **GER**; 1 | **CZE**; 1 | YUG; 1 | | **1st** | **99** | **5** |
| 1978 | 125cc | Bultaco | VEN - | ESP - | AUT; 10 | FRA; Ret | NAT - | NED - | BEL - | SWE - | FIN - | GBR - | GER - | | YUG - | | 30th | 1 | 0 |
| 1979 | 50cc | Bultaco | | | **GER**; Ret | NAT - | ESP - | YUG; 5 | **NED**; Ret | BEL - | | | | | **FRA**; Ret | | 17th | 6 | 0 |
| 1979 | 125cc | Bultaco | VEN - | AUT; NC | GER; Ret | NAT - | ESP - | **YUG**; Ret | NED; 2 | BEL - | SWE; Ret | FIN; 1 | GBR; 12 | CZE; Ret | FRA; 2 | | 7th | 39 | 1 |
| 1980 | 50cc | Kreidler Van Veen | NAT; Ret | **ESP**; 5 | | **YUG**; 1 | **NED**; 1 | **BEL**; Ret | | | | **GER**; Ret | | | | | 4th | 36 | 2 |
| 1980 | 125cc | MBA | NAT - | ESP; 5 | FRA - | YUG; Ret | NED; 6 | BEL; 9 | FIN - | GBR - | CZE - | GER; Ret | | | | | 12th | 13 | 0 |
| 1981 | 50cc | Motul Bultaco | | | GER; Ret | NAT; 1 | | **ESP**; 1 | YUG; 1 | NED; 1 | **BEL**; 1 | **RSM**; 1 | | | | CZE - | **1st** | **90** | **6** |
| 1981 | 125cc | Sanvenero | ARG; 12 | AUT - | GER; Ret | NAT - | FRA - | ESP; DNQ | YUG - | NED; 8 | | RSM; 4 | GBR; 9 | FIN; 4 | SWE; 1 | CZE - | 8th | 36 | 1 |
| 1982 | 50cc | Motul Bultaco | | | | ESP; Ret | NAT; 2 | NED; 3 | | YUG; 3 | | | | | RSM - | GER; 4 | 4th | 40 | 0 |
| 1982 | 125cc | Sanvenero | ARG; 2 | AUT; Ret | FRA; WD | ESP; 8 | NAT; Ret | NED; 5 | **BEL**; 1 | YUG; Ret | GBR; 2 | **SWE**; Ret | FIN; Ret | CZE; 3 | | | 5th | 52 | 1 |
| 1983 | 50cc | Garelli | FRA - | NAT - | GER - | ESP - | | YUG; Ret | NED; 3 | | | | RSM; 1 | | | | 7th | 25 | 1 |
| 1983 | 125cc | MBA | **FRA**; 1 | NAT; 4 | GER; Ret | ESP; 10 | AUT; 11 | YUG; Ret | NED; 2 | BEL; 3 | **GBR**; Ret | **SWE**; 5 | **RSM**; Ret | | | | 5th | 52 | 1 |
| 1984 | 80cc | Derbi | **NAT**; Ret | ESP - | AUT - | GER - | YUG - | NED - | BEL - | RSM - | | | | | | | - | 0 | 0 |
