= Dave Potter (motorcyclist) =

English motorcycle racer

- Nationality: (United Kingdom) British
- Born: 27 July 1950; Hovingham, Yorkshire, England
- Died: 18 September 1981 (aged 31); Chester, Cheshire, England
Motorcycle racing career statistics
500cc World Championship
Active years	1976–1981
Manufacturers	Yamaha, Suzuki
Starts / Wins / Podiums / Poles / F. laps / Points; 15 / - / - / - / - / 7
British Superbike Championship
Active years	1972–1981
Manufacturers	Yamaha
Championships	2 (1979, 1980)
Isle of Man TT career
TTs contested	1 (1974 Senior TT)

David William Potter (27 July 1950 – 18 September 1981) was an English motorcycle racer who won the British Superbike Championship twice. Potter crashed during a race at Oulton Park on 31 August 1981 and suffered head injuries from which he died in hospital 17 days later.

== Biography ==
Potter, from Hovingham, Yorkshire, started racing in 1969 at the Croft Circuit on a BSA Gold Star. The "goldie" was outclassed and not competitive. In his fourth race the bike's oil pump shaft snapped and the engine seized. This caused Potter to crash and he broke his shoulder and hand.

Having been offered a job by Paul Dunstall, Potter moved to London working for Dunstall as a mechanic. He brought one of Dunstall's bike and had some success on it in clubman's races, winning at Brands Hatch and Snetterton. In 1971, Potter won Lydden Circuit's Lord of Lydden title. The next meeting was the Hutchinson 100 at Brands Hatch, where Potter won the Mick Andrew Trophy. Charlie Sanby crashed at the "Hutch" and was unable to ride for a few weeks due to a suspected broken collarbone, leaving his team, Gus Kuhn, without a rider for Silverstone the next weekend. Potter phoned Vincent Davey of Kuhn and arrange to ride for them. On the Kuun Norton he had some wins during the season, culmination with a win at Snetterton in October which clinched the Bemsee (British Motorcycle Racing Club) Production Title for him.

Potter had some wins on the Khun Norton in 1972, culminating in a win at Silloth in the final round of the British 750 cc Championship which clinched the championship for him. He also finished 6th in that year's MCN Superbike Series. Potter was dominant at Lydden, winning both the Lord of Lydden in June and the Lord of the Flyers in July. As well as domestic competitions, Potter also raced in Europe at the Barcelona 24 hours, a round of the FIM Endurance Cup series, at Circuit Paul Ricard and at Rungis in the Grand Prix of Paris.

In 1973 Potter was in the British team for the Transatlantic Trophy, an annual match series between Britain and America held over the Easter weekend. Potter won the first race at Brands Hatch and finished 5th overall, the second highest finishing Briton. As well as domestic competitions, Potter also competed in Europe, in April at the Rouen Trophee 750 International and the Imola 200 both on the Kuhn Norton. Potter also competed in endurance racing on a BMW with co-rider Graham Sharp in the 24 hours of Barcelona and Bol d'Or.

Potter competed in the 24 hours of Barcelona again in 1974, this time on a Kuhn Norton with Gary Green as co-rider. Gus Kuhn entered Potter and Green on a Norton for the Thruxton 500 mile Endurance GP. At a late stage the pair changed to Green's Triumph Trident and they finished second. In domestic races Potter continued to race the Kuhn Norton including an impressive win in the wet in the production race at Brands Hatch's Hutchinson 100 meeting where he led from start to finish. Potter teamed up with Willie Ryan to develop and race the Crescent 500 cc bike. The machine was relatively unsuccessful but Potter did manage a production class win at Brands Brands Hatch. He also made his only appearance at the Isle of Man TT races in the Senior TT but failed to finish on the Crescent.

In 1975 Potter joined the BP sponsored team of Ted Broad. On the Broad Yamaha TZ750 Potter finished 5th in the MCN Superbike Championship. He also raced in two of the FIM Formula 750 Championship rounds, finishing 4th in the Imola 200 and second in the Mettet 1000 km. Potter was also chosen for the British team in the 1975 Transatlantic trophy.

Penthouse magazine, BMW and Gus Kuhn teamed up to provide BMW R90S machines for Potter and Green to compete in the 1975 Coupe d'Endurance series. The pair finished second at the 1000 km of Le Mans and fifth at the Barcelona 24 hours but failed to finish in the Bol d'Or.

With greater support from BP, the Broad team became more competitive in 1976. Potter finished 5th overall in the F750 Series, with podiums at Nivelles-Baulers and Silverstone. He also scored his first GP point for 10th place at the 500cc Dutch Grand Prix. On the domestic front, Potter was 4th in the MCN Superbike Championship and won the 'King of Brands' title.

Broad added a Suzuki RG 500 to the stable for 1977 (Yamaha had no racing 500 at that time) and Potter competed in the British ShellSport 500cc series on the RG. Competing on a Yamaha TZ750 in the MCN Superbike Championship he finished third.

At the 1978 Transatlantic Trophy, Potter was the top British individual scorer. In the MCN Superbike series, Potter won the rounds at Donington and Mallory and the series went down to the wire at the final round at Brands Hatch but Potter slid off and Barry Sheene won the championship. In the 500 cc ShellSport Championship Potter finished 5th.

Mitsui Yamaha, the UK importers, backed the Broad team in 1979. On works TZ750s Potter battled with Ron Haslam for the Superbike Championship. The series was again decided at the final round at Brands Hatch, this time Potter came out on top and won the championship. He also won Snetterton's 'Race of Aces'.

The long-awaited Yamaha 500-4 was available for 1980 and Potter returned to competing in the ShellSport 500cc Championship. With a win at Brands he finished 3rd in the series. He also competed at selected GP races on the 500. Retaining his Superbike championship was his main focus for the year, and he wrapped up the championship in the penultimate round at Mallory. Potter was awarded the 1980 ITV World of Sport Championship.

=== Death ===
Defending his Superbike championship at Oulton Park on Monday 31 August 1981, Potter won the first race. In the second heat he slid off at Cascades whilst in the lead and slip into an unprotected Armco barrier and suffered head injuries. He was taken to Chester Royal Infirmary and later transferred to Stoke Mandeville. Potter never regained consciousness and died on 18 September.

Potter was survived by his wife Sue and children Sara and Oliver.

== Career statistics ==
(key) (Races in bold indicate pole position; races in italics indicate fastest lap)

=== Motorcycle Grand Prix results ===
**Position**	1	2	3	4	5	6	7	8	9	10
**Points**	15	12	10	8	6	5	4	3	2	1

Year	Class	Bike	1	2	3	4	5	6	7	8	9	10	11	12	Points	Rank	Wins
1976	500cc	Yamaha	FRA -	AUT -	NAT -	IOM -	NED; 10	BEL -	SWE -	FIN -	CZE -	GER -			1	41st	0
1977	500cc	Suzuki	VEN -	AUT -	GER -	NAT -	FRA -	NED; DNF	BEL; 13	SWE -	FIN -	CZE -	GBR -		0	-	0
1978	500cc	Suzuki	VEN -	ESP -	AUT -	FRA -	NAT -	NED; DNS	BEL -	SWE -	FIN -	GBR; DNF	GER -		0	-	0
1979	500cc	Yamaha	VEN -	AUT -	GER -	NAT -	ESP -	YUG -	NED; DNQ	BEL -	SWE -	FIN -	GBR; DNF	FRA -	0	-	0
1980	500cc	Yamaha	NAT -	ESP -	FRA -	NED; 15	BEL; DNQ	FIN -	GBR; 10	GER -					1	18th	0
1981	500cc	Yamaha	AUT -	GER; DNF	NAT; DNF	FRA -	YUG -	NED; 6	BEL; 26	RSM -	GBR; NC	FIN -	SWE -		5	18th	0

=== Formula 750 Championship results ===
**Position**	1	2	3	4	5	6	7	8	9	10
**Points**	15	12	10	8	6	5	4	3	2	1

Year	Class	Bike	1	2	3	4	5	6	7	8	9	10	11	Pts	Pos
1975	750cc	Yamaha	USA -	ITA; 4	BEL; 2	FRA -	SWE -	FIN -	GBR -	NED -	GER -			20	13th
1976	750cc	Yamaha	USA; 22	ITA -	ESP -	BEL; 2	FRA -	GBR; 3	NED; 7	GER -				27	5th
1977	750cc	Yamaha	USA -	ITA -	ESP -	FRA -	GBR -	AUT; 12	BEL -	NED -	USA -	CAN -	GER -	0	-
1978	750cc	Yamaha	ITA -	FRA -	GBR; 10	AUS -	ESP -	GER -	BEL -	NED; 5	USA -	CAN -		7	20th
1979	750cc	Yamaha	ITA -	GBR; 6	FRA -	SWI -	AUS -	CAN -	USA -	NED -	GER -	YUG -		5	40th

=== FIM Endurance Cup ===
**Position**	1	2	3	4	5	6	7	8	9	10
**Points**	15	12	10	8	6	5	4	3	2	1

Year	Co-rider	Bike	1	2	3	4	5	Points	Rank
1972	Graham Sharp	Gus Kuhn Norton	BAR; 8	LIE -	BOL -	THR -		3	50th
1973	Graham Sharp	Gus Kuhn BMW	BAR; 7	LIE -	BOL; DNF	THR -		4	45th
1974	Graham Sharp	Gus Kuhn Norton; Triumph Trident	BAR; 7	LIE -	BOL -	THR; 2		16	9th
1975	Graham Sharp	Gus Kuhn BMW	BAR; 5	MUG -	LIE -	BOL; DNF	THR -	6	31st

=== TT Results ===
Year	Race	Bike	Results
1974	Senior TT	Ryan Crescent	DNF
