= 1981 Grand Prix motorcycle racing season =

Sports season

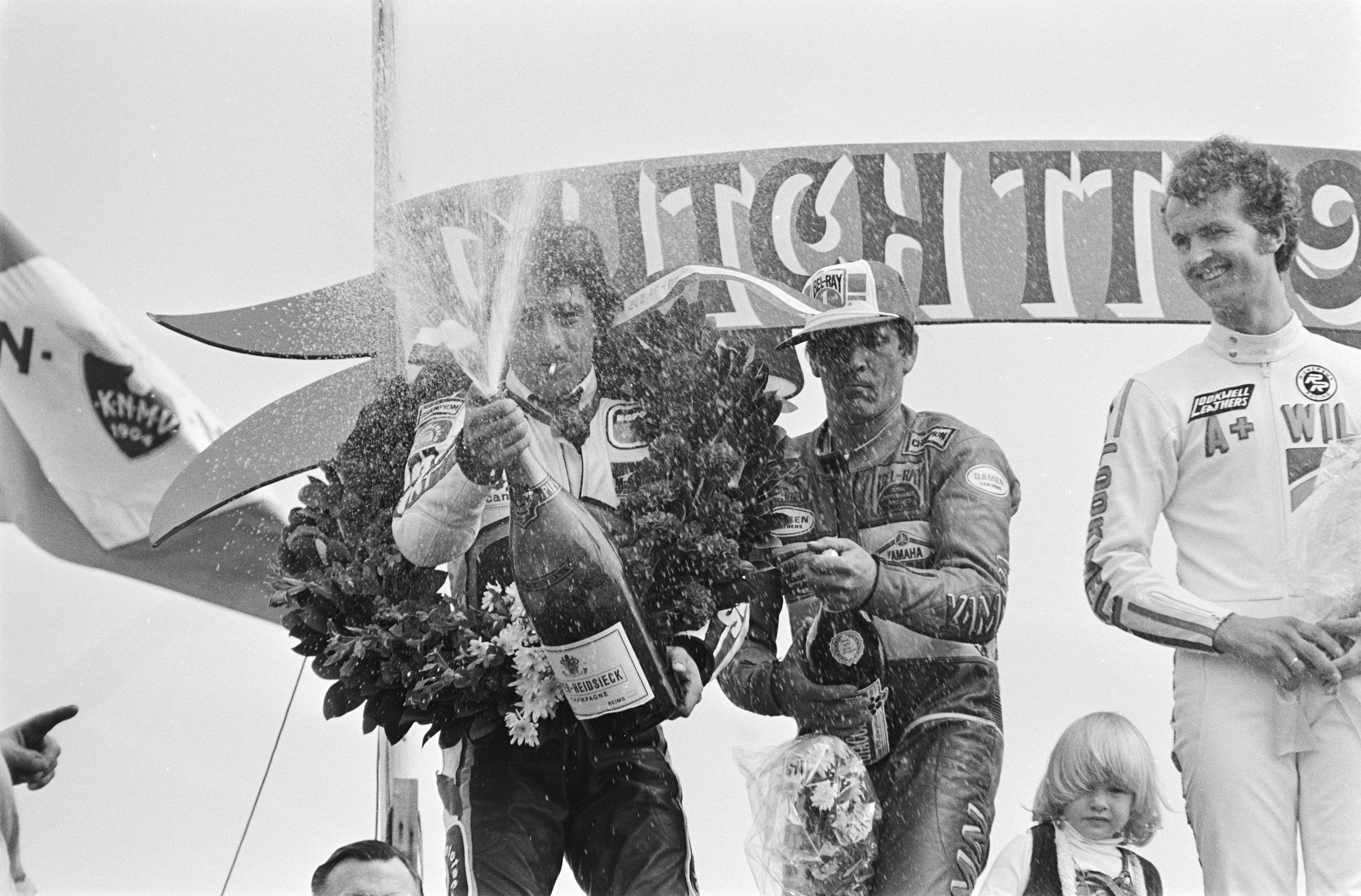
Marco Lucchinelli (pictured in Assen) became the 1981 500cc world champion

The 1981 Grand Prix motorcycle racing season was the 33rd F.I.M. Road Racing World Championship season.

== Season summary ==
In the 500cc world championship, two Suzuki teams fought for the title with Marco Lucchinelli riding for Roberto Gallina's Italian Suzuki team and, Randy Mamola riding for the Heron Suzuki team backed by the UK Suzuki importer. Mamola started the season strongly with two victories and two second-place finishes to take the lead in the championship but then, Lucchinelli took command with four victories in the next five races to claim the world championship. Mamola finished in second place for the second year in a row.

Barry Sheene would win the final race of his career with a win in Sweden while a young American named Freddie Spencer made his first foray into the world championships as a member of the Honda factory racing team, riding the four-stroke Honda NR500 up to fifth place at the British Grand Prix before it suffered a mechanical failure.

Germany's Anton Mang scored double world championship victories, defeating defending champion Jon Ekerold for the 350cc title and, winning ten of twelve 250 events to take that title. Frenchman Michel Rougerie, who finished second in 1975 250 championship, was killed when he was hit by another rider after crashing in the 350 race in Yugoslavia. Angel Nieto won his tenth championship by winning eight of twelve rounds on his Minarelli while Ricardo Tormo won the 50cc crown for Bultaco.

Beginning in 1981, motorcycle frame technology evolved quickly as motorcycle manufacturers moved from the steel, featherbed frame chassis first developed in the 1950s, to aluminium frames featuring large, twin beams as first pioneered by Spanish constructor, Antonio Cobas.

== 1981 Grand Prix season calendar ==
The following Grands Prix were scheduled to take place in 1981:

Round	Date	Grand Prix	Circuit
1	22 March	(Argentina) Argentine Grand Prix	Autódromo Municipal de la Ciudad de Buenos Aires
2	26 April	(Austria) Großer Preis von Österreich	Salzburgring
3	3 May	(Germany) Großer Preis von Deutschland	Hockenheimring
4	10 May	(Italy) Gran Premio delle Nazioni	Autodromo Nazionale Monza
5	17 May	Grand Prix de France Moto	Circuit Paul Ricard
6	24 May	(Spain) Gran Premio de España	Circuito Permanente Del Jarama
7	31 May	(Socialist Federal Republic of Yugoslavia) Yu Grand Prix	Automotodrom Rijeka
8	27 June	(Netherlands) Dutch TT Assen	TT Circuit Assen
9	5 July	(Belgium) Grand Prix Moto	Circuit de Spa-Francorchamps
10	12 July	Gran Premio di San Marino	Autodromo Dino Ferrari
11	2 August	(United Kingdom) Marlboro British Grand Prix	Silverstone Circuit
12	9 August	(Finland) Finnish GP	Imatra Circuit
13	16 August	(Sweden) Swedish TT	Scandinavian Raceway
14	30 August	(Czechoslovakia) Grand Prix ČSSR	Brno Circuit

=== Calendar changes ===
- The Argentine Grand Prix was added to the calendar.
- The Austrian Grand Prix returned on the calendar after a one-year absence. Last year's scheduled running of the event was cancelled due to snowy weather conditions on race week.
- The German Grand Prix was moved forward, from 24 August to 3 May.
- The German Grand Prix moved from the Nürburgring-Nordschleife to the Hockenheimring for the next three years due to ongoing construction to replace it with a new venue.
- The Nations Grand Prix moved from the Circuito Internazionale Santa Monica to the Autodromo Nazionale Monza.
- The Yugoslavian Grand Prix was moved forward, from 15 June to 31 May.
- The Belgian Grand Prix moved from Circuit Zolder to Circuit de Spa-Francorchamps after the track problems at Spa-Francorchamps were resolved.
- The San Marino Grand Prix was added to the calendar.
- The Finnish Grand Prix was moved back, from 27 July to 9 August.
- The Swedish Grand Prix was added to the calendar after a one-year absence.

== Results and standings ==
=== 1981 Grand Prix season results ===
Round	Date:	Race	Location	50cc winner	125cc winner	250cc winner	350cc winner	500cc winner	Report
1	22 March	(Argentina) Argentine Grand Prix	Buenos Aires		(Spain) Angel Nieto	(France) Jean-François Baldé	(South Africa) Jon Ekerold		Report
2	26 April	(Austria) Austrian Grand Prix	Salzburgring		(Spain) Angel Nieto		(France) Patrick Fernandez	(United States) Randy Mamola	Report
3	3 May	(Germany) German Grand Prix	Hockenheim	(Switzerland) Stefan Dörflinger	(Spain) Angel Nieto	(Germany) Anton Mang	(Germany) Anton Mang	(United States) Kenny Roberts	Report
4	10 May	(Italy) Nations Grand Prix	Monza	(Spain) Ricardo Tormo	(France) Guy Bertin	(France) Eric Saul	(South Africa) Jon Ekerold	(United States) Kenny Roberts	Report
5	17 May	(France) French Grand Prix	Paul Ricard		(Spain) Angel Nieto	(Germany) Anton Mang		(Italy) Marco Lucchinelli	Report
6	24 May	(Spain) Spanish Grand Prix	Jarama	(Spain) Ricardo Tormo	(Spain) Angel Nieto	(Germany) Anton Mang			Report
7	31 May	(Socialist Federal Republic of Yugoslavia) Yugoslavian Grand Prix	Rijeka	(Spain) Ricardo Tormo	(Italy) Loris Reggiani		(Germany) Anton Mang	(United States) Randy Mamola	Report
8	27 June	(Netherlands) Dutch TT	Assen	(Spain) Ricardo Tormo	(Spain) Angel Nieto	(Germany) Anton Mang	(Germany) Anton Mang	(Italy) Marco Lucchinelli	Report
9	5 July	(Belgium) Belgian Grand Prix	Spa-Francorchamps	(Spain) Ricardo Tormo		(Germany) Anton Mang		(Italy) Marco Lucchinelli	Report
10	12 July	San Marino Grand Prix	Imola	(Spain) Ricardo Tormo	(Italy) Loris Reggiani	(Germany) Anton Mang		(Italy) Marco Lucchinelli	Report
11	2 August	(United Kingdom) British Grand Prix	Silverstone		(Spain) Angel Nieto	(Germany) Anton Mang	(Germany) Anton Mang	(Netherlands) Jack Middelburg	Report
12	9 August	(Finland) Finnish Grand Prix	Imatra		(Spain) Angel Nieto	(Germany) Anton Mang		(Italy) Marco Lucchinelli	Report
13	16 August	(Sweden) Swedish Grand Prix	Anderstorp		(Spain) Ricardo Tormo	(Germany) Anton Mang		(United Kingdom) Barry Sheene	Report
14	30 August	(Czechoslovakia) Czechoslovak Grand Prix	Brno Circuit	(Netherlands) Theo Timmer		(Germany) Anton Mang	(Germany) Anton Mang		Report

=== 500cc riders' standings ===
Scoring system

Points were awarded to the top ten finishers in each race. A rider has to finish the race to earn points. All races counted towards the final standings.

Position	1st	2nd	3rd	4th	5th	6th	7th	8th	9th	10th
Points	15	12	10	8	6	5	4	3	2	1

Place	Rider	Team	Machine	AUT (Austria)	GER (Germany)	NAT (Italy)	FRA (France)	YUG (Socialist Federal Republic of Yugoslavia)	NED (Netherlands)	BEL (Belgium)	SMR (San Marino)	GBR (United Kingdom)	FIN (Finland)	SWE (Sweden)	Points
1	(Italy) Marco Lucchinelli	Nava Gallina-Suzuki	RG500	Ret	3	5	1	2	1	1	1	19	1	9	105
2	(United States) Randy Mamola	Heron-Suzuki	RG500	1	2	Ret	2	1	Ret	3	4	3	2	13	94
3	(United States) Kenny Roberts	Yamaha International	YZR500	Ret	1	1	5	3	Ret	2	DNS	2	7	Ret	74
4	(United Kingdom) Barry Sheene	Akai-Yamaha	YZR500	4	6	3	4	5	Ret	4	2	Ret	Ret	1	72
5	(New Zealand) Graeme Crosby	Heron-Suzuki	RG500	2	13	2	3	4	Ret	7	3	Ret	5	5	68
6	(Netherlands) Boet van Dulmen	IMN Yamaha	YZR500	5	4	4	8	7	2	5	Ret	6	Ret	2	64
7	(Netherlands) Jack Middelburg	Racing Westland Suzuki	RG500	8	8	7	9	DNS	5	6	7	1	4	3	60
8	(South Africa) Kork Ballington	Team Kawasaki	KR500	6	Ret	Ret	7	DNS	3	19	5	Ret	3	4	43
9	(France) Marc Fontan	Sonauto Gauloises-Yamaha	YZR500	12	9	Ret	10	Ret	13	8	8	5	6	6	25
10	(Japan) Hiroyuki Kawasaki	Heron-Suzuki	RG500	3	7	Ret	6								19
11	(France) Bernard Fau	GPA Total	RG500	Ret	25		12	12	7	10	Ret	4	Ret	10	14
12	(Italy) Guido Paci	Belgarda Yamaha	YZR500			6		9	9	12	6	13	Ret	Ret	14
13	(Italy) Franco Uncini	Uncini-Suzuki	RG500	7	10	8	Ret	Ret	Ret	Ret	Ret	16	Ret	7	12
14	(Netherlands) Willem Zoet	Stimorol Racing	RG500					14	4	9	Ret				10
15	(Finland) Seppo Rossi		RG500	15	Ret	16	11	8	11	17	14		8	8	9
16	(Italy) Gianni Pelletier		RG500	10	Ret	Ret		6	Ret	16	9		Ret	Ret	8
17	(Switzerland) Michel Frutschi	Hostettler Yamaha	YZR500	Ret	5				16	23	16	Ret	11	Ret	6
18	(United Kingdom) Dave Potter	Team BP-Yamaha	YZR500		Ret	Ret			6	26		NC			5
19	(New Zealand) Stuart Avant	Ellis Racing	RG500	Ret	Ret	19	16		19	22		7			4
20	(Switzerland) Sergio Pellandini		RG500	17	21	10	13	Ret	8	15	11	Ret	Ret	16	4
21	(Japan) Ikujiro Takai	Yamaha International	YZR500									8	Ret		3
22	(United Kingdom) Steve Parrish	Mitsui Yamaha	YZR500			DNQ			18	20	Ret	9	10	15	3
23	(France) Frank Gross		RG500			DNQ	DNQ	15	DNQ	Ret			9		2
24	(Netherlands) Wil Hartog	Riemersma Racing	RG500	9	14										2
25	(France) Christian Sarron	Sonauto Gauloises-Yamaha	YZR500		Ret	9	Ret		17	Ret	12	18	Ret	Ret	2
26	(Japan) Sadao Asami	Yamaha International	YZR500	23	11	14	Ret	Ret	10	11	Ret	NC	Ret	Ret	1
27	(United Kingdom) Chris Guy		RG500									10			1
28	(United Kingdom) Keith Huewen	Heron-Suzuki	RG500		Ret	17	Ret		DNQ	13	10	Ret			1
29	(Finland) Kimmo Kopra		RG500		16		14	10	20	Ret	15		Ret	18	1
	(Italy) Graziano Rossi	Morbidelli	Morbidelli 500-4	Ret	Ret	Ret		Ret	Ret	Ret		11	Ret	11	0
	(Switzerland) Philippe Coulon	Frankonia-Suzuki	RG500	11	12	Ret	Ret	Ret	15	27	Ret	Ret	15	17	0
	(France) Dominique Pernet		YZR500		26		19	11		18					0
	(Italy) Leandro Beccheroni		RG500			11									0
	(Italy) Gianni Rolando		RG500			12	Ret	Ret			Ret		12	Ret	0
	(Sweden) Peter Sjöström		RG500		17	21	Ret			Ret		12	Ret	22	0
	(Netherlands) Dick Alblas	Hollande Isolatie	RG500						12						0
	(Sweden) Lars Johansson		RG500											12	0
	(Italy) Walter Migliorati		RG500	14	18	13	15	Ret			13				0
	(Switzerland) Alain Roethlisberger		RG500	22	22	18	22	13						20	0
	(Japan) Takazumi Katayama	HRC-Honda	NR500	13	Ret	Ret	Ret		Ret						0
	(Finland) Timo Pohjola		RG500										13		0
	(Denmark) Børge Nielsen		RG500					16		21	Ret		14	14	0
	(Venezuela) Roberto Pietri		RG500			DNQ	21					14			0
	(United States) Dale Singleton	Beaulieu Yamaha	YZR500		Ret				Ret	14		Ret			0
	(Australia) Gregg Hansford	Team Kawasaki	KR500						14	Ret					0
	(France) Raymond Roche		RG500	Ret	15	15	Ret								0
	(Germany) Andreas Hofmann		RG500		Ret		20					15			0
	(France) Christian Estrosi		YZR500	16	19	Ret	Ret	Ret	Ret	29	Ret	Ret			0
	(Germany) Josef Hage	Dieter Braun Team	YZR500	19	23	DNQ	23	17	DNQ			20			0
	(France) Jean Lafond		RG500		Ret		17								0
	(Italy) Fabio Biliotti		RG500			Ret					17				0
	(United Kingdom) Graham Wood		YZR500									17			0
	(Netherlands) Henk de Vries	Henk de Vries Motoren	YZR500	18	20										0
	(Brazil) Marco Greco		RG500		29	DNQ	24	18							0
	(Italy) Rafaelle Pasqual		YZR500	Ret			DNQ				18				0
	(France) Jacques Agopian		RG500				18								0
	(Italy) Carlo Perugini	Sanvenero	Sanvenero 500			DNQ	DNQ	19	DNQ		Ret	23	Ret		0
	(Italy) Virginio Ferrari	Cagiva	GP500		30	Ret	DNQ	Ret	DNQ		19				0
	(Sweden) Åke Grahn		YZR500											19	0
	(Austria) Michael Schmid		RG500	20	24	DNQ									0
	(Italy) Marco Papa		RG500			20									0
	(Germany) Jochen Schmid		RG500					20							0
	(Sweden) Lennart Bäckström		RG500	21			DNQ								0
	(United Kingdom) Alex George		YZR500									21			0
	(Sweden) Peter Sköld		RG500											21	0
	(United Kingdom) Barry Woodland		RG500									22			0
	(Belgium) Philippe Chaltin		RG500							24					0
	(New Zealand) Dennis Ireland		RG500							25		Ret			0
	(Germany) Gerhard Vogt		RG500		27										0
	(Germany) Günter Dreier		RG500		28										0
	(United Kingdom) Gary Lingham		RG500							28		Ret			0
	(Germany) Gustav Reiner	Team Solitude Deutschland	Solo	Ret		Ret	Ret								0
	(South Africa) Jon Ekerold	Team Solitude Deutschland	Solo	Ret	Ret	DNQ		Ret							0
	(United States) Mike Baldwin		RG500		Ret		Ret	Ret							0
	(Austria) Stefan Klabacher	Saga Racing	YZR500	Ret	Ret										0
	(Italy) Adelio Faccioli		RG500		Ret	Ret									0
	(France) Patrick Fernandez		YZR500	Ret											0
	(Australia) Graeme Geddes		YZR500	Ret											0
	(Austria) Fritz Kerschbaumer	Triumph Club Wien	YZR500	Ret											0
	(Switzerland) Wolfgang von Muralt		YZR500		Ret										0
	(Germany) Klaus Klein	FKN			Ret										0
	(Germany) Peter Ammann		RG500		Ret										0
	(France) Herve Guilleux		YZR500				Ret								0
	(France) Hubert Rigal		YZR500				Ret								0
	(Italy) Sergio Bertocchi		RG500					Ret							0
	(United States) Freddie Spencer	HRC-Honda	NR500									Ret			0
	(United Kingdom) Steve Henshaw		RG500									Ret			0
	(United Kingdom) John Newbold		RG500									Ret			0
	(Italy) Corrado Tuzii		RG500									Ret			0
	(Finland) Seppo Korhonen		RG500										Ret		0
	(Sweden) Bengt Slydal		RG500											Ret	0
	(United States) Gina Bovaird		YZR500				DNQ								0
	(Netherlands) Rob Punt		RG500						DNQ						0

=== 350cc standings ===
Place	Rider	Machine	ARG (Argentina)	AUT (Austria)	GER (Germany)	NAT (Italy)	YUG (Socialist Federal Republic of Yugoslavia)	NED (Netherlands)	Points
1	(West Germany) Anton Mang	Kawasaki KR350	7	2	1	2	1	1	103
2	(South Africa) Jon Ekerold	Yamaha TZ 350	1	3	Ret	1	2		52
3	(France) Jean-François Baldé	Kawasaki KR350	2	Ret	Ret	Ret	6	3	49
4	(France) Patrick Fernandez	Yamaha TZ 350	4	1	Ret	4	7	4	46
5	(Venezuela) Carlos Lavado	Yamaha TZ 350	3	5	Ret	8	3	2	41
6	(United Kingdom) Keith Huewen	Yamaha TZ 350		6	4	Ret	Ret	7	29
7	(France) Thierry Espié	Yamaha TZ 350	6	8	3	Ret	5	Ret	24
8	(Switzerland) Jacques Cornu	Yamaha TZ 350	9	7	25	20	4		20
9	(France) Eric Saul	Chevallier-Yamaha	Ret	Ret	2	5	Ret		18
10	(Australia) Graeme McGregor	Yamaha TZ 350			7	7		5	14
11	(Australia) Graeme Geddes	Yamaha TZ 350	8	4	Ret	Ret	Ret		11
12	(Germany) Martin Wimmer	Yamaha TZ 350	Ret		19	11	10	9	11
13	(Germany) Gustav Reiner	Yamaha TZ 350	Ret		12	Ret			10
14	(Italy) Massimo Matteoni	Yamaha TZ 350				3	Ret	Ret	10
15	(Australia) Jeffrey Sayle	Yamaha TZ 350	5		Ret	Ret		Ret	10
16	(Netherlands) Mar Schouten	Yamaha TZ 350						6	10
17	(Switzerland) Wolfgang Von Muralt	Yamaha TZ 350				Ret	13		8
18	(Belgium) Didier de Radiguès	Yamaha TZ 350	Ret			Ret	Ret		8
19	(Netherlands) Peter Looijensteijn	Yamaha TZ 350	12	Ret	8	9		8	8
20	(United Kingdom) Charlie Williams	Yamaha TZ 350							6
21	(Finland) Pekka Nurmi	Yamaha TZ 350			5		Ret		6
22	(Italy) Sauro Pazzaglia	Yamaha TZ 350			Ret	Ret	9	Ret	6
23	(France) Roger Sibille	Yamaha TZ 350	Ret		6	Ret	Ret	16	5
24	(South Africa) Alan North	Yamaha TZ 350		Ret	13	6		Ret	5
25	(Finland) Reino Eskelinen	Yamaha TZ 350			26	16	12	Ret	4
26	(United Kingdom) Tony Rogers	Yamaha TZ 350			11	Ret	8		3
27	(Belgium) Rene Delaby	Yamaha TZ 350			17	14	Ret	14	3
28	(Austria) Edi Stoellinger	Kawasaki KR350		10	9	12	Ret		3
29	(United Kingdom) Donnie Robinson	Yamaha TZ 350							2
30	(United Kingdom) Tony Head	Yamaha TZ 350		9	Ret	13	11	11	2
31	(Italy) Paolo Ferretti	Yamaha TZ 350	11	12	10	Ret	14		2
32	(France) Michel Rougerie	Yamaha TZ 350	Ret	Ret		10	Ret		1
33	(Sweden) Bengt Elgh	Yamaha TZ 350			21	15		10	1
34	(Chile) Vincenzo Cascino	Yamaha TZ 350	10		Ret				1
	(Switzerland) Bruno Kneubuhler	Yamaha TZ 350		11	18	Ret		Ret	0
	(Germany) Walter Hoffmann	Yamaha TZ 350						12	0
	(United Kingdom) Clive Horton	Yamaha TZ 350			16			13	0
	(Argentina) Yervant Samirdjian	Yamaha TZ 350	13						0
	(Brazil) Lucilo Baumer	Yamaha TZ 350	14						0
	(France) Jean-Louis Albera	Yamaha TZ 350			14				0
	(Netherlands) Klaas Hernamdt	Yamaha TZ 350	Ret			18	15		0
	(Argentina) Limberg Moreira	Yamaha TZ 350	15						0
	(Germany) Werner Hilbk	Yamaha TZ 350			15				0
	(Finland) Eero Hyvarinen	Yamaha TZ 350						15	0
	(Argentina) Dimas Anggara	Yamaha TZ 350	16						0
	(Austria) Werner Schmied	Yamaha TZ 350					16		0
	(Netherlands) Rinus van Kasteren	Yamaha TZ 350			Ret	17	Ret	17	0
	(Austria) Manfred Obinger	Yamaha TZ 350					17		0
	(Socialist Federal Republic of Yugoslavia) Mitja Erjavec	Yamaha TZ 350					18		0
	(Socialist Federal Republic of Yugoslavia) Mladen Tomic	Yamaha TZ 350						18	0
	(Venezuela) Eduardo Aleman	Yamaha TZ 350	Ret			19	Ret		0
	(Switzerland) Edwin Weibel	Yamaha TZ 350						19	0
	(Germany) Manfred Herweh	Yamaha TZ 350			20				0
	(Germany) Alois Tost	Yamaha TZ 350			22				0
	(Germany) Heinz Chittka	Yamaha TZ 350			23				0
	(Germany) Bodo Schmidt	Yamaha TZ 350			24				0
	(Austria) Siegfried Minich	Yamaha TZ 350		Ret		Ret	Ret	Ret	0
	(Argentina) Marcelo Diez	Yamaha TZ 350	Ret						0
	(Brazil) Claudio Girotto	Yamaha TZ 350	Ret						0
	(Argentina) Fernando Cerdera	Kawasaki KR350	Ret						0
	(Venezuela) Rafael Olavarria	Yamaha TZ 350	Ret						0
	(France) Pierre Bolle	Yamaha TZ 350	Ret						0
	(Argentina) Alfredo Rios	Yamaha TZ 350	Ret						0
	(Argentina) Pancracio Catania	Yamaha TZ 350	Ret						0
	(Venezuela) Alejandro Aleman	Yamaha TZ 350	Ret						0
	(Italy) Walter Villa	Yamaha TZ 350		Ret					0
	(Italy) Arturo Venanzi	Yamaha TZ 350				Ret			0
	(Socialist Federal Republic of Yugoslavia) Vojko Princic	Yamaha TZ 350					Ret		0
	(Socialist Federal Republic of Yugoslavia) Bozo Janesic	Yamaha TZ 350					Ret		0
	(Japan) Yoshimasa Matsumoto	Yamaha TZ 350					Ret		0
	(Socialist Federal Republic of Yugoslavia) Marijan Kosic	Yamaha TZ 350					Ret		0
	(Czechoslovakia) Marian Srna	Yamaha TZ 350					Ret		0
	(France) Jacques Bolle	Yamaha TZ 350						Ret	0
	(United States) Richard Schlachter	Yamaha TZ 350						Ret	0
	(United Kingdom) Mick Grant	Yamaha TZ 350						Ret	0

=== 250cc standings ===
Place	Rider	Machine	ARG (Argentina)	GER (Germany)	NAT (Italy)	FRA (France)	ESP (Spain)	NED (Netherlands)	BEL (Belgium)	Points
1	(West Germany) Anton Mang	Kawasaki	14	1	3	1	1	1	1	160
2	(France) Jean-François Baldé	Kawasaki	1	9	6	4	2	6	3	95
3	(Switzerland) Roland Freymond	Ad Majora	5	3	Ret	Ret	13	4	11	72
4	(Venezuela) Carlos Lavado	Yamaha	Ret	2	Ret	3	3	2	2	56
5	(France) Patrick Fernandez	Yamaha	3	Ret	5	7	6	3	12	43
6	(France) Jean-Louis Guignabodet	Kawasaki	12	13	10	14	5	7	14	36
7	(France) Jean-Louis Tournadre	Yamaha		Ret		Ret	16		6	34
8	(West Germany) Martin Wimmer	Yamaha	6	17	4	16	8	8	Ret	33
9	(Belgium) Didier de Radiguès	Yamaha	9	23	13	Ret	Ret	10	5	26
10	(United States) Richard Schlachter	Yamaha		6	Ret	Ret	4	9	DNQ	25
11	(France) Thierry Espie	Chevallier-Yamaha	10	Ret	7	2	10	Ret	Ret	24
12	(Italy) Maurizio Massimiani	Ad Majora	13	14	2	8	7	13	8	22
13	(France) Eric Saul	Chevallier-Yamaha	7		1	Ret	20			19
14	(Italy) Paolo Ferretti	Yamaha	Ret	4	Ret	Ret	19	19	18	16
15	(Australia) Graeme Geddes	Yamaha	2	11	Ret	22	9		13	14
16	(Belgium) Jean Marc Toffolo	Armstrong	16		Ret	18	15	Ret	4	12
17	(France) Christian Estrosi	Yamaha	Ret	12	9	10		18	Ret	12
18	(Australia) Graeme McGregor	Yamaha		10	Ret	DNQ		11	Ret	11
19	(France) Roger Sibille	Yamaha	11	18		6	Ret		16	11
20	(France) Herve Guilleux	Siroko-Rotax	4		Ret	9	Ret	Ret	Ret	10
21	(Italy) Pier Luigi Conforti	Kawasaki			Ret					8
22	(Austria) Edi Stoellinger	Kawasaki		7	8					7
23	(Finland) Eero Hyvärinen	Yamaha							17	6
24	(Australia) Jeffrey Sayle	Armstrong	Ret		14	DNQ		5	Ret	6
25	(Spain) Angel Nieto	Siroko-Rotax	Ret	5	Ret	DNQ	Ret	12		6
26	(France) Pierre Bolle	Yamaha				5			Ret	6
27	(Switzerland) Bruno Kneubühler	Rotax		8	17	15	Ret	14	DNQ	5
28	(Spain) Sito Pons	Siroko-Rotax				Ret	Ret		7	4
29	(France) Jacques Bolle	Yamaha							9	4
30	(Italy) Loris Reggiani	Yamaha	8	Ret	Ret	21	14			3
31	(France) Andre Gouin	Yamaha		15		13			10	3
32	(United Kingdom) Steve Tonkin	Armstrong							DNQ	1
33	(Sweden) Bengt Elgh	Yamaha								1
34	(Austria) Siegfried Minich	Bartol-Yamaha						Ret	DNQ	1
	(South Africa) Alan North	Yamaha			16	17	11		Ret	0
	(Italy) Franco Marchegiani	Yamaha		20	11		18	16	Ret	0
	(France) Alain Beraud	Yamaha				11			Ret	0
	(Italy) Sauro Pazzaglia	MBA			Ret	DNQ	12	Ret		0
	(United Kingdom) Tony Rogers	Yamaha				12			Ret	0
	(Italy) Germano Conti	MBA			12					0
	(Germany) Karl-Thomas Grassel	Yamaha	Ret	16	15	23	17			0
	(France) Pierre Tocco	Yamaha		Ret		20			15	0
	(Netherlands) Mar Schouten	MBA						15	Ret	0
	(Venezuela) Eduardo Aleman	Yamaha	15							0
	(Austria) August Auinger	Rotax						17	Ret	0
	(Switzerland) Jacques Cornu	Egli	17			DNQ				0
	(Brazil) Lauro Assakawa	Yamaha	18							0
	(Italy) Gianpaolo Marchetti	MBA	Ret	19	Ret					0
	(France) Antoine Longo	Yamaha				19				0
	(Germany) Gerhard Waibel	Yamaha							19	0
	(Netherlands) Rinus van Kasteren	Yamaha						20		0
	(Belgium) Olivier Liegeois	Yamaha							20	0
	(United Kingdom) Clive Horton	Armstrong		25	Ret		Ret	21	DNQ	0
	(Italy) Massimo Matteoni	Tre Stelle		21	Ret					0
	(United Kingdom) Tony Head	Yamaha		Ret			21		DNQ	0
	(Germany) Walter Hoffmann	Yamaha		22						0
	(Spain) Carlos Morante	Yamaha					22			0
	(Germany) Jurgen Schmit	Yamaha		24						0
	(France) Jean-Louis Albera	Kawasaki				24				0
	(Belgium) Etienne Geeraerd	Yamaha		26					DNQ	0
	(Germany) Bernd Schappacher	Rotax		27						0
	(United Kingdom) Johnny Scott	Yamaha		28						0
	(Germany) Franz Schwarz	Yamaha		29						0
	(Germany) Gerhard Vogt	Rotax		30						0
	(Netherlands) Peter Looijestein	Yamaha	Ret	Ret	Ret			Ret	DNQ	0
	(United States) Eddie Lawson	Kawasaki		Ret	Ret	Ret				0
	(France) Michel Rougerie	Yamaha	Ret			Ret	Ret			0
	(Netherlands) Klaas Hernamdt	Yamaha	Ret	Ret				Ret		0
	(Switzerland) Hans Müller	MBA			Ret	Ret		Ret		0
	(Finland) Pekka Nurmi	Yamaha		Ret		Ret				0
	(Germany) Herbert Hauf	FKN		Ret				Ret		0
	(France) Jean-Jacques Peyre	Yamaha				Ret			Ret	0
	(Venezuela) Ivan Palazzese	Yamaha	Ret							0
	(Germany) Michael Lederer	Yamaha		Ret						0
	(Japan) Sadao Asami	Yamaha		Ret						0
	(Germany) Stefan Jannsen	Yamaha		Ret						0
	(United Kingdom) Mick Grant	Armstrong							Ret	0
	(Belgium) Michel Simeon	Yamaha							DNS	0

=== 125cc standings ===
Place	Rider	Machine	ARG (Argentina)	AUT (Austria)	GER (Germany)	NAT (Italy)	FRA (France)	ESP (Spain)	YUG (Socialist Federal Republic of Yugoslavia)	NED (Netherlands)	SMR (San Marino)	Points
1	(Spain) Angel Nieto	Minarelli	1	1	1	4	1	1	Ret	1	2	140
2	(Italy) Loris Reggiani	Minarelli	2	2	Ret	2	6	5	1	2	1	95
3	(Italy) Pier Paolo Bianchi	MBA	5	3	Ret	Ret	3	3	2	3	3	84
4	(Switzerland) Hans Müller	MBA		6	3	5	4	4	3	4	17	58
5	(France) Jacques Bolle	Motobécane	3	Ret	Ret	3	26	6	11	Ret	5	55
6	(France) Guy Bertin	Sanvenero	Ret	Ret	Ret	1	2	Ret	Ret	10	Ret	40
7	(Venezuela) Iván Palazzese	MBA	Ret				7	2	6	5	Ret	37
8	(Spain) Ricardo Tormo	Sanvenero	12		Ret					8	4	36
9	(Italy) Maurizio Vitali	MBA		8	14	7	5	Ret	4	6	Ret	36
10	(Argentina) Hugo Vignetti	MBA	Ret	Ret			Ret	8	7		6	30
11	(Switzerland) Stefan Dörflinger	MBA			2	6	11	7	5			27
12	(France) Jean Claude Selini	MBA			Ret	16	9		9	9		18
13	(Argentina) Willy Perez	MBA	4	11	17	8	15	11	Ret	15	10	15
14	(Austria) August Auinger	Bartol		Ret	Ret	Ret	8		10	7	9	14
15	(Germany) Gerhard Waibel	MBA		5			12		8	Ret	8	12
16	(Finland) Johnny Wickstroem	MBA		15	8		16	Ret		13	13	10
17	(Sweden) Per Edward Carlsson	MBA	7	7	Ret	18	10			11	16	9
18	(Italy) Eugenio Lazzarini	Iprem		4	Ret	Ret	Ret	12	Ret		Ret	8
19	(Germany) Gert Bender	Bender			4							8
20	(Netherlands) Anton Straver	MBA		13	16	Ret	Ret			16	12	8
21	(France) Thierry Noblesse	MBA		14	5	Ret	Ret				11	7
22	(Netherlands) Henk Van Kessel	EGA		10	6			10	Ret	14		7
23	(Venezuela) Ivan Troisi	MBA	6									5
24	(France) Michel Galbit	MBA			15	13	14		12			5
25	(Italy) Roberto Ruosi	MBA				Ret					7	4
26	(Hungary) Janos Drapal	MBA			7	Ret				Ret		4
27	(Spain) Fernando González de Nicolas	MBA	8									3
28	(Austria) Hans Hummel	MBA		9	Ret							2
29	(Switzerland) Joe Genoud	MBA			9	Ret	20	13	13	20	15	2
30	(Italy) Maurizio Musco	MBA				9						2
31	(France) Yves Dupont	MBA		12		Ret	13	9	Ret	Ret		2
32	(Sweden) Jan Bäckström	MBA									DNQ	2
33	(Australia) Barry Smith	MBA	9									2
34	(Belgium) Olivier Liegeois	MBA									14	1
35	(Germany) Alfred Waibel	MBA			10	Ret		Ret				1
36	(Italy) Michele Ettore	MBA				10						1
37	(Austria) Erich Klein	MBA		Ret	12		22		15	12	Ret	1
38	(Argentina) Norberto Gatti	Minarelli	10									1
	(Germany) Stefan Jannsen	MBA			11	14						0
	(Argentina) Fabian Gonzales	MBA	11									0
	(United Kingdom) Peter Hubbard	MBA				11						0
	(Netherlands) Ton Spek	MBA		17		12	Ret					0
	(France) Jacky Hutteau	Afam			13		18	Ret	Ret		18	0
	(Netherlands) Theo Timmer	MBA		16	22	Ret		14	14		Ret	0
	(France) Bernard Gatti	MBA						15	18			0
	(Italy) Libero Piccirillo	MBA				15						0
	(Czechoslovakia) Peter Balaz	MBA					24		16	22	19	0
	(Belgium) Chris Baert	MBA			24			16	20			0
	(France) Joel Benniza	MBA				17	Ret					0
	(France) Paul Bordes	MBA					17					0
	(Socialist Federal Republic of Yugoslavia) Janez Pintar	Hess							17			0
	(Netherlands) Jan Eggens	EGA								17		0
	(Netherlands) Jan Huberts	Sanvenero			18					18		0
	(France) Frédéric Michel	MBA			26		19					0
	(Germany) Norbert Peschke	MBA			19							0
	(Socialist Federal Republic of Yugoslavia) Marijan Kosic	MBA							19			0
	(Netherlands) Boy van Erp	MBA								19		0
	(Czechoslovakia) Zbynek Havrda	MBA			20							0
	(Belgium) Lucio Pietroniro	MBA					21			23	Ret	0
	(Germany) Robert Bauer	MBA			21							0
	(Austria) Werner Schmied	MBA							21			0
	(Netherlands) Peter van Niel	MBA								21		0
	(Germany) Walter Kaletsch	MBA			23							0
	(Algeria) Bady Hassaine	MBA					23					0
	(Monaco) Joël Malatino	MBA					25				Ret	0
	(France) François Wirtz	MBA			25							0
	(United Kingdom) Spencer Crabbe	MBA					27					0
	(Switzerland) Reiner Koster	MBA					Ret		Ret		DNQ	0
	(Italy) Nardone	MBA				Ret					Ret	0
	(Italy) Italo Zerbini	MBA							Ret		Ret	0
	(Argentina) Francisco Incorvaia	MBA	Ret									0
	(Italy) Pierluigi Aldrovandi	MBA				Ret						0
	(Italy) Ivan Villini	MBA				Ret						0
	(United Kingdom) John Kernan	MBA				Ret						0
	(Italy) Rino Zuliani	MBA				Ret						0
	(France) Patrick Herouard	Sanvenero					Ret					0
	(Switzerland) Jean-Michel Perret	MBA					Ret					0
	(Spain) Antonio Garcia	MBA						Ret				0
	(Spain) Juan Carlos Gonzales	MBA						Ret				0
	(Spain) Pablo Cegarra	MBA						Ret				0
	(Socialist Federal Republic of Yugoslavia) Zdravko Ljeljak	MBA							Ret			0
	(Socialist Federal Republic of Yugoslavia) Vladimir Hegel	MBA							Ret			0
	(Socialist Federal Republic of Yugoslavia) Alojz Pavlic	MBA							Ret			0
	(Italy) Maurizio Goretti	MBA									Ret	0
Place	Rider	Machine	ARG (Argentina)	AUT (Austria)	GER (Germany)	NAT (Italy)	FRA (France)	ESP (Spain)	YUG (Socialist Federal Republic of Yugoslavia)	NED (Netherlands)	SMR (San Marino)	Points

=== 50cc standings ===
Place	Rider	Machine	GER (Germany)	NAT (Italy)	ESP (Spain)	YUG (Socialist Federal Republic of Yugoslavia)	NED (Netherlands)	BEL (Belgium)	SMR (San Marino)	Points
1	(Spain) Ricardo Tormo	Bultaco	Ret	1	1	1	1	1	1	90
2	(Netherlands) Theo Timmer	Bultaco	Ret	5	4	4	4	3	3	65
3	(Switzerland) Stefan Dörflinger	Kreidler	1	2	2	2	Ret			51
4	(Austria) Hans Hummel	Sachs	2	6		8	6	5	5	43
5	(West Germany) Hagen Klein	Kreidler	Ret	3	6	5	5	Ret	6	40
6	(Switzerland) Rolf Blatter	Kreidler	Ret	Ret	5	3	3	4	Ret	39
7	(Netherlands) Henk van Kessel	Kreidler	Ret	Ret	Ret	Ret	2	2	2	36
8	(Italy) Giuseppe Ascareggi	Minarelli		4					4	28
9	(Italy) Claudio Lusuardi	Villa	8	8	7	6			7	23
10	(Netherlands) George Looijesteyn	Kreidler	5	7	Ret		17	6	8	21
11	(West Germany) Rainer Kunz	Kreidler	3				Ret	Ret		20
12	(France) Yves Dupont	ABF	Ret	Ret	3	7	Ret	Ret		14
13	(Spain) Joaquim Gali	Bultaco	12	12	10	9	9	7	9	11
14	(West Germany) Ingo Emmerich	Kreidler	Ret	9	8	Ret	7	21	10	10
15	(Austria) Otto Machinek	Kreidler	4	Ret		Ret	16	20	13	8
16	(West Germany) Kasimer Rapczynski	Kreidler	6			Ret	Ret	22	22	6
17	(France) Pascal Kambourian	Kreidler		10	9			8		6
18	(Germany) Gerhard Bauer	Kreidler	7				12	11		4
19	(Germany) Günter Schirnhofer	Kreidler	Ret	14	12	11	Ret	9	12	4
20	(Netherlands) Jos van Dongen	Kreidler	15				8	15		3
21	(Germany) Klaus Kull	Kreidler	9					26	23	2
22	(Belgium) Chris Baert	Kreidler	19	18	14	10		10	Ret	2
23	(Germany) Herbert Engelhardt	Kreidler	10							1
24	(Germany) Rainer Scheidhauer	Kreidler		Ret		15	10	13		1
	(France) Yves le Toumelin	TYL	11	Ret	11		13			0
	(Socialist Federal Republic of Yugoslavia) Zdravko Matulja	Tomos		11		Ret	Ret	12	Ret	0
	(Italy) Giuliano Gerani	BBFT		16					11	0
	(Netherlands) Floor Maasland	FMT					11			0
	(Germany) Gerhard Singer	Kreidler		Ret	Ret	12	14	19	25	0
	(Switzerland) Joe Genoud	RYB		15	13	18	Ret	14	24	0
	(Spain) Ramon Gali	Kreidler	13		15		15	16	16	0
	(Italy) Salvatore Milano	UFO		13					Ret	0
	(Czechoslovakia) Zbynek Havdra	Kreidler				13				0
	(France) Bruno di Carlo	MDC	16	Ret		14		17		0
	(Italy) Claudio Granata	Kreidler		Ret					14	0
	(Germany) Dieter Göppner	Kreidler	14							0
	(Italy) Giuliano Tabanelli	Ringhini		19					15	0
	(Switzerland) Reiner Koster	Malanca	17	20	16	Ret	20	Ret	21	0
	(Socialist Federal Republic of Yugoslavia) Zlatko Adamovic	Kreidler				16				0
	(Socialist Federal Republic of Yugoslavia) Peter Verbic	Kreidler	18	17		Ret			Ret	0
	(United Kingdom) Spencer Crabbe	MBA		Ret		17		25		0
	(Italy) Enrico Cereda	Kreidler		Ret					17	0
	(Spain) Jose M. Baena	Kreidler			17					0
	(Germany) Thomas Engl	PCR						18	18	0
	(Spain) Vicente Ferrer	Kreidler			18					0
	(Netherlands) Bertus Grinwis	PCR					18			0
	(Netherlands) Jan Welvaarts	Kreidler					19			0
	(Italy) Enzo Saffiotti	UFO							19	0
	(Germany) Henry Nagel	Kreidler	20							0
	(Italy) Pasquale Buonfante	UFO							20	0
	(Netherlands) Paul Rimmelzwaan	Kreidler					21			0
	(Finland) Mika-Sakari Komu	Kreidler						23		0
	(Norway) Ove Skifjeld	Kreidler						24		0
	(Belgium) Dirk van der Donckt	Kreidler						27		0
	(Belgium) Robert Evrard	Kreidler						28		0
	(Socialist Federal Republic of Yugoslavia) Hulric	Kreidler		Ret						0
	(Spain) Daniel Mateos	Kreidler			Ret					0
	(Spain) Alfonso Maner	Kreidler			Ret					0
	(Spain) Pedro Cegarra	Kreidler			Ret					0
	(Spain) Antonio Garcia	Kreidler			Ret					0
	(Netherlands) Hans Spaan	Kreidler				Ret				0
	(Socialist Federal Republic of Yugoslavia) Bojan Miklos	Kreidler				Ret				0
	(Socialist Federal Republic of Yugoslavia) Darko Keletic	Kreidler				Ret				0
	(France) Michel De Poligny	Kreidler				Ret				0
	(Germany) Uli Merz	Kreidler				Ret				0
	(Belgium) Serge Julin	JVM						Ret		0
	(Belgium) Guido Delys	Jumathi						Ret		0
	(Italy) Renzo Fabbri	Kreidler							Ret	0

== Bibliography ==
- Büla, Maurice & Schertenleib, Jean-Claude (2001). Continental Circus 1949-2000. Chronosports S.A. ISBN 2-940125-32-5
- Peter Clifford (1981). Motocourse 1981-82. Hazleton Publishing. ISBN 978-0905138183.
