= 1981 Nations motorcycle Grand Prix =

(Italy) 1981 Nations Grand Prix
Race details
- Race 4 of 12 races in the 1981 Grand Prix motorcycle racing season
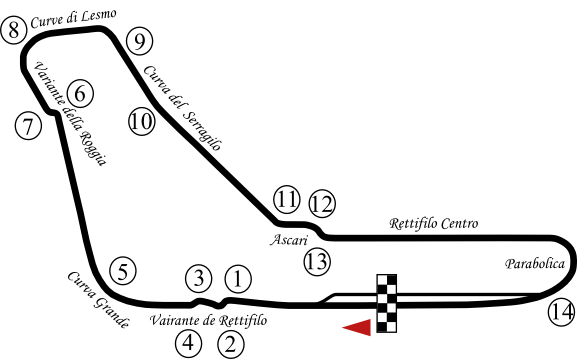
- Date: 10 May 1981
- Official name: Gran Premio delle Nazioni
- Location: Autodromo Nazionale Monza
- Course: Permanent racing facility; 5.800 km (3.604 mi)

500cc
Pole position
- Rider: (Italy) Marco Lucchinelli
- Time: 1:53.960
Fastest lap
- Rider: (Italy) Marco Lucchinelli
- Time: 2:06.900
Podium
- First: (United States) Kenny Roberts
- Second: (New Zealand) Graeme Crosby
- Third: (United Kingdom) Barry Sheene

350cc
Pole position
- Rider: (West Germany) Anton Mang
Fastest lap
- Rider: (South Africa) Jon Ekerold
Podium
- First: (South Africa) Jon Ekerold
- Second: (West Germany) Anton Mang
- Third: (Italy) Massimo Matteoni

250cc
Pole position
- Rider: (West Germany) Anton Mang
- Time: 2:01.520
Fastest lap
- Rider: (West Germany) Anton Mang
- Time: 2:13.810
Podium
- First: (France) Éric Saul
- Second: (Italy) Maurizio Massimiani
- Third: (West Germany) Anton Mang

125cc
Pole position
- Rider: (Italy) Pier Paolo Bianchi
Fastest lap
- Rider: (France) Guy Bertin
- Time: 2:22.810
Podium
- First: (France) Guy Bertin
- Second: (Italy) Loris Reggiani
- Third: (France) Jacques Bolle

50cc
Pole position
- Rider: (Switzerland) Stefan Dörflinger
Fastest lap
- Rider: (Spain) Ricardo Tormo
Podium
- First: (Spain) Ricardo Tormo
- Second: (Switzerland) Stefan Dörflinger
- Third: (West Germany) Hagen Klein

The 1981 Nations motorcycle Grand Prix was the fourth race of the 1981 Grand Prix motorcycle racing season. It took place on the weekend of 8–10 May 1981 at the Autodromo Nazionale Monza.

== Classification ==
=== 500 cc ===
Pos.	Rider	Team	Manufacturer	Time/Retired	Points
1	(United States) Kenny Roberts	Yamaha Motor Company	Yamaha	52'02.100	15
2	(New Zealand) Graeme Crosby	Ingersoll Herin Team Suzuki	Suzuki	+4.650	12
3	(United Kingdom) Barry Sheene		Yamaha	+8.150	10
4	(Netherlands) Boet van Dulmen		Yamaha	+33.480	8
5	(Italy) Marco Lucchinelli	Team Nava Suzuki	Suzuki	+36.170	6
6	(Italy) Guido Paci		Yamaha	+37.120	5
7	(Netherlands) Jack Middelburg	Racing Westland	Suzuki	+1'21.650	4
8	(Italy) Franco Uncini		Suzuki	+1'26.220	3
9	(France) Christian Sarron	Team Sonauto Gauloises	Yamaha	+1'36.480	2
10	(Switzerland) Sergio Pellandini		Suzuki	+1'52.070	1
11	(Italy) Leandro Becheroni		Suzuki	+1'55.910	
12	(Italy) Gianni Rolando		Lombardini	+1 lap	
13	(Italy) Walter Migliorati		Suzuki	+1 lap	
14	(Japan) Sadao Asami		Yamaha	+1 lap	
15	(France) Raymond Roche		Suzuki	+1 lap	
16	(Finland) Seppo Rossi		Suzuki	+1 lap	
17	(United Kingdom) Keith Huewen	Heron Suzuki GB	Suzuki	+1 lap	
18	(Switzerland) Alain Rothlisberger		Suzuki	+2 laps	
19	(New Zealand) Stuart Avant	Ellis Racing	Suzuki	+2 laps	
20	(Italy) Marco Papa		Suzuki	+2 laps	
21	(Sweden) Peter Sjöström		Suzuki	+2 laps	
Ret	(Japan) Takazumi Katayama	Honda International Racing	Honda	Retired	
Ret	(France) Marc Fontan	Team Sonauto Gauloises	Yamaha	Retired	
Ret	(Italy) Fabio Biliotti		Suzuki	Retired	
Ret	(France) Christian Estrosi		Suzuki	Retired	
Ret	(Italy) Virginio Ferrari	Cagiva Corse	Cagiva	Retired	
Ret	(Switzerland) Philippe Coulon		Suzuki	Retired	
Ret	(Italy) Graziano Rossi	Morbidelli	Morbidelli	Retired	
Ret	(Italy) Gianni Pelletier		Suzuki	Retired	
Ret	(South Africa) Kork Ballington	Team Kawasaki	Kawasaki	Retired	
Ret	(West Germany) Gustav Reiner	Team Solitude Deutschland	Solo	Retired	
Ret	(United Kingdom) Dave Potter		Yamaha	Retired	
Ret	(United States) Randy Mamola	Ingersoll Herin Team Suzuki	Suzuki	Retired	
Ret	(Italy) Adelio Faccioli		Suzuki	Retired	
Ret	(Japan) Hiroyuki Kawasaki	Ingersoll Herin Team Suzuki	Suzuki	Retired	
DNS	(United Kingdom) Steve Parrish	Team Mitsui Yamaha	Yamaha	Did not start	
DNS	(Italy) Carlo Perugini	Moto Sanvenero	Sanvenero	Did not start	
DNQ	(France) Franck Gross		Suzuki	Did not qualify	
DNQ	(South Africa) Jon Ekerold	Team Solitude Deutschland	Solo	Did not qualify	
DNQ	(West Germany) Josef Hage	Dieter Braun Team	Yamaha	Did not qualify	
DNQ	(Austria) Michael Schmid		Suzuki	Did not qualify	
DNQ	(Venezuela) Roberto Pietri		Suzuki	Did not qualify	
DNQ	(Brazil) Marco Greco		Yamaha	Did not qualify	

Previous race: 1981 German Grand Prix	FIM Grand Prix World Championship; 1981 season	Next race: 1981 French Grand Prix
Previous race: 1980 Nations Grand Prix	Nations Grand Prix	Next race: 1982 Nations Grand Prix
