= Franco Uncini =

Italian motorcycle racer (born 1955)

- Franco Uncini
- Nationality: Italian
- Born: March 9, 1955 (age 71); Recanati, Province of Macerata
Motorcycle racing career statistics
Grand Prix motorcycle racing
Active years	1976 - 1985
First race	1976 350cc Nations Grand Prix
Last race	1985 500cc San Marino Grand Prix
First win	1977 250cc Nations Grand Prix
Last win	1982 500cc British Grand Prix
Team	Suzuki
Championships	500cc - 1982
Starts / Wins / Podiums / Poles / F. laps / Points; 79 / 7 / 21 / 3 / 3 / 446

Franco Uncini (born 9 March 1955) is an Italian former professional motorcycle road racer. He competed in the FIM Grand Prix motorcycle racing world championships from 1976 to 1985. He won the 1982 world championship with the Roberto Gallina-Suzuki team. He was inducted into the F.I.M. MotoGP Hall of Fame in 2016.

== Career ==
Uncini was born at Recanati, province of Macerata. He made his debut as professional motorcycle road racer in the 750cc class with Laverda, moving later to Ducati, with whom he earned various titles as Italian champion. His first year in the Grand Prix World Championship was with Yamaha in 1976, in both the 250cc and the 350cc classes. The following year he continued to race in both classes, this time with the Harley-Davidson team, winning two Grands Prix in 250cc (Grand Prix of Nations and Czechoslovakia) and finishing second in championship behind Mario Lega. However, his quarrelsome relationship with teammate Walter Villa forced him to move back to Yamaha.

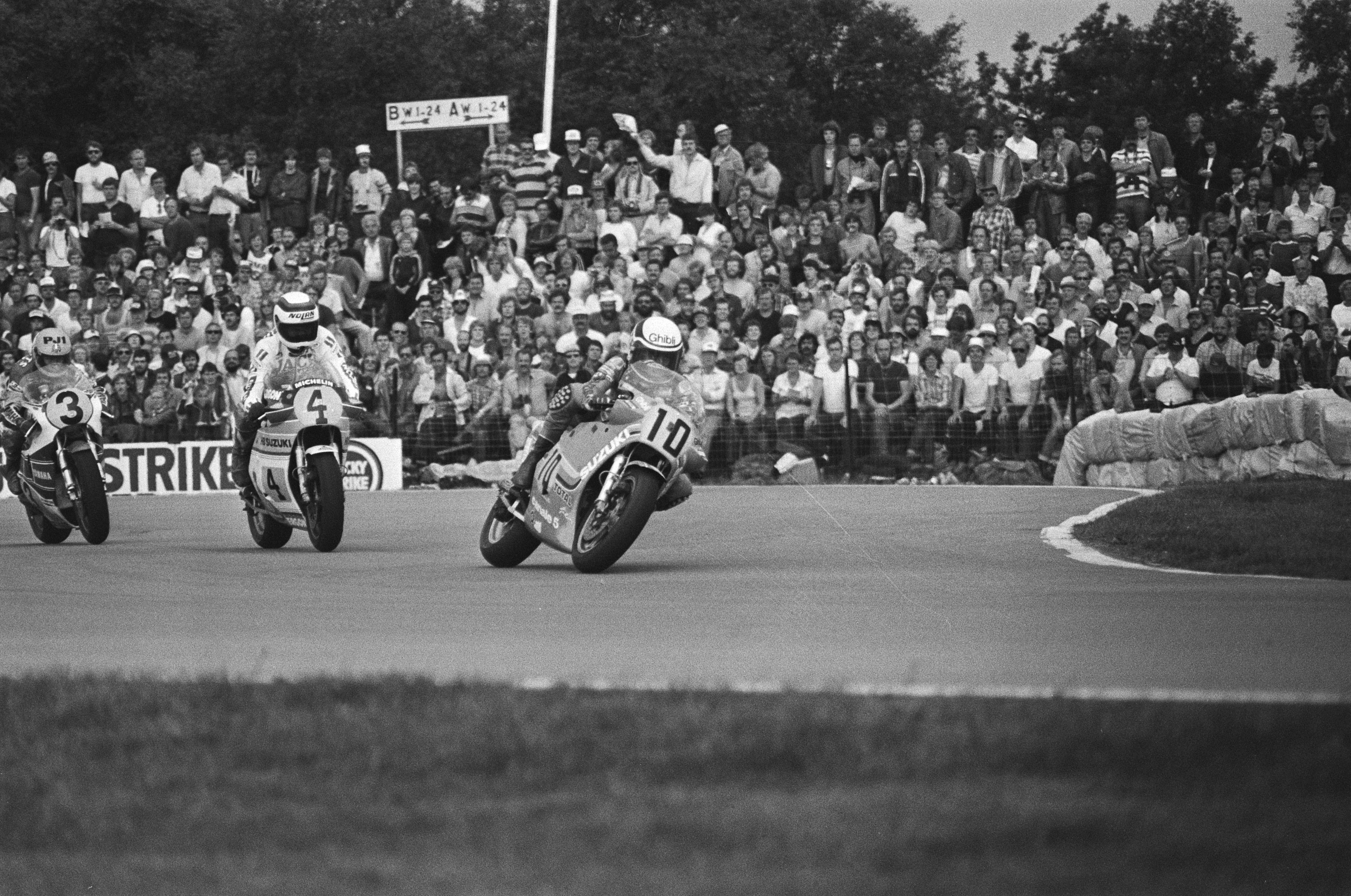
Uncini (10) leads Jack Middelburg (4) and Kenny Roberts (3) at the 1982 Dutch TT

After some disappointing years with a privateer Yamaha team, in 1979, Uncini purchased a Suzuki RG500 and launched a private team of his own in the 500cc class. He was the top-ranking privateer both in 1979 and 1980, with 5th- and 4th-place finishes. Accidents hindered his 1981 season, but after Marco Lucchinelli left Suzuki to join Honda, Suzuki offered Uncini an official factory-sponsored race bike run by Roberto Gallina's team. Finally, with a competitive vehicle, Uncini won the World Championship in 1982, scoring five victories (GPs of Austria, Netherlands, Yugoslavia, Great Britain and GP of Nations). He was the last Italian rider to win the 500cc crown until Valentino Rossi won in 2001, and for almost two decades the last European rider to win 500cc before Alex Criville won his title in 1999.

In 1983, Uncini was severely injured at TT-Assen (The Netherlands), when he fell off his bike and was struck in the head by competitor Wayne Gardner's bike. He went into a coma, but eventually recovered. He retired from motorcycle competition after the 1985 season.

Today, Uncini acts as Fédération Internationale de Motocyclisme Safety Officer in MotoGP.

== Career statistics ==
Grand Prix motorcycle racing results

Points system from 1969 to 1988:

**Position**	1	2	3	4	5	6	7	8	9	10
**Points**	15	12	10	8	6	5	4	3	2	1

(key) (Races in bold indicate pole position; races in italics indicate fastest lap)

Year	Class	Team	1	2	3	4	5	6	7	8	9	10	11	12	13	Points	Rank	Wins
1976	250cc	Yamaha	FRA -		NAT -	IOM -	NED; 10	BEL -	SWE -	FIN -	CZE -	GER -	ESP -			6	21st	0
1976	350cc	Yamaha	FRA -	AUT -	NAT; 2	IOM -	NED; 6			FIN -	CZE -	GER -	ESP; 3			27	9th	0
1977	250cc	Harley Davidson	VEN -	GER; 3	**NAT**; 1	ESP; 13	FRA -	YUG -	NED; 2	BEL; 7	SWE -	FIN; 4	**CZE**; 1	GBR; 4		72	**2nd**	2
1977	350cc	Harley Davidson	VEN -	GER -	NAT; 6	ESP -	FRA -	YUG -	NED; 5		SWE -	FIN -	CZE -	GBR -		11	20th	0
1978	250cc	Yamaha	VEN -	ESP; 3		FRA -	NAT; 3	NED; 4	BEL; 2	SWE -	FIN -	GBR -	GER -	CZE; 9	YUG -	42	8th	0
1978	350cc	Yamaha	VEN -		AUT; 2	FRA -	NAT; 5	NED; 10		SWE -	FIN -	GBR -	GER -	CZE -	YUG -	19	12th	0
1979	500cc	Suzuki	VEN; 4	AUT; 6	GER; 6	NAT -	ESP; 5	YUG; 3	NED; 6	BEL -	SWE -	FIN -	GBR; 7	FRA; 4		51	5th	0
1980	500cc	Suzuki	NAT; 2	ESP; 7	FRA -	NED; 3	BEL; 6	FIN; 3	GBR; 6	GER; 7						50	4th	0
1981	500cc	Suzuki	AUT; 7	GER; 10	NAT; 8	FRA -	YUG; NC	NED -	BEL -	RSM; NC	GBR; 16	FIN; NC	SWE; 7			12	13th	0
1982	500cc	Suzuki	ARG; 4	AUT; 1	FRA; WD	ESP; 3	**NAT**; 1	NED; 1	BEL; 3	YUG; 1	GBR; 1	SWE; NC	RSM; NC	GER; NC		103	**1st**	5
1983	500cc	Suzuki	RSA; 6	FRA; NC	NAT; 4	GER; 5	ESP; 5	AUT; 5	YUG; NC	NED; NC	BEL -	GBR -	SWE -	RSM -		31	9th	0
1984	500cc	Suzuki	RSA; NC	NAT; 5	ESP; NC	AUT; 11	GER; 6	FRA -	YUG -	NED -	BEL -	GBR; 11	SWE; NC	RSM; 8		14	14th	0
1985	500cc	Suzuki	RSA; 11	ESP -	GER; NC	NAT; 8	AUT; 13	YUG; NC	NED; 13	BEL; 13	FRA; 12	GBR; 18	SWE; 15	RSM; 6		8	15th	0
