= Marco Lucchinelli =

Italian motorcycle racer

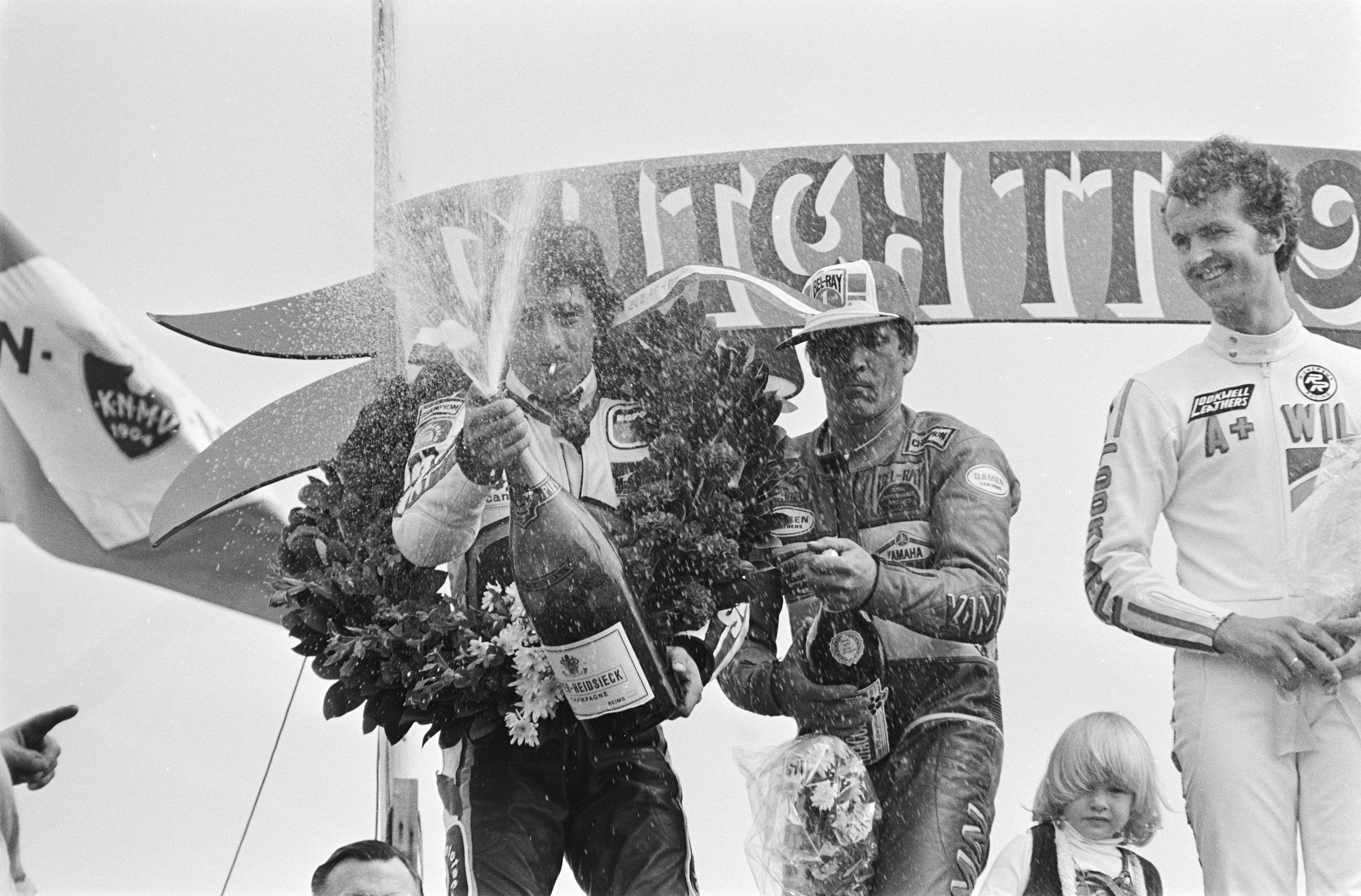
- Marco Lucchinelli in Assen became the 1981 500cc world champion
- Nationality: Italian
- Born: June 26, 1954 (age 72); Bolano, Italy
Motorcycle racing career statistics
Grand Prix motorcycle racing
| Active years | 1975 - 1986 |
| First race | 1975 350cc Nations Grand Prix |
| Last race | 1986 500cc Nations Grand Prix |
| First win | 1980 500cc German Grand Prix |
| Last win | 1981 500cc Finnish Grand Prix |
| Team(s) | Honda, Suzuki, Yamaha, Cagiva |
| Championships | 500cc - 1981 |
Starts / Wins / Podiums / Poles / F. laps / Points; 75 / 6 / 19 / 9 / 9

Marco Lucchinelli (born 26 June 1954) is an Italian former professional motorcycle racer and television sports presenter. He competed in Grand Prix motorcycle racing between 1975 and 1986. He was 1981 FIM Road Racing World Champion as a member of the Gallina-Suzuki racing team. In 2017, Lucchinelli was inducted into the MotoGP Legends Hall of Fame by FIM.

== Career ==
Lucchinelli was born in Bolano.

Lucchinelli began his road racing career in 1975 on a Laverda in endurance racing. His riding impressed the Yamaha factory enough to earn him a sponsored bike in the Italian National Championship as well as a ride in the 1975 Nations Grand Prix in the 350 class.

In 1976, Lucchinelli rode a Suzuki in the 500cc World Championship earning fourth place in the championship with two second-place finishes along with a third and a fourth place. He earned the nickname Crazy Horse for his wild riding style that attracted many fans. This fearless riding style also meant that he crashed quite often. In the 1977 season, he would drop to 11th place in the 500 World Championship on a Yamaha.

Lucchinelli returned to Suzuki for the 1978 season and in 1980, he won his first 500cc Grand Prix at the German Grand Prix at the Nürburgring. He would finish the season in third place behind Kenny Roberts and Randy Mamola.

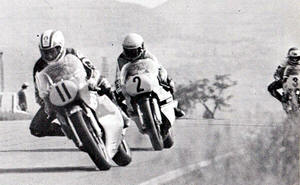
Lucchinelli (n.11) ahead of Kenny Roberts at the 1978 Nations GP at the Mugello circuit

Lucchinelli had his best year in 1981. He began the year with a victory over Kenny Roberts in the prestigious Imola 200 non-championship race in Italy. He then took five Grand Prix victories aboard the Roberto Gallina backed Suzuki, battling Randy Mamola to the final race of the season before winning the 500cc World Championship. In 1982, Lucchinelli accepted a job offer from Honda to race their new three-cylinder NS500 alongside Freddie Spencer and Takazumi Katayama. He would have a lackluster season in which Franco Uncini would win the championship for the Roberto Gallina-Suzuki team for which Lucchinelli had won the title the previous year.

After another lackluster season with Honda in 1983, Lucchinelli joined the Cagiva team for the 1984 and 1985 seasons before he retired from Grand Prix racing. He tried his hand at auto racing, competing in the Italian round of the 1986 Formula 3000 season in a Lola-Ford. Lucchinelli raced a Ducati 851 to a popular win at the 1987 Daytona Battle of the Twins race. In 1988, he joined the Ducati in the Superbike World Championship where he won two races during the year before taking on the role of Ducati's team manager.

On 6 December 1991, Lucchinelli was arrested for drug possession. He spent some time in jail, during which he successfully fought against drug addiction. After retiring, Lucchinelli became a television commentator for the Eurosport network's motorcycle race coverage. He retired with 6 Grand Prix victories. However, he briefly returned from retirement in 1998, entering the 1000 km Monza, and the opening race of the International Sports Racing Series (ISRS), driving for Centenari; he didn't start the 1000 km Monza, and finished sixth overall (second in the CN class) in the opening round of the ISRS.

== Career statistics ==
=== Grand Prix motorcycle racing ===
==== Races by year ====
(key) (Races in bold indicate pole position) (Races in italics indicate fastest lap)

| Year | Class | Bike | 1 | 2 | 3 | 4 | 5 | 6 | 7 | 8 | 9 | 10 | 11 | 12 | Pos. | Pts |
|---|---|---|---|---|---|---|---|---|---|---|---|---|---|---|---|---|
| 1975 | 350cc | Yamaha | FRA | SPA | AUT | GER | NAT; 7 | IOM | NED | FIN | CZE | YUG | | | 32nd | 4 |
| 1976 | 350cc | Yamaha | FRA; Ret | AUT | NAT | YUG | IOM | NED | FIN | CZE | GER | SPA | | | NC | 0 |
| 1976 | 500cc | Suzuki | FRA; 3 | AUT; 2 | NAT; DNS | IOM | NED | BEL | SWE; 15 | FIN; 5 | CZE; Ret | GER; 2 | | | 4th | 40 |
| 1977 | 500cc | Suzuki | VEN; 7 | AUT; DNS | GER; 7 | NAT; Ret | FRA; Ret | NED; 6 | BEL; Ret | SWE; Ret | FIN; 2 | CZE; Ret | GBR | | 11th | 25 |
| 1978 | 350cc | Yamaha | VEN | AUT | FRA | NAT; 6 | NED | SWE | | | | | | | 18th | 5 |
| 1978 | 350cc | Harley-Davidson | | | | | | | FIN; Ret | GBR | GER | CZE | YUG | | 18th | 5 |
| 1978 | 500cc | Suzuki | VEN | SPA; Ret | AUT; 4 | FRA; Ret | NAT; 3 | NED; Ret | BEL; 7 | SWE; Ret | FIN; Ret | GBR; 4 | GER; Ret | | 9th | 30 |
| 1979 | 500cc | Suzuki | VEN | AUT; 9 | GER; Ret | NAT; Ret | SPA; 10 | YUG; Ret | NED; Ret | BEL; DNS | SWE; 7 | FIN; 9 | GBR; 9 | FRA; Ret | 18th | 11 |
| 1980 | 500cc | Suzuki | **NAT**; Ret | SPA; 2 | **FRA**; 3 | NED; Ret | BEL; 2 | FIN; Ret | GBR; 3 | GER; 1 | | | | | 3rd | 59 |
| 1981 | 500cc | Suzuki | AUT; Ret | GER; 3 | **NAT**; 5 | **FRA**; 1 | **YUG**; 2 | **NED**; 1 | **BEL**; 1 | **RSM**; 1 | GBR; 19 | **FIN**; 1 | SWE; 9 | | 1st | 105 |
| 1982 | 500cc | Honda | ARG; 5 | AUT; Ret | FRA; DNS | SPA; 5 | NAT; 5 | NED; Ret | BEL; 6 | YUG; 8 | GBR; 17 | SWE; 5 | RSM; 6 | GER; 5 | 8th | 43 |
| 1983 | 500cc | Honda | RSA; 9 | FRA; 2 | NAT; 10 | GER; 3 | SPA; Ret | AUT; 7 | YUG; 9 | NED; Ret | BEL; 7 | GBR; Ret | SWE; 6 | RSM; 4 | 7th | 48 |
| 1984 | 500cc | Cagiva | RSA; Ret | NAT; Ret | SPA; Ret | AUT; Ret | GER | FRA; DNS | YUG | NED; Ret | BEL | GBR | SWE | RSM | NC | 0 |
| 1985 | 500cc | Cagiva | RSA | SPA | GER | NAT | AUT | YUG; 15 | NED; Ret | BEL; Ret | FRA | GBR | SWE | RSM; Ret | NC | 0 |
| 1986 | 500cc | Cagiva | SPA | NAT; Ret | GER | AUT | YUG | NED | BEL | FRA | GBR | SWE | RSM | | NC | 0 |

=== Superbike World Championship ===
==== Races by year ====
(key) (Races in bold indicate pole position) (Races in italics indicate fastest lap)

| Year | Make | 1 | | 2 | | 3 | | 4 | | 5 | | 6 | | 7 | | 8 | | 9 | | 10 | | 11 | | Pos. | Pts |
| Year | Make | R1 | R2 | R1 | R2 | R1 | R2 | R1 | R2 | R1 | R2 | R1 | R2 | R1 | R2 | R1 | R2 | R1 | R2 | R1 | R2 | R1 | R2 | Pos. | Pts |
|---|---|---|---|---|---|---|---|---|---|---|---|---|---|---|---|---|---|---|---|---|---|---|---|---|---|
| 1988 | Ducati | GBR; 2 | GBR; 1 | HUN; 9 | HUN; Ret | GER; 6 | GER; 11 | AUT; 1 | AUT; Ret | **JPN**; 12 | **JPN**; Ret | **FRA**; 10 | **FRA**; C | POR; 3 | POR; 4 | AUS | AUS | NZL | NZL | | | | | 5th | 63 |
| 1989 | Ducati | GBR | GBR | HUN | HUN | CAN | CAN | USA | USA | AUT | AUT | FRA | FRA | JPN; DNS | JPN; DNS | GER; Ret | GER; 10 | ITA; 9 | ITA; DNS | AUS | AUS | NZL | NZL | 42nd | 13 |
