= 1981 German motorcycle Grand Prix =

Hockenheimring racing competition

(West Germany) 1981 German Grand Prix
Race details
- Race 3 of 14 races in the 1981 Grand Prix motorcycle racing season
- Date: 3 May 1981
- Official name: Großer Preis von Deutschland
- Location: Hockenheimring
- Course: Permanent racing facility; 6.789 km (4.218 mi)

500cc
Pole position
- Rider: (New Zealand) Graeme Crosby
- Time: 2:12.450
Fastest lap
- Rider: (United States) Kenny Roberts
- Time: 2:10.550
Podium
- First: (United States) Kenny Roberts
- Second: (United States) Randy Mamola
- Third: (Italy) Marco Lucchinelli

350cc
Pole position
- Rider: (France) Patrick Fernandez
- Time: 2:17.790
Fastest lap
- Rider: Unknown
Podium
- First: (West Germany) Anton Mang
- Second: (France) Éric Saul
- Third: (France) Thierry Espié

250cc
Pole position
- Rider: (West Germany) Anton Mang
- Time: 2:22.510
Fastest lap
- Rider: Unknown
Podium
- First: (West Germany) Anton Mang
- Second: (Venezuela) Carlos Lavado
- Third: (Switzerland) Roland Freymond

125cc
Pole position
- Rider: (Spain) Ángel Nieto
- Time: 2:31.640
Fastest lap
- Rider: Unknown
Podium
- First: (Spain) Ángel Nieto
- Second: (Switzerland) Stefan Dörflinger
- Third: (Switzerland) Hans Müller

50cc
Pole position
- Rider: (Switzerland) Stefan Dörflinger
- Time: 2:49.690
Fastest lap
- Rider: Unknown
Podium
- First: (Italy) Eugenio Lazzarini
- Second: (Austria) Hans-Jürgen Hummel
- Third: (West Germany) Rainer Kunz

The 1981 German motorcycle Grand Prix was the third round of the 1981 Grand Prix motorcycle racing season. It took place on the weekend of 1–3 May 1981 at the Hockenheimring.

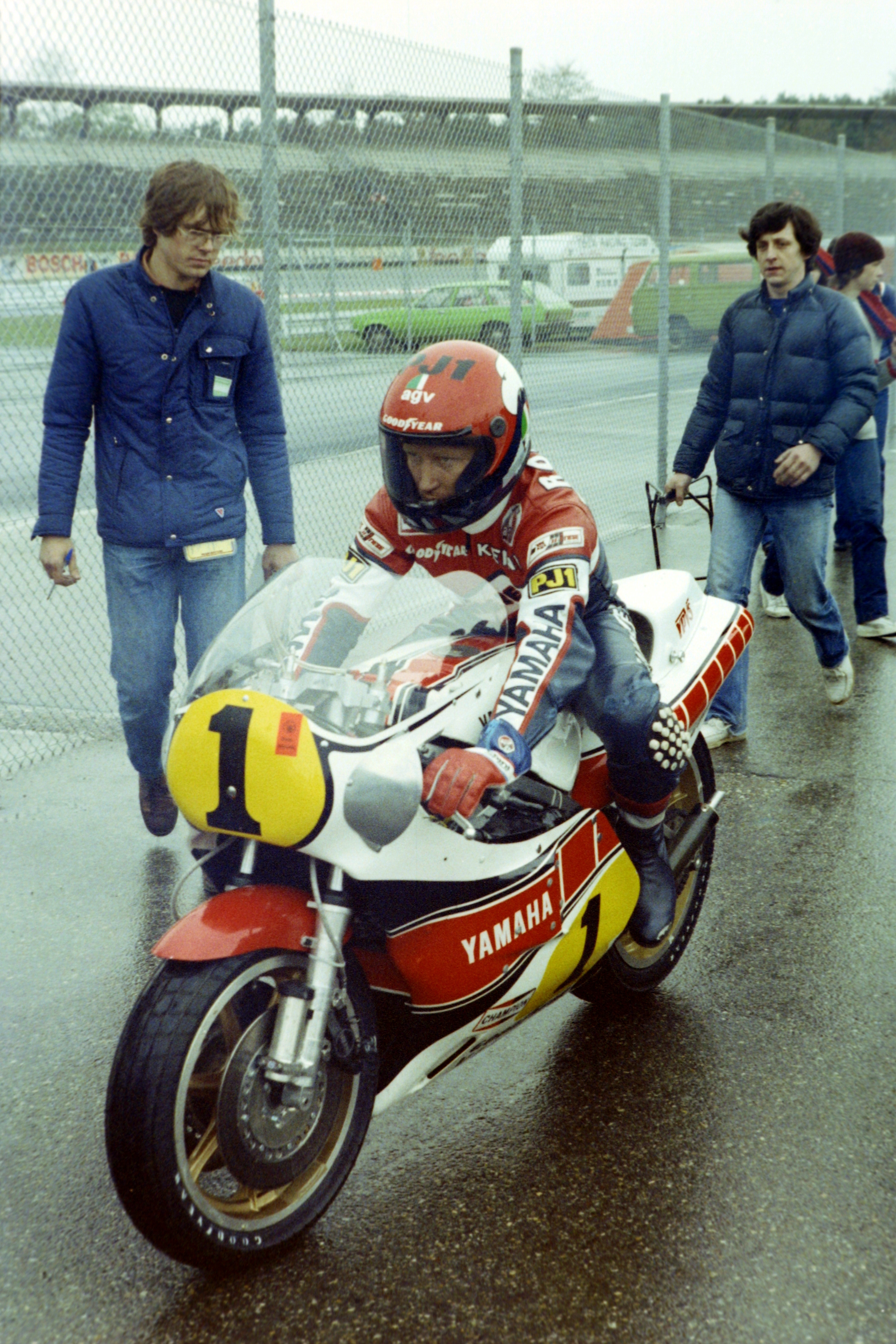
Eventual race winner Kenny Roberts on his bike at the 500cc race.

== Classification ==
=== 500 cc ===
Pos.	Rider	Team	Manufacturer	Time/Retired	Points
1	(United States) Kenny Roberts	Yamaha Motor Company	Yamaha	42'04.700	15
2	(United States) Randy Mamola	Ingersoll Herin Team Suzuki	Suzuki	+0.440	12
3	(Italy) Marco Lucchinelli	Team Nava Suzuki	Suzuki	+0.690	10
4	(Netherlands) Boet van Dulmen		Yamaha	+16.970	8
5	(Switzerland) Michel Frutschi	Elf Motor Racing Team	Yamaha	+31.610	6
6	(United Kingdom) Barry Sheene		Yamaha	+32.560	5
7	(Japan) Hiroyuki Kawasaki	Ingersoll Herin Team Suzuki	Suzuki	+35.390	4
8	(Netherlands) Jack Middelburg	Racing Westland	Suzuki	+39.760	3
9	(France) Marc Fontan	Team Sonauto Gauloises	Yamaha	+50.940	2
10	(Italy) Franco Uncini		Suzuki	+53.230	1
11	(Japan) Sadao Asami		Yamaha Motor Company	+1'02.440	
12	(Switzerland) Philippe Coulon		Suzuki	+1'04.070	
13	(New Zealand) Graeme Crosby	Ingersoll Herin Team Suzuki	Suzuki	+1'05.060	
14	(Netherlands) Wil Hartog	Riemersma Racing	Suzuki	+1'28.720	
15	(France) Raymond Roche		Suzuki	+1'30.590	
16	(Finland) Kimmo Kopra		Suzuki	+1'30.850	
17	(Sweden) Peter Sjöström		Suzuki	+1'34.310	
18	(Italy) Walter Migliorati		Suzuki	+1'36.390	
19	(France) Christian Estrosi		Suzuki	+1'40.010	
20	(Netherlands) Henk de Vries	Henk de Vries Motoren	Suzuki	+2'01.840	
21	(Switzerland) Sergio Pellandini		Suzuki	+2'05.110	
22	(Switzerland) Alain Rothlisberger		Suzuki	+1 lap	
23	(West Germany) Josef Hage	Dieter Braun Team	Yamaha	+1 lap	
24	(Austria) Michael Schmid		Suzuki	+1 lap	
25	(France) Bernard Fau		Yamaha	+1 lap	
26	(France) Dominique Pernet		Yamaha	+1 lap	
27	(West Germany) Gerhard Vogt		Seel-Suzuki	+1 lap	
28	(West Germany) Gunter Dreier		Yamaha	+1 lap	
29	(Brazil) Marco Greco		Yamaha	+1 lap	
30	(Italy) Virginio Ferrari	Cagiva Corse	Cagiva	+1 lap	
Ret	(United Kingdom) Dave Potter		Suzuki	Retired	
Ret	(South Africa) Kork Ballington	Team Kawasaki	Kawasaki	Retired	
Ret	(New Zealand) Stuart Avant	Ellis Racing	Suzuki	Retired	
Ret	(West Germany) Klaus Klein		Suzuki	Retired	
Ret	(Finland) Seppo Rossi		Suzuki	Retired	
Ret	(Japan) Takazumi Katayama	Honda International Racing	Honda	Retired	
Ret	(United States) Mike Baldwin		Yamaha	Retired	
Ret	(South Africa) Jon Ekerold	Team Solitude Deutschland	Solo	Retired	
Ret	(Austria) Stefan Klabacher	Saga Racing	Yamaha	Retired	
Ret	(Switzerland) Wolfgang von Muralt		Yamaha	Retired	
Ret	(United Kingdom) Keith Huewen	Heron Suzuki GB	Suzuki	Retired	
Ret	(Italy) Adelio Faccioli		Suzuki	Retired	
Ret	(Switzerland) Andreas Hofmann		Suzuki	Retired	
Ret	(France) Jean Lafond		Yamaha	Retired	
DNS	(United States) Dale Singleton	Beaulieu Racing	Suzuki	Did not start	
DNS	(France) Christian Sarron	Team Sonauto Gauloises	Yamaha	Did not start	

Previous race: 1981 Austrian Grand Prix	FIM Grand Prix World Championship; 1981 season	Next race: 1981 Nations Grand Prix
Previous race: 1980 German Grand Prix	German Grand Prix	Next race: 1982 German Grand Prix
