= Siroko =

Siroko Σιρόκο
- Settlement
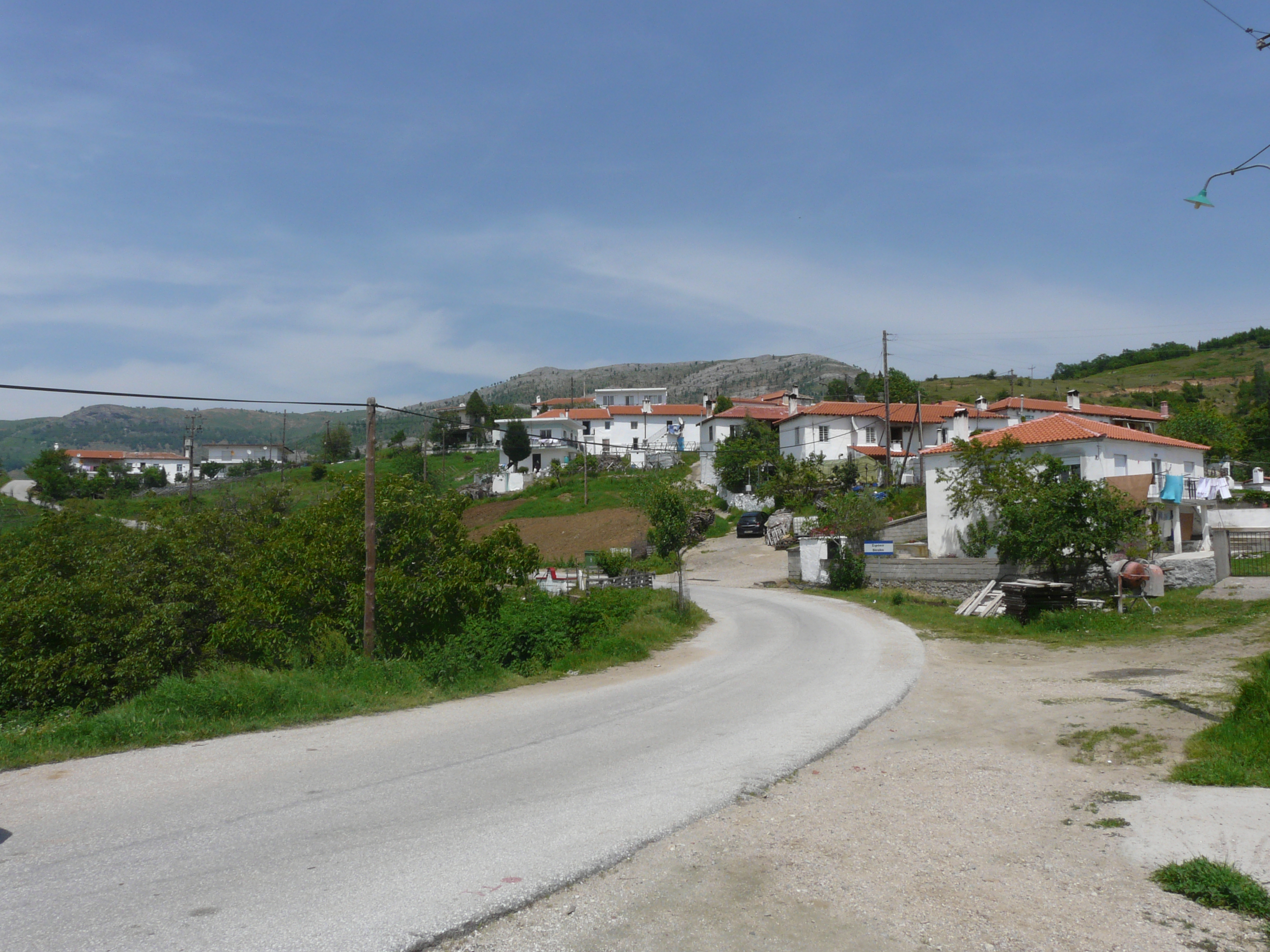

- Location within Greece
- Coordinates: 41.18°N 24.89°E
- Country: Greece
- Administrative region: East Macedonia and Thrace
- Regional unit: Xanthi
- Municipality: Myki
- Municipal unit: Myki
- Community: Myki

Population (2021)
  - Total: 112
- Time zone: UTC+2 (EET)
  - Summer (DST): UTC+3 (EEST)

Siroko (Greek: Σιρόκο, Bulgarian: Широка поляна) is a settlement in the Xanthi regional unit of Greece located south of Sminthi. It is part of the community of Myki. In 2021, the population of the settlement was 112 inhabitants.
