= 1981 Dutch TT =

(Netherlands) 1981 Dutch TT
Race details
- Race 8 of 14 races in the 1981 Grand Prix motorcycle racing season
- Date: 27 June 1981
- Official name: Dutch TT Assen
- Location: TT Circuit Assen
- Course: Permanent racing facility; 7.685 km (4.775 mi)

500cc
Pole position
- Rider: (Italy) Marco Lucchinelli
- Time: 2:51.400
Fastest lap
- Rider: (South Africa) Kork Ballington
- Time: 3:04.370
Podium
- First: (Italy) Marco Lucchinelli
- Second: (Netherlands) Boet van Dulmen
- Third: (South Africa) Kork Ballington

350cc
Pole position
- Rider: Unknown
Fastest lap
- Rider: Unknown
Podium
- First: (West Germany) Anton Mang
- Second: (Venezuela) Carlos Lavado
- Third: (France) Jean-François Baldé

250cc
Pole position
- Rider: Unknown
Fastest lap
- Rider: Unknown
Podium
- First: (West Germany) Anton Mang
- Second: (Venezuela) Carlos Lavado
- Third: (France) Patrick Fernandez

125cc
Pole position
- Rider: Unknown
Fastest lap
- Rider: Unknown
Podium
- First: (Spain) Ángel Nieto
- Second: (Italy) Loris Reggiani
- Third: (Italy) Pier Paolo Bianchi

50cc
Pole position
- Rider: Unknown
Fastest lap
- Rider: Unknown
Podium
- First: (Spain) Ricardo Tormo
- Second: (Netherlands) Henk van Kessel
- Third: (Switzerland) Rolf Blatter

The 1981 Dutch TT was the eighth round of the 1981 Grand Prix motorcycle racing season. It took place on the weekend of 26–27 June 1981 at the TT Circuit Assen located in Assen, Netherlands.

== Classification ==
=== 500 cc ===
Pos.	Rider	Team	Manufacturer	Time/Retired	Points
1	(Italy) Marco Lucchinelli	Team Nava Suzuki	Suzuki	50'16.050	15
2	(Netherlands) Boet van Dulmen		Yamaha	+32.890	12
3	(South Africa) Kork Ballington	Team Kawasaki	Kawasaki	+37.950	10
4	(Netherlands) Willem Zoet	Stimorol Racing	Suzuki	+42.330	8
5	(Netherlands) Jack Middelburg	Racing Westland	Suzuki	+1'14.620	6
6	(United Kingdom) Dave Potter		Yamaha	+1'21.340	5
7	(France) Bernard Fau		Yamaha	+1'38.280	4
8	(Switzerland) Sergio Pellandini		Suzuki	+1'41.620	3
9	(Italy) Guido Paci		Yamaha	+2'14.340	2
10	(Japan) Sadao Asami		Yamaha	+2'28.620	1
11	(Finland) Seppo Rossi		Suzuki	+2'31.490	
12	(Netherlands) Dick Alblas	Hollande Isolatie	Suzuki	+2'36.790	
13	(France) Marc Fontan	Team Sonauto Gauloises	Yamaha	+2'37.430	
14	(Australia) Gregg Hansford	Team Kawasaki Australia	Kawasaki	+2'37.890	
15	(Switzerland) Philippe Coulon		Suzuki	+2'39.260	
16	(Switzerland) Michel Frutschi	Elf Motor Racing Team	Yamaha	+1 lap	
17	(France) Christian Sarron	Team Sonauto Gauloises	Yamaha	+1 lap	
18	(United Kingdom) Steve Parrish	Team Mitsui Yamaha	Yamaha	+1 lap	
19	(New Zealand) Stuart Avant	Ellis Racing	Suzuki	+1 lap	
20	(Finland) Kimmo Kopra		Suzuki	+1 lap	
Ret	(Japan) Takazumi Katayama	Honda International Racing	Honda	Retired	
Ret	(Italy) Gianni Pelletier		Morbidelli	Retired	
Ret	(France) Christian Estrosi		Suzuki	Retired	
Ret	(United States) Dale Singleton	Beaulieu Racing	Suzuki	Retired	
Ret	(United States) Randy Mamola	Ingersoll Herin Team Suzuki	Suzuki	Accident	
Ret	(Italy) Franco Uncini		Suzuki	Retired	
Ret	(Italy) Graziano Rossi	Morbidelli	Morbidelli	Retired	
Ret	(New Zealand) Graeme Crosby	Ingersoll Herin Team Suzuki	Suzuki	Accident	
Ret	(United Kingdom) Barry Sheene		Yamaha	Retired	
DNS	(United States) Kenny Roberts	Yamaha Motor Company	Yamaha	Did not start	
DNQ	(Italy) Carlo Perugini	Moto Sanvenero	Sanvenero	Did not qualify	
DNQ	(United Kingdom) Keith Huewen	Heron Suzuki GB	Suzuki	Did not qualify	
DNQ	(Italy) Virginio Ferrari	Cagiva Corse	Cagiva	Did not qualify	
DNQ	(West Germany) Josef Hage	Dieter Braun Team	Yamaha	Did not qualify	
DNQ	(Netherlands) Henk de Vries	Henk de Vries Motoren	Suzuki	Did not qualify	
DNQ	(Netherlands) Rob Punt		Suzuki	Did not qualify	
DNQ	(France) Franck Gross		Suzuki	Did not qualify	

Previous race: 1981 Yugoslavian Grand Prix	FIM Grand Prix World Championship; 1981 season	Next race: 1981 Belgian Grand Prix
Previous race: 1980 Dutch TT	Dutch TT	Next race: 1982 Dutch TT
