= 1981 British motorcycle Grand Prix =

(United Kingdom) 1981 British Grand Prix
Race details
- Race 11 of 14 races in the 1981 Grand Prix motorcycle racing season
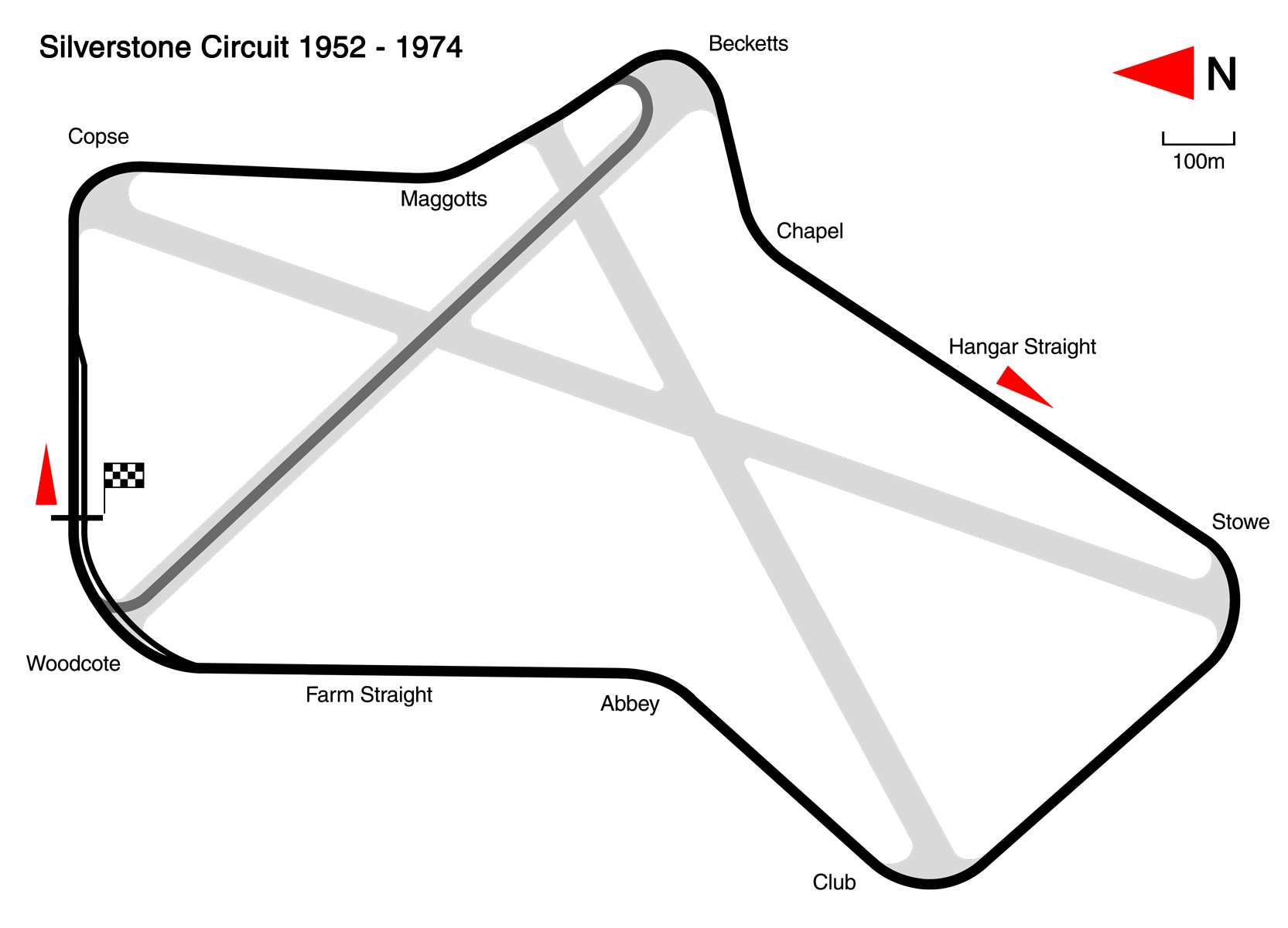
- Date: 2 August 1981
- Official name: Marlboro British Grand Prix
- Location: Silverstone Circuit
- Course: Permanent racing facility; 4.711 km (2.927 mi)

500cc
Pole position
- Rider: (New Zealand) Graeme Crosby
- Time: 1:30.400
Fastest lap
- Rider: Randy Mamola and Kork Ballington
- Time: 1:31.400
Podium
- First: (Netherlands) Jack Middelburg
- Second: (United States) Kenny Roberts
- Third: (United States) Randy Mamola

350cc
Pole position
- Rider: (West Germany) Anton Mang
- Time: 1:33.500
Fastest lap
- Rider: Unknown
Podium
- First: (West Germany) Anton Mang
- Second: (United Kingdom) Keith Huewen
- Third: (France) Jean-François Baldé

250cc
Pole position
- Rider: (West Germany) Anton Mang
- Time: 1:34.900
Fastest lap
- Rider: Unknown
Podium
- First: (West Germany) Anton Mang
- Second: (Switzerland) Roland Freymond
- Third: (Australia) Graeme McGregor

125cc
Pole position
- Rider: (France) Jacques Bolle
- Time: 1:42.510
Fastest lap
- Rider: Unknown
Podium
- First: (Spain) Ángel Nieto
- Second: (France) Jacques Bolle
- Third: (Italy) Hugo Vignetti

50cc
Pole position
- Rider: No 50cc race was held
Fastest lap
- Rider: No 50cc race was held
Podium
- First: No 50cc race was held
- Second: No 50cc race was held
- Third: No 50cc race was held

The 1981 British motorcycle Grand Prix was the eleventh round of the 1981 Grand Prix motorcycle racing season. It took place on the weekend of 31–2 August 1981 at the Silverstone Circuit.

== Classification ==
=== 500 cc ===
Pos.	Rider	Team	Manufacturer	Time/Retired	Points
1	(Netherlands) Jack Middelburg	Racing Westland	Suzuki	43'24.340	15
2	(United States) Kenny Roberts	Yamaha Motor Company	Yamaha	+0.300	12
3	(United States) Randy Mamola	Ingersoll Herin Team Suzuki	Suzuki	+13.040	10
4	(France) Bernard Fau		Yamaha	+36.220	8
5	(France) Marc Fontan	Team Sonauto Gauloises	Yamaha	+36.560	6
6	(Netherlands) Boet van Dulmen		Yamaha	+37.790	5
7	(New Zealand) Stuart Avant	Ellis Racing	Suzuki	+44.950	4
8	(Japan) Ikujiro Takai		Yamaha	+45.410	3
9	(United Kingdom) Steve Parrish	Team Mitsui Yamaha	Yamaha	+45.790	2
10	(United Kingdom) Chris Guy		Suzuki	+53.360	1
11	(Italy) Graziano Rossi		Yamaha	+1'06.370	
12	(Sweden) Peter Sjöström		Suzuki	+1'13.310	
13	(Italy) Guido Paci		Yamaha	+1'14.280	
14	(Venezuela) Roberto Pietri		Suzuki	+1'24.220	
15	(Switzerland) Andreas Hofmann		Suzuki	+1'25.010	
16	(Italy) Franco Uncini		Suzuki	+1 lap	
17	(United Kingdom) Graham Wood		Yamaha	+1 lap	
18	(France) Christian Sarron	Team Sonauto Gauloises	Yamaha	+1 lap	
19	(Italy) Marco Lucchinelli	Team Nava Suzuki	Suzuki	+1 lap	
20	(United Kingdom) Alex George		Yamaha	+1 lap	
21	(United Kingdom) Barry Woodland		Lombardini	+1 lap	
22	(Italy) Carlo Perugini	Moto Sanvenero	Sanvenero	+1 lap	
NC	(United Kingdom) Dave Potter		Yamaha	Not classified	
NC	(Japan) Sadao Asami		Yamaha	Not classified	
Ret	(United States) Freddie Spencer		Honda	Retired	
Ret	(France) Christian Estrosi		Pernod	Retired	
Ret	(United Kingdom) Keith Huewen	Heron Suzuki GB	Suzuki	Retired	
Ret	(Switzerland) Philippe Coulon		Suzuki	Retired	
Ret	(Switzerland) Michel Frutschi	Elf Motor Racing Team	Yamaha	Retired	
Ret	(Switzerland) Sergio Pellandini		Suzuki	Retired	
Ret	(United Kingdom) Gary Lingham		Suzuki	Retired	
Ret	(United States) Dale Singleton	Beaulieu Racing	Suzuki	Retired	
Ret	(United Kingdom) Steve Henshaw		Suzuki	Retired	
Ret	(New Zealand) Graeme Crosby	Ingersoll Herin Team Suzuki	Suzuki	Retired	
Ret	(New Zealand) Dennis Ireland		Suzuki	Retired	
Ret	(Italy) Corrado Tuzii		Suzuki	Retired	
Ret	(United Kingdom) John Newbold		Suzuki	Retired	
Ret	(United Kingdom) Barry Sheene		Yamaha	Retired	
Ret	(South Africa) Kork Ballington	Team Kawasaki	Kawasaki	Retired	

Previous race: 1981 San Marino Grand Prix	FIM Grand Prix World Championship; 1981 season	Next race: 1981 Finnish Grand Prix
Previous race: 1980 British Grand Prix	British Grand Prix	Next race: 1982 British Grand Prix
