= 1981 Yugoslavian motorcycle Grand Prix =

(Socialist Federal Republic of Yugoslavia) 1981 Yugoslavian Grand Prix
Race details
- Race 7 of 14 races in the 1981 Grand Prix motorcycle racing season
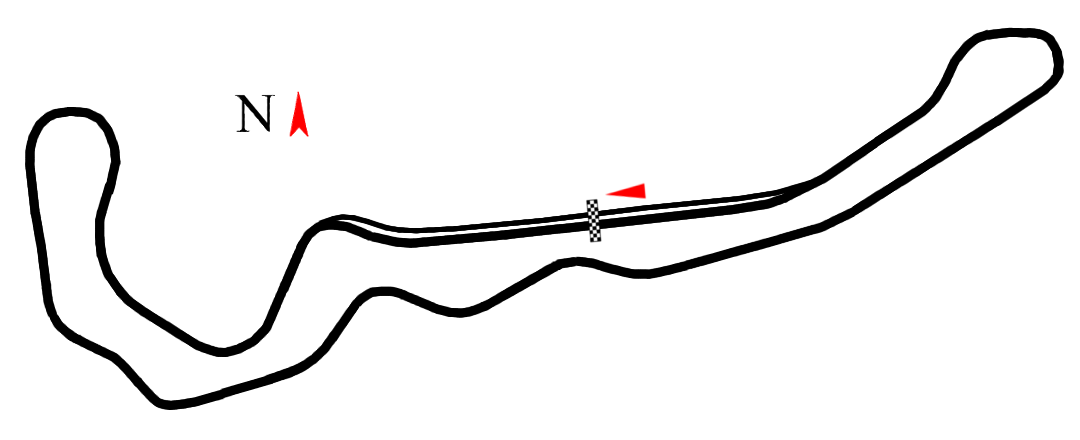
- Date: 31 May 1981
- Official name: Yu Grand Prix
- Location: Automotodrom Rijeka
- Course: Permanent racing facility; 4.168 km (2.590 mi)

500cc
Pole position
- Rider: (Italy) Marco Lucchinelli
- Time: 1:34.100
Fastest lap
- Rider: (Italy) Marco Lucchinelli
- Time: 1:34.500
Podium
- First: (United States) Randy Mamola
- Second: (Italy) Marco Lucchinelli
- Third: (United States) Kenny Roberts

350cc
Pole position
- Rider: (West Germany) Anton Mang
Fastest lap
- Rider: (West Germany) Anton Mang
- Time: 1:36.900
Podium
- First: (West Germany) Anton Mang
- Second: (South Africa) Jon Ekerold
- Third: (Venezuela) Carlos Lavado

250cc
Pole position
- Rider: No 250cc race was held
Fastest lap
- Rider: No 250cc race was held
Podium
- First: No 250cc race was held
- Second: No 250cc race was held
- Third: No 250cc race was held

125cc
Pole position
- Rider: (Italy) Pier Paolo Bianchi
- Time: 1:42.400
Fastest lap
- Rider: (Italy) Pier Paolo Bianchi
- Time: 1:43.000
Podium
- First: (Italy) Loris Reggiani
- Second: (Italy) Pier Paolo Bianchi
- Third: (West Germany) Hans Müller

50cc
Pole position
- Rider: (Switzerland) Stefan Dörflinger
Fastest lap
- Rider: (Spain) Ricardo Tormo
- Time: 1:51.500
Podium
- First: (Spain) Ricardo Tormo
- Second: (Switzerland) Stefan Dörflinger
- Third: (Switzerland) Rolf Blatter

The 1981 Yugoslavian motorcycle Grand Prix was the seventh round of the 1981 Grand Prix motorcycle racing season. It took place on the weekend of 29–31 May 1981 at the Automotodrom Rijeka.

== Classification ==
=== 500 cc ===
Pos.	Rider	Team	Manufacturer	Time/Retired	Points
1	(United States) Randy Mamola	Heron-Suzuki	Suzuki	51'07.300	15
2	(Italy) Marco Lucchinelli	Nava Gallina-Suzuki	Suzuki	+0.900	12
3	(United States) Kenny Roberts	Yamaha International	Yamaha	+7.800	10
4	(New Zealand) Graeme Crosby	Heron Suzuki	Suzuki	+12.700	8
5	(United Kingdom) Barry Sheene	Yamaha International	Yamaha	+22.500	6
6	(Italy) Gianni Pelletier		Suzuki	+1'13.500	5
7	(Netherlands) Boet van Dulmen	IMN Yamaha	Yamaha	+1'25.200	4
8	(Finland) Seppo Rossi		Suzuki	+1 lap	3
9	(Italy) Guido Paci		Yamaha	+1 lap	2
10	(Finland) Kimmo Kopra		Suzuki	+1 lap	1
11	(France) Dominique Pernet		Yamaha	+1 lap	
12	(France) Bernard Fau		Yamaha	+1 lap	
13	(Switzerland) Alain Rothlisberger		Suzuki	+1 lap	
14	(Netherlands) Willem Zoet	Stimorol Racing	Suzuki	+1 lap	
15	(France) Franck Gross		Suzuki	+1 lap	
16	(Denmark) Børge Nielsen		Suzuki	+1 lap	
17	(West Germany) Josef Hage	Dieter Braun Team	Yamaha	+1 lap	
18	(Brazil) Marco Greco		Yamaha	+1 lap	
19	(Italy) Carlo Perugini	Moto Sanvenero	Sanvenero	+2 laps	
20	(Austria) Michael Schmid		Suzuki	+2 laps	
Ret	(South Africa) Jon Ekerold	Team Solitude Deutschland	Solo	Retired	
Ret	(Japan) Sadao Asami		Yamaha	Retired	
Ret	(Switzerland) Philippe Coulon		Suzuki	Retired	
Ret	(Italy) Virginio Ferrari	Cagiva Corse	Cagiva	Accident	
Ret	(France) Marc Fontan	Team Sonauto Gauloises	Yamaha	Accident	
Ret	(Switzerland) Sergio Pellandini		Suzuki	Retired	
Ret	(Italy) Franco Uncini		Suzuki	Retired	
Ret	(Italy) Walter Migliorati		Suzuki	Retired	
Ret	(Italy) Sergio Bertocchi		Suzuki	Retired	
Ret	(France) Christian Estrosi		Suzuki	Retired	
Ret	(Italy) Graziano Rossi	Morbidelli	Morbidelli	Retired	
Ret	(Italy) Gianni Rolando		Lombardini	Retired	
Ret	(United States) Mike Baldwin		Yamaha	Accident	
DNS	(South Africa) Kork Ballington	Team Kawasaki	Kawasaki	Did not start	
DNS	(Netherlands) Jack Middelburg	Racing Westland	Suzuki	Did not start	

Previous race: 1981 Spanish Grand Prix	FIM Grand Prix World Championship; 1981 season	Next race: 1981 Dutch TT
Previous race: 1980 Yugoslavian Grand Prix	Yugoslavian Grand Prix	Next race: 1982 Yugoslavian Grand Prix
