= 1981 Finnish motorcycle Grand Prix =

(Finland) 1981 Finnish Grand Prix
Race details
- Race 12 of 14 races in the 1981 Grand Prix motorcycle racing season
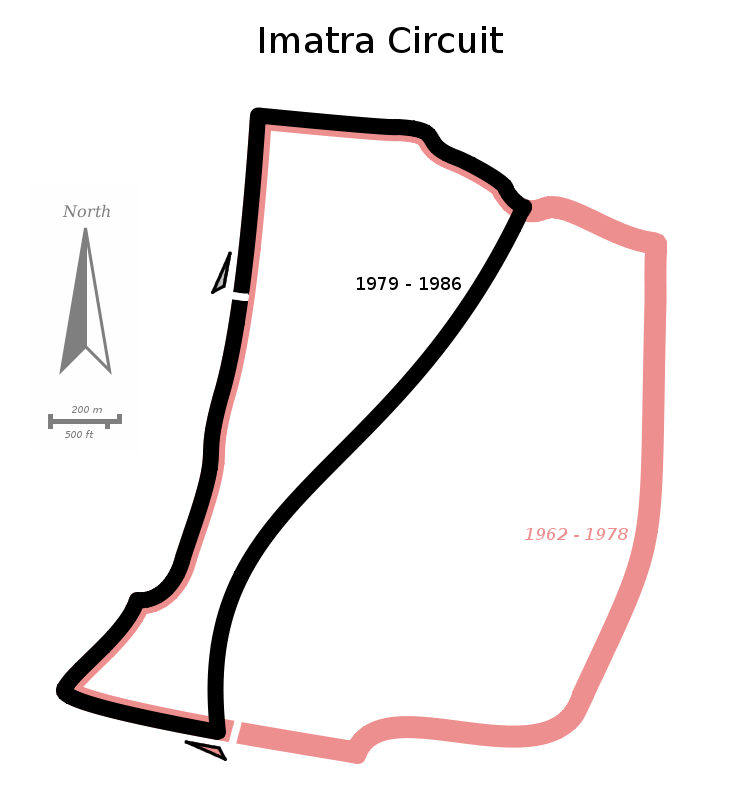
- Date: 9 August 1981
- Official name: Finnish GP
- Location: Imatra Circuit
- Course: Permanent racing facility; 4.950 km (3.076 mi)

500cc
Pole position
- Rider: (Italy) Marco Lucchinelli
- Time: 1:53.800
Fastest lap
- Rider: (Italy) Marco Lucchinelli
- Time: 1:54.000
Podium
- First: (Italy) Marco Lucchinelli
- Second: (United States) Randy Mamola
- Third: (South Africa) Kork Ballington

350cc
Pole position
- Rider: No 350cc race was held
Fastest lap
- Rider: No 350cc race was held
Podium
- First: No 350cc race was held
- Second: No 350cc race was held
- Third: No 350cc race was held

250cc
Pole position
- Rider: (West Germany) Anton Mang
- Time: 2.00.700
Fastest lap
- Rider: Unknown
Podium
- First: (West Germany) Anton Mang
- Second: (France) Jean-François Baldé
- Third: (France) Jean-Louis Guignabodet

125cc
Pole position
- Rider: (Italy) Pier Paolo Bianchi
- Time: 2:08.800
Fastest lap
- Rider: Unknown
Podium
- First: (Spain) Ángel Nieto
- Second: (France) Jacques Bolle
- Third: (Italy) Maurizio Vitali

50cc
Pole position
- Rider: No 50cc race was held
Fastest lap
- Rider: No 50cc race was held
Podium
- First: No 50cc race was held
- Second: No 50cc race was held
- Third: No 50cc race was held

The 1981 Finnish motorcycle Grand Prix was the twelfth round of the 1981 Grand Prix motorcycle racing season. It took place on the weekend of 7–9 August 1981 at the Imatra Circuit.

== Classification ==
=== 500 cc ===
Pos.	Rider	Team	Manufacturer	Time/Retired	Points
1	(Italy) Marco Lucchinelli	Team Nava Suzuki	Suzuki	48'05.700	15
2	(United States) Randy Mamola	Ingersoll Herin Team Suzuki	Suzuki	+19.500	12
3	(South Africa) Kork Ballington	Team Kawasaki	Kawasaki	+19.800	10
4	(Netherlands) Jack Middelburg	Racing Westland	Suzuki	+20.000	8
5	(New Zealand) Graeme Crosby	Ingersoll Herin Team Suzuki	Suzuki	+33.700	6
6	(France) Marc Fontan	Team Sonauto Gauloises	Yamaha	+35.300	5
7	(United States) Kenny Roberts	Yamaha Motor Company	Yamaha	+39.000	4
8	(Finland) Seppo Rossi		Suzuki	+50.200	3
9	(France) Franck Gross		Suzuki	+1'48.100	2
10	(United Kingdom) Steve Parrish	Team Mitsui Yamaha	Yamaha	+1'55.200	1
11	(Switzerland) Michel Frutschi	Elf Motor Racing Team	Yamaha	+1'57.900	
12	(Italy) Gianni Rolando		Lombardini	+1 lap	
13	(Finland) Timo Pohjola		Suzuki	+1 lap	
14	(Denmark) Børge Nielsen		Suzuki	+1 lap	
15	(Switzerland) Philippe Coulon		Suzuki	+5 laps	
Ret	(Netherlands) Boet van Dulmen		Yamaha	Retired	
Ret	(Italy) Franco Uncini		Suzuki	Retired	
Ret	(Italy) Guido Paci		Yamaha	Retired	
Ret	(Italy) Gianni Pelletier		Suzuki	Retired	
Ret	(France) Bernard Fau		Yamaha	Retired	
Ret	(Switzerland) Sergio Pellandini		Suzuki	Retired	
Ret	(United Kingdom) Barry Sheene		Yamaha	Retired	
Ret	(Italy) Graziano Rossi	Morbidelli	Morbidelli	Retired	
Ret	(France) Christian Sarron	Team Sonauto Gauloises	Yamaha	Retired	
Ret	(Japan) Sadao Asami		Yamaha	Retired	
Ret	(Sweden) Peter Sjöström		Suzuki	Retired	
Ret	(Italy) Carlo Perugini	Moto Sanvenero	Sanvenero	Retired	
Ret	(Japan) Ikujiro Takai		Yamaha	Retired	
Ret	(Finland) Kimmo Kopra		Suzuki	Retired	
Ret	(Finland) Seppo Korhonen		Suzuki	Retired	

Previous race: 1981 British Grand Prix	FIM Grand Prix World Championship; 1981 season	Next race: 1981 Swedish Grand Prix
Previous race: 1980 Finnish Grand Prix	Finnish Grand Prix	Next race: 1982 Finnish Grand Prix
