= Marco Greco =

Brazilian former racing driver

- Nationality: Brazil
- Born: Marco Antonio Greco; December 1, 1963 (age 62) São Paulo, Brazil

Indy Racing League IndyCar Series
- Years active: 1996–1999
- Teams: A. J. Foyt Enterprises; Team Scandia; Galles Racing; Phoenix Racing
- Starts: 23
- Wins: 0
- Poles: 1
- Best finish: 3rd in 1996–1997

Marco Greco

CART IndyCar World Series
- Years active: 1993–1996
- Teams: Sovereign Motorsports; Arciero Racing; Dick Simon Racing; Team Scandia; Galles Racing
- Starts: 40
- Wins: 0
- Poles: 0
- Best finish: 29th in 1995

Previous series
- 1992 1989–1991 1988–1990 1987 1981–1986 1979: Indy Lights; British Formula 3000; FIA Formula 3000; British Formula Three; 500cc road racing 350cc road racing

Marco Antonio Greco (born December 1, 1963 in São Paulo) is a Brazilian former Grand Prix motorcycle road racer and auto racing driver who competed in the Indy Racing League from 1996 to 1999. His best finish in the season points was third in 1996–1997. He made four starts in the Indianapolis 500 with a best finish of fourteenth in 1998. He previously competed in the CART World Series in full seasons in 1993 for Sovereign Motorsports and in 1994 for Arciero Racing and partial seasons in 1995 and 1996 for Dick Simon Racing, Galles Racing, and Team Scandia.

== Career results ==
=== Career summary ===
Year	Series	Position
1987	British Formula Three	NC
1988	International Formula 3000	NC
1989	British Formula Three	4th
1989	International Formula 3000	NC
1990	International Formula 3000	NC
1992	Indy Lights	7th
1993	Indianapolis 500	NC
1993	IndyCar	30th
1994	Indy Car	29th
1994	Indianapolis 500	27th
1995	IndyCar	29th
1995	Indianapolis 500	NC
1996	Indy Car	31st
1996	1996 Indianapolis 500	26th
1996	Indy Racing League	36th
1996-1997	Indy Racing League	**3rd**
1997	1997 Indianapolis 500	16th
1998	Indy Racing League	10th
1998	1998 Indianapolis 500	14th
1999	Indy Racing League	36th

=== Grand Prix motorcycle racing ===
==== Races by year ====
(key) (Races in bold indicate pole position, races in italics indicate fastest lap)

Year	Class	Bike	1	2	3	4	5	6	7	8	9	10	11	12	Pos	Pts
1979	350 cc	Yamaha	VEN; 16	AUT	GER	ITA	SPA	YUG	NED	FIN	GBR	CZE	FRA		–	0
1981	500 cc	Suzuki	AUT	GER; 29	ITA	FRA; 24	YUG; 18	NED	BEL	SMR	GBR	FIN	SWE		–	0
1982	500 cc	Suzuki	ARG; 20	AUT	FRA; 17	SPA; 19	ITA	NED	BEL	YUG	GBR; DNQ	SWE	SMR	GER	–	0
1983	500 cc	Suzuki	RSA; 16	FRA; Ret	ITA; 18	GER; 31	SPA; Ret	AUT	YUG; Ret	NED	BEL	GBR	SWE	SMR	–	0
1985	500 cc	Honda	RSA; Ret	SPA; DNQ	GER	ITA	AUT	YUG	NED	BEL	FRA	GBR	SWE	SMR	–	0
1986	500 cc	Honda	SPA	ITA	GER	AUT	YUG	NED	BEL	FRA	GBR	SWE	SMR; 24		–	0

=== Complete International Formula 3000 results ===
(key) (Races in bold indicate pole position) (Races in italics indicate fastest lap)

Year	Entrant	1	2	3	4	5	6	7	8	9	10	11	DC	Points
1988	Team Ralt	JER	VAL	PAU	SIL; DNQ	MNZ; DNQ	PER; DNQ	BRH; DNQ	BIR; DNQ				NC	0
1988	Spirit/TOM's Racing									BUG; DNQ	ZOL; DNQ	DIJ; DNQ	NC	0
1989	Bromley Motorsport	SIL	VAL	PAU	JER	PER	BRH; Ret	BIR	SPA				NC	0
1989	GA Motorsports									BUG; Ret	DIJ; Ret		NC	0
1990	Pacific Racing	DON; DNQ	SIL; DNQ	PAU	JER	MNZ							NC	0
1990	GA Motorsports						PER; Ret	HOC; DNQ	BRH; DNQ	BIR			NC	0
1990	First Racing										BUG; DNQ	NOG; DNQ	NC	0

=== American Open Wheel ===
(key)

==== CART ====
Year	Team	1	2	3	4	5	6	7	8	9	10	11	12	13	14	15	16	17	Rank	Points
1993	Arciero Racing	SRF; 22	PHX; 11	LBH; 25	INDY; DNQ	MIL; DNQ	DET; 19	POR; 19	CLE; 22	TOR; 21	MIC; 18	NHA; 17	ROA; 28	VAN; 20	MDO; 18	NZR; 23	LS; DNQ		**30th**	**2**
1994	Arciero Racing	SRF; DNQ	PHX; 16	LBH; 23	INDY; 27	MIL; 20	DET; 24	POR; 20	CLE; 26	TOR; 15	MIC; 11	MDO; DNQ	NHA; 16	VAN; 16	ROA; 21	NZR; 17	LS; 24		**29th**	**2**
1995	Galles Racing	MIA	SRF	PHX	LBH; 13	NZR; 21	INDY; DNQ	MIL	DET; 13			TOR; 20	CLE; 15	MIC	MDO; 22	NHA; 20	VAN; 25	LS; 23	**29th**	**2**
1995	Dick Simon Racing									POR; 11	ROA; 23								**29th**	**2**
1996	Dick Simon Racing	MIA; 25	RIO; 12	SRF	LBH	NZR	500	MIL	DET	POR	CLE	TOR	MIC	MDO	ROA	VAN	LS		**32nd**	**1**

==== IndyCar ====
Year	Team	1	2	3	4	5	6	7	8	9	10	11	Rank	Points
1996	A. J. Foyt Enterprises	WDW	PHX	INDY; 26									36th	9
1996–97	Arizona Motorsports w/ Team Scandia	NHM; 7	LVS; 9										3rd	230
1996–97	Team Scandia			WDW; 8	PHX; 4	INDY; 16	TXS; 26						3rd	230
1996–97	Galles Racing							PPI; 13	CLT; 9	**NH2**; 20	LV2; 10		3rd	230
1998	Phoenix Racing	WDW; 27	PHX; 20	INDY; 14	TXS; 8	NHM; 13	DOV; 3	CLT; 5	PPIR; 6	ATL; 13	TX2; 16	LVS; 8	10th	219
1999	Phoenix Racing	WDW	PHX; 12	CLT									36th	18
1999	A. J. Foyt Enterprises				INDY; DNQ	TXS	PPI	ATL	DOV	PP2	LVS	TX2	36th	18

==== Indy 500 results ====
Year	Chassis	Engine	Start	Finish	Team
1993	Lola	Chevrolet	Failed to Qualify		Sovereign
1994	Lola	Ford-Cosworth	32nd	27th	Arciero
1995	Lola	Ilmor-Mercedes	Failed to Qualify		Galles
1996	Lola	Ford-Cosworth	22nd	26th	Foyt
1997	Dallara	Oldsmobile	27th	16th	Scandia
1998	G-Force	Oldsmobile	14th	14th	Phoenix
1999	Dallara	Oldsmobile	Failed to Qualify		Foyt

== Sources ==
- Marco Greco career summary at DriverDB.com
