= Tadahiko Taira =

Japanese motorcycle racer

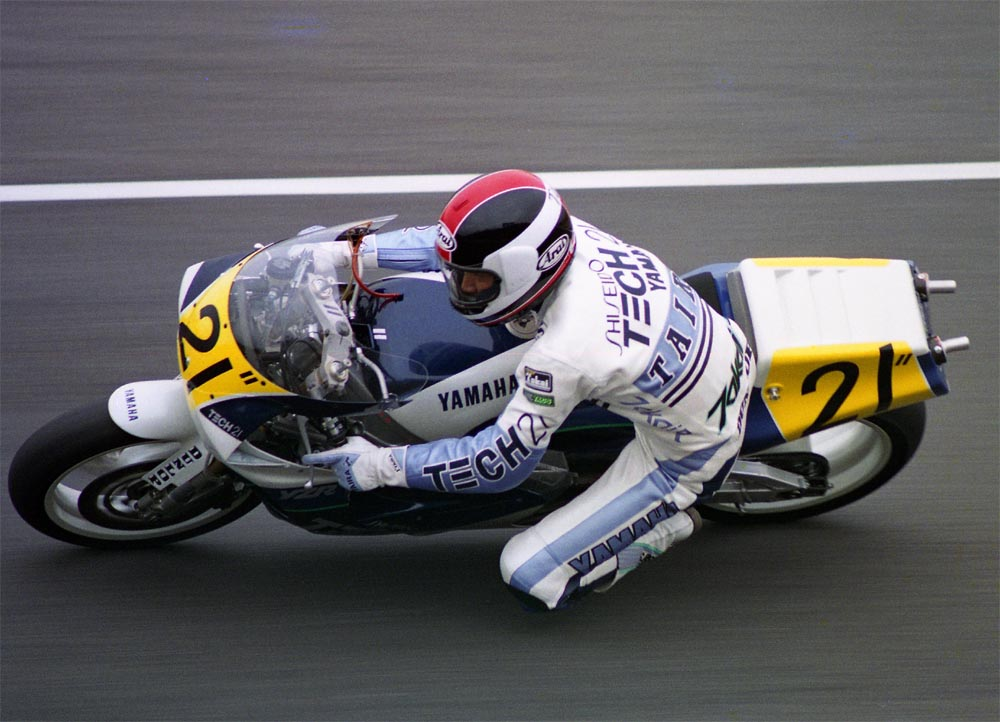
- Tadahiko Taira on the Yamaha YZR500
- Nationality: Japanese
- Born: November 12, 1956 (age 70); Minamisōma, Japan
Motorcycle racing career statistics
Grand Prix motorcycle racing
Active years	1984 - 1991
First race	1984 500cc Dutch TT
Last race	1991 500cc Japanese Grand Prix
First win	1986 250cc San Marino Grand Prix
Last win	1986 250cc San Marino Grand Prix
Team	Yamaha
Starts / Wins / Podiums / Poles / F. laps / Points; 42 / 1 / 2 / 2 / 1 / 181

Tadahiko Taira (born November 12, 1956) is a Japanese former Grand Prix motorcycle road racer.

Born in Minamisōma, Taira won three consecutive All Japan 500cc championships in 1983, 1984 and 1985. Taira began his Grand Prix career in 1984 with Yamaha. He enjoyed his best season in 1987 when he finished the season in sixth place overall in the 500cc world championship. His only Grand Prix victory came in 1986 at the 250cc San Marino Grand Prix. In 1990, he teamed with Eddie Lawson to win the Suzuka 8 Hours endurance race.

== Grand Prix career statistics ==
Points system from 1969 to 1987:

**Position**	1	2	3	4	5	6	7	8	9	10
**Points**	15	12	10	8	6	5	4	3	2	1

Points system from 1988 to 1992:

**Position**	1	2	3	4	5	6	7	8	9	10	11	12	13	14	15
**Points**	20	17	15	13	11	10	9	8	7	6	5	4	3	2	1

(key) (Races in bold indicate pole position; races in italics indicate fastest lap)

Year	Class	Team	Machine	1	2	3	4	5	6	7	8	9	10	11	12	13	14	15	Points	Rank	Wins
1984	500cc	Marlboro Yamaha	YZR500	RSA -	NAT -	ESP -	AUT -	GER -	FRA -	YUG -	NED; 6	BEL; 6	GBR -	SWE -	RSM -				10	16th	0
1985	500cc	Marlboro Yamaha	YZR500	RSA -	ESP -	GER -	NAT; 15	AUT; 9	YUG -	NED -	BEL -	FRA -	GBR -	SWE -	RSM -				2	21st	0
1986	250cc	Marlboro Yamaha	YZR250	ESP -	NAT; 22	GER; 9	AUT; 8	YUG; NC	NED; 6	BEL; 9	FRA; 10	GBR; NC	SWE; 13	RSM; 1					28	9th	1
1987	500cc	Marlboro Yamaha	YZR500	JPN; 6	ESP; 7	GER; 4	NAT; 6	AUT; 9	YUG; 7	NED; 18	FRA -	GBR; 8	SWE; 13	CZE; 3	RSM; 4	POR; NC	BRA; 7	ARG; 8	56	6th	0
1988	500cc	Yamaha Racing Team	YZR500	**JPN**; 5	USA -	ESP -	EXP -	NAT; 10	GER -	AUT -	NED -	BEL -	YUG -	FRA -	GBR; 10	SWE; 14	CZE; 5	BRA -	36	15th	0
1989	500cc	Tech-21 Yamaha	YZR500	**JPN**; 8	AUS; 6	USA; NC	ESP; 8	NAT -	GER -	AUT -	YUG -	NED -	BEL -	FRA -	GBR -	SWE; 10	CZE; 9	BRA -	39	14th	0
1990	500cc	Tech-21 Yamaha	YZR500	JPN; 6	USA -	ESP -	NAT -	GER -	AUT -	YUG -	NED -	BEL -	FRA -	GBR -	SWE -	CZE -	HUN -	AUS; NC	10	23rd	0
1991	500cc	Y.R.T.R. Yamaha	YZR500	JPN; NC	AUS -	USA -	ESP -	ITA -	GER -	AUT -	EUR -	NED -	FRA -	GBR -	RSM -	CZE -	VDM -	MAL -	0	-	0

=== Suzuka 8 Hours results ===
Year	Team	Co-Rider	Bike	Pos
1990	(Japan) Shiseido Tech 21 Racing Team	(Japan) Tadahiko Taira (United States) Eddie Lawson	Yamaha YZF750	1st
