= 1985 Austrian motorcycle Grand Prix =

(Austria) 1985 Austrian Grand Prix
Race details
- Race 5 of 12 races in the 1985 Grand Prix motorcycle racing season
- Date: 2 June 1985
- Official name: Großer Preis von Österreich
- Location: Salzburgring
- Course: Permanent racing facility; 4.246 km (2.638 mi)

500cc
Pole position
- Rider: (United States) Freddie Spencer
- Time: 1:18.130
Fastest lap
- Rider: (France) Christian Sarron
- Time: 1:17.420
Podium
- First: (United States) Freddie Spencer
- Second: (United States) Eddie Lawson
- Third: (France) Christian Sarron

250cc
Pole position
- Rider: (United States) Freddie Spencer
- Time: 1:22.750
Fastest lap
- Rider: (United States) Freddie Spencer
- Time: 1:23.270
Podium
- First: (United States) Freddie Spencer
- Second: (West Germany) Anton Mang
- Third: (Italy) Fausto Ricci

125cc
Pole position
- Rider: (Italy) Ezio Gianola
- Time: 1:29.120
Fastest lap
- Rider: (Italy) Fausto Gresini
- Time: 1:28.130
Podium
- First: (Italy) Fausto Gresini
- Second: (Austria) August Auinger
- Third: (Italy) Ezio Gianola

80cc
Pole position
- Rider: No 80cc was held
Fastest lap
- Rider: No 80cc was held
Podium
- First: No 80cc was held
- Second: No 80cc was held
- Third: No 80cc was held

The 1985 Austrian motorcycle Grand Prix was the fifth round of the 1985 Grand Prix motorcycle racing season. It took place on the weekend of 1–2 June 1985 at the Salzburgring.

== Classification ==
=== 500 cc ===
Pos.	Rider	Team	Manufacturer	Time/Retired	Points
1	(United States) Freddie Spencer	Rothmans Team HRC	Honda	40'40.480	15
2	(United States) Eddie Lawson	Marlboro Team Agostini	Yamaha	+0.030	12
3	(France) Christian Sarron	Sonauto Gauloises Yamaha	Yamaha	+34.360	10
4	(United States) Randy Mamola	Rothmans Honda Mamola	Honda	+46.530	8
5	(United Kingdom) Rob McElnea	Skoal Bandit Heron Suzuki	Suzuki	+1'21.840	6
6	(Belgium) Didier de Radiguès	Honda Benelux Elf	Honda	+1'25.280	5
7	(United States) Mike Baldwin		Honda	+1'40.660	4
8	(Netherlands) Boet van Dulmen	Shell-Toshiba Racing Team	Honda	+1'40.750	3
9	(Japan) Tadahiko Taira		Yamaha	+1'41.860	2
10	(France) Raymond Roche	Marlboro Team Agostini	Yamaha	+1'53.940	1
11	(Finland) Eero Hyvärinen		Honda	+1'54.600	
12	(West Germany) Gustav Reiner	Zwafink & Wilberts Racing	Honda	+1'55.280	
13	(Italy) Franco Uncini	HB Suzuki GP Team	Suzuki	+2'10.940	
14	(Japan) Takazumi Katayama	Rothmans Honda Team	Honda	+1 lap	
15	(Australia) Wayne Gardner	Rothmans Honda Britain	Honda	+1 lap	
16	(United Kingdom) Ron Haslam	Rothmans Honda Britain	Honda	+1 lap	
17	(Switzerland) Wolfgang Von Muralt	Frankonia-Suzuki	Suzuki	+1 lap	
18	(Austria) Karl Truchsess		Honda	+1 lap	
19	(France) Christian Le Liard	Team ROC	Honda	+1 lap	
20	(Zimbabwe) Dave Petersen	Kreepy Krauly Racing	Honda	+1 lap	
21	(West Germany) Manfred Fischer		Honda	+1 lap	
22	(United Kingdom) Paul Iddon		Suzuki	+2 laps	
23	(United Kingdom) Keith Huewen		Honda	+2 laps	
24	(Netherlands) Rob Punt	Oud Bier	Suzuki	+2 laps	
25	(Switzerland) Marco Gentile		Yamaha	+2 laps	
26	(Austria) Josef Doppler		Honda	+2 laps	
27	(United Kingdom) Simon Buckmaster	Sid Griffiths Racing	Suzuki	+2 laps	
28	(United Kingdom) Gary Lingham		Suzuki	+3 laps	
Ret	(Netherlands) Henk van der Mark	Stichting Netherlands Racing Team	Honda	Accident	
Ret	(West Germany) Georg Jung		Suzuki	Retired	
Ret	(Italy) Fabio Biliotti	Team Italia	Honda	Retired	
Ret	(Spain) Sito Pons	HB Suzuki GP Team	Suzuki	Retired	
Ret	(Austria) Josef Ragginger		Suzuki	Retired	
Ret	(Italy) Massimo Broccoli		Paton	Retired	
Ret	(France) Thierry Espié		Chevallier	Accident	

Previous race: 1985 Nations Grand Prix	FIM Grand Prix World Championship; 1985 season	Next race: 1985 Yugoslavian Grand Prix
Previous race: 1984 Austrian Grand Prix	Austrian Grand Prix	Next race: 1986 Austrian Grand Prix
