= 1985 Nations motorcycle Grand Prix =

(Italy) 1985 Nations Grand Prix
Race details
- Race 4 of 12 races in the 1985 Grand Prix motorcycle racing season
- Date: 26 May 1985
- Official name: Gran Premio delle Nazioni
- Location: Autodromo Internazionale del Mugello
- Course: Permanent racing facility; 5.245 km (3.259 mi)

500cc
Pole position
- Rider: (United States) Freddie Spencer
- Time: 2:01.490
Fastest lap
- Rider: (United States) Freddie Spencer
- Time: 2:02.220
Podium
- First: (United States) Freddie Spencer
- Second: (United States) Eddie Lawson
- Third: (Australia) Wayne Gardner

250cc
Pole position
- Rider: (West Germany) Martin Wimmer
- Time: 2:04.600
Fastest lap
- Rider: (United States) Freddie Spencer
- Time: 2:05.570
Podium
- First: (United States) Freddie Spencer
- Second: (Venezuela) Carlos Lavado
- Third: (Italy) Fausto Ricci

125cc
Pole position
- Rider: (Austria) August Auinger
- Time: 2:09.860
Fastest lap
- Rider: (Italy) Luca Cadalora
- Time: 2:10.700
Podium
- First: (Italy) Pier Paolo Bianchi
- Second: (Italy) Ezio Gianola
- Third: (Belgium) Lucio Pietroniro

80cc
Pole position
- Rider: (Switzerland) Stefan Dörflinger
- Time: 2:14.980
Fastest lap
- Rider: (Spain) Jorge Martínez
Podium
- First: (Spain) Jorge Martínez
- Second: (Spain) Manuel Herreros
- Third: (Switzerland) Stefan Dörflinger

The 1985 Nations motorcycle Grand Prix was the fourth race of the 1985 Grand Prix motorcycle racing season. It took place on the weekend of 24–26 May 1985 at the Mugello Circuit.

== Classification ==
=== 500 cc ===
Pos.	Rider	Team	Manufacturer	Time/retired	Points
1	(United States) Freddie Spencer	Rothmans Team HRC	Honda	55'42.720	15
2	(United States) Eddie Lawson	Marlboro Team Agostini	Yamaha	+9.250	12
3	(Australia) Wayne Gardner	Rothmans Honda Britain	Honda	+47.940	10
4	(United States) Randy Mamola	Rothmans Honda Mamola	Honda	+54.340	8
5	(France) Christian Sarron	Sonauto Gauloises Yamaha	Yamaha	+1'01.450	6
6	(United Kingdom) Ron Haslam	Rothmans Honda Britain	Honda	+1'13.420	5
7	(France) Raymond Roche	Marlboro Team Agostini	Yamaha	+1'17.990	4
8	(Italy) Franco Uncini	HB Suzuki GP Team	Suzuki	+1'20.820	3
9	(United Kingdom) Rob McElnea	Skoal Bandit Heron Suzuki	Suzuki	+1'50.660	2
10	(Belgium) Didier de Radiguès	Honda Benelux Elf	Honda	+2'12.640	1
11	(United States) Mike Baldwin		Honda	+1 lap	
12	(Italy) Fabio Biliotti	Team Italia	Honda	+1 lap	
13	(Netherlands) Boet van Dulmen	Shell-Toshiba Racing Team	Honda	+1 lap	
14	(Zimbabwe) Dave Petersen	Kreepy Krauly Racing	Honda	+1 lap	
15	(Japan) Tadahiko Taira		Yamaha	+1 lap	
16	(France) Christian Le Liard		Team ROC	+1 lap	
17	(Switzerland) Wolfgang Von Muralt	Frankonia-Suzuki	Suzuki	+1 lap	
18	(Netherlands) Henk van der Mark	Stichting Netherlands Racing Team	Honda	+1 lap	
19	(Italy) Leandro Beccheroni		Suzuki	+1 lap	
20	(Italy) Marco Papa		Suzuki	+1 lap	
21	(Austria) Karl Truchsess		Honda	+1 lap	
22	(United Kingdom) Gary Lingham		Suzuki	+3 laps	
23	(Luxembourg) Andreas Leuthe		Honda	+3 laps	
Ret	(Italy) Paolo Ferreti		Honda	Retired	
Ret	(Finland) Eero Hyvärinen		Honda	Retired	
Ret	(Italy) Paolo Cipriani		Suzuki	Retired	
Ret	(Spain) Sito Pons	HB Suzuki GP Team	Suzuki	Retired	
Ret	(United Kingdom) Keith Huewen		Honda	Retired	
Ret	(Italy) Massimo Broccoli		Paton	Retired	
Ret	(Italy) Roberto Balbi		Suzuki	Retired	
Ret	(United Kingdom) Neil Robinson	Jim Finlay Racing	Suzuki	Retired	
DNS	(Italy) Armando Errico	Team Italia	Honda	Did not start	
DNS	(Japan) Takazumi Katayama	Rothmans Honda Team	Honda	Did not start	
DNS	(France) Thierry Espié		Chevallier	Did not start	

Previous race: 1985 German Grand Prix	FIM Grand Prix World Championship; 1985 season	Next race: 1985 Austrian Grand Prix
Previous race: 1984 Nations Grand Prix	Italian Grand Prix	Next race: 1986 Nations Grand Prix
