= 1985 Swedish motorcycle Grand Prix =

(Sweden) 1985 Swedish Grand Prix
Race details
- Race 11 of 12 races in the 1985 Grand Prix motorcycle racing season
- Date: 11 August 1985
- Official name: Swedish TT
- Location: Scandinavian Raceway
- Course: Permanent racing facility; 4.031 km (2.505 mi)

500cc
Pole position
- Rider: (United States) Freddie Spencer
- Time: 1:36.460
Fastest lap
- Rider: Unknown
Podium
- First: (United States) Freddie Spencer
- Second: (United States) Eddie Lawson
- Third: (United Kingdom) Ron Haslam

250cc
Pole position
- Rider: (Venezuela) Carlos Lavado
- Time: 1:41.260
Fastest lap
- Rider: Unknown
Podium
- First: (West Germany) Anton Mang
- Second: (Venezuela) Carlos Lavado
- Third: (Italy) Fausto Ricci

125cc
Pole position
- Rider: (Italy) Fausto Gresini
- Time: 1:44.190
Fastest lap
- Rider: Unknown
Podium
- First: (Austria) August Auinger
- Second: (Italy) Pier Paolo Bianchi
- Third: (Italy) Fausto Gresini

80cc
Pole position
- Rider: No 80cc was held
Fastest lap
- Rider: No 80cc was held
Podium
- First: No 80cc was held
- Second: No 80cc was held
- Third: No 80cc was held

The 1985 Swedish motorcycle Grand Prix was the eleventh round of the 1985 Grand Prix motorcycle racing season. It took place on the weekend of 9–11 August at the Scandinavian Raceway.

This was the last victory for the American Freddie Spencer.

== Classification ==
=== 500 cc ===
Pos.	Rider	Team	Manufacturer	Time/Retired	Points
1	(United States) Freddie Spencer	Rothmans Team HRC	Honda	49'26.730	15
2	(United States) Eddie Lawson	Marlboro Team Agostini	Yamaha	+22.800	12
3	(United Kingdom) Ron Haslam	Rothmans Honda Britain	Honda	+37.910	10
4	(France) Christian Sarron	Sonauto Gauloises Yamaha	Yamaha	+52.240	8
5	(United States) Randy Mamola	Rothmans Honda Mamola	Honda	+1'06.480	6
6	(Belgium) Didier de Radiguès	'Honda Benelux Elf	Honda	+1'08.540	5
7	(United States) Mike Baldwin		Honda	+1'09.370	4
8	(France) Raymond Roche	Marlboro Team Agostini	Yamaha	+1'31.700	3
9	(France) Thierry Espié		Chevallier	+1 lap	2
10	(Italy) Massimo Messere	Team Italia	Honda	+1 lap	1
11	(Finland) Eero Hyvärinen		Honda	+1 lap	
12	(Zimbabwe) Dave Petersen	Kreepy Krauly Racing	Honda	+1 lap	
13	(Sweden) Peter Linden		Honda	+1 lap	
14	(Netherlands) Boet van Dulmen	Shell-Toshiba Racing Team	Honda	+1 lap	
15	(Netherlands) Rob Punt	Oud Bier	Suzuki	+1 lap	
16	(Finland) Esko Kuparinen		Suzuki	+1 lap	
17	(United Kingdom) Simon Buckmaster	Sid Griffiths Racing	Suzuki	+2 laps	
18	(Netherlands) Maarten Duyzers		Suzuki	+2 laps	
19	(Norway) Geir Hestman	Team Italia	Honda	+2 laps	
20	(United Kingdom) David Griffith		Suzuki	+2 laps	
21	(Luxembourg) Andreas Leuthe		Honda	+3 laps	
22	(Italy) Fabio Biliotti	Team Italia	Honda	+4 laps	
23	(France) Christian Le Liard	Team ROC	Honda	+11 laps	
24	(Sweden) Lars Johansson		Suzuki	+13 laps	
Ret	(Australia) Wayne Gardner	Rothmans Honda Britain	Honda	Retired	
Ret	(United Kingdom) Rob McElnea	Skoal Bandit Heron Suzuki	Suzuki	Accident	
Ret	(Italy) Franco Uncini	HB Suzuki GP Team	Suzuki	Accident	
Ret	(Denmark) Kjeld Sorensen		Suzuki	Retired	
Ret	(Sweden) Michael Jansberg		Suzuki	Retired	
Ret	(Italy) Armando Errico	Team Italia	Honda	Retired	
Ret	(Switzerland) Wolfgang Von Muralt	Frankonia-Suzuki	Suzuki	Retired	
Ret	(Sweden) Peter Sköld		Bakker-Honda	Retired	
Ret	(West Germany) Gustav Reiner	Zwafink & Wilberts Racing	Honda	Accident	
Ret	(Spain) Sito Pons	HB Suzuki GP Team	Suzuki	Retired	
DNS	(Denmark) Claus Wulff		Suzuki	Did not start	
DNS	(United Kingdom) Neil Robinson	Jim Finlay Racing	Suzuki	Did not start	
DNS	(Sweden) Gunnar Bruhn		Suzuki	Did not start	
DNQ	(West Germany) Helmut Schütz		Suzuki	Did not qualify	
DNQ	(Austria) Erich Sanders		Suzuki	Did not qualify	

Previous race: 1985 British Grand Prix	FIM Grand Prix World Championship; 1985 season	Next race: 1985 San Marino Grand Prix
Previous race: 1984 Swedish Grand Prix	Swedish Grand Prix	Next race: 1986 Swedish Grand Prix
