= 1985 British motorcycle Grand Prix =

Motorsports competition

(United Kingdom) 1985 British Grand Prix
Race details
- Race 10 of 12 races in the 1985 Grand Prix motorcycle racing season
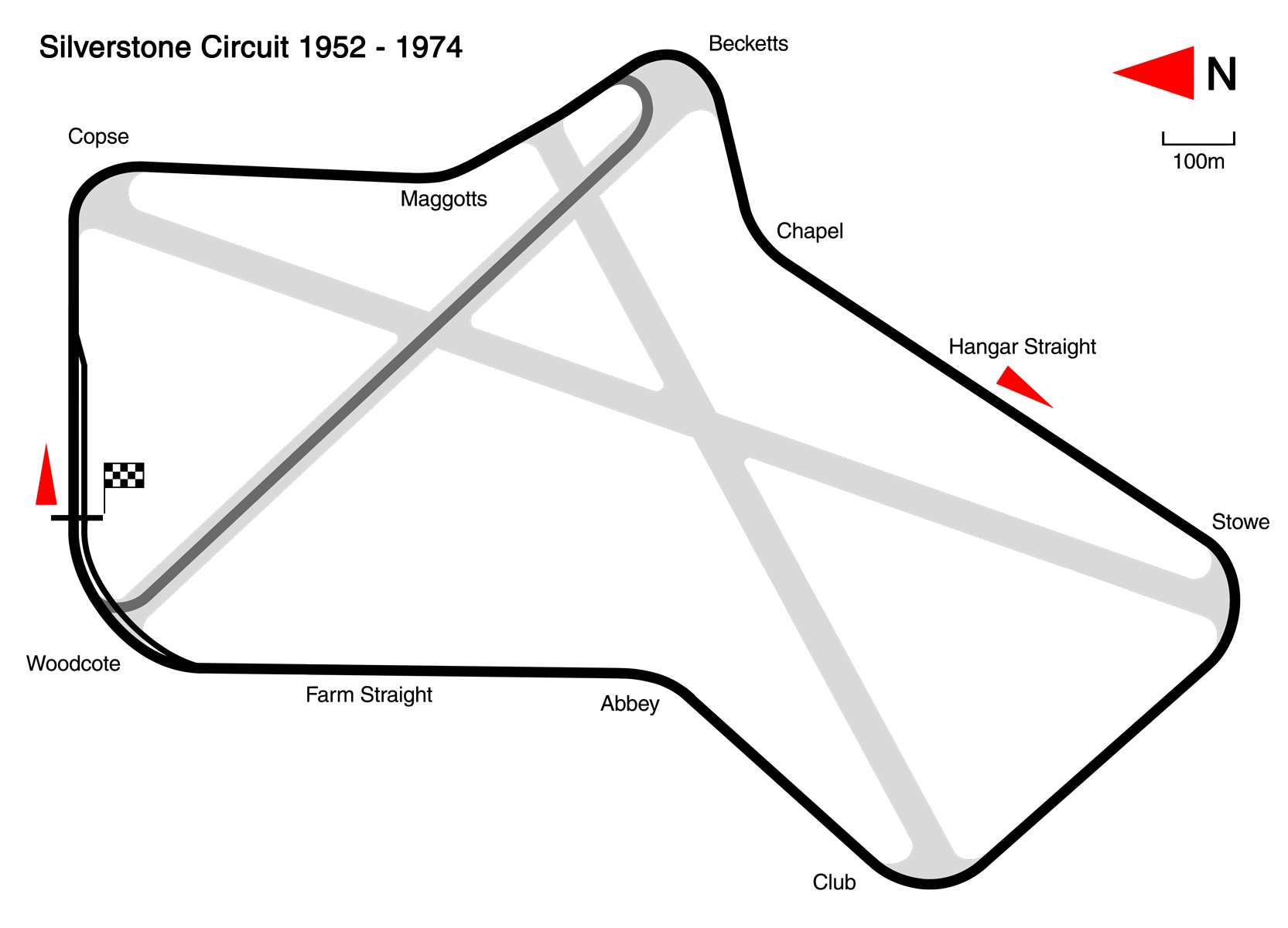
- Date: 4 August 1985
- Official name: Marlboro British Grand Prix
- Location: Silverstone Circuit
- Course: Permanent racing facility; 4.711 km (2.927 mi)

500cc
Pole position
- Rider: (United States) Freddie Spencer
- Time: 1:28.420
Fastest lap
- Rider: (United States) Freddie Spencer
- Time: 1:43.530
Podium
- First: (United States) Freddie Spencer
- Second: (United States) Eddie Lawson
- Third: (France) Christian Sarron

250cc
Pole position
- Rider: (Venezuela) Carlos Lavado
- Time: 1:32.780
Fastest lap
- Rider: (West Germany) Manfred Herweh
- Time: 1:46.780
Podium
- First: (West Germany) Anton Mang
- Second: (West Germany) Reinhold Roth
- Third: (West Germany) Manfred Herweh

125cc
Pole position
- Rider: (Italy) Ezio Gianola
- Time: 1:39.600
Fastest lap
- Rider: (Austria) August Auinger
- Time: 1:53.950
Podium
- First: (Austria) August Auinger
- Second: (Italy) Pier Paolo Bianchi
- Third: (France) Jean-Claude Selini

80cc
Pole position
- Rider: No 80cc was held
Fastest lap
- Rider: No 80cc was held
Podium
- First: No 80cc was held
- Second: No 80cc was held
- Third: No 80cc was held

The 1985 British motorcycle Grand Prix was the tenth round of the 1985 Grand Prix motorcycle racing season. It took place on the weekend of 2–4 August 1985 at the Silverstone Circuit.

== Classification ==
=== 500 cc ===
Pos.	Rider	Team	Manufacturer	Time/Retired	Points
1	(United States) Freddie Spencer	Rothmans Team HRC	Honda	49'20.170	15
2	(United States) Eddie Lawson	Marlboro Team Agostini	Yamaha	+8.320	12
3	(France) Christian Sarron	Sonauto Gauloises Yamaha	Yamaha	+32.480	10
4	(Belgium) Didier de Radiguès	Honda Benelux Elf	Honda	+1'07.210	8
5	(United States) Randy Mamola	Rothmans Honda Mamola	Honda	+1'16.110	6
6	(France) Raymond Roche	Marlboro Team Agostini	Yamaha	+1'18.720	5
7	(Netherlands) Boet van Dulmen	Shell-Toshiba Racing Team	Honda	+1 lap	4
8	(United Kingdom) Roger Burnett	Rothmans Honda Britain	Honda	+1 lap	3
9	(United Kingdom) Neil Robinson	Jim Finlay Racing	Suzuki	+1 lap	2
10	(Australia) Paul Lewis	Skoal Bandit Heron Suzuki	Suzuki	+1 lap	1
11	(Zimbabwe) Dave Petersen	Kreepy Krauly Racing	Honda	+1 lap	
12	(United Kingdom) Chris Martin		Suzuki	+1 lap	
13	(Netherlands) Rob Punt	Oud Bier	Suzuki	+1 lap	
14	(United Kingdom) Ron Haslam	Rothmans Honda Britain	Honda	+1 lap	
15	(Switzerland) Wolfgang Von Muralt	Frankonia-Suzuki	Suzuki	+1 lap	
16	(France) Christian Le Liard	Team ROC	Honda	+1 lap	
17	(United Kingdom) Steve Parrish		Yamaha	+1 lap	
18	(Italy) Franco Uncini	HB Suzuki GP Team	Suzuki	+1 lap	
19	(Italy) Fabio Biliotti	Team Italia	Honda	+1 lap	
20	(United Kingdom) Ray Swann		Suzuki	+2 laps	
21	(United Kingdom) Paul Iddon		Suzuki	+2 laps	
22	(United Kingdom) Trevor Nation		Suzuki	+2 laps	
23	(Netherlands) Maarten Duyzers	Suzuki	+2 laps		
24	(Italy) Massimo Messere	Team Italia	Honda	+2 laps	
25	(United Kingdom) Barry Woodland		Suzuki	+3 laps	
26	(United Kingdom) Simon Buckmaster	Sid Griffiths Racing	Suzuki	+3 laps	
27	(Austria) Karl Truchsess		Honda	+3 laps	
28	(United Kingdom) Mark Ordridge		Suzuki	+5 laps	
Ret	(France) Thierry Espié		Chevallier	Retired	
Ret	(United Kingdom) Mark Salle		Suzuki	Retired	
Ret	(Italy) Armando Errico	Team Italia	Honda	Retired	
Ret	(Spain) Sito Pons	HB Suzuki GP Team	Suzuki	Retired	
Ret	(West Germany) Gustav Reiner	Zwafink & Wilberts Racing	Honda	Accident	
Ret	(United Kingdom) Gary Lingham		Suzuki	Retired	
Ret	(United Kingdom) Keith Huewen		Honda	Retired	
Ret	(United Kingdom) Alan Jeffrey		Suzuki	Retired	
Ret	(United Kingdom) Rob McElnea	Skoal Bandit Heron Suzuki	Suzuki	Retired	
Ret	(Australia) Wayne Gardner	Rothmans Honda Britain	Honda	Retired	
Ret	(Finland) Eero Hyvärinen		Honda	Retired	
Ret	(United Kingdom) Roger Marshall	Rothmans Honda Britain	Honda	Retired	
DNQ	(United Kingdom) Toni Moran		Suzuki	Did not qualify	
DNQ	(Italy) Marco Papa		Suzuki	Did not qualify	
DNQ	(United Kingdom) Des Barry		Yamaha	Did not qualify	
DNQ	(Spain) Carlos Morante		Suzuki	Did not qualify	
DNQ	(United Kingdom) David Griffith		Suzuki	Did not qualify	
DNQ	(Netherlands) Peter Lemstra		Suzuki	Did not qualify	

Previous race: 1985 French Grand Prix	FIM Grand Prix World Championship; 1985 season	Next race: 1985 Swedish Grand Prix
Previous race: 1984 British Grand Prix	British Grand Prix	Next race: 1986 British Grand Prix
