= Rob McElnea =

British motorcycle racer (born 1959)

- Nationality: British
- Born: 12 December 1959 (age 66)
Motorcycle racing career statistics
Grand Prix motorcycle racing
| Active years | 1983 – 1989 |
| First race | 1983 500cc British Grand Prix |
| Last race | 1989 500cc Brazilian Grand Prix |
| Team(s) | Yamaha, Suzuki |
| Championships | 0 |
Starts / Wins / Podiums / Poles / F. laps / Points; 71 / 0 / 0 / 0 / 0 / 275.5
Superbike World Championship
| Active years | 1989 – 1993 |
| Manufacturers | Yamaha |
| 1993 championship position | - |
Starts / Wins / Podiums / Poles / F. laps / Points; 42 / 0 / 4 / 0 / 1

Rob McElnea (born 12 December 1959) is a British former professional motorcycle road racer. At the peak of his career, he raced six seasons in MotoGP, then named 500cc Grand Prix Championship. He also competed for five years in the World Superbike Championship and became British Superbike Champion in 1991. McElnea went on to run the very successful Rob Mac Racing team in the British Superbike Championship for over a decade until 2011.

== Motorcycle racing career ==
Having won the Senior Manx Grand Prix in 1980, McElnea's TT wins followed in 1983 and 1984, and he won a round of the TT Formula 1 World Championship in 1983, finishing second to Joey Dunlop in the season final standings. He competed for six seasons in 500cc Grand Prix for Heron Suzuki, Marlboro Yamaha, Pepsi Suzuki and Cabin Honda. Despite finishing fourth eight times, luck went against him and he never quite secured a podium result. He then finished fifth overall in the Superbike World Championship in 1990, for Loctite Yamaha. Rob then moved back to domestic competition, winning the British 750cc/TT F1 Championship and the Mallory Park Race of the Year in 1991 with the same team. His career was ended by injury in 1993.

McElnea then ran the Virgin Mobile Yamaha team in the British Superbike Championship. With Cadbury's Boost sponsorship in the 1990s and rider Niall Mackenzie, the team won three successive championships, 1996 through 1998. They have been less successful in the 21st century, although Steve Plater, James Haydon and Tommy Hill have won British Superbike races for them. For 2008 they ran Karl Harris. McElnea also ran the Virgin Mobile Cup series with the prize of a berth in his Superbike Team for upcoming riders and, from 2007, a British Supersport Championship team.

At the end of the 2011 season, McElnea retired his team who were one of the longest-standing Superbike teams in the British Superbike Championship.

== Grand Prix career statistics ==
Points system from 1969 to 1987:

| **Position** | 1 | 2 | 3 | 4 | 5 | 6 | 7 | 8 | 9 | 10 |
| **Points** | 15 | 12 | 10 | 8 | 6 | 5 | 4 | 3 | 2 | 1 |

Points system from 1988 to 1992:

| **Position** | 1 | 2 | 3 | 4 | 5 | 6 | 7 | 8 | 9 | 10 | 11 | 12 | 13 | 14 | 15 |
| **Points** | 20 | 17 | 15 | 13 | 11 | 10 | 9 | 8 | 7 | 6 | 5 | 4 | 3 | 2 | 1 |

(key) (Races in bold indicate pole position; races in italics indicate fastest lap)

| Year | Class | Team | Machine | 1 | 2 | 3 | 4 | 5 | 6 | 7 | 8 | 9 | 10 | 11 | 12 | 13 | 14 | 15 | Points | Rank | Wins |
|---|---|---|---|---|---|---|---|---|---|---|---|---|---|---|---|---|---|---|---|---|---|
| 1983 | 500cc | Heron-Suzuki | RG500 | RSA - | FRA - | NAT - | GER - | ESP - | AUT - | YUG - | NED - | BEL - | GBR; NC | SWE - | RSM - | | | | 0 | - | 0 |
| 1984 | 500cc | Heron-Suzuki | RG500 | RSA - | NAT; 11 | ESP - | AUT; 5 | GER; NC | FRA; NC | YUG - | NED - | BEL - | GBR; 7 | SWE; 5 | RSM; 6 | | | | 21 | 11th | 0 |
| 1985 | 500cc | Heron-Suzuki | RG500 | RSA; NC | ESP; NC | GER; 7 | NAT; 9 | AUT; 5 | YUG; 8 | NED; 7 | BEL; NC | FRA; NC | GBR; NC | SWE; NC | RSM; 10 | | | | 20 | 9th | 0 |
| 1986 | 500cc | Marlboro Yamaha | YZR500 | ESP; 7 | NAT; NC | GER; 4 | AUT; 6 | YUG; 4 | NED; 4 | BEL; 5 | FRA; 6 | GBR; 4 | SWE; 4 | RSM; 10 | | | | | 60 | 5th | 0 |
| 1987 | 500cc | Marlboro Yamaha | YZR500 | JPN; NC | ESP; NC | GER; 5 | NAT; 4 | AUT; 5 | YUG; NC | NED; 4 | FRA; NC | GBR; NC | SWE; 4 | CZE; 8 | RSM; NC | POR; NC | BRA; NC | ARG - | 39 | 10th | 0 |
| 1988 | 500cc | Pepsi-Suzuki | RGV500 | JPN; NC | USA; 9 | ESP; 12 | EXP; 8 | NAT; 12 | GER; 11 | AUT; 9 | NED; 10 | BEL; 6 | YUG; 8 | FRA; 11 | GBR; NC | SWE; 13 | CZE; 8 | BRA; 8 | 83 | 10th | 0 |
| 1989 | 500cc | Cabin-Honda | NSR500 | JPN - | AUS - | USA - | ESP - | NAT; DNS | GER; 10 | AUT; 11 | YUG; 11 | NED; 10 | BEL; 11 | FRA; 9 | GBR; 10 | SWE; 9 | CZE; 12 | BRA; 12 | 52.5 | 11th | 0 |
