= 1985 South African motorcycle Grand Prix =

First round of the 1985 Grand Prix motorcycle racing season

(South Africa) 1985 South African Grand Prix
Race details
- Race 1 of 12 races in the 1985 Grand Prix motorcycle racing season
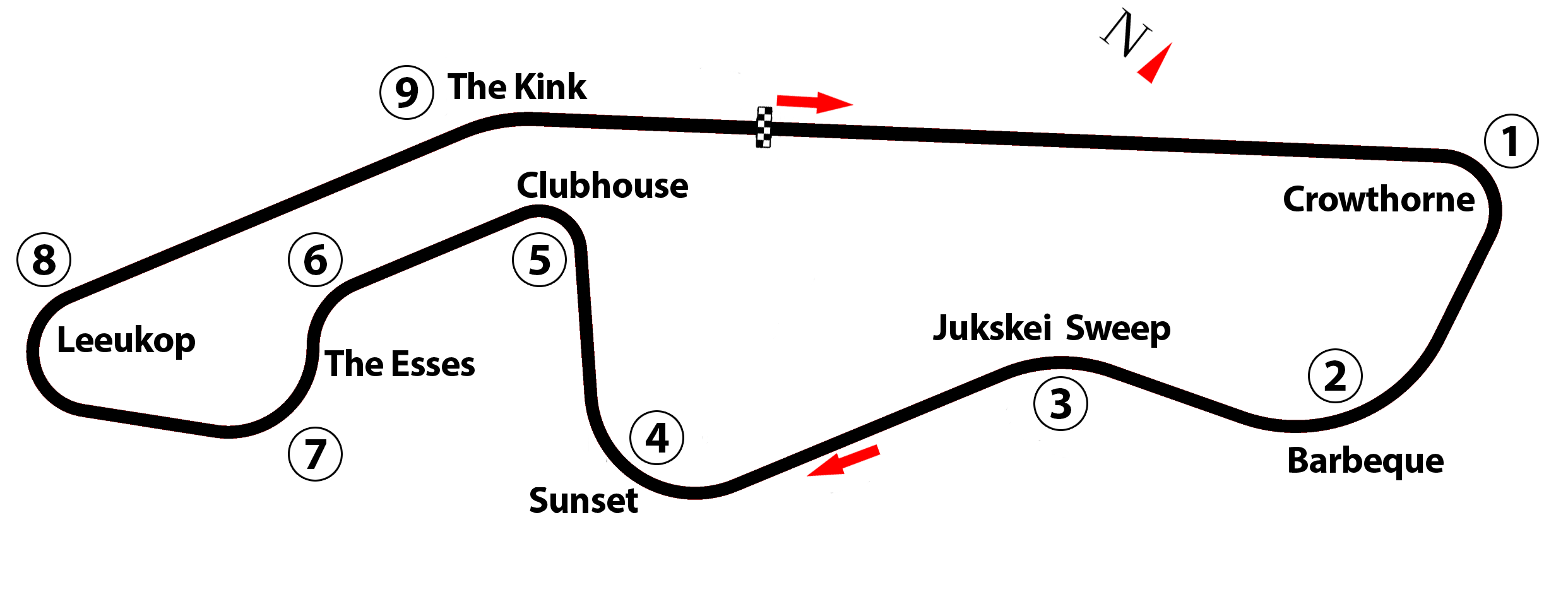
- Date: 23 March 1985
- Official name: National Panasonic Motorcycle Grand Prix
- Location: Kyalami
- Course: Permanent racing facility; 4.104 km (2.550 mi)

500cc
Pole position
- Rider: (United States) Freddie Spencer
- Time: 1:24.200
Fastest lap
- Rider: (United States) Freddie Spencer
- Time: 1:24.910
Podium
- First: (United States) Eddie Lawson
- Second: (United States) Freddie Spencer
- Third: (Australia) Wayne Gardner

250cc
Pole position
- Rider: (Venezuela) Carlos Lavado
- Time: 1:29.310
Fastest lap
- Rider: (South Africa) Mario Rademeyer
- Time: 1:28.140
Podium
- First: (United States) Freddie Spencer
- Second: (West Germany) Anton Mang
- Third: (South Africa) Mario Rademeyer

125cc
Pole position
- Rider: No 125cc was held
Fastest lap
- Rider: Unknown
Podium
- First: No 125cc was held
- Second: No 125cc was held
- Third: No 125cc was held

80cc
Pole position
- Rider: No 80cc was held
Fastest lap
- Rider: No 80cc was held
Podium
- First: No 80cc was held
- Second: No 80cc was held
- Third: No 80cc was held

The 1985 South African motorcycle Grand Prix was the first round of the 1985 Grand Prix motorcycle racing season. It took place on the weekend of 22–23 March 1985 at the Kyalami circuit. This was the last South African GP held due to the Apartheid policies which were in place in the country and the subsequent boycott from many sport associations (such as the FIM and the FIA) that followed, until the return of motorcycle racing to the new Kyalami circuit in 1992.

== Classification ==
=== 500 cc ===
Pos.	Rider	Team	Manufacturer	Time/Retired	Points
1	(United States) Eddie Lawson	Marlboro Team Agostini	Yamaha	42'58.000	15
2	(United States) Freddie Spencer	Rothmans Team HRC	Honda	+4.900	12
3	(Australia) Wayne Gardner	Rothmans Honda Britain	Honda	+22.800	10
4	(United Kingdom) Ron Haslam	Rothmans Honda Britain	Honda	+25.400	8
5	(United States) Randy Mamola	Rothmans Honda Mamola	Honda	+43.800	6
6	(France) Christian Sarron	Sonauto Gauloises Yamaha	Yamaha	+51.600	5
7	(Belgium) Didier de Radiguès	Honda Benelux Elf	Honda	+1'25.600	4
8	(Spain) Sito Pons	HB Suzuki GP Team	Suzuki	+1'25.900	3
9	(United States) Mike Baldwin		Honda	+1'26.800	2
10	(France) Thierry Espié		Chevallier	+1'27.200	1
11	(Italy) Franco Uncini	HB Suzuki GP Team	Suzuki	+1 lap	
12	(Zimbabwe) Dave Petersen	Kreepy Krauly Racing	Honda	+1 lap	
13	(Italy) Massimo Messere	Team Italia	Honda	+1 lap	
14	(West Germany) Gustav Reiner	Zwafink & Wilberts Racing	Honda	+1 lap	
15	(Switzerland) Wolfgang Von Muralt	Frankonia-Suzuki	Suzuki	+1 lap	
16	(Italy) Fabio Biliotti	Team Italia	Honda	+1 lap	
17	(Italy) Alessandro Valesi		Honda	+1 lap	
18	(Netherlands) Boet van Dulmen	Shell-Toshiba Racing Team	Honda	+1 lap	
19	(United Kingdom) Keith Huewen		Honda	+1 lap	
20	(Italy) Paolo Ferreti		Honda	+1 lap	
21	(Greece) Dimitris Papandreou		Yamaha	+4 laps	
Ret	(France) Raymond Roche	Marlboro Team Agostini	Yamaha	Retired	
Ret	(France) Christian Le Liard	Team ROC	Honda	Injury	
Ret	(Italy) Massimo Broccoli	Rollstar Honda Racing Team	Honda	Accident	
Ret	(Brazil) Marco Greco		Honda	Retired	
Ret	(United Kingdom) Rob McElnea	Skoal Bandit Heron Suzuki	Suzuki	Accident	
Ret	(West Germany) Klaus Klein		Suzuki	Retired	
DNS	(United Kingdom) Gary Lingham		Suzuki	Did not start	
DNS	(Italy) Armando Errico	Team Italia	Honda	Did not start	

Previous race: 1984 San Marino Grand Prix	FIM Grand Prix World Championship; 1985 season	Next race: 1985 Spanish Grand Prix
Previous race: 1984 South African Grand Prix	South African Grand Prix	Next race: 1992 South African Grand Prix
