= 1985 French motorcycle Grand Prix =

MotoGP race

(France) 1985 French Grand Prix
Race details
- Race 9 of 12 races in the 1985 Grand Prix motorcycle racing season
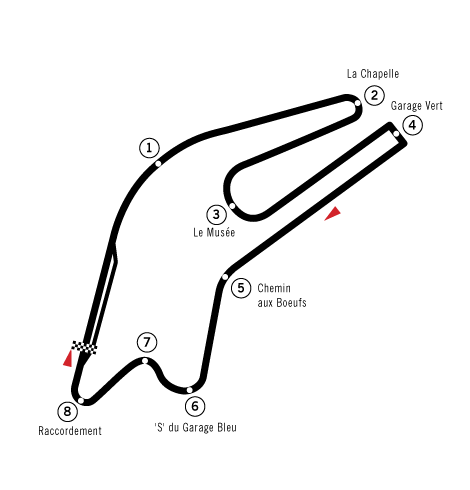
- Date: 21 July 1985
- Official name: Grand Prix de France
- Location: Bugatti Circuit
- Course: Permanent racing facility; 7.004 km (4.352 mi)

500cc
Pole position
- Rider: (United States) Freddie Spencer
- Time: 1:33.470
Fastest lap
- Rider: Unknown
Podium
- First: (United States) Freddie Spencer
- Second: (France) Raymond Roche
- Third: (United States) Randy Mamola

250cc
Pole position
- Rider: Unknown
Fastest lap
- Rider: Unknown
Podium
- First: (United States) Freddie Spencer
- Second: (West Germany) Anton Mang
- Third: (Italy) Fausto Ricci

125cc
Pole position
- Rider: Unknown
Fastest lap
- Rider: Unknown
Podium
- First: (Italy) Ezio Gianola
- Second: (Italy) Fausto Gresini
- Third: (Switzerland) Bruno Kneubühler

80cc
Pole position
- Rider: Unknown
Fastest lap
- Rider: Unknown
Podium
- First: (Spain) Ángel Nieto
- Second: (Switzerland) Stefan Dörflinger
- Third: (Netherlands) Henk van Kessel

The 1985 French motorcycle Grand Prix was the eighth round of the 1985 Grand Prix motorcycle racing season. It took place on the weekend of 19–21 July 1985 at the Bugatti Circuit located in Le Mans.

== Classification ==
=== 500 cc ===
Pos.	Rider	Team	Manufacturer	Time/Retired	Points
1	(United States) Freddie Spencer	Rothmans Team HRC	Honda	45'58.330	15
2	(France) Raymond Roche	Marlboro Team Agostini	Yamaha	+15.710	12
3	(United States) Randy Mamola	Rothmans Honda Mamola	Honda	+19.800	10
4	(United States) Eddie Lawson	Marlboro Team Agostini	Yamaha	+26.890	8
5	(United Kingdom) Ron Haslam	Rothmans Honda Britain	Honda	+33.850	6
6	(France) Pierre-Etienne Samin	Honda Benelux Elf	Honda	+1'22.750	5
7	(Spain) Sito Pons	HB Suzuki GP Team	Suzuki	+1'28.060	4
8	(West Germany) Gustav Reiner	Zwafink & Wilberts Racing	Honda	+1 lap	3
9	(Italy) Fabio Biliotti	Team Italia	Honda	+1 lap	2
10	(United States) Mike Baldwin		Honda	+1 lap	1
11	(Italy) Armando Errico	Team Italia	Honda	+1 lap	
12	(Italy) Franco Uncini	HB Suzuki GP Team	Suzuki	+1 lap	
13	(Switzerland) Wolfgang Von Muralt	Frankonia-Suzuki	Suzuki	+1 lap	
14	(Netherlands) Rob Punt	Oud Bier	Suzuki	+1 lap	
15	(Austria) Dietmar Mayer		Honda	+1 lap	
16	(France) Maurice Coq		Suzuki	+1 lap	
17	(United Kingdom) Simon Buckmaster	Sid Griffiths Racing	Suzuki	+2 lap	
18	(Luxembourg) Andreas Leuthe		Honda	+2 laps	
Ret	(United Kingdom) Neil Robinson	Jim Finlay Racing	Suzuki	Retired	
Ret	(Belgium) Didier de Radiguès	Honda Benelux Elf	Honda	Retired	
Ret	(Switzerland) Marco Gentile		Yamaha	Retired	
Ret	(France) Christian Sarron	Sonauto Gauloises Yamaha	Yamaha	Accident	
Ret	(Australia) Wayne Gardner	Rothmans Honda Britain	Honda	Retired	
Ret	(United Kingdom) Rob McElnea	Skoal Bandit Heron Suzuki	Suzuki	Retired	
Ret	(France) Christian Le Liard	Team ROC	Honda	Retired	
Ret	(Greece) Stelio Marmaras		Suzuki	Retired	
Ret	(Finland) Eero Hyvärinen		Honda	Accident	
Ret	(Netherlands) Boet van Dulmen	Shell-Toshiba Racing Team	Honda	Accident	
Ret	(Zimbabwe) Dave Petersen	Kreepy Krauly Racing	Honda	Accident	
Ret	(Italy) Massimo Messere	Team Italia	Honda	Retired	
Ret	(France) Louis-Luc Maisto		Honda	Retired	
DNS	(Italy) Claude Arciero		Honda	Did not start	
DNS	(France) Thierry Espié		Chevallier	Did not start	
DNQ	(France) René Lavigne		Honda	Did not qualify	

Previous race: 1985 Belgian Grand Prix	FIM Grand Prix World Championship; 1985 season	Next race: 1985 British Grand Prix
Previous race: 1984 French Grand Prix	French motorcycle Grand Prix	Next race: 1986 French Grand Prix
