= 1985 Grand Prix motorcycle racing season =

Sports season

1985 F.I.M. Grand Prix motorcycle racing season

Seasons
- ← 1984 1986 →

The 1985 Grand Prix motorcycle racing season was the 37th F.I.M. Road Racing World Championship season.

== Season summary ==
Honda's Freddie Spencer gave a dominating performance becoming the first man to win the 250 and 500 championships in the same year. Defending champion Eddie Lawson finished in second with former 250 world champion, Christian Sarron coming in third. Sarron's victory at the German Grand Prix would mark the first 500cc Grand Prix victory for a non-American rider since the 1982 Swedish Grand Prix. Australian Wayne Gardner showed promise with a fourth-place finish for Honda.

With perennial champion Angel Nieto moving to the 80cc class, the 125 class was left open for his Garelli teammate, Fausto Gresini to clinch the title, giving the Italian team its fourth consecutive championship. Swiss Stefan Dörflinger would take his fourth consecutive title in the 80cc class. Angel Nieto won his 90th and final Grand Prix victory in the 80cc round in France, at the time second only to Giacomo Agostini, but since surpassed by Valentino Rossi.

== 1985 Grand Prix season calendar ==
The following Grands Prix were scheduled to take place in 1985:

Round	Date	Grand Prix	Circuit
1	23 March ††	(South Africa) National Panasonic Motorcycle Grand Prix	Kyalami
2	5 May	(Spain) Gran Premio de España	Circuito Permanente Del Jarama
3	19 May	(Germany) Großer Preis von Deutschland	Hockenheimring
4	26 May	(Italy) Gran Premio delle Nazioni	Mugello
5	2 June	(Austria) Großer Preis von Österreich	Salzburgring
6	16 June	(Socialist Federal Republic of Yugoslavia) Yugoslavian Grand Prix	Automotodrom Rijeka
7	29 June ††	(Netherlands) Dutch TT Assen	TT Circuit Assen
8	7 July	Johnson GP of Belgium	Circuit de Spa-Francorchamps
9	21 July	Grand Prix de France	Bugatti Circuit
10	4 August	(United Kingdom) Marlboro British Grand Prix	Silverstone Circuit
11	10 August	(Sweden) Swedish TT	Scandinavian Raceway
12	1 September	Grand Prix San Marino	Circuito Internazionale Santa Monica

†† = Saturday race

=== Calendar changes ===
- The Nations Grand Prix was moved back, from 15 April to 26 May and it was moved from the Circuito Internazionale Santa Monica to the Mugello Circuit, while the San Marino Grand Prix moved from the Mugello Circuit to the Circuito Internazionale Santa Monica.
- The German Grand Prix moved from the Nürburgring to the Hockenheimring.
- The French Grand Prix was moved back, from 11 June to 21 July and it was moved from the Paul Ricard circuit to the Bugatti Circuit in Le Mans.

== Results and standings ==
=== Grands Prix ===
Round	Date	Race	Location	80cc winner	125cc winner	250cc winner	500cc winner	Report
1	23 March	(South Africa) South African Grand Prix	Kyalami			(United States) Freddie Spencer	(United States) Eddie Lawson	Report
2	5 May	(Spain) Spanish Grand Prix	Jarama	(Spain) Jorge Martínez	(Italy) Pier Paolo Bianchi	(Venezuela) Carlos Lavado	(United States) Freddie Spencer	Report
3	19 May	(Germany) German Grand Prix	Hockenheim	(Switzerland) Stefan Dörflinger	(Austria) August Auinger	(West Germany) Martin Wimmer	(France) Christian Sarron	Report
4	26 May	(Italy) Italian Grand Prix	Mugello	(Spain) Jorge Martínez	(Italy) Pier Paolo Bianchi	(United States) Freddie Spencer	(United States) Freddie Spencer	Report
5	2 June	(Austria) Austrian Grand Prix	Salzburgring		(Italy) Fausto Gresini	(United States) Freddie Spencer	(United States) Freddie Spencer	Report
6	16 June	(Socialist Federal Republic of Yugoslavia) Yugoslavian Grand Prix	Rijeka	(Switzerland) Stefan Dörflinger		(United States) Freddie Spencer	(United States) Eddie Lawson	Report
7	29 June	(Netherlands) Dutch TT	Assen	(Austria) Gerd Kafka	(Italy) Pier Paolo Bianchi	(United States) Freddie Spencer	(United States) Randy Mamola	Report
8	7 July	(Belgium) Belgian Grand Prix	Spa		(Italy) Fausto Gresini	(United States) Freddie Spencer	(United States) Freddie Spencer	Report
9	21 July	(France) French Grand Prix	Le Mans	(Spain) Ángel Nieto	(Italy) Ezio Gianola	(United States) Freddie Spencer	(United States) Freddie Spencer	Report
10	4 August	(United Kingdom) British Grand Prix	Silverstone		(Austria) August Auinger	(Germany) Anton Mang	(United States) Freddie Spencer	Report
11	10 August	(Sweden) Swedish Grand Prix	Anderstorp		(Austria) August Auinger	(Germany) Anton Mang	(United States) Freddie Spencer	Report
12	1 September	San Marino Grand Prix	Misano	(Spain) Jorge Martínez	(Italy) Fausto Gresini	(Venezuela) Carlos Lavado	(United States) Eddie Lawson	Report

== Participants ==
=== 500cc participants ===
Team	Constructor	Motorcycle	No.	Rider	Rounds
Marlboro Team Agostini	Yamaha	Yamaha YZR500 (OW 81)	1	(United States) Eddie Lawson	All
Marlboro Team Agostini	Yamaha	Yamaha YZR500 (OW 81)	3	(France) Raymond Roche	All
Marlboro Team Agostini	Yamaha	Yamaha YZR500 (OW 81)	26	(Japan) Tadahiko Taira	4–5
Rothmans Honda/Mamola	Honda	Honda NS500; Honda NSR500	2	(United States) Randy Mamola	All
Rothmans Honda/HRC	Honda	Honda NSR500	4	(United States) Freddie Spencer	1–11
Rothmans Honda Britain	Honda	Honda NS500	5	(United Kingdom) Ron Haslam	All
Rothmans Honda Britain	Honda	Honda NS500; Honda NSR500	7	(Australia) Wayne Gardner	All
Rothmans Honda Britain	Honda	Honda RS500	22	(United Kingdom) Roger Burnett	10
Rothmans Honda Britain	Honda	Honda RS500	51	(United Kingdom) Roger Marshall	10
Team Gauloises Yamaha	Yamaha	Yamaha YZR500 (OW 81)	6	(France) Christian Sarron	All
Shell-Toshiba Racing Team	Honda	Honda RS500	8	(Netherlands) Boet van Dulmen	All
Team Honda Benelux-Elf	Honda	Honda NS500	9	(Belgium) Didier de Radiguès	All
Team Honda Benelux-Elf	Honda	Honda NS500	57; 63	(France) Pierre-Etienne Samin	7, 9
Team Elf c/o ROC	Elf-Honda	Elf 2	34; 39; 32; 31; 36; 44; 53; 45; 40; 33	(France) Christian Le Liard	All
Cagiva	Cagiva	Cagiva C10	10	(Italy) Virginio Ferrari	12
Cagiva	Cagiva	Cagiva C10	58; 43	(Italy) Marco Lucchinelli	6–8, 12
Chevallier	Chevallier-Honda	Honda RS500	12	(France) Thierry Espié	1, 6–8, 10–12
HB Suzuki GP Team	Suzuki	Suzuki RG500 (XR70)	13	(Italy) Franco Uncini	1, 3–12
HB Suzuki GP Team	Suzuki	Suzuki RG500 (XR70)	30	(Spain) Sito Pons	All
Racing Team Katayama	Honda	Honda RS500 Bakker	14	(Japan) Takazumi Katayama	2–3, 5–8
Skoal Bandit Heron Suzuki	Suzuki	Suzuki RG500 (XR70)	19; 33	(United Kingdom) Rob McElnea	All
Skoal Bandit Heron Suzuki	Suzuki	Suzuki RG500 (XR70)	55; 25	(Australia) Paul Lewis	10, 12
??	Honda	Honda RS500	20	(Finland) Eero Hyvärinen	2–12
Myers Motorcycles	Suzuki	Suzuki RGB500	21	(United Kingdom) Gary Lingham	3–5, 10
??	Paton	Paton V 90 BM 4	27	(Italy) Massimo Broccoli	1–2, 4–6
Zwafink + Wilbers Racing	Honda	Honda RS500 Bakker	28	(West Germany) Gustav Reiner	1, 6–12
SDC Builders	Honda	Honda RS500	29	(United Kingdom) Keith Huewen	1, 3–5, 10
Team Italia	Honda	Honda RS500	32; 31; 34; 16	(Italy) Fabio Biliotti	All
Team Italia	Honda	Honda RS500	42; 38; 39; 31	(Italy) Armando Errico	2–3, 6–12
Team Italia	Honda	Honda RS500	57; 51; 36; 50; 48; 32	(Italy) Massimo Messere	1, 6–12
Michael Baldwin Racing	Honda	Honda NS500	33; 31; 18; 11	(United States) Mike Baldwin	All
Sid Griffiths Racing/Duckhams	Suzuki	Suzuki RGB500	33; 36; 43	(United Kingdom) Simon Buckmaster	2–3, 5, 9–11
Team Arnetoli	Suzuki Paton	Suzuki RGB500; Paton V 90 BM 4	41; 38	(Italy) Marco Papa	3–4, 6–8, 12
Kreepy Krauly Racing Team	Honda	Honda RS500	42; 54; 49; 38; 33; 32	(Zimbabwe) Dave Petersen	All
DAF Trucks	Honda	Honda RS500	46; 62	(Austria) Karl Truchsess	3–5, 7, 10, 12
Frankonia Suzuki	Suzuki	Suzuki RGB500	47; 52; 34	(Switzerland) Wolfgang von Muralt	All
Nimag/Oud Bier	Suzuki	Suzuki RGB500	52; 56; 37	(Netherlands) Rob Punt	5, 7–12
Stichting Nederlands Racing Team	Honda	Honda RS500	53; 43	(Netherlands) Henk van der Mark	2, 4–5, 7–8
Stichting Nederlands Racing Team	Honda	Honda RS500	54	(Netherlands) Mile Pajic	2, 7–8
Jim Finlay Racing	Suzuki	Suzuki RGB500	60; 59	(United Kingdom) Neil Robinson	2–4, 8–10
??	Suzuki	Suzuki RGB500	??	(Luxembourg) Andy Leuthe	4, 6, 9, 11–12

Key
Regular Rider
Wildcard Rider
Replacement Rider

=== 250cc participants ===
Team	Constructor	Motorcycle	No.	Rider	Rounds
Massa Racing Racing Team	Real-Rotax	??	2	(West Germany) Manfred Herweh	1, 7–12
Venemotos Racing Team	Yamaha	Yamaha OW17	3	(Venezuela) Carlos Lavado	All
Venemotos Racing Team	Yamaha	Yamaha OW17	16	(Venezuela) Iván Palazzese	1–5
Agrati Garelli	Garelli	??	4	(Spain) Ángel Nieto	??
Agrati Garelli	Garelli	??	32	(Italy) Maurizio Vitali	1–2, 4–5, 9, 12
Marlboro Team Toni Mang	Honda	Honda RS250R	5	(West Germany) Anton Mang	All
Team Parisienne-Elf	Honda Parisienne	Honda RS250R ??	6	(Switzerland) Jacques Cornu	All
Team Parisienne-Elf	Parisienne Honda	?? Honda RS250R	41; 44	(France) Pierre Bolle	3–12
Lui-Yamaha Racing Team	Yamaha	Yamaha OW17	7	(West Germany) Martin Wimmer	1–8
Donington Park	Honda	Honda RS250R	9	(United Kingdom) Alan Carter	All
Venemotos Racing Team	Pernod Yamaha	Pernod 250GP; Yamaha OW17	10	(France) Jean-François Baldé	1–3, 6, 8–12
Venemotos Racing Team	Pernod Yamaha	Pernod 250GP; Yamaha OW17	62	(France) Jacques Onda	??
Römer Racing Team	Yamaha	Yamaha OW17	13	(West Germany) Reinhold Roth	1–4, 6, 10–12
Römer Racing Team	Yamaha	Yamaha OW17	48; 44	(West Germany) Harald Eckl	1, 3–4, 6–7, 9–11
Römer Racing Team	Honda	Honda RS250R	61	(West Germany) Karl Grässel	3–5
E.S.T.	Yamaha	Yamaha OW17	14	(France) Jean-Michel Mattioli	1–4, 6–12
Promoto E.S.T.	Cobas Scrab	?? ??	15	(France) Patrick Fernandez	1–3, 5–6
Monnet Racing	EBB	??	17	(Austria) August Auinger	2–8, 10–12
Rothmans Honda/HRC	Honda	Honda NSR250	19	(United States) Freddie Spencer	1–10
Exactweld GB Ltd	Exactweld EMC	?? ??	20	(United Kingdom) Gary Noel	11–12
??	Yamaha	Yamaha OW17	21	(France) Philippe Pagano	??
??	Yamaha	Yamaha OW17	22	(France) Jean-luc Guillemet	9
??	Yamaha Cobas	Yamaha OW17 ??	25	(Chile) Vincenzo Cascino	??
Team Heukerott	Yamaha	Yamaha OW17	27	(South Africa) Mario Rademeyer	1, 9–10, 12
Ernie Coates Racing	Honda	Honda RS250R	29	(United Kingdom) Joey Dunlop	10
Team Italia	Malanca MBA	Malanca 250 GP ??	30	(Italy) Stefano Caracchi	4, 7–12
Rothmans Honda Italia	Honda	Honda RS250R	35; 33; 37	(Italy) Fausto Ricci	1–2, 4–12
J.J. Cobas	Cobas-Rotax	??	35; 33	(Spain) Carlos Cardús	All
J.J. Cobas	Cobas-Rotax	??	40; 46; 45	(Spain) Joan Garriga	1–6, 8–12
Team Yamaha Total	Yamaha	Yamaha OW17	36; 34	(Belgium) Stéphane Mertens	1–2, 7–12
Silverstone Armstrong GP Team	Armstrong-Rotax	Armstrong CF250	39; 36; 53	(United Kingdom) Donnie Mcleod	1–8, 11–12
Silverstone Armstrong GP Team	Armstrong-Rotax	Armstrong CF250	62; 67; 49; 59	(United Kingdom) Niall Mackenzie	All
??	Cobas	??	39	(Spain) Luis Miguel Reyes	1–4, 7–9, 11
??	Chevallier-Yamaha	Yamaha OW17	40; 46	(France) Jean Foray	2–3, 6–12
Aprilia Racing Team	Aprilia-Rotax	??	41	(Italy) Loris Reggiani	1, 3–8, 12
Höstettler/Yamaha	Yamaha	Yamaha OW17	43; 42	(Switzerland) Roland Freymond	2–12
Höstettler/Yamaha	Rotax	??	43	(Austria) Hans Lindner	3, 5–8
RS Rallye Sport	Yamaha	Yamaha OW17	47; 1; 40	(Austria) Siegfried Minich	1, 3–12
Antonio Gutierrez	Arbizu-Rotax	??	48	(United Kingdom) Geoff Fowler	??
M.I.G	MIG-Rotax	??	49; 38	(France) Jean-Louis Guignabodet	2–12
Ehrlich Automotive Ltd.	EMC-Rotax	??	50	(United Kingdom) Andy Watts	??
Dieter Braun PVM Team	Yamaha	Yamaha OW17	51	(West Germany) Hans Becker	1, 3, 5–8, 10
??	Kobas	??	53	(Spain) Antonio Garcia Moreno	??
??	Yamaha-KYF	Yamaha OW17	54	(France) Michel Galbit	2–3, 5–6, 11
Segura	Yamaha	Yamaha OW17	55; 42; 47	(France) Thierry Rapicault	2–7, 9–11
??	Yamaha Rotax	Yamaha OW17 ??	55	(Switzerland) Edwin Weibel	8
Rothmans Honda France	Honda	Honda RS250R	67; 63; 60	(France) Dominique Sarron	3–12
Rothmans Honda France	Honda	Honda RS250R	70	(France) Patrick Igoa	2, 8–9
??	Morena Rotax	?? ??	69	(Belgium) René Délaby	4, 6–8, 12
??	Yamaha Kobas	Yamaha OW17 ??	72	(Brazil) Antonio Neto	4–5, 9–12

Key
Regular Rider
Wildcard Rider
Replacement Rider

=== 500cc riders' standings ===
Scoring system

Points are awarded to the top ten finishers. A rider has to finish the race to earn points.

Position	1st	2nd	3rd	4th	5th	6th	7th	8th	9th	10th
Points	15	12	10	8	6	5	4	3	2	1

Pos	Rider	Team	Machine	RSA (South Africa)	ESP (Spain)	GER (Germany)	NAT (Italy)	AUT (Austria)	YUG (Socialist Federal Republic of Yugoslavia)	NED (Netherlands)	BEL (Belgium)	FRA (France)	GBR (United Kingdom)	SWE (Sweden)	RSM (San Marino)	Points
1	(United States) Freddie Spencer	Rothmans Honda-HRC	NSR500	2	1	2	1	1	2	DNF	1	1	1	1		141
2	(United States) Eddie Lawson	Marlboro Yamaha-Agostini	YZR500	1	2	4	2	2	1	DNF	2	4	2	2	1	133
3	(France) Christian Sarron	Sonauto Gauloises-Yamaha	YZR500	6	3	1	5	3	5	DNF	3	DNF	3	4	DNF	80
4	(Australia) Wayne Gardner	Rothmans Honda Britain	NS500/NSR500	3	4	6	3	15	3	3	4	DNF	DNF	DNF	2	73
5	(United Kingdom) Ron Haslam	Rothmans Honda Britain	NS500	4	8	3	6	16	4	2	6	5	14	3	5	73
6	(United States) Randy Mamola	Rothmans Honda-HRC	NS500/NSR500	5	DNF	8	4	4	DNF	1	DNF	3	5	5	3	72
7	(France) Raymond Roche	Marlboro Yamaha-Agostini	YZR500	DNF	5	13	7	10	6	DNF	5	2	6	8	4	50
8	(Belgium) Didier de Radiguès	Team Honda Benelux-Elf	NS500	7	6	5	10	6	7	6	7	DNF	4	6	DNF	47
9	(United Kingdom) Rob McElnea	Skoal Bandit Heron Suzuki	RG500	DNF	DNF	7	9	5	8	7	DNF	DNF	DNF	DNF	10	20
10	(Netherlands) Boet van Dulmen	Shell-Toshiba Racing Team	RS500	18	DNF	10	13	8	14	4	9	DNF	7	14	17	18
11	(United States) Mike Baldwin	Michael Baldwin Racing	RS500/NS500	9	7	DNF	11	7		DNF	11	10		7	8	18
12	(France) Pierre-Etienne Samin	Team Honda Benelux-Elf	RS500							5		6				11
13	(Spain) Sito Pons	HB Gallina-Suzuki	RG500	8	9	9	DNF	DNF	11	DNF	15	7	DNF	DNF	11	11
14	(Germany) Gustav Reiner	Zwafink Wilbers Racing	Bakker-NS500	14				12	9	DNF	10	8	DNF	DNF	7	10
15	(Italy) Franco Uncini	HB Gallina-Suzuki	RG500	11	DNS	DNF	8	13	DNF	13	13	12	18	DNF	6	8
16	(Italy) Fabio Biliotti	Team Italia	RS500	16	10	25	12	DNF	12	12	DNF	9	19	22	9	5
17	(Netherlands) Mile Pajic	Stichting Nederlands Racing Team	RS500		DNF					8	21					3
18	(Japan) Takazumi Katayama	Katayama Racing Team	Bakker-NS500		DNF	11	DNS	14	DNF	DNF	8					3
19	(United Kingdom) Roger Burnett	Rothmans Honda Britain	RS500										8			3
20	(France) Thierry Espié	Chevallier	Chevallier-RS500	10	DNS		DNS	DNF	DNF	DNF	12	DNS	DNF	9	DNF	3
21	(Japan) Tadahiko Taira	Marlboro Yamaha-Agostini	YZR500				15	9								2
22	(Netherlands) Henk van der Mark	Stichting Nederlands Racing Team	RS500		11		18	DNF		9	18					2
23	(United Kingdom) Neil Robinson	Jim Finlay Racing	RG500		DNF	12	DNF				24	DNF	9	DNS		2
24	(Zimbabwe) Dave Petersen	Kreepy Krauly Racing Team	RS500	12	DNF	DNF	14	20	10	DNF	DNF	DNF	11	12	14	1
25	(Netherlands) Rob Punt	Nimag/Oud Bier	RG500					24		10	20	14	13	15	DNF	1
26	(Australia) Paul Lewis	Skoal Bandit Heron Suzuki	RG500										10		15	1
27	(Italy) Massimo Messere	Team Italia	RS500	13	DNS	DNS			22	11	16	DNF	24	10	12	1
	(Finland) Eero Hyvarinen		RS500		15	16	DNF	11	13	DNF	19	DNF	DNF	11	18	0
	(Italy) Armando Ericco	Team Italia	RS500	DNS	DNF	28	DNS		18	15	17	11	DNF	DNF	DNF	0
	(Germany) Klaus Klein		RG500	DNF	12	15										0
	(United Kingdom) Chris Martin		RG500										12			0
	(Switzerland) Wolfgang von Muralt	Frankonia Suzuki	RGB500	15	13	DNF	17	17	16	DNF	DNF	13	15	DNF	13	0
	(Sweden) Peter Linden		RS500		DNF	27								13		0
	(France) Christian Le Liard	Team Elf/ROC	RS500	DNF	DNF	DNF	16	19	17	DNF	14	DNF	16	23	DNF	0
	(Italy) Marco Gentile					14		25				DNF				0
	(Germany) Manfred Fischer		RS500			17		21		14	22					0
	(France) Louis-Luc Maisto		RG500		14				DNF			DNF				0
	(Germany) Dietmar Mayer		RS500		DNF				20	DNQ	26	15			DNF	0
	(Italy) Marco Lucchinelli	Cagiva	GP500						15	DNF	DNF				DNF	0
	(Spain) Antonio Perez		RG500		16										21	0
	(Italy) Leandro Becheroni						19		27						16	0
	(United Kingdom) Ray Swann	Aldridge Racing	RG500							16			20			0
	(France) Maurice Coq											16				0
	(Finland) Esko Kuparinen													16		0
	(United Kingdom) Simon Buckmaster	Sid Griffiths Racing	RG500		17	DNF		27		DNQ		17	26	17		0
	(United Kingdom) Paul Iddon	David Brown Racing	RG500			19		22		17	23		21			0
	(Italy) Alessandro Valesi		RS500	17	DNF				DNS							0
	(United Kingdom) Steve Parrish	Mitsui-Yamaha	YZR500							DNF			17			0
	(Italy) Marco Papa	Team Arnetoli	RG500/Paton500			26	20		19	18	25		DNQ		19	0
	(Netherlands) Maarten Duyzers		RG500			23				19	27		23	18		0
	(Luxembourg) Andy Leuthe		RG500		DNQ	DNQ	23		24			18		21	20	0
	(Austria) Karl Truchsess	DAF Trucks	RS500			DNF	21	18	DNS	DNF			27		DNF	0
	(Spain) Carlos Morante		RG500		18								DNQ		22	0
	(Germany) Georg-Robert Jung		RG500			18		DNF			28					0
	(United Kingdom) Keith Huewen	SDC Builders	RS500	19	DNS	30	DNF	23					DNF			0
	(Norway) Geir Hestman		RS500											19		0
	(Italy) Paolo Ferretti			20		DNF	DNF									0
	(Germany) Rainer Sautter		RG500			20										0
	(United Kingdom) David Griffith		RG500							DNQ			DNQ	20		0
	(Italy) Massimo Broccoli		RG500	DNF	DNF		DNF	DNF	21							0
	(Sweden) Peter Skold		RS500		DNF	21								DNF		0
	(Greece) Dimitrios Papandreou		YZR500	21					25							0
	(United Kingdom) Gary Lingham	Myers Motorcycles	RG500	DNS	DNQ	DNF	22	28					DNF			0
	(Germany) Andreas Woditsch		YZR500			22										0
	(United Kingdom) Trevor Nation		RG500										22			0
	(Austria) Josef Ragginger		RG500			24		DNF	23							0
	(Greece) Stelio Marmaras		RG500									DNF			23	0
	(Sweden) Lars Johansson		RG500											24		0
	(United Kingdom) Barry Woodland		RG500										25			0
	(Austria) Josef Doppler					DNQ		26	26							0
	(United Kingdom) Mark Ordridge		RG500										28			0
	(Czechoslovakia) Bohumil Staša					29			Ret							0
	(United Kingdom) Mark Salle	Royal Cars	RG500			DNF	DNF			DNF			DNF			0
	(Brazil) Marco Greco		RS500	DNF	DNQ											0
	(Spain) Antonio Boronat		RG500		DNF											0
	(Germany) Gerold Fisher					DNF										0
	(Italy) Paolo Cipriani		RG500				DNF									0
	(Italy) Romolo Balbi						DNF									0
	(Czechoslovakia) Pavol Dekánek		RG500						DNF							0
	(France) Rene Lavigne		RS500									DNF				0
	(United Kingdom) Roger Marshall	Rothmans Honda Britain	RS500										DNF			0
	(United Kingdom) Alan Jeffrey		RG500										DNF			0
	(Denmark) Kjeld Sorensen		RG500											DNF		0
	(Sweden) Michael Jansberg		RG500											DNF		0
	(Italy) Virginio Ferrari	Cagiva	GP500												DNF	0
	(France) Claude Arciero		RS500									DNS				0
	(Denmark) Claus Wulff		RG500											DNS		0
	(Sweden) Gunnar Bruhn		RG500											DNS		0
	(Netherlands) Peter Lemstra		RG500							DNQ			DNQ			0
	(Germany) Helmut Schutz		RG500			DNQ								DNQ		0
	(Netherlands) Harrie Heutmekers		RG500			DNQ										0
	(Germany) Lothar Spiegler		RG500			DNQ										0
	(United Kingdom) Toni Moran		RG500										DNQ			0
	(United Kingdom) Des Barry		YZR500										DNQ			0
	(Austria) Erich Sanders		RG500											DNQ		0

=== 250cc standings ===
Place	Rider	Team	Machine	RSA (South Africa)	ESP (Spain)	GER (Germany)	NAT (Italy)	AUT (Austria)	YUG (Socialist Federal Republic of Yugoslavia)	NED (Netherlands)	BEL (Belgium)	FRA (France)	GBR (United Kingdom)	SWE (Sweden)	RSM (San Marino)	Points
1	(United States) Freddie Spencer	Rothmans Honda-HRC	RS250RW	1	9	2	1	1	1	1	1	1	4			127
2	(West Germany) Anton Mang	Marlboro-Toni Mang	RS250	2	3	3	5	2	DNF	3	3	2	1	1	2	124
3	(Venezuela) Carlos Lavado	Venemotos Yamaha	YZR250	4	1	DNF	2	9	2	DNF	2	5	DNF	2	1	94
4	(West Germany) Martin Wimmer	Lui-Yamaha Racing Team	YZR250	5	2	1	DNF	4	4	2	4	DNS				69
5	(Italy) Fausto Ricci	Rothmans-Honda Italia	RS250	9	DNF	DNS	3	3	DNF	DNF	19	3	8	3	6	50
6	(Italy) Loris Reggiani	Aprilia Racing Team	Aprilia-Rotax	12	DNS	9	4	5	3	4	DNF				3	44
7	(United Kingdom) Alan Carter	Donington Park	RS250	16	4	4	9	17	DNF	13	9	DNF	7	4	DNF	32
8	(West Germany) Manfred Herweh	Massa Real Racing Team	Real-Rotax	DNF	DNS					23	6	4	3	DNF	4	31
9	(West Germany) Reinhold Roth	Römer Racing Team	YZR250	22	5	11	8	DNS	7	8	DNF	DNF	2	13	10	29
10	(Switzerland) Jacques Cornu	Team Parisienne-Elf	RS250	10	11	19	7	13	9	5	11	7	9	5	16	25
11	(France) Pierre Bolle	Team Parisienne-Elf	RS250		DNQ	13	10	8	8	11	DNF	6	6	6	DNF	22
12	(Spain) Carlos Cardus	J.J. Cobas	Cobas-Rotax	6	DNF	5	DNF	DNF	DNF	DNF	5	DNF	DNF	DNF	7	21
13	(France) Jean Michel Mattioli	E.S.T.	YZR250	11	DNF	12	DNF	DNQ	11	7	DNF	13	5	8	5	19
14	(United Kingdom) Donnie McLeod	Silverstone Armstrong-Rotax	CF250	19	DNF	6	DNF	19	DNF	6	DNF	DNS	DNQ	7	DNF	14
15	(South Africa) Mario Rademeyer	Team Heukerott	YZR250	3	DNS			DNS			DNQ	21	17		DNF	10
16	(Austria) Siegried Minich	RS Rallye Sport	YZR250	DNF	DNQ	24	18	10	5	12	13	DNF	DNF	9	DNF	9
17	(Spain) Luis Miguel Reyes		Cobas-Rotax	20	7	7	DNF			21	12	10	DNS	DNF	DNS	9
18	(Spain) Juan Garriga	J.J. Cobas	Cobas-Rotax	DNF	18	DNF	11	7	DNF	DNS	7	11	20	14	14	8
19	(France) Jean-François Baldé	Pernod-Yamaha	YZR250	7	10	22			13		DNF	8	DNF	11	22	8
20	(Belgium) Stephane Mertens	Team Yamaha Total	YZR250	8	DNF					9	DNF	DNF	16	22	8	8
21	(France) Dominique Sarron	Rothmans Honda France	RS250		DNQ	27	15	18	15	DNF	8	9	13	16	9	7
22	(Italy) Maurizio Vitali	Agrati Garelli	Garelli	13	6	DNS	DNF	15				DNF			DNF	5
23	(Germany) Harald Eckl	Römer Racing Team	YZR250	17	DNF	26	12	DNF	6	19	DNF	16	18	15	DNF	5
24	(Austria) Hans Lindner		Rotax			30		6	DNF	15	DNF					5
25	(Switzerland) Roland Freymond	Höstettler-Yamaha	YZR250		13	DNF	6	16	19	17	22	15	DNF	12	DNF	5
26	(France) Jean Foray	Chevallier	Chevallier-Yamaha		12	8	DNQ		14	10	17	DNF	21	18	12	4
27	(Austria) August Auinger	Monnet Racing	EBB	DNS	8	17	DNF	11	DNF	18	14	DNS	DNF	DNF	20	3
28	(France) Patrick Igoa	Rothmans Honda France	RS250		DNF	DNS					10	17				1
29	(United Kingdom) Joey Dunlop	Ernie Coates Racing	RS250										10			1
30	(France) Jean-Louis Guignabodet	M.I.G.	MIG-Rotax		16	DNF	20	DNF	10	16	DNF	DNF	DNF	DNF	21	1
31	(France) Thierry Rapicault	Segura	YZR250		DNF	10	14	12	DNF	DNF	DNQ	12	22	DNF		1
32	(United Kingdom) Niall Mackenzie	Silverstone Armstrong-Rotax	CF250	24	DNF	DNF	DNF	14	16	14	DNF	14	DNF	10	DNF	1
	(Brazil) Antonio Neto		Cobas-Rotax		DNS	DNQ	17	DNF	DNS			DNF	DNF	DNF	11	0
	(United Kingdom) Kenny Irons	Luton Insulation Services Yamaha	YZR250										11			0
	(Austria) Josef Hutter		Bartol-Yamaha					22	12							0
	(United Kingdom) Tony Head		CF250									DNQ	12	25		0
	(Italy) Massimo Matteoni		RS250	21	20	DNF	13		24			18				0
	(Italy) Stefano Caracchi	Team Italia	Malanca/MBA		DNQ		DNF			24	20	19	DNF	23	13	0
	(Venezuela) Ivan Palazzese	Venemotos Yamaha	YZR250	14	17	DNF	16	DNF								0
	(France) Michel Galbit		YZR250		14	DNF	DNQ	20	22			DNQ	15	20	DNQ	0
	(United Kingdom) Andy Watts	Ehrlich Automotive Ltd.	EMC-Rotax	DNF	DNQ	25	DNQ	DNF		22	DNQ		14		25	0
	(Switzerland) Constant Pittet		YZR250			14						DNQ				0
	(Switzerland) Edwin Weibel		YZR250			15	DNS	DNF		20	18	DNQ	DNQ	19	24	0
	(United Kingdom) Geoff Fowler	Antonio Gutierrez	YZR250		15	21	DNF	DNQ		DNF	DNQ		DNF			0
	(France) Patrick Fernandez		Cobas-Rotax	15	DNQ	DNF	DNQ	23	DNF	DNQ	DNQ	DNF				0
	(Italy) Marcello Lucchi		Malanca				23								15	0
	(France) Guy Bertin		Malanca	DNQ					DNS	DNQ	15	DNS				0
	(United Kingdom) Gary Noel	Exactweld GB Ltd	EMC-Rotax	DNF	DNF	16	DNS				DNQ		DNF	17	19	0
	(Germany) Hans Becker	Dieter Braun PVM Team	YZR250	26	DNQ	20		24	21	DNF	16	DNQ	19			0
	(France) Jean-Luc Guillemet		YZR250	DNQ	DNS	DNF	DNQ	DNQ	17	26	DNQ	20	DNQ	DNQ		0
	(Italy) Massimo Broccoli		Aprilia-Rotax												17	0
	(Germany) Karl-Thomas Grassel		RS250		DNQ	18	19	21							DNQ	0
	(Belgium) Rene Delaby		Rotax		DNQ	DNF	21	DNF	18	25	21	DNQ	DNF	DNF	23	0
	(South Africa) Robbie Petersen		RS250	18												0
	(Italy) Philippe Pagano		YZR250	DNQ	19	DNQ	DNQ					DNQ	DNQ	28	26	0
	(Austria) Thomas Bacher		Rotax					25	20			DNF				0
	(Sweden) Eilert Lundstedt		YZR250											21		0
	(France) Gabriel Grabia		YZR250		DNF		22					DNQ				0
	(Spain) Antonio Garcia		Cobas-Rotax	DNQ	DNF	23	DNF	DNF	DNF	DNF	DNF	DNQ	DNQ		DNQ	0
	(Socialist Federal Republic of Yugoslavia) Silvio Habat		YZR250					DNQ	23							0
	(South Africa) Dave Estment		RS250	23												0
	(Sweden) Johnny Simonsson		YZR250											24		0
	(South Africa) Dave Emond		YZR250	25												0
	(Austria) Erich Klein		Rotax				DNF	26	DNS							0
	(Denmark) Svend Andersson		YZR250											26		0
	(Denmark) Anders Skov		YZR250		DNF					DNF				27		0
	(United Kingdom) Steve Williams	Fowler Yamaha	YZR250	27								DNQ	DNF			0
	(Netherlands) Cees Doorakkers		RS250		DNQ	28				DNQ	DNQ	DNQ				0
	(United Kingdom) Russell Wood		YZR250	28												0
	(Germany) Konrad Hefele		YZR250			29										0
	(France) Jacky Onda	Pernod-Yamaha	YZR250	DNF	DNQ	DNQ						DNF	DNQ	DNQ	DNQ	0
	(France) Eric Saul		Parenti				DNQ				DNQ	DNF	DNQ		DNF	0
	(Netherlands) Mar Schouten		YZR250			DNQ				DNQ	DNF					0
	(Germany) Hans Besendorfer		YZR250	DNF				DNQ				DNQ				0
	(France) Raphael Fernandez		Cobas-Rotax		DNF											0
	(United Kingdom) Tony Rogers		YZR250										DNF			0
	(Italy) Andrea Brasini		YZR250				DNS									0
	(United Kingdom) Kevin Mitchell	Decorite Racing	Decorite Rotax										DNS			0
	(United Kingdom) Steve Chambers	Lease Haulage Yamaha	YZR250										DNS			0
	(Chile) Vincenzo Cascino		YZR250	DNQ	DNQ		DNQ	DNQ					DNQ		DNQ	0
	(Spain) Angel Nieto	Agrati Garelli	Garelli	DNQ	DNQ	DNQ										0
	(Germany) Hubert Abold		RS250				DNQ	DNQ							DNQ	0
	(Italy) Davide Tardozzi		Malanca	DNQ			DNQ								DNQ	0
	(Italy) Paolo Ferretti		Malanca							DNQ	DNQ				DNQ	0
	(Belgium) Eric de Donker		RS250			DNQ					DNQ					0
	(Belgium) Jose de Faveri	JDF									DNQ				DNQ	0
	(South Africa) Kevin Hellyer		YZR250	DNQ												0
	(South Africa) Leonard Dibon		YZR250	DNQ												0
	(South Africa) Jean D'Assonville		YZR250	DNQ												0
	(United Kingdom) Peter Hubbard	Capital Glass Racing	Rotax	DNQ												0
	(South Africa) Ronan Schulz		YZR250	DNQ												0
	(South Africa) Graham Singer		Rotax	DNQ												0
	(South Africa) Danny Bristol		YZR250	DNQ												0
	(South Africa) Warren Bristol		YZR250	DNQ												0
	(Spain) Eduardo Cots	Arbizu			DNQ											0
	(Venezuela) Luis Lavado	Venemotos Yamaha	YZR250		DNQ											0
	(Venezuela) Eduardo Aleman	Venemotos Yamaha	YZR250		DNQ											0
	(Germany) Herbert Haul		Seel			DNQ										0
	(Germany) Franz Wagner		YZR250			DNQ										0
	(Germany) Roland Busch		YZR250			DNQ										0
	(Germany) Martin Fug		YZR250			DNQ										0
	(Germany) Franz Lederer		Rotax			DNQ										0
	(Italy) Fabio Marcaccini		YZR250				DNQ									0
	(Italy) Gianfranco Singer		Ametoli				DNQ									0
	(Austria) Stefan Klabacher		Rotax					DNQ								0
	(Austria) Manfred Obinger		YZR250					DNQ								0
	(Netherlands) Gerard van der Wal		YZR250							DNQ						0
	(Belgium) Michel Simeon		RS250								DNQ					0
	(Belgium) Bernard Denis		RS250								DNQ					0
	(France) Christian Boudinot		Cobas-Rotax									DNQ				0
	(France) Guy Olla		YZR250									DNQ				0
	(France) Christian Andrieu		YZR250									DNQ				0
	(France) Gerard Vallee		YZR250									DNQ				0
	(France) Alain Bronec		YZR250									DNQ				0
	(United Kingdom) Rob Orme	John Bull Yamaha	YZR250										DNQ			0
	(United Kingdom) Terry Paviell		YZR250										DNQ			0
	(Sweden) Peter Granath	Harris Performance Products												DNQ		0
	(Sweden) Bengt Elgh		MBA											DNQ		0
	(Sweden) Bobby Issazadhe	ISV												DNQ		0
	(Norway) Han Hansebraten	Tommy												DNQ		0
	(Finland) Jarmo Lilitia	Mevi												DNQ		0
	(Finland) Tapio Virtanen		Rotax											DNQ		0
	(Italy) Massimo Messere		RS250												DNQ	0
	(Switzerland) Sergio Pellandini		RS250												DNQ	0

=== 125cc final standings ===
Place	Rider	Machine	ESP (Spain)	GER (Germany)	NAT (Italy)	AUT (Austria)	NED (Netherlands)	BEL (Belgium)	FRA (France)	GBR (United Kingdom)	SWE (Sweden)	RSM (San Marino)	Points
1	(Italy) Fausto Gresini	Garelli	2	2	DNF	1	3	1	2	4	3	1	109
2	(Italy) Pier Paolo Bianchi	MBA	1	3	1	4	1	5	5	2	2	DNF	99
3	(Austria) August Auinger	Monnet	DNF	1	DNF	2	8	4	7	1	1	5	78
4	(Italy) Ezio Gianola	Garelli	4	DNF	2	3	2		1	DNF	4	2	77
5	(Switzerland) Bruno Kneubühler	LCR	6	7	4	5	6	2	3	DNF	DNF	4	58
6	(Italy) Domenico Brigaglia	MBA	3	4	DNF	11	DNS	7	4	6	6	6	45
7	(France) Jean-Claude Selini	MBA	5	DNF	5	10	4	DNF	6	3	DNF	11	36
8	(Finland) Jussi Hautaniemi	MBA	15	11	7	28	5	10	12	5	5	8	26
9	(Belgium) Lucio Pietroniro	MBA	12	DNF	3	7	16	3	DNS		10	14	25
10	(Belgium) Olivier Liegeois	KLS	DNF	6	DNF	6	DNF	8	10	8	9	7	23
11	(Finland) Johnny Wickstroem	MBA	7	10	6	16	DNF	9	14	19	7	10	17
12	(Italy) Maurizio Vitali											3	10
13	(Germany) Alfred Waibel	MBA	DNF	5	DNF	9	9	11				DNF	10
14	(Argentina) Willy Perez	MBA	19	14	11	12	DNF	6	11	7	11	12	9
15	(Italy) Giuseppe Ascareggi	MBA	11	DNF	DNF	DNF	DNF	DNF	8	DNF	8	DNF	6
16	(Sweden) Hakan Olsson	MBA		17		8	20	12	9	14	14	22	5
17	(Italy) Luca Cadalora	MBA	DNF	DNF	DNF	30	7	DNS		11	DNS		4
18	(Spain) Andres Sanchez	MBA	10	18	8	15	13	17	16	DNF	DNF	DNF	4
19	(Germany) Willi Hupperich	MBA	13	9	13	22	DNF	DNS		9	17		4
20	(Austria) Mike Leitner	MBA	8	12	DNF	18	15	DNF	21	20	18	20	3
21	(Finland) Esa Kytölä	MBA		8	DNS		DNF	DNF		DNF	DNF		3
22	(Switzerland) Thierry Feuz	MBA	9	13	DNS	DNF	10	13	13	25	DNF	13	3
23	(Italy) Gastone Grassetti											9	2
24	(France) Jacques Hutteau	MBA	17	22	9	13	11	16	17	26	DNF	17	2
25	(France) Michel Escudier	MBA	14	20	10		DNF	24	19	21		DNF	1
26	(Republic of Ireland) Michael McGarrity									10			1
	(Netherlands) Anton Straver	MBA	DNF	19	DNF	14	19	14	DNF	12	DNF	19	0
	(Netherlands) Boy van Erp	MBA		DNF	12	23	DNF	20	22	DNF	DNQ	DNQ	0
	(Netherlands) Jan Eggens	EGA					12	DNQ					0
	(Denmark) Mickel Nielsen	MBA									12		0
	(Switzerland) Peter Sommer	MBA		25			18			24	13		0
	(United Kingdom) David Lowe	MBA								13			0
	(Germany) Wilhelm Lücke	MBA		15	DNF	27	14	DNF	25	DNF			0
	(Czechoslovakia) Peter Balaz	MBA	22	26	14	26	DNQ	21	27			26	0
	(Belgium) Eric Gijsel	MBA					DNF	15	20	15			0
	(Germany) Norbert Peschke	MBA	DNF	DNF	DNF	20	DNF	DNS				15	0
	(France) Paul Bordes	MBA							15				0
	(Denmark) Henrik Rasmussen	MBA									15		0
	(Switzerland) Christoph Bürki	MBA	DNF	DNF	DNF		DNQ	DNQ	DNQ	17	16	23	0
	(United Kingdom) Robin Appleyard	MBA	18	21	DNF	DNF	DNF	DNF	28	16	21	18	0
	(Germany) Helmut Lichtenburg	MBA	20	16	DNF	21	DNF	25				DNF	0
	(Spain) Fernando Gonzalez	MBA	16	DNF	DNF	DNQ		23	23	DNF		24	0
	(United Kingdom) Alex Bedford	MBA		DNF		DNF	DNF	DNF	DNF	DNF	DNF	16	0
	(Germany) Adolf Stadler	MBA	DNF	DNF		24	17	19	DNF			25	0
	(Austria) Karl Dauer	MBA		DNF		17			DNF			DNF	0
	(Denmark) Thomas Møller-Pedersen	MBA	23	23		19	21	18	DNF	22	DNF	DNQ	0
	(Algeria) Bady Hassaine	MBA			DNF			DNF	18	DNS		21	0
	(United Kingdom) Steve Mason	MBA	DNQ	DNQ	DNF		DNF			18			0
	(Sweden) Rune Zälle	MBA									19		0
	(Switzerland) Franz Birrer	MBA		24					DNF		20		0
	(Netherlands) Ton Spek	MBA	25	DNF		DNS	DNF	22	DNS				0
	(Switzerland) Jacques Grandjean	MBA								23			0
	(Spain) Daniel Mateos	MBA	24										0
	(France) Gilles Payraudeau	MBA							24				0
	(Switzerland) Beat Sidler	MBA		DNF		25			26				0
	(Spain) Ramon Pano	Jawa	26										0
	(Sweden) Lars-Erik Kallesö	MBA		27			DNQ			DNF	DNQ		0
	(Socialist Federal Republic of Yugoslavia) Robert Hmeljak	MBA			DNF	29	DNQ		DNQ			DNQ	0
	(France) Jean-Marc Nobleaux	MBA							29				0
	(Germany) Dirk Hafeneger	MBA		DNF				DNF					0
	(Germany) Hubert Abold	MBA								DNF		DNF	0
	(Argentina) Hugo Vignetti	MBA								DNF	DNQ	DNF	0
	(Italy) Fabio Meozzi	MBA		DNQ	DNS	DNF				DNQ		DNQ	0
	(Denmark) Borge Nielsen	Hummel		DNQ							DNF		0
	(Spain) Manuel Herreros	MBA	DNF										0
	(Spain) Angel del Pozo	RB	DNF										0
	(Germany) Manfred Braun	MBA						DNF					0
	(France) Christian Le Badezet	MBA							DNF				0
	(France) Thierry Maurer	MBA								DNF			0
	(Finland) Mogens Johansen	MBA									DNF		0
	(Denmark) Flemming Kistrup	MBA									DNF		0
	(Sweden) Jörgen Ask	MBA									DNF		0
	(Italy) Pierfrancesco Chili	MBA										DNF	0
	(United Kingdom) Ian McConnachie	Krauser			DNS		DNQ						0
	(Finland) Juha Pakkanen	MBA									DNS		0
	(Netherlands) Hein Vink	MBA		DNQ			DNQ	DNQ					0
	(Switzerland) Rene Dünki	MBA		DNQ				DNQ	DNQ				0
	(Germany) Josef Bader	MBA		DNQ		DNQ							0
	(Germany) Alfons Breu	MBA		DNQ		DNQ							0
	(Germany) Klaus Huber	MBA		DNQ									0
	(Germany) Horst Elsenheimer	MBA		DNQ									0
	(Germany) Harald Wiedermann	MBA		DNQ									0
	(Austria) Werner Schmied	Rotax				DNQ							0
	(Austria) Hans Pristavnik	MBA				DNQ							0
	(Belgium) Chris Baert	MBA						DNQ					0
	(Belgium) Alain Trippaers	MBA						DNQ					0
	(Belgium) Luc Beugnier	Honda						DNQ					0
	(Belgium) Jean-Claude Collard	MBA						DNQ					0
	(France) Claude Vial	AVM							DNQ				0
	(France) Philippe Jault	MBA							DNQ				0
	(France) Jacky Rubat	AVM							DNQ				0
	(United Kingdom) Shaun Simpson	MBA								DNQ			0
	(United Kingdom) Tim Bradley	MBA								DNQ			0
	(Sweden) Petri Vourela	MBA									DNQ		0
	(Sweden) Bengt Eliasson	MBA									DNQ		0
	(Finland) Matti Kinnunen	MBA									DNQ		0
	(Sweden) Stefan Sand	MBA									DNQ		0
	(Sweden) Bo Blumenthal	MBA									DNQ		0
	(Chile) Vincenzo Cascino	MBA										DNQ	0

=== 80cc standings ===
Place	Rider	Machine	ESP (Spain)	GER (Germany)	NAT (Italy)	YUG (Socialist Federal Republic of Yugoslavia)	NED (Netherlands)	FRA (France)	RSM (San Marino)	Points
1	(Switzerland) Stefan Dörflinger	Krauser	2	1	3	1	2	2	3	86
2	(Spain) Jorge Martínez	Derbi	1	Ret	1	2	3	Ret	1	67
3	(Austria) Gerd Kafka	Seel	4	3	Ret	5	1	8	5	48
4	(Spain) Manuel Herreros	Derbi	3	DNS	2	3	4	Ret	6	45
5	(West Germany) Gerhard Waibel	Seel	6	2	Ret	4	10	5	8	35
6	(United Kingdom) Ian McConnachie	Huvo-Casal	Ret	4	4	8	Ret	9	2	33
7	(Netherlands) Theo Timmer	Huvo-Casal	5	8	Ret	7	6	10	9	21
8	(Netherlands) Henk van Kessel	Huvo-Casal	Ret	Ret	Ret	9	5	3	Ret	18
9	(Spain) Angel Nieto	Derbi					Ret	1	Ret	15
10	(Netherlands) Paul Rimmelzwaan	Harmsen	7	11	5	10	Ret	7	Ret	15
11	(France) Jean-Marc Velay	Casal	9	13	7	22	18	4		14
12	(Netherlands) Hans Spaan	Huvo-Casal	Ret	6	DNS				4	13
13	(Spain) Joan Bolart	Autisa	DNS	Ret	6	Ret	8	Ret	10	9
14	(Germany) Stefan Prein	Huvo-Casal		5			15			6
15	(Belgium) Serge Julin	Casal	14	9	11	19	7	11	16	6
16	(Spain) Domingo Gil	Autisa	18	Ret	Ret	13	16	6		5
17	(Germany) Rudolf Kunz	Ziegler		Ret		6	11	Ret	Ret	4
18	(Italy) Vincenzo Sblendorio	Huvo-Casal			12				7	4
19	(Germany) Richard Bay	Maico	8	10	20	DNF		18	12	4
20	(Germany) Reinhard Koberstein	Seel	Ret	7	Ret	20	23	15		4
21	(Italy) Giuliano Tabanelli	BBFT		17	8	16			Ret	3
22	(Netherlands) Cees Besseling	CJB					9	16	15	2
23	(United Kingdom) Jamie Lodge	Krauser	Ret	DNS	9	14	DNQ	DNQ	Ret	2
24	(Germany) Günter Schirnhofer	Krauser	Ret	16	10	12	13	13		1
25	(Germany) Bernd Rossbach	Huvo-Casal	10	12	17	DNF	21		DNQ	1
	(Italy) Salvatore Milano	Casal	11	19	13	17			DNS	0
	(Spain) Joaquim Gali	Derbi	Ret	Ret	18	11				0
	(Spain) Herri Torrontegui	JJ Cobas	DNS	DNQ	22	23	20	19	11	0
	(Netherlands) Jos van Dongen	Casal		14			17	12		0
	(Germany) Michael Gschwander	Casal	12	Ret						0
	(Netherlands) Wilco Zeelenberg	Huvo-Casal					12			0
	(Netherlands) Bertus Grinwis	Bultaco	13	18	DNQ					0
	(Socialist Federal Republic of Yugoslavia) Zdravko Matulja	Ziegler		26		21	22		13	0
	(Germany) Johan Auer	Eberhardt		20	15	30	19	21	14	0
	(Switzerland) Rene Dunki	Zundapp	Ret	Ret		27	Ret	14	Ret	0
	(United Kingdom) Steve Mason	MBA	Ret	DNQ	14		Ret		Ret	0
	(Netherlands) Henri van Heist	Casal					14			0
	(Switzerland) Reiner Koster	LCR	15	21	DNQ	25	DNQ	Ret	Ret	0
	(Netherlands) Hans Koopman	Ziegler	Ret	15	24	24	Ret	Ret		0
	(Socialist Federal Republic of Yugoslavia) Janos Pintar	Eberhardt				15				0
	(Germany) Thomas Engl	Esch	16	23	21	26	25	25		0
	(Italy) Nicola Casadei	Casal			16					0
	(Belgium) Chris Baert	Eberhardt	17	22	Ret	Ret	26	20	18	0
	(Italy) Massimo Fargeri	RB			19				17	0
	(France) Lionel Robert	Scrab						17		0
	(Italy) Mario Stocco	Unimoto			Ret	18				0
	(Austria) Otto Machinek	Hummel		Ret	DNQ	20	Ret		19	0
	(Finland) Mika-Sakari Komu	Eberhardt		DNQ	DNQ	Ret	24	22	20	0
	(Italy) Pasquale Buonfante	Garelli			23				Ret	0
	(France) Jean-Luc Facon	Huvo-Casal						23		0
	(Germany) Gunter Maussner	Casal	Ret	24						0
	(Spain) Jose Baez	Casal	DNS					24		0
	(Netherlands) Bert Smit	BZ		25			Ret			0
	(Finland) Raimo Lipponen	Imatra Sp.		27			DNQ			0
	(Netherlands) Aad Wijsman	Harmsen		Ret			28	Ret		0
	(Socialist Federal Republic of Yugoslavia) Miroslav Lesicki	Severin				29				0
	(Socialist Federal Republic of Yugoslavia) Alois Pavlic	Seel		Ret	Ret	Ret				0
	(Italy) Paolo Priori	Lusuardi			DNS		Ret	Ret	DNS	0
	(Spain) Ramon Gali	Bultaco	Ret	DNQ	Ret					0
	(Germany) Stefan Kurfiss	Siku		Ret						0
	(Italy) Bruno Casanova	Lusuardi			Ret					0
	(France) Paul Bordes	Scrab						Ret		0
	(Spain) Daniel Mateos	Autisa						Ret		0
	(France) Thierry Hemery	Huvo-Casal						Ret		0
	(United Kingdom) Edward Rees	Ziegler						DNQ	Ret	0
	(Spain) Manuel Daniel	Autisa							Ret	0
	(Spain) Julián Miralles	Derbi	DNS							0
	(Finland) Jarmo Piepponen	Huvo-Casal		DNQ			DNQ			0
	(France) Jean-Francois Verdier	Derbi	DNQ					DNQ		0
	(Germany) Kasimar Rapczynski	Eigenbouw		DNQ						0
	(United Kingdom) Steve Lawton	Yamoto		DNQ						0
	(Germany) Rudi Brecht	Ziegler		DNQ						0
	(Germany) Willi Haas	Honda		DNQ						0
	(Germany) Carlo Sieben	EB		DNQ						0
	(United Kingdom) John Cresswell	Lusuardi		DNQ						0
	(Italy) Claudio Granata	Lusuardi			DNQ					0
	(France) Patrick Robert	Huvo						DNQ		0
	(France) Philippe Linares	Kawasaki						DNQ		0
	(France) Henri Laporte	Moto						DNQ		0
	(France) Francois Didier	Scrab						DNQ		0
	(France) Fabrice Roy	Tyl						DNQ		0
