= 1985 Spanish motorcycle Grand Prix =

(Spain) 1985 Spanish Grand Prix
Race details
- Race 2 of 12 races in the 1985 Grand Prix motorcycle racing season
- Date: 5 May 1985
- Official name: Gran Premio de España
- Location: Circuito Permanente del Jarama
- Course: Permanent racing facility; 3.404 km (2.115 mi)

500cc
Pole position
- Rider: (United States) Eddie Lawson
- Time: 1:28.600
Fastest lap
- Rider: (United States) Freddie Spencer
- Time: 1:28.990
Podium
- First: (United States) Freddie Spencer
- Second: (United States) Eddie Lawson
- Third: (France) Christian Sarron

250cc
Pole position
- Rider: (United States) Freddie Spencer
- Time: 1:30.620
Fastest lap
- Rider: (United States) Freddie Spencer
- Time: 1:32.050
Podium
- First: (Venezuela) Carlos Lavado
- Second: (West Germany) Martin Wimmer
- Third: (West Germany) Anton Mang

125cc
Pole position
- Rider: (Italy) Luca Cadalora
- Time: 1:36.070
Fastest lap
- Rider: (Italy) Pier Paolo Bianchi
- Time: 1:35.550
Podium
- First: (Italy) Pier Paolo Bianchi
- Second: (Italy) Fausto Gresini
- Third: (Italy) Domenico Brigaglia

80cc
Pole position
- Rider: (Switzerland) Stefan Dörflinger
Fastest lap
- Rider: (Spain) Jorge Martínez
Podium
- First: (Spain) Jorge Martínez
- Second: (Switzerland) Stefan Dörflinger
- Third: (Spain) Manuel Herreros

The 1985 Spanish motorcycle Grand Prix was the second round of the 1985 Grand Prix motorcycle racing season. It took place on the weekend of 4–5 May 1985 at the Circuito Permanente del Jarama.

== Classification ==
=== 500 cc ===
Pos.	Rider	Team	Manufacturer	Time/Retired	Points
1	(United States) Freddie Spencer	Rothmans Team HRC	Honda	56'04.780	15
2	(United States) Eddie Lawson	Marlboro Team Agostini	Yamaha	+13.310	12
3	(France) Christian Sarron	Sonauto Gauloises Yamaha	Yamaha	+28.580	10
4	(Australia) Wayne Gardner	Rothmans Honda Britain	Honda	+29.580	8
5	(France) Raymond Roche	Marlboro Team Agostini	Yamaha	+1'11.950	6
6	(Belgium) Didier de Radiguès	Honda Benelux Elf	Honda	+1'16.980	5
7	(United States) Mike Baldwin		Honda	+1'18.420	4
8	(United Kingdom) Ron Haslam	Rothmans Honda Britain	Honda	+1'25.900	3
9	(Spain) Sito Pons	HB Suzuki GP Team	Suzuki	+1 lap	2
10	(Italy) Fabio Biliotti	Team Italia	Honda	+1 lap	1
11	(Netherlands) Henk van der Mark	Stichting Netherlands Racing Team	Honda	+1 lap	
12	(West Germany) Klaus Klein		Suzuki	+1 lap	
13	(Switzerland) Wolfgang Von Muralt	Frankonia-Suzuki	Suzuki	+1 lap	
14	(France) Louis-Luc Maisto		Honda	+1 lap	
15	(Finland) Eero Hyvärinen		Honda	+2 laps	
16	(Spain) Andres Perez Rubio		Suzuki	+2 laps	
17	(United Kingdom) Simon Buckmaster	Sid Griffiths Racing	Suzuki	+2 laps	
18	(Spain) Carlos Morante		Suzuki	+3 laps	
Ret	(Netherlands) Mile Pajic	Stichting Netherlands Racing Team	Honda	Retired	
Ret	(France) Christian Le Liard	Team ROC	Honda	Retired	
Ret	(Italy) Massimo Broccoli		Suzuki	Retired	
Ret	(Italy) Alessandro Valesi		Honda	Accident	
Ret	(Sweden) Peter Sköld		Bakker-Honda	Retired	
Ret	(United Kingdom) Rob McElnea	Skoal Bandit Heron Suzuki	Suzuki	Accident	
Ret	(Zimbabwe) Dave Petersen	Kreepy Krauly Racing	Honda	Accident	
Ret	(Netherlands) Boet van Dulmen	Shell-Toshiba Racing Team	Honda	Retired	
Ret	(Japan) Takazumi Katayama	Rothmans Honda Team	Honda	Accident	
Ret	(United Kingdom) Neil Robinson	Jim Finlay Racing	Suzuki	Retired	
Ret	(United States) Randy Mamola	Rothmans Honda Mamola	Honda	Retired	
Ret	(Austria) Dietmar Mayer		Honda	Retired	
Ret	(Italy) Armando Errico	Team Italia	Honda	Retired	
Ret	(Sweden) Peter Linden		Honda	Retired	
Ret	(Spain) Antonio Boronat		Suzuki	Retired	
DNS	(Italy) Massimo Messere	Team Italia	Honda	Did not start	
DNS	(Italy) Franco Uncini	HB Suzuki GP Team	Suzuki	Did not start	
DNS	(France) Thierry Espié		Chevallier	Did not start	
DNS	(United Kingdom) Keith Huewen		Honda	Did not start	
DNQ	(Brazil) Marco Greco		Honda	Did not qualify	
DNQ	(United Kingdom) Gary Lingham		Suzuki	Did not qualify	
DNQ	(Luxembourg) Andreas Leuthe		Honda	Did not qualify	

Previous race: 1985 South African Grand Prix	FIM Grand Prix World Championship; 1985 season	Next race: 1985 German Grand Prix
Previous race: 1984 Spanish Grand Prix	Spanish Grand Prix	Next race: 1986 Spanish Grand Prix
