= 1985 Belgian motorcycle Grand Prix =

(Belgium) 1985 Belgian Grand Prix
Race details
- Race 8 of 12 races in the 1985 Grand Prix motorcycle racing season
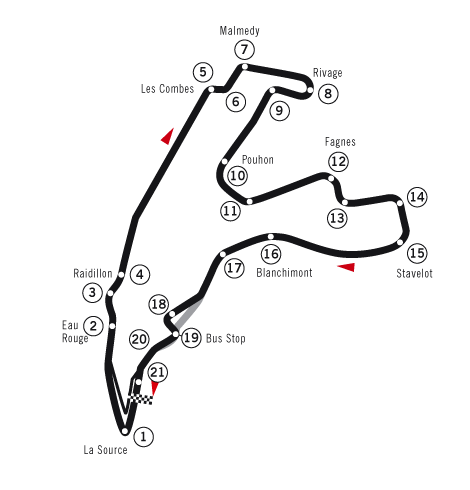
- Date: 7 July 1985
- Official name: Johnson GP of Belgium
- Location: Circuit de Spa-Francorchamps
- Course: Permanent racing facility; 6.940 km (4.312 mi)

500cc
Pole position
- Rider: (United States) Freddie Spencer
- Time: 2:28.570
Fastest lap
- Rider: Unknown
Podium
- First: (United States) Freddie Spencer
- Second: (United States) Eddie Lawson
- Third: (France) Christian Sarron

250cc
Pole position
- Rider: Unknown
Fastest lap
- Rider: Unknown
Podium
- First: (United States) Freddie Spencer
- Second: (Venezuela) Carlos Lavado
- Third: (West Germany) Anton Mang

125cc
Pole position
- Rider: Unknown
Fastest lap
- Rider: Unknown
Podium
- First: (Italy) Fausto Gresini
- Second: (Switzerland) Bruno Kneubühler
- Third: (Belgium) Lucio Pietroniro

80cc
Pole position
- Rider: No 80cc was held
Fastest lap
- Rider: No 80cc was held
Podium
- First: No 80cc was held
- Second: No 80cc was held
- Third: No 80cc was held

The 1985 Belgian motorcycle Grand Prix was the eighth round of the 1985 Grand Prix motorcycle racing season. It took place on the weekend of 5–7 July 1985 at the Circuit de Spa-Francorchamps.

== Classification ==
=== 500 cc ===
Pos.	Rider	Team	Manufacturer	Time/Retired	Points
1	(United States) Freddie Spencer	Rothmans Team HRC	Honda	49'51.800	15
2	(United States) Eddie Lawson	Marlboro Team Agostini	Yamaha	+5.270	12
3	(France) Christian Sarron	Sonauto Gauloises Yamaha	Yamaha	+36.290	10
4	(Australia) Wayne Gardner	Rothmans Honda Britain	Honda	+50.510	8
5	(France) Raymond Roche	Marlboro Team Agostini	Yamaha	+1'14.370	6
6	(United Kingdom) Ron Haslam	Rothmans Honda Britain	Honda	+1'25.950	5
7	(Belgium) Didier de Radiguès	Honda Benelux Elf	Honda	+1'36.080	4
8	(Japan) Takazumi Katayama	Rothmans Honda Team	Honda	+1'38.340	3
9	(Netherlands) Boet van Dulmen	Shell-Toshiba Racing Team	Honda	+1'59.560	2
10	(West Germany) Gustav Reiner	Zwafink & Wilberts Racing	Honda	+2'00.660	1
11	(United States) Mike Baldwin		Honda	+2'15.310	
12	(France) Thierry Espié		Chevallier	+2'17.010	
13	(Italy) Franco Uncini	HB Suzuki GP Team	Suzuki	+2'18.420	
14	(France) Christian Le Liard	Team ROC	Honda	+2'29.700	
15	(Spain) Sito Pons	HB Suzuki GP Team	Suzuki	+2'33.360	
16	(Italy) Massimo Messere	Team Italia	Honda	+1 lap	
17	(Italy) Armando Errico	Team Italia	Honda	+1 lap	
18	(Netherlands) Henk van der Mark	Stichting Netherlands Racing Team	Honda	+1 lap	
19	(Finland) Eero Hyvärinen		Honda	+1 lap	
20	(Netherlands) Rob Punt	Oud Bier	Suzuki	+1 lap	
21	(Netherlands) Mile Pajic	Stichting Netherlands Racing Team	Honda	+1 lap	
22	(West Germany) Manfred Fischer		Honda	+1 lap	
23	(United Kingdom) Paul Iddon		Suzuki	+1 lap	
24	(United Kingdom) Neil Robinson	Jim Finlay Racing	Suzuki	+1 lap	
25	(Italy) Marco Papa		Suzuki	+1 lap	
26	(Austria) Dietmar Mayer		Honda	+1 lap	
27	(Netherlands) Maarten Duyzers		Suzuki	+1 lap	
28	(West Germany) Georg Jung		Suzuki	+1 lap	
Ret	(Zimbabwe) Dave Petersen	Kreepy Krauly Racing	Honda	Retired	
Ret	(United States) Randy Mamola	Rothmans Honda Mamola	Honda	Accident	
Ret	(Italy) Marco Lucchinelli		Cagiva	Retired	
Ret	(Italy) Fabio Biliotti	Team Italia	Honda	Retired	
Ret	(Switzerland) Wolfgang Von Muralt	Frankonia-Suzuki	Suzuki	Retired	
Ret	(United Kingdom) Rob McElnea	Skoal Bandit Heron Suzuki	Suzuki	Retired	

Previous race: 1985 Dutch TT	FIM Grand Prix World Championship; 1985 season	Next race: 1985 French Grand Prix
Previous race: 1984 Belgian Grand Prix	Belgian Grand Prix	Next race: 1986 Belgian Grand Prix
