= 1985 Yugoslavian motorcycle Grand Prix =

(Socialist Federal Republic of Yugoslavia) 1985 Yugoslavian Grand Prix
Race details
- Race 6 of 12 races in the 1985 Grand Prix motorcycle racing season
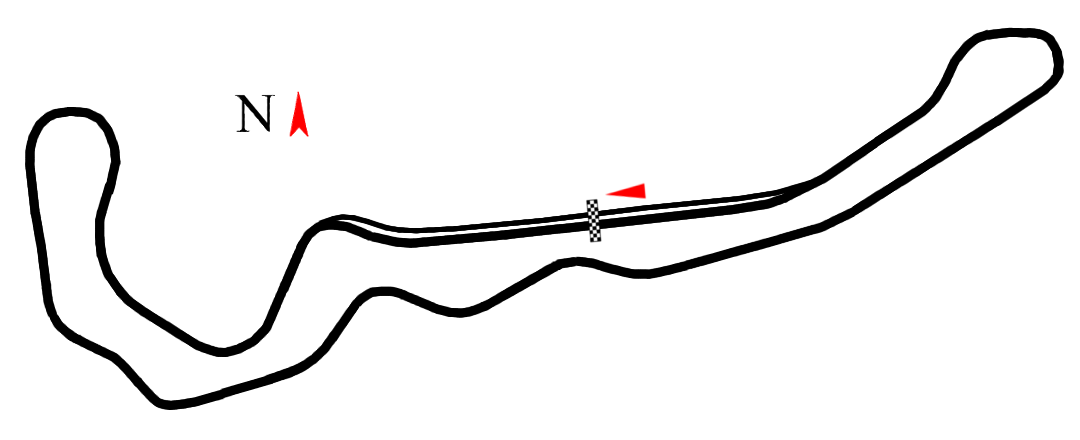
- Date: 16 June 1985
- Official name: Yu Grand Prix
- Location: Automotodrom Rijeka
- Course: Permanent racing facility; 4.168 km (2.590 mi)

500cc
Pole position
- Rider: (United States) Freddie Spencer
- Time: 1:31.440
Fastest lap
- Rider: Unknown
Podium
- First: (United States) Eddie Lawson
- Second: (United States) Freddie Spencer
- Third: (Australia) Wayne Gardner

250cc
Pole position
- Rider: Unknown
Fastest lap
- Rider: Unknown
Podium
- First: (United States) Freddie Spencer
- Second: (Venezuela) Carlos Lavado
- Third: (Italy) Loris Reggiani

125cc
Pole position
- Rider: No 125cc was held
Fastest lap
- Rider: No 125cc was held
Podium
- First: No 125cc was held
- Second: No 125cc was held
- Third: No 125cc was held

80cc
Pole position
- Rider: Unknown
Fastest lap
- Rider: Unknown
Podium
- First: (Switzerland) Stefan Dörflinger
- Second: (Spain) Jorge Martínez
- Third: (Spain) Manuel Herreros

The 1985 Yugoslavian motorcycle Grand Prix was the sixth round of the 1985 Grand Prix motorcycle racing season. It took place on the weekend of 14–16 June 1985 at the Automotodrom Rijeka.

== Classification ==
=== 500 cc ===
Pos.	Rider	Team	Manufacturer	Time/Retired	Points
1	(United States) Eddie Lawson	Marlboro Team Agostini	Yamaha	49'46.650	15
2	(United States) Freddie Spencer	Rothmans Team HRC	Honda	+21.760	12
3	(Australia) Wayne Gardner	Rothmans Honda Britain	Honda	+30.240	10
4	(United Kingdom) Ron Haslam	Rothmans Honda Britain	Honda	+37.950	8
5	(France) Christian Sarron	Sonauto Gauloises Yamaha	Yamaha	+1'10.770	6
6	(France) Raymond Roche	Marlboro Team Agostini	Yamaha	+1'11.120	5
7	(Belgium) Didier de Radiguès	Honda Benelux Elf	Honda	+1'24.840	4
8	(United Kingdom) Rob McElnea	Skoal Bandit Heron Suzuki	Suzuki	+1'25.310	3
9	(West Germany) Gustav Reiner	Zwafink & Wilberts Racing	Honda	+1'25.610	2
10	(Zimbabwe) Dave Petersen	Kreepy Krauly Racing	Honda	+1'25.890	1
11	(Spain) Sito Pons	HB Suzuki GP Team	Suzuki	+1 lap	
12	(Italy) Fabio Biliotti	Team Italia	Honda	+1 lap	
13	(Finland) Eero Hyvärinen		Honda	+1 lap	
14	(Netherlands) Boet van Dulmen	Shell-Toshiba Racing Team	Honda	+1 lap	
15	(Italy) Marco Lucchinelli		Cagiva	+1 lap	
16	(Switzerland) Wolfgang Von Muralt	Frankonia-Suzuki	Suzuki	+1 lap	
17	(France) Christian Le Liard	Team ROC	Honda	+1 lap	
18	(Italy) Armando Errico	Team Italia	Honda	+1 lap	
19	(Italy) Marco Papa		Suzuki	+1 lap	
20	(Austria) Dietmar Mayer		Honda	+2 laps	
21	(Italy) Massimo Broccoli		Suzuki	+2 laps	
22	(Italy) Massimo Messere	Team Italia	Honda	+2 laps	
23	(Austria) Josef Ragginger		Suzuki	+3 laps	
24	(Luxembourg) Andreas Leuthe		Honda	+3 laps	
25	(Greece) Dimitris Papandreou		Yamaha	+3 laps	
26	(Austria) Josef Doppler		Honda	+3 laps	
27	(Italy) Leandro Becheroni		Suzuki	+3 laps	
Ret	(United States) Randy Mamola	Rothmans Honda Mamola	Honda	Accident	
Ret	(Italy) Franco Uncini	HB Suzuki GP Team	Suzuki	Retired	
Ret	(France) Louis-Luc Maisto		Honda	Retired	
Ret	(France) Thierry Espié		Chevallier	Retired	
Ret	(Japan) Takazumi Katayama	Rothmans Honda Team	Honda	Retired	
Ret	(Czechoslovakia) Bohumil Staša		Honda	Retired	
Ret	(Czechoslovakia) Pavol Dekánek		Suzuki	Retired	
DNS	(Austria) Karl Truchsess		Honda	Did not start	
DNS	(Italy) Alessandro Valesi		Honda	Did not start	

Previous race: 1985 Austrian Grand Prix	FIM Grand Prix World Championship; 1985 season	Next race: 1985 Dutch TT
Previous race: 1984 Yugoslavian Grand Prix	Yugoslavian Grand Prix	Next race: 1986 Yugoslavian Grand Prix
