= 1985 Dutch TT =

(Netherlands) 1985 Dutch TT
Race details
- Race 7 of 12 races in the 1985 Grand Prix motorcycle racing season
- Date: 29 June 1985
- Official name: Dutch TT Assen
- Location: TT Circuit Assen
- Course: Permanent racing facility; 6.049 km (3.759 mi)

500cc
Pole position
- Rider: (United States) Freddie Spencer
- Time: 2:13.910
Fastest lap
- Rider: Unknown
Podium
- First: (United States) Randy Mamola
- Second: (United Kingdom) Ron Haslam
- Third: (Australia) Wayne Gardner

250cc
Pole position
- Rider: Unknown
Fastest lap
- Rider: Unknown
Podium
- First: (United States) Freddie Spencer
- Second: (West Germany) Martin Wimmer
- Third: (West Germany) Anton Mang

125cc
Pole position
- Rider: Unknown
Fastest lap
- Rider: Unknown
Podium
- First: (Italy) Pier Paolo Bianchi
- Second: (Italy) Ezio Gianola
- Third: (Italy) Fausto Gresini

80cc
Pole position
- Rider: Unknown
Fastest lap
- Rider: Unknown
Podium
- First: (Austria) Gert Kafka
- Second: (Switzerland) Stefan Dörflinger
- Third: (Spain) Jorge Martínez

The 1985 Dutch TT was the seventh round of the 1985 Grand Prix motorcycle racing season. It took place on the weekend of 27–29 June 1985 at the TT Circuit Assen located in Assen, Netherlands.

== Classification ==
=== 500 cc ===
Pos.	Rider	Team	Manufacturer	Time/Retired	Points
1	(United States) Randy Mamola	Rothmans Honda Mamola	Honda	50'47.220	15
2	(United Kingdom) Ron Haslam	Rothmans Honda Britain	Honda	+35.760	12
3	(Australia) Wayne Gardner	Rothmans Honda Britain	Honda	+35.760	10
4	(Netherlands) Boet van Dulmen	Shell-Toshiba Racing Team	Honda	+49.410	8
5	(France) Pierre-Etienne Samin	Honda Benelux Elf	Honda	+55.110	6
6	(Belgium) Didier de Radiguès	Honda Benelux Elf	Honda	+1'26.710	5
7	(United Kingdom) Rob McElnea	Skoal Bandit Heron Suzuki	Suzuki	+2'19.720	4
8	(Netherlands) Mile Pajic	Stichting Netherlands Racing Team	Honda	+1 lap	3
9	(Netherlands) Henk van der Mark	Stichting Netherlands Racing Team	Honda	+1 lap	2
10	(Netherlands) Rob Punt	Oud Bier	Suzuki	+1 lap	1
11	(Italy) Massimo Messere	Team Italia	Honda	+1 lap	
12	(Italy) Fabio Biliotti	Team Italia	Honda	+1 lap	
13	(Italy) Franco Uncini	HB Suzuki GP Team	Suzuki	+1 lap	
14	(West Germany) Manfred Fischer		Honda	+1 lap	
15	(Italy) Armando Errico	Team Italia	Honda	+1 lap	
16	(United Kingdom) Ray Swann		Suzuki	+1 lap	
17	(United Kingdom) Paul Iddon		Suzuki	+3 laps	
18	(Italy) Marco Papa		Suzuki	+3 laps	
19	(Netherlands) Maarten Duyzers		Suzuki	+3 laps	
Ret	(Italy) Marco Lucchinelli		Cagiva	Retired	
Ret	(United States) Eddie Lawson	Marlboro Team Agostini	Yamaha	Accident	
Ret	(Finland) Eero Hyvärinen		Honda	Accident	
Ret	(United States) Mike Baldwin		Honda	Accident	
Ret	(France) Christian Le Liard	Team ROC	Honda	Accident	
Ret	(France) Raymond Roche	Marlboro Team Agostini	Yamaha	Retired	
Ret	(Austria) Karl Truchsess		Honda	Accident	
Ret	(United Kingdom) Mark Salle		Suzuki	Retired	
Ret	(France) Thierry Espié		Chevallier	Retired	
Ret	(Zimbabwe) Dave Petersen	Kreepy Krauly Racing	Honda	Retired	
Ret	(West Germany) Gustav Reiner	Zwafink & Wilberts Racing	Honda	Retired	
Ret	(Japan) Takazumi Katayama	Rothmans Honda Team	Honda	Retired	
Ret	(France) Christian Sarron	Sonauto Gauloises Yamaha	Yamaha	Accident	
Ret	(United Kingdom) Steve Parrish		Yamaha	Retired	
Ret	(United States) Freddie Spencer	Rothmans Team HRC	Honda	Accident	
Ret	(Switzerland) Wolfgang Von Muralt	Frankonia-Suzuki	Suzuki	Accident	
Ret	(Spain) Sito Pons	HB Suzuki GP Team	Suzuki	Accident	
DNQ	(Austria) Dietmar Mayer		Honda	Did not qualify	
DNQ	(United Kingdom) Simon Buckmaster	Sid Griffiths Racing	Suzuki	Did not qualify	
DNQ	(Netherlands) Peter Lemstra		Suzuki	Did not qualify	
DNQ	(United Kingdom) David Griffith		Suzuki	Did not qualify	

Previous race: 1985 Yugoslavian Grand Prix	FIM Grand Prix World Championship; 1985 season	Next race: 1985 Belgian Grand Prix
Previous race: 1984 Dutch TT	Dutch TT	Next race: 1986 Dutch TT
