= 1985 German motorcycle Grand Prix =

(West Germany) 1985 German Grand Prix
Race details
- Race 3 of 12 races in the 1985 Grand Prix motorcycle racing season
- Date: 19 May 1985
- Official name: Großer Preis von Deutschland
- Location: Hockenheimring
- Course: Permanent racing facility; 6.789 km (4.218 mi)

500cc
Pole position
- Rider: (United States) Freddie Spencer
- Time: 2:05.350
Fastest lap
- Rider: Unknown
Podium
- First: (France) Christian Sarron
- Second: (United States) Freddie Spencer
- Third: (United Kingdom) Ron Haslam

250cc
Pole position
- Rider: (United States) Freddie Spencer
- Time: 2:15.660
Fastest lap
- Rider: Unknown
Podium
- First: (West Germany) Martin Wimmer
- Second: (United States) Freddie Spencer
- Third: (West Germany) Anton Mang

125cc
Pole position
- Rider: (Italy) Pier Paolo Bianchi
- Time: 2:24.980
Fastest lap
- Rider: Unknown
Podium
- First: (Austria) August Auinger
- Second: (Italy) Fausto Gresini
- Third: (Italy) Pier Paolo Bianchi

80cc
Pole position
- Rider: (Switzerland) Stefan Dörflinger
- Time: 2:32.610
Fastest lap
- Rider: Unknown
Podium
- First: (Switzerland) Stefan Dörflinger
- Second: (Spain) Jorge Martínez
- Third: (Netherlands) Hans Spaan

The 1985 German motorcycle Grand Prix was the third round of the 1985 Grand Prix motorcycle racing season. It took place on the weekend of 17–19 May 1985 at the Hockenheimring.

== Classification ==
=== 500 cc ===
Pos.	Rider	Team	Manufacturer	Time/Retired	Points
1	(France) Christian Sarron	Sonauto Gauloises Yamaha	Yamaha	45'05.240	15
2	(United States) Freddie Spencer	Rothmans Team HRC	Honda	+11.590	12
3	(United Kingdom) Ron Haslam	Rothmans Honda Britain	Honda	+15.350	10
4	(United States) Eddie Lawson	Marlboro Team Agostini	Yamaha	+40.100	8
5	(Belgium) Didier de Radiguès	Honda Benelux Elf	Honda	+58.580	6
6	(Australia) Wayne Gardner	Rothmans Honda Britain	Honda	+59.490	5
7	(United Kingdom) Rob McElnea	Skoal Bandit Heron Suzuki	Suzuki	+1'13.050	4
8	(United States) Randy Mamola	Rothmans Honda Mamola	Honda	+1'24.660	3
9	(Spain) Sito Pons	HB Suzuki GP Team	Suzuki	+1'29.220	2
10	(Netherlands) Boet van Dulmen	Shell-Toshiba Racing Team	Honda	+1'35.330	1
11	(Japan) Takazumi Katayama	Rothmans Honda Team	Honda	+1'52.910	
12	(United Kingdom) Neil Robinson	Jim Finlay Racing	Suzuki	+1 lap	
13	(France) Raymond Roche	Marlboro Team Agostini	Yamaha	+1 lap	
14	(Switzerland) Marco Gentile		Yamaha	+1 lap	
15	(West Germany) Klaus Klein		Suzuki	+1 lap	
16	(Finland) Eero Hyvärinen		Honda	+1 lap	
17	(West Germany) Manfred Fischer		Honda	+1 lap	
18	(West Germany) Georg Jung		Suzuki	+1 lap	
19	(United Kingdom) Paul Iddon		Suzuki	+1 lap	
20	(West Germany) Rainer Sautter		Suzuki	+1 lap	
21	(Sweden) Peter Sköld		Bakker-Honda	+1 lap	
22	(West Germany) Andreas Woditsch		Yamaha	+1 lap	
23	(Netherlands) Maarten Duyzers		Suzuki	+1 lap	
24	(Austria) Josef Ragginger		Suzuki	+1 lap	
25	(Italy) Fabio Biliotti	Team Italia	Honda	+1 lap	
26	(Italy) Marco Papa		Suzuki	+1 lap	
27	(Sweden) Peter Linden		Honda	+1 lap	
28	(Italy) Armando Errico	Team Italia	Honda	+1 lap	
29	(Czechoslovakia) Bohumil Staša		Honda	+2 laps	
30	(United Kingdom) Keith Huewen		Honda	+2 laps	
Ret	(Zimbabwe) Dave Petersen	Kreepy Krauly Racing	Honda	Retired	
Ret	(United Kingdom) Gary Lingham		Suzuki	Retired	
Ret	(United Kingdom) Mark Salle		Suzuki	Retired	
Ret	(United Kingdom) Simon Buckmaster	Sid Griffiths Racing	Suzuki	Retired	
Ret	(Italy) Franco Uncini	HB Suzuki GP Team	Suzuki	Retired	
Ret	(Switzerland) Wolfgang Von Muralt	Frankonia-Suzuki	Suzuki	Retired	
Ret	(West Germany) Gerold Fischer		Suzuki	Retired	
Ret	(Austria) Karl Truchsess		Honda	Retired	
Ret	(France) Christian Le Liard	Team ROC	Honda	Retired	
Ret	(Italy) Paolo Ferreti		Honda	Retired	
Ret	(United States) Mike Baldwin		Honda	Retired	
DNS	(Italy) Massimo Messere	Team Italia	Honda	Did not start	
DNQ	(Luxembourg) Andreas Leuthe		Honda	Did not qualify	
DNQ	(West Germany) Helmut Schütz		Suzuki	Did not qualify	
DNQ	(Austria) Josef Doppler		Honda	Did not qualify	
DNQ	(Netherlands) Harrie Heutmekers		Suzuki	Did not qualify	
DNQ	(West Germany) Lothar Spiegler		Suzuki	Did not qualify	

Previous race: 1985 Spanish Grand Prix	FIM Grand Prix World Championship; 1985 season	Next race: 1985 Nations Grand Prix
Previous race: 1984 German Grand Prix	German Grand Prix	Next race: 1986 German Grand Prix
