= 1985 San Marino motorcycle Grand Prix =

1985 Motorcycle race

1985 San Marino Grand Prix
Race details
- Race 12 of 12 races in the 1985 Grand Prix motorcycle racing season
- Date: 1 September 1985
- Official name: Grand Prix San Marino
- Location: Circuito Internazionale Santa Monica
- Course: Permanent racing facility; 3.488 km (2.167 mi)

500cc
Pole position
- Rider: (United States) Eddie Lawson
- Time: 1:19.630
Fastest lap
- Rider: (United States) Eddie Lawson
- Time: 1:20.460
Podium
- First: (United States) Eddie Lawson
- Second: (Australia) Wayne Gardner
- Third: (United States) Randy Mamola

250cc
Pole position
- Rider: (Venezuela) Carlos Lavado
- Time: 1:22.550
Fastest lap
- Rider: (Venezuela) Carlos Lavado
- Time: 1:22.460
Podium
- First: (Venezuela) Carlos Lavado
- Second: (West Germany) Anton Mang
- Third: (Italy) Loris Reggiani

125cc
Pole position
- Rider: (Italy) Fausto Gresini
- Time: 1:25.780
Fastest lap
- Rider: (Switzerland) Bruno Kneubühler
- Time: 1:25.140
Podium
- First: (Italy) Fausto Gresini
- Second: (Italy) Ezio Gianola
- Third: (Italy) Maurizio Vitali

80cc
Pole position
- Rider: (Spain) Jorge Martínez
Fastest lap
- Rider: (United Kingdom) Ian McConnachie
Podium
- First: (Spain) Jorge Martínez
- Second: (United Kingdom) Ian McConnachie
- Third: (Switzerland) Stefan Dörflinger

The 1985 San Marino motorcycle Grand Prix was the final race of the 1985 Grand Prix motorcycle racing season. It took place on 30 August–1 September 1985 at the Circuito Internazionale Santa Monica.

This was the last race of former world champion Franco Uncini.

== Classification ==
=== 500 cc ===
Pos.	Rider	Team	Manufacturer	Time/Retired	Points
1	(United States) Eddie Lawson	Marlboro Team Agostini	Yamaha	47'34.440	15
2	(Australia) Wayne Gardner	Rothmans Honda Britain	Honda	+17.520	12
3	(United States) Randy Mamola	Rothmans Honda Mamola	Honda	+21.610	10
4	(France) Raymond Roche	Marlboro Team Agostini	Yamaha	+28.090	8
5	(United Kingdom) Ron Haslam	Rothmans Honda Britain	Honda	+1'03.350	6
6	(Italy) Franco Uncini	HB Suzuki GP Team	Suzuki	+1'18.270	5
7	(West Germany) Gustav Reiner	Zwafink & Wilberts Racing	Honda	+1'19.140	4
8	(United States) Mike Baldwin		Honda	+1'20.220	3
9	(Italy) Fabio Biliotti	Team Italia	Honda	+1 lap	2
10	(United Kingdom) Rob McElnea	Skoal Bandit Heron Suzuki	Suzuki	+1 lap	1
11	(Spain) Sito Pons	HB Suzuki GP Team	Suzuki	+1 lap	
12	(Italy) Massimo Messere	Team Italia	Honda	+1 lap	
13	(Switzerland) Wolfgang Von Muralt	Frankonia-Suzuki	Suzuki	+1 lap	
14	(Zimbabwe) Dave Petersen	Kreepy Krauly Racing	Honda	+1 lap	
15	(Australia) Paul Lewis	Skoal Bandit Heron Suzuki	Suzuki	+1 lap	
16	(Italy) Leandro Beccheroni		Suzuki	+1 lap	
17	(Netherlands) Boet van Dulmen	Shell-Toshiba Racing Team	Honda	+1 lap	
18	(Finland) Eero Hyvärinen		Honda	+1 lap	
19	(Italy) Marco Papa		Suzuki	+2 laps	
20	(Luxembourg) Andreas Leuthe		Honda	+2 laps	
21	(Spain) Andres Perez Rubio		Suzuki	+2 laps	
22	(Spain) Carlos Morante		Suzuki	+3 laps	
23	(Greece) Stelio Marmaras		Suzuki	+4 laps	
24	(France) Christian Sarron	Sonauto Gauloises Yamaha	Yamaha	Accident	
Ret	(Austria) Karl Truchsess		Honda	Retired	
Ret	(Austria) Dietmar Mayer		Honda	Retired	
Ret	(Italy) Marco Lucchinelli		Cagiva	Retired	
Ret	(Italy) Armando Errico	Team Italia	Honda	Retired	
Ret	(Netherlands) Rob Punt	Oud Bier	Suzuki	Retired	
Ret	(France) Thierry Espié		Chevallier	Retired	
Ret	(Italy) Virginio Ferrari	Cagiva	Retired		
Ret	(Belgium) Didier de Radiguès	Honda Benelux Elf	Honda	Retired	
Ret	(France) Christian Le Liard	Team ROC	Honda	Retired	

Previous race: 1985 Swedish Grand Prix	FIM Grand Prix World Championship; 1985 season	Next race: 1986 Spanish Grand Prix
Previous race: 1984 San Marino Grand Prix	San Marino Grand Prix	Next race: 1986 San Marino Grand Prix
