= Fausto Ricci =

Italian motorcycle racer (born 1961)

- Nationality: Italian
Motorcycle racing career statistics
Grand Prix motorcycle racing
Active years	1984–1994
First race	1984 250cc Nations Grand Prix
Last race	1994 125cc Czechoslovak Grand Prix
First win	1984 250cc Nations Grand Prix
Last win	1984 250cc Nations Grand Prix
Starts / Wins / Podiums / Poles / F. laps / Points; 63 / 1 / 5 / 0 / 0 / 103

Fausto Ricci (born 13 March 1961) is an Italian former Grand Prix motorcycle road racer. His best year was in 1985 when he finished fifth in the 250cc world championship. He won the first Grand Prix he entered at the 1984 250cc Nations Grand Prix held at Misano; however, he was never able to win another race thereafter.

Sporting positions
Preceded by (Andorra) Xavier Cardelús	250 cc motorcycle European Champion; 1988	Succeeded by (Italy) Andrea Borgonovo
