= August Auinger =

Austrian motorcycle racer (born 1955)

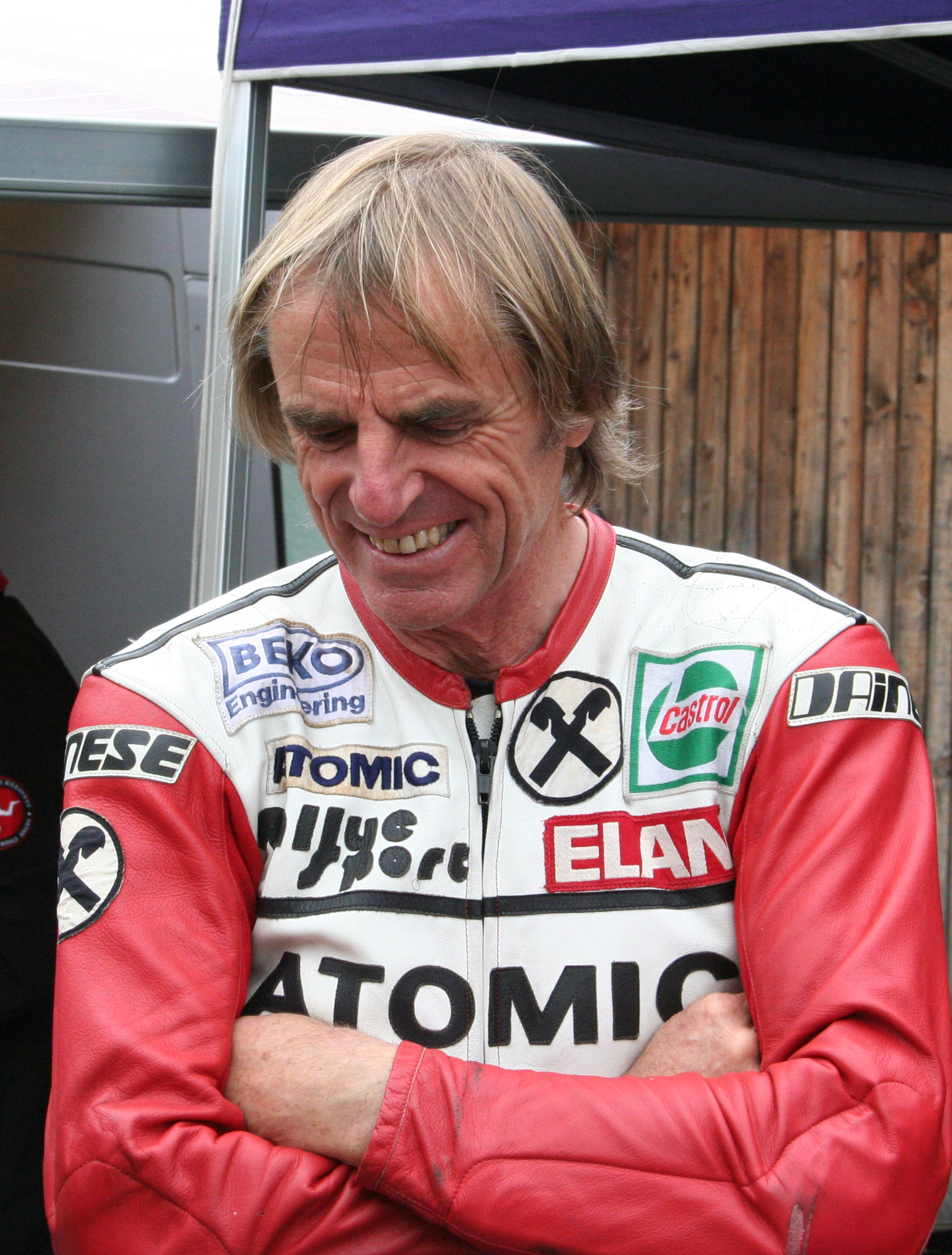
- Auinger in 2016
- Nationality: Austrian
- Born: 3 May 1955 (age 71); Lambach, Allied-occupied Austria
Motorcycle racing career statistics
Grand Prix motorcycle racing
| Active years | 1978–1989 |
| First race | 1978 125cc Belgian Grand Prix |
| Last race | 1989 250cc Czechoslovak Grand Prix |
| First win | 1985 125cc West German Grand Prix |
| Last win | 1986 125cc San Marino Grand Prix |
| Team | Morbidelli |
Starts / Wins / Podiums / Poles / F. laps / Points; 107 / 5 / 18 / 3 / 7 / 415

August "Gustl" Auinger (born 3 May 1955) is an Austrian former Grand Prix motorcycle road racer. His best year was in 1985, when he finished in third place in the 125cc world championship, winning three Grand Prix races in the process. Auinger won a total of five Grand Prix races during his career.

Auinger is now a riders' coach for the Red Bull MotoGP Rookie Cup.
