= Thierry Espié =

French motorcycle racer

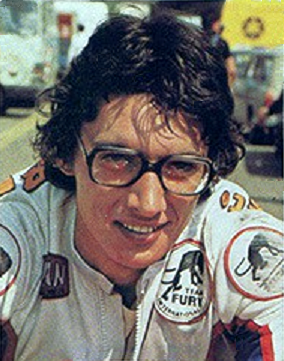
- Thierry Espié in 1978.
- Nationality: French
Motorcycle racing career statistics
Grand Prix motorcycle racing
Active years	1977 - 1985
First race	1977 125cc Finnish Grand Prix
Last race	1985 500cc San Marino Grand Prix
Team(s)	Chevallier, Motobécane
Starts / Wins / Podiums / Poles / F. laps / Points; 68 / 0 / 16 / 3 / 6 / 331

Thierry Espié (born 2 February 1952) is a French former professional motorcycle racer. He competed in Grand Prix motorcycle road racing from 1977 to 1985.

Espié was born in Vanves, France. His best years were in 1979, when he finished in fourth place in the 125cc world championship, and in 1980, when he finished in fourth place in the 250cc world championship.
