= Alain Béraud =

French motorcycle racer (1953-1981)

Alain Béraux
- Nationality: French
- Born: 4 April 1953; Toulon, France
- Died: 4 September 1981 (aged 28); Brno, Czech Republic
Motorcycle racing career statistics
250cc World Championship
Active years	1974-1981
Starts / Wins / Podiums / Poles / F. laps / Points; 7 / 0 / 0 / 0 / 0 / 0

Alain Béraud (4 April 1953 - 3 September 1981) was a French Grand Prix motorcycle racer who competed in the 250cc class. He died following an accident at the 1981 Czechoslovak Grand Prix at the Brno Circuit.

== Biography ==
Béraud began his motorcycle racing career in the early 1970s, and won his first established race at the Paul Ricard 200-mile race in the Criterium 500 class. In the 250cc class of the 1977 French Grand Prix on the Circuit Paul Ricard, he finished 16th on a Yamaha motorbike.

At the final race of the 1981 Grand Prix motorcycle championship, held on 30 August 1981 at the Brno Circuit in then-Czechoslovakia, Béraud crashed out of the race, but managed to restart with the help of track marshals. Due to damages on the bike caused by the initial crash, he then experienced a brake failure in the final section of the circuit and crashed a second time into a guardrail, sustaining major head injuries on impact. He was taken to a local hospital and died from complications on 3 September 1981, four days after the accident, remaining unconscious until his death.

== Grand Prix motorcycle racing results ==
Year	Class	Bike	1	2	3	4	5	6	7	8	9	10	11	12	13	14	Pos	Pts
1977	250cc	Yamaha	VEN	AUT	GER	NAT	FRA; 16	NED	BEL	SWE	FIN	CZE	GBR				-	0
1980	250cc	Yamaha	NAT; Ret	ESP	FRA; 12	YUG	NED	BEL	FIN	GBR	CZE; 16	GER					-	0
1981	250cc	Yamaha	ARG	AUT	GER	NAT	FRA; 11	SPA	YUG	NED	BEL; Ret	SMR	GBR	FIN	SWE	CZE; Ret	-	0
