= Jean-François Baldé =

French motorcycle racer

- Nationality: French
Motorcycle racing career statistics
Grand Prix motorcycle racing
Active years	1973, 1975 - 1989
First race	1973 500cc French Grand Prix
Last race	1989 250cc Brazilian Grand Prix
First win	1981 250cc Argentine Grand Prix
Last win	1983 250 South African Grand Prix
Team	Kawasaki
Starts / Wins / Podiums / Poles / F. laps / Points; 129 / 5 / 26 / 7 / 4 / 546

Jean-François Baldé (born 29 November 1950) is a French former professional Grand Prix motorcycle road racer.

Born in Mulhouse, France, Baldé had his most successful year in 1981, when he won the Argentine Grand Prix and finished in second place in the 250cc world championship behind Anton Mang. He won three races in 1982 riding for Kawasaki and ended the season ranked third in the 350 class. Baldé won five Grand Prix races during his career.

== Motorcycle Grand Prix results ==
Points system from 1968 to 1987

**Position**	1	2	3	4	5	6	7	8	9	10
**Points**	15	12	10	8	6	5	4	3	2	1

Points system from 1988 to 1992

**Position**	1	2	3	4	5	6	7	8	9	10	11	12	13	14	15
**Points**	20	17	15	13	11	10	9	8	7	6	5	4	3	2	1

(key) (Races in bold indicate pole position; races in italics indicate fastest lap)

Year	Class	Team	1	2	3	4	5	6	7	8	9	10	11	12	13	14	15	Points	Rank	Wins
1973	500cc	Yamaha	FRA; 8	AUT -	GER -	IOM -	YUG -	NED -	BEL -	CZE -	SWE -	FIN -	ESP -					3	41st	0
1975	250cc	Yamaha	FRA -	ESP -		GER; 10	NAT -	IOM -	NED -	BEL -	SWE -	FIN -	CZE -	YUG -				1	38th	0
1975	350cc	Yamaha	FRA; 6	ESP -	AUT -	GER -	NAT -	IOM -	NED -			FIN -	CZE -	YUG -				5	26th	0
1975	500cc	Yamaha	FRA -		AUT -	GER -	NAT -	IOM -	NED -	BEL; 10	SWE -	FIN -	CZE -					1	46th	0
1976	250cc	Yamaha	FRA -		NAT; 5	YUG -	IOM -	NED -	BEL; 16	SWE -	FIN; 9	CZE -	GER -	ESP -				8	18th	0
1976	350cc	Yamaha	FRA; 3	AUT; 15	NAT; 12	YUG -	IOM -	NED -			FIN; 11	CZE; Ret	GER -	ESP -				10	18th	0
1977	250cc	Kawasaki	VEN -	GER -	NAT; 7	ESP -	FRA -	YUG -	NED -	BEL -	SWE -	FIN -	CZE; 15	GBR -				4	29th	0
1978	250cc	Kawasaki	VEN -	ESP -	FRA -	NAT; 9	NED -	BEL -	SWE -	FIN; 6	GBR; 7	GER; 4	CZE -	YUG -				19	13th	0
1979	250cc	Kawasaki	VEN -	GER -	NAT; 5	ESP; 7	YUG -	NED; 5	BEL -	SWE; 7	FIN; 7	GBR -	CZE -	FRA; 6				29	8th	0
1980	250cc	Kawasaki	NAT; 2	ESP; 4	FRA -	YUG; 6	NED; 7	BEL -	FIN -	GBR -	CZE; 3	GER; 2						59	3rd	0
1980	350cc	Kawasaki	NAT -		FRA; 5		NED; 7			GBR; 4	CZE; 2	GER; 4						38	3rd	0
1981	250cc	Kawasaki	ARG; 1		GER; 9	NAT; 6	FRA; 4	ESP; 2		**NED**; 6	BEL; 3	RSM; 3	GBR; 7	FIN; 2	SWE; 3	CZE; 9		95	2nd	1
1981	350cc	Kawasaki	ARG; 2	AUT -	GER -	NAT -			YUG; 6	NED; 3			GBR; 3			CZE; 2		49	3rd	0
1982	250cc	Kawasaki			FRA; 2	ESP -	NAT -	NED -	BEL -	YUG -	GBR -	SWE; 3	FIN -	CZE -	RSM -	GER -		22	12th	0
1982	350cc	Kawasaki	ARG; 2	AUT -	FRA; 1		NAT -	NED; 1			GBR; 1		FIN -	CZE -		GER; 9		59	3rd	3
1983	250cc	Chevallier-Yamaha	**RSA**; 1	FRA; 15	NAT; 10	GER; 8	**ESP**; 6	AUT; 12	YUG; 4	NED; NC	BEL -	GBR -	SWE -					32	8th	1
1984	250cc	Pernod-Yamaha	RSA; 7	NAT; 20	ESP; 5	AUT; 9	GER; NC	FRA; 14	YUG -	NED; NC	BEL; 18	GBR; 4	SWE; 6	RSM; NC				25	10th	0
1985	250cc	Pernod-Yamaha	RSA; 7	ESP; 10	GER; 22	NAT -	AUT -	YUG; 13	NED -	BEL; NC	FRA; 8	GBR; NC	SWE; 11	RSM; 22				8	19th	0
1986	250cc	Rothmans-Honda	ESP; 8	NAT; 3	GER; 4	AUT; 3	YUG; 2	NED; 9	BEL; NC	FRA; 4	GBR; NC	SWE; 3	RSM; NC					63	5th	0
1987	250cc	Defi-Yamaha	JPN; 15	ESP -	GER; 15	NAT; NC	AUT; 14	YUG; 18	NED -	FRA; NC	GBR; NC	SWE; 10	CZE; NC	RSM; NC	POR; 6	BRA; 12	ARG -	6	18th	0
1988	250cc	Defi-Rotax	JPN; 21	USA -	ESP; NC	EXP; NC	NAT; NC	GER -	AUT; 23	NED; 19	BEL; NC	YUG; 13	FRA; 20	GBR; 23	SWE; 9	CZE; 21	BRA; 22	10	31st	0
1989	250cc	Motul Forza Shoei Yamaha	JPN; 29	AUS; 26	USA; 25	ESP -	NAT; 25	GER; 25	AUT; 17	YUG; NC	NED; 23	BEL -	FRA -	GBR; 27	SWE; NC	CZE; 31	BRA; 21	0	-	0
