= 1980 Czechoslovak motorcycle Grand Prix =

(Czechoslovakia) 1980 Czechoslovak Grand Prix
Race details
- Race 9 of 10 races in the 1980 Grand Prix motorcycle racing season
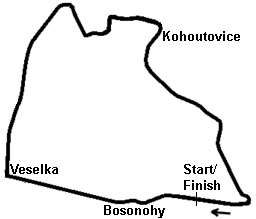
- Date: 17 August 1980
- Official name: Grand Prix ČSSR-Brno
- Location: Brno Circuit
- Course: Permanent racing facility; 5.403 km (3.357 mi)

500cc
Pole position
- Rider: No 500cc race was held
Podium
- First: No 500cc race was held
- Second: No 500cc race was held
- Third: No 500cc race was held

350cc
Pole position
- Rider: (West Germany) Anton Mang
Podium
- First: (West Germany) Anton Mang
- Second: (France) Jean-François Baldé
- Third: (Australia) Jeffrey Sayle

250cc
Pole position
- Rider: (West Germany) Anton Mang
Podium
- First: (West Germany) Anton Mang
- Second: (South Africa) Kork Ballington
- Third: (France) Jean-François Baldé

125cc
Pole position
- Rider: (France) Guy Bertin
Podium
- First: (France) Guy Bertin
- Second: (Italy) Maurizio Massimiani
- Third: (Switzerland) Bruno Kneubühler

80cc
Pole position
- Rider: No 80cc race was held
Podium
- First: No 80cc race was held
- Second: No 80cc race was held
- Third: No 80cc race was held

50cc
Pole position
- Rider: No 50cc race was held
Podium
- First: No 50cc race was held
- Second: No 50cc race was held
- Third: No 50cc race was held

The 1980 Czechoslovak motorcycle Grand Prix was the ninth race of the 1980 Grand Prix motorcycle racing season. It took place on the weekend of 15–17 August 1980 at the Masaryk Circuit in Brno, Czechoslovakia.

== 350cc classification ==
Pos.	Rider	Manufacturer	Time/Retired	Points
1	(Germany) Anton Mang	Krauser	49'00.770	15
2	(France) Jean-François Baldé	Kawasaki	49'55.260	12
3	(Australia) Jeffrey Sayle	Yamaha	50'07.910	10
4	(Switzerland) Jacques Cornu	Yamaha	50'08.220	8
5	(France) Jacques Bolle	Yamaha	50'16.290	6
6	(United Kingdom) Tony Head	Yamaha	50'43.230	5
7	(Italy) Loris Reggiani	Yamaha	50'51.040	4
8	(Italy) Massimo Matteoni	Yamaha	50'51.310	3
9	(Venezuela) Carlos Lavado	Yamaha	50'56.440	2
10	(South Africa) Jon Ekerold	Yamaha	50'56.780	1
11	(France) Eric Saul	Yamaha	51'07.220	
12	(Austria) Ernst Fagerer	Yamaha	51'08.720	
13	(Finland) Eero Hyvärinen	Yamaha	51'13.190	
14	(Australia) Graeme McGregor	Yamaha	51'13.550	
15	(Austria) Siegfried Minich	Yamaha	51'18.490	
16	(Germany) Roland Kopf	Yamaha	51'47.330	
17	(Japan) Yoshimi Matsumoto	Yamaha	51'58.890	
18	(Belgium) René Delaby	Yamaha	52'23.440	
19	(Australia) Murray Sayle	Yamaha	52'43.840	
20	(Finland) Reino Eskelinen	Yamaha	52'45.260	
21	(France) Armand Gras	Yamaha	52'50.270	
22	(Luxembourg) Patrick de Radriguez	Yamaha	+1 lap	
23	(Switzerland) Alan Roethlisberger	Yamaha	+1 lap	

== 250cc classification ==
Pos.	Rider	Manufacturer	Time/Retired	Points
1	(Germany) Anton Mang	Krauser	43'01.000	15
2	(South Africa) Kork Ballington	Kawasaki	43'20.570	12
3	(France) Jean-François Baldé	Kawasaki	43'48.590	10
4	(Switzerland) Roland Freymond	Yamaha	43'49.370	8
5	(Switzerland) Hans Müller	Yamaha	44'14.640	6
6	(France) Thierry Espié	Yamaha	44'15.020	5
7	(Austria) Edi Stöllinger	Kawasaki	44'15.550	4
8	(France) André Gouin	Yamaha	44'16.020	3
9	(Italy) Walter Villa	Yamaha	44'16.520	2
10	(France) Jean-Louis Tournadre	Yamaha	44'30.630	1
11	(Belgium) Jean-Marc Toffolo	Yamaha	44'31.190	
12	(United Kingdom) Chas Mortimer	Cotton	44'35.660	
13	(Belgium) René Delaby	Yamaha	44'40.030	
14	(Austria) Siegfried Minich	Yamaha	44'40.620	
15	(France) Jean-Louis Guignabodet	Kawasaki	44'41.700	
16	(France) Alain Béraud	Yamaha	44'46.500	
17	(Finland) Eero Hyvärinen	Yamaha	45'09.260	
18	(Austria) Stefan Klabacher	Kawasaki	45'10.140	
19	(Germany) Roland Kopf	Yamaha	45'11.030	
20	(United Kingdom) Tony Head	Yamaha	45'16.600	
21	(France) Jean-Jacques Peyre	Yamaha	45'18.210	
22	(Netherlands) Klaas Hernamdt	Yamaha	45'32.300	
23	(Belgium) Olivier Liegeois	Yamaha	45'51.200	
24	(Switzerland) Bruno Lüscher	Yamaha	45'56.120	
25	(France) Thierry Laurens	Yamaha	46'04.810	
26	(France) Guy Batesti	Yamaha	46'16.390	
27	(Spain) Fernando Gonzáles de Nicolás	Yamaha	+1 lap	

== 125cc classification ==
Pos.	Rider	Manufacturer	Time/Retired	Points
1	(France) Guy Bertin	Motobécane	46'00.590	15
2	(Italy) Maurizio Massimiani	Minarelli	46'00.650	12
3	(Switzerland) Hans Müller	MBA	46'07.200	10
4	(Switzerland) Bruno Kneubühler	MBA	46'09.910	8
5	(Italy) Pier-Paolo Bianchi	MBA	46'36.120	6
6	(Hungary) János Drapál	Morbidelli	46'36.680	5
7	(Austria) Harald Bartol	MBA	46'49.340	4
8	(Venezuela) Iván Palazzese	MBA	47'05.590	3
9	(Switzerland) Rolf Blatter	MBA	47'15.050	2
10	(Switzerland) Stefan Dörflinger	Morbidelli	47'30.070	1
11	(Germany) Walter Koschine	MBA	47'36.350	
12	(France) Michel Galbit	MBA	48'06.360	
13	(Austria) Hans-Jürgen Hummel	MBA	48'09.560	
14	(Netherlands) Martin van Soest	MBA	48'10.140	
15	(Spain) Fernando de Nicolás	MBA	48'45.860	
16	(Germany) Alfred Waibel	MBA	48'46.190	
17	(Germany) Hagen Klein	Hess	48'53.160	
18	(Belgium) Chris Baert	MBA	48'54.450	
19	(Finland) Johnny Wickström	MBA	48'56.220	
20	(Sweden) Per-Edvard Carlsson	MBA	48'59.600	
21	(Germany) Stefan Janssen	Morbidelli	49'18.370	
22	(Italy) Italo Zerbini	MBA	49'22.410	
23	(Belgium) René Rénier	MBA	49'23.200	
24	(Germany) Gerhard Waibel	MBA	50'17.540	
25	(Socialist Federal Republic of Yugoslavia) Alojz Pavlic	MBA	+1 lap	
26	(Czechoslovak Socialist Republic) Zbynek Havdra	MBA	+1 lap	
27	(Germany) Wolfgang Glawaty	Rora	+1 lap	
28	(Italy) Paolo Santorini	MBA	+1 lap	

Previous race: 1980 British Grand Prix	FIM Grand Prix World Championship; 1980 season	Next race: 1980 German Grand Prix
Previous race: 1979 Czechoslovak Grand Prix	Czechoslovak Grand Prix	Next race: 1981 Czechoslovak Grand Prix
