= Loris Reggiani =

Italian motorcycle racer

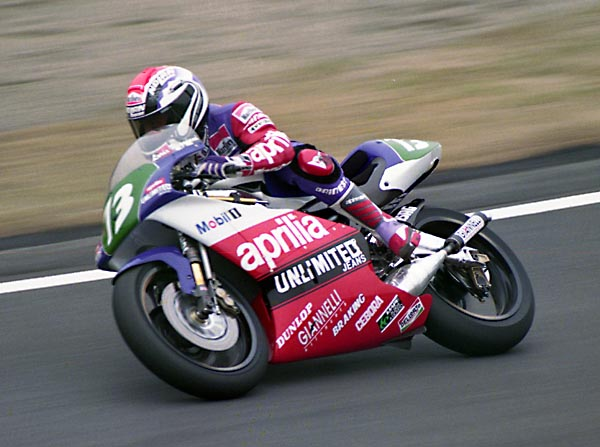
- Reggiani at the 1992 Japanese Grand Prix.
- Nationality: Italian
Motorcycle racing career statistics
Grand Prix motorcycle racing
Active years	1980–1995
First race	1980 125cc Nations Grand Prix
Last race	1995 500cc European Grand Prix
First win	1980 125cc British Grand Prix
Last win	1993 250cc Czechoslovak Grand Prix
Team	Aprilia
Starts / Wins / Podiums / Poles / F. laps / Points; 158 / 8 / 41 / 5 / 8 / 974

Loris Reggiani (born 7 October 1959 in Forlì) is an Italian former Grand Prix motorcycle road racer who competed for the Aprilia factory racing team. He won the Italian 125cc Championship in 1981 aboard a Minarelli.

Reggiani's best years were in 1981, when he won two races in the 125 class, finishing the season in second place behind Angel Nieto, and in 1992 in the 250 class, when he again won two races and finishing in second place again, this time to Luca Cadalora. Reggiani was the first rider to win a Grand Prix for the Aprilia factory when he won the 1987 San Marino Grand Prix. In 1994, Reggiani moved up to the 500cc class aboard a new bike from Aprilia with a V-twin, 250cc engine that had been enlarged to 380cc in hopes of taking advantage of the bike's lightweight and agility against their more powerful competition. In spite of development problems, Reggiani managed a tenth place in the 1995 season. He retired from competition after the 1995 season. He won a total of eight Grands Prix during his career.

== Motorcycle Grand Prix Results ==
Points system from 1969 to 1987:

**Position**	1	2	3	4	5	6	7	8	9	10
**Points**	15	12	10	8	6	5	4	3	2	1

Points system from 1988 to 1992:

**Position**	1	2	3	4	5	6	7	8	9	10	11	12	13	14	15
**Points**	20	17	15	13	11	10	9	8	7	6	5	4	3	2	1

Points system from 1993

**Position**	1	2	3	4	5	6	7	8	9	10	11	12	13	14	15
**Points**	25	20	16	13	11	10	9	8	7	6	5	4	3	2	1

(key) (Races in bold indicate pole position; races in italics indicate fastest lap)

Year	Class	Team	1	2	3	4	5	6	7	8	9	10	11	12	13	14	15	Points	Rank	Wins
1980	125cc	Minarelli	NAT; 4	ESP -	FRA; 3	YUG; 3	NED; 3	BEL; 3	FIN -	GBR; 1	CZE -	GER -						63	6th	1
1980	350cc	Bimota	NAT -		FRA -		NED -			GBR -	CZE; 7	GER -						4	21st	0
1981	125cc	Minarelli	ARG; 2	AUT; 2	GER -	NAT; 2	FRA; 6	ESP; 5	YUG; 1	NED; 2		**RSM**; 1	GBR -	FIN -	SWE; 5	CZE -		95	2nd	2
1981	250cc	MBA	ARG; 8		GER -	NAT -	FRA -	ESP -		NED -	BEL -	RSM -	GBR -	FIN -	SWE -	CZE -		3	30th	0
1982	500cc	Suzuki	ARG; 10	AUT; NC	FRA -	ESP -	NAT -	NED -	BEL -	YUG; 9	GBR; 4	SWE -	RSM -	GER; 3				21	13th	0
1983	500cc	Suzuki	RSA; 11	FRA -	NAT -	GER -	ESP -	AUT -	YUG -	NED -	BEL -	GBR; NC	SWE; 15	RSM -				0	-	0
1984	250cc	Kawasaki	RSA -	NAT -	ESP; 15	AUT; 6	GER; 11	FRA -	YUG; NC	NED -	BEL -	GBR -	SWE -	RSM; 10				6	22nd	0
1985	250cc	Aprilia	RSA; 12	ESP -	GER; 9	NAT; 4	AUT; 5	YUG; 3	NED; 4	BEL; NC	FRA -	GBR -	SWE -	RSM; 3				44	6th	0
1986	250cc	Yamaha	ESP; NC	NAT; 23	GER -	AUT -	YUG -	NED; NC	BEL -	FRA; 13	GBR; NC	SWE; NC	RSM -					0	-	0
1987	250cc	Aprilia	JPN -	ESP; NC	GER; NC	**NAT**; NC	AUT; 2	YUG; 2	NED -	FRA; 7	GBR; 2	SWE; 3	TCH; NC	RSM; 1	POR; NC	BRA; 8	ARG; NC	68	6th	1
1988	250cc	Aprilia	JPN; NC	USA; 12	ESP; NC	EXP; NC	NAT; NC	GER -	AUT -	NED; 5	BEL; NC	YUG; 7	FRA; 9	GBR; NC	SWE; NC	TCH; 4	BRA; NC	44	13th	0
1989	250cc	Honda	JPN; 19	AUS; 11	USA; 9	ESP; NC	NAT -	GER; 9	AUT; 9	YUG; NC	NED; NC	BEL; NC	FRA; NC	GBR; 5	SWE -	TCH -	**BRA**; 3	52	11th	0
1990	250cc	Aprilia	JPN; 19	USA; 12	ESP; 13	NAT; 10	GER; 8	AUT; 10	YUG; NC	NED; NC	BEL; 6	FRA; 3	GBR; NC	SWE; 11	TCH; NC	HUN; 10	AUS; NC	63	13th	0
1991	250cc	Aprilia	JPN; 9	AUS; 5	USA; 3	ESP; 3	ITA; 4	GER; NC	AUT; 8	EUR; 5	NED; NC	FRA; 1	**GBR**; NC	RSM; 3	TCH; NC	VDM; NC	MAL; 4	128	6th	1
1992	250cc	Aprilia	JPN; NC	AUS; 5	MAL; NC	ESP; 1	ITA; 2	EUR; 2	GER; 3	NED; 3	HUN; 2	FRA; 1	GBR; 2	BRA; 3	RSA; 2			159	2nd	2
1993	250cc	Aprilia	AUS; 14	MAL; 7	JPN; NC	ESP; NC	AUT; 4	GER; 5	NED; 6	EUR; NC	**RSM**; 2	GBR; 3	CZE; 1	ITA; 3	USA; 3	FIM; 2		158	3rd	1
1994	500cc	Aprilia	AUS -	MAL -	JPN -	ESP; 9	AUT; NC	GER; NC	NED; NC	ITA; NC	FRA -	GBR -	CZE -	USA -	ARG -	EUR; NC		7	24th	0
1995	500cc	Aprilia	AUS; 11	MAL; 8	JPN; 10	ESP; NC	GER; 9	ITA; 8	NED; 9	FRA; NC	GBR; NC	CZE; 7	BRA; NC	ARG; NC	EUR; 7			59	10th	0
