= Graeme Crosby =

New Zealand motorcycle racer

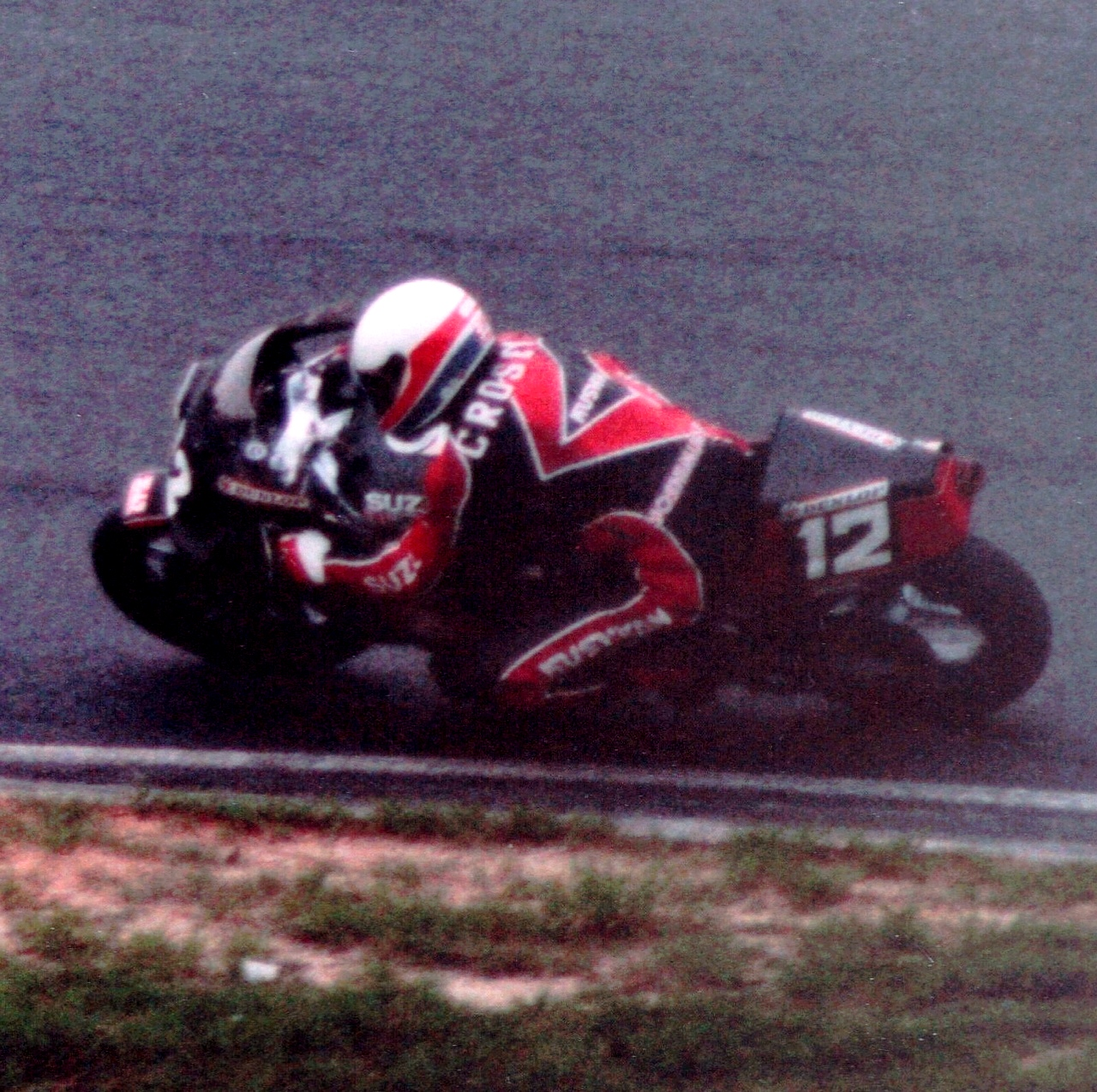
- Graeme Crosby riding for the Yoshimura Suzuki team during the 1983 Suzuka 8 Hours endurance race
- Nationality: New Zealand
- Born: 4 July 1955 (age 71)
Motorcycle racing career statistics
Grand Prix motorcycle racing
Active years	1980 – 1982
First race	1980 500cc Nations Grand Prix
Last race	1982 500cc West German Grand Prix
Team(s)	Suzuki, Yamaha
Starts / Wins / Podiums / Poles / F. laps / Points; 27 / 0 / 10 / 4 / 1 / 173

Graeme Crosby (born 4 July 1955) is a former professional Grand Prix motorcycle road racer from New Zealand. A versatile rider, Crosby was equally capable on either four stroke Superbike racers or two stroke Grand Prix racers. He is the only person to have won the Daytona 200, the Imola 200, the Suzuka 8 Hours endurance race, and the Isle of Man TT.

After his international motorcycle racing career, Crosby returned to New Zealand to become a commercial airline pilot and also competed in touring car racing.

Crosby was inducted in to the New Zealand Sports Hall of Fame in 1995 and the Motorcycling New Zealand Hall of Fame in 2006.

== Motorcycle racing career ==
=== New Zealand and Australian racing ===
Crosby moved from his home in Renwick, New Zealand to Auckland in the late 1960s and began a motorcycle apprenticeship at a local Kawasaki dealership. He began racing on a Kawasaki H2 learning to race on New Zealand's street circuits. By 1979, he was racing in the Australian Superbike Championship for the Australian importer for Pops Yoshimura's motorcycle racing parts company. He was then contracted to race for Yoshimura's son in law, Mamoru Moriwaki another talented motorcycle engineer.

=== International prominence at the Suzuka 8 Hours ===
In the inaugural Suzuka 8 Hours endurance race in 1978, Crosby and co-rider Tony Hatton had an opportunity to win the race on a Moriwaki Kawasaki Kz1000 before running out of fuel relegated them to third place. The following year, Crosby qualified a Moriwaki Kawasaki on pole position at the 1979 Suzuka 8 Hours, ahead of all the major factory racing teams. Moriwaki provided Crosby with Kawasaki motorcycles to compete in the Formula TT world championship and the Isle of Man TT. He placed 4th in the Formula 1 Class at the 1979 Isle of Man TT and finished the season ranked third in the Formula 1 Class of the Formula TT world championship.

=== Suzuki factory sponsorship ===
Crosby's impressive results earned him factory backed sponsorship in 1980 with the Suzuki Grand Prix racing team, operated by their British importer, Suzuki GB. He would compete on a four stroke Suzuki GS1000 in the Formula TT world championship, and ride a two stroke Suzuki RG 500 in the 500cc world championship.

Crosby began the year with an impressive come from behind victory at the 1980 Daytona Superbike race in March. Crosby was forced to start on the back row of the starting grid due to a minor rules infringement during qualifying but, charged through the entire field of competitors enroute to an upset victory over Freddie Spencer, whose Honda was underpowered compared to Crosby's Yoshimura Suzuki. He followed this with a victory in the Senior TT at the 1980 Isle of Man TT races held in June. In July, Crosby teamed with Wes Cooley on a Yoshimura Suzuki GS1000 motorcycle to win the Suzuka 8 Hours endurance race. He then won the Ulster Grand Prix to secure the Formula One Class of the 1980 Formula TT world championship.

Crosby's string of victories with four stroke machinery earned him a reputation as a four stroke specialist. However, he also showed himself to be a capable rider of two stroke machinery when he rode a Suzuki RG 500 to an eighth place ranking in the 1980 500cc world championship, including an impressive second place finish in the 1980 German Grand Prix held at the challenging Nürburgring.

=== 1981 500cc world championship ===
Crosby was contracted by Suzuki GB to defend his Formula TT world championship and to compete alongside teammate Randy Mamola in the 1981 500cc world championship. Crosby gave a boost to the racing career of Wayne Gardner by giving him his first opportunity to race in Europe. Although Crosby was contracted to ride for Suzuki, he decided to sponsor Gardner to compete in the 1981 British Superbike championship riding Kawasakis run by the British Moriwaki concession owned by Crosby. Gardner would go on to become Australia's first 500cc world champion in 1987.

Before the start of the world championship season, Crosby returned to Daytona in March where he just missed winning a second Daytona Superbike race. After a race-long battle with his Yoshimura Suzuki teammate, Wes Cooley and Honda's Freddie Spencer, Crosby was beaten to the finish line by Cooley by just a few bike lengths with Spencer finishing in third place. In the Daytona 200 race, Crosby was forced to retire due to a transmission problem.

Crosby made a strong impression by winning the pole position at the season opening Austrian Grand Prix held at the fast Salzburgring. Crosby led for the first two laps before finishing in second place behind Mamola. He repeated as pole position winner at the German Grand Prix held at the Hockenheimring. After leading the race for half a lap, a front tire slide made him lose confidence in his tires however, he still managed to finish the race in second place behind Kenny Roberts. In the third race in France, Crosby's motorcycle suffered from carburation problems and he nursed it to a third place finish. At the Yugoslavian Grand Prix held at the hot Automotodrom Grobnik, Crosby initially battled for the lead but, later admitted that he was out of shape as he faded to a fourth place finish.

Crosby's championship hopes were dampened when he crashed in the rain at the Dutch TT then, an engine problem left him in sixth place at the Belgian Grand Prix but, he rebounded to finish third in San Marino Grand Prix. Crosby won the pole position at the British Grand Prix held at the Silverstone Circuit but, then had a disastrous crash while leading the race, causing crashes by Barry Sheene and Marco Lucchinelli. His motorcycle had more carburation problems which relegated him to sixth place in the Finnish Grand Prix. He ended the season with a fifth place finish in the rain at the Swedish Grand Prix. He posted two second place finishes along with two third place finishes to end the season ranked fifth in the world.

In between world championship races, Crosby also competed in the 500cc British national championship, using the British rounds as test sessions for developing his RG 500. He dominated the 500cc British national championship, winning seven of the eight rounds. Crosby ended the 1981 season with a victory at the prestigious Mallory Park Race of the Year.

=== 1981 TT Formula One championship ===
Crosby's defense of his TT Formula One title was successful as his Suzuki GS1000 outclassed the Honda RC1000 of his leading rival, Ron Haslam. In nine races that made up the championship, Crosby won six races, finished second once, sat out the Oliver's Mount race over unsafe race conditions, and suffered an engine failure in the last one. He won a controversial victory at the 1981 Isle of Man Formula TT race. Five minutes before his scheduled starting time, Crosby decided to mount a slick tire onto his motorcycle however, the new wheel had the wrong sized sprocket. The ensuing delay caused Crosby to arrive on the starting grid 45 seconds late. ACU race officials refused to allow Crosby to start until all the other competitors had left the starting grid some six minutes later. Race officials announced that Crosby would not be credited with the six minutes lost, ruling him out of contention. The Honda racing team later claimed that they had slowed Haslam and Joey Dunlop's pace upon receiving news of Crosby's time penalty.

Crosby then put on an impressive display of riding talent by racing at a record setting pace that lowered the Formula TT lap record by eight seconds. By the end of the race, Crosby had climbed up into third place behind the apparent winner Haslam and second place Dunlop. However, later that day, an international jury found that the ACU was wrong in not letting Crosby start 45 seconds late and should have penalized him 45 seconds rather than six minutes. The surprise decision meant that Crosby was declared the victor by over two minutes ahead of Haslam. When Crosby finished in second place behind Haslam at the Ulster Grand Prix, he clinched his second successive Formula TT world championship.

=== 1982 Agostini Yamaha ===
Crosby believed that he would be contracted with Suzuki to race their latest RG500 motorcycle in the 1982 500cc world championship however, it became apparent that Suzuki would only provide him with year old motorcycles. He had tentatively agreed with Honda to compete in the AMA Superbike Championship when, Giacomo Agostini offered him a contract to race for the Yamaha factory racing team with Graziano Rossi as his teammate.

Prior to the start of the 1982 Grand Prix season, Crosby returned to Daytona in March with a factory supplied Yamaha YZR750 0W31 built from spare parts, while his main opponents were riding more up-to-date 500cc Grand Prix machinery. Riding at a record setting pace, Crosby won the prestigious Daytona 200 over second place Freddie Spencer. He followed this with a victory at the Imola 200 race in April.

While Yamaha had introduced a new 500cc V4 engine for Kenny Roberts, coded YZR500 0W61, the Agostini-Yamaha team was left to race on the older Yamaha square-four cylinder YZR500 0W60 motorcycle. Crosby jumped into the lead at the start of the season opening Argentine Grand Prix however, he was forced to retire after a couple of laps due to a crankshaft failure. He qualified on pole position for the Austrian Grand Prix but fell to fourth place in the race when he encountered handling issues with his motorcycle. Crosby followed with another fourth place finish in the Spanish Grand Prix. A poor start at the beginning of the Nations Grand Prix left Crosby in mid-field however, a spirited ride saw him improve to third place, passing Kenny Roberts before the end of the race.

The rain drenched Dutch TT was stopped after only six laps when Crosby and several other riders crashed on the wet track surface. After the race was restarted, Crosby made an impressive result by finishing the second leg ahead of Roberts to secure fourth place overall. His Yamaha suffered another crankshaft failure putting him out of the Belgian Grand Prix however, he recovered to finish the Yugoslavian Grand Prix in second place behind eventual world champion Franco Uncini. Crosby crashed during practice for the British Grand Prix badly scraping the skin on the palms of his hands however, after sitting out Saturday practice sessions, he valiantly fought to a third place finish in the race.

While Yamaha had put all their efforts into developing their new V4 engine, they had stopped development work on Crosby's square-four Yamaha allowing it to lose ground on the opposing teams from Suzuki and Honda. When Roberts was forced to withdraw from the championship due to injuries sustained at the British Grand Prix, his V4 Yamaha was given to Crosby for the San Marino Grand Prix however, after he suffered a high speed crash during practice he decided to race on his familiar square-four Yamaha, finishing in third place behind Freddie Spencer and Randy Mamola. Crosby attempted to ride the V4 Yamaha during practice for the season ending German Grand Prix but, he declared that the experience had taken years off his life. He reverted to his square-four Yamaha for the race but, crashed while trying too hard to keep up the pace on the under powered motorcycle. Despite competing with an older and slower motorcycle, Crosby was able to use his riding skill and determination to finish second overall in the championship behind Franco Uncini. Frustrated by the internal politics of his race team, Crosby quit the Grand Prix circuit after the 1982 season.

== Later career ==
After his retirement, Crosby returned to New Zealand and became a commercial airline pilot. He also began auto racing, driving successfully in Touring car racing, mostly in New Zealand and Australia. He won the 1992 New Zealand Touring Car Championship. Crosby was inducted into the New Zealand Sports Hall of Fame in 1995. In 2006, he was inducted into the New Zealand Motorcycling Hall of Fame. Crosby's autobiography entitled CROZ – Larrikin Biker was published in 2010.

== Grand Prix career statistics ==
Points system from 1968 to 1987.

**Position**	1	2	3	4	5	6	7	8	9	10
**Points**	15	12	10	8	6	5	4	3	2	1

(key) (Races in bold indicate pole position; races in italics indicate fastest lap)

Year	Class	Team	Machine	1	2	3	4	5	6	7	8	9	10	11	12	Points	Rank	Wins
1980	500cc	Heron-Suzuki	RG500	NAT; Ret	ESP; 12	FRA; 5	NED; 8	BEL; 4	FIN; DNS	GBR; 13	GER; 2					29	8th	0
1981	500cc	Heron-Suzuki	RGB500	**AUT**; 2	**GER**; 13	NAT; 2	FRA; 3	YUG; 4	NED; Ret	BEL; 7	RSM; 3	**GBR**; Ret	FIN; 5	SWE; 5		68	5th	0
1982	500cc	Marlboro Agostini-Yamaha	YZR500	ARG; Ret	**AUT**; 4	FRA	ESP; 4	NAT; 3	NED; 4	BEL; Ret	YUG; 2	GBR; 3	SWE; 3	RSM; 3	GER; Ret	**76**	**2nd**	0

=== Suzuka 8 Hours results ===
Year	Team	Co-Rider	Bike	Pos
1980	(Japan) Yoshimura R&D	(New Zealand) Graeme Crosby (United States) Wes Cooley	Suzuki GS1000	**1st**

== Car racing ==
=== Career results ===
Results sourced from Driver Database.

Season	Series	Position	Car	Team
1986	Nissan-Mobil 500 series	5th	BMW 635 CSi	
1986	Australian Touring Car Championship	7th	Holden VK Commodore SS Group A	Graeme Crosby
1986	Australian Endurance Championship	16th	Holden VK Commodore SS Group A	Bob Jane T-Marts
1986	South Pacific Touring Car Championship	3rd	Holden VK Commodore SS Group A	Bob Jane T-Marts
1987	Nissan-Mobil 500 series	6th	Holden VK Commodore SS Group A	Graeme Crosby
1987	World Touring Car Championship	NC	Holden VK Commodore SS Group A Nissan Skyline DR30 RS	D.F.C. NZ Ltd; Team Nissan Racing NZ
1990	Nissan-Mobil 500 series	4th	Ford Sierra RS500	Miedecke Motorsport
1991	Nissan-Mobil 500 series	4th	Ford Sierra RS500	Playscape Racing
1992	Nissan-Mobil 500 series	2nd	Holden VP Commodore	Mobil 1 Racing
1992	New Zealand Touring Car Championship	1st	Ford Sierra RS500	Graeme Crosby

=== Complete Australian Touring Car Championship results ===
(key) (Races in bold indicate pole position) (Races in italics indicate fastest lap)

Year	Team	Car	1	2	3	4	5	6	7	8	9	10	DC	Points
1986	Graeme Crosby	Holden VK Commodore SS Group A	AMA; Ret	SYM; 4	SAN; 12	AIR; 2	WAN; 6	SUR; Ret	CAL; 4	LAK; 9	WIN; 7	ORA; 12	7th	102
1987	Roadways Racing	Holden VK Commodore SS Group A	CAL; Ret	SYM; Ret	LAK	WAN	AIR	SUR	SAN	AMA	ORA		NC	0

=== Complete South Pacific Touring Car Championship results ===
(key) (Races in bold indicate pole position) (Races in italics indicate fastest lap)

Year	Team	Car	1	2	3	4	5	DC	Points
1986	(Australia) Bob Jane T-Marts	Holden VK Commodore SS Group A	CAL; 9	ADE; 3	**MAN**; 1	**BAY**; Ret	**PUK**; Ret	3rd	73

=== Complete World Touring Car Championship results ===
(key) (Races in bold indicate pole position) (Races in italics indicate fastest lap)

Year	Team	Car	1	2	3	4	5	6	7	8	9	10	11	DC	Points
1987	(New Zealand) D.F.C. NZ	Holden VK Commodore SS Group A	MNZ	JAR	DIJ	NUR	SPA	BNO	SIL	BAT; Ret	CLD			NC	0
1987	(New Zealand) Team Nissan Racing NZ	Nissan Skyline DR30 RS										WEL ovr:8 cls:5	FJI	NC	0

† Not registered for series & points

=== Complete NASCAR results ===
Year	Car	No.	1	2	3	4	5	6	7	8	9	10	11	12	13	14	15	16	17	18	19	20	21	22	23	24	25	26	27	28	29	NSCC	Points
1987	Oldsmobile Cutlass	03	DAY	ROC	RIC	ATL	DAR	WIL	BRI	MAR	TAL	CMS; DNQ	DOV	POC	RIV	MCH	DAY	POC	TAL	WAT	MIC	BRI	DAR	RIC	DOV	MAR	WIL	CMS	ROC	RIV	ATL	NC	0

=== Complete Asia-Pacific Touring Car Championship results ===
(key) (Races in bold indicate pole position) (Races in italics indicate fastest lap)

Year	Team	Car	1	2	3	4	DC	Points
1988	(Australia) Miedecke Motorsport	Ford Sierra RS500	BAT	WEL	PUK	FJI; Ret	NC	0

=== Complete Bathurst 1000 results ===
Year	Team	Co-drivers	Car	Class	Laps	Pos.	Class pos.
1986	(New Zealand) Bob Jane T-Marts	(New Zealand) Wayne Wilkinson	Holden VK Commodore SS Group A	C	156	13th	9th
1987	(New Zealand) D.F.C. NZ Ltd	(New Zealand) John Billington	Holden VK Commodore SS Group A	1	9	DNF	DNF
1989	(Australia) Miedecke Motorsport	(New Zealand) Andrew Bagnall	Ford Sierra RS500	A	97	DNF	DNF
1990	(Australia) Caltex CXT Racing Team	(Australia) Colin Bond	Ford Sierra RS500	1	44	DNF	DNF
1991	(Australia) Caltex CXT Racing Team	(Australia) Colin Bond	Ford Sierra RS500	1	152	DNF	DNF

== Bibliography ==
- Crosby, Graeme (1 November 2010). Croz: Larrikin Biker. The Graeme Crosby Story. HarperCollins. ISBN 978-1869508531.

Sporting positions
Preceded by Ron Haslam	TT Formula One World Champion; 1980–1981	Succeeded by Joey Dunlop
