= 1980 German motorcycle Grand Prix =

(West Germany) 1980 German Grand Prix
Race details
- Race 10 of 10 races in the 1980 Grand Prix motorcycle racing season
- Date: 24 August 1980
- Official name: Grosser Preis von Deutschland
- Location: Nürburgring-Nordschleife
- Course: Permanent racing facility; 22.834 km (14.188 mi)

500cc
Pole position
- Rider: (United States) Randy Mamola
- Time: 8:24.910
Fastest lap
- Rider: (Italy) Marco Lucchinelli
- Time: 8:22.230
Podium
- First: (Italy) Marco Lucchinelli
- Second: (New Zealand) Graeme Crosby
- Third: (Netherlands) Wil Hartog

350cc
Pole position
- Rider: (West Germany) Anton Mang
- Time: 8:37.290
Fastest lap
- Rider: Unknown
Podium
- First: (South Africa) Jon Ekerold
- Second: (West Germany) Anton Mang
- Third: (Venezuela) Johnny Cecotto

250cc
Pole position
- Rider: (West Germany) Anton Mang
- Time: 8:37.290
Fastest lap
- Rider: Unknown
Podium
- First: (South Africa) Kork Ballington
- Second: (France) Jean-François Baldé
- Third: (West Germany) Anton Mang

125cc
Pole position
- Rider: (France) Guy Bertin
- Time: 9:28.050
Fastest lap
- Rider: Unknown
Podium
- First: (France) Guy Bertin
- Second: (Spain) Ángel Nieto
- Third: (Switzerland) Hans Müller

50cc
Pole position
- Rider: (Spain) Ricardo Tormo
- Time: 10:22.450
Fastest lap
- Rider: Unknown
Podium
- First: (Switzerland) Stefan Dörflinger
- Second: (Italy) Eugenio Lazzarini
- Third: (Austria) Hans-Jürgen Hummel

The 1980 German motorcycle Grand Prix was the last round of the 1980 Grand Prix motorcycle racing season. It took place on the weekend of 22–24 August 1980 at the Nürburgring-Nordschleife.

== Classification ==
=== 500 cc ===
Pos	Rider	Manufacturer	Time/Retired	Points
1	(Italy) Marco Lucchinelli	Team Nava Olio Fiat	50'38.330	15
2	(New Zealand) Graeme Crosby	Texaco Heron Team Suzuki	+19.710	12
3	(Netherlands) Wil Hartog	Riemersma Racing	+23.670	10
4	(United States) Kenny Roberts	Yamaha Motor Company	+47.900	8
5	(United States) Randy Mamola	Suzuki	+49.730	6
6	(Venezuela) Johnny Cecotto	Venemotos Racing Team	+51.700	5
7	(Italy) Franco Uncini	Suzuki	+1'13.740	4
8	(Netherlands) Jack Middelburg	Yamaha IMN	+1'35.610	3
9	(Italy) Carlo Perugini	Suzuki	+1'38.600	2
10	(West Germany) Gustav Reiner	Nava Kucera Racing Team	+1'40.360	1
11	(South Africa) Kork Ballington	Team Kawasaki	+2'05.610	
12	(Japan) Takazumi Katayama	Suzuki	+2'07.440	
13	(Italy) Maurizio Massimiani	Scuderia Naldoni Imola	+2'59.600	
14	(New Zealand) Stuart Avant	Dieter Braun Team	+2'59.890	
15	(Japan) Sadao Asami	Yamaha Motor Company	+3'14.820	
16	(United States) Dale Singleton	Beaulieu Racing	+3'17.220	
17	(United Kingdom) Steve Parrish	Steve Parrish Racing	+3'22.260	
18	(Austria) Werner Nenning	Mobel Nenning Racing Team	+3'36.790	
19	(West Germany) Josef Hage	Dieter Braun Team	+4'07.770	
20	(West Germany) Peter Ammann	Barbula und Hauser Motorradzubehor	+4'40.590	
21	(Italy) Gianni Pelletier	Morbidelli	+1 lap	
22	(Switzerland) Wolfgang von Muralt	Wolfgang von Muralt Racing Team	+1 lap	
23	(Finland) Seppo Rossi	Suzuki	+1 lap	
24	(West Germany) Jürgen Steiner	Suzuki	+1 lap	
25	(Austria) Max Wiener	Suzuki	+1 lap	
26	(Austria) Michael Schmid	Suzuki	+1 lap	
27	(France) Alois Tost	Yamaha	+1 lap	
28	(West Germany) Bruno Kölble	Yamaha	+1 lap	
29	(Austria) Bert Schneider	Suzuki	+1 lap	
Ret	(West Germany) Clemens Driesch	Bronni Sieker Team	Retired	
Ret	(West Germany) Fritz Reitmaier	Suzuki	Retired	
Ret	(Italy) Carlo Prati	Suzuki	Retired	
Ret	(Switzerland) Philippe Coulon	Marlboro Nava Frankonia	Retired	
Ret	(Australia) Jeff Sayle	George Beale Team Castrol	Retired	
Ret	(Switzerland) Sergio Pellandini	Suzuki	Retired	
Ret	(Netherlands) Willem Zoet	Stimorol Racing	Retired	
Ret	(Australia) Gregg Hansford	Team Kawasaki Australia	Retired	
Ret	(West Germany) Elmar Renner	Suzuki	Retired	
Ret	(Netherlands) Boet van Dulmen	Yamaha Motor Company	Retired	
Ret	(Italy) Virginio Ferrari	Cagiva	Retired	
Ret	(Italy) Graziano Rossi	Team Nava Olio Fiat	Retired	
Ret	(Switzerland) Michel Frutschi	Elf Motor Racing Team	Retired	
Ret	(France) Franck Gross	Elf Motor Racing Team	Retired	
Ret	(West Germany) Klaus Klein	Suzuki	Retired	
DNS	(South Africa) Jon Ekerold	Team Solitude International	Did not start	

Previous race: 1980 Czechoslovak Grand Prix	FIM Grand Prix World Championship; 1980 season	Next race: 1981 Argentine Grand Prix
Previous race: 1979 German Grand Prix	German Grand Prix	Next race: 1981 German Grand Prix
