= 1980 British motorcycle Grand Prix =

(United Kingdom) 1980 British Grand Prix
Race details
- Race 8 of 10 races in the 1980 Grand Prix motorcycle racing season
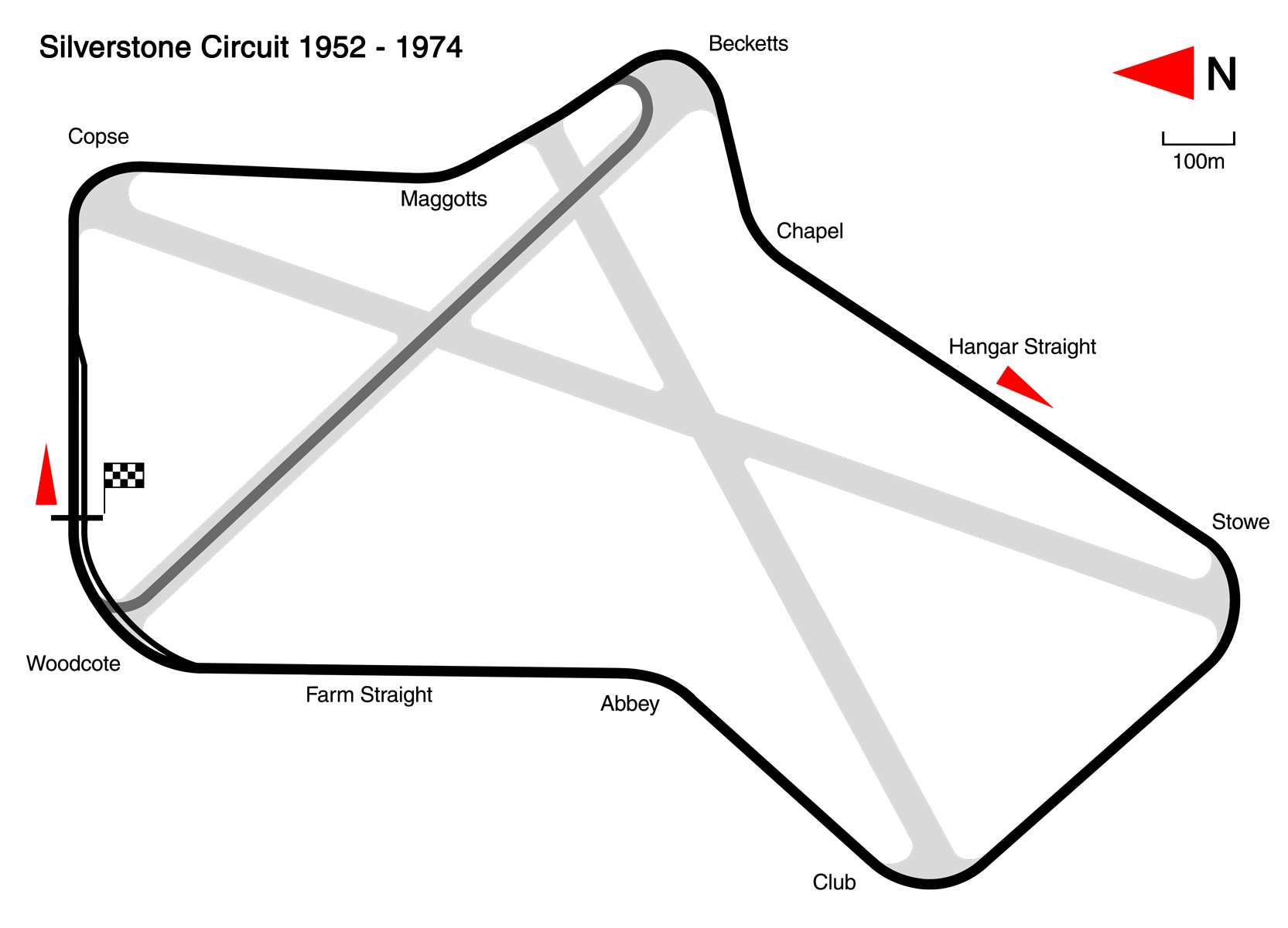
- Date: 10 August 1980
- Official name: Marlboro British Grand Prix
- Location: Silverstone Circuit
- Course: Permanent racing facility; 4.711 km (2.927 mi)

500cc
Pole position
- Rider: (United States) Kenny Roberts
- Time: 1:30.710
Fastest lap
- Rider: (United States) Kenny Roberts
- Time: 1:30.700
Podium
- First: (United States) Randy Mamola
- Second: (United States) Kenny Roberts
- Third: (Italy) Marco Lucchinelli

350cc
Pole position
- Rider: (West Germany) Anton Mang
- Time: 1:32.780
Fastest lap
- Rider: (West Germany) Anton Mang
- Time: 1:33.790
Podium
- First: (West Germany) Anton Mang
- Second: (South Africa) Jon Ekerold
- Third: (France) Éric Saul

250cc
Pole position
- Rider: (West Germany) Anton Mang
- Time: 1:35.190
Fastest lap
- Rider: (West Germany) Anton Mang
- Time: 1:34.980
Podium
- First: (South Africa) Kork Ballington
- Second: (West Germany) Anton Mang
- Third: (France) Thierry Espié

125cc
Pole position
- Rider: (France) Guy Bertin
- Time: 1:41.230
Fastest lap
- Rider: (Spain) Ángel Nieto
- Time: 1:41.480
Podium
- First: (Italy) Loris Reggiani
- Second: (Switzerland) Bruno Kneubühler
- Third: (Italy) Pier Paolo Bianchi

50cc
Pole position
- Rider: No 50cc race was held
Fastest lap
- Rider: No 50cc race was held
Podium
- First: No 50cc race was held
- Second: No 50cc race was held
- Third: No 50cc race was held

The 1980 British motorcycle Grand Prix was the eighth round of the 1980 Grand Prix motorcycle racing season. It took place on the weekend of 8–10 August 1980 at the Silverstone Circuit.

== Classification ==
=== 500 cc ===
Pos	Rider	Manufacturer	Time/Retired	Points
1	(United States) Randy Mamola	Suzuki	42'52.710	15
2	(United States) Kenny Roberts	Yamaha Motor Company	+11.150	12
3	(Italy) Marco Lucchinelli	Team Nava Olio Fiat	+26.390	10
4	(Italy) Graziano Rossi	Team Nava Olio Fiat	+26.510	8
5	(Venezuela) Johnny Cecotto	Venemotos Racing Team	+46.210	6
6	(Italy) Franco Uncini	Suzuki	+49.780	5
7	(South Africa) Kork Ballington	Team Kawasaki	+56.020	4
8	(Switzerland) Philippe Coulon	Marlboro Nava Frankonia	+1'03.500	3
9	(Netherlands) Jack Middelburg	Yamaha IMN	+1'10.670	2
10	(United Kingdom) Dave Potter	Yamaha IMN	+1'16.230	1
11	(United States) Dale Singleton	Beaulieu Racing	+1'16.420	
12	(United Kingdom) John Newbold	Team Appleby Glade	+1'18.570	
13	(New Zealand) Graeme Crosby	Texaco Heron Team Suzuki	+1'19.910	
14	(France) Raymond Roche	Team Sonauto Gauloises	+1'39.160	
15	(Japan) Takazumi Katayama	Suzuki	+1 lap	
16	(Netherlands) Boet van Dulmen	Yamaha Motor Company	+1 lap	
17	(United Kingdom) Steve Parrish	Steve Parrish Racing	+1 lap	
18	(United Kingdom) Roger Marshall	George Beale Team Castrol	+1 lap	
19	(Netherlands) Willem Zoet	Stimorol Racing	+1 lap	
20	(Sweden) Peter Sjöström	Suzuki	+1 lap	
21	(United Kingdom) Phil Henderson	Suzuki	+1 lap	
22	(West Germany) Gustav Reiner	Nava Kucera Racing Team	+1 lap	
23	(Austria) Werner Nenning	Mobel Nenning Racing Team	+1 lap	
24	(West Germany) Gerhard Vogt	Suzuki	+1 lap	
25	(Netherlands) Henk de Vries	Suzuki	+1 lap	
Ret	(Italy) Carlo Perugini	Suzuki	Retired	
Ret	(Netherlands) Wil Hartog	Riemersma Racing	Retired	
Ret	(United Kingdom) Graham Wood	Yamaha	Retired	
Ret	(United Kingdom) Barry Sheene	Yamaha Motor Company	Retired	
Ret	(Italy) Gianni Rolando	Suzuki	Retired	
Ret	(United Kingdom) Steve Manship	Yamaha	Retired	
Ret	(France) Bernard Fau	GME Motul GPA	Retired	
Ret	(France) Hubert Rigal	Moto Club de Monaco	Retired	
Ret	(Switzerland) Michel Frutschi	Elf Motor Racing Team	Retired	
Ret	(Australia) Jeff Sayle	George Beale Team Castrol	Retired	
Ret	(Finland) Seppo Rossi	Suzuki	Retired	
Ret	(Japan) Sadao Asami	Yamaha Motor Company	Retired	
Ret	(New Zealand) Stuart Avant	Dieter Braun Team	Retired	
Ret	(France) Patrick Pons	Team Sonauto Gauloises	Fatal accident	
Ret	(France) Michel Rougerie	Ecurie Ste Pernod	Retired	
DNS	(United Kingdom) Ron Haslam	Yamaha Motor Company	Did not start	

Previous race: 1980 Finnish Grand Prix	FIM Grand Prix World Championship; 1980 season	Next race: 1980 Czechoslovak Grand Prix
Previous race: 1979 British Grand Prix	British Grand Prix	Next race: 1981 British Grand Prix
