= 1980 Dutch TT =

(Netherlands) 1980 Dutch TT
Race details
- Race 5 of 10 races in the 1980 Grand Prix motorcycle racing season
- Date: 28 June 1980
- Official name: Dutch TT Assen
- Location: TT Circuit Assen
- Course: Permanent racing facility; 6.049 km (3.759 mi)

500cc
Pole position
- Rider: (Netherlands) Jack Middelburg
- Time: 2:55.800
Fastest lap
- Rider: (United States) Randy Mamola
- Time: 2:57.600
Podium
- First: (Netherlands) Jack Middelburg
- Second: (Italy) Graziano Rossi
- Third: (Italy) Franco Uncini

350cc
Pole position
- Rider: (West Germany) Anton Mang
- Time: 2:59.300
Fastest lap
- Rider: Unknown
Podium
- First: (South Africa) Jon Ekerold
- Second: (France) Patrick Fernandez
- Third: (West Germany) Anton Mang

250cc
Pole position
- Rider: (West Germany) Anton Mang
- Time: 3:03.700
Fastest lap
- Rider: Unknown
Podium
- First: (Venezuela) Carlos Lavado
- Second: (France) Éric Saul
- Third: (West Germany) Anton Mang

125cc
Pole position
- Rider: (France) Guy Bertin
- Time: 3:13.900
Fastest lap
- Rider: Unknown
Podium
- First: (Spain) Ángel Nieto
- Second: (France) Guy Bertin
- Third: (Italy) Loris Reggiani

50cc
Pole position
- Rider: (Spain) Ricardo Tormo
- Time: 3:33.400
Fastest lap
- Rider: Unknown
Podium
- First: (Spain) Ricardo Tormo
- Second: (Switzerland) Stefan Dörflinger
- Third: (Italy) Eugenio Lazzarini

The 1980 Dutch TT was the fifth round of the 1980 Grand Prix motorcycle racing season. It took place on the weekend of 27–28 June 1980 at the TT Circuit Assen located in Assen, Netherlands.

== Classification ==
=== 500 cc ===
Pos	Rider	Manufacturer	Time/Retired	Points
1	(Netherlands) Jack Middelburg	Yamaha IMN	48'22.000	15
2	(Italy) Graziano Rossi	Team Nava Olio Fiat	+14.000	12
3	(Italy) Franco Uncini	Suzuki	+15.800	10
4	(Netherlands) Boet van Dulmen	Yamaha Motor Company	+29.400	8
5	(United States) Randy Mamola	Suzuki	+29.500	6
6	(Venezuela) Johnny Cecotto	Venemotos Racing Team	+32.800	5
7	(France) Patrick Fernandez	Ecurie Ste Pernod	+1 lap	4
8	(New Zealand) Graeme Crosby	Texaco Heron Team Suzuki	+1 lap	3
9	(Netherlands) Henk de Vries	Suzuki	+1 lap	2
10	(France) Patrick Pons	Team Sonauto Gauloises	+1 lap	1
11	(Australia) Jeff Sayle	George Beale Team Castrol	+1 lap	
12	(Netherlands) Willem Zoet	Stimorol Racing	+1 lap	
13	(Finland) Markku Matikainen	Saga Racing	+1 lap	
14	(France) Michel Rougerie	Ecurie Ste Pernod	+1 lap	
15	(United Kingdom) Dave Potter	Yamaha IMN	+1 lap	
16	(South Africa) Eddie Grant	Suzuki	+1 lap	
17	(United Kingdom) Steve Parrish	Steve Parrish Racing	+1 lap	
18	(United States) Dale Singleton	Beaulieu Racing	+1 lap	
19	(Netherlands) Wil Hartog	Riemersma Racing	+1 lap	
Ret	(Japan) Takazumi Katayama	Suzuki	Retired	
Ret	(United States) Kenny Roberts	Yamaha Motor Company	Retired	
Ret	(France) Hubert Rigal	Moto Club de Monaco	Retired	
Ret	(Italy) Carlo Perugini	Suzuki	Retired	
Ret	(Italy) Marco Lucchinelli	Team Nava Olio Fiat	Retired	
Ret	(Switzerland) Michel Frutschi	Elf Motor Racing Team	Retired	
Ret	(Switzerland) Philippe Coulon	Marlboro Nava Frankonia	Retired	
Ret	(France) Christian Estrosi	Team Furygan Suzuki	Retired	
Ret	(South Africa) Jon Ekerold	Team Solitude International	Retired	
Ret	(Austria) Werner Nenning	Mobel Nenning Racing Team	Retired	
Ret	(United Kingdom) Barry Sheene	Yamaha Motor Company	Retired	
DNS	(Netherlands) Dick Alblas	Stimorol Racing	Did not start	

Previous race: 1980 Yugoslavian Grand Prix	FIM Grand Prix World Championship; 1980 season	Next race: 1980 Belgian Grand Prix
Previous race: 1979 Dutch TT	Dutch TT	Next race: 1981 Dutch TT
