= 1980 Belgian motorcycle Grand Prix =

(Belgium) 1980 Belgian Grand Prix
Race details
- Race 6 of 10 races in the 1980 Grand Prix motorcycle racing season
- Date: 6 July 1980
- Official name: Grand Prix of Belgium
- Location: Circuit Zolder
- Course: Permanent racing facility; 4.262 km (2.648 mi)

500cc
Pole position
- Rider: (United States) Randy Mamola
- Time: 1:40.410
Fastest lap
- Rider: (Italy) Marco Lucchinelli
- Time: 1:40.820
Podium
- First: (United States) Randy Mamola
- Second: (Italy) Marco Lucchinelli
- Third: (United States) Kenny Roberts

350cc
Pole position
- Rider: No 350cc race was held
Fastest lap
- Rider: No 350cc race was held
Podium
- First: No 350cc race was held
- Second: No 350cc race was held
- Third: No 350cc race was held

250cc
Pole position
- Rider: Unknown
Fastest lap
- Rider: Unknown
Podium
- First: (West Germany) Anton Mang
- Second: (Italy) Giampaolo Marchetti
- Third: (France) Patrick Fernandez

125cc
Pole position
- Rider: Unknown
Fastest lap
- Rider: Unknown
Podium
- First: (Spain) Ángel Nieto
- Second: (France) Guy Bertin
- Third: (Italy) Loris Reggiani

50cc
Pole position
- Rider: Unknown
Fastest lap
- Rider: Unknown
Podium
- First: (Switzerland) Stefan Dörflinger
- Second: (Italy) Eugenio Lazzarini
- Third: (France) Yves Dupont

The 1980 Belgian motorcycle Grand Prix was the sixth round of the 1980 Grand Prix motorcycle racing season. It took place on the weekend of 4–6 July 1980 at the Circuit Zolder.

This was the only time that a race was held in Zolder, after all the factory teams (with drivers such as Kenny Roberts, Franco Uncini, Graziano Rossi, Jack Middelburg and various others) retired due to the slippery and very dangerous conditions at Spa-Francorchamps after a resurfacing of the track.

== Classification ==
=== 500 cc ===
Pos	Rider	Manufacturer	Time/Retired	Points
1	(United States) Randy Mamola	Suzuki	51'07.210	15
2	(Italy) Marco Lucchinelli	Team Nava Olio Fiat	+12.400	12
3	(United States) Kenny Roberts	Yamaha Motor Company	+31.140	10
4	(New Zealand) Graeme Crosby	Texaco Heron Team Suzuki	+34.930	8
5	(Netherlands) Wil Hartog	Riemersma Racing	+40.750	6
6	(Italy) Franco Uncini	Suzuki	+56.260	5
7	(Italy) Carlo Perugini	Suzuki	+1'26.330	4
8	(France) Patrick Pons	Team Sonauto Gauloises	+1'32.300	3
9	(Netherlands) Boet van Dulmen	Yamaha Motor Company	+1'32.460	2
10	(France) Bernard Fau	GME Motul GPA	+1'45.590	1
11	(Switzerland) Philippe Coulon	Marlboro Nava Frankonia	+1 lap	
12	(France) Raymond Roche	Team Sonauto Gauloises	+1 lap	
13	(Italy) Maurizio Massimiani	Scuderia Naldoni Imola	+1 lap	
14	(Netherlands) Willem Zoet	Stimorol Racing	+1 lap	
15	(Japan) Sadao Asami	Yamaha Motor Company	+1 lap	
16	(Finland) Seppo Rossi	Suzuki	+1 lap	
17	(Australia) Kenny Blake	Yamaha	+2 laps	
Ret	(Australia) Jeff Sayle	George Beale Team Castrol	Retired	
Ret	(Venezuela) Johnny Cecotto	Venemotos Racing Team	Retired	
Ret	(West Germany) Gustav Reiner	Nava Kucera Racing Team	Retired	
Ret	(West Germany) Klaus Nies	Yamaha Motor Company	Retired	
Ret	(United States) Dale Singleton	Beaulieu Racing	Retired	
Ret	(United States) Freddie Spencer	Yamaha Motor Company	Fuel problem	
Ret	(Italy) Graziano Rossi	Team Nava Olio Fiat	Accident	
Ret	(France) Franck Gross	Elf Motor Racing Team	Retired	
Ret	(France) Michel Rougerie	Ecurie Ste Pernod	Retired	
Ret	(Italy) Franco Bonera	Yamaha	Retired	
Ret	(France) Patrick Fernandez	Ecurie Ste Pernod	Accident	
Ret	(Netherlands) Jack Middelburg	Yamaha IMN	Accident	
DNS	(Finland) Markku Matikainen	Suzuki	Did not start	
DNQ	(Sweden) Peter Sjöström	Suzuki	Did not qualify	
DNQ	(Belgium) Philippe Chaltin	Suzuki	Did not qualify	
DNQ	(France) Hubert Rigal	Moto Club de Monaco	Did not qualify	
DNQ	(Netherlands) Henk de Vries	Suzuki	Did not qualify	
DNQ	(United Kingdom) Dave Potter	Yamaha IMN	Did not qualify	
DNQ	(France) Christian Estrosi	Team Furygan Suzuki	Did not qualify	
DNQ	(United Kingdom) Steve Parrish	Steve Parrish Racing	Did not qualify	
DNQ	(United Kingdom) Barry Sheene	Yamaha Motor Company	Did not qualify	
DNQ	(Italy) Gianni Pelletier	Morbidelli	Did not qualify	
DNQ	(New Zealand) Stuart Avant	Dieter Braun Team	Did not qualify	
DNQ	(Switzerland) Michel Frutschi	Elf Motor Racing Team	Did not qualify	
DNQ	(Switzerland) Sergio Pellandini	Suzuki	Did not qualify	
DNQ	(Netherlands) Albert Siegers	Suzuki	Did not qualify	
DNQ	(Italy) Carlo Prati	Suzuki	Did not qualify	
DNQ	(New Zealand) Dennis Ireland	Suzuki	Did not qualify	
DNQ	(West Germany) Josef Hage	Suzuki	Did not qualify	
DNQ	(Japan) Masaru Iwasaki	Suzuki	Did not qualify	
DNQ	(West Germany) Walter Koschine	Suzuki	Did not qualify	
DNQ	(Spain) Antonio Garcia	Yamaha	Did not qualify	
DNQ	(Netherlands) Henk Twikler	Suzuki	Did not qualify	
DNQ	(Belgium) Jean Philippe Delers	Yamaha	Did not qualify	

Previous race: 1980 Dutch TT	FIM Grand Prix World Championship; 1980 season	Next race: 1980 Finnish Grand Prix
Previous race: 1979 Belgian Grand Prix	Belgian Grand Prix	Next race: 1981 Belgian Grand Prix
