= 1980 Grand Prix motorcycle racing season =

Sports season

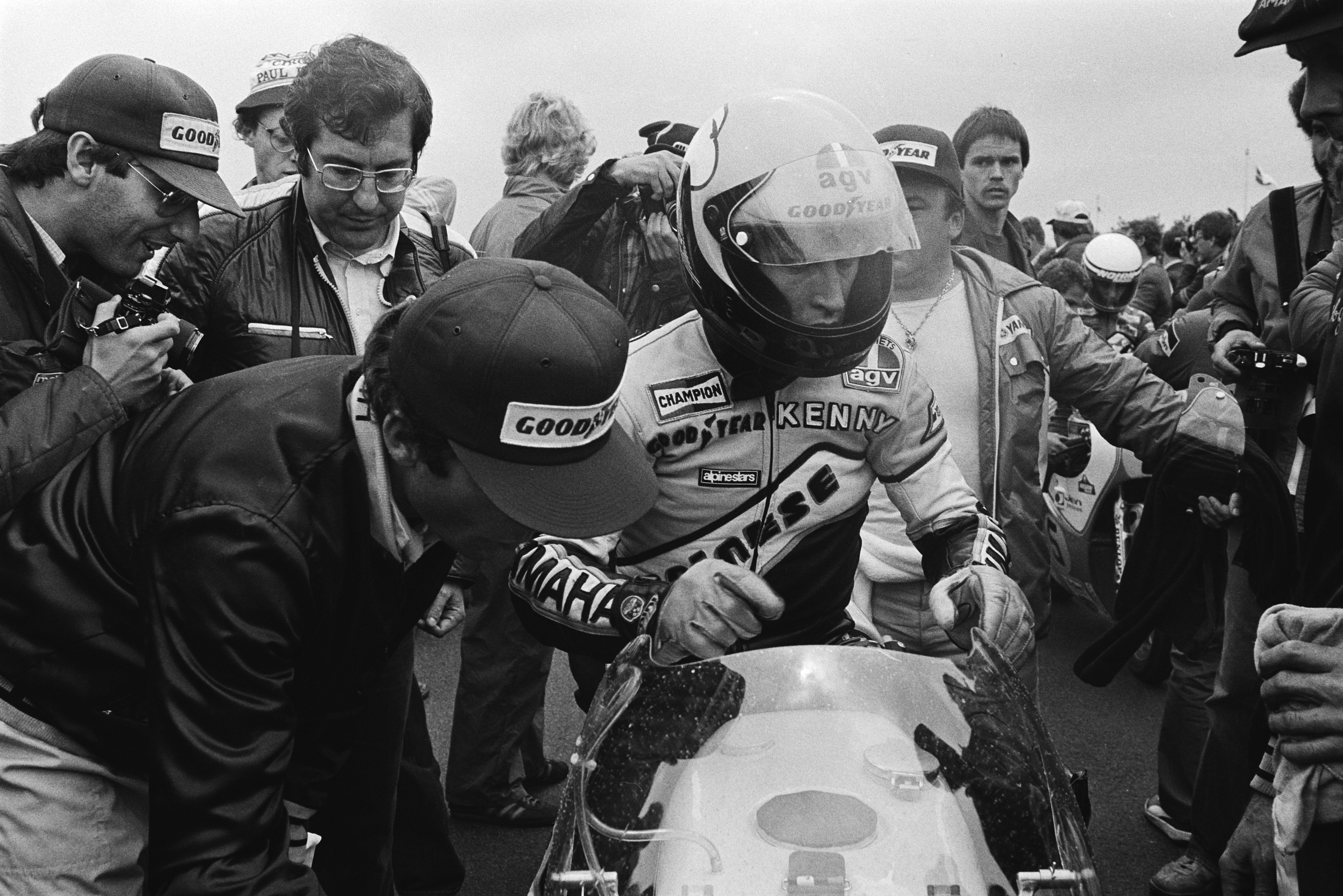
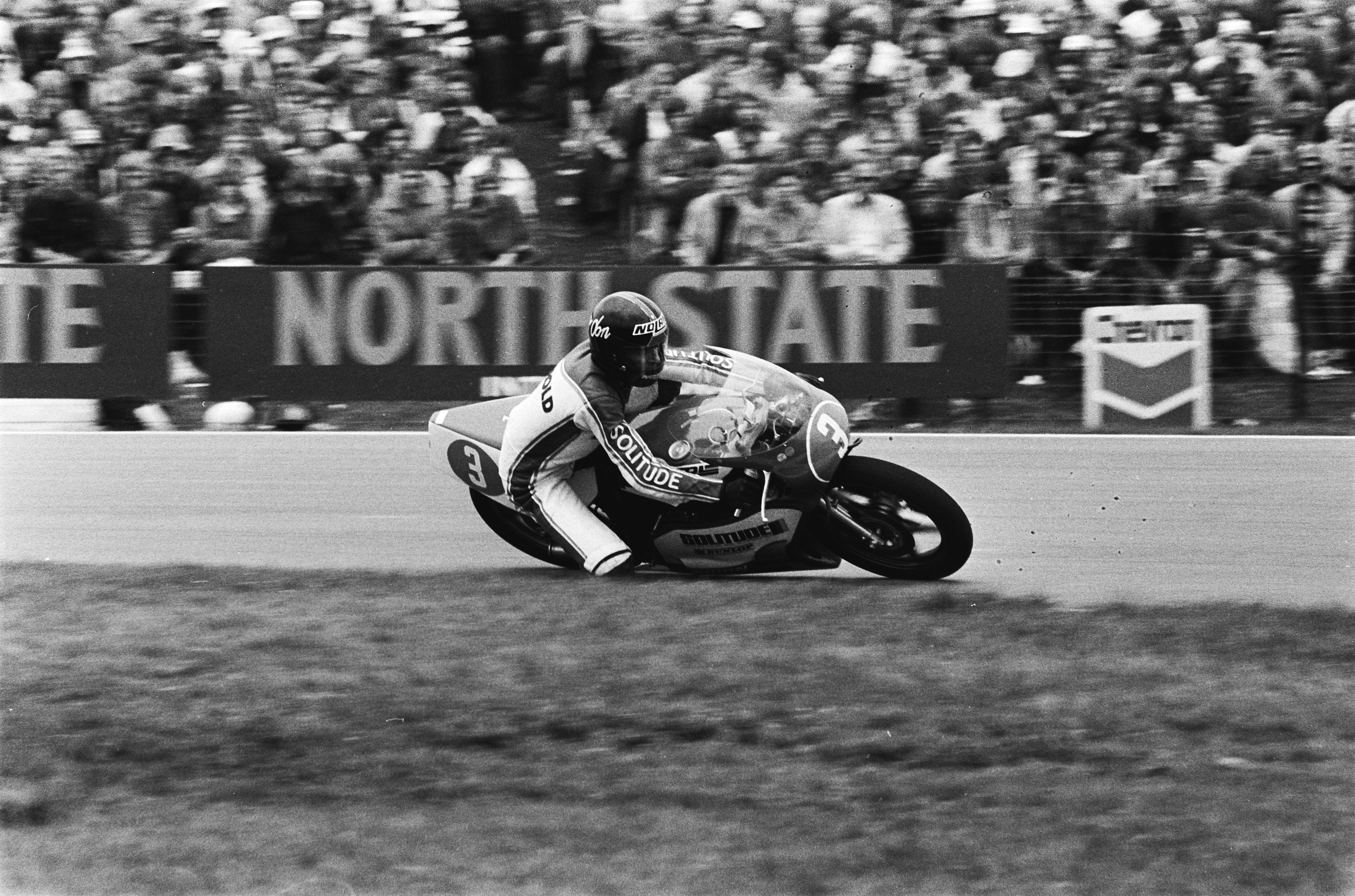
Kenny Roberts (pictured top in Assen) and Jon Ekerold (pictured in Assen) became the 1980 500cc and 350cc world champion.

The 1980 Grand Prix motorcycle racing season was the 32nd F.I.M. Road Racing World Championship season.

== Season summary ==
Yamaha's Kenny Roberts claimed his third successive 500cc world championship in a season shortened by the cancellations of the Venezuelan and Austrian rounds. Randy Mamola took over at Suzuki from Barry Sheene. Kawasaki returned to the 500cc class with a monocoque, four cylinder bike for Kork Ballington. Honda soldiered on with its exotic four-stroke NR500 but began to realize it was at a disadvantage against its two-stroke opposition.

There were only six rounds in the 350cc class that saw South Africa's Jon Ekerold, a true privateer, take the championship from the Kawasaki factory-sponsored Anton Mang. Mang would take the 250cc crown from defending champion Ballington while Pier Paolo Bianchi won the 125cc title. Eugenio Lazzarini won a tight battle from Swiss Stefan Dörflinger to take the 50cc championship by only 2 points.

== 1980 Grand Prix season calendar ==
The following Grands Prix were scheduled to take place in 1980:

Round	Date	Grand Prix	Circuit
1	11 May	(Italy) Gran Premio delle Nazioni	Circuito Internazionale Santa Monica
2	18 May	(Spain) Gran Premio de España	Circuito Permanente Del Jarama
3	25 May	Grand Prix de France Moto	Circuit Paul Ricard
4	15 Jun	(Socialist Federal Republic of Yugoslavia) Velika Nagrada Jugoslavije	Automotodrom Rijeka
5	28 June	(Netherlands) Dutch TT Assen	TT Circuit Assen
6	6 July	Grand Prix of Belgium	Circuit Zolder
7	27 July	(Finland) Finnish GP	Imatra Circuit
8	10 August	(United Kingdom) Marlboro British Grand Prix	Silverstone Circuit
9	17 August	(Czechoslovakia) Grand Prix ČSSR	Brno Circuit
10	24 August	(Germany) Großer Preis von Deutschland	Nürburgring-Nordschleife

=== Calendar changes ===
- The Venezuelan and Swedish Grand Prix was taken off the calendar due to financial problems.
- The Austrian Grand Prix, originally scheduled for April, was eventually cancelled due to snowy conditions on race week. It was the last Grand Prix to have all races cancelled until the 2018 British Grand Prix (although all free practices and qualifying took place).
- The German Grand Prix had its date moved from 6 May to 24 August and the venue was moved from the Hockenheimring to the Nürburgring-Nordschleife.
- The French Grand Prix had its date moved from 2 September to 25 May and the venue was moved from the Bugatti Circuit in Le Mans to the Circuit Paul Ricard.
- The Belgian Grand Prix moved from the Circuit de Spa-Francorchamps to the Circuit Zolder due to problems with the new track last year.

=== 1980 Grand Prix season results ===
Round	Date	Race	Location	50cc winner	125cc winner	250cc winner	350cc winner	500cc winner	Report
1	11 May	(Italy) Nations Grand Prix	Misano	(Italy) Eugenio Lazzarini	(Italy) Pier Paolo Bianchi	(Germany) Anton Mang	(Venezuela) Johnny Cecotto	(United States) Kenny Roberts	Report
2	18 May	(Spain) Spanish Grand Prix	Jarama	(Italy) Eugenio Lazzarini	(Italy) Pier Paolo Bianchi	(South Africa) Kork Ballington		(United States) Kenny Roberts	Report
3	25 May	(France) French Grand Prix	Paul Ricard		(Spain) Angel Nieto	(South Africa) Kork Ballington	(South Africa) Jon Ekerold	(United States) Kenny Roberts	Report
4	15 Jun	(Socialist Federal Republic of Yugoslavia) Yugoslavian Grand Prix	Rijeka	(Spain) Ricardo Tormo	(France) Guy Bertin	(Germany) Anton Mang			Report
5	28 June	(Netherlands) Dutch TT	Assen	(Spain) Ricardo Tormo	(Spain) Angel Nieto	(Venezuela) Carlos Lavado	(South Africa) Jon Ekerold	(Netherlands) Jack Middelburg	Report
6	6 July	(Belgium) Belgian Grand Prix	Zolder	(Switzerland) Stefan Dörflinger	(Spain) Angel Nieto	(Germany) Anton Mang		(United States) Randy Mamola	Report
7	27 July	(Finland) Finnish Grand Prix	Imatra		(Spain) Angel Nieto	(South Africa) Kork Ballington		(Netherlands) Wil Hartog	Report
8	10 August	(United Kingdom) British Grand Prix	Silverstone		(Italy) Loris Reggiani	(South Africa) Kork Ballington	(Germany) Anton Mang	(United States) Randy Mamola	Report
9	17 August	(Czechoslovakia) Czechoslovak Grand Prix	Brno Circuit		(France) Guy Bertin	(Germany) Anton Mang	(Germany) Anton Mang		Report
10	24 August	(Germany) German Grand Prix	Nürburgring	(Switzerland) Stefan Dörflinger	(France) Guy Bertin	(South Africa) Kork Ballington	(South Africa) Jon Ekerold	(Italy) Marco Lucchinelli	Report

== Participants and standings ==
=== 500cc participants ===
Team	Constructor	Motorcycle	No.	Rider	Rounds
Yamaha Motor Japan	Yamaha	Yamaha YZR500 (OW48)	1	(United States) Kenny Roberts	All
Cagiva	Cagiva	Cagiva GP500	2	(Italy) Virginio Ferrari	All
Riemersma Racing	Suzuki	Suzuki RG 500	3; 4	(Netherlands) Wil Hartog	1–2, 4–8
Venemotos Racing Team	Yamaha	Yamaha YZR500 (OW48)	4	(Venezuela) Johnny Cecotto	All
Jen Organs	Suzuki	Suzuki RG 500	5; 57	(Italy) Franco Uncini	1–2, 4–8
Yamaha I.M.N.	Yamaha	???	6	(Netherlands) Boet van Dulmen	All
Yamaha I.M.N.	Yamaha	???	14; 8; 9; 7	(Netherlands) Jack Middelburg	2–8
Team Akai with Texaco	Yamaha	Yamaha YZR500 (OW48)	7	(United Kingdom) Barry Sheene	1–4, 7
Honda International	Honda	Honda NR500**	8; 17; 14; 52	(Japan) Takazumi Katayama	7
Honda International	Honda	Honda NR500**	19 ???	(United Kingdom) Mick Grant	9
Marlboro Frankonia Nava	Suzuki	???	9 ???	(Switzerland) Philippe Coulon	1–2, 5–7
Team Nava Olio Fiat	Suzuki	Suzuki RG 500	2; 10 ???	(Italy) Marco Lucchinelli	All
Team Nava Olio Fiat	Suzuki	Suzuki RG 500	23; 28 ???	(Italy) Graziano Rossi	1–7
Team Kawasaki	Kawasaki	Kawasaki KR500	11 ???	(South Africa) Kork Ballington	1–3, 6–9
Team Kawasaki	Kawasaki	Kawasaki KR500	20 ???	(Australia) Gregg Hansford	8
Team Sonauto Gauloises GPA	Yamaha	Yamaha YZR500 (OW48)	12; 19 ???	(France) Patrick Pons	3–7
Team Sonauto Gauloises GPA	Yamaha	Yamaha YZR500 (OW48)	34	(France) Raymond Roche	1, 3–7
Team Sonauto Gauloises GPA	Yamaha	Yamaha YZR500 (OW48)	7	(France) Christian Sarron	All
Elf Moto Racing Team	Yamaha	Yamaha YZR500 (OW48)	13; 21 ???	(Switzerland) Michel Frutschi	2
Ecurie Sté Pernod	Suzuki	Yamaha YZR500 (OW48)	14; 36 ???	(France) Michel Rougerie	2–4, 6
Ecurie Sté Pernod/Sonauto	Yamaha	Yamaha YZR500 (OW48)	20 ???	(France) Patrick Fernandez	4–6
Texaco Heron Team Suzuki	Suzuki	Suzuki RG 500	10; 15 ???	(United States) Randy Mamola	All
Texaco Heron Team Suzuki	Suzuki	Suzuki RG 500	15; 40 ???	(New Zealand) Graeme Crosby	1–5, 7–8
???	Yamaha	???	18 ???	(Japan) Sadao Asami	1, 3, 5–6, 8
???	Suzuki	???	26 ???	(Switzerland) Sergio Pellandini	1
???	Suzuki	???	27 ???	(France) Christian Estrosi	1
GME Motul GPA	Suzuki	???	28 ???	(France) Bernard Fau	3, 5
Team Naldoni	Yamaha	???	36	(Italy) Maurizio Massimiani	1, 5, 8
Sarome	Suzuki	Suzuki RG 500**	40 ???	(Japan) Hiroshi Aoyama	1–4, 8
MAN 2000	Suzuki	???	44 ???	(Finland) Seppo Rossi	2–3, 6
Team Gattino	Suzuki	???	45 ???	(Italy) Carlo Perugini	1–3, 5–6, 8
Stimorol	Suzuki	???	61 ???	(Netherlands) Willem Zoet	4–5

Key
Regular Rider
Wildcard Rider
Replacement Rider

Notes

- * The 500cc did not participate in rounds 4 and 9 of the championship, the Yugoslav and Czechoslovak GPs.
- ** Katayama raced with the Suzuki for the first four races until the Honda was ready.
- *** Ballington missed some races due to an injury.
- **** Pons was killed in a racing accident at the British GP.

=== 500cc riders' standings ===
Scoring system

Points were awarded to the top ten finishers in each race. A rider has to finish the race to earn points. All races counted towards the final standings.

(key)

Position	1st	2nd	3rd	4th	5th	6th	7th	8th	9th	10th
Points	15	12	10	8	6	5	4	3	2	1

Place	Rider	Team	Machine	NAT (Italy)	ESP (Spain)	FRA (France)	NED (Netherlands)	BEL (Belgium)	FIN (Finland)	GBR (United Kingdom)	GER (Germany)	Points
1	(United States) Kenny Roberts	Yamaha International	YZR500	1	1	1	Ret	3	2	2	4	87
2	(United States) Randy Mamola	Heron-Suzuki	RG500	Ret	3	2	5	1	4	1	5	72
3	(Italy) Marco Lucchinelli	Team Nava Olio Fiat	RG500	Ret	2	3	Ret	2	Ret	3	1	59
4	(Italy) Franco Uncini	Uncini-Suzuki	RG500	2	7	Ret	3	6	3	6	7	50
5	(Italy) Graziano Rossi	Team Nava Olio Fiat	RG500	3	Ret	4	2	Ret	13	4	Ret	38
6	(Netherlands) Wil Hartog	Riemersma Racing	RG500	Ret	Ret		19	5	1	Ret	3	31
7	(Venezuela) Johnny Cecotto	Venemotos-Yamaha	YZR500	4	6	9	6	Ret		5	6	31
8	(New Zealand) Graeme Crosby	Heron-Suzuki	RG500	Ret	12	5	8	4		13	2	29
9	(Netherlands) Jack Middelburg	IMN-Yamaha	YZR500	DNS	15	Ret	1	Ret	Ret	9	8	20
10	(Japan) Takazumi Katayama	Honda-HRC	RG500/NR500	6	4	6	Ret		Ret	15	12	18
11	(Italy) Carlo Perugini	Team Gattina	RG500	5	10	13	Ret	7	7	Ret	9	17
12	(South Africa) Kork Ballington	Team Kawasaki	KR500	Ret	13	8			5	7	11	13
13	(Switzerland) Philippe Coulon	Frankonia-Suzuki	RG500	9	8	16	Ret	11	8	8	Ret	11
14	(Netherlands) Boet Van Dulmen	IMN-Yamaha	YZR500	Ret	18	19	4	9	Ret	16	Ret	10
15	(United Kingdom) Barry Sheene	Akai-Yamaha	YZR500	7	5	Ret	Ret	DNQ		Ret		10
16	(France) Patrick Pons	Sonauto Gauloises-Yamaha	YZR500	Ret	Ret	10	10	8	6	Ret		10
17	(France) Patrick Fernandez	Ecurie Ste Pernod	YZR500	Ret	Ret	Ret	7	Ret	14			4
18	(France) Michel Rougerie	Ecurie Ste Pernod	RG500	DNQ	11	7	14	Ret	15	Ret		4
19	(France) Christian Estrosi	Team Furygan Suzuki	RG500	8	16	Ret	Ret	DNQ	Ret			3
20	(Netherlands) Henk De Vries		RG500				9	DNQ		25		2
21	(Japan) Sadao Asami	Yamaha International	YZR500	Ret	Ret	12	DNQ	15	9	Ret	15	2
22	(Switzerland) Michel Frutschi	Elf-Yamaha	YZR500	Ret	9	22	Ret	DNQ	18	Ret	Ret	2
23	(France) Raymond Roche	Sonauto Gauloises-Yamaha	YZR500	Ret	DNQ	11	DNQ	12	10	14		1
24	(Germany) Gustav Reiner	Nava Kucera Racing Team	RG500	DNQ			DNQ	Ret		22	10	1
25	(France) Bernard Fau	GME Motul GPA	YZR500	Ret	Ret	15		10	Ret	Ret		1
26	(United Kingdom) Dave Potter	Mitsui-Yamaha	YZR500				15	DNQ		10		1
27	(Switzerland) Sergio Pellandini		RG500	10	Ret	21	DNQ	DNQ			Ret	1
	(Italy) Maurizio Massimiani		YZR500	11		23		13			13	0
	(United States) Dale Singleton		YZR500			DNQ	18	Ret		11	16	0
	(France) Franck Gross		RG500			24		Ret	11	DNQ	Ret	0
	(Australia) Jeff Sayle		YZR500	DNQ		DNQ	11	Ret		Ret	Ret	0
	(Netherlands) Willem Zoet		RG500	DNQ		18	12	14	Ret	19	Ret	0
	(Italy) Gianfranco Bonera		YZR500	12		17		Ret				0
	(Sweden) Lennart Bäckström		RG500						12			0
	(United Kingdom) John Newbold		RG500							12		0
	(Finland) Markku Matikainen		YZR500	DNQ	19	20	13	Ret	DNQ			0
	(Italy) Guido Paci		RG500	13		Ret						0
	(Finland) Seppo Rossi		RG500	DNQ	14	14		16	Ret	Ret	23	0
	(New Zealand) Stuart Avant		RG500					DNQ		Ret	14	0
	(Belgium) Richard Hubin		YZR500	14	Ret							0
	(Austria) Werner Nenning		RG500	DNQ	Ret	DNQ	Ret		16	23	18	0
	(United Kingdom) Mick Grant		RG500				16		Ret	DNQ		0
	(United Kingdom) Steve Parrish		RG500				17	DNQ		17	17	0
	(France) Hubert Rigal		YZR500	DNQ	17	Ret	Ret	DNQ	17	Ret		0
	(Australia) Kenny Blake		YZR500					17				0
	(United Kingdom) Roger Marshall		YZR500							18		0
	(Austria) Max Wiener		RG500	DNQ		DNQ	DNQ		19		25	0
	(Germany) Josef Hage		RG500				DNQ	DNQ			19	0
	(Sweden) Peter Sjöström		RG500		DNQ	DNQ		DNQ	Ret	20		0
	(Germany) Peter Ammann		RG500								20	0
	(Italy) Giovanni Pelletier		Morbidelli	Ret	DNQ	DNQ		DNQ			21	0
	(United Kingdom) Paul Henderson		RG500							21		0
	(Switzerland) Wolfgang von Muralt		YZR500								22	0
	(Germany) Gerhard Vogt		RG500							24		0
	(Germany) Jürgen Steiner		RG500								24	0
	(Austria) Michael Schmid		RG500			DNQ					26	0
	(Germany) Alois Tost		YZR500								27	0
	(Germany) Bruno Kölble		YZR500								28	0
	(Germany) Rolf Schneider		YZR500								29	0
	(France) Christian Sarron		YZR500	Ret	Ret							0
	(Italy) Gianni Rolando		RG500	Ret	Ret	DNQ				Ret		0
	(Italy) Carlo Prati		RG500	Ret				DNQ			Ret	0
	(South Africa) Jon Ekerold		Sol/Bimota	DNQ		DNQ	Ret			DNS	DNS	0
	(United States) Skip Aksland		YZR500		Ret							0
	(Belgium) Alain Nies		RG500			DNQ		Ret		DNQ		0
	(United States) Freddie Spencer		YZR500					Ret				0
	(Italy) Adelio Faccioli		RG500						Ret			0
	(Germany) Anton Mang		KR500						Ret			0
	(Sweden) Peter Sköld		RG500						Ret			0
	(Finland) Kimmo Kopra		YZR500						Ret			0
	(United Kingdom) Graham Wood		YZR500							Ret		0
	(United Kingdom) Steve Manship		YZR500							Ret		0
	(Germany) Elmar Renner		RG500		DNQ	DNQ					Ret	0
	(Australia) Gregg Hansford		KR500								Ret	0
	(Germany) Klaus Klein		RG500								Ret	0
	(Italy) Virginio Ferrari		GP500								Ret	0
	(Germany) Clemens Driesch		RG500								Ret	0
	(Germany) Fritz Reitmaier		RG500								Ret	0

=== 350cc standings ===
Place	Rider	Number	Country	Machine	Points	Wins
1	(South Africa) Jon Ekerold	8	South Africa	Yamaha	63	3
2	(West Germany) Anton Mang	4	West Germany	Kawasaki	60	2
3	(France) Jean-François Baldé		France	Kawasaki	38	0
4	(Venezuela) Johnny Cecotto		Venezuela	Yamaha	37	1
5	(Australia) Jeff Sayle	10	Australia	Yamaha	25	0
6	(France) Eric Saul		France	Yamaha	24	0
7	(Switzerland) Jacques Cornu	27	Switzerland	Yamaha	21	0
8	(Italy) Massimo Matteoni	4	Italy	Yamaha	19	0
9	(Italy) Walter Villa	4	Italy	Yamaha	16	0
10	(France) Patrick Fernandez	2	France	Yamaha	12	0
11	Carlo Perugini				10	
12	Tony Head				9	
13	Carlos Lavado				8	
14	Roland Freymond				7	
15	Gregg Hansford				6	
16	Tony Rogers				6	
17	Jacques Bolle				6	
18	Keith Huewen				6	
19	Thierry Espié				6	
20	Jean-Louis Tournadre				5	
21	Loris Reggiani				4	
22	Graeme McGregor				4	
23	Alan North				2	
24	Pekka Nurmi				1	
25	Edi Stoellinger				1	

=== 250cc standings ===
Place	Rider	Number	Country	Machine	Points	Wins
1	(West Germany) Anton Mang	6	West Germany	Kawasaki	128	4
2	(South Africa) Kork Ballington	1	South Africa	Kawasaki	87	5
3	(France) Jean-François Baldé	8	France	Kawasaki	59	0
4	(France) Thierry Espié		France	Yamaha	53	0
5	(Switzerland) Roland Freymond	10	Switzerland	Morbidelli	46	0
6	(Venezuela) Carlos Lavado		Venezuela	Yamaha	29	1
7	(Italy) Gianpaolo Marchetti		Italy	Yamaha	28	0
8	(Switzerland) Jacques Cornu		Switzerland	Yamaha	26	0
9	(France) Eric Saul		France	Yamaha	24	0
10	(France) Patrick Fernandez	5	France	Yamaha	16	0
11	Edi Stoellinger				16	
12	Hans Müller				16	
13	Sauro Pazzaglia				12	
14	Graeme McGregor				12	
15	Pier Luigi Conforti				10	
16	Jean-Louis Guignabodet				9	
17	Didier de Radiguès				8	
18	Eero Hyvärinen				8	
19	Clive Horton				7	
20	Paolo Ferretti				7	
21	Greame Geddes				6	
22	R.Sibille				6	
23	Steve Tonkin				5	
24	Jacques Bolle				5	
25	Herbert Hauf				4	
26	A.Gouin				4	
27	Reinhold Roth				4	
28	Walter Villa				4	
29	Charlie Williams				2	
30	Martin Wimmer				2	
31	Marco Papa				1	
32	Jean-Louis Tournadre				1	
33	Rene Delaby				1	
34	F.Marcheggiani				1	
35	Tony Rogers				1	
36	H.Tomic				1	

=== 125cc standings ===
Place	Rider	Number	Country	Machine	Points	Wins
1	(Italy) Pier Paolo Bianchi	10	Italy	MBA	90	2
2	(France) Guy Bertin	6	France	Motobécane	81	3
3	(Spain) Angel Nieto	1	Spain	Minarelli	78	4
4	(Switzerland) Bruno Kneubühler	9	Switzerland	MBA	68	0
5	(Switzerland) Hans Müller		Switzerland	MBA	64	0
6	(Italy) Loris Reggiani		Italy	Minarelli	63	1
7	(Venezuela) Iván Palazzese		Venezuela	MBA	28	0
8	(Italy) Maurizio Massimiani	2	Italy	Minarelli	20	0
9	(Netherlands) Peter Looijensteijn		Netherlands	MBA	18	0
10	(Australia) Barry Smith		Australia	MBA	17	0
11	Harald Bartol				15	
12	Ricardo Tormo				13	
13	Stefan Dörflinger				13	
14	Gianpaolo Marchetti				10	
15	August Auinger				9	
16	Jose Dubon				8	
17	Eugenio Lazzarini				8	
18	Rolf Blatter				8	
19	Henk Van Kessel				8	
20	Gert Bender				6	
21	Michel Galbit				6	
22	P.Herouard				6	
23	Janos Drapal				5	
24	Thierry Noblesse				4	
25	Matti Kinnunen				4	
26	Jhonni Baeckstroem				2	
27	S.Janssen				2	
28	Jean Claude Selini				2	
29	Johnny Wickstroem				1	
30	Hugo Vignetti				1	
31	Z.Ljeljak				1	
32	Anton Straver				1	

=== 50cc standings ===
Place	Rider	Number	Country	Machine	Points	Wins
1	(Italy) Eugenio Lazzarini	1	Italy	Iprem	74	2
2	(Switzerland) Stefan Dörflinger	10	Switzerland	Kreidler	72	2
3	(Austria) Hans Hummel		Austria	Kreidler	37	0
4	(Spain) Ricardo Tormo		Spain	Kreidler	36	2
5	(Netherlands) Henk van Kessel	7	Netherlands	Kreidler	31	0
6	(Netherlands) Hans Spaan		Netherlands	Kreidler The Best Team	24	0
7	(Netherlands) Theo Timmer		Netherlands	Bultaco	19	0
8	(France) Yves Dupont		France	ABF	18	0
9	(France) Jacques Hutteau	8	France	ABF	18	0
10	(West Germany) Wolfgang Müller		West Germany	Kreidler	15	0
11	(Switzerland) Rolf Blatter				14	
12	(West Germany) Gerhard Waibel				7	
13	(Austria) Otto Machinek				7	
14	(West Germany) Ingo Emmerich				6	
15	(Italy) Giuseppe Ascareggi				4	
16	(West Germany) Günter Schirnhofer				4	
17	(Spain) Daniel Mateos				3	
18	(Italy) Claudio Lusuardi				3	
19	(Italy) Enrico Cereda				2	
20	(Italy) Aldo Pero				1	
21	(West Germany) Gerhard Böhl				1	
