= 1981 Swedish motorcycle Grand Prix =

(Sweden) 1981 Swedish Grand Prix
Race details
- Race 13 of 14 races in the 1981 Grand Prix motorcycle racing season
- Date: 16 August 1981
- Official name: Swedish TT
- Location: Scandinavian Raceway
- Course: Permanent racing facility; 4.031 km (2.505 mi)

500cc
Pole position
- Rider: (United Kingdom) Barry Sheene
- Time: 1:39.542
Fastest lap
- Rider: (United Kingdom) Barry Sheene
- Time: 1:43.000
Podium
- First: (United Kingdom) Barry Sheene
- Second: (Netherlands) Boet van Dulmen
- Third: (Netherlands) Jack Middelburg

350cc
Pole position
- Rider: No 350cc race was held
Fastest lap
- Rider: No 350cc race was held
Podium
- First: No 350cc race was held
- Second: No 350cc race was held
- Third: No 350cc race was held

250cc
Pole position
- Rider: Unknown
Fastest lap
- Rider: Unknown
Podium
- First: (West Germany) Anton Mang
- Second: (Switzerland) Roland Freymond
- Third: (France) Jean-François Baldé

125cc
Pole position
- Rider: Unknown
Fastest lap
- Rider: Unknown
Podium
- First: (Spain) Ricardo Tormo
- Second: (France) Guy Bertin
- Third: (Venezuela) Iván Palazzese

50cc
Pole position
- Rider: No 50cc race was held
Fastest lap
- Rider: No 50cc race was held
Podium
- First: No 50cc race was held
- Second: No 50cc race was held
- Third: No 50cc race was held

The 1981 Swedish motorcycle Grand Prix was the thirteenth round of the 1981 Grand Prix motorcycle racing season. It took place on the weekend of 14–16 August 1981 at the Scandinavian Raceway in Anderstorp, Sweden.

This would prove to be 2-time 500cc world champion Barry Sheene's last victory in the premier class, as well as his 7th Anderstorp victory, a record he still holds as of 2022.

== Classification ==
=== 500 cc ===
Pos.	Rider	Team	Manufacturer	Time/Retired	Points
1	(United Kingdom) Barry Sheene		Yamaha	55'24.040	15
2	(Netherlands) Boet van Dulmen		Yamaha	+0.821	12
3	(Netherlands) Jack Middelburg	Racing Westland	Suzuki	+38.519	10
4	(South Africa) Kork Ballington	Team Kawasaki	Kawasaki	+50.487	8
5	(New Zealand) Graeme Crosby	Ingersoll Heron Team Suzuki	Suzuki	+51.287	6
6	(France) Marc Fontan	Team Sonauto Gauloises	Yamaha	+56.103	5
7	(Italy) Franco Uncini		Suzuki	+56.426	4
8	(Finland) Seppo Rossi		Suzuki	+57.025	3
9	(Italy) Marco Lucchinelli	Team Nava Suzuki	Suzuki	+1'20.487	2
10	(France) Bernard Fau		Yamaha	+1'24.921	1
11	(Italy) Graziano Rossi	Morbidelli	Morbidelli	+1 lap	
12	(Sweden) Lars Johansson		Suzuki	+1 lap	
13	(United States) Randy Mamola	Ingersoll Heron Team Suzuki	Suzuki	+1 lap	
14	(Denmark) Børge Nielsen		Suzuki	+1 lap	
15	(United Kingdom) Steve Parrish	Team Mitsui Yamaha	Yamaha	+1 lap	
16	(Switzerland) Sergio Pellandini		Suzuki	+1 lap	
17	(Switzerland) Philippe Coulon		Suzuki	+1 lap	
18	(Finland) Kimmo Kopra		Suzuki	+1 lap	
19	(Sweden) Ake Grahn	Hallman & Eneqvist Motor	Yamaha	+1 lap	
20	(Switzerland) Alain Rothlisberger		Suzuki	+1 lap	
21	(Sweden) Peter Sköld		Suzuki	+1 lap	
22	(Sweden) Peter Sjöström		Suzuki	+1 lap	
Ret	(United States) Kenny Roberts	Yamaha Motor Company	Yamaha	Retired	
Ret	(Switzerland) Michel Frutschi	Elf Motor Racing Team	Yamaha	Retired	
Ret	(Italy) Gianni Pelletier		Suzuki	Retired	
Ret	(France) Christian Sarron	Team Sonauto Gauloises	Yamaha	Retired	
Ret	(Japan) Sadao Asami		Yamaha	Retired	
Ret	(Italy) Guido Paci		Yamaha	Accident	
Ret	(Norway) Bengt Slydal		Suzuki	Retired	
Ret	(Italy) Gianni Rolando		Lombardini	Retired	

Previous race: 1981 Finnish Grand Prix	FIM Grand Prix World Championship; 1981 season	Next race: 1981 Czechoslovak Grand Prix
Previous race: 1979 Swedish Grand Prix	Swedish Grand Prix	Next race: 1982 Swedish Grand Prix
