= 1981 San Marino motorcycle Grand Prix =

1981 San Marino Grand Prix
Race details
- Race 10 of 14 races in the 1981 Grand Prix motorcycle racing season
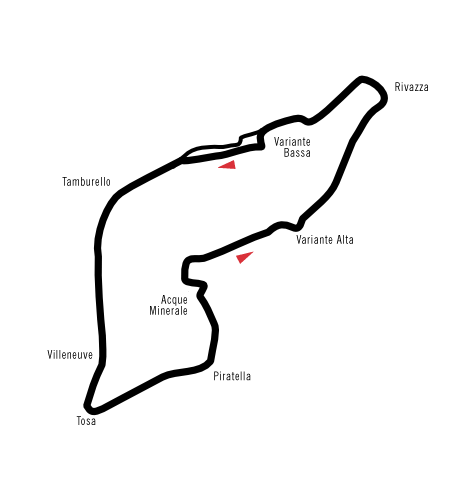
- Date: 12 July 1981
- Official name: Gran Premio di San Marino
- Location: Autodromo Dino Ferrari
- Course: Permanent racing facility; 4.933 km (3.065 mi)

500cc
Pole position
- Rider: (Italy) Marco Lucchinelli
- Time: 1:56.300
Fastest lap
- Rider: (United Kingdom) Barry Sheene
- Time: 1:57.640
Podium
- First: (Italy) Marco Lucchinelli
- Second: (United Kingdom) Barry Sheene
- Third: (New Zealand) Graeme Crosby

350cc
Pole position
- Rider: No 350cc race was held
Fastest lap
- Rider: No 350cc race was held
Podium
- First: No 350cc race was held
- Second: No 350cc race was held
- Third: No 350cc race was held

250cc
Pole position
- Rider: (West Germany) Anton Mang
- Time: 2:01.980
Fastest lap
- Rider: (West Germany) Anton Mang
- Time: 2:03.130
Podium
- First: (West Germany) Anton Mang
- Second: (Switzerland) Roland Freymond
- Third: (France) Jean-François Baldé

125cc
Pole position
- Rider: (Italy) Loris Reggiani
- Time: 2:09.300
Fastest lap
- Rider: (Spain) Ángel Nieto
- Time: 2:09.320
Podium
- First: (Italy) Loris Reggiani
- Second: (Spain) Ángel Nieto
- Third: (Italy) Pier Paolo Bianchi

50cc
Pole position
- Rider: (Spain) Ricardo Tormo
- Time: 2:23.830
Fastest lap
- Rider: (Spain) Ricardo Tormo
Podium
- First: (Spain) Ricardo Tormo
- Second: (Netherlands) Henk van Kessel
- Third: (Netherlands) Theo Timmer

The 1981 San Marino motorcycle Grand Prix was the tenth race of the 1981 Grand Prix motorcycle racing season. It took place on the weekend of 10-12 July 1981 at the Autodromo Dino Ferrari.

== Classification ==
=== 500 cc ===
Pos.	Rider	Team	Manufacturer	Time/Retired	Points
1	(Italy) Marco Lucchinelli	Team Nava Suzuki	Suzuki	42'19.980	15
2	(United Kingdom) Barry Sheene		Yamaha	+3.310	12
3	(New Zealand) Graeme Crosby	Ingersoll Herin Team Suzuki	Suzuki	+6.460	10
4	(United States) Randy Mamola	Ingersoll Herin Team Suzuki	Suzuki	+44.780	8
5	(South Africa) Kork Ballington	Team Kawasaki	Kawasaki	+1'12.190	6
6	(Italy) Guido Paci		Yamaha	+1'21.280	5
7	(Netherlands) Jack Middelburg	Racing Westland	Suzuki	+1'22.720	4
8	(France) Marc Fontan	Team Sonauto Gauloises	+1'22.850	3	
9	(Italy) Gianni Pelletier		Suzuki	+1'27.380	2
10	(United Kingdom) Keith Huewen	Heron Suzuki GB	Suzuki	+1'35.230	1
11	(Switzerland) Sergio Pellandini		Suzuki	+1'43.040	
12	(France) Christian Sarron	Team Sonauto Gauloises	Yamaha	+2'07.320	
13	(Italy) Walter Migliorati		Suzuki	+2'21.660	
14	(Finland) Seppo Rossi		Suzuki	+2'22.680	
15	(Finland) Kimmo Kopra		Suzuki	+1 lap	
16	(Switzerland) Michel Frutschi	Elf Motor Racing Team	Yamaha	+1 lap	
17	(Italy) Fabio Biliotti		Suzuki	+1 lap	
18	(Italy) Raffaele Pasqual		Yamaha	+1 lap	
19	(Italy) Virginio Ferrari	Cagiva Corse	Cagiva	+1 lap	
Ret	(Italy) Carlo Perugini	Moto Sanvenero	Sanvenero	Retired	
Ret	(Italy) Gianni Rolando		Lombardini	Retired	
Ret	(France) Bernard Fau		Yamaha	Retired	
Ret	(Netherlands) Boet van Dulmen		Yamaha	Retired	
Ret	(Denmark) Børge Nielsen		Suzuki	Retired	
Ret	(France) Christian Estrosi		Suzuki	Retired	
Ret	(Italy) Franco Uncini		Suzuki	Retired	
Ret	(Switzerland) Philippe Coulon		Suzuki	Retired	
Ret	(Japan) Sadao Asami		Yamaha	Retired	
Ret	(United Kingdom) Steve Parrish	Team Mitsui Yamaha	Yamaha	Retired	
Ret	(Netherlands) Willem Zoet	Stimorol Racing	Suzuki	Retired	
DNS	(United States) Kenny Roberts	Yamaha Motor Company	Yamaha	Did not start	
DNQ	(Sweden) Peter Sjöström		Suzuki	Did not qualify	
DNQ	(Austria) Michael Schmid		Suzuki	Did not qualify	
DNQ	(Switzerland) Alain Rothlisberger		Suzuki	Did not qualify	
DNQ	(West Germany) Josef Hage	Dieter Braun Team	Yamaha	Did not qualify	
DNQ	(Switzerland) Wolfgang von Muralt		Yamaha	Did not qualify	
DNQ	(Italy) Antonio Grecco		Suzuki	Did not qualify	

Previous race: 1981 Belgian Grand Prix	FIM Grand Prix World Championship; 1981 season	Next race: 1981 British Grand Prix
Previous race: None	San Marino Grand Prix	Next race: 1982 San Marino Grand Prix
