= 1981 Belgian motorcycle Grand Prix =

(Belgium) 1981 Belgian Grand Prix
Race details
- Race 9 of 14 races in the 1981 Grand Prix motorcycle racing season
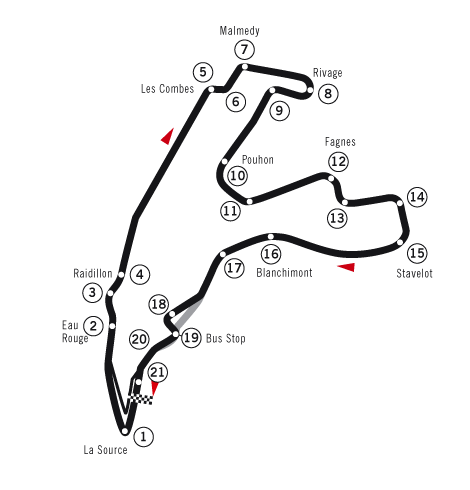
- Date: 5 July 1981
- Official name: Grand Prix Moto
- Location: Circuit de Spa-Francorchamps
- Course: Permanent racing facility; 6.940 km (4.312 mi)

500cc
Pole position
- Rider: (Italy) Marco Lucchinelli
- Time: 2:38.680
Fastest lap
- Rider: (Italy) Marco Lucchinelli
- Time: 2:38.040
Podium
- First: (Italy) Marco Lucchinelli
- Second: (United States) Kenny Roberts
- Third: (United States) Randy Mamola

350cc
Pole position
- Rider: No 350cc race was held
Fastest lap
- Rider: No 350cc race was held
Podium
- First: No 350cc race was held
- Second: No 350cc race was held
- Third: No 350cc race was held

250cc
Pole position
- Rider: (West Germany) Anton Mang
- Time: 2:50.110
Fastest lap
- Rider: Unknown
Podium
- First: (West Germany) Anton Mang
- Second: (Venezuela) Carlos Lavado
- Third: (France) Jean-François Baldé

125cc
Pole position
- Rider: No 125cc race was held
Fastest lap
- Rider: No 125cc race was held
Podium
- First: No 125cc race was held
- Second: No 125cc race was held
- Third: No 125cc race was held

50cc
Pole position
- Rider: (Spain) Ricardo Tormo
- Time: 3:15.420
Fastest lap
- Rider: Unknown
Podium
- First: (Spain) Ricardo Tormo
- Second: (Netherlands) Henk van Kessel
- Third: (Netherlands) Theo Timmer

The 1981 Belgian motorcycle Grand Prix was the ninth round of the 1981 Grand Prix motorcycle racing season. It took place on the weekend of 3–5 July 1981 at the Circuit de Spa-Francorchamps.

== Classification ==
=== 500 cc ===
Pos.	Rider	Team	Manufacturer	Time/Retired	Points
1	(Italy) Marco Lucchinelli	Team Nava Suzuki	Suzuki	54'29.370	15
2	(United States) Kenny Roberts	Yamaha Motor Company	Yamaha	+0.530	12
3	(United States) Randy Mamola	Ingersoll Herin Team Suzuki	Suzuki	+16.930	10
4	(United Kingdom) Barry Sheene		Yamaha	+18.170	8
5	(Netherlands) Boet van Dulmen		Yamaha	+41.490	6
6	(Netherlands) Jack Middelburg	Racing Westland	Suzuki	+1 lap	5
7	(New Zealand) Graeme Crosby	Ingersoll Herin Team Suzuki	Suzuki	+1 lap	4
8	(France) Marc Fontan	Team Sonauto Gauloises	Yamaha	+1 lap	3
9	(Netherlands) Willem Zoet	Stimorol Racing	Suzuki	+1 lap	2
10	(France) Bernard Fau		Yamaha	+1 lap	1
11	(Japan) Sadao Asami		Yamaha	+1 lap	
12	(Italy) Guido Paci		Yamaha	+1 lap	
13	(United Kingdom) Keith Huewen	Heron Suzuki GB	Suzuki	+1 lap	
14	(United States) Dale Singleton	Beaulieu Racing	Suzuki	+1 lap	
15	(Switzerland) Sergio Pellandini		Suzuki	+1 lap	
16	(Italy) Gianni Pelletier	Morbidelli	Morbidelli	+1 lap	
17	(Finland) Seppo Rossi		Suzuki	+1 lap	
18	(France) Dominique Pernet		Yamaha	+1 lap	
19	(South Africa) Kork Ballington	Team Kawasaki	Kawasaki	+1 lap	
20	(United Kingdom) Steve Parrish	Team Mitsui Yamaha	Yamaha	+1 lap	
21	(Denmark) Børge Nielsen		Suzuki	+1 lap	
22	(New Zealand) Stuart Avant	Ellis Racing	Suzuki	+1 lap	
23	(Switzerland) Michel Frutschi	Elf Motor Racing Team	Yamaha	+1 lap	
24	(Belgium) Philippe Chaltin		Suzuki	+1 lap	
25	(New Zealand) Dennis Ireland		Suzuki	+1 lap	
26	(United Kingdom) Dave Potter		Yamaha	+1 lap	
27	(Switzerland) Philippe Coulon		Suzuki	+1 lap	
28	(United Kingdom) Gary Lingham		Suzuki	+1 lap	
29	(France) Christian Estrosi		Suzuki	+1 lap	
Ret	(Australia) Gregg Hansford	Team Kawasaki Australia	Kawasaki	Retired	
Ret	(Finland) Kimmo Kopra		Suzuki	Retired	
Ret	(France) Christian Sarron	Team Sonauto Gauloises	Yamaha	Retired	
Ret	(Italy) Franco Uncini		Suzuki	Retired	
Ret	(Sweden) Peter Sjöström		Suzuki	Retired	
Ret	(Italy) Graziano Rossi	Morbidelli	Morbidelli	Retired	
Ret	(France) Franck Gross		Suzuki	Retired	

Previous race: 1981 Dutch TT	FIM Grand Prix World Championship; 1981 season	Next race: 1981 San Marino Grand Prix
Previous race: 1980 Belgian Grand Prix	Belgian Grand Prix	Next race: 1982 Belgian Grand Prix
