= 1981 French motorcycle Grand Prix =

(France) 1981 French Grand Prix
Race details
- Race 5 of 14 races in the 1981 Grand Prix motorcycle racing season
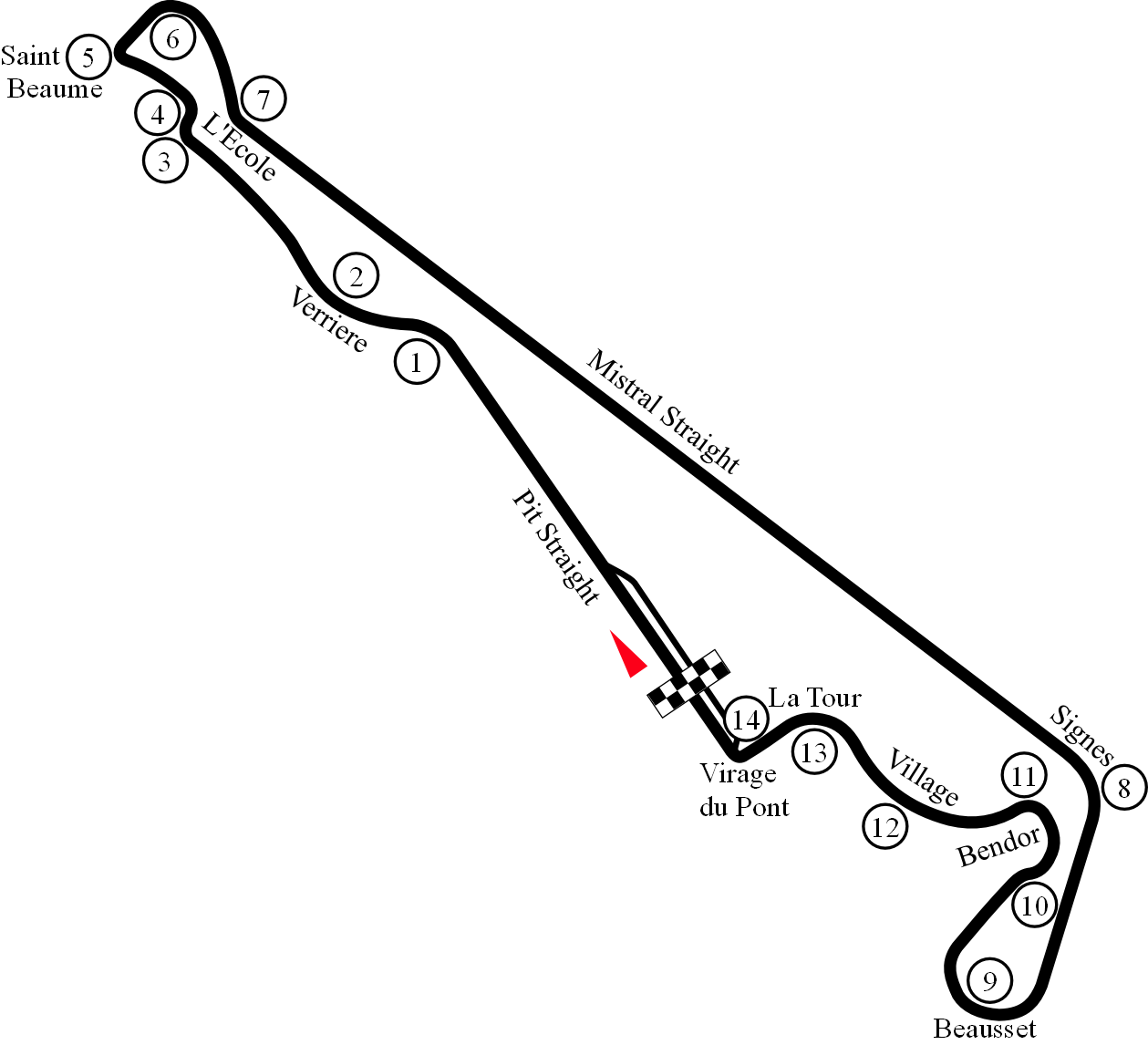
- Date: 17 May 1981
- Official name: Grand Prix de France Moto
- Location: Circuit Paul Ricard
- Course: Permanent racing facility; 5.809 km (3.610 mi)

500cc
Pole position
- Rider: (Italy) Marco Lucchinelli
- Time: 2:04.270
Fastest lap
- Rider: (Italy) Marco Lucchinelli
- Time: 2:04.510
Podium
- First: (Italy) Marco Lucchinelli
- Second: (United States) Randy Mamola
- Third: (New Zealand) Graeme Crosby

350cc
Pole position
- Rider: No 350cc race was held
Fastest lap
- Rider: No 350cc race was held
Podium
- First: No 350cc race was held
- Second: No 350cc race was held
- Third: No 350cc race was held

250cc
Pole position
- Rider: (West Germany) Anton Mang
- Time: 2:12.620
Fastest lap
- Rider: (France) Thierry Espié
- Time: 2:11.920
Podium
- First: (West Germany) Anton Mang
- Second: (France) Thierry Espié
- Third: (Venezuela) Carlos Lavado

125cc
Pole position
- Rider: (France) Guy Bertin
- Time: 2:19.370
Fastest lap
- Rider: (Spain) Ángel Nieto
- Time: 2:18.870
Podium
- First: (Spain) Ángel Nieto
- Second: (France) Guy Bertin
- Third: (Italy) Pier Paolo Bianchi

50cc
Pole position
- Rider: No 50cc race was held
Fastest lap
- Rider: No 50cc race was held
Podium
- First: No 50cc race was held
- Second: No 50cc race was held
- Third: No 50cc race was held

The 1981 French motorcycle Grand Prix was the fifth round of the 1981 Grand Prix motorcycle racing season. It took place on the weekend of 16–17 May 1981 at the Paul Ricard Circuit.

== Classification ==
=== 500 cc ===
Pos.	Rider	Team	Manufacturer	Time/Retired	Points
1	(Italy) Marco Lucchinelli	Team Nava Suzuki	Suzuki	44'09.580	15
2	(United States) Randy Mamola	Ingersoll Herin Team Suzuki	Suzuki	+4.910	12
3	(New Zealand) Graeme Crosby	Ingersoll Herin Team Suzuki	Suzuki	+5.350	10
4	(United Kingdom) Barry Sheene		Yamaha	+5.630	8
5	(United States) Kenny Roberts	Yamaha Motor Company	Yamaha	+13.950	6
6	(Japan) Hiroyuki Kawasaki	Ingersoll Herin Team Suzuki	Suzuki	+30.090	5
7	(South Africa) Kork Ballington	Team Kawasaki	Kawasaki	+30.340	4
8	(Netherlands) Boet van Dulmen		Yamaha	+30.980	3
9	(Netherlands) Jack Middelburg	Racing Westland	Suzuki	+40.510	2
10	(France) Marc Fontan	Team Sonauto Gauloises	Yamaha	+1'05.000	1
11	(Finland) Seppo Rossi		Suzuki	+1'09.540	
12	(France) Bernard Fau		Yamaha	+1'10.000	
13	(Switzerland) Sergio Pellandini		Suzuki	+1'19.030	
14	(Finland) Kimmo Kopra		Suzuki	+1'38.520	
15	(Italy) Walter Migliorati		Suzuki	+1'40.270	
16	(New Zealand) Stuart Avant	Ellis Racing	Suzuki	+1'45.800	
17	(France) Jean Lafond		Yamaha	+1'50.830	
18	(France) Jacques Agopian		Suzuki	+1 lap	
19	(France) Dominique Pernet		Yamaha	+1 lap	
20	(Switzerland) Andreas Hofmann		Suzuki	+1 lap	
21	(Venezuela) Roberto Pietri		Suzuki	+1 lap	
22	(Switzerland) Alain Rothlisberger		Suzuki	+1 lap	
23	(West Germany) Josef Hage	Dieter Braun Team	Yamaha	+1 lap	
24	(Italy) Antonio Grecco		Suzuki	+1 lap	
Ret	(Japan) Takazumi Katayama	Honda International Racing	Honda	Accident	
Ret	(France) Christian Sarron	Team Sonauto Gauloises	Yamaha	Accident	
Ret	(France) Hervé Guilleux		Yamaha	Accident	
Ret	(Sweden) Peter Sjöström		Suzuki	Retired	
Ret	(United States) Mike Baldwin		Yamaha	Retired	
Ret	(Japan) Sadao Asami		Yamaha	Retired	
Ret	(West Germany) Gustav Reiner	Team Solitude Deutschland	Solo	Retired	
Ret	(United Kingdom) Keith Huewen	Heron Suzuki GB	Suzuki	Retired	
Ret	(Italy) Franco Uncini		Suzuki	Retired	
Ret	(France) Christian Estrosi		Suzuki	Retired	
Ret	(Italy) Gianni Rolando		Lombardini	Retired	
Ret	(Switzerland) Philippe Coulon		Suzuki	Retired	
Ret	(France) Raymond Roche		Suzuki	Retired	
DNS	(France) Hubert Rigal		Yamaha	Did not start	
DNQ	(Italy) Carlo Perugini	Moto Sanvenero	Sanvenero	Did not qualify	
DNQ	(Sweden) Lennart Bäckström		Suzuki	Did not qualify	
DNQ	(France) Franck Gross		Suzuki	Did not qualify	
DNQ	(Australia) Virginio Ferrari	Cagiva Corse	Cagiva	Did not qualify	
DNQ	(Italy) Raffaele Pasqual		Yamaha	Did not qualify	
DNQ	(United States) Gina Bovaird		Yamaha	Did not qualify	

Previous race: 1981 Nations Grand Prix	FIM Grand Prix World Championship; 1981 season	Next race: 1981 Spanish Grand Prix
Previous race: 1980 French Grand Prix	French Grand Prix	Next race: 1982 French Grand Prix
