= 1981 Austrian motorcycle Grand Prix =

(Austria) 1981 Austrian Grand Prix
Race details
- Race 2 of 14 races in the 1981 Grand Prix motorcycle racing season
- Date: April 26 1981
- Official name: Großer Preis von Österreich
- Location: Salzburgring
- Course: Permanent racing facility; 4.246 km (2.638 mi)

500cc
Pole position
- Rider: (New Zealand) Graeme Crosby
- Time: 1:20.790
Fastest lap
- Rider: (United States) Randy Mamola
- Time: 1:20.740
Podium
- First: (United States) Randy Mamola
- Second: (New Zealand) Graeme Crosby
- Third: (Japan) Hiroyuki Kawasaki

350cc
Pole position
- Rider: (West Germany) Anton Mang
- Time: 1:24.290
Fastest lap
- Rider: Unknown
Podium
- First: (France) Patrick Fernandez
- Second: (West Germany) Anton Mang
- Third: (South Africa) Jon Ekerold

250cc
Pole position
- Rider: No 250cc race was held
Fastest lap
- Rider: No 250cc race was held
Podium
- First: No 250cc race was held
- Second: No 250cc race was held
- Third: No 250cc race was held

125cc
Pole position
- Rider: (Italy) Pier Paolo Bianchi
- Time: 1:32.330
Fastest lap
- Rider: Unknown
Podium
- First: (Spain) Ángel Nieto
- Second: (Italy) Loris Reggiani
- Third: (Italy) Pier Paolo Bianchi

50cc
Pole position
- Rider: No 50cc was held
Fastest lap
- Rider: No 50cc was held
Podium
- First: No 50cc was held
- Second: No 50cc was held
- Third: No 50cc was held

The 1981 Austrian motorcycle Grand Prix was the second round of the 1981 Grand Prix motorcycle racing season. It took place on the weekend of 24–26 April 1981 at the Salzburgring.

== Classification ==
=== 500 cc ===
Pos.	Rider	Team	Manufacturer	Time/Retired	Points
1	(United States) Randy Mamola	Ingersoll Heron Team Suzuki	Suzuki	48'06.660	15
2	(New Zealand) Graeme Crosby	Ingersoll Heron Team Suzuki	Suzuki	+9.890	12
3	(Japan) Hiroyuki Kawasaki	Ingersoll Heron Team Suzuki	Suzuki	+18.480	10
4	(United Kingdom) Barry Sheene		Yamaha	+20.870	8
5	(Netherlands) Boet van Dulmen		Yamaha	+21.810	6
6	(South Africa) Kork Ballington	Team Kawasaki	Kawasaki	+38.100	5
7	(Italy) Franco Uncini		Suzuki	+48.560	4
8	(Netherlands) Jack Middelburg	Racing Westland	Suzuki	+50.410	3
9	(Netherlands) Wil Hartog	Riemersma Racing	Suzuki	+1'17.310	2
10	(Italy) Gianni Pelletier		Morbidelli	+1 lap	1
11	(Switzerland) Philippe Coulon		Suzuki	+1 lap	
12	(France) Marc Fontan	Team Sonauto Gauloises	Yamaha	+1 lap	
13	(Japan) Takazumi Katayama	Honda International Racing	Honda	+1 lap	
14	(Italy) Walter Migliorati		Suzuki	+1 lap	
15	(Finland) Seppo Rossi		Suzuki	+1 lap	
16	(France) Christian Estrosi		Suzuki	+1 lap	
17	(Switzerland) Sergio Pellandini		Suzuki	+1 lap	
18	(Netherlands) Henk de Vries	Henk de Vries Motoren	Suzuki	+1 lap	
19	(West Germany) Josef Hage	Dieter Braun Team	Yamaha	+1 lap	
20	(Austria) Michael Schmid		Suzuki	+1 lap	
21	(Switzerland) Alain Rothlisberger		Suzuki	+1 lap	
22	(Sweden) Lennart Bäckström		Suzuki	+1 lap	
Ret	(France) Christian Sarron	Team Sonauto Gauloises	Yamaha	Retired	
Ret	(Japan) Sadao Asami		Yamaha	Retired	
Ret	(Italy) Graziano Rossi	Morbidelli	Morbidelli	Retired	
Ret	(New Zealand) Stuart Avant	Ellis Racing	Suzuki	Retired	
Ret	(West Germany) Gustav Reiner	Team Solitude Deutschland	Solo	Retired	
Ret	(Italy) Raffaele Pasqual		Yamaha	Retired	
Ret	(Switzerland) Michel Frutschi	Elf Motor Racing Team	Yamaha	Retired	
Ret	(Australia) Graeme Geddes		Yamaha	Retired	
Ret	(United States) Kenny Roberts	Yamaha Motor Company	Yamaha	Retired	
Ret	(Italy) Marco Lucchinelli	Team Nava Suzuki	Suzuki	Retired	
Ret	(France) Bernard Fau		Yamaha	Retired	
Ret	(France) Patrick Fernandez		Bimota-Yamaha	Retired	
Ret	(South Africa) Jon Ekerold	Team Solitude Deutschland	Solo	Retired	
DNS	(France) Raymond Roche		Suzuki	Did not start	
DNS	(Austria) Stefan Klabacher	Saga Racing	Yamaha	Did not start	
DNQ	(Austria) Fritz Kerschbaumer	Triumph Club Wien	Yamaha	Did not qualify	

Previous race: 1981 Argentine Grand Prix	FIM Grand Prix World Championship; 1981 season	Next race: 1981 German Grand Prix
Previous race: 1979 Austrian Grand Prix	Austrian Grand Prix	Next race: 1982 Austrian Grand Prix
