= 1980 Finnish motorcycle Grand Prix =

(Finland) 1980 Finnish Grand Prix
Race details
- Race 7 of 10 races in the 1980 Grand Prix motorcycle racing season
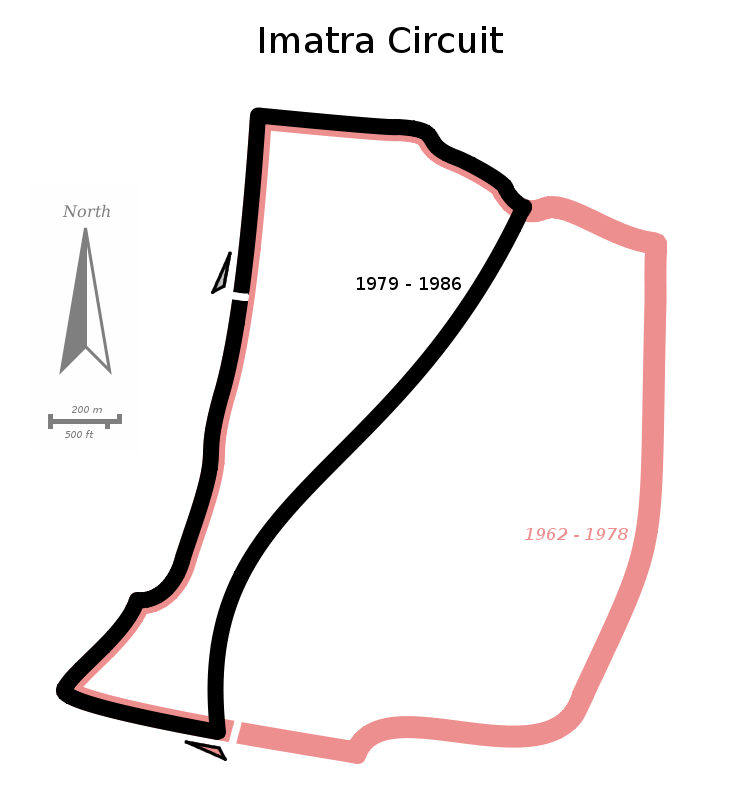
- Date: 27 July 1980
- Official name: Finnish GP
- Location: Imatra Circuit
- Course: Permanent racing facility; 4.950 km (3.076 mi)

500cc
Pole position
- Rider: (Italy) Graziano Rossi
- Time: 1:53.800
Fastest lap
- Rider: (Italy) Marco Lucchinelli
- Time: 1:55.900
Podium
- First: (Netherlands) Wil Hartog
- Second: (United States) Kenny Roberts
- Third: (Italy) Franco Uncini

350cc
Pole position
- Rider: No 350cc race was held
Fastest lap
- Rider: No 350cc race was held
Podium
- First: No 350cc race was held
- Second: No 350cc race was held
- Third: No 350cc race was held

250cc
Pole position
- Rider: Unknown
Fastest lap
- Rider: Unknown
Podium
- First: (South Africa) Kork Ballington
- Second: (West Germany) Anton Mang
- Third: (Switzerland) Roland Freymond

125cc
Pole position
- Rider: Unknown
Fastest lap
- Rider: Unknown
Podium
- First: (Spain) Ángel Nieto
- Second: (Italy) Pier Paolo Bianchi
- Third: (Switzerland) Hans Müller

50cc
Pole position
- Rider: No 50cc race was held
Fastest lap
- Rider: No 50cc race was held
Podium
- First: No 50cc race was held
- Second: No 50cc race was held
- Third: No 50cc race was held

The 1980 Finnish motorcycle Grand Prix was the seventh round of the 1980 Grand Prix motorcycle racing season. It took place on the weekend of 25-27 July 1980 at the Imatra Circuit.

== Classification ==
=== 500 cc ===
Pos	Rider	Manufacturer	Time/Retired	Points
1	(Netherlands) Wil Hartog	Riemersma Racing	50'51.800	15
2	(United States) Kenny Roberts	Yamaha Motor Company	+9.500	12
3	(Italy) Franco Uncini	Suzuki	+22.800	10
4	(United States) Randy Mamola	Suzuki	+33.300	8
5	(South Africa) Kork Ballington	Team Kawasaki	+40.300	6
6	(France) Patrick Pons	Team Sonauto Gauloises	+43.400	5
7	(Italy) Carlo Perugini	Suzuki	+46.700	4
8	(Switzerland) Philippe Coulon	Marlboro Nava Frankonia	+1'05.600	3
9	(Japan) Sadao Asami	Yamaha Motor Company	+1'16.700	2
10	(France) Raymond Roche	Team Sonauto Gauloises	+1'21.400	1
11	(France) Franck Gross	Elf Motor Racing Team	+1'24.900	
12	(Sweden) Lennart Bäckström	Suzuki	+1'38.900	
13	(Finland) Seppo Rossi	Suzuki	+1'39.600	
14	(France) Patrick Fernandez	Ecurie Ste Pernod	+1'59.000	
15	(France) Michel Rougerie	Ecurie Ste Pernod	+2'09.200	
16	(Austria) Werner Nenning	Mobel Nenning Racing Team	+1 lap	
17	(France) Hubert Rigal	Moto Club de Monaco	+1 lap	
18	(Switzerland) Michel Frutschi	Elf Motor Racing Team	+1 lap	
19	(Austria) Max Wiener	Suzuki	+1 lap	
Ret	(Finland) Kimmo Kopra	Yamaha	Retired	
Ret	(Netherlands) Jack Middelburg	Yamaha IMN	Retired	
Ret	(Italy) Marco Lucchinelli	Team Nava Olio Fiat	Retired	
Ret	(Italy) Adelio Faccioli	Suzuki	Retired	
Ret	(Sweden) Peter Sköld	Suzuki	Retired	
Ret	(South Africa) Eddie Grant	Suzuki	Retired	
Ret	(Netherlands) Willem Zoet	Stimorol Racing	Retired	
Ret	(Italy) Graziano Rossi	Team Nava Olio Fiat	Retired	
Ret	(France) Bernard Fau	GME Motul GPA	Retired	
Ret	(Netherlands) Boet van Dulmen	Yamaha Motor Company	Retired	
Ret	(Finland) Peter Sjöström	Suzuki	Retired	
DNS	(Japan) Takazumi Katayama	Suzuki	Did not start	
DNS	(West Germany) Anton Mang	Kawasaki	Did not start	
DNS	(France) Christian Estrosi	Team Furygan Suzuki	Did not start	
DNQ	(Netherlands) Henk de Vries	Suzuki	Did not qualify	
DNQ	(Finland) Timo Pohjola	Suzuki	Did not qualify	
DNQ	(Finland) Markku Matikainen	Suzuki	Did not qualify	

Previous race: 1980 Belgian Grand Prix	FIM Grand Prix World Championship; 1980 season	Next race: 1980 British Grand Prix
Previous race: 1979 Finnish Grand Prix	Finnish Grand Prix	Next race: 1981 Finnish Grand Prix
