= Jeff Sayle (motorcyclist) =

Australian motorcycle racer

Jeffrey Sayle
- Nationality: (Australia) Australian
- Born: 1 October 1954 (age 72); Ryde, New South Wales, Australia
Motorcycle racing career statistics
Grand Prix motorcycle racing
| Active years | 1979 - 1982, 1989 |
| First race | 1979 350cc Nations Grand Prix |
| Last race | 1989 250cc Australian Grand Prix |
Starts / Wins / Podiums / Poles / F. laps / Points; 21 / 0 / 6 / 0 / 1 / 108

Jeffrey Sayle (born 1 October 1954) is a former Grand Prix motorcycle road racer from Australia. His best year was in 1980 when he finished in fifth place in the 350cc world championship. Sayle also competed at the Isle of Man TT races. In 1982, Sayle competed on an innovative 250cc Armstrong motorcycle made with the world's first carbon fiber frame.

== Career statistics ==
=== By season ===
| Season | Class | Motorcycle | Race | Win | Podium | Pole | FLap | Pts | Plcd |
|---|---|---|---|---|---|---|---|---|---|
| 1979 | 250cc | Yamaha | 1 | 0 | 1 | 0 | 0 | 4 | 26th |
| 1979 | 350cc | Yamaha | 5 | 0 | 1 | 0 | 0 | 24 | 10th |
| 1980 | 350cc | Yamaha | 4 | 0 | 1 | 0 | 0 | 25 | 5th |
| 1980 | 500cc | Yamaha | 1 | 0 | 0 | 0 | 0 | 0 | NC |
| 1981 | 250cc | Yamaha | 1 | 0 | 0 | 0 | 0 | 6 | 24th |
| 1981 | 350cc | Yamaha | 2 | 0 | 0 | 0 | 0 | 10 | 15th |
| 1982 | 250cc | Armstrong | 4 | 0 | 2 | 0 | 1 | 27 | 9th |
| 1982 | 350cc | Yamaha | 2 | 0 | 1 | 0 | 0 | 12 | 15th |
| 1989 | 250cc | Yamaha | 1 | 0 | 0 | 0 | 0 | 0 | NC |
| Total | | | 21 | 0 | 6 | 0 | 1 | 108 | |
