= Dale Singleton =

American motorcycle racer

Dale Singleton (August 27, 1955 in Dalton, Georgia – September 1, 1985 in South Carolina) was an American professional motorcycle racer.

Singleton competed at the 1979 Suzuka 8 Hours. Singleton won the Daytona 200 in 1979 and 1981 – both for privateer teams. Also in 1981, he won the AMA Road Racing Championship.

Singleton was killed in a plane crash in 1985.

Singleton was inducted into the AMA Motorcycle Hall of Fame in 2002.
