= Guy Bertin =

French motorcycle racer (born 1954)

- Nationality: French
Motorcycle racing career statistics
Grand Prix motorcycle racing
Active years	1977 - 1988
First race	1977 250cc French Grand Prix
Last race	1988 250cc Brazilian Grand Prix
First win	1979 125cc Czechoslovak Grand Prix
Last win	1981 125cc Nations Grand Prix
Team	Motobécane
Starts / Wins / Podiums / Poles / F. laps / Points; 62 / 6 / 12 / 8 / 8 / 220

Guy Bertin (born 25 November 1954) is a French former Grand Prix motorcycle road racer. His best year was in 1980 when he raced for the Motobécane factory racing team, winning three Grand Prix races and finishing in second place in the 125cc world championship behind Pier Paolo Bianchi. Bertin won six Grand Prix races during his career. Bertin contested the 2013 International Classic Grand Prix series on a Kawasaki KR350.

== Career statistics ==
=== FIM Endurance World Championship ===
Year	Bike	Rider	TC
1984	Honda RC45	(France) Guy Bertin (France) Dominique Sarron	2nd
