= Otello Buscherini =

Italian motorcycle racer (1949–1976)

- Nationality: Italian
- Born: 19 January 1949; Forlì, Italy
- Died: 16 May 1976 (aged 27); Mugello, Italy
Motorcycle racing career statistics
Grand Prix motorcycle racing
| Active years | 1970 - 1976 |
| First race | 1970 50cc West German Grand Prix |
| Last race | 1976 125cc Austrian Grand Prix |
| First win | 1973 125cc Czechoslovak Grand Prix |
| Last win | 1975 350cc Czechoslovak Grand Prix |
| Team | Malanca |
Starts / Wins / Podiums / Poles / F. laps / Points; 29 / 3 / 17 / 4 / 6 / 267

Otello Buscherini (19 January 1949 in Forlì - 16 May 1976 in Mugello) was an Italian professional motorcycle road racer. He competed in Grand Prix motorcycle racing between 1970 and 1976, most prominently as a member of the Malanca factory racing team. Buscherini appeared to be poised for a successful racing career when he was killed in an accident at the 1976 Nations Grand Prix.

== Motorcycle racing career ==
Buscherini was born in Forlì, Italy, on 19 January 1949 and began racing motorcycles in 1966 with a Minarelli. He earned the nickname, the Lion of Romagna for his spirited and sometimes reckless riding style. At the age of 21, Buscherini scored his first World Championship points with a sixth-place finish at the 1970 50cc West German Grand Prix.

Buscherini experienced his greatest success when he joined the Malanca factory racing team in 1972. He won the 1972 50cc Italian National Championship and scored two third-place results in the 1972 50cc World Championship. Buscherini rode a Malanca to win the first World Championship race of his career with a victory over Chas Mortimer (Yamaha) at the 1973 125cc Czechoslovak Grand Prix. Two weeks later at the 125cc Finnish Grand Prix, he defeated the eventual World Champion Kent Andersson (Yamaha) to claim the second victory of his career and finished the season ranked fifth in the season final points standings.

Buscherini scored five podium results in the 1974 125cc World Championship and improved to fourth place in the season final standings. At the 1975 Czechoslovak Grand Prix, he rode a Bimota-Yamaha to win the 350cc class and finished second to Michel Rougerie (Harley Davidson) in the 250cc class.

Buscherini died at the age of 27 on 16 May 1976 from injuries sustained while competing in the 1976 250cc Nations Grand Prix at Mugello.

Buscherini won three Grand Prix races and scored 17 podium results in 29 races during his World Championship career.

In 2003, the municipality of Forlì named the Otello Buscherini Municipal Sports Club in his honor.

== Grand Prix motorcycle racing results ==
Points system from 1969 onwards:

| **Position** | 1 | 2 | 3 | 4 | 5 | 6 | 7 | 8 | 9 | 10 |
| **Points** | 15 | 12 | 10 | 8 | 6 | 5 | 4 | 3 | 2 | 1 |

(key) (Races in bold indicate pole position; races in italics indicate fastest lap)

| Year | Class | Machine | 1 | 2 | 3 | 4 | 5 | 6 | 7 | 8 | 9 | 10 | 11 | 12 | Points | Rank | Wins |
|---|---|---|---|---|---|---|---|---|---|---|---|---|---|---|---|---|---|
| 1970 | 50cc | Honda | GER; 6 | FRA - | YUG - | | NED - | BEL - | DDR - | CZE - | FIN - | ULS - | NAT - | ESP - | 5 | 18th | 0 |
| 1970 | 125cc | Villa | GER; 5 | FRA - | YUG - | IOM - | NED - | BEL - | DDR - | CZE - | FIN - | | NAT - | ESP - | 6 | 25th | 0 |
| 1971 | 125cc | Derbi | AUT - | GER - | IOM - | NED - | BEL - | DDR - | CZE - | SWE - | FIN - | NAT - | ESP; 6 | | 5 | 20th | 0 |
| 1972 | 50cc | Malanca | GER - | NAT; 4 | YUG; 3 | NED - | BEL - | DDR; 3 | SWE - | ESP; 7 | | | | | 32 | 5th | 0 |
| 1973 | 125cc | Malanca | FRA; 6 | AUT; 4 | GER - | NAT - | IOM - | YUG - | NED - | BEL - | CZE; 1 | SWE; 4 | FIN; 1 | ESP - | 51 | 5th | 2 |
| 1974 | 50cc | Malanca | FRA; 3 | GER - | | NAT; 3 | NED - | BEL - | SWE; 5 | FIN - | CZE - | YUG - | ESP - | | 26 | 8th | 0 |
| 1974 | 125cc | Malanca | FRA; 3 | GER - | AUT; 3 | NAT - | NED; 2 | BEL; 5 | SWE - | | CZE; 3 | YUG - | ESP; 2 | | 60 | 4th | 0 |
| 1975 | 125cc | Malanca | FRA - | ESP - | AUT - | GER - | NAT - | | NED; 6 | BEL - | SWE - | | CZE - | YUG - | 5 | 17th | 0 |
| 1975 | 250cc | Yamaha | FRA - | ESP - | | GER - | NAT - | IOM - | NED - | BEL - | SWE; 2 | FIN; 3 | CZE; 2 | YUG; 5 | 40 | 7th | 0 |
| 1975 | 350cc | Yamaha | FRA - | ESP - | AUT - | GER - | NAT - | IOM - | NED - | | | FIN - | CZE; 1 | YUG; 2 | 27 | 8th | 1 |
| 1976 | 125cc | Malanca | AUT; 3 | NAT - | YUG - | NED - | BEL - | SWE - | FIN - | GER - | ESP - | | | | 10 | 14th | 0 |
