= Hideo Kanaya =

Japanese motorcycle racer (1945–2013)

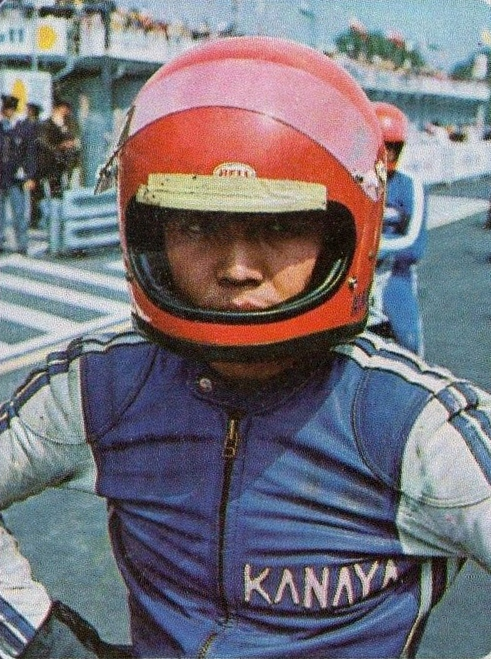
- Hideo Kanaya c. 1973
- Nationality: Japanese
Motorcycle racing career statistics
Grand Prix motorcycle racing
Active years	1967, 1972 - 1973, 1975
First race	1967 125cc Japanese Grand Prix
Last race	1975 500cc Italian Grand Prix
First win	1972 250cc German Grand Prix
Last win	1975 500cc Austrian Grand Prix
Team(s)	Kawasaki, Yamaha
Starts / Wins / Podiums / Poles / F. laps / Points; 21 / 3 / 15 / 2 / 1 / 207

Hideo Kanaya (Shinjitai: 金谷 秀夫, Hideo Kanaya; February 3, 1945 – December 19, 2013) was a Japanese professional motorcycle racer and motorcycle racing team manager. He competed in the Grand Prix motorcycle road racing world championships from 1967 to 1975. He dominated Japanese road racing in the early 1970s and was the first Japanese rider to win a world championship 500cc Grand Prix race. Although Kanaya was a competitive racer, he was never allowed to compete in a full season in the world championships as, his main responsibility was as a test rider in Japan.

== Motorcycle racing career ==
Born in Kobe, Japan, Kanaya first rose to prominence as a Kawasaki rider when, he finished in third place behind Bill Ivy and Stuart Graham at the 1967 125cc Japanese Grand Prix. In 1969 he won the 250cc class of the All Japan Road Race Championship riding a Kawasaki. Kanaya became a member of the Yamaha factory racing team in 1970, and in 1971, he won the 90cc class as well as the open class of the All Japan Road Race Championship.

In 1972, Yamaha sent Kanaya to Europe to compete in the 250cc and 350cc classes of the Grand Prix road racing world championships. At the season-opening 250cc German Grand Prix, held at the challenging, 14.2 miles (22.9 km) long Nürburgring race track, Kanaya surprised his opposition by winning his first 250cc Grand Prix race on a standard Yamaha 250 TD3. He scored three more podium results in 1972 to finish the season ranked 11th in the 250cc class and eighth in the 350cc class. In his sole 500cc class appearance of 1972, he scored a fourth place result at the Belgian Grand Prix.

For the 1973 season, Yamaha promoted Kanaya alongside 1972 250cc world champion Jarno Saarinen to compete on the newly developed four-cylinder, two-stroke YZR500 0W20 in the premier 500cc class. They would also compete in the 250cc class on a water cooled YZR250 0W17. Kanaya began the season with three consecutive second place results behind his teammate Saarinen in the 250cc class and, second and third place finishes in the 500cc class however, after Saarinen was tragically killed while competing in the fourth round of the championship at the Monza Circuit, Yamaha made the decision to withdraw its team for the remainder of the 1973 season and, Kanaya was sent back to Japan to resume his duties as a test rider.

Kanaya was due to return to the world championships for the 1974 season as a teammate for multi-time world champion Giacomo Agostini however, Kanaya suffered serious injuries while competing in the pre-season Daytona 200 motorcycle race and, he was forced to miss the 1974 world championships as he recovered from his injuries.

In his first race back after recovering from his injuries at the season opening 1975 500cc French Grand Prix, Kanaya finished in an impressive second place, just 0.5 seconds behind his teammate Agostini. At the third round of the world championship held at the fast Salzburgring circuit, he scored an impressive double victory by winning the 350cc and 500cc classes of the Austrian Grand Prix, becoming the first Japanese rider to win either class. After a third place finish at the fifth race of the season in Italy, Yamaha ordered Kanaya to return to Japan to continue his test riding duties. Despite only scoring points in four races, he still finished the 1975 season ranked third in the 500cc world championship final standings behind Giacomo Agostini and MV Agusta's Phil Read He also won the Macau Grand Prix in 1975. At the Suzuka round of the 1975 All Japan Championship, Kanaya shattered the existing lap record of 2 minutes, 20 seconds when he accomplished a lap time of 2:16.2.

In 1976, Kanaya returned to compete in the Daytona 200 where, he qualified on the front row as the third fastest rider behind Kenny Roberts and Steve Baker. He finished the race in seventh place after his motorcycle developed tire wear problems which, forced him to make a pit stop for a tire change. Kanaya retired from racing in 1982 after competing in the TBC Big Road Race.

In Japan, Kanaya continued to perform development work on Yamaha Grand Prix and production class race bikes. He died on December 19, 2013, at the age of 68.

== Grand Prix motorcycle racing results ==
Points system from 1950 to 1968:

**Position**	1	2	3	4	5	6
**Points**	8	6	4	3	2	1

Points system from 1969 onwards:

**Position**	1	2	3	4	5	6	7	8	9	10
**Points**	15	12	10	8	6	5	4	3	2	1

(key) (Races in bold indicate pole position; races in italics indicate fastest lap)

Year	Class	Team	1	2	3	4	5	6	7	8	9	10	11	12	13	Points	Rank	Wins
1967	125cc	Kawasaki	ESP -	GER -	FRA -	IOM -	NED -	BEL -	DDR -	CZE -	FIN -	ULS -	NAT -	CAN -	JPN; 3	4	12th	0
1972	250cc	Yamaha	GER; 1	FRA; 3	AUT -	NAT -	IOM -	YUG -	NED; 10	BEL -	DDR -	CZE -	SWE -	FIN -	ESP -	26	11th	1
1972	350cc	Yamaha	GER; 3	FRA -	AUT; 2	NAT; 5	IOM -	YUG; 4	NED; 6		DDR -	CZE -	SWE -	FIN -	ESP -	41	8th	0
1972	500cc	Yamaha	GER -	FRA -	AUT -	NAT -	IOM -	YUG -	NED -	BEL; 4	DDR -	CZE -	SWE -	FIN -	ESP -	8	22nd	0
1973	250cc	Yamaha	FRA; 2	AUT; 2	GER; 2	IOM -	YUG -	NED -	BEL -	CZE -	SWE -	FIN -	ESP -			36	7th	0
1973	500cc	Yamaha	FRA; 3	AUT; 2	GER -	IOM -	YUG -	NED -	BEL -	CZE -	SWE -	FIN -	ESP -			22	8th	0
1975	350cc	Yamaha	FRA -	ESP; 3	AUT; 1	GER -	NAT -	IOM -	NED -			FIN -	CZE -	YUG -		25	10th	1
1975	500cc	Yamaha	FRA; 2		AUT; 1	GER; 4	NAT; 3	IOM -	NED -	BEL -	SWE -	FIN -	CZE -			45	3rd	1

Sporting positions
Preceded by Hiroyuki Kawasaki	Macau Motorcycle Grand Prix Winner; 1975	Succeeded by Chas Mortimer
