= 1975 French motorcycle Grand Prix =

(France) 1975 French Grand Prix
Race details
- Race 1 of 12 races in the 1975 Grand Prix motorcycle racing season
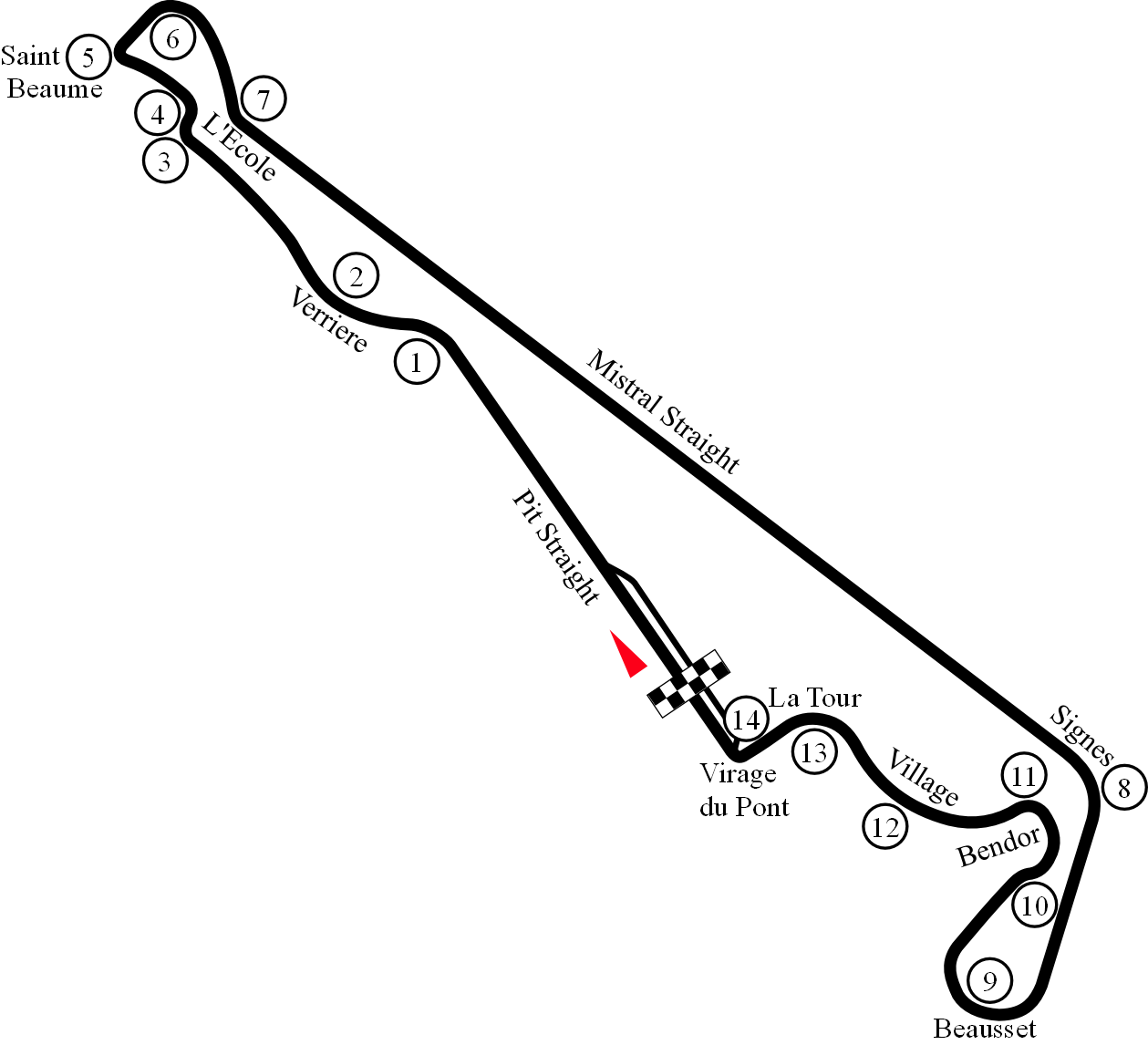
- Date: 30 March 1975
- Official name: Grand Prix de France Moto
- Location: Circuit Paul Ricard
- Course: Permanent racing facility; 5.810 km (3.610 mi)

500cc
Pole position
- Rider: (Finland) Teuvo Länsivuori
- Time: 2:12.300
Fastest lap
- Rider: (Japan) Hideo Kanaya
- Time: 2:13.800
Podium
- First: (Italy) Giacomo Agostini
- Second: (Japan) Hideo Kanaya
- Third: (United Kingdom) Phil Read

350cc
Pole position
- Rider: (Venezuela) Johnny Cecotto
Fastest lap
- Rider: (Venezuela) Johnny Cecotto
Podium
- First: (Venezuela) Johnny Cecotto
- Second: (Italy) Giacomo Agostini
- Third: (France) Gerard Choukroun

250cc
Pole position
- Rider: (Japan) Ikujiro Takai
- Time: 2:19.600
Fastest lap
- Rider: (Venezuela) Johnny Cecotto
- Time: 2:18.000
Podium
- First: (Venezuela) Johnny Cecotto
- Second: (Japan) Ikujiro Takai
- Third: (France) Michel Rougerie

125cc
Pole position
- Rider: (Italy) Pier Paolo Bianchi
Fastest lap
- Rider: (Italy) Paolo Pileri
- Time: 2:29.000
Podium
- First: (Sweden) Kent Andersson
- Second: (Sweden) Leif Gustafsson
- Third: (Italy) Paolo Pileri

50cc
Pole position
- Rider: None
- Time: None
Fastest lap
- Rider: None
- Time: None
Podium
- First: None
- Second: None
- Third: None

The 1975 French motorcycle Grand Prix was the first round of the 1975 Grand Prix motorcycle racing season. It took place on the weekend of 28–30 March 1975 at the Paul Ricard Circuit.

== 500cc classification ==
Pos.	Rider	Team	Manufacturer	Time/Retired	Points
1	(Italy) Giacomo Agostini	Yamaha Motor NV	Yamaha	50'09.800	15
2	(Japan) Hideo Kanaya	Yamaha Motor NV	Yamaha	+0.500	12
3	(United Kingdom) Phil Read	MV Agusta	MV Agusta	+29.200	10
4	(Italy) Armando Toracca		MV Agusta	+30.600	8
5	(France) Patrick Pons	Equipe Sonauto BP Gauloises	Yamaha	+1'36.300	6
6	(United Kingdom) Peter McKinley		Yamaha	+1'49.800	5
7	(France) Michel Rougerie	AMF Harley-Davidson	Harley-Davidson	+1'54.100	4
8	(Austria) Karl Auer	Racing Team NO	Yamaha	+1'55.200	3
9	(United Kingdom) Alex George		Yamaha	+1'55.400	2
10	(Norway) Kjell Solberg		Yamaha	+2'02.800	1
11	(Netherlands) Marcel Ankoné	Marcel Ankoné	Suzuki	+1 lap	
12	(Brazil) Adu Celso-Santos	Carvalho Racing	Yamaha	+1 lap	
13	(West Germany) Helmut Kassner		Yamaha	+1 lap	
14	(United Kingdom) Steve Ellis		Yamaha	+1 lap	
15	(France) Christian Bourgeois		Yamaha	+1 lap	
16	(France) Florian Burki	Jacques Berlioz	Yamaha	+1 lap	
17	(Australia) Les Kenny		Yamaha	+1 lap	
18	(Switzerland) Felix Harzenmoser	Munot Racing Team	Yamaha	+1 lap	
19	(Italy) Nico Cereghini		Suzuki	+1 lap	
20	(West Germany) Walter Kaletsch		Yamaha	+1 lap	
Ret	(Finland) Teuvo Länsivuori	Suzuki Motor Company	Suzuki	Retired	
Ret	(West Germany) Horst Lahfeld		König	Retired	
Ret	(Switzerland) Pierre Longet		Yamaha	Retired	
Ret	(Austria) Gernot Maas		Rotax	Retired	
Ret	(United Kingdom) Paul Cott		Yamaha	Retired	
Ret	(West Germany) Bernd Tungethal		Yamaha	Retired	
Ret	(France) Roger Ruiz		Yamaha	Retired	
Ret	(Australia) Jack Findlay		Yamaha	Retired	
Ret	(France) Didier Ravel		Yamaha	Retired	
Ret	(West Germany) Reinhard Hiller		König	Retired	
Ret	(Finland) Pentti Korhonen		Yamaha	Retired	
Ret	(Italy) Guido Mandracci		Yamaha	Retired	
Ret	(Spain) Jaime Samaranch		Harley-Davidson	Retired	
Ret	(United Kingdom) John Williams		Yamaha	Retired	
Ret	(France) Jean-Paul Boinet		Yamaha	Retired	
Ret	(West Germany) Dieter Braun	Mitsui Maschinen	Yamaha	Retired	
DNS	(France) Gerard Debrock		Yamaha	Did not start	
DNS	(West Germany) Ernst Hiller		König	Did not start	
DNS	(United Kingdom) Robert Keller		Yamaha	Did not start	

Previous race: 1974 Spanish Grand Prix	FIM Grand Prix World Championship; 1975 season	Next race: 1975 Spanish Grand Prix
Previous race: 1974 French Grand Prix	French Grand Prix	Next race: 1976 French Grand Prix
