= 1976 Austrian motorcycle Grand Prix =

Motorcycle Grand Prix

(Austria) 1976 Austrian Grand Prix
Race details
- Race 2 of 12 races in the 1976 Grand Prix motorcycle racing season
- Date: 2 May 1976
- Official name: Austrian Grand Prix/Grosser Preis von Österreich
- Location: Salzburgring
- Course: Permanent racing facility; 4.241 km (2.635 mi)

500cc
Pole position
Rider	(United Kingdom) Barry Sheene	Suzuki
Time	1:23.380	
Fastest lap
Rider	(United Kingdom) Barry Sheene	Suzuki
Time	1:23.930	
Podium
First	(United Kingdom) Barry Sheene	Suzuki
Second	(Italy) Marco Lucchinelli	Suzuki
Third	(United Kingdom) Phil Read	Suzuki

350cc
Pole position
Rider	(Venezuela) Johnny Cecotto	Yamaha
Time	1:26.310	
Fastest lap
Rider	(Italy) Walter Villa	Harley-Davidson
Time	1:26.660	
Podium
First	(Venezuela) Johnny Cecotto	Yamaha
Second	(Italy) Walter Villa	Harley-Davidson
Third	(Australia) John Dodds	Yamaha

125cc
Pole position
Rider	(Italy) Pierpaolo Bianchi	Morbidelli
Time	1:35.570	
Fastest lap
Rider	(Italy) Pierpaolo Bianchi	Morbidelli
Time	1:35.010	
Podium
First	(Italy) Pierpaolo Bianchi	Morbidelli
Second	(Italy) Paolo Pileri	Morbidelli
Third	(Italy) Otello Buscherini	Malanca

Sidecar (B2A)
Pole position
Rider	(Switzerland) Rolf Biland	Seymaz-Yamaha
Passenger	(United Kingdom) Ken Williams	
Time	1:34.240	
Fastest lap
Rider	(West Germany) Rolf Steinhausen	Busch-König
Passenger	(West Germany) Sepp Huber	
Time	1:35.120	
Podium
First rider	(West Germany) Rolf Steinhausen	Busch-König
First passenger	(West Germany) Sepp Huber	
Second rider	(West Germany) Werner Schwärzel	König
Second passenger	(West Germany) Andreas Huber	
Third rider	(West Germany) Siegfried Schauzu	Aro
Third passenger	(West Germany) A. Lorentz	

The 1976 Austrian motorcycle Grand Prix was the second round of the 1976 Grand Prix motorcycle racing season. It took place on 2 May 1976 at the Salzburgring circuit.

== 500cc classification ==
Pos.	No.	Rider	Team	Manufacturer	Time/Retired	Points
1	7	(United Kingdom) Barry Sheene	Texaco Heron Team Suzuki	Suzuki	1:01'21.760	15
2	40	(Italy) Marco Lucchinelli	Gallina Corse	Suzuki	+13.400	12
3	2	(United Kingdom) Phil Read	Team Life International	Suzuki	+19.310	10
4	20	(France) Michel Rougerie		Suzuki	+1'05.060	8
5	47	(New Zealand) Stuart Avant	Colemans	Suzuki	+1'13.880	6
6	11	(Italy) Giacomo Agostini	Team API Marlboro	MV Agusta	+1'15.190	5
7	33	(Spain) Víctor Palomo	Swaep Motor Racing	Yamaha	+1 lap	4
8	10	(Australia) Jack Findlay	Jack Findlay Racing	Suzuki	+1 lap	3
9	12	(Austria) Karl Auer	Racing Team NO	Yamaha	+1 lap	2
10	8	(United Kingdom) Alex George	Hermetite Racing International	Yamaha	+2 laps	1
11	39	(West Germany) Helmut Kassner		Suzuki	+2 laps	
12	23	(United Kingdom) Tom Herron		Yamaha	+2 laps	
13	43	(Netherlands) Boet van Dulmen	Laponder Racing	Yamaha	+2 laps	
14	24	(Switzerland) Hans Stadelmann		Yamaha	+2 laps	
15	14	(West Germany) Dieter Braun		Suzuki	+2 laps	
16	28	(Austria) Max Wiener	Racing Team NO	Yamaha	+2 laps	
17	26	(Denmark) Børge Nielsen		Yamaha	+3 laps	
18	18	(France) Olivier Chevallier		Yamaha	+3 laps	
19	31	(Austria) Michael Schmid	Racing Team Albatros	Yamaha	+3 laps	
20	36	(Czechoslovakia) Peter Baláž		Yamaha	+4 laps	
21	30	(Austria) Siegfried Mayr		Yamaha	+4 laps	
22	37	(Belgium) Philippe Chaltin		Yamaha	+7 laps	
Ret	11	(United Kingdom) Chas Mortimer	Takazumi Katayama Sarome Team	Yamaha	Retired	
Ret	??	(France) Patrick Pons	Team Sonauto Gauloises	Yamaha	Retired	
Ret	??	(France) Gerard Choukroun	Team Sonauto Gauloises	Yamaha	Retired	
Ret	??	(Finland) Pentti Korhonen		Yamaha	Retired	
Ret	55	(Venezuela) Johnny Cecotto	Team Venemotos	Yamaha	Accident	
Ret	??	(Australia) John Dodds	Mitsui Racing Team	Yamaha	Retired	
Ret	??	(Netherlands) Wil Hartog	Riemersma Racing	Suzuki	Retired	
Ret	??	(Switzerland) Philippe Coulon		Suzuki	Retired	
Ret	??	(United Kingdom) John Williams	Texaco Heron Team Suzuki	Suzuki	Accident	
Ret	??	(Italy) Armando Toracca	Gallina Corse	Suzuki	Retired	
Ret	??	(United States) Pat Hennen	Colemans	Suzuki	Retired	
DSQ (Note: Länsivuori was disqualified for not stopping his engine during a refuelling stop.)	??	(Finland) Teuvo Länsivuori	Life Racing Team	Suzuki	Disqualified	
WD (Note: After the race, it was discovered that Katayama used a 350 cc Yamaha instead of the 370 cc Yamaha he had used in practice. Katayama then withdrew from the official results.)	??	(Japan) Takazumi Katayama	Takazumi Katayama Sarome Team	Yamaha	Withdrew	
DNS	??	(Switzerland) Bruno Kneubühler		Yamaha	Did not start	

Footnotes

== 350 cc classification ==
Pos	No.	Rider	Manufacturer	Laps	Time	Grid	Points
1	1	(Venezuela) Johnny Cecotto	Yamaha	35	51:18.83	1	15
2	24	(Italy) Walter Villa	Harley Davidson	35	+8.15	2	12
3	22	(Australia) John Dodds	Yamaha	35	+37.31	8	10
4	28	(Sweden) Leif Gustafsson	Yamaha	35	+46.61	5	8
5	4	(Germany) Dieter Braun	Morbidelli	35	+51.97	9	6
6	9	(United Kingdom) Tom Herron	Yamaha	35	+56.56	4	5
7	16	(France) Olivier Chevallier	Yamaha	30	+56.80	7	4
8	6	(United Kingdom) Chas Mortimer	Yamaha	35	+1:06.67	16	3
9	5	(France) Patrick Pons	Yamaha	35	+1:06.98	15	2
10	26	(Italy) Gianfranco Bonera	Harley Davidson	35	+1:13.80	17	1
11	18	(Switzerland) Bruno Kneubühler	Yamaha	35	+1:16.91	10	
12	53	(Italy) Paolo Tordi	Yamaha	35	+1:21.87		
13	10	(Spain) Víctor Palomo	Yamaha	35	+1:27.32		
14	51	(Italy) Franco Uncini	Yamaha	35	+1:28.65	19	
15	55	(France) Jean-François Baldé	Yamaha	34	+1 lap	11	
16	12	(Switzerland) Philippe Coulon	Yamaha	34	+1 lap		
17	23	(Australia) Jack Findlay	Yamaha	34	+1 lap		
18	30	(Switzerland) Hans Müller	Tschannen	34	+1 lap		
19	29	(Denmark) Børge Nielsen	Yamaha	34	+1 lap		
20	15	(Switzerland) Hans Stadelmann	Yamaha	34	+1 lap		
21	34	(Belgium) Philippe Chaltin	Yamaha	34	+1 lap		
22	25	(Austria) Max Wiener	Yamaha	33	+2 laps		
Ret		(Japan) Takazumi Katayama	Yamaha			3	
Ret		(Italy) Giacomo Agostini	MV Agusta			6	
Ret		(Finland) Tapio Virtanen	MZ			12	
Ret		(France) Gérard Choukron	Yamaha			13	
Ret		(United Kingdom) Alex George	Yamaha			18	
Ret		(Finland) Pentti Korhonen	Yamaha			20	
36 starters in total

== 125 cc classification ==
Pos	No.	Rider	Manufacturer	Laps	Time	Grid	Points
1	2	(Italy) Pierpaolo Bianchi	Morbidelli	30	48:11.98	1	15
2	1	(Italy) Paolo Pileri	Morbidelli	30	+36.69	2	12
3	5	(Italy) Otello Buscherini	Malanca	30	+1:08.04	3	10
4	18	(Spain) Ángel Nieto	Bultaco	29	+1 lap	4	8
5	41	(Switzerland) Xaver Tschannen	Maico	28	+2 laps	6	6
6	8	(Austria) Hans Zemsauer	Rotax	28	+2 laps	7	5
7	16	(Austria) Hans Hummel	Yamaha	27	+3 laps	11	4
8	10	(Switzerland) Hans Müller	Yamaha	27	+3 laps	15	3
9	12	(Germany) Peter Frohnmeyer	Nava	27	+3 laps	9	2
10	21	(Austria) Werner Schmied	Rotax	27	+3 laps	14	1
11	17	(Switzerland) Ulrich Graf	Yamaha	27	+3 laps	17	
12	46	(Austria) Hans Prähauser	Yamaha	26	+4 laps		
13	32	(Hungary) Peter Szabo	MZ	26	+4 laps		
14	33	(Hungary) János Reisz	Yamaha	25	+5 laps		
Ret		(Italy) Eugenio Lazzarini	Morbidelli			5	
Ret		(Netherlands) Cees van Dongen	Morbidelli			8	
Ret		(Finland) Matti Matikainen	Maico			10	
Ret		(Finland) Auno Hakala	Yamaha			12	
Ret		(Sweden) Hans Hallberg	Yamaha			13	
Ret		(Germany) Anton Mang	Morbidelli			16	
Ret		(Austria) Heinz Pristavnik	Yamaha			18	
Ret		(Germany) Michael Fahrmeier	Yamaha			19	
Ret		(Austria) Franz Leitner	Yamaha			20	
25 starters in total

== Sidecar classification ==
Pos	No.	Rider	Passenger	Manufacturer	Laps	Time	Grid	Points
1	1	(Germany) Rolf Steinhausen	(Germany) Sepp Huber	Busch-König	30	48:26.29	3	15
2	2	(Germany) Werner Schwärzel	(Germany) Andreas Huber	König	30	+9.45	2	12
3	19	(Germany) Siegfried Schauzu	(Germany) A. Lorentz	Aro	30	+1:21.76	5	10
4	7	(Switzerland) Hermann Schmid	(Switzerland) Jean-Pierre Martial	Yamaha	29	+1 lap	6	8
5	32	(United Kingdom) Gerry Boret	(United Kingdom) Nick Boret	Yamaha	29	+1 lap		6
6	31	(France) Alain Michel	(France) Bernard Garcia	Yamaha	29	+1 lap	10	5
7	29	(Germany) Ted Janssen	(Germany) Eric Schmitz	Heukerott	29	+1 lap		4
8	21	(Switzerland) Hanspeter Hubacher	(Switzerland) Kurt Huber	Yamaha	29	+1 lap	8	3
9	16	(United Kingdom) Dick Greasley	(United Kingdom) Cliff Holland	Chell Yamaha	29	+1 lap		2
10	9	(Italy) Amedeo Zini	(Italy) Andrea Fornaro	König	28	+2 laps		1
Ret		(Switzerland) Rolf Biland	(United Kingdom) Ken Williams	Seymaz-Yamaha			1	
Ret		(Germany) Helmut Schilling	(Germany) Rainer Gundel	Aro			4	
Ret		(United Kingdom) George O'Dell	(United Kingdom) Alan Gosling	May Yamaha			7	
Ret		(Austria) Hans Prugl	(Austria) Horst Kussberger	König			9	
20 starters in total

Previous race: 1976 French Grand Prix	FIM Grand Prix World Championship; 1976 season	Next race: 1976 Nations Grand Prix
Previous race: 1975 Austrian Grand Prix	Austrian Grand Prix	Next race: 1977 Austrian Grand Prix
