= 1975 Czechoslovak motorcycle Grand Prix =

(Czechoslovakia) 1975 Czechoslovak Grand Prix
Race details
- Race 11 of 12 races in the 1975 Grand Prix motorcycle racing season
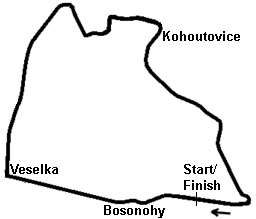
- Date: 4 August 1975
- Official name: Grand Prix ČSSR
- Location: Brno Circuit
- Course: Permanent racing facility; 10.920 km (6.785 mi)

500cc
Pole position
- Rider: (Finland) Teuvo Länsivuori
- Time: 3:37.400
Fastest lap
- Rider: (Finland) Teuvo Länsivuori
- Time: 3:41.500
Podium
- First: (United Kingdom) Phil Read
- Second: (Italy) Giacomo Agostini
- Third: (United Kingdom) Alex George

350cc
Pole position
- Rider: (Venezuela) Johnny Cecotto
- Time: 3:45.400
Fastest lap
- Rider: (Spain) Víctor Palomo
- Time: 3:47.100
Podium
- First: (Italy) Otello Buscherini
- Second: (France) Olivier Chevallier
- Third: (Spain) Víctor Palomo

250cc
Pole position
- Rider: (France) Michel Rougerie
- Time: 3:54.500
Fastest lap
- Rider: (Italy) Otello Buscherini
- Time: 3:49.200
Podium
- First: (France) Michel Rougerie
- Second: (Italy) Otello Buscherini
- Third: (West Germany) Dieter Braun

125cc
Pole position
- Rider: (Italy) Paolo Pileri
- Time: 4:13.500
Fastest lap
- Rider: (Italy) Paolo Pileri
- Time: 4:18.200
Podium
- First: (Sweden) Leif Gustafsson
- Second: (Sweden) Kent Andersson
- Third: (Italy) Eugenio Lazzarini

50cc
Pole position
- Rider: None
Fastest lap
- Rider: None
Podium
- First: None
- Second: None
- Third: None

The 1975 Czechoslovak motorcycle Grand Prix was the eleventh round of the 1975 Grand Prix motorcycle racing season. It took place on the weekend of 22–24 August 1975 at the Brno Circuit.

== 500cc classification ==
Pos.	Rider	Team	Manufacturer	Time/Retired	Points
1	(United Kingdom) Phil Read	MV Agusta	MV Agusta	1:04'23.900	15
2	(Italy) Giacomo Agostini	Yamaha Motor NV	Yamaha	+1'00.400	12
3	(United Kingdom) Alex George		Yamaha	+1'52.100	10
4	(Austria) Karl Auer	Racing Team NO	Yamaha	+2'26.100	8
5	(France) Olivier Chevallier		Yamaha	+2'37.000	6
6	(United Kingdom) Chas Mortimer	Sarome Racing	Yamaha	+3'18.600	5
7	(Netherlands) Marcel Ankoné	Marcel Ankoné	Suzuki	+3'33.700	4
8	(Austria) Hans Braumandl		Yamaha	+1 lap	3
9	(Denmark) Børge Nielsen		Yamaha	+1 lap	2
10	(Finland) Anssi Resko		Yamaha	+2 laps	1
11	(United Kingdom) Charlie Dobson		Yamaha	+2 laps	
Ret	(Czechoslovakia) Peter Baláž		Yamaha	Retired	
Ret	(Switzerland) Philippe Coulon	GIR	Yamaha	Retired	
Ret	(France) Jean-Paul Boinet		Yamaha	Retired	
Ret	(Austria) Michael Schmid	Racing Team NO	Rotax	Retired	
Ret	(Italy) Paolo Tordi		Yamaha	Retired	
Ret	(West Germany) Horst Lahfeld		König	Retired	
Ret	(Czechoslovakia) Bohumil Staša		Jawa	Accident	
Ret	(Finland) Teuvo Länsivuori	Suzuki Motor Company	Suzuki	Fuel problems	
Ret	(Netherlands) Dick Alblas		König	Retired	
Ret	(United Kingdom) Piers Forester		Yamaha	Retired	
Ret	(Australia) Jack Findlay		Yamaha	Retired	
Ret	(United Kingdom) Barry Sheene	Suzuki Motor Company	Suzuki	Retired	
Ret	(Finland) Pentti Korhonen		Yamaha	Retired	
Ret	(United Kingdom) John Williams		Yamaha	Retired	
Ret	(West Germany) Helmut Kassner		Yamaha	Retired	
Ret	(West Germany) Hans-Otto Butenuth		Yamaha	Retired	
Ret	(West Germany) Ulrich Eickmeyer		König	Retired	

Previous race: 1975 Finnish Grand Prix	FIM Grand Prix World Championship; 1975 season	Next race: 1975 Yugoslavian Grand Prix
Previous race: 1974 Czechoslovak Grand Prix	Czechoslovak Grand Prix	Next race: 1976 Czechoslovak Grand Prix
