= 1975 German motorcycle Grand Prix =

Motorbike competition

(West Germany) 1975 German Grand Prix
Race details
- Race 4 of 12 races in the 1975 Grand Prix motorcycle racing season
- Date: 11 May 1975
- Official name: Großer Preis von Deutschland
- Location: Hockenheimring
- Course: Permanent racing facility; 6.789 km (4.218 mi)

500cc
Pole position
- Rider: (Finland) Teuvo Länsivuori
- Time: 2:19.200
Fastest lap
- Rider: (Italy) Giacomo Agostini
- Time: 2:16.800
Podium
- First: (Italy) Giacomo Agostini
- Second: (United Kingdom) Phil Read
- Third: (Finland) Teuvo Länsivuori

350cc
Pole position
- Rider: (Italy) Giacomo Agostini
- Time: 2:24.900
Fastest lap
- Rider: (Venezuela) Johnny Cecotto
- Time: 2:22.300
Podium
- First: (Venezuela) Johnny Cecotto
- Second: (West Germany) Dieter Braun
- Third: (Finland) Pentti Korhonen

250cc
Pole position
- Rider: (Italy) Walter Villa
- Time: 2:29.700
Fastest lap
- Rider: (Italy) Walter Villa
- Time: 2.26.500
Podium
- First: (Italy) Walter Villa
- Second: (France) Michel Rougerie
- Third: (Spain) Víctor Palomo

125cc
Pole position
- Rider: (Italy) Pier Paolo Bianchi
- Time: 2:35.000
Fastest lap
- Rider: (Italy) Pier Paolo Bianchi
- Time: 2.32.400
Podium
- First: (Italy) Paolo Pileri
- Second: (Italy) Pier Paolo Bianchi
- Third: (Sweden) Kent Andersson

50cc
Pole position
- Rider: (Italy) Eugenio Lazzarini
- Time: 2:57.300
Fastest lap
- Rider: (Spain) Ángel Nieto
- Time: 2.55.100
Podium
- First: (Spain) Ángel Nieto
- Second: (Italy) Eugenio Lazzarini
- Third: (Belgium) Julien Vanzeebroeck

The 1975 German motorcycle Grand Prix was the fourth round of the 1975 Grand Prix motorcycle racing season. It took place on the weekend of 9–11 May 1975 at the Hockenheimring.

== 500cc classification ==
Pos.	Rider	Team	Manufacturer	Time/Retired	Points
1	(Italy) Giacomo Agostini	Yamaha Motor NV	Yamaha	46'32.100	15
2	(United Kingdom) Phil Read	MV Agusta	MV Agusta	+3.900	12
3	(Finland) Teuvo Länsivuori	Suzuki Motor Company	Suzuki	+28.300	10
4	(Japan) Hideo Kanaya	Yamaha Motor NV	Yamaha	+54.600	8
5	(United Kingdom) Stan Woods		Suzuki	+1'33.200	6
6	(West Germany) Dieter Braun	Mitsui Maschinen	Yamaha	+2'08.200	5
7	(France) Christian Leon	König Motorenbau	König	+1 lap	4
8	(United Kingdom) Alex George		Yamaha	+1 lap	3
9	(Brazil) Adu Celso-Santos	Carvalho Racing	Yamaha	+1 lap	2
10	(Australia) Jack Findlay		Yamaha	+1 lap	1
11	(Netherlands) Marcel Ankoné	Marcel Ankoné	Suzuki	+1 lap	
12	(United Kingdom) John Newbold		Suzuki	+1 lap	
13	(West Germany) Helmut Kassner		Yamaha	+1 lap	
14	(West Germany) Reinhard Hiller		König	+1 lap	
15	(United Kingdom) Cliff Carr	Harris Everton Racing	Yamaha	+1 lap	
16	(France) Patrick Pons	Equipe Sonauto BP Gauloises	Yamaha	+1 lap	
17	(Switzerland) Florian Burki	Jacques Berlioz	Yamaha	+1 lap	
18	(West Germany) Peter Schrotges		Yamaha	+1 lap	
19	(West Germany) Edmund Czihak		König	+1 lap	
20	(Finland) Pekka Nurmi		Yamaha	+1 lap	
21	(West Germany) Hans-Otto Butenuth		Yamaha	+1 lap	
22	(West Germany) Walter Kaletsch		Yamaha	+1 lap	
23	(West Germany) Egid Schwemmer		Suzuki	+1 lap	
Ret	(West Germany) Horst Lahfeld		König	Retired	
Ret	(United Kingdom) Steve Ellis		Yamaha	Retired	
Ret	(West Germany) Ernst Hiller		König	Retired	
Ret	(France) Michel Rougerie	AMF Harley-Davidson	Harley-Davidson	Retired	
Ret	(Italy) Armando Toracca		MV Agusta	Retired	
Ret	(Switzerland) Felix Harzenmoser	Munot Racing Team	Yamaha	Retired	
Ret	(United Kingdom) Peter McKinley		Yamaha	Retired	
Ret	(Italy) Mimmo Cazzaniga		Harley-Davidson	Retired	
Ret	(Austria) Max Wiener		Rotax	Retired	
Ret	(United Kingdom) John Cowie		Yamaha	Retired	
Ret	(West Germany) Ulrich Eickmeyer		König	Retired	
Ret	(United Kingdom) Barry Sheene	Suzuki Motor Company	Suzuki	Retired	
Ret	(Austria) Karl Auer	Racing Team NO	Yamaha	Retired	
Ret	(Australia) Les Kenny		Yamaha	Retired	
Ret	(United Kingdom) Charlie Williams		Yamaha	Retired	
Ret	(Switzerland) Hans Rudi Keller		Yamaha	Retired	
Ret	(France) Bernard Fau		Yamaha	Retired	

Previous race: 1975 Austrian Grand Prix	FIM Grand Prix World Championship; 1975 season	Next race: 1975 Nations Grand Prix
Previous race: 1974 German Grand Prix	German Grand Prix	Next race: 1976 German Grand Prix
