= 1975 Belgian motorcycle Grand Prix =

(Belgium) 1975 Belgian Grand Prix
Race details
- Race 8 of 12 races in the 1975 Grand Prix motorcycle racing season
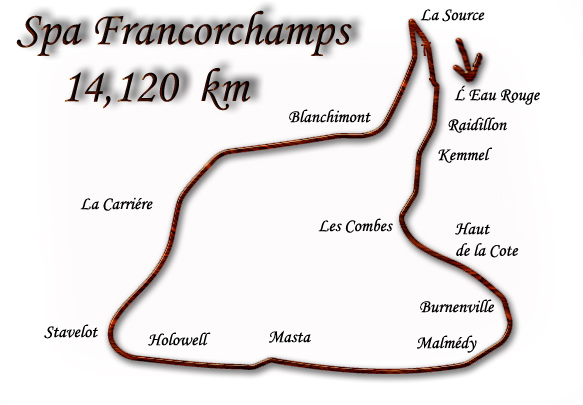
- Date: 6 July 1975
- Official name: Grand Prix de Belgique des Motos/Grote Prijs van Belgie voor Moto's
- Location: Circuit de Spa-Francorchamps
- Course: Permanent racing facility; 14.100 km (8.761 mi)

500cc
Pole position
- Rider: (United Kingdom) Barry Sheene
- Time: 3:52.200
Fastest lap
- Rider: (United Kingdom) Barry Sheene
- Time: 3:52.200
Podium
- First: (United Kingdom) Phil Read
- Second: (United Kingdom) John Newbold
- Third: (Australia) Jack Findlay

350cc
Pole position
- Rider: None
Fastest lap
- Rider: None
Podium
- First: None
- Second: None
- Third: None

250cc
Pole position
- Rider: Unknown
Fastest lap
- Rider: Unknown
Podium
- First: (Venezuela) Johnny Cecotto
- Second: (France) Michel Rougerie
- Third: (Italy) Walter Villa

125cc
Pole position
- Rider: Unknown
Fastest lap
- Rider: Unknown
Podium
- First: (Italy) Paolo Pileri
- Second: (Italy) Pier Paolo Bianchi
- Third: (Sweden) Kent Andersson

50cc
Pole position
- Rider: Unknown
Fastest lap
- Rider: Unknown
Podium
- First: (Belgium) Julien van Zeebroeck
- Second: (Spain) Ángel Nieto
- Third: (Italy) Eugenio Lazzarini

The 1975 Belgian motorcycle Grand Prix was the eighth round of the 1975 Grand Prix motorcycle racing season. It took place on the weekend of 4–6 July 1975 at the Circuit de Spa-Francorchamps.

== 500cc classification ==
Pos.	Rider	Team	Manufacturer	Time/Retired	Points
1	(United Kingdom) Phil Read	MV Agusta	MV Agusta	47'21.100	15
2	(United Kingdom) John Newbold		Suzuki	+1'08.600	12
3	(Australia) Jack Findlay		Yamaha	+1'55.000	10
4	(United Kingdom) Alex George		Yamaha	+2'21.900	8
5	(United Kingdom) John Williams		Yamaha	+2'24.000	6
6	(France) Christian Leon	König Motorenbau	König	+3'12.600	5
7	(South Africa) Alan North		Harley-Davidson	+3'25.200	4
8	(Belgium) Francois Hollebecq		Yamaha	+3'35.800	3
9	(France) Thierry Tchernine		Yamaha	+3'49.400	2
10	(France) Jean-François Baldé		Yamaha	+3'50.500	1
11	(Netherlands) Nico van der Zanden		Yamaha	+1 lap	
Ret	(United Kingdom) Barry Sheene	Suzuki Motor Company	Suzuki	Retired	
Ret	(West Germany) Dieter Braun	Mitsui Maschinen	Yamaha	Retired	
Ret	(West Germany) Helmut Kassner		Yamaha	Retired	
Ret	(Australia) John Dodds		Yamaha	Retired	
Ret	(West Germany) Horst Lahfeld		König	Retired	
Ret	(United Kingdom) Chas Mortimer	Sarome Racing	Yamaha	Retired	
Ret	(Republic of Ireland) Tony Rutter		Yamaha	Retired	
Ret	(United Kingdom) Alex George		Yamaha	Retired	
Ret	(France) Patrick Pons	Equipe Sonauto BP Gauloises	Yamaha	Retired	
Ret	(Spain) Víctor Palomo		Yamaha	Retired	
Ret	(Finland) Pentti Korhonen		Yamaha	Retired	
Ret	(Finland) Teuvo Länsivuori	Suzuki Motor Company	Suzuki	Retired	
Ret	(Belgium) Philippe Chaltin		Yamaha	Retired	
Ret	(Italy) Giacomo Agostini	Yamaha Motor NV	Yamaha	Retired	
Ret	(United Kingdom) Tom Herron		Yamaha	Retired	
Ret	(United Kingdom) Mick Grant	Boyer Team Kawasaki	Kawasaki	Retired	
Ret	(Italy) Gianfranco Bonera	MV Agusta	MV Agusta	Retired	
Ret	(United Kingdom) John Weeden		Yamaha	Retired	
Ret	(France) Bernard Fau		Yamaha	Retired	
Ret	(France) Olivier Chevallier		Yamaha	Retired	
Ret	(France) Philippe Bouzanne		Yamaha	Retired	

Previous race: 1975 Dutch TT	FIM Grand Prix World Championship; 1975 season	Next race: 1975 Swedish Grand Prix
Previous race: 1974 Belgian Grand Prix	Belgian Grand Prix	Next race: 1976 Belgian Grand Prix
