= 1975 Swedish motorcycle Grand Prix =

(Sweden) 1975 Swedish Grand Prix
Race details
- Race 9 of 12 races in the 1975 Grand Prix motorcycle racing season
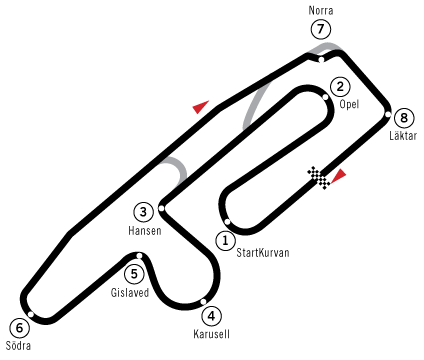
- Date: 20 July 1975
- Official name: Pommac Swedish TT
- Location: Scandinavian Raceway
- Course: Permanent racing facility; 4.031 km (2.505 mi)

500cc
Pole position
- Rider: (United Kingdom) Barry Sheene
- Time: 1:42.700
Fastest lap
- Rider: (United Kingdom) Barry Sheene
- Time: 1:41.850
Podium
- First: (United Kingdom) Barry Sheene
- Second: (United Kingdom) Phil Read
- Third: (United Kingdom) John Williams

350cc
Pole position
- Rider: None
Fastest lap
- Rider: None
Podium
- First: None
- Second: None
- Third: None

250cc
Pole position
- Rider: (Venezuela) Johnny Cecotto
- Time: 1:47.262
Fastest lap
- Rider: Unknown
Podium
- First: (Italy) Walter Villa
- Second: (Italy) Otello Buscherini
- Third: (Finland) Tapio Virtanen

125cc
Pole position
- Rider: (Sweden) Kent Andersson
- Time: 1:50.266
Fastest lap
- Rider: Unknown
Podium
- First: (Italy) Paolo Pileri
- Second: (Italy) Pier Paolo Bianchi
- Third: (Italy) Eugenio Lazzarini

50cc
Pole position
- Rider: (Italy) Eugenio Lazzarini
- Time: 2:00.343
Fastest lap
- Rider: Unknown
Podium
- First: (Italy) Eugenio Lazzarini
- Second: (Spain) Ángel Nieto
- Third: (Austria) Hans-Jürgen Hummel

The 1975 Swedish motorcycle Grand Prix was the ninth round of the 1975 Grand Prix motorcycle racing season. It took place on the weekend of 18–20 July 1975 at the Scandinavian Raceway.

== 500cc classification ==
Pos.	Rider	Team	Manufacturer	Time/Retired	Points
1	(United Kingdom) Barry Sheene	Suzuki Motor Company	Suzuki	48'30.600	15
2	(United Kingdom) Phil Read	MV Agusta	MV Agusta	+51.160	12
3	(United Kingdom) John Williams		Yamaha	+1'02.560	10
4	(Italy) Gianfranco Bonera	MV Agusta	MV Agusta	+1'12.200	8
5	(West Germany) Dieter Braun	Mitsui Maschinen	Yamaha	+1'12.560	6
6	(Finland) Pentti Korhonen		Yamaha	+1'18.660	5
7	(France) Gerard Choukroun		Harley-Davidson	+1'32.710	4
8	(Brazil) Edmar Ferreira	Carvalho Racing	Yamaha	+1 lap	3
9	(Australia) Jack Findlay		Yamaha	+1 lap	2
10	(Finland) Pekka Nurmi		Yamaha	+1 lap	1
11	(United Kingdom) Alex George		Yamaha	+1 lap	
12	(United Kingdom) Tom Herron		Yamaha	+1 lap	
13	(Italy) Mimmo Cazzaniga		Harley-Davidson	+1 lap	
14	(France) Olivier Chevallier		Yamaha	+1 lap	
15	(Sweden) Roland Nilsson	Zata Motor	Yamaha	+1 lap	
16	(Sweden) Ingemar Larssen		Yamaha	+1 lap	
17	(Norway) Bjorn Hasli		Yamaha	+1 lap	
Ret	(France) Patrick Pons	Equipe Sonauto BP Gauloises	Yamaha	Retired	
Ret	(United Kingdom) Mick Grant	Boyer Team Kawasaki	Kawasaki	Retired	
Ret	(United Kingdom) Barry Ditchburn	Boyer Team Kawasaki	Kawasaki	Retired	
Ret	(United Kingdom) John Newbold		Suzuki	Accident	
Ret	(United Kingdom) Chas Mortimer	Sarome Racing	Yamaha	Retired	
Ret	(United Kingdom) Charlie Williams		Yamaha	Retired	
Ret	(Austria) Karl Auer	Racing Team NO	Yamaha	Accident	
Ret	(Italy) Armando Toracca		Suzuki	Accident	
Ret	(Finland) Tapio Virtanen	Silja Line Racing	Yamaha	Retired	
Ret	(Switzerland) Philippe Coulon	GIR	Yamaha	Retired	
Ret	(Italy) Giacomo Agostini	Yamaha Motor NV	Yamaha	Accident	
Ret	(Sweden) Bo Granath		Husqvarna	Retired	
Ret	(Denmark) Børge Nielsen		Yamaha	Retired	
Ret	(Finland) Teuvo Länsivuori	Suzuki Motor Company	Suzuki	Accident	

Previous race: 1975 Belgian Grand Prix	FIM Grand Prix World Championship; 1975 season	Next race: 1975 Finnish Grand Prix
Previous race: 1974 Swedish Grand Prix	Swedish Grand Prix	Next race: 1976 Swedish Grand Prix
