= 1975 Nations motorcycle Grand Prix =

(Italy) 1975 Nations Grand Prix
Race details
- Race 5 of 12 races in the 1975 Grand Prix motorcycle racing season
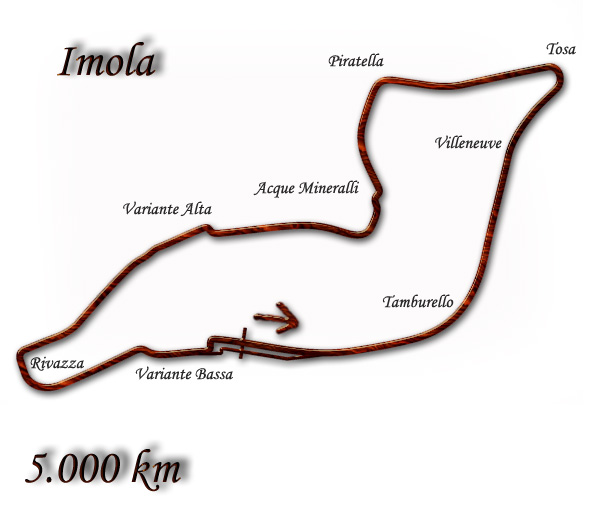
- Date: 18 May 1975
- Official name: Gran Premio delle Nazioni
- Location: Autodromo Dino Ferrari
- Course: Permanent racing facility; 5.040 km (3.132 mi)

500cc
Pole position
- Rider: (Italy) Giacomo Agostini
- Time: 1:59.510
Fastest lap
- Rider: (Italy) Giacomo Agostini
- Time: 1:57.200
Podium
- First: (Italy) Giacomo Agostini
- Second: (United Kingdom) Phil Read
- Third: (Japan) Hideo Kanaya

350cc
Pole position
- Rider: (Japan) Hideo Kanaya
- Time: 2:02.470
Fastest lap
- Rider: (Italy) Giacomo Agostini
- Time: 2:00.600
Podium
- First: (Venezuela) Johnny Cecotto
- Second: (Italy) Giacomo Agostini
- Third: (France) Patrick Pons

250cc
Pole position
- Rider: (Italy) Walter Villa
- Time: 2:04.430
Fastest lap
- Rider: (Italy) Walter Villa
- Time: 2:04.200
Podium
- First: (Italy) Walter Villa
- Second: (Venezuela) Johnny Cecotto
- Third: (France) Michel Rougerie

125cc
Pole position
- Rider: (Italy) Pier Paolo Bianchi
- Time: 2:10.120
Fastest lap
- Rider: (Italy) Pier Paolo Bianchi
- Time: 2:09.200
Podium
- First: (Italy) Paolo Pileri
- Second: (Italy) Pier Paolo Bianchi
- Third: (Netherlands) Henk van Kessel

50cc
Pole position
- Rider: (Italy) Eugenio Lazzarini
- Time: 2:27.380
Fastest lap
- Rider: (Italy) Eugenio Lazzarini
- Time: 2:26.900
Podium
- First: (Spain) Ángel Nieto
- Second: (Italy) Eugenio Lazzarini
- Third: (Switzerland) Stefan Dörflinger

The 1975 Nations motorcycle Grand Prix was the fifth round of the 1975 Grand Prix motorcycle racing season. It took place on the weekend of 16–18 May 1975 at the Autodromo Dino Ferrari.

== 500cc classification ==
Pos.	Rider	Team	Manufacturer	Time/Retired	Points
1	(Italy) Giacomo Agostini	Yamaha Motor NV	Yamaha	59'28.200	15
2	(United Kingdom) Phil Read	MV Agusta	MV Agusta	+1'00.800	12
3	(Japan) Hideo Kanaya	Yamaha Motor NV	Yamaha	+1'23.600	10
4	(Italy) Armando Toracca		MV Agusta	+1'48.400	8
5	(United Kingdom) Stan Woods		Suzuki	+1 lap	6
6	(United Kingdom) Alex George		Yamaha	+1 lap	5
7	(United Kingdom) John Newbold		Suzuki	+1 lap	4
8	(France) Thierry Tchernine		Yamaha	+1 lap	3
9	(France) Bernard Fau		Yamaha	+1 lap	2
10	(Switzerland) Rudolph Keller		Yamaha	+1 lap	1
11	(Austria) Max Wiener		Rotax	+1 lap	
12	(Italy) Nico Cereghini		Suzuki	+1 lap	
13	(Italy) Giorgio Gatti		Yamaha	+1 lap	
14	(Italy) Germano Paganini		Harley-Davidson	+1 lap	
15	(Italy) G Salsi		Yamaha	+1 lap	
16	(Italy) Sergio Baroncini		Ducati	+1 lap	
Ret	(France) Michel Rougerie	AMF Harley-Davidson	Harley-Davidson	Retired	
Ret	(Italy) Mimmo Cazzaniga		Kawasaki	Retired	
Ret	(France) Christian Leon	König Motorenbau	König	Retired	
Ret	(Italy) Virginio Ferrari		Paton	Retired	
Ret	(Italy) R Bianconcini		Suzuki	Retired	
Ret	(Italy) Roberto Gallina		Suzuki	Retired	
Ret	(Brazil) Adu Celso-Santos	Carvalho Racing	Yamaha	Retired	
Ret	(United Kingdom) Barry Sheene	Suzuki Motor Company	Suzuki	Retired	
Ret	(Italy) G Barzanti		Yamaha	Retired	
Ret	(Italy) Guido Mandracci		Yamaha	Retired	
Ret	(Australia) Jack Findlay		Yamaha	Retired	
Ret	(Italy) Mario Necchi		Yamaha	Retired	
Ret	(Finland) Pentti Korhonen		Yamaha	Retired	
DNS	(Finland) Teuvo Länsivuori	Suzuki Motor Company	Suzuki	Did not start	
DNS	(United Kingdom) Chas Mortimer	Sarome Racing	Yamaha	Did not start	

Previous race: 1975 German Grand Prix	FIM Grand Prix World Championship; 1975 season	Next race: 1975 Isle of Man TT
Previous race: 1974 Nations Grand Prix	Nations Grand Prix	Next race: 1976 Nations Grand Prix
