= 1976 Isle of Man TT =

Annual motorcycle racing event

Race details
- Race 5 of 12 races in the 1976 Grand Prix motorcycle racing season
- Date: 7–12 June 1976
- Official name: Isle of Man Tourist Trophy
- Location: Snaefell Mountain Course
- Course: Public roads; 60.725 km (37.733 mi)

500cc
Fastest lap
| Rider | (United Kingdom) John Williams | Suzuki |
| Time | 20:09.800 | |
Podium
| First | (United Kingdom) Tom Herron | Yamaha |
| Second | (United Kingdom) Ian Richards | Yamaha |
| Third | (United Kingdom) Billy Guthrie | Yamaha |

350cc
Fastest lap
| Rider | (United Kingdom) Tony Rutter | Yamaha |
| Time | 20:49.600 | |
Podium
| First | (United Kingdom) Chas Mortimer | Yamaha |
| Second | (United Kingdom) Tony Rutter | Yamaha |
| Third | (United Kingdom) Billy Guthrie | Yamaha |

250cc
Fastest lap
| Rider | (United Kingdom) Tom Herron | Yamaha |
| Time | 21:27.800 | |
Podium
| First | (United Kingdom) Tom Herron | Yamaha |
| Second | (Japan) Takazumi Katayama | Yamaha |
| Third | (United Kingdom) Chas Mortimer | Yamaha |

Sidecar (B2A)
Fastest lap
| Rider | (West Germany) Siegfried Schauzu | Aro |
| Passenger | (West Germany) Wolfgang Kalauch | |
| Time | 23:13.000 | |
Podium
| First rider | (West Germany) Rolf Steinhausen | Busch König |
| First passenger | (West Germany) Sepp Huber | |
| Second rider | (United Kingdom) Dick Greasley | Chell Yamaha |
| Second passenger | (United Kingdom) Cliff Holland | |
| Third rider | (United Kingdom) Mac Hobson | Ham Yamaha |
| Third passenger | (United Kingdom) Mick Burns | |

The 1976 Isle of Man TT was the fifth round of the 1976 Grand Prix motorcycle racing season held on the Isle of Man between 7 June and 12 June 1976. The racing would be the final time the Isle of Man TT was an official round on the Grand Prix calendar. Although it had once been the most prestigious race of the year, racing around the Snaefell Mountain Course had been increasingly boycotted by the eras' top riders over safety concerns.

Bowing to pressure for increased rider safety at racing events, FIM moved the Grand Prix to England in 1977 with the British Grand Prix being held at the Silverstone Circuit. However the Isle of Man TT, as it had before 1949 continued as a stand-alone event.

== Senior TT (500cc) classification ==
| Pos. | No. | Rider | Team | Manufacturer | Time/Retired | Points |
|---|---|---|---|---|---|---|
| 1 | 15 | (United Kingdom) Tom Herron | | Yamaha | 2:09'10.000 | 15 |
| 2 | 25 | (United Kingdom) Ian Richards | | Yamaha | +3.400 | 12 |
| 3 | 4 | (United Kingdom) Billy Guthrie | Danfay | Yamaha | +23.000 | 10 |
| 4 | 17 | (Japan) Takazumi Katayama | Takazumi Katayama Sarome Team | Yamaha | +28.200 | 8 |
| 5 | 23 | (United Kingdom) Roger Nicholls | | Yamaha | +1'05.600 | 6 |
| 6 | 26 | (South Africa) Jon Ekerold | Padgett's Motorcycles | Yamaha | +2'02.400 | 5 |
| 7 | 2 | (United Kingdom) John Williams | Texaco Heron Team Suzuki | Suzuki | +2'26.800 | 4 |
| 8 | 41 | (United Kingdom) Gordon Pantall | | Yamaha | +2'46.800 | 3 |
| 9 | 22 | (United Kingdom) John Weeden | | Yamaha | +3'45.200 | 2 |
| 10 | 30 | (United Kingdom) Bill Smith | | Yamaha | +4'19.600 | 1 |
| 11 | ?? | (United Kingdom) Paul Cott | | Yamaha | +4'36.800 | |
| 12 | ?? | (United Kingdom) Alan Jackson | | Sparton | +4'58.200 | |
| 13 | ?? | (United Kingdom) Denis Casement | | Yamaha | +5'59.600 | |
| 14 | ?? | (United Kingdom) Gerry Mateer | | Yamaha | +7'20.000 | |
| 15 | ?? | (United Kingdom) Donal Cormican | | Yamaha | +7'15.800 | |
| 16 | ?? | (United Kingdom) James Scott | | Yamaha | +7'18.400 | |
| 17 | ?? | (United Kingdom) Bill Simpson | | Yamaha | +7'52.200 | |
| 18 | ?? | (United Kingdom) Joey Dunlop | | Yamaha | +8'39.000 | |
| 19 | ?? | (United Kingdom) Roger Nott | | Yamaha | +9'15.600 | |
| 20 | ?? | (United Kingdom) Ernie Coates | | Yamaha | +9'51.800 | |
| 21 | ?? | (United Kingdom) Mal Kirwan | | Yamaha | +10'01.600 | |
| 22 | ?? | (United Kingdom) Dave Danks | | Yamaha | +10'48.000 | |
| 23 | ?? | (United Kingdom) Bernie Toleman | | Suzuki | +11'25.400 | |
| 24 | ?? | (New Zealand) Stuart Jones | | Yamaha | +11'45.000 | |
| 25 | ?? | (United Kingdom) Malcolm Lucas | | Norton | +13'09.200 | |
| 26 | ?? | (United Kingdom) Bill Ingham | | Yamaha | +13'51.000 | |
| 27 | ?? | (United Kingdom) Roy Jeffreys | | Yamaha | +14'44.800 | |
| 28 | ?? | (United Kingdom) Richard Pipes | | Yamaha | +15'31.400 | |
| 29 | ?? | (United Kingdom) Trevor Steele | | Yamaha | +15'33.600 | |
| 30 | ?? | (United Kingdom) Bill Bowman | | Yamaha | +15'46.600 | |
| 31 | ?? | (West Germany) Gerhard Vogt | | Yamaha | +21'46.400 | |
| 32 | ?? | (United Kingdom) John Lavender | | Norton | +22'14.600 | |
| 33 | ?? | (United Kingdom) Walter Dawson | | Seeley | +22'49.000 | |
| 34 | ?? | (United Kingdom) Tom Robinson | | Yamaha | +23'10.800 | |
| 35 | ?? | (United Kingdom) Chris Neve | | Yamaha | +26'22.400 | |
| 36 | ?? | (United Kingdom) Chris Hart | | Yamaha | +29'01.000 | |
| Ret | 10 | (Australia) Jack Findlay | Jack Findlay Racing | Suzuki | Retired | |
| Ret | ?? | (United Kingdom) Steve Tonkin | | Yamaha | Retired | |
| Ret | ?? | (United Kingdom) Mick Chatterton | | Yamaha | Retired | |
| Ret | ?? | (West Germany) Bert Kleimaier | | Suzuki | Retired | |
| Ret | ?? | (United Kingdom) Malcolm Moffat | | Yamaha | Retired | |
| Ret | ?? | (United Kingdom) Keith Martin | | Yamaha | Retired | |
| Ret | ?? | (United Kingdom) Brian Warburton | | Suzuki | Retired | |
| Ret | ?? | (United Kingdom) David Hughes | | Arter Matchless | Retired | |
| Ret | ?? | (United Kingdom) Mick Grant | | Kawasaki | Retired | |
| Ret | ?? | (United Kingdom) Derek Mortimer | | Yamaha | Retired | |
| Ret | ?? | (United Kingdom) Alan Lawton | | Norton | Retired | |
| Ret | ?? | (United Kingdom) Martyn Sharpe | | Sparton | Retired | |
| Ret | ?? | (United Kingdom) Mick Poxon | | Sparton | Retired | |
| Ret | ?? | (United Kingdom) Stan Woods | | Suzuki | Retired | |
| Ret | ?? | (United Kingdom) Tom Loughridge | | Suzuki | Retired | |
| Ret | ?? | (United Kingdom) Roger Bowler | | Suzuki | Retired | |
| Ret | ?? | (United Kingdom) Eddie Roberts | | Yamaha | Retired | |
| Ret | ?? | (United Kingdom) Geoff Barry | | Yamaha | Retired | |
| Ret | ?? | (United Kingdom) Graham Waring | | Yamaha | Retired | |
| Ret | ?? | (Republic of Ireland) Sam McClements | | Yamaha | Retired | |
| Ret | ?? | (United Kingdom) Henry McEwan | | Yamaha | Retired | |
| Ret | ?? | (United Kingdom) Tony Rutter | | Yamaha | Retired | |
| Ret | ?? | (United Kingdom) Bill Fulton | | Yamaha | Retired | |
| Ret | ?? | (United Kingdom) Brendan Ryan | | Yamaha | Retired | |
| Ret | ?? | (United Kingdom) Alex George | Hermetite Racing International | Yamaha | Retired | |
| Ret | ?? | (Australia) Les Kenny | | Yamaha | Retired | |
| Ret | ?? | (United Kingdom) Noel Clegg | | Yamaha | Retired | |
| Ret | ?? | (United Kingdom) Chas Mortimer | Takazumi Katayama Sarome Team | Yamaha | Injury | |
| Ret | ?? | (West Germany) Hans-Otto Butenuth | | Yamaha | Retired | |
| Ret | ?? | (United Kingdom) Limer McCabe | | Yamaha | Retired | |
| Ret | ?? | (United Kingdom) Charlie Williams | | Yamaha | Retired | |
| Ret | ?? | (United Kingdom) Derek Chatterton | | Yamaha | Retired | |
| Ret | ?? | (United Kingdom) David Nixon | | Yamaha | Retired | |
| Ret | ?? | (United Kingdom) Neil Tuxworth | | Yamaha | Retired | |
| Ret | ?? | (United Kingdom) Brian Peters | | Yamaha | Retired | |
| Ret | ?? | (United Kingdom) Bill Henderson | | Yamaha | Retired | |
| Ret | ?? | (United Kingdom) Bernard Murray | | Yamaha | Retired | |
| Ret | ?? | (United Kingdom) Kevin Cowley | | Yamaha | Retired | |
| DNS | ?? | (United Kingdom) Percy Tait | | Suzuki | Did not start | |

== Junior TT (350 cc) classification ==
| Pos | No. | Rider | Manufacturer | Laps | Time | Points |
|---|---|---|---|---|---|---|
| 1 | 5 | (United Kingdom) Chas Mortimer | Yamaha | 5 | 1:46:00.2 | 15 |
| 2 | 6 | (United Kingdom) Tony Rutter | Yamaha | 5 | +6.8 | 12 |
| 3 | 14 | (United Kingdom) Billy Guthrie | Yamaha | 5 | +3:01.6 | 10 |
| 4 | 10 | (United Kingdom) Martin Sharpe | Yamaha | 5 | +3:02.0 | 8 |
| 5 | 28 | (United Kingdom) John Weeden | Yamaha | 5 | +3:08.4 | 6 |
| 6 | 3 | (United Kingdom) Derek Chatterton | Yamaha | 5 | +3:56.4 | 5 |
| 7 | 16 | (United Kingdom) Neil Tuxworth | Yamaha | 5 | +4:05.4 | 4 |
| 8 | 2 | (Australia) Jack Findlay | Yamaha | 5 | +4:28.4 | 3 |
| 9 | 12 | (Japan) Takazumi Katayama | Yamaha | 5 | +4:38.6 | 2 |
| 10 | 56 | (United Kingdom) Sam McClements | Yamaha | 5 | +5:36.4 | 1 |
76 starters in total, 44 finishers

== Lightweight TT (250 cc) classification ==
| Pos | No. | Rider | Manufacturer | Laps | Time | Points |
|---|---|---|---|---|---|---|
| 1 | 4 | (United Kingdom) Tom Herron | Yamaha | 4 | 1:27:26.8 | 15 |
| 2 | 6 | (Japan) Takazumi Katayama | Yamaha | 4 | +25.4 | 12 |
| 3 | 1 | (United Kingdom) Chas Mortimer | Yamaha | 4 | +1:16.4 | 10 |
| 4 | 2 | (United Kingdom) Tony Rutter | Yamaha | 4 | +2:06.4 | 8 |
| 5 | 7 | (United Kingdom) Eddie Roberts | Yamaha | 4 | +2:59.0 | 6 |
| 6 | 3 | (United Kingdom) Alex George | Yamaha | 4 | +3:20.4 | 5 |
| 7 | 8 | (United Kingdom) John Weeden | Yamaha | 4 | +3:21.6 | 4 |
| 8 | 20 | (United Kingdom) Ian Richards | Yamaha | 4 | +4:15.6 | 3 |
| 9 | 32 | (United Kingdom) Denis Casement | Yamaha | 4 | +4:57.2 | 2 |
| 10 | 10 | (United Kingdom) Neil Tuxworth | Yamaha | 4 | +4:59.2 | 1 |
55 starters in total, 44 finishers

== 500 cc Sidecar TT classification ==
| Pos | No. | Rider | Passenger | Manufacturer | Laps | Time | Points |
|---|---|---|---|---|---|---|---|
| 1 | 1 | (Germany) Rolf Steinhausen | (Germany) Sepp Huber | Busch-König | 3 | 1:10:26.0 | 15 |
| 2 | 10 | (United Kingdom) Dick Greasley | (United Kingdom) Cliff Holland | Chell Yamaha | 3 | +33.8 | 12 |
| 3 | 8 | (United Kingdom) Mac Hobson | (United Kingdom) Mick Burns | Ham Yamaha | 3 | +43.6 | 10 |
| 4 | 9 | (Germany) Siegfried Schauzu | (Germany) Wolfgang Kalauch | Aro | 3 | +2:55.6 | 8 |
| 5 | 24 | (United Kingdom) Jeff Gawley | (United Kingdom) Ken Birch | Yamaha | 3 | +3:13.8 | 6 |
| 6 | 28 | (United Kingdom) Graham Milton | (United Kingdom) John Brushwood | British Magnum | 3 | +4:50.4 | 5 |
| 7 | 3 | (Germany) Helmut Schilling | (Germany) Rainer Gundel | Aro | 3 | +4:52.8 | 4 |
| 8 | 26 | (Australia) Alex Campbell | (Australia) Russell Campbell | Yamaha | 3 | +5:22.6 | 3 |
| 9 | 37 | (Germany) Walter Ohrmann | (Germany) Bernd Grube | Yamaha | 3 | +5:23.0 | 5 |
| 10 | 34 | (United Kingdom) Tony Wakefield | (United Kingdom) Colin Newbold | British Magnum | 3 | +5:26.6 | 1 |
64 starters in total, 36 finishers

== Non-championship races ==
=== 1000 cc Sidecar TT ===
| Pos | No. | Rider | Passenger | Manufacturer | Laps | Time |
|---|---|---|---|---|---|---|
| 1 | 1 | (United Kingdom) Mac Hobson | (United Kingdom) Mick Burns | Ham Yamaha | 3 | 1:09:27.8 |
| 2 | 2 | (Germany) Siegfried Schauzu | (Germany) Wolfgang Kalauch | BMW | 3 | +44.6 |
| 3 | 3 | (United Kingdom) Dick Greasley | (United Kingdom) Cliff Holland | Chell Yamaha | 3 | +1:22.8 |
| 4 | 5 | (Germany) Rolf Steinhausen | (Germany) Sepp Huber | Busch-König | 3 | +1:33.0 |
| 5 | 18 | (Germany) Otto Haller | (Germany) Erich Hasselbeck | BMW | 3 | +5:15.6 |
| 6 | 36 | (Australia) Alex Campbell | (Australia) Russell Campbell | Yamaha | 3 | +5:43.6 |
| 7 | 37 | (United Kingdom) Bill Hodgkins | (United Kingdom) John Parkins | Yamaha | 3 | +8:06.8 |
| 8 | 55 | (United Kingdom) Gordon Fox | (United Kingdom) Hugh Sanderson | Yamaha | 3 | +8:31.2 |
| 9 | 10 | (Germany) Gustav Pape | (Germany) Franz Kallenberg | König | 3 | +8:41.8 |
| 10 | 35 | (United Kingdom) Nigel Rollason | (United Kingdom) Michael Coomber | Devimead BSA | 3 | +9:10.8 |
65 starters in total, 29 finishers
Fastest lap : 22:38.8 (Hobson/Burns)

=== 1000 cc Open Classic TT ===
| Pos | No. | Rider | Manufacturer | Laps | Time |
|---|---|---|---|---|---|
| 1 | 1 | (United Kingdom) John Williams | Suzuki | 6 | 2:05:33.0 |
| 2 | 11 | (United Kingdom) Alex George | Yamaha | 6 | +1:24.8 |
| 3 | 8 | (United Kingdom) Tony Rutter | Yamaha | 6 | +2:46.6 |
| 4 | 14 | (United Kingdom) Charlie Williams | Yamaha | 6 | +3:09.4 |
| 5 | 16 | (United Kingdom) Tom Herron | Yamaha | 6 | +4:09.2 |
| 6 | 19 | (United Kingdom) Eddie Roberts | Yamaha | 6 | +4:22.4 |
| 7 | 23 | (United Kingdom) Ian Richards | Yamaha | 6 | +4:45.0 |
| 8 | 25 | (United Kingdom) Bill Smith | Yamaha | 6 | +7:15.4 |
| 9 | 34 | (United Kingdom) Gordon Pantall | Yamaha | 6 | +7:24.8 |
| 10 | 36 | (United Kingdom) Gerry Mateer | Yamaha | 6 | +7:41.4 |
61 starters in total, 34 finishers
Fastest lap : 20:32.4 (John Williams)

=== Production TT ===
| Pos | No. | Riders | | Manufacturer | Laps | Time |
|---|---|---|---|---|---|---|
| 1 | 32 | (United Kingdom) Bill Simpson | (United Kingdom) Chas Mortimer | Yamaha | 10 | 4:05:09.8 |
| 2 | 39 | (United Kingdom) Tony Rutter | (United Kingdom) Dave Hughes | Suzuki | 10 | +1:28.0 |
| 3 | 24 | (United Kingdom) Frank Rutter | (United Kingdom) Mick Poxon | Honda | 10 | +3:05.6 |
| 4 | 34 | (United Kingdom) John Kidson | (United Kingdom) Bill Henderson | Honda | 10 | +3:38.4 |
| 5 | 59 | (Germany) Helmut Dähne | (Germany) Hans-Otto Butenuth | BMW | 10 | +3:41.0 |
| 6 | 37 | (United Kingdom) Keith Martin | (United Kingdom) John Riley | Yamaha | 10 | +5:45.6 |
| 7 | 2 | (United Kingdom) Nigel Rollason | (United Kingdom) Les Trotter | Suzuki | 10 | +6:28.4 |
| 8 | 50 | (United Kingdom) Doug Randall | (United Kingdom) John Lavender | Yamaha | 10 | +6:40.0 |
| 9 | 45 | (United Kingdom) Dick Hunter | (United Kingdom) Mal Kirwan | Suzuki | 10 | +6:41.0 |
| 10 | 21 | (United Kingdom) Keith Trubshaw | (United Kingdom) Jack Higham | Honda | 10 | +7:02.4 |
75 starters in total, 41 finishers
Fastest lap : 21:57.0 (Steve Tonkin/Roger Nicholls)

| Previous race: 1976 Yugoslavian Grand Prix | FIM Grand Prix World Championship; 1976 season | Next race: 1976 Dutch TT |
| Previous race: 1975 Isle of Man TT | Isle of Man TT / British Grand Prix | Next race: 1977 British Grand Prix; Silverstone |
