= 1975 Dutch TT =

(Netherlands) 1975 Dutch TT
Race details
- Race 7 of 12 races in the 1975 Grand Prix motorcycle racing season
- Date: 28 June 1975
- Official name: Dutch TT Assen
- Location: Circuit van Drenthe
- Course: Permanent racing facility; 7.700 km (4.785 mi)

500cc
Pole position
- Rider: (United Kingdom) Barry Sheene
- Time: 2:58.400
Fastest lap
- Rider: (United Kingdom) Barry Sheene
- Time: 2:55.500
Podium
- First: (United Kingdom) Barry Sheene
- Second: (Italy) Giacomo Agostini
- Third: (United Kingdom) Phil Read

350cc
Pole position
- Rider: (Italy) Walter Villa
Fastest lap
- Rider: (Venezuela) Johnny Cecotto
- Time: 3:01.400
Podium
- First: (West Germany) Dieter Braun
- Second: (Finland) Pentti Korhonen
- Third: (United Kingdom) Alex George

250cc
Pole position
- Rider: (Italy) Walter Villa
- Time: 3:07.100
Fastest lap
- Rider: (Italy) Walter Villa
- Time: 3:04.000
Podium
- First: (Italy) Walter Villa
- Second: (France) Michel Rougerie
- Third: (West Germany) Dieter Braun

125cc
Pole position
- Rider: (Italy) Paolo Pileri
- Time: 3:12.400
Fastest lap
- Rider: (Italy) Paolo Pileri
- Time: 3:12.500
Podium
- First: (Italy) Paolo Pileri
- Second: (Italy) Pier Paolo Bianchi
- Third: (Switzerland) Bruno Kneubühler

50cc
Pole position
- Rider: (Italy) Eugenio Lazzarini
- Time: 3:36.300
Fastest lap
- Rider: (Italy) Eugenio Lazzarini
- Time: 3:32.100
Podium
- First: (Spain) Ángel Nieto
- Second: (West Germany) Herbert Rittberger
- Third: (Italy) Eugenio Lazzarini

The 1975 Dutch TT was the seventh round of the 1975 Grand Prix motorcycle racing season. It took place on the weekend of 26–28 June 1975 at the Circuit van Drenthe located in Assen, Netherlands.

== 500cc classification ==
| Pos. | Rider | Team | Manufacturer | Time/Retired | Points |
|---|---|---|---|---|---|
| 1 | (United Kingdom) Barry Sheene | Suzuki Motor Company | Suzuki | 48'01.000 | 15 |
| 2 | (Italy) Giacomo Agostini | Yamaha Motor NV | Yamaha | 48'01.000 | 12 |
| 3 | (United Kingdom) Phil Read | MV Agusta | MV Agusta | +48.700 | 10 |
| 4 | (United Kingdom) John Newbold | | Suzuki | +1 lap | 8 |
| 5 | (Finland) Teuvo Länsivuori | Suzuki Motor Company | Suzuki | +1 lap | 6 |
| 6 | (Italy) Gianfranco Bonera | MV Agusta | MV Agusta | +1 lap | 5 |
| 7 | (United Kingdom) John Williams | | Yamaha | +1 lap | 4 |
| 8 | (Switzerland) Hans Stadelmann | | Yamaha | +1 lap | 3 |
| 9 | (Austria) Karl Auer | Racing Team NO | Yamaha | +1 lap | 2 |
| 10 | (Netherlands) Piet van der Wal | | Yamaha | +1 lap | 1 |
| 11 | (West Germany) Helmut Kassner | | Yamaha | +1 lap | |
| 12 | (United Kingdom) Cliff Carr | Harris Everton Racing | Yamaha | +1 lap | |
| 13 | (Netherlands) Rob Bron | | Suzuki | +1 lap | |
| 14 | (Republic of Ireland) Tony Rutter | | Yamaha | +1 lap | |
| 15 | (Netherlands) Dick Alblas | | König | +1 lap | |
| 16 | (United Kingdom) Steve Ellis | | Yamaha | +1 lap | |
| 17 | (West Germany) Hans-Otto Butenuth | | Yamaha | +1 lap | |
| 18 | (United Kingdom) Charlie Williams | | Yamaha | +1 lap | |
| Ret | (United Kingdom) Alex George | | Yamaha | Retired | |
| Ret | (France) Christian Leon | König Motorenbau | König | Retired | |
| Ret | (France) Bernard Fau | | Yamaha | Retired | |
| Ret | (Canada) Yvon Duhamel | | Kawasaki | Retired | |
| Ret | (West Germany) Horst Lahfeld | | König | Retired | |
| Ret | (United Kingdom) Mick Grant | Boyer Team Kawasaki | Kawasaki | Retired | |
| Ret | (United Kingdom) Barry Ditchburn | Boyer Team Kawasaki | Kawasaki | Retired | |
| Ret | (Netherlands) Wil Hartog | | Yamaha | Retired | |
| Ret | (Netherlands) Jan van Disseldorp | | Yamaha | Retired | |
| Ret | (France) Thierry Tchernine | | Yamaha | Retired | |
| Ret | (South Africa) Alan North | | Yamaha | Retired | |
| Ret | (Australia) Jack Findlay | | Yamaha | Accident | |
| Ret | (France) Patrick Pons | Equipe Sonauto BP Gauloises | Yamaha | Accident | |

| Previous race: 1975 Isle of Man TT | FIM Grand Prix World Championship; 1975 season | Next race: 1975 Belgian Grand Prix |
| Previous race: 1974 Dutch TT | Dutch TT | Next race: 1976 Dutch TT |
