= 1975 Finnish motorcycle Grand Prix =

(Finland) 1975 Finnish Grand Prix
Race details
- Race 10 of 12 races in the 1975 Grand Prix motorcycle racing season
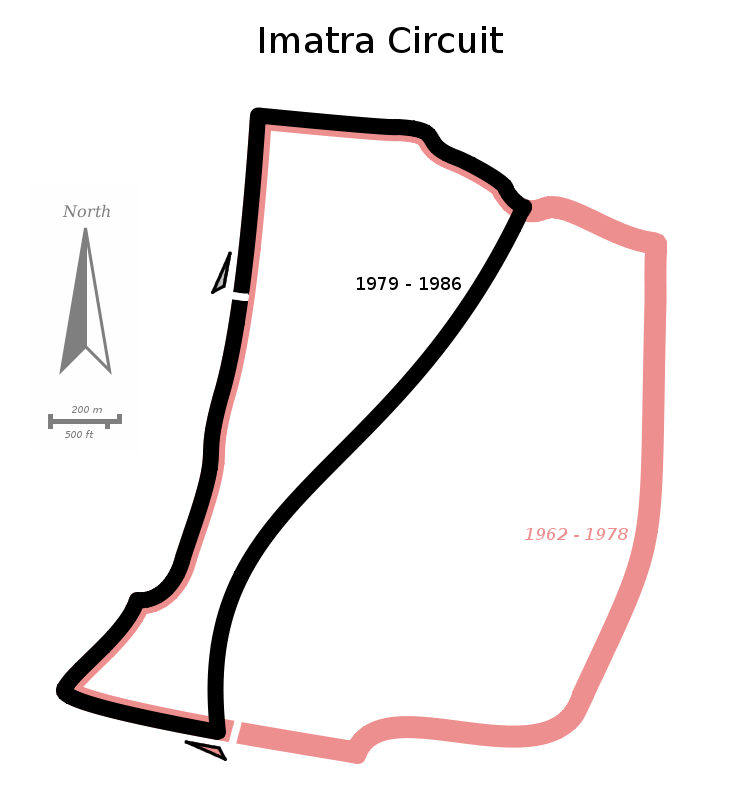
- Date: 27 July 1975
- Official name: Imatranajo
- Location: Imatra Circuit
- Course: Permanent racing facility; 6.030 km (3.747 mi)

500cc
Pole position
- Rider: (Italy) Gianfranco Bonera
- Time: 2:17.100
Fastest lap
- Rider: (Italy) Giacomo Agostini
- Time: 2:15.500
Podium
- First: (Italy) Giacomo Agostini
- Second: (Finland) Teuvo Länsivuori
- Third: (Australia) Jack Findlay

350cc
Pole position
- Rider: (Venezuela) Johnny Cecotto
- Time: 2:22.600
Fastest lap
- Rider: Unknown
Podium
- First: (Venezuela) Johnny Cecotto
- Second: (Italy) Giacomo Agostini
- Third: (France) Patrick Pons

250cc
Pole position
- Rider: (France) Michel Rougerie
- Time: 2:24.600
Fastest lap
- Rider: Unknown
Podium
- First: (France) Michel Rougerie
- Second: (Venezuela) Johnny Cecotto
- Third: (Italy) Otello Buscherini

125cc
Pole position
- Rider: None
Fastest lap
- Rider: None
Podium
- First: None
- Second: None
- Third: None

50cc
Pole position
- Rider: (Italy) Eugenio Lazzarini
- Time: 2:52.900
Fastest lap
- Rider: Unknown
Podium
- First: (Spain) Ángel Nieto
- Second: (Italy) Eugenio Lazzarini
- Third: (West Germany) Rudolf Kunz

The 1975 Finnish motorcycle Grand Prix was the tenth round of the 1975 Grand Prix motorcycle racing season. It took place on the weekend of 25–27 July 1975 at the Imatra Circuit.

== 500cc classification ==
Pos.	Rider	Team	Manufacturer	Time/Retired	Points
1	(Italy) Giacomo Agostini	Yamaha Motor NV	Yamaha	49'25.700	15
2	(Finland) Teuvo Länsivuori	Suzuki Motor Company	Suzuki	+53.100	12
3	(Australia) Jack Findlay		Yamaha	+1'03.000	10
4	(United Kingdom) Chas Mortimer	Sarome Racing	Yamaha	+1 lap	8
5	(United Kingdom) Steve Ellis		Yamaha	+1 lap	6
6	(West Germany) Horst Lahfeld		König	+1 lap	5
7	(Belgium) Thierry van der Veken		Yamaha	+1 lap	4
8	(Sweden) Johnny Bengtsson		Yamaha	+1 lap	3
9	(Norway) Björn Hasli		Yamaha	+1 lap	2
10	(Finland) Seppo Kangasniemi		Yamaha	+1 lap	1
11	(Finland) Pentti Lehtela		Yamaha	+1 lap	
12	(United Kingdom) Neil Tuxworth		Yamaha	+1 lap	
13	(Finland) Ari Heikkila		Yamaha	+1 lap	
Ret	(United Kingdom) Phil Read	MV Agusta	MV Agusta	Retired	
Ret	(Italy) Gianfranco Bonera	MV Agusta	MV Agusta	Accident	
Ret	(United Kingdom) Barry Sheene	Suzuki Motor Company	Suzuki	Retired	
Ret	(United Kingdom) Alex George		Yamaha	Retired	
Ret	(United Kingdom) Charlie Williams		Yamaha	Accident	
Ret	(Brazil) Edmar Ferreira	Carvalho Racing	Yamaha	Retired	
Ret	(United Kingdom) John Williams		Yamaha	Retired	
Ret	(Finland) Tapio Virtanen	Silja Line Racing	Yamaha	Retired	
DNS	(Switzerland) Philippe Coulon	GIR	Yamaha	Did not start	

Previous race: 1975 Swedish Grand Prix	FIM Grand Prix World Championship; 1975 season	Next race: 1975 Czechoslovak Grand Prix
Previous race: 1974 Finnish Grand Prix	Finnish Grand Prix	Next race: 1976 Finnish Grand Prix
