= 1975 Grand Prix motorcycle racing season =

Sports season

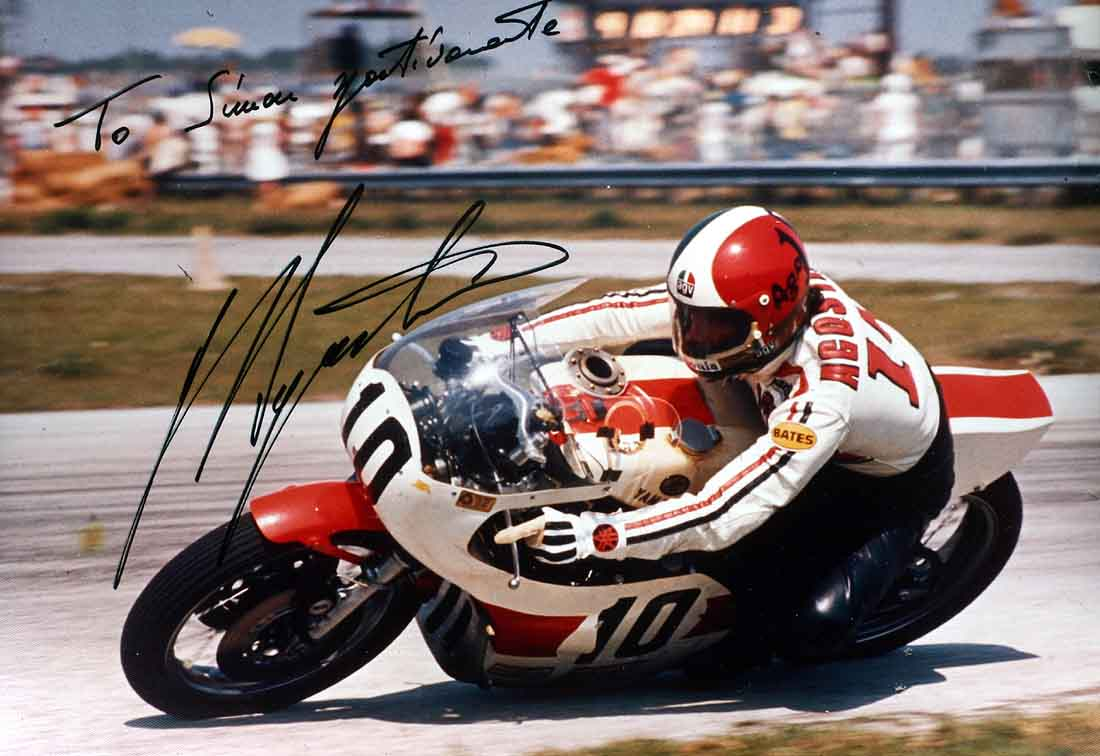
Giacomo Agostini became the 1975 500cc World Champion riding for the Yamaha factory racing team.

The 1975 Grand Prix motorcycle racing season was the 27th F.I.M. Road Racing World Championship season.

== Season summary ==
The battle for supremacy of the 500cc class between the defending champion Phil Read (MV Agusta) and Giacomo Agostini (Yamaha) was not decided until the tenth and final round of the series, where Agostini prevailed to claim a record fifteenth and final World Championship of his career. Agostini's victory on the Yamaha marked the first time in the history of Grand Prix motorcycle racing that a two-stroke machine had won the premier division, as well as the first world title won on a motorcycle using racing slick tires. It also marked the first time that a Japanese manufacturer had won the 500cc class.

Yamaha fielded Agostini and teammate Hideo Kanaya riding Yamaha YZR500 motorcycles with an upgraded chassis that featured the revolutionary single shock absorber rear suspension they had used to win the 1973 FIM Motocross World Championship. The MV Agusta team signed Armando Toracca as Read's teammate riding the four-stroke MV 500. Suzuki continued to improve their Suzuki RG 500 with Barry Sheene claiming two Grand Prix victories in Holland and Sweden. John Newbold was Sheene's teammate on the Suzuki team. Sheene crashed heavily while practicing for the pre-season Daytona 200 and would not return to full health until mid-season.

The 1975 season began with Agostini and Kanaya taking first and second in France, relegating Read to third place. Agostini then failed to finish in Austria, as Kanaya took the victory ahead of Teuvo Länsivuori (Suzuki) with Read finishing in third place. Kanaya scored an impressive double victory in Austria where he won both the 350cc and 500cc classes to become the first Japanese competitor to win Grand Prix races in either class. Agostini then won two consecutive races in Germany and Italy, relegating Read to second place each time. Mick Grant (Kawasaki) won the fifth round at the 1975 Isle of Man TT as most of the championship contenders continued to boycott the event over safety concerns. Yamaha would recall Kanaya to Japan at mid-season for testing duties while, Gianfranco Bonera replaced Toracca on the MV Agusta team at Round 6 in hopes of offering more support for Read.

Sheene recovered from his Daytona crash to win the first 500cc victory of his career at the 1975 Dutch TT with a dramatic, last corner pass around the outside of Agostini. Both competitors received the same race time while Read finished in third place. Read won the Belgian Grand Prix then finished second to Sheene in Sweden to take the championship points lead as Agostini suffered two consecutive mechanical failures. Agostini recovered to win the Finnish Grand Prix and retake the points lead as Read's motorcycle had a mechanical failure and failed to finish the race.

Agostini's victory gave him an eleven-point lead going into the final round in Czechoslovakia. In order for Read to overtake Agostini and win the World Championship, he needed to win the final race with Agostini placing no higher than eighth. Read did win the final race however, Agostini finished in second place to clinch the World Championship for the Yamaha team. Read placed second in the final standings while Agostini's Yamaha teammate Kanaya, came in third despite only competing during the first half of the season.

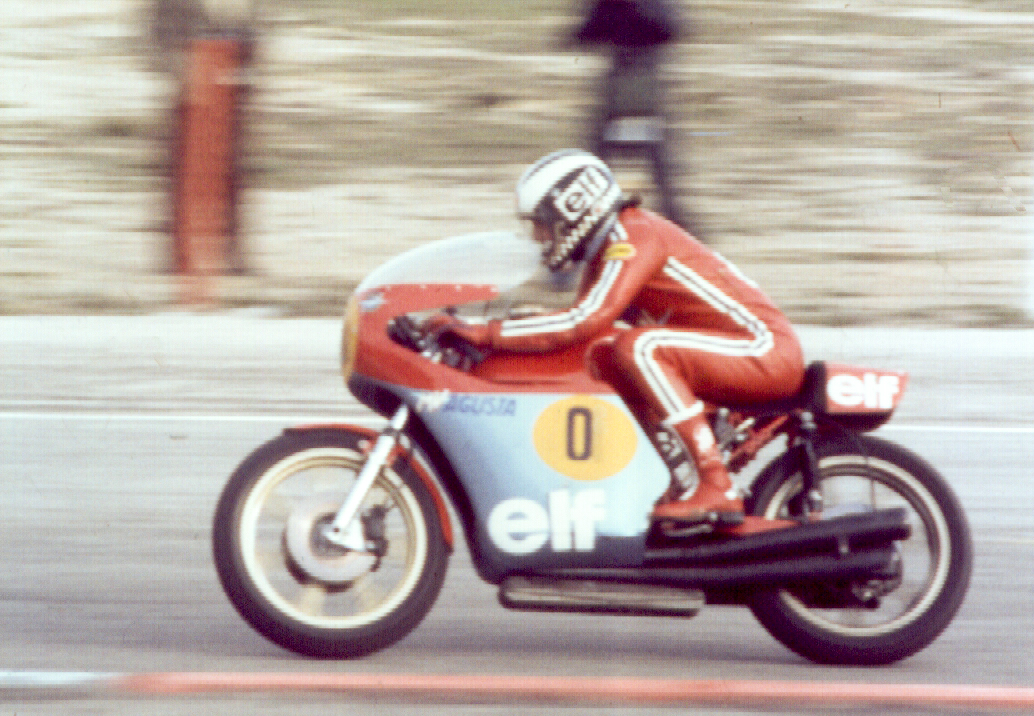
Phil Read in action on an MV Agusta 500 during the 1975 French Grand Prix.

Read actually grossed more points overall than Agostini during the season but fell victim to FIM scoring rules at the time which only recognized a competitor's best six results. Read's loss marked the end of MV Agusta's streak of 17 consecutive 500 Class World Championships dating back to 1958. The company's focus had turned to the aviation industry after the death of Count Domenico Agusta in February 1971. The Count's passion for motorcycle racing had been the driving force behind the MV Agusta team, and without his presence, the racing team's importance within the company began to wither. The last remaining manufacturer to compete with four-stroke machinery, the MV Agusta team withdrew from the World Championships after the 1975 season.

Agostini's string of seven consecutive 350cc World Championships came to an end in 1975 when he finished second to teenage prodigy Johnny Cecotto. Cecotto was relatively unknown at the beginning of the season but soon rose to prominence at the season-opening round in France, where he won the 250cc Grand Prix, then defeated Agostini by 20 seconds to win the 350cc Grand Prix. Cecotto had secured only enough budget to compete in the first few rounds of the World Championships however, after his spectacular debut, he secured additional financial sponsorship to compete in all 10 rounds. Yamaha also provided Agostini's 1974 Yamaha TZ350 for Cecotto to use for the remainder of the season. Cecotto relegated Agostini to second place in France, Italy and Finland while Agostini only managed to defeat Cecotto once in Spain. The nineteen-year-old Cecotto became the youngest-ever FIM World Champion at the time. His record stood until 1990 when Loris Capirossi won the 125cc World Championship at the age of 17.

Walter Villa won five Grand Prix races to claim his second consecutive 250cc World Championship for the Harley-Davidson-Aermacchi team. His Harley-Davidson teammate Michel Rougerie won two races and finished the championship in second place. Just as Phil Read had done in the 500 Class, Rougerie scored more points than his teammate Villa, but he also fell victim to FIM scoring rules which only recognized a competitor's best six results. Johnny Cecotto won two Grand Prix races and was leading in three other races but failed to finish in each of them. He placed fourth in the championship, just two points behind Dieter Braun. Kawasaki returned to Grand Prix racing with the new Kawasaki KR250.

In the 125cc division, the Morbidellis of Pileri and Bianchi dominated, finishing first and second in six of the ten events. Angel Nieto claimed his fourth world title for Kreidler in the 50cc class.

== 1975 Grand Prix season calendar ==
Round	Date	Race	Location	50cc winner	125cc winner	250cc winner	350cc winner	500cc winner	Report
1	March 30	(France) French Grand Prix	Paul Ricard		(Sweden) Kent Andersson	(Venezuela) Johnny Cecotto	(Venezuela) Johnny Cecotto	(Italy) Giacomo Agostini	Report
2	April 20	(Spain) Spanish Grand Prix	Jarama	(Spain) Angel Nieto	(Italy) Paolo Pileri	(Italy) Walter Villa	(Italy) Giacomo Agostini		Report
3	May 4	(Austria) Austrian Grand Prix	Salzburgring		(Italy) Paolo Pileri		(Japan) Hideo Kanaya	(Japan) Hideo Kanaya	Report
4	May 11	(West Germany) German Grand Prix	Hockenheimring	(Spain) Angel Nieto	(Italy) Paolo Pileri	(Italy) Walter Villa	(Venezuela) Johnny Cecotto	(Italy) Giacomo Agostini	Report
5	May 18	(Italy) Nations Grand Prix	Imola	(Spain) Angel Nieto	(Italy) Paolo Pileri	(Italy) Walter Villa	(Venezuela) Johnny Cecotto	(Italy) Giacomo Agostini	Report
6	June 6	(United Kingdom) Isle of Man TT	Snaefell Mountain			(United Kingdom) Chas Mortimer	(United Kingdom) Charlie Williams	(United Kingdom) Mick Grant	Report
7	June 28	(Netherlands) Dutch TT	Assen	(Spain) Angel Nieto	(Italy) Paolo Pileri	(Italy) Walter Villa	(West Germany) Dieter Braun	(United Kingdom) Barry Sheene	Report
8	July 6	(Belgium) Belgian Grand Prix	Spa	(Belgium) Julien van Zeebroeck	(Italy) Paolo Pileri	(Venezuela) Johnny Cecotto		(United Kingdom) Phil Read	Report
9	July 20	(Sweden) Swedish Grand Prix	Anderstorp	(Italy) Eugenio Lazzarini	(Italy) Paolo Pileri	(Italy) Walter Villa		(United Kingdom) Barry Sheene	Report
10	July 27	(Finland) Finnish Grand Prix	Imatra	(Spain) Angel Nieto		(France) Michel Rougerie	(Venezuela) Johnny Cecotto	(Italy) Giacomo Agostini	Report
11	August 24	(Czechoslovakia) Czechoslovak Grand Prix	Brno		(Sweden) Leif Gustafsson	(France) Michel Rougerie	(Italy) Otello Buscherini	(United Kingdom) Phil Read	Report
12	September 21	(Socialist Federal Republic of Yugoslavia) Yugoslavian Grand Prix	Opatija	(Spain) Angel Nieto	(West Germany) Dieter Braun	(West Germany) Dieter Braun	(Finland) Pentti Korhonen		Report

== Participants ==
=== 500cc participants ===
Team	Constructor	Motorcycle	No.	Rider	Rounds
MV Agusta	MV Agusta	MV Agusta 4C	0; 1; 2	(United Kingdom) Phil Read	1–4, 6–8, 10
MV Agusta	MV Agusta	MV Agusta 4C	2; 4	(Italy) Gianfranco Bonera	6, 8–9
MV Agusta	MV Agusta	MV Agusta 4C	41; 18; 20	(Italy) Armando Toracca	1–2
Suzuki	Suzuki	MV Agusta 4C	1; 3; 6; 5; 8	(Finland) Teuvo Länsivuori	1–3, 6, 9–10
Suzuki GB	Suzuki	Suzuki RG 500	7; 6; 9; 12	(United Kingdom) Barry Sheene	6–8
Suzuki GB	Suzuki	???	90; 14; 27	(United Kingdom) John Newbold	4, 6–7
Yamaha	Yamaha	???	2; 4; 8	(Italy) Giacomo Agostini	1–4, 6–10
Yamaha	Yamaha	???	3; 22; 11	(Japan) Hideo Kanaya	1–4
Arwidson	Yamaha	???	5; 22; 7	(Finland) Pentti Korhonen	8
???	Yamaha	???	5; 10; 52	(Australia) Jack Findlay	2–4, 6–9
???	Yamaha	???	6	(United Kingdom) Charlie Williams	5
???	Suzuki	???	9; 75	(United Kingdom) Stan Woods	3–4
???	Yamaha	???	10; 12; 7; 26; 9; 10	(Austria) Karl Auer	1–2, 6, 10
Gerald Brown	Yamaha	???	10; 28; 8	(United Kingdom) John Williams	5–8
Kawasaki/GB	Kawasaki	???	10; 29; 88; 11	(United Kingdom) Mick Grant	5
???	Suzuki	???	18	(Italy) Armando Toracca	4
???	Yamaha	???	19; 24; 11	(United Kingdom) Chas Mortimer	5, 9–10
Hermetite Ltd	Yamaha	???	20; 63; 12; 46; 14; 15	(United Kingdom) Alex George	1–4, 7, 10
???	Harley-Davidson	???	21	(France) Michel Rougerie	1
???	Yamaha	???	23	(United Kingdom) Peter McKinley	1
???	Yamaha	???	26	(France) Christian Léon	3
???	König	???	38; 10; 28; 36	(West Germany) Horst Lahfeld	2, 9
???	Yamaha	???	44; 12; 27	(United Kingdom) Steve Ellis	9
Gauloises	Yamaha	???	46; 38	(France) Olivier Chevallier	10
Gauloises	Yamaha	???	64; 51; 10	(France) Patrick Pons	1
???	Yamaha	???	48; 14; 6	(West Germany) Dieter Braun	2–3, 8
König	König	???	69	(France) Christian Léon	7
???	Yamaha	???	93	(France) Thierry Tchernine	2, 4, 7
???	Yamaha	???	???	(Republic of Ireland) Billie Guthrie	5
???	Yamaha	???	???	(United Kingdom) Steve Tonkin	5

Key
Regular Rider
Wildcard Rider
Replacement Rider

== Final standings ==
=== Scoring system ===
Points were awarded to the top ten finishers in each race. Only the best of four results were counted in the Sidecars championship, while in the 50cc class, only the best of five results were counted. In the 125cc, 250cc, 350cc and 500cc championships, the best of six results were counted.

(key)

Position	1st	2nd	3rd	4th	5th	6th	7th	8th	9th	10th
Points	15	12	10	8	6	5	4	3	2	1

=== 500cc final standings ===
Place	Rider	Team	Machine	FRA (France)	AUT (Austria)	GER (Germany)	NAC (Italy)	MAN (United Kingdom)	HOL (Netherlands)	BEL (Belgium)	SWE (Sweden)	FIN (Finland)	CZE (Czech Republic)	Pts
1	(Italy) Giacomo Agostini	Yamaha Motor NV	YZR500	1	Ret	1	1		2	Ret	Ret	1	2	84
2	(United Kingdom) Phil Read	MV Agusta	MV500	3	3	2	2		3	1	2	Ret	1	76 (96)
3	(Japan) Hideo Kanaya	Yamaha Motor NV	YZR500	2	1	4	3							45
4	(Finland) Teuvo Länsivuori	Suzuki	RG500	Ret	2	3			5			2	Ret	40
5	(United Kingdom) John Williams	Gerald Brown	YZR500	Ret	Ret			2	7	5	3	Ret	Ret	36
6	(United Kingdom) Barry Sheene	Suzuki GB	RG500			Ret	Ret		1	Ret	1	Ret	Ret	30
6	(United Kingdom) Alex George	Hermetite Racing International	YZR500	9	9	8	6	Ret	Ret	4	11	Ret	3	30
8	(United Kingdom) John Newbold	Suzuki GB	RG500		Ret	12	7		4	2	Ret			24
8	(Italy) Armando Toracca	MV Agusta	MV500	4	4	Ret	4							24
10	(Australia) Jack Findlay	Suzuki	RG500	Ret	Ret	10	Ret		Ret	3	9	3	Ret	23
10	(United Kingdom) Chas Mortimer	Sarome Racing	YZR500		Ret		DNS	3		Ret	Ret	4	6	23
12	(Austria) Karl Auer	Racing Team NO	YZR500	8	7	Ret			9		Ret		4	17
13	(West Germany) Dieter Braun	Mitsui Maschinen	YZR500	Ret	6	6				Ret	5			16
14	(United Kingdom) Mick Grant	Boyer-Kawasaki GB	H1R-RW					1						15
15	(Italy) Gianfranco Bonera	MV Agusta	MV500						6	Ret	4	Ret		13
16	(United Kingdom) Stan Woods		RG500		Ret	5	5							12
17	(Germany) Horst Lahfeld	König Motorenbau	König 500	Ret	5	Ret			Ret			6	Ret	11
18	(France) Christian Léon	König Motorenbau	König 500			7	Ret		Ret	6				9
19	(Republic of Ireland) Billie Guthrie		YZR500					4						8
20	(France) Patrick Pons	Sonauto Gauloises-Yamaha	YZR500	5	Ret	16				Ret	Ret			6
20	(United Kingdom) Steve Tonkin		YZR500					5						6
20	(United Kingdom) Steve Ellis		YZR500	14	Ret	Ret			16			5		6
20	(France) Olivier Chevallier	Sonauto Gauloises-Yamaha	YZR500							Ret	14		5	6
20	(Belgium) Tierry Tchernine		YZR500		10		8		Ret	9				6
25	(Finland) Pentti Korhonen	Arwidson Yamaha	YZR500	Ret			Ret			Ret	6		Ret	5
25	(United Kingdom) Pete McKinley		YZR500	6										5
25	(United Kingdom) Geoff Barry	EC Oakley	Yamsel			Ret		6						5
28	(United Kingdom) Charlie Williams		YZR500		11	Ret		7	18		Ret	Ret		4
28	(France) Michel Rougerie	Aermacchi-Harley Davidson	RR500	7		Ret	Ret							4
28	(South Africa) Alan North	Aermacchi-Harley Davidson	RR500					Ret	Ret	7				4
28	(France) Gerard Choukroun		YZR500								7			4
28	(Belgium) Thierry Van Der Veken		YZR500									7		4
28	(Netherlands) Marcel Ankoné	Ankoné Racing	RG500	11		11							7	4
34	(United Kingdom) Tom Herron		YZR500		8			21		Ret	14			3
34	(United Kingdom) Tony Rutter		YZR500					8	14					3
34	(Switzerland) Hans Stadelmann		YZR500		Ret				8					3
34	(Belgium) Francis Holleberg		YZR500							8				3
34	(Brazil) Edmar Ferreira	Carvalho Racing	YZR500								8	Ret		3
34	(Sweden) Johnny Bengtsson		YZR500									8		3
34	(Austria) Hans Braumandl		YZR500		15								8	3
41	(West Germany) Helmut Kassner		YZR500	13	13	13		9	11	Ret			Ret	2
41	(Brazil) Adu Celso	Carvalho Racing	YZR500	12	Ret	9								2
41	(France) Bernard Fau		YZR500			Ret	9			Ret				2
41	(Norway) Bjorn Hasli		YZR500								17	9		2
41	(Denmark) Børge Nielsen		YZR500								Ret		9	2
46	(Norway) Kjell Solberg		YZR500	10										1
46	(Switzerland) Rudolph Keller		YZR500	DNS			10							1
46	(Australia) Les Kenny		YZR500	17		Ret		10						1
46	(Netherlands) Peter Van Der Wal		YZR500						10					1
46	(France) Jean-François Baldé		YZR500							10				1
46	(Finland) Pekka Nurmi	Silja Line Racing	YZR500			20					10			1
46	(Finland) Seppo Kangasniemi		YZR500									10		1
46	(Finland) Anssi Resko		YZR500										10	1
54	(Germany) Edmund Czihak	Zweirad	YZ634A		18	19								0
Place	Rider	Team	Machine	FRA (France)	AUT (Austria)	GER (Germany)	NAC (Italy)	MAN (United Kingdom)	HOL (Netherlands)	BEL (Belgium)	SWE (Sweden)	FIN (Finland)	CZE (Czech Republic)	Pts

=== 350cc standings ===
Pos	Rider	Machine	FRA (France)	SPA (Spain)	AUT (Austria)	GER (Germany)	NAC (Italy)	MAN (United Kingdom)	HOL (Netherlands)	FIN (Finland)	CZE (Czech Republic)	YUG (Socialist Federal Republic of Yugoslavia)	Pts
1	(Venezuela) Johnny Cecotto	Yamaha TZ350	1	2	Ret	1	1		5	1	Ret		78
2	(Italy) Giacomo Agostini	Yamaha TZ350	2	1	Ret	Ret	2		4	2	Ret		59
3	(Finland) Pentti Korhonen	Yamaha TZ350	7	6	9	3	Ret		2	Ret	10	1	48
4	(West Germany) Dieter Braun	Yamaha TZ350		5	Ret	2	4		1	5	Ret	Ret	47
5	(France) Patrick Pons	Yamaha TZ350	Ret	Ret	5		3		Ret	3	5		32
6	(United Kingdom) Chas Mortimer	Yamaha TZ350	Ret	Ret		7	8	2	9	Ret		3	31
7	(France) Gerard Choukroun	Yamaha TZ350	3	7	7	Ret	5	Ret	Ret	Ret	7	Ret	28
8	(Italy) Otello Buscherini	Yamaha TZ350									1	2	27
9	(United Kingdom) Tom Herron	Yamaha TZ350		11	Ret	Ret		3		Ret	4	4	26
10	(Japan) Hideo Kanaya	Yamaha TZ350	Ret	3	1	Ret	Ret						25
11	(Spain) Víctor Palomo	Yamaha TZ350		4	Ret	Ret	Ret		Ret	7	3	Ret	22
12	(United Kingdom) Alex George	Yamaha TZ350		Ret		8	Ret	Ret	3	9	6	Ret	20
13	(Switzerland) Philippe Coulon	Yamaha TZ350	17		4	4	Ret			Ret	Ret	Ret	16
14	(United Kingdom) Charlie Williams	Yamaha TZ350		Ret				1		Ret			15
15	(Switzerland) Hans Stadelmann	Yamaha TZ350	14		8	5	10		7				14
16	(South Africa) Jon Ekerold	Yamaha TZ350			2				10				13
17	(France) Olivier Chevallier	Yamaha TZ350			Ret		Ret			Ret	2	Ret	12
18	(Brazil) Adu Celso	Yamaha TZ350		9	3								12
19	(Austria) Karl Auer	Yamaha TZ350	Ret			6			Ret	6	9	Ret	12
20	(France) Jean-Louis Guignabodet	Yamaha TZ350	4			17			Ret				8
21	(Switzerland) Bruno Kneubühler	Yamaha TZ350			Ret					4		Ret	8
22	(United Kingdom) Steve Tonkin	Yamaha TZ350						4					8
23	(France) Christian Huguet	Yamaha TZ350	5										6
24	(Germany) Rudolf Kunz	Yamaha TZ350											6
25	(United Kingdom) Derek Chatterton	Yamaha TZ350						5					6
26	(Republic of Ireland) Billie Guthrie	Yamaha TZ350						6					5
27	(Germany) Anton Mang	Yamaha TZ350			6								5
28	(France) Jean-François Baldé	Yamaha TZ350	6			Ret			17	13			5
29	(Netherlands) Wil Hartog	Yamaha TZ350							6				5
30	(United Kingdom) Bill Henderson	Yamaha TZ350						14				6	5
31	(Italy) Giovanni Proni	Yamaha TZ350					6						5
32	(Italy) Marco Lucchinelli	Yamaha TZ350					7						4
33	(Italy) Mario Lega	Yamaha TZ350										7	4
34	(Republic of Ireland) Gerry Mateer	Yamaha TZ350						7					4
35	(Austria) Max Wiener	Yamaha TZ350			10							8	4
36	(United Kingdom) Tony Rutter	Yamaha TZ350							8				3
37	(Italy) Walter Villa	Harley-Davidson RR350		8									3
38	(Netherlands) Boet van Dulmen	Yamaha TZ350								8			3
39	(Finland) Tapio Virtanen	Yamaha TZ350									8		3
40	(United Kingdom) Geoff Barry	Yamaha TZ350						8					3
41	(United Kingdom) Pete McKinley	Yamaha TZ350	9			10							3
42	(Australia) Les Kenny	Yamaha TZ350				9							2
43	(United Kingdom) Noel Clegg	Yamaha TZ350						9					2
44	(Italy) Guido Mandracci	Yamaha TZ350					9						2
45	(Hungary) Janos Reisz	Yamaha TZ350										9	2
46	(Czechoslovakia) Titer Balaz	Yamaha TZ350										10	1
47	(Australia) John Dodds	Yamaha TZ350								10			1
48	(United Kingdom) Martin Sharpe	Yamaha TZ350						10					1
49	(United Kingdom) John Williams	Dugdale Yamaha TZ350		10									1
50	(Norway) Kjell Solberg	Yamaha TZ350	10										1

=== 250cc standings ===
Place	Rider	Number	Country	Machine	Points	Wins
1	(Italy) Walter Villa	1	Italy	Harley-Davidson RR250	85	5
2	(France) Michel Rougerie	9	France	Harley-Davidson RR250	76	2
3	(West Germany) Dieter Braun	2	West Germany	Yamaha TZ250	56	1
4	(Venezuela) Johnny Cecotto	19	Venezuela	Yamaha TZ250	54	2
5	(France) Patrick Pons	3	France	Yamaha TZ250	48	0
6	(United Kingdom) Chas Mortimer		United Kingdom	Yamaha TZ250	46	0
7	(Italy) Otello Buscherini		Italy	Yamaha TZ250	40	0
8	(Sweden) Leif Gustafsson		Sweden	Yamaha TZ250	33	0
9	(Switzerland) Bruno Kneubühler	5	Switzerland	Yamaha TZ250	22	0
10	(Finland) Tapio Virtanen		Finland	Yamaha TZ250	20	0
11	Víctor Palomo				18	
12	Harald Bartol				18	
13	Tom Herron				16	
14	John Williams				15	
15	Derek Chatterton				12	
16	Ikujiro Takai				12	
17	Benjamin Grau				10	
18	Alex George				9	
19	John Dodds				9	
20	Pentti Korhonen				9	
21	Tony Rutter				8	
22	Rolf Minhoff				8	
23	Edmar Ferreira				8	
24	Paolo Pileri				6	
25	Yvon Duhamel				6	
26	Mario Lega				5	
27	Gerard Choukroun				5	
28	Bill Henderson				5	
29	Neil Tuxworth				4	
30	Olivier Chevallier				3	
31	Duilio Agostini				3	
32	Helmut Kassner				3	
33	Nico Van Der Zanden				3	
34	Pete McKinley				3	
35	Jean Louis Guignabodet				2	
36	Eddie Roberts				2	
37	Horst Lahfeld				2	
38	Vincenzo Cascino				1	
39	Philippe Bouzanne				1	
40	Clive Horton				1	
41	Jean-François Baldé				1	

=== 125cc standings ===
Place	Rider	Number	Country	Machine	Points	Wins
1	(Italy) Paolo Pileri		Italy	Morbidelli	90	7
2	(Italy) Pier Paolo Bianchi		Italy	Morbidelli	72	0
3	(Sweden) Kent Andersson	1	Sweden	Yamaha	67	1
4	(Sweden) Leif Gustafsson	8	Sweden	Yamaha	57	1
5	(Italy) Eugenio Lazzarini		Italy	Piovaticci	47	0
6	(Switzerland) Bruno Kneubühler	2	Switzerland	Yamaha	43	0
7	(Netherlands) Henk van Kessel		Netherlands	Condor	38	0
8	(Austria) Harald Bartol	7	Austria	Suzuki	21	0
9	(Austria) Johan Zemzauer		Austria	Rotax	21	0
10	(Italy) Pierluigi Conforti		Italy	Morbidelli	18	0
11	Dieter Braun				15	
12	Hans Müller				14	
13	Cees van Dongen				9	
14	Peter Frohnmeyer				8	
15	Jos Schurgers				6	
16	Horst Seel				6	
17	Maurice Maingret				5	
18	Otello Buscherini				5	
19	Matti Kinnunen				5	
20	Oriol Fernandez				4	
21	Gert Bender				4	
22	Hans Hallberg				4	
23	Matti Salonen				4	
24	V.Novella				2	
25	R.Cornelis				2	
26	Alberto Ieva				2	
27	J.Lazo				2	
28	J.Svensson				2	
29	Tierry Tchernine				2	
30	R.Thiele				2	
31	Xaver Tschannen				1	
32	P.Van Niel				1	
33	Ulrich Graf				1	
34	Ivan Carlsson				1	
35	Zbynek Havrda				1	
36	Hans Hummel				1	
37	M.Arias				1	

=== 50cc standings ===
Place	Rider	Number	Country	Machine	Points	Wins
1	(Spain) Angel Nieto		Spain	Kreidler	75	6
2	(Italy) Eugenio Lazzarini		Italy	Piovaticci	61	1
3	(Belgium) Julien van Zeebroeck		Belgium	Kreidler	43	1
4	(West Germany) Rudolf Kunz	5	West Germany	Kreidler	37	0
5	(West Germany) Herbert Rittberger	2	West Germany	Kreidler	31	0
6	(Switzerland) Stefan Dörflinger	9	Switzerland	Kreidler	31	0
7	(Netherlands) Nico Polane		Netherlands	Kreidler	28	0
8	(West Germany) Gerhard Thurow	4	West Germany	Kreidler	21	0
9	(Austria) Hans Hummel		Austria	Kreidler	20	0
10	(Italy) Claudio Lusuardi		Italy	Derbi	16	0
11	Theo Timmer				13	
12	Henk Van Kessel				12	
13	Aldo Pero				10	
14	Ulrich Graf				10	
15	Gerrit Strikker				8	
16	Cees Van Dongen				8	
17	Jan Huberts				5	
18	Rolf Blatter				4	
19	Ramon Gali				4	
20	W.Werner				4	
21	J.Alguersari				4	
22	Theo Van Geffen				3	
23	K.Gotesson				3	
24	Jan Bruins				3	
25	Robert Laver				3	
26	C.Guerrini				2	
27	Ingo Emmerich				2	
28	Joaquim Gali				1	
29	Pierre Audry				1	
30	Germano Zanetti				1	
31	Günter Schirnhofer				1	
