= 1975 Isle of Man TT =

Annual motorcycle racing event

Race details
- Race 6 of 12 races in the 1975 Grand Prix motorcycle racing season
- Date: 6 June 1975
- Official name: Manx Grand Prix
- Location: Snaefell Mountain Course
- Course: Public roads; 60.725 km (37.733 mi)

500cc
Pole position
- Rider: (United Kingdom) Tony Rutter
- Time: 21:35.800
Fastest lap
- Rider: (United Kingdom) Mick Grant
- Time: 2:15'27.600
Podium
- First: (United Kingdom) Mick Grant
- Second: (United Kingdom) John Williams
- Third: (United Kingdom) Chas Mortimer

350cc
Pole position
- Rider: Unknown
Fastest lap
- Rider: Unknown
Podium
- First: (United Kingdom) Charlie Williams
- Second: (United Kingdom) Chas Mortimer
- Third: (United Kingdom) Tom Herron

250cc
Pole position
- Rider: Unknown
Fastest lap
- Rider: Unknown
Podium
- First: (United Kingdom) Chas Mortimer
- Second: (United Kingdom) Derek Chatterton
- Third: (United Kingdom) John Williams

125cc
Pole position
- Rider: None
Fastest lap
- Rider: None
Podium
- First: None
- Second: None
- Third: None

50cc
Pole position
- Rider: None
Fastest lap
- Rider: None
Podium
- First: None
- Second: None
- Third: None

The 1975 Isle of Man TT was the sixth round of the 1975 Grand Prix motorcycle racing season. It took place on the weekend of 4–6 June 1975 at the Snaefell Mountain Course.

== 500cc classification ==
Pos.	Rider	Team	Manufacturer	Time/Retired	Points
1	(United Kingdom) Mick Grant	Boyer Team Kawasaki	Kawasaki	2:15'27.600	15
2	(United Kingdom) John Williams		Yamaha	+31.200	12
3	(United Kingdom) Chas Mortimer	Sarome Racing	Yamaha	+2'55.200	10
4	(United Kingdom) Billie Guthrie		Yamaha	+2'58.600	8
5	(United Kingdom) Steve Tonkin		McVeigh-Yamaha	+4'05.600	6
6	(United Kingdom) Geoff Barry	EC Oakley	Yamsel	+4'07.200	5
7	(United Kingdom) Charlie Williams		Yamaha	+4'10.400	4
8	(United Kingdom) Tony Rutter		Yamaha	+4'19.000	3
9	(West Germany) Helmut Kassner		Yamaha	+4'57.400	2
10	(Australia) Les Kenny		Renstar-Yamaha	+4'58.200	1
11	(United Kingdom) Martyn Sharpe	Barton Motors	Yamaha	+6'16.200	
12	(United Kingdom) Bill Simpson		Yamaha	+8'18.400	
13	(United Kingdom) David Hughes		Matchless	+8'36.000	
14	(United Kingdom) John Weeden		Yamaha	+8'42.400	
15	(United Kingdom) Selwyn Griffiths		Matchless	+9'14.200	
16	(United Kingdom) Roger Sutcliffe		Suzuki	+9'28.400	
17	(United Kingdom) Neil Tuxworth		Yamaha	+9'44.800	
18	(United Kingdom) Paul Cott		Yamaha	+9'57.400	
19	(United Kingdom) Derek Chatterton	Chatterton Motors	Yamaha	+10'26.000	
20	(United Kingdom) Barry Ditchburn	Boyer Team Kawasaki	Kawasaki	+10'50.800	
21	(United Kingdom) Tom Herron		Matchless	+11'11.600	
22	(United Kingdom) Bernard Murray	Albion Street Motors	Yamaha	+11'50.000	
23	(United Kingdom) Tom Newell		Norton	+12'26.000	
24	(United Kingdom) Henry McEwan	Bill Robertson Motors	Yamaha	+13'29.800	
25	(United Kingdom) James Scott		Yamaha	+13'40.600	
26	(United Kingdom) Malcolm Lucas	Fred Hanks Motorcycles	Norton	+15'00.000	
27	(West Germany) Hans-Otto Butenuth		Yamaha	+17'15.200	
28	(United Kingdom) Frank Rutter		Yamaha	+17'32.400	
29	(Sweden) Bo Granath		Husqvarna	+18'34.000	
30	(United Kingdom) Donal Cormican		Yamaha	+19'29.200	
31	(United Kingdom) Fred Walton		Velocette	+21'26.600	
32	(United Kingdom) Walter Dawson		Seeley	+21'52.400	
33	(United Kingdom) Ernie Coates		Yamaha	+27'38.800	
34	(United Kingdom) James Ashton		Yamaha	+28'19.800	
35	(United Kingdom) Malcolm Moffat		Yamaha	+29'29.800	
36	(United Kingdom) Derek Loan	Barton Motors	Suzuki	+28'06.600	
37	(United Kingdom) Tom Robinson		Yamaha	+30'40.800	
38	(United Kingdom) Chris Neve		Yamaha	+32'37.400	
39	(United Kingdom) Gerry Mateer		Yamaha	+33'52.400	
Ret	(United Kingdom) John Taylor		Yamaha	Retired	
Ret	(United Kingdom) Alex George		Yamaha	Retired	
Ret	(United Kingdom) Roger Nichols		Yamaha	Retired	
Ret	(United Kingdom) Abe Alexander		Yamsel	Retired	
Ret	(United Kingdom) Bill Rae		Yamaha	Retired	
Ret	(United Kingdom) Abe Walsh		Ducati	Retired	
Ret	(South Africa) Alan North		Yamaha	Retired	
Ret	(United Kingdom) Bill Henderson		Yamaha	Retired	
Ret	(United Kingdom) Brian Warburton		Suzuki	Retired	
Ret	(United Kingdom) Graham Waring		Yamaha	Retired	
Ret	(Netherlands) Jan Kostwinder		Yamaha	Retired	
Ret	(West Germany) Horst Gluck		BMW	Retired	
Ret	(United Kingdom) Hartley Kerner		Honda	Retired	
Ret	(United Kingdom) Donald Grant		Norton	Retired	
Ret	(United Kingdom) Bernie Toleman		Suzuki	Retired	
Ret	(United Kingdom) Bill Robertson		Suzuki	Retired	
Ret	(United Kingdom) Mick Poxon		Suzuki	Retired	
Ret	(United Kingdom) Barry Randle		Yamaha	Retired	
Ret	(United Kingdom) Bill Smith		Yamaha	Retired	
Ret	(United Kingdom) Bob Heath		Yamaha	Retired	
Ret	(United Kingdom) Brian Moses		Yamaha	Retired	
Ret	(United Kingdom) Dennis Trollope		Yamaha	Retired	
Ret	(United Kingdom) Derek Tierney		Yamaha	Retired	
Ret	(United Kingdom) Ian Richards		Yamaha	Retired	
Ret	(United Kingdom) Ken Huggett		Yamaha	Retired	
Ret	(United Kingdom) Martin Read		Yamaha	Retired	
Ret	(United Kingdom) Mick Burns		Yamaha	Retired	
Ret	(United Kingdom) Mick Chatterton		Yamaha	Retired	
Ret	(Republic of Ireland) Norman Dunn		Yamaha	Retired	
Ret	(United Kingdom) Percy Tait		Yamaha	Retired	
Ret	(United Kingdom) Peter Grove		Yamaha	Retired	
Ret	(United Kingdom) Phil Carpenter		Yamaha	Retired	
Ret	(United Kingdom) Phil Gurner		Yamaha	Retired	
Ret	(United Kingdom) Alan Rogers		Yamsel	Retired	
Ret	(United Kingdom) Denis Gallagher		Yamsel	Retired	

Previous race: 1975 Nations Grand Prix	FIM Grand Prix World Championship; 1975 season	Next race: 1975 Dutch TT
Previous race: 1974 Isle of Man TT	Isle of Man TT	Next race: 1976 Isle of Man TT
