= Les Kenny =

Grand Prix motorcycle racer

- Nationality: Australian
- Born: Leslie Frederick Kenny; 1946
- Died: 12 June 1976 (aged 29–30)
Motorcycle racing career statistics
Grand Prix motorcycle racing
Active years	1975 - 1976
First race	1975 350cc German Grand Prix
Last race	1976 Isle of Man TT
Championships	0
Starts / Wins / Podiums / Poles / F. laps / Points; 2 / 0 / 0 / 0 / 0 / 3

Leslie Frederick Kenny (1946 – 12 June 1976) was an Australian professional Grand Prix motorcycle road racer.

Kenny rose to prominence in Australian road racing between 1972 and 1976. He had his most successful season in 1975 when he finished the season in 52nd place in the 500cc world championship. He was killed in an accident during the 1976 Isle of Man TT.
