= Leif Gustafsson =

Swedish motorcycle racer

- Nationality: Swedish
Motorcycle racing career statistics
Grand Prix motorcycle racing
Active years	1973–1976, 1978
First race	1973 250cc Swedish Grand Prix
Last race	1978 350cc British Grand Prix
First win	1975 125cc Czechoslovak Grand Prix
Last win	1975 125cc Czechoslovak Grand Prix
Team	Maico
Championships	0
Starts / Wins / Podiums / Poles / F. laps / Points; 31 / 1 / 2 / 0 / 0 / 226

Leif Gustafsson (born 7 October 1951) is a Swedish former Grand Prix motorcycle road racer. His best year was in 1975, when he won the Czechoslovak Grand Prix, and finished fourth in the 125cc world championship.
