= Kent Andersson (motorcyclist) =

Swedish motorcycle racer (1942–2006)

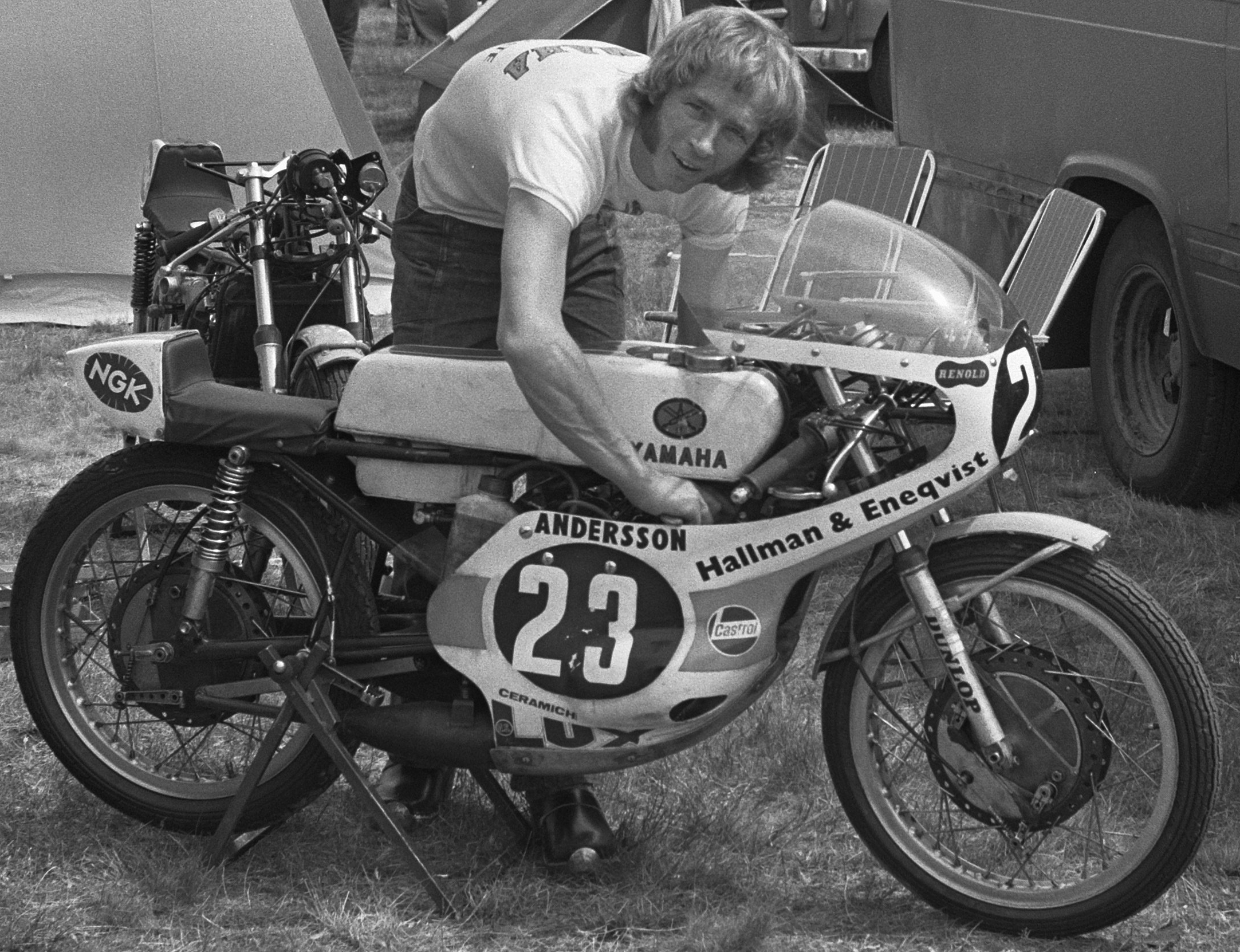
- Andersson in 1973 with a 125 Yamaha
- Nationality: Swedish
- Born: August 1, 1942; Landvetter, Sweden
- Died: August 29, 2006 (aged 64); Landvetter, Sweden
Motorcycle racing career statistics
Grand Prix motorcycle racing
Active years	1966–1975
First race	1966 250cc Finnish Grand Prix
Last race	1975 125cc Yugoslavian Grand Prix
First win	1969 250cc West German Grand Prix
Last win	1975 125cc French Grand Prix
Team	Yamaha
Championships	125cc - 1973, 1974
Starts / Wins / Podiums / Poles / F. laps / Points; 90 / 17 / 53 / 4 / 9

Kent Andersson (August 1, 1942 – August 29, 2006) was a Swedish professional motorcycle road racer. He competed in Grand Prix motorcycle racing between 1966 and 1975, most prominently as a member of the Yamaha factory racing team where he was a two-time 125cc World Champion. Andersson was notable for being the only Swedish rider to win an FIM road racing world championship.

== Motorcycle racing career ==
Born in Landvetter, Sweden, Andersson rode in his first national championship races at the age of 19 in Sweden and Denmark on a Monark in the 250 cc class. He then rode a 250 cc Bultaco for the 1962 season. He proved himself to be a capable competitor.

After winning the 250cc Swedish national championship in 1965, Andersson moved up to the world championships competing with Husqvarna bikes that he modified himself. He bought a Yamaha 250 cc production racer and began posting solid results. In 1969 he finished second in the 250 championship after a season-long battle with Santiago Herrero and eventual champion Kel Carruthers. These impressive results earned him a place on the Yamaha factory 250 cc racing team as Rod Gould's teammate for the 1970 season, in which he finished third.

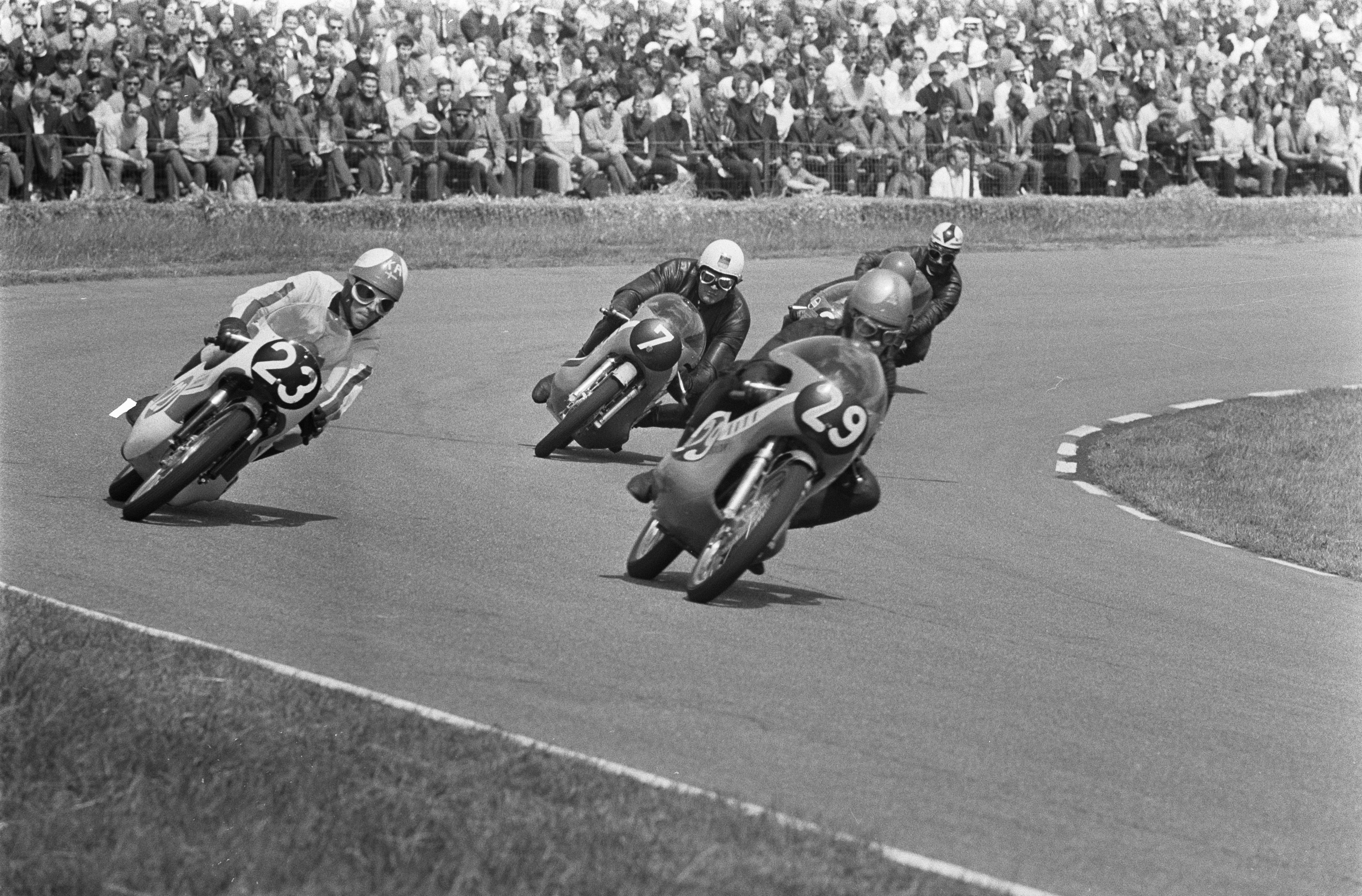
Andersson (23) and Dieter Braun (7) pursue Cees van Dongen (29) in the 1969 125cc Dutch TT. Eventual winner, Dave Simmonds, follows behind an obscured rider.

Yamaha chose Andersson to help develop their TA125 racebike for the 1971 season. He went on to finish second in the 1972 on the water-cooled development model designated YZ623C, and claim the 1973 125cc World Championship. In 1974, he successfully defended his title by winning five races along with two second-place finishes.

Andersson retired after finishing 3rd in the 1975 season and took a position at Yamaha Europe's Developing and Constructing Department. Among other projects, Andersson had an important role in developing the three-cylinder 350 cc bike that Takazumi Katayama rode to win the 350cc road racing world championship in 1977. Andersson continued racing in his later years just for fun at an amateur level in Sweden, but did so well that he won the Supermono National Championship in 1995 at the age of 53. He was a successful member of Ferry Brouwer's Dutch Yamaha Classic Racing Team. He often participated in historic motorsport exhibition races all over Europe. Andersson sometimes served as expert Road Racing commentator for Swedish Eurosport. Andersson died in August 2006 in Landvetter at the age of 64.

== Grand Prix motorcycle racing results ==
Points system from 1950 to 1968:

**Position**	1	2	3	4	5	6
**Points**	8	6	4	3	2	1

Points system from 1969 onwards:

**Position**	1	2	3	4	5	6	7	8	9	10
**Points**	15	12	10	8	6	5	4	3	2	1

(key) (Races in bold indicate pole position; races in italics indicate fastest lap)

Year	Class	Team	1	2	3	4	5	6	7	8	9	10	11	12	13	Points	Rank	Wins
1966	250cc	Husqvarna	ESP; 5	GER -	FRA -	NED -	BEL -	DDR -	CZE -	FIN; 6	ULS -	IOM -	NAT -	JPN; 6		4	20th	0
1966	350cc	Husqvarna		GER -	FRA -	NED -		DDR -	CZE -	FIN -	ULS -	IOM -	NAT -	JPN; 6		1	25th	0
1968	125cc	MZ	GER; 5	ESP -	IOM -	NED -		DDR -	CZE -	FIN -	ULS -	NAT -				2	17th	0
1968	250cc	Yamaha	GER; 3	ESP -	IOM -	NED -	BEL; 6	DDR -	CZE -	FIN -	ULS; 6	NAT -				6	8th	0
1969	125cc	Maico	ESP; 2	GER -	FRA -	IOM -	NED; 2	BEL; 4	DDR; 7	CZE -	FIN -		NAT -	YUG -		36	4th	0
1969	250cc	Yamaha	ESP; 2	GER; 1	FRA; 3	IOM -	NED; 7	BEL; 4	DDR; 4	CZE; 7	FIN; 1	ULS; 2	NAT; 3	YUG; 3		84	**2nd**	2
1970	250cc	Yamaha	GER -	FRA -	YUG; 2	IOM -	NED -	BEL; 5	DDR; 3	CZE; 2	FIN; 2	ULS -	NAT -	ESP; 1		67	**3rd**	1
1970	350cc	Yamaha	GER -		YUG -	IOM -	NED; 5		DDR; 5	CZE; 3	FIN; 2	ULS -	NAT -	ESP; 3		44	4th	0
1971	125cc	Yamaha	AUT -	GER; 3	IOM -	NED -	BEL -	DDR -	CZE -	SWE; 3	FIN -		NAT; 7	ESP; 5		30	9th	0
1971	250cc	Yamaha	AUT; 4	GER; 5	IOM -	NED -	BEL -	DDR -	CZE -	SWE -	FIN -	ULS -	NAT -	ESP -		14	14th	0
1972	50cc	Kreidler	GER -			NAT -		YUG -	NED -	BEL -	DDR -		SWE -		ESP; 3	10	12th	0
1972	125cc	Yamaha	GER; 5	FRA -	AUT; 3	NAT -	IOM -	YUG; 1	NED -	BEL; 3	DDR; 3	CZE; 3	SWE; 2	FIN; 1	ESP; 1	87	**2nd**	3
1972	250cc	Yamaha	GER -	FRA -	AUT -	NAT -	IOM -	YUG; 3	NED -	BEL; 7	DDR; 5	CZE; 10	SWE; 4	FIN; 3	ESP -	39	7th	0
1973	125cc	Yamaha	FRA; 1	AUT; 1	GER; 1	NAT; 1	IOM -	YUG; 1	NED -	BEL -	CZE -	SWE; 2	FIN; 2	ESP -		99	**1st**	5
1973	350cc	Yamaha	FRA; 5	AUT; 7	GER -	NAT; 3	IOM -	YUG; 4	NED; 6		CZE -	SWE -	FIN; 6	ESP -		38	6th	0
1974	125cc	Yamaha	FRA; 1	GER -	AUT; 1	NAT; 2		NED; 3	BEL; 2	**SWE**; 1		CZE; 1	**YUG**; 1	**ESP**; 4		87	**1st**	5
1974	250cc	Yamaha		GER -		NAT; 5	IOM -	NED -	BEL -	SWE -	FIN; 4	CZE; 6	YUG -	ESP -		34	8th	0
1975	125cc	Yamaha	FRA; 1	ESP; 2	AUT; 4	GER; 3	NAT -	NED -	BEL; 3	**SWE**; 4	CZE; 2	YUG; 4				67	**3rd**	1
