= Paolo Pileri =

Italian motorcycle racer (1944–2007)

- Nationality: Italian
- Born: 31 July 1944; Terni, Kingdom of Italy
- Died: 12 February 2007 (aged 62); Terni, Italy
Motorcycle racing career statistics
Grand Prix motorcycle racing
Active years	1973 - 1979
First race	1973 125cc Austrian Grand Prix
Last race	1979 350cc French Grand Prix
First win	1975 125cc Spanish Grand Prix
Last win	1978 250cc Belgian Grand Prix
Team	Morbidelli
Championships	125cc - 1975
Starts / Wins / Podiums / Poles / F. laps / Points; 33 / 8 / 20 / 5 / 5 / 280

Paolo Pileri (31 July 1944 – 12 February 2007) was an Italian professional motorcycle racer and racing team manager. He competed in the Grand Prix road racing world championships from 1973 to 1979. Pileri is notable for winning the FIM 125cc world championship in 1975.

Pileri was born in Terni, Italy where he grew up idolizing Italian motorcycling world champion Libero Liberati. He initially competed in motocross racing before switching to road racing in 1971. Pileri's impressive third place in the 1973 250cc Belgian Grand Prix earned him an invitation to join the Morbidelli factory racing team.

Pileri won his first Grand Prix race for Morbidelli at the 1975 125cc Spanish Grand Prix then went on to win the next six races to clinch the 125cc world championship. Later on his career, he took one 250cc victory in the 1978 250cc Belgian Grand Prix. He retired after the 1979 season at the age of 35. In a seven-year Grand Prix racing career, Pileri won 8 races and took 20 podium finishes from 33 starts.

Pileri became a motorcycle racing team manager after retiring from competition where he successfully guided Loris Capirossi to successive 125cc world championships in 1990 and 1991. He is credited with giving Valentino Rossi his first opportunity to compete when he joined Pileri's team at the age of 14. Pileri died in Terni on February 12, 2007 at the age of 63.
