= Alex George (motorcyclist) =

British motorcycle racer (born 1949)

- Nationality: British
Motorcycle racing career statistics
Grand Prix motorcycle racing
Active years	1970, 1973 - 1979
First race	1970 Isle of Man 250 cc Lightweight TT
Last race	1979 500 cc Belgian Grand Prix
Team	Honda
Championships	0
Starts / Wins / Podiums / Poles / F. laps / Points; 36 / 0 / 3 / 0 / 0 / 153
Isle of Man TT career
TTs contested	1970–1992
TT wins	3 – 1975, 1979 (2)
First TT win	1975
Last TT win	1979
TT podiums	3

Alex George (born March 1949) is a Scottish former professional motorcycle road racer. He competed in the Grand Prix world championships in 1970 and then from 1973 to 1979. George was a street circuit specialist and was a three-time winner at the Isle of Man TT. His best year in world championship competition came in 1975 when he finished in seventh place in the 500 cc Grand Prix world championship.

Born in Glasgow, George finished tenth in the 500 class in 1973. During the 1975 500cc world championship, he scored podium results with a third place behind Phil Read and Giacomo Agostini at the 500cc Czechoslovak Grand Prix and a third place behind Dieter Braun and Pentti Korhonen at the 350 cc Dutch TT. His third place in the 1977 500 cc Austrian Grand Prix came about as a result of some riders boycotting the race, following an accident in the earlier 350 cc race. Riders in the 500 cc category then organised a boycott of their race which led to only 14 competitors taking part. He teamed up with Jean-Claude Chemarin on the Honda France team to win the 1976 Bol d'Or 24-hour endurance race. He also competed in the Formula 750 Class on a Yamaha TZ750.

George's most memorable victory at the Isle of Man TT came in 1979, when he beat pre-race favourite Mike Hailwood who had successfully returned to motorcycle racing at the 1978 Isle of Man TT after a short time in Formula 1 Grand Prix car racing. Serious injuries sustained in a crash at Ginger Hall, Sulby during practise for the 1980 Isle of Man TT followed by a second TT crash on his return 2 years later, ended his competitive career.

George was President of the TT Riders Association during 2017.
