= Pentti Korhonen =

Finnish motorcycle racer

- Nationality: Finnish
Motorcycle racing career statistics
Grand Prix motorcycle racing
Active years	1969 - 1970, 1972 - 1979
First race	1969 250cc Finnish Grand Prix
Last race	1979 350cc Finnish Grand Prix
First win	1975 350cc Yugoslavian Grand Prix
Last win	1975 350cc Yugoslavian Grand Prix
Team	Yamaha
Starts / Wins / Podiums / Poles / F. laps / Points; 62 / 1 / 10 / 1 / 0 / 346

Pentti Korhonen (born 14 June 1951) is a Finnish former professional motorcycle road racer. He competed in Grand Prix motorcycle racing between 1969 and 1979.

Korhonen was born in Rantasalmi, Finland. He had his most successful year in 1975 when he won the 350cc Yugoslavian Grand Prix and finished in third place in the 350cc World Championship, behind Johnny Cecotto and Giacomo Agostini.
