= Dieter König =

German racer and engine builder

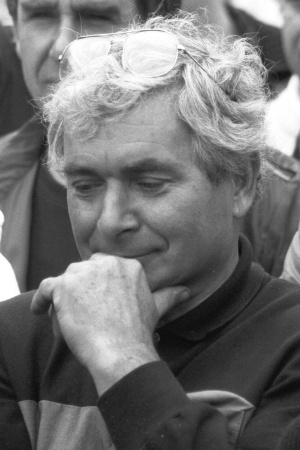
- Koenig in 1985

Personal information
- Born: May 19, 1931; Berlin, Germany
- Died: August 17, 1991 (aged 60)
- Occupation: Engine manufacturer

Sport
- Sport: Racing

Dieter König (19 May 1931 – 17 August 1991) raced hydroplanes and was also responsible for manufacturing the engines that powered them. During the 1960s, 1970s and 1980s his "König" engines dominated the sport.

The engines were manufactured in his hometown of Berlin, Germany. They were used in Grand Prix motorcycle racing powering Kim Newcombe to second place in the 500cc class of the 1973 Grand Prix motorcycle racing season, as well as powering Rolf Steinhausen/Josef Huber to win two World Sidecar Championships.
