= List of 500cc/MotoGP polesitters =

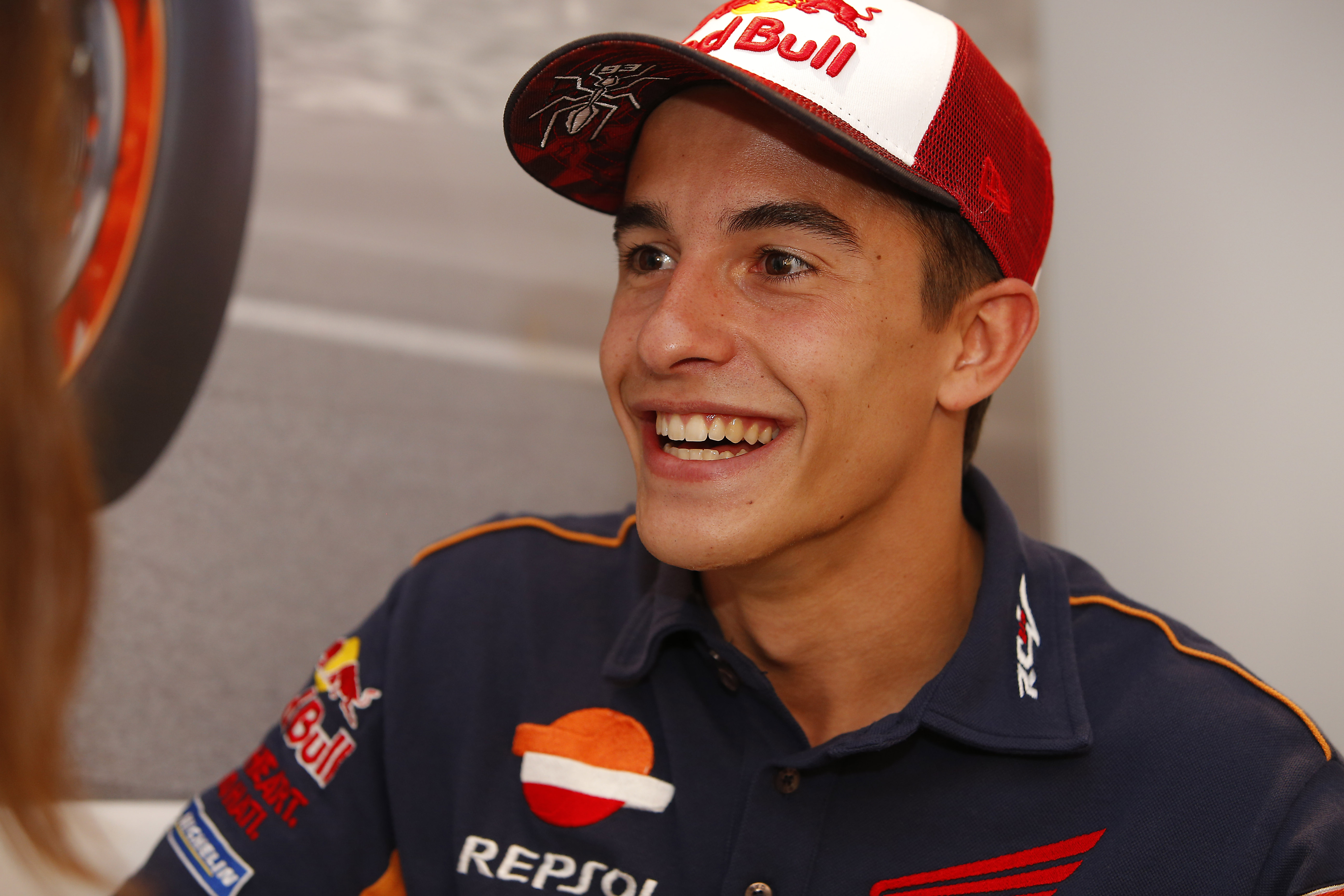
Marc Márquez, who holds the record with 78 MotoGP pole positions during his career

Grand Prix motorcycle racing is the premier championship of motorcycle road racing, which has been divided into three classes: MotoGP, Moto2, and Moto3. Former classes that have been discontinued include 350cc, 250cc, 125cc, 50cc/80cc, MotoE, and Sidecar. The premier class is MotoGP, which was formerly known as the 500cc class. The Grand Prix Road-Racing World Championship was established in 1949 by the sport's governing body, the Fédération Internationale de Motocyclisme (FIM), and is the oldest motorsport world championship in existence.

This list only lists pole positions since 1974, when pole positions were first officially recorded. Marc Márquez holds the record for the most pole positions in the premier class with 78. Mick Doohan is second with 58 poles, and Valentino Rossi is third with 55 poles.

== By rider ==
As of the 2026 MotoGP Portuguese Grand Prix

Key
*	MotoGP/500cc World Champion
†	Grand Prix World Champion
**Bold**	Rider has competed in the 2026 MotoGP season

Grand Prix motorcycle racing polesitters
Rank	Country	Rider	Poles	Seasons active in MotoGP/500cc	First pole	Last pole
1	ESP	**Marc Márquez***	78	2013–	2013 MotoGP Grand Prix of the Americas	2026 MotoGP Australian Grand Prix
2	AUS	Mick Doohan*	58	1989–1999	1990 500cc Spanish Grand Prix	1998 500cc Argentine Grand Prix
3	ITA	Valentino Rossi*	55	2000–2021	2001 500cc South African Grand Prix	2018 MotoGP Italian Grand Prix
4	ESP	Jorge Lorenzo*	43	2008–2019	2008 MotoGP Qatar Grand Prix	2018 MotoGP Aragon Grand Prix
5	AUS	Casey Stoner*	39	2006–2012	2006 MotoGP Qatar Grand Prix	2012 MotoGP Australian Grand Prix
6	ESP	Dani Pedrosa†	31	2006–2018; 2021; 2023–2024	2006 MotoGP Chinese Grand Prix	2017 MotoGP Malaysian Grand Prix
7	USA	Kevin Schwantz*	29	1986–1995	1989 500cc Australian Grand Prix	1994 500cc Spanish Grand Prix
8	ITA	**Francesco Bagnaia***	28	2019–	2021 MotoGP Qatar Grand Prix	2026 MotoGP French Grand Prix
9	USA	Freddie Spencer*	27	1980–1987; 1989; 1993	1982 500cc Spanish Grand Prix	1986 500cc Spanish Grand Prix
10	ESP	**Jorge Martín***	24	2021–	2021 MotoGP Doha Grand Prix	2026 MotoGP Japanese Grand Prix
11	ITA	Max Biaggi†	23	1998–2005	1998 500cc Japanese Grand Prix	2004 MotoGP German Grand Prix
12	FRA	**Fabio Quartararo***	21	2019–	2019 MotoGP Spanish Grand Prix	2025 MotoGP Australian Grand Prix
13	UK	Barry Sheene*	19	1974–1984	1975 500cc Dutch TT	1982 500cc Yugoslavian Grand Prix
13	AUS	Wayne Gardner*	19	1983–1992	1986 500cc British motorcycle Grand Prix	1990 500cc British motorcycle Grand Prix
15	USA	Kenny Roberts*	18	1978–1983	1978 500cc Spanish Grand Prix	1983 500cc San Marino Grand Prix
15	USA	Eddie Lawson*	18	1983–1992	1984 500cc Spanish Grand Prix	1992 500cc British Grand Prix
17	USA	Wayne Rainey*	15	1988–1993	1988 500cc United States Grand Prix	1993 500cc Czech Republic Grand Prix
17	ESP	**Maverick Viñales**†	15	2015–	2017 MotoGP Qatar Grand Prix	2024 MotoGP Grand Prix of the Americas
17	ITA	**Marco Bezzecchi**	15	2022–	2022 MotoGP Thailand Grand Prix	2026 MotoGP Portuguese Grand Prix
20	ESP	Sete Gibernau	13	1997–2006; 2009	2000 500cc South African Grand Prix	2006 MotoGP Italian Grand Prix
20	ITA	Loris Capirossi†	13	1995–1996; 2000–2011	2000 500cc Dutch TT	2006 MotoGP Japanese Grand Prix
22	VEN	Johnny Cecotto†	12	1976–1980	1977 500cc Venezuelan Grand Prix	1979 500cc Belgian Grand Prix
23	USA	Kenny Roberts Jr.*	10	1996–2007	1999 500cc Japanese Grand Prix	2004 MotoGP Rio de Janeiro Grand Prix
24	ITA	Marco Lucchinelli*	9	1976–1986	1980 500cc Nations Grand Prix	1981 500cc Finnish Grand Prix
24	USA	John Kocinski†	9	1989; 1991–1994; 1998–1999	1991 500cc Vitesse du Mans Grand Prix	1999 500cc Malaysian Grand Prix
24	ESP	Àlex Crivillé*	9	1992–2001	1995 500cc Dutch TT	1999 500cc Imola Grand Prix
27	ITA	Luca Cadalora†	8	1989; 1993–2000	1993 500cc Italian Grand Prix	1995 500cc European Grand Prix
27	FRA	**Johann Zarco**†	8	2017–	2017 MotoGP Dutch TT	2022 MotoGP British Grand Prix
29	FIN	Teuvo Länsivuori	7	1974–1978	1974 500cc Dutch TT	1976 500cc Czechoslovak Grand Prix
29	JPN	Tadayuki Okada	7	1996–2000; 2008	1996 500cc Malaysian Grand Prix	1999 500cc South African Grand Prix
29	ITA	Andrea Dovizioso†	7	2008–2022	2010 MotoGP Japanese Grand Prix	2018 MotoGP Japanese Grand Prix
29	ESP	**Aleix Espargaró**	7	2009–2010; 2012–2026	2014 MotoGP Dutch TT	2024 MotoGP British Grand Prix
33	ITA	Giacomo Agostini*	6	1965–1977	1974 500cc Austrian Grand Prix	1976 500cc Finnish Grand Prix
33	FRA	Christian Sarron†	6	1979; 1981; 1985–1990	1987 500cc French Grand Prix	1988 500cc French Grand Prix
35	USA	Randy Mamola	5	1979–1990; 1992	1980 500cc Belgian Grand Prix	1987 500cc Portuguese Grand Prix
35	BRA	Alex Barros	5	1990–2005; 2007	2000 500cc Italian Grand Prix	2005 MotoGP Portuguese Grand Prix
35	USA	Nicky Hayden*	5	2003–2016	2005 MotoGP United States Grand Prix	2007 MotoGP Portuguese Grand Prix
38	UK	Phil Read*	4	1961–1964; 1971; 1973–1976	1974 500cc French Grand Prix	1974 500cc Czechoslovak Grand Prix
38	NZL	Graeme Crosby	4	1980–1982	1981 500cc Austrian Grand Prix	1982 500cc Austrian Grand Prix
38	UK	**Cal Crutchlow**	4	2011–2023; 2026	2013 MotoGP Dutch TT	2018 MotoGP Spanish Grand Prix
41	ESP	Carlos Checa	3	1995–2007; 2010	1998 500cc Spanish Grand Prix	2004 MotoGP Qatar Grand Prix
41	JPN	Makoto Tamada	3	2003–2007	2004 MotoGP Portuguese Grand Prix	2004 MotoGP Valencian Grand Prix
41	AUS	Chris Vermeulen	3	2005–2009; 2012	2006 MotoGP Turkish Grand Prix	2007 MotoGP Dutch TT
41	USA	Colin Edwards	3	2003–2014	2007 MotoGP French Grand Prix	2008 MotoGP Chinese Grand Prix
41	ESP	**Pol Espargaró**†	3	2014–2026	2020 MotoGP Styrian Grand Prix	2021 MotoGP British Grand Prix
41	ITA	**Fabio Di Giannantonio**	3	2022–	2022 MotoGP Italian Grand Prix	2026 MotoGP United States Grand Prix
41	ESP	**Álex Márquez**†	3	2020–	2023 MotoGP Argentine Grand Prix	2026 MotoGP Malaysian Grand Prix
48	NED	Jack Middelburg	2	1977–1983	1980 500cc Dutch TT	1982 500cc Belgian Grand Prix
48	FRA	Raymond Roche	2	1977–1983	1984 500cc British Grand Prix	1984 500cc San Marino Grand Prix
48	JPN	Tadahiko Taira	2	1984–1985; 1987–1991	1988 500cc Japanese Grand Prix	1989 500cc Japanese Grand Prix
48	USA	Doug Chandler	2	1991–1994	1992 500cc Hungarian Grand Prix	1992 500cc French Grand Prix
48	FRA	Jean-Michel Bayle	2	1996–1999; 2002	1996 500cc Czech Republic Grand Prix	1998 500cc Imola Grand Prix
48	NED	Jurgen van den Goorbergh	2	1997–2002; 2005	1999 500cc Catalan Grand Prix	1999 500cc Czech Republic Grand Prix
48	UK	Jeremy McWilliams	2	1993–1996; 2000; 2002–2005; 2007	2000 500cc Australian motorcycle Grand Prix	2002 MotoGP Australian motorcycle Grand Prix
48	ITA	Marco Simoncelli†	2	2010–2011	2011 MotoGP Catalan Grand Prix	2011 MotoGP Dutch TT
48	ITA	Andrea Iannone	2	2013–2019; 2024	2015 MotoGP Italian Grand Prix	2016 MotoGP Austrian Grand Prix
48	ITA	**Franco Morbidelli**†	2	2018–	2020 MotoGP Catalan Grand Prix	2020 MotoGP Valencian Grand Prix
48	AUS	**Jack Miller**	2	2015–	2018 MotoGP Argentine Grand Prix	2022 MotoGP San Marino Grand Prix
48	ITA	**Luca Marini**	2	2021–	2023 MotoGP Indonesian Grand Prix	2023 MotoGP Qatar Grand Prix
48	ITA	**Enea Bastianini**†	2	2021–	2022 MotoGP Austrian Grand Prix	2024 MotoGP Portuguese Grand Prix
48	ESP	**Pedro Acosta**†	2	2024–	2024 MotoGP Japanese Grand Prix	2026 MotoGP Catalan Grand Prix
62	AUS	Jack Findlay	1	1958–1978	1974 500cc Isle of Man TT	1974 500cc Isle of Man TT
62	UK	Tony Rutter	1	1974–1975	1975 500cc Isle of Man TT	1975 500cc Isle of Man TT
62	ITA	Gianfranco Bonera	1	1973–1975; 1977–1978; 1980	1975 500cc Finnish Grand Prix	1975 500cc Finnish Grand Prix
62	UK	John Williams	1	1968–1978	1976 500cc Isle of Man TT	1976 500cc Isle of Man TT
62	ITA	Virginio Ferrari	1	1976–1979; 1982–1985	1976 500cc German Grand Prix	1976 500cc German Grand Prix
62	USA	Steve Baker	1	1977–1978	1977 500cc French Grand Prix	1977 500cc French Grand Prix
62	SUI	Philippe Coulon	1	1974; 1976–1983	1977 500cc Belgian Grand Prix	1977 500cc Belgian Grand Prix
62	FRA	Michel Rougerie	1	1973–1980	1978 500cc British Grand Prix	1978 500cc British Grand Prix
62	USA	Mike Baldwin	1	1979; 1981; 1985–1988	1979 500cc Spanish Grand Prix	1979 500cc Spanish Grand Prix
62	NED	Boet van Dulmen	1	1975–1986	1979 500cc Finnish Grand Prix	1979 500cc Finnish Grand Prix
62	ITA	Graziano Rossi	1	1977–1982	1980 500cc Finnish Grand Prix	1980 500cc Finnish Grand Prix
62	FRA	Jean Lafond	1	1982–1983	1982 500cc French Grand Prix	1982 500cc French Grand Prix
62	ITA	Franco Uncini*	1	1979–1985	1982 500cc Nations Grand Prix	1982 500cc Nations Grand Prix
62	UK	Ron Haslam	1	1977–1980; 1982–1991; 1993; 2000	1984 500cc Swedish Grand Prix	1984 500cc Swedish Grand Prix
62	UK	Niall Mackenzie	1	1986–1994	1987 500cc Japanese Grand Prix	1987 500cc Japanese Grand Prix
62	AUS	Kevin Magee	1	1987–1991; 1993	1988 500cc Spanish Grand Prix	1988 500cc Spanish Grand Prix
62	JPN	Shinichi Ito	1	1988–1996; 1999; 2002; 2005; 2007; 2011	1993 500cc German Grand Prix	1993 500cc German Grand Prix
62	NZL	Simon Crafar	1	1993; 1998–1999	1998 500cc British Grand Prix	1998 500cc British Grand Prix
62	JPN	Tetsuya Harada†	1	1999–2000; 2002	1999 500cc Italian Grand Prix	1999 500cc Italian Grand Prix
62	FRA	Régis Laconi	1	1997–2000; 2002	1999 500cc Valencian motorcycle Grand Prix	1999 500cc Valencian motorcycle Grand Prix
62	AUS	Garry McCoy	1	1998–2004; 2006	2000 500cc Portuguese Grand Prix	2000 500cc Portuguese Grand Prix
62	JPN	Tohru Ukawa	1	2001–2005	2001 500cc Rio de Janeiro Grand Prix	2001 500cc Rio de Janeiro Grand Prix
62	FRA	Olivier Jacque†	1	2001–2005; 2007	2002 MotoGP German Grand Prix	2002 MotoGP German Grand Prix
62	JPN	Daijiro Kato†	1	2002–2003	2002 MotoGP Pacific Grand Prix	2002 MotoGP Pacific Grand Prix
62	UK	John Hopkins	1	2002–2008; 2011	2006 MotoGP Dutch TT	2006 MotoGP Dutch TT
62	USA	Ben Spies	1	2008–2013	2010 MotoGP Indianapolis Grand Prix	2010 MotoGP Indianapolis Grand Prix
62	ESP	Álvaro Bautista†	1	2010–2018; 2023	2012 MotoGP British motorcycle Grand Prix	2012 MotoGP British motorcycle Grand Prix
62	GER	Stefan Bradl†	1	2012–2016; 2018–2024	2013 MotoGP United States Grand Prix	2013 MotoGP United States Grand Prix
62	JPN	**Takaaki Nakagami**	1	2018–2026	2020 MotoGP Teruel Grand Prix	2020 MotoGP Teruel Grand Prix
62	POR	Miguel Oliveira	1	2019–2025	2020 MotoGP Portuguese Grand Prix	2020 MotoGP Portuguese Grand Prix
62	JPN	**Ai Ogura**†	1	2025–	2026 MotoGP Czech Republic Grand Prix	2026 MotoGP Czech Republic Grand Prix
62	ESP	**Raúl Fernández**	1	2022–	2026 MotoGP Indonesian Grand Prix	2026 MotoGP Indonesian Grand Prix

== By nationality ==
As of the 2026 MotoGP Portuguese Grand Prix

Rank	Country	Poles	Rider(s)
1	Spain	233	14
2	Italy	181	19
3	United States	144	14
4	Australia	124	8
5	France	43	9
6	United Kingdom	34	9
7	Japan	18	9
8	Venezuela	12	1
9	Finland	7	1
10	New Zealand	5	2
10	Netherlands	5	3
10	Brazil	5	1
13	Switzerland	1	1
13	Germany	1	1
13	Portugal	1	1
