= Werner Giger =

Swiss motorcycle racer (1949–1974)

- Nationality: (Switzerland) Swiss
- Born: April 17, 1949 (age 77); Pratteln, Switzerland
- Died: July 30, 1974 (age 52); Hämeenlinna, Finland
Motorcycle racing career statistics
Grand Prix motorcycle racing
Active years	1973–1974
First race	1973 250cc Austrian Grand Prix
Last race	1974 500cc Finnish Grand Prix
Starts / Wins / Podiums / Poles / F. laps / Points; 15 / 0 / 2 / 0 / 0 / 72

Werner Giger (17 April 1949–30 July 1974) was a Grand Prix motorcycle road racer from Switzerland. His best year was in 1973 when he finished in fourth place in the 500cc world championship. Giger was killed in 1974 during practice for a race in Hämeenlinna, Finland.

== Grand Prix motorcycle racing results ==
Points system from 1969 onwards:

**Position**	1	2	3	4	5	6	7	8	9	10
**Points**	15	12	10	8	6	5	4	3	2	1

(key) (Races in bold indicate pole position; races in italics indicate fastest lap)

Year	Class	Team	1	2	3	4	5	6	7	8	9	10	11	12	Points	Rank	Wins
1973	250cc	Yamaha	FRA -	AUT; 10	GER -		IOM -	YUG -	NED -	BEL -	CZE -	SWE -	FIN -	ESP; 5	7	27th	0
1973	500cc	Yamaha	FRA -	AUT; 6	GER; 2		IOM -	YUG; 5	NED; 6	BEL -	CZE -	SWE; 5	FIN; 7	ESP; 3	44	4th	0
1974	350cc	Yamaha	FRA -	GER -	AUT -	NAT; 8	IOM -	NED -		SWE -	FIN; 6		YUG -	ESP -	8	27th	0
1974	500cc	Yamaha	FRA -	GER -	AUT -	NAT; 7	IOM -	NED; 9	BEL -	SWE; 7	FIN; 8	CZE -			13	17th	0
