= Gerhard Thurow =

German motorcycle racer

- Nationality: German
Motorcycle racing career statistics
Grand Prix motorcycle racing
Active years	1969 - 1970, 1972 - 1975
First race	1969 50cc West German Grand Prix
Last race	1975 50cc Yugoslavian Grand Prix
First win	1974 50cc Belgian Grand Prix
Last win	1974 50cc Belgian Grand Prix
Team	Kreidler
Starts / Wins / Podiums / Poles / F. laps / Points; 12 / 1 / 4 / 2 / 0 / 131

Gerhard Thurow (2 November 1934 – 11 April 1976 in Tilburg) was a former Grand Prix motorcycle road racer from Germany. His best years were in 1974 and 1975 when he finished both seasons in fourth place in the 50cc world championship. On 11 April 1976, Thurow died in a crash during a race in Tilburg.
