= Benjamin Grau =

Spanish motorcycle racer

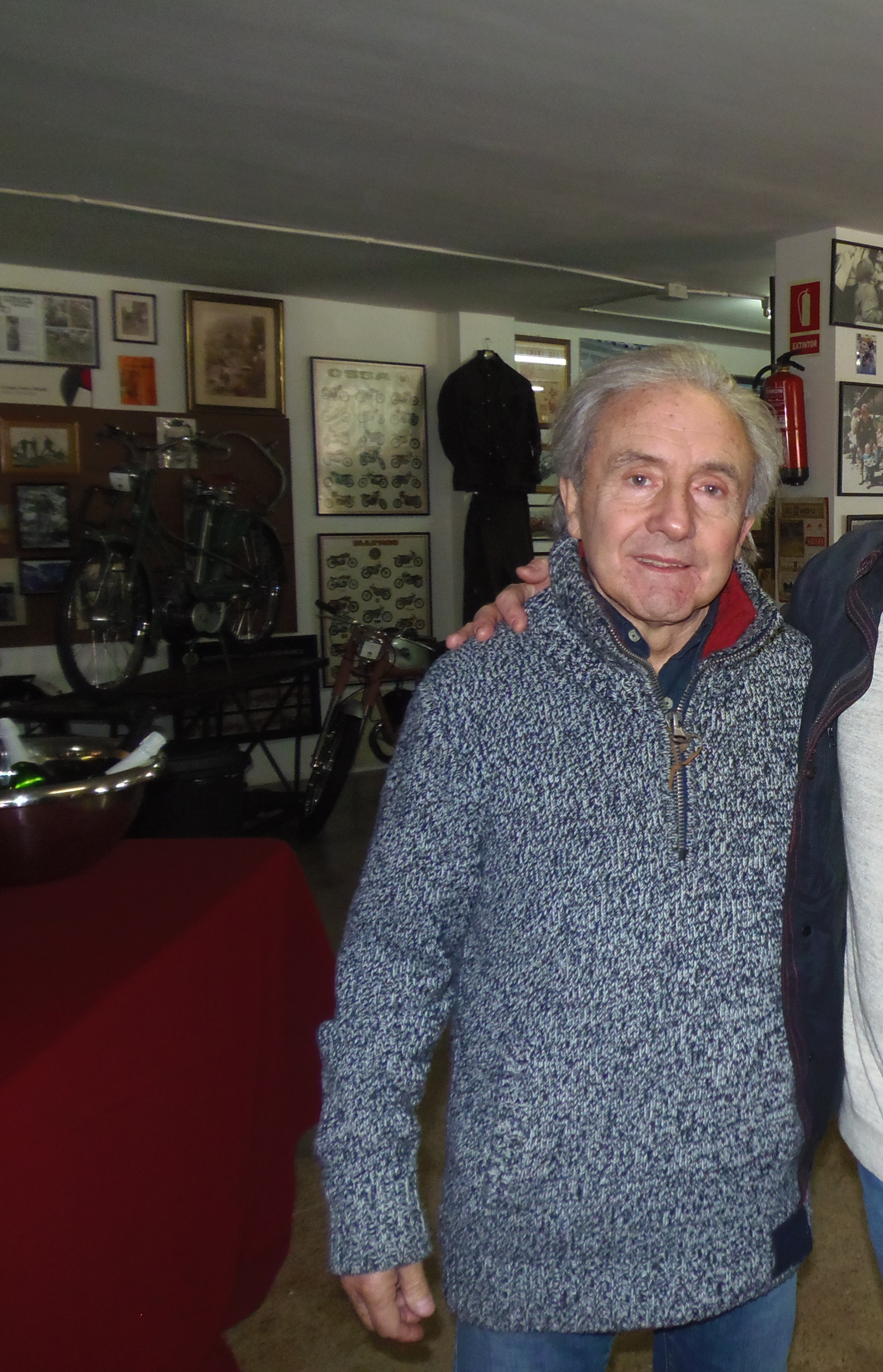
- Min Grau 2017
- Nationality: Spanish
Motorcycle racing career statistics
Grand Prix motorcycle racing
Active years	1967, 1970 - 1972, 1974 - 1975
First race	1967 50cc Spanish Grand Prix
Last race	1975 250cc Spanish Grand Prix
First win	1974 125cc Spanish Grand Prix
Last win	1974 125cc Spanish Grand Prix
Team(s)	Bultaco, Derbi
Championships	0
Starts / Wins / Podiums / Poles / F. laps / Points; 11 / 1 / 3 / 1 / 2 / 71

Benjamin Grau y Marín (born August 19, 1945 in Barcelona, Spain) is a former Grand Prix motorcycle road racer. His best year was 1974, when he won the 125cc Spanish Grand Prix and finished in ninth place in the 125cc class.

Grau also competed successfully in motorcycle endurance racing. He was a three-time winner of the Montjuic 24-hour endurance race. He teamed up with Juan Parés on an 250cc Ossa to win the 1969 Montjuich 24-hour race, then teamed with Juan Bordons on a 500cc Bultaco to win the 1972 24 Hours of Montjuich. He then teamed up with Salvador Cañellas on a Ducati to win the 1975 Montjuic 24-hour endurance race, and then teamed up with Virginio Ferrari to win the 1975 1000 km du Mugello race, also on a Ducati.
