= 1974 Isle of Man TT =

Annual motorcycle racing event

The 1974 Isle of Man TT motorcycle road races were held between 2-8 June 1973 on the 37-mile Snaefell Mountain Course. It was the fifth round of the 1974 FIM Motorcycle Grand Prix World Championship (now MotoGP).

1974 saw an increasing number of World Championship contenders join the reigning 500cc World Champion Giacomo Agostini in boycotting the Isle of Man TT event over safety concerns. The Formula 750 race was considered as the premier event, replacing the traditional Senior TT as the final race of the week.

Tony Rutter began the week on 3 June by riding a Yamaha TZ 350 to win the Junior TT for the second consecutive year. In the 1000cc Production Class TT held on 4 June, Mick Grant scored a popular victory riding the motorcycle nicknamed Slippery Sam. The victory marked the fourth of five consecutive Isle of Man TT victories for Slippery Sam. BMW riders Hans-Otto Butenuth and Helmut Dähne unexpectedly finished in second and third place riding BMW R90S motorcycles that were better known for their long-distance touring capabilities than their racing credentials.

On 5 June Charlie Williams rode a Yamaha TZ 250 to win the Lightweight TT for the second consecutive year, while in the 500cc Sidecar TT, Rolf Steinhausen set a new lap record lap, but then retired with a mechanical problem allowing Heinz Luthringshauser and Hermann Hahn to win the race. Inclement weather on 6 June saw the Senior TT race distance reduced to 5 laps as Phil Carpenter took the win riding a Yamaha TZ 350. The final race of the week was the Formula 750 TT, Chas Mortimer won the race riding a Yamaha TZ 350 despite competing against motorcycles with 750cc engine capacities, as two-stroke engine technology began to render four-stroke engines obsolete.

== World championship races ==
=== 1974 Isle of Man Junior TT 350cc final standings ===
Tuesday 3 June 1974 – 5 Laps (188.65 Miles) Mountain Course.

Place	Rider	Machine	Speed	Time	Points
1	(United Kingdom) Tony Rutter	Yamaha TZ 350	104.44 mph	1.48.22.2	15
2	(United Kingdom) Mick Grant	Yamaha TZ 350	102.8 mph	1.50.06.2	12
3	(United Kingdom) Paul Cott	Yamaha TZ 350	101.25 mph	1.51.47.0	10
4	(United Kingdom) Tom Herron	Yamaha TZ 350	101.221 mph	1.51.50.0	8
5	(United Kingdom) Billie Nelson	Yamaha TZ 350	100.9 mph	1.52.10.4	6
6	(United Kingdom) Billy Guthrie	Yamaha TZ 350	100.39 mph	1.52.44.8	5
7	(United Kingdom) Alan Rogers	Yamaha TZ 350	99.83 mph	1.53.22.8	4
8	(United Kingdom) Roger Nichols	Yamaha TZ 350	99.39 mph	1.53.52.8	3
9	(United Kingdom) Phil Gurner	Yamaha TZ 350	99.38 mph	1.53.53.0	2
10	(United Kingdom) Noel Clegg	Yamaha TZ 350	99.3 mph	1.53.59.2	1

=== 1974 Isle of Man Lightweight TT 250cc final standings ===
Wednesday 5 June 1974 – 4 Laps (150.92 Miles) Mountain Course.

Place	Rider	Machine	Speed	Time	Points
1	(United Kingdom) Charlie Williams	Yamaha TZ 250	94.16 mph	1.36.09.8	15
2	(United Kingdom) Mick Grant	Yamaha TZ 250	93.2 mph	1.37.09.2	12
3	(United Kingdom) Chas Mortimer	Yamaha TZ 250	92.85 mph	1.37.31.2	10
4	(United Kingdom) Tom Herron	Yamaha TZ 250	91.41 mph	1.39.03.4	8
5	(United Kingdom) Tony Rutter	Yamaha TZ 250	91.41 mph	1.39.01.2	6
6	(United Kingdom) Peter McKinley	Yamaha TZ 250	90.84 mph	1.39.40.4	5
7	(United Kingdom) Ian Richards	Yamaha TZ 250	90.44 mph	1.40.06.8	4
8	(United Kingdom) Gerry Mateer	Yamaha TZ 250	89.59 mph	1.41.03.8	3
9	(United Kingdom) Brian Warburton	Yamaha TZ 250	89.48 mph	1.41.11.8	2
10	(United Kingdom) Barry Randle	Yamaha TZ 250	89.4 mph	1.41.17.0	1

=== 1974 Isle of Man Sidecar 500cc TT final standings ===
Wednesday 5 June 1974 – 3 Laps (113.00 Miles) Mountain Course.

Place	Rider	Machine	Speed	Time	Points
1	(West Germany) Heinz Luthringshauser/Hermann Hahn	BMW	92.27 mph	1.13.36.2	15
2	(United Kingdom) George O'Dell/Bill Boldison	König	86.21 mph	1.18.46.4	12
3	(United Kingdom) Dick Hawes/Eddie Kiff	Weslake	85.33 mph	1.22.30.8	10
4	(United Kingdom) Mac Hobson/John Armstrong	Yamaha	82.3 mph	1.22.35.0	8
5	(United Kingdom) Trevor Ireson/Geoff Hunt	König	82.2 mph	1.22.37.2	6
6	(United Kingdom) Bill Crook/Stuart Collins	BSA	81.81 mph	1.23.00.6	5
7	(United Kingdom) Malcolm Aldrick/Michael Skeels	Honda	81.27 mph	1.23.33.6	4
8	(United Kingdom) Ron Perry/Adrian Craig	BSA	80.62 mph	1.24.14.2	3
9	(West Germany) Siegfried Schauzu/Wolfgang Kalauch	BMW	78.05 mph	1.27.00.6	2
10	(United Kingdom) Roger Aldous/Peter Lucock	Triumph	77.68 mph	1.27.25.4	1

=== 1974 Isle of Man Senior TT 500cc final standings ===
Thursday 6 June 1974 – 5 Laps (188.65 Miles) Mountain Course.

Place	Rider	Machine	Speed	Time	Points
1	(United Kingdom) Phil Carpenter	Yamaha TZ 350	96.99 mph	1.56.41.6	15
2	(United Kingdom) Charlie Williams	Yamaha TZ 350	96.31 mph	1.57.31.6	12
3	(United Kingdom) Tony Rutter	Yamaha TZ 350	94.35 mph	1.59.57.4	10
4	(United Kingdom) Billy Guthrie	Yamaha TZ 350	92.76 mph	2.02.01.0	8
5	(United Kingdom) Paul Cott	Yamaha TZ 350	92.26 mph	2.02.40.8	6
6	(West Germany) Helmut Kassner	Yamaha TZ 350	90.27 mph	2.05.23.0	5
7	(United Kingdom) Billie Nelson	Yamaha TZ 350	90.19 mph	2.05.30.0	4
8	(United Kingdom) Peter McKinley	Yamaha TZ 350	89.99 mph	2.05.46.8	3
9	(United Kingdom) Selwyn Griffiths	Matchless G50	89.31 mph	2.06.43.6	3
10	(United Kingdom) Geoff Barry	Matchless G50	89.31 mph	2.06.43.8	1

=== 1974 Isle of Man Ultra-Lightweight TT 125cc final standings ===
Thursday 6 June 1974 – 3 Laps (113.19 Miles) Mountain Course.

Place	Rider	Machine	Speed	Time	Points
1	(United Kingdom) Clive Horton	Yamaha TA125	88.44 mph	1.16.47.0	15
2	(United Kingdom) Ivan Hodgkinson	Yamaha TA125	87.68 mph	1.17.27.0	12
3	(United Kingdom) Tom Herron	Yamaha TA125	86.91 mph	1.18.08.6	10
4	(United Kingdom) Ken Daniels	Yamaha TA125	85.67 mph	1.19.16.0	8
5	(United Kingdom) Fred Launchbury	Maico RS-125	85.5 mph	1.19.25.8	6
6	(Netherlands) Jan Kostwinder	Yamaha TA125	85.1 mph	1.19.48.0	5
7	(United Kingdom) Bill Kirkwood	Maico RS-125	83.32 mph	1.21.30.4	4
8	(United Kingdom) Anthony Jones	BSA	83.24 mph	1.21.35.2	3
9	(United Kingdom) Rod Gooch	Yamaha TA125	82.22 mph	1.22.35.8	2
10	(United Kingdom) Barrie Dickinson	Yamaha TA125	82.03 mph	1.22.47.0	1

== Non-championship races ==
=== 1974 Isle of Man Sidecar 750cc TT final standings ===
Monday 3 June 1974 – 3 Laps (113.00 Miles) Mountain Course.

Place	Rider	Machine	Speed	Time
1	(West Germany) Siegfried Schauzu/Wolfgang Kalauch	BMW	96.59 mph	1.10.18.4
2	(West Germany) Heinz Luthringshauser/Hermann Hahn	BMW	91.93 mph	1.11.52.2
3	(United Kingdom) Mick Horsepole/G J Horsepole	Weslake	88.76 mph	1.16.30.6
4	(United Kingdom) John Barker/Chris Emmins	BSA	88.34 mph	1.16.52.6
5	(United Kingdom) Bill Crook/Stuart Collins	BSA	87.61 mph	1.17.30.0
6	(United Kingdom) Roy Bell/Gordon Russell	König	85.98 mph	1.18.59.2
7	(United Kingdom) Barrie Moran/Ken Moran	Norton	85.92 mph	1.19.02.6
8	(United Kingdom) Dave Bexley/B. Tyler	Honda	85.64 mph	1.19.18.0
9	(West Germany) Heinz Schilling/H. Matthews	BMW	84.64 mph	1.21.17.8
10	(United Kingdom) Mick Wortley/R. Crellin	Triumph	83.00 mph	1.21.49.0

=== 1974 Isle of Man TT Production 1000cc final standings ===
Tuesday 4 June 1974 – 3 Laps (113.00 Miles) Mountain Course.

Place	Rider	Machine	Speed	Time
1	(United Kingdom) Mick Grant	"Slippery Sam"	99.72 mph	1.30.48.0
2	(West Germany) Hans-Otto Butenuth	BMW R90S	97.7 mph	1.32.41.0
3	(West Germany) Helmut Dähne	BMW R90S	97.01 mph	1.33.20.6
4	(United Kingdom) Geoff Barry	Norton Commando	96.85 mph	1.33.29.8
5	(United Kingdom) Charlie Williams	Honda CB750	95.61 mph	1.34.42.2
6	(United Kingdom) Abe Walsh	Triumph Trident	95.48 mph	1.34.49.8
7	(United Kingdom) Roger Corbett	Triumph Trident	94.08 mph	1.36.14.6
8	(United Kingdom) Graham Bentman	Norton Commando	93.21 mph	1.37.08.6
9	(United Kingdom) Martin Russell	BSA Rocket 3	90.12 mph	1.40.28.4
10	(United Kingdom) Graham Dixon	Triumph Trident	88.2 mph	1.42.39.6

=== 1974 Isle of Man TT Production 500cc final standings ===
Tuesday 4 June 1974 – 3 Laps (113.00 Miles) Mountain Course.

Place	Rider	Machine	Speed	Time
1	(United Kingdom) Keith Martin	Kawasaki H1 Mach III	93.85 mph	1.36.28.6
2	(United Kingdom) Alan Rogers	Triumph Tiger 100	93.38 mph	1.36.58.0
3	(United Kingdom) Phil Gurner	BSA B50	92.17 mph	1.38.14.4
4	(United Kingdom) Neil Tuxworth	Honda CB350	91.07 mph	1.39.25.4
5	(United Kingdom) Roger Sutcliffe	Suzuki T500	90.58 mph	1.39.57.6
6	(United Kingdom) Tom Loughridge	Suzuki T500	90.43 mph	1.40.08.0
7	(United Kingdom) Chris Revett	Honda CB350	89.56 mph	1.41.06.4
8	(United Kingdom) Alan Jackson Jr.	Suzuki T500	87.47 mph	1.43.31.2
9	(United Kingdom) Tony McGurk	Honda CB350	87.34 mph	1.43.40.2
10	(United Kingdom) Peter Crew	Honda CB350	85.08 mph	1.46.25.4

=== 1974 Isle of Man TT Production 250cc final standings ===
Tuesday 4 June 1974 – 3 Laps (113.00 Miles) Mountain Course.

Place	Rider	Machine	Speed	Time
1	(United Kingdom) Martin Sharpe	Yamaha RD250	86.94 mph	1.44.09.2
2	(United Kingdom) Eddie Roberts	Yamaha RD250	86.9 mph	1.44.11.4
3	(United Kingdom) Bill Rae	Suzuki GT250	85.93 mph	1.45.226.
4	(United Kingdom) Godfrey Benson	Yamaha RD250	84.04 mph	1.47.54.6
5	(United Kingdom) John Kiddie	Honda CB250	83.22 mph	1.48.48.2
6	(United Kingdom) Bill Robertson	Suzuki GT250	81.33 mph	1.51.19.6
7	(United Kingdom) Roger Nicholls	Ducati 250 Mark 3	81.09 mph	1.51.39.4
8	(United Kingdom) Bernard Murray	Benelli 250 2C	80.05 mph	1.53.07.0
9	(United Kingdom) Keith Heckles	Honda CB250	79.00 mph	1.54.37.0
10	(United Kingdom) Tom Christian	Yamaha RD250	78.87 mph	1.54.48.4

=== 1974 Isle of Man Formula 750 Classic final standings ===
Friday 7 June 1974 – 6 Laps (226.38 Miles) Mountain Course.

Place	Rider	Machine	Speed	Time
1	(United Kingdom) Chas Mortimer	Yamaha TZ 350	100.52 mph	2:15:07.2
2	(United Kingdom) Charlie Williams	Yamaha TZ 350	100.41 mph	2:15:15.8
3	(United Kingdom) Tony Rutter	Yamaha TZ 350	100.08 mph	2:15:42.6
4	(United Kingdom) Percy Tait	Triumph Trident	99.66 mph	2:16:16.8
5	(United Kingdom) Billy Guthrie	Yamaha TZ 350	99.65 mph	2:16:17.8
6	(United Kingdom) Austin Hockley	Yamaha TZ 350	98.28 mph	2:18:11.6
7	(United Kingdom) Alex George	Yamaha TZ 350	97.68 mph	2:19:03.0
8	(United Kingdom) Noel Clegg	Yamaha TZ 350	97.2 mph	2:19:44.0
9	(United Kingdom) Doug Lunn	Ducati 750	95.81 mph	2:21:45.4
10	(United Kingdom) Derek Chatterton	Yamaha TZ 350	95.48 mph	2:22:15.4
