= 1974 Grand Prix motorcycle racing season =

Racing world cup

1974 F.I.M. Grand Prix motorcycle racing season

Seasons
- ← 1973 1975 →

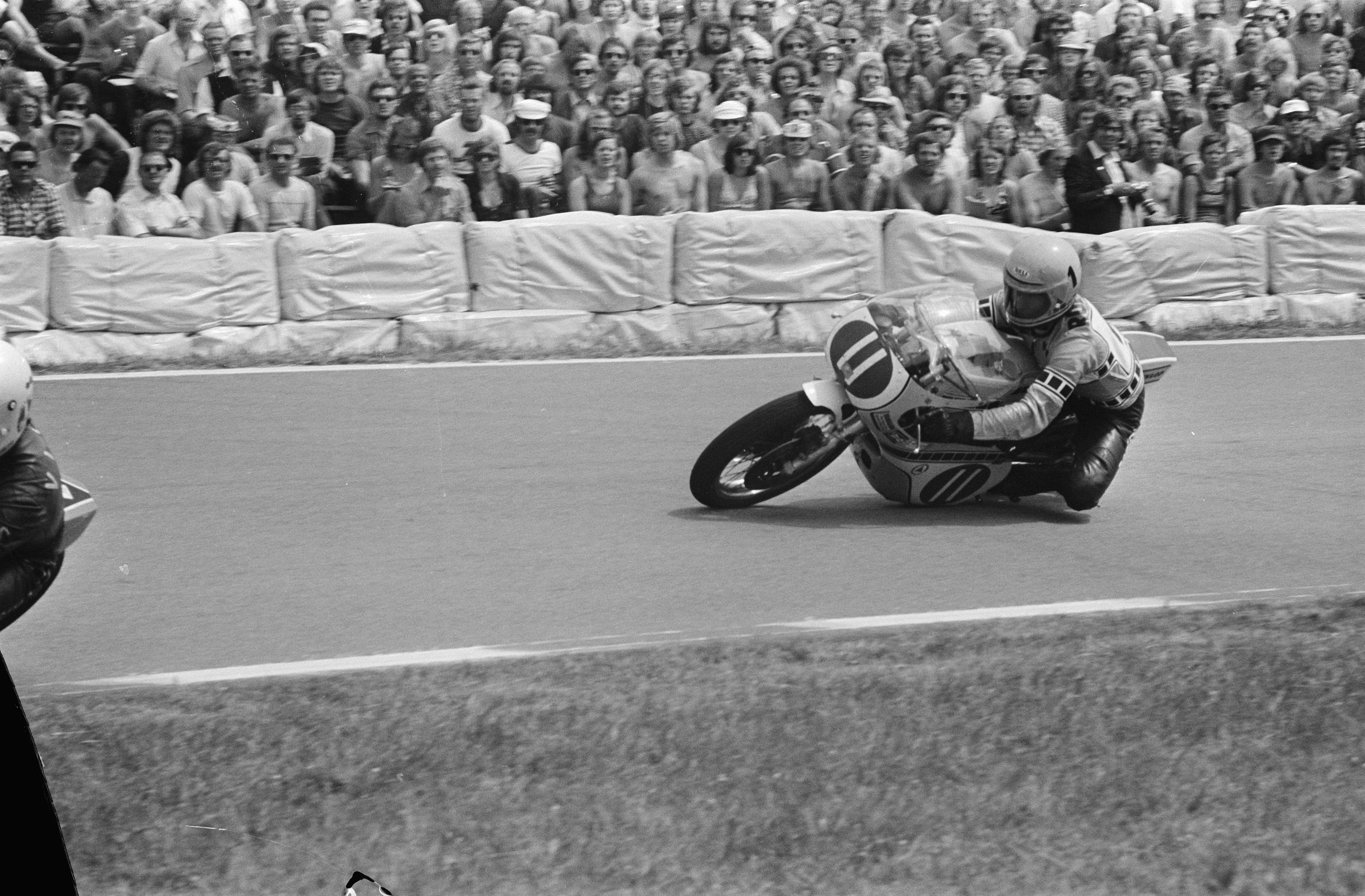
Kenny Roberts (11) in action at the 1974 250cc Dutch TT

The 1974 Grand Prix motorcycle racing season was the 26th F.I.M. Road Racing World Championship season.

== Season summary ==
MV Agusta rider Phil Read won four of ten rounds to successfully defend his 500cc World Championship in 1974 however, the MV Agusta team no longer dominated the series as they faced increasingly strong opposition from the Japanese manufacturers. Before the start of the season, Giacomo Agostini made the decision to leave the MV Agusta team to accept an offer to race for the Yamaha factory racing team. His decision to leave the MV Agusta team after 10 years and 13 World Championships shocked the motorcycle racing community.

Agostini had grown frustrated with teammate Phil Read's role in team politics and came to believe that Read was receiving preferential treatment. He was also frustrated by MV Agusta's lack of development since the death of Count Agusta, as Japanese manufacturers continued to improve two-stroke engine technology, while MV Agusta forged ahead as the last manufacturer to compete with four-stroke engines. Italian motorsports journalists treated his departure from MV Agusta as a treasonous act; however, he wanted to prove that he could win on a two-stroke as well as a four-stroke motorcycle. After negotiations with Yamaha's European racing manager and former World Champion Rod Gould, Agostini signed a six-figure contract to join the Yamaha factory racing team for the 1974 season.

Gianfranco Bonera replaced Agostini on the MV Agusta team after Barry Sheene rejected their contract offer to join the Italian team. Read and Bonera competed on the four-stroke MV 500. Yamaha fielded Agostini and Teuvo Länsivuori aboard the Yamaha YZR500. Hideo Kanaya was due to be Agostini's Yamaha teammate for the 1974 season however, he suffered serious injuries while competing in the pre-season Daytona 200 motorcycle race and, he was forced to withdraw from the championship as he recovered from his injuries. Suzuki introduced the Suzuki RG 500 for riders Barry Sheene and Jack Findlay. The RG 500 would become the dominant machine in the 500 class in the late 1970s, carrying Sheene to two consecutive World Championships in 1976 and 1977.

Agostini made his highly publicized debut with the Yamaha team with victories at the pre-season Daytona 200 and Imola 200 races; however, his first world championship season with Yamaha was marred by crashes and mechanical failures. At the 1974 season-opening round opening round of the 500cc World Championship in France, Agostini was leading the race until he was forced to retire with a gearbox failure, letting Read take the victory. Sheene demonstrated the promise of the new RG 500 with a second-place finish, just 5 seconds behind Read; however, he sustained a broken leg in a crash at the Nations Grand Prix and missed the next six rounds of the World Championship.

Safety continued to be an issue with most riders boycotting the German Grand Prix at the Nürburgring as the track had not been fitted with straw bales to accommodate automobile racing on the same day. Thus, rather unknown German riders took all wins. The boycott served as a focal point in the increasingly bitter debate about safety in the wake of the deaths of Jarno Saarinen and Renzo Pasolini in 1973.

Agostini won the third round in Austria then, was leading the Nations Grand Prix with two laps remaining when he ran out of fuel, allowing Bonera to take the victory. Phil Carpenter won the fifth round at the 1974 Isle of Man TT as most of the championship contenders continued to boycott the event over safety concerns. Agostini won again at the Dutch TT but then Read reclaimed the championship points lead with a resounding victory at the 500cc Belgian Grand Prix where he set a record average lap speed of 220.121 km/h (136.777 mph), finishing over one minute ahead of Agostini in second place. At the 500cc Swedish Grand Prix, Agostini suffered a broken shoulder after colliding with Barry Sheene, allowing his Yamaha teammate Länsivuori to take the victory while Read capitalized on Agostini's misfortune by finishing in second place. Agostini's accident in Sweden marked one of the few times during his career that he suffered a serious injury.

Read took advantage of Agostini's continued misfortune by scoring maximum points with a victory at the Finnish Grand Prix while Agostini recovered from his injury. Agostini returned to compete in the season finale in Czechoslovakia but only managed a sixth-place finish while Read won again to claim his second consecutive 500cc World Championship. The 35-year-old Read was the oldest 500cc World Champion since Leslie Graham won the title in 1949 at the age of 37. Read's teammate Bonera finished the season ranked second in the final classifications with Yamaha teammates Länsivuori and Agostini coming in third and fourth. Despite only finishing four races all year, Agostini claimed two victories in Austria and the Netherlands.

Read's 1974 championship marked the seventeenth consecutive 500cc title for the MV Agusta team, going back to 1958. It also marked the last world championship for the Italian team as well as the last world championship for a four-stroke machine until the advent of the MotoGP class in 2002. After the death of Count Agusta in February 1971, MV Agusta's focus turned to the aviation industry. The Count's passion for motorcycle racing had been the driving force behind the MV Agusta team, and without his presence, the racing team's importance within the company began to wither. 1974 would mark the final world championship in MV Agusta's illustrious history and the team withdrew from Grand Prix racing after the 1975 season.

In the 350cc class, the Yamaha TZ350 dominated so thoroughly that the MV Agusta team chose not to compete for the championship. Agostini won five of the ten rounds to claim his seventh consecutive 350cc World Championship and fourteenth World Championship overall ahead of second place, Dieter Braun. However, Agostini's victory at the Austrian Grand Prix only happened after race leader Chas Mortimer allowed Agostini to pass him for the win. Mortimer also rode a Yamaha and was concerned that the Yamaha factory might deny him support if he defeated their top rider. Agostini's 350 World Championship on the Yamaha marked the first time that a two-stroke powered motorcycle had won the 350 title.

Harley-Davidson rider Walter Villa won the 250cc World Championship against a field of competitors almost exclusively riding Yamaha TZ250 motorcycles. Villa rode the 250cc motorcycle that had been developed by the Italian Aermacchi motorcycle factory along with their rider, Renzo Pasolini. After Harley-Davidson purchased the Aermacchi factory in 1974, its 250cc Grand Prix racer was rebadged as the Harley-Davidson RR250. Villa was the only competitor to win multiple Grand Prix races with four victories to finish ahead of the 1973 champion Dieter Braun in second and Patrick Pons in third.

Rookie Takazumi Katayama won the 250cc Swedish Grand Prix in only the third race of his World Championship career. The 1973 AMA champion, Kenny Roberts, made his world championship debut in a one-off appearance in the 250cc class at the Dutch TT. He made an immediate impression when he claimed pole position during qualifying then, broke Mike Hailwood's seven-year-old lap record while pursuing race leader Walter Villa during the race. Roberts eventually crashed but, recovered to finish on the podium with a third-place finish.

Kent Andersson won his second consecutive 125cc World Championship for Yamaha. Kreidler continued to dominate the 50cc class with Dutchman Henk van Kessel winning the crown.

British rider Billie Nelson died after crashing into the crowd during the 250cc Yugoslavian Grand Prix, injuring several spectators. He died later that night at a hospital.

== 1974 Grand Prix season calendar ==
Round	Date	Race	Location	50cc winner	125cc winner	250cc winner	350cc winner	500cc winner	Report
1	April 21	(France) French Grand Prix	Charade	(Netherlands) Henk van Kessel	(Sweden) Kent Andersson		(Italy) Giacomo Agostini	(United Kingdom) Phil Read	Report
2	April 28	(West Germany) German Grand Prix	Nürburgring Nordschleife	(West Germany) Ingo Emmerich	(West Germany) Fritz Reitmaier	(West Germany) Helmut Kassner	(West Germany) Helmut Kassner	(West Germany) Edmund Czihak	Report
3	May 5	(Austria) Austrian Grand Prix	Salzburgring		(Sweden) Kent Andersson		(Italy) Giacomo Agostini	(Italy) Giacomo Agostini	Report
4	May 19	(Italy) Nations Grand Prix	Imola	(Netherlands) Henk van Kessel	(Spain) Angel Nieto	(Italy) Walter Villa	(Italy) Giacomo Agostini	(Italy) Franco Bonera	Report
5	June 6	(United Kingdom) Isle of Man TT	Snaefell Mountain			(United Kingdom) Charlie Williams	(United Kingdom) Tony Rutter	(United Kingdom) Phil Carpenter	Report
6	June 29	(Netherlands) Dutch TT	Assen	(West Germany) Herbert Rittberger	(Switzerland) Bruno Kneubühler	(Italy) Walter Villa	(Italy) Giacomo Agostini	(Italy) Giacomo Agostini	Report
7	July 7	(Belgium) Belgian Grand Prix	Spa	(West Germany) Gerhard Thurow	(Spain) Angel Nieto	(Sweden) Kent Andersson		(United Kingdom) Phil Read	Report
8	July 21	(Sweden) Swedish Grand Prix	Anderstorp	(Netherlands) Henk van Kessel	(Sweden) Kent Andersson	(Japan) Takazumi Katayama	(Finland) Teuvo Lansivuori	(Finland) Teuvo Lansivuori	Report
9	July 28	(Finland) Finnish Grand Prix	Imatra	(Belgium) Julien van Zeebroeck		(Italy) Walter Villa	(Australia) John Dodds	(United Kingdom) Phil Read	Report
10	August 25	(Czechoslovakia) Czechoslovak Grand Prix	Brno	(Netherlands) Henk van Kessel	(Sweden) Kent Andersson	(Italy) Walter Villa		(United Kingdom) Phil Read	Report
11	September 8	(Socialist Federal Republic of Yugoslavia) Yugoslavian Grand Prix	Opatija	(Netherlands) Henk van Kessel	(Sweden) Kent Andersson	(United Kingdom) Chas Mortimer	(Italy) Giacomo Agostini		Report
12	September 22	(Spain) Spanish Grand Prix	Montjuich	(Netherlands) Henk van Kessel	(Spain) Benjamin Grau	(Australia) John Dodds	(Spain) Víctor Palomo		Report

== Final standings ==
=== Scoring system ===
Points were awarded to the top ten finishers in each race. Only the best of five results were counted in the Sidecars championship, while in the 50cc, 125cc, 250cc, 350cc and 500cc championships, the best of six results were counted.

(key)

Position	1st	2nd	3rd	4th	5th	6th	7th	8th	9th	10th
Points	15	12	10	8	6	5	4	3	2	1

=== 500cc final standings ===
Place	Rider	Team	Machine	FRA (France)	GER (Germany)	AUT (Austria)	NAC (Italy)	MAN (United Kingdom)	HOL (Netherlands)	BEL (Belgium)	SWE (Sweden)	FIN (Finland)	CZE (Czech Republic)	Pts
1	(United Kingdom) Phil Read	MV Agusta	MV500	1	DNS	Ret	3		3	1	2	1	1	82
2	(Italy) Gianfranco Bonera	MV Agusta	MV500	3	DNS	2	1		4	10	4	2	2	69
3	(Finland) Teuvo Länsivuori	Yamaha Motor NV	YZR500	4	DNS	Ret	2		2	Ret	1	3	3	67
4	(Italy) Giacomo Agostini	Yamaha Motor NV	YZR500	Ret	DNS	1	Ret		1	2	Ret		6	47
5	(Australia) Jack Findlay	Suzuki GB	RG500	12	DNS	4	4	Ret	Ret	5	Ret	4	7	34
6	(United Kingdom) Barry Sheene	Suzuki GB	RG500	2	DNS	3	Ret		Ret	Ret	Ret		4	30
7	(West Germany) Dieter Braun	Mitsui Maschinen	TZ350	Ret		5				3			5	22
8	(Finland) Pentti Korhonen	Arwidson Yamaha	TZ350	DNS			Ret	21	7	19	3	5	9	22
9	(United Kingdom) Billie Nelson		TZ350	6		7	8	7	Ret	18	6	Ret	13	21
10	(United Kingdom) Charlie Williams	H. Dugdale Motors	Maxton-TZ350					2	5	Ret	Ret	Ret		18
11	(United Kingdom) John Williams	Gerald E. Brown	Maxton-TZ350	7	DNS	8	Ret		10	7	10	6		18
12	(West Germany) Helmut Kassner		TZ350		2	12		6					20	17
13	(Austria) Karl Auer	Teppichland	TZ350	DNS		6	Ret		6	Ret	5	10	17	17
14	(United Kingdom) Phil Carpenter	Norman Ball	TZ350					1						15
14	(West Germany) Edmund Czihak	Zweirad	TZ350		1									15
16	(France) Michel Rougerie	Harley-Davidson	RR500	5	DNS	Ret				6			8	14
17	(Switzerland) Werner Giger		TZ350	Ret		Ret	7		9	Ret	7	8		13
18	(West Germany) Walter Kaletsch		TZ350	19	3									10
18	(United Kingdom) Tony Rutter	Bob Priest	TZ350					3						10
20	(France) Christian Léon	Elf Kawasaki-France	H1R-RW	13			9			8	Ret	7		9
21	(West Germany) Udo Kochanski	König	König 500		4									8
21	(United Kingdom) Billie Guthrie	Danfay-Yamaha	TZ350					4						8
21	(France) Patrick Pons	Sonauto-Yamaha	YZR500	Ret						4			Ret	8
24	(Italy) Roberto Gallina		TZ350				5							6
24	(United Kingdom) Paul Cott		TZ350					5						6
26	(Spain) Victor Palomo		TZ350			Ret	Ret		8	Ret	8	DNS	11	6
27	(United Kingdom) Alex George	Hermetite Ltd	TZ350			Ret	6	Ret	13	Ret	12	Ret	Ret	5
28	(United Kingdom) Chas Mortimer		TZ350	8		Ret		Ret		Ret			10	4
29	(West Germany) Paul Eickelberg	König	König 500	DNS		9	Ret		12	9		Ret	Ret	4
30	(United Kingdom) Pete McKinley		TZ350					8						3
31	(United Kingdom) Selwyn Griffiths	Ray Cowles Motorcycles	Matchless G50					9						2
31	(Switzerland) Philippe Coulon		TZ350									9		2
31	(France) Ramon Jimenez		TZ350	9										2
31	(United Kingdom) Tom Herron	Thermo King	TZ350			11		15			9	11	16	2
35	(France) Jean Paul Boinet		TZ350	Ret		10	Ret						14	1
35	(United Kingdom) Geoff Barry		TZ350					10						1
35	(France) Philippe Gerard		TZ350	10										1
Place	Rider	Team	Machine	FRA (France)	GER (Germany)	AUT (Austria)	NAC (Italy)	MAN (United Kingdom)	HOL (Netherlands)	BEL (Belgium)	SWE (Sweden)	FIN (Finland)	CZE (Czech Republic)	Pts

=== 1974 350 cc Roadracing World Championship final standings ===
Place	Rider	Number	Country	Machine	Points	Wins
1	(Italy) Giacomo Agostini	1	Italy	Yamaha TZ350	75	5
2	(West Germany) Dieter Braun	2	West Germany	Yamaha TZ350	62	0
3	(France) Patrick Pons	12	France	Yamaha TZ350	47	0
4	(Australia) John Dodds	52	Australia	Yamaha TZ350	31	1
5	(United Kingdom) Chas Mortimer	6	Great Britain	Yamaha TZ350	29	0
6	(Finland) Teuvo Länsivuori	48	Finland	Yamaha TZ350	27	1
7	(Finland) Pentti Korhonen	22	Finland	Yamaha TZ350	25	0
7	(France) Michel Rougerie	7	France	Harley-Davidson RR350	25	0
9	(Spain) Víctor Palomo	43	Spain	Yamaha TZ350	24	1
10	(United Kingdom) Billie Nelson	4	Great Britain	Yamaha TZ350	21	0
11	(United Kingdom) Mick Grant	10	Great Britain	Yamaha TZ350	18	0
12	(Switzerland) Bruno Kneubühler	5	Switzerland	Yamaha TZ350	17	0
13	(United Kingdom) Tony Rutter	11	Great Britain	Yamaha TZ350	16	1
14	(Germany) Helmut Kassner	8	West Germany	Yamaha TZ350	15	1
15	(France) Olivier Chevallier	14	France	Yamaha TZ350	15	0
16	(Italy) Walter Villa	19	Italy	Harley-Davidson RR350	15	0
17	(Germany) Wolfgang Stephan	17	West Germany	Yamaha TZ350	12	0
17	(Italy) Mario Lega	16	Italy	Yamaha TZ350	12	0
19	(France) Christian Bourgeois	18	France	Yamaha TZ350	11	0
20	(United Kingdom) Paul Cott	24	Great Britain	Yamaha TZ350	10	0
20	(Germany) Franz Weidacher	49	West Germany	Yamaha TZ350	10	0
22	(Northern Ireland) Tom Herron	3	Northern Ireland	Yamaha TZ350	10	0
23	(Norway) Kjell Solberg		Norway	Yamaha TZ350	9	0
24	(Austria) Karl Auer	23	Austria	Yamaha TZ350	9	0
25	(United Kingdom) Alex George	9	Great Britain	Yamaha TZ350	8	0
25	(Germany) Walter Kaletsch	20	West Germany	Yamaha TZ350	8	0
27	(Switzerland) Werner Giger	25	Switzerland	Yamaha TZ350	8	0
28	(United Kingdom) Billie Henderson	47	Great Britain	Yamaha TZ350	8	0
29	(United Kingdom) John Williams	13	Great Britain	Yamaha TZ350	7	0
30	(Finland) Tapio Virtanen	30	Finland	Yamaha TZ350	6	0
30	(Germany) Alfred Heck	21	West Germany	Yamaha TZ350	6	0
32	(Switzerland) Hans Mühlebach		Switzerland	Yamaha TZ350	5	0
32	(Italy) Giovanni Proni		Italy	Yamaha TZ350	5	0
32	(Northern Ireland) Billie Guthrie		Northern Ireland	Yamaha TZ350	5	0
32	(Germany) Winfried Fries		West Germany	Yamaha TZ350	5	0
36	(Italy) Giuseppe Elementi		Italy	Yamaha TZ350	4	0
36	(United Kingdom) Alan Rogers		Great Britain	Yamaha TZ350	4	0
36	(Germany) Udo Kochanski		West Germany	Yamaha TZ350	4	0
36	(France) Ramon Jimenez		France	Yamaha TZ350	4	0
36	(United Kingdom) John Newbold		Great Britain	Yamaha TZ350	4	0
41	(Germany) Wolfgang Rubel		West Germany	Yamaha TZ350	3	0
41	(Switzerland) Ulrich Graf		Switzerland	Yamaha TZ350	3	0
41	(United Kingdom) Roger Nicholls		Great Britain	Yamaha TZ350	3	0
41	(France) Gérard Debrock		France	Yamaha TZ350	3	0
45	(United Kingdom) Phil Gurner		Great Britain	Yamaha TZ350	2	0
45	(Netherlands) Nico Van Der Zanden		Netherlands	Yamaha TZ350	2	0
45	(Brazil) Adu Celso-Santos	29	Brazil	Yamaha TZ350	2	0
45	(Germany) Hans-Joachim Dittberner		West Germany	Yamaha TZ350	2	0
49	(Italy) Armando Toracca		Italy	Yamaha TZ350	1	0
49	(United Kingdom) Noel Clegg		Great Britain	Yamaha TZ350	1	0

=== 1974 250 cc Roadracing World Championship final standings ===
Place	Rider	Number	Country	Machine	Points	Wins
1	(Italy) Walter Villa	19	Italy	Harley-Davidson RR250	77	4
2	(West Germany) Dieter Braun	1	West Germany	Yamaha TZ250	58	0
3	(France) Patrick Pons	6	France	Yamaha TZ250	50	0
4	(Japan) Takazumi Katayama	8	Japan	Yamaha TZ250	43	1
5	(Switzerland) Bruno Kneubühler	9	Switzerland	Yamaha TZ250	43	0
6	(United Kingdom) Chas Mortimer	5	United Kingdom	Yamaha TZ250	41	1
7	(Australia) John Dodds	3	Australia	Yamaha TZ250	38	1
8	(Sweden) Kent Andersson	2	Sweden	Yamaha TZ250	34	1
9	(France) Michel Rougerie	7	France	Harley-Davidson RR250	21	0
10	(United Kingdom) Mick Grant	10	United Kingdom	Yamaha TZ250	18	0
10	(Finland) Pentti Korhonen	17	Finland	Yamaha TZ250	18	0
12	(United Kingdom) Charlie Williams	12	United Kingdom	Yamaha TZ250	15	1
13	(Germany) Helmut Kassner	48	West Germany	Yamaha TZ250	15	1
14	(Northern Ireland) Tom Herron	4	Northern Ireland	Yamaha TZ250	14	0
15	(Switzerland) Hans Mühlebach	24	Switzerland	Yamaha TZ250	13	0
16	Horst Lahfeld			Yamaha TZ250	12	
17	Rolf Minhoff			Yamaha TZ250	11	
18	Victor Palomo			Yamaha TZ250	11	
19	Harry Hoffman			Yamaha TZ250	10	
20	Kenny Roberts			Yamaha TZ250	10	
21	Tony Rutter			Yamaha TZ250	10	
22	Fritz Reitmaier			Yamaha TZ250	8	
23	Giovanni Proni			Yamaha TZ250	8	
24	Matti Salonen			Yamaha TZ250	7	
25	Olivier Chevallier			Yamaha TZ250	7	
26	Janos Reisz				6	
27	Tapio Virtanen				6	
28	Pete McKinley				5	
29	Alfred Heck				5	
30	Armando Toracca				5	
31	Jean Louis Guignabodet				4	
32	Ian Richards				4	
33	Reinhard Scholtis				4	
34	Tierry Tchernine				4	
35	H.Kittler				3	
36	Gerry Mateer				3	
37	Paolo Pileri				3	
38	Alex George				2	
39	G.Forderer				2	
40	A.Van Den Broecke				2	
41	Brian Warburton				2	
42	John Williams				2	
43	Leif Gustafsson				2	
44	Jean Paul Boinet				1	
45	Barry Randle				1	
46	Kjell Solberg				1	

=== 1974 125 cc Roadracing World Championship final standings ===
Place	Rider	Number	Country	Machine	Points	Wins
1	(Sweden) Kent Andersson	1	Sweden	Yamaha	87	5
2	(Switzerland) Bruno Kneubühler		Switzerland	Yamaha	63	1
3	(Spain) Angel Nieto	7	Spain	Derbi	60	2
4	(Italy) Otello Buscherini	6	Italy	Malanca	60	0
5	(Netherlands) Henk van Kessel		Netherlands	Bridgestone	30	0
6	(France) Thierry Tchernine		France	Yamaha	25	0
7	(Austria) Harald Bartol		Austria	Suzuki	23	0
8	(Sweden) Leif Gustafsson	4	Sweden	Maico	23	0
9	(Spain) Benjamin Grau		Spain	Derbi	21	1
10	(West Germany) Gert Bender		West Germany	Bender	20	0

=== 1974 50 cc Roadracing World Championship final standings ===
Place	Rider	Number	Country	Machine	Points	Wins
1	(Netherlands) Henk van Kessel	5	Netherlands	Van Veen Kreidler	90	6
2	(West Germany) Herbert Rittberger		West Germany	Kreidler	65	1
3	(Belgium) Julien van Zeebroeck		Belgium	Kreidler	59	1
4	(West Germany) Gerhard Thurow	4	West Germany	Kreidler	57	1
5	(West Germany) Rudolf Kunz	9	West Germany	Kreidler	52	0
6	(Switzerland) Ulrich Graf	7	West Germany	Kreidler	44	0
7	(Netherlands) Jan Bruins		Netherlands	Jamathi	27	0
8	(Italy) Otello Buscherini	8	Italy	Malanca	26	0
9	(Switzerland) Stefan Dörflinger		Switzerland	Kreidler	25	0
10	(Netherlands) Jan Huberts	8	Netherlands	Van Veen Kreidler	25	0

== Other sources ==
- Büla, Maurice & Schertenleib, Jean-Claude (2001). Continental Circus 1949-2000. Chronosports S.A. ISBN 2-940125-32-5
- "The Official MotoGP website". Archived from the original on 2012-09-18.
