= Dieter Braun =

German motorcycle racer (born 1943)

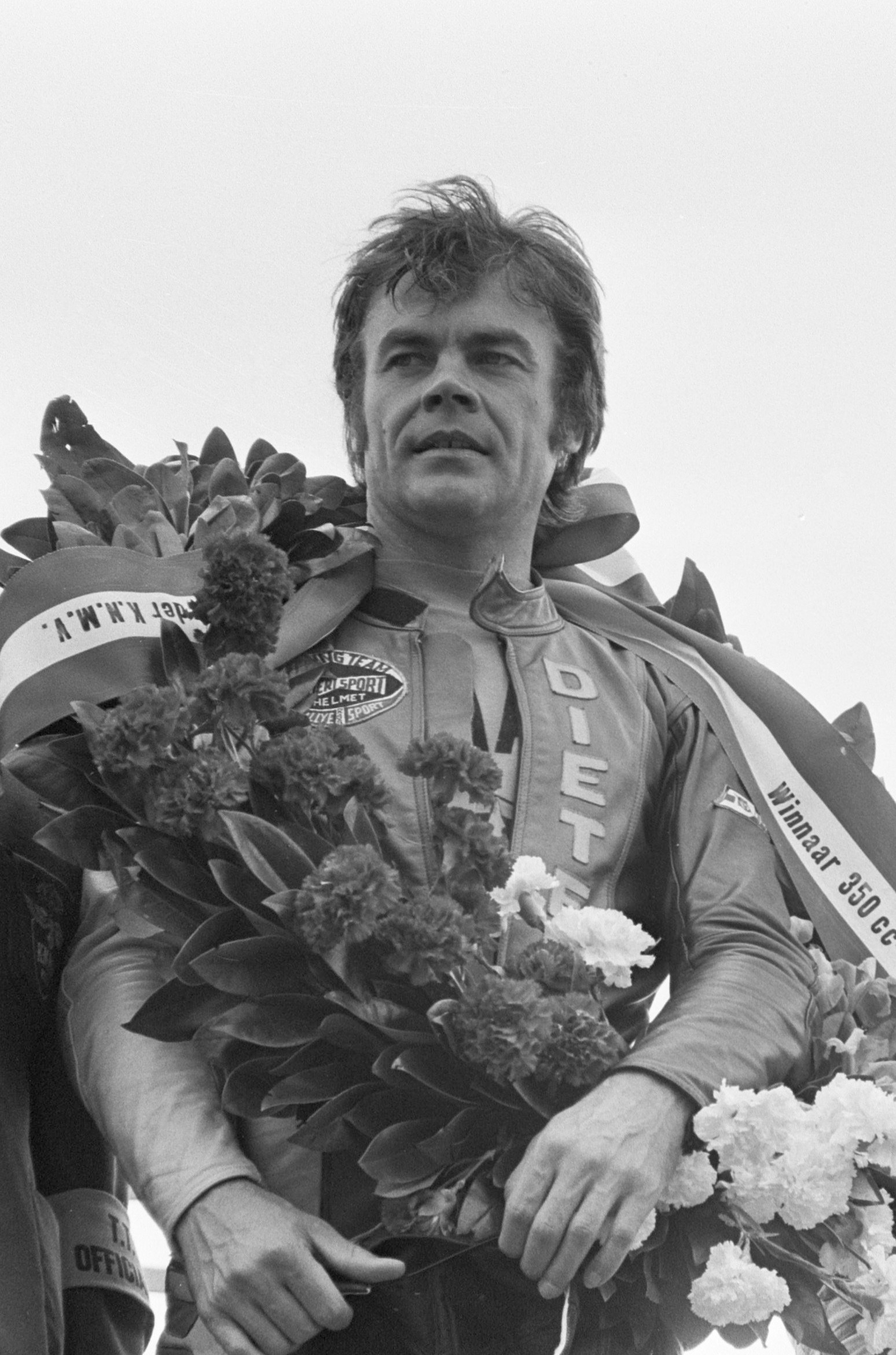
- Dieter Braun in 1975
- Nationality: German
- Born: 2 February 1943 (age 83); Ulm, Germany
Motorcycle racing career statistics
Grand Prix motorcycle racing
Active years	1968 – 1977
First race	1968 125cc West German Grand Prix
Last race	1976 350cc German Grand Prix
First win	1969 125cc Yugoslavian Grand Prix
Last win	1976 250cc Yugoslavian Grand Prix
Team(s)	Suzuki, Yamaha
Championships	125cc – 1970 250cc – 1973
Starts / Wins / Podiums / Poles / F. laps / Points; 112 / 14 / 49 / 0 / 9 / 904

Dieter Braun (born 2 February 1943) is a German former professional motorcycle road racer. He competed in Grand Prix motorcycle racing from 1968 to 1976. He won the 1970 FIM 125cc World Championship for Suzuki. In 1973, he rode a Yamaha TZ 250 to the 250 cc FIM world championship.

Braun was born in Ulm, Bavaria. His victory at the 1970 Isle of Man TT was notable because he was one of only seven riders to have won an Isle of Man TT race in their first attempt. Due to the circuit's 37.7 mile length, it usually takes competitors two or three attempts before they learn its nuances.

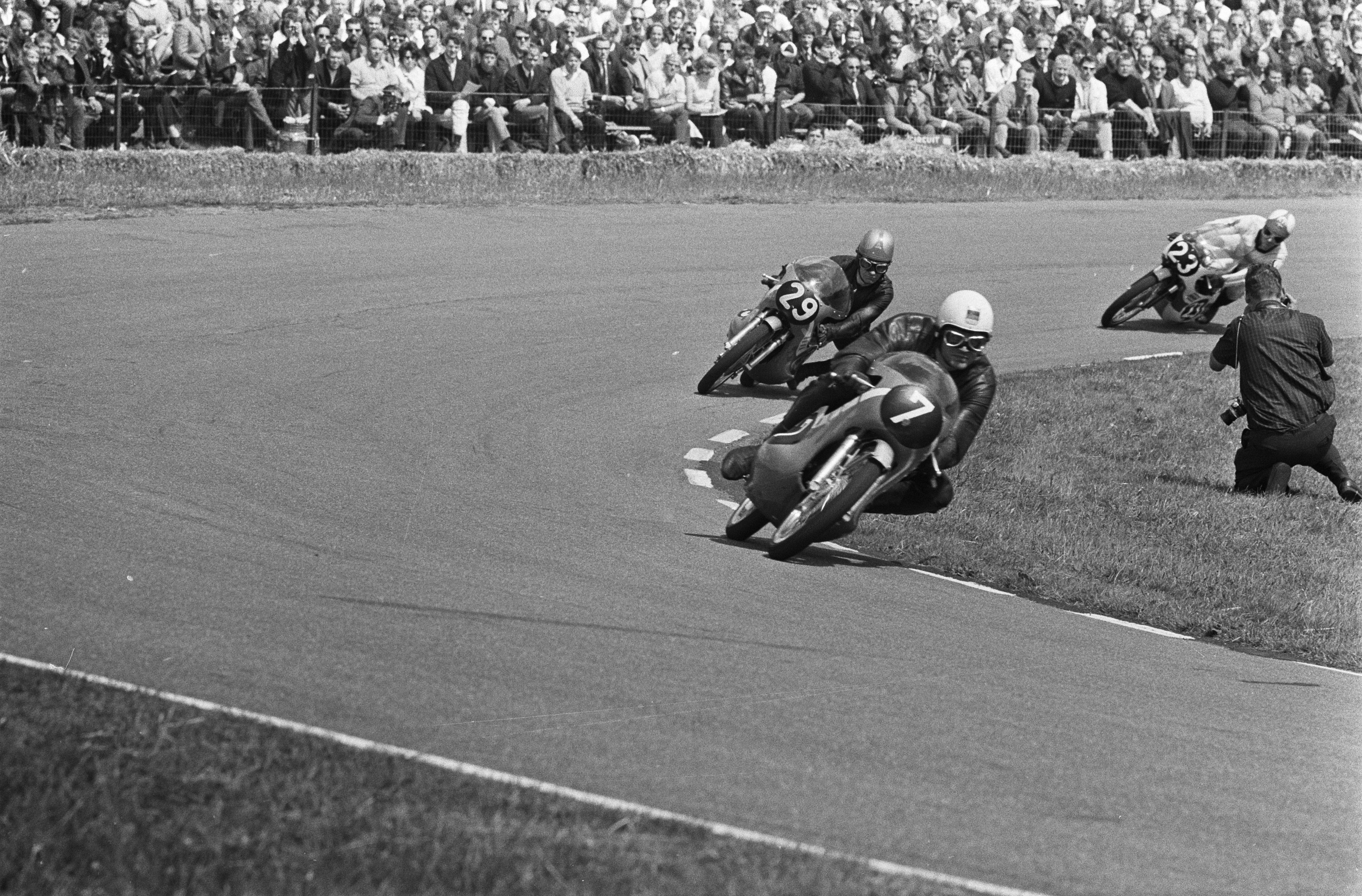
Braun (7) leads Cees van Dongen (29) and Kent Andersson (23) in the 1969 125cc Dutch TT

Braun is also known for an incident that occurred immediately after he won the East German Grand Prix in the 1971 season. As the West German national anthem was being played during the winner's ceremony, the East German crowd began singing the words to the anthem. The East German government reacted by making the following year's East German Grand Prix an invitation only race, and in 1973, the race was stricken from the Grand Prix calendar.

Braun also raced in cars, entering five races with Team Warsteiner Eurorace in the 1975 European Formula Two Championship (effectively starting the race on four of that occasions).

Braun ended his racing career after suffering serious injuries in an accident that also claimed the life of Hans Stadelmann at the Salzburgring during the 1977 350cc Austrian Grand Prix.

== Grand Prix motorcycle racing results ==
Points system from 1950 to 1968:

**Position**	1	2	3	4	5	6
**Points**	8	6	4	3	2	1

Points system from 1969 onwards:

**Position**	1	2	3	4	5	6	7	8	9	10
**Points**	15	12	10	8	6	5	4	3	2	1

(key) (Races in bold indicate pole position; races in italics indicate fastest lap)

Year	Class	Team	1	2	3	4	5	6	7	8	9	10	11	12	13	Points	Rank	Wins
1968	125cc	MZ	GER; 4	ESP -	IOM -	NED; 5	DDR -	CZE; 4	FIN -	ULS; 5	NAT; 6					11	7th	0
1969	125cc	Suzuki	ESP -	GER; 2	FRA -	IOM -	NED -	BEL; 2	DDR -	CZE; 2	FIN; 4		NAT -	YUG; 1		59	**2nd**	1
1969	250cc	MZ	ESP; 7	GER -	FRA -	IOM -	NED; 6	BEL -	DDR -	CZE; 6	FIN; 5	ULS -	NAT -	YUG -		20	10th	0
1970	125cc	Suzuki	GER -	FRA; 1	YUG; 1	IOM; 1	NED; 1	BEL -	DDR; 2	CZE; 2	FIN -		NAT -	ESP; 4		84	**1st**	4
1970	250cc	MZ	GER -	FRA -	YUG -	IOM; NC	NED; 4	BEL -	DDR -	CZE; 8	FIN -	ULS -	NAT; 4	ESP -		19	14th	0
1970	350cc	MZ	GER -		YUG -	IOM; NC	NED -		DDR -	CZE; 5	FIN -	ULS -	NAT; 6	ESP; 5		17	11th	0
1971	125cc	Suzuki	AUT; 4													54	4th	0
1971	125cc	Maico		GER -	IOM -	NED; 4	BEL; 3	DDR; 4	CZE -	SWE; 4	FIN; 2		NAT -	ESP -		54	4th	0
1971	250cc	Yamaha	AUT -	GER -	IOM -	NED; 3	BEL; 3	DDR; 1	CZE -	SWE -	FIN; 3	ULS; 3	NAT -	ESP -		58	5th	1
1971	350cc	Yamaha	AUT -	GER -	IOM -	NED -		DDR -	CZE -	SWE -	FIN -	ULS; 2	NAT -	ESP -		12	16th	0
1972	125cc	Maico	GER -	FRA -	AUT; 7	NAT -	IOM -	YUG -	NED -	BEL; 6	DDR -	CZE; 5	SWE -	FIN; 3	ESP -	25	8th	0
1972	250cc	Maico	GER; 2	FRA; 9	AUT -	NAT -	IOM -	YUG -	NED -	BEL; 4	DDR -	CZE -	SWE -	FIN -	ESP -	22	12th	0
1972	350cc	Yamaha	GER -	FRA; 6	AUT -	NAT; 8	IOM -	YUG; 2	NED; 4		DDR; 3	CZE; 3	SWE; 9	FIN -	ESP -	54	4th	0
1973	250cc	Yamaha	FRA -	AUT -	GER; 4		IOM -	YUG; 1	NED; 1	BEL -	CZE; 1	SWE; 1	FIN; 2	ESP -		80	**1st**	4
1973	350cc	Yamaha	FRA -	AUT; 6	GER -	NAT; 7	IOM -	YUG; 2	NED; 5		CZE; 5	SWE -	FIN -	ESP -		33	8th	0
1974	250cc	Yamaha		GER -		NAT -	IOM -	NED -	BEL; 2	SWE; 5	FIN; 3	CZE; 3	YUG; 3	ESP; 3		58	**2nd**	0
1974	350cc	Yamaha	FRA -	GER -	AUT; 3	NAT -	IOM -	NED; 2		SWE; 4	FIN; 3		YUG; 3	ESP; 2		62	**2nd**	0
1974	500cc	Yamaha	FRA -	GER -	AUT; 5	NAT -	IOM -	NED -	BEL; 3	SWE -	FIN -	CZE; 5				22	7th	0
1975	125cc	Morbidelli	FRA -	ESP -	AUT -	GER -	NAT -		NED -	BEL -	SWE -		CZE -	YUG; 1		15	11th	1
1975	250cc	Yamaha	FRA -	ESP -		GER; 8	NAT; 4	IOM -	NED; 3	BEL; 8	SWE; 6	FIN; 4	CZE; 3	YUG; 1		56	**3rd**	1
1975	350cc	Yamaha	FRA -	ESP; 5	AUT -	GER; 2	NAT; 4	IOM -	NED; 1	BEL -	SWE -	FIN; 5	CZE -	YUG -		47	4th	1
1975	500cc	Yamaha	FRA -	ESP -	AUT; 6	GER; 6	NAT -	IOM -	NED -	BEL -	SWE; 5	FIN -	CZE -	YUG -		16	13th	0
1976	250cc	Yamaha	FRA -		NAT -	YUG; 1	IOM -	NED; 9	BEL; 7	SWE; 2	FIN; 6	CZE; 7	GER; 4	ESP -		42	6th	1
1976	350cc	Morbidelli	FRA -	AUT; 5	NAT -	YUG -	IOM -	NED; 9			FIN; 2	CZE -	GER; 8	ESP -		23	11th	0
1976	500cc	Suzuki	FRA; 8	AUT; 15	NAT; 9		IOM -	NED -	BEL; 6	SWE -	FIN; 6	CZE -	GER -			15	17th	0

=== Literature ===
- Nöbel, Hendrik (2009), Dieter Braun : Weltmeister und Publikumsliebling (in German), Chemnitz: HB-Werbung und Verlag GmbH & Co. KG, ISBN 978-3-00-028612-4
- Rönicke, Frank: Deutsche Motorrad-Welt- und Europameister - von Schorsch Meier bis Stefan Bradl. 1. Auflage, Motorbuch-Verlag, Stuttgart 2012, ISBN 978-3-613-03410-5, p. 136–141
