= Harley-Davidson RR350 =

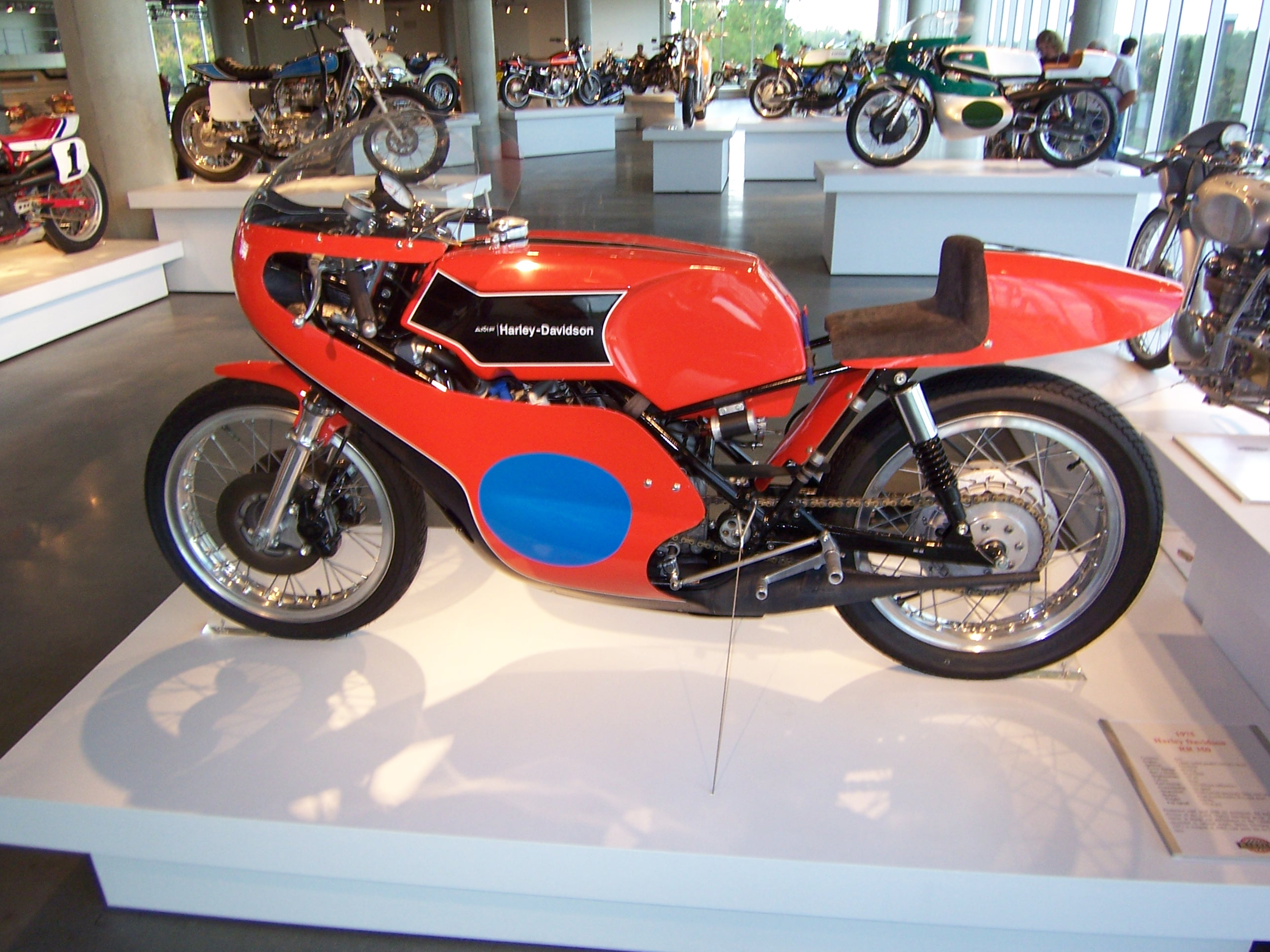
- Manufacturer: Harley-Davidson
- Production: 1974–1976
- Engine: 347 cc (21.2 cu in) two-stroke air-cooled (later water-cooled) parallel twin engine
- Bore / stroke: 68 mm × 50 mm (2.7 in × 2.0 in)
- Compression ratio: 12.0:1
- Power: 70 hp (52 kW) @ 11,400 rpm
- Torque: 32.3 lb⋅ft (43.8 N⋅m)
- Transmission: 6-speed, Chain
- Frame type: Steel tube frame
- Suspension: 34mm Ceriani telescopic forks, twin Girling rear
- Brakes: Drum brakes: 230mm Ceriani 4-leading shoe (front), 230mm Ceriani twin leading shoe (rear)
- Wheelbase: 1,250 mm (49 in)
- Weight: 108–112 kg (238–247 lb) (dry)
- Fuel capacity: 19 L (4.2 imp gal; 5.0 US gal)

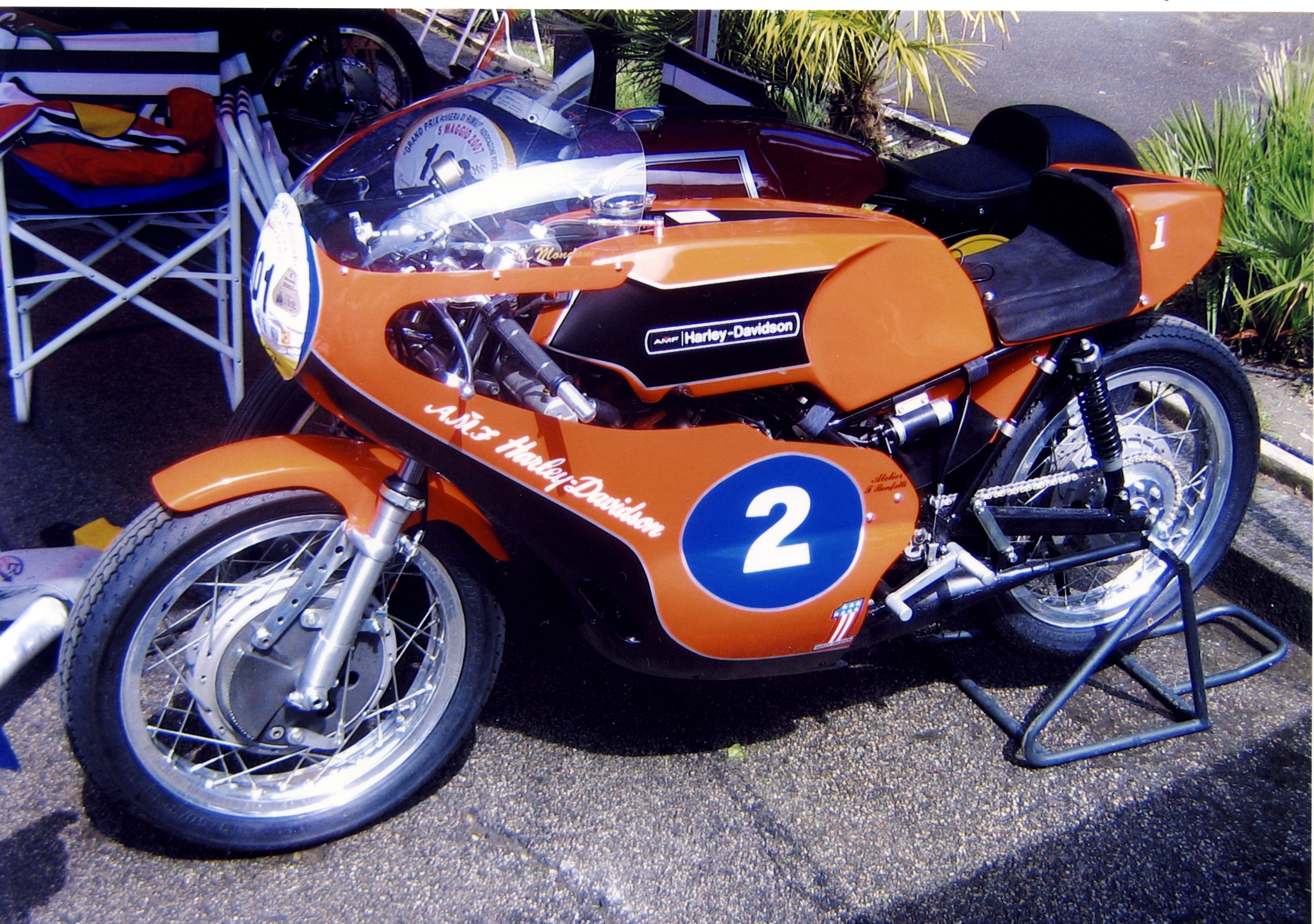
Harley-Davidson RR350

The Harley-Davidson RR350, also known as the Harley-Davidson 350RR, was a racing motorcycle, designed, developed, and built by Harley-Davidson, conforming to the 350cc class regulations of the Grand Prix motorcycle racing world championship, between 1974 and 1976.
