= 1976 German motorcycle Grand Prix =

(West Germany) 1976 German Grand Prix
Race details
- Race 11 of 12 races in the 1976 Grand Prix motorcycle racing season
- Date: 29 August 1976
- Official name: Grosser Preis von Deutschland
- Location: Nürburgring
- Course: Permanent racing facility; 22.835 km (14.189 mi)

500cc
Pole position
Rider	(Italy) Virginio Ferrari	Suzuki
Fastest lap
Rider	(Netherlands) Marcel Ankoné	Suzuki
Time	8:59.900	
Podium
First	(Italy) Giacomo Agostini	MV Agusta
Second	(Italy) Marco Lucchinelli	Suzuki
Third	(United States) Pat Hennen	Suzuki

350cc
Fastest lap
Rider	(Venezuela) Johnny Cecotto	Yamaha
Time	8:57.300	
Podium
First	(Italy) Walter Villa	Harley-Davidson
Second	(Venezuela) Johnny Cecotto	Yamaha
Third	(Italy) Gianfranco Bonera	Harley-Davidson

250cc
Fastest lap
Rider	(Italy) Walter Villa	Harley-Davidson
Time	9:03.200	
Podium
First	(Italy) Walter Villa	Harley-Davidson
Second	(South Africa) Kork Ballington	Yamaha
Third	(South Africa) Jon Ekerold	Yamaha

125cc
Fastest lap
Rider	(West Germany) Anton Mang	Morbidelli
Time	10:12.200	
Podium
First	(West Germany) Anton Mang	Morbidelli
Second	(West Germany) Walter Koschine	Maico
Third	(Belgium) Julien van Zeebroeck	Morbidelli

50cc
Fastest lap
Rider	(Spain) Ángel Nieto	Bultaco
Time	10:26.900	
Podium
First	(Spain) Ángel Nieto	Bultaco
Second	(West Germany) Herbert Rittberger	Kreidler
Third	(Switzerland) Ulrich Graf	Kreidler

Sidecar (B2A)
Fastest lap
Rider	(West Germany) Werner Schwärzel	König
Passenger	(West Germany) Andreas Huber	
Time	11:02.100	
Podium
First rider	(West Germany) Werner Schwärzel	König
First passenger	(West Germany) Andreas Huber	
Second rider	(West Germany) Rolf Steinhausen	Busch-König
Second passenger	(West Germany) Sepp Huber	
Third rider	(United Kingdom) George O'Dell	Yamaha
Third passenger	(United Kingdom) Kenny Arthur	

The 1976 German motorcycle Grand Prix was the eleventh round of the 1976 Grand Prix motorcycle racing season. It took place on 29 August 1976 at the Nürburgring circuit. The 500cc race was known for being the distinguished Giacomo Agostini's 122nd and final victory in Grand Prix motorcycle competition, a record that still stands today.

== 500 cc classification ==
Pos	No.	Rider	Team	Manufacturer	Time	Points
1	1	(Italy) Giacomo Agostini	Team API Marlboro	MV Agusta	1:06'21.400	15
2	32	(Italy) Marco Lucchinelli	Gallina Corse	Suzuki	+52.100	12
3	66	(United States) Pat Hennen	Colemans	Suzuki	+1'09.300	10
4	8	(United Kingdom) John Newbold	Texaco Heron Team Suzuki	Suzuki	+1'12.300	8
5	28	(Netherlands) Marcel Ankoné	Nimag Suzuki	Suzuki	+1'20.800	6
6	29	(Netherlands) Boet van Dulmen	Laponder Racing	Yamaha	+2'41.600	5
7	70	(South Africa) Alan North		Suzuki	+2'56.600	4
8	34	(France) Christian Bourgeois		Yamaha	+2'56.800	3
9	11	(United Kingdom) Chas Mortimer		Suzuki	+4'14.200	2
10	59	(West Germany) Egid Schwemmer		Nava	+4'18.100	1
11	69	(Czechoslovakia) Peter Baláz		Yamaha	+4'35.600	
12	27	(Austria) Max Wiener	Racing Team NO	Yamaha	+4'48.000	
13	25	(United Kingdom) John Cowie		Yamaha	+5'10.500	
14	17	(Austria) Hans Braumandl	MSC Rottenberg	Suzuki	+7'54.000	
15	53	(West Germany) Franz Rau		Yamaha	+7'58.500	
16	52	(West Germany) Walter Hoffmann		Suzuki	+8'45.600	
17	68	(Austria) Michael Schmid	Racing Team Albatros	Yamaha	+9'46.000	
18	37	(United Kingdom) Alan Rogers		Yamaha	+9'51.400	
19	30	(Netherlands) Jan van Disseldorp		Yamaha	+10'51.500	
20	48	(United Kingdom) Charles Dobson		Yamaha	+10'51.700	
21	??	(West Germany) Jürgen Zeddel		Yamaha	+11'31.500	
22	19	(Sweden) Lars Johansson		Yamaha	+11'35.400	
23	??	(West Germany) Adolf Schneider		Yamaha	+11'36.900	
24	??	(West Germany) Hans-Otto Butenuth		Yamaha	+1 lap	
Ret	6	(Australia) Jack Findlay	Jack Findlay Racing	Suzuki	Retired	
Ret	12	(Austria) Karl Auer	Racing Team NO	Yamaha	Retired	
Ret	14	(West Germany) Dieter Braun		Suzuki	Accident	
Ret	??	(Netherlands) Dick Alblas		König	Retired	
Ret	??	(Belgium) Michel Renson		Suzuki	Retired	
Ret	??	(Switzerland) Hans Stadelmann		Suzuki	Retired	
Ret	??	(Denmark) Børge Nielsen		Yamaha	Retired	
Ret	28	(Italy) Virginio Ferrari	Gallina Corse	Suzuki	Retired	
Ret	??	(Belgium) Jean-Philippe Orban		Yamaha	Accident	
Ret	??	(Australia) Victor Soussan		Yamaha	Retired	
Ret	??	(West Germany) Gerhard Vogt		Yamaha	Accident	
Ret	??	(West Germany) Franz Heller		Suzuki	Accident	
Ret	??	(Finland) Teuvo Länsivuori	Life Racing Team	Suzuki	Retired	
Ret	??	(Belgium) Johannes Klement		Yamaha	Retired	
Ret	??	(West Germany) Ulrich Eickmeyer		König	Retired	
Ret	??	(West Germany) Hans-Gunter Schöne		Yamaha	Retired	
Ret	??	(South Africa) Louis With		Yamaha	Retired	
Ret	??	(West Germany) Peter Schrötges		Yamaha	Retired	
Ret	??	(West Germany) Horst Lotz		Suzuki	Retired	
Ret	??	(West Germany) Arndt Hährle		Yamaha	Retired	
Ret	??	(West Germany) Norbert Schüller		König	Retired	
Ret	??	(Australia) Ron Robinson		Suzuki	Retired	
Ret	??	(West Germany) Horst Lahfeld		König	Retired	
Ret	44	(West Germany) Helmut Kassner		Suzuki	Retired	
Ret	??	(West Germany) Volker Begert		König	Retired	
Ret	??	(West Germany) Erich Brandstetter		Yamaha	Accident	
Ret	6	(United Kingdom) Alex George	Hermetite Racing International	Suzuki	Retired	
Ret	??	(Switzerland) Philippe Coulon		Suzuki	Retired	
Ret	??	(East Germany) Bernd Tüngethal		Yamaha	Retired	
DNS	55	(Venezuela) Johnny Cecotto	Team Venemotos	Yamaha	Did not start	
DNS	??	(West Germany) Horst Pleyer		Yamaha	Did not start	
Ret	??	(Netherlands) Kees van der Kruijs		Yamaha	Did not start	

== 350 cc classification ==
Pos	No.	Rider	Manufacturer	Laps	Time	Points
1	42	(Italy) Walter Villa	Harley-Davidson	7	1:04:03.9	15
2	1	(Venezuela) Johnny Cecotto	Yamaha	7	+9.6	12
3	41	(Italy) Gianfranco Bonera	Harley-Davidson	7	+13.4	10
4	32	(Japan) Takazumi Katayama	Yamaha	7	+21.6	8
5	18	(South Africa) Alan North	Yamaha	7	+21.9	6
6	11	(Spain) Víctor Palomo	Yamaha	7	+22.3	5
7	5	(France) Christian Sarron	Yamaha	7	+28.9	4
8	4	(West Germany) Dieter Braun	Morbidelli	7	+31.6	3
9	68	(Switzerland) Bruno Kneubühler	Yamaha	7	+49.9	2
10	43	(France) Olivier Chevallier	Yamaha	7	+1:03.9	1
11	45	(France) Patrick Fernandez	Yamaha	7	+1:44.5	
12	17	(South Africa) Kork Ballington	Yamaha	7	+2:09.5	
13	63	(West Germany) Anton Mang	Yamaha	7	+2:20.7	
14	49	(South Africa) Jon Ekerold	Yamaha	7	+2:42.7	
15	26	(United Kingdom) John Cowie	Yamaha	7	+2:52.8	
16	20	(Austria) Max Wiener	Yamaha	7	+3:29.3	
17	12	(United Kingdom) Alex George	Yamaha	7	+3:30.2	
18	52	(Spain) Jaime Samaranch	Yamaha	7	+3:53.8	
19	53	(West Germany) Horst Pleyer	Yamaha	7	+4:58.1	
20	39	(Sweden) Bo Granath	Yamaha	7	+5:20.0	
54 starters in total, 29 finishers

== 250 cc classification ==
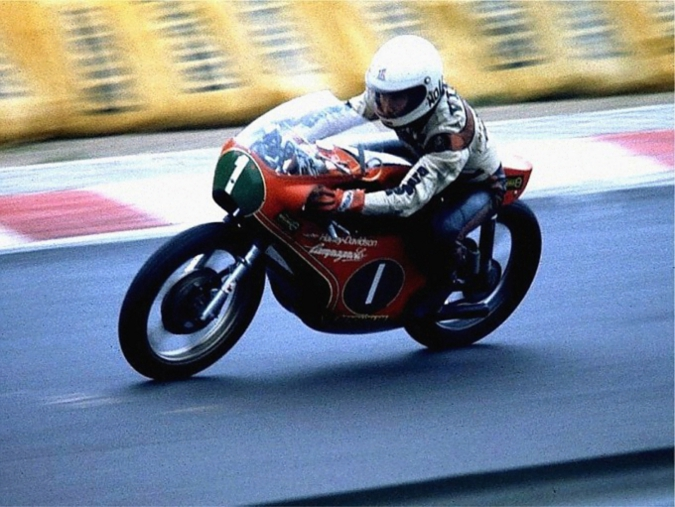
Walter Villa, the eventual winner of the 250 cc race.

Pos	No.	Rider	Manufacturer	Laps	Time	Points
1	1	(Italy) Walter Villa	Harley-Davidson	6	55:34.8	15
2	25	(South Africa) Kork Ballington	Yamaha	6	+1:08.3	12
3	47	(South Africa) Jon Ekerold	Yamaha	6	+1:09.4	10
4	8	(West Germany) Dieter Braun	Yamaha	6	+1:10.5	8
5	9	(Switzerland) Bruno Kneubühler	Yamaha	6	+1:10.8	6
6	37	(France) Olivier Chevallier	Yamaha	6	+1:21.1	5
7	29	(Japan) Takazumi Katayama	Yamaha	6	+1:33.9	4
8	11	(Spain) Víctor Palomo	Yamaha	6	+1:49.8	3
9	44	(Finland) Pentti Korhonen	Yamaha	6	+1:55.2	2
10	6	(United Kingdom) Chas Mortimer	Yamaha	6	+2:08.8	1
11	66	(West Germany) Bernd Tügenthal	Yamaha	6	+2:09.0	
12	73	(France) Gilbert Lavelle	Yamaha	6	+2:10.9	
13	23	(Switzerland) Franz Kunz	Yamaha	6	+2:16.7	
14	13	(United Kingdom) Tom Herron	Yamaha	6	+3:01.2	
15	45	(Netherlands) Henk van Kessel	Yamaha	6	+3:02.8	
16	4	(Sweden) Leif Gustafsson	Yamaha	6	+3:43.3	
17	52	(Australia) John Dodds	Yamaha	6	+3:43.5	
18	33	(Sweden) Bo Granath	Yamaha	6	+3:54.1	
19	12	(Austria) Harald Bartol	Yamaha	6	+4:16.1	
20	34	(Japan) Ken Nemoto	Yamaha	6	+4:19.7	
55 starters in total, 33 finishers

== 125 cc classification ==
Pos	No.	Rider	Manufacturer	Laps	Time	Points
1	52	(West Germany) Anton Mang	Morbidelli	5	52:43.4	15
2	55	(West Germany) Walter Koschine	Maico	5	+1:39.9	12
3	42	(Belgium) Julien van Zeebroeck	Morbidelli	5	+1:44.7	10
4	49	(West Germany) Horst Seel	Eigenbau	5	+1:48.7	8
5	23	(Sweden) Lennart Lundgren	Yamaha	5	+2:28.2	6
6	41	(France) Jean-Louis Guignabodet	Morbidelli	5	+2:31.9	5
7	12	(Switzerland) Hans Müller	Yamaha	5	+2:37.6	4
8	8	(Austria) Harald Bartol	Morbidelli	5	+3:29.0	4
9	30	(Italy) Enrico Cereda	Morbidelli	5	+3:45.5	4
10	33	(Sweden) Hans Hallberg	Yamaha	5	+4:16.0	1
11	27	(Austria) Werner Schmied	Rotax	5	+4:17.7	
12	16	(Switzerland) Ernst Stammbach	Yamaha	5	+4:29.0	
13	31	(Finland) Pentti Salonen	Yamaha	5	+5:08.5	
14	56	(West Germany) Wolfgang Rubel	Maico	5	+5:17.5	
15	58	(West Germany) Rolf Minhoff	Maico	5	+5:51.9	
16	53	(West Germany) Bernhard Otto	Maico	5	+6:19.2	
17	46	(France) Benjamin Laurent	Morbidelli	5	+7:06.4	
18	63	(West Germany) Hans Knemeyer	Maico	5	+8:39.3	
19	67	(Czechoslovakia) Zbynek Havrda	Maico	4	+1 lap	
28 starters in total, 19 finishers

== 50 cc classification ==
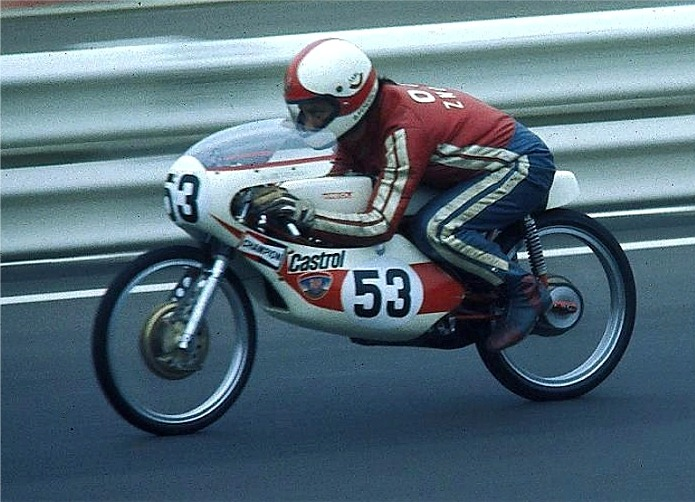
Czech rider Bedrich Fendrich.

Pos	No.	Rider	Manufacturer	Laps	Time	Points
1	1	(Spain) Ángel Nieto	Bultaco	3	31:42.4	15
2	5	(West Germany) Herbert Rittberger	Kreidler	3	+14.0	12
3	14	(Switzerland) Ulrich Graf	Kreidler	3	+51.3	10
4	9	(Austria) Hans Hummel	Kreidler	3	+1:31.7	8
5	34	(Switzerland) Rolf Blatter	Kreidler	3	+1:32.3	6
6	3	(Belgium) Julien van Zeebroeck	Kreidler	3	+1:32.9	5
7	48	(West Germany) Wolfgang Müller	Kreidler	3	+1:50.7	4
8	46	(West Germany) Bruno Stopp	Kreidler	3	+2:04.9	3
9	4	(West Germany) Rudolf Kunz	Kreidler	3	+2:14.6	2
10	27	(Italy) Ermanno Giuliano	LGM	3	+2:53.3	1
11	40	(West Germany) Günter Schirnhofer	Kreidler	3	+3:05.0	
12	36	(West Germany) Wolfgang Golembeck	Kreidler	3	+3:05.2	
13	44	(West Germany) Hagen Klein	Kreidler	3	+3:32.0	
14	35	(France) Benjamin Laurent	Kreidler	3	+3:35.8	
15	13	(Italy) Aldo Pero	Kreidler	3	+3:36.2	
16	25	(France) Jacques Hutteau	Morbidelli	3	+3:55.6	
17	43	(West Germany) Waller Däuwel	Kreidler	3	+3:57.7	
18	51	(West Germany) Roland Schuster	Kreidler	3	+3:58.0	
19	11	(Netherlands) Theo Timmer	Kreidler	3	+3:58.3	
20	23	(Netherlands) Engelbert Kip	Kreidler	3	+4:21.8	
42 starters in total, 30 finishers

== Sidecar classification ==
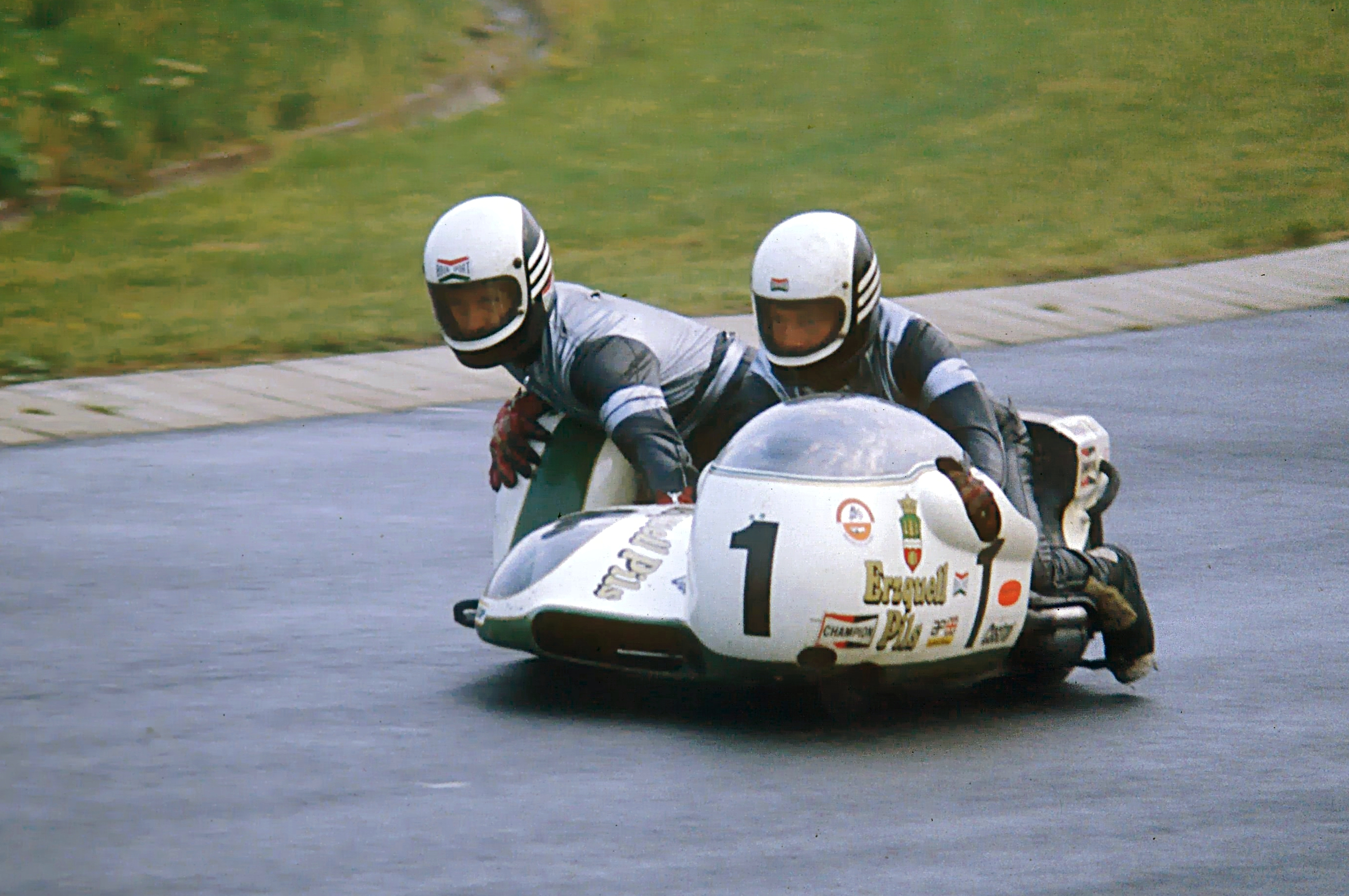
Rolf Steinhausen and Sepp Huber.

Pos	No.	Rider	Passenger	Manufacturer	Laps	Time	Points
1	2	(West Germany) Werner Schwärzel	(West Germany) Andreas Huber	König	5	55:53.3	15
2	1	(West Germany) Rolf Steinhausen	(West Germany) Sepp Huber	Busch-König	5	+1:54.8	12
3	12	(United Kingdom) George O'Dell	(United Kingdom) Kenny Arthur	Yamaha	5	+2:26.7	10
4	3	(Switzerland) Rolf Biland	(United Kingdom) Ken Williams	Yamaha	5	+2:58.3	8
5	20	(Switzerland) Bruno Holzer	(Switzerland) Charly Meierhans	Yamaha	5	+3:28.7	6
6	36	(West Germany) Hermann Huber	(West Germany) Hans Seib	König	5	+3:34.7	5
7	21	(Switzerland) Ernst Trachsel	(Switzerland) Benedikt Stahli	Yamaha	5	+3:53.6	4
8	34	(West Germany) Walter Ohrmann	(West Germany) Bernd Grube	Yamaha	5	+3:58.4	3
9	30	(West Germany) Siegfried Schauzu	(West Germany) Wolfgang Kalauch	Aro	5	+4:58.2	2
10	43	(West Germany) Kurt Jelonek	(West Germany) Volker Riess	König	5	+5:00.5	1
11	31	(West Germany) Max Venus	(West Germany) Norbert Bittermann	König	5	+5:00.9	
12	18	(United Kingdom) Tony Wakefield	(United Kingdom) Keith Brown	British Magnum	5	+5:03.1	
13	14	(West Germany) Heinz Luthringhauser	(West Germany) Lorenzo Puzo	BMW	5	+5:04.6	
14	40	(West Germany) Rudolf Reinhard	(West Germany) Karin Sterzenbach	Yamaha	5	+5:11.8	
15	7	(Switzerland) Hermann Schmid	(Switzerland) Jean-Pierre Martial	Yamaha	5	+5:31.5	
40 starters in total, 27 finishers

Previous race: 1976 Czechoslovak Grand Prix	FIM Grand Prix World Championship; 1976 season	Next race: 1976 Spanish Grand Prix
Previous race: 1975 German Grand Prix	German Grand Prix	Next race: 1977 German Grand Prix
