= Chas Mortimer =

British motorcycle racer (born 1949)

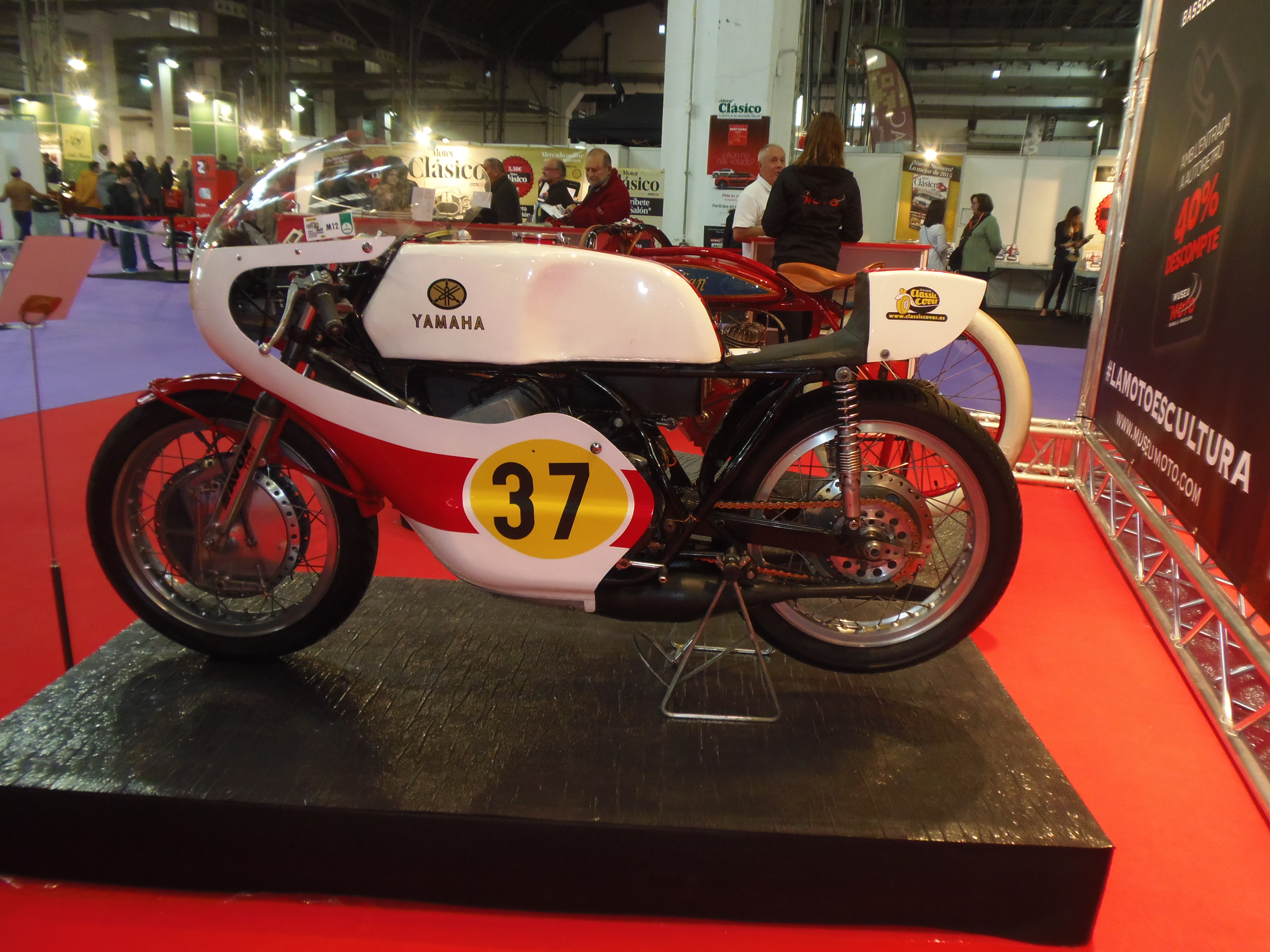
- Nationality: British
Motorcycle racing career statistics
Grand Prix motorcycle racing
Active years	1969 - 1979, 1984
First race	1969 Isle of Man TT 125cc Lightweight TT
Last race	1984 250cc South African Grand Prix
First win	1971 Isle of Man TT 125cc Lightweight TT
Last win	1976 Isle of Man TT 350cc Junior TT
Team	Yamaha
Championships	0
Starts / Wins / Podiums / Poles / F. laps / Points; 107 / 7 / 39 / 3 / 5 / 730

Charles Summers Mortimer (born 14 April 1949) is an English former professional motorcycle short-circuit road racer and race-school instructor. He competed in the Grand Prix motorcycle road racing world championships from 1969 to 1979. He remains the only competitor to have won FIM Grand Prix races in the 125, 250, 350, 500 and 750 world championship classes.

== Motorcycle racing career ==
Born in Shere, Surrey, UK, Mortimer is the son of Charles Mortimer Senior, a former motorcycle road racer and proprietor of the Charles Mortimer Race School based at Brands Hatch race circuit, Kent. The school was originally named in 1963 as the Beart-Mortimer racing school, with engine tuner Francis Beart being a partner to Mortimer Senior which ended in 1965 due to Beart's other business involvements. From 1966, the venues included Cadwell Park, Silverstone and Mallory Park.

Mortimer began racing in 1965 on a Greeves Silverstone as used by the race school. At 18 years of age in 1967, Mortimer was one of the school's instructors, with Paul Smart being another. Both were competitive riders sponsored by Charles Senior, riding from a stable of machines consisting of RDS Greeves 250s, a Bultaco 125 and an Aermacchi 350. He competed for most of his career as a privateer riding Yamaha motorcycles. When Mortimer won the 1972 500cc Spanish Grand Prix on a Yamaha, it marked the first 500cc Grand Prix victory for the Japanese manufacturer. He had his best Grand Prix season in 1973 when he finished second to Kent Andersson in the 125cc world championship. In the 1974 season, Mortimer held a comfortable lead on 15-time World Champion Giacomo Agostini during the 350cc Austrian Grand Prix at the Salzburgring, when he slowed his pace to allow Agostini to claim the victory because he was unsure whether the Yamaha factory would withhold their support if he defeated their top rider. Mortimer also competed successfully at the Isle of Man TT, with eight victories at the event. In 1976, he won the Macau Grand Prix.

In the 1970s, Mortimer operated a race school and ran a business in Reading, Berkshire importing motorcycle parts . As of 2013, he is running a transportation company specialising in transportation of motorcycles. His brother Robin Mortimer had a long career in motor sport. When he died in 2007, he was manager of RPM Motorsport with his son Alex as driver in GT class.

== Grand Prix motorcycle racing results ==
**Position**	1	2	3	4	5	6	7	8	9	10
**Points**	15	12	10	8	6	5	4	3	2	1

(key) (Races in bold indicate pole position; races in italics indicate fastest lap)

Year	Class	Team	1	2	3	4	5	6	7	8	9	10	11	12	13	Points	Rank	Wins
1969	125cc	Villa	ESP -	GER -	FRA -	IOM; NC	NED -	BEL -	DDR -	CZE -	FIN; 6		NAT -	YUG -		5	32nd	0
1969	250cc	Yamaha	ESP -	GER -	FRA -	IOM; NC	NED -	BEL -	DDR -	CZE -	FIN; 9	ULS; 5	NAT -	YUG -		8	22nd	0
1970	125cc	Villa	GER -	FRA -	YUG -	IOM; NC	NED -	BEL; 6	DDR -	CZE -	FIN -		NAT -	ESP -		5	31st	0
1970	250cc	Yamaha	GER; 3	FRA -	YUG; 7	IOM; 4	NED -	BEL; 8	DDR -	CZE; 6	FIN -	ULS -	NAT -	ESP -		30	6th	0
1970	350cc	Yamaha	GER; 3		YUG; 8	IOM; NC	NED -		DDR -	CZE; 10	FIN; 10	ULS -	NAT -	ESP -		15	15th	0
1971	125cc	Yamaha	AUT -	GER; 7	IOM; 1	NED; 5	BEL; 5	DDR -	CZE; 7	SWE -	FIN; 6		NAT -	ESP; 2		48	5th	1
1971	250cc	Yamaha	AUT -	GER -	IOM; NC	NED; 5	BEL; 5	DDR; 7	CZE; 4	SWE -	FIN; 4	ULS -	NAT -	ESP; 3		42	8th	0
1972	125cc	Yamaha	GER; 2	FRA; 2	AUT -	NAT; 2	IOM; 1	YUG; 2	NED -	BEL; 2	DDR; 2	CZE; 2	SWE; 3	FIN -	ESP; 2	87	3rd	1
1972	250cc	Yamaha	GER; 7	FRA -	AUT; 5	NAT -	IOM; 14	YUG -	NED -	BEL -	DDR -	CZE -	SWE -	FIN -	ESP; 4	18	14th	0
1972	350cc	Yamaha	GER -	FRA -	AUT -	NAT -	IOM; NC	YUG -	NED -		DDR -	CZE -	SWE -	FIN -	ESP -	0	-	0
1972	500cc	Yamaha	GER -	FRA -	AUT -	NAT -	IOM -	YUG; 2	NED; 5	BEL -	DDR; 5	CZE -	SWE; 8	FIN -	ESP; 1	42	6th	1
1973	125cc	Yamaha	FRA -	AUT -	GER -	NAT -	IOM -	YUG; 2	NED; 3	BEL; 3	CZE; 2	SWE; 3	FIN; 5	ESP; 1		75	2nd	1
1973	250cc	Yamaha	FRA; 7	AUT; 3	GER -		IOM -	YUG; 5	NED; 5	BEL; 7	CZE -	SWE; 10	FIN -	ESP; 3		40	6th	0
1973	500cc	Yamaha	FRA -	AUT -	GER -		IOM -	YUG -	NED -	BEL -	CZE -	SWE -	FIN -	ESP; 4		8	24th	0
1974	250cc	Yamaha		GER -		NAT -	IOM; 3	NED; 6	BEL -	SWE; 4	FIN -	CZE; 8	YUG; 1	ESP -		41	6th	1
1974	350cc	Yamaha	FRA -	GER -	AUT; 2	NAT; 5	IOM; NC	NED -		SWE; 6	FIN -		YUG -	ESP; 5		29	5th	0
1974	500cc	Yamaha	FRA; 8	GER -	AUT -	NAT -	IOM; NC	NED -	BEL -	SWE -	FIN -	CZE; 10				4	28th	0
1975	250cc	Yamaha	FRA; 7	ESP; 4		GER -	NAT -	**IOM**; 1	NED -	BEL; 7	SWE; 10	FIN -	CZE; 8	YUG; 2		46	6th	1
1975	350cc	Yamaha	FRA -	ESP -	AUT -	GER; 7	NAT; 8	IOM; 2	NED; 9			FIN -	CZE -	YUG; 3		31	6th	0
1975	500cc	Yamaha	FRA -		AUT -	GER -	NAT -	IOM; 3	NED -	BEL -	SWE -	FIN; 4	CZE; 6			23	11th	0
1976	250cc	Yamaha	FRA; 12		NAT; 4	YUG; 5	IOM; 3	NED -	BEL -	SWE; 5	FIN -	CZE -	GER; 10	ESP; 12		31	7th	0
1976	350cc	Yamaha	FRA -	AUT; 8	NAT -	YUG; 2	IOM; 1	NED; 3			FIN; 4	CZE; 4	GER -	ESP; Ret		54	3rd	1
1976	500cc	Yamaha	FRA; 13	AUT -	NAT -		IOM; NC	NED -	BEL; 7	SWE; 3	FIN -	CZE; 9	GER; 9			16	14th	0
1977	250cc	Yamaha	VEN -	GER -	NAT -	ESP -	FRA -	YUG -	NED -	BEL; 13	SWE; 6	FIN; 15	CZE -	GBR -		5	27th	0
1977	350cc	Yamaha	VEN -	GER -	NAT; 10	ESP; 14	FRA -	YUG -	NED; 12		SWE -	FIN; 12	CZE -	GBR -		1	36th	0
1978	250cc	Yamaha	VEN -	ESP; 10	FRA; 7	NAT -	NED -	BEL -	SWE; 8	FIN -	GBR -	GER; 7	CZE -	YUG -		12	18th	0
1979	250cc	Yamaha	VEN; 9	GER -	NAT -	ESP -	YUG -	NED -	**BEL**; 2	SWE -	FIN -	GBR -	CZE -	FRA -		14	13th	0
1984	250cc	Yamaha	RSA; 23	NAT -	ESP -	AUT -	GER -	FRA -	YUG -	NED -	BEL -	GBR -	SWE -	RSM -		0	-	0

Sporting positions
Preceded by Hideo Kanaya	Macau Motorcycle Grand Prix Winner; 1976	Succeeded by Mick Grant
