= Harley-Davidson RR250 =

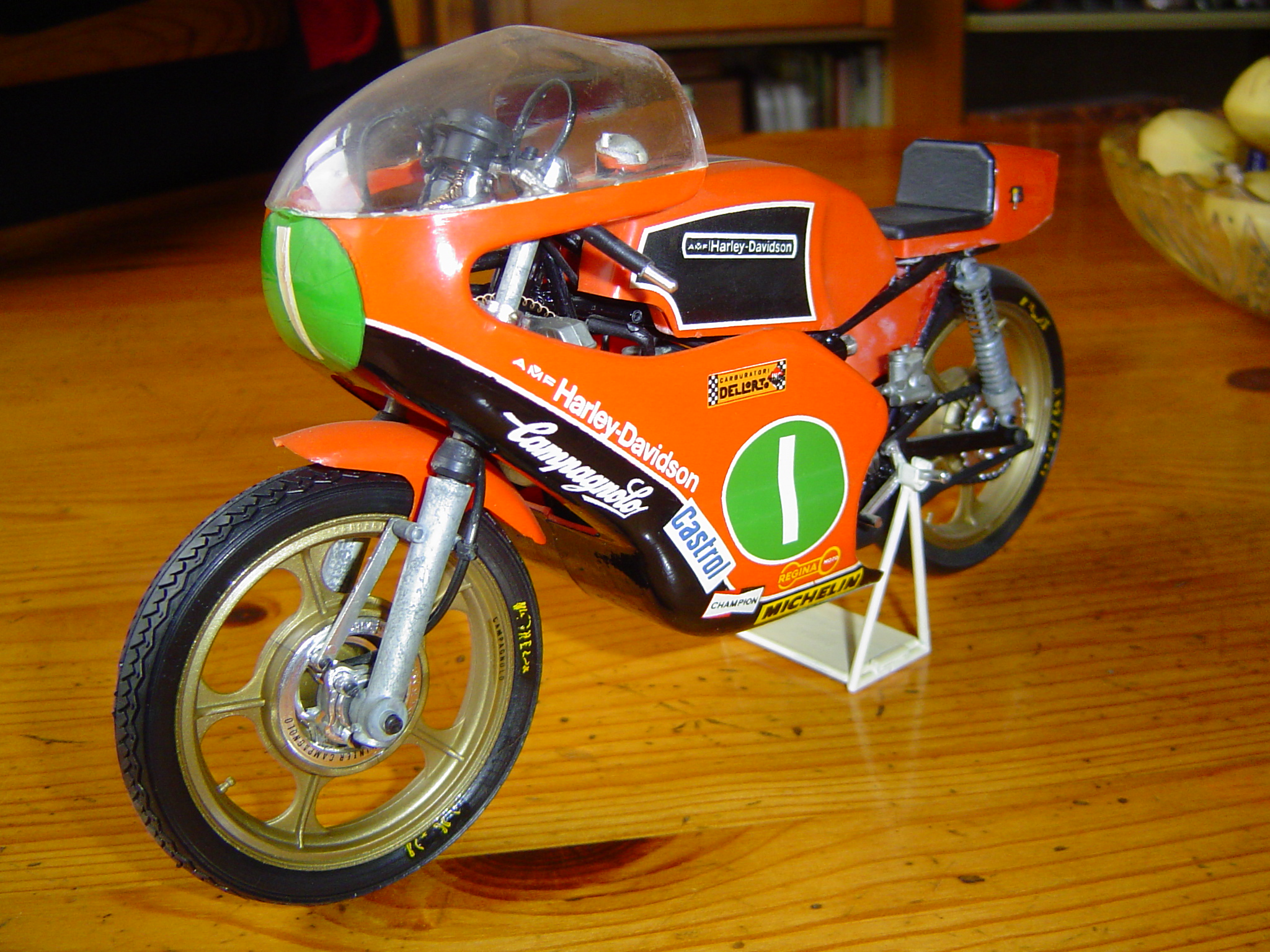
- Manufacturer: Harley-Davidson
- Production: 1972–1977
- Engine: 246 cc (15.0 cu in) two-stroke air-cooled (later water-cooled) parallel twin engine
- Bore / stroke: 56 mm × 50 mm (2.2 in × 2.0 in)
- Compression ratio: 12.0:1
- Power: 49 hp (37 kW) @ 11,400 rpm (1972); 58 hp (43 kW) @ 12,000 rpm (1976)
- Torque: 22.6 lb⋅ft (30.6 N⋅m)
- Transmission: 6-speed, Chain
- Frame type: Steel tube frame
- Suspension: 34mm Ceriani telescopic forks, twin Girling rear
- Brakes: Drum brakes: 230mm Ceriani 4-leading shoe (front), 230mm Ceriani twin leading shoe (rear)
- Wheelbase: 1,250 mm (49 in)
- Weight: 108–112 kg (238–247 lb) (dry)
- Fuel capacity: 19 L (4.2 imp gal; 5.0 US gal)

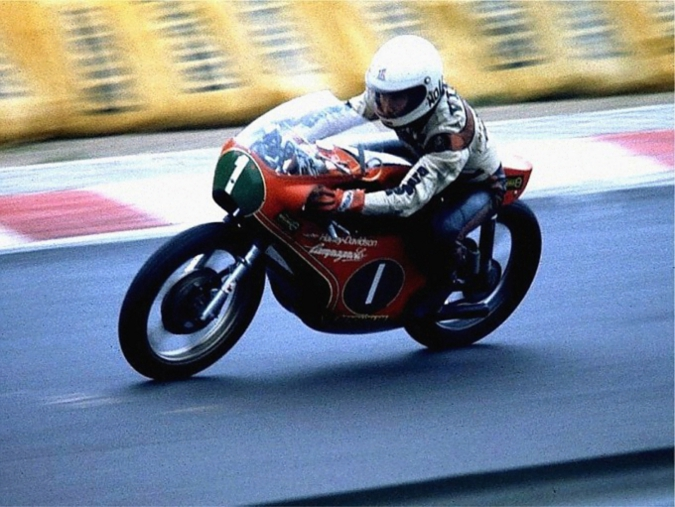
Walter Villa's Harley-Davidson RR250

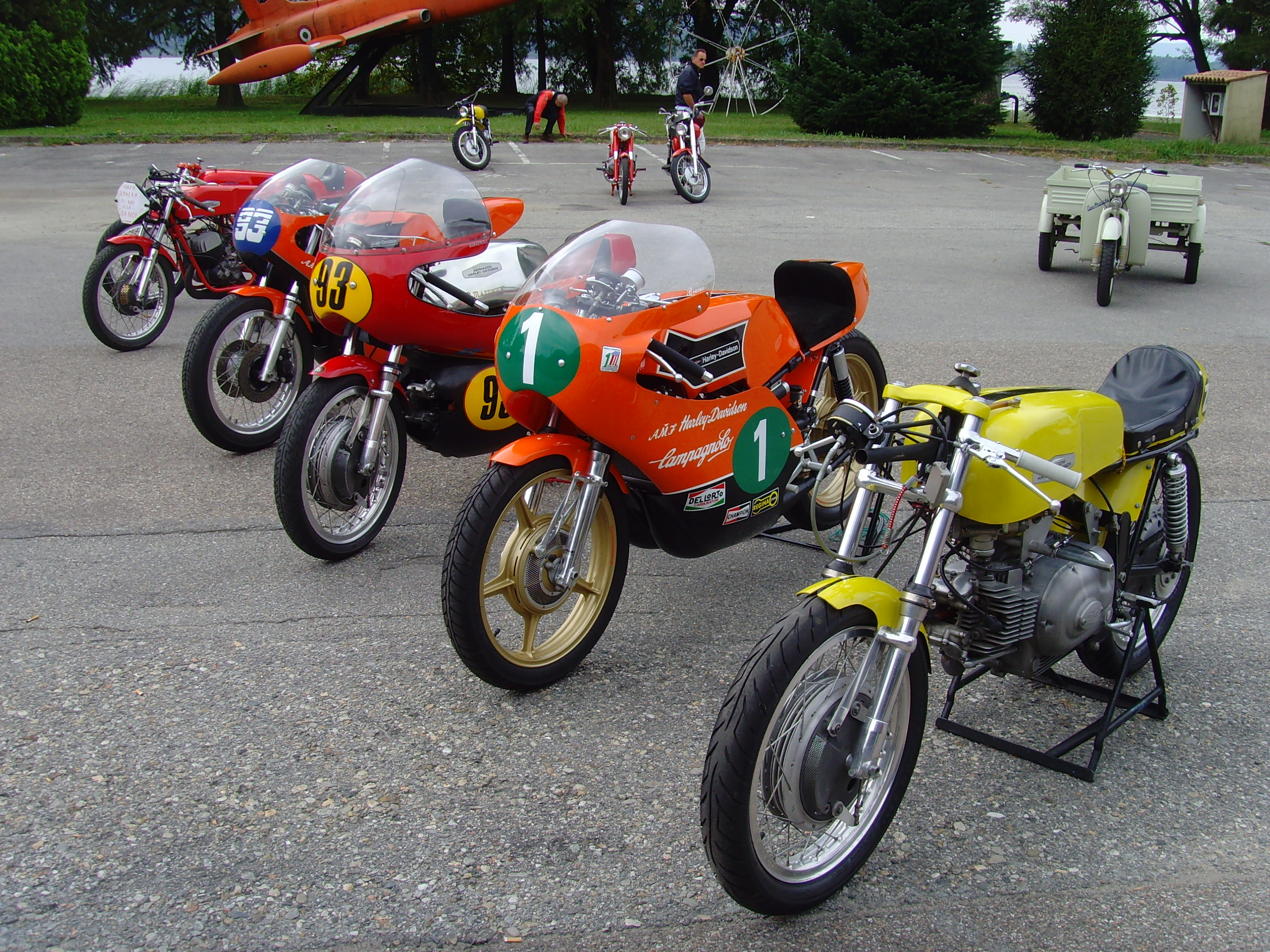
Harley-Davidson RR GP motorcycles

The Harley-Davidson RR250, also known as the Harley-Davidson 250RR, was a racing motorcycle, designed, developed and built by the Harley-Davidson-owned Aermacchi motorcycle company at its Varese factory in northern Italy. The motorcycle conformed to the 250cc class regulations of the Grand Prix motorcycle racing world championship, between 1972 and 1977.
