= Yugoslavian motorcycle Grand Prix =

Coordinates: 45°22′57″N 14°30′31″E

Yugoslavian Grand Prix
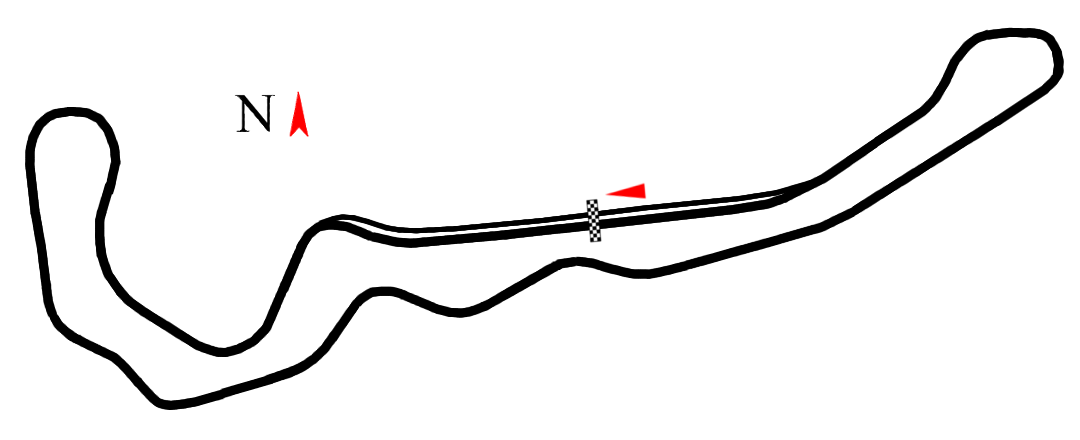

Grand Prix motorcycle racing
- Venue: Automotodrom Grobnik (1978–1990); Opatija Circuit (1969–1970, 1972–1977)
- First race: 1969
- Last race: 1990
- Most wins (rider): Dieter Braun (6)
- Most wins (manufacturer): Yamaha (20)

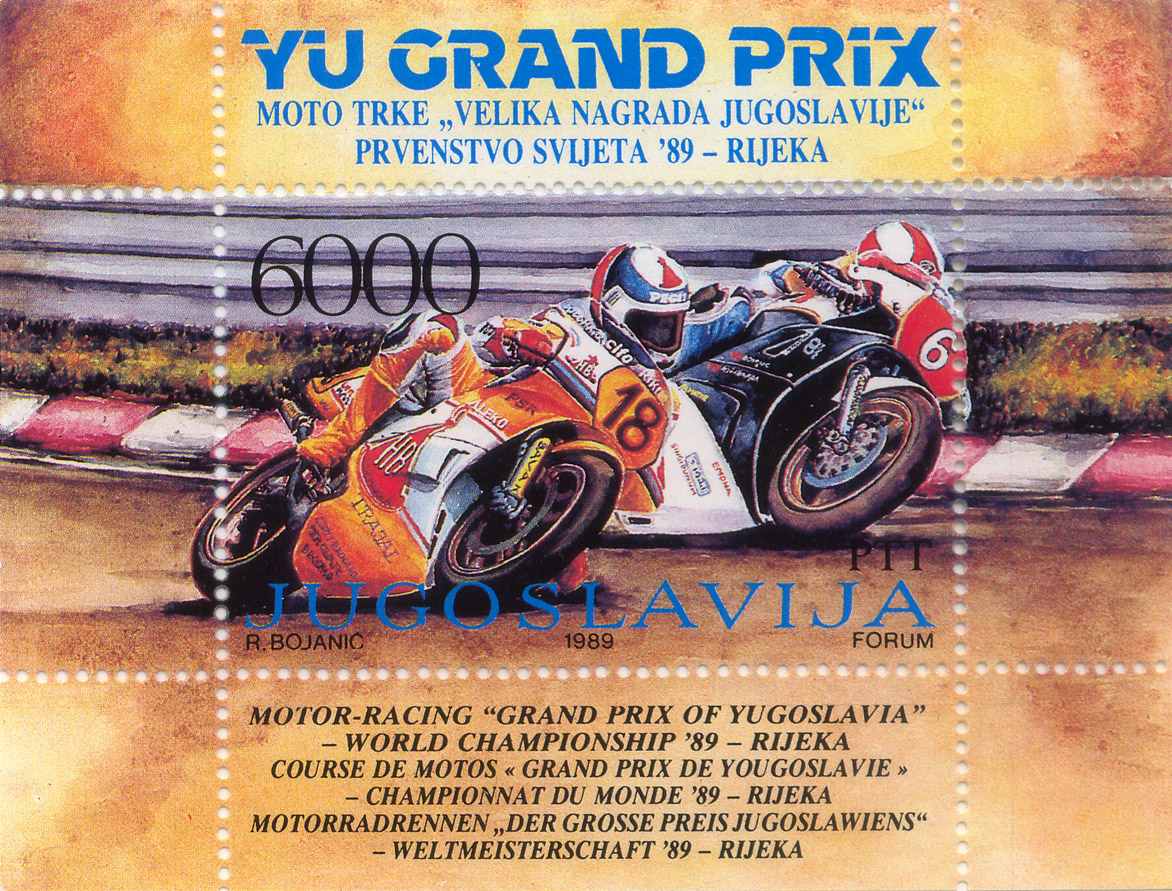
1989 race on a Yugoslav stamp

The Yugoslavian motorcycle Grand Prix was a motorcycling event forming part of the Grand Prix motorcycle racing season from 1969 to 1990.

== Official names and sponsors ==
- 1969–1970: Velika nagrada Jadrana/Adriatic Grand Prix/Grand-Prix de l'Adriatique
- 1972–1974, 1977: Velika Nagrada Jugoslavije/Grand Prix de Yougoslavie (no official sponsor)
- 1975–1976, 1978–1980: Velika Nagrada Jugoslavije (no official sponsor)
- 1981, 1983–1989: Yu Grand Prix (no official sponsor)
- 1982: Yu Grand (no official sponsor)
- 1990: Yu Grand Prix/Velika Nagrada Jugoslavije (no official sponsor)

== Winners ==
=== Multiple winners (riders) ===
# Wins	Rider	Wins	
# Wins	Rider	Category	Years won
6	(West Germany) Dieter Braun	250cc	1973, 1975, 1976
6	(West Germany) Dieter Braun	125cc	1969, 1970, 1975
5	(Spain) Ángel Nieto	125cc	1978, 1979
5	(Spain) Ángel Nieto	50cc	1970, 1975, 1977
4	(Spain) Jorge Martínez	125cc	1988
4	(Spain) Jorge Martínez	50cc	1986, 1987, 1988
3	(Italy) Giacomo Agostini	500cc	1970
3	(Italy) Giacomo Agostini	350cc	1970, 1974
3	(Sweden) Kent Andersson	125cc	1972, 1973, 1974
3	(Spain) Ricardo Tormo	50cc	1978, 1980, 1981
3	(Italy) Eugenio Lazzarini	125cc	1982
3	(Italy) Eugenio Lazzarini	50cc	1979, 1982
3	(United States) Freddie Spencer	500cc	1983, 1984
3	(United States) Freddie Spencer	250cc	1985
3	(Switzerland) Stefan Dörflinger	80cc	1984, 1985
3	(Switzerland) Stefan Dörflinger	50cc	1983
3	(Spain) Sito Pons	250cc	1986, 1988, 1989
2	(Hungary) János Drapál	350cc	1972, 1973
2	(Italy) Pier Paolo Bianchi	125cc	1976, 1977
2	(Australia) Gregg Hansford	350cc	1978
2	(Australia) Gregg Hansford	250cc	1978
2	(West Germany) Anton Mang	350cc	1981
2	(West Germany) Anton Mang	250cc	1980
2	(United States) Eddie Lawson	500cc	1985, 1986
2	(Venezuela) Carlos Lavado	250cc	1983, 1987
2	(Australia) Wayne Gardner	500cc	1987, 1988

=== Multiple winners (manufacturers) ===
# Wins	Manufacturer	Wins	
# Wins	Manufacturer	Category	Years won
20	(Japan) Yamaha	500cc	1979, 1985, 1986, 1990
20	(Japan) Yamaha	350cc	1972, 1973, 1974, 1975, 1976, 1977
20	(Japan) Yamaha	250cc	1973, 1974, 1975, 1976, 1982, 1983, 1987
20	(Japan) Yamaha	125cc	1972, 1973, 1974
10	(Japan) Honda	500cc	1983, 1984, 1987, 1988,
10	(Japan) Honda	250cc	1985, 1986, 1988, 1989, 1990
10	(Japan) Honda	125cc	1990
6	(West Germany) Kreidler	50cc	1972, 1973, 1975, 1976, 1979, 1980
6	(Italy) Morbidelli	250cc	1977, 1979
6	(Italy) Morbidelli	125cc	1975, 1976, 1977, 1983
5	(Japan) Kawasaki	350cc	1978, 1979, 1981
5	(Japan) Kawasaki	250cc	1978, 1980
5	(Spain) Derbi	125cc	1988
5	(Spain) Derbi	80cc	1986, 1987, 1988
5	(Spain) Derbi	50cc	1970
5	(Japan) Suzuki	500cc	1981, 1982, 1989
5	(Japan) Suzuki	125cc	1969, 1970
3	(Italy) MV Agusta	500cc	1970, 1972
3	(Italy) MV Agusta	350cc	1970
3	(Spain) Bultaco	50cc	1977, 1978, 1981
3	(Italy) Minarelli	125cc	1978, 1979, 1981
3	(Switzerland) Krauser	80cc	1985, 1989
3	(Switzerland) Krauser	50cc	1983
2	(Italy) Garelli	125cc	1982
2	(Italy) Garelli	50cc	1982

=== By year ===
Year	Track	80cc		125cc		250cc		500cc		Report
Year	Track	Rider	Manufacturer	Rider	Manufacturer	Rider	Manufacturer	Rider	Manufacturer	Report
1990	Rijeka			(West Germany) Stefan Prein	Honda	(Spain) Carlos Cardús	Honda	(United States) Wayne Rainey	Yamaha	Report
1989	Rijeka	(West Germany) Peter Öttl	Krauser			(Spain) Sito Pons	Honda	(United States) Kevin Schwantz	Suzuki	Report
1988	Rijeka	(Spain) Jorge Martínez	Derbi	(Spain) Jorge Martínez	Derbi	(Spain) Sito Pons	Honda	(Australia) Wayne Gardner	Honda	Report
1987	Rijeka	(Spain) Jorge Martínez	Derbi			(Venezuela) Carlos Lavado	Yamaha	(Australia) Wayne Gardner	Honda	Report
1986	Rijeka	(Spain) Jorge Martínez	Derbi			(Spain) Sito Pons	Honda	(United States) Eddie Lawson	Yamaha	Report
1985	Rijeka	(Switzerland) Stefan Dörflinger	Krauser			(United States) Freddie Spencer	Honda	(United States) Eddie Lawson	Yamaha	Report
1984	Rijeka	(Switzerland) Stefan Dörflinger	Zündapp			(West Germany) Manfred Herweh	Real-Rotax	(United States) Freddie Spencer	Honda	Report

Year	Track	50cc		125cc		250cc		350cc		500cc		Report
Year	Track	Rider	Manufacturer	Rider	Manufacturer	Rider	Manufacturer	Rider	Manufacturer	Rider	Manufacturer	Report
1983	Rijeka	(Switzerland) Stefan Dörflinger	Krauser	(Switzerland) Bruno Kneubühler	MBA	(Venezuela) Carlos Lavado	Yamaha			(United States) Freddie Spencer	Honda	Report
1982	Rijeka	(Italy) Eugenio Lazzarini	Garelli	(Italy) Eugenio Lazzarini	Garelli	(Belgium) Didier de Radiguès	Yamaha			(Italy) Franco Uncini	Suzuki	Report
1981	Rijeka	(Spain) Ricardo Tormo	Bultaco	(Italy) Loris Reggiani	Minarelli			(West Germany) Anton Mang	Kawasaki	(United States) Randy Mamola	Suzuki	Report
1980	Rijeka	(Spain) Ricardo Tormo	Kreidler	(France) Guy Bertin	Motobécane	(West Germany) Anton Mang	Kawasaki					Report
1979	Rijeka	(Italy) Eugenio Lazzarini	Kreidler	(Spain) Ángel Nieto	Minarelli	(Italy) Graziano Rossi	Morbidelli	(South Africa) Kork Ballington	Kawasaki	(United States) Kenny Roberts	Yamaha	Report
1978	Rijeka	(Spain) Ricardo Tormo	Bultaco	(Spain) Ángel Nieto	Minarelli	(Australia) Gregg Hansford	Kawasaki	(Australia) Gregg Hansford	Kawasaki			Report
1977	Opatija	(Spain) Ángel Nieto	Bultaco	(Italy) Pier Paolo Bianchi	Morbidelli	(Italy) Mario Lega	Morbidelli	(Japan) Takazumi Katayama	Yamaha			Report
1976	Opatija	(Switzerland) Ulrich Graf	Kreidler	(Italy) Pier Paolo Bianchi	Morbidelli	(West Germany) Dieter Braun	Yamaha	(France) Olivier Chevallier	Yamaha			Report
1975	Opatija	(Spain) Ángel Nieto	Kreidler	(West Germany) Dieter Braun	Morbidelli	(West Germany) Dieter Braun	Yamaha	(Finland) Pentti Korhonen	Yamaha			Report
1974	Opatija	(Netherlands) Henk van Kessel	Van Veen Kreidler	(Sweden) Kent Andersson	Yamaha	(United Kingdom) Chas Mortimer	Yamaha	(Italy) Giacomo Agostini	Yamaha			Report
1973	Opatija	(Netherlands) Jan de Vries	Kreidler	(Sweden) Kent Andersson	Yamaha	(West Germany) Dieter Braun	Yamaha	(Hungary) János Drapál	Yamaha	(New Zealand) Kim Newcombe	König	Report
1972	Opatija	(Netherlands) Jan Bruins	Kreidler	(Sweden) Kent Andersson	Yamaha	(Italy) Renzo Pasolini	Aermacchi	(Hungary) János Drapál	Yamaha	(Italy) Alberto Pagani	MV Agusta	Report
1970	Opatija	(Spain) Ángel Nieto	Derbi	(West Germany) Dieter Braun	Suzuki	(Spain) Santiago Herrero	Ossa	(Italy) Giacomo Agostini	MV Agusta	(Italy) Giacomo Agostini	MV Agusta	Report
1969	Opatija	(Netherlands) Paul Lodewijkx	Jamathi	(West Germany) Dieter Braun	Suzuki	(Australia) Kelvin Carruthers	Benelli	(Italy) Silvio Grassetti	Jawa	(United Kingdom) Godfrey Nash	Norton	Report
