= Imatra Circuit =

Defunct Finnish motorsport race track

Jarno Saarinen Imatra Circuit
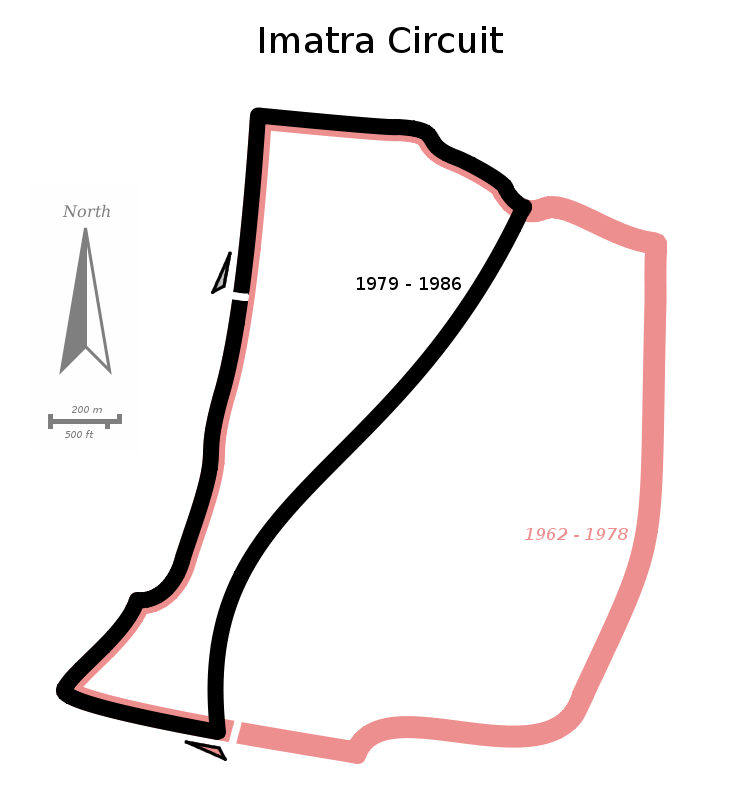
- The layouts of the Imatra Circuit
- Location: Imatra, Finland
- Coordinates: 61°10′40.2″N 28°47′28.5″E
- Opened: 1962; Re-opened: 19 August 2016; 10 years ago
- Closed: 3 August 1986; 40 years ago
- Former names: Imatra Circuit (1962–1986, 2016–2021)
- Major events: Current: Imatranajo (1962–1986, 2016–2019, 2022–present); Former: Grand Prix motorcycle racing Finnish motorcycle Grand Prix (1964–1982); Sidecar World Championship (1967–1973, 1980–1982); Formula TT (1986)

Imatranajo Circuit (1979–1986, 2016–present)
- Length: 4.950 km (3.076 mi)
- Turns: 11
- Race lap record: 1:48.743 ( (Finland) Erno Kostamo, BMW M1000RR, 2025, SBK)

Grand Prix Circuit (1962–1978)
- Length: 6.030 km (3.747 mi)
- Turns: 14
- Race lap record: 2:05.900 ( (Venezuela) Johnny Cecotto, Yamaha YZR500, 1977, 500cc)

The Jarno Saarinen Imatra Circuit is a motorsport street circuit in Imatra, Finland. Since 2022 the circuit name was additionally given Jarno Saarinen's name as a memorial homage to the 50th Anniversary of his World Championship. The circuit has existed in two versions, and has been exclusively used for the "Imatranajo" motorcycle road race. From 1962 to 1978 a 6.030 km (3.747 mi) clockwise street circuit in the east of the town of Imatra was used. The circuit ran along the Vuoksi river and a railway line that had to be crossed. From 1979 to 1986 a shorter circuit was used. This was only 4.950 km (3.076 mi) long and consisted mostly of the western part of the original circuit.

From the 1964 season until the 1982 season the Grand Prix of Finland was run 19 times in Imatra. From the 1983 season the "Imatranajo" lost its World Championship status due to the dangerous nature of the circuit and the death of sidecar driver Jock Taylor in 1982.

The last road race on the Imatra Circuit for many years was held in 1986 when a six-year-old boy died after falling under a running wheel, but classic races still took place. Road racing returned to Imatra in August 2016 with a round of the International Road Racing Championship, and another round was held in 2017. In the "Imatranajo" on June 15, 2019, a fatal crash occurred when a Swiss rider Mathias Gnägi with a Superbike dropped off the track in the rain and was killed. Another fatal accident occurred on the 2nd of July 2023, when former IRRC Supersport Champion Joey den Besten from the Netherlands, came off the track in a IRRC Superbike Round in the wet on a warm-up lap and struck a lighting pole.

== Lap records ==
As of July 2025, the fastest official race lap records at the Jarno Saarinen Imatra Circuit are listed as:

Category	Time	Driver	Vehicle	Event
Imatranajo Circuit (1979–1986, 2016–present): 4.950 km (3.076 mi)
Superbike	1:48.743	Erno Kostamo	BMW M1000RR	2025 Imatra IRRC SBK round
Supersport	1:53.429	Richard Cooper	Yamaha YZF-R6	2025 Imatra IRRC SSP round
500cc	1:54.000	Marco Lucchinelli	Suzuki RG 500 gamma	1981 Finnish motorcycle Grand Prix
250cc	2:10.300	Gregg Hansford	Kawasaki KR250	1979 Finnish motorcycle Grand Prix
125cc	2:26.800	Ricardo Tormo	Bultaco 125	1979 Finnish motorcycle Grand Prix
Grand Prix Circuit (1962–1978): 6.030 km (3.747 mi)
500cc	2:05.900	Johnny Cecotto	Yamaha YZR500	1977 Finnish motorcycle Grand Prix
350cc	2:13.800	Takazumi Katayama	Yamaha TZ 350	1978 Finnish motorcycle Grand Prix
250cc	2:16.600	Walter Villa	Harley-Davidson RR250	1977 Finnish motorcycle Grand Prix
125cc	2:23.500	Pier Paolo Bianchi	Morbidelli 125	1977 Finnish motorcycle Grand Prix
50cc	2:59.900	Julien Vanzeebroeck	Kreidler 50 GP	1976 Finnish motorcycle Grand Prix

== Finnish Grand Prix results ==
=== From 1964 to 1972 ===
Year	Class	1st	2nd	3rd	Fastest Lap
1964	50 cc	(New Zealand) Hugh Anderson (Suzuki)	(West Germany) Hans-Georg Anscheidt (Kreidler)	(Switzerland) Luigi Taveri (Kreidler)	(New Zealand) Hugh Anderson (Suzuki)
1964	125 cc	(Switzerland) Luigi Taveri (Honda)	(Northern Ireland) Ralph Bryans (Honda)	(Federation of Rhodesia and Nyasaland) Jim Redman (Honda)	(Federation of Rhodesia and Nyasaland) Jim Redman (Honda)
1964	350 cc	(Federation of Rhodesia and Nyasaland) Jim Redman (Honda)	(Federation of Rhodesia and Nyasaland) Bruce Beale (Honda)	(Soviet Union) Endel Kiisa (CKEB)	(Federation of Rhodesia and Nyasaland) Jim Redman (Honda)
1964	500 cc	(Australia) Jack Ahearn (Norton)	(Canada) Mike Duff (Matchless)	(Switzerland) Gyula Marsovszky (Matchless)	(Canada) Mike Duff (Matchless)
1965	125 cc	(New Zealand) Hugh Anderson (Suzuki)	(Canada) Frank Perris (Suzuki)	(East Germany) Jochen Leitert (MZ)	(New Zealand) Hugh Anderson (Suzuki)
1965	250 cc	(Canada) Mike Duff (Yamaha)	(East Germany) Heinz Rosner (MZ)	(Northern Ireland) Ralph Bryans (Honda)	(Canada) Mike Duff (Yamaha)
1965	350 cc	(Italy) Giacomo Agostini (MV Agusta)	(Federation of Rhodesia and Nyasaland) Bruce Beale (Honda)	(Czechoslovakia) František Boček (Jawa)	(Italy) Giacomo Agostini (MV Agusta)
1965	500 cc	(Italy) Giacomo Agostini (MV Agusta)	(South Africa) Paddy Driver (Matchless)	(United Kingdom) Fred Stevens (Matchless)	(Italy) Giacomo Agostini (MV Agusta)
1966	125 cc	(United Kingdom) Phil Read (Yamaha)	(Switzerland) Luigi Taveri (Honda)	(Northern Ireland) Ralph Bryans (Honda)	(Switzerland) Luigi Taveri (Honda)
1966	250 cc	(United Kingdom) Mike Hailwood (Honda)	(United Kingdom) Stuart Graham (Honda)	(Czechoslovakia) František Šťastný (Jawa)	(United Kingdom) Mike Hailwood (Honda)
1966	350 cc	(United Kingdom) Mike Hailwood (Honda)	(East Germany) Heinz Rosner (MZ)	(Australia) Jack Ahearn (Norton)	(United Kingdom) Mike Hailwood (Honda)
1966	500 cc	(Italy) Giacomo Agostini (MV Agusta)	(United Kingdom) Mike Hailwood (Honda)	(Australia) Jack Findlay (McIntyre-Matchless)	(Italy) Giacomo Agostini (MV Agusta)
1967	125 cc	(United Kingdom) Stuart Graham (Suzuki)	(United Kingdom) Bill Ivy (Yamaha)	(United Kingdom) Dave Simmonds (Kawasaki)	(United Kingdom) Bill Ivy (Yamaha)
1967	250 cc	(United Kingdom) Mike Hailwood (Honda)	(United Kingdom) Bill Ivy (Yamaha)	(United Kingdom) Derek Woodman (MZ)	(United Kingdom) Mike Hailwood (Honda)
1967	500 cc	(Italy) Giacomo Agostini (MV Agusta)	(United Kingdom) John Hartle (Métisse-Matchless)	(United Kingdom) Billie Nelson (Norton)	(Italy) Giacomo Agostini (MV Agusta)
1967	Sidecars	(West Germany) Klaus Enders/ (West Germany) Ralf Engelhardt (BMW)	(West Germany) Johann Attenberger/ (West Germany) Josef Schillinger (BMW)	(West Germany) Georg Auerbacher/ (West Germany) Eduard Dein (BMW)	(West Germany) Klaus Enders/ (West Germany) Ralf Engelhardt (BMW)
1968	125 cc	(United Kingdom) Phil Read (Yamaha)	(United Kingdom) Bill Ivy (Yamaha)	(East Germany) Heinz Rosner (MZ)	(United Kingdom) Bill Ivy (Yamaha)
1968	250 cc	(United Kingdom) Phil Read (Yamaha)	(East Germany) Heinz Rosner (MZ)	(United Kingdom) Rodney Gould (Bultaco-Yamaha)	(United Kingdom) Phil Read (Yamaha)
1968	500 cc	(Italy) Giacomo Agostini (MV Agusta)	(Australia) Jack Findlay (McIntyre-Matchless)	(United Kingdom) Derek Woodman (Seeley)	(Italy) Giacomo Agostini (MV Agusta)
1968	Sidecars	(West Germany) Helmut Fath/ (West Germany) Wolfgang Kalauch (URS)	(West Germany) Heinz Luthringshauser/ (United Kingdom) Geoff Hughes (BMW)	(West Germany) Georg Auerbacher/ (West Germany) Hermann Hahn (BMW)	(West Germany) Helmut Fath/ (West Germany) Wolfgang Kalauch (URS)
1969	125 cc	(United Kingdom) Dave Simmonds (Kawasaki)	(East Germany) Günter Bartusch (MZ)	(Netherlands) Cees van Dongen (Suzuki)	(United Kingdom) Dave Simmonds (Kawasaki)
1969	250 cc	(Sweden) Kent Andersson (Yamaha)	(East Germany) Günter Bartusch (MZ)	(Sweden) Börje Jansson (Yamaha)	(Sweden) Kent Andersson (Yamaha)
1969	350 cc	(Italy) Giacomo Agostini (MV Agusta)	(United Kingdom) Rodney Gould (Yamaha)	(Italy) Giuseppe Visenzi (Yamaha)	(Italy) Giacomo Agostini (MV Agusta)
1969	500 cc	(Italy) Giacomo Agostini (MV Agusta)	(United Kingdom) Billie Nelson (Paton)	(United Kingdom) Godfrey Nash (Norton)	(Italy) Giacomo Agostini (MV Agusta)
1969	Sidecars	(West Germany) Klaus Enders/ (West Germany) Ralf Engelhardt (BMW)	(West Germany) Helmut Lünemann/ (Sweden) Johnny Bengtsson (BMW)	(West Germany) Heinz Luthringshauser/ (United Kingdom) Geoff Hughes (BMW)	(West Germany) Helmut Fath/ (West Germany) Wolfgang Kalauch (URS)
1970	125 cc	(United Kingdom) Dave Simmonds (Kawasaki)	(East Germany) Thomas Heuschkel (MZ)	(East Germany) Hartmut Bischoff (MZ)	(Spain) Ángel Nieto (Derbi)
1970	250 cc	(United Kingdom) Rodney Gould (Yamaha)	(Sweden) Kent Andersson (Yamaha)	(United Kingdom) Paul Smart (Yamaha)	(United Kingdom) Rodney Gould (Yamaha)
1970	350 cc	(Italy) Giacomo Agostini (MV Agusta)	(Sweden) Kent Andersson (Yamaha)	(United Kingdom) Rodney Gould (Yamaha)	(Italy) Giacomo Agostini (MV Agusta)
1970	500 cc	(Italy) Giacomo Agostini (MV Agusta)	(New Zealand) Ginger Molloy (Kawasaki)	(Italy) Alberto Pagani (Linto)	(Italy) Giacomo Agostini (MV Agusta)
1970	Sidecars	(West Germany) Klaus Enders/ (West Germany) Ralf Engelhardt (BMW)	(West Germany) Siegfried Schauzu/ (United Kingdom) Peter Rutterford (BMW)	(West Germany) Arsenius Butscher/ (West Germany) Josef Huber (BMW)	(West Germany) Klaus Enders/ (West Germany) Ralf Engelhardt (BMW)
1971	125 cc	(United Kingdom) Barry Sheene (Suzuki)	(West Germany) Dieter Braun (Maico)	(West Germany) Gert Bender (Maico)	(United Kingdom) Barry Sheene (Suzuki)
1971	250 cc	(United Kingdom) Rodney Gould (Yamaha)	(Australia) John Dodds (Yamaha)	(West Germany) Dieter Braun (Yamaha)	(Finland) Jarno Saarinen (Yamaha)
1971	350 cc	(Italy) Giacomo Agostini (MV Agusta)	(Finland) Jarno Saarinen (Yamaha)	(United Kingdom) Billie Nelson (Yamaha)	(Italy) Giacomo Agostini (MV Agusta)
1971	500 cc	(Italy) Giacomo Agostini (MV Agusta)	(United Kingdom) Dave Simmonds (Kawasaki)	(Netherlands) Rob Bron (Suzuki)	(Italy) Giacomo Agostini (MV Agusta)
1971	Sidecars	(West Germany) Horst Owesle/ (United Kingdom) Peter Rutterford (Münch-URS)	(West Germany) Richard Wegener/ (West Germany) Adi Heinrichs (BMW)	(Switzerland) Jean-Claude Castella/ (Switzerland) Albert Castella (BMW)	(West Germany) Siegfried Schauzu/ (West Germany) Wolfgang Kalauch (BMW)
1972	125 cc	(Sweden) Kent Andersson (Yamaha)	(Spain) Ángel Nieto (Derbi)	(West Germany) Dieter Braun (Maico)	(Sweden) Kent Andersson (Yamaha)
1972	250 cc	(Finland) Jarno Saarinen (Yamaha)	(Italy) Silvio Grassetti (MZ)	(Sweden) Kent Andersson (Yamaha)	(Finland) Jarno Saarinen (Yamaha)
1972	350 cc	(Italy) Giacomo Agostini (MV Agusta)	(Finland) Jarno Saarinen (Yamaha)	(Italy) Renzo Pasolini (Aermacchi)	(Italy) Giacomo Agostini (MV Agusta)
1972	500 cc	(Italy) Giacomo Agostini (MV Agusta)	(Italy) Alberto Pagani (MV Agusta)	(United Kingdom) Rodney Gould (Yamaha)	(Italy) Giacomo Agostini (MV Agusta)
1972	Sidecars	(United Kingdom) Chris Vincent/ (United Kingdom) Michael Casey (Münch-URS)	(West Germany) Klaus Enders/ (West Germany) Ralf Engelhardt (Busch-BMW)	(West Germany) Siegfried Schauzu/ (West Germany) Wolfgang Kalauch (BMW)	(United Kingdom) Chris Vincent/ (United Kingdom) Michael Casey (Münch-URS)

=== From 1973 to 1982 ===
(Coloured background = the race was boycotted by international competitors)

Year	Class	1st	2nd	3rd	Pole Position	Fastest Lap
1973	125 cc	(Italy) Otello Buscherini (Malanca)	(Sweden) Kent Andersson (Yamaha)	(Sweden) Börje Jansson (Maico)	(Sweden) Kent Andersson (Yamaha)	(Italy) Otello Buscherini (Malanca)
1973	250 cc	(Finland) Teuvo Länsivuori (Yamaha)	(West Germany) Dieter Braun (Yamaha)	(Australia) John Dodds (Yamaha)	(Finland) Teuvo Länsivuori (Yamaha)	(Finland) Teuvo Länsivuori (Yamaha)
1973	350 cc	(Italy) Giacomo Agostini (MV Agusta)	(United Kingdom) Phil Read (MV Agusta)	(Australia) John Dodds (Yamaha)	(Finland) Teuvo Länsivuori (Yamaha)	(Australia) John Dodds (Yamaha)
1973	500 cc	(Italy) Giacomo Agostini (MV Agusta)	(United Kingdom) Phil Read (MV Agusta)	(Switzerland) Bruno Kneubühler (Yamaha)	(Italy) Giacomo Agostini (MV Agusta)	(Italy) Giacomo Agostini (MV Agusta)
1973	Sidecars	(Finland) Kalevi Rahko/ (Finland) Kari Laatikainen (Honda)	(Finland) Jaakko Palomäki/ (Finland) Juhani Vesterinen (BMW)	(Finland) Pentti Moskari/ (Finland) Olaf Sten (BMW)	Unknown	(Finland) Matti Satukangas/ (Finland) Alanen (Sachs)
1974	50 cc	(Belgium) Julien van Zeebroeck (Van Veen-Kreidler)	(West Germany) Rudolf Kunz (Kreidler)	(Switzerland) Ulrich Graf (Kreidler)	(Belgium) Julien van Zeebroeck (Van Veen-Kreidler)	(Belgium) Julien van Zeebroeck (Van Veen-Kreidler)
1974	250 cc	(Italy) Walter Villa (Harley-Davidson)	(France) Michel Rougerie (Harley-Davidson)	(West Germany) Dieter Braun (Yamaha)	(France) Michel Rougerie (Harley-Davidson)	(Italy) Walter Villa (Harley-Davidson)
1974	350 cc	(Australia) John Dodds (Yamaha)	(Switzerland) Bruno Kneubühler (Yamaha)	(West Germany) Dieter Braun (Yamaha)	(Finland) Teuvo Länsivuori (Yamaha)	(Switzerland) Bruno Kneubühler (Yamaha)
1974	500 cc	(United Kingdom) Phil Read (MV Agusta)	(Italy) Gianfranco Bonera (MV Agusta)	(Finland) Teuvo Länsivuori (Yamaha)	(United Kingdom) Phil Read (MV Agusta)	(Finland) Teuvo Länsivuori (Yamaha)
1975	50 cc	(Spain) Ángel Nieto (Kreidler)	(Italy) Eugenio Lazzarini (Piovaticci)	(West Germany) Rudolf Kunz (Kreidler)	(Italy) Eugenio Lazzarini (Piovaticci)	(Spain) Ángel Nieto (Kreidler)
1975	250 cc	(France) Michel Rougerie (Harley-Davidson)	(Venezuela) Johnny Cecotto (Yamaha)	(Italy) Otello Buscherini (Yamaha)	(France) Michel Rougerie (Harley-Davidson)	(Venezuela) Johnny Cecotto (Yamaha)
1975	350 cc	(Venezuela) Johnny Cecotto (Yamaha)	(Italy) Giacomo Agostini (Yamaha)	(France) Patrick Pons (Yamaha)	(Venezuela) Johnny Cecotto (Yamaha)	(France) Patrick Pons (Yamaha)
1975	500 cc	(Italy) Giacomo Agostini (Yamaha)	(Finland) Teuvo Länsivuori (Yamaha)	(Australia) Jack Findlay (Yamaha)	(Italy) Gianfranco Bonera (MV Agusta)	(Italy) Giacomo Agostini (Yamaha)
1976	50 cc	(Belgium) Julien van Zeebroeck (Kreidler)	(Switzerland) Ulrich Graf (Kreidler)	(Italy) Eugenio Lazzarini (UFO)	(Spain) Ángel Nieto (Bultaco)	(Switzerland) Ulrich Graf (Kreidler)
1976	125 cc	(Italy) Pier Paolo Bianchi (Morbidelli)	(West Germany) Gert Bender (Bender)	(Netherlands) Henk van Kessel (AGV Condor)	(Italy) Pier Paolo Bianchi (Morbidelli)	(Italy) Pier Paolo Bianchi (Morbidelli)
1976	250 cc	(Italy) Walter Villa (Harley-Davidson)	(Japan) Takazumi Katayama (Yamaha)	(Italy) Gianfranco Bonera (Harley-Davidson)	(Italy) Walter Villa (Harley-Davidson)	(Italy) Gianfranco Bonera (Harley-Davidson)
1976	350 cc	(Italy) Walter Villa (Harley-Davidson)	(West Germany) Dieter Braun (Morbidelli)	(Northern Ireland) Tom Herron (Yamaha)	(Italy) Walter Villa (Harley-Davidson)	(West Germany) Dieter Braun (Morbidelli)
1976	500 cc	(United States) Pat Hennen (Suzuki)	(Finland) Teuvo Länsivuori (Suzuki)	(Switzerland) Philippe Coulon (Suzuki)	(Italy) Giacomo Agostini (Suzuki)	(United Kingdom) John Newbold (Suzuki)
1977	125 cc	(Italy) Pier Paolo Bianchi (Morbidelli)	(Italy) Eugenio Lazzarini (Morbidelli)	(France) Jean-Louis Guignabodet (Morbidelli)	(Italy) Pier Paolo Bianchi (Morbidelli)	(Italy) Pier Paolo Bianchi (Morbidelli)
1977	250 cc	(Italy) Walter Villa (Harley-Davidson)	(United Kingdom) Mick Grant (Kawasaki)	(South Africa) Kork Ballington (Yamaha)	(South Africa) Alan North (Yamaha)	(Italy) Walter Villa (Harley-Davidson)
1977	350 cc	(Japan) Takazumi Katayama (Yamaha)	(France) Christian Sarron (Yamaha)	(South Africa) Jon Ekerold (Yamaha)	(Venezuela) Johnny Cecotto (Yamaha)	(South Africa) Jon Ekerold (Yamaha)
1977	500 cc	(Venezuela) Johnny Cecotto (Yamaha)	(Italy) Marco Lucchinelli (Suzuki)	(Italy) Gianfranco Bonera (Suzuki)	(United Kingdom) Barry Sheene (Suzuki)	(Venezuela) Johnny Cecotto (Yamaha)
1978	125 cc	(Spain) Ángel Nieto (Minarelli)	(Italy) Eugenio Lazzarini (MBA)	(Austria) Harald Bartol (Morbidelli)	(Italy) Eugenio Lazzarini (MBA)	(Spain) Ángel Nieto (Minarelli)
1978	250 cc	(South Africa) Kork Ballington (Kawasaki)	(Australia) Gregg Hansford (Kawasaki)	(Italy) Mario Lega (Morbidelli)	(Australia) Gregg Hansford (Kawasaki)	(South Africa) Kork Ballington (Kawasaki)
1978	350 cc	(South Africa) Kork Ballington (Kawasaki)	(Japan) Takazumi Katayama (Yamaha)	(Northern Ireland) Tom Herron (Yamaha)	(South Africa) Kork Ballington (Kawasaki)	(Japan) Takazumi Katayama (Yamaha)
1978	500 cc	(Netherlands) Wil Hartog (Suzuki)	(Japan) Takazumi Katayama (Yamaha)	(Venezuela) Johnny Cecotto (Yamaha)	(Venezuela) Johnny Cecotto (Yamaha)	(Venezuela) Johnny Cecotto (Yamaha)
1979	125 cc	(Spain) Ricardo Tormo (Bultaco)	(Finland) Matti Kinnunen (MBA)	(Switzerland) Hans Müller (MBA)	(Switzerland) Stefan Dörflinger (Morbidelli)	(Spain) Ricardo Tormo (Bultaco)
1979	250 cc	(South Africa) Kork Ballington (Kawasaki)	(South Africa) Gregg Hansford (Kawasaki)	(France) Patrick Fernandez (Yamaha)	(West Germany) Toni Mang (Kawasaki)	(South Africa) Gregg Hansford (Kawasaki)
1979	350 cc	(South Africa) Gregg Hansford (Kawasaki)	(France) Patrick Fernandez (Yamaha)	(Finland) Pentti Korhonen (Yamaha)	(South Africa) Kork Ballington (Kawasaki)	(South Africa) Gregg Hansford (Kawasaki)
1979	500 cc	(Netherlands) Boet van Dulmen (Suzuki)	(United States) Randy Mamola (Suzuki)	(United Kingdom) Barry Sheene (Suzuki)	(Netherlands) Boet van Dulmen (Suzuki)	(Netherlands) Jack Middelburg (Suzuki)
1980	125 cc	(Spain) Ángel Nieto (Minarelli)	(Italy) Pier Paolo Bianchi (MBA)	(Switzerland) Hans Müller (MBA)	(France) Guy Bertin (Motobécane)	(Spain) Ángel Nieto (Minarelli)
1980	250 cc	(South Africa) Kork Ballington (Kawasaki)	(West Germany) Toni Mang (Krauser)	(Switzerland) Roland Freymond (Ad Maiora)	(West Germany) Toni Mang (Krauser)	(South Africa) Kork Ballington (Kawasaki)
1980	500 cc	(Netherlands) Wil Hartog (Suzuki)	(United States) Kenny Roberts (Yamaha)	(Italy) Franco Uncini (Suzuki)	(Italy) Graziano Rossi (Suzuki)	(Italy) Marco Lucchinelli (Suzuki)
1980	Sidecars	(United Kingdom) Jock Taylor/ (Sweden) Benga Johansson (Windle-Yamaha)	(West Germany) Werner Schwärzel/ (West Germany) Andreas Huber (Yamaha)	(Switzerland) Bruno Holzer/ (Switzerland) Karl Meierhans (LCR-Yamaha)	(France) Alain Michel/ (West Germany) Michael Burkhard (Seymaz-Yamaha)	(Switzerland) Rolf Biland/ (Switzerland) Kurt Waltisperg (LCR-Yamaha)
1981	125 cc	(Spain) Ángel Nieto (Minarelli)	(France) Jacques Bolle (Motobécane)	(Italy) Maurizio Vitali (MBA)	(Italy) Pier Paolo Bianchi (MBA)	(Switzerland) Hans Müller (MBA)
1981	250 cc	(West Germany) Toni Mang (Kawasaki)	(France) Jean-François Baldé (Kawasaki)	(France) Jean-Louis Guignabodet (Kawasaki)	(West Germany) Toni Mang (Kawasaki)	(West Germany) Toni Mang (Kawasaki)
1981	500 cc	(Italy) Marco Lucchinelli (Suzuki)	(United States) Randy Mamola (Suzuki)	(South Africa) Kork Ballington (Kawasaki)	(Italy) Marco Lucchinelli (Suzuki)	(Italy) Marco Lucchinelli (Suzuki) en (Netherlands) Jack Middelburg (Suzuki)
1981	Sidecars	(Switzerland) Rolf Biland/ (Switzerland) Kurt Waltisperg (LCR-Yamaha)	(United Kingdom) Jock Taylor/ (Sweden) Benga Johansson (Fowler-Yamaha)	(West Germany) Werner Schwärzel/ (West Germany) Andreas Huber (Seymaz-Yamaha)	(Switzerland) Rolf Biland/ (Switzerland) Kurt Waltisperg (LCR-Yamaha)	(West Germany) Werner Schwärzel/ (West Germany) Andreas Huber (Seymaz-Yamaha)
1982	125 cc	(Venezuela) Iván Palazzese (MBA)	(Austria) August Auinger (Bartol-MBA)	(Finland) Johnny Wickström (MBA)	(Switzerland) Hans Müller (MBA)	(Venezuela) Iván Palazzese (MBA)
1982	250 cc	(France) Christian Sarron (Yamaha)	(Belgium) Didier de Radiguès (Chevallier-Yamaha)	(Spain) Sito Pons (Kobas-Rotax)	(Belgium) Didier de Radiguès (Chevallier-Yamaha)	(France) Christian Sarron (Yamaha)
1982	350 cc	(West Germany) Toni Mang (Kawasaki)	(France) Christian Sarron (Yamaha)	(Northern Ireland) Donnie Robinson (Yamaha)	(Belgium) Didier de Radiguès (Chevallier-Yamaha)	(West Germany) Toni Mang (Kawasaki)
1982	Sidecars	(Switzerland) Rolf Biland/ (Switzerland) Kurt Waltisperg (LCR-Yamaha)	(France) Alain Michel/ (West Germany) Michael Burkhard (Seymaz-Yamaha)	(West Germany) Werner Schwärzel/ (West Germany) Andreas Huber (Seymaz-Yamaha)	(Switzerland) Rolf Biland/ (Switzerland) Kurt Waltisperg (LCR-Yamaha)	(Switzerland) Rolf Biland/ (Switzerland) Kurt Waltisperg (LCR-Yamaha)

== References and notes ==
- Translated from the Dutch version of this page
