= 1978 Dutch TT =

(Netherlands) 1978 Dutch TT
Race details
- Race 6 of 13 races in the 1978 Grand Prix motorcycle racing season
- Date: 24 June 1978
- Official name: Dutch TT 1978
- Location: Circuit van Drenthe Assen
- Course: Permanent racing facility; 7.718 km (4.796 mi)

500cc
Pole position
- Rider: (Venezuela) Johnny Cecotto
- Time: 3:01.900
Fastest lap
- Rider: (United States) Kenny Roberts
- Time: 2:57.400
Podium
- First: (Venezuela) Johnny Cecotto
- Second: (United States) Kenny Roberts
- Third: (United Kingdom) Barry Sheene

350cc
Pole position
- Rider: (Italy) Franco Uncini
- Time: 3:05.700
Fastest lap
- Rider: (Italy) Franco Bonera
- Time: 3:18.800
Podium
- First: (South Africa) Kork Ballington
- Second: (Italy) Franco Bonera
- Third: (South Africa) Jon Ekerold

250cc
Pole position
- Rider: (United States) Kenny Roberts
- Time: 3:09.000
Fastest lap
- Rider: (United States) Kenny Roberts
- Time: 3:09.600
Podium
- First: (United States) Kenny Roberts
- Second: (South Africa) Kork Ballington
- Third: (Australia) Gregg Hansford

125cc
Pole position
- Rider: (Italy) Eugenio Lazzarini
- Time: 3:15.500
Fastest lap
- Rider: (Italy) Eugenio Lazzarini
- Time: 3:16.600
Podium
- First: (Italy) Eugenio Lazzarini
- Second: (Italy) Maurizio Massimiani
- Third: (Austria) Harald Bartol

50cc
Pole position
Rider	(Italy) Eugenio Lazzarini	Kreidler
Time	3:36.600	
Fastest lap
Rider	(Italy) Eugenio Lazzarini	
Time	3:34.800	
Podium
First	(Italy) Eugenio Lazzarini	
Second	(Spain) Ricardo Tormo	
Third	(France) Patrick Plisson	

Sidecar (B2A)
Pole position
- Rider: (Switzerland) Rolf Biland
- Time: 3:16.000
Fastest lap
- Rider: (Switzerland) Rolf Biland
- Time: 3:11.500
Podium
- First: (West Germany) Werner Schwärzel
- Second: (Switzerland) Jean-François Monnin
- Third: (United Kingdom) Dick Greasley

The 1978 Dutch TT was the sixth round of the 1978 Grand Prix motorcycle racing season. It took place on the weekend of 22–24 June 1978 at the Circuit van Drenthe Assen.

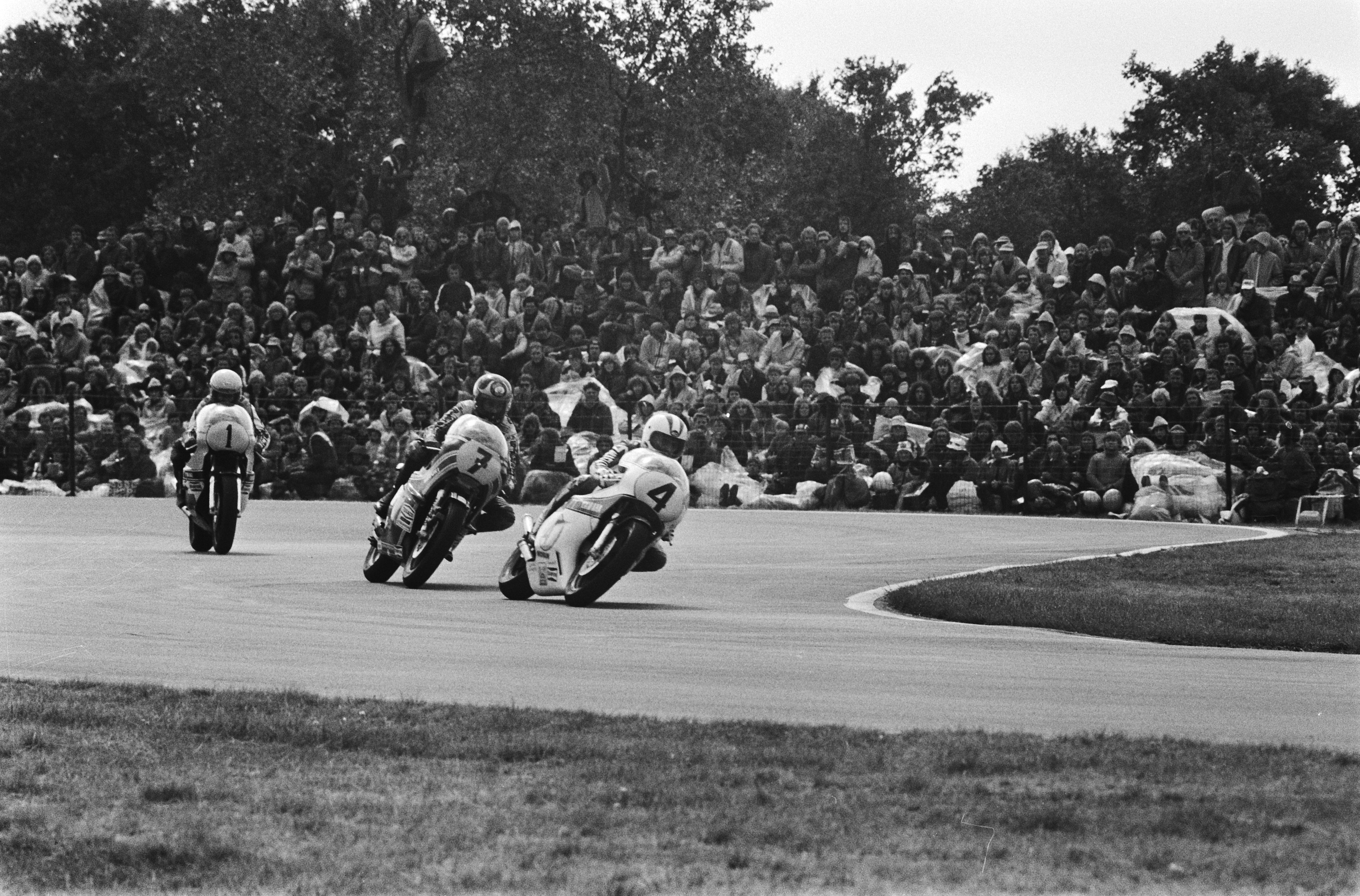
Johnny Cecotto leads Barry Sheene and Kenny Roberts during the 1978 500cc Dutch TT race

== Classification ==
=== 500 cc ===
Pos.	Rider	Team	Manufacturer	Time/Retired	Points
1	(Venezuela) Johnny Cecotto	Yamaha Motor Company	Yamaha	48'17.100	15
2	(United States) Kenny Roberts	Yamaha Motor Company	Yamaha	+0.100	12
3	(United Kingdom) Barry Sheene	Texaco Heron Team Suzuki	Suzuki	+3.100	10
4	(Japan) Takazumi Katayama	Sarome & Motul Team	Yamaha	+13.200	8
5	(Netherlands) Wil Hartog	Riemersma Racing	Suzuki	+36.100	6
6	(France) Michel Rougerie		Suzuki	+43.400	5
7	(United Kingdom) John Newbold	Ray Hamblin Motorcycles	Suzuki	+43.600	4
8	(Netherlands) Boet van Dulmen		Suzuki	+45.200	3
9	(United States) Steve Baker	Team Gallina Nava Olio Fiat	Suzuki	+1 lap	2
10	(United Kingdom) Steve Parrish		Suzuki	+1 lap	1
11	(Switzerland) Philippe Coulon	Marlboro Nava Total	Suzuki	Retired	
12	(Finland) Teuvo Länsivuori		Suzuki	+1 lap	
13	(Italy) Franco Bonera	Team Kiwi Yamoto	Suzuki	+1 lap	
14	(United Kingdom) Alex George		Suzuki	+1 lap	
15	(Netherlands) Jack Middelburg		Suzuki	+1 lap	
16	(Italy) Graziano Rossi	Team Gallina Nava Olio Fiat	Suzuki	+1 lap	
17	(New Zealand) John Woodley	Sid Griffiths Racing	Suzuki	+1 lap	
18	(Austria) Max Wiener		Suzuki	+1 lap	
19	(Netherlands) Dick Alblas		Suzuki	+1 lap	
20	(West Germany) Gerhard Vogt	Bill Smith Racing	Yamaha	+1 lap	
20	(West Germany) Franz Rau	Kazenmaier Autovermietung	Suzuki	+1 lap	
21	(West Germany) Gerhard Vogt	Bill Smith Racing	Suzuki	+1 lap	
22	(Netherlands) Cees Scheepens		Suzuki	+1 lap	
Ret	(Italy) Marco Lucchinelli	Cagiva Corse	Suzuki	Retired	
Ret	(South Africa) Leslie van Breda		Suzuki	Retired	
Ret	(Switzerland) Bruno Kneubühler	RSS Racing Team	Suzuki	Retired	
Ret	(Switzerland) Piet van der Wal	RSS Racing Team	Yamaha	Retired	
Ret	(Italy) Gianni Rolando	Team Librenti	Suzuki	Accident	
Ret	(Italy) Virginio Ferrari	Team Gallina Nava Olio Fiat	Suzuki	Tyre problems	
Ret	(United Kingdom) John Williams	Team Appleby Glade	Suzuki	Retired	
DNS	(United Kingdom) Dave Potter	Ted Broad	Suzuki	Did not start	
DNS	(Sweden) Bo Granath		Suzuki	Did not start	
DNQ	(France) Jean-Claude Hogrel	Buton	Buton	Did not qualify	
DNQ	(Denmark) Børge Nielsen		Suzuki	Did not qualify	
DNQ	(Austria) Hans Braumandl		Suzuki	Did not qualify	

=== 350cc ===
Pos	No.	Rider	Manufacturer	Laps	Time	Grid	Points
1	1	(South Africa) Kork Ballington	Kawasaki	16	54:32.9	3	15
2	27	(Italy) Franco Bonera	Yamaha	16	+11.6		12
3	3	(South Africa) Jon Ekerold	Yamaha	16	+23.6	7	10
4	12	(Finland) Pentti Korhonen	Yamaha	16	+29.3		8
5	7	(France) Christian Sarron	Yamaha	16	+49.2		6
6	2	(United Kingdom) Tom Herron	Yamaha	16	+56.4	5	5
7	22	(United Kingdom) Mick Grant	Kawasaki	16		2	4
8	6	(Australia) Gregg Hansford	Kawasaki	16			3
9	40	(Netherlands) Piet van der Wal	Yamaha	16			2
10	20	(Italy) Franco Uncini	Yamaha	16		1	1
11	11	(Australia) Vic Soussan	Yamaha	16		10	
12	21	(Finland) Eero Hyvärinen	Yamaha	16			
13	36	(Netherlands) Jack Middelburg	Yamaha	16			
14	39	(Netherlands) Bert Struyk	Yamaha	16			
15	14	(Spain) Víctor Palomo	Yamaha	15	+1 lap		
		(Japan) Takazumi Katayama	Yamaha			4	
		(France) Michel Rougerie	Yamaha			6	
		(France) Olivier Chevallier	Yamaha			8	
		(France) Patrick Fernandez	Yamaha			9	
30 starters in total, 16 finishers

=== 250cc ===
Pos	No.	Rider	Manufacturer	Laps	Time	Grid	Points
1	7	(United States) Kenny Roberts	Yamaha	15	49:30.4	1	15
2	6	(South Africa) Kork Ballington	Kawasaki	15	+9.1	4	12
3	4	(Australia) Gregg Hansford	Kawasaki	15	+37.7	3	10
4	2	(Italy) Franco Uncini	Yamaha	15	+42.8	8	8
5	20	(Italy) Paolo Pileri	Morbidelli	15	+1:12.7		6
6	12	(Finland) Pentti Korhonen	Yamaha	15	+1:22.1		5
7	11	(Australia) Vic Soussan	Yamaha	15	+1:33.9		4
8	9	(France) Patrick Fernandez	Yamaha	15	+1:34.2	2	3
9	16	(Finland) Pekka Nurmi	Yamaha	15			2
10	1	(Italy) Mario Lega	Morbidelli	15			1
11	17	(Finland) Eero Hyvärinen	Yamaha	15			
12	36	(Netherlands) Bert Struyk	Yamaha	15		9	
13	14	(United Kingdom) Chas Mortimer	Yamaha	15			
14	27	(France) Jean-François Baldé	Kawasaki	15		10	
15	32	(Sweden) Leif Gustafsson	Yamaha	15			
		(United Kingdom) Mick Grant	Kawasaki			5	
		(France) Christian Estrosi	Kawasaki			6	
		(Australia) John Dodds	Yamaha			7	
30 starters in total, 20 finishers

=== 125cc ===
Pos	No.	Rider	Manufacturer	Laps	Time	Grid	Points
1	2	(Italy) Eugenio Lazzarini	MBA	14	46:56.7	1	15
2	10	(Italy) Maurizio Massimiani	Morbidelli	14	+33.1	4	12
3	6	(Austria) Harald Bartol	Morbidelli	14	+1:03.2	3	10
4	40	(France) Patrick Plisson	Morbidelli	14	+1:28.7	10	8
5	4	(France) Jean-Louis Guignabodet	Morbidelli	14	+1:39.3		6
6	12	(Sweden) Per-Edward Carlson	Morbidelli	14	+1:41.7		5
7	19	(Netherlands) Cees van Dongen	Morbidelli	14	+1:44.0		4
8	14	(Finland) Matti Kinnunen	Morbidelli	14		7	3
9	34	(Netherlands) Henk van Kessel	Condor	14			2
10	39	(Netherlands) Bennie Wilbers	Morbidelli	14			1
11	37	(Netherlands) Theo Timmer	Morbidelli	14			
12	24	(West Germany) Walter Koschine	Bender	14			
13	33	(Netherlands) Theo van Geffen	Morbidelli	14			
14	23	(United Kingdom) Clive Horton	Morbidelli	14			
15	35	(Netherlands) Peter van Niel	Morbidelli	13	+1 lap		
		(Italy) Pierpaolo Bianchi	Minarelli			2	
		(France) Thierry Espié	Motobécane			5	
		(Switzerland) Hans Müller	Morbidelli			6	
		(Spain) Ángel Nieto	Bultaco			8	
		(Netherlands) J. Bosman	Morbidelli			9	
30 starters in total, 16 finishers

=== 50cc ===
Pos	No.	Rider	Manufacturer	Laps	Time	Grid	Points
1	1	(Italy) Eugenio Lazzarini	Kreidler	9	32:34.2	1	15
2	2	(Spain) Ricardo Tormo	Bultaco	9	+22.6	2	12
3	3	(France) Patrick Plisson	ABF	9	+1:23.4	3	10
4	21	(Netherlands) Peter Looyestein	Kreidler	9	+1:31.3	4	8
5	16	(West Germany) Wolfgang Müller	Kreidler	9	+1:55.7	7	6
6	18	(West Germany) Ingo Emmerich	Kreidler	9	+2:07.4	9	5
7	33	(Netherlands) Gerrit Strikker	Kreidler	9			4
8	13	(Switzerland) Rolf Blatter	Kreidler	9			3
9	10	(Netherlands) Cees van Dongen	Kreidler	9			2
10	20	(France) Jacques Hutteau	Kreidler	9			1
11	34	(Netherlands) J. Welvaarts	Kreidler	9			
12	8	(West Germany) Hagen Klein	Kreidler	9			
13	22	(Belgium) Chris Baert	Kreidler	9			
14	23	(France) Daniel Corvi	Kreidler	9			
15	15	(Italy) Claudio Lusuardi	Bultaco	9			
		(Netherlands) Theo Timmer	Bultaco			5	
		(Switzerland) Hans Müller	Kreidler			6	
		(Netherlands) Theo van Geffen	Kreidler			8	
		(Netherlands) Ton Koojiman	Hemeyla			10	
30 starters in total, 18 finishers

=== Sidecar classification ===
Pos	No.	Rider	Passenger	Manufacturer	Laps	Time	Grid	Points
1	2	(West Germany) Werner Schwärzel	(West Germany) Andreas Huber	Fath	14	46:12.7	2	15
2	11	(Switzerland) Jean-François Monnin	(Switzerland) Paul Gerard	Seymaz-Yamaha	14	+46.7	4	12
3	6	(United Kingdom) Dick Greasley	(United Kingdom) Gordon Russell	Busch-Yamaha	14	+54.1	6	10
4	8	(Switzerland) Bruno Holzer	(Switzerland) Karl Meierhans	LCR-Yamaha	14		3	8
5	5	(Sweden) Göte Brodin	(Sweden) Per-Erik Wickström	Yamaha	14		7	6
6	15	(France) Yvan Troillet	(France) Pierre Muller	GEP-Yamaha	14		5	5
7	10	(Switzerland) Hermann Schmid	(United Kingdom) Kenny Arthur	Schmid-Yamaha	14			4
8	23	(Netherlands) Boy Brouwer	(Netherlands) Jan Oostwouder	Coan-Yamaha	14			3
9	9	(West Germany) Max Venus	(West Germany) Norbert Bitterman	CAT-Yamaha	14			2
10	16	(United Kingdom) Bill Hodgkins	(United Kingdom) John Parkins	Windle-Yamaha	13	+1 lap		1
		(Switzerland) Rolf Biland	(United Kingdom) Kenny Williams	Beo-Yamaha			1	
		(West Germany) Rolf Steinhausen	(West Germany) Wolfgang Kalauch	Seymaz-Yamaha			8	
		(Italy) Amedeo Zini	(Italy) Andrea Fornero	König			9	
22 starters in total, 11 finishers

Previous race: 1978 Nations Grand Prix	FIM Grand Prix World Championship; 1978 season	Next race: 1978 Belgian Grand Prix
Previous race: 1977 Dutch TT	Dutch TT	Next race: 1979 Dutch TT
