= 1979 British motorcycle Grand Prix =

(United Kingdom) 1979 British Grand Prix
Race details
- Race 11 of 13 races in the 1979 Grand Prix motorcycle racing season
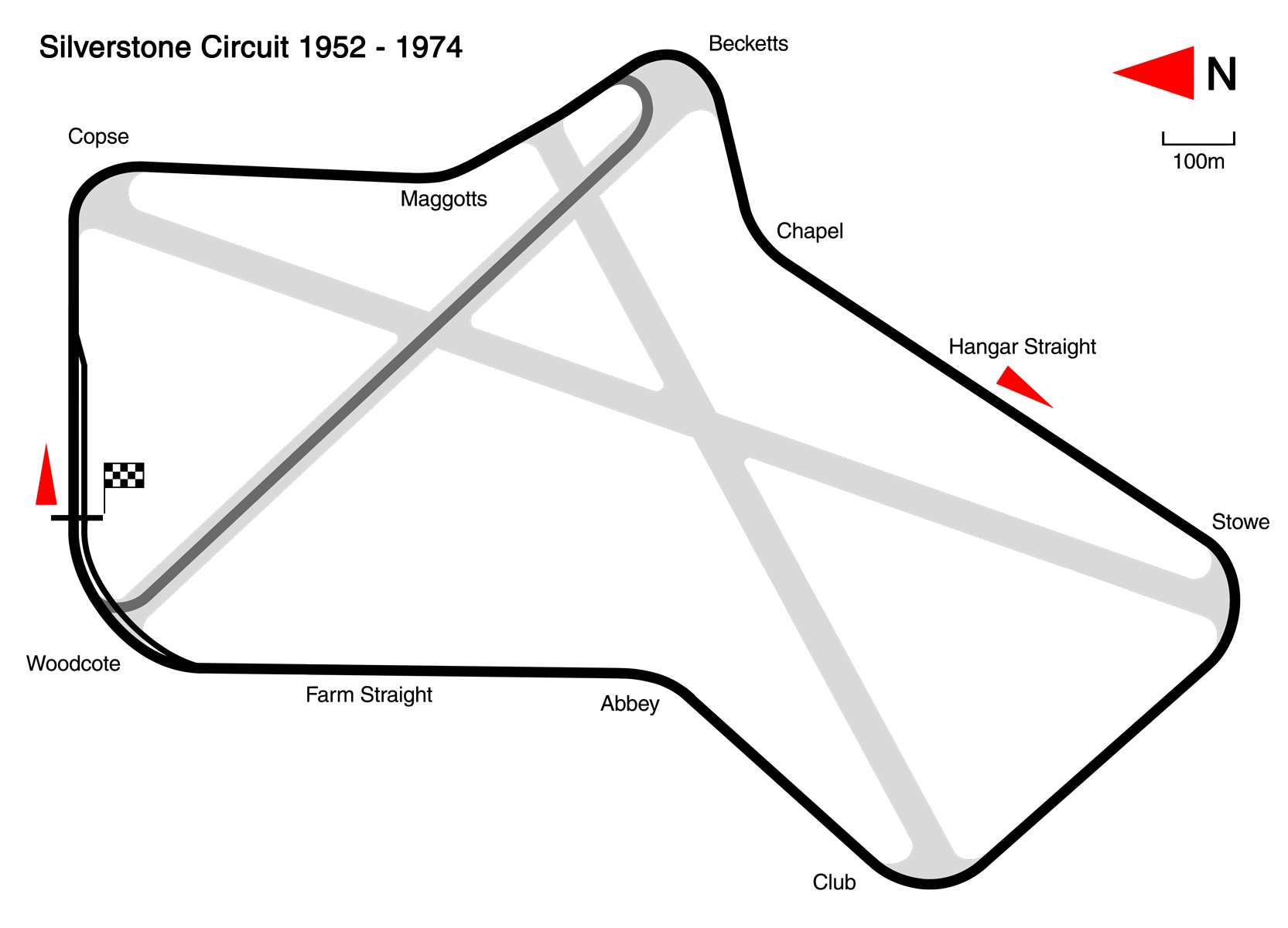
- Date: 12 August 1979
- Official name: Marlboro British Grand Prix
- Location: Silverstone Circuit
- Course: Permanent racing facility; 4.711 km (2.927 mi)

500cc
Pole position
- Rider: (United States) Kenny Roberts
- Time: 1:29.810
Fastest lap
- Rider: (United Kingdom) Barry Sheene
- Time: 1:29.980
Podium
- First: (United States) Kenny Roberts
- Second: (United Kingdom) Barry Sheene
- Third: (Netherlands) Wil Hartog

350cc
Pole position
- Rider: (France) Éric Saul
- Time: Unknown
Fastest lap
- Rider: (South Africa) Kork Ballington
- Time: Unknown
Podium
- First: (South Africa) Kork Ballington
- Second: (Australia) Gregg Hansford
- Third: (Australia) Jeff Sayle

250cc
Pole position
- Rider: (South Africa) Kork Ballington
- Time: 1:36.220
Fastest lap
- Rider: (South Africa) Kork Ballington
- Time: 1:35.110
Podium
- First: (South Africa) Kork Ballington
- Second: (United States) Randy Mamola
- Third: (West Germany) Anton Mang

125cc
Pole position
- Rider: (Switzerland) Hans Müller
- Time: 1:42.650
Fastest lap
- Rider: (Italy) Pier Paolo Bianchi
- Time: 1:42.200
Podium
- First: (Spain) Ángel Nieto
- Second: (West Germany) Gert Bender
- Third: (France) Guy Bertin

Sidecar (B2A)
Pole position
- Rider: (United Kingdom) Derek Jones
- Passenger: (United Kingdom) Brian Ayres
Fastest lap
- Rider: (United Kingdom) Jock Taylor
- Passenger: (Sweden) Benga Johansson
Podium
- First rider: (Switzerland) Rolf Biland
- First passenger: (Switzerland) Kurt Waltisperg
- Second rider: (United Kingdom) Jock Taylor
- Second passenger: (Sweden) Benga Johansson
- Third rider: (United Kingdom) Dick Greasley
- Third passenger: (United Kingdom) John Parkins

Sidecars (B2B)
Pole position
- Rider: (Switzerland) Rolf Biland
- Passenger: (Switzerland) Kurt Waltisperg
Fastest lap
- Rider: (France) Alain Michel
- Passenger: (West Germany) Michael Burkhard
Podium
- First rider: (France) Alain Michel
- First passenger: (West Germany) Michael Burkhard
- Second rider: (Switzerland) Bruno Holzer
- Second passenger: (Switzerland) Karl Meierhans
- Third rider: (Japan) Masato Kumano
- Third passenger: (Japan) Isao Arifuku

The 1979 British motorcycle Grand Prix was the eleventh round of the 1979 Grand Prix motorcycle racing season. It took place on the weekend of 10–12 August 1979 at the Silverstone Circuit.

== Race summary ==
The 500cc British Grand Prix would be one of the closest races in Grand Prix history. The race began with Barry Sheene, Kenny Roberts and Wil Hartog breaking away from the rest of the field. At the midpoint of the race, Hartog fell off the pace as Sheene and Roberts continued to battle for the lead. The event featured numerous lead changes throughout the 28 lap race. Heading into the final lap of the race, the two leaders came upon lapped riders. Roberts was unhindered as he passed the slower riders however, Sheene was momentarily held up, allowing Roberts to increase his lead. An undeterred Sheene put in an impressive lap time to catch Roberts as they entered the final corner. With momentum on his side, Sheene attempted a last second pass, but Roberts was able to prevail over Sheene by a narrow margin of just three-hundredths of a second.

Minutes before the start of the race, Roberts' Yamaha blew a seal and sprayed the bike with oil. His crew managed to replace the seal in time but, Roberts went to the starting line with his gloves coated with oil, causing his hand to slip on the throttle during the race.

After an eleven-year absence from world championship racing, Honda returned to competition with the exotic, four-stroke NR500 ridden by riders Mick Grant and Takazumi Katayama. The motorcycle featured an engine with oval-shaped cylinders as well as a monocoque chassis. Both bikes retired from the race, Grant crashing out on the first turn after the bike spilled oil onto his rear tire. Katayama retired on the seventh lap due to ignition problems.

== Classification ==
=== 500 cc ===
Pos.	Rider	Team	Manufacturer	Time/Retired	Points
1	(United States) Kenny Roberts	Yamaha Motor Company	Yamaha	42'56.720	15
2	(United Kingdom) Barry Sheene	Texaco Heron Team Suzuki	Suzuki	+0.030	12
3	(Netherlands) Wil Hartog	Riemersma Racing	Suzuki	+4.970	10
4	(Italy) Virginio Ferrari	Team Gallina Nava Olio Fiat	Suzuki	+35.280	8
5	(Netherlands) Boet van Dulmen		Suzuki	+36.820	6
6	(France) Christian Sarron	Team Sonauto Gauloises	Yamaha	+40.650	5
7	(Italy) Franco Uncini	Team Zago International	Suzuki	+51.090	4
8	(Switzerland) Philippe Coulon		Suzuki	+51.250	3
9	(Italy) Marco Lucchinelli		Suzuki	+56.790	2
10	(United Kingdom) John Newbold	Team Appleby Glade	Suzuki	+1'16.490	1
11	(Italy) Carlo Perugini		Yamaha	+1'18.280	
12	(Italy) Gianni Rolando	Scuderia Naldoni	Suzuki	+1'19.910	
13	(Sweden) Peter Sjöström	Ava MC Stockholm	Suzuki	+1 lap	
14	(United Kingdom) Steve Ward	Auto 66 Club	Suzuki	+1 lap	
15	(United Kingdom) Keith Huewen	Len Manchester Motorcycles	Yamaha	+1 lap	
16	(Austria) Max Wiener		Suzuki	+2 laps	
17	(United Kingdom) George Fogarty	Sports Motorcycles	Suzuki	+2 laps	
18	(Netherlands) Henk de Vries	Team 77	Suzuki	+2 laps	
19	(Italy) Corrado Tuzii		Suzuki	+2 laps	
Ret	(France) Michel Rougerie		Suzuki	Retired	
Ret	(United Kingdom) Ron Haslam	Mal Carter	Suzuki	Retired	
Ret	(United Kingdom) Stan Woods		Yamaha	Retired	
Ret	(South Africa) Eddie Grant			Retired	
Ret	(United Kingdom) Gary Lingham		Suzuki	Retired	
Ret	(West Germany) Gerhard Vogt	Bill Smith Racing	Suzuki	Retired	
Ret	(New Zealand) John Woodley		Suzuki	Retired	
Ret	(Venezuela) Roberto Pietri		Suzuki	Retired	
Ret	(Italy) Gianni Pelletier		Suzuki	Retired	
Ret	(New Zealand) Dennis Ireland	Derry's Racing	Suzuki	Retired	
Ret	(Spain) Toni Garcia		Suzuki	Retired	
Ret	(West Germany) Josef Hage	Dieter Braun Team	Suzuki	Retired	
Ret	(United Kingdom) Roger Marshall	Dieter Braun Team	Silver Dream	Retired	
Ret	(United Kingdom) Alex George		Suzuki	Retired	
Ret	(United States) Randy Mamola	Serge Zago	Suzuki	Retired	
Ret	(Venezuela) Johnny Cecotto	Yamaha Motor Company	Yamaha	Retired	
Ret	(Italy) Graziano Rossi	Morbidelli	Morbidelli	Retired	
Ret	(United Kingdom) Rod Scivyer		Suzuki	Retired	
Ret	(Finland) Seppo Rossi	Kouv MK	Suzuki	Retired	
Ret	(United Kingdom) Tony Rutter	Harold Coppock	Suzuki	Retired	
Ret	(Japan) Ikujiro Takai	Yamaha Motor Company	Yamaha	Retired	
Ret	(Japan) Takazumi Katayama	Honda International Racing	Honda	Retired	
Ret	(Sweden) Lennart Backström		Suzuki	Retired	
Ret	(South Africa) Russell Wood		Yamaha	Retired	
Ret	(United Kingdom) Steve Parrish	Texaco Heron Team Suzuki	Suzuki	Accident	
Ret	(United Kingdom) Dave Potter	Team Mitsui Yamaha	Yamaha	Retired	
Ret	(United Kingdom) Mick Grant	Honda International Racing	Honda	Accident	
DNS	(Netherlands) Jack Middelburg		Suzuki	Did not start	

=== 350cc ===
Place	Rider	Number	Country	Machine	Time/Retired	Points
1	(South Africa) Kork Ballington	1	South Africa	Kawasaki	38min 9.91sec	15
2	(Australia) Gregg Hansford	15	Australia	Kawasaki		12
3	(Australia) Jeff Sayle	25	Australia	Yamaha		10
4	(Switzerland) Michel Frutschi	14	Switzerland	Yamaha		8
5	(Switzerland) Roland Freymond	24	Switzerland	Yamaha		6
6	(France) Michel Rougerie	55	France	Yamaha		5
7	(France) Olivier Chevallier	10	France	Chevallier-Yamaha		4
8	(United Kingdom) Tony Head	47	United Kingdom	Yamaha		3
9	(South Africa) Alan North	43	South Africa	Yamaha		2
10	(South Africa) Jon Ekerold	4	South Africa	Yamaha		1

=== 250cc ===
Place	Rider	Number	Country	Machine	Points
1	(South Africa) Kork Ballington	1	South Africa	Kawasaki	15
2	(United States) Randy Mamola	17	United States	Yamaha	12
3	(Germany) Anton Mang	5	West Germany	Kawasaki	10
4	(Australia) Graeme McGregor	35	Australia	Yamaha	8
5	(Switzerland) Roland Freymond	39	Switzerland	Yamaha	6
6	(France) Olivier Chevallier	20	France	Chevallier-Yamaha	5
7	(Austria) Edi Stoellinger	28	Austria	Yamaha	4
8	(France) Patrick Fernandez	2	France	Yamaha	3
9	(France) Christian Estrosi	12	France	Kawasaki	2
10	(United Kingdom) Tony Head	51	United Kingdom	Yamaha	1
11	(Finland) Eero Hyvarinen	38	Finland	Yamaha	
12	(France) Eric Saul	21	France	Bimota Adriatica Yamaha	
13	(Belgium) Rene Delaby	23	Belgium	Yamaha	

=== 125cc ===
Place	Rider	Number	Country	Machine	Points
1	(Spain) Angel Nieto	2	Spain	Minarelli	15
2	(Germany) Gert Bender	11	West Germany	Bender	12
3	(France) Guy Bertin	5	France	Motobécane	10
4	(Switzerland) Stefan Dörflinger	12	Switzerland	Morbidelli	8
5	(Italy) Pier Paolo Bianchi	3	Italy	Minarelli	6
6	(Italy) Maurizio Massimiami	6	Italy	MBA	5
7	(Switzerland) Hans Müller	7	Switzerland	MBA	4
8	(Austria) August Auinger	16	Austria	Morbidelli	3
9	(Switzerland) Bruno Kneubühler	17	Switzerland	MBA	2
10	(United Kingdom) Clive Horton	10	United Kingdom	Morbidelli	1

== B2A Sidecars Standings ==
Pos	Rider	Passenger	Number	Manufacturer	Time/Retired	Points
1	(Switzerland) Rolf Biland	(Switzerland) Kurt Waltisperg	1	Schmid-Yamaha	33min 39.47sec	15
2	(United Kingdom) Jock Taylor	(Sweden) Benga Johansson	7	Windle-Yamaha		12
3	(United Kingdom) Dick Greasley	(United Kingdom) John Parkins	5	Busch-Yamaha		10
4	(Germany) Werner Schwärzel	(Germany) Andreas Huber	4	Yamaha		8
5	(Germany) Rolf Steinhausen	(United Kingdom) Kenny Arthur	12	KSA-Yamaha		6
6	(Germany) Walter Ohrmann	(Germany) Erich Schmitz	27	Yamaha		5
7	(Germany) Siegfried Schauzu	(Germany) Lorenzo Puzo	13	Busch-Yamaha		4
8	(United Kingdom) John Barker	(United Kingdom) Nick Cutmore	28	Reynoldson-Yamaha		3
9	(Germany) Hermann Huber	(Germany) Bernhard Schappacher	14	Krauser-Yamaha		2
10	(Finland) Kalevi Rahko	(Finland) Kari Laatikainen	16	Yamaha		1

== B2B Sidecars Standings ==
Pos	Rider	Passenger	Manufacturer	Time/Retired	Points
1	(France) Alain Michel	(Germany) Michael Burkhard	Seymaz-Yamaha		15
2	(Switzerland) Bruno Holzer	(Sweden) Karl Meierhans	LCR-Yamaha		12
3	(Japan) Masato Kumano	(Japan) Isao Arifuku	Yamaha		10
4	(Germany) Heinz Luthringshauser	(Germany) Karl Paul	Yamaha		8
5	(France) Yvan Trolliet	(France) Marc Petel	Seymaz-Yamaha		6
6	(France) Bernard Chabert	(France) Patrice Daire	CB-Yamaha		5
7	(Netherlands) Cees Smit	(Netherlands) Charles Vroegop	Seymaz-Yamaha		4
8	(Austria) Klaus Sprengel	(United Kingdom) Derek John Booth	Suzuki		3
9	(United Kingdom) Steve Sinnott	(United Kingdom) John Horspole	?-Yamaha		2
10	(Germany) Rudolf Reinhard	(Germany) Karin Sterzenbach	GEP-Yamaha		1

Previous race: 1979 Finnish Grand Prix	FIM Grand Prix World Championship; 1979 season	Next race: 1979 Czechoslovak Grand Prix
Previous race: 1978 British Grand Prix	British Grand Prix	Next race: 1980 British Grand Prix
