= 1979 Dutch TT =

(Netherlands) 1979 Dutch TT
Race details
- Race 7 of 13 races in the 1979 Grand Prix motorcycle racing season
- Date: 23 June 1979
- Official name: Dutch TT 1979
- Location: TT Circuit Assen
- Course: Permanent racing facility; 6.049 km (3.759 mi)

500cc
Pole position
- Rider: (United States) Kenny Roberts
- Time: 2:55.900
Fastest lap
- Rider: (Italy) Virginio Ferrari
- Time: 2:54.500
Podium
- First: (Italy) Virginio Ferrari
- Second: (United Kingdom) Barry Sheene
- Third: (Netherlands) Wil Hartog

350cc
Pole position
- Rider: (Australia) Gregg Hansford
Fastest lap
- Rider: (Australia) Gregg Hansford
Podium
- First: (Australia) Gregg Hansford
- Second: (France) Patrick Fernandez
- Third: (Italy) Walter Villa

250cc
Pole position
- Rider: (South Africa) Kork Ballington
- Time: 3:05.600
Fastest lap
- Rider: (South Africa) Kork Ballington
- Time: 3:02.800
Podium
- First: (Italy) Graziano Rossi
- Second: (Australia) Gregg Hansford
- Third: (South Africa) Kork Ballington

125cc
Pole position
- Rider: (Switzerland) Bruno Kneubühler
- Time: 3:14.400
Fastest lap
- Rider: (Spain) Ángel Nieto
- Time: 3:13.200
Podium
- First: (Spain) Ángel Nieto
- Second: (Spain) Ricardo Tormo
- Third: (Italy) Maurizio Massimiani

50cc
Pole position
- Rider: (Spain) Ricardo Tormo
Fastest lap
- Rider: (Italy) Eugenio Lazzarini
Podium
- First: (Italy) Eugenio Lazzarini
- Second: (France) Patrick Plisson
- Third: (Switzerland) Rolf Blatter

The 1979 Dutch TT was the seventh round of the 1979 Grand Prix motorcycle racing season. It took place on the weekend of 21–23 June 1979 at the TT Circuit Assen located in Assen, Netherlands.

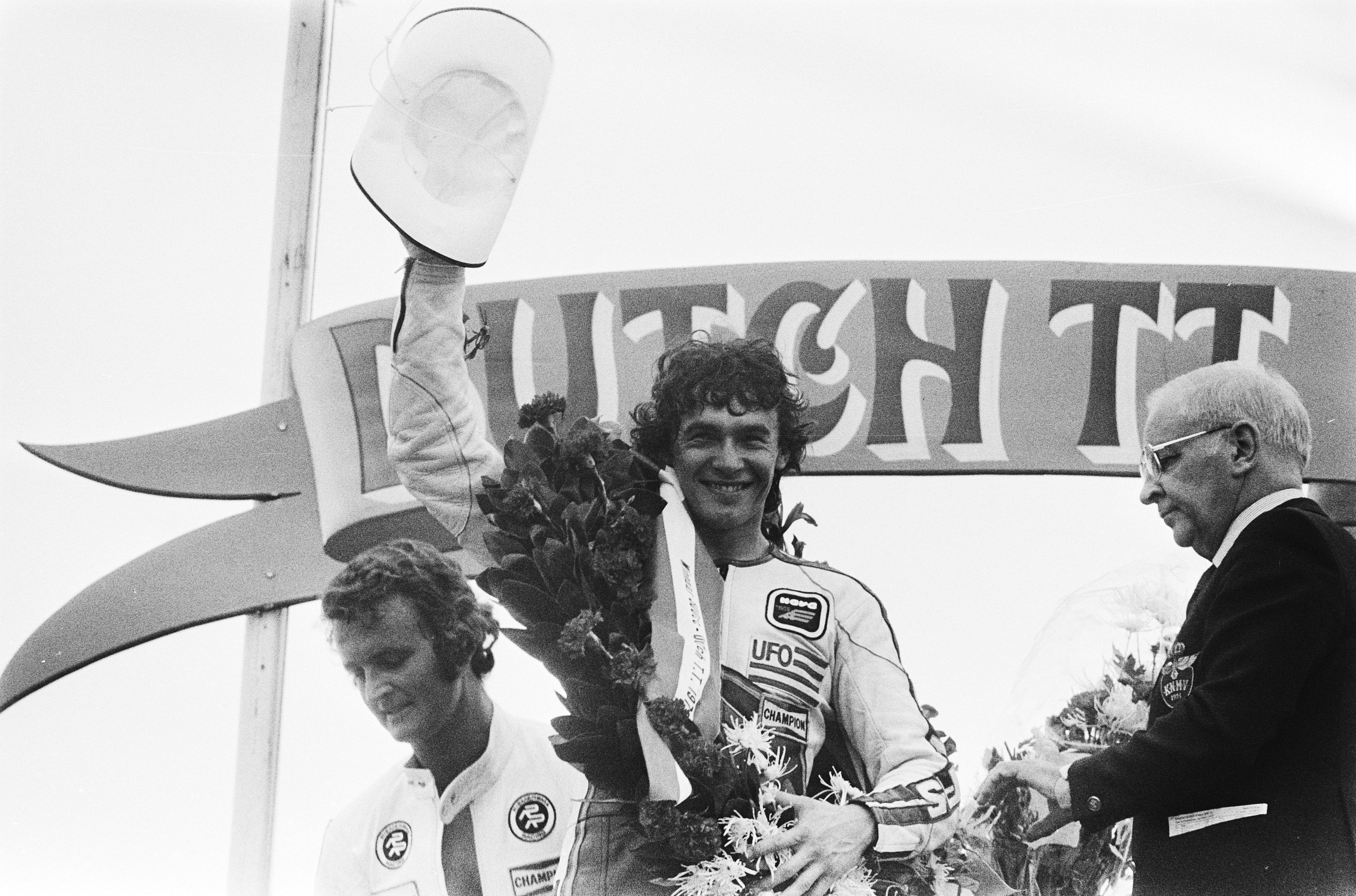
Virginio Ferrari and Wil Hartog, celebrating on the podium after finishing first and third at the 500cc race.

== Classification ==
=== 500 cc ===
Pos.	Rider	Team	Manufacturer	Time/Retired	Points
1	(Italy) Virginio Ferrari	Team Gallina Nava Olio Fiat	Suzuki	47'07.300	15
2	(United Kingdom) Barry Sheene	Texaco Heron Team Suzuki	Suzuki	+0.100	12
3	(Netherlands) Wil Hartog	Riemersma Racing	Suzuki	+21.400	10
4	(Netherlands) Boet van Dulmen		Suzuki	+27.200	8
5	(Switzerland) Philippe Coulon		Suzuki	+47.030	6
6	(Italy) Franco Uncini	Team Zago International	Suzuki	+1 lap	5
7	(Netherlands) Jack Middelburg		Suzuki	+1 lap	4
8	(United States) Kenny Roberts	Yamaha Motor Company	Yamaha	+1 lap	3
9	(France) Christian Sarron	Team Sonauto Gauloises	Yamaha	+1 lap	2
10	(United Kingdom) Steve Parrish	Texaco Heron Team Suzuki	Suzuki	+1 lap	1
11	(Italy) Gianni Rolando	Scuderia Naldoni	Suzuki	+1 lap	
12	(Italy) Graziano Rossi	Morbidelli	Morbidelli	+1 lap	
13	(United States) Randy Mamola	Serge Zago	Suzuki	+1 lap	
14	(Japan) Ikujiro Takai	Yamaha Motor Company	Yamaha	+1 lap	
15	(New Zealand) Dennis Ireland	Derry's Racing	Suzuki	+1 lap	
16	(Netherlands) Dick Alblas		Suzuki	+1 lap	
17	(West Germany) Gerhard Vogt	Bill Smith Racing	Suzuki	+1 lap	
Ret	(Finland) Seppo Rossi	Kouv MK	Suzuki	Retired	
Ret	(Venezuela) Johnny Cecotto	Yamaha Motor Company	Yamaha	Retired	
Ret	(France) Bernard Fau	Suzuki France	Suzuki	Retired	
Ret	(Netherlands) Henk de Vries	Team 77	Suzuki	Retired	
Ret	(Italy) Marco Lucchinelli		Suzuki	Retired	
Ret	(Austria) Max Wiener		Suzuki	Accident	
Ret	(West Germany) Jürgen Steiner	Suzuki Deutschland	Suzuki	Accident	
Ret	(Denmark) Børge Nielsen		Suzuki	Accident	
Ret	(France) Michel Rougerie		Suzuki	Retired	
Ret	(Sweden) Peter Sjöström	Ava MC Stockholm	Suzuki	Retired	
Ret	(Netherlands) Piet van der Wal		Yamaha	Retired	
Ret	(Netherlands) Willem Zoet	Stimorol Racing	Suzuki	Retired	
DNQ	(United Kingdom) Dave Potter	Ted Broad	Suzuki	Did not qualify	
DNQ	(West Germany) Gustav Reiner	Dieter Braun Team	Suzuki	Did not qualify	

Previous race: 1979 Yugoslavian Grand Prix	FIM Grand Prix World Championship; 1979 season	Next race: 1979 Belgian Grand Prix
Previous race: 1978 Dutch TT	Dutch TT	Next race: 1980 Dutch TT
