= 1979 Grand Prix motorcycle racing season =

Sports season

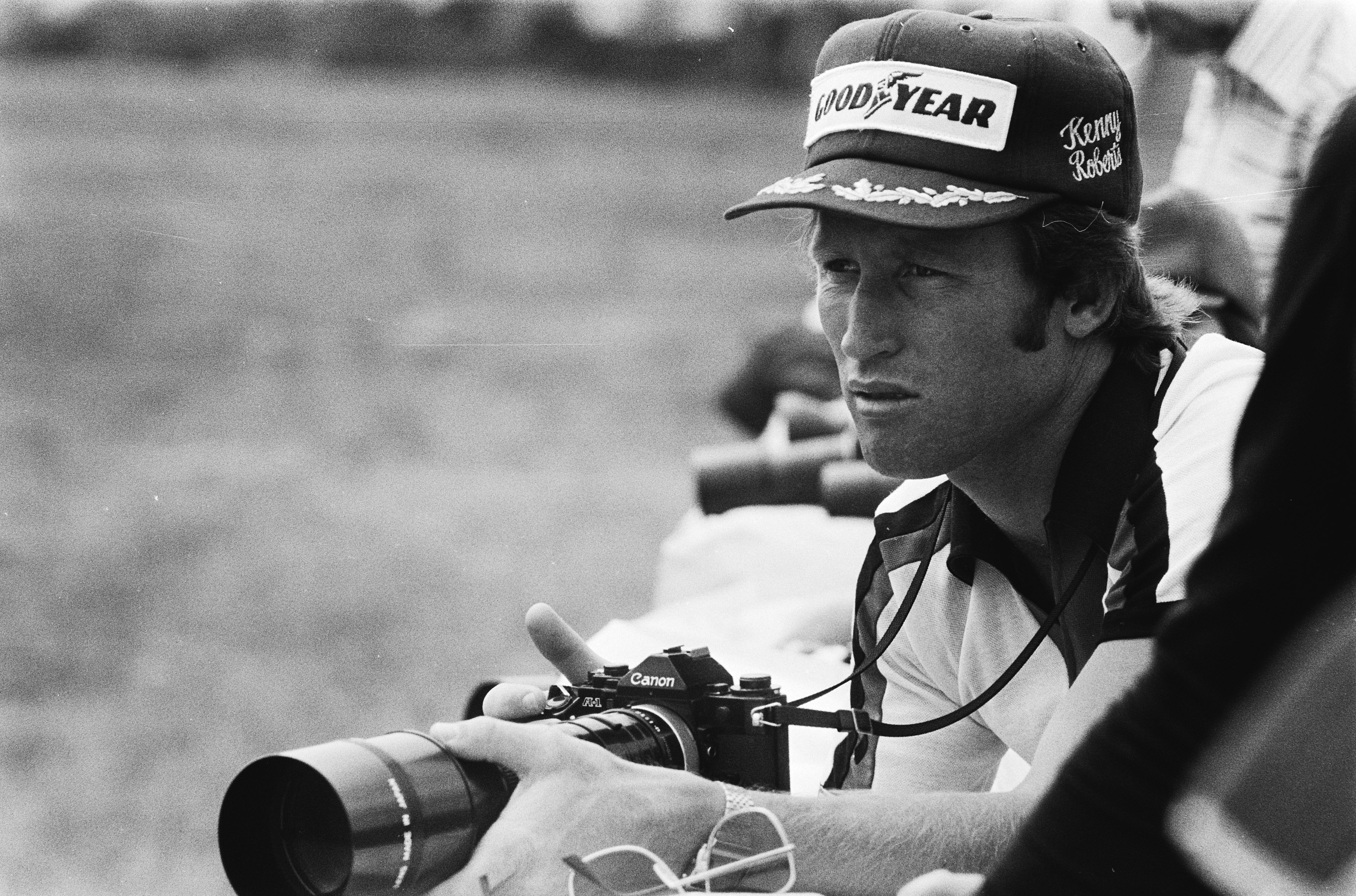
Kenny Roberts (pictured in Assen) became the 1979 500cc world champion

The 1979 Grand Prix motorcycle racing season was the 31st F.I.M. Road Racing World Championship season.

== Season summary ==
A season of changing fortunes in the 500cc class saw American, Kenny Roberts capture his second crown in the face of the Suzuki-mounted opposition. In the 50cc class, Eugenio Lazzarini won every race in which he finished to take the championship. Angel Nieto dominated on a Minarelli to take his seventh world championship. Kork Ballington would repeat as double world champion in the 250cc and 350cc classes for Kawasaki.

Defending champion Roberts was injured in a pre-season test but came back to win round two in impressive fashion. His rivals also suffered from bad luck. Hartog breaking his arm in practice, Cecotto badly breaking his kneecap in Austria and Sheene suffering from mechanical failures. The 1979 British Grand Prix would be remembered as one of the greatest races of the modern era with Roberts beating Sheene to the finish line by three-hundredths of a second.

After an eleven-year absence from world championship racing, Honda returned to competition with the exotic, four-stroke NR500 ridden by riders Mick Grant and Takazumi Katayama at the British Grand Prix. The motorcycle featured an engine with oval-shaped cylinders as well as a monocoque chassis. Both bikes retired from the race, Grant crashing out on the first turn after the bike spilled oil onto his rear tire. Katayama retired on the seventh lap due to ignition problems.

The top riders boycotted the Belgian Grand Prix over safety issues showing their increasing dissatisfaction with the way the FIM conducted races. After several safety issues, the top riders banded together near the end of the year to announce that they would create a competing championship called the World Series. Although the series never got off the ground, the riders had flexed their political muscles and it forced the FIM to change the way they dealt with races and the riders themselves. The FIM announced an increase in prize money for the following year. This would mark the beginning of an era of increased professionalism in the sport.

== 1979 Grand Prix season calendar ==
Round	Date	Race	Location	50cc winner	125cc winner	250cc winner	350cc winner	500cc winner	Report
1	March 18	(Venezuela) Venezuelan Grand Prix	San Carlos		(Spain) Angel Nieto	(Italy) Walter Villa	(Venezuela) Carlos Lavado	(United Kingdom) Barry Sheene	Report
2	April 29	(Austria) Austrian Grand Prix	Salzburgring		(Spain) Angel Nieto		(South Africa) Kork Ballington	(United States) Kenny Roberts	Report
3	May 6	(Germany) German Grand Prix	Hockenheimring	(Germany) Gerhard Waibel	(Spain) Angel Nieto	(South Africa) Kork Ballington	(South Africa) Jon Ekerold	(Netherlands) Wil Hartog	Report
4	May 13	(Italy) Nations Grand Prix	Imola	(Italy) Eugenio Lazzarini	(Spain) Angel Nieto	(South Africa) Kork Ballington	(Australia) Gregg Hansford	(United States) Kenny Roberts	Report
5	May 20	(Spain) Spanish Grand Prix	Jarama	(Italy) Eugenio Lazzarini	(Spain) Angel Nieto	(South Africa) Kork Ballington	(South Africa) Kork Ballington	(United States) Kenny Roberts	Report
6	June 10	(Socialist Federal Republic of Yugoslavia) Yugoslavian Grand Prix	Rijeka	(Italy) Eugenio Lazzarini	(Spain) Angel Nieto	(Italy) Graziano Rossi	(South Africa) Kork Ballington	(United States) Kenny Roberts	Report
7	June 23	(Netherlands) Dutch TT	Assen	(Italy) Eugenio Lazzarini	(Spain) Angel Nieto	(Italy) Graziano Rossi	(Australia) Gregg Hansford	(Italy) Virginio Ferrari	Report
8	July 1	(Belgium) Belgian Grand Prix	Spa-Francorchamps	(Netherlands) Henk van Kessel	(Australia) Barry Smith	(Austria) Edi Stoellinger		(New Zealand) Dennis Ireland	Report
9	July 22	(Sweden) Swedish Grand Prix	Karlskoga		(Italy) Pier Paolo Bianchi	(Italy) Graziano Rossi		(United Kingdom) Barry Sheene	Report
10	July 29	(Finland) Finnish Grand Prix	Imatra		(Spain) Ricardo Tormo	(South Africa) Kork Ballington	(Australia) Gregg Hansford	(Netherlands) Boet van Dulmen	Report
11	August 12	(United Kingdom) British Grand Prix	Silverstone		(Spain) Angel Nieto	(South Africa) Kork Ballington	(South Africa) Kork Ballington	(United States) Kenny Roberts	Report
12	August 19	(Czechoslovakia) Czechoslovak Grand Prix	Brno		(France) Guy Bertin	(South Africa) Kork Ballington	(South Africa) Kork Ballington		Report
13	September 2	(France) French Grand Prix	Le Mans	(Italy) Eugenio Lazzarini	(France) Guy Bertin	(South Africa) Kork Ballington	(France) Patrick Fernandez	(United Kingdom) Barry Sheene	Report

== Final standings ==
=== Scoring system ===
Points were awarded to the top ten finishers in each race. All races counted towards the final standings.

(key)

Position	1st	2nd	3rd	4th	5th	6th	7th	8th	9th	10th
Points	15	12	10	8	6	5	4	3	2	1

==== 500cc final standings ====
Place	Rider	Team	Machine	VEN (Venezuela)	AUT (Austria)	GER (West Germany)	NAT (Italy)	ESP (Spain)	YUG (Socialist Federal Republic of Yugoslavia)	NED (Netherlands)	BEL (Belgium)	SWE (Sweden)	FIN (Finland)	GBR (United Kingdom)	FRA (France)	Points
1	(United States) Kenny Roberts	Yamaha USA	YZR500		1	2	1	1	1	8	DNS	4	6	1	3	113
2	(Italy) Virginio Ferrari	Team Gallina Nava Olio Fiat	RG500	2	2	3	2	4	2	1	DNS	Ret	15	4	Ret	89
3	(United Kingdom) Barry Sheene	Heron-Suzuki	RG500	1	12	Ret	4	Ret	Ret	2	DNS	1	3	2	1	87
4	(Netherlands) Wil Hartog	Riemersma Racing	RG500	Ret	3	1	Ret	2	4	3	DNS	Ret	10	3	18	66
5	(Italy) Franco Uncini	Team Zago International	RG500	4	6	6	Ret	5	3	6	DNS	Ret	Ret	7	4	51
6	(Netherlands) Boet van Dulmen	IMN Yamaha	YZR500		Ret	Ret	Ret	6	5	4	DNS	3	1	5	Ret	50
7	(Netherlands) Jack Middelburg	Racing Westland Suzuki	RG500		15	7	7	7	Ret	7	DNS	2	4	DNS		42
8	(Switzerland) Philippe Coulon	Frankonia Suzuki	RG500		Ret	5	8	8	Ret	5	DNS	Ret	8	8	6	29
8	(United States) Randy Mamola	Team Zago International	RG500							13	DNS	6	2	Ret	2	29
10	(United Kingdom) Tom Herron	Heron-Suzuki	RG500	3	4	Ret	3	DNS								28
11	(France) Christian Sarron	Sonauto Gauloises-Yamaha	YZR500	7		8	Ret		7	9	DNS	9	5	6		26
12	(United Kingdom) Steve Parrish	Heron-Suzuki	RG500	Ret	7	9	11	11	9	10	DNS	5	11	Ret	7	19
13	(New Zealand) Dennis Ireland	Derry's Racing	RG500	10	18	11	Ret		17	15	1	Ret	Ret	Ret	Ret	17
13	(United States) Mike Baldwin	Team Zago International	RG500		14	10	5	3								17
14	(France) Michel Rougerie	Ecurie Ste Pernod	RG500	5				9	6		DNS				8	16
15	(France) Bernard Fau	Suzuki-France	RG500		11	4	6	Ret		Ret						13
17	(Australia) Kenny Blake		YZR500								2				DNQ	12
17	(Australia) Kenny Blake		RG500									Ret				12
18	(Italy) Marco Lucchinelli		RG500		9	Ret	Ret	10	Ret	Ret	DNS	7	9	9	Ret	11
19	(Venezuela) Johnny Cecotto	Venemotos-Yamaha	YZR500	Ret	Ret				Ret	Ret	DNS	Ret	7	Ret	5	10
19	(United Kingdom) Gary Lingham		RG500								3		Ret		DNQ	10
21	(West Germany) Gustav Reiner	Dieter Braun Racing	RG500		20	Ret		Ret		DNQ	4	Ret	Ret		Ret	8
22	(Japan) Hiroyuki Kawasaki	Heron-Suzuki	RG500		5	Ret	DNS	Ret								6
22	(Netherlands) Henk De Vries	Team 77	RG500			13		13		Ret	5			18	12	6
22	(West Germany) Gerhard Vogt	Bill Smith Racing	RG500	8	Ret	14		14		17	8		14	Ret	16	6
25	(Venezuela) Roberto Pietri	Venemotos Yamaha	RG500	6										Ret	15	5
25	(West Germany) Josef Hage	Dieter Braun Racing	RG500								6					5
27	(Belgium) Jacky Matagne		RG500								7					4
27	(Austria) Max Wiener		RG500		8				10			DNQ	Ret	16	Ret	4
29	(Japan) Ikujiro Takai	Yamaha International	YZR500						Ret	14	DNS	8	Ret	Ret		3
29	(Italy) Carlo Perugini		RG500		Ret	Ret	Ret		8		Ret			11	Ret	3
31	(Switzerland) Sergio Pellandini		RG500	9											Ret	2
31	(Belgium) Guy Cooremans		RG500								9					2
31	(Italy) Graziano Rossi	Morbidelli	Morbidelli 500-4			Ret	9	Ret	Ret	12	DNS	Ret	Ret	Ret	Ret	2
31	(United Kingdom) John Woodley		RG500												9	2
35	(Sweden) Peter Sjöström	Ava MC Stockholm	RG500		17	DNS	DNQ	Ret	14	Ret	Ret		13	13	10	1
35	(Finland) Seppo Rossi	Kouv MK	RG500		22		15	Ret	12	Ret	DNS	10	Ret	Ret	11	1
35	(Italy) Gianni Pelletier		RG500	Ret		Ret	10	12	15		DNS			Ret	Ret	1
35	(United Kingdom) Mick Grant		RG500	Ret	10	Ret										1
35	(United Kingdom) Mick Grant	Honda-HRC	NR500											Ret	DNQ	1
35	(Belgium) Dieter Heinen		RG500								10					1
35	(United Kingdom) John Newbold	Team Appleby Glade	RG500											10		1

=== 350cc standings ===
Place	Rider	Number	Country	Machine	Points	Wins
1	(South Africa) Kork Ballington	1	South Africa	Kawasaki	99	5
2	(France) Patrick Fernandez		France	Yamaha	90	1
3	(Australia) Gregg Hansford	3	Australia	Kawasaki	77	3
4	(West Germany) Anton Mang	16	West Germany	Kawasaki	64	0
5	(Switzerland) Michel Frutschi		Switzerland	Yamaha	47	0
6	(France) Michel Rougerie	6	France	Yamaha	47	0
7	(Switzerland) Roland Freymond	27	Switzerland	Yamaha	40	0
8	(South Africa) Jon Ekerold	4	South Africa	Yamaha	34	1
9	(Japan) Sadao Asami		Japan	Yamaha	27	0
10	(Australia) Jeff Sayle		Australia	Yamaha	24	0
11	Pekka Nurmi				23	
12	Penti Korhonen				17	
13	Christian Estrosi				16	
14	Carlos Lavado				15	
15	Patrick Pons				12	
16	Eric Saul				10	
17	Michel Rougerie				10	
18	Richard Hubin				9	
19	Herve Guilleux				8	
20	Olivier Chevallier				8	
21	Victor Soussan				8	
22	Graeme McGregor				5	
23	M.Sayle				5	
24	E.Elias				4	
25	B.Elgh				4	
26	Paolo Pileri				4	
27	Edi Stoellinger				4	
28	Reinhold Roth				3	
29	Tony Head				3	
30	K.Hernamdt				3	
31	Victor Palomo				3	
32	Eero Hyvärinen				3	
33	Alan North				3	
34	A.Faccioli				2	
35	Joey Dunlop				2	
36	Y.Matsumoto				2	
37	Gianfranco Bonera				2	
38	Max Wiener				1	

=== 250cc standings ===
Place	Rider	Number	Country	Machine	Points	Wins
1	(South Africa) Kork Ballington	1	South Africa	Kawasaki	141	7
2	(Australia) Gregg Hansford	2	Australia	Kawasaki	81	0
3	(Italy) Graziano Rossi		Italy	Morbidelli	67	3
4	(United States) Randy Mamola		United States	Yamaha	64	0
5	(France) Patrick Fernandez	3	France	Yamaha	63	0
6	(West Germany) Anton Mang	5	West Germany	Kawasaki	56	0
7	(Italy) Walter Villa	16	Italy	Yamaha	39	1
8	(France) Jean-François Baldé	13	France	Kawasaki	29	0
9	(Austria) Edi Stoellinger		Austria	Kawasaki	28	1
10	(Switzerland) Roland Freymond	22	Switzerland	Yamaha	22	0
11	Olivier Chevallier				22	
12	Christian Estrosi				19	
13	Chas Mortimer				14	
14	Paolo Pileri				14	
15	Graeme McGregor				14	
16	Barry Ditchburn				13	
17	Victor Soussan				11	
18	Eric Saul				11	
19	M.Sayle				10	
20	Fernando Gonzales de N.				9	
21	Penti Korhonen				9	
22	Jon Ekerold				8	
23	Richard Hubin				7	
24	Guy Bertin				6	
25	Michel Simeon				5	
26	Jeffrey Sayle				4	
27	Hans Müller				4	
28	Massimo Matteoni				3	
29	Maurizio Massimiani				3	
30	Pekka Nurmi				3	
31	J.Lazo				3	
32	B.Elgh				2	
33	Y.Matsumoto				2	
34	Eero Hyvärinen				1	
35	Tony Head				1	
36	Sadao Asami				1	
37	Thierry Espié				1	
38	Alan North				1	
39	Rinus Van Kasteren				1	

=== 125cc standings ===
Place	Rider	Number	Country	Machine	Points	Wins
1	(Spain) Angel Nieto	2	Spain	Minarelli	120	8
2	(Italy) Maurizio Massimiani	6	Italy	MBA	53	0
3	(Switzerland) Hans Müller	7	Switzerland	MBA	50	0
4	(France) Thierry Espié	5	France	Motobécane	48	0
5	(West Germany) Gert Bender		West Germany	GB Bender	47	0
6	(France) Guy Bertin		France	Motobécane	40	2
7	(Spain) Ricardo Tormo	8	Spain	Bultaco	39	1
8	(Austria) Harald Bartol	4	Austria	Morbidelli	36	0
9	(Switzerland) Bruno Kneubühler		Switzerland	MBA	36	0
10	(Italy) Pier Paolo Bianchi	3	Italy	Minarelli	35	1
11	Stefan Dorflinger				35	
12	Barry Smith					
13	Walter Koschine				25	
14	August Auinger				25	
15	Eugenio Lazzarini				22	
16	Jean Louis Guignabodet				20	
17	Matti Kinnunen				19	
18	Patrick Herouard				18	
19	Marcelino Garcia				17	
20	Thierry Noblesse				16	
21	Per Edvard Carlsson				14	
22	Jean Francois Lecureux				12	
23	Patrick Plisson				12	
24	Martin Van Soest				10	
25	Gianpaolo Marchetti				10	
26	Rolf Blatter				8	
27	Peter Looijesteijn				8	
28	Clive Horton				7	
29	Francois Granon				7	
30	Stefan Janssen				7	
31	Ivan Troisi				5	
32	Paul Bordes				5	
33	Pierluigi Conforti				4	
34	Anton Straver				4	
35	Peter Balaz				3	
36	Jean Paul Magnoni				2	
37	Alfred Waibel				2	
38	Stefano Ferretti				2	
39	Henk van Kessel				2	
40	Jan Huberts				2	
41	Marc Antoine Constantin				2	
42	Miguel Cortes				1	
43	Fernando Gonzales de N.				1	
44	Renè Renier				1	
45	Johnny Wickstroem				1	

=== 50cc standings ===
Place	Rider	Number	Country	Machine	Points	Wins
1	(Italy) Eugenio Lazzarini	2	Italy	Kreidler	75	5
2	(Switzerland) Rolf Blatter	5	Switzerland	Kreidler	62	0
3	(France) Patrick Plisson	3	France	ABF	32	0
4	(West Germany) Gerhard Waibel		West Germany	Kreidler	31	1
5	(Netherlands) Peter Looijensteijn	8	Netherlands	Kreidler	30	0
6	(West Germany) Hagen Klein	17	West Germany	Kreidler	26	0
7	(Netherlands) Henk van Kessel	12	Netherlands	Sparta	23	1
8	(France) Jacques Hutteau		France	Kreidler	27	0
9	(West Germany) Ingo Emmerich		West Germany	Kreidler	8	0
10	(Switzerland) Stefan Dörflinger		Switzerland	Kreidler	6	0
11	Rainer Scheidhauer				17	
12	Theo Timmer				16	
13	Aldo Pero				16	
14	Rudolf Kunz				13	
15	E.Saffioti				10	
16	Wolfgang Müller				9	
17	Ricardo Tormo				6	
18	Enrico Cereda				5	
19	Joaquim Gali				5	
20	Daniel Mateos				4	
21	M.Servadio				4	
22	Graham Singer				4	
23	P.Verbic				3	
24	Theo Van Geffen				3	
25	R.Oosting				2	
26	Claudio Granata				2	
27	Hans Hummel				2	
28	Cees Van Dongen				1	
29	D.Priori				1	
30	Gerrit Strikker				1	
