= 1979 Yugoslavian motorcycle Grand Prix =

(Socialist Federal Republic of Yugoslavia) 1979 Yugoslavian Grand Prix
Race details
- Race 6 of 13 races in the 1979 Grand Prix motorcycle racing season
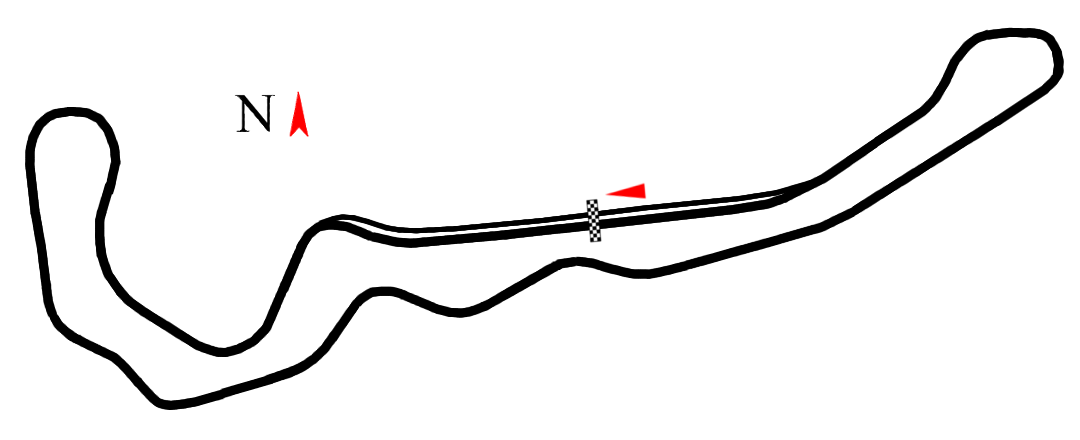
- Date: 17 June 1979
- Official name: Velika Nagrada Jugoslavije
- Location: Automotodrom Rijeka
- Course: Permanent racing facility; 4.168 km (2.590 mi)

500cc
Pole position
- Rider: (United States) Kenny Roberts
- Time: 1:50.600
Fastest lap
- Rider: Unknown
Podium
- First: (United States) Kenny Roberts
- Second: (Italy) Virginio Ferrari
- Third: (Italy) Franco Uncini

350cc
Pole position
- Rider: (Australia) Gregg Hansford
- Time: 1:38.500
Fastest lap
- Rider: Unknown
Podium
- First: (South Africa) Kork Ballington
- Second: (Finland) Pekka Nurmi
- Third: (Japan) Sadao Asami

250cc
Pole position
- Rider: (Australia) Gregg Hansford
- Time: 1:40.700
Fastest lap
- Rider: Unknown
Podium
- First: (Italy) Graziano Rossi
- Second: (Australia) Gregg Hansford
- Third: (France) Patrick Fernandez

125cc
Pole position
- Rider: (Spain) Ricardo Tormo
- Time: 1:53.700
Fastest lap
- Rider: Unknown
Podium
- First: (Spain) Ángel Nieto
- Second: (France) Thierry Espié
- Third: (Switzerland) Stefan Dörflinger

50cc
Pole position
- Rider: (Italy) Eugenio Lazzarini
- Time: 1:54.300
Fastest lap
- Rider: Unknown
Podium
- First: (Italy) Eugenio Lazzarini
- Second: (Switzerland) Rolf Blatter
- Third: (West Germany) Hagen Klein

The 1979 Yugoslavian motorcycle Grand Prix was the sixth round of the 1979 Grand Prix motorcycle racing season. It took place on the weekend of 15–17 June 1979 at the Automotodrom Rijeka.

== Classification ==
=== 500 cc ===
Pos.	Rider	Team	Manufacturer	Time/Retired	Points
1	(United States) Kenny Roberts	Yamaha Motor Company	Yamaha	51'27.280	15
2	(Italy) Virginio Ferrari	Team Gallina Nava Olio Fiat	Suzuki	+3.420	12
3	(Italy) Franco Uncini	Team Zago International	Suzuki	+42.440	10
4	(Netherlands) Wil Hartog	Riemersma Racing	Suzuki	+42.580	8
5	(Netherlands) Boet van Dulmen		Suzuki	+47.030	6
6	(France) Michel Rougerie		Suzuki	+1 lap	5
7	(France) Christian Sarron	Team Sonauto Gauloises	Yamaha	+1 lap	4
8	(Italy) Carlo Perugini		Suzuki	+1 lap	3
9	(United Kingdom) Steve Parrish	Texaco Heron Team Suzuki	Suzuki	+1 lap	2
10	(Austria) Max Wiener		Suzuki	+1 lap	1
11	(France) Franck Gross		Suzuki	+1 lap	
12	(Finland) Seppo Rossi	Kouv MK	Suzuki	+1 lap	
13	(Netherlands) Willem Zoet	Stimorol Racing	Suzuki	+1 lap	
14	(Sweden) Peter Sjöström	Ava MC Stockholm	Suzuki	+1 lap	
15	(Italy) Gianni Pelletier		Suzuki	+2 laps	
16	(Italy) Raffaele Pasqual		Suzuki	+2 laps	
17	(New Zealand) Dennis Ireland	Derry's Racing	Suzuki	+2 laps	
18	(Italy) Sergio Pellandini		Suzuki	+2 laps	
19	(Belgium) Didier de Radiguès		Suzuki	+2 laps	
20	(West Germany) Jochen Schmid		Suzuki	+3 laps	
21	(Spain) Carlos Delgado de San Antonio		Suzuki	+3 laps	
Ret	(Italy) Gianni Rolando	Scuderia Naldoni	Suzuki	Retired	
Ret	(Venezuela) Johnny Cecotto	Yamaha Motor Company	Yamaha	Retired	
Ret	(Japan) Ikujiro Takai	Yamaha Motor Company	Yamaha	Retired	
Ret	(Italy) Pierluigi Rimoldi		Paton	Retired	
Ret	(Italy) Marco Lucchinelli		Suzuki	Retired	
Ret	(Switzerland) Philippe Coulon		Suzuki	Retired	
Ret	(Netherlands) Jack Middelburg		Suzuki	Retired	
Ret	(Austria) Werner Nenning	Mobel Nenning Racing Team	Suzuki	Retired	
Ret	(Italy) Graziano Rossi	Morbidelli	Morbidelli	Retired	
Ret	(Italy) Carlo Prati		Suzuki	Retired	
Ret	(United Kingdom) Barry Sheene	Texaco Heron Team Suzuki	Suzuki	Retired	
Ret	(Denmark) Børge Nielsen		Suzuki	Retired	
DNS	(Spain) Toni Garcia		Suzuki	Did not start	

Previous race: 1979 Spanish Grand Prix	FIM Grand Prix World Championship; 1979 season	Next race: 1979 Dutch TT
Previous race: 1978 Yugoslavian Grand Prix	Yugoslavian Grand Prix	Next race: 1980 Yugoslavian Grand Prix
