= Mick Grant =

British motorcycle racer

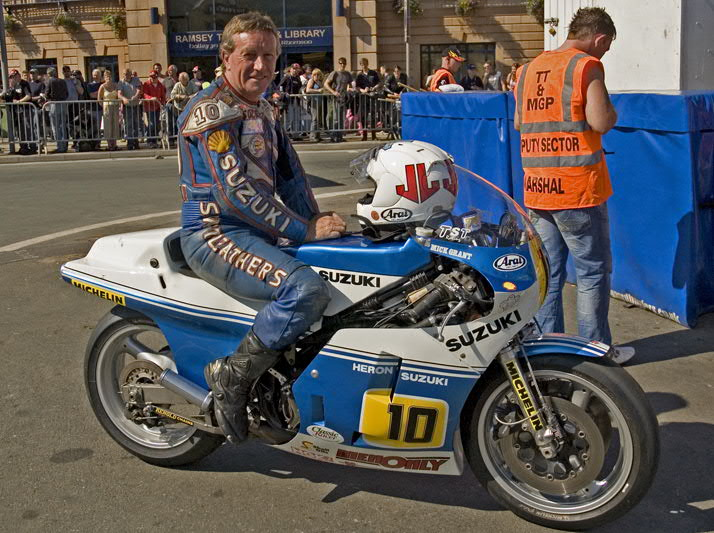
- Mick Grant at Parliament Square, Ramsey, Isle of Man demonstrating a 1980s Suzuki during a Classic Parade in 2007
- Nationality: British
- Born: 10 July 1944 (age 82); Wakefield, England
Motorcycle racing career statistics
Grand Prix motorcycle racing
Active years	1970–1984
First race	1970 350cc Isle of Man TT
Last race	1984 500cc British Grand Prix
First win	1975 500cc Isle of Man TT
Last win	1977 250cc Swedish Grand Prix
Team(s)	Kawasaki, Honda
Starts / Wins / Podiums / Poles / F. laps / Points; 25 / 3 / 9 / 1 / 4 / 143
Isle of Man TT career
TTs contested	16 (1970–1985)
TT wins	7 (1974, 1975, 1977, 1980, 1981, 1983, 1985)
First TT win	1974 Production TT 1000cc
Last TT win	1985 Production TT 750cc
TT podiums	16

Michael Grant (born 10 July 1944) is an English former professional motorcycle road racer and TT rider. A works-supported rider for Norton, Kawasaki, Honda and Suzuki, he is a seven-time winner of the Isle of Man TT motorcycle race on various makes, including 'Slippery Sam', a three-cylinder Triumph Trident. The son of a coal miner, the soft-spoken, down-to-earth Yorkshireman from Wakefield, was a sharp contrast to the brash, playboy image presented by Londoner Barry Sheene during the 1970s.

== Race career ==
Grant began his racing career as a privateer, entering his first Manx Grand Prix in 1969 on a Velocette 500 cc, and his first TT in the following year, again using the Velocette and placing 18th in the Junior (350 cc) class on a Lee-sponsored Yamaha TD2.

Later supported by businesses including Clive Padgett, heading Padgetts of Batley, on TD2 250 cc and TR2 350 cc Yamahas, and Brian Davidson of John Davidson Group on TZ Yamahas, Grant was equally versatile on either two- or four-stroke machines.

Grant quickly became a works Norton rider alongside Peter Williams and Phil Read, part of the first Norton factory team since the Norton race-shop was disbanded in 1962, headed by ex-racer Frank Perris. In 1972, he teamed with Dave Croxford to win the Thruxton 500 endurance race on a 745 cc Norton Commando, and finished second to Williams in the 1973 F750 TT.

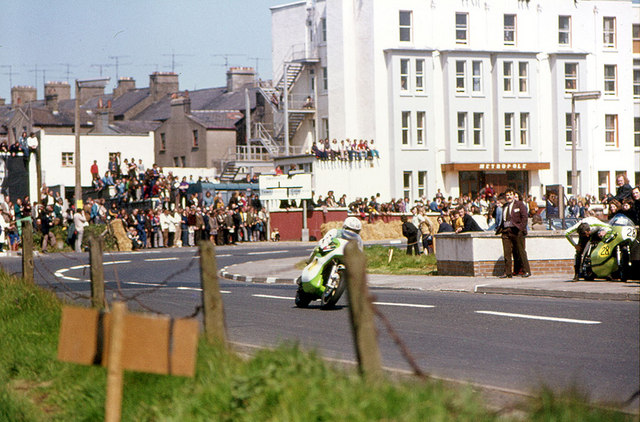
Grant racing in the 1975 North West 200 in Portrush.

In late 1974, Grant was the chosen rider for the then-new, UK-based Boyer Kawasaki Racing Team, based on two air-cooled triples. Stan Shenton, head of motorcycle business Boyer of Bromley, previously having a long background of racing Triumphs, was Team principal. They were one of a selected network of regional Kawasaki dealers, part of a controlled expansion and roll-out to establish a UK dealer-network. As part of the development process, Grant's racing included Ontario, California in late 1974.

In 1975, Grant completed the first-ever 120 mph lap of the North West 200 circuit. Also in 1975, it was Grant who finally broke Mike Hailwood's absolute TT lap record for the Isle of Man Snaefell mountain course, set in 1967 on a 500 Honda, raising the average-speed of one lap to 109.82 mph on a Kawasaki KR750 two-stroke triple entered by the Boyer team and Stan Shenton. Although Grant failed to finish the race, retiring at the Gooseneck with a broken chain caused by a mis-aligned rear wheel spindle, he won the 500 cc Senior TT race. In 1977, Grant raised the lap record to 112.77 mph, again on a 750 cc Kawasaki.

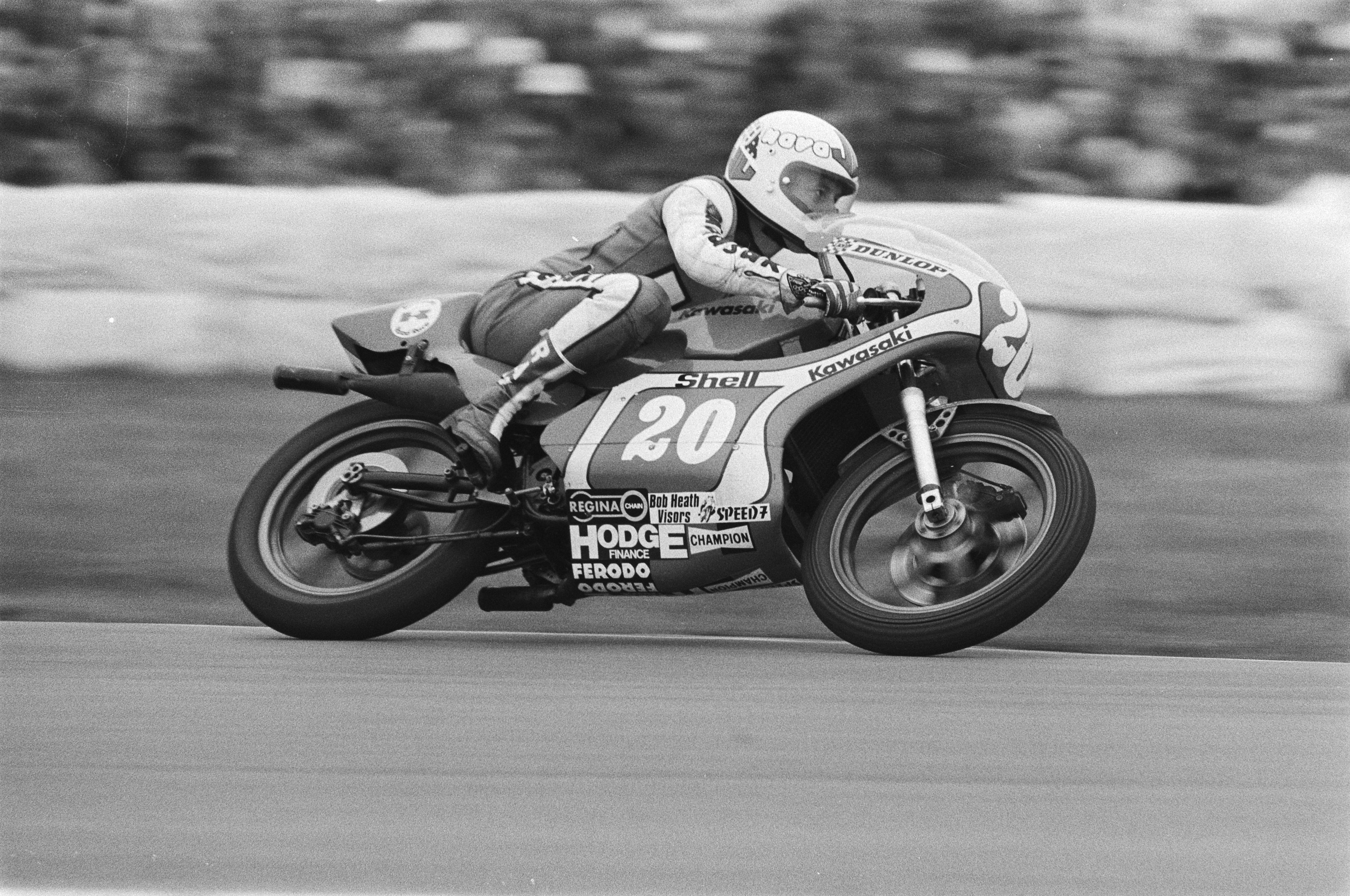
Grant enroute to victory at the 1977 250cc Dutch TT.

Grant raced in the Grand Prix motorcycle racing circuit in 1977 for the Kawasaki factory team alongside teammate Barry Ditchburn and the following year with Kork Ballington and Gregg Hansford. In 1979, Honda chose Grant to help develop their exotic oval-cylindered NR500, unfortunately with disappointing results. Grant also won the Macau Grand Prix in 1977 on the Kawasaki KR750 and again in 1984, riding a Heron-Suzuki.

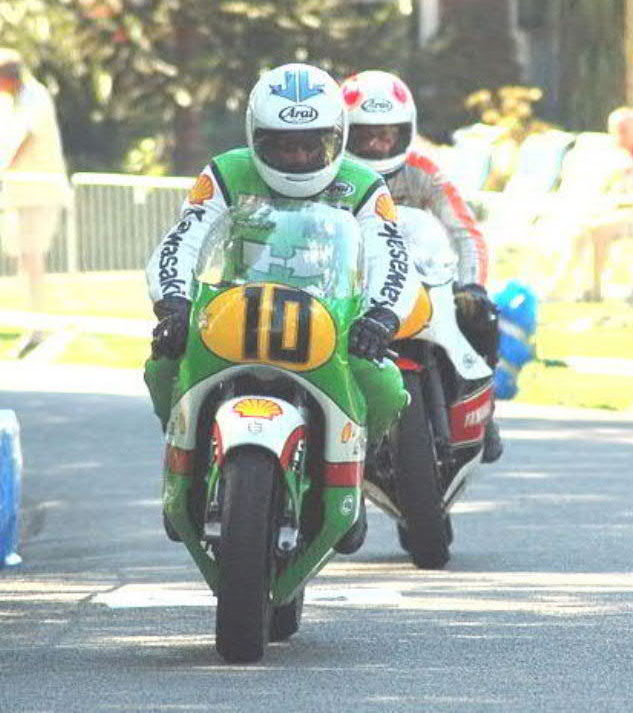
Mick Grant demonstrating a Kawasaki in 2009

Grant usually raced with number 10 and carried the initials JL on his helmet, even after retirement from competition, as a tribute to his early sponsor – mechanic, fabricator and frame-builder Jim Lee of the 'Dalesman' marque.

== Grand Prix motorcycle racing results ==
Points system from 1969 onwards:

**Position**	1	2	3	4	5	6	7	8	9	10
**Points**	15	12	10	8	6	5	4	3	2	1

(key) (Races in bold indicate pole position; races in italics indicate fastest lap)

Year	Class	Team	1	2	3	4	5	6	7	8	9	10	11	12	13	Points	Rank	Wins
1970	350cc	Yamaha	GER -		YUG -	IOM; 18	NED -		DDR -	CZE -	FIN -	ULS -	NAT -	ESP -		0	–	0
1970	500cc	Velocette	GER -	FRA -	YUG -	IOM; NC	NED -	BEL -	DDR -		FIN -	ULS -	NAT -	ESP -		0	–	0
1971	350cc	Yamaha	AUT -	GER -	IOM; 7	NED -	DDR -	CZE -	SWE -	FIN -	ULS -	NAT -	ESP -			4	36th	0
1972	250cc	Yamaha	GER -	FRA -	AUT -	NAT -	IOM; NC	YUG -	NED -	BEL -	DDR -	CZE -	SWE -	FIN -	ESP -	0	–	0
1972	350cc	Yamaha	GER -	FRA -	AUT -	NAT -	IOM; 3	YUG -	NED -		DDR -	CZE -	SWE -	FIN -	ESP -	10	17th	0
1972	500cc	Kawasaki	GER -	FRA -	AUT -	NAT -	IOM; 3	YUG -	NED -	BEL -	DDR -	CZE -	SWE -	FIN -	ESP -	10	17th	0
1973	250cc	Yamaha	FRA -	AUT -	GER; 10		IOM -	YUG -	NED; 4	BEL -	CZE -	SWE -	FIN -	ESP -		9	23rd	0
1973	350cc	Yamaha	FRA -	AUT -	GER -	NAT; 9	IOM; NC	YUG -	NED; 9		CZE -	SWE; 6	FIN -	ESP -		9	22nd	0
1973	500cc	Yamaha	FRA -	AUT -	GER -		IOM; NC	YUG -	NED -	BEL -	CZE -	SWE -	FIN -	ESP -		0	–	0
1974	250cc	Yamaha		GER -		NAT -	IOM; 2	NED; 10	BEL -	SWE; 6	FIN -	CZE -	YUG -	ESP -		18	10th	0
1974	350cc	Yamaha	FRA -	GER -	AUT -	NAT -	IOM; 2	NED -		SWE; 5	FIN -		YUG -	ESP -		18	11th	0
1974	500cc	Yamaha	FRA -	GER -	AUT -	NAT -	IOM; NC	NED -	BEL -	SWE -	FIN -	CZE -				0	–	0
1975	250cc	Kawasaki	FRA -	ESP -		GER -	NAT -	IOM; NC	NED -	BEL -	SWE -	FIN -	CZE -	YUG -		0	–	0
1975	500cc	Kawasaki	FRA -	ESP -	AUT -	GER -	NAT -	IOM; 1	NED -	BEL -	SWE -	FIN -	CZE -	YUG -		15	14th	1
1976	500cc	Kawasaki	FRA -	AUT -	NAT -	IOM; NC	NED -	BEL -	SWE -	FIN -	CZE -	GER -				0	–	0
1977	250cc	Kawasaki	VEN -	GER -	NAT -	ESP -	FRA -	YUG -	NED; 1	BEL; 14	**SWE**; 1	FIN; 2	CZE -	GBR -		42	8th	2
1978	250cc	Kawasaki	VEN -	ESP; 6		FRA -	NAT -	NED -	BEL -	SWE -	FIN; 7	GBR; 4	GER -	CZE -	YUG -	17	14th	0
1978	350cc	Kawasaki	VEN -		AUT -	FRA -	NAT -	NED; 7		SWE; 9	FIN -	GBR; 3	GER -	CZE -	YUG -	16	14th	0
1979	500cc	Suzuki	VEN -	AUT; 10	GER -	NAT -	ESP -	YUG -	NED -	BEL -	SWE -	FIN -				1	35th	0
1979	500cc	Honda											GBR; NC	FRA -		1	35th	0
1984	500cc	Suzuki	RSA -	NAT -	ESP -	AUT -	GER -	FRA -	YUG -	NED -	BEL -	GBR; 17	SWE -	RSM -		0	–	0

== Bibliography ==
- Grant, Mick (1979). Road Racing. Unwin Paperbacks. ISBN 978-0047960536.
- Grant, Mick; McDiarmid, Mac (2010). Mick Grant: Takin' the Mick. Sparkford, Yeovil, Somerset: Haynes Publishing. ISBN 978-1844257287.

Sporting positions
Preceded by Chas Mortimer	Macau Motorcycle Grand Prix Winner; 1977	Succeeded by Sadao Asami
Preceded by Ron Haslam	Macau Motorcycle Grand Prix Winner; 1984	Succeeded by Ron Haslam
