= Eugenio Lazzarini =

Italian motorcycle racer (born 1945)

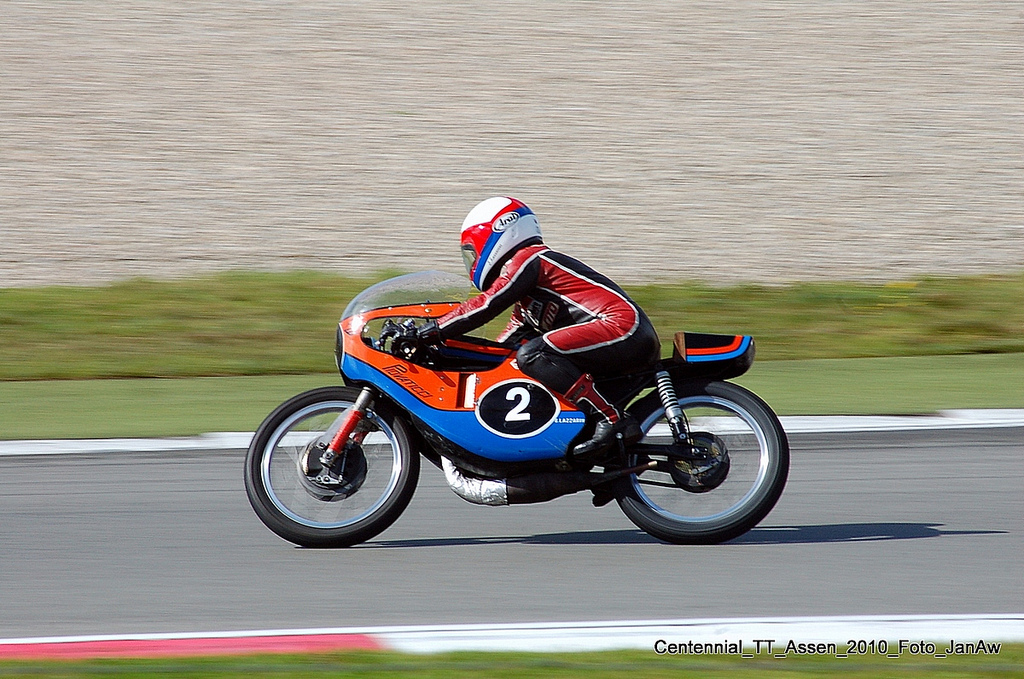
- Lazzarini at the 2010 Centennial Classic TT
- Nationality: Italian
Motorcycle racing career statistics
Grand Prix motorcycle racing
Active years	1969 - 1984
First race	1969 250cc French Grand Prix
Last race	1984 125cc San Marino Grand Prix
First win	1973 125cc Dutch TT
Last win	1983 125cc Belgian Grand Prix
Team(s)	Morbidelli, Garelli
Championships	50cc- 1979, 1980 125cc- 1978
Starts / Wins / Podiums / Poles / F. laps / Points; 132 / 27 / 81 / 14 / 15 / 1224

Eugenio Lazzarini (born 26 March 1945) is an Italian former professional motorcycle road racer. He competed in the FIM Grand Prix motorcycle racing world championships from 1969 to 1984. Lazzarini was a three-time World Champion and an eight-time Vice-Champion in the smaller engine displacement classes.

Lazzarini was born on March 26, 1945 in Urbino, Italy. He began to work at the Benelli motorcycle factory at the age of 14. Lazzarini began his Grand Prix career in 1969 in the 250 class on a 250cc Benelli. He won his first Grand Prix at the 1973 Dutch TT on a Maico. He captured the FIM 1978 125cc world championship riding an MBA. He followed that up with two 50cc world championships in 1979 and 1980 riding a Kreidler. His riding career spanned 15 seasons.

== Complete Grand Prix motorcycle racing results ==
Points system from 1969 onwards:

**Position**	1	2	3	4	5	6	7	8	9	10
**Points**	15	12	10	8	6	5	4	3	2	1

(key) (Races in bold indicate pole position; races in italics indicate fastest lap)

Year	Class	Bike	1	2	3	4	5	6	7	8	9	10	11	12	13	14	Points	Rank	Wins
1969	50cc	Derbi	ESP -	GER -	FRA -		NED; 10	BEL -	DDR; 6	CZE -		ULS -	NAT -	YUG -			6	21st	0
1969	250cc	Benelli	ESP -	GER -	FRA; 7	IOM -	NED -	BEL -	DDR -	CZE -	FIN -	ULS -	NAT -	YUG -			4	33rd	0
1970	50cc	Morbidelli	GER; 5	FRA; 8	YUG -		NED -	BEL -	DDR -	CZE -		ULS -	NAT -	ESP -			9	12th	0
1970	125cc	Morbidelli	GER -	FRA; 6	YUG -	IOM -	NED -	BEL -	DDR -	CZE -	FIN -		NAT -	ESP -			5	31st	0
1971	125cc	Maico	AUT -	GER -	IOM -	NED -	BEL; 9	DDR -	CZE -	SWE -	FIN -	NAT; 10	ESP -				3	32nd	0
1972	125cc	Maico	GER -	FRA -	AUT; 6	NAT; 5	IOM -	YUG; 4	NED -	BEL; 8	DDR -	CZE -	SWE -	FIN -	ESP -		22	11th	0
1973	125cc	Piovaticci	FRA; 4			NAT; 3	IOM -	YUG; 4						ESP; 4			59	5th	1
1973	125cc	Maico		AUT; 5	GER -				NED; 1	BEL -	CZE; 7	SWE; 8	FIN -				59	5th	1
1974	125cc	Piovaticci	FRA -	GER -	AUT -	NAT; 7	NED -	BEL; 6	SWE -	CZE -	YUG -	ESP -					9	20th	0
1975	50cc	Piovaticci		ESP; 4		GER; 2	NAT; 2	NED; 3	BEL; 3	SWE; 1	FIN; 2		YUG -				61	**2nd**	1
1975	125cc	Piovaticci	FRA; 4	ESP; 8	AUT -	GER; 10	NAT; 8	NED -	BEL; 5	SWE; 3		CZE; 3	**YUG**; 3				47	5th	0
1976	50cc	Morbidelli	FRA; 8		NAT; 2	YUG -	NED; 4	BEL; 4	SWE; 3	FIN; 3	GER -	ESP; 3					53	4th	0
1976	125cc	Morbidelli		AUT -	NAT; 5	YUG; 8	NED; 8	BEL; 3	SWE; 2	FIN; 10	GER -	ESP; 8					26	7th	0
1977	50cc	Kreidler			GER; 2	NAT; 1	ESP; 2		YUG -	NED; 4	BEL; 1	SWE; 3					72	**2nd**	2
1977	125cc	Morbidelli	VEN -	AUT; 1	**GER**; 2	NAT; 2	ESP; 2	FRA; 2	YUG -	NED -	BEL; 4	SWE; 3	FIN; 2	GBR; 2			105	**2nd**	1
1978	50cc	Kreidler		ESP; 1			NAT -	NED; 1	BEL; 2				GER; 3	CZE -	YUG; 2		64	**2nd**	2
1978	125cc	MBA	VEN; 2	ESP; 1	**AUT**; 1	FRA; 2	**NAT**; 1	**NED**; 1	BEL; 6	SWE -	**FIN**; 2	**GBR**; 3	GER; 8		YUG -		114	**1st**	4
1979	50cc	Kreidler			GER -	NAT; 1	ESP; 1	YUG; 1	NED; 1	BEL -					FRA; 1		75	**1st**	5
1979	125cc	MBA	VEN -	AUT; 5	GER; 6	NAT; 6	ESP -	YUG -	NED -	BEL -	SWE; 5	FIN -	GBR -	CZE -	FRA -		22	15th	0
1980	50cc	Iprem	NAT; 1	ESP; 1		YUG; 3	NED; 3	BEL; 2				GER; 2					74	**1st**	2
1980	125cc	MBA	NAT -	ESP -	FRA; 9	YUG -	NED -	BEL -	FIN -	GBR; 5	CZE -	GER -					8	17th	0
1981	125cc	Iprem	ARG -	AUT; 4	GER -	NAT -	FRA -	ESP -	YUG -	NED -	RSM -	GBR -	FIN -	SWE -	CZE -		8	18th	0
1982	50cc	Garelli				ESP; 2	NAT; 2	NED -		YUG; 1					RSM; 1	GER; 1	69	**2nd**	3
1982	125cc	Garelli	ARG; 8	AUT -	FRA -	**ESP**; 2	NAT -	**NED**; 2	BEL; 2	**YUG**; 1	GBR; 4	SWE; 2	FIN; 5	CZE; 1			95	**2nd**	2
1983	50cc	Garelli	FRA; 2	NAT; 1	GER; 2	ESP; 1		YUG; 1	NED -				RSM -				69	**2nd**	3
1983	125cc	Garelli	FRA; NC	NAT; 2	**GER**; 2	ESP; 2	**AUT**; 2	YUG -	**NED**; 7	BEL; 1	GBR -	SWE -	RSM -				67	**3rd**	1
1984	125cc	Garelli	NAT; 3	ESP; 2	GER; 3	**FRA**; 2	NED; 2	GBR; NC	SWE; 3	RSM; 2							78	**2nd**	0
