= Virginio Ferrari =

Italian motorcycle racer

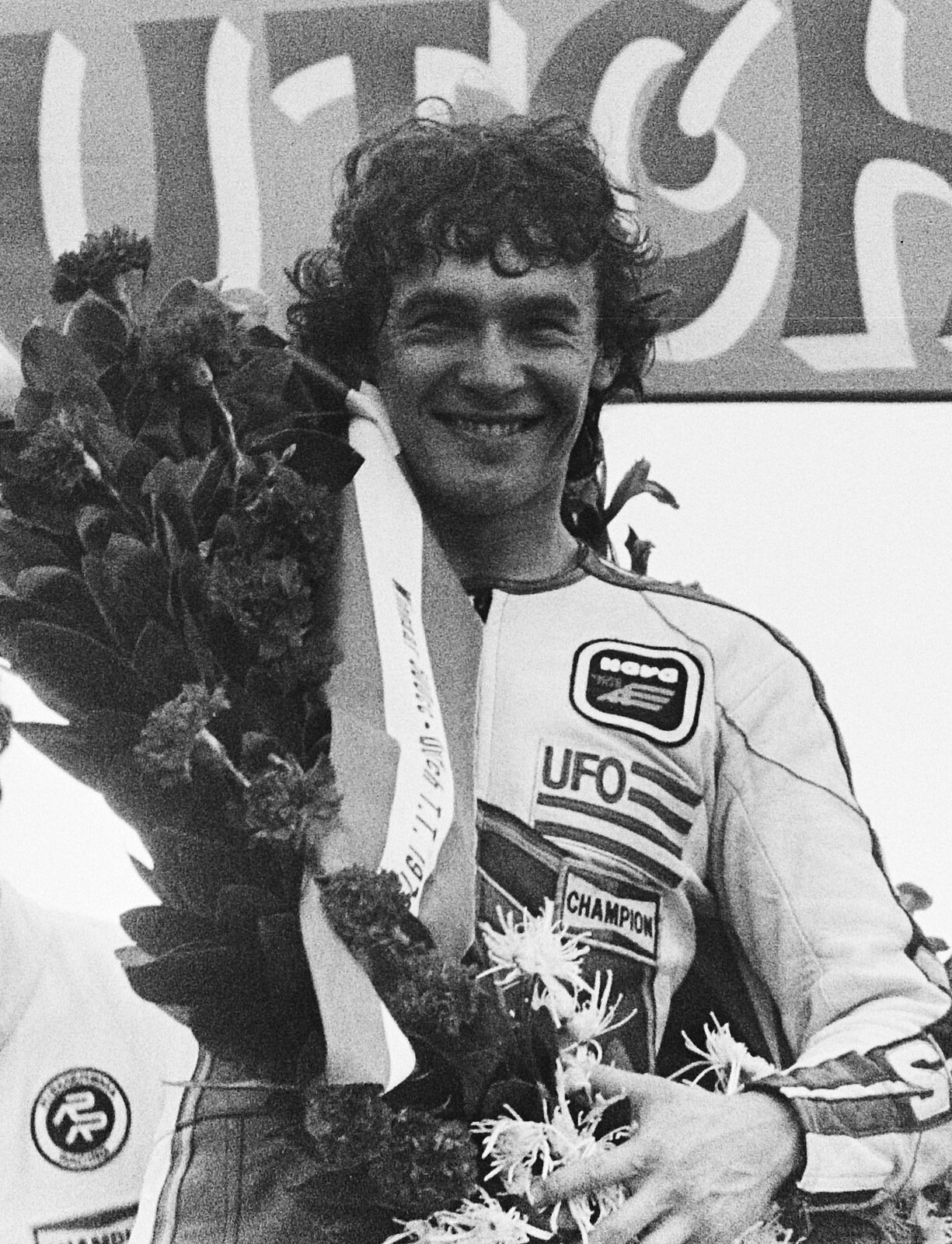
- Ferrari in 1979
- Nationality: Italian
Motorcycle racing career statistics
Grand Prix motorcycle racing
Active years	1976 - 1989
First race	1976 500cc Nations Grand Prix
Last race	1989 250cc Czechoslovak Grand Prix
First win	1978 500cc West German Grand Prix
Last win	1979 500cc Dutch TT
Team(s)	Suzuki, Cagiva
Starts / Wins / Podiums / Poles / F. laps / Points; 54 / 2 / 10 / 1 / 3

Virginio Ferrari (born 19 October 1952) is an Italian former professional Grand Prix motorcycle road racer. His best season was in the 1979 500cc world championship, when he finished second to Kenny Roberts.

== Motorcycle racing career ==
Ferrari teamed up with Benjamin Grau to win the 1975 1000 km du Mugello endurance race riding a Ducati. He began the 1979 season with a string of podium results, finishing second to Barry Sheene at the Venezuelan Grand Prix and, second to Kenny Roberts in the Austrian Grand Prix. He continued to post good results with a third place in Germany and another second place behind Roberts in Italy. Ferrari dropped from the podium with a fourth place in Spain before bouncing back with another second place to Roberts in Yugoslavia. His victory at the Dutch TT in Assen together with an eighth-place finish by Roberts, vaulted Ferrari into the championship lead as the series headed towards Belgium.

Ferrari became embroiled in a controversy at the Belgian Grand Prix held at the Spa circuit when he, along with Roberts and other top riders refused to race due to unsafe track conditions. The circuit had been paved just days before the race creating a track that many of the racers felt was unsafe due to diesel seeping to the surface. Ferrari along with Roberts, instigated a riders' revolt and refused to race. The F.I.M. responded by suspending Roberts and Ferrari. The F.I.M. later reduced this to a probation.

After the Belgian round, Ferrari suffered a series of disastrous results with a fifteenth place in Finland followed by an improved fourth place in Britain before a crash at the season-ending French Grand Prix handed the world championship to Roberts.

In 1986, Ferrari rode a Honda NSR250 in a team run by Takazumi Katayama in the World Championship without much success, with just four top-ten results, his best, a sixth place in Silverstone. He finished 14th in the Championship. Ferrari won the 1987 TT Formula 1 title aboard a Bimota YB4 EI. His last Grand Prix season was in 1989, again in the 250 class, with the Italian made Gazzaniga, failing to score any points and finishing 28th in the Salzburgring and 27th in his last Grand Prix in Brno.

Ferrari was the first person on the scene on Kevin Wrettom's and Iván Palazzese's fatal accidents, in 1984 and 1989 respectively. He attempted to resuscitate them both, but Wrettom died several days later at the hospital, while Palazzese had unsurvivable chest injuries.

After his Grand Prix career, Ferrari switched to the Superbike World Championship in 1988, riding for the Ducati factory racing team. He took over as the team manager until 1998, when Davide Tardozzi took the job. Ferrari briefly managed the Kawasaki PSG-1 team in the World Superbike Championship in 2007.

== Motorcycle Grand Prix results ==
Points system from 1969 to 1987:

**Position**	1	2	3	4	5	6	7	8	9	10
**Points**	15	12	10	8	6	5	4	3	2	1

Points system from 1988 to 1992:

**Position**	1	2	3	4	5	6	7	8	9	10	11	12	13	14	15
**Points**	20	17	15	13	11	10	9	8	7	6	5	4	3	2	1

(key) (Races in bold indicate pole position; races in italics indicate fastest lap)

Year	Class	Team	1	2	3	4	5	6	7	8	9	10	11	12	13	14	15	Points	Rank	Wins
1976	500cc	Suzuki	FRA -	AUT -	NAT; 3	IOM -	NED -	BEL -	SWE -	FIN -	TCH -	**GER**; NC						10	21st	0
1977	500cc	Suzuki	VEN; 6	AUT -	GER -	NAT; 2	FRA; 8	NED; 10	BEL -	SWE -	FIN -	TCH -	GBR -					21	12th	0
1978	500cc	Gallina-Suzuki	VEN -	ESP -	AUT -	FRA -	NAT -	NED -	BEL -	SWE; 5	FIN -	GBR; 10	GER; 1					22	11th	1
1979	500cc	Gallina-Suzuki	VEN; 2	AUT; 2	GER; 3	NAT; 2	ESP; 4	YUG; 2	NED; 1	BEL; DNS	SWE -	FIN; 15	GBR; 4	FRA; NC				89	**2nd**	1
1980	500cc	Cagiva	NAT -	ESP -	FRA -	NED -	BEL -	FIN -	GBR -	GER -								0	-	0
1981	500cc	Cagiva	AUT -	GER -	NAT -	FRA -	YUG -	NED -	BEL -	RSM -	GBR -	FIN -	SWE -					0	-	0
1982	500cc	HB-Suzuki	ARG -	AUT -	FRA -	ESP -	NAT -	NED -	BEL -	YUG -	GBR; 6	SWE -	RSM; 4	GER; 2				25	11th	0
1983	500cc	Cagiva	RSA; 15	FRA; NC	NAT; 11	GER; NC	ESP -	AUT; 23	YUG -	NED -	BEL -	GBR; NC	SWE -	RSM; NC				0	-	0
1984	500cc	Marlboro-Yamaha	RSA; NC	NAT; 8	ESP -	AUT; 14	GER; 7	FRA; 22	YUG; 9	NED; NC	BEL; NC	GBR; 4	SWE; 6	RSM; NC				22	10th	0
1985	500cc	Cagiva	RSA -	ESP -	GER -	NAT -	AUT -	YUG -	NED -	BEL -	FRA -	GBR -	SWE -	RSM; NC				0	-	0
1986	250cc	Total-Honda	ESP -	NAT -	GER; 24	AUT; 12	YUG; 7	NED; NC	BEL; NC	FRA; 9	GBR; 6	SWE; NC	RSM; 8					14	14th	0
1987	250cc	Total-Honda	JPN; NC	ESP -	GER -	NAT -	AUT -	YUG -	NED -	FRA -	GBR -	SWE -	TCH -	RSM -	POR -	BRA -	ARG -	0	-	0
1989	250cc	Gazzaniga	JPN -	AUS -	USA -	ESP -	NAT -	GER; NC	AUT; 28	YUG -	NED -	BEL -	FRA -	GBR -	SWE -	TCH; 27	BRA -	0	-	0

Sporting positions
Preceded by Joey Dunlop	TT Formula One World Champion; 1987	Succeeded by Carl Fogarty
