= Hans Müller (motorcyclist) =

Swiss motorcycle racer (born 1949)

- Nationality: Swiss
Motorcycle racing career statistics
Grand Prix motorcycle racing
Active years	1973, 1975 - 1984
First race	1973 250cc Spanish Grand Prix
Last race	1984 80cc San Marino Grand Prix
Starts / Wins / Podiums / Poles / F. laps / Points; 81 / 0 / 15 / 6 / 1 / 504

Hans Müller (born 1949) is a former Grand Prix motorcycle road racer from Switzerland. His best year was in 1979, where he finished in third place in the 125cc world championship.
