= Patrick Fernandez =

French motorcycle racer

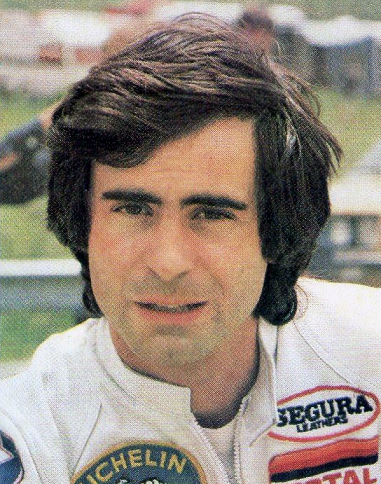
- Patrick Fernandez (1978)
- Nationality: French
Motorcycle racing career statistics
Grand Prix motorcycle racing
Active years	1975–1985
First race	1975 125cc Austrian Grand Prix
Last race	1985 250cc Yugoslavian Grand Prix
First win	1979 350cc French Grand Prix
Last win	1984 250cc South African Grand Prix
Starts / Wins / Podiums / Poles / F. laps / Points; 104 / 3 / 26 / 4 / 1 / 442

Patrick Fernandez (born 4 March 1952) is a French former Grand Prix motorcycle road racer. His best year was in 1979, where he rode a Yamaha to finish second to Kork Ballington in the 350cc world championship. Fernandez won three Grand Prix races during his career.
