= Morbidelli =

Italian motorcycle manufacturer

- Industry: Motorcycle manufacturing, Machine tool
- Founded: 1959
- Founder: Giancarlo Morbidelli
- Defunct: 1987
- Headquarters: Pesaro, Italy
- Products: Motorcycles, woodworking machine
- Parent: SCM Group
- Website: https://www.scmgroup.com/it/scmwood/azienda/history/morbidelli

Morbidelli was an Italian motorcycle manufacturer founded by Giancarlo Morbidelli in Pesaro. During the late 1970s and early 1980s, the company was particularly successful in Grand Prix motorcycle racing. The team won the 125 cc world championship in 1975, 1976 and 1977, and won the 250 cc championship in 1977.

In April 2024, the rights of Morbidelli brand name (in the motorcycle industry) was acquired by MBP, a subsidiary of the Keeway Qianjiang Group.

== History ==
The firm, founded in 1959 as Morbidelli Woodworking Machines, began as a woodworking shop building furniture and wooden coach bodies for automobiles. After the second world war, Morbidelli evolved into a leading designer and manufacturer of precision woodworking machine tools. While Giancarlo Morbidelli's machine business grew to have 300+ employees, his personal passion lay in motorcycles and motorcycle racing. Morbidelli used woodworking machine tool business income to finance motorcycle design, development, and racing interests.

In 1987 Morbidelli was acquired by italian SCM Group.

=== Racing ===
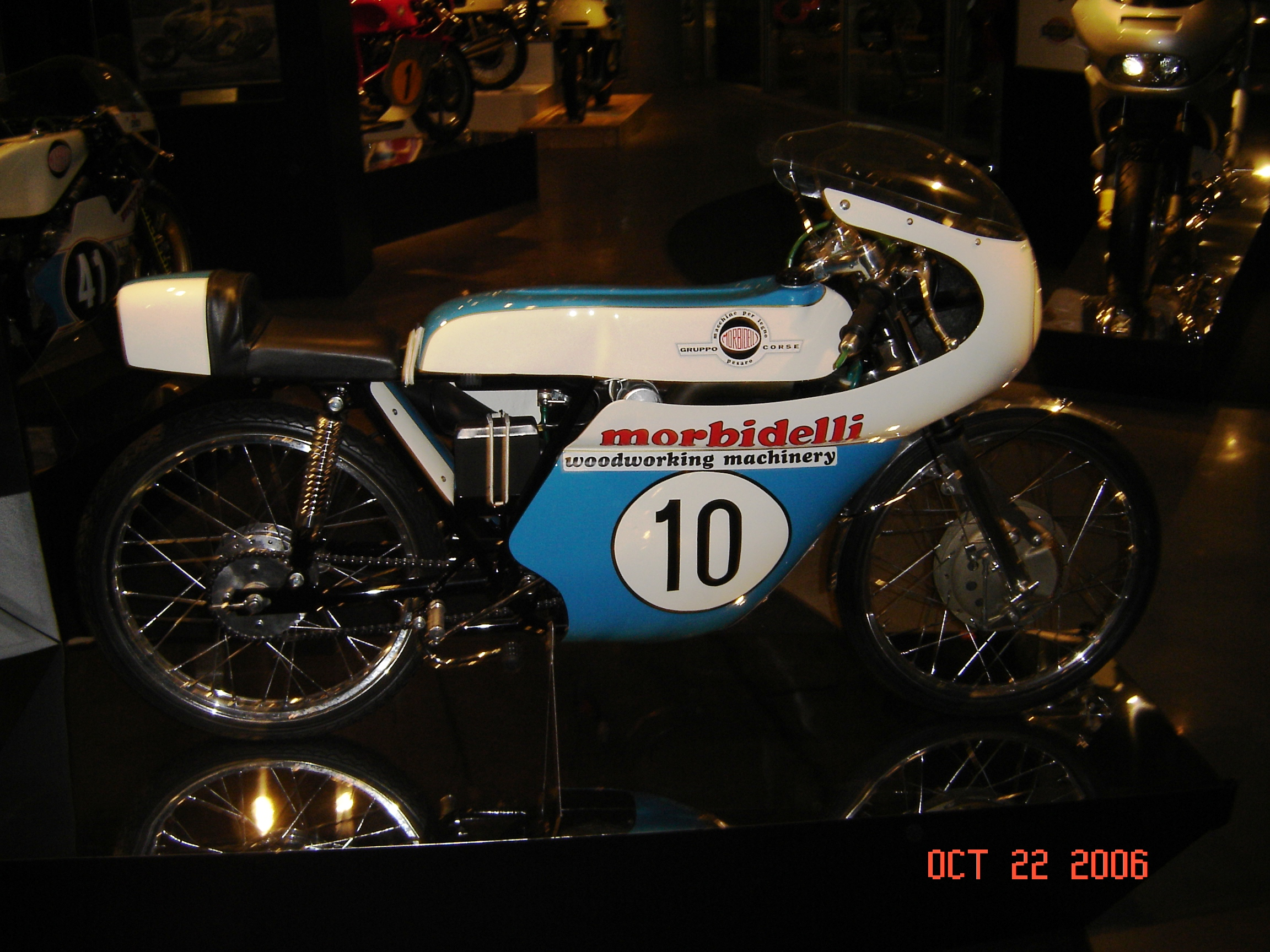
Morbidelli 50 cc Grand Prix, 1971 at the Barber Vintage Motorsports Museum.

In 1969, he entered a team in the Grand Prix motorcycle racing Italian championships with a 50 cc machine. In 1971, he also commissioned the construction of a water-cooled disc valve 125 cc two-stroke of Ringhini design, inspired by the engine of an ex-works Suzuki 125cc. The team won two 125 cc Grand Prix races with Italian rider Gilberto Parlotti at the beginning of the 1972 season but tragedy struck when Parlotti was killed during the Isle of Man TT race.

Despite Parlotti's death, Morbidelli persevered with his racing effort. Starting in 1974 Jörg Möller, previously the designer for Van Veen Kreidler, took over development. In 1975, he was rewarded with his first World Championship when Paolo Pileri won the 125 cc crown. His Morbidelli teammate, Pier Paolo Bianchi finished in second. Bianchi won the 125 cc championship a year later. The 1977 Grand Prix season would mark the height of Morbidelli's accomplishments when the team won both the 125 and 250 classes. Mario Lega won the 250 crown and Pier Paolo Bianchi would take the 125 honors.

Up until 1976 Morbidellis were not available for sale to private racers - only the team's own works riders could race on them. A new factory was built with help from Benelli Armi in Pesaro, called the MBA factory (Morbidelli-Benelli-Armi), to produce Morbidelli motorcycles of 123 cc and 248 cc in quantity. These were raced successfully for several more years.

The MBA team won the 125 cc World Championship in year 1978 with Eugenio Lazzarini and in 1980 with Pier Paolo Bianchi. Morbidelli continued in Grand Prix competition until the 1982 season.

Giancarlo Morbidelli's son, Gianni Morbidelli became a successful racecar driver, reaching Formula One where he achieved a podium finish.

=== Morbidelli V8 ===
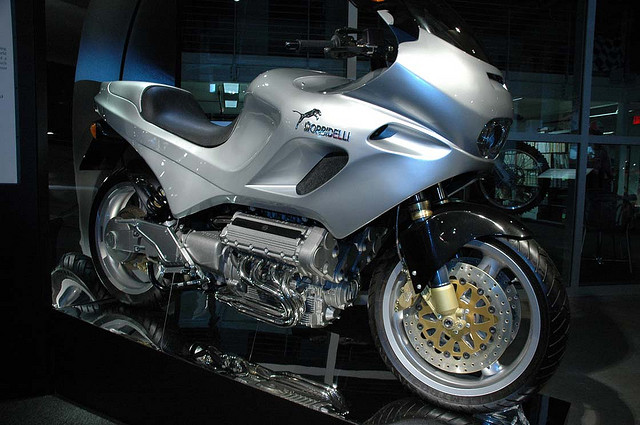
Morbidelli V8 at the Barber Vintage Motorsports Museum.

In 1994, Morbidelli constructed an innovative shaft-drive, five-speed, 32-valve, liquid-cooled, 847 cc, 90° V8, sport touring motorcycle, but its high price meant it would not be economically feasible to produce. The Guinness Book of World Records listed it in 2001 as the world's most expensive motorcycle. Because of the bike's exotic design, it was displayed in The Art of the Motorcycle at the Guggenheim Museums in New York, Bilbao and Las Vegas. An example can also be seen at the Barber Vintage Motorsports Museum in Birmingham, Alabama, United States. Another V8 is on display at the Morbidelli Museum in Pesaro, Italy.

=== The documentary ===
The story of the Morbidelli racing team is told in the documentary film Morbidelli - a story of men and fast motorcycles (2014), by directors Jeffrey Zani and Matthew Gonzales. The documentary features footage from the 1972 Tourist Trophy, the 1976 and 1977 racing seasons, races in the city of Pesaro in the 1950s, and more. It also features interviews with riders Eugenio Lazzarini, Alberto Ieva, Pier Paolo Bianchi, Mario Lega and Graziano Rossi.

== Morbidelli today ==
Today the former Morbidelli factory in Pesaro houses a classic motorcycle museum. The complete world championship story is represented among the exhibits as well as many antique motorcycles.

== See also ==
- List of Italian companies
- List of motorcycle manufacturers
- List of motorcycles by type of engine
