= 1977 Swedish motorcycle Grand Prix =

(Sweden) 1977 Swedish Grand Prix
Race details
- Race 10 of 13 races in the 1977 Grand Prix motorcycle racing season
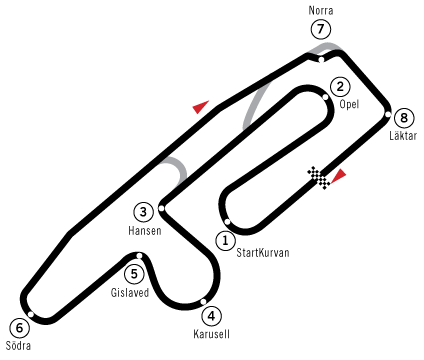
- Date: 24 July 1977
- Official name: Swedish TT
- Location: Scandinavian Raceway
- Course: Permanent racing facility; 4.018 km (2.497 mi)

500cc
Pole position
- Rider: (United Kingdom) Barry Sheene
- Time: 1:40.277
Fastest lap
- Rider: (United Kingdom) Barry Sheene
- Time: 1:39.802
Podium
- First: (United Kingdom) Barry Sheene
- Second: (Venezuela) Johnny Cecotto
- Third: (United States) Steve Baker

350cc
Pole position
- Rider: (France) Patrick Fernandez
- Time: 1:43.248
Fastest lap
- Rider: (South Africa) Kork Ballington
- Time: 1:42.281
Podium
- First: (Japan) Takazumi Katayama
- Second: (South Africa) Kork Ballington
- Third: (France) Patrick Fernandez

250cc
Pole position
- Rider: (United Kingdom) Mick Grant
- Time: 1:45.804
Fastest lap
- Rider: (United Kingdom) Mick Grant
- Time: 1:46.285
Podium
- First: (United Kingdom) Mick Grant
- Second: (Italy) Mario Lega
- Third: (South Africa) Jon Ekerold

125cc
Pole position
- Rider: (Italy) Pierpaolo Bianchi
- Time: 1:49.691
Fastest lap
- Rider: (Italy) Eugenio Lazzarini
- Time: 1:57.787
Podium
- First: (Spain) Ángel Nieto
- Second: (Italy) Pierpaolo Bianchi
- Third: (Italy) Eugenio Lazzarini

50cc
Pole position
- Rider: (Italy) Eugenio Lazzarini
- Time: 1:57.313
Fastest lap
- Rider: (Spain) Ricardo Tormo
- Time: 2:15.941
Podium
- First: (Spain) Ricardo Tormo
- Second: (Spain) Ángel Nieto
- Third: (Italy) Eugenio Lazzarini

The 1977 Swedish motorcycle Grand Prix was the tenth round of the 1977 Grand Prix motorcycle racing season. It took place on 23–24 July 1977 at the Scandinavian Raceway.

== 500cc classification ==
Pos.	No.	Rider	Team	Manufacturer	Time/Retired	Points
1	7	(United Kingdom) Barry Sheene	Texaco Heron Team Suzuki	Suzuki	47'21.279	15
2	25	(Venezuela) Johnny Cecotto	Team Venemotos	Yamaha	+2.952	12
3	18	(United States) Steve Baker	Yamaha Motor Company	Yamaha	+26.740	12
4	15	(United Kingdom) Steve Parrish	Texaco Heron Team Suzuki	Suzuki	+28.498	8
5	41	(Netherlands) Wil Hartog	Riemersma Racing	Suzuki	+31.567	6
6	26	(Italy) Gianfranco Bonera	Team Nava Olio Fiat	Suzuki	+39.219	5
7	24	(Italy) Armando Toracca	MC della Robbia	Suzuki	+1'00.675	4
8	9	(United Kingdom) John Williams	Team Appleby Glade	Suzuki	+1'02.981	3
9	44	(Italy) Giacomo Agostini	Team API Marlboro	Yamaha	+1'10.204	2
10	3	(United States) Pat Hennen	Texaco Heron Team Suzuki	Suzuki	+1'22.289	1
11	28	(France) Michel Rougerie		Suzuki	+1 lap	
12	42	(Austria) Max Wiener	MSC Rottenberg	Suzuki	+1 lap	
13	32	(Norway) Alf Graarud		Suzuki	+1 lap	
14	8	(Australia) Jack Findlay	Hermetite Racing International	Suzuki	+1 lap	
15	36	(Sweden) Bo Granath		Suzuki	+2 laps	
16	12	(United Kingdom) Alex George	Hermetite Racing International	Suzuki	+2 laps	
17	43	(Canada) Ron Kirkham		Yamaha	+3 laps	
Ret	25	(Belgium) Jean-Philippe Orban	Jean-Philippe Orban Racing Team	Suzuki	Retired	
Ret	25	(Norway) Odd Arne Lände		Suzuki	Retired	
Ret	15	(France) Christian Estrosi	Marlboro Masche Total	Suzuki	Retired	
Ret	2	(Finland) Teuvo Länsivuori	Life Racing Team	Suzuki	Retired	
Ret	??	(Austria) Karl Auer	MSC Rottenberg	Yamaha	Brake problems	
Ret	4	(Italy) Marco Lucchinelli	Life Racing Team	Suzuki	Brake problems	
Ret	43	(West Germany) Helmut Kassner	Boeri Giudici Racing Team	Suzuki	Water leak	
Ret	26	(West Germany) Anton Mang	Valvoline Racing Hamburg	Suzuki	Retired	
Ret	6	(United Kingdom) John Newbold	Maurice Newbold	Suzuki	Accident	
Ret	18	(Italy) Virginio Ferrari	Team Nava Olio Fiat	Suzuki	Retired	
Ret	35	(Finland) Markku Matikainen	Länsivuori Team	Suzuki	Retired	
Ret	??	(Norway) Beni Slydal		Suzuki	Retired	
DNS	5	(Switzerland) Philippe Coulon	Marlboro Masche Total	Suzuki	Injured	

== 350 cc classification ==
Pos	No.	Rider	Manufacturer	Laps	Time	Grid	Points
1	8	(Japan) Takazumi Katayama	Yamaha	28	48:23.314	9	15
2	21	(South Africa) Kork Ballington	Yamaha	28	+0.216	3	12
3	18	(France) Patrick Fernandez	Yamaha	28	+22.588	1	10
4	52	(South Africa) Jon Ekerold	Yamaha	28	+37.477	8	8
5	45	(Australia) Vic Soussan	Yamaha	28	+42.006	2	6
6	4	(United Kingdom) Tom Herron	Yamaha	28	+48.375	6	5
7	12	(Finland) Pentti Korhonen	Yamaha	28	+51.089	20	4
8	28	(Finland) Pekka Nurmi	Yamaha	28	+55.840	7	3
9	14	(France) Patrick Pons	Yamaha	28	+57.303	17	2
10	19	(France) Christian Sarron	Yamaha	28	+1:02.963	12	1
11	34	(Italy) Mario Lega	Morbidelli	28	+1:07.602	10	
12	9	(France) Olivier Chevallier	Yamaha	28	+1:07.741	13	
13	11	(Italy) Giacomo Agostini	Yamaha	28	+1:10.774	11	
14	47	(Finland) Seppo Rossi	Yamaha	28	+1:31.756	18	
15	17	(Finland) Eero Hyvärinen	Yamaha	28	+1:34.545		
16	37	(Japan) Ken Nemoto	Yamaha	27	+1 lap		
17	51	(Sweden) Peter Skold	Yamaha	27	+1 lap	5	
18	6	(Spain) Víctor Palomo	Yamaha	27	+1 lap		
19	54	(Finland) Reino Eskelinen	Yamaha	27	+1 lap		
20	27	(Belgium) Etienne Geeraerd	Yamaha	27	+1 lap		
		(Venezuela) Johnny Cecotto	Yamaha			4	
		(United Kingdom) Eddie Roberts	Yamaha			14	
		(Sweden) Lennart Baeckstrom	Yamaha			15	
		(France) Michel Rougerie	Yamaha			16	
		(United Kingdom) Chas Mortimer	Yamaha			19	
30 starters in total

== 250 cc classification ==
Pos	No.	Rider	Manufacturer	Laps	Time	Grid	Points
1	54	(United Kingdom) Mick Grant	Kawasaki	28	50:24.853	1	15
2	21	(Italy) Mario Lega	Morbidelli	28	+4.951	3	12
3	32	(South Africa) Jon Ekerold	Yamaha	28	+13.192		10
4	2	(Japan) Takazumi Katayama	Yamaha	28	+16.570	11	8
5	39	(South Africa) Alan North	Yamaha	28	+17.020	2	6
6	7	(United Kingdom) Chas Mortimer	Yamaha	28	+24.944	16	5
7	5	(United Kingdom) Tom Herron	Yamaha	28	+25.156	4	4
8	9	(France) Olivier Chevallier	Yamaha	28	+45.029	9	3
9	41	(Australia) Vic Soussan	Yamaha	28	+45.067	8	2
10	37	(Finland) Eero Hyvärinen	Yamaha	28	+45.815	14	1
11	38	(Italy) Paolo Pileri	Morbidelli	28	+55.420	15	
12	33	(France) Alain Terras	Yamaha	28	+56.070		
13	12	(France) Patrick Pons	Yamaha	28	+56.385		
14	43	(France) Christian Sarron	Yamaha	28	+1:15.008	20	
15	18	(Japan) Ken Nemoto	Yamaha	28	+1:15.276		
16	46	(Sweden) Lennart Baeckstrom	Yamaha	28	+1:25.152		
17	52	(Venezuela) Aldo Nannini	Yamaha	28	+1:25.457	6	
18	49	(Sweden) Peter Skold	Yamaha	27	+1 lap	17	
		(France) Patrick Fernandez	Yamaha			5	
		(South Africa) Kork Ballington	Yamaha			7	
		(United Kingdom) Barry Ditchburn	Kawasaki			10	
		(Switzerland) Hans Müller	Yamaha			12	
		(Italy) Walter Villa	Harley-Davidson			13	
		(Finland) Pekka Nurmi	Yamaha			18	
		(Italy) Franco Uncini	Harley-Davidson			19	
30 starters in total

== 125 cc classification ==
Pos	No.	Rider	Manufacturer	Laps	Time	Grid	Points
1	2	(Spain) Ángel Nieto	Bultaco	26	54:57.984	2	15
2	1	(Italy) Pierpaolo Bianchi	Morbidelli	26	+7.676	1	12
3	7	(Italy) Eugenio Lazzarini	Morbidelli	26	+8.204	3	10
4	6	(France) Jean-Louis Guignabodet	Morbidelli	26	+24.277	5	8
5	26	(Italy) Claudio Lusuardi	Morbidelli	26	+31.113	13	6
6	8	(Germany) Gert Bender	Bender	26	+43.702	4	5
7	9	(Switzerland) Stefan Dörflinger	Morbidelli	26	+44.877	8	4
8	32	(Switzerland) Hans Müller	Morbidelli	26	+57.261	10	3
9	19	(France) Thierry Noblesse	Morbidelli	25	+1 lap	11	2
10	37	(Sweden) Per-Edward Carlson	Morbidelli	25	+1 lap	7	1
11	21	(Sweden) Hans Hallberg	Morbidelli	25	+1 lap	14	
12	33	(Germany) Hagen Klein	Morbidelli	25	+1 lap		
13	10	(Belgium) Julien van Zeebroeck	Motobécane	25	+1 lap	9	
14	5	(Germany) Anton Mang	Morbidelli	25	+1 lap	17	
15	41	(Sweden) Jan Baeckstrom	Maico	25	+1 lap		
16	38	(Sweden) Johnny Svensson	Bastard	24	+2 laps		
17	18	(France) Michel Baloche	Motobécane	22	+4 laps	18	
18	40	(Sweden) Christer Eliasson	Morbidelli	21	+5 laps		
		(Austria) Harald Bartol	Morbidelli			6	
		(Finland) Matti Kinnunen	Morbidelli			12	
		(Germany) Horst Seel	Seel			15	
		(Sweden) Bengt Johansson	Morbidelli			16	
		(Netherlands) Jan Ubels	Buton			19	
		(Sweden) Lennart Lundgren	Yamaha			20	
30 starters in total

== 50 cc classification ==
Pos	No.	Rider	Manufacturer	Laps	Time	Grid	Points
1	20	(Spain) Ricardo Tormo	Bultaco	16	36:48.665	3	15
2	1	(Spain) Ángel Nieto	Bultaco	16	+39.208	4	12
3	4	(Italy) Eugenio Lazzarini	Kreidler	16	+45.064	1	10
4	8	(Switzerland) Stefan Dörflinger	Kreidler	16	+1:34.630	2	8
5	12	(Netherlands) Theo Timmer	Kreidler	16	+1:44.964	8	6
6	11	(Italy) Claudio Lusuardi	Lusuardi	16	+1:50.228	20	5
7	6	(Belgium) Julien van Zeebroeck	Kreidler	16	+2:00.071	13	4
8	25	(France) Jean-Louis Guignabodet	Morbidelli	16	+2:12.172	10	3
9	28	(Sweden) Lennart Lundgren	Kreidler	15	+1 lap	14	2
10	34	(Netherlands) Juup Bosman	Kreidler	15	+1 lap	11	1
11	21	(Netherlands) Engelbert Kip	Kreidler	15	+1 lap	9	
12	27	(Norway) Ove Skifjeld	Kreidler	15	+1 lap		
		(France) Patrick Plisson	ABF			5	
		(Germany) Herbert Rittberger	Kreidler			6	
		(Austria) Hans Hummel	Kreidler			7	
		(Germany) Wolfgang Müller	Kreidler			12	
		(Netherlands) Cees van Dongen	Kreidler			15	
		(Belgium) Pierre Dumont	Kreidler			16	
		(Germany) Hagen Klein	Kreidler			17	
		(Sweden) Oscar Ekstrand	Kreidler			18	
		(Germany) Günter Schirnhofer	Kreidler			19	
25 starters in total

Previous race: 1977 Belgian Grand Prix	FIM Grand Prix World Championship; 1977 season	Next race: 1977 Finnish Grand Prix
Previous race: 1976 Swedish Grand Prix	Swedish Grand Prix	Next race: 1978 Swedish Grand Prix
