= 1977 Belgian motorcycle Grand Prix =

(Belgium) 1977 Belgian Grand Prix
Race details
- Race 9 of 13 races in the 1977 Grand Prix motorcycle racing season
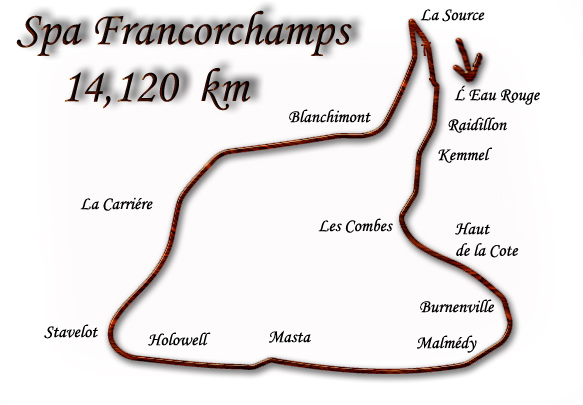
- Date: 3 July 1977
- Official name: Grand Prix Belgique/Grote Prijs Belgie
- Location: Circuit de Spa-Francorchamps
- Course: Permanent racing facility; 14.100 km (8.761 mi)

500cc
Pole position
- Rider: (Switzerland) Philippe Coulon
- Time: 3:50.900
Fastest lap
- Rider: (United Kingdom) Barry Sheene
- Time: 3:50.300
Podium
- First: (United Kingdom) Barry Sheene
- Second: (United States) Steve Baker
- Third: (United States) Pat Hennen

250cc
Pole position
- Rider: (Italy) Walter Villa
- Time: 4:09.900
Fastest lap
- Rider: (Italy) Walter Villa
- Time: 4:05.400
Podium
- First: (Italy) Walter Villa
- Second: (Japan) Takazumi Katayama
- Third: (Italy) Mario Lega

125cc
Pole position
Rider	(Italy) Pierpaolo Bianchi	Morbidelli
Time	4:24.100	
Fastest lap
Rider	(Spain) Ángel Nieto	
Time	4:22.200	
Podium
First	(Italy) Pierpaolo Bianchi	
Second	(Spain) Ángel Nieto	
Third	(West Germany) Anton Mang	

50cc
Pole position
- Rider: (Spain) Ángel Nieto
- Time: 5:07.600
Fastest lap
- Rider: (Italy) Eugenio Lazzarini
- Time: 5:07.400
Podium
- First: (Italy) Eugenio Lazzarini
- Second: (West Germany) Herbert Rittberger
- Third: (Spain) Ángel Nieto

Sidecar (B2A)
Pole position
- Rider: (West Germany) Werner Schwärzel
- Passenger: (West Germany) Andreas Huber
- Time: 4:14.300
Fastest lap
- Rider: (West Germany) Rolf Steinhausen
- Passenger: (West Germany) Wolfgang Kalauch
- Time: 4:13.500
Podium
- First rider: (West Germany) Werner Schwärzel
- First passenger: (West Germany) Andreas Huber
- Second rider: (West Germany) Rolf Steinhausen
- Second passenger: (West Germany) Wolfgang Kalauch
- Third rider: (United Kingdom) George O'Dell
- Third passenger: (United Kingdom) Cliff Holland

The 1977 Belgian motorcycle Grand Prix was the ninth round of the 1977 Grand Prix motorcycle racing season. It took place on 3 July 1977 at the Circuit de Spa-Francorchamps. Barry Sheene won the race with an average speed of 135.0 mph making it the fastest motorcycle Grand Prix in history.

== 500cc classification ==
Pos.	No.	Rider	Team	Manufacturer	Time/Retired	Points
1	7	(United Kingdom) Barry Sheene	Texaco Heron Team Suzuki	Suzuki	38'58.500	15
2	2	(United States) Steve Baker	Yamaha Motor Company	Yamaha	+11.300	12
3	3	(United States) Pat Hennen	Texaco Heron Team Suzuki	Suzuki	+14.600	10
4	41	(Finland) Teuvo Länsivuori	Life Racing Team	Suzuki	+15.600	8
5	11	(United Kingdom) Steve Parrish	Texaco Heron Team Suzuki	Suzuki	+17.500	6
6	27	(Switzerland) Philippe Coulon	Marlboro Masche Total	Suzuki	+25.800	5
7	19	(Netherlands) Wil Hartog	Riemersma Racing	Suzuki	+33.000	4
8	1	(Italy) Giacomo Agostini	Team API Marlboro	Yamaha	+36.800	3
9	26	(Australia) Jack Findlay	Hermetite Racing International	Suzuki	+1'23.500	2
10	14	(United Kingdom) John Williams	Team Appleby Glade	Suzuki	+1'23.700	1
11	24	(Italy) Armando Toracca	MC della Robbia	Suzuki	+1'32.000	
12	17	(Austria) Max Wiener	MSC Rottenberg	Suzuki	+1'44.700	
13	12	(United Kingdom) Dave Potter	Ted Broad	Suzuki	+2'11.700	
14	34	(South Africa) Leslie van Breda		Suzuki	+2'24.800	
15	39	(West Germany) Harald Merkl	Nava Kucera Racing Team	Yamaha	+2'27.000	
16	35	(West Germany) Hans-Otto Buteneth		Yamaha	+3'06.400	
17	53	(Denmark) Børge Nielsen		Suzuki	+3'13.400	
18	6	(Sweden) Bo Granath		Suzuki	+3'31.800	
19	54	(Netherlands) Willem Zoet		Suzuki	+3'32.900	
20	37	(West Germany) Franz Heller	Bromme GMHH Suzuki Racing	Suzuki	+3'42.800	
21	35	(Finland) Markku Matikainen	Länsivuori Team	Suzuki	+1 lap	
22	77	(Belgium) Jean-Philippe Orban	Jean-Philippe Orban Racing Team	Suzuki	+2 laps	
23	21	(France) Michel Rougerie		Suzuki	+2 laps	
24	20	(New Zealand) John Woodley		Suzuki	+3 laps	
25	23	(South Africa) Alan North	Wilddam Konserven Holland	Suzuki	+3 laps	
Ret	18	(Italy) Virginio Ferrari	Team Nava Olio Fiat	Suzuki	Retired	
Ret	17	(Italy) Gianfranco Bonera	Team Nava Olio Fiat	Suzuki	Retired	
Ret	??	(Italy) Giovanni Rolando		Suzuki	Retired	
Ret	??	(Austria) Karl Auer	MSC Rottenberg	Suzuki	Retired	
Ret	4	(Italy) Marco Lucchinelli	Life Racing Team	Suzuki	Retired	
Ret	??	(France) Jean-François Baldé		Yamaha	Retired	
Ret	6	(United Kingdom) John Newbold	Maurice Newbold	Suzuki	Retired	
Ret	??	(Netherlands) Kees van der Kruijs		Yamaha	Retired	
Ret	43	(West Germany) Helmut Kassner	Boeri Giudici Racing Team	Suzuki	Retired	
Ret	??	(Japan) Takazumi Katayama	Takazumi Katayama Sarome Team	Yamaha	Retired	
Ret	??	(Belgium) Hervé Regout	Hervé Regout	Yamaha	Retired	

== 250 cc classification ==
Pos	No.	Rider	Manufacturer	Laps	Time	Grid	Points
1	10	(Italy) Walter Villa	Harley-Davidson	10	41:24.9	1	15
2	32	(Japan) Takazumi Katayama	Yamaha	10	+19.2	8	12
3	66	(Italy) Mario Lega	Morbidelli	10	+27.2	3	10
4	34	(Japan) Masahiro Wada	Kawasaki	10	+39.2	10	8
5	35	(Australia) Vic Soussan	Yamaha	10	+43.3	4	6
6	1	(South Africa) Kork Ballington	Yamaha	10	+55.0		5
7	9	(Italy) Franco Uncini	Harley-Davidson	10	+58.0	2	4
8	22	(France) Patrick Fernandez	Yamaha	10	+1:04.5		3
9	6	(United Kingdom) Tom Herron	Yamaha	10	+1:12.2		2
10	4	(South Africa) Jon Ekerold	Yamaha	10	+1:12.7		1
11	3	(United Kingdom) Barry Ditchburn	Kawasaki	10	+1:12.9		
12	74	(France) Jean-Claude Meilland	Yamaha	10	+1:13.1		
13	7	(United Kingdom) Chas Mortimer	Yamaha	10	+1:22.3		
14	5	(United Kingdom) Mick Grant	Kawasaki	10	+1:41.3	7	
15	21	(France) Bernard Fau	Yamaha	10	+1:45.6		
16	69	(Italy) Pierluigi Conforti	Yamaha	10	+1:46.4		
17	58	(Germany) Walter Hoffmann	Yamaha	10	+1:54.7		
18	20	(France) Olivier Chevallier	Yamaha	10	+1:57.5		
19	60	(Belgium) O. Liegeois	Yamaha	10	+1:57.7		
20	11	(Denmark) Svend Andersson	Yamaha	10	+1:58.3		
		(Italy) Paolo Pileri	Morbidelli			5	
		(South Africa) Alan North	Yamaha			6	
		(Finland) Pentti Korhonen	Yamaha			9	
36 starters in total, 25 finishers

== 125 cc classification ==
Pos	No.	Rider	Manufacturer	Laps	Time	Grid	Points
1	1	(Italy) Pierpaolo Bianchi	Morbidelli	10	44:22.9	1	15
2	6	(Spain) Ángel Nieto	Bultaco	10	+13.6	3	12
3	20	(Germany) Anton Mang	Morbidelli	10	+26.7	4	10
4	4	(Italy) Eugenio Lazzarini	Morbidelli	10	+33.7	6	8
5	3	(Italy) Pierluigi Conforti	Morbidelli	10	+1:11.3	9	6
6	45	(Italy) Ermanno Giuliano	Morbidelli	10	+1:18.2		5
7	32	(Switzerland) Stefan Dörflinger	Morbidelli	10	+1:25.5	7	4
8	16	(Germany) Gert Bender	Bender	10	+1:25.9	5	3
9	25	(Netherlands) Cees van Dongen	Morbidelli	10	+1:37.4		2
10	8	(France) Jean-Louis Guignabodet	Morbidelli	10	+1:38.6		1
11	41	(Belgium) Julien van Zeebroeck	Morbidelli	10	+1:39.5	8	
12	35	(Switzerland) Hans Müller	Morbidelli	10	+1:40.1		
13	28	(Sweden) Per-Edward Carlson	Morbidelli	10	+2:05.7		
14	17	(Germany) Peter Frohnmeyer	DRS	10	+2:06.3		
15	12	(France) Patrick Plisson	Morbidelli	10	+2:17.3		
16	27	(Netherlands) Peter van Niel	Morbidelli	10	+2:55.5		
17	2	(Italy) Enrico Cereda	Morbidelli	10	+3:01.9		
18	30	(Sweden) Bengt Johansson	Morbidelli	10	+3:02.2		
19	44	(Italy) Maurizio Massimiani	Morbidelli	10	+3:11.2	10	
20	21	(Germany) Alfred Schmid	Morbidelli	10	+3:16.8		
		(Austria) Harald Bartol	Morbidelli			2	
36 starters in total, 25 finishers

== 50 cc classification ==
Pos	No.	Rider	Manufacturer	Laps	Time	Grid	Points
1	6	(Italy) Eugenio Lazzarini	Kreidler	6	31:12.2	3	15
2	21	(Germany) Herbert Rittberger	Kreidler	6	+0.5	4	12
3	1	(Spain) Ángel Nieto	Bultaco	6	+10.4	1	10
4	5	(Spain) Ricardo Tormo	Bultaco	6	+30.8	2	8
5	52	(Belgium) Julien van Zeebroeck	Kreidler	6	+54.8	5	6
6	19	(Switzerland) Rudolf Kunz	Kreidler	6	+1:19.0	8	5
7	28	(France) Patrick Plisson	ABF	6	+1:38.5		4
8	3	(Spain) Ramon Gali	Derbi	6	+1:38.7		3
9	41	(Belgium) Pierre Dumont	Kreidler	6	+1:49.9		2
10	18	(Germany) Hagen Klein	Kreidler	6	+1:51.0		1
11	33	(Austria) Otto Machinek	Kreidler	6	+1:52.8		
12	16	(Netherlands) Cees van Dongen	Kreidler	6	+1:53.3		
13	11	(Netherlands) Jaap Bosman	Kreidler	6	+1:53.8	9	
14	15	(Germany) Günter Schirnhofer	Kreidler	6	+2:07.1		
15	32	(Austria) Hans Hummel	Kreidler	6	+2:11.5	10	
16	55	(Germany) Ingo Emmerich	Kreidler	6	+2:29.0		
17	12	(Netherlands) Engelbert Kip	Kreidler	6	+2:40.3		
18	17	(Germany) Wolfgang Golembeck	Kreidler	6	+2:40.7		
19	37	(Belgium) Guido Delys	Kreidler	6	+2:55.4		
20	46	(Belgium) G. Muyters	Kreidler	6	+3:14.0		
		(Netherlands) Theo Timmer	Kreidler			6	
		(Switzerland) Stefan Dörflinger	Kreidler			7	
36 starters in total, 27 finishers

== Sidecar classification ==
Pos	No.	Rider	Passenger	Manufacturer	Laps	Time	Grid	Points
1	23	(Germany) Werner Schwärzel	(Germany) Andreas Huber	Aro	10	42:52.0	1	15
2	24	(Germany) Rolf Steinhausen	(Germany) Wolfgang Kalauch	Busch-Yamaha	10	+21.5	3	12
3	8	(United Kingdom) George O'Dell	(United Kingdom) Cliff Holland	Windle-Yamaha	10	+58.8	7	10
4	31	(Sweden) Göte Brodin	(Sweden) Bengt Forsberg	Windle-Yamaha	10	+1:05.0	9	8
5	9	(United Kingdom) Dick Greasley	(United Kingdom) Mick Skeels	Chell-Yamaha	10	+1:26.0	6	6
6	21	(Germany) Helmut Schilling	(Germany) Rainer Gundel	Aro	10	+1:27.7	5	5
7	30	(Netherlands) Cees Smit	(Netherlands) Jan Smit	König	10	+1:57.5		4
8	10	(United Kingdom) Mac Hobson	(United Kingdom) Stu Collins	Suzuki	10	+2:54.6		3
9	19	(Germany) Walter Ohrmann	(Germany) Bernd Grube	Yamaha	10	+3:19.1		2
10	15	(Germany) Ted Janssen	(Germany) Erich Schmitz	Colyam	10	+3:20.1		1
11	34	(Belgium) Marc Alexandre	(Belgium) Paul Gerard	Kova-König	10	+3:46.6		
12	5	(Switzerland) Jean-François Monnin	(Switzerland) Edouard Weber	Seymaz-Yamaha	10	+4:13.8		
13	18	(Germany) Heinz Luthringshauser	(Germany) Helmut Hahn	MKM	10	+4:21.5		
14	17	(Germany) Gustav Pape	(Germany) Franz Kellenberg	König	10	+4:37.2		
15	28	(Netherlands) Jaap Geerts	(Netherlands) Jan van Veen	König	9	+1 lap		
		(Switzerland) Rolf Biland	(United Kingdom) Kenny Williams	Schmid-Yamaha			2	
		(Switzerland) Bruno Holzer	(Switzerland) Charly Meierhans	LCR-Yamaha			4	
		(Germany) Siegfried Schauzu	(Germany) Lorenzo Puzo	Yamaha			8	
		(France) Alain Michel	(France) Gérard Lecorre	Yamaha			10	
30 starters in total, 18 finishers

Previous race: 1977 Dutch TT	FIM Grand Prix World Championship; 1977 season	Next race: 1977 Swedish Grand Prix
Previous race: 1976 Belgian Grand Prix	Belgian Grand Prix	Next race: 1978 Belgian Grand Prix
