= 1977 Grand Prix motorcycle racing season =

Sports season

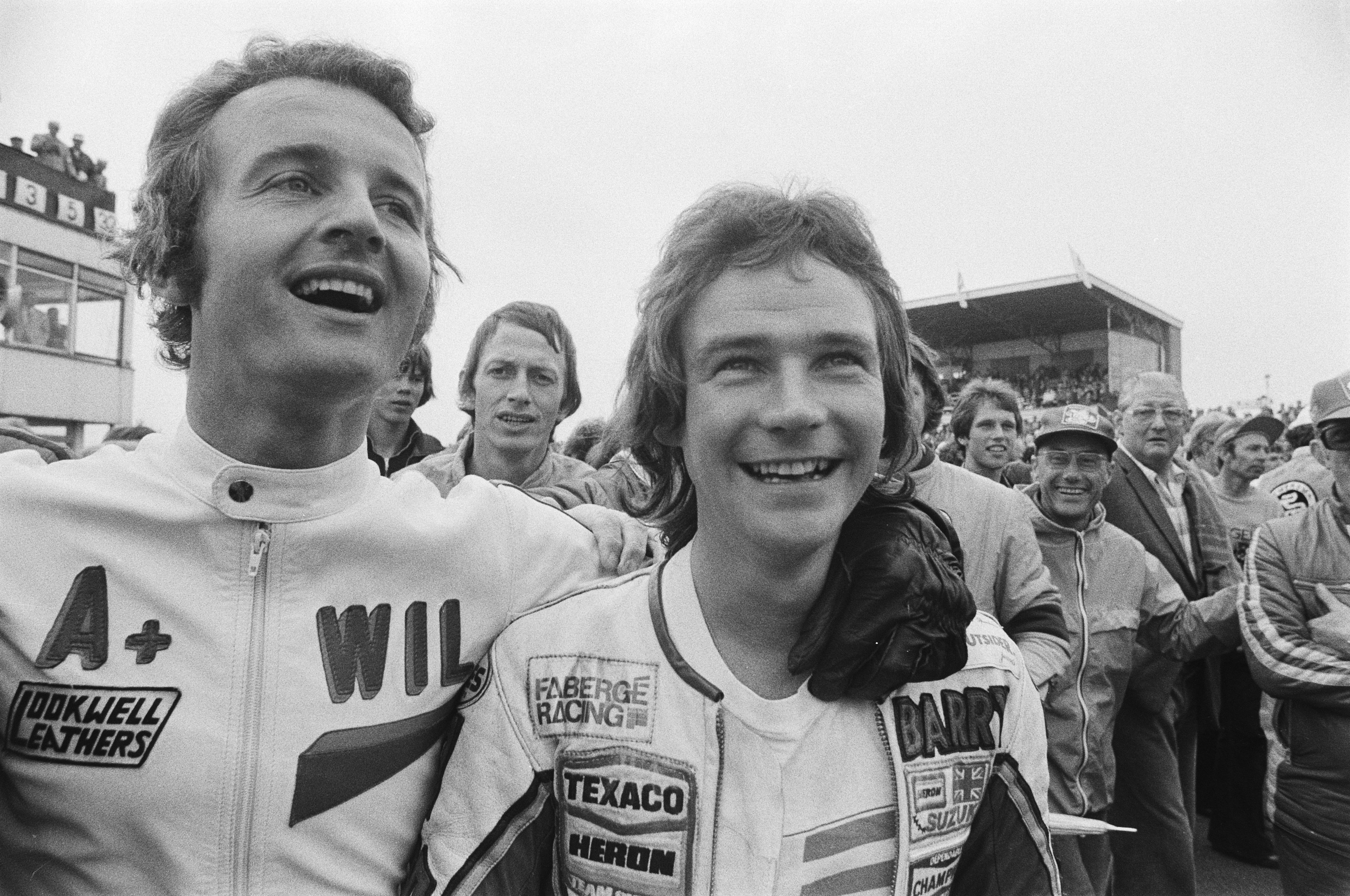
Barry Sheene (pictured in Assen next to Wil Hartog) became the 1977 500cc world champion

The 1977 Grand Prix motorcycle racing season was the 29th F.I.M. Road Racing World Championship season.

== Season summary ==
Suzuki rider Barry Sheene won six of ten rounds in 1977 to successfully defend his 500cc World Championship as the Suzuki RG 500 continued to dominate the championship. Virtually every privateer team chose to compete with the production version of the Suzuki motorcycle. The 1977 season marked the first time in Grand Prix motorcycle racing history that the Isle of Man TT was not part of the World Championships, as the event was moved to the Silverstone Circuit after a protracted rider boycott over the safety issues of the Isle of Man TT Mountain Course.

The season was marred by a serious accident at the 350cc Austrian Grand Prix race that claimed the life of Swiss rider, Hans Stadelmann and seriously injuring several other riders. The accident exposed a lack of medical assistance and led to a rider's strike. The incident highlighted the increasingly acrimonious relationship between competitors and race organizers over the lack of safety at race meetings. In November 1977, Honda made the surprising announcement that they would be returning to motorcycle Grand Prix racing in 1979 using four-stroke engine technology at a time when two-stroke engines dominated the sport.

=== Participants ===
The British-based Heron-Suzuki team served as the de facto factory team in the 500 Class with Sheene as their top rider. John Newbold and John Williams were released from their Suzuki contracts at the end of the 1976 season and replaced by Pat Hennen and Steve Parrish. Hennen was promoted to Suzuki's main team after an impressive rookie season in 1976 during which he became the first American competitor to win a 500cc Grand Prix race, while Parrish had won the 1976 ACU British championship.

The Yamaha factory returned to the World Championships after a one-year hiatus, providing new motorcycles for three satellite teams. Fifteen-time World Champion Giacomo Agostini's Marlboro-backed team, Johnny Cecotto's Venemotos team, and Steve Baker's Yamaha of Canada team all received the latest version of the Yamaha YZR500. Cecotto was the 1975 350cc World Champion, while Baker was making his World Championship debut after having won two AMA national races in 1976 as well as the prestigious Mallory Park Race of the Year.

=== 500 class championship ===
Sheene established his dominance at the season-opening Venezuelan Grand Prix with a victory over Baker and Hennen. Baker showed that he was a contender for the title by sharing the fastest lap time of the race with Sheene in just the first Grand Prix race of his career.

The second round at the Salzburgring circuit in Austria was marred by crash during the 350cc race that claimed the life of Swiss rider, Hans Stadelmann and seriously injured Johnny Cecotto, Patrick Fernandez, Dieter Braun and Franco Uncini. The lack of onsite medical facilities exacerbated the situation and exposed the race organizers' callousness and indifference regarding the safety of competitors. Sheene and most other 500 class riders refused to race, despite the race organizers offering riders double the usual start money. The race organizers pressed on with the race as Jack Findlay won from a reduced field of competitors. Cecotto sustained a broken arm in the accident and missed five rounds while recovering from his injury, while Braun decided to end his racing career after recovering from his injuries.

Sheene continued to set the pace with another victory at the German Grand Prix ahead of his Suzuki teammate Hennen in second as Baker finished in third place. At the fourth round at the Imola Circuit in Italy, Sheene won again while Virginio Ferrari scored an impressive second place for the Roberto Gallina-Suzuki team. Baker finished fourth behind Armando Toracca (Suzuki), while Hennen crashed out of the race when a newly designed fairing he was using touched the ground.

Baker claimed the pole position at the 500cc French Grand Prix, but he was unable to stop Sheene from winning his third consecutive race. At the age of 35, Giacomo Agostini showed that he was still competitive when he finished the French Grand Prix in second place ahead of Baker in third place.

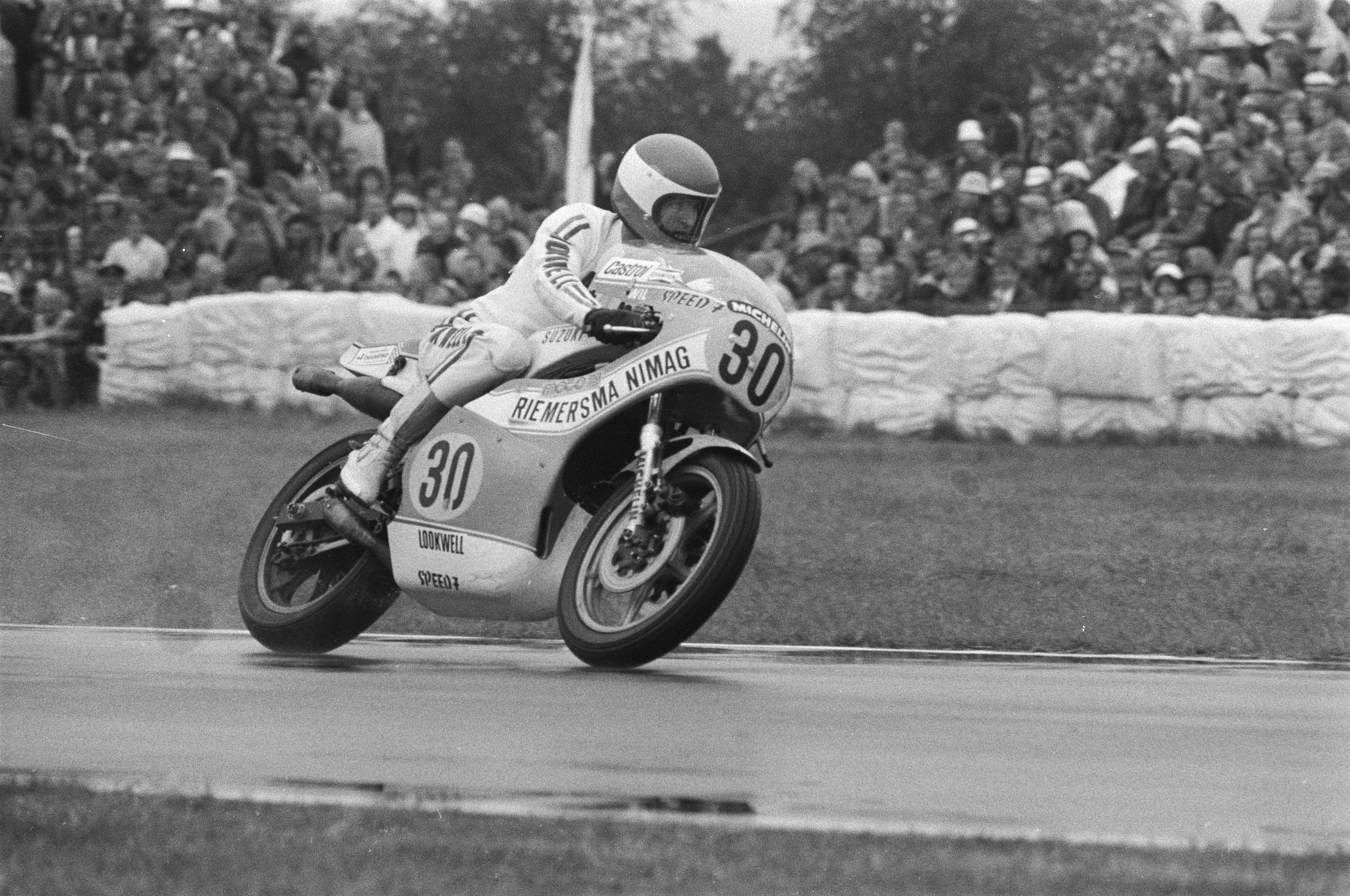
Wil Hartog (30) in action during the 1977 500cc Dutch TT.

Wil Hartog made history at the 1977 Dutch TT when he became the first Dutchman ever to win a premier 500cc Grand Prix. His Suzuki teammates Sheene and Hennen finished second and third.

Sheene's victory in the 1977 Belgian Grand Prix marked the fastest motorcycle Grand Prix race in history with an average race speed of 135.067 mph (217.369 kph). The following year, the Spa-Francorchamps road course was replaced by a shorter, safer track, meaning that Sheene's record could never be broken. At the following round in Sweden, Sheene clinched the World Championship with his sixth victory of the season. Johnny Cecotto returned from his injury to finish the race in second place, 2.9 seconds behind Sheene while Baker came in third place.

Cecotto won Round 9 in Finland ahead of Marco Lucchinelli and Franco Bonera, with Sheene finishing in sixth place as his Suzuki overheated. Baker faltered in twelfth place with spark plug problems, while Hennen failed to finish when his motorcycle's clutch failed, ruining his chances of finishing the championship in the runner-up spot. Cecotto won again in Czechoslovakia where he scored a double with victories in both the 350 and 500 classes. Agostini scored another second-place result in Czechoslovakia ahead of Michel Rougerie and Hennen. At the final race of the season in Britain, Sheene was leading the race when he was forced to quit with a mechanical failure which allowed his teammate Parish to claim the lead ahead of John Williams with Hennen in third place. As they began the final lap, Parrish crashed out of the lead, and then Williams did the same three corners later, handing Hennen his second career Grand Prix victory.

Sheene and Suzuki dominated the season by winning six of the first eight races, to finish well clear of Baker in second place. In just his first season in World Championship competition, Baker ranked second despite never having raced in the rain before and having no prior knowledge of European racing circuits. He also had no previous experience with the FIM regulations that required races to be started with dead engines, making competitors push start their machines. Baker's Yamaha did not start as easily as the numerous Suzuki riders surrounding him meaning that he usually began most races behind his competitors. Despite finishing second to Sheene in the 500 Class and winning the Formula 750 championship, Yamaha only offered Baker a contract to compete in the American national championship in 1978.

Hennen finished in third place for the second consecutive year despite facing animosity from his Suzuki teammate Sheene. Sheene recognized Hennen as a threat to his position at the top of the team's hierarchy and reacted by commandeering the best equipment for himself. Cecotto's late season victories vaulted him into fourth place ahead of Steve Parrish in fifth.

Giacomo Agostini failed to win a Grand Prix for the first time since 1964. In the final season of his accomplished career, he was still competitive with two second place finishes in the 500 championship and another second place in the 350 championship. Agostini ended the 1977 season ranked 6th in the 500 class and 16th in the 350 class. He won the final race of his career on September 25, 1977 at the final round of the 1977 Formula 750 Championship held at the Hockenheimring. Agostini then announced his retirement from motorcycle competition at the age of 35, having scored 159 podiums, 122 Grand Prix victories and 15 World Championships.

=== Smaller classes ===
After losing the 350 World Championship to the Harley-Davidson team in 1976, Yamaha reclaimed the title with Takazumi Katayama riding a unique, three-cylinder motorcycle developed at Yamaha's European headquarters in the Netherlands by Ferry Brouwer, Trevor Tilbury and former 125 World Champion, Kent Andersson. Katayama won five races during the season, far outpacing second placed Tom Herron (Yamaha). Katayama's victory marked the first time that an Asian competitor had won an FIM World Championship.

Morbidelli factory rider Mario Lega won the 250cc World Championship, ending the three-year reign of the Harley-Davidson-owned Aermacchi team and their rider Walter Villa. The season was one of the most competitive in years with seven different race winners in the first seven races of the year. Lega began the season as a substitute rider, filling in for the injured Paolo Pileri, the 1975 125cc World Champion. However, after his surprise victory over Takazumi Katayama at the 250cc Yugoslavian Grand Prix vaulted him into the championship points lead, team owner Giancarlo Morbidelli asked Lega to remain on the team for the remainder of the season. When Mick Grant won the 250cc Dutch TT for the Kawasaki team, it marked the fourth manufacturer to claim a 250 class victory in 1977 (Harley-Davidson, Yamaha and Morbidelli were the other three). Lega scored three more podiums to clinch the 250cc World Championship ahead of Harley-Davidson teammates, Franco Uncini and Walter Villa. Eight different competitors claimed victories during the season.

Morbidelli rider Pier Paolo Bianchi successfully defended his 125cc title with his teammate Eugenio Lazzarini finishing second. His victory made for an impressive double World Championship in the 125cc and 250cc divisions for the tiny Morbidelli factory. Angel Nieto won his third consecutive 50cc title while riding for the Bultaco factory team.

In addition to crash-marred Austrian Grand Prix, the Yugoslavian Grand Prix at the notorious Opatija Circuit was also stricken by tragedy. After having been issued an ultimatum by the FIM, the Yugoslavian race organizers failed to take action to improve the safety of the circuit – which was notorious for its numerous road-side hazards including solid rock walls and steep, barely protected drop offs. The event was a disaster with Italian rider, Giovanni Ziggiotto, crashing during practice for the 250cc race when his motorcycle's engine seized and he was hit from behind by Per-Edward Carlson. Ziggiotto died four days later in a hospital. During the 50 cc race, Ulrich Graf crashed when his bike developed a rear tire puncture and he was thrown into a stone wall. He suffered serious head injuries and died later in a hospital. The Opatija Circuit was never used again for any kind of racing and, the Yugoslavian Grand Prix was moved to the nearby Rijeka permanent circuit.

== 1977 Grand Prix season calendar ==
Round	Date	Race	Location	50cc winner	125cc winner	250cc winner	350cc winner	500cc winner	Report
1	March 20	(Venezuela) Venezuelan Grand Prix	San Carlos		(Spain) Ángel Nieto	(Italy) Walter Villa	(Venezuela) Johnny Cecotto	(United Kingdom) Barry Sheene	Report
2	May 1	(Austria) Austrian Grand Prix	Salzburgring		(Italy) Eugenio Lazzarini		Race cancelled (Note: The 350cc race was abandoned after eight laps following Hans Stadelmann's fatal accident.)	(Australia) Jack Findlay	Report
3	May 8	(West Germany) German Grand Prix	Hockenheim	(West Germany) Herbert Rittberger	(Italy) Pier Paolo Bianchi	(France) Christian Sarron	(Japan) Takazumi Katayama	(United Kingdom) Barry Sheene	Report
4	May 15	(Italy) Nations Grand Prix	Imola	(Italy) Eugenio Lazzarini	(Italy) Pier Paolo Bianchi	(Italy) Franco Uncini	(South Africa) Alan North	(United Kingdom) Barry Sheene	Report
5	May 22	(Spain) Spanish Grand Prix	Jarama	(Spain) Ángel Nieto	(Italy) Pier Paolo Bianchi	(Japan) Takazumi Katayama	(France) Michel Rougerie		Report
6	May 29	(France) French Grand Prix	Paul Ricard		(Italy) Pier Paolo Bianchi	(South Africa) Jon Ekerold	(Japan) Takazumi Katayama	(United Kingdom) Barry Sheene	Report
7	June 19	(Socialist Federal Republic of Yugoslavia) Yugoslavian Grand Prix	Opatija	(Spain) Ángel Nieto	(Italy) Pier Paolo Bianchi	(Italy) Mario Lega	(Japan) Takazumi Katayama		Report
8	June 25	(Netherlands) Dutch TT	Assen	(Spain) Ángel Nieto	(Spain) Ángel Nieto	(United Kingdom) Mick Grant	(South Africa) Kork Ballington	(Netherlands) Wil Hartog	Report
9	July 3	(Belgium) Belgian Grand Prix	Spa	(Italy) Eugenio Lazzarini	(Italy) Pier Paolo Bianchi	(Italy) Walter Villa		(United Kingdom) Barry Sheene	Report
10	July 24	(Sweden) Swedish Grand Prix	Anderstorp	(Spain) Ricardo Tormo	(Spain) Ángel Nieto	(United Kingdom) Mick Grant	(Japan) Takazumi Katayama	(United Kingdom) Barry Sheene	Report
11	July 31	(Finland) Finnish Grand Prix	Imatra		(Italy) Pier Paolo Bianchi	(Italy) Walter Villa	(Japan) Takazumi Katayama	(Venezuela) Johnny Cecotto	Report
12	August 7	(Czechoslovakia) Czechoslovak Grand Prix	Brno			(Italy) Franco Uncini	(Venezuela) Johnny Cecotto	(Venezuela) Johnny Cecotto	Report
13	August 14	(United Kingdom) British Grand Prix	Silverstone		(Italy) Pierluigi Conforti	(South Africa) Kork Ballington	(South Africa) Kork Ballington	(United States) Pat Hennen	Report

== Participants ==
=== 500cc participants ===
Team	Constructor	Motorcycle	No.	Rider	Rounds
Yamoto Marlboro	Yamaha	Yamaha YZR500 (OW35)	1; 10	(Italy) Giacomo Agostini	4–11
Life Racing Team	Suzuki	???	2	(Finland) Teuvo Länsivuori	4–7, 9–11
Life Racing Team	Suzuki	???	4; 19	(Italy) Marco Lucchinelli	4–7, 9–11
Texaco Heron Team Suzuki	Suzuki	Suzuki RGA500	3	(United States) Pat Hennen	1, 3–11
Texaco Heron Team Suzuki	Suzuki	Suzuki RGA500	7	(United Kingdom) Barry Sheene	1, 3–9, 11
Texaco Heron Team Suzuki	Suzuki	Suzuki RGA500	21; 1	(United Kingdom) Steve Parrish	1, 3–11
???	Suzuki	Suzuki RG 500	6	(Switzerland) Philippe Coulon	1, 3–7
Hermetite Racing International	Suzuki	???	8	(Australia) Jack Findlay	2–4, 7–8, 11
Hermetite Racing International	Suzuki	???	24	(United Kingdom) Alex George	2, 11
Elf	Suzuki	???	12; 16	(France) Michel Rougerie	6, 8–10
Team Nava-Olio Fiat	Suzuki	???	12; 14	(Italy) Virginio Ferrari	1, 4–6
Team Nava-Olio Fiat	Suzuki	Suzuki RG 500	22; 13	(Italy) Gianfranco Bonera	3, 5, 8–11
Venemotos	Yamaha	Yamaha YZR500 (OW35)	14; 19	(Venezuela) Johnny Cecotto	1, 10–13
Ceramiche Della Robbia	Suzuki	???	15	(Italy) Armando Toracca	4–6, 8–9
Riemersma	Suzuki	???	22	(Netherlands) Wil Hartog	3–11
Yamaha International	Yamaha	Yamaha YZR500 (OW35)	25; 32	(United States) Steve Baker	1, 3–11
Boeri Dainese Guidici Racing Team	Suzuki	???	37	(West Germany) Helmut Kassner	2, 10
MSC Rottenegg	Suzuki	???	46	(Austria) Max Wiener	2–3, 10–11

Key
Regular Rider
Wildcard Rider
Replacement Rider

== Final standings ==
=== Scoring system ===
Points were awarded to the top ten finishers in each race. All races counted towards the final standings.

(key)

Position	1st	2nd	3rd	4th	5th	6th	7th	8th	9th	10th
Points	15	12	10	8	6	5	4	3	2	1

=== 500cc final standings ===
Place	Rider	Team	Machine	VEN (Venezuela)	AUT (Austria)	GER (West Germany)	NAT (Italy)	FRA (France)	NED (Netherlands)	BEL (Belgium)	SWE (Sweden)	FIN (Finland)	CZE (Czech Republic)	GBR (United Kingdom)	Points
1	(United Kingdom) Barry Sheene	Heron-Suzuki	RG500	1	DNS	1	1	1	2	1	1	6		Ret	107
2	(United States) Steve Baker	Yamaha of Canada	YZR500	2	DNS	3	4	3	5	2	3	12	Ret	2	80
3	(United States) Pat Hennen	Heron-Suzuki	RG500	3	DNS	2	Ret	10	3	3	10	Ret	4	1	67
4	(Venezuela) Johnny Cecotto	Venemotos Yamaha	YZR500	4							2	1	1	Ret	50
5	(United Kingdom) Steve Parrish	Heron-Suzuki	RG500	9	DNS	4	11	6	Ret	5	4	5	7	Ret	39
6	(Italy) Giacomo Agostini	Team API Marlboro	YZR500		DNS	Ret	5	2	Ret	8	9	Ret	2	9	37
6	(Italy) Franco Bonera	Team Nava Olio Fiat	RG500	Ret	DNS	12		4	Ret	Ret	6	3	5	4	37
8	(Switzerland) Philippe Coulon	Marlboro Masche Total	RG500	5	DNS	5	6	5	4	6	DNS				36
9	(Finland) Teuvo Länsivuori	Life Racing Team	RG500	Ret	DNS	Ret	12	7	7	4	Ret	7	6	3	35
10	(Netherlands) Wil Hartog	Riemersma Racing	RG500		DNS	6	DNS	Ret	1	7	5	Ret	Ret	Ret	30
11	(Italy) Marco Lucchinelli	Life Racing Team	RG500	7	DNS	7	Ret	Ret	6	Ret	Ret	2	Ret		25
12	(Italy) Virginio Ferrari	Team Nava Olio Fiat	RG500	6	Ret		2	8	10	Ret	Ret	Ret	Ret		21
12	(France) Michel Rougerie	Elf	RG500		DNS	Ret	DNS	Ret	8	23	11	4	3	Ret	21
12	(Italy) Armando Toracca	MC della Robbia	RG500		Ret	Ret	3	9	9	11	7	8	Ret		21
15	(Austria) Max Wiener	MSC Rottenberg	RG500		2	9	14	Ret	17	12	12		8	8	20
16	(Australia) Jack Findlay	Hermetite Racing International	RG500		1	13	Ret	Ret		9	14	Ret	Ret	Ret	17
17	(United Kingdom) Alex George	Hermetite Racing International	RG500		3	14	15	Ret			16	13	11	6	12
15	(West Germany) Helmut Kassner	Boeri Giudici Racing Team	RG500		4	16			Ret	Ret	Ret		10	11	9
19	(United Kingdom) Steve Wright		RG500											5	6
19	(West Germany) Franz Heller	Bromme GMHH Suzuki Racing	RG500		5	19				20			13		6
19	(France) Christian Estrosi	Marlboro Masche Total	RG500	8	DNS	Ret	8	11	Ret		Ret	Ret		Ret	6
22	(Austria) Michael Schmid	Racing Team Albatros	RG500		6								19		5
23	(United Kingdom) John Newbold	Maurice Newbold	RG500		DNS	15	7	Ret	12	Ret	Ret			Ret	4
23	(United Kingdom) Derek Chatterton		RG500											7	4
23	(West Germany) Anton Mang	Valvoline Racing Hamburg	RG500			8	10	Ret			Ret				4
23	(United Kingdom) John Williams	Team Appleby Glade	RG500		DNS	Ret	16	Ret	Ret	10	8	Ret	Ret	Ret	4
27	(Netherlands) Boet Van Dulmen	Pullshaw	RG500		Ret	10	9	12					Ret	Ret	3
28	(Belgium) Jean Philippe Orban	Orban Racing Team	RG500		DNS	21	17	16	16	22	Ret	9	Ret		2
28	(West Germany) Franz Rau		RG500			18			Ret				9	Ret	2
30	(South Africa) Alan North	Wilddam Konserven Holland	RG500	10						25					1
30	(Austria) Karl Auer	MSC Rottenberg	RG500			DNS		Ret	DNS	Ret	Ret	10	Ret		1
30	(United Kingdom) Kevin Wrettom		RG500											10	1

=== 350cc standings ===
Place	Rider	Number	Country	Machine	Points	Wins
1	(Japan) Takazumi Katayama	7	Japan	Yamaha	95	5
2	(United Kingdom) Tom Herron	4	United Kingdom	Yamaha	56	0
3	(South Africa) Jon Ekerold		South Africa	Yamaha	54	0
4	(France) Michel Rougerie		France	Yamaha	50	1
5	(South Africa) Kork Ballington		South Africa	Yamaha	46	2
6	(France) Olivier Chevallier	9	France	Yamaha	39	0
7	(France) Christian Sarron		France	Yamaha	38	0
8	(France) Patrick Fernandez		France	Yamaha	34	0
9	(Venezuela) Johnny Cecotto	2	Venezuela	Yamaha	30	2
10	(South Africa) Alan North		South Africa	Yamaha	30	1
11	Bruno Kneubühler				24	
12	Victor Soussan				21	
13	Penti Korhonen				20	
14	Pekka Nurmi				18	
15	Victor Palomo				18	
16	Giacomo Agostini				16	
17	Patrick Pons				15	
18	Walter Villa				14	
19	Mario Lega				12	
20	Franco Uncini				11	
21	John Dodds				11	
22	John Williams				10	
23	Eero Hyvärinen				10	
24	Eddie Roberts				8	
25	Philip Bouzanne				6	
26	Alan Stewart				6	
27	P.Mezerhane				4	
28	Seppo Rossi				4	
29	Helmut Kassner				4	
30	Michel Frutschi				4	
31	Jean Claude Hogrel				3	
32	C.Bellon				3	
33	Tapio Virtanen				3	
34	Eduardo Aleman				2	
35	D.Boulom				2	
36	A.Hockley				1	
37	R.Tausani				1	
38	John Newbold				1	
39	Karl Auer				1	
40	Chas Mortimer				1	

=== 250cc standings ===
Place	Rider	Number	Country	Machine	Points	Wins
1	(Italy) Mario Lega		Italy	Morbidelli	85	1
2	(Italy) Franco Uncini		Italy	Harley-Davidson	72	2
3	(Italy) Walter Villa	1	Italy	Harley-Davidson	67	3
4	(Japan) Takazumi Katayama		Japan	Yamaha	58	1
5	(United Kingdom) Tom Herron	4	United Kingdom	Yamaha	54	0
6	(South Africa) Kork Ballington		South Africa	Yamaha	49	1
7	(South Africa) Alan North	6	South Africa	Yamaha	43	0
8	(United Kingdom) Mick Grant		United Kingdom	Kawasaki	42	2
9	(South Africa) Jon Ekerold		South Africa	Yamaha	42	1
10	(France) Patrick Fernandez		France	Yamaha	28	0
11	Barry Ditchburn				27	
12	Victor Soussan				25	
13	Olivier Chevallier				25	
14	(France) Christian Sarron				23	1
15	Aldo Nannini				19	
16	Penti Korhonen				15	
17	(Japan) Akihiko Kiyohara			Kawasaki	14	
18	Guy Bertin				11	
19	Pekka Nurmi				11	
20	Victor Palomo				10	
21	Eric Saul				10	
22	John Dodds				9	
23	Vinicio Salmi				8	
24	(Japan) Masahiro Wada			Kawasaki	8	
25	Pierluigi Conforti				6	
26	Bruno Kneubühler				6	
27	Michel Rougerie				6	
28	Chas Mortimer				5	
29	(France) Jean-François Baldé				4	
30	Eero Hyvärinen				3	
31	Philip Bouzanne				2	
32	Paolo Pileri				2	
33	(France) Patrick Pons			Yamaha	2	
34	M.Corradini				1	
35	Vanes Francini				1	

=== 125cc standings ===
Place	Rider	Number	Country	Machine	Points	Wins
1	(Italy) Pier Paolo Bianchi	1	Italy	Morbidelli	131	7
2	(Italy) Eugenio Lazzarini	7	Italy	Morbidelli	105	1
3	(Spain) Angel Nieto	2	Spain	Bultaco	80	3
4	(France) Jean-Louis Guignabodet	6	France	Morbidelli	62	0
5	(West Germany) Anton Mang	5	West Germany	Morbidelli	55	0
6	(West Germany) Gert Bender		West Germany	Bender	38	0
7	(Austria) Harald Bartol		Austria	Morbidelli	32	0
8	(Switzerland) Hans Müller		Switzerland	Morbidelli	32	0
9	(Switzerland) Stefan Dörflinger		Switzerland	Morbidelli	32	0
10	(Italy) Pierluigi Conforti		Italy	Morbidelli	30	1
11	Maurizio Massimiani				22	
12	Giuseppe Zigiotto				21	
13	Julien Van Zeebroeck				20	
14	Ivan Carlsson				14	
15	Ermanno Giuliano				11	
16	Iván Palazzese				10	
17	Sauro Pazzaglia				9	
18	Rino Pretelli				8	
19	Claudio Lusuardi				8	
20	Matti Kinnunen				7	
21	Thierry Noblesse				6	
22	Willy Perez				5	
23	Johann Parzer				5	
24	Rolf Blatter				5	
25	B.Johansson				5	
26	Cees Van Dongen				5	
27	Horst Seel				4	
28	Rafael Olavarria				4	
29	Janos Drapal				4	
30	Thierry Espié				4	
31	Werner Schmied				3	
32	G.Willi				2	
33	Jan Huberts				2	
34	Patrick Plisson				2	
35	Enrico Cereda				1	
36	Paolo Cipriani				1	
37	J.Novarrete				1	

=== 50cc standings ===
Place	Rider	Number	Country	Machine	Points	Wins
1	(Spain) Angel Nieto	1	Spain	Bultaco	87	3
2	(Italy) Eugenio Lazzarini	4	Italy	Kreidler	72	2
3	(Spain) Ricardo Tormo		Spain	Bultaco	69	1
4	(West Germany) Herbert Rittberger	2	West Germany	Kreidler	53	1
5	(France) Patrick Plisson		France	ABF	26	0
6	(Switzerland) Stefan Dörflinger	7	Switzerland	Kreidler	26	0
7	(France) Jean-Louis Guignabodet		France	Morbidelli	14	0
8	(Austria) Hans Hummel	9	Austria	Kreidler	11	0
9	(Belgium) Julien van Zeebroeck	6	Belgium	Kreidler	10	0
10	(Spain) Ramon Gali		Spain	Derbi	10	0
11	Ulrich Graf				9
12	Hagen Klein				9
13	Cees Van Dongen				8
14	Theo Timmer				8
15	Aldo Pero				7
16	Günter Schirnhofer				7
17	Rolf Blatter				6
18	Rudolf Kunz				5
19	Claudio Lusuardi				5
20	Wolfgang Müller				4
21	Engelbert Kip				3
22	Adrijan Bernetic				3
23	Lennart Lundgren				2
24	Ingo Emmerich				2
25	C.Dumont				2
26	E.Mischiatti				2
27	Juup Bosman				1
28	J.Novarrete				1
29	Peter Looijensteijn				1
30	Jacques Hutteau				1

== See also ==
- 1977 Formula 750 season
