= 1977 Austrian motorcycle Grand Prix =

(Austria) 1977 Austrian Grand Prix
Race details
- Race 2 of 13 races in the 1977 Grand Prix motorcycle racing season
- Date: 1 May 1977
- Official name: Austrian Grand Prix/Grosser Preis von Österreich
- Location: Salzburgring
- Course: Permanent racing facility; 4.241 km (2.635 mi)

500cc
Pole position
Rider	(United Kingdom) Barry Sheene	
Time	1:23.200	
Fastest lap
Rider	(Australia) Jack Findlay	Suzuki
Time	1:25.970	
Podium
First	(Australia) Jack Findlay	
Second	(Austria) Max Wiener	
Third	(United Kingdom) Alex George	

350cc
Pole position
Rider	(Venezuela) Johnny Cecotto	Yamaha
Time	1:26.310	
Podium
First	N/A (Race abandoned)	
Second	N/A (Race abandoned)	
Third	N/A (Race abandoned)	

125cc
Pole position
- Rider: (Spain) Ángel Nieto
- Time: 1:35.100
Fastest lap
- Rider: (Italy) Eugenio Lazzarini
- Time: 1:35.200
Podium
- First: (Italy) Eugenio Lazzarini
- Second: (Italy) Pierpaolo Bianchi
- Third: (Austria) Harald Bartol

Sidecar (B2A)
Pole position
- Rider: (Switzerland) Rolf Biland
- Passenger: (United Kingdom) Ken Williams
- Time: 1:30.080
Fastest lap
- Rider: (Switzerland) Rolf Biland
- Passenger: (United Kingdom) Ken Williams
- Time: 1:31.660
Podium
- First rider: (Switzerland) Rolf Biland
- First passenger: (United Kingdom) Ken Williams
- Second rider: (United Kingdom) George O'Dell
- Second passenger: (United Kingdom) Kenny Arthur
- Third rider: (France) Alain Michel
- Third passenger: (France) Gérard Lecorre

The 1977 Austrian motorcycle Grand Prix was the second round of the 1977 Grand Prix motorcycle racing season. It took place on 1 May 1977 at the Salzburgring circuit.

The opening race was for the 350 cc category. This race was abandoned after eight laps following an accident which led to the death of Hans Stadelmann from head injuries, and seriously injured Johnny Cecotto, Patrick Fernandez, Dieter Braun and Franco Uncini. The 125 cc race was due to run after the 350 cc race, but the 125 cc riders staged a sitdown strike and there was a delay before their race took place. Riders in the 500 cc category organised a boycott of their race which led to only 14 competitors taking part. The FIM, motorcycle racing's governing body, initially issued formal warnings to Barry Sheene and Ángel Nieto but later in the year the punishments were retracted.

== 500cc classification ==
Pos.	No.	Rider	Team	Manufacturer	Time/Retired	Points
1	8	(Australia) Jack Findlay	Hermetite Racing International	Suzuki	51'19.260	15
2	24	(Austria) Max Wiener	MSC Rottenberg	Suzuki	+15.400	12
3	29	(United Kingdom) Alex George	Hermetite Racing International	Suzuki	+15.910	10
4	20	(West Germany) Helmut Kassner	Boeri Giudici Racing Team	Suzuki	+25.360	8
5	48	(West Germany) Franz Heller	Bromme GMHH Suzuki Racing	Suzuki	+1 lap	6
6	33	(Austria) Michael Schmid		Suzuki	+3 laps	5
NC	10	(Netherlands) Marcel Ankoné	Racing Team Albatros	Suzuki	+16 laps	
Ret	??	(Austria) Werner Nenning		Suzuki	Retired	
Ret	??	(Sweden) Bo Granath		Suzuki	Retired	
Ret	12	(Italy) Virginio Ferrari	Team Nava Olio Fiat	Suzuki	Retired	
Ret	??	(Finland) Markku Matikainen	Lansivuori Team	Suzuki	Retired	
Ret	??	(New Zealand) Stuart Avant	Sid Griffiths Racing	Suzuki	Retired	
Ret	??	(Italy) Armando Toracca	MC della Robbia	Suzuki	Retired	
Ret	??	(Netherlands) Boet van Dulmen	Pullshaw	Suzuki	Retired	
DNS	3	(United States) Pat Hennen	Texaco Heron Team Suzuki	Suzuki	Did not start	
DNS	7	(United Kingdom) Barry Sheene	Texaco Heron Team Suzuki	Suzuki	Did not start	
DNS	16	(Switzerland) Philippe Coulon	Marlboro Masche Total	Suzuki	Did not start	
DNS	4	(France) Christian Estrosi	Marlboro Masche Total	Suzuki	Did not start	
DNS	19	(Italy) Marco Lucchinelli	Life Racing Team	Suzuki	Did not start	
DNS	8	(United Kingdom) Steve Parrish	Texaco Heron Team Suzuki	Suzuki	Did not start	
DNS	??	(Italy) Gianfranco Bonera	Team Nava Olio Fiat	Suzuki	Did not start	
DNS	??	(Netherlands) Wil Hartog	Riemersma Racing	Suzuki	Did not start	
DNS	??	(United Kingdom) John Williams	Team Appleby Glade	Suzuki	Did not start	
DNS	??	(Finland) Teuvo Länsivuori	Life Racing Team	Suzuki	Did not start	
DNS	??	(Italy) Gianni Rolando		Suzuki	Did not start	
DNS	??	(United Kingdom) John Newbold	Maurice Newbold	Suzuki	Did not start	
DNS	??	(France) Michel Rougerie		Suzuki	Did not start	
DNS	??	(Belgium) Jean-Philippe Orban	Jean-Philippe Orban Racing Team	Suzuki	Did not start	
DNS	??	(West Germany) Dieter Braun		Suzuki	Did not start	
DNS	??	(United Kingdom) Chas Mortimer		Suzuki	Did not start	
DNS	32	(United States) Steve Baker	Yamaha Motor Company	Yamaha	Did not start	
DNS	20	(Venezuela) Johnny Cecotto	Team Venemotos	Yamaha	Did not start	
DNS	??	(Italy) Giacomo Agostini	Team API Marlboro	Yamaha	Did not start	
DNS	17	(United Kingdom) Tom Herron		Yamaha	Did not start	

== 125 cc classification ==
Pos	No.	Rider	Manufacturer	Laps	Time	Grid	Points
1	7	(Italy) Eugenio Lazzarini	Morbidelli	30	48:14.90	3	15
2	1	(Italy) Pierpaolo Bianchi	Morbidelli	30	+49.98	2	12
3	17	(Austria) Harald Bartol	Morbidelli	30	+58.97	4	10
4	44	(Italy) Pierluigi Conforti	Morbidelli	30	+1:08.28	6	8
5	9	(Switzerland) Stefan Dörflinger	Morbidelli	30	+1:26.66	5	6
6	16	(Switzerland) Hans Müller	Morbidelli	30	+1:26.73	7	5
7	25	(Hungary) János Drapál	Morbidelli	29	+1 lap	13	4
8	46	(Sweden) Per-Edward Carlsson	Morbidelli	29	+1 lap	18	3
9	22	(Switzerland) Rolf Blatter	Morbidelli	29	+1 lap	10	2
10	31	(Austria) Johann Parzer	Morbidelli	29	+1 lap	20	1
11	21	(Finland) Matti Kinnunen	Morbidelli	29	+1 lap	16	
12	24	(Sweden) Hans Hallberg	Morbidelli	29	+1 lap		
13	37	(France) Thierry Noblesse	Morbidelli	29	+1 lap	17	
14	15	(Austria) Hans Hummel	Morbidelli	29	+1 lap	19	
15	20	(Austria) Hans Zemsauer	Morbidelli	29	+1 lap	11	
16	26	(Austria) August Auinger	Morbidelli	29	+1 lap		
17	14	(Netherlands) Cees van Dongen	Morbidelli	28	+2 laps		
18	45	(Netherlands) Jan Ubels	Morbidelli	28	+2 laps		
19	41	(Germany) Alfred Schmid	Morbidelli	28	+2 laps		
20	5	(Germany) Anton Mang	Morbidelli	28	+2 laps	9	
21	12	(Germany) Walter Koschine	Morbidelli	27	+3 laps		
22	33	(Switzerland) Marc Constantin	Morbidelli	27	+3 laps		
		(Spain) Ángel Nieto	Bultaco			1	
		(Germany) Gert Bender	Bender			8	
		(Switzerland) Xaver Tschannen	Bender			12	
		(Austria) Ernst Fagerer	Morbidelli			14	
		(France) Jean-Louis Guignabodet	Morbidelli			15	
36 starters in total

== Sidecar classification ==
Pos	No.	Rider	Passenger	Manufacturer	Laps	Time	Grid	Points
1	4	(Switzerland) Rolf Biland	(United Kingdom) Kenny Williams	Schmid-Yamaha	30	47:01.41	1	15
2	8	(United Kingdom) George O'Dell	(United Kingdom) Kenny Arthur	Windle-Yamaha	30	+23.33	5	12
3	32	(France) Alain Michel	(France) Gérard Lecorre	Yamaha	30	+48.65	3	10
4	4	(Sweden) Göte Brodin	(Sweden) Bengt Forsberg	Windle-Yamaha	30	+1:13.74	7	8
5	2	(Germany) Werner Schwärzel	(Germany) Andreas Huber	Aro	30	+1:22.31	8	6
6	7	(United Kingdom) Dick Greasley	(United Kingdom) Mick Skeels	Chell-Yamaha	29	+1 lap	9	5
7	10	(Switzerland) Bruno Holzer	(Switzerland) Charly Meierhans	LCR-Yamaha	29	+1 lap	13	4
8	18	(Germany) Heinz Luthringshauser	(Germany) Helmut Hahn	MKM	28	+2 laps		3
9	33	(Italy) Amedeo Zini	(Italy) Andreas Fornaro	König	28	+2 laps		2
10	22	(Austria) Herbert Prügl	(Austria) Hans Kussberger	Rotax	28	+2 laps	10	1
11	19	(Belgium) Marc Alexandre	(Belgium) Paul Gerard	Kova-König	28	+2 laps		
NC	6	(Germany) Helmut Schilling	(Germany) Rainer Gundel	Aro	26	+4 laps	11	
NC	17	(Switzerland) Rüdi Kurth	(United Kingdom) Dane Rowe	Yamaha	26	+4 laps	2	
NC	5	(Germany) Siegfried Schauzu	(Germany) "Wohlfart"	Yamaha	25	+5 laps	15	
NC	12	(Germany) Ted Janssen	(Germany) Erich Schmitz	Colyam	23	+7 laps		
		(Switzerland) Jean-François Monnin	(Switzerland) Edouard Weber	Seymaz-Yamaha			4	
		(Germany) Rolf Steinhausen	(Germany) Sepp Huber	Busch-König			6	
		(Germany) Max Venus	(Germany) Norman Bittermann	König			12	
		(Switzerland) Hermann Schmid	(Switzerland) Jean-Petit Matille	Schmid-Yamaha			14	
22 starters in total

Previous race: 1977 Venezuelan Grand Prix	FIM Grand Prix World Championship; 1977 season	Next race: 1977 German Grand Prix
Previous race: 1976 Austrian Grand Prix	Austrian Grand Prix	Next race: 1978 Austrian Grand Prix
