= Takazumi Katayama =

Japanese motorcycle racer

- Nationality: Japanese
- Born: 16 April 1951 (age 75); Kobe, Japan
Motorcycle racing career statistics
Grand Prix motorcycle racing
Active years	1974 - 1985
First race	1974 250cc Belgian Grand Prix
Last race	1985 500cc Belgian Grand Prix
First win	1974 250cc Swedish Grand Prix
Last win	1982 500cc Swedish Grand Prix
Team(s)	Yamaha, Honda
Championships	350cc - 1977
Starts / Wins / Podiums / Poles / F. laps / Points; 83 / 11 / 35 / 5 / 8

Takazumi Katayama (片山敬済, born April 16, 1951) is a Japanese-Korean former professional motorcycle racer and motorcycle racing team manager. He competed in the Grand Prix motorcycle road racing world championships from 1974 to 1985. In 1977, Katayama became the first Japanese competitor to win an FIM road racing World Championship. His Korean name was Bang Gyeong-Jae (방경재, 方敬済)

== Motorcycle racing career ==
Katayama was born on April 16, 1951, in Kobe, Hyogo, Japan to a Chōsen-seki Zainichi Korean family. In his first season of World Championship competition, Katayama rode a Yamaha to secure his first victory at the 1974 250cc Swedish Grand Prix at Anderstorp.

Katayama was one of the few World Championship contenders to defy convention and compete in the Isle of Man TT when most top riders chose to boycott the event due to safety issues. In his first appearance at the difficult-to-master Isle of Man TT Mountain Course in 1976, Katayama scored an impressive fourth place in the 500cc Senior TT along with a second place in the 250cc Lightweight TT and a ninth-place in the 350cc Junior TT.

Katayama was the first Asian rider to win an FIM road racing World Championship when he claimed the 1977 350cc World Championship aboard a Yamaha. Prior to the Yugoslavian Grand Prix, Katayama suffered a collarbone injury after a fall during an international race held in Belgium. With less than a week remaining before the qualifying sessions for the Yugoslavian GP, he underwent surgery to have the fractured bone secured with a steel plate and bolts. He then competed in the event, surprising the spectators by winning the 350cc race and securing second place in the 250cc class.

In 1979, he accepted an offer from Honda to develop their exotic oval-cylinder, four-stroke NR500 motorcycle. After retiring from competition, Katayama became a motorcycle Grand Prix racing team owner.

== Career statistics ==
=== Grand Prix motorcycle racing ===
==== Races by year ====
(key) (Races in bold indicate pole position) (Races in italics indicate fastest lap)

Year	Class	Machine	1	2	3	4	5	6	7	8	9	10	11	12	Pos.	Pts
1974	250cc	Yamaha	GER	NAT	IOM	NED; Ret	**BEL**; 3	SWE; 1	FIN; 5	CZE; 2	YUG; Ret	**SPA**; Ret			4th	43
1976	250cc	Yamaha	FRA; DNQ	NAT; 2	**YUG**; Ret	IOM; 2	NED; 2	BEL; 3	SWE; 1	FIN; 2	CZE; 3	GER; 7	SPA		2nd	73
1976	350cc	Yamaha	FRA; 4	AUT; Ret	NAT; 10	YUG; 3	IOM; 9	**NED**; Ret	FIN; DNS	CZE; 11	GER; 4	SPA			7th	28
1976	500cc	Yamaha	FRA	AUT; DNS	NAT	IOM; 4	NED	BEL; Ret	SWE	FIN; Ret	CZE	GER			26th	8
1977	250cc	Yamaha	VEN	GER; Ret	NAT; 8	SPA; 1	FRA; 8	YUG; 2	NED; 6	BEL; 2	SWE; 4	FIN; Ret	CZE; Ret	**GBR**; Ret	4th	58
1977	350cc	Yamaha	VEN	GER; 1	NAT; 3	SPA; 3	FRA; 1	YUG; 1	NED; Ret	SWE; 1	FIN; 1	CZE; Ret	GBR; Ret		1st	95
1977	500cc	Yamaha	VEN	AUT; DNS	GER	NAT	FRA	NED	BEL; Ret	SWE	FIN	CZE	GBR		NC	0
1978	350cc	Yamaha	VEN; 1	AUT; 3	FRA; Ret	NAT; 3	NED; Ret	SWE; 3	FIN; 2	GBR; Ret	GER; 1	CZE; 6	YUG		2nd	77
1978	500cc	Yamaha	VEN; Ret	SPA; 3	AUT; Ret	FRA; Ret	NAT; Ret	NED; 4	BEL; 6	SWE; 3	FIN; 2	GBR; 9	GER; 5		5th	53
1979	350cc	Yamaha	VEN	AUT; Ret	GER	NAT	SPA	YUG	NED	FIN	GBR	CZE	FRA		NC	0
1979	500cc	Honda	VEN	AUT	GER	NAT	SPA	YUG	NED	BEL	SWE	FIN	GBR; Ret	FRA; DNQ	NC	0
1980	500cc	Suzuki	NAT; 6	SPA; 4	FRA; 6	NED; Ret	BEL			GER; 12					10th	18
1980	500cc	Honda						FIN; DNS	GBR; 15						10th	18
1981	500cc	Honda	AUT; 13	GER; Ret	NAT; Ret	FRA; Ret	YUG	NED; Ret	BEL	RSM	GBR	FIN	SWE		NC	0
1982	500cc	Honda	ARG; 6	AUT; 9	FRA; DNS	SPA; 6	NAT; 7	NED; 8	BEL; Ret	YUG; 5	GBR; Ret	SWE; 1	RSM; Ret	GER; 4	7th	48
1983	500cc	Honda	RSA; Ret	FRA; Ret	NAT; 5	GER; 2	SPA; 3	AUT; 4	YUG; 5	NED; 2	BEL; 4	GBR; 6	SWE; 3	RSM; DNS	5th	77
1984	500cc	Honda	RSA	NAT	SPA	AUT	GER	FRA; DNS	YUG	NED; 8	BEL	GBR; 8	SWE; 4	RSM; Ret	13th	14
1985	500cc	Honda	RSA	SPA; Ret	GER; 11	NAT; DNS	AUT; 14	YUG; Ret	NED; Ret	BEL; 8	FRA	GBR	SWE	RSM	17th	3
