= Pat Hennen =

American motorcycle racer (1953–2024)

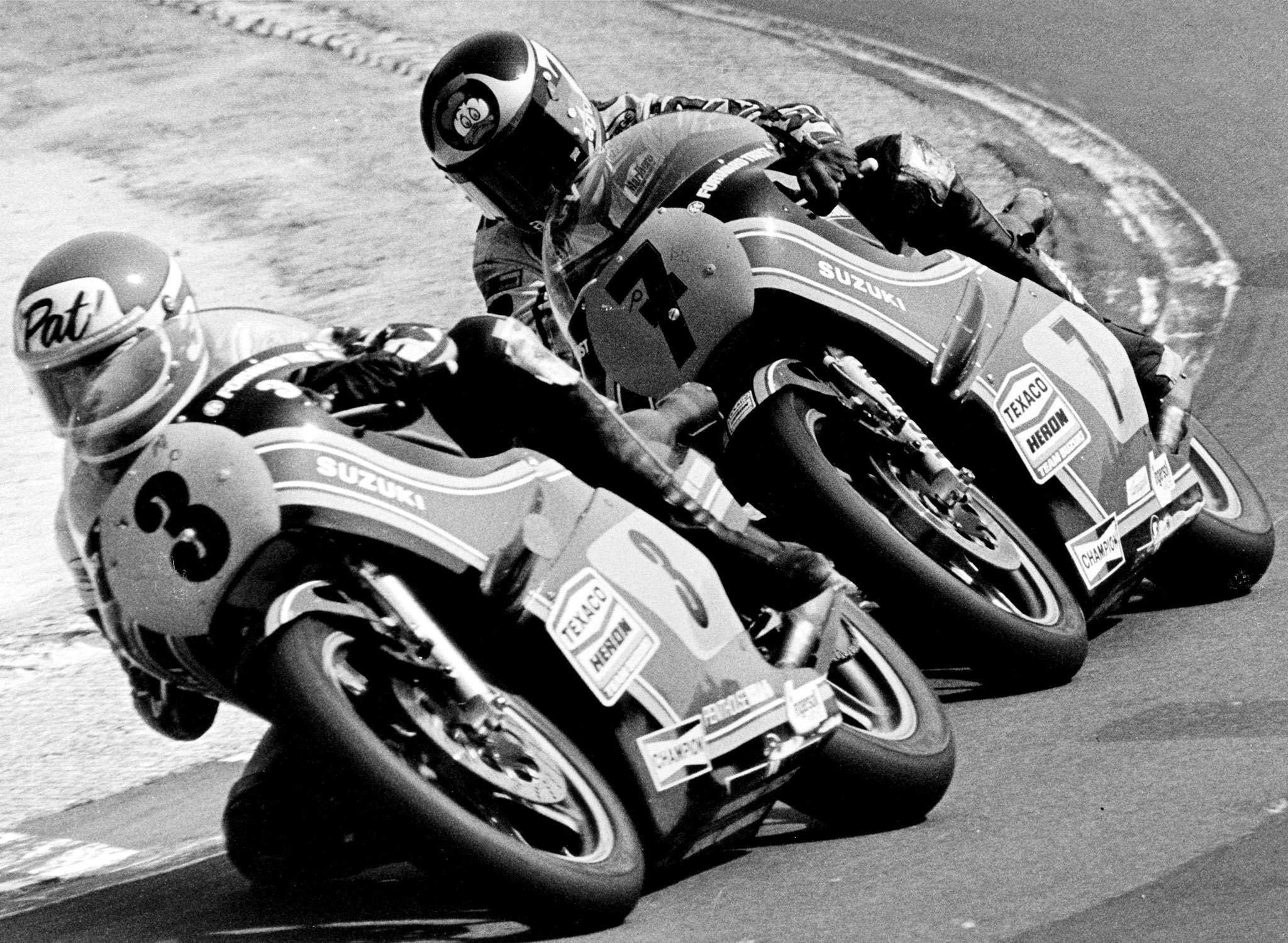
- Hennen leading Barry Sheene in 1978
- Nationality: American
- Born: April 27, 1953; Phoenix, Arizona, U.S.
- Died: April 7, 2024 (aged 70)
Motorcycle racing career statistics
Grand Prix motorcycle racing
Active years	1976 - 1978
First race	1976 500cc French Grand Prix
Last race	1978 500cc Nations Grand Prix
First win	1976 500cc Finnish Grand Prix
Last win	1978 500cc Spanish Grand Prix
Team	Suzuki
Championships	0
Starts / Wins / Podiums / Poles / F. laps / Points; 26 / 3 / 12 / 0 / 0 / 164

Patrick Bennet Hennen (April 27, 1953 – April 6, 2024) was an American professional motorcycle racer. He competed in AMA dirt track and road racing competitions from 1971 to 1975 and in the Grand Prix motorcycle racing world championships from 1976 to 1978.

Hennen is notable for being the first American to win a 500 cc World Championship Grand Prix race when he won the 1976 500cc Finnish Grand Prix. His career ended prematurely after he suffered serious injuries from a crash while competing at the 1978 Isle of Man TT race. Although he never won a world championship, Hennen was on the leading edge of a wave of American and Australian riders bred on dirt track racing who would dominate the 500cc road racing World Championships throughout the 1980s. Hennen was inducted into the AMA Motorcycle Hall of Fame in 2007.

== Motorcycle racing career ==
=== AMA racing ===
Hennen was born in Phoenix, Arizona, and grew up in the San Francisco Bay Area, where he first became interested in racing motorcycles at the age of 15. After spending four years developing his riding skills in regional races, he entered his first professional event as a novice at the end of the 1971 season.

Although his results in dirt track racing were promising, Hennen chose to focus his attention on road racing after meeting Suzuki factory road racer Ron Grant. He began to work for Grant by helping him prepare motorcycles out of Grant's home garage. In 1973 he competed in 250cc Junior Class road racing events riding a Suzuki X6 borrowed from Grant and modified by his brothers, Chip and David Hennen. Grant subsequently became Hennen's racing mentor. Grant prepared a Suzuki T500 for Hennen to race, then built him a race bike using a Suzuki GT750 engine in a Rickman Brothers chassis.

In 1974, Yamaha introduced the Yamaha TZ700 and Hennen was fortunate to be one of the few Junior Class competitors to receive one of the potent new motorcycles through his sponsor, Grant. The new Yamaha would dominate the 750cc class during the 1970s. Hennen scored the first major victory of his motorcycle racing career in 1974 at the Daytona International Speedway when he set the fastest qualifying time and won the Junior Class event aboard the TZ700. Hennen went on to win the Junior Class races at the Loudon Classic, Laguna Seca, and Talladega to become the 1974 AMA Junior road racing champion.

Hennen gained his first international exposure in 1974 when Grant took him to compete in the New Zealand Marlboro Series run over the Christmas/New Year period. Riding an underpowered Suzuki TR500, Hennen won the Marlboro Series, earning him a letter of recommendation to the Suzuki factory from Rod Coleman, the Suzuki importer for New Zealand and former Grand Prix racer who won the 1954 Isle of Man Junior TT. Coleman's opinion was highly respected by the Suzuki factory hierarchy, and his recommendation led the Suzuki factory to offer Hennen a contract to race for U.S. Suzuki's factory road race team for the 1975 season, replacing multi-time AMA National Champion Gary Nixon, who had suffered serious injuries while testing a Suzuki in Japan. Along with Ron Grant, Coleman would be instrumental in helping further Hennen's professional motorcycle racing career. Hennen won the New Zealand Marlboro Series three years in succession from 1975 to 1977. He set a new lap record for the Cemetery Circuit in Whanganui that stood for six years before it was broken.

At the 1975 Daytona 200, Hennen qualified eighth despite being relegated to riding a 1974 model Suzuki. He briefly ran with the race leaders before abandoning the race due to a mechanical malfunction. He was a member of the American team competing in the 1975 Transatlantic Trophy match races. The Transatlantic Trophy match races pitted the best British riders against the top American road racers on 750cc motorcycles in a six-race series during Easter weekend in England. Hennen scored a respectable 28 points and scored a third place in the final race at Oulton Park. That year, the United States won over Great Britain for the first time.

Hennen showed promise in the AMA national championship by claiming the pole position at the Ontario Motor Speedway, but his motorcycle experienced mechanical issues and his best result of the season was a fifth place at Laguna Seca. The 1973 oil crisis severely impacted all forms of motorsports in the United States and Suzuki made the decision to withdraw their team from the AMA national championship at the end of the 1975 season, leaving Hennen without a job until Rod Coleman offered him a Suzuki TR750 race bike which he had salvaged after learning that the factory planned to discard it.

Hennen rode the ex-factory motorcycle, built from discarded spare parts, to a dominating win at the 1976 New Zealand Marlboro Series, then scored an impressive third place at the 1976 Daytona 200 behind Johnny Cecotto and Gary Nixon, now riding for the Kawasaki factory racing team. At the time, the Daytona 200 was considered one of the most prestigious motorcycle races in the world, attracting world champions such as Giacomo Agostini and Barry Sheene. By 1976, the 750cc class had become dominated by Yamaha's powerful TZ750, making Hennen's third place finish aboard an obsolete machine all the more impressive. He also rode a Yamaha TZ 250 in the Daytona 250cc Lightweight race, finishing second to Kenny Roberts after a race-long duel. Hennen was magnanimous after the 250cc race declaring that, "Roberts was poetry on two wheels".

=== World Championships ===
In 1976, Suzuki began to sell production versions of Barry Sheene's World Championship-winning Suzuki RG 500 to the public. Inspired by Hennen's success, Coleman purchased an RG 500 for Hennen to compete in the 1976 500cc Grand Prix World Championship as a privateer. He also competed in the fledgling Formula 750 series on the same ex-factory TR750 he rode at Daytona that year. The 500cc World Championships were the highest level of professional motorcycle road racing during that era. Hennen competed on a shoestring budget, driving to races across Europe in a small van with his brother Chip serving as his team manager as well as his mechanic.

When they arrived in France for the season-opening 1976 French Grand Prix, some observers laughed at the raw, inexperienced team. Although, they received valuable spare parts and assistance from Merv Wright, the manager of Suzuki's British-based factory Grand Prix team, this displeased Suzuki's number one rider, Barry Sheene, who recognized the threat that Hennen posed to his position at the top of the team's hierarchy. Hennen also befriended fellow Suzuki privateer, Teuvo Länsivuori, who offered valuable mechanical advice such as proper gearing selections for race tracks where the Hennen brothers had no previous experience. Länsivuori's team manager also provided Hennen with assistance in securing race invitations.

After a slow start to the 1976 season, Hennen finished runner-up in the Dutch TT at Assen, behind Sheene and ahead of multi-time World Champion Giacomo Agostini. However, Sheene was at the peak of his career and won five of the first seven Grand Prix races to claim the World Championship at the Swedish Grand Prix. Having secured the championship, Sheene then chose not to compete in the final three rounds as he disliked riding the dangerous circuits remaining on the schedule.

Sheene's absence then allowed Hennen to score an upset victory over Länsivuori and Agostini at the 1976 500cc Finnish Grand Prix, becoming the first American competitor to win a 500 cc World Championship Grand Prix race. His upset victory was so unexpected that the Finnish race organizer did not have a copy of the American national anthem to play during the awards ceremony. Hennen said in a 1977 interview that local rider Länsivuori helped him win the race by allowing Hennen follow him during practice to learn the 3.747 miles (6.030 km) long street circuit, and see where the track's uneven surface held hidden bumps even on its straight sections. Hennen's experience from racing on street circuits in New Zealand, such as the Cemetery Circuit, helped to prepare him for Europe's challenging street circuits. The Imatra Circuit, home of the Finnish Grand Prix, was notoriously dangerous featuring curbs, manhole covers, street signs and light poles along with a railroad crossing.

The final race of the season was the German Grand Prix held at the daunting, 14.2 miles (22.9 km) long Nürburgring racetrack, considered too dangerous for the Formula One championship. Despite racing on the circuit for the first time, Hennen finished the race in an impressive third place behind Agostini and future World Champion Marco Lucchinelli. Competing as a privateer rider against factory-sponsored teams, he scored two podium results along with his maiden Grand Prix victory to finish third overall in the 500cc World Championship standings, only 2 points behind runner-up Länsivuori and fellow Suzuki factory-sponsored rider Sheene.

Having established himself as one of the top three 500cc riders in 1976 earned Hennen a position on the Heron-Suzuki factory racing team for the 1977 season, with newly crowned 500cc World Champion Sheene as his teammate. Sheene continued to treat Hennen with animosity by commandeering the best equipment for himself. Hennen was forced to skip the 1977 Daytona 200 because Suzuki had not finished developing their 750cc race bike but, he was the top points scorer at the 1977 Transatlantic Match races.

At the season-opening 500cc Venezuelan Grand Prix, Sheene claimed the victory followed by Steve Baker (Yamaha) in second with Hennen taking third place. The second round at the Salzburgring circuit in Austria was marred by crash during the 350cc race that claimed the life of Swiss rider, Hans Stadelmann and seriously injured Johnny Cecotto, Patrick Fernandez, Dieter Braun and Franco Uncini. While Hennen, Sheene and most other 500 class riders refused to race due to the lack of medical personnel, the race organizers pressed on with the race as Jack Findlay won from a reduced field of competitors.

Sheene continued to set the pace with another victory at the German Grand Prix with Hennen in second as Baker finished in third place. At the fourth round at the Imola Circuit in Italy, Sheene won again while Hennen crashed out of the race when a newly designed fairing he was using touched the ground. At the mid-point of the season, Hennen traveled to the Isle of Man to compete in his first Senior TT race however, he experienced mechanical problems and did not finish the race.

Hennen and Baker were in a tight battle for second place in the championship when Hennen's motorcycle had a clutch failure at the Finnish Grand Prix that ruined his chances for the runner-up spot. Despite Sheene's continuing animosity, Hennen scored four podium positions including beating Sheene at his home Grand Prix at the Silverstone Circuit. Sheene had taken the lead of the Silverstone race when a mechanical issue forced his retirement. Steve Parrish then led the race ahead of John Williams with Hennen in third place as they began the final lap, when Parrish crashed out of the lead, and then Williams did the same three corners later, handing Hennen his second career Grand Prix victory.

The 1977 British Grand Prix marked the beginning of a new era, as it was the first time the event was held on the British mainland after the Isle of Man TT had represented the United Kingdom on the FIM Grand Prix calendar for the previous 28 years since the championship's inception in 1949. Once the most prestigious race of the year, the Isle of Man TT had been increasingly boycotted by the top riders, and finally succumbed to pressure for increased safety in racing events.

Hennen ended the season once again ranked third in the world championship behind Sheene and Yamaha rider, Steve Baker. He finished the year by performing a hat-trick with a victory at the prestigious Mallory Park Race of the Year as well as the Motor Cycle News-Brut 33 Superbike Championship round and the 500cc final.

Hennen began the 1978 season by dominating the 1978 Transatlantic Match races, winning three races as well as two second places and one third place, becoming the top scorer in the prestigious event. His battle with his Suzuki teammate continued, when Sheene accused him of dangerous riding, when Hennen passed him just before the finish line . Seeking a psychological advantage over his rival, Sheene publicly disparaged his American teammate, telling journalists, “If you pay peanuts, you get a monkey”. However, his tactics had no effect on the quiet, easy-going Hennen.

After Yamaha withdrew from the AMA Grand National Championship, Roberts joined Hennen in the 500cc world championship, where the American duo posed the strongest threat to Sheene's two-year reign at the beginning of the 1978 season. Hennen scored a second place behind Sheene at the season-opening Venezuelan Grand Prix before claiming the world championship points lead by winning the third Grand Prix victory of his career at the Spanish Grand Prix held at Jarama. Roberts then won the next three rounds with Hennen posting two second places, as the two Americans were separated by a five point margin atop the world championship standings when Hennen suffered career-ending injuries while competing in the 1978 Isle of Man TT race.

By 1978, most of the top Grand Prix riders, including Sheene refused to compete in the Isle of Man TT races due to the dangers of racing on a street circuit- especially one as legendarily dangerous as the 37.75 mile (60 km) Isle of Man TT Mountain Course. However, the British-based Suzuki factory team wanted one of its top riders entered into the event so, Hennen was called upon to race. Tom Herron was leading the race with Hennen aggressively pursuing him in second place. Only minutes after recording the first ever sub-20 minute lap on a Suzuki RG 500, Hennen crashed at Bishopscourt on the last lap of the race. There was a suggestion at the time that he had struck a bird although this is now considered an unfounded rumor. Hennen's injuries proved to be too severe and he was never able to compete again. Roberts would go on to win the 1978 championship to become America's first 500cc Grand Prix World Champion.

== Later life and death ==
Hennen suffered brain damage in the crash and had a slow recovery period. He ever afterwards had impairments to his speech, memory, and mobility but was able to live a relatively normal life in the San Francisco Bay area. He became a devout Christian and worked for a manufacturer of racing go-karts then, worked for United Airlines performing maintenance work on jet engines. He also worked as an application engineer for an American distributor of motorcycle parts.

Although he never won a world championship, Hennen was on the leading edge of a wave of American and Australian riders bred on dirt track racing who would dominate the 500cc road racing World Championships throughout the 1980s, including World Champions Freddie Spencer, Eddie Lawson, Wayne Rainey, Kevin Schwantz and Mick Doohan.

Hennen died on April 6, 2024, at the age of 70.

== Grand Prix career statistics ==
**Position**	1	2	3	4	5	6	7	8	9	10
**Points**	15	12	10	8	6	5	4	3	2	1

(key) (Races in bold indicate pole position; races in italics indicate fastest lap)

Year	Class	Team	Machine	1	2	3	4	5	6	7	8	9	10	11	Points	Rank	Wins
1976	500cc	Coleman-Suzuki	RG500	FRA; Ret	AUT; Ret	NAT; 5	IOM -	NED; 2	BEL; 8	SWE; Ret	FIN; 1	CZE; Ret	GER; 3		46	3rd	1
1977	500cc	Heron-Suzuki	RG500	VEN; 3	AUT -	GER; 2	NAT; Ret	FRA; 10	NED; 3	BEL; 3	SWE; 10	FIN; Ret	CZE; 4	GBR; 1	67	3rd	1
1978	500cc	Heron-Suzuki	RG500	VEN; 2	ESP; 1	AUT; Ret	FRA; 2	NAT; 2	NED -	BEL -	SWE -	FIN -	GBR -	GER -	51	6th	1
