= Cees van Dongen =

Dutch motorcycle racer

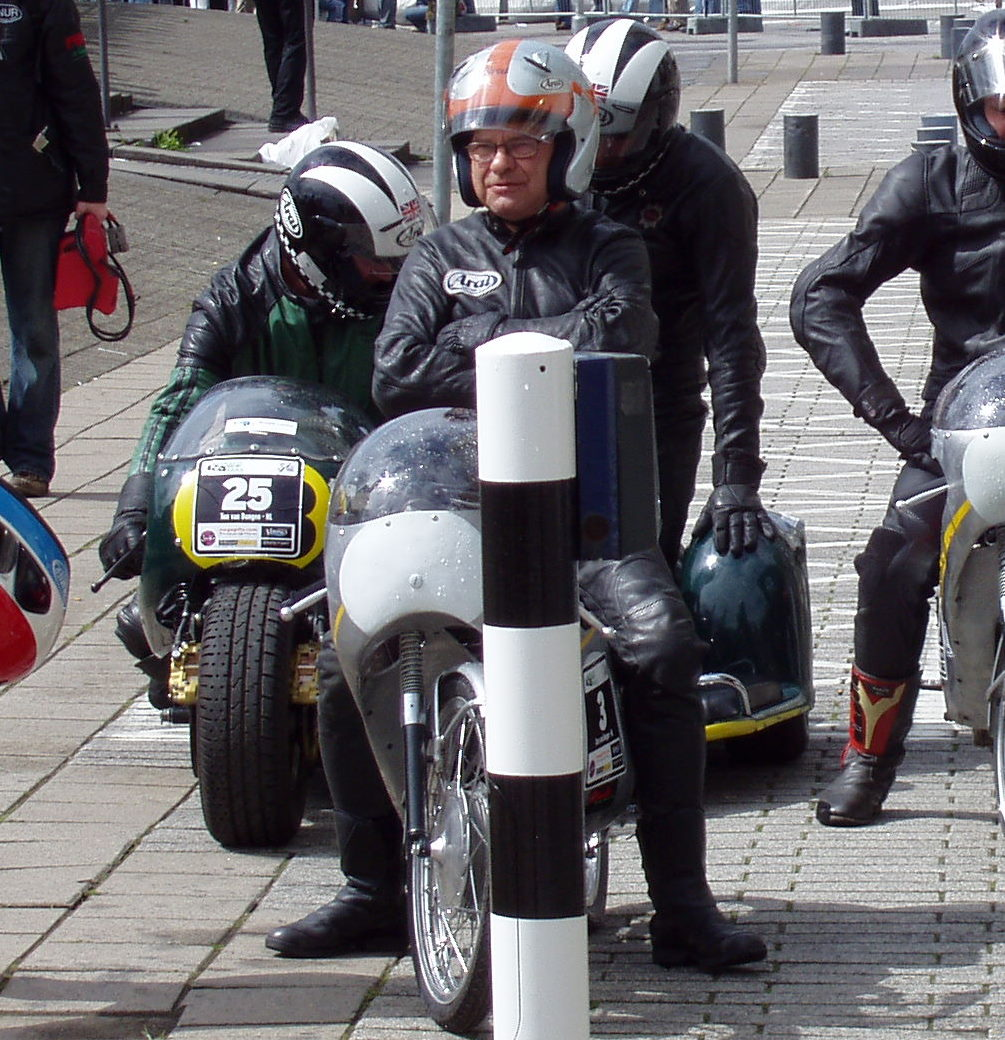
- van Dongen at the Bavaria City Races in 2005.
- Nationality: Dutch
Motorcycle racing career statistics
Grand Prix motorcycle racing
Active years	1964, 1966 - 1979, 1981
First race	1964 50cc Dutch TT
Last race	1981 50cc Dutch TT
First win	1969 125cc Spanish Grand Prix
Last win	1969 125cc Spanish Grand Prix
Team	Kreidler
Championships	0
Starts / Wins / Podiums / Poles / F. laps / Points; 48 / 1 / 5 / N/A / N/A / 219

Cees van Dongen (1 February 1932 – 23 December 2011) was a Grand Prix motorcycle road racer from the Netherlands. He competed in the Grand Prix motorcycle racing world championships from 1969 to 1981.

== Motorcycle racing career ==
Van Dongen was born in Rotterdam. He was the first non-Japanese competitor to ride a Yamaha in a World Championship Grand Prix race, when he rode a Yamaha RA41 to a 13th place finish at the 1961 125cc Dutch TT. His best season was in 1969 when he won the 125cc Spanish Grand Prix and finished the season in third place behind Dave Simmonds and Dieter Braun. Van Dongen was a 14-time Dutch National Champion in classes ranging from 50 cc to 500 cc.

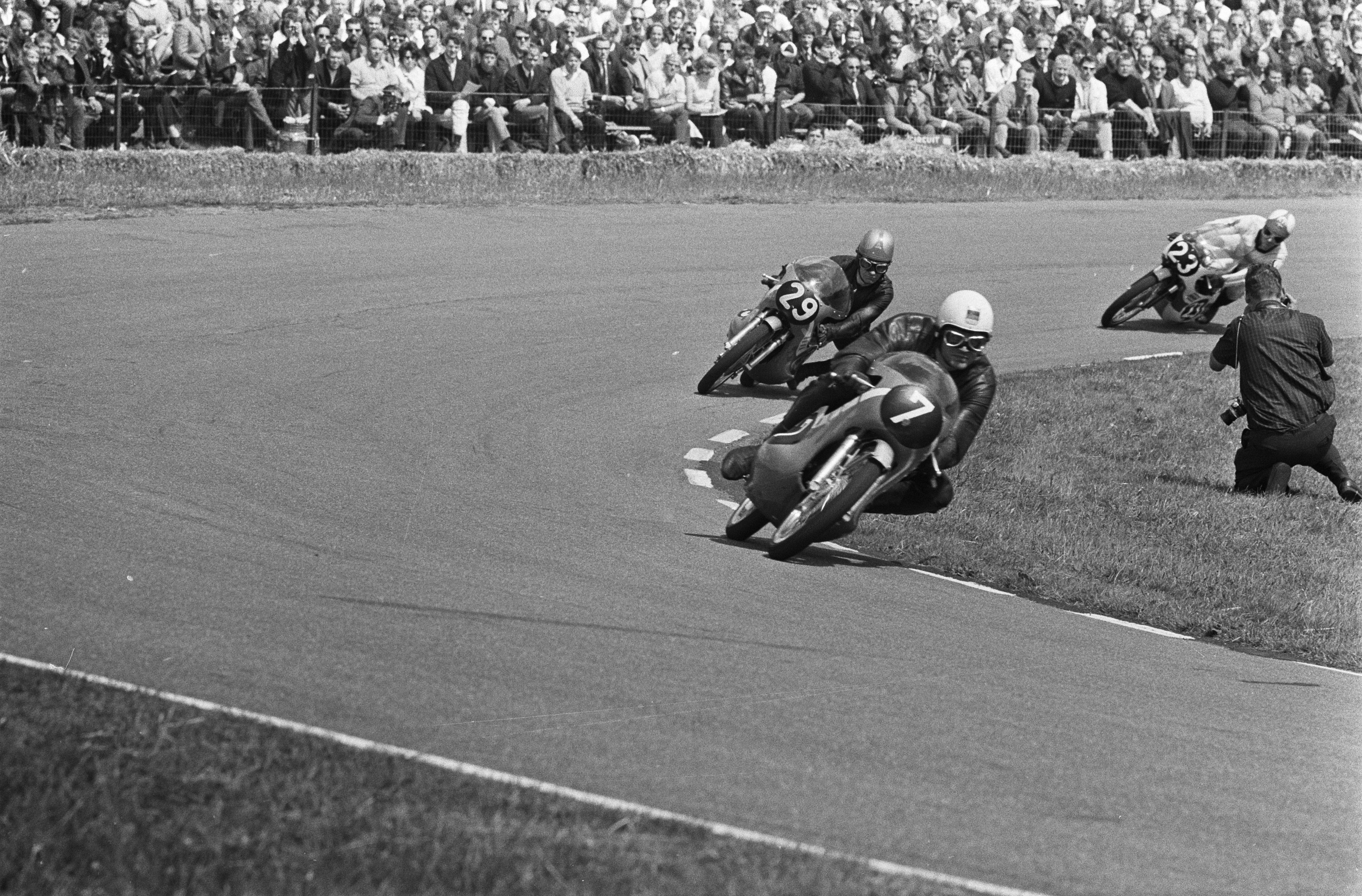
Cees van Dongen (29) and Kent Andersson (23) pursue Dieter Braun (7), in the 1969 125cc Dutch TT

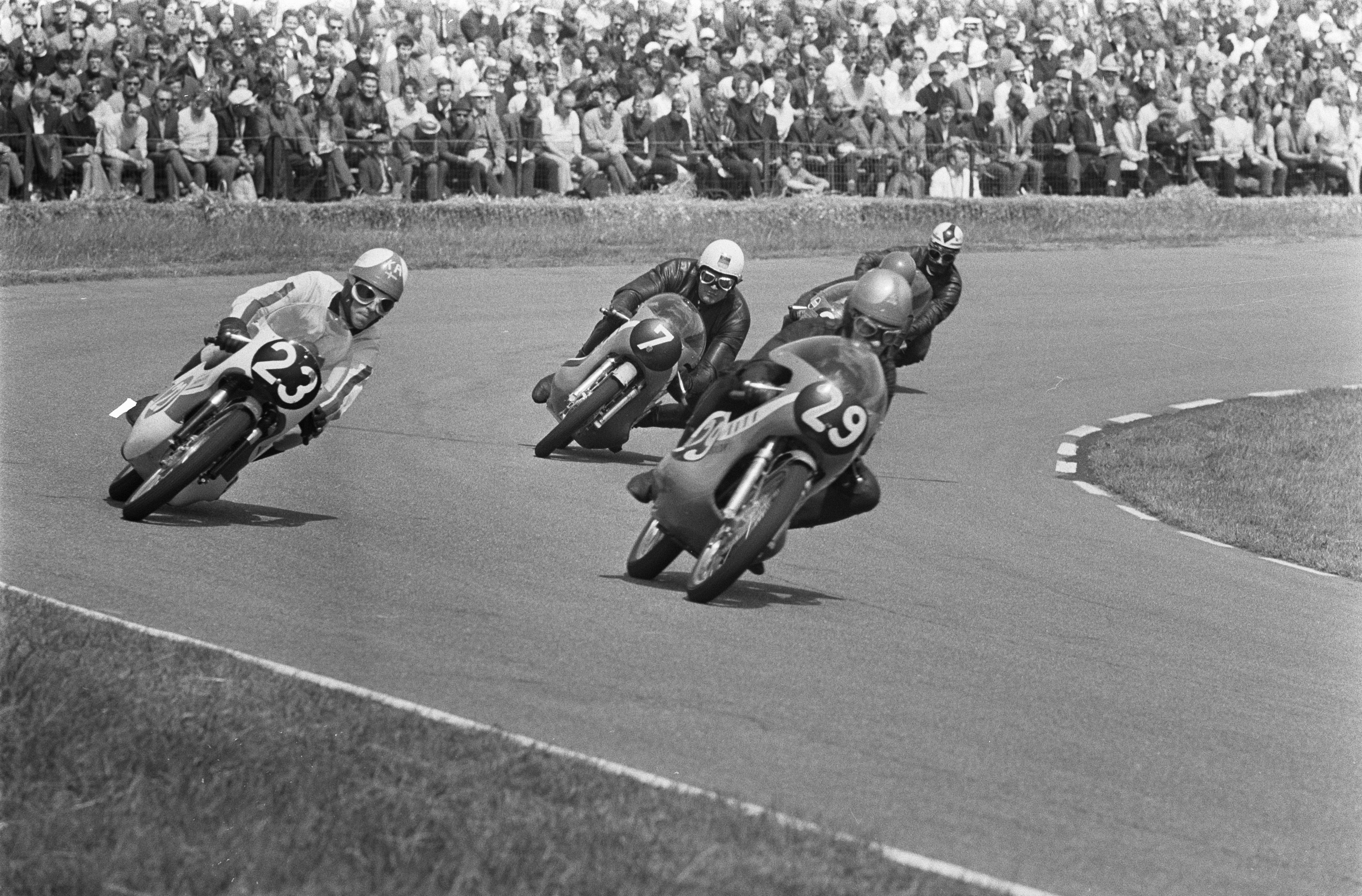
Kent Andersson (23) and Dieter Braun (7) pursue van Dongen (29) in the 1969 125cc Dutch TT. Eventual winner, Dave Simmonds, follows behind an obscured rider.

== Career statistics ==
=== Grand Prix motorcycle racing ===
==== Races by year ====
(key) (Races in bold indicate pole position) (Races in italics indicate fastest lap)

Year	Class	Bike	1	2	3	4	5	6	7	8	9	10	11	12	13	Pos.	Pts
1961	125cc	Yamaha	SPA	GER	FRA	IOM	NED; 13	BEL	DDR	ULS	NAT	SWE	ARG			NC	0
1962	50cc	Honda	SPA	FRA	IOM	NED; 8	BEL	GER	DDR	NAT	FIN	ARG				NC	0
1963	50cc	Kreidler	SPA	GER	FRA	IOM	NED; 8	BEL	FIN	ARG	JPN					NC	0
1963	125cc	Honda	SPA	GER	FRA	IOM	NED; 7	BEL	ULS	DDR	FIN	NAT	ARG	JPN		NC	0
1963	250cc	Honda	SPA	GER	IOM	NED	BEL; 7	ULS	DDR	NAT	ARG	JPN				NC	0
1964	50cc	Kreidler	USA	SPA	FRA	IOM	NED; 5	BEL	GER	FIN	JPN					10th	2
1964	125cc	MZ	USA	SPA	FRA	IOM	NED; 8	GER	DDR	ULS	FIN	NAT	JPN			NC	0
1965	50cc	Kreidler	USA	GER	SPA	FRA	IOM	NED; 6	BEL; 6	JPN						14th	2
1965	250cc	Bultaco	USA	GER	SPA	FRA	IOM	NED; 14	BEL	DDR	CZE	ULS	FIN	NAT	JPN	NC	0
1966	50cc	Kreidler	SPA	GER; 6	NED	IOM	NAT	JPN								13th	1
1966	125cc	Honda	SPA	GER	NED; 8	DDR	CZE	FIN	ULS	IOM	NAT	JPN				NC	0
1967	50cc	Honda	SPA	GER	FRA	IOM	NED	BEL; 7	JPN							NC	0
1967	125cc	Honda	SPA	GER	FRA	IOM	NED; 5	BEL	DDR	CZE	FIN	ULS	NAT	CAN	JPN	21st	2
1968	50cc	Kreidler	GER; 5	SPA	IOM	NED	BEL									13th	2
1968	250cc	Yamaha	GER	SPA	IOM	NED; 11	BEL; 16	DDR	CZE	FIN	ULS	NAT				NC	0
1969	50cc	Kreidler	SPA	GER	FRA	NED	BEL; 4	DDR	CZE; 5	ULS	NAT	YUG				11th	14
1969	125cc	Suzuki	SPA; 1	GER; Ret	FRA	IOM	NED; Ret	BEL; 3	DDR; 5	CZE; 3	FIN; 3	NAT	YUG			3rd	51
1970	50cc	Kreidler	GER	FRA; 23	YUG; 7	NED	BEL; 8	DDR	CZE	ULS	NAT	SPA				16th	7
1970	125cc	Yamaha	GER	FRA; Ret	YUG	IOM	NED; DNS	BEL	DDR	CZE	FIN	NAT; 3	SPA; 11			17th	10
1970	250cc	MZ	GER	FRA; 8	YUG	IOM										22nd	10
1970	250cc	Yamaha					NED; 6	BEL	DDR	CZE	FIN	ULS	NAT	SPA; 9		22nd	10
1971	50cc	Jamathi	AUT	GER	NED	BEL	DDR; 5	CZE	SWE	NAT	SPA					22nd	6
1971	125cc	Yamaha	AUT; 6	GER	IOM	NED; Ret	BEL; 4	DDR; 5	CZE	SWE	FIN	NAT	SPA			13th	19
1972	50cc	Kreidler	GER	NAT	YUG	NED; 11	BEL	DDR	SWE							29th	2
1972	50cc	Roton								SPA; 9						29th	2
1972	125cc	Yamaha	GER; 8	FRA	AUT	NAT	IOM	YUG	NED; 5	BEL	DDR	CZE	SWE	FIN	SPA; 7	14th	13
1973	50cc	Kreidler	GER	NAT	YUG	NED; Ret	BEL; 10	SWE	SPA							28th	1
1973	125cc	Yamaha	FRA	AUT	GER	NAT	IOM	YUG	NED; Ret	BEL; 14	CZE	SWE	FIN	SPA		NC	0
1974	50cc	Kreidler	FRA	GER	NAT	NED	BEL; 6	SWE	FIN	CZE	YUG	SPA; Ret				21st	5
1974	125cc	Yamaha	FRA	GER	AUT	NAT	NED; Ret	BEL; Ret	SWE	CZE	YUG	SPA				NC	0
1975	50cc	Kreidler	SPA; 8	GER; 11	NAT	NED; Ret	BEL; 6	SWE; Ret	FIN; 11	YUG; Ret						16th	8
1975	125cc	Yamaha	FRA; DNQ	SPA; 13	AUT; Ret	GER; 19	NAT	NED; Ret			CZE; 11	YUG; 7				13th	9
1975	125cc	Bridgestone							BEL; 6	SWE; Ret						13th	9
1976	50cc	Kreidler	FRA; 18	NAT; 11	YUG; 8	NED; Ret	BEL; 8	SWE; Ret	FIN; 8	GER	SPA; Ret					15th	9
1976	125cc	Bridgestone	AUT; Ret	NAT; Ret												13th	11
1976	125cc	Morbidelli			YUG; 6	NED; 7	BEL; 10	SWE	FIN; DNS	GER	SPA; 10					13th	11
1977	50cc	Kreidler	GER; Ret	NAT; Ret	SPA	YUG; 4	NED; Ret	BEL; 12	SWE; Ret							13th	8
1977	125cc	Morbidelli	VEN	AUT; 17	GER; 25	NAT; DNQ	SPA	FRA	YUG; 8	NED; 13	BEL; 9	SWE; Ret	FIN; 13	GBR; 21		24th	5
1978	50cc	Kreidler	SPA; 5	NAT	NED; 9	BEL; 9	GER; 20	CZE; 12	YUG							15th	10
1978	125cc	Morbidelli	VEN	SPA; 15	AUT; Ret	FRA	NAT	NED; 7	BEL; 9	SWE	FIN	GBR; 12	GER; Ret	YUG		21st	6
1979	50cc	Kreidler	GER; Ret	NAT	SPA; Ret	YUG	NED; Ret	BEL; 10	FRA							28th	1
1979	125cc	Morbidelli	VEN	AUT	GER; 18	NAT	SPA; DNQ	YUG	NED; Ret	BEL	SWE	FIN	GBR	CZE	FRA	NC	0
1980	50cc	Kreidler	NAT	SPA; 15	YUG	NED; 15	BEL	GER								NC	0
1980	125cc	MBA	NAT	SPA; 19	FRA											NC	0
1980	125cc	Morbidelli				YUG; DNQ	NED; 18	BEL	FIN	GBR	CZE	GER				NC	0
