= Finnish motorcycle Grand Prix =

Finnish Grand Prix
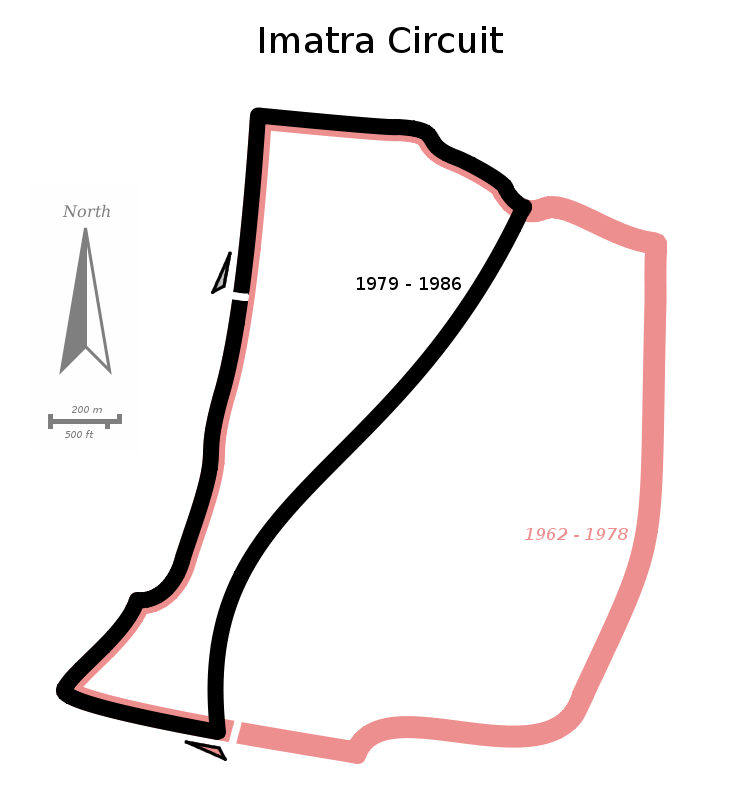

Grand Prix motorcycle racing
- Venue: Imatra Circuit (1964–1982); Tampere Circuit (1962–1963)
- First race: 1962
- Last race: 1982
- Most wins (rider): Giacomo Agostini (16)
- Most wins (manufacturer): MV Agusta (18)

The Finnish motorcycle Grand Prix was part of the FIM Grand Prix motorcycle racing championship from 1962 to 1982. It was held at the Tampere Circuit in 1962 and 1963 before moving to the Imatra Circuit. Giacomo Agostini won the most Finnish Grands Prix with ten 500cc victories and six 350cc victories. In July 2016, it was announced the Grand Prix would return on the new Kymi Ring circuit.

After a 5-year contract was agreed, to start with a scheduled event in 2021, this was cancelled on 14 May 2021 due to COVID-19. The next anticipated event for 2022 was cancelled on 25 May 2022, due to incomplete homologation works at the track and the risks associated with the geopolitical situation in the region concerning the Russian invasion of Ukraine. The MotoGP 2023 provisional race calendar was announced in late September 2022, without the Finnish Grand Prix.

== Official names and sponsors ==
- 1964, 1968, 1972–1974: Suomen Grand Prix (no official sponsor)
- 1969: Suomen/Finnish Grand Prix (no official sponsor)
- 1975–1976, 1978–1979: Imatranajo (no official sponsor)
- 1977: Suomen Grand Prix/Finnish Grand Prix (no official sponsor)
- 1980–1982: Finnish GP (no official sponsor)

== Formerly used circuits ==
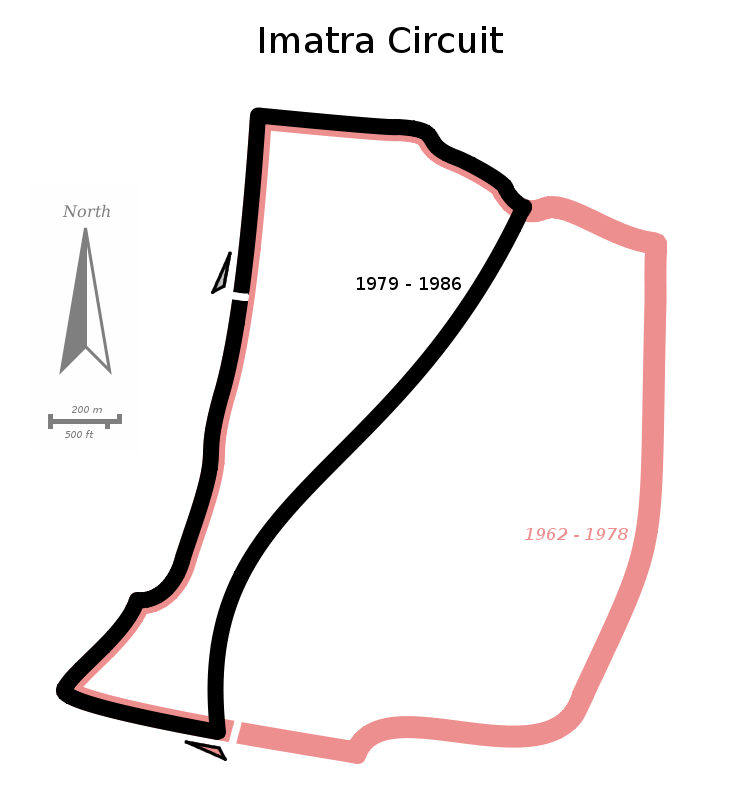
Imatra, used in 1964–1982 with two different layouts

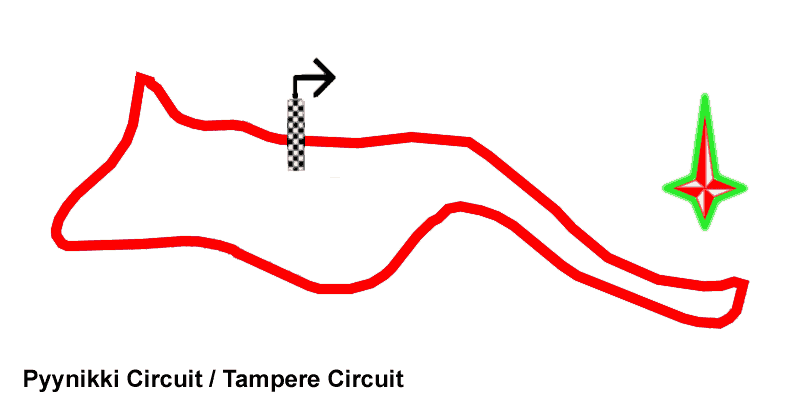
Pyynikki (Tampere), used in 1962–1963

== Winners ==
=== Multiple winners (riders) ===
| # Wins | Rider | Wins | |
| # Wins | Rider | Category | Years won |
|---|---|---|---|
| 16 | (Italy) Giacomo Agostini | 500cc | 1965, 1966, 1967, 1968, 1969, 1970, 1971, 1972, 1973, 1975 |
| 16 | (Italy) Giacomo Agostini | 350cc | 1965, 1969, 1970, 1971, 1972, 1973 |
| 5 | (United Kingdom) Mike Hailwood | 500cc | 1963 |
| 5 | (United Kingdom) Mike Hailwood | 350cc | 1963, 1966 |
| 5 | (United Kingdom) Mike Hailwood | 250cc | 1966, 1967 |
| 4 | (United Kingdom) Phil Read | 500cc | 1974 |
| 4 | (United Kingdom) Phil Read | 250cc | 1968 |
| 4 | (United Kingdom) Phil Read | 125cc | 1966, 1968 |
| 4 | (Italy) Walter Villa | 350cc | 1976 |
| 4 | (Italy) Walter Villa | 250cc | 1974, 1976, 1977 |
| 4 | (South Africa) Kork Ballington | 350cc | 1978 |
| 4 | (South Africa) Kork Ballington | 250cc | 1978, 1979, 1980 |
| 4 | (Spain) Ángel Nieto | 125cc | 1978, 1980, 1981 |
| 4 | (Spain) Ángel Nieto | 50cc | 1975 |
| 3 | (New Zealand) Hugh Anderson | 125cc | 1963, 1965 |
| 3 | (New Zealand) Hugh Anderson | 50cc | 1964 |
| 2 | (Switzerland) Luigi Taveri | 125cc | 1964 |
| 2 | (Switzerland) Luigi Taveri | 50cc | 1962 |
| 2 | (United Kingdom) Dave Simmonds | 125cc | 1969, 1970 |
| 2 | (United Kingdom) Rodney Gould | 250cc | 1970, 1971 |
| 2 | (Sweden) Kent Andersson | 250cc | 1969 |
| 2 | (Sweden) Kent Andersson | 125cc | 1972 |
| 2 | (Belgium) Julien van Zeebroeck | 50cc | 1974, 1976 |
| 2 | (Italy) Pier Paolo Bianchi | 125cc | 1976, 1977 |
| 2 | (Venezuela) Johnny Cecotto | 500cc | 1977 |
| 2 | (Venezuela) Johnny Cecotto | 350cc | 1975 |
| 2 | (Netherlands) Wil Hartog | 500cc | 1978, 1980 |
| 2 | (West Germany) Anton Mang | 350cc | 1982 |
| 2 | (West Germany) Anton Mang | 250cc | 1981 |

=== Multiple winners (manufacturers) ===
| # Wins | Manufacturer | Wins | |
| # Wins | Manufacturer | Category | Years won |
|---|---|---|---|
| 18 | (Italy) MV Agusta | 500cc | 1963, 1965, 1966, 1967, 1968, 1969, 1970, 1971, 1972, 1973, 1974 |
| 18 | (Italy) MV Agusta | 350cc | 1963, 1965, 1969, 1970, 1971, 1972, 1973 |
| 15 | (Japan) Yamaha | 500cc | 1975, 1977 |
| 15 | (Japan) Yamaha | 350cc | 1974, 1975 |
| 15 | (Japan) Yamaha | 250cc | 1965, 1968, 1969, 1970, 1971, 1972, 1973, 1982 |
| 15 | (Japan) Yamaha | 125cc | 1966, 1968, 1972 |
| 10 | (Japan) Suzuki | 500cc | 1976, 1978, 1979, 1980, 1981 |
| 10 | (Japan) Suzuki | 125cc | 1963, 1965, 1967, 1971 |
| 10 | (Japan) Suzuki | 50cc | 1964 |
| 10 | (Japan) Kawasaki | 350cc | 1977, 1978, 1979, 1982 |
| 10 | (Japan) Kawasaki | 250cc | 1978, 1979, 1980, 1981 |
| 10 | (Japan) Kawasaki | 125cc | 1969, 1970 |
| 8 | (Japan) Honda | 350cc | 1962, 1964, 1966 |
| 8 | (Japan) Honda | 250cc | 1966, 1967 |
| 8 | (Japan) Honda | 125cc | 1962, 1964 |
| 8 | (Japan) Honda | 50cc | 1962 |
| 5 | (United States) Harley Davidson | 350cc | 1976 |
| 5 | (United States) Harley Davidson | 250cc | 1974, 1975, 1976, 1977 |
| 4 | (West Germany) Kreidler | 50cc | 1963, 1974, 1975, 1976 |
| 3 | (Italy) Minarelli | 125cc | 1978, 1980, 1981 |
| 3 | (Italy) Morbidelli | 125cc | 1976, 1977, 1982 |

=== By year ===
| Year | Track | MotoE | | | | Moto3 | | Moto2 | | MotoGP | | Report |
| Year | Track | Race 1 | | Race 2 | | Moto3 | | Moto2 | | MotoGP | | Report |
| Year | Track | Rider | Manufacturer | Rider | Manufacturer | Rider | Manufacturer | Rider | Manufacturer | Rider | Manufacturer | Report |
|---|---|---|---|---|---|---|---|---|---|---|---|---|
| 2022 | Kymi Ring | Cancelled due to incomplete homologation works and the risks associated with the geopolitical situation in the region surrounding the Russian invasion of Ukraine | | | | | | | | | | |

| Year | Track | Moto3 | | Moto2 | | MotoGP | | Report |
| Year | Track | Rider | Manufacturer | Rider | Manufacturer | Rider | Manufacturer | Report |
|---|---|---|---|---|---|---|---|---|
| 2021 | Kymi Ring | Cancelled due to the COVID-19 pandemic | | | | | | |
| 2020 | Kymi Ring | Cancelled due to the COVID-19 pandemic | | | | | | |

| Year | Track | 50cc | | 125cc | | 250cc | | 350cc | | 500cc | | Report |
| Year | Track | Rider | Manufacturer | Rider | Manufacturer | Rider | Manufacturer | Rider | Manufacturer | Rider | Manufacturer | Report |
|---|---|---|---|---|---|---|---|---|---|---|---|---|
| 1982 | Imatra | | | (Venezuela) Iván Palazzese | MBA | (France) Christian Sarron | Yamaha | (West Germany) Anton Mang | Kawasaki | | | Report |
| 1981 | Imatra | | | (Spain) Ángel Nieto | Minarelli | (West Germany) Anton Mang | Kawasaki | | | (Italy) Marco Lucchinelli | Suzuki | Report |
| 1980 | Imatra | | | (Spain) Ángel Nieto | Minarelli | (South Africa) Kork Ballington | Kawasaki | | | (Netherlands) Wil Hartog | Suzuki | Report |
| 1979 | Imatra | | | (Spain) Ricardo Tormo | Bultaco | (South Africa) Kork Ballington | Kawasaki | (Australia) Gregg Hansford | Kawasaki | (Netherlands) Boet van Dulmen | Suzuki | Report |
| 1978 | Imatra | | | (Spain) Ángel Nieto | Minarelli | (South Africa) Kork Ballington | Kawasaki | (South Africa) Kork Ballington | Kawasaki | (Netherlands) Wil Hartog | Suzuki | Report |
| 1977 | Imatra | | | (Italy) Pier Paolo Bianchi | Morbidelli | (Italy) Walter Villa | Harley Davidson | (Japan) Takazumi Katayama | Kawasaki | (Venezuela) Johnny Cecotto | Yamaha | Report |
| 1976 | Imatra | (Belgium) Julien van Zeebroeck | Kreidler | (Italy) Pier Paolo Bianchi | Morbidelli | (Italy) Walter Villa | Harley Davidson | (Italy) Walter Villa | Harley Davidson | (United States) Pat Hennen | Suzuki | Report |
| 1975 | Imatra | (Spain) Ángel Nieto | Kreidler | | | (France) Michel Rougerie | Harley Davidson | (Venezuela) Johnny Cecotto | Yamaha | (Italy) Giacomo Agostini | Yamaha | Report |
| 1974 | Imatra | (Belgium) Julien van Zeebroeck | Kreidler | | | (Italy) Walter Villa | Harley Davidson | (Australia) John Dodds | Yamaha | (United Kingdom) Phil Read | MV Agusta | Report |
| 1973 | Imatra | | | (Italy) Otello Buscherini | Malanca | (Finland) Teuvo Länsivuori | Yamaha | (Italy) Giacomo Agostini | MV Agusta | (Italy) Giacomo Agostini | MV Agusta | Report |
| 1972 | Imatra | | | (Sweden) Kent Andersson | Yamaha | (Finland) Jarno Saarinen | Yamaha | (Italy) Giacomo Agostini | MV Agusta | (Italy) Giacomo Agostini | MV Agusta | Report |
| 1971 | Imatra | | | (United Kingdom) Barry Sheene | Suzuki | (United Kingdom) Rodney Gould | Yamaha | (Italy) Giacomo Agostini | MV Agusta | (Italy) Giacomo Agostini | MV Agusta | Report |
| 1970 | Imatra | | | (United Kingdom) Dave Simmonds | Kawasaki | (United Kingdom) Rodney Gould | Yamaha | (Italy) Giacomo Agostini | MV Agusta | (Italy) Giacomo Agostini | MV Agusta | Report |
| 1969 | Imatra | | | (United Kingdom) Dave Simmonds | Kawasaki | (Sweden) Kent Andersson | Yamaha | (Italy) Giacomo Agostini | MV Agusta | (Italy) Giacomo Agostini | MV Agusta | Report |
| 1968 | Imatra | | | (United Kingdom) Phil Read | Yamaha | (United Kingdom) Phil Read | Yamaha | | | (Italy) Giacomo Agostini | MV Agusta | Report |
| 1967 | Imatra | | | (United Kingdom) Stuart Graham | Suzuki | (United Kingdom) Mike Hailwood | Honda | | | (Italy) Giacomo Agostini | MV Agusta | Report |
| 1966 | Imatra | | | (United Kingdom) Phil Read | Yamaha | (United Kingdom) Mike Hailwood | Honda | (United Kingdom) Mike Hailwood | Honda | (Italy) Giacomo Agostini | MV Agusta | Report |
| 1965 | Imatra | | | (New Zealand) Hugh Anderson | Suzuki | (Canada) Mike Duff | Yamaha | (Italy) Giacomo Agostini | MV Agusta | (Italy) Giacomo Agostini | MV Agusta | Report |
| 1964 | Imatra | (New Zealand) Hugh Anderson | Suzuki | (Switzerland) Luigi Taveri | Honda | | | (Rhodesia) Jim Redman | Honda | (Australia) Jack Ahearn | Norton | Report |
| 1963 | Tampere | (West Germany) Hans-Georg Anscheidt | Kreidler | (New Zealand) Hugh Anderson | Suzuki | | | (United Kingdom) Mike Hailwood | MV Agusta | (United Kingdom) Mike Hailwood | MV Agusta | Report |
| 1962 | Tampere | (Switzerland) Luigi Taveri | Honda | (Federation of Rhodesia and Nyasaland) Jim Redman | Honda | | | (United Kingdom) Tommy Robb | Honda | (United Kingdom) Alan Shepherd | Matchless | Report |
