= Hans Stadelmann =

Swiss motorcycle racer (1941–1977)

Hans Stadelmann (24 October 1941 - 1 May 1977) was a Swiss professional Grand Prix motorcycle road racer.

Stadelmann had his most successful season in 1975 when he finished the season in 15th place in the 350cc world championship. He was killed in an accident during the 1977 350cc Austrian Grand Prix. The race was abandoned after the accident.
