= Jean-Louis Guignabodet =

French motorcycle racer

- Nationality: French
Motorcycle racing career statistics
Grand Prix motorcycle racing
Active years	1974 - 1987
First race	1974 125cc Spanish Grand Prix
Last race	1987 250cc Yugoslavian Grand Prix
Team	Morbidelli
Starts / Wins / Podiums / Poles / F. laps / Points; 92 / 0 / 5 / 0 / 0 / 281

Jean-Louis Guignabodet (born 28 March 1956 in Chelles) is a former Grand Prix motorcycle road racer from France. His best year was in 1977, where he finished in fourth place in the 125cc world championship riding for the Morbidelli factory.
