= Helmut Kassner =

German motorcycle racer

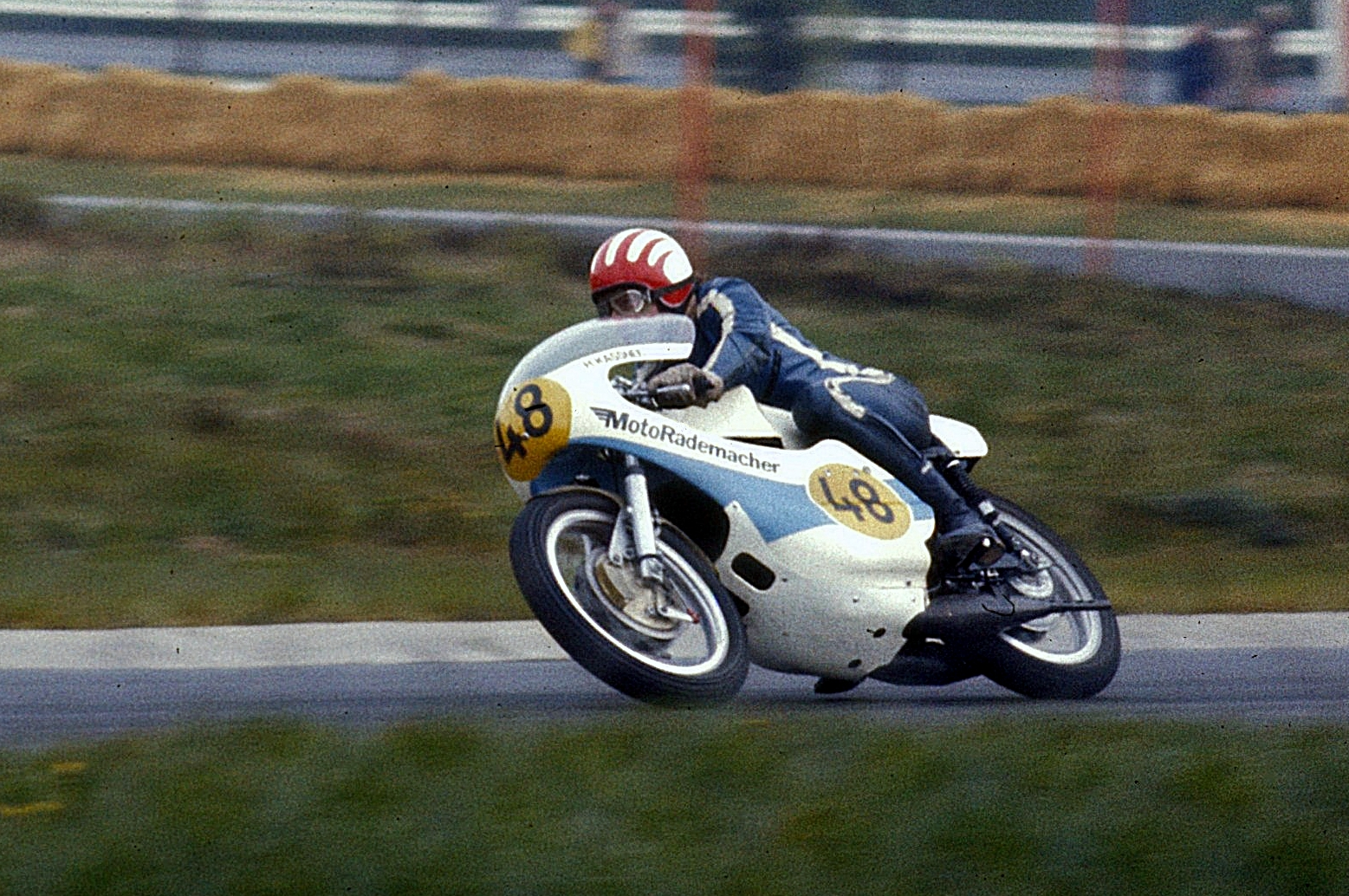
- Helmut Kassner on a Yamaha TZ350 at the largely boycotted 1974 Eifel race. He won the race ahead of Wolfgang Stephan and Franz Weidacher.
- Nationality: German
- Born: December 26, 1946 (age 79); Dachau, Bavaria, Germany
Motorcycle racing career statistics
Grand Prix motorcycle racing
Active years	1973–1977
First race	1973 250cc Isle of Man TT
Last race	1977 500cc British Grand Prix
First win	1974 250cc West German Grand Prix
Last win	1974 350cc West German Grand Prix
Team(s)	Suzuki, Yamaha
Championships	0
Starts / Wins / Podiums / Poles / F. laps / Points; 12 / 2 / 3 / 0 / 0 / 62

Helmut Kassner (born 26 December 1946, in Dachau) is a German former professional Grand Prix motorcycle road racer. His best season was in 1974 when he won the German motorcycle Grand Prix in both 350cc and 250cc categories. He is the younger brother of Horst Kassner.

On April 28, 1974, Kassner had a historic day. At the German Grand Prix, the race was boycotted by many riders due to safety concerns of the Nordschleife. In the 250cc class only eight German riders and Hungarian János Reisz started, and in the 350cc class only nine German riders participated: Kassner won both races, a feat only matched by Mike Hailwood and Giacomo Agostini earlier. In addition to this, the 500cc class saw only seven riders start the race, and with three further riders forced to retire during the race, the four that crossed the line set the record for the least finishers in Grand Prix racing's premier class history. Kassner finished 2nd behind Edmund Czihak, just missing out on a historic record held by Hailwood, who won all three class races in Brno in 1966.
