= Harald Bartol =

Austrian motorcycle racer (born 1947)

- Nationality: Austrian
Motorcycle racing career statistics
Grand Prix motorcycle racing
Active years	1970 - 1980
First race	1970 50cc West German Grand Prix
Last race	1980 125cc Czechoslovak Grand Prix
Team(s)	Kreidler, Morbidelli
Starts / Wins / Podiums / Poles / F. laps / Points; 56 / 0 / 13 / 1 / 0 / 328

Harald Bartol (born 13 May 1947) is an Austrian former professional Grand Prix motorcycle road racer, engine tuner and former Technical Director for the KTM racing team.

== Motorcycle racing career ==
Bartol's best year was in 1978 when he rode a Morbidelli to fourth place in the 125cc world championship. His best result was a second place at the 1978 125cc Austrian Grand Prix.

== Engine specialist ==
After retiring from competition, Bartol became well known as a successful engine builder for racing motorcycles. Many top Grand Prix racers sought him for his skills. In 2003, he became the Technical Director for the KTM Grand Prix road racing team, working in that capacity until the 2009 season when, the KTM factory withdrew from Grand Prix road racing.
