= Gert Bender =

German motorcycle racer

- Nationality: German
Motorcycle racing career statistics
Grand Prix motorcycle racing
Active years	1971 - 1981
First race	1971 125cc Austrian Grand Prix
Last race	1981 125cc West German Grand Prix
Starts / Wins / Podiums / Poles / F. laps / Points; 35 / 0 / 6 / N/A / N/A / 225

Gert Bender was a former Grand Prix motorcycle road racer from Germany. His best year was in 1979 when he finished the season in fifth place in the 125cc world championship.
