= 1981 FIA European Formula 3 Championship =

Open-wheel motor race series

Seasons
- ← 1980 1982 →

The 1981 FIA European Formula 3 Championship was the seventh edition of the FIA European Formula 3 Championship. The championship consisted of 14 rounds across the continent. The season was won by Italian Mauro Baldi, with Alain Ferté second and Philippe Alliot in third.

== Calendar ==
Round		Circuit	Date
1	R1	(Italy) ACI Vallelunga Circuit, Campagnano di Roma	15 March
1	R2	(Italy) ACI Vallelunga Circuit, Campagnano di Roma	15 March
1	R3	(Italy) ACI Vallelunga Circuit, Campagnano di Roma	15 March
2	R1	(West Germany) Nürburgring, Nürburg	29 March
2	R2	(West Germany) Nürburgring, Nürburg	29 March
2	R3	(West Germany) Nürburgring, Nürburg	29 March
3		(United Kingdom) Donington Park, Leicestershire	5 April
4		(Austria) Österreichring, Spielberg	19 April
5		(Belgium) Circuit Zolder, Heusden-Zolder	26 April
6		(France) Circuit de Nevers Magny-Cours, Magny-Cours	3 May
7	R1	(France) Circuit de la Châtre, La Châtre	24 May
7	R2	(France) Circuit de la Châtre, La Châtre	24 May
7	R3	(France) Circuit de la Châtre, La Châtre	24 May
8		(Netherlands) Circuit Park Zandvoort, Zandvoort	8 June
9		(United Kingdom) Silverstone Circuit, Silverstone	21 June
10	R1	(France) Circuit de Croix-en-Ternois, Croix-en-Ternois	28 June
10	R2	(France) Circuit de Croix-en-Ternois, Croix-en-Ternois	28 June
10	R3	(France) Circuit de Croix-en-Ternois, Croix-en-Ternois	28 June
11	R1	(Italy) Circuito Internazionale Santa Monica, Misano Adriatico	19 July
11	R2	(Italy) Circuito Internazionale Santa Monica, Misano Adriatico	19 July
11	R3	(Italy) Circuito Internazionale Santa Monica, Misano Adriatico	19 July
12	R1	(Sweden) Ring Knutstorp, Kågeröd	9 August
12	R2	(Sweden) Ring Knutstorp, Kågeröd	9 August
12	R3	(Sweden) Ring Knutstorp, Kågeröd	9 August
13		(Spain) Circuito del Jarama, Madrid	6 September
14	R1	(Italy) Autodromo Dino Ferrari, Imola	20 September
14	R2	(Italy) Autodromo Dino Ferrari, Imola	20 September
14	R3	(Italy) Autodromo Dino Ferrari, Imola	20 September
15	R1	(Italy) Mugello Circuit, Scarperia e San Piero	4 October
15	R2	(Italy) Mugello Circuit, Scarperia e San Piero	4 October
15	R3	(Italy) Mugello Circuit, Scarperia e San Piero	4 October

== Results ==
Round		Circuit	Pole position	Fastest lap	Winning driver	Winning team	Report
1	R1	(Italy) ACI Vallelunga Circuit	(France) Alain Ferté	(Italy) Enzo Coloni	(France) Alain Ferté	BP Racing	Report
1	R2	(Italy) ACI Vallelunga Circuit	(Italy) Mauro Baldi	(Italy) Mauro Baldi	(Italy) Mauro Baldi	Euroracing	Report
1	R3	(Italy) ACI Vallelunga Circuit		(Argentina) Oscar Larrauri	(Italy) Mauro Baldi	Euroracing	Report
2	R1	(West Germany) Nürburgring	(France) Alain Ferté	(Italy) Mauro Baldi	(Italy) Mauro Baldi	Euroracing	Report
2	R2	(West Germany) Nürburgring	(France) Philippe Alliot	(France) Philippe Alliot	(Argentina) Oscar Larrauri	Scuderia Torino Corse	Report
2	R3	(West Germany) Nürburgring		(Argentina) Oscar Larrauri	(Argentina) Oscar Larrauri	Scuderia Torino Corse	Report
3		(United Kingdom) Donington Park	(South Africa) Mike White	(South Africa) Mike White	(South Africa) Mike White	March Engineering	Report
4		(Austria) Österreichring	(Italy) Mauro Baldi	(Italy) Mauro Baldi	(Italy) Mauro Baldi	Euroracing	Report
5		(Belgium) Circuit Zolder	(Italy) Mauro Baldi	(Italy) Mauro Baldi	(Italy) Mauro Baldi	Euroracing	Report
6		(France) Circuit de Nevers Magny-Cours	(Italy) Mauro Baldi	(Italy) Mauro Baldi	(France) Philippe Alliot	Ecurie Total	Report
7	R1	(France) Circuit de la Châtre	(France) Alain Ferté	(France) Alain Ferté	(France) Philippe Alliot	Ecurie Total	Report
7	R2	(France) Circuit de la Châtre	(Italy) Mauro Baldi	(Italy) Mauro Baldi	(Argentina) Oscar Larrauri	Scuderia Torino Corse	Report
7	R3	(France) Circuit de la Châtre		(France) Alain Ferté	(France) Philippe Alliot	Ecurie Total	Report
8		(Netherlands) Circuit Park Zandvoort	(Italy) Mauro Baldi	(France) Alain Ferté	(Italy) Mauro Baldi	Euroracing	Report
9		(United Kingdom) Silverstone Circuit	(Brazil) Roberto Moreno	(Italy) Mauro Baldi	(Brazil) Roberto Moreno	Barron Racing	Report
10	R1	(France) Circuit de Croix-en-Ternois	(Italy) Mauro Baldi	(France) Philippe Alliot	(France) Philippe Alliot	Ecurie Total	Report
10	R2	(France) Circuit de Croix-en-Ternois	(France) Alain Ferté	(France) Jean-Louis Schlesser	(Italy) Emanuele Pirro	Scuderia Torino Corse	Report
10	R3	(France) Circuit de Croix-en-Ternois		(France) Alain Ferté	(Italy) Mauro Baldi	Euroracing	Report
11	R1	(Italy) Circuito Internazionale Santa Monica	(Italy) Mauro Baldi	(Italy) Mauro Baldi	(Italy) Mauro Baldi	Euroracing	Report
11	R2	(Italy) Circuito Internazionale Santa Monica	(France) Alain Ferté	(France) Alain Ferté	(France) Alain Ferté	BP Racing	Report
11	R3	(Italy) Circuito Internazionale Santa Monica		(France) Philippe Streiff	(Italy) Mauro Baldi	Euroracing	Report
12	R1	(Sweden) Ring Knutstorp	(France) Alain Ferté	(France) Alain Ferté	(France) Alain Ferté	BP Racing	Report
12	R2	(Sweden) Ring Knutstorp	(Italy) Mauro Baldi	(Italy) Mauro Baldi	(Italy) Mauro Baldi	Euroracing	Report
12	R3	(Sweden) Ring Knutstorp		(France) Alain Ferté	(Italy) Mauro Baldi	Euroracing	Report
13		(Spain) Circuito del Jarama	(Italy) Mauro Baldi	(Italy) Mauro Baldi	(France) Alain Ferté	BP Racing	Report
14	R1	(Italy) Autodromo Dino Ferrari	(France) Philippe Alliot	(Italy) Roberto Ravaglia	(France) Philippe Alliot	Ecurie Total	Report
14	R2	(Italy) Autodromo Dino Ferrari	(Italy) Emanuele Pirro	(Italy) Mauro Baldi	(Italy) Mauro Baldi	Euroracing	Report
14	R3	(Italy) Autodromo Dino Ferrari		(Italy) Mauro Baldi	(Italy) Mauro Baldi	Euroracing	Report
15	R1	(Italy) Mugello Circuit	(Italy) Mauro Baldi	(Italy) Eddy Bianchi	(Italy) Guido Cappellotto	Ecurie Total	Report
15	R2	(Italy) Mugello Circuit	(Italy) Emanuele Pirro	(Italy) Enzo Coloni	(Italy) Emanuele Pirro	Scuderia Torino Corse	Report
15	R3	(Italy) Mugello Circuit		(Belgium) Didier Theys	(Italy) Emanuele Pirro	Scuderia Torino Corse	Report

== Championship standings ==
=== Drivers' championship ===
Place	Driver	Car - Engine	Total
1	(Italy) Mauro Baldi	March 813-Alfa Romeo	94
2	(France) Alain Ferté	Martini MK34-Alfa Romeo	63
3	(France) Philippe Alliot	Martini MK34-Alfa Romeo	41
4	(France) Philippe Streiff	Martini MK34-Alfa Romeo	36
5	(Argentina) Oscar Larrauri	March 813-Toyota	32
6	(Italy) Emanuele Pirro	Martini MK34-Toyota	19
7	(France) Jean-Louis Schlesser	Martini MK34-Alfa Romeo	18
8	(Denmark) Kurt Thiim	March 813-Alfa Romeo	14
9	(South Africa) Mike White	March 813-Alfa Romeo	10
10	(Brazil) Roberto Moreno	Ralt RT3-Toyota	9
11	(Italy) Enzo Coloni	Ralt RT3-Toyota; March 813-Alfa Romeo	8
12	(Italy) Guido Cappelotto	Ralt RT3-Alfa Romeo	5
13	(United Kingdom) Jonathan Palmer	Ralt RT3-Toyota	4
13	(Belgium) Didier Theys	Martini MK34-Alfa Romeo	4
15	(Japan) Toshio Suzuki	March 813-Toyota	3
15	(West Germany) Frank Jelinski	Ralt RT3-Toyota	3
15	(Brazil) Raul Boesel	Ralt RT3-Toyota	3
18	(Austria) Franz Konrad	March 803B-Toyota	2
18	(Japan) Shuroku Sasaki	Ralt RT3-Toyota	2
20	(West Germany) Harald Brutschin	Ralt RT3-Toyota	1
20	(Italy) Fabio Mancini	March 813-Alfa Romeo	1
20	(France) Jean-Michel Neyrial	Martini MK34-Toyota	1
20	(France) Patrick Teillet	Martini MK34-Toyota	1
20	(France) Pascal Fabre	Martini MK34-Alfa Romeo	1
