= 1980 FIA European Formula 3 Championship =

Open-wheel motor race series

Seasons
- ← 1979 1981 →

The 1980 FIA European Formula 3 Championship was the sixth edition of the FIA European Formula 3 Championship. The championship consisted of 14 rounds across the continent. The season was won by Italian Michele Alboreto, with Thierry Boutsen second and Corrado Fabi in third.

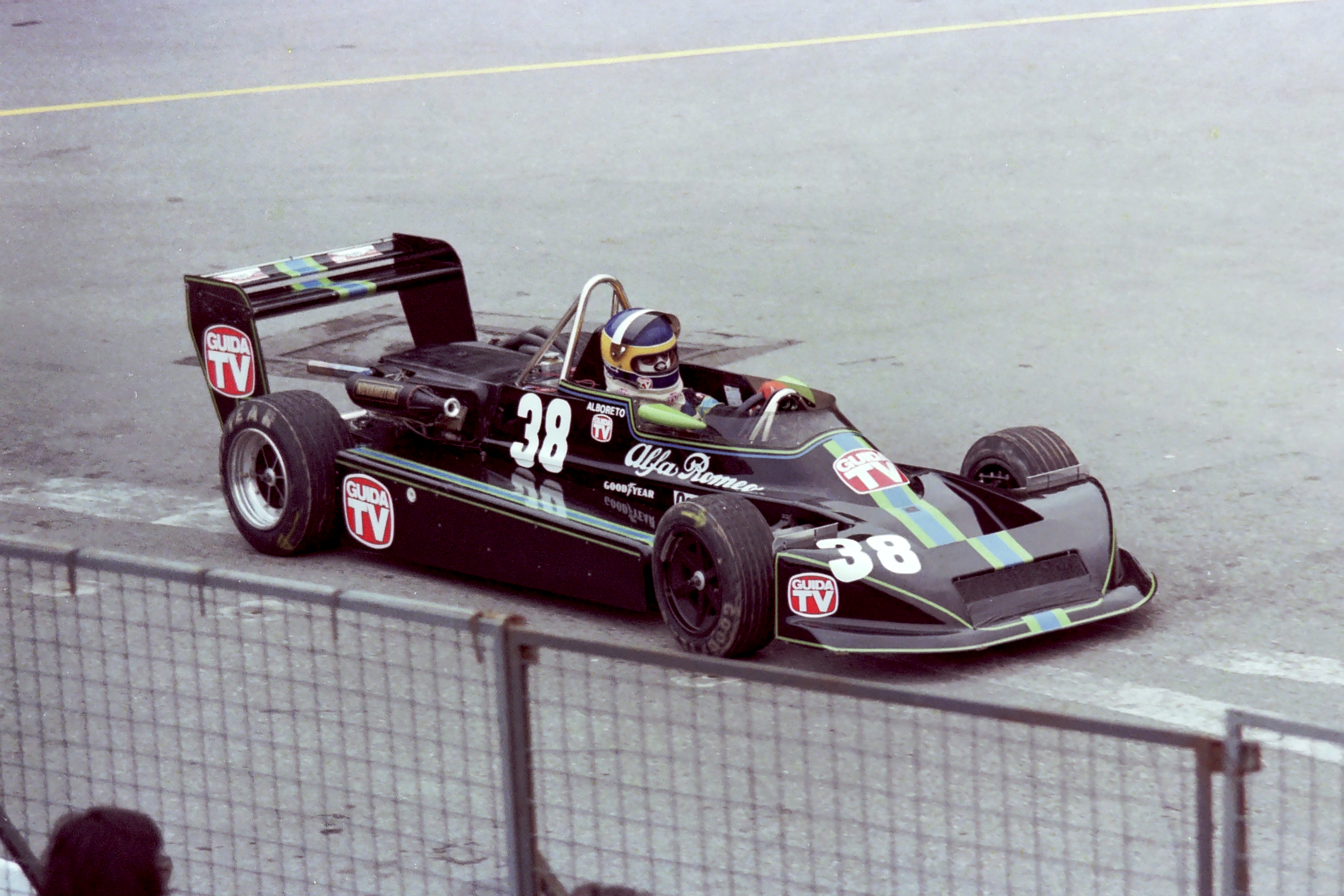
Season winner Michele Alboreto in his March 803-Alfa Romeo, here during the non-championship Monaco round, 17 May 1980

== Calendar ==
Round	Circuit	Date
1	(West Germany) Nürburgring, Nürburg	30 March
2	(Austria) Österreichring, Spielberg	6 April
3	(Belgium) Circuit Zolder, Heusden-Zolder	20 April
4	(France) Circuit de Nevers Magny-Cours, Magny-Cours	27 April
5	(Netherlands) Circuit Park Zandvoort, Zandvoort	26 May
6	(France) Circuit de la Châtre, La Châtre	1 June
7	(Italy) Mugello Circuit, Scarperia e San Piero	15 June
8	(Italy) Autodromo Nazionale Monza, Monza	29 June
9	(Italy) Circuito Internazionale Santa Monica, Misano Adriatico	27 July
10	(Sweden) Ring Knutstorp, Kågeröd	10 August
11	(United Kingdom) Silverstone Circuit, Northamptonshire	7 September
12	(Spain) Circuito del Jarama, Madrid	21 September
13	(West Germany) Kassel-Calden Circuit, Kassel	5 October
14	(Belgium) Circuit Zolder, Heusden-Zolder	12 October

== Results ==
Round	Circuit	Pole position	Fastest lap	Winning driver	Winning team	Report
1	(West Germany) Nürburgring	(Belgium) Thierry Boutsen	(France) Philippe Alliot	(Belgium) Thierry Boutsen	Oreca	Report
2	(Austria) Österreichring		(Belgium) Thierry Boutsen	(Italy) Michele Alboreto	Euroracing	Report
3	(Belgium) Circuit Zolder, Heusden-Zolder		(Belgium) Thierry Boutsen	(Belgium) Thierry Boutsen	Oreca	Report
4	(France) Circuit de Nevers Magny-Cours	(Italy) Michele Alboreto	(France) Philippe Alliot	(Belgium) Thierry Boutsen	Oreca	Report
5	(Netherlands) Circuit Park Zandvoort		(Italy) Mauro Baldi	(Italy) Mauro Baldi	Oreca	Report
6	(France) Circuit de la Châtre	(Belgium) Thierry Boutsen	(Belgium) Thierry Boutsen	(Italy) Michele Alboreto	Euroracing	Report
7	(Italy) Mugello Circuit	(France) Philippe Alliot	(Italy) Corrado Fabi	(Italy) Corrado Fabi	Euroracing	Report
8	(Italy) Autodromo Nazionale Monza	(Italy) Carlo Rossi	(Italy) Michele Alboreto	(Italy) Michele Alboreto	Euroracing	Report
9	(Italy) Circuito Internazionale Santa Monica	(France) Alain Ferté	(Italy) Mauro Baldi	(Italy) Mauro Baldi	Oreca	Report
10	(Sweden) Ring Knutstorp	(Italy) Corrado Fabi	(Italy) Corrado Fabi	(Italy) Corrado Fabi	Euroracing	Report
11	(United Kingdom) Silverstone Circuit		(Italy) Corrado Fabi	(South Africa) Mike White	Gerard Racing	Report
12	(Spain) Circuito del Jarama	(Italy) Mauro Baldi	(Italy) Mauro Baldi	(Italy) Mauro Baldi	Oreca	Report
13	(West Germany) Kassel-Calden Circuit	(Italy) Michele Alboreto	(Italy) Corrado Fabi	(Italy) Michele Alboreto	Euroracing	Report
14	(Belgium) Circuit Zolder	(France) Philippe Streiff	(Italy) Corrado Fabi	(France) Philippe Streiff	Ecurie Motul Nogaro	Report

== Championship standings ==
=== Drivers' championship ===
Place	Driver	Car - Engine	Total
1	(Italy) Michele Alboreto	March 803-Alfa Romeo	60
2	(Belgium) Thierry Boutsen	Martini MK31-Toyota	54
3	(Italy) Corrado Fabi	March 803-Alfa Romeo	50
4	(Italy) Mauro Baldi	Martini MK31-Renault; Martini MK31-Toyota	45
5	(France) Philippe Alliot	Martini MK31-Toyota	39
6	(France) Philippe Streiff	Martini MK31-Toyota	18
7	(Denmark) Kurt Thiim	Chevron B38-Toyota; Ralt RT3-Toyota	13
8	(France) Alain Ferté	Martini MK27-Renault	12
9	(South Africa) Mike White	March 803-Toyota	9
9	(Italy) Enzo Coloni	March 783-Toyota	9
11	(Argentina) Oscar Larrauri	Martini MK31-Toyota	7
12	(New Zealand) Rob Wilson	Ralt RT3-Toyota	6
13	(France) Pascal Fabre	Martini MK31-Toyota	5
13	(West Germany) Frank Jelinski	Ralt RT3-Toyota	5
15	(Netherlands) Michael Bleekemolen	Ralt RT1-Toyota	4
16	(Belgium) Thierry Tassin	Argo JM6-Toyota	3
17	(Italy) Eddy Bianchi	Ralt RT1-Toyota	2
17	(Republic of Ireland) Eddie Jordan	Ralt RT3-Toyota	2
19	(Italy) Vinicio Salmi	Martini MK31-Toyota	1
19	(Italy) Guido Cappellotto	Ralt RT1-Toyota	1
19	(Italy) Roberto Campominosi	March 803-Alfa Romeo	1
19	(West Germany) Wolfgang Klein	Ralt RT3-Toyota	1
