= 1983 FIA European Formula 3 Championship =

Open-wheel motor race series

Seasons
- ← 1982 1984 →

The 1983 FIA European Formula 3 Championship was the ninth edition of the FIA European Formula 3 Championship. The championship consisted of 16 rounds across the continent. The season was won by Italian Pierluigi Martini, with John Nielsen second and Emanuele Pirro in third.

== Calendar ==
Round	Circuit	Date
1	(Italy) ACI Vallelunga Circuit, Campagnano di Roma	13 March
2	(West Germany) Nürburgring, Nürburg	27 March
3	(Belgium) Circuit Zolder, Heusden-Zolder	17 April
4	(France) Circuit de Nevers Magny-Cours, Magny-Cours	1 May
5	(Austria) Österreichring, Spielberg	22 May
6	(France) Circuit de la Châtre, La Châtre	5 June
7	(United Kingdom) Silverstone Circuit, Northamptonshire	12 June
8	(Italy) Autodromo Nazionale Monza, Monza	26 June
9	(Italy) Circuito Internazionale Santa Monica, Misano Adriatico	9 July
10	(Netherlands) Circuit Park Zandvoort, Zandvoort	31 July
11	(Sweden) Ring Knutstorp, Kågeröd	7 August
12	(France) Circuit Paul Armagnac, Nogaro	4 September
13	(Spain) Circuito del Jarama, Madrid	11 September
14	(Italy) Autodromo Dino Ferrari, Imola	25 September
15	(United Kingdom) Donington Park, Leicestershire	9 October
16	(France) Circuit de Croix-en-Ternois, Croix-en-Ternois	23 October

== Results ==
Round	Circuit	Pole position	Fastest lap	Winning driver	Winning team	Report
1	(Italy) ACI Vallelunga Circuit	(Italy) Emanuele Pirro	(Italy) Pierluigi Martini	(Italy) Emanuele Pirro	MC Motorsport	Report
2	(West Germany) Nürburgring	event cancelled due to snow				Report
3	(Belgium) Circuit Zolder	(Republic of Ireland) Tommy Byrne	(Austria) Gerhard Berger	(Italy) Emanuele Pirro	MC Motorsport	Report
4	(France) Circuit de Nevers Magny-Cours	(Republic of Ireland) Tommy Byrne	(Switzerland) Jo Zeller	(Denmark) John Nielsen	Volkswagen Motorsport	Report
5	(Austria) Österreichring	(Italy) Emanuele Pirro	(Italy) Pierluigi Martini	(Republic of Ireland) Tommy Byrne	Eddie Jordan Racing	Report
6	(France) Circuit de la Châtre		(Italy) Roberto Ravaglia	(Italy) Roberto Ravaglia	Trivellato Racing Team	Report
7	(United Kingdom) Silverstone Circuit	(United Kingdom) Martin Brundle	(United Kingdom) Johnny Dumfries	(United Kingdom) Martin Brundle	Eddie Jordan Racing	Report
8	(Italy) Autodromo Nazionale Monza	(Italy) Roberto Ravaglia	(Italy) Pierluigi Martini	(Denmark) John Nielsen	Volkswagen Motorsport	Report
9	(Italy) Circuito Internazionale Santa Monica	(Republic of Ireland) Tommy Byrne	(Republic of Ireland) Tommy Byrne	(Republic of Ireland) Tommy Byrne	Eddie Jordan Racing	Report
10	(Netherlands) Circuit Park Zandvoort	(Denmark) John Nielsen	(Denmark) John Nielsen	(Denmark) John Nielsen	Volkswagen Motorsport	Report
11	(Sweden) Ring Knutstorp	(Denmark) John Nielsen	(Denmark) John Nielsen	(Denmark) John Nielsen	Volkswagen Motorsport	Report
12	(France) Circuit Paul Armagnac	(Denmark) John Nielsen	(Denmark) John Nielsen	(Italy) Pierluigi Martini	Pavesi Racing	Report
13	(Spain) Circuito del Jarama	(Italy) Pierluigi Martini	(Italy) Pierluigi Martini	(Italy) Pierluigi Martini	Pavesi Racing	Report
14	(Italy) Autodromo Dino Ferrari	(Italy) Pierluigi Martini	(Denmark) John Nielsen	(Italy) Pierluigi Martini	Pavesi Racing	Report
15	(United Kingdom) Donington Park	(United Kingdom) Martin Brundle	(Italy) Ruggero Melgrati	(United Kingdom) Martin Brundle	Eddie Jordan Racing	Report
16	(France) Circuit de Croix-en-Ternois	(Italy) Pierluigi Martini	(Italy) Pierluigi Martini	(Italy) Pierluigi Martini	Pavesi Racing	Report

== Championship standings ==
=== Drivers' championship ===
Pos	Driver	VAL (Italy)	NÜR (West Germany)	ZOL (Belgium)	MAG (France)	OST (Austria)	LAC (France)	SIL (United Kingdom)	MNZ (Italy)	MIS (Italy)	ZAN (Netherlands)	KNU (Sweden)	NOG (France)	JAR (Spain)	IMO (Italy)	DON (United Kingdom)	CRO (France)	Pts
1	(Italy) Pierluigi Martini	3	C	Ret	Ret	4		Ret	5	2	2	4	1	1	1	2	1	66
2	(Denmark) John Nielsen	2	C	Ret	1	Ret	Ret	7	1	Ret	1	1	3	3	2	4	4	62
3	(Italy) Emanuele Pirro	1	C	1	13	3	Ret	Ret	6	Ret	3	3	2	2	4	9	2	52
4	(Republic of Ireland) Tommy Byrne		C	4	5	1	Ret	2	3	1	7	8	5	Ret	Ret	12	Ret	35
5	(Italy) Roberto Ravaglia	Ret	C	6	Ret	Ret	1	4	2	3	5	6	8	5	Ret	13	3	32
6	(Belgium) Didier Theys		C	2	Ret	5	2	3	Ret	13	4	5	6	6	8	8	7	25
7	(United Kingdom) Martin Brundle							1								1		18
=	(Austria) Gerhard Berger		C	3	6	2		13	Ret	7	11	2	Ret	Ret	6			18
9	(Italy) Claudio Langes		C	Ret	Ret	19	4	Ret	Ret	6	Ret	Ret	Ret	4	5	5		11
10	(France) Pascal Fabre	6	C	5	Ret	6	3	11	8	9	10	7	Ret					8
11	(Denmark) Kris Nissen		C	10	4	14	Ret	6		4	Ret		7	Ret	Ret	15		7
12	(France) François Hesnault				2								13					6
=	(France) Michel Ferté		C		3		5						12					6
=	(Italy) Enzo Coloni	4							4									6
15	(Italy) Ivan Capelli	8													3		6	5
16	(United Kingdom) James Weaver						10	Ret								3		4
=	(Italy) Ruggero Melgrati	5	C		Ret	9	7	9	7	16	Ret	10	Ret	8	11	7	5	4
18	(Switzerland) Bernard Santal		C	Ret	12	22	13	8	Ret		16	Ret	4	10	12			3
=	(Spain) Carlos Abella							5						11		6		3
20	(Netherlands) John Bosch	19	C	9	Ret	12		20	14	5								2
21	(Switzerland) Max Busslinger	12		16	16	15	6	Ret	10									1
=	(Denmark) Kurt Thiim										6	16			9	10	10	1
-	(France) Cathy Muller	11	C	11	7	7	11	15	Ret	12	14	Ret	9	9	10	18	9	0
-	(Italy) Alfredo Sebastiani	7																0
-	(Switzerland) Jakob Bordoli	9	C	7	Ret	18									13			0
-	(France) Philippe Huart					7	9			15			11			Ret		0
-	(Italy) Franco Forini	16													7			0
-	(Switzerland) Jo Zeller			8	8	8			DSQ	10	9	9			Ret	Ret	11	0
-	(Italy) Stefano Livio	10																0
-	(Switzerland) Urs Dudler					11				17								0
-	(Belgium) Marc Duez			12														0
-	(Sweden) Haase Thaung					13						12						0
-	(Sweden) Thorbjörn Carlsson					16						11						0
-	(United States) Tommy Grunnah					20												0
-	(Italy) Antonio Padrone					23												0
-	(Denmark) Jan Thoelke					24												0
-	(Italy) Oscar Pedersoli	13	C	20	9													0
-	(France) Hans-Peter Pandur			13		Ret											12	0
-	(Italy) Franco Scapini	14																0
-	(Finland) Harri Kangas			14		10												0
-	(France) Patrick Gonin				14								10					0
-	(Canada) Allen Berg							10			12							0
-	(United Kingdom) Richard Trott							12										0
-	(United States) Davy Jones							14										0
-	(United Kingdom) Calvin Fish							16										0
-	(United States) Eric Lang							17										0
-	(United Kingdom) Tony Trevor							19								Ret		0
-	(United Kingdom) Mike Blanchet							21										0
-	(United Kingdom) Tim Lee-Davey							22										0
-	(Jamaica) Carlton Tingling							23										0
-	(Italy) Marco Spinelli	15																0
-	(France) Marc Sourd				15		12						16					0
-	(Italy) Gianfranco Tacchino	17																0
-	(West Germany) Harald Brutschin			17														0
-	(Italy) Luigi Giannini	18																0
-	(West Germany) Bartl Stadler			18		Ret												0
-	(Spain) Jose-Luis Llobell			19	10	21		Ret	Ret	8			Ret	Ret	Ret	17		0
-	(Italy) Walter Voulaz	20																0
-	(West Germany) Lars Schneider			21														0
-	(Spain) Adrian Campos			22	11			18	9	11	Ret		Ret	7	Ret	Ret		0
-	(Switzerland) Marcel Wettstein			23														0
-	(Austria) Franz Konrad	Ret	C	Ret		17												0
-	(West Germany) Volker Weidler			Ret														0
-	(Argentina) Enrique Benamo			Ret	Ret		8	Ret										0
-	(France) Olivier Grouillard				Ret		14						14					0
-	(France) Frederic Delavallade				Ret								15					0
-	(Italy) Paolo Giangrossi				Ret													0
-	(Austria) Johann Reindl					Ret												0
-	(United Kingdom) David Leslie							Ret										0
-	(Sweden) Mario Hytten							Ret										0
-	(United Kingdom) Johnny Dumfries							Ret								Ret		0
-	(Brazil) Ayrton Senna							Ret										0
-	(United Kingdom) Martin Wood							Ret										0
-	(Canada) Steve Bradley							Ret										0
-	(Italy) Giovanni Bertaccini								11									0
-	(Italy) Angelo Scifoni								12									0
-	(Italy) Ivone Pinton								13									0
-	(Switzerland) Hanspeter Kaufmann									13								0
-	(Italy) Francesco Baldasseroni									18								0
-	(Austria) Ernst Franzmaier									19					15			0
-	(Italy) Carlo Betti								Ret									0
-	(Italy) Alfredo Merelli								Ret									0
-	(Netherlands) Cor Euser										8					14		0
-	(Netherlands) Fred Krab										13							0
-	(France) Pascal Pessiot										15						Ret	0
-	(Belgium) Bruno di Gioia										17							0
-	(West Germany) Thomas von Löwis										Ret							0
-	(Sweden) Tomas Kaiser											13						0
-	(Sweden) Johnny Sigfridsson											15						0
-	(Sweden) Nettan Lindgren-Jansson											17						0
-	(Sweden) Jan-Olov Tingdal											DSQ						0
-	(Sweden) Hakan Olausson											Ret						0
-	(Sweden) Stanley Dickens											Ret						0
-	(Sweden) Johan Rajamäki											Ret						0
-	(Sweden) Leo Andersson											Ret				19		0
-	(France) Gilles Lempereur												17					0
-	(Switzerland) Pierre-Alain Lombardi												Ret					0
-	(Switzerland) Fredy Eschenmoser														14			0
-	(Italy) Arturo Merzario														16			0
-	(Austria) Walter Lechner														Ret	16	Ret	0
-	(United Kingdom) Paul Jackson															11		0
-	(United Kingdom) Russell Spence															13		0
-	(West Germany) Karl-Christian Lück															Ret		0
-	(United Kingdom) David Hunt															Ret		0
Pos	Driver	VAL (Italy)	NÜR (West Germany)	ZOL (Belgium)	MAG (France)	OST (Austria)	LAC (France)	SIL (United Kingdom)	MNZ (Italy)	MIS (Italy)	ZAN (Netherlands)	KNU (Sweden)	NOG (France)	JAR (Spain)	IMO (Italy)	DON (United Kingdom)	CRO (France)	Pts
