= Roberto Ravaglia =

Italian racing driver (born 1957)

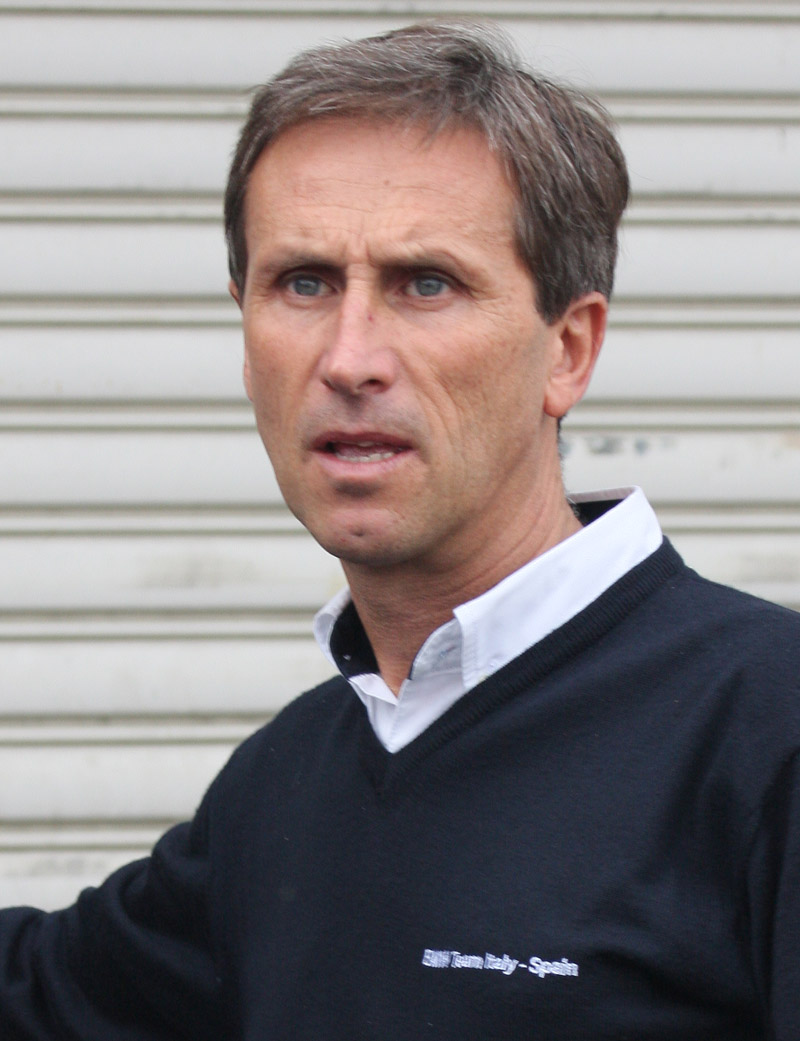
- In 2008, as the director of BMW Team Italy-Spain
- Nationality: (Italy) Italian
- Born: 26 May 1957 (age 69) Venice, Italy

Previous series
- 1981-1982 1982-1983 1984-1988 1985-1992 1987 1990-1996 1993-1995 1994 & 1996 1994-1995 1997: Italian F3; European F3; European Touring Car Championship; Deutsche Tourenwagen Meisterschaft; World Touring Car Championship; Italian Touring Car Championship; FIA Touring Car World Cup; British Touring Car Championship; Super Tourenwagen Cup; FIA GT Championship

Championship titles
- 1986 & 1988 1987 1989 1990, 1991, 1993: European Touring Car Championship; World Touring Car Championship; Deutsche Tourenwagen Meisterschaft; Italian Touring Car Championship

24 Hours of Le Mans career
- Years: 1990, 1997
- Teams: Toyota Team Tom's, BMW Schnitzer Motorsport
- Best finish: 3rd (1997)
- Class wins: 0

Roberto Ravaglia (born 26 May 1957) is an Italian former racing driver, who currently runs ROAL Motorsport, who operate a Chevrolet operation in the World Touring Car Championship. Before retiring in 1997, he was one of the most successful touring car racing drivers, primarily for BMW, and won seven titles in four different championships.

== Racing career ==
Ravaglia was twice Italian karting champion and raced in Formula 3 in the early 1980s. In 1984, he made his touring car debut, becoming European Touring Car Championship champion in 1986, and successfully defending the title in 1987 and 1988 (though in 1987 it was the World Touring Car Championship), with some races outside Europe including the Macau Grand Prix Guia Touring Car races and the James Hardie 1000 in Australia. Later in the 1988 season, he was unable to defend his Macau win due to breaking a rib in a road accident driving his Fiat Uno. He switched with BMW to the DTM in 1989, and the Italian Superturismo Championship in 1990, winning both on the first attempt. He was also champion in 1991 and 1993. One of the few unsuccessful seasons of his career was 1996 in the British Touring Car Championship, despite finishing a credible sixth and picking up a win at the British GP support race. He also came in 4th at Supertourismo that year. He was now approaching 40 and did not win another championship as a driver.

Ravaglia was also successful in the famed Spa 24 Hours race at the Circuit de Spa-Francorchamps in Belgium, winning the race three times. He won his first 24 hours in 1985 driving a BMW 635 CSi partnered by Formula One drivers Gerhard Berger and Marc Surer. He followed that win with a third place in 1986 and second in 1987 before winning again in 1988 in a BMW M3 partnered by Dieter Quester and Altfrid Heger. His last win in the Ardennes round the clock classic came in 1994. Again driving a BMW, this time the BMW 318is partnered by Thierry Tassin and Alexander Burgstaller.

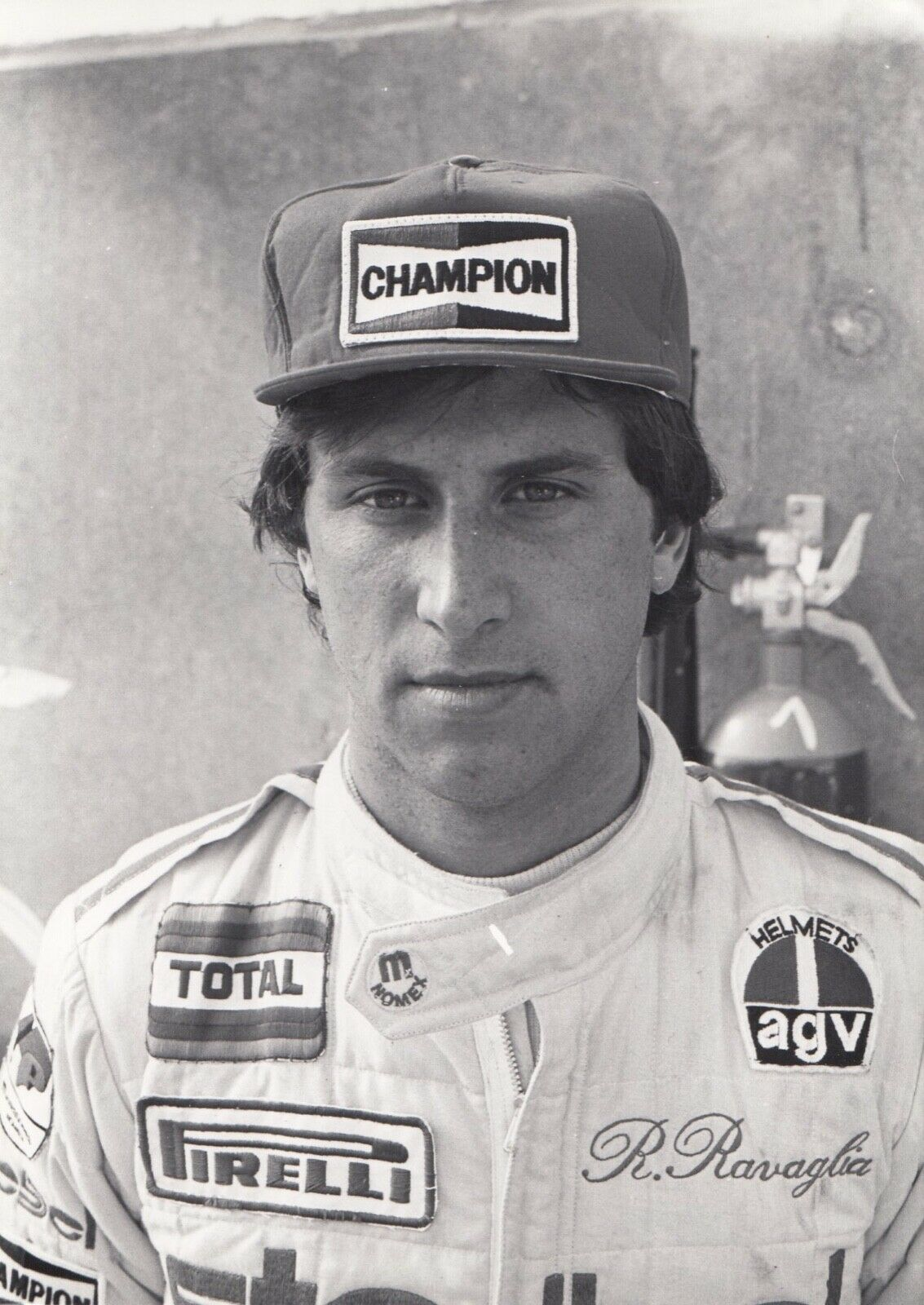
Ravaglia at Zolder for the 1982 FIA European Formula 3 Championship

Ravaglia made three visits to Australia during his racing career, all to drive in the Bathurst 1000. In his debut race in 1985, he finished a fine second with Venezuelan Johnny Cecotto in the Schnitzer BMW 635 CSi which had earlier in the year finished second at Spa, with both drivers sharing the "Rookie of the Year" award. The car, run by Australian Greg "Pee Wee" Siddle and under the name of "Goold Motorsport" and sponsored by retired Australian racer and successful tyre retailer Bob Jane, was initially to be driven by Formula One drivers Riccardo Patrese and Gerhard Berger, but the race was run on the same day as the European Grand Prix at Brands Hatch in England. Ravaglia and Cecotto's effort was all the more impressive considering that their Sebring Orange 635 CSi was down on power throughout qualifying and the race with a small electrical gremlin which the Schnitzer mechanics didn't manage to successfully cure.

Ravaglia returned in 1986, again in a Schnitzer 635 for Goold Motorsport, this time painted in BMW's famous cut-away paint scheme, and initially qualified a surprising second before ending up 9th on the grid after the "Hardies Heroes" Top 10 run-off. To his credit, Ravaglia stated his time wouldn't have been possible in qualifying proper without the tow he got from one of the faster V8 Holden Commodore's on the run up Mountain Straight and on the almost 2 km long Conrod Straight, and attributed that lack of a tow in the runoff for his falling to ninth. Partnering former ETCC champion Dieter Quester, his race unfortunately ended early when he clashed on lap 2 of 163 with the Jaguar XJS of 1985 winner John Goss. In an uncharacteristic show of raw emotion, Ravaglia physically attacked Goss in the pits after Goss finished his opening driving stint believing the Australian to be totally at fault for the accident and had to be restrained by his team. He later apologised to Goss and professed regret for his actions. Goss, who said in an interview with race broadcaster Channel 7 that he was "astounded" about incident in the pits (but didn't name Ravaglia as the other driver), declined the option from race officials to have action taken against the Italian believing it to be just "one of those things".

Ravaglia returned to Australia for two rounds of the inaugural World Touring Car Championship. The first being the 1987 James Hardie 1000, which was a disaster for the Schnitzer team and Roberto. After crashing his BMW M3 at the top of the mountain during qualifying, he suffered heavy bruising to his ribs which required strapping. Following his final stint at the wheel during the race, he was taken to the tracks medical centre after collapsing from exhaustion and dehydration from the physical effort of having to drive the little car around the 6.213 km long Mount Panorama Circuit with bruised ribs that were reportedly strapped too tight, making it hard for him to breathe. His last race in Australia was a week later in the Bob Jane T-Marts 500 at the Calder Park Raceway in Melbourne, a unique track that combined the 2.280 km (1.417 mi) road course with the then new 1.801 km (1.119 mi) NASCAR style high banked "Thunderdome". Again teamed with Italian Emanuele Pirro, the pair qualified their M3 9th, but would enjoy a much better race than at Bathurst, finishing 2nd behind the Steve Soper / Pierre Dieudonné Texaco Ford Sierra RS500.

Ravaglia was also successful in other 24-hour races, twice winning the famous Nürburgring 24 Hours. His first win came in 1989 driving a BMW M3 with another F1 driver (and regular ETCC/WTCC co-driver) Emanuele Pirro and Frenchman Fabien Giroix. His last 24-hour win at the famous Nürburgring was in 1995 driving a BMW 320i with Marc Duez and Alexander Burgstaller.

== Team management ==
In 2001, Ravaglia founded his own racing team, Ravaglia Motorsport (now ROAL Motorsport), with Aldo Preo. The team took part in the European Touring Car Championship with support from BMW Motorsport, and their driver Peter Kox won the Super Production class championship in the first season. The entry name of the BMW squad was BMW Team Germany in 2001, but it changed to BMW Team Spain in the next season and has been BMW Team Italy-Spain since 2003. The team currently competes in the World Touring Car Championship.

== Racing Career Highlights ==
=== as Driver ===
1985
Winner of the 24 Hours of Spa
1986
European Touring Car Championship champion
1987
World Touring Car Championship champion
Winner of the Guia Race
1988
European Touring Car Championship champion
Winner of the 24 Hours of Spa
1989
Deutsche Tourenwagen Meisterschaft (DTM) champion
Winner of the 24 Hours Nürburgring Nordschleife
1990
Italian Touring Car Championship champion
1991
Italian Touring Car Championship champion
1992
Third in Guia Race
1993
Italian Touring Car Championship champion
1994
Winner of the 24 Hours of Spa
1995
Winner of the 24 Hours Nürburgring Nordschleife

=== as Team director ===
2001
FIA European Super Touring Championship Super Production class champion for Peter Kox (Ravaglia BMW)
2005
Italian Superturismo Championship champion for Alessandro Zanardi (Ravaglia BMW)

== Career results ==
Results sourced from Driver Database.

Season	Series	Position	Car	Team
1980	Formula Fiat Abarth	5th	Fiat Abarth	
1981	Italian Formula Three Championship	5th	Dallara 381 Toyota	Trivellato Racing
1982	Italian Formula Three Championship	17th	Dallara 382 Alfa Romeo	Trivellato Racing
1982	European Formula 3 Championship	10th	Dallara 382 Alfa Romeo	Trivellato Racing
1983	European Formula 3 Championship	5th	Ralt RT3 Alfa Romeo	Trivellato Racing
1985	European Touring Car Championship	20th	BMW 635 CSi	Schnitzer Motorsport
1985	Deutsche Tourenwagen Meisterschaft	16th	BMW 635 CSi	Schnitzer Motorsport
1985	Australian Endurance Championship	15th	BMW 635 CSi	Goold Motorsport
1986	European Touring Car Championship	1st	BMW 635 CSi	Schnitzer Motorsport
1987	World Touring Car Championship	1st	BMW M3	Schnitzer Motorsport
1988	Nissan Mobil 500 series	1st	BMW M3	Schnitzer Motorsport
1988	European Touring Car Championship	1st	BMW M3	Schnitzer Motorsport
1988	World Sportscar Championship	61st	Cougar C20 Porsche	Courage Compétition
1988	Asia-Pacific Touring Car Championship	3rd	BMW M3	Schnitzer Motorsport
1989	Nissan Mobil 500 series	3rd	BMW M3	Schnitzer Motorsport
1989	Deutsche Tourenwagen Meisterschaft	1st	BMW M3	Schnitzer Motorsport
1990	Deutsche Tourenwagen Meisterschaft	16th	BMW M3 Evolution	Schnitzer Motorsport
1990	Italian Superturismo Championship	1st	BMW M3 Evolution	Schnitzer Motorsport
1991	Italian Superturismo Championship	1st	BMW M3 Evolution	BMW Italia / CiBiEmme Engineering
1992	Deutsche Tourenwagen Meisterschaft	7th	BMW M3 Evolution	Schnitzer Motorsport
1992	Italian Superturismo Championship	7th	BMW M3 Evolution	Schnitzer Motorsport
1993	FIA Touring Car Challenge	24th	BMW 318i	CiBiEmme
1993	Italian Superturismo Championship	1st	BMW 318i	CiBiEmme Engineering
1994	FIA Touring Car World Cup	10th	BMW 318i	CiBiEmme Engineering
1994	Super Tourenwagen Cup	20th	BMW 318i	BMW Team Bigazzi
1994	Italian Superturismo Championship	4th	BMW 318is	CiBiEmme Engineering
1994	British Touring Car Championship	18th	BMW 318is	Schnitzer Motorsport
1995	FIA Touring Car World Cup	19th	BMW 318is	BMW Team Bigazzi
1995	Deutscher Tourenwagen Cup	6th	BMW 318is	BMW Team Bigazzi
1996	Italian Superturismo Championship	4th	BMW 320i	Team Bigazzi
1996	British Touring Car Championship	6th	BMW 320i	Schnitzer Motorsport
1997	FIA GT Championship	8th	McLaren F1 GTR	Schnitzer Motorsport

=== Complete European Formula 3 results ===
(key) (Races in bold indicate pole position) (Races in italics indicate fastest lap)

Year	Team	Engine	1	2	3	4	5	6	7	8	9	10	11	12	13	14	15	16	DC	Pts
1982	Scuderia Vesuvio	Alfa Romeo	**MUG**; 5	NÜR; 7	DON; Ret	ZOL; 6	MAG; Ret	ÖST; 11	ZAN	SIL	MNZ; 6	PER; 3	LAC; 7	KNU	NOG; 7	JAR; Ret	KAS; 7		10th	8
1983	Trivellato Racing	Alfa Romeo	VLL; Ret	NÜR; C	ZOL; 6	MAG; Ret	ÖST; Ret	**LAC**; 1	SIL; 4	**MNZ**; 2	MIS; 3	ZAN; 5	KNU; 6	NOG; 8	JAR; 5	IMO; Ret	DON; 13	CET; 3	5th	32

=== Complete European Touring Car Championship results ===
Results sourced from History of Touring Car Racing.

(key) (Races in bold indicate pole position) (Races in italics indicate fastest lap)

Year	Team	Car	1	2	3	4	5	6	7	8	9	10	11	12	13	14	DC	Pts
1984	Schnitzer Motorsport	BMW 635 CSi	MNZ; Ret	VAL; Ret	DON; Ret	PER; Ret	BRN	ZEL; 18	SAL; 8	NÜR; 8	SPA; Ret	SIL; Ret	ZOL; Ret	MUG; 1			NA	NA
1985	Schnitzer Motorsport	BMW 635 CSi	MNZ; Ret	VAL; 5	DON	AND	BRN; 3	ZEL	SAL; 8	NÜR; 4	SPA; 1	SIL	NOG	ZOL; 4	EST; 3	JAR; 7	20th	104
1986	Schnitzer Motorsport	BMW 635 CSi	MNZ; Ret	DON; 2	HOC; 2	MIS; 1	AND; Ret	BRN; 6	ZEL; 3	NÜR; 1	SPA; 3	SIL; 2	NOG; 1	ZOL; 2	JAR; 1	EST; 9	1st	211
1987	Schnitzer Motorsport	BMW M3	DON; 7	EST	AND	ZOL	ZEL; DNS	IMO	NOG								NA	22
1988	Schnitzer Motorsport	BMW M3	MNZ; 6	DON; 1	EST; 2	JAR; 3	DIJ; 3	VAL; 2	NÜR; 4	SPA; 1	ZOL; 1	SIL; 7	NOG; 2				1st	297

=== Complete Deutsche Tourenwagen Meisterschaft results ===
(key) (Races in bold indicate pole position) (Races in italics indicate fastest lap)

Year	Team	Car	1	2	3	4	5	6	7	8	9	10	11	12	13	14	15	16	17	18	19	20	21	22	23	24	Pos.	Pts
1985	Team Schnitzer	BMW 635 CSi	**ZOL**; 2	WUN; 7	AVU	MFA	ERD	ERD	DIE	DIE	ZOL	SIE	NÜR														16th	30
1988	BMW M Team Schnitzer	BMW M3 Evo	ZOL; 1	ZOL; 2	HOC; 1	HOC; 2	NÜR; 1	NÜR; 2	BRN; 1	BRN; 2	AVU; 1	AVU; 2	MFA; 1	MFA; 2	NÜR; 1	NÜR; 2	NOR; 1	NOR; 2	WUN; 1	WUN; 2	SAL; 1 C	SAL; 2 C	HUN; 1	HUN; 2	HOC; 1	HOC; 2	NC	0
1989	BMW M Team Schnitzer	BMW M3 Evo	**ZOL**; **1**; 1	**ZOL**; **2**; 1	HOC; 1; 6	HOC; 2 Ret	**NÜR**; **1**; 24	NÜR; 2 DNS	MFA; 1; 3	MFA; 2; 2	AVU; 1; 1	**AVU**; **2**; 5	NÜR; 1; 3	NÜR; 2; 3	NOR; 1; 4	NOR; 2; 4	**HOC**; **1**; 5	HOC; 2; 5	DIE; 1; 2	DIE; 2; 9	NÜR; 1; 4	NÜR; 2; 6	HOC; 1; 10	HOC; 2; 2			1st	285
1990	BMW M Team Schnitzer	BMW M3 Sport Evo	ZOL; 1	ZOL; 2	HOC; 1	HOC; 2	NÜR; 1	NÜR; 2	AVU; 1	AVU; 2	MFA; 1	MFA; 2	WUN; 1	WUN; 2	NÜR; 1	NÜR; 2	**NOR**; **1**; 3	NOR; 2; 1	DIE; 1	DIE; 2	NÜR; 1	NÜR; 2	HOC; 1	HOC; 2			16th	32
1992	Schnitzer Motorsport	BMW M3 Sport Evo	ZOL; 1; 8	ZOL; 2; 4	NÜR; 1; 11	NÜR; 2; 6	WUN; 1; 19	WUN; 2; 17	AVU; 1; 15	AVU; 2 Ret	HOC; 1; 6	HOC; 2; 3	NÜR; 1; 8	NÜR; 2; 7	NOR; 1; 5	NOR; 2; 3	BRN; 1; 2	BRN; 2; 3	DIE; 1; 8	DIE; 2 Ret	ALE; 1 Ret	ALE; 2 Ret	NÜR; 1 Ret	NÜR; 2 Ret	HOC; 1; 1	**HOC**; **2**; 1	7th	134

=== Complete World Touring Car Championship results ===
(key) (Races in bold indicate pole position) (Races in italics indicate fastest lap)

Year	Team	Car	1	2	3	4	5	6	7	8	9	10	11	DC	Pts
1987	(West Germany) BMW Motorsport	BMW M3	MNZ; DSQ	JAR ovr:1 cls:1	DIJ ovr:2 cls:1	NÜR ovr:2 cls:1	SPA; Ret	BNO ovr:4 cls:2	SIL ovr:2 cls:2	BAT ovr:12 cls:5	CLD ovr:2 cls:1	WEL ovr:2 cls:1	FJI ovr:3 cls:1	1st	269

=== Complete World Sportscar Championship results ===
(key) (Races in bold indicate pole position) (Races in italics indicate fastest lap)

Year	Team	Car	1	2	3	4	5	6	7	8	9	10	11	DC	Pts
1988	(France) Courage Compétition	Cougar C20 Porsche	JER	JAR	MNZ; 7	SIL	LMS	BRN	BRH	NÜR	SPA	FUJ	SAN	61st	8

=== Complete FIA GT Championship results ===
(key) (Races in bold indicate pole position) (Races in italics indicate fastest lap)

Year	Team	Car	Class	1	2	3	4	5	6	7	8	9	10	11	Pos.	Pts
1997	(Germany) Schnitzer Motorsport	McLaren F1 GTR	GT1	HOC; Ret	SIL; 1	HEL; 11	NÜR; 4	SPA; 4	ZEL; Ret	SUZ; 8	DON; 5	MUG; 5	SEB; 2	LAG; 11	8th	26

=== Complete Italian Superturismo Championship results ===
Year	Team	Car	1	2	3	4	5	6	7	8	9	10	11	12	13	14	15	16	17	18	19	20	DC	Pts
1993	CiBiEmme Engineering	BMW 318i	MNZ; 1; 1	MNZ; 2; 2	VAL; 1; 1	VAL; 2; 1	MIS; 1; 5	MIS; 2; 7	MAG; 1; 4	MAG; 2; 3	BIN; 1; 5	BIN; 2; 3	IMO; 1; 5	IMO; 2; 2	VAR; 1; 2	VAR; 2; 10	MIS; 1; 7	MIS; 2; 3	PER; 1; 1	PER; 2; 1	MUG; 1; 9	MUG; 2; 4	1st	233 (236)
1994	CiBiEmme Engineering	BMW 318is	MNZ; 1; 16	MNZ; 2; 6	VAL; 1 Ret	VAL; 2; 6	MAG; 1; 3	MAG; 2; 2	BIN; 1; 3	BIN; 2; 2	MIS; 1; 3	MIS; 2; 2	VAL; 1; 14	VAL; 2; 6	MUG; 1; 1	MUG; 2; 3	PER; 1 Ret	PER; 2; 2	VAR; 1 Ret	VAR; 2 Ret	MUG; 1 Ret	MUG; 2 Ret	4th	146
1996	Scuderia Bigazzi	BMW 320i	MUG; 1	MUG; 2	MAG; 1	MAG; 2	MNZ; 1	MNZ; 2	BIN; 1	BIN; 2	MIS; 1	MIS; 2	IMO; 1	IMO; 2'	PER; 1	PER; 2	PER; 1	PER; 2	VAR; 1; 1	VAR; 2; 2	VAL; 1; 3	**VAL**; **2**; 19	18th	12

=== Complete British Touring Car Championship results ===
(key) (Races in bold indicate pole position - 1 point awarded all races 1996 only) (Races in italics indicate fastest lap)

Year	Team	Car	1	2	3	4	5	6	7	8	9	10	11	12	13	14	15	16	17	18	19	20	21	22	23	24	25	26	Pos.	Pts
1994	BMW Motorsport Team Schnitzer	BMW 318i	THR	BRH; 1	BRH; 2	SNE	SIL; 1 Ret	SIL; 2 Ret	OUL	DON; 1; 12	DON; 2; 9	BRH; 1	BRH; 2	SIL; Ret	KNO; 1	KNO; 2	OUL; 5	BRH; 1	BRH; 2	SIL; 1	SIL; 2	DON; 1	DON; 2						18th	10
1996	BMW Team Schnitzer	BMW 320i	DON; 1; 7	DON; 2; 7	BRH; 1; 6	BRH; 2; 6	THR; 1; 6	THR; 2; 2	**SIL**; **1**; 2	SIL; 2; 2	OUL; 1; 7	OUL; 2; 5	SNE; 1 Ret	SNE; 2 Ret	BRH; 1; 9	BRH; 2 Ret	SIL; 1; 1	SIL; 2; 3	KNO; 1; 3	KNO; 2; 3	OUL; 1; 9	OUL; 2; 5	THR; 1; 4	THR; 2; 5	DON; 1 Ret	DON; 2; 5	BRH; 1 NC	BRH; 2; 2	6th	157

=== Complete Super Tourenwagen Cup results ===
(key) (Races in bold indicate pole position) (Races in italics indicate fastest lap)

Year	Team	Car	1	2	3	4	5	6	7	8	9	10	11	12	13	14	15	16	Pos.	Pts
1994	BMW Team Bigazzi	BMW 318i	AVU	WUN	ZOL	ZAN	ÖST	SAL	SPA; 8	NÜR									20th	3
1995	BMW Team Bigazzi	BMW 318i	ZOL; 1; 5	ZOL; 2; 3	SPA; 1; 2	SPA; 2; 4	ÖST; 1; 4	ÖST; 2; 4	HOC; 1; 9	HOC; 2; 8	NÜR; 1; 5	NÜR; 2 Ret	SAL; 1; 3	SAL; 2; 3	AVU; 1; 6	AVU; 2; 11	NÜR; 1; 8	NÜR; 2 Ret	6th	309

=== Complete Bathurst 1000 results ===
Year	Team	Co-Drivers	Car	Class	Laps	Pos.	Class Pos.
1985	(Australia) / (West Germany) Goold Motorsport	(Venezuela) Johnny Cecotto	BMW 635 CSi	C	163	**2nd**	**2nd**
1986	(Australia) / (West Germany) Goold Motorsport	(Austria) Dieter Quester	BMW 635 CSi	C	2	DNF	DNF
1987	(West Germany) Schnitzer Motorsport	(Italy) Emanuele Pirro (West Germany) Markus Oestreich (Austria) Roland Ratzenberger	BMW M3	2	150	12th	5th

Sporting positions
Preceded by Gianfranco Brancatelli; Thomas Lindström	European Touring Car Champion; 1986	Succeeded by Winfried Vogt
Preceded by none	World Touring Car Champion; 1987	Succeeded by Andy Priaulx (2005)
Preceded by Johnny Cecotto	Guia Race winner 1987	Succeeded by Altfrid Heger
Preceded by Winfried Vogt	European Touring Car Champion; 1988	Succeeded by Fabrizio Giovanardi (2000)
Preceded by Klaus Ludwig	German Touring Car Champion; 1989	Succeeded by Hans-Joachim Stuck
Preceded by Johnny Cecotto	Italian Touring Car Champion; 1990-1991	Succeeded by Nicola Larini
Preceded by Nicola Larini	Italian Touring Car Champion; 1993	Succeeded by Emanuele Pirro
