= 1982 FIA European Formula 3 Championship =

Open-wheel motor race series

Seasons
- ← 1981 1983 →

The 1982 FIA European Formula 3 Championship was the eighth edition of the FIA European Formula 3 Championship. The championship consisted of 15 rounds across the continent. The season was won by Argentine Oscar Larrauri, with Emanuele Pirro second and Alain Ferté in third.

== Calendar ==
| Round | | Circuit | Date |
|---|---|---|---|
| 1 | R1 | (Italy) Mugello Circuit, Scarperia e San Piero | 14 March |
| 1 | R2 | (Italy) Mugello Circuit, Scarperia e San Piero | 14 March |
| 1 | R3 | (Italy) Mugello Circuit, Scarperia e San Piero | 14 March |
| 2 | R1 | (West Germany) Nürburgring, Nürburg | 28 March |
| 2 | R2 | (West Germany) Nürburgring, Nürburg | 28 March |
| 2 | R3 | (West Germany) Nürburgring, Nürburg | 28 March |
| 3 | | (United Kingdom) Donington Park, Leicestershire | 4 April |
| 4 | | (Belgium) Circuit Zolder, Heusden-Zolder | 18 April |
| 5 | | (France) Circuit de Nevers Magny-Cours, Magny-Cours | 2 May |
| 6 | | (Austria) Österreichring, Spielberg | 16 May |
| 7 | | (Netherlands) Circuit Park Zandvoort, Zandvoort | 31 May |
| 8 | | (United Kingdom) Silverstone Circuit, Northamptonshire | 13 June |
| 9 | R1 | (Italy) Autodromo Nazionale Monza, Monza | 27 June |
| 9 | R2 | (Italy) Autodromo Nazionale Monza, Monza | 27 June |
| 9 | R3 | (Italy) Autodromo Nazionale Monza, Monza | 27 June |
| 10 | R1 | (Italy) Autodromo di Pergusa, Pergusa | 4 July |
| 10 | R2 | (Italy) Autodromo di Pergusa, Pergusa | 4 July |
| 10 | R3 | (Italy) Autodromo di Pergusa, Pergusa | 4 July |
| 11 | R1 | (France) Circuit de la Châtre, La Châtre | 18 July |
| 11 | R2 | (France) Circuit de la Châtre, La Châtre | 18 July |
| 11 | R3 | (France) Circuit de la Châtre, La Châtre | 18 July |
| 12 | | (Sweden) Ring Knutstorp, Kågeröd | 8 August |
| 13 | | (France) Circuit Paul Armagnac, Nogaro | 5 September |
| 14 | | (Spain) Circuito del Jarama, Madrid | 12 September |
| 15 | | (West Germany) Kassel-Calden Circuit, Kassel | 3 October |

== Results ==
| Round | | Circuit | Pole position | Fastest lap | Winning driver | Winning team | Report |
|---|---|---|---|---|---|---|---|
| 1 | R1 | (Italy) Mugello Circuit | (Italy) Emanuele Pirro | (Argentina) Oscar Larrauri | (Italy) Emanuele Pirro | Euroracing | Report |
| 1 | R2 | (Italy) Mugello Circuit | (Italy) Roberto Ravaglia | (France) Alain Ferté | (Italy) Roberto Ravaglia | Vesuvio Racing | Report |
| 1 | R3 | (Italy) Mugello Circuit | | (Italy) Emanuele Pirro | (Argentina) Oscar Larrauri | Euroracing | Report |
| 2 | R1 | (West Germany) Nürburgring | (France) Philippe Alliot | (Denmark) John Nielsen | (Denmark) John Nielsen | Volkswagen Motorsport | Report |
| 2 | R2 | (West Germany) Nürburgring | (Argentina) Oscar Larrauri | (France) Alain Ferté | (Argentina) Oscar Larrauri | Euroracing | Report |
| 2 | R3 | (West Germany) Nürburgring | | (Denmark) John Nielsen | (Argentina) Oscar Larrauri | Euroracing | Report |
| 3 | | (United Kingdom) Donington Park | (United Kingdom) James Weaver | (United Kingdom) James Weaver | (United Kingdom) James Weaver | Eddie Jordan Racing | Report |
| 4 | | (Belgium) Circuit Zolder | (Argentina) Oscar Larrauri | (Italy) Paolo Giangrossi | (Argentina) Oscar Larrauri | Euroracing | Report |
| 5 | | (France) Circuit de Nevers Magny-Cours | (Argentina) Oscar Larrauri | (France) Alain Ferté | (France) Alain Ferté | Ecurie Total | Report |
| 6 | | (Austria) Österreichring | (Italy) Emanuele Pirro | (Italy) Emanuele Pirro | (Italy) Emanuele Pirro | Euroracing | Report |
| 7 | | (Netherlands) Circuit Park Zandvoort | (France) Alain Ferté | (Argentina) Oscar Larrauri | (Argentina) Oscar Larrauri | Euroracing | Report |
| 8 | | (United Kingdom) Silverstone Circuit | (United Kingdom) James Weaver | (Italy) Emanuele Pirro | (Italy) Emanuele Pirro | Euroracing | Report |
| 9 | R1 | (Italy) Autodromo Nazionale Monza | (Italy) Emanuele Pirro | (Italy) Emanuele Pirro | (Argentina) Oscar Larrauri | Euroracing | Report |
| 9 | R2 | (Italy) Autodromo Nazionale Monza | (Denmark) John Nielsen | (Italy) Guido Cappellotto | (Denmark) John Nielsen | Volkswagen Motorsport | Report |
| 9 | R3 | (Italy) Autodromo Nazionale Monza | | (Denmark) John Nielsen | (Argentina) Oscar Larrauri | Euroracing | Report |
| 10 | R1 | (Italy) Autodromo di Pergusa | (Argentina) Oscar Larrauri | (Argentina) Oscar Larrauri | (Argentina) Oscar Larrauri | Euroracing | Report |
| 10 | R2 | (Italy) Autodromo di Pergusa | (Italy) Emanuele Pirro | (Italy) Paolo Giangrossi | (Italy) Emanuele Pirro | Euroracing | Report |
| 10 | R3 | (Italy) Autodromo di Pergusa | | (Italy) Emanuele Pirro | (Argentina) Oscar Larrauri | Euroracing | Report |
| 11 | R1 | (France) Circuit de la Châtre | (France) Alain Ferté | (France) Alain Ferté | (France) Alain Ferté | Ecurie Total | Report |
| 11 | R2 | (France) Circuit de la Châtre | (Argentina) Oscar Larrauri | (Italy) Claudio Langes | (Argentina) Oscar Larrauri | Euroracing | Report |
| 11 | R3 | (France) Circuit de la Châtre | | (France) Alain Ferté | (France) Philippe Alliot | Ecurie Total | Report |
| 12 | | (Sweden) Ring Knutstorp | (Argentina) Oscar Larrauri | (Argentina) Oscar Larrauri | (Argentina) Oscar Larrauri | Euroracing | Report |
| 13 | | (France) Circuit Paul Armagnac | (United Kingdom) James Weaver | (Argentina) Oscar Larrauri | (United Kingdom) James Weaver | Eddie Jordan Racing | Report |
| 14 | | (Spain) Circuito del Jarama | (Argentina) Oscar Larrauri | (United Kingdom) James Weaver | (United Kingdom) James Weaver | Eddie Jordan Racing | Report |
| 15 | | (West Germany) Kassel-Calden Circuit | (Argentina) Oscar Larrauri | (Argentina) Oscar Larrauri | (Italy) Emanuele Pirro | Euroracing | Report |

== Championship standings ==
=== Drivers' championship ===
| Place | Driver | Car - Engine | Total |
|---|---|---|---|
| 1 | (Argentina) Oscar Larrauri | Euroracing 101-Alfa Romeo | 91 |
| 2 | (Italy) Emanuele Pirro | Euroracing 101-Alfa Romeo | 62 |
| 3 | (France) Alain Ferté | Martini MK37-Alfa Romeo | 42 |
| 4 | (United Kingdom) James Weaver | Ralt RT3-Toyota | 33 |
| 5 | (Belgium) Didier Theys | Martini MK37-Alfa Romeo | 30 |
| 6 | (France) Philippe Alliot | Martini MK37-Alfa Romeo | 25 |
| 7 | (Italy) Paolo Giangrossi | Ralt RT3-Alfa Romeo | 19 |
| 8 | (Denmark) John Nielsen | Ralt RT3-Volkswagen | 11 |
| 9 | (Italy) Claudio Langes | Anson SA3C-Toyota | 10 |
| 10 | (Italy) Roberto Ravaglia | Dallara 382-Alfa Romeo | 8 |
| 11 | (Switzerland) Jo Zeller | Ralt RT3-Toyota | 6 |
| 12 | (France) Denis Morin | Ralt RT3-Toyota | 5 |
| 13 | (Argentina) Enrique Mansilla | Ralt RT3-Toyota | 4 |
| = | (Denmark) Kurt Thiim | March 813-Toyota | 4 |
| = | (Argentina) Enrique Benamo | Ralt RT3-Toyota | 4 |
| 16 | (Brazil) Roberto Moreno | Ralt RT3-Toyota | 3 |
| = | (Switzerland) Franco Forini | Martini MK37-Alfa Romeo | 3 |
| = | (Switzerland) Bernard Santal | Ralt RT3-Toyota | 3 |
| = | (Austria) Gero Zamagna | Anson SA3C-Toyota | 3 |
| = | (Spain) Carlos Abella | Ralt RT3-Volkswagen | 3 |
| 21 | (Italy) Luigi Giannini | Dallara 382-Toyota | 2 |
| 22 | (Italy) Guido Cappellotto | Ralt RT3-Alfa Romeo | 1 |
| = | (Republic of Ireland) Tommy Byrne | Ralt RT3-Toyota | 1 |
| = | (Italy) Alfredo Sebastiani | Dallara 382-Toyota | 1 |
| = | (Sweden) Bengt Trägardh | Ralt RT3-Volkswagen | 1 |
