= European Formula 3 Championship (disambiguation) =

European Formula 3 Championship is the name of:

- FIA European Formula 3 Championship (established in 1975), a class of auto racing for Formula 3 open wheeled single seater racing cars, which held from 1975 to 1984.
- Formula 3 Euro Series, a class of auto racing for Formula 3 open wheeled single seater racing cars, which was established in 2003 by merging of German and French Formula 3 Championships and was incorporated into European Formula 3 Championship in 2013.
- European Formula 3 Championship, a class of auto racing for Formula 3 open wheeled single seater racing cars, which was established in 2012.
- European F3 Open Championship, the name of the current Euroformula Open Championship from 2009 to 2013.
