= 1979 FIA European Formula 3 Championship =

Open-wheel motor race series

Seasons
- ← 1978 1980 →

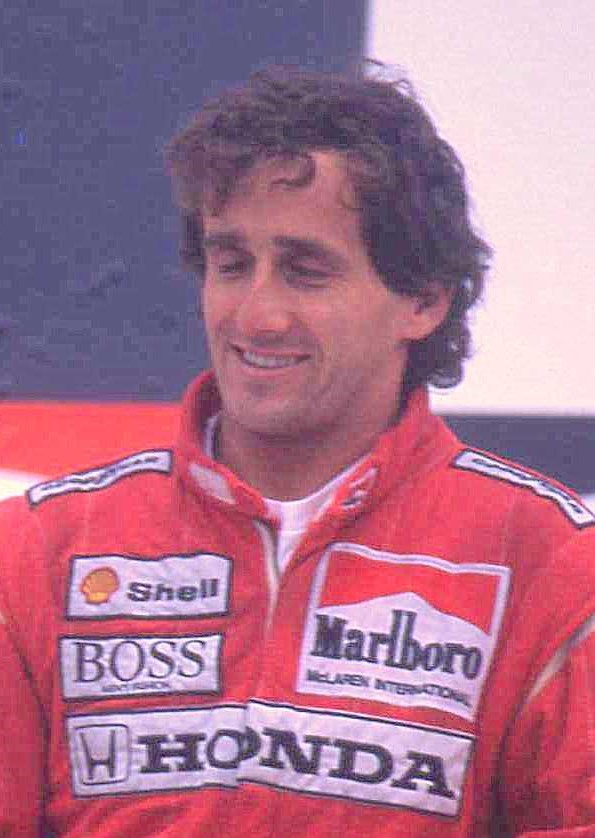
1979 champion, Alain Prost

The 1979 FIA European Formula 3 Championship was the fifth edition of the FIA European Formula 3 Championship. The championship consisted of 12 rounds across the continent. Future Formula One world champion, Alain Prost took overall victory in five of these rounds which, among other results, made him the drivers champion for 1979, with Michael Bleekemolen finishing in second and Slim Borgudd third.

== Calendar ==
| Round | Circuit | Date |
|---|---|---|
| 1 | (Italy) ACI Vallelunga Circuit, Campagnano di Roma | 18 March |
| 2 | (Austria) Österreichring, Spielberg | 15 April |
| 3 | (Belgium) Circuit Zolder, Heusden-Zolder | 22 April |
| 4 | (France) Circuit de Nevers Magny-Cours, Magny-Cours | 1 May |
| 5 | (United Kingdom) Donington Park, Leicestershire | 20 May |
| 6 | (Netherlands) Circuit Park Zandvoort, Zandvoort | 4 June |
| 7 | (Italy) Autodromo di Pergusa, Pergusa | 17 June |
| 8 | (Italy) Autodromo Nazionale Monza, Monza | 24 June |
| 9 | (Sweden) Ring Knutstorp, Kågeröd | 5 August |
| 10 | (Sweden) Kinnekulle Ring, Kinnekulle | 12 August |
| 11 | (Spain) Circuito del Jarama, Madrid | 9 September |
| 12 | (West Germany) Kassel-Calden Circuit, Kassel | 7 October |

== Results ==
| Round | Circuit | Pole position | Fastest lap | Winning driver | Winning team | Report |
|---|---|---|---|---|---|---|
| 1 | (Italy) ACI Vallelunga Circuit | (Italy) Michele Alboreto | (Italy) Piercarlo Ghinzani | (Italy) Piercarlo Ghinzani | Euroracing | Report |
| 2 | (Austria) Österreichring, Spielberg | (France) Alain Prost | (France) Alain Prost | (France) Alain Prost | Ecurie Elf | Report |
| 3 | (Belgium) Circuit Zolder | (France) Alain Prost | (Italy) Michele Alboreto | (France) Alain Prost | Ecurie Elf | Report |
| 4 | (France) Circuit de Nevers Magny-Cours | (Italy) Michele Alboreto | (France) Alain Prost | (France) Alain Prost | Ecurie Elf | Report |
| 5 | (United Kingdom) Donington Park | (Italy) Andrea de Cesaris | (Brazil) Chico Serra | (New Zealand) Brett Riley | Unipart Team | Report |
| 6 | (Netherlands) Circuit Park Zandvoort | (Sweden) Slim Borgudd | (France) Alain Prost | (France) Alain Prost | Ecurie Elf | Report |
| 7 | (Italy) Autodromo di Pergusa | (Italy) Piero Necchi | (Netherlands) Michael Bleekemolen | (Italy) Piercarlo Ghinzani | Euroracing | Report |
| 8 | (Italy) Autodromo Nazionale Monza | (Italy) Mauro Baldi | (New Zealand) Mike Thackwell | (New Zealand) Mike Thackwell | March Engineering | Report |
| 9 | (Sweden) Ring Knutstorp | (France) Alain Prost | (France) Alain Prost | (France) Alain Prost | Ecurie Elf | Report |
| 10 | (Sweden) Kinnekulle Ring | (France) Alain Prost | (France) Alain Prost | (France) Richard Dallest | Ecurie Elf | Report |
| 11 | (Spain) Circuito del Jarama | (France) Alain Prost | (France) Alain Prost | (France) Alain Prost | Ecurie Elf | Report |
| 12 | (West Germany) Kassel-Calden Circuit | (Sweden) Slim Borgudd | (West Germany) Helmut Henzler | (West Germany) Michael Korten | Klaus Zimmermann Racing | Report |

== Championship standings ==
=== Drivers' championship ===
| Place | Driver | Car - Engine | Total |
|---|---|---|---|
| 1 | (France) Alain Prost | Martini-Renault MK27 | 67 |
| 2 | (Netherlands) Michael Bleekemolen | Ralt- Toyota RT1; March-Toyota 793 | 28 |
| 3 | (Sweden) Slim Borgudd | Ralt-Toyota RT1 | 23 |
| 4 | (Italy) Mauro Baldi | March-Toyota 793 | 22 |
| 5 | (France) Richard Dallest | Martini-Toyota MK27 | 21 |
| 6 | (Italy) Michele Alboreto | March-Toyota 793; March-Alfa Romeo 793 | 19 |
| 7 | (West Germany) Michael Korten | March-Toyota 793 | 14 |
| 8= | (New Zealand) Mike Thackwell | March-Toyota 793 | 9 |
| | (New Zealand) Brett Riley | March-Triumph 783/793 | |
| 10= | (Italy) Daniele Albertin | Ralt-Toyota RT1 | 8 |
| | (France) Serge Saulnier | Martini-Toyota MK27 | |
| 12 | (Italy) Carlo Rossi | Ralt-Toyota RT1 | 7 |
| 13= | (Netherlands) Arie Luyendijk | Argo-Toyota JM3 | 6 |
| | (Brazil) Chico Serra | March-Toyota 793 | |
| | (Sweden) Anders Olofsson | Ralt-Toyota RT1 | |
| | (France) Philippe Streiff | Martini-Renault MK21/27 | |
| | (Belgium) Thierry Boutsen | Ralt-Toyota RT1; March-Toyota 793 | |
| 18 | (Italy) Robeto Campominosi | Ralt-Toyota RT1/RT3 | 5 |
| 19= | (West Germany) Hans-Georg Bürger | Ralt-Toyota RT1 | 4 |
| | (West Germany) Helmut Henzler | March-Volkswagen 793 | |
| 21= | (Republic of Ireland) Michael Roe | Chevron-Toyota B47 | 3 |
| | (Austria) Jo Gartner | Martini-Renault MK27 | |
| | (Italy) Guido Pardini | Dallara-Toyota WD1 | |
| | (Italy) Oscar Pedersoli | March-Toyota 783 | |
| 25= | (Colombia) Roberto Guerrero | Argo-Toyota JM3 | 2 |
| | (Sweden) Jan Ridell | Ralt-Toyota RT1 | |
| | (Switzerland) Jürg Lienhard | March-Toyota 793 | |
| 28= | (Italy) Guido Daccò | March-Toyota 783 | 1 |
| | (Spain) Jorge Caton | Ralt-Toyota RT1 | |
| | (West Germany) Ernst Maring | March-Toyota 793 | |
