= 1975 FIA European Formula 3 Cup =

Open-wheel motor race series

Seasons
- ← none 1976 →

The 1975 FIA European Formula 3 Cup was the first edition of the FIA European Formula 3 Championship. The championship consisted of six rounds across the continent. The season was won by Australian Larry Perkins, with Conny Andersson second and Renzo Zorzi in third.

== Calendar ==
Round	Circuit	Date
1	Circuit de Monaco, Monte-Carlo	10 May
2	(Germany) Nürburgring, Nürburg	31 May
3	(Sweden) Scandinavian Raceway, Anderstorp	8 June
4	(Italy) Autodromo Nazionale Monza, Monza	29 June
5	(France) Circuit de Croix-en-Ternois, Croix-en-Ternois	20 July
6	(Denmark) Ring Djursland, Pederstrup	3 August

== Results ==
Round	Circuit	Pole position	Fastest lap	Winning driver	Winning team	Report
1	Circuit de Monaco	(Australia) Larry Perkins	(United Kingdom) Tony Brise	(Italy) Renzo Zorzi	Scuderia Mirabella Mille Miglia	Report
2	(Germany) Nürburgring	(Sweden) Conny Andersson	(Sweden) Freddy Kottulinsky	(Sweden) Freddy Kottulinsky	Fritz Lochmann Racing	Report
3	(Sweden) Scandinavian Raceway	(Brazil) Alex Ribeiro	(Sweden) Conny Ljungfeldt	(Sweden) Conny Andersson	Rotel Racing Team	Report
4	(Italy) Autodromo Nazionale Monza	(Brazil) Alex Ribeiro	(Australia) Larry Perkins	(Australia) Larry Perkins	Team Cowangie	
5	(France) Circuit de Croix-en-Ternois	(Belgium) Patrick Nève	(Belgium) Patrick Nève	(Australia) Larry Perkins	Team Cowangie	Report
6	(Denmark) Ring Djursland	(Australia) Larry Perkins	Not available	(Australia) Terry Perkins	Team Cowangie	

== Championship standings ==
=== Drivers' championship ===
Place	Driver	Car - Engine	Total
1	(Australia) Larry Perkins	Ralt RT1-Ford	18
2	(Sweden) Conny Andersson	March 753-Toyota	14
3	(Italy) Renzo Zorzi	GRD 374-Lancia	11
4	(Sweden) Freddy Kottulinsky	Modus M1-BMW	9
=	(Australia) Terry Perkins	Ralt RT1-Ford	9
=	(Belgium) Patrick Nève	Safir RJ03-Ford	9
=	(Sweden) Ulf Svensson	Brabham BT41-Ford	9
8	(Italy) Alessandro Pesenti-Rossi	March 743-Ford	8
9	(Sweden) Gunnar Nordström	Modus M1-Toyota	7
10	(Germany) Dieter Kern	Alpine A364-Ford	6
=	(Sweden) Conny Ljungfeldt	March 743-Toyota	6
=	(Italy) Gaudenzio Mantova	March 753-Toyota	6
=	(Italy) Gianfranco Brancatelli	March 753-Toyota	6
=	(Italy) Fernando Spreafico	GRD 373-Ford	6
=	(Sweden) Anders Olofsson	GRD 373-Ford	6
16	(Sweden) Clas Sigurdsson	Brabham BT41-Toyota	4
17	(Italy) Giorgio Francia	Maco 375-Toyota	3
=	(United Kingdom) Stephen South	Ray 75-Toyota	3
=	(Denmark) Henrik Spellerberg	GRD 374-Toyota	3
20	(Germany) Ernst Maring	Maco 375-Toyota	2
=	(Italy) Luciano Pavesi	Brabham BT41-Toyota	2
=	(Italy) Piercarlo Ghinzani	CRS 001-Toyota	2
23	(Brazil) Ingo Hoffmann	March 753-Toyota	1
