= Circuit de la Châtre =

Circuit, La Châtre, France

- Location: La Châtre, Indre, France
- Coordinates: 46°35′34.46″N 2°0′24.29″E
- Opened: 17 June 1956; 69 years ago
- Major events: European F3 (1980–1984); French F3 (1971–1973, 1979–1983, 1985–1988); French Formula Renault (1971–1972, 1975, 1978–1983)

Grand Prix Circuit (1978–1995, 2001–present)
- Length: 2.325 km (1.445 mi)
- Turns: 14
- Race lap record: 1:03.333 ( (France) Alain Ferté, Martini MK37, 1982, F3)

School Circuit (1978–present)
- Length: 1.267 km (0.787 mi)
- Turns: 9

Original Circuit (1956–1977)
- Length: 1.266 km (0.787 mi)
- Turns: 4
- Race lap record: 0:34.700 ( (France) Jean-Pierre Jabouille, Lola T290, 1973, S2000)

Circuit de la Châtre is a 2.325 km (1.445 mi) circuit located in La Châtre, Indre, France.

The circuit was opened in June 1956 as a street circuit, and it was extended from 1.266 to 2.325 km (0.787 to 1.445 mi) in 1976. After its extension, the circuit has both characteristics of permanent circuits and street circuits. Besides national championships, the circuit also hosted FIA European Formula 3 Championship from 1980 to 1984.

== Lap records ==
As of May 1984, the fastest official race lap records at the Circuit de la Châtre are listed as:

Category	Time	Driver	Vehicle	Event
Grand Prix Circuit (1978–1995, 2001–present): 2.325 km (1.445 mi)
Formula Three	1:03.333	Alain Ferté	Martini MK37	1982 La Châtre European F3 round
Formula Renault 2.0	1:03.980	Joël de Miguel	Martini MK26	1980 La Châtre French Formula Renault round
Group 6	1:07.310	Dominique Lacaud	Lola T600	1984 La Châtre French Group 6 Championship round
Original Circuit (1956–1977): 1.266 km (0.787 mi)
Sports 2000	0:34.700	Jean-Pierre Jabouille	Lola T290	1973 La Châtre Championnat de France des Circuits round
Formula Three	0:35.700	Tony Brise	Brabham BT38C	1972 La Châtre French F3 round
Formula Renault 2.0	0:37.500	Jacques Laffite	Martini MK8	1972 La Châtre French Formula Renault round
