= FIA European Formula 3 Championship (1975–1984) =

Former single-seater racing championship

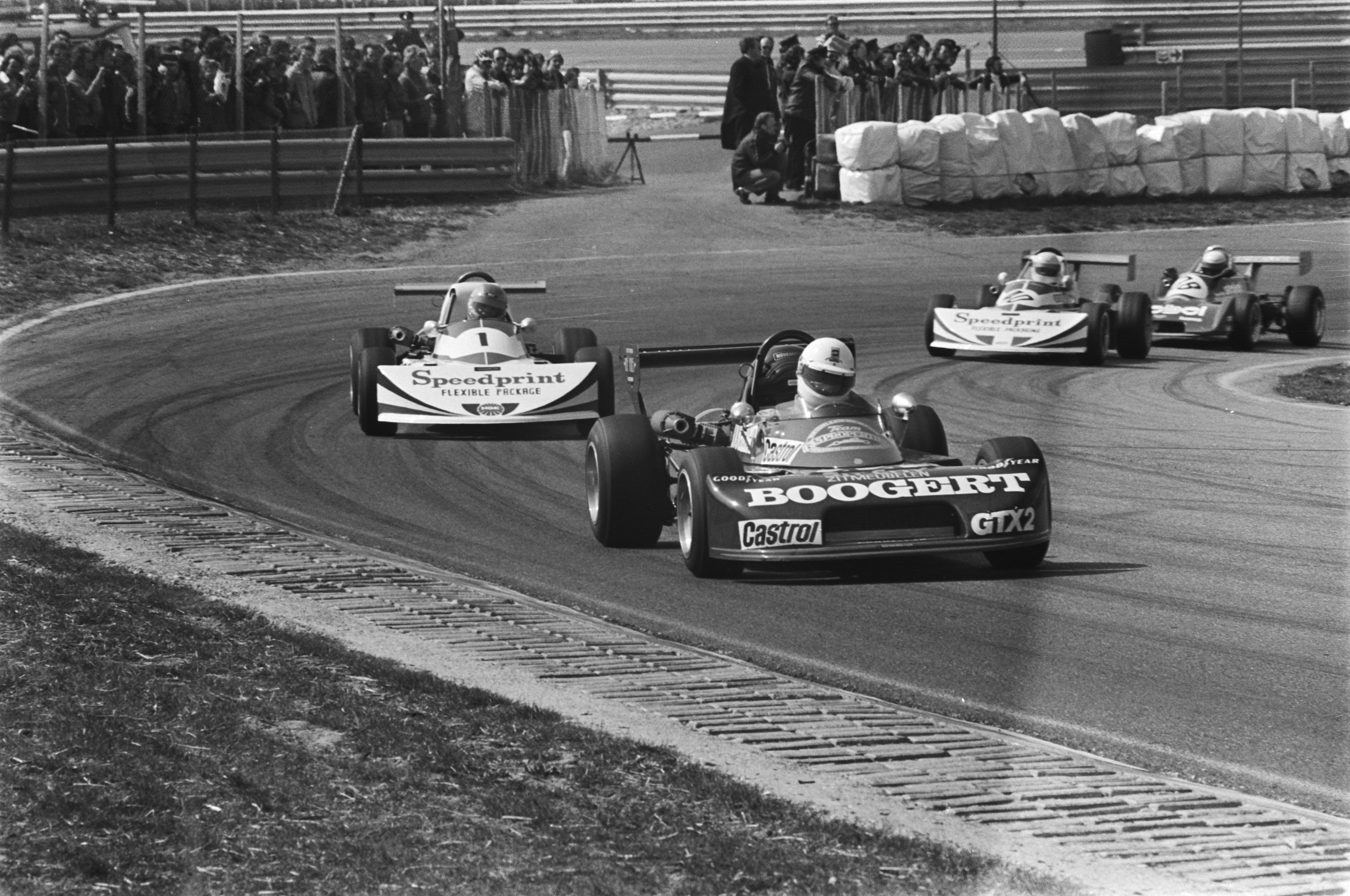
- European F3 in Zandvoort 1976
- Category: Single seater racing
- Country: Europe
- Inaugural season: 1975
- Folded: 1984

FIA European Formula 3 Championship was a former European Formula Three racing competition, organised by the FIA.

The series started in 1966 as a one-race event for national teams, named the Formula 3 Nations European Cup. In 1975, with the introduction of a new regulation for 2000 cc cars, the series was expanded into a proper championship. It was cancelled in 1984, and it was replaced by the European Formula Three Cup the next year, returning to a one-event format.

In 1987, the EFDA started a new pan-European championship, named F3 Euroseries, but it ran for a single season. A proper continental series, re-using the Formula 3 Euro Series name, started in 2003, from the merger of the German and French championships.

== Champions ==
Season	Champion	Team
FIA European Formula 3 Cup
1975	(Australia) Larry Perkins	(Australia) Ralt Ford Team Cowangie
FIA European Formula 3 Championship
1976	(Italy) Riccardo Patrese	(Italy) Chevron P34 Ford Trivellato Racing
1977	(Italy) Piercarlo Ghinzani	(Italy) March Toyota AFMP Euroracing
1978	(Netherlands) Jan Lammers	(Netherlands) Ralt Toyota Racing Team Holland
1979	(France) Alain Prost	(France) Martini Renault Oreca
1980	(Italy) Michele Alboreto	(Italy) Alfa Romeo Euroracing
1981	(Italy) Mauro Baldi	(Italy) Alfa Romeo Euroracing
1982	(Argentina) Oscar Larrauri	(Italy) Alfa Romeo Euroracing
1983	(Italy) Pierluigi Martini	(Italy) Alfa Romeo Pavesi Racing
1984	(Italy) Ivan Capelli	(Italy) Alfa Romeo Enzo Coloni Racing

Table with all the F3 Drivers that competed in the FIA European Formula 3 Championship (1975–1984):

(It does not include entries when the driver was entered in a race, but he did not appear at the event).

DRIVER	COUNTRY	TITLE	ENTRIES	STARTS	1	2	3	4	5	6	FAST LAP
Adrian Campos	ESP		23	21	0	0	0	1	1	0	0
Åke Jansson	SWE		4	2	0	0	0	0	0	0	0
Alain Abdel	FRA		3	3	0	0	0	0	0	0	0
Alain Fell	FRA		3	1	0	0	0	0	0	0	0
Alain Ferté	FRA		31	31	2	10	7	1	3	2	6
Alain Hubert	FRA		3	3	0	0	0	0	0	0	0
Alain Prost	FRA	1979	16	16	7	1	1	0	0	1	7
Alan Smith	GBR		9	9	0	0	0	0	0	0	0
Albert Coll	FRA		2	1	0	0	0	0	0	0	0
Alceste Bodini	ITA		1	1	0	0	0	0	0	0	0
Alessandro Pesenti-Rossi	ITA		6	6	0	0	2	0	0	0	1
Alessandro Santin	ITA		3	3	0	0	0	0	0	0	0
Alex Caffi	ITA		1	0	0	0	0	0	0	0	0
Alex Ribeiro	BRA		3	3	0	0	0	0	0	0	0
Alexandre Neefs	BEL		1	1	0	0	0	0	0	0	0
Alexandre Yvon	FRA		1	0	0	0	0	0	0	0	0
Alfonso de Vinuesa	ESP		1	1	0	0	0	0	0	0	0
Alfonso Toledano	MEX		2	2	0	0	0	0	0	0	0
Alfredo Merelli	ITA		1	1	0	0	0	0	0	0	0
Alfredo Ruggeri	ITA		3	3	0	0	0	0	0	0	0
Alfredo Sebastiani	ITA		4	4	0	0	0	0	0	1	0
Allen Berg	CAN		3	2	0	0	0	0	0	0	0
Almo Coppelli	ITA		2	2	0	0	0	0	0	0	0
Anders Olofsson	SWE		36	36	7	6	4	3	2	1	6
Anders Tenor	SWE		2	2	0	0	0	0	0	0	0
Andrea de Cesaris	ITA		3	3	0	0	0	1	0	0	0
Andrea Morell	SUI		1	1	0	0	0	0	0	0	0
Andrew Gilbert-Scott	GBR		2	1	0	0	0	0	0	0	0
Andy Wietzke	GER		2	2	0	0	0	0	0	0	0
Angelo Scifoni	ITA		1	1	0	0	0	0	0	0	0
Anna Cambiaghi	ITA		1	1	0	0	0	0	0	0	0
Antonino Giglio	ITA		1	0	0	0	0	0	0	0	0
Antonio Padrone	ITA		2	2	0	0	0	0	0	0	0
Antonio Rampinini	SUI		1	1	0	0	0	0	0	0	0
Arie Luyendyk	HOL		26	25	0	1	0	0	3	3	1
Armin Conrad	SUI		2	2	0	0	0	0	0	0	0
Artemio Rosich	ESP		5	5	0	0	0	0	0	0	0
Arturo Merzario	ITA		1	1	0	0	0	0	0	0	0
Aryon Cornelsen Filho	BRA		3	3	0	0	0	0	0	0	0
Asteldo	ITA		1	0	0	0	0	0	0	0	0
Augusto Avanzini	ITA		5	5	0	0	0	0	0	0	0
Ayrton Senna	BRA		1	1	0	0	0	0	0	0	0
Bartl Stadler	AUT		2	2	0	0	0	0	0	0	0
Beat Blatter	SUI		3	3	0	0	0	0	0	0	0
Bengt Tragardh	SWE		3	3	0	0	0	0	0	0	0
Bengt Trägårdh	SWE		3	3	0	0	0	0	0	1	0
Beppe Gabbiani	ITA		11	11	1	2	1	0	0	1	0
Bernard Birbes	FRA		2	2	0	0	0	0	0	0	0
Bernard Birbès	FRA		1	0	0	0	0	0	0	0	0
Bernard Devaney	IRL		1	1	0	0	0	0	0	0	0
Bernard Leisi	SUI		1	0	0	0	0	0	0	0	0
Bernard Perroy	FRA		2	2	0	0	0	0	0	0	0
Bernard Santal	SUI		23	21	0	0	1	4	1	0	0
Bernd Breil	GER		2	0	0	0	0	0	0	0	0
Bernd Heuer	GER		1	1	0	0	0	0	0	0	0
Bernd Wicks	GER		4	4	0	0	0	0	0	0	0
Bernhard Brack	GER		1	1	0	0	0	0	0	0	0
Bertram Schafer	GER		28	27	0	2	1	1	3	0	0
Bjorn Ohlsson	SWE		1	1	0	0	0	0	0	0	0
Bo Martinsson	SWE		1	1	0	0	0	0	0	0	0
Bob Arnott	GBR		3	3	0	0	0	0	0	0	0
Bob Birrell	GBR		2	1	0	0	0	0	0	0	0
Bobby Rahal	USA		4	4	0	0	1	0	0	1	0
Bonde Hallenmark	SWE		3	3	0	0	0	0	0	0	0
Bosse Hagberg	SWE		3	3	0	0	0	0	0	0	0
Boy Hayje	HOL		3	3	0	0	1	0	0	0	0
Branco Halik	IUG		1	0	0	0	0	0	0	0	0
Brett Riley	NZE		4	4	2	0	0	0	0	0	0
Bruce West	GBR		1	1	0	0	0	0	0	0	0
Bruno Corradi	ITA		3	3	0	0	0	0	0	0	0
Bruno di Gioia	FRA		4	1	0	0	0	0	0	0	0
Bruno Eggel	SUI		1	1	0	0	0	0	0	0	0
Bruno Eichmann	SUI		11	11	0	0	0	0	0	0	0
Bruno Giacomelli	ITA		1	1	0	0	0	0	0	0	0
Bruno Houzelot	FRA		1	1	0	0	0	0	0	0	0
Bruno Huber	SUI		4	4	0	0	0	0	0	0	0
Bruno Pescia	SUI		4	4	0	0	0	0	1	1	0
Calle Jonsson	SWE		2	2	0	0	0	0	0	0	0
Calvin Fish	GBR		1	1	0	0	0	0	0	0	0
Carlo Alberto	ARG		1	1	0	0	0	0	0	0	0
Carlo Betti	ITA		1	1	0	0	0	0	0	0	0
Carlo Matarazzo	ITA		2	2	0	0	0	0	0	0	0
Carlo Rossi	ITA		4	4	0	0	0	1	1	0	0
Carlos Abella	ESP		8	8	0	0	0	0	2	2	0
Carlos Peñacoba	ESP		1	1	0	0	0	0	0	0	0
Carlton Tingling	JAM		1	1	0	0	0	0	0	0	0
Cathy Muller	FRA		29	29	0	0	0	1	0	4	0
Cesare Passoli	ITA		2	2	0	0	0	0	0	0	0
Chico Serra	BRA		1	1	0	1	0	0	0	0	1
Christer Eriksson	SWE		1	1	0	0	0	0	0	0	0
Christer Offason	SWE		1	1	0	0	0	0	0	0	0
Christian Debias	FRA		1	1	0	0	0	0	0	0	0
Christian Estrosi	FRA		4	4	0	0	0	0	0	0	0
Cipo	ITA		3	3	0	0	0	0	0	0	0
Clas Sigurdsson	SWE		18	18	0	0	2	1	0	0	0
Claude Cuicci	BEL		1	1	0	0	0	0	0	0	0
Claude Marcq	FRA		1	0	0	0	0	0	0	0	0
Claudio Antonioli	ITA		1	0	0	0	0	0	0	0	0
Claudio Langes	ITA		40	39	1	3	1	5	5	1	0
Claus Schinkel	MEX		1	1	0	0	0	0	0	0	0
Cliff Hansen	USA		1	1	0	0	0	0	0	0	0
Conny Andersson	SWE		14	14	5	2	1	1	2	0	3
Conny Ljungfeldt	SWE		6	6	0	1	0	0	0	0	1
Cor Euser	HOL		5	3	0	0	0	0	0	0	0
Corrado Fabi	ITA		14	14	2	3	2	1	1	1	5
Cosimo Lucchesi	ITA		14	12	0	0	0	0	0	0	0
Curt Norrman	SWE		1	1	0	0	0	0	0	0	0
Daimon Metrebian	MON		5	5	0	0	0	0	0	0	0
Dan Molin	SWE		1	1	0	0	0	0	0	0	0
Daniel Boine	FRA		1	0	0	0	0	0	0	0	0
Daniel Burger	SUI		1	0	0	0	0	0	0	0	0
Daniel Herregods	BEL		5	5	0	0	0	0	0	0	0
Daniel Hintzy	FRA		4	4	0	0	0	0	0	0	0
Daniel Koch	SUI		1	0	0	0	0	0	0	0	0
Daniele Albertin	ITA		40	40	0	0	2	2	4	3	1
Danilo Frassoni	ITA		1	1	0	0	0	0	0	0	0
Danny Sullivan	USA		2	2	0	0	0	0	0	0	0
Dany Snobeck	FRA		2	2	0	0	0	0	0	0	0
Dave Scott	GBR		3	3	0	0	0	0	0	0	0
David Hunt	GBR		3	2	0	0	0	0	1	0	0
David Kennedy	IRL		19	19	0	2	2	2	2	0	2
David Leslie	GBR		2	2	0	0	0	0	0	0	0
David Sears	GBR		1	1	0	0	0	0	0	0	0
Davide Pavia	ITA		1	1	0	0	0	0	0	0	0
Davy Jones	USA		11	10	0	0	0	0	0	0	0
Denis Morin	FRA		13	12	0	0	0	1	1	0	0
Denis Oliveira	FRA		1	1	0	0	0	0	0	0	0
Derek Daly	IRL		4	4	1	0	1	0	0	0	0
Derek Warwick	GBR		5	5	1	0	1	0	0	1	0
Dick Berg	SWE		1	1	0	0	0	0	0	0	0
Didier Delente	FRA		1	0	0	0	0	0	0	0	0
Didier Theys	BEL		43	42	0	3	5	1	5	8	0
Dieter Heinzelmann	GER		1	1	0	0	0	0	0	0	0
Dieter Kern	GER		6	6	0	1	0	1	0	0	0
Dietmar Floer	GER		1	0	0	0	0	0	0	0	0
Dominique Tiercelin	FRA		3	3	0	0	0	0	0	0	0
Donald E. Bradway	GBR		3	3	0	0	0	0	0	0	0
Dragutin Ovcar	SWE		3	3	0	0	0	0	0	0	0
Dyfed Roberts	GBR		1	1	0	0	0	0	0	0	0
Eddie Jordan	IRL		1	1	0	0	0	0	1	0	0
Eddy Bianchi	ITA		10	10	0	0	0	2	1	0	1
Edy Kobelt	SUI		1	1	0	0	0	0	0	0	0
Egert Haglund	SWE		3	3	0	0	0	0	0	0	0
Eje Elgh	SWE		5	4	0	1	0	2	0	0	0
Elio de Angelis	ITA		9	9	1	0	0	3	0	0	5
Eliseo Salazar	CHL		1	1	0	0	0	0	0	0	0
Emanuele Pirro	ITA		45	44	6	7	4	4	3	3	4
Emilio Zapico	ESP		1	1	0	0	0	0	0	0	0
Enrico Bertaggia	ITA		1	0	0	0	0	0	0	0	0
Enrico Uncini	ITA		11	11	0	0	0	0	0	0	0
Enrique Benamo	ARG		9	8	0	0	1	0	0	0	0
Enrique Mansilla	ARG		1	1	0	0	1	0	0	0	0
Enzo Coloni	ITA		17	17	0	2	0	4	1	0	1
Erhard Miltz	GER		1	1	0	0	0	0	0	0	0
Eric Lang	USA		2	1	0	0	0	0	0	0	0
Eric Lukes	AUT		1	0	0	0	0	0	0	0	0
Eric Vuagnat	SUI		1	1	0	0	0	0	0	0	0
Erkki Salminen	SWE		7	7	0	0	0	0	0	0	0
Ernesto Catella	ITA		2	1	0	0	0	0	0	0	0
Ernesto Jochamowitz	PER		1	1	0	0	0	0	0	0	0
Ernst Franzmaier	AUT		2	2	0	0	0	0	0	0	0
Ernst Maring	GER		9	9	0	0	0	0	1	1	0
Erwin Derichs	GER		3	2	0	0	0	0	0	0	0
Fabio Mancini	ITA		9	8	0	0	0	0	0	1	0
Fabrizio Barbazza	ITA		1	1	0	0	0	0	1	0	0
Ferdinand de Lesseps	FRA		2	0	0	0	0	0	0	0	0
Ferdinando Romero	ITA		1	0	0	0	0	0	0	0	0
Fermin Velez	ESP		2	2	0	0	0	0	0	0	0
Fernando Cazzaniga	ITA		3	3	0	0	0	0	0	0	0
Fernando Jorge	BRA		10	10	0	0	0	0	0	0	0
Fernando Spreafico	ITA		11	11	0	1	0	0	0	2	0
Filippo Niccolini	ITA		6	6	0	0	0	1	1	0	0
Francesco Baldasseroni	ITA		1	1	0	0	0	0	0	0	0
Francesco Campaci	ITA		6	6	0	0	0	1	0	0	0
Franco Forini	SUI		8	8	0	0	1	1	0	0	1
Franco Scapini	ITA		7	6	0	0	0	0	0	0	0
François Hesnault	FRA		6	5	0	1	0	0	0	0	0
Frank Jelinski	GER		21	21	0	0	0	1	2	1	0
Franz Konrad	AUT		17	16	0	0	0	0	1	0	0
Fred Krab	HOL		4	4	0	0	0	0	0	0	0
Freddy Kottulinsky	SWE		2	2	1	0	0	0	0	0	1
Frédéric Delavallade	FRA		4	3	0	0	0	0	0	1	0
Fredy Eschenmoser	SUI		1	1	0	0	0	0	0	0	0
Fredy Schnarwiler	SUI		8	8	0	0	0	0	0	0	0
Fridolin Wettstein	SUI		7	7	0	0	0	0	0	0	0
Fritz Glatz	AUT		6	6	0	0	0	0	0	0	0
Fritz Stehlin	SUI		1	0	0	0	0	0	0	0	0
Fulvio Ballabio	ITA		5	5	0	0	0	0	0	0	0
Gabriele Tarquini	ITA		2	2	0	0	0	0	0	0	0
Gary Evans	GBR		1	1	0	0	0	0	0	1	0
Gaudenzio Mantova	ITA		7	6	0	1	0	1	0	0	0
Geir Tony Johansen	NOR		2	2	0	0	0	0	0	0	0
Geoff Brabham	AUS		3	3	0	0	0	0	1	0	0
Geoff Lees	GBR		2	2	0	0	1	0	0	1	0
Georg Bellof	GER		3	3	0	0	0	0	0	0	0
Georges Ansermoz	SUI		1	1	0	0	0	0	0	0	0
Gérard Dillmann	FRA		1	1	0	0	0	0	0	0	0
Gerhard Berger	AUT		26	25	2	3	5	3	0	2	2
Germain Garon	BEL		1	1	0	0	0	0	0	0	0
Gernot Lamby	GER		1	1	0	0	0	0	0	0	0
Gero Fleck	GER		4	4	0	0	0	0	0	0	0
Gero Zamagna	AUT		9	9	0	0	0	0	1	1	0
Giacomo Vismara	ITA		3	3	0	0	0	0	0	0	0
Giampiero Consonni	ITA		3	3	0	0	0	0	0	0	0
Giancarlo Comazzi	SUI		1	1	0	0	0	0	0	0	0
Gianfranco Brancatelli	ITA		13	13	2	2	0	3	1	1	2
Gianfranco Tacchino	ITA		3	2	0	0	0	0	0	0	0
Gianluca Bagnara	ITA		4	4	0	0	0	0	0	0	0
Gianluca Messini	ITA		7	7	0	0	0	0	0	0	0
Gianni Giudici	ITA		2	2	0	0	0	0	0	0	0
Gianni Savoia	ITA		3	3	0	0	0	0	0	0	0
Gilles Lempereur	FRA		2	1	0	0	0	0	0	0	0
Gimax	ITA		1	1	0	0	0	0	0	0	0
Giorgio Francia	ITA		2	2	0	0	0	1	0	0	0
Giorgio Montaldo	ITA		1	1	0	0	0	0	0	0	0
Giorgio Pirovano	ITA		1	1	0	0	0	0	0	0	0
Giovanna Amati	ITA		1	1	0	0	0	0	0	0	0
Giovanni Bertaccini	ITA		3	3	0	0	0	0	0	0	0
Giovanni Segalini	ITA		2	2	0	0	0	0	0	0	0
Giulio Regosa	ITA		1	1	0	0	0	0	0	0	0
Giuseppe Bossoni	ITA		5	5	0	0	0	1	1	1	0
Graham Hamilton	GBR		3	2	0	0	0	0	0	0	0
Gregg Atkinson	GBR		1	0	0	0	0	0	0	0	0
Guido Cappellotto	ITA		15	14	0	0	0	1	1	2	0
Guido Daccò	ITA		15	15	0	0	0	0	0	0	0
Guido Pardini	ITA		19	19	0	1	0	1	0	1	0
Gunnar Nilsson	SWE		1	1	0	0	0	0	0	0	0
Gunnar Nordstrom	SWE		3	3	0	0	1	1	0	0	0
Gunter Gebhardt	GER		1	1	0	0	0	0	0	0	0
Gunter Hoher	AUT		2	0	0	0	0	0	0	0	0
Gunter Holker	GER		2	2	0	0	0	0	0	0	0
Gunter Kolmel	GER		6	5	0	0	0	0	0	0	0
Gunther Kobele	GER		1	0	0	0	0	0	0	0	0
Guy Léon-Dufour	FRA		2	2	0	0	0	0	0	0	0
Hakan Alriksson	SWE		11	11	0	0	0	1	0	2	0
Hakan Backman	SWE		1	1	0	0	0	0	0	0	0
Hakan Olausson	SWE		2	2	0	0	0	0	0	0	0
Hans Deffland	GER		1	0	0	0	0	0	0	0	0
Hans Edvinsson	SWE		1	1	0	0	0	0	0	0	0
Hans Kitsz	HOL		1	1	0	0	0	0	0	0	0
Hans Royer	AUT		1	1	0	0	0	0	0	0	0
Hans-Georg Burger	GER		6	6	0	0	1	0	0	0	0
Hans-Joachim Hosch	GER		1	1	0	0	0	0	0	0	0
Hanspeter Hess	SUI		2	2	0	0	0	0	0	0	0
Hans-Peter Kaufmann	SUI		3	3	0	0	0	0	0	0	0
Hans-Peter Pandur	GER		7	5	0	0	0	0	0	0	0
Harald Brutschin	GER		9	9	0	0	0	0	0	1	0
Harald Pust	AUT		1	0	0	0	0	0	0	0	0
Harri Kangas	FIN		4	3	0	0	0	0	0	0	0
Hasse Thaung	SWE		9	7	0	0	0	0	0	0	0
Heinrich Heintz	GER		3	3	0	0	0	0	0	0	0
Heinrich Wiese	GER		2	2	0	0	0	0	0	0	0
Heinz Beisler	GER		1	1	0	0	0	0	0	0	0
Heinz Gilges	GER		1	1	0	0	0	0	0	0	0
Heinz Lange	GER		2	2	0	0	0	0	0	0	0
Heinz Loosli	SUI		1	1	0	0	0	0	0	0	0
Heinz Schaltinat	GER		2	1	0	0	0	0	0	0	0
Heinz Scherle	GER		9	9	0	0	0	0	0	0	0
Helmut Bross	GER		10	10	0	0	0	0	0	0	0
Helmut Henzler	GER		8	8	0	0	0	1	0	1	2
Hendrik ten Cate	HOL		1	1	0	0	0	0	0	0	0
Henning Hagenbauer	GER		2	2	0	0	0	0	0	0	0
Henning Schmidt	GER		1	1	0	0	0	0	0	0	0
Henrik Spellerberg	DIN		12	11	0	0	0	2	0	2	0
Herbert Burgmayr	GER		3	3	0	0	0	0	0	0	0
Herbert Lingmann	GER		3	3	0	0	0	0	0	0	0
Hervé Delaunay	FRA		1	0	0	0	0	0	0	0	0
Hervé Leclerc	FRA		1	0	0	0	0	0	0	0	0
Hervé Regout	BEL		4	4	0	0	0	0	0	0	0
Hervé Roger	BEL		1	1	0	0	0	0	0	0	0
Horst Fritz	AUT		3	3	0	0	0	0	0	0	0
Hugues de Roover	FRA		1	1	0	0	0	0	0	0	0
Huub Rothengatter	HOL		21	21	0	0	0	0	3	1	0
Ian Flux	GBR		2	2	0	0	0	0	0	0	0
Ian Shaw	GBR		1	1	0	0	0	0	0	0	0
Ian Taylor	GBR		3	3	0	0	0	0	0	0	0
Ingo Hoffmann	BRA		2	2	0	0	0	0	0	1	0
Ingvar Carlsson	SWE		4	4	0	0	0	0	0	0	0
Ivan Capelli	ITA	1984	19	18	4	2	4	0	0	1	4
Ivone Pinton	ITA		1	1	0	0	0	0	0	0	0
Jac Nellemann	DIN		13	13	0	1	0	1	0	1	0
Jacques Coulon	FRA		9	9	0	0	0	1	0	0	0
Jacques Gambier	FRA		1	0	0	0	0	0	0	0	0
Jacques Sourié	FRA		3	0	0	0	0	0	0	0	0
Jakob Bordoli	SUI		23	21	0	0	0	0	0	0	0
James King	USA		2	2	0	0	0	0	0	0	0
James Weaver	GBR		9	9	3	1	1	1	0	0	2
Jan Hedström	SWE		2	2	0	0	0	0	0	0	0
Jan Lammers	HOL	1978	28	28	4	5	0	0	2	2	4
Jan Ridell	SWE		5	5	0	0	0	0	1	0	0
Jan Swedenborg	SWE		1	1	0	0	0	0	0	0	0
Jan Thoelke	GER		5	4	0	0	0	0	0	0	0
Jan-Anders Carlsson	SWE		3	2	0	0	0	0	0	0	0
Janito Campos	ARG		4	4	0	0	0	0	0	0	0
Jan-Olov Tingdahl	SWE		3	3	0	0	0	0	0	0	0
Jean Guergnon	FRA		1	0	0	0	0	0	0	0	0
Jean-Jacques Witz	SUI		3	3	0	0	0	0	0	0	0
Jean-Louis Bousquet	FRA		1	1	0	0	0	0	0	0	0
Jean-Louis Schlesser	FRA		28	28	0	0	1	4	2	2	1
Jean-Michel Hyvernat	FRA		1	0	0	0	0	0	0	0	0
Jean-Michel Neyrial	FRA		3	3	0	0	0	0	0	1	0
Jean-Noel Lanctuit	FRA		1	0	0	0	0	0	0	0	0
Jean-Pierre Alamy	CAN		1	1	0	0	0	0	0	0	0
Jean-Pierre Hoursourigaray	FRA		1	1	0	0	0	0	0	0	0
Jean-Pierre Lebet	SUI		3	2	0	0	0	0	0	0	0
Jean-Pierre Lorriaux	FRA		1	1	0	0	0	0	0	0	0
Jean-Pierre Malcher	FRA		1	1	0	0	0	0	0	0	0
Jean-Pierre Rouget	FRA		1	0	0	0	0	0	0	0	0
Jean-Pierre Trachsel	SUI		2	2	0	0	0	0	0	0	0
Jeff Ward	USA		1	0	0	0	0	0	0	0	0
Jerry Blaine	GBR		1	0	0	0	0	0	0	0	0
Jim Crawford	GBR		4	4	0	0	0	0	0	0	0
Jo Gartner	AUT		6	6	0	0	0	1	0	0	0
Jo Zeller	SUI		56	53	0	1	0	0	0	0	1
Joakim Lindström	SWE		1	1	0	0	0	0	0	0	0
Jochen Dauer	GER		8	8	0	0	0	1	1	0	0
Joel de Miguel	FRA		1	0	0	0	0	0	0	0	0
Johan Rajamaki	SWE		1	1	0	0	0	0	0	0	0
Johann Reindl	AUT		1	1	0	0	0	0	0	0	0
John Bosch	HOL		10	9	0	0	0	0	1	0	0
John Bright	GBR		2	2	0	0	0	0	0	0	0
John Nielsen	DIN		50	49	6	5	5	5	2	2	9
John Rust	GBR		1	1	0	0	0	0	0	0	0
John Stokes	GBR		1	1	0	0	0	0	0	0	0
John Village	GBR		1	1	0	0	0	0	0	0	0
John Vos	HOL		1	1	0	0	0	0	0	0	0
Johnny Dumfries	GBR		12	12	4	2	0	2	0	0	3
Johnny Sigfridsson	SWE		2	2	0	0	0	0	0	0	0
Jon Beekhuis	CAN		1	1	0	0	0	0	0	0	0
Jon Warmland	SWE		2	1	0	0	0	0	0	0	0
Jonathan Palmer	GBR		1	1	0	0	1	0	0	0	0
Jorg Reto	SUI		1	1	0	0	0	0	0	0	0
Jorge Caton	ESP		6	6	0	0	0	0	0	2	0
Jorge Koechlin	PER		1	1	0	0	0	0	0	0	0
Jorgen Orsum	DIN		2	2	0	0	0	0	0	0	0
Jorma Airaksinen	FIN		1	0	0	0	0	0	0	0	0
Jose Luis Llobell	ESP		13	12	0	0	0	0	0	0	0
Josef Kaufmann	GER		3	3	0	0	0	0	0	0	0
Josef Kremer	GER		2	2	0	0	0	0	0	0	0
Joseph Sulentic	USA		1	1	0	0	0	0	0	0	0
Juan Ignacio Villacieros	ESP		3	3	0	0	0	0	0	0	0
Juan Manuel Fangio II	ARG		2	2	0	0	0	0	0	0	0
Juan Serda	ESP		1	0	0	0	0	0	0	0	0
Jurg Lienhard	SUI		7	7	0	0	0	0	1	0	0
Jürg Lienhard	SUI		2	2	0	0	0	0	0	0	0
Jurgen Schlich	GER		5	5	0	0	0	0	0	0	0
Kaal Wirgin	SWE		4	4	0	0	0	0	0	0	0
Karl Hasenbichler	AUT		1	1	0	0	0	0	0	0	0
Karl Schuchnig	AUT		2	2	0	0	0	0	0	0	0
Karl-Christian Luck	GER		1	1	0	0	0	0	0	0	0
Karl-Heinz Wieschalla	GER		1	1	0	0	0	0	0	0	0
Kees Nierop	CAN		2	2	0	0	0	0	0	0	0
Ken Silverstone	GBR		3	3	0	0	0	0	0	0	0
Kennerth Persson	SWE		1	1	0	0	0	0	0	0	0
Kenneth Jonsson	SWE		1	1	0	0	0	0	0	0	0
Kenny Acheson	GBR		1	1	0	0	0	0	0	0	0
Kim Dupont	DIN		1	0	0	0	0	0	0	0	0
Konrad Heberer	GER		1	1	0	0	0	0	0	0	0
Kris Nissen	DIN		21	19	0	0	0	3	3	2	1
Kurt Thiim	DIN		31	30	0	1	3	2	3	3	1
Lamberto Leoni	ITA		9	9	0	0	0	0	1	0	0
Lammy van den Heuvel	HOL		1	1	0	0	0	0	0	0	0
Larry Perkins	AUS	1975	4	4	2	0	0	0	0	0	1
Lars Schneider	SWE		4	3	0	0	0	0	0	0	0
Lars Svensson	SWE		6	6	0	0	0	0	0	0	0
Lars-Ake Olsson	SWE		1	0	0	0	0	0	0	0	0
Lars-Viggo Jensen	DIN		2	2	0	0	0	0	0	0	0
Lasse Karlsson	SWE		3	3	0	0	0	0	0	0	0
Laurent Ferrier	SUI		1	1	0	0	0	0	0	0	0
Leo Andersson	SWE		7	7	0	0	0	0	1	0	0
Leo Bartoli	ITA		1	1	0	0	0	0	0	0	0
Leonardo Verrelli	ITA		3	3	0	0	0	0	0	0	0
Loris Kessel	SUI		1	1	0	0	0	0	0	0	0
Louis Maulini	SUI		2	2	0	0	0	0	0	0	0
Luca Melgrati	ITA		1	1	0	0	0	0	0	0	0
Luca Onori	ITA		3	3	0	0	0	0	0	0	0
Luciano Arnold	SUI		2	2	0	0	0	0	0	0	0
Luciano Pavesi	ITA		6	6	0	0	0	0	1	0	0
Ludwig	ITA		1	1	0	0	0	0	0	0	0
Luigi Giannini	ITA		4	4	0	0	0	0	1	0	0
Luigino Grassi	ITA		2	2	0	0	0	0	0	0	0
Luis Gonzales Canomanuel	ESP		3	3	0	0	0	0	0	0	0
Luis Perez-Sala	ESP		13	13	0	1	0	0	1	0	0
Luis Villamil	ESP		13	13	0	0	0	0	0	0	0
Magnus Haggstam	SWE		1	1	0	0	0	0	0	0	0
Manfred Hebben	GER		3	3	0	0	0	0	0	0	0
Manfred Leppke	GER		5	4	0	0	0	0	0	0	0
Manuel Valls	ESP		5	4	0	0	0	0	0	0	0
Marc Duez	BEL		2	2	0	0	0	0	0	0	0
Marc Sourd	FRA		3	3	0	0	0	0	0	0	0
Marc Surer	SUI		7	7	0	1	0	1	2	0	0
Marcel Wettstein	SUI		12	12	0	0	0	0	0	0	0
Marcello Rosei	ITA		7	7	0	0	1	0	0	1	0
Marco Apicella	ITA		2	2	0	0	0	0	0	0	0
Marco Brand	ITA		2	2	0	0	0	0	0	0	0
Marco Gatta	ITA		1	0	0	0	0	0	0	0	0
Marco Melito	ITA		1	1	0	0	0	0	0	0	0
Marco Micangeli	ITA		2	2	0	0	0	0	0	0	0
Marco Spinelli	ITA		4	4	0	0	0	0	0	0	0
Marian Kruzliak	TCH		3	3	0	0	0	0	0	0	0
Marino Mantovani	ITA		3	3	0	0	0	0	0	0	0
Mario Ferraris	BRA		1	1	0	0	0	0	0	0	0
Mario Hytten	SUI		3	2	0	0	0	0	0	0	0
Mario Pati	BRA		3	3	0	0	0	0	0	0	0
Markus Höttinger	AUT		1	1	0	0	0	0	0	0	0
Martin Brundle	GBR		3	3	2	0	0	0	0	0	0
Martin Wood	GBR		1	1	0	0	0	0	0	0	0
Marzio Romano	SUI		15	13	0	0	1	0	0	0	0
Massimo Fabiani	ITA		1	1	0	0	0	0	0	0	0
Massimo Perazza	ITA		2	2	0	0	0	0	0	0	0
Mats Karlsson	SWE		5	4	0	0	0	0	0	0	0
Mats Nygren	SWE		2	2	0	0	0	0	0	1	0
Mats Paninder	SWE		9	8	0	0	0	0	0	0	0
Maurizio Manfredi	ITA		1	1	0	0	0	0	0	0	0
Mauro Baldi	ITA	1981	41	40	11	5	4	2	4	2	10
Max Busslinger	SUI		7	7	0	0	0	0	0	1	0
Max Welti	SUI		1	1	0	0	0	0	0	0	0
Michael Bleekemolen	HOL		28	28	1	3	4	2	2	1	1
Michael Jensen	DIN		1	1	0	0	0	0	0	0	0
Michael Korten	GER		17	17	1	0	0	1	0	1	0
Michael Roe	IRL		1	1	0	0	0	1	0	0	0
Michel Ferté	FRA		7	7	0	0	1	0	1	0	0
Michel Lateste	FRA		2	1	0	0	0	0	0	0	0
Michele Alboreto	ITA	1980	20	20	4	2	4	3	1	0	2
Miguel Angel Guerra	ARG		1	1	0	0	0	0	0	0	0
Miguel Molons	ESP		1	1	0	0	0	0	0	0	0
Mikael Nabrink	SWE		6	6	0	0	0	0	0	0	0
Mike Blanchet	GBR		3	3	0	0	0	0	0	0	0
Mike Dixon	GBR		1	1	0	0	0	0	0	0	0
Mike O´Brien	GBR		3	3	0	0	0	0	0	0	0
Mike Thackwell	NZE		2	2	1	0	0	0	0	0	1
Mike White	RSA		3	3	2	0	0	0	0	1	1
Nelson Piquet	BRA		11	11	2	1	2	0	0	1	2
Nettan Lindgren	SWE		4	4	0	0	0	0	0	0	0
Nicky Nufer	GER		1	1	0	0	0	0	0	0	0
Nigel Mansell	GBR		1	1	0	0	0	0	0	0	0
Nils-Ake Carlborg	SWE		3	3	0	0	0	0	0	0	0
Nino Famà	ITA		1	1	0	0	0	0	0	0	0
Norbert Hutter	SUI		5	4	0	0	0	0	0	0	0
Olaf Hohn	GER		4	4	0	0	0	0	0	0	0
Olav Ronningen	NOR		3	3	0	0	0	0	0	0	0
Ole Vejlund	DIN		11	11	0	0	0	0	0	0	0
Olivier Grouillard	FRA		4	4	0	0	0	0	0	0	0
Orazio Ragaiolo	ITA		6	6	0	0	0	0	0	1	0
Osamu Nakako	JPN		1	1	0	0	0	0	0	0	0
Oscar Larrauri	ARG	1982	39	39	8	5	4	2	3	1	6
Oscar Pedersoli	ITA		28	27	2	1	0	0	0	1	2
Paolo Barilla	ITA		4	4	0	0	0	0	0	0	0
Paolo Bozzetto	ITA		11	11	0	0	0	0	0	0	0
Paolo Giangrossi	ITA		23	22	0	1	1	2	0	3	1
Paolo Munarini	ITA		4	4	0	0	0	0	0	0	0
Paolo Squillace	ITA		1	1	0	0	0	0	0	0	0
Par Olsson	SWE		2	2	0	0	0	0	0	0	0
Pascal Fabre	FRA		28	28	0	0	2	0	1	4	0
Pascal Pessiot	FRA		6	5	0	0	0	0	0	0	0
Pascal Witmeur	BEL		1	1	0	0	0	0	0	0	0
Pasquale Zullo	ITA		4	4	0	0	0	0	0	0	0
Patrick Bardinon	FRA		9	8	0	0	0	0	0	0	0
Patrick Gaillard	FRA		19	19	2	3	1	1	2	3	1
Patrick Gonin	FRA		7	6	0	0	0	0	0	0	0
Patrick Lancelot	FRA		4	4	0	0	0	0	0	0	0
Patrick Lecompte	FRA		2	0	0	0	0	0	0	0	0
Patrick Neve	BEL		3	2	0	1	0	1	0	0	1
Patrick Teillet	FRA		8	8	0	0	0	0	0	1	0
Paul Belmondo	FRA		2	2	0	0	0	0	0	0	0
Paul Bernasconi	AUS		1	1	0	0	0	0	0	0	0
Paul Hutson	GBR		3	3	0	0	0	0	0	0	0
Paul Jackson	GBR		1	1	0	0	0	0	0	0	0
Paul Radisich	NZE		1	1	0	0	0	0	0	0	0
Per Sundet	NOR		4	4	0	0	0	0	0	0	0
Pere Nogués	ESP		2	2	0	0	0	0	0	0	0
Peter Argetsinger	USA		1	1	0	0	0	0	0	0	0
Peter Bonk	GER		4	2	0	0	0	0	0	0	0
Peter Cornand	GER		4	4	0	0	0	0	0	0	0
Peter Katsarski	GER		3	2	0	0	0	0	0	0	0
Peter Kroeber	GER		8	8	0	0	0	0	0	0	0
Peter Scharmann	AUT		4	4	0	0	0	0	2	0	0
Peter Schindler	AUT		10	10	0	0	0	0	0	0	0
Peter Wicks	GER		1	1	0	0	0	0	0	0	0
Peter Wisskirchen	GER		14	14	0	0	0	0	0	0	0
Phil Kempe	GBR		1	1	0	0	0	0	0	0	0
Philip Daniels	BEL		1	1	0	0	0	0	0	0	0
Philipp Müller	SUI		7	7	0	0	0	0	0	0	0
Philippe Alliot	FRA		39	38	3	5	5	6	4	2	3
Philippe Colonna	FRA		9	8	0	0	0	0	0	0	0
Philippe Huart	FRA		6	6	0	0	0	0	0	0	0
Philippe Lambert	SUI		3	3	0	0	0	0	0	0	0
Philippe Paoli	FRA		1	0	0	0	0	0	0	0	0
Philippe Renault	FRA		1	1	0	0	0	0	0	0	0
Philippe Streiff	FRA		31	31	1	2	4	6	2	1	1
Piercarlo Ghinzani	ITA	1977	28	28	5	3	8	4	1	0	2
Piergiovanni Tenani	ITA		5	3	0	0	0	0	0	0	0
Pierluigi Martini	ITA	1983	20	19	4	3	1	2	1	0	5
Piero Necchi	ITA		15	15	0	3	2	0	0	2	0
Piero Vivarelli	ITA		1	1	0	0	0	0	0	0	0
Pierre Dieudonné	BEL		3	2	0	0	0	0	0	0	0
Pierre Petit	BEL		9	9	0	0	0	0	0	0	0
Pierre-Alain Lombardi	SUI		7	6	0	0	0	0	0	0	0
Pierre-Yves Meinen	SUI		1	1	0	0	0	0	0	0	0
Placido Iglesias	BRA		1	1	0	0	0	0	0	0	0
Placido-Daniel Pardo	GER		1	1	0	0	0	0	0	0	0
Quirin Bovy	BEL		10	10	0	0	0	0	0	0	0
Raul Boesel	BRA		1	1	0	0	0	1	0	0	0
Reima Soderman	FIN		3	1	0	0	0	0	0	0	0
Reinhard Pfandler	SUI		1	1	0	0	0	0	0	0	0
Renato Dotta	SUI		2	2	0	0	0	0	0	0	0
Renzo Zorzi	ITA		3	3	1	0	0	0	0	2	0
Ricardo Galiano Ramos	ESP		10	10	0	0	0	0	0	0	0
Riccardo Paletti	ITA		4	4	0	0	0	0	0	0	0
Riccardo Patrese	ITA	1976	9	9	4	2	2	0	0	0	3
Richard Dallest	FRA		10	10	1	0	1	0	1	3	0
Richard Hawkins	GBR		2	2	0	0	0	0	0	0	0
Richard Trott	GBR		2	2	0	0	0	0	0	0	0
Rob Leeuwenburg	HOL		3	3	0	0	0	0	0	0	0
Rob Wilson	NZE		2	2	0	1	0	0	0	0	0
Robert Simac	FRA		2	2	0	0	0	0	0	0	0
Roberto Campominosi	ITA		16	15	0	1	0	0	2	4	0
Roberto Farneti	ITA		10	9	0	0	0	0	0	1	0
Roberto Guerrero	COL		2	2	0	0	0	0	1	0	0
Roberto Manzoni	ITA		6	6	0	0	0	0	0	0	0
Roberto Marazzi	ITA		1	0	0	0	0	0	0	0	0
Roberto Moreno	BRA		2	2	1	0	0	1	0	0	0
Roberto Pravata	ESP		1	1	0	0	0	0	0	0	0
Roberto Ravaglia	ITA		30	30	1	1	3	1	3	4	1
Rodolfo Bellini	ITA		1	1	0	0	0	0	0	0	0
Roger Hurst	GBR		1	1	0	0	0	0	0	0	0
Roland Binder	GER		1	1	0	0	0	0	0	0	0
Roland Saier	GER		2	2	0	0	0	0	0	0	0
Rolf Egger	SUI		2	2	0	0	0	0	0	0	0
Ronnie Grant	GBR		2	1	0	0	0	0	0	0	0
Roy Steele	GBR		1	1	0	0	0	0	0	0	0
Rudi Niggemeier	GER		7	7	0	0	0	0	0	0	0
Rudolf Dotsch	GER		11	10	0	0	0	0	0	0	0
Rudolf Rohnert	GER		3	3	0	0	0	0	0	0	0
Rudolf Seher	GER		3	3	0	0	0	0	0	0	0
Ruedi Frei	SUI		1	1	0	0	0	0	0	0	0
Ruedi Gygax	SUI		6	6	0	0	0	0	0	0	0
Ruggero Gruet	SUI		6	5	0	0	0	0	0	0	0
Ruggero Melgrati	ITA		29	29	0	0	1	1	3	1	1
Rupert Keegan	GBR		5	4	0	0	0	0	1	0	0
Russell Spence	GBR		2	2	0	1	0	0	0	0	1
Sandro Cinotti	ITA		2	2	0	0	0	0	0	0	0
Serge Saulnier	FRA		4	4	0	1	0	0	1	0	0
Sergio Leone	ITA		6	6	0	0	0	0	0	0	0
Severino Nardozzi	ITA		1	0	0	0	0	0	0	0	0
Severo Zampatti	ITA		3	3	0	0	0	0	0	0	0
Sewi Hopfer	AUT		2	2	0	0	0	0	0	0	0
Shuroko Sasaki	JPN		1	1	0	0	0	0	1	0	0
Siegfried Stohr	ITA		5	5	0	0	0	0	1	0	1
Silvano Colciago	ITA		3	3	0	0	0	0	0	0	0
Slim Borgudd	SWE		30	30	0	1	2	3	1	2	0
Sonny Johansson	SWE		4	3	0	0	0	0	0	0	0
Søren Aggerholm	DIN		3	3	0	0	0	0	0	0	0
Soren-Poul Hansen	DIN		1	1	0	0	0	0	0	0	0
Stanley Dickens	SWE		1	1	0	0	0	0	0	0	0
Stefan Johansson	SWE		13	13	0	0	0	0	0	0	0
Stefan Oberndorfer	GER		1	1	0	0	0	0	0	0	0
Stefano Livio	ITA		4	4	0	0	0	0	0	0	0
Stefano Piccolomini	ITA		1	1	0	0	0	0	0	0	0
Stephen South	GBR		5	5	0	0	0	0	1	1	0
Steve Bradley	GBR		1	1	0	0	0	0	0	0	0
Steve Farnsworth	USA		1	1	0	0	0	0	0	0	0
Steven Andskär	SWE		1	1	0	0	0	0	0	0	0
Tarcisio Riva	SUI		2	2	0	0	0	0	0	0	0
Teo Fabi	ITA		15	15	3	1	3	0	0	0	3
Terry Gray	GBR		1	1	0	0	0	0	0	0	0
Terry Perkins	AUS		2	2	1	0	0	0	0	0	0
Thierry Boutsen	BEL		24	24	3	3	0	2	3	1	2
Thierry Heirman	BEL		1	0	0	0	0	0	0	0	0
Thierry Tassin	BEL		3	3	0	0	0	1	0	0	0
Thomas Bertschinger	GER		1	0	0	0	0	0	0	0	0
Thomas Danielsson	SWE		1	1	0	0	0	0	0	0	0
Thomas Holert	GER		4	4	0	0	0	0	0	0	0
Thomas Kloss	AUT		5	5	0	0	0	0	0	0	0
Thomas von Lowis of Menar	GER		11	11	0	0	0	0	0	0	0
Thorbjorn Carlsson	SWE		23	23	0	0	0	0	0	0	0
Thorkild Thyrring	DIN		8	8	0	0	1	0	1	0	0
Tiff Needell	GBR		3	3	0	0	0	0	0	0	0
Tim Lee-Davey	GBR		2	1	0	0	0	0	0	0	0
Tomas Kaiser	SWE		7	7	0	0	0	0	0	0	0
Tommie Weiss	SWE		1	1	0	0	0	0	0	0	0
Tommy Byrne	IRL		27	26	2	2	2	1	3	3	1
Tommy Grunnah	USA		1	1	0	0	0	0	0	0	0
Tony Brise	GBR		1	1	0	0	0	0	0	0	1
Tony Norton	GBR		3	3	0	0	0	0	0	0	0
Tony Trevor	GBR		4	4	0	0	0	0	0	0	0
Toshio Suzuki	JPN		4	4	0	0	0	1	0	0	0
Trevor Templeton	IRL		1	1	0	0	0	0	0	0	0
Trevor van Rooyen	RSA		1	1	0	0	0	0	0	0	0
Trevor Wigglesworth	GBR		2	2	0	0	0	0	0	0	0
Tryggve Grönvall	SWE		5	4	0	0	0	0	0	0	0
Ulf Granberg	SWE		1	1	0	0	0	0	0	0	0
Ulf Svensson	SWE		28	26	0	1	3	0	1	3	0
Urs Dudler	SUI		8	7	0	0	0	0	0	0	0
Uwe Teuscher	GER		2	2	0	0	0	0	0	0	0
Victor Rosso	ARG		1	1	0	0	0	0	0	0	0
Vinicio Salmi	ITA		5	5	0	0	0	0	0	1	0
Volker Weidler	GER		2	2	0	0	0	0	0	0	0
Walo Schibler	SUI		1	1	0	0	0	0	0	0	0
Walter Frey	SUI		1	1	0	0	0	0	0	0	0
Walter Lechner	AUT		18	17	0	0	0	0	0	0	0
Walter Schoch	AUT		2	1	0	0	0	0	0	0	0
Walter Spitaler	GER		4	4	0	0	0	0	0	0	0
Walter Voulaz	ITA		7	7	0	0	0	0	1	0	0
Werner Fischer	GER		4	4	0	0	0	0	0	0	0
Werner Klein	GER		5	5	0	0	0	0	0	0	0
Willi Siller	AUT		6	6	0	0	0	0	0	0	0
William Dawson	USA		2	2	0	0	0	0	0	0	0
Willy Weiss	GER		2	2	0	0	0	0	0	0	0
Wladimiro de Tommaso	ITA		1	1	0	0	0	0	0	0	0
Wolfgang Holy	AUT		5	5	0	0	0	0	0	0	0
Wolfgang Kaufmann	GER		1	1	0	0	0	0	0	0	0
Wolfgang Klein	GER		11	11	0	0	1	0	0	1	0
Wolfgang Locher	GER		6	5	0	0	0	0	0	0	0
Wyatt Stanley	GBR		5	5	0	0	0	0	0	0	0

== See also ==
- Formula Three
- FIA Formula 3 European Championship
- Formula 3 Euro Series
- FIA European Formula Three Cup
