= Croix-en-Ternois =

Croix-en-Ternois Croé-in-Térnoé (Picard)
- Commune
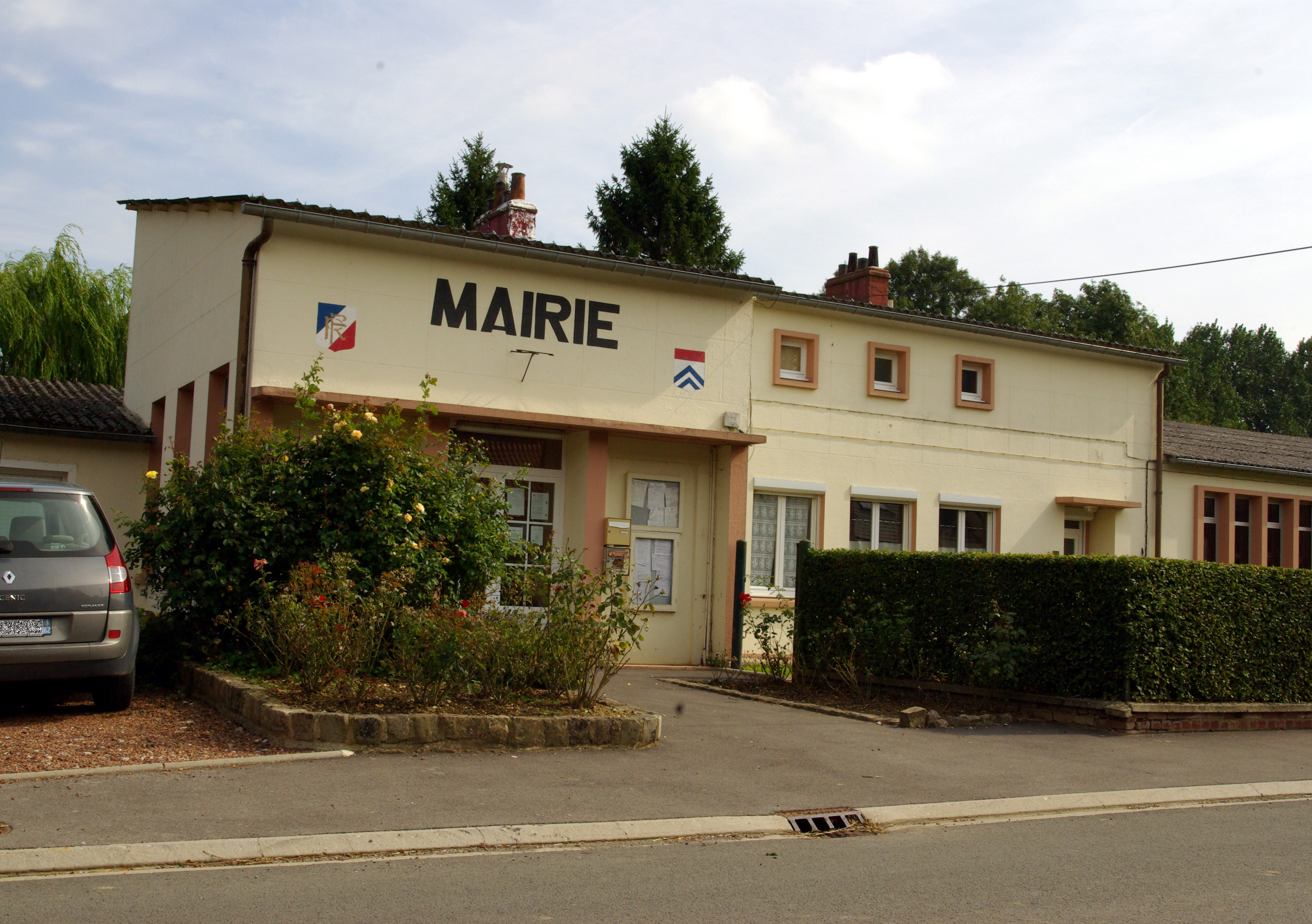
- The town hall of Croix-en-Ternois

- Coat of arms
- Location of Croix-en-Ternois
- Location within France Location within Hauts-de-France
- Coordinates: 50°23′02″N 2°16′57″E
- Country: France
- Region: Hauts-de-France
- Department: Pas-de-Calais
- Arrondissement: Arras
- Canton: Saint-Pol-sur-Ternoise
- Intercommunality: CC Ternois

Government
  - Mayor (2020–2026): Régis Béron
- Area^{1}: 6.62 km^{2} (2.56 sq mi)
- Elevation: 152 m (499 ft)
- Highest elevation: 151 m (495 ft)
- Lowest elevation: 99 m (325 ft)
- Population (2023): 333
  - Density: 50.3/km^{2} (130/sq mi)
- Time zone: UTC+01:00 (CET)
  - Summer (DST): UTC+02:00 (CEST)
- INSEE/Postal code: 62260 /62130
- ^{1} French Land Register data, which excludes lakes, ponds, glaciers > 1 km^{2} (0.386 sq mi or 247 acres) and river estuaries.

Croix-en-Ternois (Picard: Croé-in-Térnoé)is a commune in the Pas-de-Calais department in the Hauts-de-France region of France 45 kilometres (28 mi) west of Arras, about 60 kilometres (37.3 mi) south of Calais.

== Motorcycle race track ==
Croix-en-Ternois has a small motorcycle race track named Circuit de Croix-en-Ternois.

== Population ==
Historical population
Year	Pop.	±% p.a.
1968	208	—
1975	193	−1.06%
1982	196	+0.22%
1990	218	+1.34%
1999	255	+1.76%
2007	287	+1.49%
2012	318	+2.07%
2017	322	+0.25%
2023	333	+0.56%
Source: INSEE

== See also ==
- Communes of the Pas-de-Calais department
