= Automobiles Martini =

French car manufacturer

Martini
- Full name: Automobiles Martini
- Base: Magny-Cours, France
- Founder(s): Renato Martini, Bill Knight
- Noted drivers: (France) René Arnoux

Formula One World Championship career
- First entry: 1978 South African Grand Prix
- Races entered: 9 (4 starts)
- Engines: Ford Cosworth DFV V8
- Constructors' Championships: 0
- Drivers' Championships: 0
- Race victories: 0
- Podiums: 0
- Points: 0
- Pole positions: 0
- Fastest laps: 0
- Final entry: 1978 Dutch Grand Prix

Automobiles Martini is a constructor of Formula racing cars from France, founded by Renato "Tico" Martini in 1965, when Martini and partner Bill Knight founded the Winfield Racing School at the Magny-Cours circuit, in France. Martini's first car was the MW1 in 1967, a single seater for the racing driving school, from which was derived a Formula Three car, MW1A built in 1968.

Although the team enjoyed successful campaigns in Formula Three, winning French titles with Jacques Laffite (1976), René Arnoux (1977) and Patrick Tambay (1978), and in Formula Renault during the 1970s and 1980s, they are also known for having taken part in nine rounds of the 1978 Formula One season with the single MK23 chassis, giving René Arnoux (later a driver for Renault and Ferrari) his debut in Formula One.

Future four time World Drivers' Champion Alain Prost also used a Renault powered Martini to win the 1978 and 1979 French Formula Three Championship while driving for French team Oreca.

With Reynard, Ralt and Dallara crowding out the F3 market in the late 1980s, Martini reduced their customer program, keeping a stubborn presence in the French F3 championship during the 1990s, until Tico Martini sold the company to Guy Ligier in 2004.

== Complete Formula One results ==
(key) (results in bold indicate pole position)

Year	Entrant	Chassis	Engine	Drivers	No.	1	2	3	4	5	6	7	8	9	10	11	12	13	14	15	16	WDC	Points
1978	Automobiles Martini	MK23	Ford Cosworth DFV			ARG	BRA	RSA	USW	MON	BEL	ESP	SWE	FRA	GBR	GER	AUT	NED	ITA	USA	CAN	**NC**	**0**
1978	Automobiles Martini	MK23	Ford Cosworth DFV	(France) René Arnoux	31			DNQ		DNPQ	9	WD		14	WD	DNPQ	9	Ret				**NC**	**0**

== Major titles ==
- 21 French Formula Renault titles between 1975 and 1997, with drivers such as Alain Prost, Érik Comas, Olivier Panis or Stéphane Sarrazin
- 20 French hill climb championship titles between 1979 and 1999, including 10 titles with Marcel Tarrès and one title with Guy Fréquelin
- 10 French Formula Three championship titles between 1973 and 1999, with drivers such as Jacques Laffite, Alain Prost or Sébastien Bourdais
- 2 European Formula Two Championship titles, in 1975 with Jacques Laffite and 1977 René Arnoux
- 2 European Formula Three Championship titles, in 1979 with Alain Prost and 1984 with Ivan Capelli
- 1 SCCA Super Vee title in 1986 with Didier Theys
- 1 German Formula Three Championship title, in 1985 with Volker Weidler

== Racecars ==
Year	Racing car	Racing Series	Picture
1967-1969	Martini MW1	Racing school	
1968	Martini MW1A	Formula 3	
1969	Martini MW2	Formula France	
1969	Martini MW2A	Formula Libre (hillclimbing)	
1969	Martini MW3	Formula 3	
1969	Martini MW3A	Formula Ford	
1970	Martini MK4	Formula France	
1970	Martini MK4A	Racing school	
1970	Martini MK5	Formula 3	
1970	Martini MK5A	Formula 3	
1971	Martini MK6	Formula Renault	
1971	Martini MK7	Formula 3	
1972	Martini MK8	Formula Renault	
1972	Martini MK9	Formula 3	
1972	Martini MK9A	Formula Atlantic	
1972	Martini MK10	Formula Renault	
1973	Martini MK11	Formula Renault	
1973	Martini MK12	Formula 3	
1973	Martini MK12E	Racing school	
1973	Martini MK13	Cancelled Formula 2	
1974	Martini MK14	Formula Renault	
1975	Martini MK15N	Formula Renault nationale	
1975	Martini MK15E	Formule Renault Europe	
1975	Martini MK16	Formula 2	
1976	Martini MK17	Formula Renault nationale	
1976	Martini MK18	Formule Renault Europe	
1976	Martini MK19	Formula 2	
1977	Martini MK20N	Formula Renault nationale	
1977	Martini MK20E	Formule Renault Europe	
1977	Martini MK21	Formula 3	
1977	Martini MK22	Formula 2	
1978	Martini MK21B	Formula 3	
1978	Martini MK23	Formula 1	
1978	Martini MK24	Formula Renault	
1978	Martini MK25	Formula 2 (Hillclimbing)	
1979	Martini MK26	Formula Renault	
1979	Martini MK27	Formula 3	
1979	Martini MK28	Formula 2 (Hillclimbing)	
1979	Martini MK29	Formula 2 (Hillclimbing)	
1980	Martini MK26E	Racing driving school	
1980	Martini MK30	Formula Renault	
1980	Martini MK31	Formula 3	
1981	Martini MK32	Formula 2 (Hillclimbing)	
1981	Martini MK33	Formula Renault	
1981	Martini MK34	Formula 3	
1981	Martini MK35	Formula Super Vee	
1982	Martini MK36	Formula Renault	
1982	Martini MK37	Formula 3	
1983	Martini MK38	Formula Renault	
1983	Martini MK39	Formula 3	
1983	Martini M001	Formula 2	
1984	Martini MK41	Formula Renault	
1984	Martini MK42	Formula 3	
1984	Martini MK43	Formula 2 (Hillclimbing)	
1984	Martini M002	Formula 2	
1985	Martini MK44	Formula Renault	
1985	Martini MK45	Formula 3	
1985	Martini MK47	Formula Super Vee	
1986	Martini MK48	Formula Renault	
1986	Martini MK49	Formula 3	
1987	Martini MK50	Formula Super Vee	
1987	Martini MK51	Formula Renault	
1987	Martini MK52	Formula 3	
1987	Martini MK53	Formula 2 (Hillclimbing)	
1988	Martini MK54	Formula Renault	
1988	Martini MK55	Formula 3	
1988	Martini MK56	Formula 2 (Hillclimbing)	
1989	Martini MK57	Formula Renault	
1989	Martini MK58	Formula 3	
1990	Martini MK59	Formula Renault	
1990	Martini MK60	Formula 3	
1991	Martini MK61	Formula Renault	
1991	Martini MK62	Formula 2 (Hillclimbing)	
1992	Martini MK63	Formula Renault	
1992	Martini MK64	Peugeot 905 Spider	
1993-1994	Martini MK65	Formula Renault	
1993	Martini MK66	Sport Prototype 3000	
1993	Martini MK67	Formula 2 (Hillclimbing)	
1993	Martini MK68	Peugeot 905 Spider	
1994	Martini MK69	Formula 2 (Hillclimbing)	
1995	Martini MK70	Racing school	
1995	Martini MK71	Formula Renault	
1996	Martini MK72	Formula Renault	
1996	Martini MK73	Formula 3	
1996	Martini MK74	Formula 2 (Hillclimbing)	
1996	Martini MK75	Racing school	
1997	Martini MK76	Formula Renault	
1997	Martini MK77	Formula 2 (Hillclimbing)	
1998	Martini MK78	Formula Renault	
1999	Martini MK79	Formula 3	
2000	Martini MK80	Formula 3	
2000	Martini MK81	Formula 2 (Hillclimbing)	
2000	Martini MK82	Hillclimbing	
