= Jan Lammers =

Dutch racing driver (born 1956)

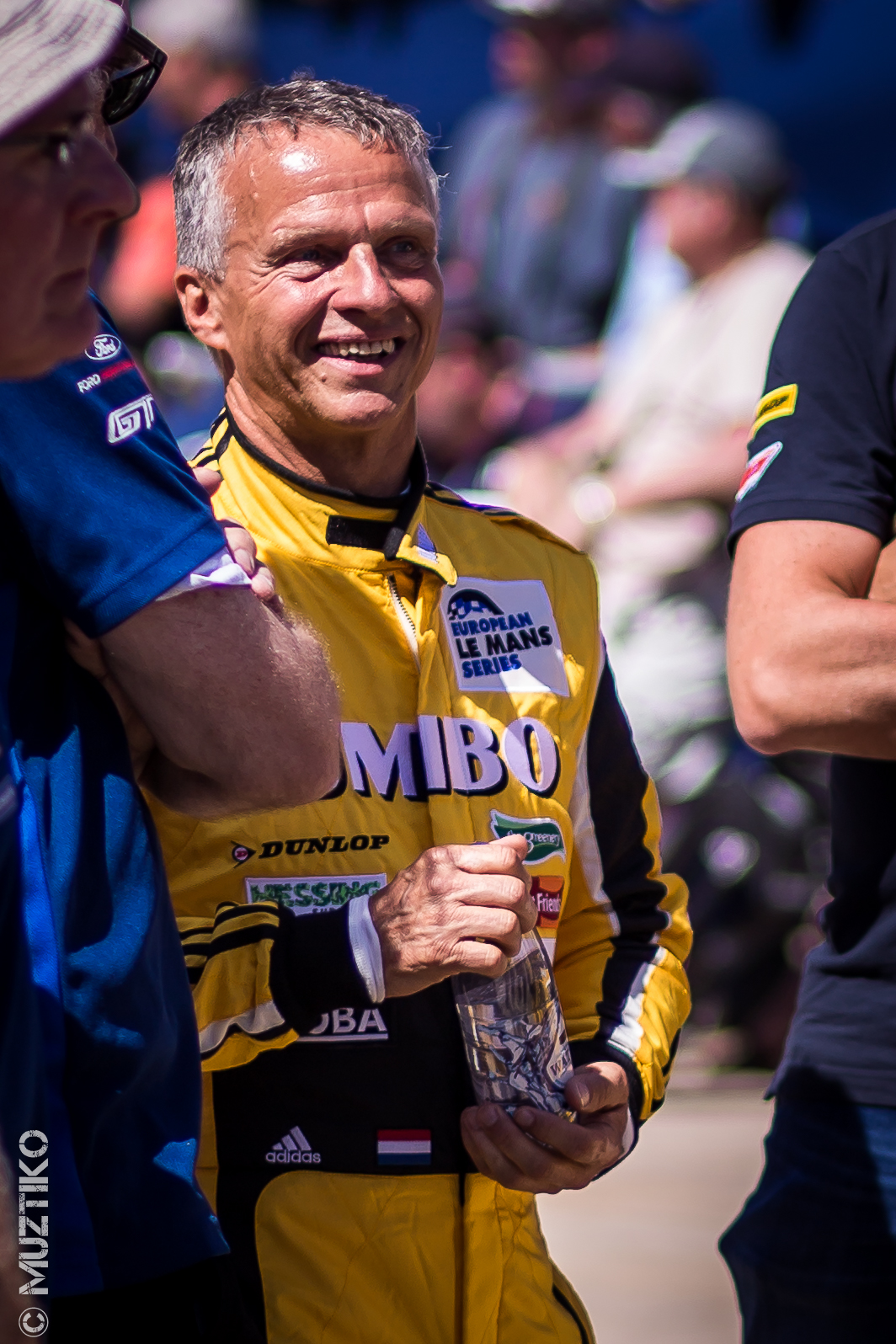
- Lammers at the 2017 24 Hours of Le Mans
- Born: Johannes Antonius Lammers; 2 June 1956 (age 70); Zandvoort, Netherlands
- Relatives: René Lammers (son)

Formula One World Championship career
- Nationality: (Netherlands) Dutch
- Active years: 1979–1982, 1992
- Team(s): Shadow, ATS, Ensign, Theodore and March
- Entries: 41 (23 starts)
- Championships: 0
- Wins: 0
- Podiums: 0
- Career points: 0
- Pole positions: 0
- Fastest laps: 0
- First entry: 1979 Argentine Grand Prix
- Last entry: 1992 Australian Grand Prix

24 Hours of Le Mans career
- Years: 1983–1984, 1987–1990, 1992–1993, 1998–2008, 2011, 2017, 2018
- Teams: Richard Lloyd Racing, GTi Engineering, Tom Walkinshaw Racing, Toyota Team Tom's, Racing for Holland, Hope Racing, Racing Team Nederland
- Best finish: 1st (1988)
- Class wins: 1 (1988)
- Categorisation: FIA Gold (until 2014); FIA Silver (2015–2016); FIA Bronze (2017–)

Johannes Antonius "Jan" Lammers (born 2 June 1956) is a Dutch racecar driver, most notable for winning the 1988 24 Hours of Le Mans world endurance race, for Silk Cut Jaguar/TWR; after four seasons in Formula One racing, from 1979 through 1982, for the F1 teams of Shadow, ATS, Ensign and Theodore, respectively. After a world-record setting ten-year hiatus, Lammers made a brief Formula One comeback, for two races, with team March in 1992. Aside from racing in these two of the highest leagues of global auto-sports, Lammers has raced in an exceptionally wide number of racing series and competitions, domestic and abroad, over four decades.

Later in life, Lammers became a team owner as well, first setting up his own Formula Opel Lotus team, Vitaal Racing, winning the EFDA Opel Lotus Euroseries with Peter Kox in 1989, then creating the Racing for Holland outfit that raced in sportscars class in 2001–2007. Between 2005 and 2009, he was the seatholder of the Dutch A1 Grand Prix team. During his Racing for Holland days, Lammers combined racing and management duties to win the 2002 and 2003 FIA Sportscar Championship.

Lammers started in touring cars, becoming the youngest Dutch champion in history in 1973 while repeating the act in 1976. He also raced in the European Renault 5 Turbo Cup, taking the 1983 and 1984 European titles. As a single-seater driver, his steps towards Formula One include securing the title in the 1978 European Formula 3 Championship. He remains the only Dutch driver to have done so. At the height of his career in Group C sports-prototypes, Lammers lifted the crown in the 1992 Japanese Sportscar Championship.

Lammers has further raced in Formula Ford, Formula 2, IndyCar racing, International F3000, Japanese F3000, the British Touring Car Championship (BTCC), BPR Global GT, FIA GT, the European Le Mans Series, the IMSA SportsCar Championship, the American Le Mans Series, Grand-Am, and the Dakar Rally.

Guest appearances include the Grand Prix Masters for retired F1 drivers, the BMW M1 Procar Series, the Dutch Supercar Challenge, the Dubai 24 Hours and Gulf 12 Hours endurance races, the VW Scirocco R-Cup and the Dutch domestic Tulpenrallye.

In recent years, Lammers was an important figurehead / ambassador for reviving the Dutch Formula One GP on the coastal dunes situated Zandvoort circuit, achieved since 2021.

== Early career ==
=== Touring cars ===
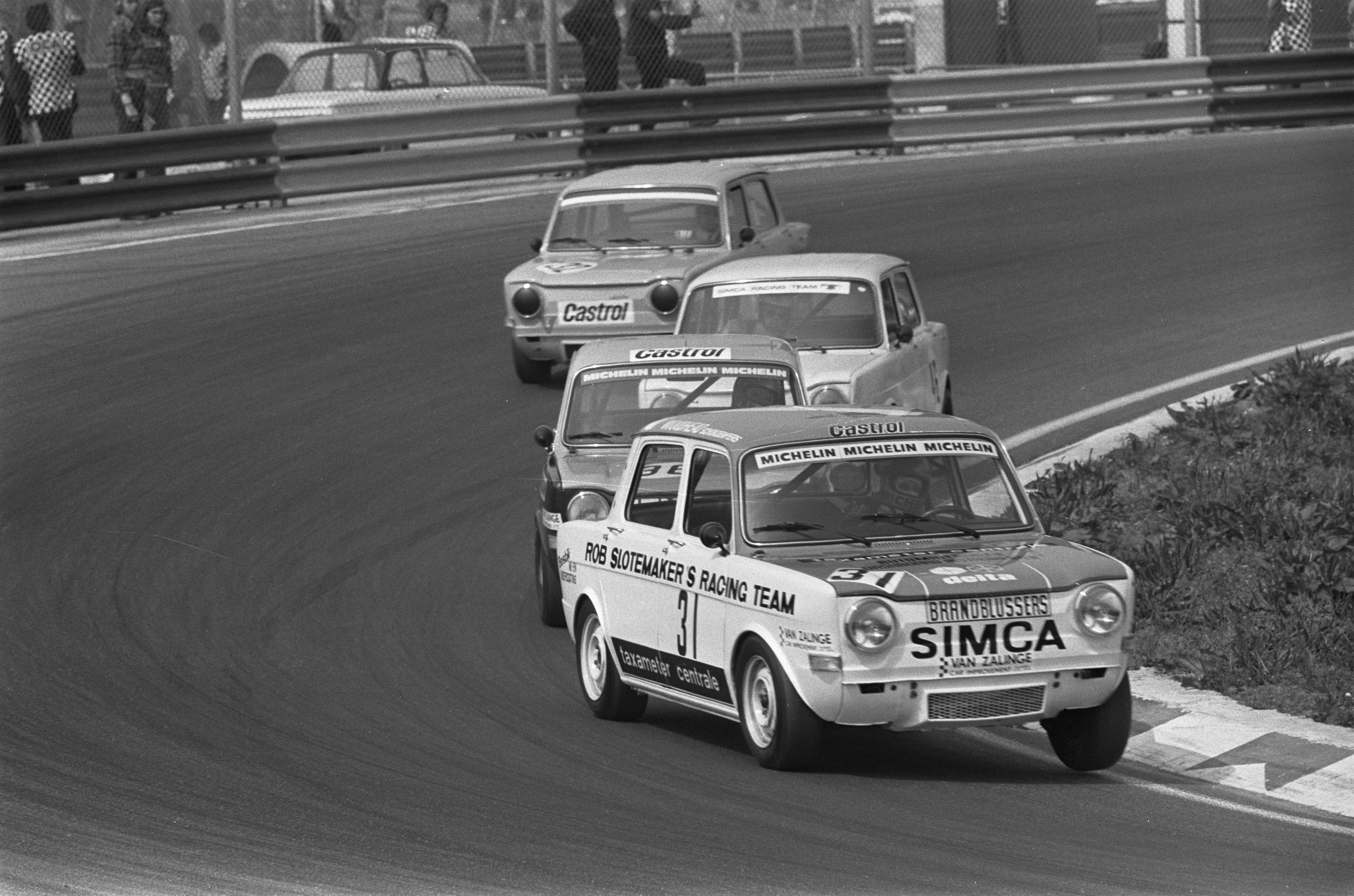
Lammers racing the Simca Rallye 2 at Zandvoort

Born in Zandvoort, Lammers grew up washing cars at the nearby school for advanced and anti-skid driving skills training, run by Dutch touring-car legend Rob Slotemaker. Encouraged by Slotemaker, and while still under-age for a regular Dutch driving licence, the teenager nicknamed 'Jantje' ('Little John') was also hired to teach drivers on a private, closed track, how to safely recover a car from a skid situation. Having recognised Lammers' talent, Slotemaker set him up in a Simca Rallye 2 for the 7,500-9,000 guilder Group 1 production car class in the 1973 Dutch Touring Car Championship. At 16 years of age, Lammers won his first-ever car race and continued to take the season title in his rookie year, becoming the youngest Dutch national auto racing champion in history.

Two more years in the Simca followed in a revised 8,000-10,000 guilder class, with Lammers taking four more wins in 1974 but narrowly missing out on a title repeat. Wins elude him in 1975 but his name has already been made. In 1976, he switched to an Opel Dealer Team Holland-run Opel Kadett GT/E to take his second Dutch title.

== Road to Formula One ==
=== Formula Ford ===
Dovetailing his 1976 touring-car campaign with a first season in Formula Ford, Lammers quickly realised his future is in single-seaters. Driving a Crosslé in the Benelux, German and European Championship, he won pole position at his first race, and won at the Jyllandring and Mengen and shining in the soaking wet finale of the Formula Ford Festival at Brands Hatch.

=== Formula 3 ===
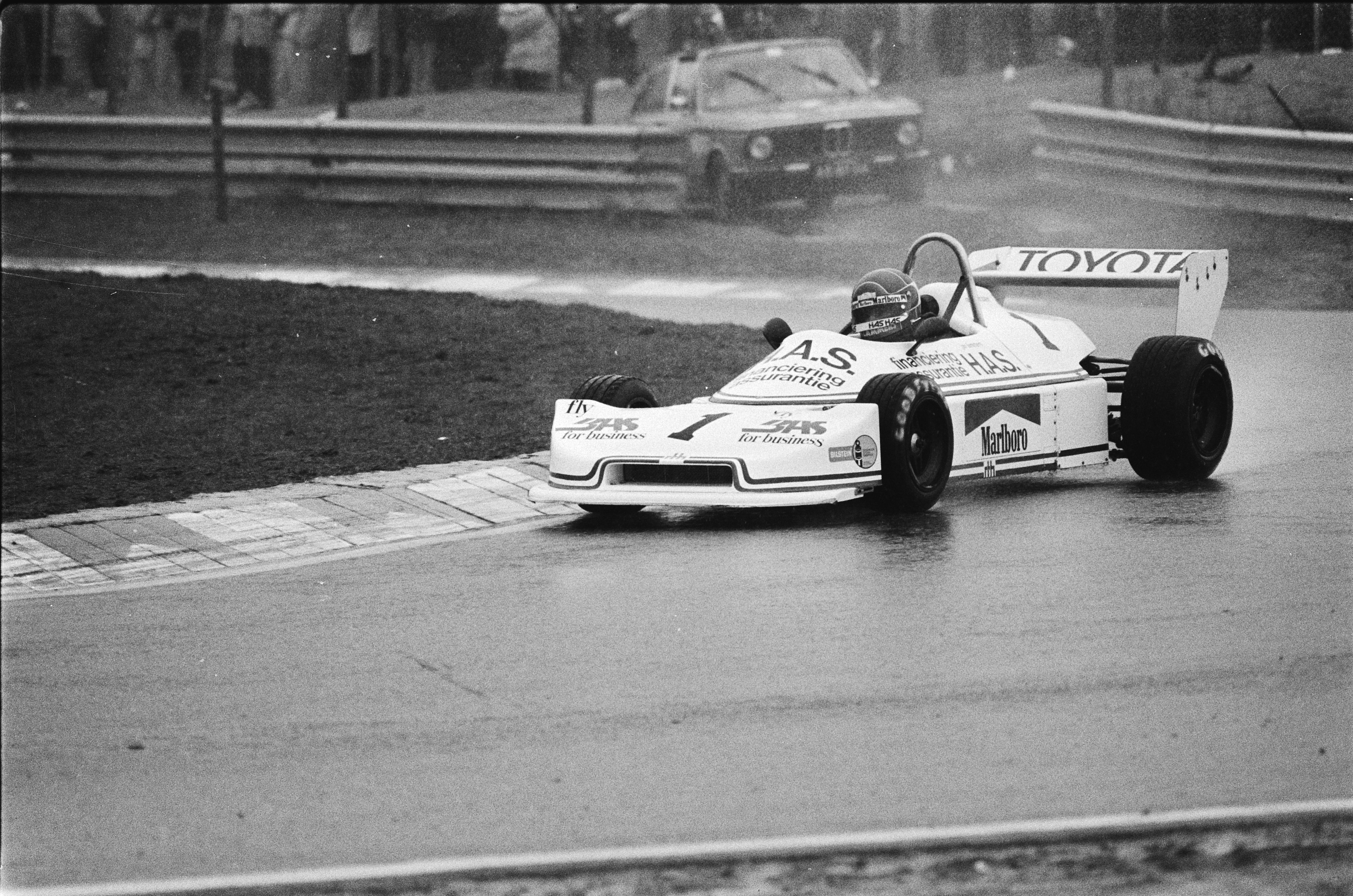
Lammers showing the way around at a wet Zandvoort in Formula 3

Stepping up with Hawke to Formula 3 in 1977 proved to be a false dawn, as the Hawke proved no match for the Marches and the Ralts. For 1978, he switched to the Racing Team Holland outfit run by Alan Docking, with fellow future Formula 1 driver Huub Rothengatter and later Indy 500 winner Arie Luyendijk as his team mates. This was an inspired move as it led to Lammers winning the 1978 European Formula 3 Championship after a close battle with Swede Anders Olofsson, while beating highly touted rivals such as Alain Prost, Nelson Piquet and Nigel Mansell. Lammers took wins at Zandvoort, Magny-Cours, Karlskoga and in the famous Lotteria race at Monza to lift the crown. At the time, leading British magazine Autosport predicted: "He just has to be a World Champion of the eighties."

=== Formula 2 ===
Having received an offer from the works March Formula 2 team, Lammers decided to jump the category to go straight into Formula One with Shadow in 1979. He would make his single Formula 2 appearance in 1980, driving a March-BMW in his home race at Zandvoort, where he retired from third place.

== Formula One ==
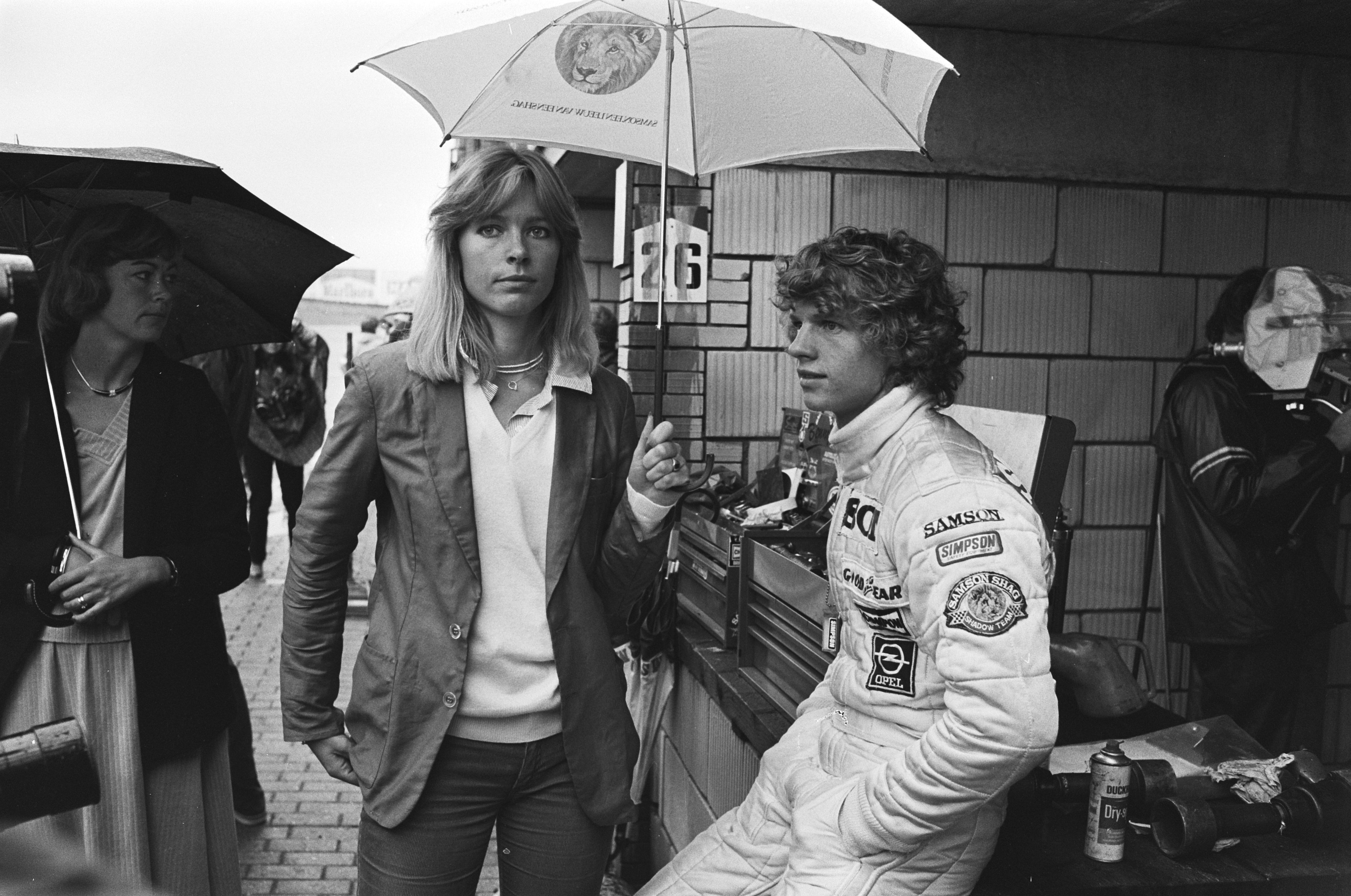
Lammers at the 1979 Dutch Grand Prix, debuting in F1

Lammers spent four seasons in Formula One, racing largely uncompetitive machinery and failing to score a World Championship point in any of his 41 appearances. He was considered talented, however; Lammers only narrowly missed out on the chance to join Ferrari in 1982 to replace Gilles Villeneuve, who was killed at Zolder earlier in the year. The drive went to Patrick Tambay instead.

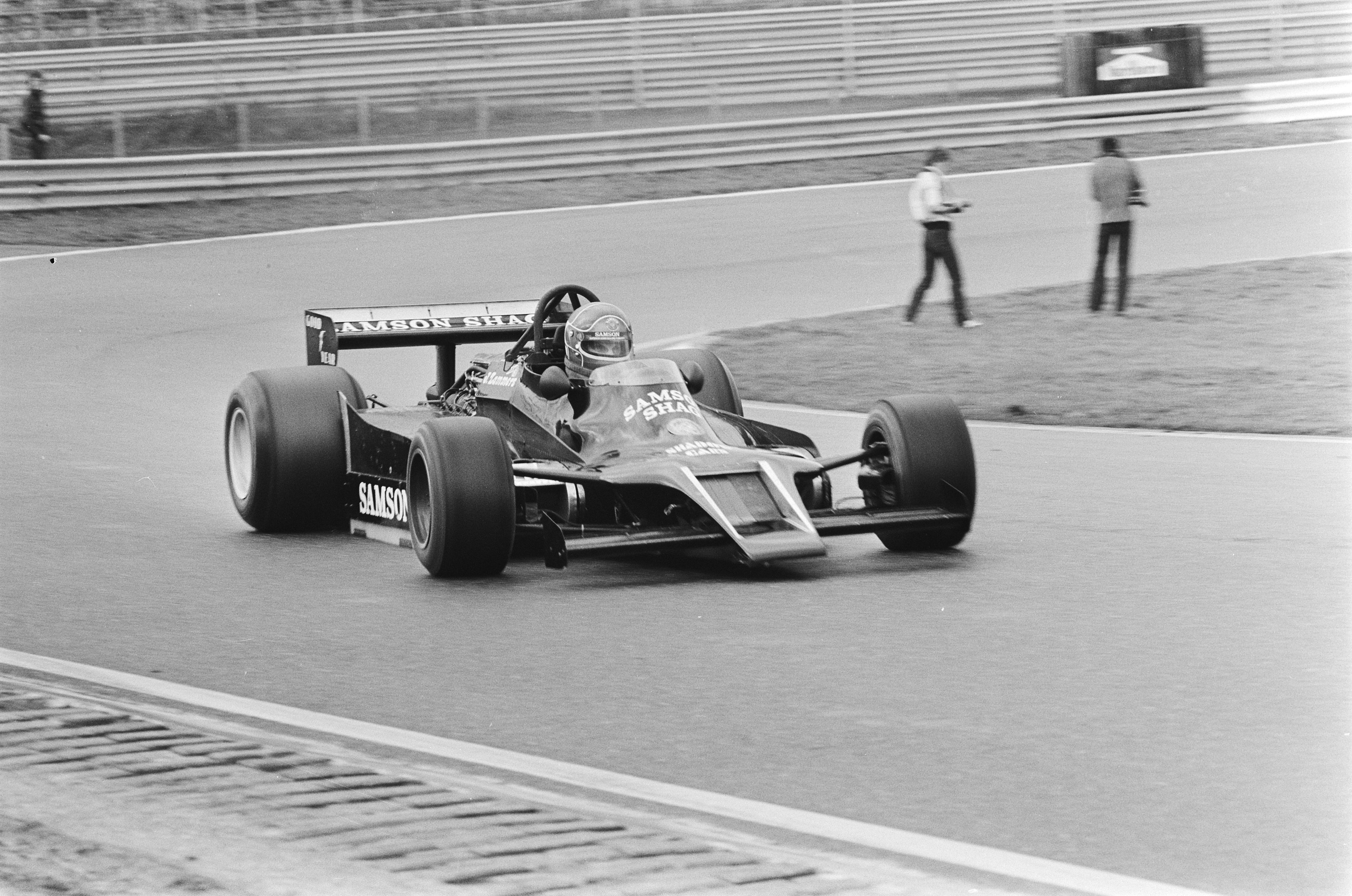
Lammers presenting the Samson-liveried Shadow DN9B at Zandvoort

In 1979, Lammers and fellow rookie Elio de Angelis joined Shadow, but the team led by American Don Nichols was close to shutting down; the pair failed to make an impact with a poor car, with de Angelis scoring the team's only points that year, coming in fourth place at Watkins Glen. Lammers' best result was a ninth place in the Canadian GP. Both were invited by Colin Chapman to test for Lotus, with De Angelis getting the job for 1980; Lammers was unwilling to wait for Chapman's decision. Instead, he decided to sign for the German-owned ATS team.

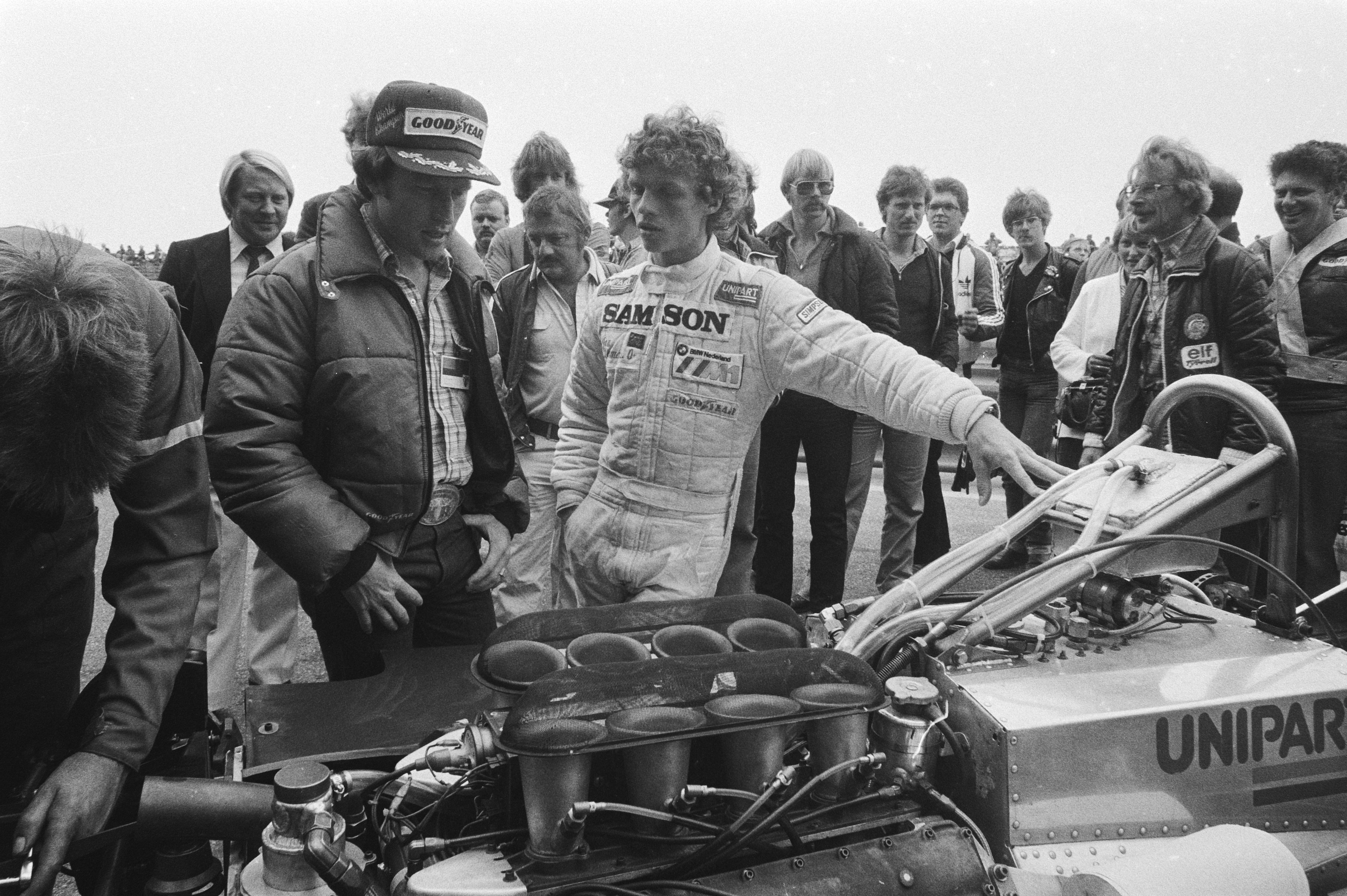
Multiple 500cc champion Kenny Roberts chats with Lammers at the 1980 Dutch GP

The underfunded outfit handed Lammers the old D3 car while team leader Marc Surer debuted with the new D4, but when Surer broke his legs in an accident, Lammers took the D4. He immediately qualified fourth on the grid at Long Beach but the car broke on the opening lap of the race. Other notable ATS performances included battling Jody Scheckter's Ferrari at Zolder, and retiring from a points-scoring position at Jarama. When Surer made a return to ATS, Lammers moved to Ensign. Meanwhile, his former teammate De Angelis had a fine season at Lotus while Lammers failed to qualify the cumbersome Ensign on several occasions.

For 1981, Lammers was invited for a test to become Nelson Piquet's teammate at Brabham, but team principal Bernie Ecclestone chose to go with Mexican pay driver Hector Rebaque. Instead, Lammers rejoined ATS and performed well in the controversial non-championship South African GP at Kyalami; he fought De Angelis for second place until being hit by brake problems. When Swede Slim Borgudd arrived with healthy funding from pop band ABBA, Lammers was made to gave up his seat.

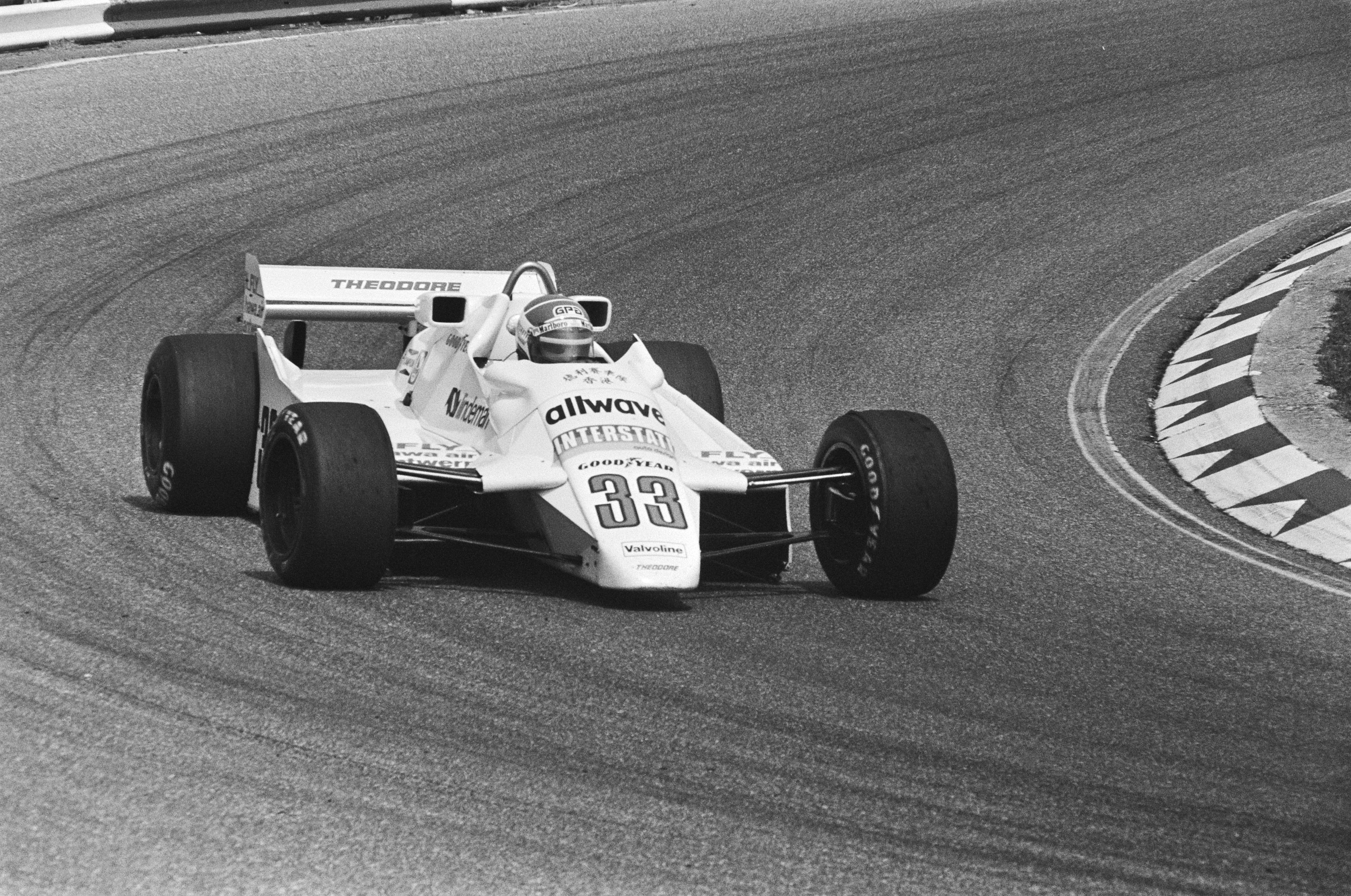
Jan Lammers driving the Theodore TY02 at the Dutch Grand Prix in 1982

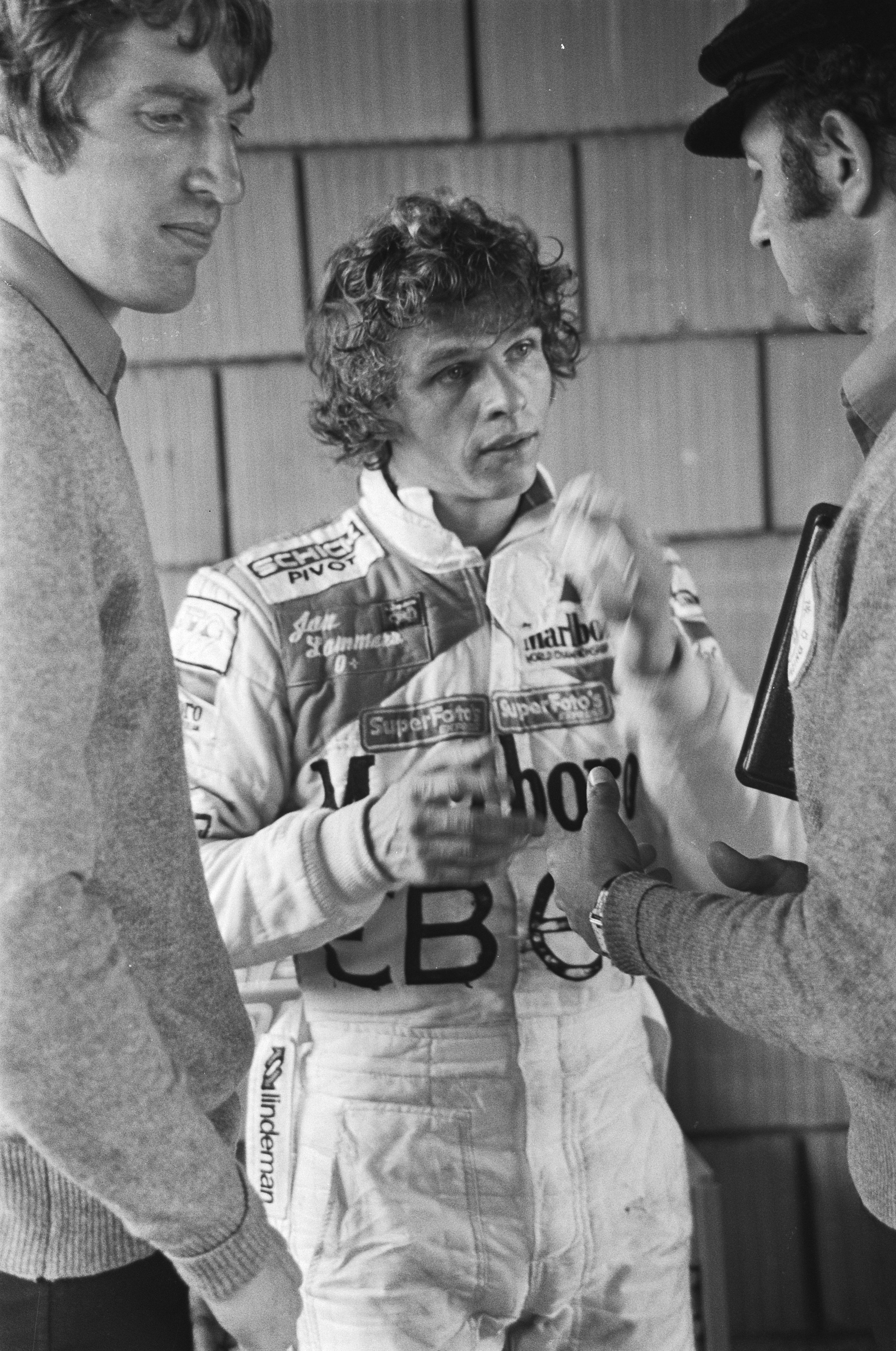
Lammers in talks at the 1982 Dutch Grand Prix

In 1982, Lammers switched to Theodore but the team was largely underfunded. At Monaco, Lammers' TY02 had to stay on nude rims for a day because the team did not have any tyres. Still seen as a natural talent, he was asked by Renault to replace the injured Prost at Detroit, only for the championship leader to recover in time. Lammers stepped back into the Theodore, but before the start of the first session, he was approached by Ferrari to replace Gilles Villeneuve from Zandvoort on. In a twist of fate, the Theodore's throttle stuck during the session, causing Lammers to hit the wall and break his thumb. As a result, Patrick Tambay signed the Ferrari contract. At Zandvoort, instead of driving the Ferrari, Lammers took part in his last Grand Prix before Tommy Byrne took over the seat.

In late 1985, Lammers was given a test by Toleman at Estoril but with the team unable to get a tyre contract for 1986, plans for a Formula One return fell through. In 1989, another Formula One opportunity came to nothing when Lammers was asked by Ken Tyrrell to replace Michele Alboreto, but the Dutchman decided to stick with TWR Jaguar, and Tyrrell signed Jean Alesi instead.

Then in 1992, Lammers made a surprise Formula One comeback when he stepped in at March for the final two races of the season – a full ten years after his initial final Grand Prix, a record career gap in Formula One. Replacing Karl Wendlinger, Lammers lapped sixth fastest in wet free practice at Suzuka, before retiring from the race with a broken gearbox. At Adelaide, he finished 12th. Looking set to continue with March in 1993, his Formula One ambitions received a blow when the team was denied an engine deal by Ilmor unless they paid their bills. This left Lammers as a spectator at Kyalami, after which the team folded.

Another Formula One option hit the rocks when Lammers was signed by the DAMS F3000 team for its debut season in 1996, having already tested their GD-01 car all through 1995. The project remained stillborn when DAMS fails to gather sufficient funding.

== Sportscars ==
Fed up with driving inferior machines at the back of the Formula One grid, Lammers decided to switch to sportscar racing where he became a mainstay for the next three decades, both as a driver and a team owner. His time in Group C included seasons with Richard Lloyd Racing's private Porsche 956, the works Jaguar team and the works Toyota team, while in the days of LMP900 and LMP1, Lammers ran his own Racing for Holland team with the Japanese Dome S101 chassis. His final call at Le Mans came in 2017 and 2018 when he raced the Racing Team Nederland Dallara in LMP2, sharing with Rubens Barrichello and Jumbo Supermarkets CEO and team owner Frits van Eerd.

=== Prototypes ===
Having turned his back on Formula One, Lammers started his World Sportscar Championship career in 1983 by joining top Porsche privateer Richard Lloyd Racing, taking several podium finishes with Thierry Boutsen, Keke Rosberg and Jonathan Palmer, while finishing sixth on his Le Mans debut. In 1984, he was paired with Palmer, and the Canon-liveried 956 takes victory over the works cars at Brands Hatch. The two add podiums at Monza, the Nürburgring, Sandown Park and Imola, and retire from Le Mans in a winning position.

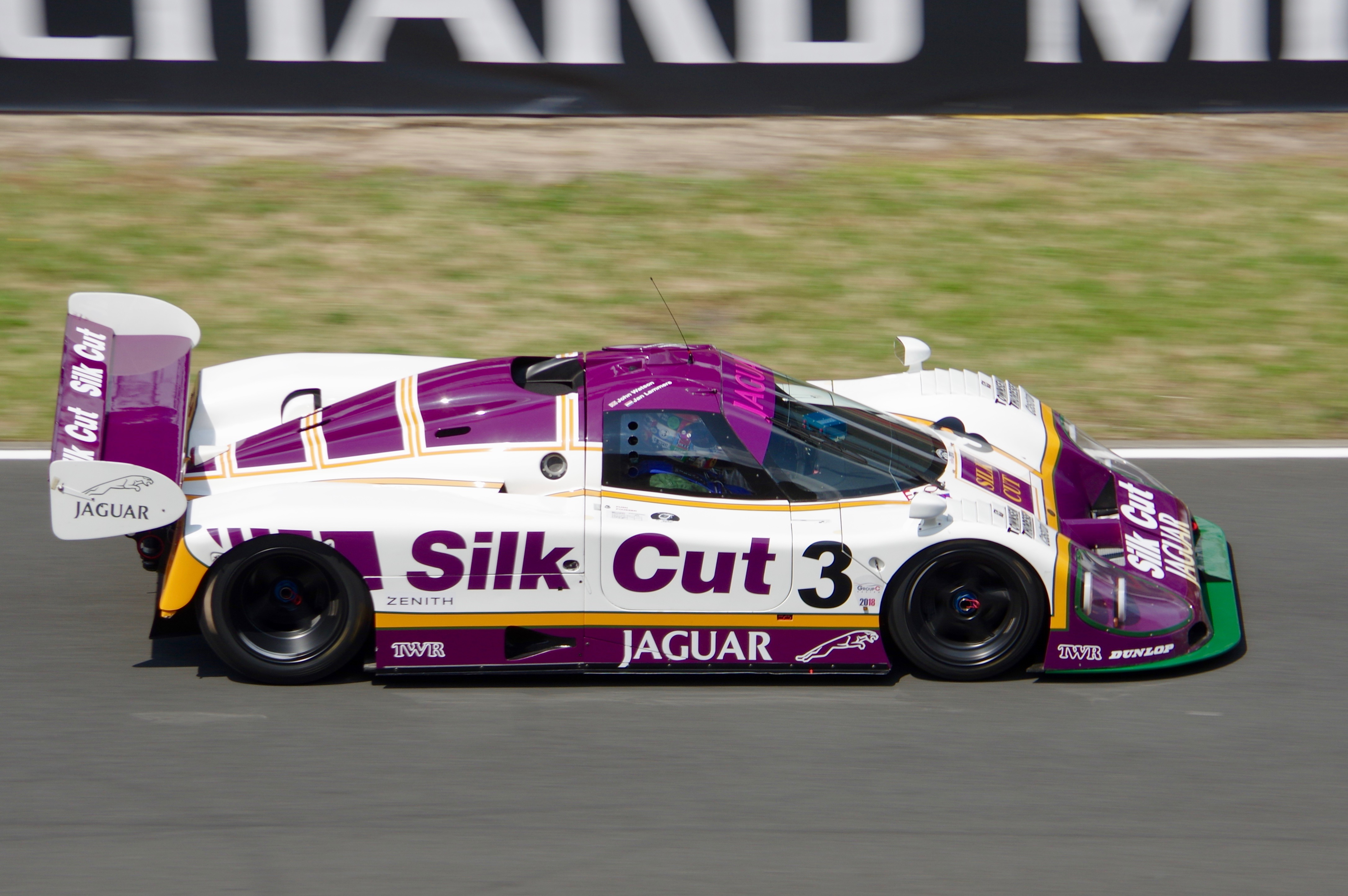
Teaming up with John Watson at Silk Cut Jaguar in 1987

A mid-season switch saw Lammers snapped up by Tom Walkinshaw at TWR Jaguar, and on his debut for the team at a very hot Shah Alam in Malaysia, he finished in second place. Meanwhile, he made his IMSA GTP debut racing a March-Buick at Miami with Roberto Guerrero. In the 1986 Daytona 24 Hours, driving the BF Goodrich Porsche 962, he was heading for victory when his brakes failed, leading to a sizeable crash that he escaped from. Later in the season, when his promising IndyCar adventure collapsed with the disappointing Eagle, Walkinshaw was quick to lure Lammers back to TWR. The Dutchman was immediately competitive with second at Spa and third at Jerez, before racing for Nissan at Watkins Glen in IMSA GTP.

In 1987, Lammers joined TWR Jaguar – now sponsored by Silk Cut – as a proper works driver, and was teamed with Grand Prix veteran John Watson. They won at Jarama, Monza and Fuji and take podiums at Silverstone, Brands Hatch and Spa. At Le Mans, third driver Win Percy crashed their car out of the race. Team orders meant that they finished second in the championship.

1988 would become Lammers' most successful season in Group C racing. Now paired with ex-Lotus Formula One driver Johnny Dumfries, the two finished second at Spa and third at Brno, before being joined by Andy Wallace at the Le Mans 24 Hours. Lammers drove for 13 hours to be the anchor in a popular win for TWR Jaguar, the first for the marque since 1957. For this, he was congratulated by Queen Elizabeth II and rewarded with the title of Honorary Member of the BRDC. In IMSA, Lammers was part of the crew that wins the Daytona 24 Hours, after he was moved over from his retired car to join Martin Brundle, Raul Boesel and John Nielsen in the lead Jaguar entry, winning the race. With regular teammate Davy Jones, Lammers won at Del Mar and ended up on the podium at West Palm Beach, Lime Rock, Mid-Ohio and Sears Point.

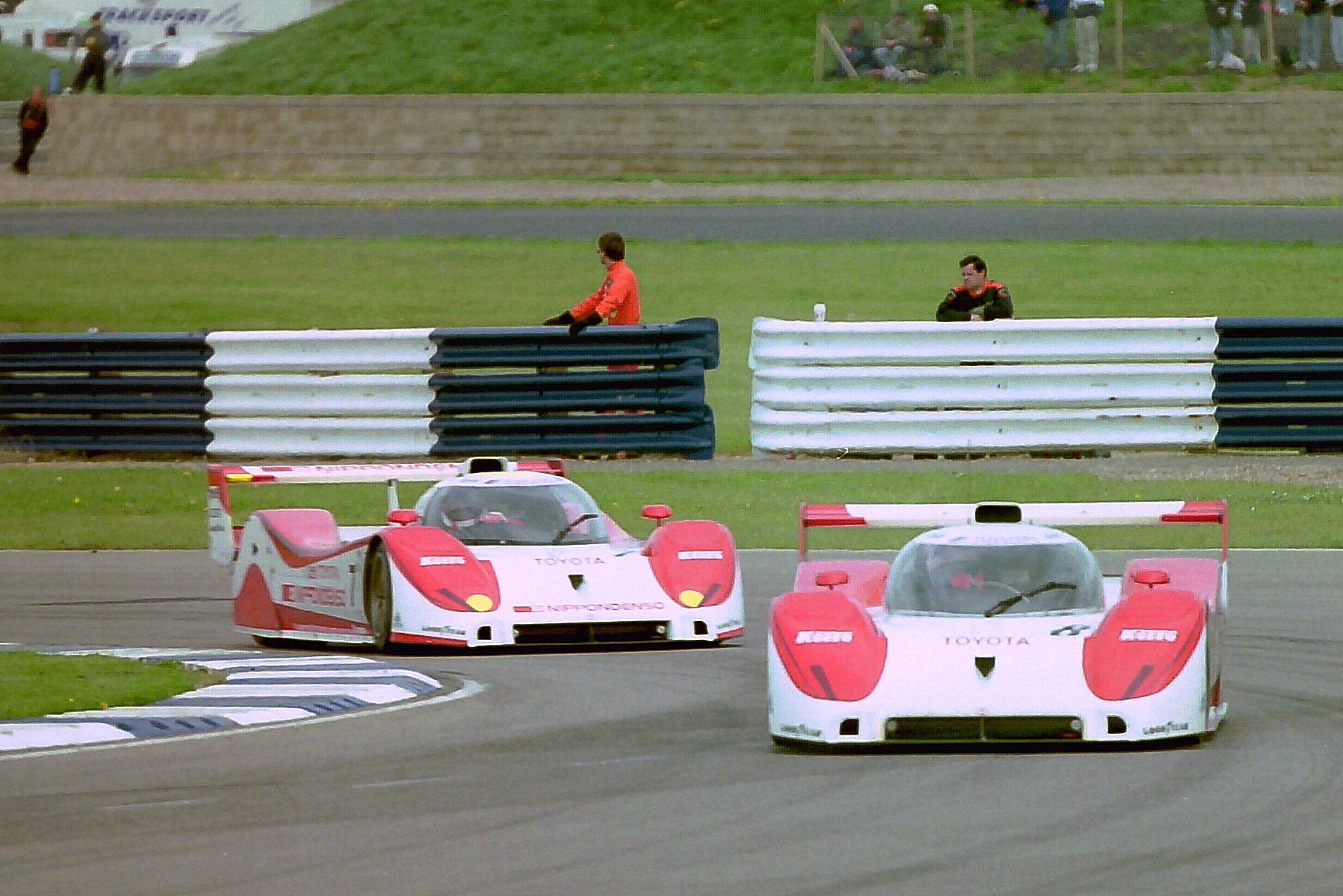
The Jan Lammers/Andy Wallace Toyota TS010 leads the example of Geoff Lees/Hitoshi Ogawa at the 1992 FIA WSC round at Silverstone.

In 1989, the Jaguars were outclassed by the resurgent Mercedes effort, with Lammers only managing to score a second place at Jarama with Patrick Tambay. In the US, Lammers was more successful, winning in Portland and Del Mar, taking second in the Daytona 24 Hours, Lime Rock, Mid-Ohio and Road America and third at Sears Point and Topeka. The following year, Lammers won the Daytona 24 Hours again, this time paired with Andy Wallace and Davy Jones, before taking third in the Sebring 12 Hours. In the WSC, however, Jaguar's new turbo engine proved fast but unreliable, and together with Wallace, Lammers only picked up a pair of second places. Switching to the proven atmospheric V12 for Le Mans, Jaguar takes the double, but Lammers is in the second Jaguar across the line, having to recover from an earlier crash by teammate Franz Konrad.

Having opted for a switch to Toyota, Lammers decided to wait in the wings for the new programme to come alive in 1992. In the World Championship, mated with Geoff Lees, Lammers took two podium finishes, second at Suzuka and third at Magny-Cours. In the Japanese Sports-Prototype Championship, however, two wins at Fuji and Mine added up to another title for the Dutchman. One more Toyota appearance followed in 1993, finishing sixth for the Japanese constructor in the Le Mans 24 Hours.

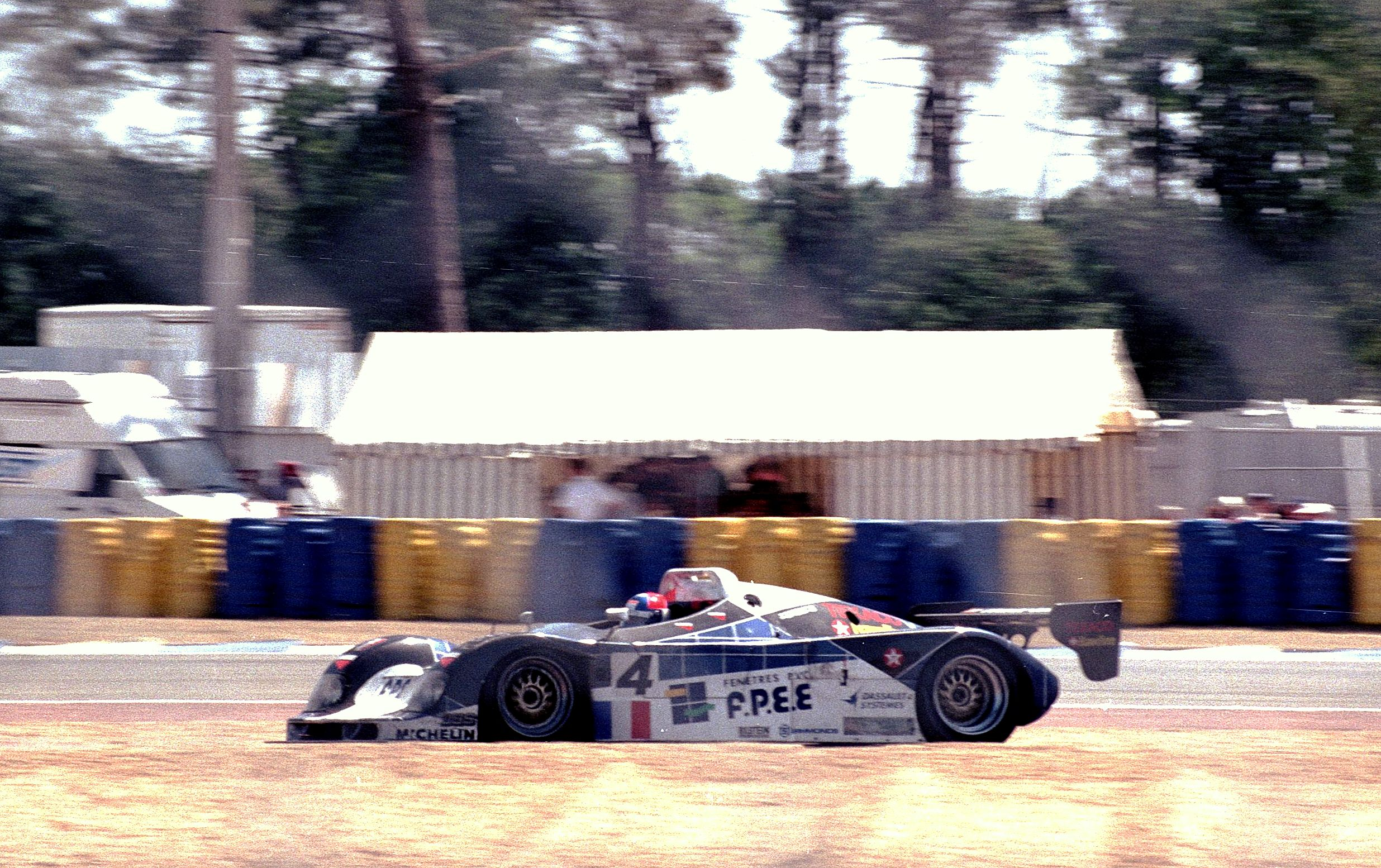
With Mario Andretti and Derek Warwick in the Courage-Porsche C36 at the 1996 Le Mans 24 Hours

In 1995, Lammers returned to IMSA to compete at Daytona and Sebring in the Auto Toy Store Spice-Chevrolet SE90. With Andy Wallace, he won the Sebring 12 Hours on the road but a timekeeping error declared the Fermín Velez/Andy Evans/Eric van de Poele Ferrari 333SP as the winner, while as a guest driver, Lammers joined Derek Warwick and Mario Andretti in a Courage-Porsche C36 to finish sixth in the 1996 Le Mans 24 Hours.

In 1999 and 2000, Lammers returned to prototype racing, as Konrad Motorsport moved up to the LMP class with a Ford-engined Lola B98/10, followed by a B2K/10, while in the US, he joined J&P Motorsports to race a Panoz LMP-1 Roadster-S. In the meantime, he progressed with setting up his own team for 2001. At Konrad, teaming up with countrymen Tom Coronel and Peter Kox served as a prequel to that.

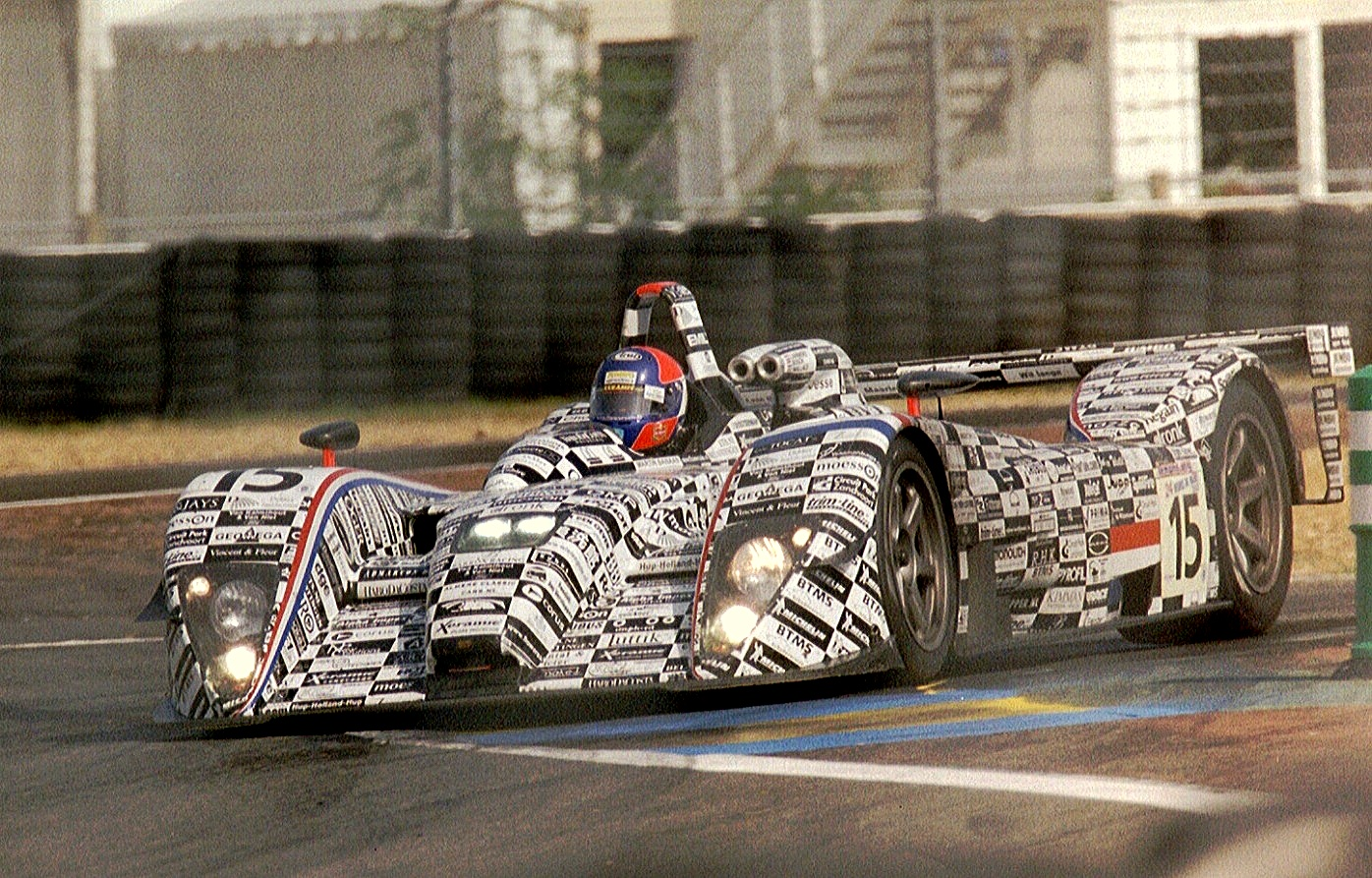
Lammers in the Dome S101 in the Ford chicane at the 2003 Le Mans 24 Hours

Lammers embarked on a new era of sportscar success in 2001 when he rekindled his ties with Japanese manufacturer Dome to race their Judd-engined S101, entering it in the new FIA Sportscar Championship and the Le Mans 24 Hours with young Dutch-born but Belgian-licensed Val Hillebrand as his teammate. For Le Mans, the Dutchman offered small segments of bodywork to small, private sponsors, giving the car the look of a driving chequered flag. A contribution of 2200 euros was enough to become a Racing for Holland sponsor. Lammers and Hillebrand dominated the final round of the championship before going into the new season as clear favourites, while placing themselves amongst the Audis at Le Mans. With three wins and five podiums, Lammers and Hillebrand won the 2002 title in the leading SR1 class, before doubling up in 2003, again with three wins and five podiums. Meanwhile in 2002, Lammers raced the Crawford SSC2K at Daytona and joined Champion for Sebring to take third in their Audi R8.

When the FIA Sportscar Championship collapses after 2003, the Dome continued at Le Mans, where Lammers took seventh in 2004 along with Elton Julian and countryman John Bosch, the trio copying the result in 2005. In the meantime, the Dutchman guested at Doran-Lista to take fourth in the 2004 Daytona 24 Hours and with Dyson Racing at Sebring and the Petit Le Mans, finishing third in the latter. In the 2005 Daytona 24 Hours, Lammers stepped into the Howard-Boss Motorsports Crawford DP03 to claim another US podium with third. Rejoining them for 2006, their second cooperation gained no results.

With the start of the Le Mans Series in 2005, Racing for Holland signs up for assorted rounds in 2005, 2006 and 2007, but by now the Dome is outclassed by the more recent LMP1 designs. After he shut down the team while continuing to pay off its debts well into the next decade, Lammers returned as a gun for hire in 2008. In an LMP2 season dominated by Jos Verstappen and the Van Merksteijn Porsche RS Spyder, Lammers teamed up with the Swiss Horag-Lista team's RS Spyder to finish the year fourth in class, along with teammate Didier Theys. At Le Mans in 2008, he joined Greg Pickett and Klaus Graf in the Charouz Racing System Lola-Judd B07/17, but the car failed to finish.

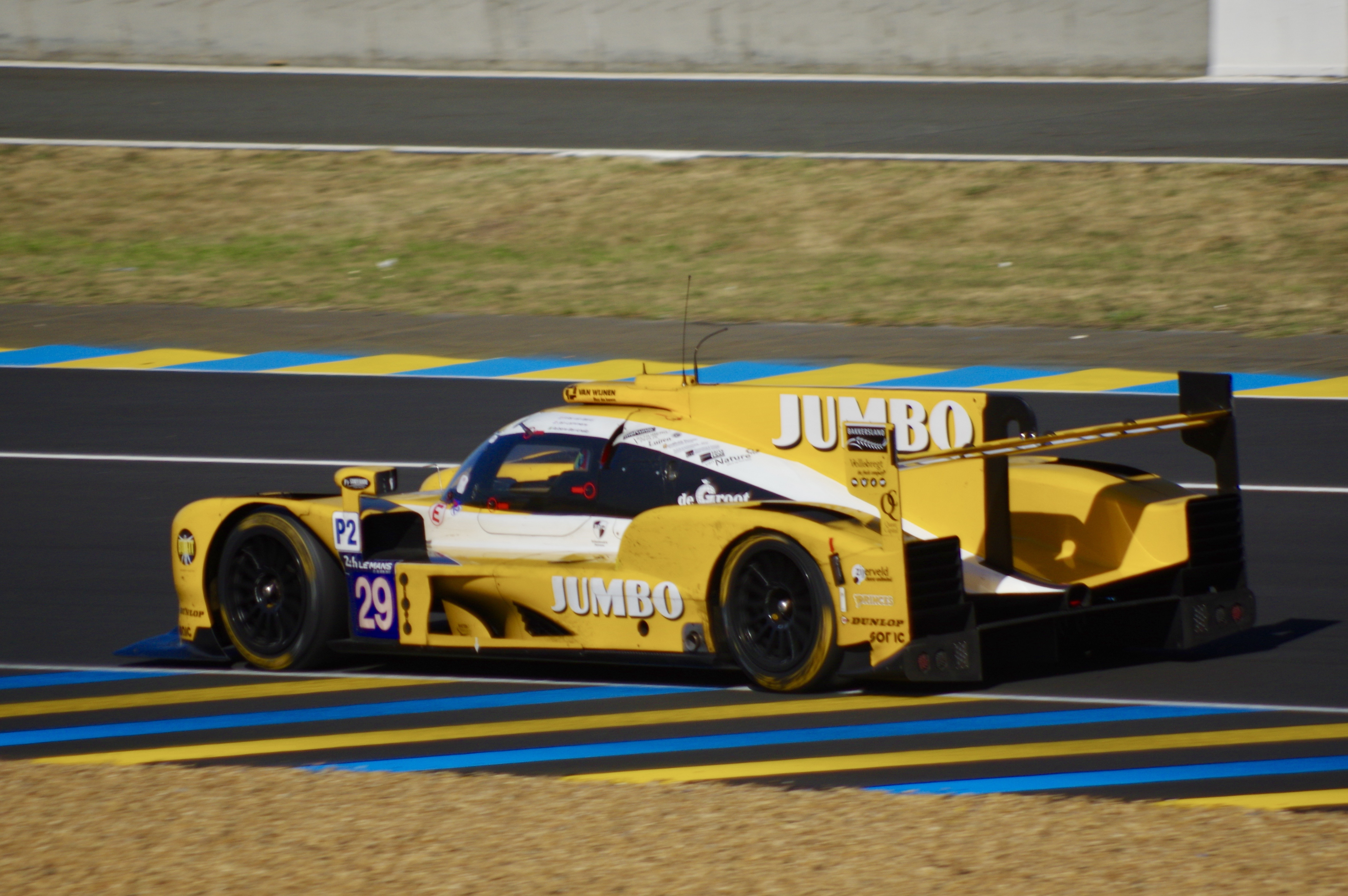
Jan Lammers shared the Racing Team Nederland Dallara P217 with Rubens Barrichello and Frits van Eerd.

Having gone into semi-retirement from 2010, Lammers hooked up with Hope Racing to race the experimental SwissHyTech Hybrid-engined ORECA 01, and did one 2016 Le Mans Cup round in the Racing Team Holland Ligier-Nissan JSP3, but waited until 2017 for his final foray in top-level prototype racing, signing up for a three-year spell with Racing Team Nederland, the team funded by Dutch supermarket mogul Frits van Eerd. Racing their Dallara-Gibson P217 in the LMP2 class of the European Le Mans Series, Lammers and Van Eerd claimed a seventh and eighth as their best results in a full 2017 ELMS season. In 2018 and 2019, Lammers acted as third driver to Van Eerd and Giedo van der Garde at Le Mans before closing the curtain on his active career.

=== GTs ===
On the back of the failed DAMS Formula One project, Lammers joined the Lotus Racing outfit for BPR Global GT in 1996. The GTI team is headed by countryman Toine Hezemans along with Ian Foley and George Howard-Chappell and runs a pair of Lotus Esprit V8s in the GT1 category. Teamed with Alex Portman, Perry McCarthy, Chris Goodwin, Andy Wallace, Fabien Giroix and Mike Hezemans, he claimed pole at the Nürburgring and finished second at Silverstone, but apart from that, the car proved very unreliable. In 1997, its Lotus Elise GT1 successor was outclassed by McLaren-BMW and Mercedes in the inaugural FIA GT Championship. After the Lotus takeover by Proton, the GT1 programme was quickly canned.

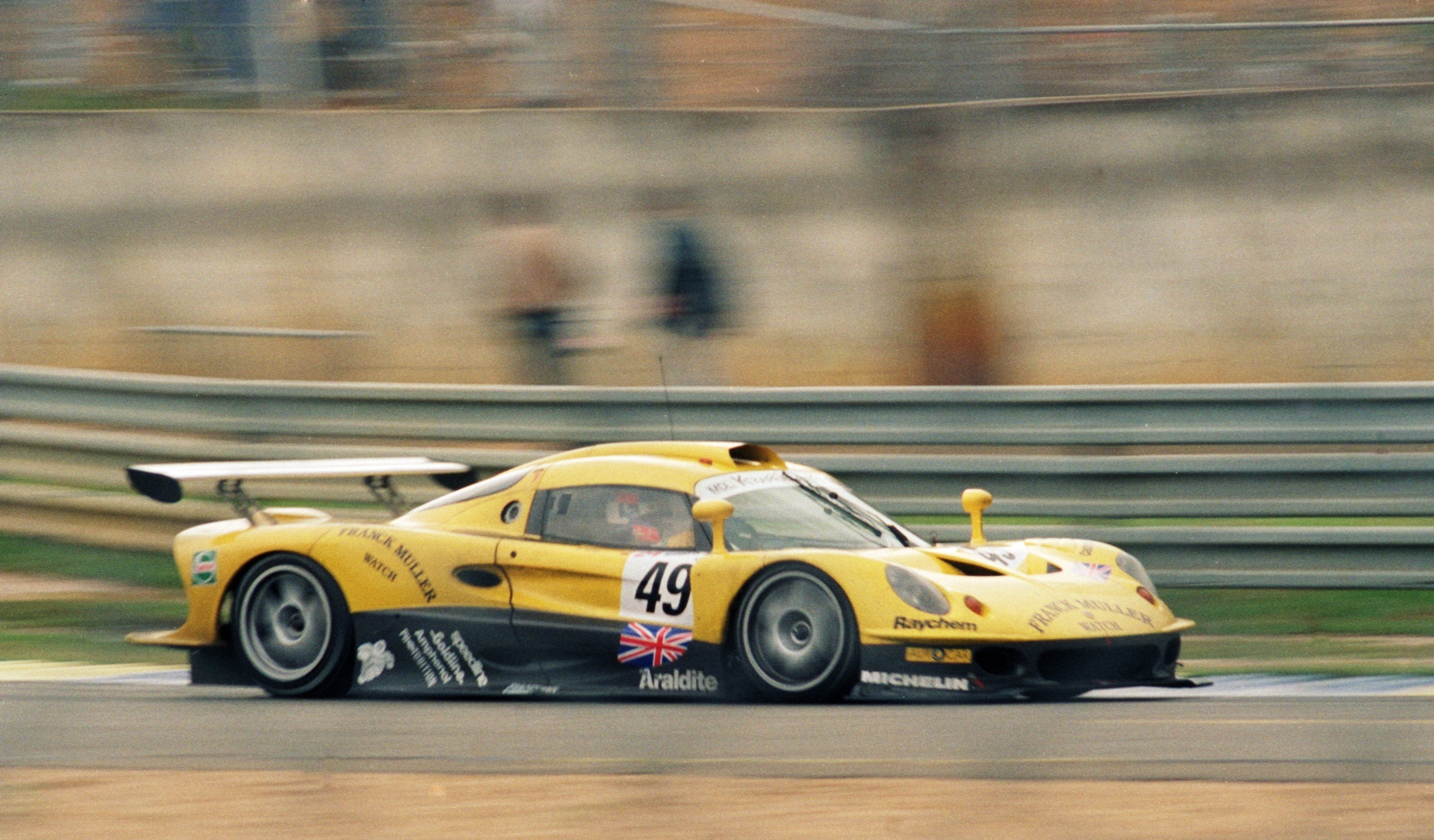
With Mike Hezemans and Alexander Grau at the 1997 Le Mans 24 Hours

In 1998, Lammers raced the Bitter GT1 for Team Hezemans before switching to GT2 with Roock Racing and Konrad Motorsport, while helping to develop Nissan's new R390 GT1 car. At Le Mans, he joined Erik Comas and Andrea Montermini to finish sixth, as the Nissans were beaten by Porsche's 911 GT1. Late in the season, Lammers returned to Konrad to share a 911 GT2 with Franz Konrad in the Petit Le Mans, followed by a win at Laguna Seca.

Following a five-year GT break, Lammers joined Prodrive to drive their Ferrari 550 Maranello in the 2003 Petit Le Mans, finishing fourth in the GTS class, and then in 2008, having closed down his own team, Lammers made a few guest appearances in GT racing, driving the Spa 24 Hours in the Lamborghini Murciélago R-GT for the IPB-Spartak team. Meanwhile, he ran a full season of ADAC GT sharing Reiter Engineering's Lamborghini Gallardo GT3 with countryman Marius Ritskes, with three second places as his best results. Continuing in 2009 under the Racing Team Holland banner (not to be confused with Racing for Holland), the duo failed to score any more points. A one-off at Spa in the team's GT4 Ford Mustang FR500C failed to materialise.

Another single GT4 appearance took place in 2016 with a Ginetta G55 GT4 drive in the Paul Ricard 24 Hours for Team Africa Le Mans. His final two GT races came at his farewell weekend at Le Mans in 2019, sharing a Bentley Continental GT3 with Greg Mills for the same Team Africa Le Mans.

== Other championships ==
=== IndyCar ===
In 1985, Lammers made his IndyCar debut, driving for the AMI Racing team. His strong performance in their March-Cosworth 85C allowed him to be signed by the Forsythe-Green team, racing their Lola-Cosworth T800 and T900 in the final three races of the season, Lammers scored points for them with a best finish of fifth at Laguna Seca. At Miami, Lammers challenged Danny Sullivan for victory before making a mistake towards the end. This led to Dan Gurney's All-American Racers signing Lammers as their lead driver for the 1986 season, but that year's Eagle GC86 proved uncompetitive and Gurney withdrew the team ahead of the Indianapolis 500. Taking over the Machinists Union GC86 for three races later in the season led to an eighth at Laguna Seca and ninth at Miami.

=== F3000 ===
In 1986, Lammers took up on an offer from Eddie Jordan Racing to replace Russell Spence in the team's March-Cosworth 86B. His single appearance at the Le Mans-Bugatti circuit resulted in an 11th-place finish.

In 1991, while waiting for Toyota's new sportscar programme to come on song, Lammers was in Japan to help Dome with the development of the Mugen-engined F102, their new F3000 car. Rewarded with a one-off race outing at Suzuka, he finished third in his single appearance in the All-Nippon F3000 Championship.

More F3000 followed in 1993 after his Formula One deal with March failed to materialise. After accepting an offer to join the Italian Il Barone Rampante team to follow in the footsteps of Rubens Barrichello, Lammers finished fourth at Enna as his best result before the team was forced to close shop before the end of the season.

Two years later, Lammers returned to F3000 as he joined the Vortex team owned by Dutch transport magnate Henny Vollenberg. He won the F3000 South African GP at Kyalami, beating Kenny Bräck and teammate Tarso Marques, and competed in three more European rounds before quitting the team when key staff decided to leave.

=== Macau GP ===
Making a surprise return to Formula 3, Lammers joined the Macau GP grid in 1985, racing a Ralt-Volkswagen RT30 for Intersport Racing, where he qualifed and finished in third. In 1986, he repeated the trick with Murray Taylor Racing's similar Ralt, again finishing third. Returning to Intersport in 1987, Lammers finished in second place in their Ralt-Toyota RT31, storming up from 11th on the grid, while his final Macau appearance comes in 1988, again with Intersport. This time, he drove his Ralt-Toyota RT32 up to sixth from 17th on the grid.

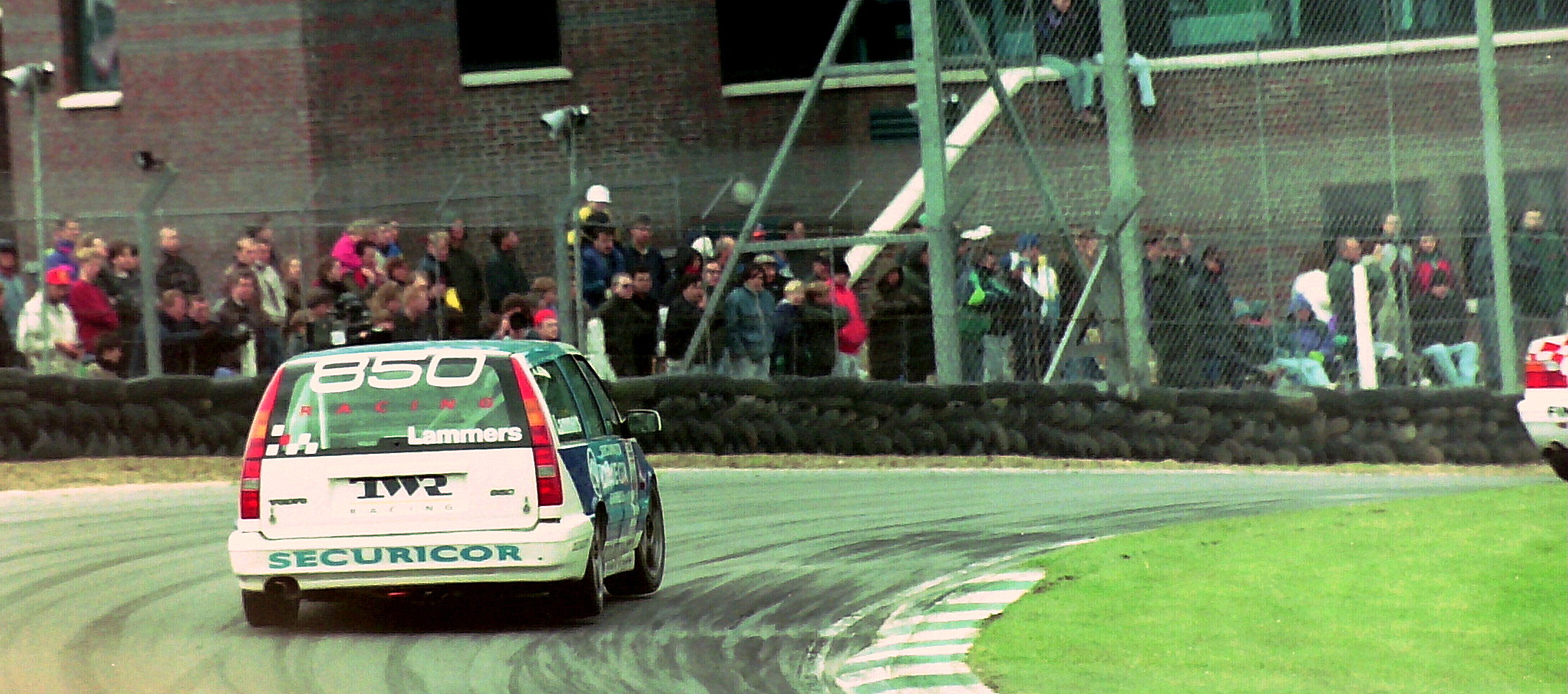
Lammers turning the Volvo 850 Estate into Clark Curve at Brands Hatch

=== BTCC ===
After his 1993 season, Lammers joined the BTCC within its Super Touring era. Teaming with his old colleagues from TWR, he became a teammate to Rickard Rydell in a pair of Volvo 850 SE cars. In this car, Lammers finished no higher than fifth.

== One-make series ==
=== BMW Procar ===
In 1980, during his time at ATS and Ensign, Lammers took part in the second season of the BMW M1 Procar Series that was run on Grand Prix weekends, with several Grand Prix drivers such as Jones, Lauda, Pironi and Piquet being part of the show. Lammers won the opening race at Donington Park, finished second at Avus and the Norisring, started from pole position at Monaco and was the title favourite until Hans-Joachim Stuck drove him off the track at Imola.

=== Renault 5 Turbo Cup ===
In his final Formula One season, Lammers became a regular in the European Renault 5 Turbo Cup, representing Renault Netherlands and taking home one win. He continued in the series in 1983 to take four wins and the championship, and repeated the trick in even more dominant fashion in 1984, winning eight races on his way to the title.

=== Grand Prix Masters ===
In 2005 and 2006, the Grand Prix Masters were set up as a one-make motor racing series featuring retired Formula One drivers. Lammers took part in the sole event of 2005, finishing ninth at Kyalami, and also raced in both 2006 events, taking seventh at Losail and retiring from the race at Silverstone.

=== VW Scirocco R-Cup ===
Having already retired as a full-time professional driver, Lammers competed as a guest driver in four races across three seasons (2010, 2011 and 2013) of the VW Scirocco R-Cup, with ninth in the 2013 Hockenheim round as his best result.

== Other appearances ==
=== Rallies ===
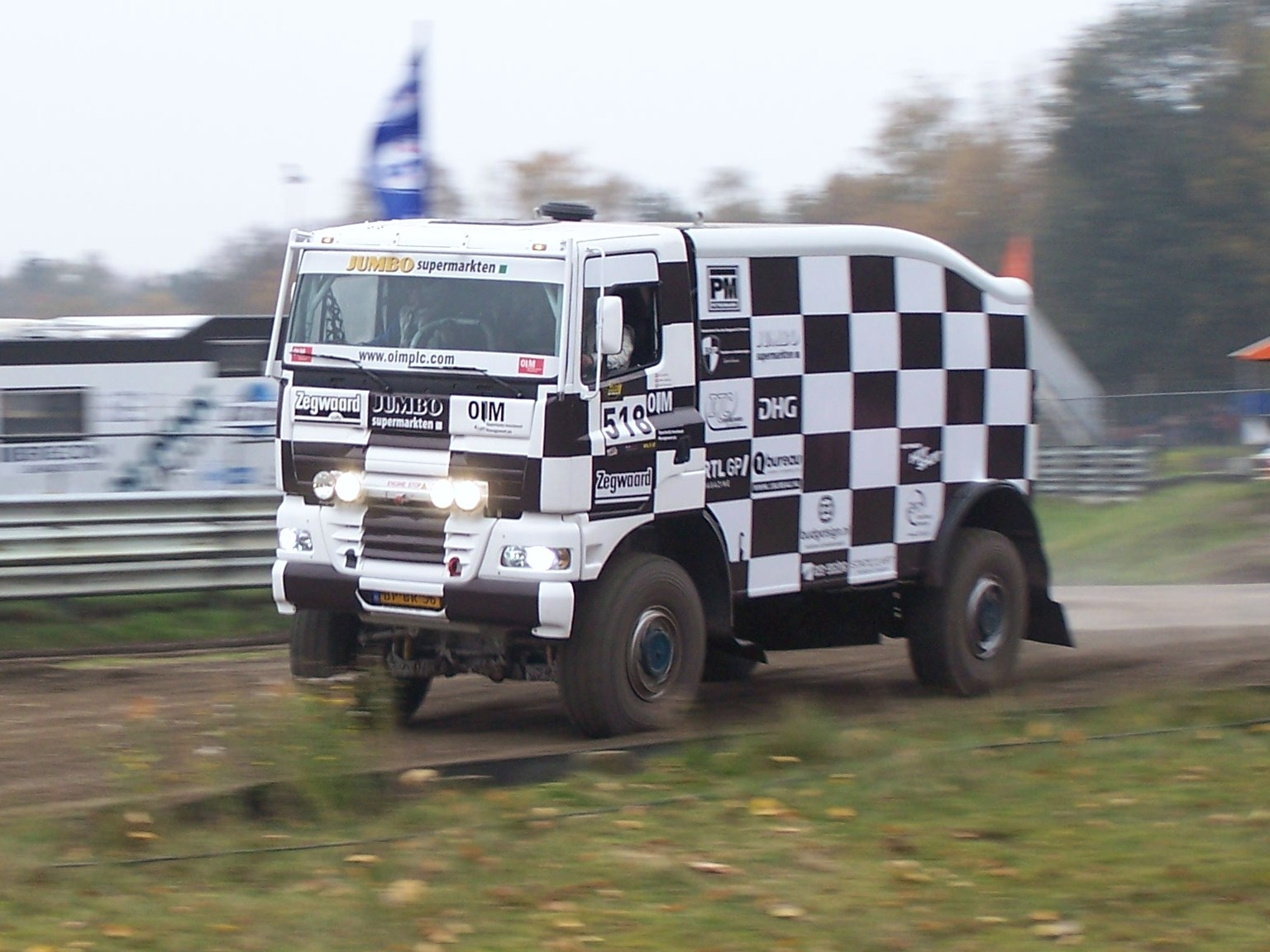
Racing for Holland's familiar chequered-flag livery returned for Lammers' Dakar adventure

In 1979, Lammers competed in the Dutch Tulpenrallye, driving for the Opel Dealer Team. Over two decades later, he was invited to join Frits van Eerd's new Dakar Rally enterprise in 2010. In the first of five Dakar outings in the Ginaf X2222 4x4 truck, Lammers failed to finish, before returning in the Ginaf works team in 2011, finishing 19th, and three more years with his own Ginaf-supported team, with 25th place in 2013 as his best result. In 2012, Lammers revived the chequered Racing for Holland livery for a sponsorship concept similar to the one he explored in the previous decade.

== Team principal ==
Next to his career as a professional racing driver, Lammers has acted as the team principal of his own team on three very different occasions.

=== Vitaal Racing ===
Between 1989 and 1991, Lammers ran his Opel Dealerteam Holland-supported Vitaal Racing outfit in Formula Opel Lotus. In his first year, he joined forces with Marlboro Challenge winner Peter Kox, and together they won the EFDA Opel Lotus Euroseries as well as the Benelux series. In 1990, Lammers took on another Marlboro Challenge winner, as Marcel Albers was promoted from Formula Ford, resulting in sixth in the final European standings.

=== Racing for Holland ===
Setting up Racing for Holland at the start of the 21st century proved to be the birth of Lammers' final period of sportscar success at the highest level. With their Dome-Judd S101, Racing for Holland won two consecutive titles in the FIA Sportscar Championship in 2002 and 2003 and continued with the Dome until 2007. Lammers later revived the Racing for Holland moniker – and a similar sponsorship scheme – for three of his Dakar outings in the following decade.

=== A1GP ===
Not known as Racing for Holland as such, the team was the seatholder for the Netherlands in the A1 Grand Prix series that runs between 2005 and 2009. Lammers started off with Jos Verstappen as his driver, who took victory at Durban in the opening 2005–06 season, while Jeroen Bleekemolen acted as the team's reserve driver. Bleekemolen stepped up into the leading role for in 2006–07, winning the Beijing street race, as Renger van der Zande took his place as a backup driver, himself taking part in three races. Bleekemolen continued in 2007–08, now supported by Arie Luyendyk Jr. Ditching its cheap Avon-shod Lola-Zytek chassis for pukka Michelin-tyred Ferrari cars, the A1GP organisation went into bankruptcy in a final 2008–09 season in which Robert Doornbos and Jeroen Bleekemolen took turns at the wheel, each winning a sprint race on their way to fourth for the Netherlands in the final standings.

== New responsibilities ==
=== Dutch GP ===
After his decision to go into full retirement after the 2019 season, Lammers became the sporting director of the organisation founded to revive the Dutch GP at Zandvoort, which was revived in 2021.

== Personal life ==
Lammers has two children from his marriage with Fardous Hashem.

Currently, Lammers is in a relationship since 2001 with Mariska Hoyinck. Together they have a son, René.

Lammers' youngest son René Lammers is currently competing in single seaters. The 16-year-old is a frontrunner in the 2025 F4 Spanish Championship, having both won the Karting European Championship and finished runner-up in the Karting World Championship in the OK Category in 2023.

== Racing record ==
=== Complete Formula One World Championship results ===
(key)

Year	Entrant	Chassis	Engine	1	2	3	4	5	6	7	8	9	10	11	12	13	14	15	16	WDC	Pts
1979	Samson Shadow Racing	Shadow DN9	Ford Cosworth DFV 3.0 V8	ARG; Ret	BRA; 14	RSA; Ret	USW; Ret	ESP; 12	BEL; 10	MON; DNQ	FRA; 18	GBR; 11	GER; 10	AUT; Ret	NED; Ret	ITA; DNQ	CAN; 9	USA; DNQ		NC	0
1980	Team ATS	ATS D3	Ford Cosworth DFV 3.0 V8	ARG; DNQ	BRA; DNQ	RSA; DNQ														NC	0
1980	Team ATS	ATS D4	Ford Cosworth DFV 3.0 V8				USW; Ret	BEL; 12	MON; NC											NC	0
1980	Unipart Racing Team	Ensign N180	Ford Cosworth DFV 3.0 V8							FRA; DNQ	GBR; DNQ	GER; 14	AUT; DNQ	NED; DNQ	ITA; DNQ	CAN; 12	USA; Ret			NC	0
1981	Team ATS	ATS D4	Ford Cosworth DFV 3.0 V8	USW; Ret	BRA; DNQ	ARG; 12	SMR; DNQ	BEL	MON	ESP	FRA	GBR	GER	AUT	NED	ITA	CAN	CPL		NC	0
1982	Theodore Racing Team	Theodore TY02	Ford Cosworth DFV 3.0 V8	RSA	BRA	USW	SMR	BEL; DNQ	MON; DNQ	DET; DNQ	CAN	NED; Ret	GBR; DNQ	FRA; DNQ	GER	AUT	SUI	ITA	CPL	NC	0
1992	March F1	March CG911	Ilmor 2175A 3.5 V10	RSA	MEX	BRA	ESP	SMR	MON	CAN	FRA	GBR	GER	HUN	BEL	ITA	POR	JPN; Ret	AUS; 12	NC	0

=== Complete World Sportscar Championship results ===
(key) (Races in bold indicate pole position) (Races in italics indicate fastest lap)

Year	Entrant	Class	Car	Engine	1	2	3	4	5	6	7	8	9	10	11	Pos.	Pts
1979	Zakspeed Racing	Gr.5	Ford Capri Turbo	Ford 1.4 L4t	DAY	MUG	DIJ	SIL	NÜR; Ret	PER	GLN	BRH	VAL			(Note: No drivers' Championship.)	
1983	GTi Engineering	C	Porsche 956	Porsche Type-935 2.6 F6t	MNZ; 6	SIL; 3	NÜR; 3	LMS; 8	SPA; 9	FUJ	KYA; 5					7th	43
1984	GTi Engineering	C1	Porsche 956	Porsche Type-935 2.6 F6t	MNZ; 5	SIL; 5	LMS; Ret	NÜR; 4	BRH; 1	MOS						6th	75
1984	GTi Engineering	C1	Porsche 956 GTi	Porsche Type-935 2.6 F6t							SPA; Ret	IMO; 2	FUJ; 9	KYA	SAN; 3	6th	75
1985	GTi Engineering	C1	Porsche 956 GTi	Porsche Type-935 2.6 F6t	MUG	MNZ; 5	SIL; 5	LMS	HOC	MOS	SPA					26th	16
1985	TWR Jaguar	C1	Jaguar XJR-6	Jaguar 6.2 V12								BRH; Ret	FUJ	SHA; 2		26th	16
1986	Silk Cut Jaguar	C1	Jaguar XJR-6	Jaguar 6.5 V12	MNZ	SIL	LMS	NOR	BRH	JER; 3	NÜR; Ret	SPA; 2	FUJ; 17			19th	27
1987	Silk Cut Jaguar	C1	Jaguar XJR-8	Jaguar 7.0 V12	JAR; 1	JER; Ret	MNZ; 1	SIL; 2		NOR; Ret	**BRH**; 3	NÜR; Ret	SPA; 2	FUJ; 1		2nd	102
1987	Silk Cut Jaguar	C1	Jaguar XJR-8	Jaguar 6.9 V12					LMS; Ret							2nd	102
1988	Silk Cut Jaguar	C1	Jaguar XJR-9	Jaguar 7.0 V12	JER; Ret	JAR; Ret	MNZ; Ret	SIL; Ret	LMS; 1	BRN; 3	BRH; Ret	NÜR; 8	SPA; 2	FUJ; Ret	SAN; 4	10th	118
1989	Silk Cut Jaguar	C1	Jaguar XJR-9	Jaguar 7.0 V12	SUZ; Ret	DIJ; Ret	JAR; 2					MEX; 6				8th	30
1989	Silk Cut Jaguar	C1	Jaguar XJR-11	Jaguar JV6 3.5 V6t				**BRH**; 5	NÜR; 10	DON; Ret	SPA; Ret					8th	30
1990	Silk Cut Jaguar	C1	Jaguar XJR-11	Jaguar JV6 3.5 V6t	SUZ; Ret	MNZ; 4	SIL; 2	SPA; 2	DIJ; 4	NÜR; 4	DON; DSQ	CGV; 15	MEX; Ret			7th	21
1992	Toyota Team Tom's	C1	Toyota TS010	Toyota RV10 3.5 V10	MNZ; Ret	SIL; Ret	LMS; 5	DON; Ret	SUZ; 2	MAG; 3						6th	35

Footnotes

=== 24 Hours of Le Mans results ===
Year	Team	Co-Drivers	Car	Class	Laps	Pos.	Class Pos.
1983	(United Kingdom) Canon Racing (United Kingdom) GTi Engineering	(United Kingdom) Jonathan Palmer (United Kingdom) Richard Lloyd	Porsche 956	C	339	8th	8th
1984	(United Kingdom) GTi Engineering	(United Kingdom) Jonathan Palmer	Porsche 956	C1	239	DNF	DNF
1987	(United Kingdom) Silk Cut Jaguar (United Kingdom) Tom Walkinshaw Racing	(United States) Eddie Cheever (Brazil) Raul Boesel	Jaguar XJR-8LM	C1	325	5th	5th
1988	(United Kingdom) Silk Cut Jaguar (United Kingdom) Tom Walkinshaw Racing	(United Kingdom) Johnny Dumfries (United Kingdom) Andy Wallace	Jaguar XJR-9LM	C1	394	**1st**	**1st**
1989	(United Kingdom) Silk Cut Jaguar (United Kingdom) Tom Walkinshaw Racing	(France) Patrick Tambay (United Kingdom) Andrew Gilbert-Scott	Jaguar XJR-9LM	C1	380	4th	4th
1990	(United Kingdom) Silk Cut Jaguar (United Kingdom) Tom Walkinshaw Racing	(United Kingdom) Andy Wallace (Austria) Franz Konrad	Jaguar XJR-12	C1	355	**2nd**	**2nd**
1992	(Japan) Toyota Team Tom's	(United Kingdom) Andy Wallace (Italy) Teo Fabi	Toyota TS010	C1	331	8th	5th
1993	(Japan) Toyota Team Tom's	(United Kingdom) Geoff Lees (Argentina) Juan Manuel Fangio II	Toyota TS010	C1	353	8th	5th
1996	(France) Courage Compétition	(United States) Mario Andretti (United Kingdom) Derek Warwick	Courage C36-Porsche	LMP1	315	13th	**3rd**
1997	(United Kingdom) GT1 Lotus Racing	(Netherlands) Mike Hezemans (Germany) Alexander Grau	Lotus Elise GT1	GT1	121	DNF	DNF
1998	(Japan) Nissan Motorsports (United Kingdom) TWR	(France) Érik Comas (Italy) Andrea Montermini	Nissan R390 GT1	GT1	342	6th	6th
1999	(Germany) Konrad Motorsport (Netherlands) Talkline Racing for Holland	(Netherlands) Peter Kox (Netherlands) Tom Coronel	Lola B98/10-Ford	LMP	213	DNF	DNF
2000	(Germany) Konrad Motorsport (Netherlands) Racing for Holland	(Netherlands) Tom Coronel (Netherlands) Peter Kox	Lola B2K/10-Ford	LMP900	38	DNF	DNF
2001	(Netherlands) Racing for Holland	(Netherlands) Donny Crevels (Belgium) Val Hillebrand	Dome S101-Judd	LMP900	156	DNF	DNF
2002	(Netherlands) Racing for Holland	(Netherlands) Tom Coronel (Belgium) Val Hillebrand	Dome S101-Judd	LMP900	351	9th	8th
2003	(Netherlands) Racing for Holland	(Netherlands) John Bosch (United Kingdom) Andy Wallace	Dome S101-Judd	LMP900	360	6th	4th
2004	(Netherlands) Racing for Holland	(United States) Chris Dyson (Japan) Katsutomo Kaneishi	Dome S101-Judd	LMP1	341	7th	6th
2005	(Netherlands) Racing for Holland	(United States) Elton Julian (Netherlands) John Bosch	Dome S101-Judd	LMP1	346	7th	5th
2006	(Netherlands) Racing for Holland	(Malaysia) Alex Yoong (Sweden) Stefan Johansson	Dome S101Hb-Judd	LMP1	182	DNF	DNF
2007	(Netherlands) Racing for Holland	(Netherlands) Jeroen Bleekemolen (Netherlands) David Hart	Dome S101.5-Judd	LMP1	305	25th	8th
2008	(Czech Republic) Charouz Racing System (United States) Team Cytosport	(United States) Greg Pickett (Germany) Klaus Graf	Lola B07/17-Judd	LMP1	146	DNF	DNF
2011	(Switzerland) Hope Racing	(Switzerland) Steve Zacchia (Denmark) Casper Elgaard	Oreca 01-Swiss HyTech	LMP1	115	DNF	DNF
2017	(Netherlands) Racing Team Nederland	(Brazil) Rubens Barrichello (Netherlands) Frits van Eerd	Dallara P217-Gibson	LMP2	344	13th	11th
2018	(Netherlands) Racing Team Nederland	(Netherlands) Giedo van der Garde (Netherlands) Frits van Eerd	Dallara P217-Gibson	LMP2	356	11th	7th

=== 24 Hours of Daytona ===
(key)

24 Hours of Daytona results
Year	Class	No	Team	Car	Co-drivers	Laps	Pos.	Class
1986	GTP	68	(United States) B.F. Goodrich	Porsche 962	(United Kingdom) Derek Warwick (United States) John Morton	512	12 ^{DNF}	5 ^{DNF}
1988	GTP	61	(United Kingdom) Castrol Jaguar Racing	Jaguar XJR-9D	(United States) Danny Sullivan (United States) Davy Jones	512	26 ^{DNF}	10 ^{DNF}
1988	GTP	60	(United Kingdom) Castrol Jaguar Racing	Jaguar XJR-9D	(United Kingdom) Martin Brundle (Brazil) Raul Boesel (Denmark) John Nielsen	728	1	1
1989	GTP	60	(United Kingdom) Castrol Jaguar Racing	Jaguar XJR-9	(United States) Davy Jones (Brazil) Raul Boesel	288	43 ^{DNF}	15 ^{DNF}
1990	GTP	61	(United Kingdom) Castrol Jaguar Racing	Jaguar XJR-12D	(United States) Davy Jones (United Kingdom) Andy Wallace	761	1	1
1995	WSC	9	(United States) Auto Toy Store Inc.	Spice SE90-Chevrolet	(United Kingdom) Derek Bell (United Kingdom) Andy Wallace	100	64 ^{DNF}	15 ^{DNF}
1999	CA	32	(Germany) Konrad Motorsport	Lola B98/10-Lotus	(Austria) Franz Konrad (Italy) Vincenzo Sospiri	43	71 ^{DNF}	21 ^{DNF}
2000	SR	31	(Germany) Konrad Motorsport	Lola B98/10-Ford	(Austria) Franz Konrad (Germany) Sascha Maassen	209	63 ^{DNF}	12 ^{DNF}
2002	SRP	2	(United States) Crawford Racing	Crawford SSC2K-Judd	(United Kingdom) Johnny Mowlem (United States) Tony Stewart	346	46 ^{DNF}	11 ^{DNF}
2004	DP	27	(United States) Doran Lista Racing	Doran JE4-Lexus	(Belgium) Didier Theys (Belgium) Marc Goossens (Switzerland) Fredy Lienhard	521	4	2
2005	DP	20	(United States) CITGO - Howard - Boss Motorsports	Crawford DP03-Pontiac	(United Kingdom) Andy Wallace (United States) Tony Stewart	699	3	3
2006	DP	2	(United States) Howard-Boss Motorsports	Crawford DP03-Pontiac	(United States) Danica Patrick (United Kingdom) Allan McNish (United States) Rusty Wallace	273	50 ^{DNF}	24 ^{DNF}

=== PPG Indycar Series ===
(key)

Year	Team	No.	Chassis	Engine	1	2	3	4	5	6	7	8	9	10	11	12	13	14	15	16	17	Pos.	Pts	Ref
1985	AMI Racing	43	March 85C	Ford Cosworth DFX	LBH	INDY	MIL	POR; 16	MEA; 12	CLE; DNS	MCH	ROA	POC	MOH	SAN	MCH						26th	11	
1985	Forsythe Racing	33	Lola T900	Ford Cosworth DFX													LAG; 5	PHX; 20	MIA; 13			26th	11	
1986	Curb-Agajanian Racing	98	Eagle 86GC	Ford Cosworth DFX	PHX; 9	LBH; 14	INDY; DNQ	MIL	POR	MEA	CLE	TOR	MCH	POC	MOH	SAN	MCH	ROA				22nd	13	
1986	Machinists Union Racing	59	Eagle 86GC	Ford Cosworth DFX															LAG; 8	PHX; 23	MIA; 9	22nd	13	

==== Indianapolis 500 ====
Year	Chassis	Engine	Start	Finish	Team
1986	Eagle	Ford-Cosworth	DNQ		Curb-Agajanian Racing

=== Complete European Formula Two Championship results ===
(key)

Year	Entrant	Chassis	Engine	1	2	3	4	5	6	7	8	9	10	11	12	Pos.	Pts
1980	March Racing Ltd	March 802	BMW	THR	HOC	NÜR	VAL	PAU	SIL	ZOL	MUG	ZAN; Ret	PER	MIS	HOC	NC	0

=== Complete International Formula 3000 results ===
(key)

Year	Entrant	Chassis	Engine	1	2	3	4	5	6	7	8	9	10	11	Pos.	Pts
1986	Jordan Racing	March 86B	Cosworth	SIL	VAL	PAU	SPA	IMO	MUG	PER	ÖST	BIR	BUG; 11	JAR	NC	0
1993	Il Barone Rampante	Reynard 93D	Cosworth	DON; 9	SIL; 9	PAU; 10	PER; 4	HOC; 7	NÜR; Ret	SPA	MAG	NOG			15th	3
1995	Vortex Motorsport	Reynard 95D	Cosworth	SIL; 11	CAT; 10	PAU; 10	PER	HOC	SPA	EST	MAG				NC	0

=== Complete Japanese Formula 3000 Championship results ===
(key)

Year	Entrant	Chassis	Engine	1	2	3	4	5	6	7	8	9	10	11	DC	Pts
1987	Dome	March 87B	Cosworth	SUZ; 4	FUJ; 12	MIN	SUZ; 11	SUZ; 7	SUG						8th	34
1987	Dome	March 87B	Cosworth-Yamaha							FUJ; 1	SUZ	SUZ; Ret			8th	34
1991	Team LeMans	Dome F102	Mugen	SUZ; 3	AUT; 9	FUJ; 5	MIN; Ret	SUZ; 10	SUG; Ret	FUJ; 6	SUZ; Ret	FUJ; C	SUZ; 7	FUJ; Ret	11th	7

=== Complete British Touring Car Championship results ===
(key) (Races in bold indicate pole position) (Races in italics indicate fastest lap)

Year	Team	Car	1	2	3	4	5	6	7	8	9	10	11	12	13	14	15	16	17	18	19	20	21	DC	Pts
1994	Volvo 850 Racing	Volvo 850 SE/GLT	THR; 1 Ret	BRH; 1; 12	BRH; 2; 16	SNE; 1; 11	SIL; 1 Ret	SIL; 2; 16	OUL; 1; 13	DON; 1; 14	DON; 2; 15	BRH; 1; 7	BRH; 2; 16	SIL; 1; 12	KNO; 1 NC	KNO; 2; 12	OUL; 1; 7	BRH; 1; 9	BRH; 2; 5	SIL; 1; 16	SIL; 2; 17	DON; 1; 13	DON; 2; 16	15th	18

=== Complete FIA GT Championship results ===
(key)

Year	Team	Car	Class	1	2	3	4	5	6	7	8	9	10	11	Pos.	Pts
1997	GT1 Lotus Racing	Lotus Elise GT1	GT1	HOC; Ret	SIL; Ret	HEL	NÜR; 11	SPA; Ret	A1R; Ret	SUZ	DON; 17	MUG; 11	SEB; 11	LAG; 9	NC	0
1998	Team Hezemans	Bitter GT1	GT1	OSC	SIL; Ret	HOC; DNS	DIJ	HUN							NC	0
1998	Roock Racing	Porsche 911 GT2	GT2						SUZ; 7	DON	A1R				NC	0
1998	Konrad Motorsport	Porsche 911 GT2	GT2									HOM; Ret	LAG; Ret		NC	0
2008	IPB Spartak Racing	Lamborghini Murciélago R-GT	GT1	SIL	MNZ	ADR	OSC	SPA; 8	BUC	BUC	BRN	NOG	ZOL	SAN	31st	8

=== Complete European Le Mans Series results ===
(key)

Year	Entrant	Class	Chassis	Engine	1	2	3	4	5	6	Pos.	Pts
2005	Racing for Holland	LMP1	Dome S101	Judd GV4 4.0 V10	SPA	MNZ; 7	SIL; Ret	NÜR; 8	IST		30th	3
2006	Racing for Holland	LMP1	Dome S101Hb	Mugen MF408S 4.0 V8	IST; Ret	SPA					23rd	6
2006	Racing for Holland	LMP1	Dome S101Hb	Judd GV5 5.0 V10			NÜR; 3	DON	JAR		23rd	6
2007	Racing for Holland	LMP1	Dome S101.5	Judd GV5.5 S2 5.5 V10	MNZ; 8	VAL; Ret	NÜR; 7	SPA	SIL	INT	33rd	3
2008	Horag Racing	LMP2	Porsche RS Spyder Evo	Porsche MR6 3.4 V8	CAT; 6	MNZ; 3	SPA; 2	NÜR; 12	SIL; 2		5th	25
2017	Racing Team Nederland	LMP2	Dallara P217	Gibson GK428 4.2 V8	SIL; 11	MNZ; 10	RBR; 7	LEC; 12	SPA; 11	ALG; 8	17th	12.5

=== Complete Grand Prix Masters results ===
(key) Races in bold indicate pole position, races in italics indicate fastest lap.

Year	Team	Chassis	Engine	1	2	3	4	5
2005	Team LG	Delta Motorsport GPM	Nicholson McLaren 3.5 V8	RSA; 9				
2006	Team LG	Delta Motorsport GPM	Nicholson McLaren 3.5 V8	QAT; 7	ITA; C	GBR; Ret	MAL; C	RSA; C

=== Complete FIA World Endurance Championship results ===
(key)

Year	Entrant	Class	Chassis	Engine	1	2	3	4	5	6	7	8	Rank	Points
2018–19	Racing Team Nederland	LMP2	Dallara P217	Gibson GK428 4.2 V8	SPA; 7	LMS; 5	SIL	FUJ	SHA	SEB	SPA	LMS	14th	21

== Books ==
- Klis, Hans van der (2007, 3rd ed.), Dwars door de Tarzanbocht: de dertien Nederlandse Formule 1-coureurs. Amsterdam, pp. 98–115, ISBN 9789046700495.
- Koense, Mark (2020). Jan Lammers, De biografie van een leven met 300 km/h. Amgini Autosport Store, 2020, no ISBN.

Sporting positions
Preceded by Piercarlo Ghinzani	European Formula 3 Championship; Champion; 1978	Succeeded by Alain Prost
Preceded by Joël Gouhier	Coupe d'Europe Renault 5 Turbo; Champion; 1983-1984	Succeeded by Oscar Larrauri
Preceded by Derek Bell; Hans-Joachim Stuck; Al Holbert	Winner of the 24 Hours of Le Mans; 1988; With: Johnny Dumfries & Andy Wallace	Succeeded by Jochen Mass; Manuel Reuter; Stanley Dickens
Preceded by Marco Zadra	FIA Sportscar Championship; Champion; 2002-2003; With: Val Hillebrand (2002) & John Bosch (2003)	Succeeded by None (Series ended)
