= 1978 FIA European Formula 3 Championship =

Open-wheel motor race series

Seasons
- ← 1977 1979 →

The 1978 European Formula Three Championship was the fourth FIA European Formula 3 Championship season, contested over 16 rounds.

Jan Lammers of the Netherlands won the drivers championship with 72 points. Points were awarded in 9-6-4-3-2-1 fashion to the first six finishers. The four worst results were discarded.

== Schedule ==
Round	Circuit	Date
1	(Netherlands) Circuit Park Zandvoort, Zandvoort	27 March
2	(West Germany) Nürburgring, Nürburg	2 April
3	(Austria) Österreichring, Spielberg	16 April
4	(Belgium) Circuit Zolder, Heusden-Zolder	23 April
5	(Italy) Autodromo Dino Ferrari, Imola	14 May
6	(West Germany) Nürburgring, Nürburg	28 May
7	(France) Dijon-Prenois, Dijon	4 June
8	(Italy) Autodromo Nazionale Monza, Monza	25 June
9	(Italy) Autodromo di Pergusa, Pergusa	2 July
10	(France) Circuit de Nevers Magny-Cours, Magny-Cours	16 July
11	(Sweden) Ring Knutstorp, Kågeröd	6 August
12	(Sweden) Karlskoga Motorstadion, Karlskoga	13 August
13	(United Kingdom) Donington Park, Leicestershire	26 August
14	(West Germany) Kassel-Calden Circuit, Kassel	3 September
15	(Spain) Circuito del Jarama, Madrid	17 September
16	(Italy) ACI Vallelunga Circuit, Campagnano di Roma	8 October

== Results ==
Round	Circuit	Pole position	Fastest lap	Winning driver	Winning team	Report
1	(Netherlands) Circuit Park Zandvoort	(Netherlands) Michael Bleekemolen	(Netherlands) Arie Luyendijk	(Netherlands) Jan Lammers	Racing Team Holland	Report
2	(West Germany) Nürburgring	(Italy) Teo Fabi	(Netherlands) Jan Lammers	(Sweden) Anders Olofsson	Strike Up Racing Team	Report
3	(Austria) Österreichring	(Sweden) Anders Olofsson	(Sweden) Anders Olofsson	(Sweden) Anders Olofsson	Strike Up Racing Team	Report
4	(Belgium) Circuit Zolder	(Netherlands) Michael Bleekemolen	(Italy) Teo Fabi	(Italy) Teo Fabi	Astra Racing Team	Report
5	(Italy) Autodromo Dino Ferrari	(Sweden) Anders Olofsson	(Sweden) Anders Olofsson	(France) Patrick Gaillard	Chevron Racing Team	Report
6	(West Germany) Nürburgring	(Sweden) Anders Olofsson	(Netherlands) Jan Lammers	(France) Patrick Gaillard	Chevron Racing Team	Report
7	(France) Dijon-Prenois	(Netherlands) Jan Lammers	(Italy) Teo Fabi	(Italy) Teo Fabi	Astra Racing Team	Report
8	(Italy) Autodromo Nazionale Monza	(Italy) Siegfried Stohr	(Italy) Daniele Albertin	(Netherlands) Jan Lammers	Racing Team Holland	Report
9	(Italy) Autodromo di Pergusa	(Italy) Siegfried Stohr	(Italy) Siegfried Stohr	(Netherlands) Michael Bleekemolen	Chevron Racing Team	Report
10	(France) Circuit de Nevers Magny-Cours	(Netherlands) Jan Lammers	(Netherlands) Jan Lammers	(Netherlands) Jan Lammers	Racing Team Holland	Report
11	(Sweden) Ring Knutstorp	(Sweden) Anders Olofsson	(Sweden) Anders Olofsson	(Sweden) Anders Olofsson	Strike Up Racing Team	Report
12	(Sweden) Karlskoga Motorstadion	(Sweden) Anders Olofsson	(Netherlands) Jan Lammers	(Netherlands) Jan Lammers	Racing Team Holland	Report
13	(United Kingdom) Donington Park	(United Kingdom) Derek Warwick	(Netherlands) Jan Lammers	(United Kingdom) Derek Warwick	Warwick Trailers	Report
14	(West Germany) Kassel-Calden Circuit	(Italy) Teo Fabi	(Sweden) Anders Olofsson	(Sweden) Anders Olofsson	Strike Up Racing Team	Report
15	(Spain) Circuito del Jarama	(France) Alain Prost	(France) Alain Prost	(France) Alain Prost	Ecurie Elf	Report
16	(Italy) ACI Vallelunga Circuit	(Italy) Siegfried Stohr	(Italy) Teo Fabi	(Italy) Teo Fabi	Astra Racing Team	Report

== Season standings ==
=== Drivers standings ===
For every race 9 points were awarded to the winner, 6 to the runner up, 4 for third place, 3 for fourth place, 2 for fifth place and 1 for sixth place. No additional points were awarded.

Four scores were dropped. Dropped scores are shown in parentheses.

Although Jan Lammers and Anders Olofsson tied on points and tied on four wins each, Lammers took the championship by virtue of scoring five second places to Olofsson's three.

Pos.	Driver	ZAN (Netherlands)	NÜR (West Germany)	OST (Austria)	ZOL (Belgium)	IMO (Italy)	NÜR (West Germany)	DIJ (France)	MNZ (Italy)	PER (Italy)	MAG (France)	KNU (Sweden)	KAR (Sweden)	DON (United Kingdom)	KAS (West Germany)	JAR (Spain)	VAL (Italy)	Points
1	(Netherlands) Jan Lammers	9	(1)	2	-	1	6	6	9	-	9	6	9	6	6	2	-	71 (72)
=	(Sweden) Anders Olofsson	3	9	9	6	4	-	4	-	4	-	9	6	2	9	6	-	71
3	(France) Patrick Gaillard	2	-	4	1	9	9	-	6	6	6	-	1	-	1	3	-	48
4	(Italy) Teo Fabi	4	6	-	9	-	-	9	-	-	4	-	4	-	-	-	9	45
5	(Netherlands) Michael Bleekemolen	6	3	6	4	-	-	2	-	9	-	-	-	-	-	-	-	30
6	(United Kingdom) Derek Warwick	-	-	-	-	-	-	-	-	-	-	-	-	9	-	4	-	13
=	(Republic of Ireland) David Kennedy	-	4	-	-	-	3	-	-	-	2	-	-	4	-	-	-	13
8	(Italy) Daniele Albertin	-	2	3	3	-	-	-	-	-	-	-	-	-	4	-	-	12
9	(France) Alain Prost	-	-	-	-	-	-	-	-	-	-	-	-	1	-	9	-	10
=	(Italy) Guido Pardini	-	-	-	-	3	-	-	-	1	-	-	-	-	-	-	6	10
11	(Italy) Roberto Campominosi	-	-	-	-	6	-	-	-	2	-	-	-	-	-	-	1	9
=	(Netherlands) Arie Luyendyk	1	-	1	2	-	2	-	-	-	1	2	-	-	-	-	-	9
13	(Sweden) Slim Borgudd	-	-	-	-	-	-	-	-	-	-	4	2	-	-	-	-	6
=	(Italy) Eddy Bianchi	-	-	-	-	-	-	-	-	3	-	-	-	-	-	-	3	6
15	(United States) Bobby Rahal	-	-	-	-	-	4	-	1	-	-	-	-	-	-	-	-	5
16	(Switzerland) Marzio Romano	-	-	-	-	-	-	-	4	-	-	-	-	-	-	-	-	4
=	(Italy) Mauro Baldi	-	-	-	-	-	-	-	-	-	-	-	-	-	-	-	4	4
=	(Denmark) John Nielsen	-	-	-	-	-	1	3	-	-	-	-	-	-	-	-	-	4
=	(Netherlands) Huub Rothengatter	-	-	-	-	-	-	-	2	-	-	-	-	-	2	-	-	4
20	(Italy) Enzo Coloni	-	-	-	-	-	-	-	3	-	-	-	-	-	-	-	-	3
=	(France) Jean-Louis Schlesser	-	-	-	-	-	-	-	-	-	3	-	-	-	-	-	-	3
=	(France) Jacques Coulon	-	-	-	-	-	-	-	-	-	-	3	-	-	-	-	-	3
=	(Sweden) Eje Elgh	-	-	-	-	-	-	-	-	-	-	-	3	-	-	-	-	3
=	(Italy) Andrea de Cesaris	-	-	-	-	-	-	-	-	-	-	-	-	3	-	-	-	3
=	(Germany) Jochen Dauer	-	-	-	-	-	-	-	-	-	-	-	-	-	3	-	-	3
=	(Switzerland) Bruno Pescia	-	-	-	-	2	-	1	-	-	-	-	-	-	-	-	-	3
27	(Italy) Fillipo Niccolini	-	-	-	-	-	-	-	-	-	-	-	-	-	-	-	2	2
28	(Sweden) Ulf Svensson	-	-	-	-	-	-	-	-	-	-	1	-	-	-	-	-	1
=	(Spain) Jorge Caton	-	-	-	-	-	-	-	-	-	-	-	-	-	-	1	-	1
Pos.	Driver	ZAN (Netherlands)	NÜR (West Germany)	OST (Austria)	ZOL (Belgium)	IMO (Italy)	NÜR (West Germany)	DIJ (France)	MNZ (Italy)	PER (Italy)	MAG (France)	KNU (Sweden)	KAR (Sweden)	DON (United Kingdom)	KAS (West Germany)	JAR (Spain)	VAL (Italy)	Points
