= 1976 FIA European Formula 3 Championship =

Open-wheel motor race series

Seasons
- ← 1975 1977 →

The 1976 FIA European Formula 3 Championship was the second edition of the FIA European Formula 3 Championship. The championship consisted of 10 rounds across the continent. The season was won by Italian driver Riccardo Patrese who competed for Trivellato Racing Team. He had the same number of points and wins with Conny Andersson after their one worst point results were dropped, but had more total score than Anderson. The third place in the drivers' standings was taken by Gianfranco Brancatelli, who was the only other driver to win the race.

== Calendar ==
Round	Circuit	Date
1	(West Germany) Nürburgring, Nürburg	4 April
2	(Netherlands) Circuit Park Zandvoort, Zandvoort	19 April
3	(Sweden) Mantorp Park, Mantorp	9 May
4	(West Germany) AVUS, Berlin	23 May
5	(Italy) Autodromo di Pergusa, Pergusa	13 June
6	(Italy) Autodromo Nazionale Monza, Monza	27 June
7	(France) Circuit de Croix-en-Ternois, Croix-en-Ternois	25 July
8	(West Germany) Kassel-Calden Circuit, Kassel	22 August
9	(Sweden) Ring Knutstorp, Kågeröd	5 September
10	(Italy) ACI Vallelunga Circuit, Campagnano di Roma	4 October

== Results ==
Round	Circuit	Pole position	Fastest lap	Winning driver	Winning team
1	(West Germany) Nürburgring	(West Germany) Rudolf Dötsch	(Italy) Gianfranco Brancatelli	(Sweden) Conny Andersson	March Engineering
2	(Netherlands) Circuit Park Zandvoort	(Italy) Riccardo Patrese	(Italy) Gianfranco Brancatelli	(Italy) Riccardo Patrese	Trivellato Racing Team
3	(Sweden) Mantorp Park	(Sweden) Conny Andersson	(Italy) Riccardo Patrese	(Italy) Gianfranco Brancatelli	Scuderia Everest
4	(West Germany) AVUS	(Sweden) Conny Andersson	not recorded	(Sweden) Conny Andersson	March Engineering
5	(Italy) Autodromo di Pergusa	(Italy) Gianfranco Brancatelli	(Sweden) Conny Andersson	(Italy) Riccardo Patrese	Trivellato Racing Team
6	(Italy) Autodromo Nazionale Monza	(Sweden) Conny Andersson	(Italy) Riccardo Patrese	(Italy) Riccardo Patrese	Trivellato Racing Team
7	(France) Circuit de Croix-en-Ternois	(Sweden) Conny Andersson	(Sweden) Conny Andersson	(Sweden) Conny Andersson	March Engineering
8	(West Germany) Kassel-Calden Circuit	(Italy) Gianfranco Brancatelli	not recorded	(Italy) Riccardo Patrese	Trivellato Racing Team
9	(Sweden) Ring Knutstorp	(Denmark) Jac Nellemann	(Sweden) Conny Andersson	(Sweden) Conny Andersson	March Engineering
10	(Italy) ACI Vallelunga Circuit	(Italy) Gianfranco Brancatelli	(Italy) Alessandro Pesenti-Rossi	(Italy) Gianfranco Brancatelli	Scuderia Everest

== Championship standings ==
Pos	Driver	NÜR (Germany)	ZAN (Netherlands)	MAN (Sweden)	AVUS (Germany)	PER (Italy)	MNZ (Italy)	CRT (France)	KAS (Germany)	KNT (Sweden)	VLL (Italy)	Pts
1	(Italy) Riccardo Patrese	3	1	2	20	1	1	3	1	DNQ	2	52
2	(Sweden) Conny Andersson	1	DNS	5	1	2	2	1	3	1	DNQ	52
3	(Italy) Gianfranco Brancatelli	Ret	4	1	4	Ret	Ret	2	2	4	1	36
4	(Germany) Bertram Schäfer	2	9	DNQ	3	DNS	DNQ	5	Ret			14
5	(Switzerland) Marc Surer	5	3	Ret	18			DNQ	7	5	4	13
6	(Italy) Piercarlo Ghinzani		19			3	Ret		4		3	11
7	(Sweden) Ulf Svensson	DNS	6	6	2		14	DNQ	16	Ret	Ret	7
8	(Denmark) Jac Nellemann		Ret	7	12			Ret	6	2		7
9	(Sweden) Clas Sigurdsson	4	7	3				9	8	10	12	7
10	(Denmark) Thorkild Thyrring							10	5	3		6
11	(Italy) Giuseppe Bossoni	6	5			8	5				Ret	6
12	(Sweden) Hakan Alriksson		8	4	6			DNQ	9	DNQ		5
13	(Germany) Wolfgang Klein		2	12			DNQ	DNQ		DNQ		4
14	(Netherlands) Boy Hayje		24				3	7				4
15	(Italy) Francesco Campaci	Ret	13	Ret		4	Ret					3
16	(Italy) Gaudenzio Mantova	DNS				13	4					3
17	(Denmark) Henrik Spellerberg	13	11	10	11			4	DNQ	15		3
18	(West Germany) Jochen Dauer				5				20			2
19	(Italy) Lamberto Leoni					5	Ret	14	23	Ret		2
20	(United Kingdom) Rupert Keegan	Ret						11			5	2
21	(Italy) Fernando Spreafico					6	DNQ	8	15		8	1
22	(Italy) Orazio Ragaiolo					7	6				7	1
23	(France) Jean-Louis Schlesser							6				1
24	(Sweden) Mats Nygren									6		1
25	(United Kingdom) Geoff Lees										6	1
	(Finland) Erkki Salminen	7	14	Ret	10					14	DNQ	0
	(West Germany) Ernst Maring			Ret	7		16		27			0
	(Sweden) Anders Olofsson	Ret	22	DNQ					DNQ	7		0
	(Brazil) Aryon Cornelsen-Filho						7					0
	(Germany) Rudolf Dötsch	DNS	10	9	8			DNQ	22			0
	(Italy) Paolo Bozzetto			8	9	Ret	11				DNQ	0
	(Italy) Guido Pardini			14		14	8		11		Ret	0
	(Denmark) John Nielsen	Ret	12	DNQ					DNQ	8		0
	(Italy) Severo Zampatti	8										0
	(Germany) Manfred Leppke	DNS		Ret		12	9	DNQ	DNQ		DNQ	0
	(Italy) Tarcisio Riva					9	DNQ		DNQ		DNQ	0
	(Italy) Leonardo Verrelli						DNQ				9	0
	(Germany) Werner Fischer	9										0
	(West Germany) Helmut Bross								10	13		0
	(Italy) Alessandro Pesenti-Rossi					10	Ret				14	0
	(Italy) Oscar Pedersoli	DNS				DNQ	10		17		DNQ	0
	(Italy) Guido Dacco					10	Ret					0
	(Italy) Piero Necchi										10	0
	(Italy) Andrea Morell	10										0
	(Sweden) Stefan Johansson			11					12	DNQ		0
	(Sweden) Lars Svensson	11	15		13		Ret					0
	(West Germany) Huub Rothengatter		18	Ret			13			11		0
	(France) Patrick Bardinon										11	0
	(Italy) Daniele Albertin			15	23		12	DNQ				0
	(Sweden) Bosse Hagberg						DNQ	12	21	Ret		0
	(West Germany) Heinz Scherle	12			24				25			0
	(Sweden) Jan Ridell									12		0
	(Denmark) Ole Vejlund			13				13	13	16		0
	(Italy) Augusto Avanzini						DNQ				13	0
	(West Germany) Marcel Wettstein	14	16									0
	(West Germany) Rudolf Röhnert	17			14							0
	(Sweden) Slim Borgudd	Ret	Ret	19						14		0
	(France) Jean-Jacques Witz	16		Ret			15				DNQ	0
	(United Kingdom) William Dawson	15	20									0
	(West Germany) Walter Spitaler	Ret			15				DNQ			0
	(West Germany) Werner Klein			DNQ	16				18			0
	(Sweden) Thorbjörn Carlsson			16								0
	(Germany) Günter Kölmel	DNS			17		DNQ		26		DNQ	0
	(West Germany) Peter Wisskirchen	21	17									0
	(Sweden) Ingvar Carlsson			17								0
	(Sweden) Mats Peterson									17		0
	(Italy) Massimo Perazza			18	19	DNQ						0
	(West Germany) Josef Kremer	18										0
	(Sweden) Curt Norrman									18		0
	(West Germany) Dieter Kern	22							19			0
	(West Germany) Rolf Egger	19						DNQ				0
	(Sweden) Bonde Hallenmark									19		0
	(Sweden) Sören-Poul Hansen								DNQ	20		0
	(West Germany) John Rust	20										0
	(West Germany) Wolfgang Holy	Ret	21									0
	(Switzerland) Herbert Bürgmayr				21							0
	(Sweden) Dan Molin									21		0
	(West Germany) Wolfgang Locher				22				DNQ			0
	(Switzerland) Hanspeter Kaufmann		23									0
	(West Germany) Heinz Lange							DNQ	24			0
	(West Germany) Olaf Höhn								28			0
	(Sweden) Conny Ljungfeldt		DNS	Ret				DNQ		Ret		0
	(Italy) Piergiovanni Tenani							Ret			DNS	0
	(West Germany) Willi Siller	Ret					DNQ					0
	(Italy) Marcello Rosei					Ret	DNQ					0
	(Italy) Alceste Bodini	Ret										0
	(West Germany) Günter Hölker	Ret										0
	(Italy) Roberto Manzoni										Ret	0
	(West Germany) Roland Saier	Ret										0
	(Sweden) Gunnar Nordström	Ret										0
	(Sweden) Nils-Äke Carlborg			Ret								0
	(Italy) Antonio Rampinini						Ret					0
	(Italy) Bruno Giacomelli						Ret					0
	(Denmark) Lars-Viggo Jensen									Ret		0
	(Italy) Guido Cappellotto						DNQ		DNS		DNQ	0
	(Sweden) Eje Elgh	DNS		DNQ								0
	(Germany) Peter Bonk	DNS							DNQ			0
	(Germany) Alex Wittwer	DNS										0
	(Germany) Norbert Hutter	DNS										0
	(Italy) Giovanni Carminati										DNQ	0
	(Germany) Heinz Schaltinat	DNS										0
	(Italy) Guido Bernasconi					DNQ					DNQ	0
	(Italy) Artemio Rosich					DNQ	DNQ					0
	(Sweden) Gregor Aronsson						DNQ			DNQ		0
	(Italy) Il Liscio						DNQ				DNQ	0
	(Italy) Sandro Cinotti						DNQ				DNQ	0
	(Italy) Marco de Tomasi						DNQ				DNQ	0
	(United Kingdom) Tony Dron						DNQ				DNQ	0
	(Italy) Giorgio Cattini						DNQ				DNQ	0
	(Italy) Giovanni Albertin								DNQ		DNQ	0
	(Italy) Giovanni Bertaccini						DNQ					0
	(Switzerland) Bruno Eggel						DNQ					0
	(Italy) Igino Scarpenti						DNQ					0
	(Italy) Antonio Stalfieri						DNQ					0
	(United Kingdom) Stephen South						DNQ					0
	(Italy) Giordano Regazzoni						DNQ					0
	(France) Pierre Dieudonne						DNQ					0
	(United Kingdom) Richard Hawkins						DNQ					0
	(Italy) Paulo Gomez						DNQ					0
	(Italy) Giulio Regosa						DNQ					0
	(Italy) Duilio Ghislotti						DNQ					0
	(Switzerland) Romeo Camathias						DNQ					0
	(Italy) Alceste Bodini						DNQ					0
	(France) Jean-Pierre Rochat						DNQ					0
	(Italy) Franco Pozzoli						DNQ					0
	(France) Ruggero Gruet						DNQ					0
	(West Germany) Walter Schöch						DNQ					0
	(West Germany) Robert Werl						DNQ					0
	(Italy) Maurizio Orsi						DNQ					0
	(Italy) Mario Benusiglio						DNQ					0
	(West Germany) Barrie Maskell							DNQ				0
	(France) Jean-Claude Alzerat							DNQ				0
	(West Germany) Detlef Schmickler							DNQ				0
	(Spain) Luis de Almenara							DNQ				0
	(Italy) Livio Ponzone							DNQ				0
	(West Germany) Willi Weyer								DNQ			0
	(West Germany) Bernd Breil								DNQ			0
	(Sweden) Kurt Liljekvist									DNQ		0
	(Italy) Gimax										DNQ	0
	(Italy) Manolo Veladini										DNQ	0
Pos	Driver	NÜR (Germany)	ZAN (Netherlands)	MAN (Sweden)	AVUS (Germany)	PER (Italy)	MNZ (Italy)	CRT (France)	KAS (Germany)	KNT (Sweden)	VLL (Italy)	Pts
