= 1977 FIA European Formula 3 Championship =

Open-wheel motor race series

Seasons
- ← 1976 1978 →

The 1977 FIA European Formula 3 Championship was the third edition of the FIA European Formula 3 Championship. The championship consisted of 14 rounds across the continent. The season was won by Italian Piercarlo Ghinzani, with Anders Olofsson second and Nelson Piquet in third. Points were awarded in 9-6-4-3-2-1 fashion to the first six well-placed drivers.

== Calendar ==
Round	Circuit	Date
1	(France) Circuit Paul Ricard, Le Castellet	20 March
2	(Germany) Nürburgring, Nürburg	27 March
3	(Netherlands) Circuit Park Zandvoort, Zandvoort	11 April
4	(Belgium) Circuit Zolder, Heusden-Zolder	24 April
5	(Austria) Österreichring, Spielberg	8 May
6	(Italy) Autodromo Dino Ferrari, Imola	29 May
7	(Italy) Autodromo di Pergusa, Pergusa	12 June
8	(Italy) Autodromo Nazionale Monza, Monza	26 June
9	(France) Circuit de Croix-en-Ternois, Croix-en-Ternois	24 July
10	(Sweden) Ring Knutstorp, Kågeröd	7 August
11	(Germany) Kassel-Calden Circuit, Kassel	21 August
12	(United Kingdom) Donington Park, Leicestershire	27 August
13	(Spain) Circuito del Jarama, Madrid	18 September
14	(Italy) ACI Vallelunga Circuit, Campagnano di Roma	9 October

== Results ==
Round	Circuit	Pole position	Fastest lap	Winning driver	Winning team	Report
1	(France) Circuit Paul Ricard	(Denmark) John Nielsen	(France) Jean-Louis Schlesser	(Italy) Beppe Gabbiani	Trivellato Racing Team	Report
2	(Germany) Nürburgring	(Sweden) Anders Olofsson	(Sweden) Anders Olofsson	(Italy) Piercarlo Ghinzani	Euroracing	Report
3	(Netherlands) Circuit Park Zandvoort	(Sweden) Anders Olofsson	(Sweden) Anders Olofsson	(Sweden) Anders Olofsson	Puss o Kram Jeans Racing	Report
4	(Belgium) Circuit Zolder	(Republic of Ireland) Derek Daly	(Italy) Elio de Angelis	(Italy) Piercarlo Ghinzani	Euroracing	Report
5	(Austria) Österreichring	(Sweden) Anders Olofsson	(Sweden) Anders Olofsson	(Sweden) Anders Olofsson	Puss o Kram Jeans Racing	Report
6	(Italy) Autodromo Dino Ferrari	(Italy) Oscar Pedersoli	(Italy) Elio de Angelis	(Italy) Piercarlo Ghinzani	Euroracing	Report
7	(Italy) Autodromo di Pergusa	(Republic of Ireland) David Kennedy	(Italy) Elio de Angelis	(Italy) Elio de Angelis	Valtellina Racing	Report
9	(France) Circuit de Croix-en-Ternois	(Italy) Elio de Angelis	(Italy) Elio de Angelis	(Republic of Ireland) Derek Daly	Derek McMahon Racing	Report
10	(Sweden) Ring Knutstorp, Kågeröd	(Sweden) Anders Olofsson	(Brazil) Nelson Piquet	(Sweden) Anders Olofsson	Puss o Kram Jeans Racing	Report
11	(Germany) Kassel-Calden Circuit	(Italy) Piercarlo Ghinzani	(Republic of Ireland) David Kennedy	(Brazil) Nelson Piquet	Scuderia Mirabella Mille Miglia	Report
12	(United Kingdom) Donington Park	(Sweden) Eje Elgh	(Brazil) Nelson Piquet	(New Zealand) Brett Riley	David Price Racing	Report
13	(Spain) Circuito del Jarama	(Brazil) Nelson Piquet	(Sweden) Anders Olofsson	(Brazil) Nelson Piquet	Scuderia Mirabella Mille Miglia	Report
14	(Italy) ACI Vallelunga Circuit	(Italy) Elio de Angelis	(Italy) Piercarlo Ghinzani	(Italy) Oscar Pedersoli	Scuderia Gulf Rondini	Report

== Championship standings ==
=== Drivers' championship ===
Place	Driver	Car - Engine	Total
1	(Italy) Piercarlo Ghinzani	March 773-Toyota	58
2	(Sweden) Anders Olofsson	Ralt RT1-Toyota	46
3	(Brazil) Nelson Piquet	March 773-Toyota; Ralt RT1-Toyota	33
4	(Italy) Beppe Gabbiani	Chevron B38-Toyota	26
5	(Italy) Oscar Pedersoli	Ralt RT1-Toyota	24
6	(Italy) Piero Necchi	Chevron B38-Toyota; Ralt RT1-Toyota	22
7	(Italy) Elio de Angelis	Chevron B38-Toyota; Ralt RT1-Toyota	18
8	(Republic of Ireland) David Kennedy	March 773-Toyota; Argo JM1-Toyota	17
9	(Republic of Ireland) Derek Daly	Chevron B38-Toyota	13
=	(Denmark) John Nielsen	Ralt RT1-Toyota	13
11	(Germany) Bertram Schäfer	Ralt RT1-Toyota	11
12	(New Zealand) Brett Riley	March 773-Toyota	9
=	(Sweden) Eje Elgh	Chevron B38-Toyota	9
14	(Sweden) Ulf Svensson	Ralt RT1-Toyota	6
15	(Italy) Marcello Rosei	March 773-Toyota	5
16	(United Kingdom) Geoff Lees	Chevron B38-Toyota	4
=	(Austria) Peter Scharmann	Toj F302-BMW; Toj F302-Toyota	4
=	(Italy) Daniele Albertin	March 773-Toyota	4
19	(Germany) Dieter Kern	Maco 376-BMW	3
=	(Italy) Filippo Niccolini	Ralt RT1-Toyota	3
=	(Denmark) Jac Nellemann	Chevron B38-Toyota	3
=	(Netherlands) Huub Rothengatter	March 763-Toyota	3
23	(Italy) Roberto Campominosi	Ralt RT1-Toyota	2
=	(France) Patrick Gaillard	Chevron B38-Toyota	2
=	(Australia) Geoff Brabham	Ralt RT1-Toyota	2
=	(Italy) Siegfried Stohr	Chevron B38-Toyota	2
=	(Denmark) Henrik Spellerberg	Ralt RT1-Toyota	2
28	(United Kingdom) Derek Warwick	Chevron B38-Toyota	1
=	(Italy) Roberto Farneti	Ralt RT1-Toyota	1
=	(Italy) Fernando Spreafico	Chevron B38-Toyota	1
