= Anders Olofsson =

Swedish racing driver

Bert Anders Olofsson (31 March 1952 – 22 January 2008) was a Swedish racing driver.

== Racing career ==
Olofsson won back-to-back Swedish Formula Three titles in 1977 and 1978 and finished runner-up in the FIA European Formula 3 Championship in the same seasons.

Olofsson won three consecutive Japanese Touring Car titles as a works Nissan driver and triumphed in the 1991 Spa 24 Hours, driving a Nissan Skyline with David Brabham and Naoki Hattori.

From 1988 to 1995, Olofsson competed six times in the Bathurst 1000 touring car race in Australia, all with Gibson Motorsport. He drove in the 1988 Tooheys 1000 with Glenn Seton in a Nissan Skyline HR31 GTS-R, though the pair failed to complete a lap after the gearbox broke when Seton changed from second to third gear only seconds after the rolling start (the same fate had befallen Seton and Olofsson on lap 3 of the Sandown 500 just three weeks earlier, the traditional lead in to Bathurst). In 1989, he returned, driving with George Fury in a HR31 Skyline to finish fourth. After a two-year absence, he returned for Winfield Racing (Gibson) in 1992 (the final year of Group A) in a Nissan Skyline R32 GT-R to finish third outright with television commentator turned racer Neil Crompton. Despite Australian touring car racing abandoning Group A at the end of 1992 and moving to a V8 formula, Olofsson was held in such regard by the Fred Gibson run team that he was invited to return in 1993 and finished fourth with David Brabham in a Holden VP Commodore and 1994 to drive with veteran Colin Bond (the 1969 race winner) to finish sixth in a VP Commodore. Olofsson's last Bathurst 1000 was again with the Gibson team in 1995 where he teamed with Steven Richards in a Holden VR Commodore to again finish fourth.

Olofsson finished second overall and won the GT1 class of the 1997 Le Mans 24 Hours, sharing a Gulf McLaren F1 with Jean-Marc Gounon and Pierre-Henri Raphanel.

Olofsson retired from racing at the end of 1997 and worked in driver management with Swedish racers in the Swedish Touring Car Championship.

== Death ==
Olofsson died in his sleep on 22 January 2008, aged 55.

== Career Results ==
=== Complete European Formula 3 results ===
(key) (Races in bold indicate pole position) (Races in italics indicate fastest lap)

Year	Team	Engine	1	2	3	4	5	6	7	8	9	10	11	12	13	14	15	16	DC	Pts
1975	Rotel Racing	Ford	MON; DNQ	NÜR															10th	6
1975	Anders Olofsson	Ford			AND; 8	MNZ; 7	CET	DJU; 2											10th	6
1976	Viktor Trave	Ford	NÜR; 25	ZAN; 18		AVU; Ret													NC	0
1976	Viktor Trave	Toyota			MAN; DNQ		PER	MNZ	CET	KAS; DNQ	KNU; 7	VLL							NC	0
1977	Puss o Kram Jeans Racing	Toyota	LEC; 4	**NÜR**; 2	**ZAN**; 1	ZOL; Ret	**ÖST**; 1	IMO; 5	PER	MNZ; Ret	CET; 6	**KNU**; 1	KAS; 3	DON; 8	JAR; 4	VLL			2nd	46
1978	Strike Up Racing Team	Toyota	ZAN; 4	NÜR; 1	ÖST; 1	ZOL; 2	**IMO**; 3	NÜR; Ret	**DIJ**; 3	MNZ; Ret	PER; 3	MAG; 10	**KNU**; 1	**KAR**; 2	DON; 5	**KAS**; 1	JAR; 2	VLL; 7	2nd	71
1979	Anders Olofsson	Toyota	VLL	ÖST; DNS	ZOL	MAG	DON; DNS	ZAN	PER	MNZ	KNU; 2	KIN	JAR	KAS					13th	6
1980	Anders Olofsson	Toyota	NÜR	ÖST	ZOL	MAG	ZAN	LAC	MUG	MNZ	MIS	KNU; Ret	SIL	JAR	KAS	ZOL			NC	0

=== Complete Spa 24 Hour results ===
Year	Team	Co-Drivers	Car	Class	Laps	Pos.	Class Pos.
1985	(Sweden) Magnum Racing	(Sweden) Ulf Granberg (Sweden) Ingvar Carlsson	Volvo 240T	Div. 3	98	DNF	DNF
1986	(Belgium) RAS Sport	(Venezuela) Johnny Cecotto (Italy) Mauro Baldi	Volvo 240T	Div. 3	456	12th	7th
1987	(Belgium) Bastos Toyota Team	(Belgium) Pierre-Alain Thibaut (Belgium) Eric Bachelart	Toyota Supra 3.0i MA70	Div. 3	346	DNF	DNF
1988	(United Kingdom) Nissan Motorsports Europe	(Australia) Allan Grice (United Kingdom) Win Percy	Nissan Skyline HR31 GTS-R	Div. 3	482	6th	4th
1991	(Japan) Nismo Zexel	(Australia) David Brabham (Japan) Naoki Hattori	Nissan Skyline R32 GT-R	A/Div. 3	517	**1st**	**1st**
1992	(Japan) Nismo	(Australia) David Brabham (Japan) Masahiro Hasemi	Nissan Skyline R32 GT-R	A/Div. 3	102	DNF	DNF

=== Complete 24 Hours of Le Mans results ===
Year	Team	Co-Drivers	Car	Class	Laps	Pos.	Class Pos.
1987	(Japan) Italya Sports	(France) Alain Ferté (France) Patrick Gonin	Nissan R86V	C1	86	DNF	DNF
1988	(Japan) Italya Sports (Japan) Team Le Mans Co.	(Italy) Lamberto Leoni (Japan) Akio Morimoto	March 88S−Nissan	C1	69	DNF	DNF
1989	(Japan) Team Le Mans Co. (France) Courage Compétition	(Japan) Takao Wada (Japan) Akio Morimoto	March 88S−Nissan	C1	221	DNF	DNF
1990	(Japan) Team Le Mans	(Japan) Takao Wada (Brazil) Maurizio Sandro Sala	Nissan R89C	C1	182	DNF	DNF
1991	(France) Courage Compétition	(United Kingdom) Johnny Dumfries (Sweden) Thomas Danielsson	Cougar C26S−Porsche	C2	45	DNF	DNF
1994	(Sweden) Strandell (Germany) Obermaier Racing	(Italy) Max Angelelli (Switzerland) Sandro Angelastri	Ferrari F40	GT1	51	DNF	DNF
1995	(Italy) Ennea SRL (Italy) Ferrari Club Italia	(Italy) Luciano Della Noce (Japan) Tetsuya Ota	Ferrari F40 GTE	GT1	42	DNF	DNF
1996	(Italy) Ennea SRL Igol	(Italy) Luciano Della Noce (Sweden) Carl Rosenblad	Ferrari F40 GTE	GT1	98	DNF	DNF
1997	(United Kingdom) Gulf Team Davidoff (United Kingdom) GTC Racing	(France) Jean-Marc Gounon (France) Pierre-Henri Raphanel	McLaren F1 GTR	GT1	360	**2nd**	**1st**

=== Complete Bathurst 1000 results ===
Year	Team	Co-Drivers	Car	Class	Laps	Pos.	Class Pos.
1988	(Australia) Peter Jackson Nissan Racing	(Australia) Glenn Seton	Nissan Skyline HR31 GTS-R	A	0	DNF	DNF
1989	Nissan Motorsport Australia	(Australia) George Fury	Nissan Skyline HR31 GTS-R	A	160	4th	4th
1992	(Australia) Winfield Team Nissan	(Australia) Neil Crompton	Nissan Skyline R32 GT-R	A	143	**3rd**	**3rd**
1993	(Australia) Winfield Racing	(Australia) David Brabham	Holden VP Commodore	A	159	4th	4th
1994	(Australia) Winfield Racing	(Australia) Colin Bond	Holden VP Commodore	A	161	6th	6th
1995	(Australia) Winfield Racing	(New Zealand) Steven Richards	Holden VR Commodore		161	4th	4th

=== Complete Japanese Touring Car Championship (–1993) results ===
(key) (Races in bold indicate pole position) (Races in italics indicate fastest lap)

Year	Team	Car	Class	1	2	3	4	5	6	7	8	9	DC	Pts
1986	RAS	Volvo 240	DIV.3	NIS	SUG	TSU	SEN	FUJ; 1	SUZ				？	？
1987	？	Volvo 240	DIV.3	NIS	SEN	TSU; Ret	SUG; Ret						？	？
1987	Nismo	Nissan Skyline GTS-R	DIV.3					FUJ; 9	SUZ; 4				？	？
1988	Nismo	Nissan Skyline GTS-R	JTC-1	SUZ; 1	NIS; 1	SEN; 4	TSU; 3	SUG; 7	FUJ; Ret				？	134
1989	Hasemi Motorsport	Nissan Skyline GTS-R	JTC-1	NIS; 4	SEN; 2	TSU; 1	**SUG**; 1	**SUZ**; 1	FUJ; Ret				1st	161
1990	Hasemi Motorsport	Nissan Skyline GT-R	JTC-1	NIS; 2	**SUG**; 2	SUZ; 1	**TSU**; Ret	SEN; 2	FUJ; 2				3rd	160
1991	Hasemi Motorsport	Nissan Skyline GT-R	JTC-1	SUG; 2	SUZ; 1	TSU; 1	SEN; 2	AUT; 1	FUJ; 4				1st	200
1992	Nismo	Nissan Skyline GT-R	JTC-1	TAI; 5	**AUT**; 1	SUG; 2	SUZ; 4	MIN; NC	TSU; 3	SEN; 2	FUJ; 1		5th	100
1993	Hitotsuyama Racing	BMW M3	JTC-2	MIN	AUT; 3								17th	12
1993	Impul	Nissan Skyline GT-R	JTC-1			SUG; 2	SUZ	TAI	TSU	TOK	SEN	FUJ	15th	15

=== Complete JGTC results ===
(key) (Races in bold indicate pole position) (Races in italics indicate fastest lap)

Year	Team	Car	Class	1	2	3	4	5	6	7	DC	Pts
1997	Team Ferrari Club of Japan	Ferrari F355	GT300	SUZ; 11	FUJ; 4	SEN	FUJ; 2	MIN	SUG; Ret		9th	25
1998	Team Ferrari Club of Japan	Ferrari F355	GT300	SUZ; Ret							NC	0
1998	Inging	Toyota Supra	GT500		FUJ; C	SEN	FUJ	MOT	MIN	SUG	NC	0
1999	Nismo	Nissan Skyline GT-R	GT500	SUZ	FUJ; 5	SUG	MIN	FUJ	TAI	MOT	21st	8

=== Complete FIA GT Championship results ===
Year	Team	Car	Class	1	2	3	4	5	6	7	8	9	10	11	DC	Pts
1997	Gulf Team Davidoff	McLaren F1 GTR	GT1	HOC	SIL	HEL	NÜR; Ret	SPA; Ret	A1R; 5	SUZ; 3	DON; 7	MUG; 8	SEB; 10	LAG; 6	20th	7
