= 1994 Italian Superturismo Championship =

Seasons
- ← 1993 1995 →

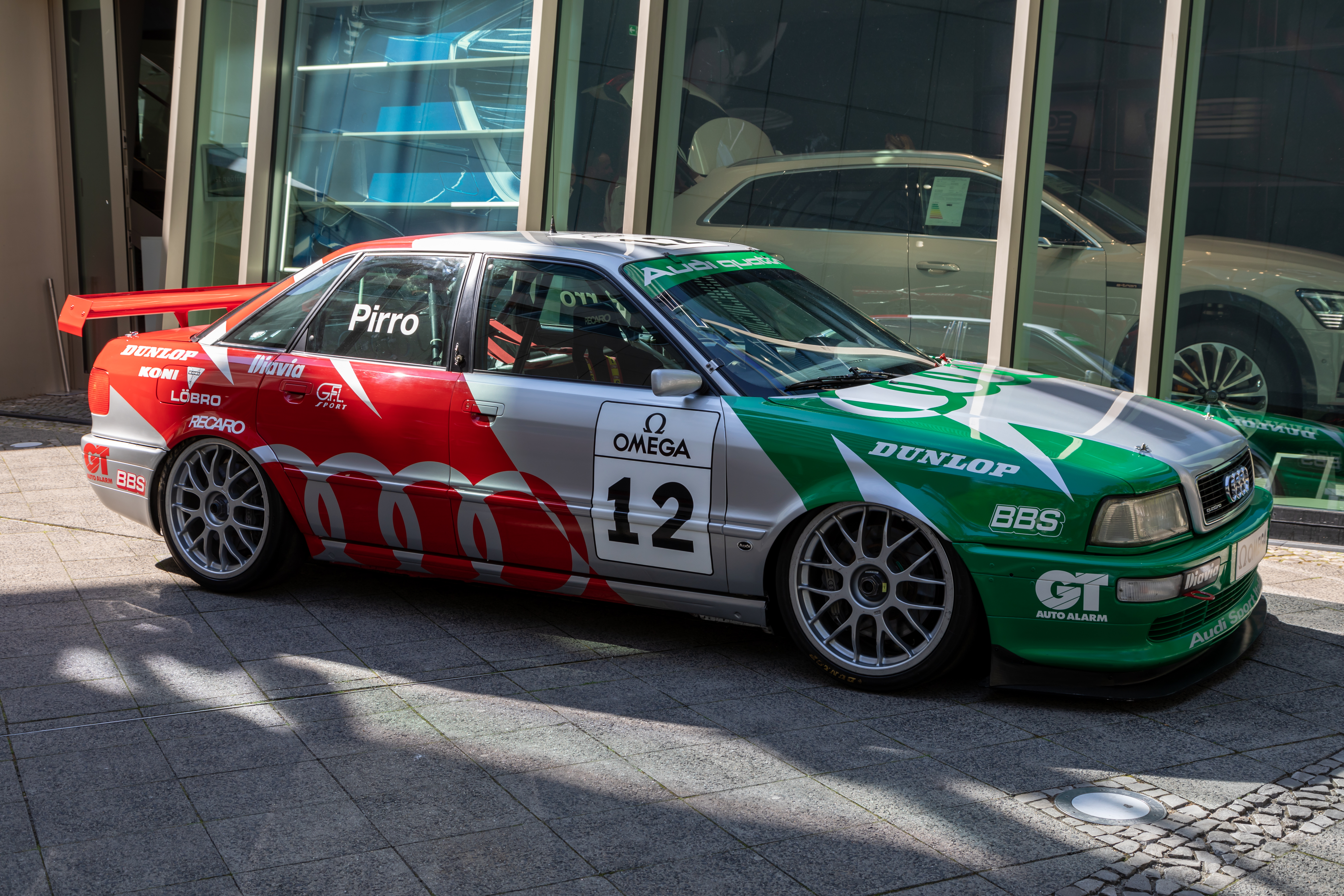
Audi 80 quattro of Emanuele Pierro

The 1994 Italian Superturismo Championship was the eighth edition of the Italian Superturismo Championship.

== Season summary ==
The season began in Monza on 10 April and finished in Mugello on 2 October, after ten rounds. Emanuele Pirro won the championship (6 victories, 7 second places and scoring points in each round), driving an Audi 80 Quattro; the German manufacturer won the constructors' championship with 9 victories (6 Emanuele Pirro, 2 Frank Biela, 1 Rinaldo Capello) on 20 races. The strongest title contender was Antonio Tamburini, who drove an Alfa Romeo 155 TS and also got 6 victories but also 3 DNF and one time out of points. Third was Fabrizio Giovanardi, who was able to finish on podium 7 times and to score points in almost all races without a single victory. The three time Italian Champion Roberto Ravaglia had lot of bad luck and finished fourth after a single victory in the season. The privateers' trophy was won by Moreno Soli in his own the Alfa Romeo 155 TS.

== Teams and drivers ==
| Team | Car | No. | Drivers | Rounds | Class |
|---|---|---|---|---|---|
| (Italy) CiBiEmme Engineering | BMW 318i | 1 | (Italy) Roberto Ravaglia | All | |
| (Italy) CiBiEmme Engineering | BMW 318i | 2 | (Italy) Emanuele Naspetti | All | |
| (Italy) Peugeot Talbot Sport | Peugeot 405 | 3 | (Italy) Fabrizio Giovanardi | All | |
| (Italy) Peugeot Talbot Sport | Peugeot 405 | 4 | (United Kingdom) Gary Ayles | 1–7, 9-10 | |
| (Italy) Nordauto Engineering | Alfa Romeo 155 TS | 5 | (Italy) Tamara Vidali | All | |
| (Italy) Nordauto Engineering | Alfa Romeo 155 TS | 6 | (Italy) Antonio Tamburini | All | |
| (Italy) Scuderia Bigazzi | BMW 318i | 7 | (Germany) Joachim Winkelhock | 1 | |
| (Italy) Scuderia Bigazzi | BMW 318i | 7 | (Italy) Massimiliano Crinelli | 2 | |
| (Italy) Scuderia Bigazzi | BMW 318i | 7 | (Venezuela) Johnny Cecotto | 3-10 | |
| (Italy) Scuderia Bigazzi | BMW 318i | 8 | (Germany) Alexander Burgstaller | All | |
| (Italy) Euroteam | Alfa Romeo 155 TS | 9 | (Italy) Stefano Modena | 1-7, 10 | |
| (Italy) Euroteam | Alfa Romeo 155 TS | 11 | (Italy) Marco Brand | 1-7, 9-10 | |
| (Italy) Audi Sport Italia | Audi 80 Quattro | 12 | (Italy) Emanuele Pirro | All | |
| (Italy) Audi Sport Italia | Audi 80 Quattro | 14 | (Italy) Rinaldo Capello | All | |
| (Italy) Top Run | Alfa Romeo 155 TS | 15 | (Italy) Enrico Bertaggia | 1-3 | |
| (Italy) Top Run | Alfa Romeo 155 TS | 16 | (Italy) Giovanni Bonanno | 1, 3 | |
| (Italy) Audi Sport Italia | Audi 80 Quattro | 18 | (Germany) Frank Biela | 7-10 | |
| (Italy) Euroteam | Alfa Romeo 155 TS | 19 | (Italy) Giuseppe Gabbiani | 8 | |
| (Italy) Peugeot Talbot Sport | Peugeot 405 | 21 | (Italy) Amato Ferrari | All | |
| (Germany) BMW Team Schneider | BMW 318i | 22 | (Germany) Altfrid Heger | 2 | |
| (Italy) Euroteam | Alfa Romeo 155 TS | 24 | (Italy) Stefano Buttiero | 8-9 | |
| (Italy) Soli Racing Team | Alfa Romeo 155 TS | 51 | (Italy) Moreno Soli | All | P |
| (Italy) Fire Wake Competition | Peugeot 405 | 52 | (Italy) Massimo Pigoli | 1-7, 9-10 | P |
| (Italy) Fire Wake Competition | Peugeot 405 | 53 | (Italy) Claudio Melotto | 1-7 | P |
| (Italy) Europa Corse | Peugeot 405 | 54 | (Italy) Maurizio Lusuardi | 1-3, 5-7, 9-10 | P |
| (Italy) Tecnica Racing Team | Alfa Romeo 155 TS | 55 | (Italy) Felice Tedeschi | 1-2, 4-7, 10 | P |
| (Italy) Tecnica Racing Team | Alfa Romeo 155 TS | 56 | (Italy) Danilo Mozzi | 1-2, 4-10 | P |
| (Italy) Tecnica Racing Team | Alfa Romeo 155 TS | 57 | (Italy) Marco Antonelli | 9 | P |
| (Italy) Eurospeed Racing | BMW 318i | 58 | (Italy) Rocco Peduzzi | 5-9 | P |
| (Italy) Top Run | Alfa Romeo 155 TS | 59 | (Italy) Roberto Russo | 4-6, 9-10 | P |
| (Italy) Top Run | Alfa Romeo 155 TS | 61 | (Italy) Mauro Trione | 6 | P |
| (Italy) Top Run | Alfa Romeo 155 TS | 62 | (Italy) Gianluca Roda | 7, 9-10 | P |
| (Italy) Fire Wake Competition | Peugeot 405 | 64 | (Switzerland) Felipe Ortiz | 9-10 | P |
| (Italy) Top Run | Alfa Romeo 155 TS | 69 | (Italy) Onofrio Russo | 4 | P |

| Icon | Class |
|---|---|
| P | Private Drivers |

=== Drivers changes ===
Changed Cars

- Stefano Modena: BMW 318i → Alfa Romeo 155
- Rinaldo Capello: Volkswagen Vento → Audi 80 Quattro
- Emanuele Pirro: BMW 318i → Audi 80 Quattro

Entering Superturismo 1994

- Emanuele Naspetti: F1 → BMW 318iS
- Antonio Tamburini: No full-time drive → Alfa Romeo 155
- Marco Brand: No full-time drive → Alfa Romeo 155

Leaving Superturismo 1994

- Gabriele Tarquini: → BTCC
- Gianni Morbidelli: → F1

== Race calendar and results ==
| Round | | Circuit | Date | Pole position | Fastest lap | Winning driver | Winning team |
|---|---|---|---|---|---|---|---|
| 1 | R1 | (Italy) Autodromo Nazionale Monza | 10 April | (Italy) Antonio Tamburini | (Italy) Antonio Tamburini | (Italy) Antonio Tamburini | (Italy) Nordauto Engineering |
| 1 | R2 | (Italy) Autodromo Nazionale Monza | 10 April | | (Italy) Stefano Modena | (Italy) Antonio Tamburini | (Italy) Nordauto Engineering |
| 2 | R1 | (Italy) ACI Vallelunga Circuit | 17 April | (Italy) Stefano Modena | (Italy) Stefano Modena | (Italy) Stefano Modena | (Italy) Euroteam |
| 2 | R2 | (Italy) ACI Vallelunga Circuit | 17 April | | (Italy) Stefano Modena | (Italy) Emanuele Pirro | (Italy) Audi Sport Italia |
| 3 | R1 | (Italy) Autodromo di Magione | 8 May | (Italy) Stefano Modena | (Italy) Stefano Modena | (Italy) Emanuele Pirro | (Italy) Audi Sport Italia |
| 3 | R2 | (Italy) Autodromo di Magione | 8 May | | (Italy) Emanuele Pirro | (Italy) Emanuele Pirro | (Italy) Audi Sport Italia |
| 4 | R1 | (Italy) Autodromo del Levante | 22 May | (Venezuela) Johnny Cecotto | (Italy) Emanuele Pirro | (Italy) Emanuele Pirro | (Italy) Audi Sport Italia |
| 4 | R2 | (Italy) Autodromo del Levante | 22 May | | (Italy) Emanuele Pirro | (Italy) Emanuele Pirro | (Italy) Audi Sport Italia |
| 5 | R1 | (Italy) Circuito Internazionale Misano | 5 June | (Italy) Antonio Tamburini | (Italy) Stefano Modena | (Italy) Antonio Tamburini | (Italy) Nordauto Engineering |
| 5 | R2 | (Italy) Circuito Internazionale Misano | 5 June | | (Italy) Antonio Tamburini | (Italy) Antonio Tamburini | (Italy) Nordauto Engineering |
| 6 | R1 | (Italy) ACI Vallelunga Circuit | 19 June | (Italy) Stefano Modena | (Italy) Emanuele Pirro | (Italy) Stefano Modena | (Italy) Euroteam |
| 6 | R2 | (Italy) ACI Vallelunga Circuit | 19 June | | (Italy) Roberto Ravaglia | (Italy) Emanuele Pirro | (Italy) Audi Sport Italia |
| 7 | R1 | (Italy) Autodromo Internazionale del Mugello | 31 July | (Italy) Roberto Ravaglia | (Italy) Roberto Ravaglia | (Italy) Roberto Ravaglia | (Italy) CiBiEmme Engineering |
| 7 | R2 | (Italy) Autodromo Internazionale del Mugello | 31 July | | (Italy) Stefano Modena | (Italy) Stefano Modena | (Italy) Euroteam |
| 8 | R1 | (Italy) Autodromo di Pergusa | 4 September | (Italy) Antonio Tamburini | (Venezuela) Johnny Cecotto | (Italy) Antonio Tamburini | (Italy) Nordauto Engineering |
| 8 | R2 | (Italy) Autodromo di Pergusa | 4 September | | (Italy) Fabrizio Giovanardi | (Italy) Antonio Tamburini | (Italy) Nordauto Engineering |
| 9 | R1 | (Italy) Autodromo Riccardo Paletti di Varano | 18 September | (Germany) Frank Biela | (Germany) Frank Biela | (Germany) Frank Biela | (Italy) Audi Sport Italia |
| 9 | R2 | (Italy) Autodromo Riccardo Paletti di Varano | 18 September | | (Germany) Frank Biela | (Germany) Frank Biela | (Italy) Audi Sport Italia |
| 10 | R1 | (Italy) Autodromo Internazionale del Mugello | 2 October | (Germany) Frank Biela | (Italy) Rinaldo Capello | (Italy) Emanuele Naspetti | (Italy) CiBiEmme Engineering |
| 10 | R2 | (Italy) Autodromo Internazionale del Mugello | 2 October | | (Italy) Emanuele Pirro | (Italy) Rinaldo Capello | (Italy) Audi Sport Italia |

== Round 1 (Italy) Monza ==
Qualifying

| Pos | No | Driver | Car | Lap Time | Top Qualifying |
|---|---|---|---|---|---|
| 1 | 6 | (Italy) Antonio Tamburini | Alfa Romeo 155 | 1.55.148 | TQ |
| 2 | 9 | (Italy) Stefano Modena | Alfa Romeo 155 | 1.55.978 | TQ |
| 3 | 1 | (Italy) Roberto Ravaglia | BMW 318iS | 1.56.113 | TQ |
| 4 | 12 | (Italy) Emanuele Pirro | Audi 80 Quattro | 1.56.270 | TQ |
| 5 | 11 | (Italy) Marco Brand | Alfa Romeo 155 | 1.56.448 | TQ |
| 6 | 8 | (Germany) Alexander Burgstaller | BMW 318iS | 1.57.099 | TQ |
| 7 | 14 | (Italy) Rinaldo Capello | Audi 80 Quattro | 1.57.298 | TQ |
| 8 | 7 | (Germany) Joachim Winkelhock | BMW 318iS | 1.57.587 | TQ |
| 9 | 2 | (Italy) Emanuele Naspetti | BMW 318iS | 1.57.691 | TQ |
| 10 | 4 | (United Kingdom) Gary Ayles | Peugeot 405 | 1.57.912 | TQ |
| 11 | 3 | (Italy) Fabrizio Giovanardi | Peugeot 405 | 1.56.648 | |
| 12 | 5 | (Italy) Tamara Vidali | Alfa Romeo 155 | 1.56.687 | |
| 13 | 21 | (Italy) Amato Ferrari | Peugeot 405 | 1.57.021 | |
| 14 | 16 | (Italy) Giovanni Bonanno | Alfa Romeo 155 | 1.57.725 | |
| 15 | 52 | (Italy) Massimo Pigoli | Peugeot 405 | 1.59.639 | |
| 16 | 55 | (Italy) Felice Tedeschi | Alfa Romeo 155 | 1.59.727 | |
| 17 | 56 | (Italy) Danilo Mozzi | Alfa Romeo 155 | 2.00.415 | |
| 18 | 51 | (Italy) Moreno Soli | Alfa Romeo 155 | 2.00.518 | |
| 19 | 54 | (Italy) Maurizio Lusuardi | Peugeot 405 | 2.03.028 | |
| 20 | 53 | (Italy) Claudio Melotto | Peugeot 405 | 2.03.349 | |
| 21 | 15 | (Italy) Enrico Bertaggia | Alfa Romeo 155 | 2.20.367 | |

Race 1

| Pos | No | Driver | Constructor | Time/Retired | Points |
|---|---|---|---|---|---|
| 1 | 6 | (Italy) Antonio Tamburini | Alfa Romeo 155 | 15 laps in 29:29.428 | 20 |
| 2 | 12 | (Italy) Emanuele Pirro | Audi 80 Quattro | +6.98s | 15 |
| 3 | 14 | (Italy) Rinaldo Capello | Audi 80 Quattro | +7.16s | 12 |
| 4 | 8 | (Germany) Alexander Burgstaller | BMW 318iS | +34.32s | 10 |
| 5 | 5 | (Italy) Tamara Vidali | Alfa Romeo 155 | +34.49s | 8 |
| 6 | 4 | (United Kingdom) Gary Ayles | Peugeot 405 | +34.87s | 6 |
| 7 | 16 | (Italy) Giovanni Bonanno | Alfa Romeo 155 | +41.94s | 4 |
| 8 | 3 | (Italy) Fabrizio Giovanardi | Peugeot 405 | +46.07s | 3 |
| 9 | 56 | (Italy) Danilo Mozzi | Alfa Romeo 155 | +1.16.06s | 2 |
| 10 | 7 | (Germany) Joachim Winkelhock | BMW 318iS | +1.17.86s | 1 |
| 11 | 52 | (Italy) Massimo Pigoli | Peugeot 405 | +1.30.97s | |
| 12 | 54 | (Italy) Maurizio Lusuardi | Peugeot 405 | +1 lap | |
| 13 | 66 | (Italy) Claudio Melotto | Peugeot 405 | +1 lap | |
| 14 | 2 | (Italy) Emanuele Naspetti | BMW 318iS | +2 laps | |
| 15 DNF | 9 | (Italy) Stefano Modena | Alfa Romeo 155 | +2 laps | |
| 16 DNF | 1 | (Italy) Roberto Ravaglia | BMW 318iS | +2 laps | |
| 17 DNF | 55 | (Italy) Felice Tedeschi | Alfa Romeo 155 | +5 laps | |
| 18 DNF | 51 | (Italy) Moreno Soli | Alfa Romeo 155 | +7 laps | |
| 19 DNF | 21 | (Italy) Amato Ferrari | Peugeot 405 | +7 laps | |
| DNF | 15 | (Italy) Enrico Bertaggia | Alfa Romeo 155 | +8 laps | |
| DNF | 11 | (Italy) Marco Brand | Alfa Romeo 155 | +9 laps | |

- Fastest Lap: Antonio Tamburini in 1.56.113 on lap 2

Race 2

| Pos | No | Driver | Constructor | Time/Retired | Points |
|---|---|---|---|---|---|
| 1 | 6 | (Italy) Antonio Tamburini | Alfa Romeo 155 | 15 laps in 29:20.653 | 20 |
| 2 | 12 | (Italy) Emanuele Pirro | Audi 80 Quattro | +2.966s | 15 |
| 3 | 14 | (Italy) Rinaldo Capello | Audi 80 Quattro | +3.439s | 12 |
| 4 | 9 | (Italy) Stefano Modena | Alfa Romeo 155 | +6.356s | 10 |
| 5 | 5 | (Italy) Tamara Vidali | Alfa Romeo 155 | +13.984s | 8 |
| 6 | 1 | (Italy) Roberto Ravaglia | BMW 318iS | +18.101s | 6 |
| 7 | 2 | (Italy) Emanuele Naspetti | BMW 318iS | +29.279s | 4 |
| 8 | 8 | (Germany) Alexander Burgstaller | BMW 318iS | +30.072s | 3 |
| 9 | 7 | (Germany) Joachim Winkelhock | BMW 318iS | +32.389s | 2 |
| 10 | 16 | (Italy) Giovanni Bonanno | Alfa Romeo 155 | +42.577s | 1 |
| 11 | 3 | (Italy) Fabrizio Giovanardi | Peugeot 405 | +44.440s | |
| 12 | 4 | (United Kingdom) Gary Ayles | Peugeot 405 | +55.424s | |
| 13 | 21 | (Italy) Amato Ferrari | Peugeot 405 | +1.23.963s | |
| 14 | 56 | (Italy) Danilo Mozzi | Alfa Romeo 155 | +1 lap | |
| 15 | 54 | (Italy) Maurizio Lusuardi | Peugeot 405 | +1 lap | |
| 16 | 52 | (Italy) Massimo Pigoli | Peugeot 405 | +1 lap | |
| DNF | 51 | (Italy) Moreno Soli | Alfa Romeo 155 | +10 laps | |
| DNF | 66 | (Italy) Claudio Melotto | Peugeot 405 | +10 laps | |
| DNF | 55 | (Italy) Felice Tedeschi | Alfa Romeo 155 | +10 laps | |
| DNS | 15 | (Italy) Enrico Bertaggia | Alfa Romeo 155 | | |
| DNS | 11 | (Italy) Marco Brand | Alfa Romeo 155 | | |

- Fastest Lap: Stefano Modena in 1.56.656 on lap 5

=== Championship standings after Round 1 ===
Drivers' Championship standings

| Pos | Driver | Points |
|---|---|---|
| 1 | (Italy) Antonio Tamburini | 40 |
| 2 | (Italy) Emanuele Pirro | 30 |
| 3 | (Italy) Rinaldo Capello | 24 |
| 4 | (Italy) Tamara Vidali | 16 |
| 5 | (Germany) Alexander Burgstaller | 13 |

Constructors' Championship standings

| Pos | Constructor | Points |
|---|---|---|
| 1 | (Italy) Alfa Romeo | 40 |
| 2 | (Germany) Audi | 30 |
| 3 | (Germany) BMW | 16 |
| 4 | (France) Peugeot | 6 |

== Round 2 (Italy) Vallelunga ==
Qualifying

| Pos | No | Driver | Car | Lap Time | Top Qualifying |
|---|---|---|---|---|---|
| 1 | 9 | (Italy) Stefano Modena | Alfa Romeo 155 | 1.18.859 | TQ |
| 2 | 6 | (Italy) Antonio Tamburini | Alfa Romeo 155 | 1.19.351 | TQ |
| 3 | 14 | (Italy) Rinaldo Capello | Audi 80 Quattro | 1.19.408 | TQ |
| 4 | 12 | (Italy) Emanuele Pirro | Audi 80 Quattro | 1.19.420 | TQ |
| 5 | 3 | (Italy) Fabrizio Giovanardi | Peugeot 405 | 1.19.732 | TQ |
| 6 | 5 | (Italy) Tamara Vidali | Alfa Romeo 155 | 1.20.140 | TQ |
| 7 | 4 | (United Kingdom) Gary Ayles | Peugeot 405 | 1.20.223 | TQ |
| 8 | 8 | (Germany) Alexander Burgstaller | BMW 318iS | 1.20.304 | TQ |
| 9 | 22 | (Germany) Altfrid Heger | BMW 318iS | 1.20.500 | TQ |
| 10 | 21 | (Italy) Amato Ferrari | Peugeot 405 | 1.20.738 | TQ |
| 11 | 11 | (Italy) Marco Brand | Alfa Romeo 155 | 1.20.551 | |
| 12 | 1 | (Italy) Roberto Ravaglia | BMW 318iS | 1.20.605 | |
| 13 | 15 | (Italy) Enrico Bertaggia | Alfa Romeo 155 | 1.20.626 | |
| 14 | 55 | (Italy) Felice Tedeschi | Alfa Romeo 155 | 1.20.636 | |
| 15 | 2 | (Italy) Emanuele Naspetti | BMW 318iS | 1.21.222 | |
| 16 | 56 | (Italy) Danilo Mozzi | Alfa Romeo 155 | 1.21.740 | |
| 17 | 51 | (Italy) Moreno Soli | Alfa Romeo 155 | 1.22.336 | |
| 18 | 52 | (Italy) Massimo Pigoli | Peugeot 405 | 1.23.477 | |
| 19 | 54 | (Italy) Maurizio Lusuardi | Peugeot 405 | 1.24.658 | |
| 20 | 53 | (Italy) Claudio Melotto | Peugeot 405 | 1.26.304 | |
| 21 | 7 | (Italy) Massimiliano Crinelli | BMW 318iS | 1.31.868 | |

Race 1

| Pos | No | Driver | Constructor | Time/Retired | Points |
|---|---|---|---|---|---|
| 1 | 9 | (Italy) Stefano Modena | Alfa Romeo 155 | 22 laps in 33:08.380 | 20 |
| 2 | 3 | (Italy) Fabrizio Giovanardi | Peugeot 405 | +37.773s | 15 |
| 3 | 6 | (Italy) Antonio Tamburini | Alfa Romeo 155 | +39.198s | 12 |
| 4 | 55 | (Italy) Felice Tedeschi | Alfa Romeo 155 | +51.001s | 10 |
| 5 | 21 | (Italy) Amato Ferrari | Peugeot 405 | +51.997s | 8 |
| 6 | 4 | (United Kingdom) Gary Ayles | Peugeot 405 | +53.805 | 6 |
| 7 | 8 | (Germany) Alexander Burgstaller | BMW 318i | +58.059s | 4 |
| 8 | 15 | (Italy) Enrico Bertaggia | Alfa Romeo 155 | +1.00.056s | 3 |
| 9 | 5 | (Italy) Tamara Vidali | Alfa Romeo 155 | +1.14.727s | 2 |
| 10 | 12 | (Italy) Emanuele Pirro | Audi 80 Quattro | +1.28.716s | 1 |
| 11 | 56 | (Italy) Danilo Mozzi | Alfa Romeo 155 | +1.32.278s | |
| 12 | 51 | (Italy) Moreno Soli | Alfa Romeo 155 | +1 lap | |
| 13 | 52 | (Italy) Massimo Pigoli | Peugeot 405 | +1 lap | |
| 14 | 53 | (Italy) Claudio Melotto | Peugeot 405 | +1 lap | |
| 15 | 2 | (Italy) Emanuele Naspetti | BMW 318iS | +1 lap | |
| 16 | 54 | (Italy) Maurizio Lusuardi | Peugeot 405 | +1 lap | |
| 17 | 11 | (Italy) Marco Brand | Alfa Romeo 155 | +4 laps | |
| 18 | 14 | (Italy) Rinaldo Capello | Audi 80 Quattro | +4 laps | |
| 19 | 7 | (Italy) Massimiliano Crinelli | BMW 318i | +4 laps | |
| 20 | 1 | (Italy) Roberto Ravaglia | BMW 318iS | +5 laps | |
| DNF | 22 | (Germany) Altfrid Heger | BMW 318i | +12 laps | |

- Fastest Lap: Stefano Modena in 1.29.307 on lap 3

Race 2

| Pos | No | Driver | Constructor | Time/Retired | Points |
|---|---|---|---|---|---|
| 1 | 12 | (Italy) Emanuele Pirro | Audi 80 Quattro | 22 laps in 31:49.165 | 20 |
| 2 | 14 | (Italy) Rinaldo Capello | Audi 80 Quattro | +7.125s | 15 |
| 3 | 8 | (Germany) Alexander Burgstaller | BMW 318i | +54.674s | 12 |
| 4 | 22 | (Germany) Altfrid Heger | BMW 318i | +1.06.544s | 10 |
| 5 | 52 | (Italy) Massimo Pigoli | Peugeot 405 | +1.20.188s | 8 |
| 6 | 1 | (Italy) Roberto Ravaglia | BMW 318iS | +1.20.263s | 6 |
| 7 | 9 | (Italy) Stefano Modena | Alfa Romeo 155 | +1 lap | 4 |
| 8 | 3 | (Italy) Fabrizio Giovanardi | Peugeot 405 | +1 lap | 3 |
| 9 | 4 | (United Kingdom) Gary Ayles | Peugeot 405 | +1 lap | 2 |
| 10 | 6 | (Italy) Antonio Tamburini | Alfa Romeo 155 | +1 lap | 1 |
| 11 | 51 | (Italy) Moreno Soli | Alfa Romeo 155 | +1 lap | |
| 12 | 5 | (Italy) Tamara Vidali | Alfa Romeo 155 | +1 lap | |
| 13 | 21 | (Italy) Amato Ferrari | Peugeot 405 | +1 lap | |
| 14 | 2 | (Italy) Emanuele Naspetti | BMW 318iS | +1 lap | |
| 15 | 54 | (Italy) Maurizio Lusuardi | Peugeot 405 | +1 lap | |
| 16 | 53 | (Italy) Claudio Melotto | Peugeot 405 | +1 lap | |
| 17 | 56 | (Italy) Danilo Mozzi | Alfa Romeo 155 | +2 laps | |
| DNF | 15 | (Italy) Enrico Bertaggia | Alfa Romeo 155 | +9 laps | |
| DNF | 55 | (Italy) Felice Tedeschi | Alfa Romeo 155 | +20 laps | |
| DNS | 7 | (Italy) Massimiliano Crinelli | BMW 318i | | |
| DNS | 11 | (Italy) Marco Brand | Alfa Romeo 155 | | |

- Fastest Lap: Stefano Modena in 1.20.858 on lap 18

=== Championship standings after Round 2 ===
Drivers' Championship standings

| Pos | Driver | Points |
|---|---|---|
| 1 | (Italy) Antonio Tamburini | 53 |
| 2 | (Italy) Emanuele Pirro | 51 |
| 3 | (Italy) Rinaldo Capello | 39 |
| 4 | (Italy) Stefano Modena | 34 |
| 5 | (Germany) Alexander Burgstaller | 29 |

Constructors' Championship standings

| Pos | Constructor | Points |
|---|---|---|
| 1 | (Italy) Alfa Romeo | 64 |
| 2 | (Germany) Audi | 51 |
| 3 | (Germany) BMW | 32 |
| 4 | (France) Peugeot | 29 |

== Round 3 (Italy) Magione ==
Qualifying

| Pos | No | Driver | Car | Lap Time | Top Qualifying |
|---|---|---|---|---|---|
| 1 | 9 | (Italy) Stefano Modena | Alfa Romeo 155 | 52.999 | TQ |
| 2 | 5 | (Italy) Tamara Vidali | Alfa Romeo 155 | 53.181 | TQ |
| 3 | 12 | (Italy) Emanuele Pirro | Audi 80 Quattro | 53.320 | TQ |
| 4 | 14 | (Italy) Rinaldo Capello | Audi 80 Quattro | 53.381 | TQ |
| 5 | 1 | (Italy) Roberto Ravaglia | BMW 318iS | 53.388 | TQ |
| 6 | 3 | (Italy) Fabrizio Giovanardi | Peugeot 405 | 53.535 | TQ |
| 7 | 6 | (Italy) Antonio Tamburini | Alfa Romeo 155 | 53.575 | TQ |
| 8 | 2 | (Italy) Emanuele Naspetti | BMW 318iS | 53.834 | TQ |
| 9 | 8 | (Germany) Alexander Burgstaller | BMW 318iS | 53.881 | TQ |
| 10 | 7 | (Venezuela) Johnny Cecotto | BMW 318iS | 55.589 | TQ |
| 11 | 21 | (Italy) Amato Ferrari | Peugeot 405 | 53.449 | |
| 12 | 11 | (Italy) Marco Brand | Alfa Romeo 155 | 53.520 | |
| 13 | 16 | (Italy) Giovanni Bonanno | Alfa Romeo 155 | 53.548 | |
| 14 | 4 | (United Kingdom) Gary Ayles | Peugeot 405 | 53.561 | |
| 15 | 15 | (Italy) Enrico Bertaggia | Alfa Romeo 155 | 53.926 | |
| 16 | 51 | (Italy) Moreno Soli | Alfa Romeo 155 | 54.213 | |
| 17 | 52 | (Italy) Massimo Pigoli | Peugeot 405 | 55.254 | |
| 18 | 54 | (Italy) Maurizio Lusuardi | Peugeot 405 | 55.370 | |
| 19 | 53 | (Italy) Claudio Melotto | Peugeot 405 | 56.531 | |

Race 1

| Pos | No | Driver | Constructor | Time/Retired | Points |
|---|---|---|---|---|---|
| 1 | 12 | (Italy) Emanuele Pirro | Audi 80 Quattro | 32 laps in 28:55.417 | 20 |
| 2 | 14 | (Italy) Rinaldo Capello | Audi 80 Quattro | +6.730s | 15 |
| 3 | 1 | (Italy) Roberto Ravaglia | BMW 318iS | +15.847s | 12 |
| 4 | 5 | (Italy) Tamara Vidali | Alfa Romeo 155 | +26.858s | 10 |
| 5 | 2 | (Italy) Emanuele Naspetti | BMW 318iS | +27.151s | 8 |
| 6 | 8 | (Germany) Alexander Burgstaller | BMW 318i | +29.393s | 6 |
| 7 | 3 | (Italy) Fabrizio Giovanardi | Peugeot 405 | +35.709s | 4 |
| 8 | 6 | (Italy) Antonio Tamburini | Alfa Romeo 155 | +36.713s | 3 |
| 9 | 7 | (Venezuela) Johnny Cecotto | BMW 318i | +39.123s | 2 |
| 10 | 4 | (United Kingdom) Gary Ayles | Peugeot 405 | +46.184s | 1 |
| 11 | 16 | (Italy) Giovanni Bonanno | Alfa Romeo 155 | +46.649s | |
| 12 | 15 | (Italy) Enrico Bertaggia | Alfa Romeo 155 | +47.137s | |
| 13 | 51 | (Italy) Moreno Soli | Alfa Romeo 155 | +1 lap | |
| 14 | 52 | (Italy) Massimo Pigoli | Peugeot 405 | +1 lap | |
| 15 | 54 | (Italy) Maurizio Lusuardi | Peugeot 405 | +1 lap | |
| DNF | 9 | (Italy) Stefano Modena | Alfa Romeo 155 | +18 laps | |
| DNF | 11 | (Italy) Marco Brand | Alfa Romeo 155 | +18 laps | |
| DNF | 53 | (Italy) Claudio Melotto | Peugeot 405 | +18 laps | |
| DNF | 21 | (Italy) Amato Ferrari | Peugeot 405 | +19 laps | |

- Fastest Lap: Stefano Modena in 53.652 on lap 7

Race 2

| Pos | No | Driver | Constructor | Time/Retired | Points |
|---|---|---|---|---|---|
| 1 | 12 | (Italy) Emanuele Pirro | Audi 80 Quattro | 29 laps in 26:05.721 | 20 |
| 2 | 1 | (Italy) Roberto Ravaglia | BMW 318iS | +7.832s | 15 |
| 3 | 3 | (Italy) Fabrizio Giovanardi | Peugeot 405 | +11.315s | 12 |
| 4 | 7 | (Venezuela) Johnny Cecotto | BMW 318i | +11.621s | 10 |
| 5 | 6 | (Italy) Antonio Tamburini | Alfa Romeo 155 | +15.562s | 8 |
| 6 | 16 | (Italy) Giovanni Bonanno | Alfa Romeo 155 | +29.874s | 6 |
| 7 | 5 | (Italy) Tamara Vidali | Alfa Romeo 155 | +33.361s | 4 |
| 8 | 15 | (Italy) Enrico Bertaggia | Alfa Romeo 155 | +39.806s | 3 |
| 9 | 4 | (United Kingdom) Gary Ayles | Peugeot 405 | +41.791s | 2 |
| 10 | 21 | (Italy) Amato Ferrari | Peugeot 405 | +44.345s | 1 |
| 11 | 8 | (Germany) Alexander Burgstaller | BMW 318i | +48.911s | |
| 12 | 11 | (Italy) Marco Brand | Alfa Romeo 155 | +53.398s | |
| 13 | 51 | (Italy) Moreno Soli | Alfa Romeo 155 | +1 lap | |
| 14 | 52 | (Italy) Massimo Pigoli | Peugeot 405 | +1 lap | |
| 15 | 54 | (Italy) Maurizio Lusuardi | Peugeot 405 | +1 lap | |
| 16 | 2 | (Italy) Emanuele Naspetti | BMW 318iS | +2 laps | |
| DNF | 53 | (Italy) Claudio Melotto | Peugeot 405 | +20 laps | |
| DNF | 14 | (Italy) Rinaldo Capello | Audi 80 Quattro | +32 laps | |
| DNS | 9 | (Italy) Stefano Modena | Alfa Romeo 155 | | |

- Fastest Lap: Emanuele Pirro in 53.314 on lap 9

=== Championship standings after Round 3 ===
Drivers' Championship standings

| Pos | Driver | Points |
|---|---|---|
| 1 | (Italy) Emanuele Pirro | 91 |
| 2 | (Italy) Antonio Tamburini | 64 |
| 3 | (Italy) Rinaldo Capello | 54 |
| 4 | (Italy) Roberto Ravaglia | 39 |
| 5 | (Italy) Fabrizio Giovanardi | 37 |

Constructors' Championship standings

| Pos | Constructor | Points |
|---|---|---|
| 1 | (Germany) Audi | 91 |
| 2 | (Italy) Alfa Romeo | 82 |
| 3 | (Germany) BMW | 59 |
| 4 | (France) Peugeot | 45 |

== Round 4 (Italy) Binetto ==
Qualifying

| Pos | No | Driver | Car | Lap Time | Top Qualifying |
|---|---|---|---|---|---|
| 1 | 7 | (Venezuela) Johnny Cecotto | BMW 318iS | 49.480 | TQ |
| 2 | 12 | (Italy) Emanuele Pirro | Audi 80 Quattro | 49.568 | TQ |
| 3 | 3 | (Italy) Fabrizio Giovanardi | Peugeot 405 | 49.621 | TQ |
| 4 | 6 | (Italy) Antonio Tamburini | Alfa Romeo 155 | 49.656 | TQ |
| 5 | 9 | (Italy) Stefano Modena | Alfa Romeo 155 | 49.675 | TQ |
| 6 | 8 | (Germany) Alexander Burgstaller | BMW 318iS | 49.898 | TQ |
| 7 | 1 | (Italy) Roberto Ravaglia | BMW 318iS | 50.178 | TQ |
| 8 | 2 | (Italy) Emanuele Naspetti | BMW 318iS | 50.180 | TQ |
| 9 | 14 | (Italy) Rinaldo Capello | Audi 80 Quattro | 50.236 | TQ |
| 10 | 4 | (United Kingdom) Gary Ayles | Peugeot 405 | 50.365 | TQ |
| 11 | 5 | (Italy) Tamara Vidali | Alfa Romeo 155 | 49.500 | |
| 12 | 21 | (Italy) Amato Ferrari | Peugeot 405 | 49.502 | |
| 13 | 11 | (Italy) Marco Brand | Alfa Romeo 155 | 49.556 | |
| 14 | 59 | (Italy) Roberto Russo | Alfa Romeo 155 | 49.858 | |
| 15 | 55 | (Italy) Felice Tedeschi | Alfa Romeo 155 | 50.079 | |
| 16 | 51 | (Italy) Moreno Soli | Alfa Romeo 155 | 50.352 | |
| 17 | 56 | (Italy) Danilo Mozzi | Alfa Romeo 155 | 50.621 | |
| 18 | 52 | (Italy) Massimo Pigoli | Peugeot 405 | 50.660 | |
| 19 | 69 | (Italy) Onofrio Russo | Alfa Romeo 155 | 51.682 | |
| 20 | 53 | (Italy) Claudio Melotto | Peugeot 405 | 51.936 | |

Race 1

| Pos | No | Driver | Constructor | Time/Retired | Points |
|---|---|---|---|---|---|
| 1 | 12 | (Italy) Emanuele Pirro | Audi 80 Quattro | 34 laps in 28:53.860 | 20 |
| 2 | 3 | (Italy) Fabrizio Giovanardi | Peugeot 405 | +6.129s | 15 |
| 3 | 1 | (Italy) Roberto Ravaglia | BMW 318iS | +6.887s | 12 |
| 4 | 9 | (Italy) Stefano Modena | Alfa Romeo 155 | +13.108s | 10 |
| 5 | 2 | (Italy) Emanuele Naspetti | BMW 318iS | +13.309s | 8 |
| 6 | 6 | (Italy) Antonio Tamburini | Alfa Romeo 155 | +20.179s | 6 |
| 7 | 8 | (Germany) Alexander Burgstaller | BMW 318i | +25.135s | 4 |
| 8 | 11 | (Italy) Marco Brand | Alfa Romeo 155 | +30.476s | 3 |
| 9 | 21 | (Italy) Amato Ferrari | Peugeot 405 | +36.627s | 2 |
| 10 | 4 | (United Kingdom) Gary Ayles | Peugeot 405 | +42.253s | 1 |
| 11 | 59 | (Italy) Roberto Russo | Alfa Romeo 155 | +50.271s | |
| 12 | 55 | (Italy) Felice Tedeschi | Alfa Romeo 155 | +52.196s | |
| 13 | 52 | (Italy) Massimo Pigoli | Peugeot 405 | +1 lap | |
| 14 | 51 | (Italy) Moreno Soli | Alfa Romeo 155 | +2 laps | |
| 15 | 53 | (Italy) Claudio Melotto | Peugeot 405 | +2 laps | |
| 16 | 7 | (Venezuela) Johnny Cecotto | BMW 318i | +2 laps | |
| 17 | 56 | (Italy) Danilo Mozzi | Alfa Romeo 155 | +3 laps | |
| 18 | 5 | (Italy) Tamara Vidali | Alfa Romeo 155 | +5 laps | |
| 19 | 14 | (Italy) Rinaldo Capello | Audi 80 Quattro | +12 laps | |
| DNF | 69 | (Italy) Onofrio Russo | Alfa Romeo 155 | +20 laps | |

- Fastest Lap: Emanuele Pirro in 49.960 on lap 4

Race 2

| Pos | No | Driver | Constructor | Time/Retired | Points |
|---|---|---|---|---|---|
| 1 | 12 | (Italy) Emanuele Pirro | Audi 80 Quattro | 34 laps in 28:46.051 | 20 |
| 2 | 1 | (Italy) Roberto Ravaglia | BMW 318iS | +9.497s | 15 |
| 3 | 3 | (Italy) Fabrizio Giovanardi | Peugeot 405 | +17.357s | 12 |
| 4 | 2 | (Italy) Emanuele Naspetti | BMW 318iS | +17.759s | 10 |
| 5 | 7 | (Venezuela) Johnny Cecotto | BMW 318i | +20.555s | 8 |
| 6 | 11 | (Italy) Marco Brand | Alfa Romeo 155 | +39.350s | 6 |
| 7 | 21 | (Italy) Amato Ferrari | Peugeot 405 | +43.882s | 4 |
| 8 | 59 | (Italy) Roberto Russo | Alfa Romeo 155 | +1 lap | 3 |
| 9 | 52 | (Italy) Massimo Pigoli | Peugeot 405 | +1 lap | 2 |
| 10 | 55 | (Italy) Felice Tedeschi | Alfa Romeo 155 | +1 lap | 1 |
| 11 | 56 | (Italy) Danilo Mozzi | Alfa Romeo 155 | +2 laps | |
| 12 | 8 | (Germany) Alexander Burgstaller | BMW 318i | +2 laps | |
| 13 | 53 | (Italy) Claudio Melotto | Peugeot 405 | +3 laps | |
| 14 | 6 | (Italy) Antonio Tamburini | Alfa Romeo 155 | +5 laps | |
| 15 | 5 | (Italy) Tamara Vidali | Alfa Romeo 155 | +7 laps | |
| 16 | 9 | (Italy) Stefano Modena | Alfa Romeo 155 | +9 laps | |
| 17 | 51 | (Italy) Moreno Soli | Alfa Romeo 155 | +13 laps | |
| 18 | 14 | (Italy) Rinaldo Capello | Audi 80 Quattro | +16 laps | |
| DNF | 4 | (United Kingdom) Gary Ayles | Peugeot 405 | +20 laps | |
| DNF | 69 | (Italy) Onofrio Russo | Alfa Romeo 155 | +25 laps | |

- Fastest Lap: Emanuele Pirro in 49.918 on lap 7

=== Championship standings after Round 4 ===
Drivers' Championship standings

| Pos | Driver | Points |
|---|---|---|
| 1 | (Italy) Emanuele Pirro | 131 |
| 2 | (Italy) Antonio Tamburini | 70 |
| 3 | (Italy) Roberto Ravaglia | 66 |
| 4 | (Italy) Fabrizio Giovanardi | 64 |
| 5 | (Italy) Rinaldo Capello | 54 |

Constructors' Championship standings

| Pos | Constructor | Points |
|---|---|---|
| 1 | (Germany) Audi | 131 |
| 2 | (Italy) Alfa Romeo | 98 |
| 3 | (Germany) BMW | 86 |
| 4 | (France) Peugeot | 72 |

== Round 5 (Italy) Misano Adriatico ==
Qualifying

| Pos | No | Driver | Car | Lap Time | Top Qualifying |
|---|---|---|---|---|---|
| 1 | 6 | (Italy) Antonio Tamburini | Alfa Romeo 155 | 1.39.424 | TQ |
| 2 | 1 | (Italy) Roberto Ravaglia | BMW 318iS | 1.40.284 | TQ |
| 3 | 12 | (Italy) Emanuele Pirro | Audi 80 Quattro | 1.40.297 | TQ |
| 4 | 9 | (Italy) Stefano Modena | Alfa Romeo 155 | 1.40.353 | TQ |
| 5 | 3 | (Italy) Fabrizio Giovanardi | Peugeot 405 | 1.40.838 | TQ |
| 6 | 7 | (Venezuela) Johnny Cecotto | BMW 318iS | 1.41.358 | TQ |
| 7 | 8 | (Germany) Alexander Burgstaller | BMW 318iS | 1.42.119 | TQ |
| 8 | 4 | (United Kingdom) Gary Ayles | Peugeot 405 | 1.42.449 | TQ |
| 9 | 14 | (Italy) Rinaldo Capello | Audi 80 Quattro | 1.43.003 | TQ |
| 10 | 59 | (Italy) Roberto Russo | Alfa Romeo 155 | no time | TQ |
| 11 | 5 | (Italy) Tamara Vidali | Alfa Romeo 155 | 1.39.928 | |
| 12 | 11 | (Italy) Marco Brand | Alfa Romeo 155 | 1.39.972 | |
| 13 | 2 | (Italy) Emanuele Naspetti | BMW 318iS | 1.40.184 | |
| 14 | 55 | (Italy) Felice Tedeschi | Alfa Romeo 155 | 1.40.668 | |
| 15 | 51 | (Italy) Moreno Soli | Alfa Romeo 155 | 1.40.949 | |
| 16 | 56 | (Italy) Danilo Mozzi | Alfa Romeo 155 | 1.40.954 | |
| 17 | 52 | (Italy) Massimo Pigoli | Peugeot 405 | 1.41.792 | |
| 18 | 54 | (Italy) Maurizio Lusuardi | Peugeot 405 | 1.42.758 | |
| 19 | 53 | (Italy) Claudio Melotto | Peugeot 405 | 1.44.628 | |
| 20 | 58 | (Italy) Rocco Peduzzi | BMW 318iS | 1.44.942 | |
| 21 | 21 | (Italy) Amato Ferrari | Peugeot 405 | no time | |

Race 1

| Pos | No | Driver | Constructor | Time/Retired | Points |
|---|---|---|---|---|---|
| 1 | 6 | (Italy) Antonio Tamburini | Alfa Romeo 155 | 18 laps in 30:01.148 | 20 |
| 2 | 7 | (Venezuela) Johnny Cecotto | BMW 318i | +11.740s | 15 |
| 3 | 1 | (Italy) Roberto Ravaglia | BMW 318iS | +14.768s | 12 |
| 4 | 12 | (Italy) Emanuele Pirro | Audi 80 Quattro | +23.856s | 10 |
| 5 | 3 | (Italy) Fabrizio Giovanardi | Peugeot 405 | +26.241s | 8 |
| 6 | 8 | (Germany) Alexander Burgstaller | BMW 318i | +30.960s | 6 |
| 7 | 11 | (Italy) Marco Brand | Alfa Romeo 155 | +31.855s | 4 |
| 8 | 4 | (United Kingdom) Gary Ayles | Peugeot 405 | +32.753s | 3 |
| 9 | 14 | (Italy) Rinaldo Capello | Audi 80 Quattro | +33.220s | 2 |
| 10 | 59 | (Italy) Roberto Russo | Alfa Romeo 155 | +35.506s | 1 |
| 11 | 5 | (Italy) Tamara Vidali | Alfa Romeo 155 | +37.327s | |
| 12 | 51 | (Italy) Moreno Soli | Alfa Romeo 155 | +37.882s | |
| 13 | 55 | (Italy) Felice Tedeschi | Alfa Romeo 155 | +42.176s | |
| 14 | 2 | (Italy) Emanuele Naspetti | BMW 318iS | +44.368s | |
| 15 | 21 | (Italy) Amato Ferrari | Peugeot 405 | +1.10.415s | |
| 16 | 54 | (Italy) Maurizio Lusuardi | Peugeot 405 | +1.29.801s | |
| 17 | 58 | (Italy) Rocco Peduzzi | BMW 318iS | +1.35.986s | |
| 18 | 56 | (Italy) Danilo Mozzi | Alfa Romeo 155 | +1 lap | |
| 19 | 52 | (Italy) Massimo Pigoli | Peugeot 405 | +1 lap | |
| 20 | 53 | (Italy) Claudio Melotto | Peugeot 405 | +4 laps | |
| 21 | 9 | (Italy) Stefano Modena | Alfa Romeo 155 | +5 laps | |

- Fastest Lap: Stefano Modena in 1.38.975 on lap 5

Race 2

| Pos | No | Driver | Constructor | Time/Retired | Points |
|---|---|---|---|---|---|
| 1 | 6 | (Italy) Antonio Tamburini | Alfa Romeo 155 | 18 laps in 30:04.409 | 20 |
| 2 | 1 | (Italy) Roberto Ravaglia | BMW 318iS | +6.174s | 15 |
| 3 | 7 | (Venezuela) Johnny Cecotto | BMW 318i | +6.656s | 12 |
| 4 | 12 | (Italy) Emanuele Pirro | Audi 80 Quattro | +10.211s | 10 |
| 5 | 3 | (Italy) Fabrizio Giovanardi | Peugeot 405 | +21.741s | 8 |
| 6 | 8 | (Germany) Alexander Burgstaller | BMW 318i | +22.977s | 6 |
| 7 | 21 | (Italy) Amato Ferrari | Peugeot 405 | +34.614s | 4 |
| 8 | 51 | (Italy) Moreno Soli | Alfa Romeo 155 | +35.117s | 3 |
| 9 | 11 | (Italy) Marco Brand | Alfa Romeo 155 | +46.166s | 2 |
| 10 | 52 | (Italy) Massimo Pigoli | Peugeot 405 | +1.01.997s | 1 |
| 11 | 54 | (Italy) Maurizio Lusuardi | Peugeot 405 | +1.10.713s | |
| 12 | 58 | (Italy) Rocco Peduzzi | BMW 318iS | +1.32.074s | |
| 13 | 53 | (Italy) Claudio Melotto | Peugeot 405 | +1.32.939s | |
| 14 | 5 | (Italy) Tamara Vidali | Alfa Romeo 155 | +1 lap | |
| 15 | 14 | (Italy) Rinaldo Capello | Audi 80 Quattro | +1 lap | |
| 16 | 56 | (Italy) Danilo Mozzi | Alfa Romeo 155 | +1 lap | |
| 17 | 55 | (Italy) Felice Tedeschi | Alfa Romeo 155 | +2 laps | |
| 18 | 4 | (United Kingdom) Gary Ayles | Peugeot 405 | +7 laps | |
| 19 | 59 | (Italy) Roberto Russo | Alfa Romeo 155 | +8 laps | |
| DNF | 2 | (Italy) Emanuele Naspetti | BMW 318iS | +10 laps | |
| DNS | 9 | (Italy) Stefano Modena | Alfa Romeo 155 | | |

- Fastest Lap: Antonio Tamburini in 1.39.075 on lap 3

=== Championship standings after Round 5 ===
Drivers' Championship standings

| Pos | Driver | Points |
|---|---|---|
| 1 | (Italy) Emanuele Pirro | 151 |
| 2 | (Italy) Antonio Tamburini | 110 |
| 3 | (Italy) Roberto Ravaglia | 93 |
| 4 | (Italy) Fabrizio Giovanardi | 80 |
| 5 | (Italy) Rinaldo Capello | 56 |

Constructors' Championship standings

| Pos | Constructor | Points |
|---|---|---|
| 1 | (Germany) Audi | 151 |
| 2 | (Italy) Alfa Romeo | 138 |
| 3 | (Germany) BMW | 116 |
| 4 | (France) Peugeot | 88 |

== Round 6 (Italy) Vallelunga ==
Qualifying

| Pos | No | Driver | Car | Lap Time | Top Qualifying |
|---|---|---|---|---|---|
| 1 | 9 | (Italy) Stefano Modena | Alfa Romeo 155 | 1.18.654 | TQ |
| 2 | 6 | (Italy) Antonio Tamburini | Alfa Romeo 155 | 1.18.940 | TQ |
| 3 | 1 | (Italy) Roberto Ravaglia | BMW 318iS | 1.18.989 | TQ |
| 4 | 12 | (Italy) Emanuele Pirro | Audi 80 Quattro | 1.19.059 | TQ |
| 5 | 2 | (Italy) Emanuele Naspetti | BMW 318iS | 1.19.147 | TQ |
| 6 | 14 | (Italy) Rinaldo Capello | Audi 80 Quattro | 1.19.299 | TQ |
| 7 | 3 | (Italy) Fabrizio Giovanardi | Peugeot 405 | 1.19.502 | TQ |
| 8 | 7 | (Venezuela) Johnny Cecotto | BMW 318iS | 1.19.521 | TQ |
| 9 | 8 | (Germany) Alexander Burgstaller | BMW 318iS | 1.19.855 | TQ |
| 10 | 5 | (Italy) Tamara Vidali | Alfa Romeo 155 | 1.20.206 | TQ |
| 11 | 55 | (Italy) Felice Tedeschi | Alfa Romeo 155 | 1.19.591 | |
| 12 | 4 | (United Kingdom) Gary Ayles | Peugeot 405 | 1.19.738 | |
| 13 | 21 | (Italy) Amato Ferrari | Peugeot 405 | 1.19.804 | |
| 14 | 11 | (Italy) Marco Brand | Alfa Romeo 155 | 1.19.940 | |
| 15 | 51 | (Italy) Moreno Soli | Alfa Romeo 155 | 1.20.135 | |
| 16 | 59 | (Italy) Roberto Russo | Alfa Romeo 155 | 1.20.564 | |
| 17 | 61 | (Italy) Mauro Trione | Alfa Romeo 155 | 1.20.637 | |
| 18 | 56 | (Italy) Danilo Mozzi | Alfa Romeo 155 | 1.20.858 | |
| 19 | 52 | (Italy) Massimo Pigoli | Peugeot 405 | 1.21.195 | |
| 20 | 53 | (Italy) Claudio Melotto | Peugeot 405 | 1.22.614 | |
| 21 | 54 | (Italy) Maurizio Lusuardi | Peugeot 405 | 1.22.633 | |
| 22 | 58 | (Italy) Rocco Peduzzi | BMW 318iS | 1.22.750 | |

Race 1

| Pos | No | Driver | Constructor | Time/Retired | Points |
|---|---|---|---|---|---|
| 1 | 9 | (Italy) Stefano Modena | Alfa Romeo 155 | 18 laps in 24:19.407 | 20 |
| 2 | 12 | (Italy) Emanuele Pirro | Audi 80 Quattro | +2.101s | 15 |
| 3 | 14 | (Italy) Rinaldo Capello | Audi 80 Quattro | +12.674s | 12 |
| 4 | 6 | (Italy) Antonio Tamburini | Alfa Romeo 155 | +15.376s | 10 |
| 5 | 7 | (Venezuela) Johnny Cecotto | BMW 318i | +22.035s | 8 |
| 6 | 3 | (Italy) Fabrizio Giovanardi | Peugeot 405 | +23.554s | 6 |
| 7 | 5 | (Italy) Tamara Vidali | Alfa Romeo 155 | +30.151s | 4 |
| 8 | 4 | (United Kingdom) Gary Ayles | Peugeot 405 | +32.972 | 3 |
| 9 | 11 | (Italy) Marco Brand | Alfa Romeo 155 | +36.261s | 2 |
| 10 | 21 | (Italy) Amato Ferrari | Peugeot 405 | +38.848s | 1 |
| 11 | 51 | (Italy) Moreno Soli | Alfa Romeo 155 | +39.973s | |
| 12 | 52 | (Italy) Massimo Pigoli | Peugeot 405 | +56.903s | |
| 13 | 58 | (Italy) Rocco Peduzzi | BMW 318i | +1.15.815s | |
| 14 | 1 | (Italy) Roberto Ravaglia | BMW 318iS | +3 laps | |
| 15 | 54 | (Italy) Maurizio Lusuardi | Peugeot 405 | +4 laps | |
| 16 | 55 | (Italy) Felice Tedeschi | Alfa Romeo 155 | +7 laps | |
| 17 | 61 | (Italy) Mauro Trione | Alfa Romeo 155 | +9 laps | |
| DNF | 56 | (Italy) Danilo Mozzi | Alfa Romeo 155 | +11 laps | |
| DNF | 53 | (Italy) Claudio Melotto | Peugeot 405 | +12 laps | |
| DNF | 2 | (Italy) Emanuele Naspetti | BMW 318iS | +14 laps | |
| DNF | 8 | (Germany) Alexander Burgstaller | BMW 318i | +14 laps | |
| DNF | 59 | (Italy) Roberto Russo | Alfa Romeo 155 | +15 laps | |

- Fastest Lap: Emanuele Pirro in 1.19.724 on lap 17

Race 2

| Pos | No | Driver | Constructor | Time/Retired | Points |
|---|---|---|---|---|---|
| 1 | 12 | (Italy) Emanuele Pirro | Audi 80 Quattro | 20 laps in 26:52.398 | 20 |
| 2 | 9 | (Italy) Stefano Modena | Alfa Romeo 155 | +3.168s | 15 |
| 3 | 14 | (Italy) Rinaldo Capello | Audi 80 Quattro | +6.445s | 12 |
| 4 | 7 | (Venezuela) Johnny Cecotto | BMW 318i | +6.848s | 10 |
| 5 | 3 | (Italy) Fabrizio Giovanardi | Peugeot 405 | +17.316s | 8 |
| 6 | 1 | (Italy) Roberto Ravaglia | BMW 318iS | +19.597s | 6 |
| 7 | 2 | (Italy) Emanuele Naspetti | BMW 318iS | +27.527s | 4 |
| 8 | 4 | (United Kingdom) Gary Ayles | Peugeot 405 | +30.204s | 3 |
| 9 | 5 | (Italy) Tamara Vidali | Alfa Romeo 155 | +32.751s | 2 |
| 10 | 51 | (Italy) Moreno Soli | Alfa Romeo 155 | +40.816s | 1 |
| 11 | 11 | (Italy) Marco Brand | Alfa Romeo 155 | +40.844s | |
| 12 | 21 | (Italy) Amato Ferrari | Peugeot 405 | +42.891s | |
| 13 | 52 | (Italy) Massimo Pigoli | Peugeot 405 | +54.314s | |
| 14 | 56 | (Italy) Danilo Mozzi | Alfa Romeo 155 | +1.13.248s | |
| 15 | 58 | (Italy) Rocco Peduzzi | BMW 318iS | +1.17.429s | |
| 16 | 61 | (Italy) Mauro Trione | Alfa Romeo 155 | +10 laps | |
| DNF | 55 | (Italy) Felice Tedeschi | Alfa Romeo 155 | +12 laps | |
| DNF | 6 | (Italy) Antonio Tamburini | Alfa Romeo 155 | +17 laps | |
| DNF | 54 | (Italy) Maurizio Lusuardi | Peugeot 405 | +19 laps | |
| DNS | 53 | (Italy) Claudio Melotto | Peugeot 405 | | |
| DNS | 59 | (Italy) Roberto Russo | Alfa Romeo 155 | | |
| DNS | 8 | (Germany) Alexander Burgstaller | BMW 318iS | | |

- Fastest Lap: Roberto Ravaglia in 1.19.687 on lap 10

=== Championship standings after Round 6 ===
Drivers' Championship standings

| Pos | Driver | Points |
|---|---|---|
| 1 | (Italy) Emanuele Pirro | 186 |
| 2 | (Italy) Antonio Tamburini | 120 |
| 3 | (Italy) Roberto Ravaglia | 99 |
| 4 | (Italy) Fabrizio Giovanardi | 94 |
| 5 | (Italy) Rinaldo Capello | 80 |

Constructors' Championship standings

| Pos | Constructor | Points |
|---|---|---|
| 1 | (Germany) Audi | 186 |
| 2 | (Italy) Alfa Romeo | 173 |
| 3 | (Germany) BMW | 134 |
| 4 | (France) Peugeot | 102 |

== Round 7 (Italy) Mugello ==
Qualifying

| Pos | No | Driver | Car | Lap Time | Top Qualifying |
|---|---|---|---|---|---|
| 1 | 1 | (Italy) Roberto Ravaglia | BMW 318iS | 2.00.500 | TQ |
| 2 | 6 | (Italy) Antonio Tamburini | Alfa Romeo 155 | 2.00.514 | TQ |
| 3 | 9 | (Italy) Stefano Modena | Alfa Romeo 155 | 2.00.813 | TQ |
| 4 | 2 | (Italy) Emanuele Naspetti | BMW 318iS | 2.00.938 | TQ |
| 5 | 12 | (Italy) Emanuele Pirro | Audi 80 Quattro | 2.01.229 | TQ |
| 6 | 3 | (Italy) Fabrizio Giovanardi | Peugeot 405 | 2.01.283 | TQ |
| 7 | 7 | (Venezuela) Johnny Cecotto | BMW 318iS | 2.01.563 | TQ |
| 8 | 18 | (Germany) Frank Biela | Audi 80 Quattro | 2.02.375 | TQ |
| 9 | 5 | (Italy) Tamara Vidali | Alfa Romeo 155 | 2.02.565 | TQ |
| 10 | 8 | (Germany) Alexander Burgstaller | BMW 318iS | 2.03.223 | TQ |
| 11 | 14 | (Italy) Rinaldo Capello | Audi 80 Quattro | 2.01.173 | |
| 12 | 21 | (Italy) Amato Ferrari | Peugeot 405 | 2.01.833 | |
| 13 | 4 | (United Kingdom) Gary Ayles | Peugeot 405 | 2.01.921 | |
| 14 | 11 | (Italy) Marco Brand | Alfa Romeo 155 | 2.02.013 | |
| 15 | 55 | (Italy) Felice Tedeschi | Alfa Romeo 155 | 2.02.334 | |
| 16 | 51 | (Italy) Moreno Soli | Alfa Romeo 155 | 2.02.334 | |
| 17 | 56 | (Italy) Danilo Mozzi | Alfa Romeo 155 | 2.02.247 | |
| 18 | 52 | (Italy) Massimo Pigoli | Peugeot 405 | 2.03.928 | |
| 19 | 58 | (Italy) Rocco Peduzzi | BMW 318iS | 2.04.502 | |
| 20 | 62 | (Italy) Gianluca Roda | Alfa Romeo 155 | 2.05.605 | |
| 21 | 53 | (Italy) Claudio Melotto | Peugeot 405 | 2.05.831 | |
| 22 | 54 | (Italy) Maurizio Lusuardi | Peugeot 405 | 2.06.395 | |

Race 1

| Pos | No | Driver | Constructor | Time/Retired | Points |
|---|---|---|---|---|---|
| 1 | 1 | (Italy) Roberto Ravaglia | BMW 318iS | 15 laps in 30:52.251 | 20 |
| 2 | 9 | (Italy) Stefano Modena | Alfa Romeo 155 | +7.162s | 15 |
| 3 | 6 | (Italy) Antonio Tamburini | Alfa Romeo 155 | +10.650s | 12 |
| 4 | 12 | (Italy) Emanuele Pirro | Audi 80 Quattro | +11.305s | 10 |
| 5 | 7 | (Venezuela) Johnny Cecotto | BMW 318i | +13.369s | 8 |
| 6 | 3 | (Italy) Fabrizio Giovanardi | Peugeot 405 | +20.020s | 6 |
| 7 | 5 | (Italy) Tamara Vidali | Alfa Romeo 155 | +20.464s | 4 |
| 8 | 14 | (Italy) Rinaldo Capello | Audi 80 Quattro | +30.585s | 3 |
| 9 | 18 | (Germany) Frank Biela | Audi 80 Quattro | +31.346s | 2 |
| 10 | 11 | (Italy) Marco Brand | Alfa Romeo 155 | +51.929s | 1 |
| 11 | 4 | (United Kingdom) Gary Ayles | Peugeot 405 | +52.283s | |
| 12 | 56 | (Italy) Danilo Mozzi | Alfa Romeo 155 | +57.125s | |
| 13 | 21 | (Italy) Amato Ferrari | Peugeot 405 | +57.920s | |
| 14 | 55 | (Italy) Felice Tedeschi | Alfa Romeo 155 | +58.328s | |
| 15 | 52 | (Italy) Massimo Pigoli | Peugeot 405 | +1.07.466s | |
| 16 | 54 | (Italy) Maurizio Lusuardi | Peugeot 405 | +1.47.997s | |
| 17 | 53 | (Italy) Claudio Melotto | Peugeot 405 | +1.51.559s | |
| 18 | 2 | (Italy) Emanuele Naspetti | BMW 318iS | +1 lap | |
| 19 | 8 | (Germany) Alexander Burgstaller | BMW 318i | +1 lap | |
| 20 | 62 | (Italy) Gianluca Roda | Alfa Romeo 155 | +3 laps | |
| DNF | 58 | (Italy) Rocco Peduzzi | BMW 318i | +8 laps | |
| DNF | 51 | (Italy) Moreno Soli | Alfa Romeo 155 | +13 laps | |

- Fastest Lap: Roberto Ravaglia in 2.02.330 on lap 5

Race 2

| Pos | No | Driver | Constructor | Time/Retired | Points |
|---|---|---|---|---|---|
| 1 | 9 | (Italy) Stefano Modena | Alfa Romeo 155 | 15 laps 30:48.713 | 20 |
| 2 | 12 | (Italy) Emanuele Pirro | Audi 80 Quattro | +1.439s | 15 |
| 3 | 1 | (Italy) Roberto Ravaglia | BMW 318iS | +2.342s | 12 |
| 4 | 7 | (Venezuela) Johnny Cecotto | BMW 318i | +12.120s | 10 |
| 5 | 14 | (Italy) Rinaldo Capello | Audi 80 Quattro | +26.319s | 8 |
| 6 | 18 | (Germany) Frank Biela | Audi 80 Quattro | +29.355s | 6 |
| 7 | 11 | (Italy) Marco Brand | Alfa Romeo 155 | +32.902s | 4 |
| 8 | 5 | (Italy) Tamara Vidali | Alfa Romeo 155 | +42.553s | 3 |
| 9 | 21 | (Italy) Amato Ferrari | Peugeot 405 | +51.252s | 2 |
| 10 | 56 | (Italy) Danilo Mozzi | Alfa Romeo 155 | +1.25.024s | 1 |
| 11 | 58 | (Italy) Rocco Peduzzi | BMW 318iS | +1.43.221s | |
| 12 | 53 | (Italy) Claudio Melotto | Peugeot 405 | +1.50.377s | |
| 13 | 51 | (Italy) Moreno Soli | Alfa Romeo 155 | +2 laps | |
| 14 | 62 | (Italy) Gianluca Roda | Alfa Romeo 155 | +2 laps | |
| 15 | 3 | (Italy) Fabrizio Giovanardi | Peugeot 405 | +7 laps | |
| DNF | 4 | (United Kingdom) Gary Ayles | Peugeot 405 | +11 laps | |
| DNF | 52 | (Italy) Massimo Pigoli | Peugeot 405 | +11 laps | |
| DNF | 2 | (Italy) Emanuele Naspetti | BMW 318iS | +14 laps | |
| DNF | 6 | (Italy) Antonio Tamburini | Alfa Romeo 155 | +15 laps | |
| DNF | 55 | (Italy) Felice Tedeschi | Alfa Romeo 155 | +15 laps | |
| DNF | 54 | (Italy) Maurizio Lusuardi | Peugeot 405 | +15 laps | |
| DNF | 8 | (Germany) Alexander Burgstaller | BMW 318iS | +15 laps | |

- Fastest Lap: Stefano Modena in 2.02.470 on lap 4

=== Championship standings after Round 7 ===
Drivers' Championship standings

| Pos | Driver | Points |
|---|---|---|
| 1 | (Italy) Emanuele Pirro | 211 |
| 2 | (Italy) Antonio Tamburini | 132 |
| 3 | (Italy) Roberto Ravaglia | 131 |
| 4 | (Italy) Stefano Modena | 114 |
| 5 | (Italy) Fabrizio Giovanardi | 100 |

Constructors' Championship standings

| Pos | Constructor | Points |
|---|---|---|
| 1 | (Germany) Audi | 211 |
| 2 | (Italy) Alfa Romeo | 208 |
| 3 | (Germany) BMW | 166 |
| 4 | (France) Peugeot | 110 |

== Round 8 (Italy) Pergusa ==
Qualifying

| Pos | No | Driver | Car | Lap Time | Top Qualifying |
|---|---|---|---|---|---|
| 1 | 6 | (Italy) Antonio Tamburini | Alfa Romeo 155 | 1.41.398 | TQ |
| 2 | 3 | (Italy) Fabrizio Giovanardi | Peugeot 405 | 1.41.459 | TQ |
| 3 | 7 | (Venezuela) Johnny Cecotto | BMW 318iS | 1.41.766 | TQ |
| 4 | 1 | (Italy) Roberto Ravaglia | BMW 318iS | 1.41.801 | TQ |
| 5 | 18 | (Germany) Frank Biela | Audi 80 Quattro | 1.42.195 | TQ |
| 6 | 2 | (Italy) Emanuele Naspetti | BMW 318iS | 1.42.447 | TQ |
| 7 | 12 | (Italy) Emanuele Pirro | Audi 80 Quattro | 1.42.811 | TQ |
| 8 | 8 | (Germany) Alexander Burgstaller | BMW 318iS | 1.42.851 | TQ |
| 9 | 21 | (Italy) Amato Ferrari | Peugeot 405 | 1.43.498 | TQ |
| 10 | 14 | (Italy) Rinaldo Capello | Audi 80 Quattro | 1.43.682 | TQ |
| 11 | 24 | (Italy) Stefano Buttiero | Alfa Romeo 155 | 1.43.112 | |
| 12 | 19 | (Italy) Giuseppe Gabbiani | Alfa Romeo 155 | 1.43.239 | |
| 13 | 5 | (Italy) Tamara Vidali | Alfa Romeo 155 | 1.43.501 | |
| 14 | 51 | (Italy) Moreno Soli | Alfa Romeo 155 | 1.44.955 | |
| 15 | 56 | (Italy) Danilo Mozzi | Alfa Romeo 155 | 1.45.370 | |
| 16 | 58 | (Italy) Rocco Peduzzi | BMW 318iS | 1.45.790 | |

Race 1

| Pos | No | Driver | Constructor | Time/Retired | Points |
|---|---|---|---|---|---|
| 1 | 6 | (Italy) Antonio Tamburini | Alfa Romeo 155 | 17 laps in 29:27.366 | 20 |
| 2 | 7 | (Venezuela) Johnny Cecotto | BMW 318i | +0.900s | 15 |
| 3 | 3 | (Italy) Fabrizio Giovanardi | Peugeot 405 | +13.570s | 12 |
| 4 | 12 | (Italy) Emanuele Pirro | Audi 80 Quattro | +21.492s | 10 |
| 5 | 24 | (Italy) Stefano Buttiero | Alfa Romeo 155 | +24.433s | 8 |
| 6 | 8 | (Germany) Alexander Burgstaller | BMW 318i | +25.450s | 6 |
| 7 | 14 | (Italy) Rinaldo Capello | Audi 80 Quattro | +26.142s | 4 |
| 8 | 2 | (Italy) Emanuele Naspetti | BMW 318iS | +45.510s | 3 |
| 9 | 21 | (Italy) Amato Ferrari | Peugeot 405 | +49.848s | 2 |
| 10 | 18 | (Germany) Frank Biela | Audi 80 Quattro | +49.914s | 1 |
| 11 | 51 | (Italy) Moreno Soli | Alfa Romeo 155 | +54.963s | |
| 12 | 56 | (Italy) Danilo Mozzi | Alfa Romeo 155 | +1.09.592s | |
| 13 | 58 | (Italy) Rocco Peduzzi | BMW 318i | +1.32.891s | |
| 14 | 5 | (Italy) Tamara Vidali | Alfa Romeo 155 | +7 laps | |
| DNF | 11 | (Italy) Giuseppe Gabbiani | Alfa Romeo 155 | +14 laps | |
| DNF | 1 | (Italy) Roberto Ravaglia | BMW 318iS | +15 laps | |

- Fastest Lap: Johnny Cecotto in 1.42.953 on lap 9

Race 2

| Pos | No | Driver | Constructor | Time/Retired | Points |
|---|---|---|---|---|---|
| 1 | 6 | (Italy) Antonio Tamburini | Alfa Romeo 155 | 18 laps in 31:15.665 | 20 |
| 2 | 1 | (Italy) Roberto Ravaglia | BMW 318iS | +1.661s | 15 |
| 3 | 14 | (Italy) Rinaldo Capello | Audi 80 Quattro | +3.234s | 12 |
| 4 | 12 | (Italy) Emanuele Pirro | Audi 80 Quattro | +13.339s | 10 |
| 5 | 24 | (Italy) Stefano Buttiero | Alfa Romeo 155 | +23.789s | 8 |
| 6 | 3 | (Italy) Fabrizio Giovanardi | Peugeot 405 | +31.259s | 6 |
| 7 | 5 | (Italy) Tamara Vidali | Alfa Romeo 155 | +34.307s | 4 |
| 8 | 8 | (Germany) Alexander Burgstaller | BMW 318iS | +35.224s | 3 |
| 9 | 2 | (Italy) Emanuele Naspetti | BMW 318iS | +43.094s | 2 |
| 10 | 58 | (Italy) Rocco Peduzzi | BMW 318iS | +1.48.207s | 1 |
| 11 | 51 | (Italy) Moreno Soli | Alfa Romeo 155 | +6 laps | |
| DNF | 7 | (Venezuela) Johnny Cecotto | BMW 318i | +15 laps | |
| DSQ | 18 | (Germany) Frank Biela | Audi 80 Quattro | +16 laps | |
| DNF | 19 | (Italy) Giuseppe Gabbiani | Alfa Romeo 155 | +17 laps | |
| DNF | 21 | (Italy) Amato Ferrari | Peugeot 405 | +17 laps | |
| DNF | 56 | (Italy) Danilo Mozzi | Alfa Romeo 155 | +17 laps | |

- Fastest Lap: Fabrizio Giovanardi in 1.42.819 on lap 4

=== Championship standings after Round 8 ===
Drivers' Championship standings

| Pos | Driver | Points |
|---|---|---|
| 1 | (Italy) Emanuele Pirro | 231 |
| 2 | (Italy) Antonio Tamburini | 172 |
| 3 | (Italy) Roberto Ravaglia | 146 |
| 4 | (Italy) Fabrizio Giovanardi | 118 |
| 5 | (Italy) Stefano Modena | 114 |

Constructors' Championship standings

| Pos | Constructor | Points |
|---|---|---|
| 1 | (Italy) Alfa Romeo | 248 |
| 2 | (Germany) Audi | 233 |
| 3 | (Germany) BMW | 196 |
| 4 | (France) Peugeot | 128 |

== Round 9 (Italy) Varano De Melegari ==
Qualifying

| Pos | No | Driver | Car | Lap Time | Top Qualifying |
|---|---|---|---|---|---|
| 1 | 18 | (Germany) Frank Biela | Audi 80 Quattro | 49.504 | TQ |
| 2 | 14 | (Italy) Rinaldo Capello | Audi 80 Quattro | 49.838 | TQ |
| 3 | 7 | (Venezuela) Johnny Cecotto | BMW 318iS | 49.980 | TQ |
| 4 | 1 | (Italy) Roberto Ravaglia | BMW 318iS | 50.001 | TQ |
| 5 | 12 | (Italy) Emanuele Pirro | Audi 80 Quattro | 50.205 | TQ |
| 6 | 5 | (Italy) Tamara Vidali | Alfa Romeo 155 | 50.259 | TQ |
| 7 | 8 | (Germany) Alexander Burgstaller | BMW 318iS | 50.343 | TQ |
| 8 | 6 | (Italy) Antonio Tamburini | Alfa Romeo 155 | 50.343 | TQ |
| 9 | 3 | (Italy) Fabrizio Giovanardi | Peugeot 405 | 51.024 | TQ |
| 10 | 21 | (Italy) Amato Ferrari | Peugeot 405 | 51.040 | TQ |
| 11 | 2 | (Italy) Emanuele Naspetti | BMW 318iS | 50.111 | |
| 12 | 24 | (Italy) Stefano Buttiero | Alfa Romeo 155 | 50.120 | |
| 13 | 4 | (United Kingdom) Gary Ayles | Peugeot 405 | 50.298 | |
| 14 | 11 | (Italy) Marco Brand | Alfa Romeo 155 | 50.467 | |
| 15 | 59 | (Italy) Roberto Russo | Alfa Romeo 155 | 50.610 | |
| 16 | 51 | (Italy) Moreno Soli | Alfa Romeo 155 | 50.622 | |
| 17 | 57 | (Italy) Marco Antonelli | Alfa Romeo 155 | 50.630 | |
| 18 | 52 | (Italy) Massimo Pigoli | Peugeot 405 | 51.351 | |
| 19 | 58 | (Italy) Rocco Peduzzi | BMW 318iS | 51.475 | |
| 20 | 64 | (Switzerland) Felipe Ortiz | Peugeot 405 | 52.701 | |
| 21 | 54 | (Italy) Maurizio Lusuardi | Peugeot 405 | 53.118 | |
| 22 | 56 | (Italy) Danilo Mozzi | Alfa Romeo 155 | 54.287 | |
| 23 | 62 | (Italy) Gianluca Roda | Alfa Romeo 155 | 1.00.937 | |

Race 1

| Pos | No | Driver | Constructor | Time/Retired | Points |
|---|---|---|---|---|---|
| 1 | 18 | (Germany) Frank Biela | Audi 80 Quattro | 30 laps in 29:37.392 | 20 |
| 2 | 12 | (Italy) Emanuele Pirro | Audi 80 Quattro | +26.042s | 15 |
| 3 | 3 | (Italy) Fabrizio Giovanardi | Peugeot 405 | +43.129s | 12 |
| 4 | 11 | (Italy) Marco Brand | Alfa Romeo 155 | +58.407s | 10 |
| 5 | 6 | (Italy) Antonio Tamburini | Alfa Romeo 155 | +59.105s | 8 |
| 6 | 21 | (Italy) Amato Ferrari | Peugeot 405 | +1 lap | 6 |
| 7 | 5 | (Italy) Tamara Vidali | Alfa Romeo 155 | +1 lap | 4 |
| 8 | 58 | (Italy) Rocco Peduzzi | BMW 318i | +1 lap | 3 |
| 9 | 59 | (Italy) Roberto Russo | Alfa Romeo 155 | +1 lap | 2 |
| 10 | 54 | (Italy) Maurizio Lusuardi | Peugeot 405 | +2 laps | 1 |
| 11 | 51 | (Italy) Moreno Soli | Alfa Romeo 155 | +2 laps | |
| 12 | 64 | (Switzerland) Felipe Ortiz | Peugeot 405 | +2 laps | |
| 13 | 8 | (Germany) Alexander Burgstaller | BMW 318i | +2 laps | |
| 14 | 2 | (Italy) Emanuele Naspetti | BMW 318iS | +2 laps | |
| 15 | 7 | (Venezuela) Jhonny Cecotto | BMW 318i | +2 laps | |
| 16 | 62 | (Italy) Gianluca Roda | Alfa Romeo 155 | +3 laps | |
| 17 | 56 | (Italy) Danilo Mozzi | Alfa Romeo 155 | +3 laps | |
| 18 | 14 | (Italy) Rinaldo Capello | Audi 80 Quattro | +5 laps | |
| 19 | 24 | (Italy) Stefano Buttiero | Alfa Romeo 155 | +7 laps | |
| DNF | 4 | (United Kingdom) Gary Ayles | Peugeot 405 | +20 laps | |
| DNF | 57 | (Italy) Marco Antonelli | Alfa Romeo 155 | +22 laps | |
| DNF | 52 | (Italy) Massimo Pigoli | Peugeot 405 | +24 laps | |
| DNF | 1 | (Italy) Roberto Ravaglia | BMW 318iS | +25 laps | |

- Fastest Lap: Frank Biela 58.097 on lap 13

Race 2

| Pos | No | Driver | Constructor | Time/Retired | Points |
|---|---|---|---|---|---|
| 1 | 18 | (Germany) Frank Biela | Audi 80 Quattro | 30 laps in 28:55.106 | 20 |
| 2 | 12 | (Italy) Emanuele Pirro | Audi 80 Quattro | +38.465s | 15 |
| 3 | 14 | (Italy) Rinaldo Capello | Audi 80 Quattro | +44.312s | 12 |
| 4 | 58 | (Italy) Rocco Peduzzi | BMW 318iS | +1 lap | 10 |
| 5 | 57 | (Italy) Marco Antonelli | Alfa Romeo 155 | +1 lap | 8 |
| 6 | 3 | (Italy) Fabrizio Giovanardi | Peugeot 405 | +1 lap | 6 |
| 7 | 7 | (Venezuela) Johnny Cecotto | BMW 318i | +1 lap | 4 |
| 8 | 52 | (Italy) Massimo Pigoli | Peugeot 405 | +1 lap | 3 |
| 9 | 8 | (Germany) Alexander Burgstaller | BMW 318iS | +1 lap | 2 |
| 10 | 6 | (Italy) Antonio Tamburini | Alfa Romeo 155 | +1 lap | 1 |
| 11 | 24 | (Italy) Stefano Buttiero | Alfa Romeo 155 | +1 lap | |
| 12 | 11 | (Italy) Marco Brand | Alfa Romeo 155 | +1 lap | |
| 13 | 51 | (Italy) Moreno Soli | Alfa Romeo 155 | +1 lap | |
| 14 | 4 | (United Kingdom) Gary Ayles | Peugeot 405 | +2 laps | |
| 15 | 59 | (Italy) Roberto Russo | Alfa Romeo 155 | +2 laps | |
| 16 | 56 | (Italy) Danilo Mozzi | Alfa Romeo 155 | +3 laps | |
| 17 | 5 | (Italy) Tamara Vidali | Alfa Romeo 155 | +3 laps | |
| 18 | 21 | (Italy) Amato Ferrari | Peugeot 405 | +11 laps | |
| 19 | 54 | (Italy) Maurizio Lusuardi | Peugeot 405 | +15 laps | |
| DNF | 2 | (Italy) Emanuele Naspetti | BMW 318iS | +17 laps | |
| DNF | 62 | (Italy) Gianluca Roda | Alfa Romeo 155 | +21 laps | |
| DNF | 64 | (Switzerland) Felipe Ortiz | Peugeot 405 | +23 laps | |
| DNF | 1 | (Italy) Roberto Ravaglia | BMW 318iS | +24 laps | |

- Fastest Lap: Frank Biela 55.914 on lap 30

=== Championship standings after Round 9 ===
Drivers' Championship standings

| Pos | Driver | Points |
|---|---|---|
| 1 | (Italy) Emanuele Pirro | 261 |
| 2 | (Italy) Antonio Tamburini | 181 |
| 3 | (Italy) Roberto Ravaglia | 146 |
| 4 | (Italy) Fabrizio Giovanardi | 136 |
| 5 | (Italy) Rinaldo Capello | 119 |

Constructors' Championship standings

| Pos | Constructor | Points |
|---|---|---|
| 1 | (Germany) Audi | 273 |
| 2 | (Italy) Alfa Romeo | 266 |
| 3 | (Germany) BMW | 209 |
| 4 | (France) Peugeot | 146 |

== Round 10 (Italy) Mugello ==
Qualifying

| Pos | No | Driver | Car | Lap Time | Top Qualifying |
|---|---|---|---|---|---|
| 1 | 18 | (Germany) Frank Biela | Audi 80 Quattro | 1.59.114 | TQ |
| 2 | 1 | (Italy) Roberto Ravaglia | BMW 318iS | 1.59.417 | TQ |
| 3 | 12 | (Italy) Emanuele Pirro | Audi 80 Quattro | 1.59.513 | TQ |
| 4 | 14 | (Italy) Rinaldo Capello | Audi 80 Quattro | 1.59.612 | TQ |
| 5 | 3 | (Italy) Fabrizio Giovanardi | Peugeot 405 | 1.59.841 | TQ |
| 6 | 6 | (Italy) Antonio Tamburini | Alfa Romeo 155 | 1.59.857 | TQ |
| 7 | 2 | (Italy) Emanuele Naspetti | BMW 318iS | 2.00.037 | TQ |
| 8 | 9 | (Italy) Stefano Modena | Alfa Romeo 155 | 2.00.037 | TQ |
| 9 | 21 | (Italy) Amato Ferrari | Peugeot 405 | 2.00.577 | TQ |
| 10 | 7 | (Venezuela) Johnny Cecotto | BMW 318iS | 2.00.878 | TQ |
| 11 | 5 | (Italy) Tamara Vidali | Alfa Romeo 155 | 2.00.477 | |
| 12 | 4 | (United Kingdom) Gary Ayles | Peugeot 405 | 2.00.547 | |
| 13 | 11 | (Italy) Marco Brand | Alfa Romeo 155 | 2.00.593 | |
| 14 | 8 | (Germany) Alexander Burgstaller | BMW 318iS | 2.00.621 | |
| 15 | 51 | (Italy) Moreno Soli | Alfa Romeo 155 | 2.01.794 | |
| 16 | 56 | (Italy) Danilo Mozzi | Alfa Romeo 155 | 2.02.362 | |
| 17 | 55 | (Italy) Felice Tedeschi | Alfa Romeo 155 | 2.02.443 | |
| 22 | 62 | (Italy) Roberto Russo | Alfa Romeo 155 | 2.02.745 | |
| 19 | 52 | (Italy) Massimo Pigoli | Peugeot 405 | 2.03.455 | |
| 20 | 64 | (Switzerland) Felipe Ortiz | Peugeot 405 | 2.04.816 | |
| 21 | 54 | (Italy) Maurizio Lusuardi | Peugeot 405 | 2.05.568 | |
| 22 | 62 | (Italy) Gianluca Roda | Alfa Romeo 155 | 2.11.024 | |

Race 1

| Pos | No | Driver | Constructor | Time/Retired | Points |
|---|---|---|---|---|---|
| 1 | 2 | (Italy) Emanuele Naspetti | BMW 318iS | 15 laps in 34:57.244 | 20 |
| 2 | 3 | (Italy) Fabrizio Giovanardi | Peugeot 405 | +0.573s | 15 |
| 3 | 14 | (Italy) Rinaldo Capello | Audi 80 Quattro | +1.847s | 12 |
| 4 | 7 | (Venezuela) Johnny Cecotto | BMW 318i | +9.434s | 10 |
| 5 | 11 | (Italy) Marco Brand | Alfa Romeo 155 | +22.058s | 8 |
| 6 | 8 | (Germany) Alexander Burgstaller | BMW 318i | +31.889s | 6 |
| 7 | 21 | (Italy) Amato Ferrari | Peugeot 405 | +48.367s | 4 |
| 8 | 5 | (Italy) Tamara Vidali | Alfa Romeo 155 | +55.895s | 3 |
| 9 | 18 | (Germany) Frank Biela | Audi 80 Quattro | +56.180s | 2 |
| 10 | 12 | (Italy) Emanuele Pirro | Audi 80 Quattro | +1.17.298s | 1 |
| 11 | 51 | (Italy) Moreno Soli | Alfa Romeo 155 | +1.21.819s | |
| 12 | 56 | (Italy) Danilo Mozzi | Alfa Romeo 155 | +1.36.882s | |
| 13 | 52 | (Italy) Massimo Pigoli | Peugeot 405 | +1.46.310s | |
| 14 | 62 | (Italy) Gianluca Roda | Alfa Romeo 155 | +1.50.979s | |
| 15 | 64 | (Switzerland) Felipe Ortiz | Peugeot 405 | +1.57.763s | |
| 16 | 54 | (Italy) Maurizio Lusuardi | Peugeot 405 | +2.10.568s | |
| 17 | 55 | (Italy) Felice Tedeschi | Alfa Romeo 155 | +3 laps | |
| 18 | 59 | (Italy) Roberto Russo | Alfa Romeo 155 | +8 laps | |
| DNF | 9 | (Italy) Stefano Modena | Alfa Romeo 155 | +14 laps | |
| DNF | 6 | (Italy) Antonio Tamburini | Alfa Romeo 155 | +14 laps | |
| DNF | 1 | (Italy) Roberto Ravaglia | BMW 318iS | +15 laps | |
| DNS | 4 | (United Kingdom) Gary Ayles | Peugeot 405 | | |

- Fastest Lap: Rinaldo Capello 2.16.951 on lap 14

Race 2

| Pos | No | Driver | Constructor | Time/Retired | Points |
|---|---|---|---|---|---|
| 1 | 14 | (Italy) Rinaldo Capello | Audi 80 Quattro | 9 laps in 21:25.136 | 10 |
| 2 | 12 | (Italy) Emanuele Pirro | Audi 80 Quattro | +5.897s | 7,5 |
| 3 | 18 | (Germany) Frank Biela | Audi 80 Quattro | +17.017s | 6 |
| 4 | 3 | (Italy) Fabrizio Giovanardi | Peugeot 405 | +50.724s | 5 |
| 5 | 8 | (Germany) Alexander Burgstaller | BMW 318iS | +59.695s | 4 |
| 6 | 5 | (Italy) Tamara Vidali | Alfa Romeo 155 | +1.00.661s | 3 |
| 7 | 9 | (Italy) Stefano Modena | Alfa Romeo 155 | +1.21.015s | 2 |
| 8 | 51 | (Italy) Moreno Soli | Alfa Romeo 155 | +1.32.161s | 1,5 |
| 9 | 6 | (Italy) Antonio Tamburini | Alfa Romeo 155 | +1.38.622s | 1 |
| 10 | 62 | (Italy) Gianluca Roda | Alfa Romeo 155 | +1.56.877s | 0,5 |
| 11 | 4 | (United Kingdom) Gary Ayles | Peugeot 405 | +2.03.809s | |
| 12 | 52 | (Italy) Massimo Pigoli | Peugeot 405 | +2.45.764s | |
| 13 | 64 | (Switzerland) Felipe Ortiz | Peugeot 405 | +1 lap | |
| 14 | 54 | (Italy) Maurizio Lusuardi | Peugeot 405 | +1 lap | |
| 15 | 2 | (Italy) Emanuele Naspetti | BMW 318iS | +4 laps | |
| 16 | 21 | (Italy) Amato Ferrari | Peugeot 405 | +4 laps | |
| DNF | 55 | (Italy) Felice Tedeschi | Alfa Romeo 155 | +7 laps | |
| DNF | 1 | (Italy) Roberto Ravaglia | BMW 318iS | +8 laps | |
| DNF | 11 | (Italy) Marco Brand | Alfa Romeo 155 | +9 laps | |
| DNF | 56 | (Italy) Danilo Mozzi | Alfa Romeo 155 | +9 laps | |
| DNS | 7 | (Venezuela) Johnny Cecotto | BMW 318i | | |
| DNS | 59 | (Italy) Roberto Russo | Alfa Romeo 155 | | |

- Fastest Lap: Emanuele Pirro 2.21.207 on lap 5

=== Championship standings after Round 10 ===
Drivers' Championship standings

| Pos | Driver | Points |
|---|---|---|
| 1 | (Italy) Emanuele Pirro | 267,5 |
| 2 | (Italy) Antonio Tamburini | 182 |
| 3 | (Italy) Fabrizio Giovanardi | 156 |
| 4 | (Italy) Roberto Ravaglia | 146 |
| 5 | (Italy) Rinaldo Capello | 141 |

Constructors' Championship standings

| Pos | Constructor | Points |
|---|---|---|
| 1 | (Germany) Audi | 295 |
| 2 | (Italy) Alfa Romeo | 277 |
| 3 | (Germany) BMW | 233 |
| 4 | (France) Peugeot | 166 |

== Championship standings ==
Points system
| **1st** | **2nd** | **3rd** | **4th** | **5th** | **6th** | **7th** | **8th** | **9th** | **10th** |
| 20 | 15 | 12 | 10 | 8 | 6 | 4 | 3 | 2 | 1 |

- 18 results from 20 are valid for the championship

=== Drivers' Championship ===
| Pos | Driver | Car | MON (Italy) | | VAL (Italy) | | MAG (Italy) | | BIN (Italy) | | MIS (Italy) | | VAL (Italy) | | MUG (Italy) | | PER (Italy) | | VAR (Italy) | | MUG (Italy) | | Pts |
|---|---|---|---|---|---|---|---|---|---|---|---|---|---|---|---|---|---|---|---|---|---|---|---|
| 1 | (Italy) Emanuele Pirro | Audi | 2 | 2 | (10) | 1 | 1 | **1** | 1 | **1** | 4 | 4 | 2 | 1 | 4 | 2 | 4 | 4 | 2 | 2 | (10) | 2 | **267,5** (269,5) |
| 2 | (Italy) Antonio Tamburini | Alfa Romeo | **1** | **1** | 3 | 10 | 8 | 5 | 6 | 14 | **1** | **1** | 4 | Ret | 3 | Ret | **1** | **1** | 5 | 10 | Ret | 9 | **182** |
| 3 | (Italy) Fabrizio Giovanardi | Peugeot | 8 | 11 | 2 | 8 | 7 | 3 | 2 | 3 | 5 | 5 | 6 | 5 | 6 | 15† | 3 | 6 | 3 | 6 | 2 | 4 | **156** |
| 4 | (Italy) Roberto Ravaglia | BMW | 16 | 6 | 20 | 6 | 3 | 2 | 3 | 2 | 3 | 2 | 14 | 6 | **1** | **3** | Ret | 2 | Ret | Ret | Ret | Ret | **146** |
| 5 | (Italy) Rinaldo Capello | Audi | 3 | 3 | 18 | 2 | 2 | Ret | 19† | 18† | 9 | 15 | 3 | 3 | 8 | 5 | 7 | 3 | 18 | 3 | 3 | 1 | **141** |
| 6 | (Italy) Stefano Modena | Alfa Romeo | 15 | 4 | **1** | **7** | **Ret** | DNS | 4 | 16† | 21† | DNS | 1 | **2** | 2 | 1 | | | | | Ret | 7 | **116** |
| 7 | (Venezuela) Johnny Cecotto | BMW | | | | | 9 | 4 | **16** | 5 | 2 | 3 | 5 | 4 | 5 | 4 | 2 | Ret | 15 | 7 | 4 | DNS | **112** |
| 8 | (Germany) Alexander Burgstaller | BMW | 4 | 8 | 7 | 3 | 6 | 11 | 7 | 12 | 6 | 6 | Ret | DNS | 18 | DNS | 6 | 8 | 13 | 9 | 6 | 5 | **72** |
| 9 | (Italy) Emanuele Naspetti | BMW | 14 | 7 | 15 | 14 | 5 | 16 | 5 | 4 | 14 | Ret | Ret | 7 | 17 | Ret | 8 | 9 | 14 | Ret | 1 | **15†** | **59** |
| 10 | (Italy) Tamara Vidali | Alfa Romeo | 5 | 5 | 9 | 12 | 4 | 7 | 18† | 15† | 11 | 14 | 7 | 9 | 7 | 8 | 14† | 7 | 7 | 17 | 8 | 6 | **59** |
| 11 | (Germany) Frank Biela | Audi | | | | | | | | | | | | | 9 | 6 | 10 | DSQ | **1** | **1** | **9** | 3 | **57** |
| 12 | (Italy) Marco Brand | Alfa Romeo | Ret | DNS | 17† | Ret | Ret | 12 | 8 | 6 | 7 | 9 | 9 | 11 | DSQ | 7 | | | 4 | 12 | 5 | Ret | **39** |
| 13 | (Italy) Amato Ferrari | Peugeot | 19† | 13 | 5 | 13 | Ret | 10 | 9 | 7 | 15 | 7 | 10 | 12 | 12 | 9 | 9 | Ret | 6 | 18† | 7 | 16† | **34** |
| 14 | (United Kingdom) Gary Ayles | Peugeot | 6 | 12 | 6 | 9 | 10 | 9 | 10 | Ret | 8 | 18† | 8 | 8 | 10 | DSQ | | | Ret | 14 | DNS | 11 | **28** |
| 15 | (Italy) Stefano Buttiero | Alfa Romeo | | | | | | | | | | | | | | | 5 | 5 | 19† | 11 | | | **16** |
| 16 | (Italy) Rocco Peduzzi | BMW | | | | | | | | | 17 | 12 | 13 | 15 | Ret | 11 | 13 | 10 | 8 | 4 | | | **14** |
| 17 | (Italy) Massimo Pigoli | Peugeot | 11 | 16 | 13 | 5 | 14 | 14 | 13 | 9 | 19 | 10 | 12 | 13 | 14 | Ret | | | Ret | 8 | 13 | 12 | **14** |
| 18 | (Italy) Felice Tedeschi | Alfa Romeo | 17 | Ret | 4 | Ret | | | 12 | 10 | 13 | 17 | 16† | Ret | 13 | Ret | | | | | 17 | Ret | **11** |
| 19 | (Italy) Giovanni Bonanno | Alfa Romeo | 7 | 10 | | | 11 | 6 | | | | | | | | | | | | | | | **11** |
| 20 | (Germany) Altfrid Heger | BMW | | | Ret | 4 | | | | | | | | | | | | | | | | | **10** |
| 21 | (Italy) Marco Antonelli | Alfa Romeo | | | | | | | | | | | | | | | | | Ret | 5 | | | **8** |
| 22 | (Italy) Enrico Bertaggia | Alfa Romeo | Ret | DNS | 8 | Ret | 12 | 8 | | | | | | | | | | | | | | | **6** |
| 23 | (Italy) Roberto Russo | Alfa Romeo | | | | | | | 11 | 8 | 10 | 19† | Ret | DNS | | | | | 9 | 15 | 18† | DNS | **6** |
| 24 | (Italy) Moreno Soli | Alfa Romeo | 18 | Ret | 12 | 11 | 13 | 13 | 14 | 17† | 12 | 8 | 11 | 10 | Ret | 13 | 11 | 11 | 11 | 13 | 11 | 8 | **5,5** |
| 25 | (Italy) Danilo Mozzi | Alfa Romeo | 9 | 14 | 11 | 17 | | | 17 | 11 | 18 | 16 | Ret | 14 | 11 | 10 | 12 | Ret | 17 | 16 | 12 | Ret | **3** |
| 26 | (Germany) Joachim Winkelhock | BMW | 10 | 9 | | | | | | | | | | | | | | | | | | | **3** |
| 27 | (Italy) Maurizio Lusuardi | Peugeot | 12 | 15 | 16 | 15 | 15 | 15 | | | 16 | 11 | 15 | Ret | 15 | Ret | | | 10 | 19† | 16 | 14 | **1** |
| 28 | (Italy) Gianluca Roda | Alfa Romeo | | | | | | | | | | | | | 19 | 14 | | | 16 | Ret | 14 | 10 | **0,5** |
| | (Italy) Claudio Melotto | Peugeot | 13 | Ret | 14 | 16 | Ret | Ret | 15 | 13 | 20 | 13 | Ret | Ret | 16 | 12 | | | | | | | **0** |
| | (Switzerland) Felipe Ortiz | Peugeot | | | | | | | | | | | | | | | | | 12 | Ret | 15 | 13 | **0** |
| | (Italy) Giuseppe Gabbiani | Alfa Romeo | | | | | | | | | | | | | | | Ret | Ret | | | | | **0** |
| | (Italy) Mauro Trione | Alfa Romeo | | | | | | | | | | | 17† | 16† | | | | | | | | | **0** |
| | (Italy) Onofrio Russo | Alfa Romeo | | | | | | | Ret | Ret | | | | | | | | | | | | | **0** |
| | (Italy) Massimiliano Crinelli | BMW | | | 19 | Ret | | | | | | | | | | | | | | | | | **0** |
| Pos | Driver | Car | MON (Italy) | | VAL (Italy) | | MAG (Italy) | | BIN (Italy) | | MIS (Italy) | | VAL (Italy) | | MUG (Italy) | | PER (Italy) | | VAR (Italy) | | MUG (Italy) | | Pts |

| Colour | Result |
|---|---|
| Gold | Winner |
| Silver | Second place |
| Bronze | Third place |
| Green | Points classification |
| Blue | Non-points classification |
| Blue | Non-classified finish (NC) |
| Purple | Retired, not classified (Ret) |
| Red | Did not qualify (DNQ) |
| Red | Did not pre-qualify (DNPQ) |
| Black | Disqualified (DSQ) |
| White | Did not start (DNS) |
| White | Withdrew (WD) |
| White | Race cancelled (C) |
| Blank | Did not practice (DNP) |
| Blank | Did not arrive (DNA) |
| Blank | Excluded (EX) |

**Bold** – Pole
Italics – Fastest Lap

† Drivers did not finish the race, but were classified as they completed over 50% of the race distance.

- Race 2 of Round 10 in Mugello was stopped on lap 9 (of 15) due to heavy rain and half points were awarded.

=== Manufacturers' Trophy ===
| Pos | Manufacturer | MON (Italy) | | VAL (Italy) | | MAG (Italy) | | BIN (Italy) | | MIS (Italy) | | VAL (Italy) | | MUG (Italy) | | PER (Italy) | | VAR (Italy) | | MUG (Italy) | | Pts |
|---|---|---|---|---|---|---|---|---|---|---|---|---|---|---|---|---|---|---|---|---|---|---|
| 1 | (Germany) Audi | 2 | 2 | 10 | 1 | 1 | 1 | 1 | 1 | 4 | 4 | 2 | 1 | 4 | 2 | 4 | 3 | 1 | 1 | 3 | 1 | **295** |
| 2 | (Italy) Alfa Romeo | 1 | 1 | 1 | 7 | 4 | 5 | 4 | 6 | 1 | 1 | 1 | 2 | 2 | 1 | 1 | 1 | 4 | 7 | 5 | 6 | **277** |
| 3 | (Germany) BMW | 4 | 6 | 7 | 3 | 3 | 2 | 3 | 2 | 2 | 2 | 5 | 4 | 1 | 3 | 2 | 2 | 8 | 4 | 1 | 5 | **233** |
| 4 | (France) Peugeot | 6 | 11 | 2 | 5 | 7 | 3 | 2 | 3 | 5 | 5 | 6 | 5 | 6 | 9 | 3 | 6 | 3 | 6 | 2 | 4 | **166** |

=== Privateers' Trophy ===
| Pos | Driver | Car | MON (Italy) | | VAL (Italy) | | MAG (Italy) | | BIN (Italy) | | MIS (Italy) | | VAL (Italy) | | MUG (Italy) | | PER (Italy) | | VAR (Italy) | | MUG (Italy) | | Pts |
|---|---|---|---|---|---|---|---|---|---|---|---|---|---|---|---|---|---|---|---|---|---|---|---|
| 1 | (Italy) Moreno Soli | Alfa Romeo | | | 3 | 2 | 1 | 1 | 4 | | 2 | 1 | 1 | 1 | | 4 | 1 | | 4 | 4 | 1 | 1 | **232** |
| 2 | (Italy) Massimo Pigoli | Peugeot | 2 | 3 | 4 | 1 | 2 | 2 | 3 | 2 | 7 | 2 | 2 | 2 | 3 | | | | | 3 | 3 | 3 | **205** |
| 3 | (Italy) Danilo Mozzi | Alfa Romeo | 1 | 1 | 2 | 5 | | | 6 | 4 | 6 | 6 | | 3 | 1 | 1 | 2 | | 7 | 6 | 2 | | **183** |
| 4 | (Italy) Maurizio Lusuardi | Peugeot | 3 | 2 | 6 | 3 | 3 | 3 | | | 4 | 3 | 4 | | 4 | | | | 3 | | 6 | 5 | **133** |
| 5 | (Italy) Rocco Peduzzi | BMW | | | | | | | | | 5 | 4 | 3 | 4 | | 2 | 3 | 1 | 1 | 1 | | | **127** |
| 6 | (Italy) Roberto Russo | Alfa Romeo | | | | | | | 1 | 1 | 1 | | | | | | | | 2 | 5 | | | **83** |
| 7 | (Italy) Felice Tedeschi | Alfa Romeo | | | 1 | | | | 2 | 3 | 3 | 7 | | | 2 | | | | | | 7 | | **82** |
| 8 | (Italy) Claudio Melotto | Peugeot | 4 | | 5 | 4 | | | 5 | 5 | 8 | 5 | | | 5 | 3 | | | | | | | **75** |
| 9 | (Italy) Gianluca Roda | Alfa Romeo | | | | | | | | | | | | | 6 | 5 | | | 6 | | 4 | 2 | **37,5** |
| 10 | (Switzerland) Felipe Ortiz | Peugeot | | | | | | | | | | | | | | | | | 5 | | 5 | 4 | **21** |
| 11 | (Italy) Marco Antonelli | Alfa Romeo | | | | | | | | | | | | | | | | | | 2 | | | **15** |
| | (Italy) Mauro Trione | Alfa Romeo | | | | | | | | | | | | | | | | | | | | | 0 |
| | (Italy) Onofrio Russo | Alfa Romeo | | | | | | | | | | | | | | | | | | | | | 0 |
| Pos | Driver | Car | MUG (Italy) | | MAG (Italy) | | MON (Italy) | | BIN (Italy) | | MIS (Italy) | | IMO (Italy) | | PER (Italy) | | PER (Italy) | | VAR (Italy) | | VAL (Italy) | | Pts |
