= Stefano Buttiero =

Italian racing driver (born 1966)

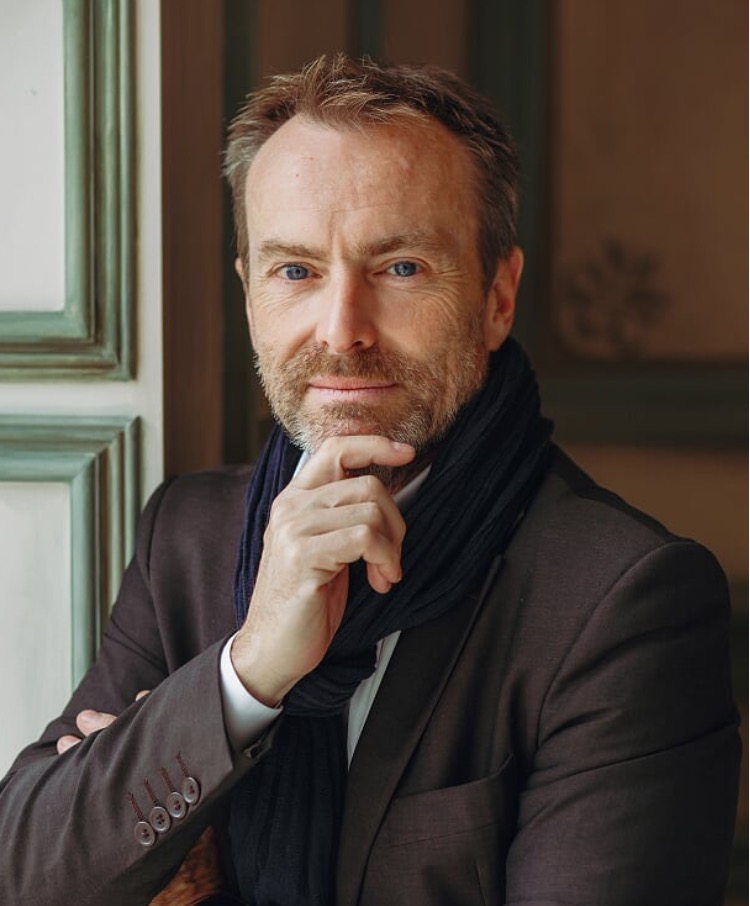

Stefano Buttiero (born July 5, 1966, Turin, Italy) is an Italian racing car driver who has competed in major races such as the Italian Touring Car Championship, Italian Formula Three Championship and the 24 Hours of Daytona, Road America 500, and American Le Mans Series and Grand Prix of Sonoma.
