= 1979 Finnish motorcycle Grand Prix =

Motorcycle race held in 1979 at the Imatra Circuit

(Finland) 1979 Finnish Grand Prix
Race details
- Race 10 of 13 races in the 1979 Grand Prix motorcycle racing season
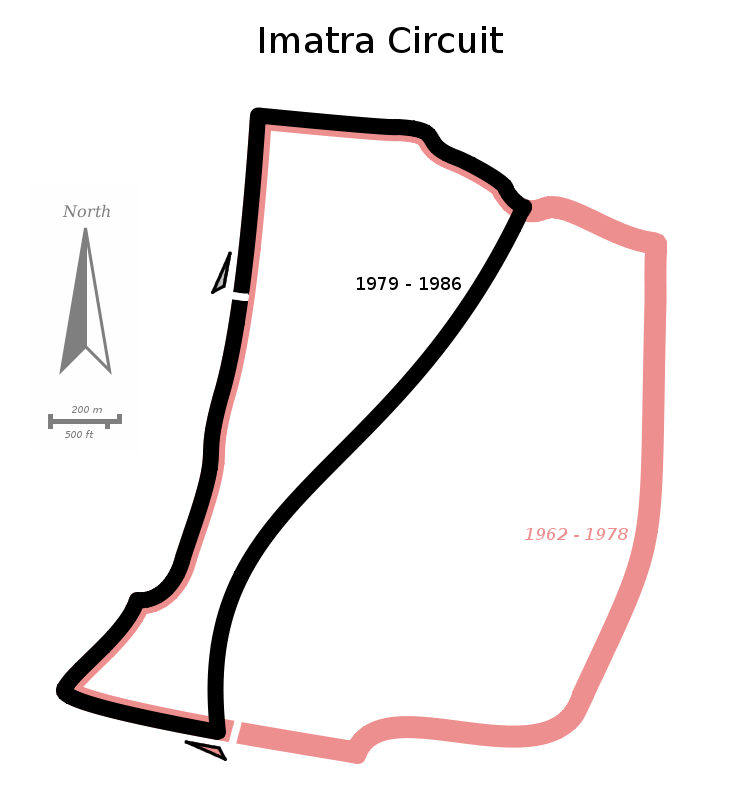
- Date: 29 July 1979
- Official name: Finnish GP
- Location: Imatra Circuit
- Course: Permanent racing facility; 4.950 km (3.076 mi)

500cc
Pole position
Rider	(Netherlands) Boet van Dulmen	Suzuki
Time	1:53.700	
Fastest lap
Rider	(Netherlands) Jack Middelburg	Suzuki
Time	1:57.000	
Podium
First	(Netherlands) Boet van Dulmen	Suzuki
Second	(United States) Randy Mamola	Suzuki
Third	(United Kingdom) Barry Sheene	Suzuki

350cc
Pole position
- Rider: (South Africa) Kork Ballington
- Time: 2:00.500
Fastest lap
- Rider: (Australia) Gregg Hansford
- Time: Unknown
Podium
- First: (Australia) Gregg Hansford
- Second: (France) Patrick Fernandez
- Third: (Finland) Pentti Korhonen

250cc
Pole position
- Rider: (West Germany) Anton Mang
- Time: 2:03.300
Fastest lap
- Rider: (Australia) Gregg Hansford
- Time: 2:10.300
Podium
- First: (South Africa) Kork Ballington
- Second: (Australia) Gregg Hansford
- Third: (France) Patrick Fernandez

125cc
Pole position
- Rider: (Switzerland) Stefan Dörflinger
- Time: 2:12.300
Fastest lap
- Rider: (Spain) Ricardo Tormo
- Time: 2:26.800
Podium
- First: (Spain) Ricardo Tormo
- Second: (Finland) Matti Kinnunen
- Third: (Switzerland) Hans Müller

50cc
Pole position
- Rider: No 50cc race was held
Fastest lap
- Rider: No 50cc race was held
Podium
- First: No 50cc race was held
- Second: No 50cc race was held
- Third: No 50cc race was held

The 1979 Finnish motorcycle Grand Prix was the tenth round of the 1979 Grand Prix motorcycle racing season. It took place on the weekend of 27-29 July 1979 at the Imatra Circuit.

== Classification ==
=== 500 cc ===
Pos.	Rider	Team	Manufacturer	Time/Retired	Points
1	(Netherlands) Boet van Dulmen		Suzuki	52'27.900	15
2	(United States) Randy Mamola	Serge Zago	Suzuki	+13.000	12
3	(United Kingdom) Barry Sheene	Texaco Heron Team Suzuki	Suzuki	+17.800	10
4	(Netherlands) Jack Middelburg		Suzuki	+18.000	8
5	(France) Christian Sarron	Team Sonauto Gauloises	Yamaha	+27.000	6
6	(United States) Kenny Roberts	Yamaha Motor Company	Yamaha	+35.000	5
7	(Venezuela) Johnny Cecotto	Yamaha Motor Company	Yamaha	+36.000	4
8	(Switzerland) Philippe Coulon		Suzuki	+45.200	3
9	(Italy) Marco Lucchinelli		Suzuki	+48.100	2
10	(Netherlands) Wil Hartog	Riemersma Racing	Suzuki	+51.800	1
11	(United Kingdom) Steve Parrish	Texaco Heron Team Suzuki	Suzuki	+1'43.500	
12	(Finland) Markku Matikainen		Suzuki	+1 lap	
13	(Sweden) Peter Sjöström	Ava MC Stockholm	Suzuki	+1 lap	
14	(West Germany) Gerhard Vogt	Bill Smith Racing	Suzuki	+1 lap	
15	(Italy) Virginio Ferrari	Team Gallina Nava Olio Fiat	Suzuki	+1 lap	
16	(Sweden) Peter Sköld		Suzuki	+1 lap	
Ret	(Italy) Franco Uncini	Team Zago International	Suzuki	Retired	
Ret	(Sweden) Lennart Backström		Suzuki	Retired	
Ret	(West Germany) Gustav Reiner	Dieter Braun Team	Suzuki	Accident	
Ret	(New Zealand) Dennis Ireland	Derry's Racing	Suzuki	Retired	
Ret	(Finland) Timo Pohjola		Suzuki	Retired	
Ret	(Finland) Kimmo Kopra		Yamaha	Retired	
Ret	(Italy) Graziano Rossi	Morbidelli	Morbidelli	Retired	
Ret	(Denmark) Børge Nielsen		Suzuki	Retired	
Ret	(Finland) Seppo Ojala		Suzuki	Retired	
Ret	(Netherlands) Willem Zoet	Stimorol Racing	Suzuki	Retired	
Ret	(France) Michel Rougerie		Suzuki	Retired	
Ret	(Finland) Seppo Rossi	Kouv MK	Suzuki	Retired	
Ret	(Austria) Max Wiener		Suzuki	Retired	
Ret	(Japan) Ikujiro Takai	Yamaha Motor Company	Yamaha	Accident	
DNQ	(Sweden) Bo Granath		Yamaha	Did not qualify	

Previous race: 1979 Swedish Grand Prix	FIM Grand Prix World Championship; 1979 season	Next race: 1979 British Grand Prix
Previous race: 1978 Finnish Grand Prix	Finnish Grand Prix	Next race: 1980 Finnish Grand Prix
