= 1979 Swedish motorcycle Grand Prix =

(Sweden) 1979 Swedish Grand Prix
Race details
- Race 9 of 13 races in the 1979 Grand Prix motorcycle racing season
- Date: 22 July 1979
- Official name: Grand Prix of Sweden 1979
- Location: Karlskoga Motorstadion
- Course: Permanent racing facility; 2.400 km (1.491 mi)

500cc
Pole position
- Rider: (United States) Kenny Roberts
- Time: 1:21.010
Fastest lap
- Rider: (Netherlands) Wil Hartog
- Time: 1:21.310
Podium
- First: (United Kingdom) Barry Sheene
- Second: (Netherlands) Jack Middelburg
- Third: (Netherlands) Boet van Dulmen

350cc
Pole position
- Rider: No 350cc race was held
Fastest lap
- Rider: No 350cc race was held
Podium
- First: No 350cc race was held
- Second: No 350cc race was held
- Third: No 350cc race was held

250cc
Pole position
- Rider: (Australia) Gregg Hansford
- Time: 1:23.970
Fastest lap
- Rider: (Australia) Gregg Hansford
- Time: 1:23.500
Podium
- First: (Italy) Graziano Rossi
- Second: (Australia) Gregg Hansford
- Third: (France) Patrick Fernandez

125cc
Pole position
- Rider: (Switzerland) Bruno Kneubühler
- Time: 1:29.950
Fastest lap
- Rider: (Germany) Gert Bender
- Time: 1:28.790
Podium
- First: (Italy) Pier Paolo Bianchi
- Second: (France) Jean-Louis Guignabodet
- Third: (France) Thierry Noblesse

50cc
Pole position
- Rider: No 50cc race was held
Fastest lap
- Rider: No 50cc race was held
Podium
- First: No 50cc race was held
- Second: No 50cc race was held
- Third: No 50cc race was held

The 1979 Swedish motorcycle Grand Prix was the ninth round of the 1979 Grand Prix motorcycle racing season. It took place on the weekend of 20–22 July 1979 at the Karlskoga Motorstadion in Karlskoga, Sweden.

== Classification ==
=== 500 cc ===
Pos.	Rider	Team	Manufacturer	Time/Retired	Points
1	(United Kingdom) Barry Sheene	Texaco Heron Team Suzuki	Suzuki	55'27.660	15
2	(Netherlands) Jack Middelburg		Suzuki	+4.960	12
3	(Netherlands) Boet van Dulmen		Suzuki	+7.060	10
4	(United States) Kenny Roberts	Yamaha Motor Company	Yamaha	+25.820	8
5	(United Kingdom) Steve Parrish	Texaco Heron Team Suzuki	Suzuki	+27.670	6
6	(United States) Randy Mamola	Serge Zago	Suzuki	+35.480	5
7	(Italy) Marco Lucchinelli		Suzuki	+1'04.140	4
8	(Japan) Ikujiro Takai	Yamaha Motor Company	Yamaha	+1'07.780	3
9	(France) Christian Sarron	Team Sonauto Gauloises	Yamaha	+1'08.020	2
10	(Finland) Seppo Rossi	Kouv MK	Suzuki	+1 lap	1
11	(Sweden) Lennart Backström		Suzuki	+1 lap	
12	(South Africa) Alan North	Wilddam Konserven Holland	Suzuki	+1 lap	
13	(Netherlands) Willem Zoet	Stimorol Racing	Suzuki	+1 lap	
Ret	(West Germany) Gustav Reiner	Dieter Braun Team	Suzuki	Retired	
Ret	(Switzerland) Philippe Coulon		Suzuki	Retired	
Ret	(Australia) Kenny Blake		Suzuki	Retired	
Ret	(Sweden) Erik Björn Paulsen		Suzuki	Retired	
Ret	(Sweden) Odd Arne Lande		Suzuki	Retired	
Ret	(Netherlands) Wil Hartog	Riemersma Racing	Suzuki	Accident	
Ret	(Italy) Graziano Rossi	Morbidelli	Morbidelli	Retired	
Ret	(Belgium) Didier de Radiguès		Yamaha	Retired	
Ret	(Sweden) Peter Sköld		Suzuki	Retired	
Ret	(Venezuela) Johnny Cecotto	Yamaha Motor Company	Yamaha	Retired	
Ret	(New Zealand) Dennis Ireland	Derry's Racing	Suzuki	Retired	
Ret	(Sweden) Peter Sjöström	Ava MC Stockholm	Suzuki	Retired	
Ret	(Denmark) Chris Fisker		Suzuki	Retired	
Ret	(United Kingdom) Tony Head		Yamaha	Retired	
Ret	(France) Michel Rougerie		Suzuki	Retired	
Ret	(Italy) Virginio Ferrari	Team Gallina Nava Olio Fiat	Suzuki	Retired	
Ret	(Italy) Franco Uncini	Team Zago International	Suzuki	Accident	
DNQ	(United Kingdom) Barry Woodland		Yamaha	Did not qualify	
DNQ	(Austria) Max Wiener		Suzuki	Did not qualify	

Previous race: 1979 Belgian Grand Prix	FIM Grand Prix World Championship; 1979 season	Next race: 1979 Finnish Grand Prix
Previous race: 1978 Swedish Grand Prix	Swedish Grand Prix	Next race: 1981 Swedish Grand Prix
