= 1979 Austrian motorcycle Grand Prix =

(Austria) 1979 Austrian Grand Prix
Race details
- Race 2 of 13 races in the 1979 Grand Prix motorcycle racing season
- Date: 29 April 1979
- Official name: Großer Preis von Österreich
- Location: Salzburgring
- Course: Permanent racing facility; 4.241 km (2.635 mi)

500cc
Pole position
- Rider: (Venezuela) Johnny Cecotto
- Time: 1:23.390
Fastest lap
- Rider: (United States) Kenny Roberts
- Time: 1:21.690
Podium
- First: (United States) Kenny Roberts
- Second: (Italy) Virginio Ferrari
- Third: (Netherlands) Wil Hartog

350cc
Pole position
- Rider: (Austria) Grunwald Harfmann
- Time: 1:30.750
Fastest lap
- Rider: (South Africa) Kork Ballington
- Time: 1:25.290
Podium
- First: (South Africa) Kork Ballington
- Second: (South Africa) Jon Ekerold
- Third: (West Germany) Anton Mang

125cc
Pole position
- Rider: (Spain) Ángel Nieto
- Time: 1:36.510
Fastest lap
- Rider: (Spain) Ángel Nieto
- Time: 1:32.730
Podium
- First: (Spain) Ángel Nieto
- Second: (Austria) Harald Bartol
- Third: (West Germany) Gert Bender

50cc
Pole position
- Rider: No 50cc race was held
Fastest lap
- Rider: No 50cc race was held
Podium
- First: No 50cc race was held
- Second: No 50cc race was held
- Third: No 50cc race was held

Sidecar (B2A)
Pole position
- Rider: (West Germany) Siegfried Schauzu
- Passenger: (West Germany) Lorenzo Puzo
- Time: 1:35.930
Fastest lap
- Rider: (United Kingdom) Dick Greasley
- Passenger: (United Kingdom) John Parkins
- Time: 1:31.860
Podium
- First rider: (Sweden) Göte Brodin
- First passenger: (Sweden) Billy Gällros
- Second rider: (West Germany) Siegfried Schauzu
- Second passenger: (West Germany) Lorenzo Puzo
- Third rider: (West Germany) Rolf Steinhausen
- Third passenger: (United Kingdom) Kenny Arthur

Sidecars (B2B)
Pole position
- Rider: (Switzerland) Rolf Biland
- Passenger: (Switzerland) Kurt Waltisperg
- Time: 1:30.960
- Passenger: (United Kingdom) Stu Collins
- Time: 1:31.600
Podium
- First rider: (Switzerland) Rolf Biland
- First passenger: (Switzerland) Kurt Waltisperg
- Second rider: (Switzerland) Bruno Holzer
- Second passenger: (Switzerland) Karl Meierhans
- Third rider: (Austria) Klaus Sprengel
- Third passenger: (United Kingdom) Derek Booth

The 1979 Austrian motorcycle Grand Prix was the second round of the 1979 Grand Prix motorcycle racing season. It took place on 29 April 1979 at the Salzburgring circuit.

== 500 cc classification ==
Pos.	Rider	Team	Manufacturer	Laps	Time	Grid	Points
1	(United States) Kenny Roberts	Yamaha Motor Company	Yamaha	35	48:24.23	4	15
2	(Italy) Virginio Ferrari	Team Gallina Nava Olio Fiat	Suzuki	35	+6.03	16	12
3	(Netherlands) Wil Hartog	Riemersma Racing	Suzuki	35	+18.81	8	10
4	(United Kingdom) Tom Herron	Texaco Heron Team Suzuki	Suzuki	35	+21.44	2	8
5	(Japan) Hiroyuki Kawasaki	Texaco Heron Team Suzuki	Suzuki	35	+22.96	5	6
6	(Italy) Franco Uncini	Team Zago International	Suzuki	35	+1:19.41	19	5
7	(United Kingdom) Steve Parrish	Texaco Heron Team Suzuki	Suzuki	35	+1:25.31	12	4
8	(Austria) Max Wiener		Suzuki	34	+1 lap	14	3
9	(Italy) Marco Lucchinelli		Suzuki	34	+1 lap		2
10	(United Kingdom) Mick Grant		Suzuki	34	+1 lap	13	1
11	(France) Bernard Fau	Suzuki France	Suzuki	34	+1 lap		
12	(United Kingdom) Barry Sheene	Texaco Heron Team Suzuki	Suzuki	34	+1 lap	6	
13	(United Kingdom) Alex George		Suzuki	34	+1 lap	7	
14	(United States) Mike Baldwin	Serge Zago	Suzuki	34	+1 lap		
15	(Netherlands) Jack Middelburg		Suzuki	34	+1 lap	10	
16	(South Africa) Alan North	Wilddam Konserven Holland	Suzuki	??	+1 lap	18	
17	(Sweden) Peter Sjöström	Ava MC Stockholm	Suzuki	??	+1 lap	??	
18	(New Zealand) Dennis Ireland	Derry's Racing	Suzuki	??	+1 lap	??	
19	(West Germany) Jurgen Steiner	Suzuki Deutschland	Suzuki	??	+1 lap	??	
20	(West Germany) Gustav Reiner	Dieter Braun Team	Suzuki	??	+1 lap	17	
21	(Austria) Richard Schulze		Suzuki	??	+1 lap	??	
22	(Finland) Seppo Rossi	Kouv MK	Suzuki	??	+1 lap	??	
23	(Austria) Michael Schmid		Suzuki	??	+1 lap	??	
Ret	(Netherlands) Boet van Dulmen		Suzuki		Retired	3	
Ret	(South Africa) Jon Ekerold		Yamaha		Retired	??	
Ret	(Switzerland) Philippe Coulon		Suzuki			9	
Ret	(France) Olivier Chevallier		Yamaha		Retired	??	
Ret	(Denmark) Børge Nielsen		Suzuki		Retired	??	
Ret	(Sweden) Bo Granath		Yamaha		Retired	??	
Ret	(Italy) Gianni Rolando	Scuderia Naldoni	Suzuki		Retired	11	
Ret	(Finland) Markku Matikainen		Suzuki		Retired	??	
Ret	(Venezuela) Johnny Cecotto	Yamaha Motor Company	Yamaha		Retired	1	
Ret	(Italy) Carlo Perugini	Suzuki		Retired	15		
Ret	(West Germany) Elmar Renner	Moto Team Krawehl	Suzuki		Retired	??	
Ret	(West Germany) Gerhard Vogt	Bill Smith Racing	Suzuki		Retired	??	
Ret	(Spain) Carlos Delgado de San Antonio		Suzuki		Retired	14	

Previous race: 1979 Venezuelan Grand Prix	FIM Grand Prix World Championship; 1979 season	Next race: 1979 German Grand Prix
Previous race: 1978 Austrian Grand Prix	Austrian Grand Prix	Next race: 1981 Austrian Grand Prix
