= Johnny Cecotto =

Venezuelan motorcycle racer and racing driver (born 1956)

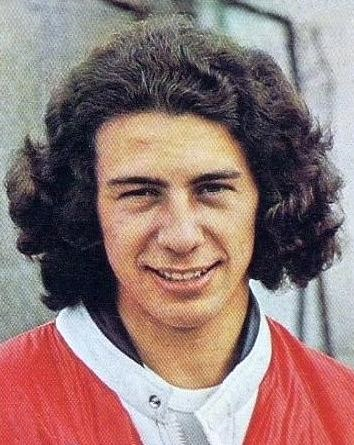
- Cecotto in 1978
- Nationality: Venezuelan
- Born: 25 January 1956 (age 70); Caracas, Venezuela
- Relatives: Johnny Cecotto Jr. (son)
Motorcycle racing career statistics
Grand Prix motorcycle racing
Active years	1975–1980
First race	1975 250cc French Grand Prix
Last race	1980 500cc German Grand Prix
First win	1975 250cc French Grand Prix
Last win	1980 350cc Nations Grand Prix
Team	Yamaha
Championships	1975 – 350cc 1978 – Formula 750
Starts / Wins / Podiums / Poles / F. laps / Points; 48 / 14 / 26 / 13 / 7 / 433

Formula One World Championship career
- Active years: 1983–1984
- Team(s): Theodore, Toleman
- Entries: 23 (18 starts)
- Championships: 0
- Wins: 0
- Podiums: 0
- Career points: 1
- Pole positions: 0
- Fastest laps: 0
- First entry: 1983 Brazilian Grand Prix
- Last entry: 1984 British Grand Prix

24 Hours of Le Mans career
- Years: 1981, 1996, 1998
- Teams: Team Bigazzi SRL, Team BMW Motorsport
- Best finish: 8th (1996)
- Class wins: 0

Johnny Alberto Cecotto Persello (born 25 January 1956), better known as Johnny Cecotto, is a Venezuelan former professional Grand Prix motorcycle racer and auto racer. He rose to prominence as a teenage prodigy in 1975 when he became the youngest motorcycle road racing world champion at the age of 19. Despite the auspicious beginning to his motorcycle racing career, he suffered numerous injuries and mechanical problems which curtailed his success in motorcycle Grand Prix racing.

At the age of 24, Cecotto turned his attention to auto racing where he reached the pinnacle of the sport as a Formula One driver. He later became a successful Touring Car racer. He is the last of a select group of competitors who competed at the highest level in motorcycle and auto racing, which includes John Surtees and Mike Hailwood among others.

== Motorcycle racing history ==
=== Early career ===
Cecotto was born in Caracas, Venezuela to Italian immigrant parents. His father was a motorcycle shop owner and former motorcycle racer who had won the Venezuelan national championship on a 500cc Norton. He followed his father's career path and began motorcycle racing at a young age, first competing on a Honda CB750 and a Kawasaki triple before gaining the support of the Venezuelan Yamaha importer.

Cecotto rode a Yamaha TZ350 to win the 1973 Venezuelan road racing national championship at the age of 17. After the death of Jarno Saarinen at the 1973 Nations Grand Prix, Cecotto adopted a new helmet color scheme with two pointed red stripes that was based on Saarinen's helmet colors, in honor of the fallen rider. He would keep the helmet design through the remainder of his career.

Cecotto successfully defended his title by reclaiming the Venezuelan national championship in 1974, and also won the 1974 South American motorcycle road racing championship, a one-race event held at the Interlagos Circuit near São Paulo, Brazil. In his first international racing outside of South America, he finished 35th overall at the Daytona 200 on a Yamaha 350cc, and suffered a mechanical failure after only five laps at the Imola 200.

=== Daytona success ===
Cecotto rose to international prominence at the 1975 Daytona 200 motorcycle race with one of the more inspired rides in the history of the event. At the time, the Daytona 200 was considered one of the most prestigious motorcycle races in the world, attracting world champions such as Giacomo Agostini and Barry Sheene. He arrived at Daytona as an unknown rookie aboard an unmodified Yamaha TZ750 sponsored by Venemotos, Yamaha's Venezuelan importer.

Cecotto promptly raised his profile by qualifying on the front row shared with pole-sitter Kenny Roberts, Gene Romero, Teuvo Lansivuori and Steve Baker. As Cecotto took his place on the starting grid, race officials noticed a puddle of fluid developing beneath his motorcycle. With the start of the race just moments away, the officials made the decision to remove Cecotto and his motorcycle from the grid for safety reasons. As the race was started without Cecotto, officials discovered that the fluid was only water overflowing from the radiator and posed no safety hazard.

Officials allowed Cecotto re-enter the race, but by then he was in last place. With an impressive display of riding ability, Cecotto passed half the field of competitors on the first lap alone. Two laps later, he was up to 26th place. By the fifth lap, he was in 18th place, and by the end of the tenth lap, he was in tenth place. On the 50th lap, he caught and passed Agostini for third place before his motorcycle began to overheat, forcing him to reduce his pace and settle for a third place behind the eventual winner Gene Romero and second place Steve Baker. On the event of the 50th anniversary of the Daytona 200 in 1991, the American Motorcyclist Association convened a panel of motorcycling press and former racers, who named Cecotto's accomplishment as the top performance in the first 50 years of the race.

=== World champion ===
One month after his Daytona performance, Cecotto traveled to Europe where he continued his meteoric rise with a victory at the prestigious Imola 200 F750-championship race after Agostini's engine seized while American champion Kenny Roberts withdrew due to a wrist injury.

Cecotto continued his impressive streak by scoring a double victory in the first world championship Grand Prix race of his career. At the season opening French Grand Prix held at the Paul Ricard Circuit, he set the fastest lap time en route to winning the 250cc race, and followed that performance by leading the 350cc race from start to finish to win by a 25-second margin over the seven-time 350cc world champion Agostini. He had originally planned to compete in two or three European events but, after his performance at the French Grand Prix, he gained full sponsorship for the remainder of the season aboard an ex-Agostini TZ350. Cecotto relegated Agostini to second place in France, Italy and Finland while Agostini only managed to defeat Cecotto once in Spain. He won the 1975 350cc World Championship at the age of nineteen to become the youngest ever FIM World Champion until Loris Capirossi won the 1990 125cc World Championship at the age of 17. He was competitive in the 250cc world championship with two victories and was leading in three other races; however, a crash at the German Grand Prix and then engine problems for his motorcycle left him in fourth place in the final standings, just two points behind Dieter Braun.

=== Later career ===
In 1976, Cecotto returned to the Daytona 200, now with full support from the Yamaha factory racing team. The race turned into a battle between Cecotto and his Yamaha teammate, Kenny Roberts. Their grueling pace proved too much for their tires and on the 33rd of the 52 laps Roberts slowed with a worn rear tire. Nine laps from the end, Roberts' tire blew apart, almost making him lose control before he limped back into the pits. Cecotto's pit crew attempted to wave him into the pits with three laps remaining to check on his tire, but he ignored their signal and continued on to win the race. Afterwards, his shredded tires showed how close he was to suffering the same fate as Roberts.

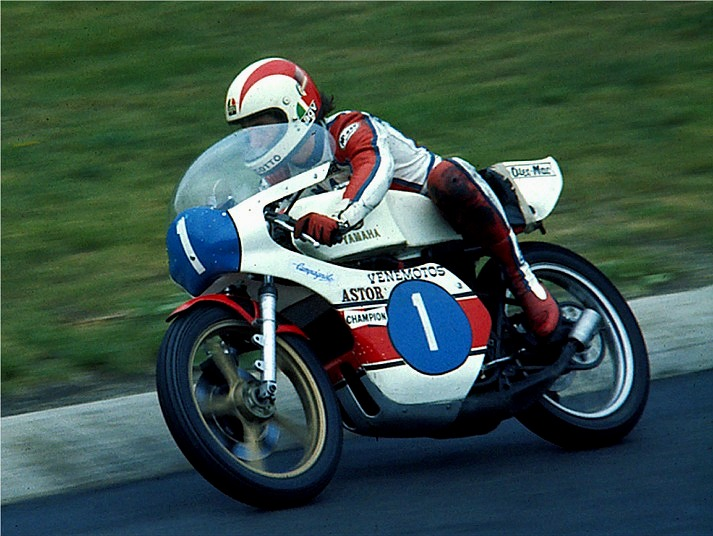
Johnny Cecotto at the Nürburgring in 1976

Cecotto had been offered a place on the Suzuki factory team for the 1976 500cc World Championship but, chose to remain loyal to his Venezuelan Yamaha satellite team, Venemotos. The Venemotos team competed in the 500 Class with Cecotto riding Agostini's 1975 Yamaha YZR500. Suzuki's Barry Sheene was expected to be his main competitor for the 1976 world championship.

He began the 1976 season with a promising second-place finish behind Sheene at the season-opening French Grand Prix, but struggled to come to grips with the Yamaha, falling 13 times in subsequent races. He failed to score any further points after the French round and shortly after the Italian Grand Prix, he gave up on the 500cc class completely to concentrate on defending his 350cc title. He finished the 500cc season in a disappointing 20th place as Sheene won the 500cc world championship. He also lost his 350cc crown in a tight battle with Harley-Davidson mounted Walter Villa.

While Cecotto possessed a natural riding ability, some observers speculated that he had won too early in his career without fully understanding how he had accomplished it. Yamaha Team Manager and former world champion Rod Gould said, "I think Cecotto was going fast and didn't really know why. Now he doesn't know why he's going slower and crashing." Cecotto's results were also affected by the Venemotos team's disorganization and lack of preparation. According to his Yamaha factory mechanic Vince French, on several occasions, the team failed to file official race entry forms or failed to secure garage space thus delaying vital practice time. On other occasions, the team failed to provide equipment required by race organizers causing further delays.

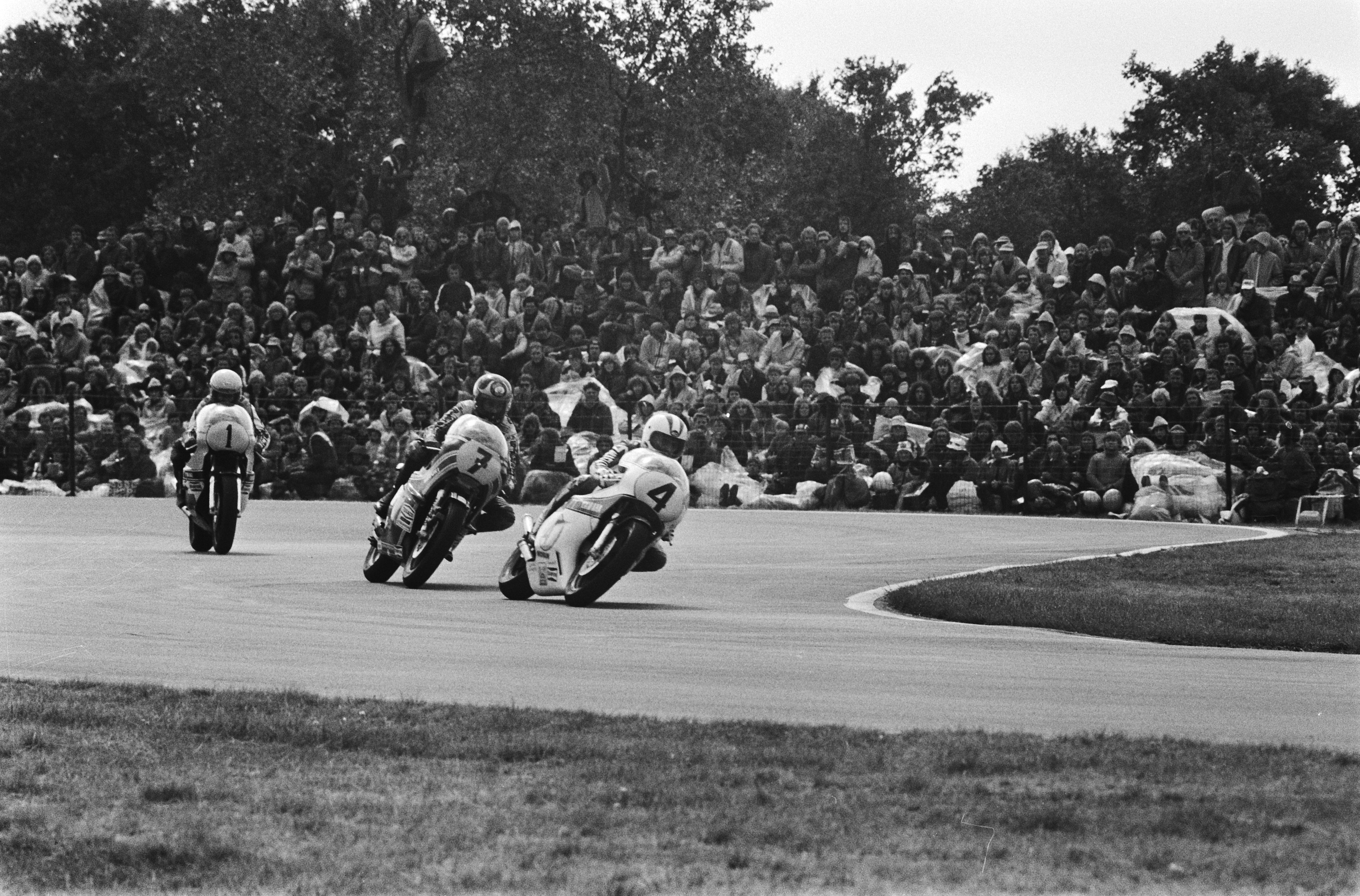
Johnny Cecotto (4) leads Barry Sheene (7) and Kenny Roberts (1) on his way to winning the 1978 500cc Dutch TT. It would be the final 500 class victory of his motorcycle racing career.

At the beginning of the 1977 season, Cecotto was badly injured in a deadly four rider accident at the Austrian Grand Prix that claimed the life of Swiss rider Hans Stadelmann. He recovered from his injuries in time for the Swedish Grand Prix where he finished in second place, 2.9 seconds behind winner Barry Sheene. Cecotto then won two consecutive races with victories at the Finnish Grand Prix and the Czechoslovak Grand Prix where he also won the 350cc Grand Prix. Despite missing most of the season due to injuries, he still ranked fourth in the final championship standings.

Cecotto began the 1978 season by winning the Imola 200 for a second time but, he faced a new rival for the world championship with the arrival of Kenny Roberts. Although he scored four podium finishes including a narrow victory by 1/10ths of a second over Roberts at the 1978 Dutch TT, he failed to score consistent results and suffered four mechanical failures, as Roberts won the world championship ahead of Sheene and the third placed Cecotto. He was more successful in the 1978 Formula 750 world championship, where despite four victories by Roberts, Cecotto was able to score three victories along with three second-place finishes to secure the championship.

Cecotto suffered a badly broken kneecap at the 1979 Austrian Grand Prix at the Salzburgring and missed half the season due to his injuries. He rejoined the championship for the final four races but, with his injuries still causing him pain, he failed to score consistent results, as Roberts won his second consecutive 500cc world championship. Although he won five races in the 1979 Formula 750 world championship, his inconsistent results relegated him to third place in the final standings.

As a result of Roberts' success for the Yamaha team along with Cecotto's inconsistent performances, Yamaha withdrew their factory support for Cecotto after the 1979 season. He went into the 1980 season competing as a privateer aboard a Bimota chassis powered by a Yamaha engine in the 350cc class and a production Yamaha in the 500cc class. He began the year with a victory at the 1980 Imola 200, joining Kenny Roberts as three-time winners of the event. His world championship campaign started on a positive note when he scored a victory at the season opening 350cc French Grand Prix along with a fourth-place finish in the 500cc race. After his initial success his motorcycles suffered numerous mechanical failures, and he could do no better than a fourth-place finish in the 350cc championship along with a seventh place in the 500cc championship. After the 1980 season, he decided to quit motorcycle racing at the age of 24 to pursue an auto racing career. He retired with twelve 500cc pole positions in 28 starts, giving him one of the highest pole position per start ratios in motorcycle Grand Prix history.

== Automobile racing history ==
=== Formula racing ===
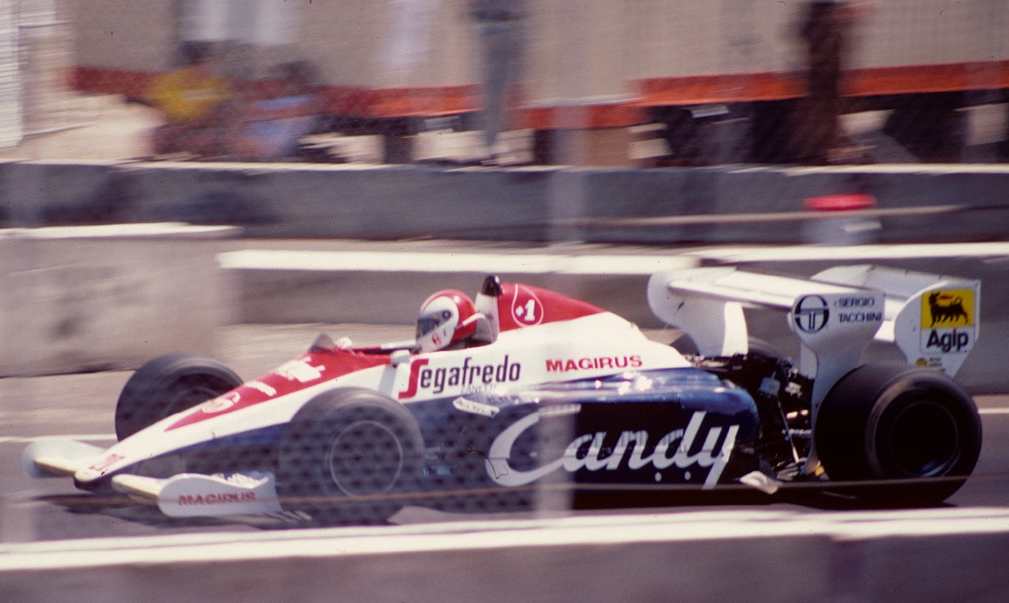
Cecotto at the 1984 Dallas Grand Prix, his last Formula One start

Cecotto made his four-wheeled debut with Minardi in the 1980 Formula Two Championship. In the 1982 Formula Two season, driving for the March-BMW team, he won three races and finished the season tied for first place with his teammate Corrado Fabi, but was relegated to runner up by the tie breaker system. Nevertheless, his performance garnered enough attention that he was offered a seat in Formula One.

In Formula One, Cecotto participated in 23 races, debuting on March 13, 1983 for the Theodore Racing team. He had a promising start as he scored a sixth place in only his second race; however, the team suffered from lack of funding and he was forced to sit out the final two rounds. For the 1984 season, he joined the Toleman racing team with Ayrton Senna as his teammate. While qualifying for the British Grand Prix, he crashed heavily at Westfield, breaking both of his legs, which effectively ended his Formula One career. His sixth place at Long Beach stood as the best result for a Venezuelan driver until Pastor Maldonado's victory in the Spanish Grand Prix 29 years later.

=== Touring cars ===
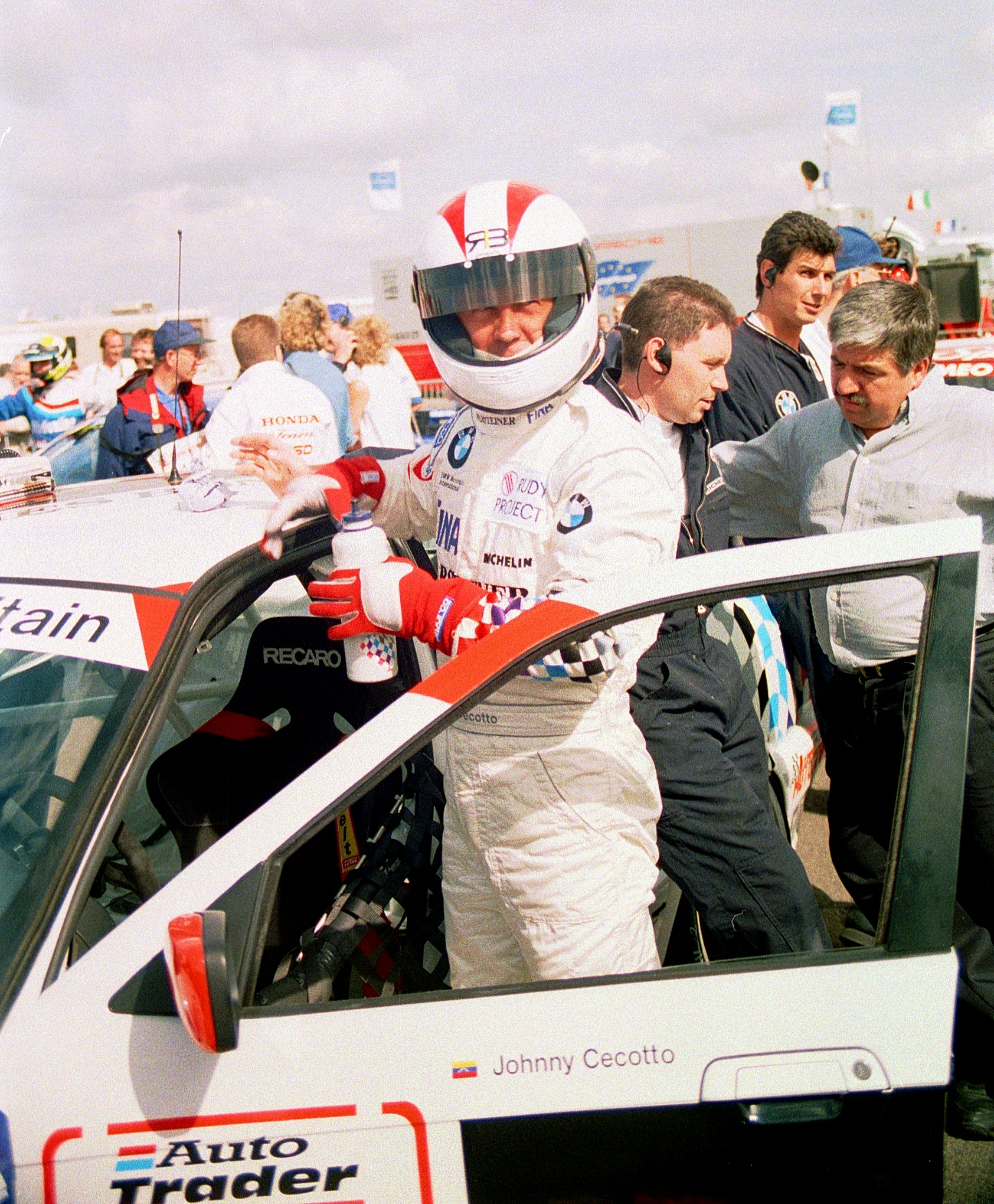
Cecotto at Silverstone during the 1995 British Touring Car Championship season

After recovering from his injuries, Cecotto returned to competition in the flourishing Group A Touring Car category for the famed Schnitzer Motorsport BMW team, with his best finish being second at the 1985 Spa 24 Hours with Dieter Quester and Markus Oestreich. He then traveled to Australia where he finished second in the 1985 James Hardie 1000 at the Mount Panorama Circuit in Bathurst, driving the BMW 635 CSi he drove at Spa, jointly winning the races "Rookie of the Year" award with his co-driver Roberto Ravaglia. During practice for the James Hardie, Cecotto professed surprise when told by former motorcycle racing rival Gregg Hansford, who was driving an Alfa Romeo GTV6 in the race, that they raced motorcycles at Mt Panorama as well as cars, claiming that he would think twice before racing a bike there (Hansford was at the time the 350cc motorcycle lap record holder for the 6.172 km (3.835 mi) circuit).

In 1986, Cecotto joined Belgian based factory backed RAS Sport Volvo team in the renamed (for 1986 only) FIA Touring Car Championship driving a turbocharged Volvo 240T. Usually co-driving with defending European Touring Car Champion Thomas Lindström, Cecotto finished eighth in the championship with two wins (Hockenheim and Zolder), two second and two third placings. He also drove a 240T to victory at the 1986 Guia Race held during the Macau Grand Prix, as well as winning the 1986 InterTEC 500 held at Fuji in Japan alongside Swedish driver and Volvo teammate Anders Olofsson.

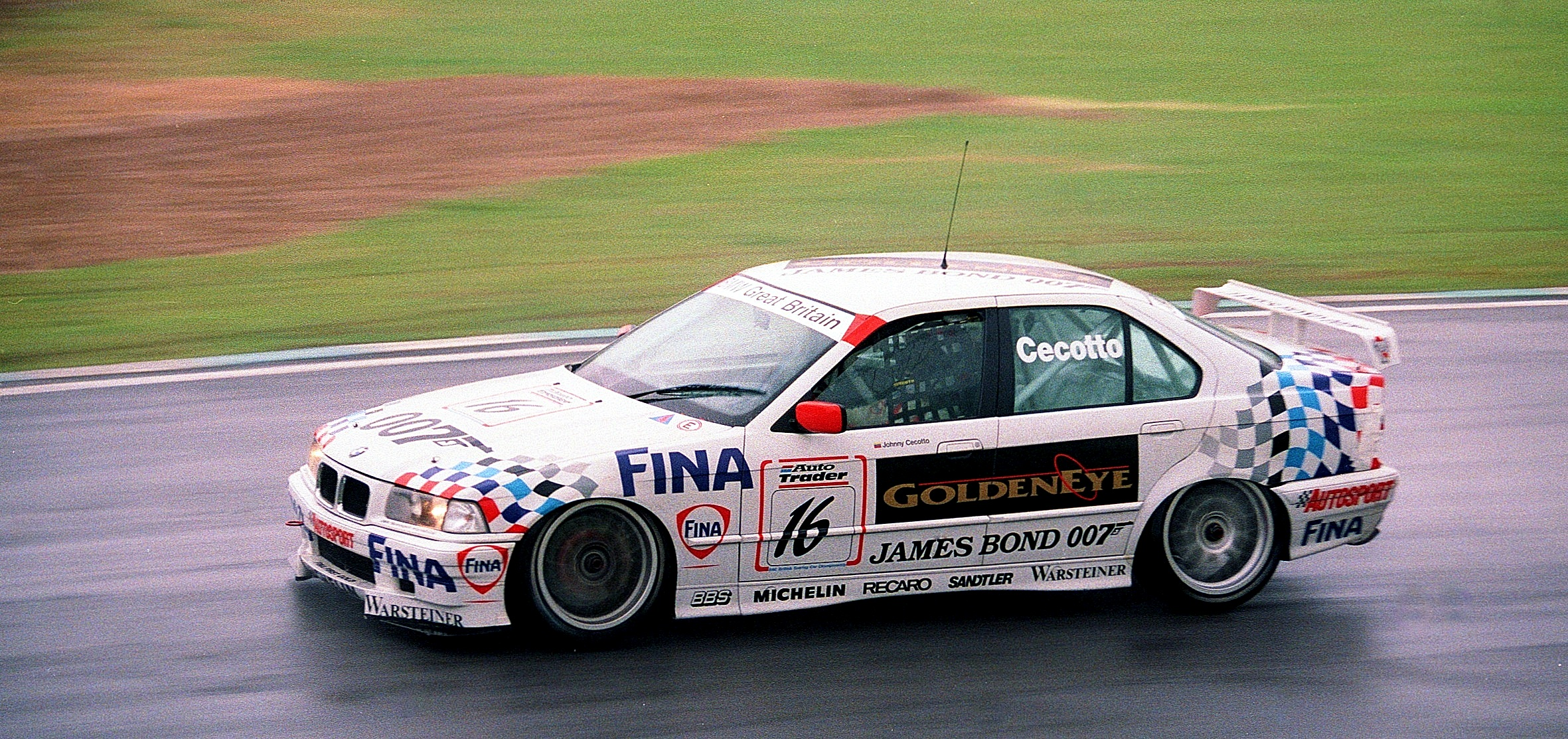
Cecotto driving for BMW at Brands Hatch during the 1995 British Touring Car Championship season

After Volvo pulled out at the end of the 1986 season, Cecotto re-joined BMW and competed in the 1987 World Touring Car Championship driving a BMW M3 for the Italian CiBiEmme team alongside joint 1985 ETCC champion Gianfranco Brancatelli. The pair won the third round of the championship, the 500 km de Bourgogne at Dijon-Prenois, before being the first WTCC registered car to finish the first Australian round, the 1987 James Hardie 1000. Although Cecotto and Brancatelli only finished in seventh place at Bathurst, as the first registered car to finish they were awarded first place points. In 1989, he captured the Italian Touring Car Championship. Cecotto finished in eighth place with Brancatelli in the 1987 World Touring Car Championship with 158 points.

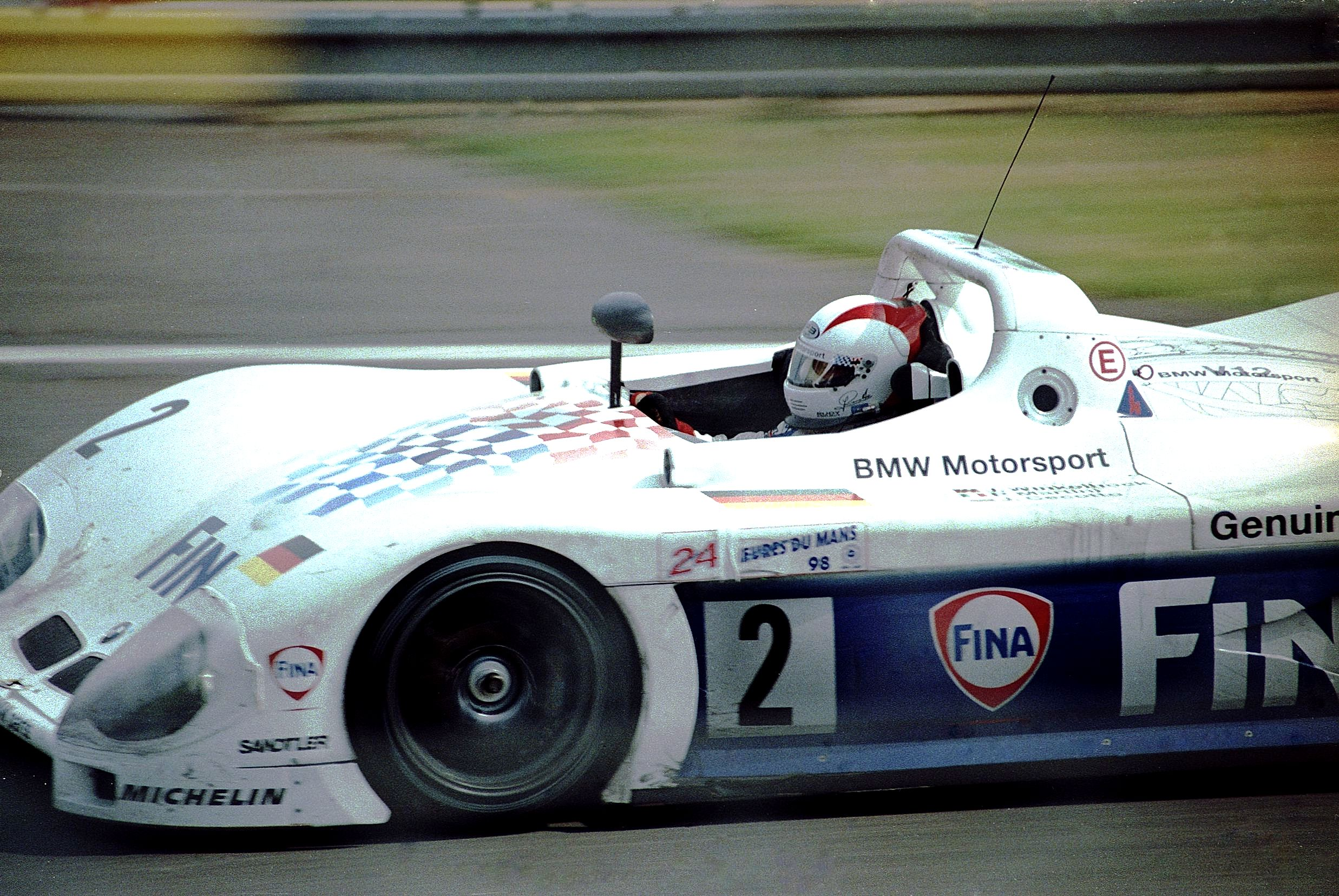
Cecotto competing at the 1998 24 Hours of Le Mans

From 1988 to 1992, Cecotto competed in the Deutsche Tourenwagen Meisterschaft (DTM, German Touring Car Championship). Driving a Schnitzer Motorsport BMW M3, he finished as runner up in the 1990 season. He also participated in endurance racing, winning the 1990 24 Hours of Spa, the 1992 24 Hours of Nürburgring, the 1996 2 Hours of Curitiba, the 2 Hours of Brasília and the 1997 Mil Milhas Brasil. In 1994 and 1998, he won the German Super Tourenwagen Cup Championship for BMW. In 1995, he raced in the British Touring Car Championship (BTCC) for BMW. In 2001 and 2002, he switched to the Irmscher Opel Omega and won the German V8Star Series Championship two years running.

== Later life ==
As of 2017, Cecotto devoted most of his time to supporting the professional auto racing career of his sons, Johnny Cecotto Jr. and Jonathan Cecotto.

== Racing record ==
=== Motorcycle Grand Prix results ===
**Position**	1	2	3	4	5	6	7	8	9	10
**Points**	15	12	10	8	6	5	4	3	2	1

(key) (Races in bold indicate pole position; races in italics indicate fastest lap)

Year	Class	Team	Machine	1	2	3	4	5	6	7	8	9	10	11	12	13	Points	Rank	Wins
1975	250cc	Venemotos-Yamaha	TZ250	FRA; 1	ESP; NC		GER; NC	NAT; 2	IOM	NED; NC	BEL; 1	SWE; NC	FIN; 2	CZE; NC	YUG		54	4th	2
1975	350cc	Venemotos-Yamaha	TZ350	FRA; 1	ESP; 2	AUT; NC	GER; 1	NAT; 1	IOM	NED; 5			FIN; 1	CZE; NC	YUG		78	1st	4
1976	350cc	Venemotos-Yamaha	TZ350	FRA; 2	AUT; 1	NAT; 1	YUG; NC	IOM	NED; 8			FIN; NC	CZE; NC	GER; 2	ESP; 4		65	2nd	2
1976	500cc	Venemotos-Yamaha	YZR500	FRA; 2	AUT; NC	NAT; NC		IOM	NED; DNS	BEL	SWE	FIN	CZE	GER			12	19th	0
1977	350cc	Venemotos-Yamaha	TZ350	VEN; 1	**AUT**; C	GER; INJ	NAT; INJ	ESP; INJ	FRA; INJ	YUG; INJ	NED; INJ		SWE; NC	FIN; NC	CZE; 1	GBR; NC	30	9th	2
1977	500cc	Venemotos-Yamaha	YZR500	**VEN**; 4	AUT; INJ	GER; INJ	NAT; INJ		FRA; INJ		NED; INJ	BEL; INJ	SWE; 2	FIN; 1	**CZE**; 1	GBR; NC	50	4th	2
1978	500cc	Venemotos-Yamaha	YZR500	**VEN**; NC	ESP; 4	**AUT**; 2	**FRA**; NC	NAT; NC	**NED**; 1	**BEL**; NC	**SWE**; 6	**FIN**; 3	GBR; 7	**GER**; 2			66	3rd	1
1979	500cc	Venemotos-Yamaha	YZR500	VEN; NC	**AUT**; NC	GER; INJ	NAT; INJ	ESP; INJ	YUG; INJ	NED; INJ	**BEL**; DNS	SWE; NC	FIN; 7	GBR; NC	FRA; 5		10	20th	0
1980	350cc	Venemotos-Yamaha	TZ350	NAT; 1		FRA; 2	NED; 20			GBR; NC	CZE; NC	GER; 3					37	4th	1
1980	500cc	Venemotos-Yamaha	YZR500	NAT; 4	ESP; 6	FRA; 9	NED; 6	BEL; NC	FIN	GBR; 5		GER; 6					31	7th	0

=== Complete European Formula Two Championship results ===
(key) (Races in bold indicate pole position; races in italics indicate fastest lap)

Year	Entrant	Chassis	Engine	1	2	3	4	5	6	7	8	9	10	11	12	13	Pos	Pts
1980	Mike Earle Racing with March	March 802	BMW	THR	HOC	NÜR	VLL	PAU	SIL; Ret	ZOL; 9	MUG						—	0
1980	Minardi Team	Minardi GM75	BMW									ZAN; 15	PER	MIS	HOC		—	0
1981	Minardi Team	Minardi Fly 281	BMW	SIL; 14	HOC; Ret	THR; 4	NÜR; DNS	VLL; Ret									14th	6
1981	Horag Hotz Racing	March 802	BMW						MUG; 13								14th	6
1981	Horag Hotz Racing	March 812	BMW							PAU; 7	PER; Ret	SPA; Ret	DON; 6	MIS; 6	MAN; 6		14th	6
1982	March Racing Ltd	March 822	BMW	SIL; Ret	HOC; 4	THR; 1	NÜR; 3	MUG; 2	VLL; Ret	PAU; 1	SPA; 2	HOC; 6	DON; 2	MAN; 1	PER; 3	MIS; 15	**2nd**	**56**

=== Complete Formula One World Championship results ===
(key) (Races in bold indicate pole position)

Year	Team	Chassis	Engine	1	2	3	4	5	6	7	8	9	10	11	12	13	14	15	16	WDC	Points
1983	Theodore Racing Team	Theodore N183	Ford Cosworth DFV 3.0 V8	BRA; 14	USW; 6	FRA; 11	SMR; Ret	MON; DNPQ	BEL; 10	DET; Ret	CAN; Ret	GBR; DNQ	GER; 11	AUT; DNQ	NED; DNQ	ITA; 12	EUR	RSA		19th	1
1984	Toleman Group Motorsport	Toleman TG183B	Hart 415T 1.5 L4T	BRA; Ret	RSA; Ret	BEL; Ret	SMR; NC													NC	0
1984	Toleman Group Motorsport	Toleman TG184	Hart 415T 1.5 L4T					FRA; Ret	MON; Ret	CAN; 9	DET; Ret	DAL; Ret	GBR; DNQ	GER	AUT	NED	ITA	EUR	POR	NC	0

=== Complete European Touring Car Championship results ===
(key) (Races in bold indicate pole position) (Races in italics indicate fastest lap)

Year	Team	Car	1	2	3	4	5	6	7	8	9	10	11	12	13	14	15	16	17	18	19	20	DC	Points
1985	Schnitzer Motorsport	BMW 635 CSi	MNZ	VAL	DON	AND	BRN	ZEL	SAL; 7	NUR	SPA; 2	SIL	NOG	ZOL	EST	JAR; 7							NA	NA
1986	RAS Sport	Volvo 240T	MNZ; 9	**DON**; Ret	HOC; 1	MIS; 2	AND; DSQ	BRN; 3	ZEL; DSQ	NUR; 10	SPA; 12	SIL; 15	NOG; 2	**ZOL**; 1	JAR; 3	EST; 16							8th	144
1987	CiBiEmme Sport	BMW M3	DON; Ret	EST; 1	AND	ZOL; Ret	ZEL; 1	**IMO**; Ret	NOG; Ret														15th	80
1988	CiBiEmme Sport	Alfa Romeo 75	MNZ	DON	EST	JAR	DIJ	VAL	NUR	SPA; Ret	ZOL	SIL	NOG										NC	0
2000	Team Isert	BMW 320i	MUG; 1	MUG; 2	PER; 1	PER; 2	A1R; 1	A1R; 2	MNZ; 1	MNZ; 2	HUN; 1	HUN; 2	IMO; 1	IMO; 2	MIS; 1	MIS; 2	BRN; 1	BRN; 2	VAL; 1; 6	VAL; 2; 5	MOB; 1	MOB; 2	13th	14

=== Complete World Touring Car Championship results ===
(key) (Races in bold indicate pole position) (Races in italics indicate fastest lap)

Year	Team	Car	1	2	3	4	5	6	7	8	9	10	11	DC	Points
1987	CiBiEmme Sport BMW Motorsport	BMW M3	MNZ; DSQ	JAR ovr:8 cls:6	DIJ ovr:1 cls:1	NUR; Ret	SPA; Ret	BNO ovr:5 cls:3	SIL; Ret	BAT ovr:7 cls:3	CLD ovr:4 cls:2	WEL; Ret	FJI ovr:6 cls:3	8th	158

† Despite finishing 7th outright at Bathurst, as the highest placed registered WTCC car Cecotto was awarded 1st place points for the round.

=== Complete Deutsche Tourenwagen Meisterschaft/Masters results ===
(key) (Races in bold indicate pole position; races in italics indicate fastest lap)

Year	Team	Car	1	2	3	4	5	6	7	8	9	10	11	12	13	14	15	16	17	18	19	20	21	22	23	24	DC	Points
1988	AMG-Mercedes	Mercedes 190E 2.3-16	ZOL; 8	ZOL; Ret	HOC; 13	HOC; Ret	NÜR; 13	NÜR; 12	BRN; 33	BRN	BER; 1	BER; 1	DIE; 15	DIE; Ret	NÜR; 11	NÜR; 9	NOR; 3	NOR; 4	WUN; 7	WUN; 6	SLZ; C	SLZ; C	HUN; 1	HUN; 1	HOC; 3	HOC; Ret	6th	204
1989	BMW M Team Schnitzer	BMW M3 Evo	ZOL	ZOL	HOC; 3	HOC; 1	NÜR	NÜR	MAI; 2	MAI; 8	BER; 5	BER; 22	NÜR; 2	NÜR; 2	NOR; 7	NOR; 6	HOC; 1	HOC; 4	DIE; Ret	DIE	NÜR	NÜR	HOC; 3	HOC; 4			7th	206
1990	BMW M Team Schnitzer	BMW M3 Sport Evo	ZOL; 5	ZOL; Ret	HOC; 4	HOC; 1	NÜR; Ret	NÜR; 4	BER; 12	BER; 5	MAI; 1	MAI; 1	WUN; 3	WUN; 4	NÜR; Ret	NÜR; 3	NOR; 5	NOR; 14	DIE; 2	DIE; 3	NÜR; 9	NÜR; Ret	HOC; 11	HOC; 4			**2nd**	**177**
1991	BMW M Team Schnitzer	BMW M3 Sport Evo	ZOL; 1	ZOL; 1	HOC; 9	HOC; DSQ	NÜR; 2	NÜR; Ret	BER; 6	BER; 5	WUN; 6	WUN; 1	NOR; 14	NOR; 6	DIE; 12	DIE; 2	NÜR; 10	NÜR; 4	SIN; 5	SIN; Ret	HOC; 4	HOC; 13	BRN; 5	BRN; 5	DON; 3	DON; 3	4th	147
1992	FINA Motorsport Team	BMW M3 Sport Evo	ZOL; 12	ZOL; Ret	NÜR; 6	NÜR; Ret	WUN; 5	WUN; Ret	BER; 2	BER; 6	HOC; 9	HOC; 8	NÜR; 2	NÜR; 2	NOR; 7	NOR; 7	BRN; 1	BRN; 1	DIE; 5	DIE; 5	SIN; 4	SIN; 12	NÜR; 3	NÜR; 4	HOC; 7	HOC; 2	4th	185
2002	OPC Euroteam	Opel Astra V8 Coupé	HOC; QR	HOC; CR	ZOL; QR	ZOL; CR	DON; QR	DON; CR	SAC; QR	SAC; CR	NOR; QR	NOR; CR	LAU; QR	LAU; CR	NÜR; QR	NÜR; CR	A1R; QR	A1R; CR	ZAN; QR	ZAN; CR	HOC; QR; 14	HOC; CR; 10					NC	0

=== Complete German GT Cup results ===
(key) (Races in bold indicate pole position; races in italics indicate fastest lap)

Year	Team	Car	1	2	3	4	5	6	7	8	Pos	Pts
1993	BMW Team FINA Warsteiner	BMW M3 GTR	BER; 1	ZOL; 4	NÜR; 1	NÜR; DNF	SLZ; 1	AHL; 1	NÜR; 1	ZAN; 1	1st	130

=== Complete Super Tourenwagen Cup results ===
(key) (Races in bold indicate pole position; races in italics indicate fastest lap)

Year	Team	Car	1	2	3	4	5	6	7	8	9	10	11	12	13	14	15	16	17	18	19	20	Pos	Pts
1994	BMW Motorsport Team	BMW 318is	BER; 8	WUN; Ret	ZOL; 1	ZAN; 3	ÖST; 3	SLZ; 1	**SPA**; 1	**NÜR**; 1													**1st**	**107**
1996	BMW Team Bigazzi	BMW 320i	ZOL; 1	ZOL; 2	ASS; 1	ASS; 2	HOC; 1	HOC; 2	SAC; 1	SAC; 2	WUN; 1	WUN; 2	ZWE; 1	ZWE; 2	SAL; 1; 6	SAL; 2; 7	AVU; 1; 11	AVU; 2; 2	NÜR; 1; 6	NÜR; 2 Ret			20th	116
1997	BMW Team Bigazzi	BMW 320i	HOC; 1; 2	HOC; 2; 3	ZOL; 1; 1	ZOL; 2; 1	NÜR; 1; 3	NÜR; 2; 2	SAC; 1; 15	SAC; 2; 5	NOR; 1; 4	NOR; 2 Ret	WUN; 1; 7	WUN; 2; 5	ZWE; 1; 3	ZWE; 2; 2	SAL; 1; 7	SAL; 2; 5	REG; 1; 1	REG; 2; 2	NÜR; 1; 5	NÜR; 2; 3	**3rd**	**571**
1998	BMW Team Schnitzer	BMW 320i	HOC; 1; 8	HOC; 2; 8	NÜR; 1; 3	NÜR; 2; 1	**SAC**; **1**; 1	**SAC**; **2**; 1	NOR; 1; 8	NOR; 2; 4	REG; 1; 4	REG; 2; 2	WUN; 1; 9	WUN; 2; 10	ZWE; 1; 1	**ZWE**; **2**; 1	SAL; 1; 12	SAL; 2; 10	OSC; 1; 3	OSC; 2; 2	NÜR; 1; 4	NÜR; 2; 4	**1st**	**595**

=== Complete British Touring Car Championship results ===
(key) (Races in bold indicate pole position) (Races in italics indicate fastest lap)

Year	Team	Car	1	2	3	4	5	6	7	8	9	10	11	12	13	14	15	16	17	18	19	20	21	22	23	24	25	Pos	Pts
1995	BMW Motorsport Team	BMW 318i	DON; 1; 5	DON; 2; 8	BRH; 1; 11	BRH; 2; 5	THR; 1 Ret	THR; 2; 11	SIL; 1; 11	SIL; 2; 12	OUL; 1; 9	OUL; 2 Ret	BRH; 1; 10	BRH; 2; 9	DON; 1 Ret	DON; 2 Ret	SIL; DNS	KNO; 1; 4	KNO; 2 Ret	BRH; 1; 5	BRH; 2 Ret	SNE; 1; 10	SNE; 2 Ret	OUL; 1 Ret	OUL; 2; 6	SIL; 1 Ret	SIL; 2 Ret	12th	49

=== Complete Italian Superturismo Championship results ===
Year	Team	Car	1	2	3	4	5	6	7	8	9	10	11	12	13	14	15	16	17	18	19	20	DC	Pts
1993	Scuderia Bigazzi	BMW 318i	MNZ; 1; 2	MNZ; 2; 1	VAL; 1; 2	VAL; 2; 2	MIS; 1 Ret	MIS; 2; 3	MAG; 1; 5	MAG; 2; 14	BIN; 1; 13	BIN; 2; 5	IMO; 1; 3	IMO; 2; 1	VAR; 1; 4	VAR; 2; 9	MIS; 1; 3	MIS; 2; 4	PER; 1	PER; 2	MUG; 1	MUG; 2	5th	164
1994	Scuderia Bigazzi	BMW 318is	MNZ; 1	MNZ; 2	VAL; 1	VAL; 2	MAG; 1; 9	MAG; 2; 4	BIN; 1; 16	BIN; 2; 5	MIS; 1; 2	MIS; 2; 3	VAL; 1; 5	VAL; 2; 4	MUG; 1; 5	MUG; 2; 4	PER; 1; 2	PER; 2 Ret	VAR; 1; 15	VAR; 2; 7	MUG; 1; 4	MUG; 2 DNS	7th	112
1996	CiBiEmme Engineering	BMW 320i	MUG; 1; 2	MUG; 2; 3	MAG; 1; 4	MAG; 2 DNS	**MNZ**; **1**; 4	MNZ; 2; 3	BIN; 1; 3	BIN; 2; 2	**MIS**; **1**; 1	**MIS**; **2**; 1	IMO; 1; 2	IMO; 2; 5	PER; 1 Ret	PER; 2; 5	PER; 1; 2	PER; 2; 2	**VAR**; **1**; 1	**VAR**; **2**; 2	VAL; 1; 1	**VAL**; **2**; 1	2nd	244

=== 24 Hours of Le Mans results ===
Year	Team	Co-Drivers	Car	Class	Laps	Pos.	Class Pos.
1981	BMW Italie-France (Germany) Team BMW Motorsport	(France) Philippe Alliot (France) Bernard Darniche	BMW M1 Gr.5	Gr.5	277	16th	5th
1996	(Italy) Team Bigazzi (Germany) Team BMW Motorsport	(Brazil) Nelson Piquet (United States) Danny Sullivan	McLaren F1 GTR	GT1	324	8th	6th
1998	(Germany) Team BMW Motorsport	(Italy) Pierluigi Martini (Germany) Joachim Winkelhock	BMW V12 LM	LMP1	43	DNF	DNF

=== Complete Bathurst 1000 results ===
Year	Team	Co-Drivers	Car	Class	Laps	Pos.	Class Pos.
1985	(Australia) / (West Germany) Goold Motorsport	(Italy) Roberto Ravaglia	BMW 635 CSi	C	163	**2nd**	**2nd**
1987	(West Germany) BMW Motorsport (Italy) CiBiEmme	(Italy) Gianfranco Brancatelli	BMW M3	2	154	7th	**3rd**
1992	(Australia) Benson & Hedges Racing	(Australia) Tony Longhurst	BMW M3 Evolution	A	142	4th	4th

Sporting positions
Preceded by Giacomo Agostini	350cc Motorcycle World Champion; 1975	Succeeded by Walter Villa
Preceded by Gianfranco Brancatelli	Guia Race; Winner; 1986	Succeeded by Roberto Ravaglia
Preceded by Gianfranco Brancatelli	Italia Superturismo Championship; Champion; 1989	Succeeded by Roberto Ravaglia
Preceded by Inaugural	Super Tourenwagen Cup; Champion; 1994	Succeeded by Joachim Winkelhock
Preceded by Laurent Aïello	Super Tourenwagen Cup; Champion; 1998	Succeeded by Christian Abt
