= 1979 Belgian motorcycle Grand Prix =

(Belgium) 1979 Belgian Grand Prix
Race details
- Race 8 of 13 races in the 1979 Grand Prix motorcycle racing season
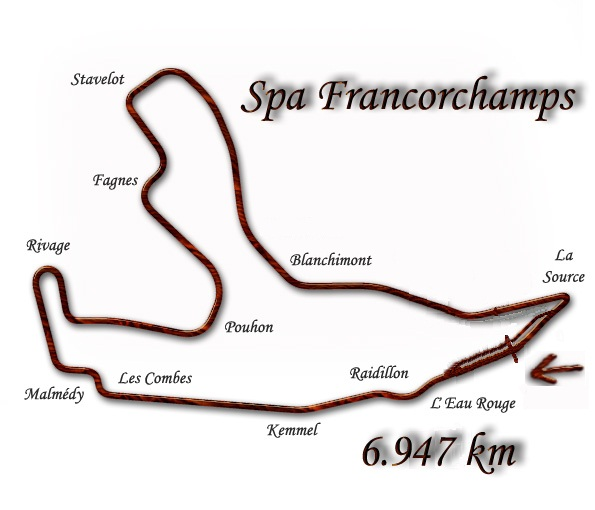
- Date: 1 July 1979
- Official name: G.P. Moto
- Location: Circuit de Spa-Francorchamps
- Course: Permanent racing facility; 6.947 km (4.317 mi)

500cc
Pole position
- Rider: (Venezuela) Johnny Cecotto
- Time: 2:50.900
Fastest lap
- Rider: (Australia) Kenny Blake
- Time: 2:49.250
Podium
- First: (New Zealand) Dennis Ireland
- Second: (Australia) Kenny Blake
- Third: (United Kingdom) Gary Lingham

350cc
Pole position
- Rider: No 350cc race was held
Fastest lap
- Rider: No 350cc race was held
Podium
- First: No 350cc race was held
- Second: No 350cc race was held
- Third: No 350cc race was held

250cc
Pole position
- Rider: (United Kingdom) Chas Mortimer
- Time: 2:58.300
Fastest lap
- Rider: (Austria) Edi Stöllinger
- Time: 2:50.080
Podium
- First: (Austria) Edi Stöllinger
- Second: (United Kingdom) Chas Mortimer
- Third: (Australia) Murray Sayle

125cc
Pole position
- Rider: (Spain) Ángel Nieto
- Time: 3:02.300
Fastest lap
- Rider: (France) Jean-François Lecureux
- Time: 3:01.280
Podium
- First: (Australia) Barry Smith
- Second: (Spain) Marcelino Garcia
- Third: (Netherlands) Martin van Soest

50cc
Pole position
- Rider: (Italy) Eugenio Lazzarini
- Time: 3:14.900
Fastest lap
- Rider: (Switzerland) Stefan Dörflinger
Podium
- First: (Netherlands) Henk van Kessel
- Second: (Netherlands) Theo Timmer
- Third: (West Germany) Rudolf Kunz

The 1979 Belgian motorcycle Grand Prix was the eighth round of the 1979 Grand Prix motorcycle racing season. It took place on the weekend of 29–1 July 1979 at the Circuit de Spa-Francorchamps.

== Controversy ==
This race was notorious because the circuit of Spa had gotten a new layer of asphalt after the circuit's original length was reduced from 14.1 to 7 Kilometers. Because it was only finished two days before the start of the first free practices, there were a lot problems. The FIM had approved the new venue five weeks before the start of the grand prix, but when Kenny Roberts made a promotional visit to the track four weeks before the start of the race, he noted that the road surface did not have a top layer of asphalt and that no guard rails were placed yet.

During the free practices and qualifying, many riders fell off their bikes as a result. It turned out that a tar truck had spilled so much tar that even one of the steamrollers had slipped off the track that week, and that too much oil was also processed into the asphalt. As a response, the Belgian Minister of Public Works Guy Mathot mobilised many people of the Belgian Civil defense to clean up the slippery surface with fire brigade, brush and sweeper trucks all through the night. This however, did not help and top riders such as Roberts, Sheene, Ferrari and Hartog negotiated with the organisation and the FIM whether they should or should not ride this grand prix. On Saturday evening, the drivers gave a press conference in which they announced that they had nothing against the organization or the FIM, but that the circuit was not safe enough because too much oil was processed in the asphalt.

Eventually, all Factory teams boycotted the event after the Saturday qualifying due to the dangerous track conditions, which promptly enraged the tens of thousands of fans who already bought a ticket to see the race on Sunday. Once they found out about the decision, unrest and riots broke out. Angry fans tipped over cars and set them on fire, as well as the hay bales (which were lined up on the circuit as safety barriers for the riders) all through the night. Various fans had to be transported to the local hospital after various fights with the Belgian police had broken out.

Jack Middelburg and Boet van Dulmen originally were going to start the race because they believed that a track is also slippery when it's wet and because they didn't want to disappoint the many fans who came to see the race live, but when Dutch supporters of Wil Hartog, due to a lack of solidarity, threatened that they would throw beer bottles on the track when they would pass by, they also boycotted the race. In the end, Dennis Ireland would go on to win his only Motorcycle Grand Prix due to all the top racers not starting the race.

== Aftermath ==
After the race, the FIM initially suspended Kenny Roberts and Virginio Ferrari as the largest "rioters" and the Belgian Motorcyclist Association suspended four drivers, but the FIM Committee for Safety, Sports Coordination and Competitions converted the suspension into a conditional suspension and a fine and the BMB followed that example. After the training sessions of the next Grand Prix in Sweden, the drivers issued a communiqué in which it was first reported that the fine would not be paid. In addition, a number of requirements were set for the 1980 season:

- Full travel and accommodation allowance for the races in the US, Canada, Venezuela, Sweden, Finland and Spain.
- Additional safety measures at the Nürburgring, the Karlskoga Motorstadion, the Imatra Circuit and Spa-Francorchamps.
- Under no circumstances a possible Grand Prix of Switzerland, even if it was organized in another country.
- An increase of the minimum starting fee by 200%.
- Adequate press accommodation on all circuits.
- At the end of each season an election of three riders representatives in the CCR (Commission for Road Racing).
- On every circuit a decent (habitable) riders' quarter.

A few weeks later, 40 professional drivers, led by Kenny Roberts, presented a new organization and a new racing series: the "World Series of Motorcycle Racing". From the 1980 season onward the riders would not participate in any race organized by the FIM but only start in eight races with two classes: Formula 1 (500 cc) and Formula 2 (250 cc). The prize money was determined by the drivers. The idea did not last long: within a few weeks, Yamaha announced that he would side the FIM and, if necessary, to let Freddie Spencer race as a substitute for Roberts, and Roberts himself began to get doubts after Giacomo Agostini talked to him. Hard words were spoken during a press conference by Barry Sheene, Kenny Roberts and manager Barry Coleman. Roberts would never drive in FIM-Grands Prix again and all drivers who had signed in Silverstone for the World Series would go to court if they would start in FIM races. Those drivers were in turn tied to factory contracts and could be forced by the brands to drive for the FIM. At the beginning of the 1980 season it was already clear that the World Series could only be found under the umbrella of the FIM passage, and of course the FIM did not give permission. In a meeting, Wil Hartog was considered a coward because he did not want to sign for the World Series, but in the end Kenny Roberts, who was the instigator of all the fuss, had to bow his head. In fact, he even started at the Nürburgring in 1980, one of the circuits that had been deemed unsafe by the riders.

Furthermore, the problems with the asphalt persisted and the outcry of the disastrous 1979 race, prompted the FIM to switch the venue and race at the Circuit Zolder for the 1980 season. This however, was not a success and the chosen venue for the 1981 season was once again the Spa circuit.

== Classification ==
=== 500 cc ===
Pos.	Rider	Team	Manufacturer	Time/Retired	Points
1	(New Zealand) Dennis Ireland	Derry's Racing	Suzuki	57'09.670	15
2	(Australia) Kenny Blake		Yamaha	+5.250	12
3	(United Kingdom) Gary Lingham		Suzuki	+11.080	10
4	(West Germany) Gustav Reiner	Dieter Braun Team	Suzuki	+38.930	8
5	(Netherlands) Henk de Vries	Team 77	Suzuki	+1'38.230	6
6	(West Germany) Josef Hage	Dieter Braun Team	Suzuki	+1'38.400	5
7	(Belgium) Jacky Matagne		Suzuki	+2'46.860	4
8	(West Germany) Gerhard Vogt	Bill Smith Racing	Suzuki	+2 laps	3
9	(Belgium) Guy Cooremans		Suzuki	+3 laps	2
10	(West Germany) Dieter Heinen		Yamaha	+4 laps	1
Ret	(Belgium) Philippe Chaltin		Suzuki	Retired	
Ret	(France) Etienne Geeraerd		Yamaha	Retired	
Ret	(United Kingdom) Steve Manship	Robinson Motorcycle Racing	Suzuki	Retired	
Ret	(United Kingdom) John Newbold	Team Appleby Glade	Suzuki	Retired	
Ret	(West Germany) Klaus Nies		Yamaha	Retired	
Ret	(Italy) Carlo Perugini		Yamaha	Retired	
Ret	(Finland) Timo Pohjola		Suzuki	Retired	
Ret	(West Germany) Elmar Renner	Moto Team Krawehl	Suzuki	Retired	
Ret	(Sweden) Peter Sjöström	Ava MC Stockholm	Suzuki	Retired	
Ret	(Spain) Toni Garcia		Suzuki	Retired	
Ret	(Belgium) Roland Mullender		Yamaha	Retired	
Ret	(Spain) Carlos Delgado de San Antonio		Suzuki	Retired	
Ret	(Denmark) Børge Nielsen		Suzuki	Retired	
DNS	(France) Michel Rougerie		Suzuki	Did not start	
DNS	(France) Christian Sarron	Team Sonauto Gauloises	Yamaha	Did not start	
DNS	(Netherlands) Boet van Dulmen		Suzuki	Did not start	
DNS	(France) Olivier Chevallier		Yamaha	Did not start	
DNS	(Switzerland) Philippe Coulon		Yamaha	Did not start	
DNS	(United States) Kenny Roberts	Yamaha Motor Company	Yamaha	Did not start	
DNS	(France) Bernard Fau	Suzuki France	Suzuki	Did not start	
DNS	(United Kingdom) Alex George		Suzuki	Did not start	
DNS	(France) Franck Gross		Suzuki	Did not start	
DNS	(Venezuela) Johnny Cecotto	Yamaha Motor Company	Yamaha	Did not start	
DNS	(Netherlands) Jack Middelburg		Suzuki	Did not start	
DNS	(Italy) Sergio Pellandini		Suzuki	Did not start	
DNS	(Italy) Gianni Pelletier		Suzuki	Did not start	
DNS	(Netherlands) Wil Hartog	Riemersma Racing	Suzuki	Did not start	
DNS	(Italy) Gianni Rolando	Scuderia Naldoni	Suzuki	Did not start	
DNS	(Italy) Graziano Rossi	Morbidelli	Morbidelli	Did not start	
DNS	(Finland) Seppo Rossi	Kouv MK	Suzuki	Did not start	
DNS	(Austria) Max Wiener		Suzuki	Did not start	
DNS	(United Kingdom) Steve Parrish	Texaco Heron Team Suzuki	Suzuki	Did not start	
DNS	(United Kingdom) Barry Sheene	Texaco Heron Team Suzuki	Suzuki	Did not start	
DNS	(Italy) Virginio Ferrari	Team Gallina Nava Olio Fiat	Suzuki	Did not start	
DNS	(Italy) Gianni Rolando	Scuderia Naldoni	Suzuki	Did not start	
DNS	(Italy) Marco Lucchinelli		Suzuki	Did not start	
DNS	(Netherlands) Willem Zoet	Stimorol Racing	Yamaha	Did not start	
DNS	(United Kingdom) Tony Head		Yamaha	Did not start	
DNS	(Japan) Sadao Asami		Yamaha	Did not start	
DNS	(United States) Randy Mamola	Serge Zago	Suzuki	Did not start	
DNS	(Belgium) Olivier Liégeois		Yamaha	Did not start	
DNS	(Japan) Ikujiro Takai	Yamaha Motor Company	Yamaha	Did not start	
DNS	(Italy) Franco Uncini	Team Zago International	Suzuki	Did not start	

Previous race: 1979 Dutch TT	FIM Grand Prix World Championship; 1979 season	Next race: 1979 Swedish Grand Prix
Previous race: 1978 Belgian Grand Prix	Belgian Grand Prix	Next race: 1980 Belgian Grand Prix
