= 1979 Formula 750 season =

1979 Formula 750 World Championship

Seasons
- ← 1978 none →

The 1979 Formula 750 season was the seventh and last season of the FIM Formula 750 World Championship and the third season to have full world championship status. Patrick Pons was crowned champion and became the first Frenchman to win an F.I.M. world championship.

== Championship standings ==
Pos	Rider	Bike	MUG (Italy)		BRA (United Kingdom)		NOG (France)		PAU (Switzerland)		OST (Austria)		MOS (Canada)		LAG (United States)		ASS (Netherlands)		HOC (Germany)		GRO (Socialist Federal Republic of Yugoslavia)		Pts
Pos	Rider	Bike	1	2	1	2	1	2	1	2	1	2	1	2	1	2	1	2	1	2	1	2	Pts
1	(France) Patrick Pons	Yamaha	5	5			1	2		3	3	2	1	2	5				1	1	3	3	154
2	(Switzerland) Michel Frutschi	Yamaha		4	5	5			1	4	6	9	5	1	6	3	3	4		10	1	2	132
3	(Venezuela) Johnny Cecotto	Yamaha	3	2	1	1			2	1							6	1			2	1	126
4	(Japan) Sadao Asami	Yamaha		3		3			3	2		10					7	7	3		5	5	73
5	(Italy) Gianfranco Bonera	Yamaha	6	7	8		3			6	7	7					2	5	7		6	4	70
6	(France) Marc Fontan	Yamaha	9	10			10	5					6	4	10	7			5	2	4	9	56
7	(France) Christian Sarron	Yamaha	1	8	3														2	3		6	55
8	(France) Raymond Roche	Yamaha	7	6	10		8	9		5	10		4		8	6	5	8		5		10	54
9	(Monaco) Hubert Rigal	Yamaha			9	8		8			4	4					10	10	4	4	7	8	49
10	(Finland) Markku Matikainen	Yamaha			2				4		9						9	9	8	6	9	7	40
11	(Australia) Gregg Hansford	Kawasaki	4		4	4		1															39
12	(Austria) Werner Nenning	Yamaha									1	1	7								8		37
13	(Switzerland) Jacques Cornu	Yamaha	10				7	4	5	8	2												34
14	(Netherlands) Boet van Dulmen	Yamaha				7											1	2					31
15	(United States) Kenny Roberts	Yamaha													1	1							30
16	(Italy) Virginio Ferrari	Suzuki	2	1																			27
17	(France) Christian Estrosi	Yamaha					2	3															22
=	(Canada) Steve Gervais	Yamaha											2	3									22
19	(United States) Richard Schlachter	Yamaha													2	4							20
20	(United States) Dave Aldana	Yamaha													3	5							16
21	(Australia) Greg Johnson	Yamaha							7	9		3											16
22	(France) Hervé Guilleux	Yamaha					4					6	10										14
23	(United States) Mike Baldwin	Yamaha				2																	12
=	(United States) Gene Romero	Yamaha														2							12
25	(France) Jean-François Baldé	Yamaha					5	6															11
26	(United States) Frank McTaggard	Yamaha											3										10
=	(Netherlands) Wil Hartog	Suzuki																3					10
28	(France) Alain Terras	Yamaha							6	7													9
=	(France) Jean-Louis Tournadre	Yamaha																	6	7			9
30	(United States) Randy Mamola	Yamaha													4								8
=	(France) Christian Huguet	Yamaha															4						8
32	(Austria) Fritz Kerschbaumer	Yamaha					9					5											8
=	(Canada) Dan Sorensen	Yamaha											9	5									8
34	(Canada) Gary Collins	Yamaha											8	6									8
=	(United Kingdom) John Newbold	Yamaha															8	6					8
36	(United States) Dale Singleton	Yamaha													7	8							7
37	(Austria) Richard Schulze	Suzuki									5												6
38	(United Kingdom) Keith Huewen	Yamaha			6	10																	6
39	(France) Dominique Pernet	Yamaha				9		7															6
40	(United Kingdom) Dave Potter	Yamaha				6																	5
=	(Switzerland) Philippe Coulon	Yamaha					6																5
42	(United Kingdom) Chris Guy	Yamaha			7																		4
=	(Canada) Arthur McKenna	Yamaha												7									4
44	(France) Jacques Agopian	Yamaha						10			8												4
45	(United States) Ron Pierce	Yamaha												9		9							4
46	(Italy) Gianpaolo Marchetti	Yamaha	8																				3
=	(Switzerland) Ernest Staub	Yamaha							8														3
=	(France) Gilles Husson	Yamaha										8											3
=	(Canada) G. Meiklejohn	Yamaha												8									3
=	(Australia) Murray Sayle	Yamaha																		8			3
51	(United States) Kevin Stafford	Yamaha													9	10							3
52	(Italy) Leandro Becheroni	Yamaha		9																			2
=	(France) Michel Rastel	Yamaha							9														2
=	(Northern Ireland) Joey Dunlop	Yamaha																	9				2
=	(Australia) Rick Walden	Yamaha																		9			2
56	(France) Pierre Soulas	Yamaha							10														1
=	(France) Franck Gross	Yamaha								10													1
=	(Canada) J. Mulligan	Yamaha												10									1
=	(France) Gérard Choukroun	Yamaha																	10				1
=	(France) Philippe Bouzanne	Yamaha																			10		1
Pos	Rider	Bike	1	2	1	2	1	2	1	2	1	2	1	2	1	2	1	2	1	2	1	2	Pts
Pos	Rider	Bike	MUG (Italy)		BRA (United Kingdom)		NOG (France)		PAU (Switzerland)		OST (Austria)		MOS (Canada)		LAG (United States)		ASS (Netherlands)		HOC (Germany)		GRO (Socialist Federal Republic of Yugoslavia)		Pts

Colour	Result
Gold	Winner
Silver	Second place
Bronze	Third place
Green	Points classification
Blue	Non-points classification
Blue	Non-classified finish (NC)
Purple	Retired, not classified (Ret)
Red	Did not qualify (DNQ)
Red	Did not pre-qualify (DNPQ)
Black	Disqualified (DSQ)
White	Did not start (DNS)
White	Withdrew (WD)
White	Race cancelled (C)
Blank	Did not practice (DNP)
Blank	Did not arrive (DNA)
Blank	Excluded (EX)

== See also ==
- 1979 Grand Prix motorcycle racing season
