= 1976 Belgian motorcycle Grand Prix =

(Belgium) 1976 Belgian Grand Prix
Race details
- Race 7 of 12 races in the 1976 Grand Prix motorcycle racing season
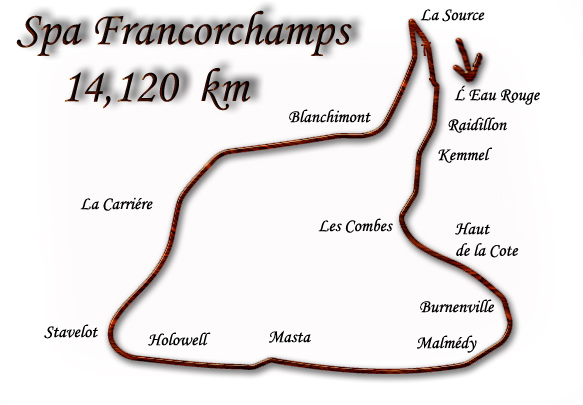
- Date: 4 July 1976
- Official name: Grand Prix Belgique/Grote Prijs Belgie
- Location: Circuit de Spa-Francorchamps
- Course: Permanent racing facility; 14.10 km (8.76 mi)

500cc
Pole position
Rider	(United Kingdom) Barry Sheene	Suzuki
Time	3:52.700	
Fastest lap
Rider	(United Kingdom) John Williams	Suzuki
Time	3:52.600	
Podium
First	(United Kingdom) John Williams	Suzuki
Second	(United Kingdom) Barry Sheene	Suzuki
Third	(Netherlands) Marcel Ankoné	Suzuki

250cc
Pole position
Rider	(Italy) Walter Villa	Harley-Davidson
Time	4:05.400	
Fastest lap
Rider	(Italy) Walter Villa	Harley-Davidson
Time	4:06.900	
Podium
First	(Italy) Walter Villa	Harley-Davidson
Second	(Italy) Paolo Pileri	Morbidelli
Third	(Japan) Takazumi Katayama	Yamaha

125cc
Pole position
Rider	(Spain) Ángel Nieto	Bultaco
Time	4:25.700	
Fastest lap
Rider	(Italy) Pierpaolo Bianchi	Morbidelli
Time	4:22.700	
Podium
First	(Spain) Ángel Nieto	Bultaco
Second	(Italy) Paolo Pileri	Morbidelli
Third	(Netherlands) Gert Bender	Bender

50cc
Pole position
Rider	(Spain) Ángel Nieto	Bultaco
Time	5:07.400	
Fastest lap
Rider	(West Germany) Herbert Rittberger	Kreidler
Time	5:08.300	
Podium
First	(West Germany) Herbert Rittberger	Kreidler
Second	(Spain) Ángel Nieto	Bultaco
Third	(Switzerland) Ulrich Graf	Kreidler

Sidecar (B2A)
Pole position
Rider	(West Germany) Siegfried Schauzu	Aro
Passenger	(West Germany) Wolfgang Kalauch	
Time	4:11.900	
Fastest lap
Rider	(West Germany) Helmut Schilling	Aro
Passenger	(West Germany) Rainer Gundel	
Time	4:22.900	
Podium
First rider	(West Germany) Rolf Steinhausen	Busch König
First passenger	(West Germany) Sepp Huber	
Second rider	(West Germany) Werner Schwärzel	König
Second passenger	(West Germany) Andreas Huber	
Third rider	(West Germany) Helmut Schilling	Aro
Third passenger	(West Germany) Rainer Gundel	

The 1976 Belgian motorcycle Grand Prix was the seventh round of the 1976 Grand Prix motorcycle racing season. It took place on 4 July 1976 at the Circuit de Spa-Francorchamps.

== 500cc classification ==
Pos.	No.	Rider	Team	Manufacturer	Time/Retired	Points
1	5	(United Kingdom) John Williams	Texaco Heron Team Suzuki	Suzuki	39'22.800	15
2	7	(United Kingdom) Barry Sheene	Texaco Heron Team Suzuki	Suzuki	+7.400	12
3	28	(Netherlands) Marcel Ankoné	Nimag Suzuki	Suzuki	+17.000	10
4	20	(France) Michel Rougerie		Suzuki	+28.600	8
5	4	(Finland) Teuvo Länsivuori	Life Racing Team	Suzuki	+38.600	6
6	14	(West Germany) Dieter Braun		Suzuki	+41.100	5
7	11	(United Kingdom) Chas Mortimer		Suzuki	+56.500	4
8	40	(United States) Pat Hennen	Colemans	Suzuki	+57.700	3
9	8	(United Kingdom) John Newbold	Texaco Heron Team Suzuki	Suzuki	+59.900	2
10	44	(West Germany) Helmut Kassner		Suzuki	+1'03.900	1
11	6	(United Kingdom) Alex George	Hermetite Racing International	Yamaha		
12	19	(United Kingdom) Tom Herron		Suzuki		
13	27	(Netherlands) Boet van Dulmen	Laponder Racing	Suzuki		
14	36	(Belgium) Jean-Pierre Orban		Yamaha		
15	29	(Belgium) Philippe Chaltin		Yamaha		
16	15	(Netherlands) Kees van der Kruys		Yamaha		
17	3	(Belgium) Etienne Geeraerd		Yamaha		
Ret	11	(Italy) Giacomo Agostini	Team API Marlboro	Suzuki	Retired	
Ret	6	(Australia) Jack Findlay	Jack Findlay Racing	Suzuki	Retired	
Ret	12	(Austria) Karl Auer	Racing Team NO	Yamaha	Retired	
4	17	(Japan) Takazumi Katayama	Takazumi Katayama Sarome Team	Suzuki	Retired	
Ret	??	(Italy) Nico Cereghini	Life Racing Team	Suzuki	Retired	
WD	2	(United Kingdom) Phil Read	Team Life International	Suzuki	Withdrawn	
Ret	??	(Switzerland) Bruno Kneubühler		Yamaha	Retired	
Ret	33	(Spain) Víctor Palomo	Swaep Motor Racing	Yamaha	Retired	
Ret	18	(France) Olivier Chevallier		Yamaha	Retired	
Ret	36	(Belgium) Alain Nies		Suzuki	Retired	
Ret	??	(Switzerland) Philippe Coulon		Suzuki	Retired	
Ret	13	(France) Bernard Fau		Yamaha	Retired	
DNS	??	(France) Patrick Pons	Team Sonauto Gauloises	Yamaha	Did not start	
DNS	47	(New Zealand) Stuart Avant	Colemans	Suzuki	Did not start	

== 250 cc classification ==
Pos	No.	Rider	Manufacturer	Laps	Time	Grid	Points
1	8	(Italy) Walter Villa	Harley-Davidson	11	45:51.9	1	15
2	20	(Italy) Paolo Pileri	Morbidelli	11	+48.6	5	12
3	7	(Japan) Takazumi Katayama	Yamaha	11	+57.3	3	10
4	37	(Australia) John Dodds	Yamaha	11	+57.5	8	8
5	6	(Italy) Gianfranco Bonera	Harley-Davidson	11	+57.9	7	6
6	17	(Spain) Víctor Palomo	Yamaha	11	+58.3	6	5
7	5	(Germany) Dieter Braun	Yamaha	11	+58.9		4
8	35	(Finland) Pentti Korhonen	Yamaha	11	+1:08.4	9	3
9	24	(France) Patrick Fernandez	Yamaha	11	+1:21.0	14	2
10	9	(United Kingdom) Tom Herron	Yamaha	11	+1:21.2		1
11	47	(Australia) Victor Soussan	Yamaha				
12	33	(Netherlands) Henk van Kessel	Yamaha			11	
13	45	(France) Philippe Bouzanne	Yamaha				
14	27	(Netherlands) Boet van Dulmen	Yamaha			12	
15	22	(Czechoslovakia) M. Arias	Yamaha				
16	16	(France) Jean-François Baldé	Yamaha				
17	32	(Japan) Ken Nemoto	Yamaha				
18	34	(Italy) Franco Uncini	Yamaha				
19	39	(Belgium) R. Hubin	Yamaha			10	
Ret		(Switzerland) Bruno Kneubühler	Yamaha			2	
Ret		(Sweden) Leif Gustafsson	Yamaha			4	
Ret		(Finland) Pekka Nurmi	Yamaha			13	
Ret		(Soviet Union) Mati Reinup	MZ			15	

== 125 cc classification ==
Pos	No.	Rider	Manufacturer	Laps	Time	Grid	Points
1	26	(Spain) Ángel Nieto	Bultaco	10	44:47.1	1	15
2	3	(Italy) Paolo Pileri	Morbidelli	10	+4.8	3	12
3	6	(Italy) Eugenio Lazzarini	Morbidelli	10	+56.7	8	10
4	28	(Germany) Gert Bender	Bender	10	+1:07.0	5	8
5	2	(Austria) Harald Bartol	Morbidelli	10	+1:17.9	7	6
6	24	(France) Patrick Plisson	Morbidelli	10	+2:35.6	4	5
7	7	(Switzerland) Stefan Dörflinger	Morbidelli	10	+2:36.5	13	4
8	33	(Belgium) Julien van Zeebroeck	Morbidelli	10	+2:46.1	12	3
9	1	(Sweden) Leif Gustafsson	Yamaha	10	+3:15.1		2
10	16	(Netherlands) Cees van Dongen	Morbidelli	10	+3:33.2	14	1
11	29	(Germany) Horst Seel	Seel EB			15	
12	15	(Switzerland) Hans Müller	Yamaha				
13	42	(Germany) Anton Mang	Morbidelli			6	
14	36	(Netherlands) Piet van Niel	Yamaha				
Ret		(Italy) Pierpaolo Bianchi	Morbidelli			2	
Ret		(Netherlands) Henk van Kessel	AGV Condor			9	
Ret		(Italy) Claudio Lusuardi	Malamaz			10	
Ret		(France) Jean-Louis Guignabodet	Morbidelli			11	

== 50 cc classification ==
Pos	No.	Rider	Manufacturer	Laps	Time	Grid	Points
1	14	(Germany) Herbert Rittberger	Kreidler	6	31:20.7	2	15
2	10	(Spain) Ángel Nieto	Bultaco	6	+20.1	1	12
3	7	(Switzerland) Ulrich Graf	Kreidler	6	+37.7	3	12
4	15	(Italy) Eugenio Lazzarini	UFO	6	+1:07.6	6	8
5	18	(France) Benjamin Laurent	ABF	6	+1:09.8		6
6	40	(Netherlands) Engelbert Kip	Kreidler			9	5
7	12	(Germany) Rudolf Kunz	Kreidler			7	4
8	16	(Netherlands) Cees van Dongen	Kreidler			11	3
9	3	(Austria) Hans Hummel	Kreidler			5	2
10	1	(Switzerland) Stefan Dörflinger	Kreidler			8	1
11	30	(Spain) Ramon Gali	Derbi				
12	37	(Belgium) R. Dumont	Kreidler				
13	19	(Germany) Ingo Emmerich	Kreidler				
14	29	(Switzerland) Rolf Blatter	Kreidler				
15	21	(Germany) W. Golembeck	Kreidler				
16	26	(Belgium) Guido de Lys	Kreidler				
17	27	(Netherlands) Jaap Bosman	Kreidler				
18	5	(Netherlands) Theo Timmer	Kreidler				
19	39	(Belgium) G. Muyters	Kreidler				
Ret		(France) Pierre Audry	ABF			4	
Ret		(Spain) Joaquin Gali	Derbi			10	
Ret		(Belgium) C. Dumont	Kreidler			12	

== Sidecar classification ==
Pos	No.	Rider	Passenger	Manufacturer	Laps	Time	Grid	Points
1	1	(Germany) Rolf Steinhausen	(Germany) Sepp Huber	Busch-König	9	39:56.5	2	15
2	2	(Germany) Werner Schwärzel	(Germany) Andreas Huber	König	9	+0.3	3	12
3	11	(Germany) Helmut Schilling	(Germany) Rainer Gundel	Aro	9	+2.7	4	10
4	28	(Germany) Siegfried Schauzu	(Germany) Wolfgang Kalauch	Aro	9	+38.9	1	8
5	22	(Switzerland) Rudi Kurth	(United Kingdom) Dane Rowe	Yamaha	9	+1:24.3		'6
6	12	(United Kingdom) George O'Dell	(United Kingdom) Kenny Arthur	Yamaha	9	+1:53.9		'5
7	10	(Germany) Otto Haller	(Germany) Erich Haselbeck	BMW	9	+1:58.8		4
8	21	(Germany) Ted Janssen	(Germany) Erich Schmitz	Yamaha	9	+2:17.7		3
9	5	(United Kingdom) Mac Hobson	(United Kingdom) John Inchcliff	Yamaha	9	+2:26.8		2
10	19	(France) Alain Michel	(France) Bernard Garcia	Yamaha	9	+2:44.9		1
11	16	(United Kingdom) Dick Greasley	(United Kingdom) Cliff Holland	Chell Yamaha	9			
12	30	(Switzerland) Bruno Holzer	(Switzerland) Charly Meierhans	Chell Yamaha	9			
13	15	(Germany) Heinz Luthringshauser	(Germany) Lorenzo Puzo	BMW	9			
14	17	(Germany) Heinz Thevissen	(Germany) Juppi Esch	HTS	9			
15	24	(Belgium) Mark Alexandre	(Belgium) Paul Gerard	König	9			
16	7	(Switzerland) Hermann Schmid	(Switzerland) Jean-Pierre Martial	Yamaha	8	+1 lap		
Ret		(Switzerland) Rolf Biland	(United Kingdom) Ken Williams	Yamaha			6	
Ret		(Germany) Walter Ohrmann	(Germany) Bernd Grube	Yamaha			7	
Ret		(Germany) Gustav Pape	(Germany) Franz Kallenberg	König			8	
Ret		(Netherlands) Martin Kooy	(Netherlands) Rob Vader	König			9	
Ret		(Italy) Amedeo Zini	(Italy) Andrea Fornaro	König			10	

Previous race: 1976 Dutch TT	FIM Grand Prix World Championship; 1976 season	Next race: 1976 Swedish Grand Prix
Previous race: 1975 Belgian Grand Prix	Belgian Grand Prix	Next race: 1977 Belgian Grand Prix
