= Dennis Ireland =

New Zealand motorcycle racer

- Nationality: New Zealand
Motorcycle racing career statistics
Grand Prix motorcycle racing
Active years	1978 – 1979, 1983
First race	1978 500cc Belgian Grand Prix
Last race	1983 500cc British Grand Prix
First win	1979 500cc Belgian Grand Prix
Last win	1979 500cc Belgian Grand Prix
Starts / Wins / Podiums / Poles / F. laps / Points; 9 / 1 / 1 / 0 / 0 / 17

Dennis Ireland (born 19 November 1954) is a former Grand Prix motorcycle road racer from New Zealand. He had his best season in 1979 when he won the 500cc Belgian Grand Prix and finished the year in 14th place in the 500cc world championship. In 1982, Ireland won the Isle of Man TT.
