= Jim Filice =

American motorcycle racer (born 1962)

- Born: November 18, 1962 (age 64); San Jose, California, US
Motorcycle racing career statistics
500cc World Championship
Active years	1995
Manufacturers	Harris Yamaha
Starts / Wins / Podiums / Poles / F. laps / Points; 3 / 0 / 0 / 0 / 0 / 0
250cc World Championship
Active years	1988–1989, 1991, 1993–1994
Manufacturers	Honda, Suzuki, Yamaha
Starts / Wins / Podiums / Poles / F. laps / Points; 9 / 1 / 2 / 0 / 0 / 42

Jim Filice (born November 18, 1962) is an American former professional motorcycle racer, inducted in the Motorcycle Hall of Fame in 2000.

== Career statistics ==
=== Grand Prix motorcycle racing ===
==== By season ====
Season	Class	Motorcycle	Race	Win	Podium	Pole	FLap	Pts	Plcd
1988	250cc	Honda	1	1	1	0	0	20	21st
1989	250cc	Honda	2	0	1	0	0	22	20th
1991	250cc	Honda	3	0	0	0	0	0	NC
1993	250cc	Suzuki	0	0	0	0	0	0	NC
1994	250cc	Yamaha	3	0	0	0	0	0	NC
1995	500cc	Harris Yamaha	3	0	0	0	0	0	NC
Total			**12**	**1**	**2**	**0**	**0**	**42**	

==== Races by year ====
(key) (Races in bold indicate pole position, races in italics indicate fastest lap)

Year	Class	Machine	1	2	3	4	5	6	7	8	9	10	11	12	13	14	15	Pos	Pts
1988	250cc	Honda	JPN	USA; 1	SPA	E92	NAT	GER	AUT	NED	BEL	YUG	FRA	GBR	SWE	CZE	BRA	21st	20
1989	250cc	Honda	JPN; 11	AUS	USA; 2	SPA	NAT	GER	AUT	YUG	NED	BEL	FRA	GBR	SWE	CZE	BRA	20th	22
1991	250cc	Honda	JPN; 31	AUS; Ret	USA; 16	SPA	ITA	GER	AUT	EUR	NED	FRA	GBR	RSM	CZE	VIT	MAL	NC	0
1993	250cc	Suzuki	AUS	MAL	JPN	SPA	AUT	GER	NED	EUR	SMR	GBR	CZE	ITA	USA; DNQ	FIM		NC	0
1994	250cc	Yamaha	AUS	MAL	JPN; Ret	SPA; Ret	AUT; Ret	GER	NED	ITA	FRA	GBR	CZE	USA	ARG	EUR		NC	0
1995	500cc	Harris Yamaha	AUS	MAL	JPN	SPA; Ret	GER	ITA; 23	NED; Ret	FRA	GBR	CZE	BRA	ARG	EUR			NC	0
