= Jochen Schmid =

German motorcycle racer

- Nationality: German
- Born: 16 August 1963 (age 63); Backnang, West Germany
Motorcycle racing career statistics
Grand Prix motorcycle racing
Active years	1986–1993
First race	1988 250cc Czechoslovak Grand Prix
Last race	1993 250cc FIM Grand Prix
Starts / Wins / Podiums / Poles / F. laps / Points; 95 / 0 / 0 / 0 / 0 / 338

Jochen Schmid (born 16 August 1963) is a German former Grand Prix motorcycle road racer. He finished the 1992 season seventh overall in the 250cc class, and eighth one year earlier. Schmid competed in the World Superbike Championship from 1994 to 1997 and in 1999, taking two podiums at Hockenheim in 1995.

== Motorcycle Grand Prix Results ==
Points system from 1969 to 1987:

**Position**	1	2	3	4	5	6	7	8	9	10
**Points**	15	12	10	8	6	5	4	3	2	1

Points system from 1988 to 1992:

**Position**	1	2	3	4	5	6	7	8	9	10	11	12	13	14	15
**Points**	20	17	15	13	11	10	9	8	7	6	5	4	3	2	1

Points system from 1993 onwards:

**Position**	1	2	3	4	5	6	7	8	9	10	11	12	13	14	15
**Points**	25	20	16	13	11	10	9	8	7	6	5	4	3	2	1

(key) (Races in bold indicate pole position; races in italics indicate fastest lap)

Year	Class	Machine	1	2	3	4	5	6	7	8	9	10	11	12	13	14	15	Points	Rank
1986	250cc	Honda NSR250	ESP	NAT	GER; 31	AUT; 21	YUG	NED; 19	BEL; Ret	FRA	GBR	SWE	RSM					0	NC
1987	250cc	Yamaha YZR250	JPN	ESP; 12	GER; 14	NAT; 21	AUT; 20	YUG; 24	NED; 18	FRA; Ret	GBR; 22	SWE; 25	TCH	RSM; 31	POR	BRA	ARG	0	NC
1988	250cc	Honda NSR250	JPN	USA	ESP	EXP; 23	NAT	GER; 24	AUT; 27	NED; 22	BEL; 20	YUG; 22	FRA; 24	GBR; 19	SWE; 27	TCH; 10	BRA; Ret	6	33rd
1989	250cc	Honda NSR250	JPN; 23	AUS; 16	USA; 13	ESP; 13	NAT; 19	GER; 10	AUT; 11	YUG; 7	NED	BEL	FRA; Ret	GBR; 14	SWE; 11	TCH; 21	BRA; 13	36	16th
1990	250cc	Honda NSR250	JPN; 11	USA; 8	ESP; 6	NAT; 5	GER; 5	AUT; 12	YUG; 10	NED; 6	BEL; 10	FRA; 17	GBR; 10	SWE; Ret	TCH; 10	HUN; 14	AUS; 9	92	8th
1991	250cc	Honda NSR250	JPN; 13	AUS; 8	USA; 10	ESP; 7	ITA; 8	GER; 8	AUT; 7	EUR; 8	NED; Ret	FRA; 8	GBR; 5	RSM; 10	TCH; 7	VDM; 6	MAL; 12	96	8th
1992	250cc	Yamaha YZR250	JPN; 12	AUS; 11	MAL; 5	ESP; 8	ITA; 11	EUR; 5	GER; 12	NED; 6	HUN; 8	FRA; 4	GBR; 5	BRA; 5	RSA; 7			58	7th
1993	250cc	Yamaha YZR250	AUS; 12	MAL; Ret	JPN; 14	ESP; 9	AUT; 14	GER; 13	NED; Ret	EUR; 12	RSM; 15	GBR; 7	CZE; 9	ITA; 10	USA; Ret	FIM; 11		50	14th
