= Eddie Laycock =

Irish motorcycle racer (born 1961)

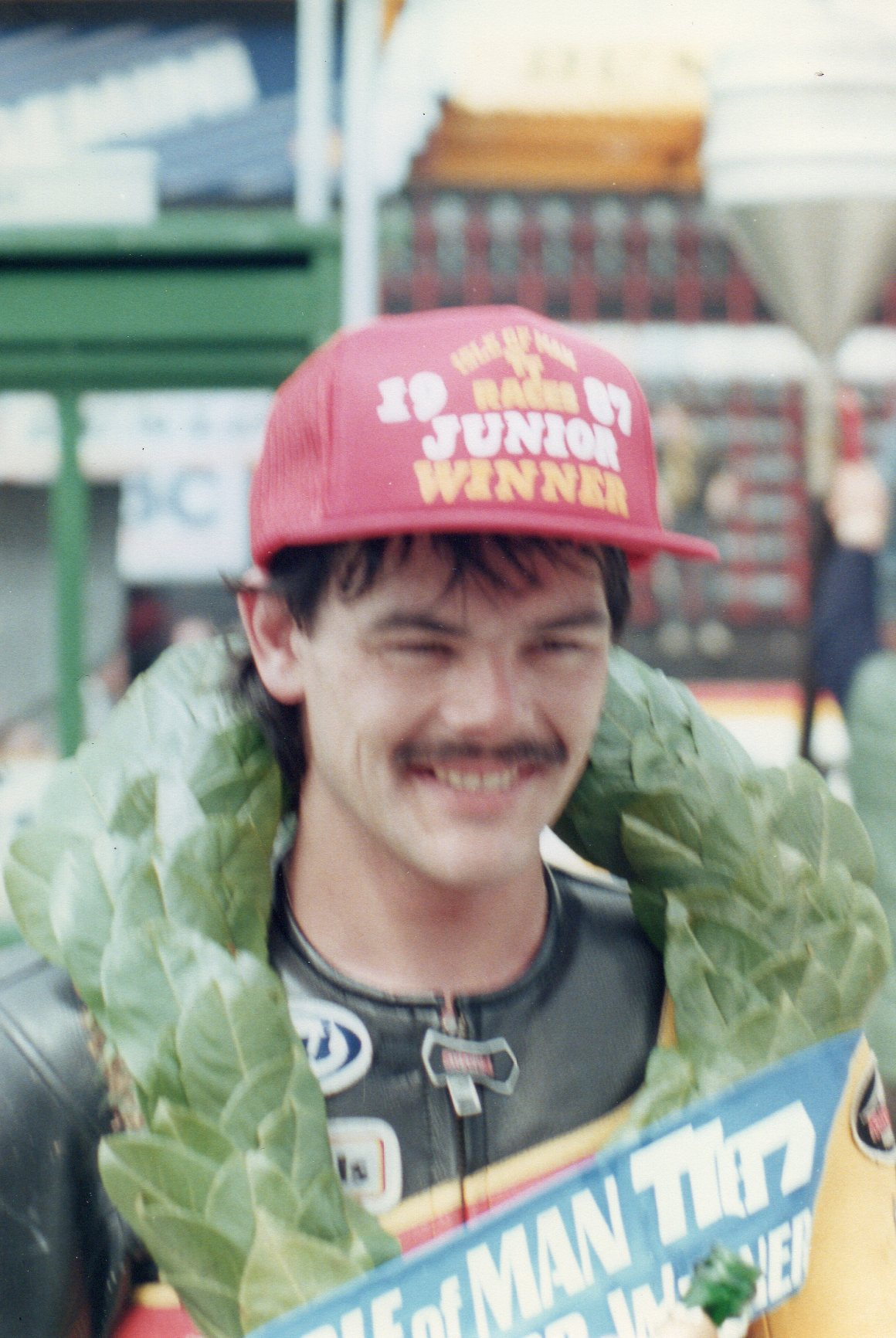
- Eddie after winning the 1987 Junior TT
- Nationality: (Republic of Ireland) Irish
- Born: 25 May 1961 (age 65); Dublin, Ireland
Motorcycle racing career statistics
500cc World Championship
Active years	1988 – 1992
Manufacturers	Honda, Yamaha
Starts / Wins / Podiums / Poles / F. laps / Points; 48 / 0 / 0 / 0 / 0 / 93
Isle of Man TT career
TTs contested	21 (1982–1990)
TT wins	2
First TT win	1987 Junior TT
Last TT win	1989 Supersport 400
TT podiums	6
- North West 200 Wins 4
- Ulster Grand Prix wins 5

Eddie Laycock (born 25 May 1961) is an Irish former professional motorcycle racer.

== Motorcycle racing career ==
A two-time Isle of Man TT race winner, in 1986, Laycock finished runner-up to Brian Reid in the TT Formula 2 World Championship. In 1987, he beat Reid to win the Junior TT 250cc race, and in 1989 won the Supersport 400cc Race. He also competed in the 500cc World Championship on Millar Racing machines from 1988 to 1992, with a best race result of 9th at the Dutch TT in 1992, and a best championship ranking of 12th in 1991.

In 2015, Laycock and former sponsor Gerry Lawlor prepared a Yamaha TZ250 for Ian Lougher to ride in the Lightweight class at the Isle of Man Classic TT.

== Career statistics ==
=== Complete TT record ===
==== Races by year ====
(key)

1990	**Junior TT**; 3	**Senior TT**; 7	**Formula 1 TT**; Ret	**Supersport 400**; Ret	
1989	**Junior TT**; 2	**Senior TT**; 5	**Formula 1 TT**; Ret	**Supersport 400**; 1	
1988	**Junior TT**; 3	**Senior TT**; 8			**Production Class D** 5
1987	**Junior TT**; 1	**Senior TT**; 10	**Formula 1 TT**; 12	**Formula 2**; 2	**Production Class B** 23
1986	**Junior TT**; Ret			**Formula 2**; 5	
1985	**Junior TT**; Ret				
1982	**Junior TT**; Ret	**Senior 350cc TT**; Ret			

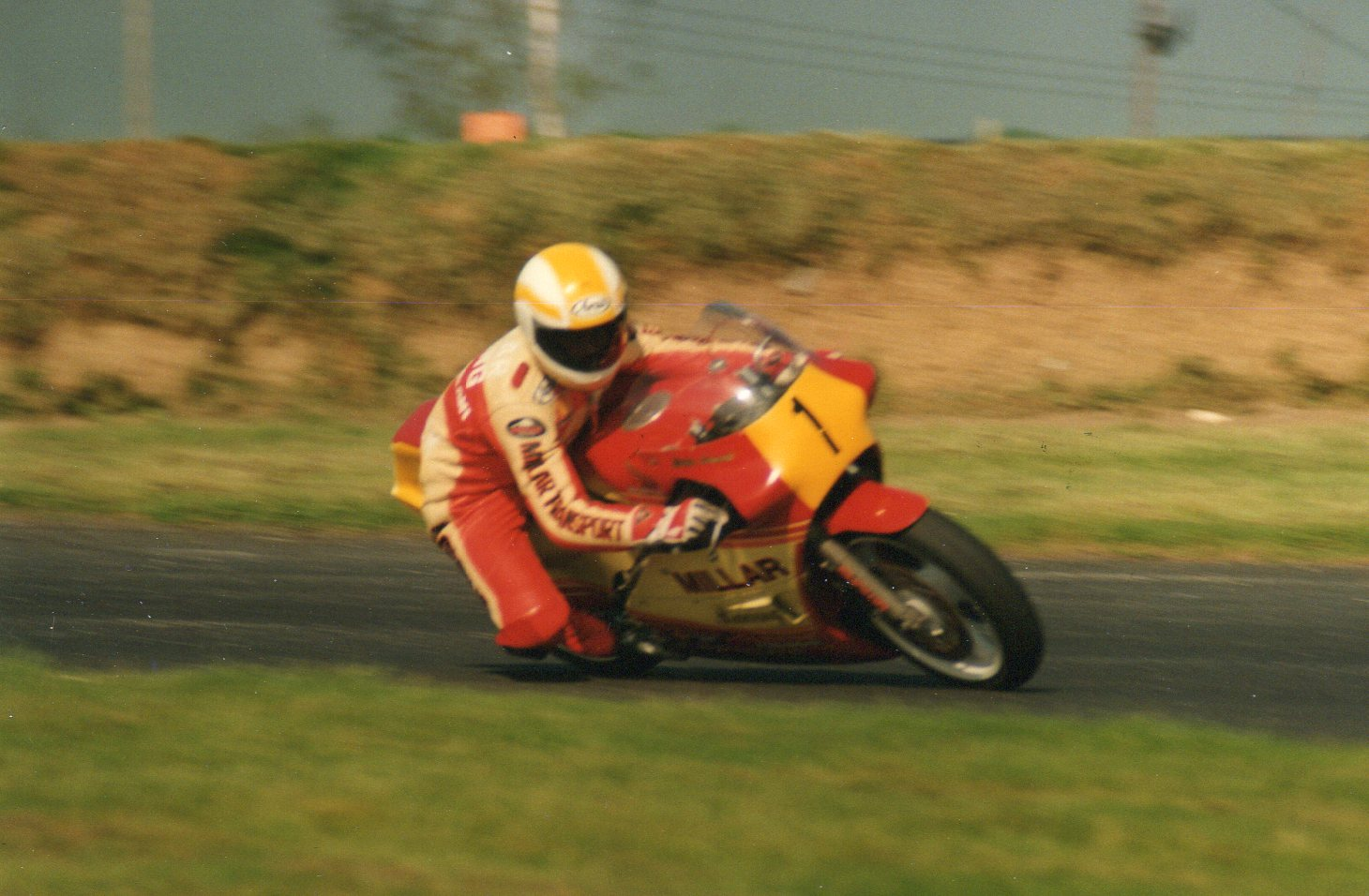
Eddie on the Millar Racing NS500 Honda

=== North West 200 Record : 4 Victories ===
==== Races by year ====
Year	Class/Race	Machine	Position	Source
1982	250cc	Yamaha	7th	Motocourse 1982
1983	350cc	Yamaha	5th	Motocourse 1983
1983	250cc	Yamaha	6th	Motocourse 1983
1986	250cc Race 1	EMC	1st	Rothmans Grand Prix Motorcycle Year Book 1986-87
1986	250cc Race 2	EMC	2nd	Rothmans Grand Prix Motorcycle Year Book 1986-87
1987	350cc Race 2	Yamaha	1st	Rothmans Grand Prix Motorcycle Year Book 1986-87
1987	Superbike	Yamaha	5th	Rothmans Grand Prix Motorcycle Year Book 1986-87
1988	250/350cc	Yamaha	5th	Rothmans Grand Prix Motorcycle Year Book 1988-89
1988	Superbike	Honda	2nd	Rothmans Grand Prix Motorcycle Year Book 1988-89
1989	Prince of the Roads 250/350cc	Yamaha	Ret	The Power and the Glory, The History of the North West 200
1989	250/350cc Race 2	Yamaha	3rd	The Power and the Glory, The History of the North West 200
1989	King of the Roads 750cc	Honda	2nd	The Power and the Glory, The History of the North West 200
1989	NW200 Superbike	Honda	Ret	The Power and the Glory, The History of the North West 200
1990	250cc Race 1	Yamaha	1st	The Power and the Glory, The History of the North West 200
1990	250cc Race 2	Yamaha	1st	The Power and the Glory, The History of the North West 200
1990	Superbike Race 1	Honda	3rd	The Power and the Glory, The History of the North West 200
1990	Superbike Race 2	Honda	3rd	The Power and the Glory, The History of the North West 200

=== Ulster Grand Prix Record : 5 Victories ===
==== Races by year ====
Year	Class/Race	Machine	Position	Source
1981	250cc	Yamaha	8th	Motocourse 1981
1983	250cc	Yamaha	4th	Motocourse 1983
1983	500cc	Yamaha	8th	Motocourse 1983
1984	350cc	Yamaha	Ret	Days of Thunder, The History of the Ulster Grand Prix
1985	Formula 2	Yamaha	2nd	Days of Thunder, The History of the Ulster Grand Prix
1986	Formula 2	Yamaha	1st	Rothmans Grand Prix Motorcycle Year Book 1986-87
1986	350cc	Yamaha	1st	Rothmans Grand Prix Motorcycle Year Book 1986-87
1988	350cc Race 1	EMC	2nd	Rothmans Grand Prix Motorcycle Year Book 1988-89
1988	350cc Race 2	EMC	4th	Rothmans Grand Prix Motorcycle Year Book 1988-89
1988	Senior	Honda	1st	Rothmans Grand Prix Motorcycle Year Book 1988-89
1989	Prince of the Roads 250/350cc	Yamaha	1st	Days of Thunder, The History of the Ulster Grand Prix
1989	Supersport 400	Suzuki	1st	Days of Thunder, The History of the Ulster Grand Prix
1989	King of the Roads	Honda	3rd	Days of Thunder, The History of the Ulster Grand Prix
1990	King of the Roads	Honda	3rd	Days of Thunder, The History of the Ulster Grand Prix

=== TT Formula 2 World Championship ===
==== Races by year ====
(key)

Year	Bike	1	2	3	4	Pos.	Pts
1985	Yamaha	**Isle of Man TT**	**Vilareal, Portugal**	**Montjuic, Spain**	**Ulster GP**; 2	8th	12
1986	Yamaha	**Isle of Man TT**; 5	**Jerez, Spain**; 6	**Ulster GP**; 1		2nd	26

=== Grand Prix motorcycle racing ===
==== Races by year ====
(key) (Races in bold indicate pole position) (Races in italics indicate fastest lap)

Year	Class	Bike	1	2	3	4	5	6	7	8	9	10	11	12	13	14	15	Pos.	Pts
1988	500cc	Honda	JPN	USA	SPA; Ret	EXP; Ret	NAT	GER	AUT	NED; 20	BEL; 17	YUG; 20	FRA; 21	GBR; 17	SWE	CZE; Ret	BRA		0
1989	500cc	Honda	JPN	AUS	USA	SPA; 15	NAT	GER	AUT	YUG	NED; Ret	BEL; 14	FRA; 16	GBR; DNQ	SWE	CZE; 17	BRA	44th	2
1990	500cc	Honda	JPN	USA	SPA; 11	NAT	GER	AUT	YUG	NED; 12	BEL; 13	FRA; 11	GBR; 12	SWE	CZE; 14	HUN; 14	AUS; 11	17th	30
1991	500cc	Yamaha	JPN; Ret	AUS; 13	USA; 13	SPA; 11	ITA; 10	GER; 10	AUT; 10	EUR; 12	NED; Ret	FRA	GBR; 11	RSM; 11	CZE; 11	VDM; 11	MAL; 12	12th	57
1992	500cc	Yamaha	JPN; Ret	AUS; Ret	MAL; 10	SPA; Ret	ITA; 14	EUR; 19	GER; 15	NED; 9	HUN; 10	FRA; Ret	GBR; Ret	BRA; 20	RSA; 18			17th	4
