= 1991 Japanese motorcycle Grand Prix =

(Japan) 1991 Japanese Grand Prix
Race details
- Race 1 of 15 races in the 1991 Grand Prix motorcycle racing season
- Date: 24 March 1991
- Official name: Kibun Japanese Grand Prix
- Location: Suzuka Circuit
- Course: Permanent racing facility; 5.859 km (3.641 mi)

500cc
Pole position
| Rider | (United States) Kevin Schwantz | Suzuki |
| Time | 2:11.948 | |
Fastest lap
| Rider | (United States) John Kocinski | Yamaha |
| Time | 2:11.149 | |
Podium
| First | (United States) Kevin Schwantz | Suzuki |
| Second | (Australia) Michael Doohan | Honda |
| Third | (United States) Wayne Rainey | Yamaha |

250cc
Pole position
| Rider | (Netherlands) Wilco Zeelenberg | Honda |
| Time | 2:16.011 | |
Fastest lap
| Rider | (Italy) Luca Cadalora | Honda |
| Time | 2:15.075 | |
Podium
| First | (Italy) Luca Cadalora | Honda |
| Second | (Spain) Carlos Cardús | Honda |
| Third | (Netherlands) Wilco Zeelenberg | Honda |

125cc
Pole position
| Rider | (Japan) Noboru Ueda | Honda |
| Time | 2:24.623 | |
Fastest lap
| Rider | (Japan) Noboru Ueda | Honda |
| Time | 2:22.264 | |
Podium
| First | (Japan) Noboru Ueda | Honda |
| Second | (Italy) Fausto Gresini | Honda |
| Third | (Italy) Loris Capirossi | Honda |

The 1991 Japanese motorcycle Grand Prix was the first round of the 1991 Grand Prix motorcycle racing season. It took place on the weekend of 22–24 March 1991 at the Suzuka Circuit.

Noboru Ueda, who won the 125cc race on his Grand Prix motorcycle racing debut, would become the last rider to win on his debut until Can Öncü in 2018.

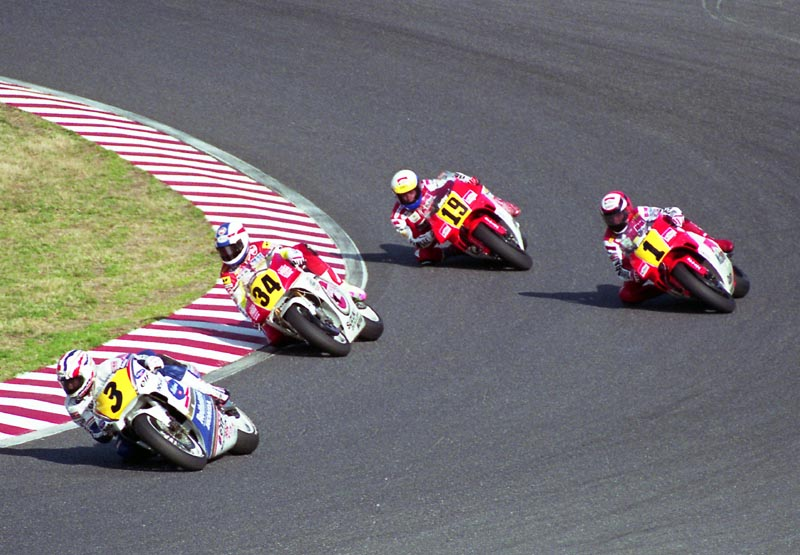
Mick Doohan (3) is followed by Kevin Schwantz (34), Wayne Rainey (1) and John Kocinski (19) in the 500 cc race.

== 500 cc classification ==
| Pos. | Rider | Team | Manufacturer | Laps | Time | Grid | Points |
|---|---|---|---|---|---|---|---|
| 1 | (United States) Kevin Schwantz | Lucky Strike Suzuki | Suzuki | 22 | 48:35.747 | 1 | 20 |
| 2 | (Australia) Michael Doohan | Rothmans Honda Team | Honda | 22 | +0.204 | 2 | 17 |
| 3 | (United States) Wayne Rainey | Marlboro Team Roberts | Yamaha | 22 | +0.353 | 5 | 15 |
| 4 | (United States) John Kocinski | Marlboro Team Roberts | Yamaha | 22 | +0.556 | 3 | 13 |
| 5 | (Australia) Wayne Gardner | Rothmans Honda Team | Honda | 22 | +35.311 | 11 | 11 |
| 6 | (United States) Eddie Lawson | Cagiva Corse | Cagiva | 22 | +44.915 | 6 | 10 |
| 7 | (Spain) Juan Garriga | Ducados Yamaha | Yamaha | 22 | +55.830 | 4 | 9 |
| 8 | (Spain) Sito Pons | Campsa Honda Team | Honda | 22 | +1:08.316 | 13 | 8 |
| 9 | (Japan) Kenichiro Iwahashi | Ajinomoto Honda | Honda | 22 | +1:08.373 | 10 | 7 |
| 10 | (Brazil) Alex Barros | Cagiva Corse | Cagiva | 22 | +1:15.302 | 8 | 6 |
| 11 | (United States) Doug Chandler | Roberts B Team | Yamaha | 22 | +1:15.595 | | 5 |
| 12 | (France) Adrien Morillas | Sonauto Yamaha Mobil 1 | Yamaha | 22 | +1:18.928 | | 4 |
| 13 | (Australia) Kevin Magee | Lucky Strike Suzuki | Suzuki | 22 | +1:20.899 | | 3 |
| 14 | (Belgium) Didier de Radiguès | Lucky Strike Suzuki | Suzuki | 22 | +1:22.472 | | 2 |
| 15 | (Australia) Peter Goddard | Itariya-Hayashi Racing | Yamaha | 22 | +1:22.696 | 12 | 1 |
| 16 | (Japan) Shinichi Itoh | Pentax Honda (HRC) | Honda | 22 | +1:38.831 | 9 | |
| 17 | (Japan) Toshihiko Honma | YMO (Yamaha Racing Team Roadrace) | Yamaha | 22 | +1:41.697 | | |
| 18 | (Japan) Kunio Machii | Nescafe Yamaha | Yamaha | 22 | +1:41.905 | | |
| 19 | (Japan) Satoshi Tsujimoto | Suzuki Racing Team | Suzuki | 22 | +1:54.952 | | |
| 20 | (Japan) Hikaru Miyagi | Ajinomoto Honda (HRC) | Honda | 22 | +1:55.213 | | |
| 21 | (Japan) Tatsuro Arata | Ito-en Racing | Yamaha | 21 | +1 lap | | |
| 22 | (Netherlands) Cees Doorakkers | HEK-Baumachines | Honda | 21 | +1 lap | | |
| Ret | (Republic of Ireland) Eddie Laycock | Millar Racing | Yamaha | 17 | Retired | | |
| Ret | (France) Jean-Philippe Ruggia | Sonauto Yamaha Mobil 1 | Yamaha | 9 | Retired | 7 | |
| Ret | (Japan) Keiji Ohishi | Camel Yamaha (Playmate Racing Team) | Yamaha | 9 | Retired | | |
| Ret | (Japan) Norihiko Fujiwara | Kirin Mets Racing Team | Yamaha | 7 | Retired | 15 | |
| Ret | (Japan) Osamu Hiwatashi | Suzuki Racing Team | Suzuki | 1 | Retired | | |
| Ret | (Japan) Tadahiko Taira | Yamaha Racing Team Roadrace | Yamaha | 1 | Retired | 14 | |
| DNQ | (Switzerland) Nicholas Schmassman | Schmassman Technotron | Honda | 0 | Did not qualify | | |

== 250 cc classification ==
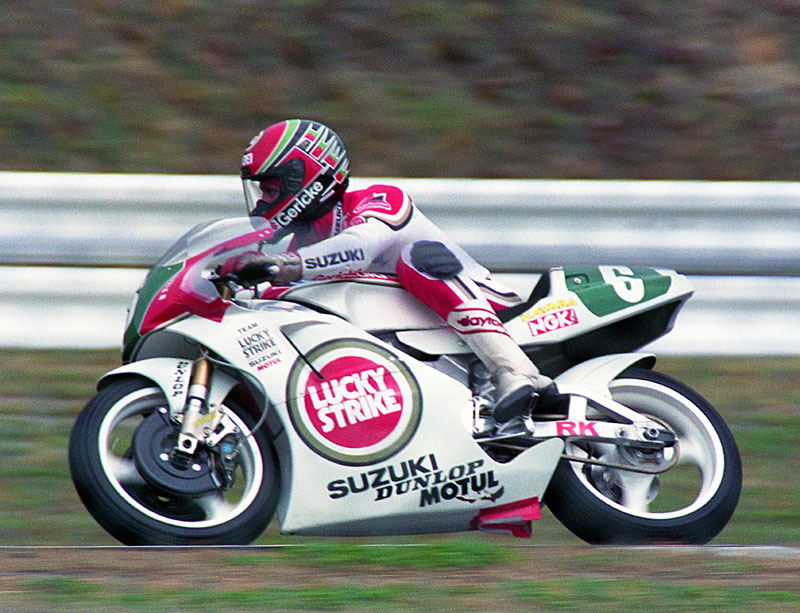
Martin Wimmer in the 250 cc race.

| Pos | Rider | Manufacturer | Laps | Time | Grid | Points |
|---|---|---|---|---|---|---|
| 1 | (Italy) Luca Cadalora | Honda | 20 | 45:23.048 | 8 | 20 |
| 2 | (Spain) Carlos Cardús | Honda | 20 | +0.255 | 2 | 17 |
| 3 | (Netherlands) Wilco Zeelenberg | Honda | 20 | +17.876 | 1 | 15 |
| 4 | (Japan) Masumitsu Taguchi | Honda | 20 | +21.180 | 9 | 13 |
| 5 | (Japan) Nobuatsu Aoki | Honda | 20 | +21.560 | 11 | 11 |
| 6 | (Japan) Tetsuya Harada | Yamaha | 20 | +21.570 | 3 | 10 |
| 7 | (Germany) Helmut Bradl | Honda | 20 | +22.060 | 6 | 9 |
| 8 | (Japan) Masahiro Shimizu | Honda | 20 | +23.103 | | 8 |
| 9 | (Italy) Loris Reggiani | Aprilia | 20 | +31.920 | 15 | 7 |
| 10 | (Japan) Tsutomu Udagawa | Honda | 20 | +37.366 | 4 | 6 |
| 11 | (Japan) Katsuyoshi Kozono | Honda | 20 | +37.953 | 7 | 5 |
| 12 | (Japan) Kyoji Namba | Yamaha | 20 | +40.569 | 12 | 4 |
| 13 | (Germany) Jochen Schmid | Honda | 20 | +56.684 | | 3 |
| 14 | (Germany) Martin Wimmer | Suzuki | 20 | +56.734 | 10 | 2 |
| 15 | (Japan) Toshiyuki Arakaki | Honda | 20 | +57.140 | | 1 |
| 16 | (Japan) Osamu Miyazaki | Yamaha | 20 | +58.962 | | |
| 17 | (Italy) Pierfrancesco Chili | Aprilia | 20 | +1:00.083 | 13 | |
| 18 | (France) Jean-Pierre Jeandat | Honda | 20 | +1:03.334 | | |
| 19 | (Austria) Andreas Preining | Aprilia | 20 | +1:08.539 | | |
| 20 | (Germany) Stefan Prein | Honda | 20 | +1:10.775 | | |
| 21 | (Spain) Alberto Puig | Yamaha | 20 | +1:31.053 | | |
| 22 | (Japan) Takehiko Kurokawa | Honda | 20 | +1:34.951 | | |
| 23 | (Netherlands) Leon van der Heyden | Honda | 20 | +1:35.323 | | |
| 24 | (Japan) Yoshomasa Kato | Yamaha | 20 | +1:38.026 | | |
| 25 | (Venezuela) Carlos Lavado | Yamaha | 20 | +1:41.074 | | |
| 26 | (Italy) Paolo Casoli | Yamaha | 20 | +1:48.765 | | |
| 27 | (Switzerland) Urs Jucker | Yamaha | 20 | +2:07.587 | | |
| 28 | (Sweden) Peter Linden | Honda | 20 | +2:10.769 | | |
| 29 | (United Kingdom) Kevin Mitchell | Yamaha | 20 | +2:13.523 | | |
| 30 | (France) Frédéric Protat | Aprilia | 20 | +2:13.687 | | |
| 31 | (United States) Jim Filice | Yamaha | 19 | +1 lap | | |
| 32 | (Switzerland) Bernard Hänggeli | Aprilia | 19 | +1 lap | | |
| Ret | (Japan) Hiroyuki Yamagishi | Honda | 18 | Retired | | |
| Ret | (Spain) Jaime Mariano | Aprilia | 16 | Retired | | |
| Ret | (Spain) Àlex Crivillé | Honda | 13 | Retired | 14 | |
| Ret | (Italy) Corrado Catalano | Honda | 6 | Retired | | |
| Ret | (Japan) Tadayuki Okada | Honda | 5 | Retired | 5 | |
| Ret | (Italy) Doriano Romboni | Honda | 1 | Retired | | |

== 125 cc classification ==
| Pos | Rider | Manufacturer | Laps | Time | Grid | Points |
|---|---|---|---|---|---|---|
| 1 | (Japan) Noboru Ueda | Honda | 16 | 38:26.905 | 1 | 20 |
| 2 | (Italy) Fausto Gresini | Honda | 16 | +2.553 | 3 | 17 |
| 3 | (Italy) Loris Capirossi | Honda | 16 | +8.676 | 2 | 15 |
| 4 | (Japan) Masato Shima | Honda | 16 | +15.917 | 10 | 13 |
| 5 | (Spain) Jorge Martínez | JJ Cobas | 16 | +33.737 | | 11 |
| 6 | (Switzerland) Heinz Lüthi | Honda | 16 | +37.389 | 11 | 10 |
| 7 | (Germany) Ralf Waldmann | Honda | 16 | +37.546 | | 9 |
| 8 | (Japan) Akira Saito | Honda | 16 | +38.930 | 12 | 8 |
| 9 | (Japan) Soichiro Sato | Honda | 16 | +39.174 | 15 | 7 |
| 10 | (Germany) Adolf Stadler | JJ Cobas | 16 | +39.327 | 5 | 6 |
| 11 | (Italy) Gabriele Debbia | Aprilia | 16 | +39.380 | 13 | 5 |
| 12 | (Japan) Nobuyuki Wakai | Honda | 16 | +39.425 | 4 | 4 |
| 13 | (Japan) Yosuke Yamakawa | Honda | 16 | +45.178 | 8 | 3 |
| 14 | (Italy) Gimmi Bosio | Honda | 16 | +47.160 | | 2 |
| 15 | (Japan) Kinya Wada | Honda | 16 | +47.506 | | 1 |
| 16 | (Netherlands) Hans Spaan | Honda | 16 | +47.883 | 7 | |
| 17 | (Japan) Masayuki Hirose | Honda | 16 | +48.032 | | |
| 18 | (Japan) Koji Takada | Honda | 16 | +54.478 | | |
| 19 | (Japan) Hisashi Unemoto | Honda | 16 | +54.555 | | |
| 20 | (Netherlands) Arie Molenaar | Honda | 16 | +1:03.982 | | |
| 21 | (Germany) Dirk Raudies | Honda | 16 | +1:05.364 | | |
| 22 | (United Kingdom) Steve Patrickson | Honda | 16 | +1:06.647 | | |
| 23 | (Japan) Hideaki Ueno | Honda | 16 | +1:06.674 | | |
| 24 | (Spain) Julián Miralles | JJ Cobas | 16 | +1:06.892 | | |
| 25 | (Italy) Alessandro Gramigni | Aprilia | 16 | +1:26.032 | | |
| 26 | (Finland) Johnny Wickström | Honda | 16 | +1:30.576 | | |
| 27 | (United Kingdom) Robin Appleyard | Honda | 16 | +1:30.874 | | |
| 28 | (Italy) Maurizio Vitali | Gazzaniga | 16 | +1:30.939 | | |
| 29 | (Switzerland) Thierry Feuz | Honda | 16 | +1:32.191 | | |
| 30 | (Switzerland) Oliver Petrucciani | Aprilia | 16 | +1:56.424 | | |
| 31 | (Australia) Peter Galvin | Honda | 16 | +1:56.544 | | |
| 32 | (Germany) Hubert Abold | Honda | 16 | +2:24.346 | | |
| 33 | (Spain) Manuel Herreros | JJ Cobas | 15 | +1 lap | | |
| Ret | (Italy) Ezio Gianola | Derbi | 13 | Retired | 14 | |
| Ret | (Japan) Masafumi Ono | Honda | 13 | Retired | 9 | |
| Ret | (Spain) Herri Torrontegui | JJ Cobas | 9 | Retired | | |
| Ret | (Italy) Bruno Casanova | Honda | 6 | Retired | 6 | |
| Ret | (Germany) Alfred Waibel | Honda | 6 | Retired | | |
| Ret | (Japan) Kazuto Sakata | Honda | 5 | Retired | | |
| Ret | (Italy) Emilio Cuppini | Gazzaniga | 2 | Retired | | |

| Previous race: 1990 Australian Grand Prix | FIM Grand Prix World Championship; 1991 season | Next race: 1991 Australian Grand Prix |
| Previous race: 1990 Japanese Grand Prix | Japanese Grand Prix | Next race: 1992 Japanese Grand Prix |
