= 1991 Australian motorcycle Grand Prix =

(Australia) 1991 Australian Grand Prix
Race details
- Race 2 of 15 races in the 1991 Grand Prix motorcycle racing season
- Date: 7 April 1991
- Official name: Tooheys Australian Motorcycle Grand Prix
- Location: Eastern Creek Raceway
- Course: Permanent racing facility; 3.930 km (2.442 mi)

500cc
Pole position
Rider	(United States) Wayne Rainey	Yamaha
Time	1:30.948	
Fastest lap
Rider	(United States) Wayne Rainey	Yamaha
Time	1:31.455	
Podium
First	(United States) Wayne Rainey	Yamaha
Second	(Australia) Michael Doohan	Honda
Third	(United States) John Kocinski	Yamaha

250cc
Pole position
Rider	(Italy) Luca Cadalora	Honda
Time	1:33.926	
Fastest lap
Rider	(Italy) Luca Cadalora	Honda
Time	1:34.180	
Podium
First	(Italy) Luca Cadalora	Honda
Second	(Germany) Helmut Bradl	Honda
Third	(Spain) Carlos Cardús	Honda

125cc
Pole position
Rider	(Italy) Loris Capirossi	Honda
Time	1:40.057	
Fastest lap
Rider	(Italy) Loris Capirossi	Honda
Time	1:39.401	
Podium
First	(Italy) Loris Capirossi	Honda
Second	(Italy) Fausto Gresini	Honda
Third	(Japan) Noboru Ueda	Honda

The 1991 Australian motorcycle Grand Prix was the second round of the 1991 Grand Prix motorcycle racing season. The race took place on the weekend of 5–7 April 1991 at Eastern Creek Raceway in Sydney, New South Wales. It was the first of six times the Australian motorcycle Grand Prix would be held at Eastern Creek before moving permanently back to Phillip Island in 1997.

== 500 cc classification ==
Pos.	Rider	Team	Manufacturer	Laps	Time	Grid	Points
1	(United States) Wayne Rainey	Marlboro Team Roberts	Yamaha	32	49:14.411	1	20
2	(Australia) Michael Doohan	Rothmans Honda Team	Honda	32	+2.549	3	17
3	(United States) John Kocinski	Marlboro Team Roberts	Yamaha	32	+9.457	4	15
4	(Australia) Wayne Gardner	Rothmans Honda Team	Honda	32	+24.437	2	13
5	(United States) Kevin Schwantz	Lucky Strike Suzuki	Suzuki	32	+29.177	6	11
6	(United States) Eddie Lawson	Cagiva Corse	Cagiva	32	+31.155	5	10
7	(France) Jean-Philippe Ruggia	Sonauto Yamaha Mobil 1	Yamaha	32	+37.849	9	9
8	(Brazil) Alex Barros	Cagiva Corse	Cagiva	32	+59.646	7	8
9	(France) Adrien Morillas	Sonauto Yamaha Mobil 1	Yamaha	32	+59.702	10	7
10	(Belgium) Didier de Radiguès	Lucky Strike Suzuki	Suzuki	32	+1:01.652	12	6
11	(Australia) Kevin Magee	Team Roberts	Suzuki	32	+1:20.599	11	5
12	(United States) Doug Chandler	Roberts B Team	Yamaha	32	+1:28.598	13	4
13	(Republic of Ireland) Eddie Laycock	Millar Racing	Yamaha	31	+1 lap	15	3
14	(Netherlands) Cees Doorakkers	HEK-Baumachines	Honda	30	+2 laps	16	2
15	(United Kingdom) Steve Spray	Team Roton	Roton	29	+3 laps	17	1
16	(Switzerland) Niggi Schmassman	Schmassman Technotron	Honda	28	+4 laps	18	
Ret	(Spain) Juan Garriga	Ducados Yamaha	Yamaha	13	Retired	8	
Ret	(Spain) Sito Pons	Campsa Honda Team	Honda	12	Retired	14	

== 250 cc classification ==
Pos	Rider	Manufacturer	Laps	Time	Grid	Points
1	(Italy) Luca Cadalora	Honda	28	44:19.673	1	20
2	(Germany) Helmut Bradl	Honda	28	+0.269	2	17
3	(Spain) Carlos Cardús	Honda	28	+11.833	3	15
4	(Netherlands) Wilco Zeelenberg	Honda	28	+15.394	4	13
5	(Italy) Loris Reggiani	Aprilia	28	+26.882	5	11
6	(Italy) Pierfrancesco Chili	Aprilia	28	+56.839	7	10
7	(Austria) Andreas Preining	Aprilia	28	+1:06.408	9	9
8	(Germany) Jochen Schmid	Honda	28	+1:14.223	10	8
9	(Italy) Paolo Casoli	Yamaha	28	+1:17.967	15	7
10	(Venezuela) Carlos Lavado	Yamaha	28	+1:18.302	13	6
11	(France) Jean-Pierre Jeandat	Honda	28	+1:30.197		5
12	(Switzerland) Bernard Hänggeli	Aprilia	28	+1:35.860		4
13	(France) Frédéric Protat	Aprilia	27	+1 lap		3
14	(Switzerland) Urs Jucker	Yamaha	27	+1 lap		2
15	(United Kingdom) Kevin Mitchell	Yamaha	27	+1 lap		1
16	(Australia) Stephen Whitehouse	Yamaha	27	+1 lap		
17	(Spain) Jaime Mariano	Aprilia	27	+1 lap		
18	(Australia) David Horton	Yamaha	27	+1 lap		
19	(Australia) Gavin Johnston	Yamaha	27	+1 lap		
20	(Australia) Warren Palesy	Yamaha	27	+1 lap		
21	(Australia) Michael Haisman	Yamaha	27	+1 lap		
22	(New Zealand) Scott Buckley	Yamaha	26	+2 laps		
Ret	(Germany) Stefan Prein	Honda	26	Retired	14	
Ret	(Japan) Masahiro Shimizu	Honda	21	Retired	12	
Ret	(United States) Jim Filice	Yamaha	21	Retired		
Ret	(Australia) Darren Milner	Yamaha	14	Retired		
Ret	(Germany) Martin Wimmer	Suzuki	13	Retired	6	
Ret	(Spain) Alberto Puig	Yamaha	4	Retired		
Ret	(Australia) Trevor Manley	Yamaha	3	Retired		
Ret	(Spain) Àlex Crivillé	Honda	3	Retired	11	
Ret	(Netherlands) Leon van der Heyden	Honda	2	Retired		
Ret	(Italy) Doriano Romboni	Honda	1	Retired	8	
Ret	(Germany) Harald Eckl	Aprilia	0	Retired		
Ret	(Australia) Ricky Rice	Yamaha	0	Retired		
Ret	(Sweden) Peter Linden	Honda	0	Retired		
Ret	(Italy) Corrado Catalano	Honda	0	Retired		
Ret	(United Kingdom) Ian Newton	Yamaha	0	Retired		

== 125 cc classification ==
Pos	Rider	Manufacturer	Laps	Time	Grid	Points
1	(Italy) Loris Capirossi	Honda	24	40:15.516	1	20
2	(Italy) Fausto Gresini	Honda	24	+5.764	5	17
3	(Japan) Noboru Ueda	Honda	24	+13.068	3	15
4	(Italy) Ezio Gianola	Derbi	24	+16.617	2	13
5	(Germany) Ralf Waldmann	Honda	24	+22.713	8	11
6	(Japan) Koji Takada	Honda	24	+34.286		10
7	(Switzerland) Heinz Lüthi	Honda	24	+34.725	4	9
8	(Italy) Alessandro Gramigni	Aprilia	24	+34.780	10	8
9	(Netherlands) Hans Spaan	Honda	24	+42.294	13	7
10	(Spain) Jorge Martínez	JJ Cobas	24	+47.291	9	6
11	(Germany) Dirk Raudies	Honda	24	+47.581	15	5
12	(Italy) Maurizio Vitali	Gazzaniga	24	+47.659	11	4
13	(United Kingdom) Steve Patrickson	Honda	24	+47.939		3
14	(Australia) Peter Galvin	Honda	24	+48.364	14	2
15	(Japan) Hisashi Unemoto	Honda	24	+57.904		1
16	(Japan) Kazuto Sakata	Honda	24	+58.009		
17	(Spain) Julián Miralles	JJ Cobas	24	+59.981		
18	(Spain) Herri Torrontegui	JJ Cobas	24	+1:01.287		
19	(Italy) Emilio Cuppini	Gazzaniga	24	+1:08.358		
20	(Finland) Johnny Wickström	Honda	24	+1:15.742		
21	(United Kingdom) Robin Appleyard	Honda	24	+1:15.941		
22	(Italy) Gimmi Bosio	Honda	24	+1:18.526		
23	(Germany) Alfred Waibel	Honda	24	+1:26.064		
24	(Japan) Kinya Wada	Honda	24	+1:26.303		
25	(Switzerland) Thierry Feuz	Honda	24	+1:26.644		
26	(United Kingdom) Alan Patterson	Honda	24	+1:46.388		
27	(Germany) Hubert Abold	Honda	23	+1 lap		
28	(Australia) Linda Walsh	Honda	23	+1 lap		
29	(Switzerland) René Dünki	Honda	23	+1 lap		
30	(Australia) Kenneth Fisher	Honda	23	+1 lap		
31	(Australia) Tony Daly	Honda	23	+1 lap		
32	(Australia) Tony Sims	Honda	23	+1 lap		
33	(Australia) Peter Scott	Honda	22	+2 laps		
Ret	(Italy) Gabriele Debbia	Aprilia	17	Retired	6	
Ret	(Spain) Manuel Herreros	JJ Cobas	17	Retired		
Ret	(Spain) Javier Debon	JJ Cobas	11	Retired		
Ret	(Italy) Bruno Casanova	Honda	9	Retired	12	
Ret	(Switzerland) Olivier Petrucciani	Aprilia	7	Retired		
Ret	(Germany) Adolf Stadler	JJ Cobas	3	Retired	7	

Previous race: 1991 Japanese Grand Prix	FIM Grand Prix World Championship; 1991 season	Next race: 1991 United States Grand Prix
Previous race: 1990 Australian Grand Prix	Australian motorcycle Grand Prix	Next race: 1992 Australian Grand Prix
