= 1991 Grand Prix motorcycle racing season =

Sports season

The 1991 Grand Prix motorcycle racing season was the 43rd F.I.M. Road Racing World Championship season.

== Season summary ==
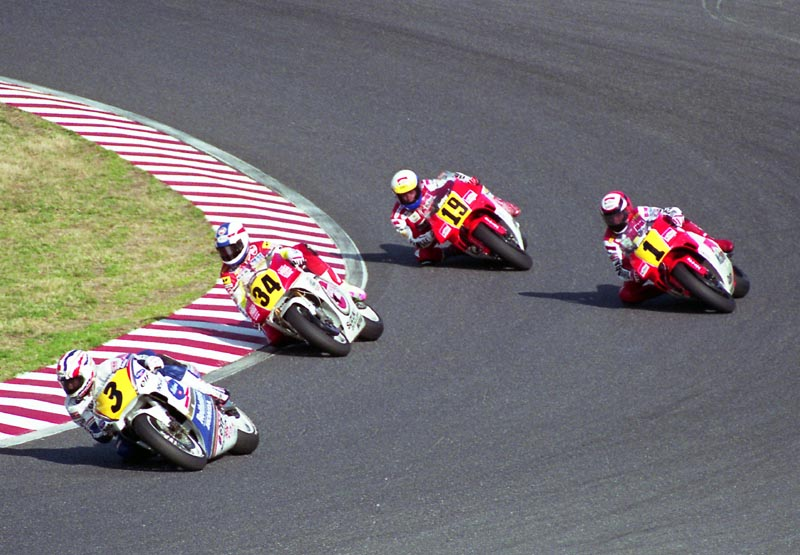
Mick Doohan (3) leads Kevin Schwantz (34), Wayne Rainey (1) and John Kocinski (19) at the 1991 Japanese Grand Prix

The beginning of the 1990s marked a golden age for Grand Prix motorcycle racing. The rivalry between Wayne Rainey and Kevin Schwantz was in full flow while Mick Doohan started to come into his own. Eddie Lawson had switched to Cagiva and started to have some respectable results. In a one-year quirk, only 13 races counted, as competitors were allowed to drop their two worst scores. The Yugoslavia round was dropped because of the civil war and replaced with a Grand Prix of Europe at Jarama. The Brazilian round was also dropped at the last minute over track safety concerns and replaced with a race held at Le Mans. The inaugural Malaysian Grand Prix was held at Shah Alam.

For the 1991 season, Michelin decided to supply only the Rothmans Honda team with tires; everybody else used Dunlops.

Luca Cadalora won the 250 title in a dominating fashion with eight wins. In the 125 class, Italian teenager Loris Capirossi swept to the title for the second consecutive year.

== 1991 Grand Prix season calendar ==
The following Grands Prix were scheduled to take place in 1991:

Round	Date	Grand Prix	Circuit
1	24 March	(Japan) Kibun Japanese Grand Prix	Suzuka Circuit
2	7 April	(Australia) Tooheys Australian Motorcycle Grand Prix	Eastern Creek Raceway
3	21 April	United States International Grand Prix	Laguna Seca Raceway
4	12 May	(Spain) Gran Premio de España	Circuito Permanente de Jerez
5	19 May	(Italy) Gran Premio d'Italia	Misano World Circuit
6	26 May	(Germany) Großer Preis von Deutschland für Motorräder	Hockenheimring
7	9 June	(Austria) Großer Preis von Österreich	Salzburgring
8	16 June	(Europe) G.P de Europa	Circuito Permanente Del Jarama
9	29 June	(Netherlands) Dutch TT	TT Circuit Assen
10	21 July	Grand Prix de France	Circuit Paul Ricard
11	4 August	(United Kingdom) Shell British Motorcycle Grand Prix	Donington Park
12	18 August	San Marino Grand Prix	Mugello Circuit
13	25 August	(Czechoslovakia) Czechoslovak motorcycle Grand Prix	Brno Circuit
14	8 September	(Pays de la Loire) Vitesse du Mans Grand Prix	Bugatti Circuit
15	29 September	Lucky Strike Malaysia Grand Prix	Shah Alam Circuit

=== Calendar changes ===
- The Australian Grand Prix was moved forward, from 16 September to 7 April.
- The German Grand Prix moved from the Nürburgring to the Hockenheimring.
- The Yugoslavian Grand Prix was cancelled due to the ongoing Yugoslav Wars.
- The Brazilian Grand Prix was initially scheduled, but was cancelled on the last moment due to poor safety standards of the venue.
- The Belgian, Swedish and Hungarian Grand Prix were taken off the calendar due to organisational and other type of problems.
- The European Grand Prix was added to the calendar as a replacement for the Yugoslavian Grand Prix.
- The San Marino Grand Prix returned after a three-year absence on the Mugello circuit.
- The French Grand Prix moved from the Bugatti Circuit in Le Mans to the Paul Ricard circuit.
- The Vitesse du Mans Grand Prix was added as a one-off Grand Prix to replace the Brazilian Grand Prix and was held on the Bugatti Circuit in Le Mans.
- The Malaysian Grand Prix was added to the calendar.

== 1991 Grand Prix season results ==
=== Grands Prix ===
Round	Date	Race	Location	125cc winner	250cc winner	500cc winner	Report
1	24 March	(Japan) Japanese Grand Prix	Suzuka	(Japan) Noboru Ueda	(Italy) Luca Cadalora	(United States) Kevin Schwantz	Report
2	7 April	(Australia) Australian Grand Prix	Eastern Creek	(Italy) Loris Capirossi	(Italy) Luca Cadalora	(United States) Wayne Rainey	Report
3	21 April	United States Grand Prix	Laguna Seca		(Italy) Luca Cadalora	(United States) Wayne Rainey	Report
4	12 May	(Spain) Spanish Grand Prix	Jerez	(Japan) Noboru Ueda	(Germany) Helmut Bradl	(Australia) Mick Doohan	Report
5	19 May	(Italy) Italian Grand Prix	Misano	(Italy) Fausto Gresini	(Italy) Luca Cadalora	(Australia) Mick Doohan	Report
6	26 May	(Germany) German Grand Prix	Hockenheim	(Germany) Ralf Waldmann	(Germany) Helmut Bradl	(United States) Kevin Schwantz	Report
7	9 June	(Austria) Austrian Grand Prix	Salzburgring	(Italy) Fausto Gresini	(Germany) Helmut Bradl	(Australia) Mick Doohan	Report
8	16 June	(Europe) European Grand Prix	Jarama	(Italy) Loris Capirossi	(Italy) Luca Cadalora	(United States) Wayne Rainey	Report
9	29 June	(Netherlands) Dutch TT	Assen	(Germany) Ralf Waldmann	(Italy) Pierfrancesco Chili	(United States) Kevin Schwantz	Report
10	21 July	(France) French Grand Prix	Paul Ricard	(Italy) Loris Capirossi	(Italy) Loris Reggiani	(United States) Wayne Rainey	Report
11	4 August	(United Kingdom) British Grand Prix	Donington	(Italy) Loris Capirossi	(Italy) Luca Cadalora	(United States) Kevin Schwantz	Report
12	18 August	San Marino Grand Prix	Mugello	(Germany) Peter Öttl	(Italy) Luca Cadalora	(United States) Wayne Rainey	Report
13	25 August	(Czechoslovakia) Czechoslovak Grand Prix	Brno	(Italy) Alessandro Gramigni	(Germany) Helmut Bradl	(United States) Wayne Rainey	Report
14	8 September	(Pays de la Loire) Vitesse du Mans Grand Prix	Le Mans		(Germany) Helmut Bradl	(United States) Kevin Schwantz	Report
15	29 September	(Malaysia) Malaysian Grand Prix	Shah Alam	(Italy) Loris Capirossi	(Italy) Luca Cadalora	(United States) John Kocinski	Report

== Participants ==
=== 500cc participants ===
Team	Constructor	Motorcycle	No.	Rider	Rounds
Marlboro Team Roberts	Yamaha	Yamaha YZR500	1	(United States) Wayne Rainey	1–14
Marlboro Team Roberts	Yamaha	Yamaha YZR500	19	(United States) John Kocinski	All
Marlboro Team Roberts	Yamaha	Yamaha YZR500	46	(United States) Robbie Petersen	3
Marlboro Team Roberts	Yamaha	Yamaha YZR500	97	(United States) Rich Oliver	3
Team Roberts Yamaha	Yamaha	Yamaha YZR500	9	(Australia) Kevin Magee	15
Castrol Yamaha/Team Roberts	Yamaha	Yamaha YZR500	4	(United Kingdom) Niall Mackenzie	11
Team Roberts Yamaha/Castrol	Yamaha	Yamaha YZR500	21	(United States) Doug Chandler	All
Rothmans Honda	Honda	Honda NSR500	3	(Australia) Mick Doohan	All
Rothmans Honda	Honda	Honda NSR500	5	(Australia) Wayne Gardner	1–4, 6–15
Yamaha Sonauto Mobil 1	Yamaha	Yamaha YZR500	4	(United Kingdom) Niall Mackenzie	12, 14–15
Yamaha Sonauto Mobil 1	Yamaha	Yamaha YZR500	8	(France) Jean-Philippe Ruggia	1–5, 8–12, 14–15
Yamaha Sonauto Mobil 1	Yamaha	Yamaha YZR500	20	(France) Adrien Morillas	1–12, 14–15
Ducados Yamaha	Yamaha	Yamaha YZR500	6	(Spain) Joan Garriga	All
Cagiva	Cagiva	Cagiva GP500 C591	7	(United States) Eddie Lawson	1–13
Cagiva	Cagiva	Cagiva GP500 C591	11	(Italy) Marco Papa	7–8, 11–12, 14–15
Cagiva	Cagiva	Cagiva GP500 C591	12	(Brazil) Alex Barros	1–3, 5, 9
Cagiva	Cagiva	Cagiva GP500 C591	33	(France) Raymond Roche	0 (10)
Team Lucky Strike Suzuki	Suzuki	Suzuki RGV500	9	(Australia) Kevin Magee	1–2
Team Lucky Strike Suzuki	Suzuki	Suzuki RGV500	27	(Belgium) Didier de Radiguès	All
Team Lucky Strike Suzuki	Suzuki	Suzuki RGV500	34	(United States) Kevin Schwantz	1–14
Campsa Honda	Honda	Honda NSR500	10	(Spain) Sito Pons	1–3, 8–15
Moto Club Milano/Team Papa	Honda	Honda RS500	11; 18	(Italy) Marco Papa	4–5, 10
Technotron	Honda	Honda NSR500	13	(Switzerland) Niggi Schmassman	2–5, 8–11, 13, 15
Norton/JPS Racing	Norton	Norton RCW588	15	(United Kingdom) Ron Haslam	11
HEK-Bauwmachines	Honda	Honda RS500	16	(Netherlands) Cees Doorakkers	All
Millar Racing	Yamaha	Yamaha YZR500	17	(Republic of Ireland) Eddie Laycock	1–9, 11–15
Librenti Corse	VRP-Suzuki Honda	Suzuki RGV500; Honda RS500	23	(Luxembourg) Andy Leuthe	8, 11–14
R.S. Rallye Sport	Honda	Honda NSR500	24	(Switzerland) Helmut Schütz	9, 11–12
R.S. Rallye Sport	Honda	Honda NSR500	32; 35; 39	(Germany) Michael Rudroff	4–14
Itoen	Yamaha	Yamaha YZR500	25	(Japan) Tatsuro Arata	1
Pentax	Honda	Honda NSR500	28	(Japan) Shinichi Ito	1
Domina	Domina	??	29	(Venezuela) Larry Moreno Vacondio	0 (5, 12)
MT Racing	Honda	Honda NSR500	30	(Germany) Martin Trösch	13
Team Paton	Paton	Paton V115 500	30; 37; 38; 39	(Italy) Michele Valdo	10–12
Roton	Roton	Norton RCW588	31	(United Kingdom) Steve Spray	2
??	Honda	Honda RS500	31; 36	(Italy) Romolo Balbi	5, 12
Doppler Racing	Honda	Honda RS500	33; 35; 36; 37; 38	(Austria) Josef Doppler	8, 10–13, 15
Kirin Mets	Yamaha	Yamaha YZR500	35	(Japan) Norihiko Fujiwara	1
Bimota Experience	Bimota Suzuki	Bimota Tesi 500; Suzuki RGV500	35; 37	(Italy) Vittorio Scatola	??
Romero Racing Team	Yamaha	Yamaha TZ500	35; 36; 38; 40	(Germany) Hans Becker	4–6, 8–15
Ajinomoto	Honda	Honda NSR500	36	(Japan) Hikaru Miyagi	1
Ajinomoto	Honda	Honda NSR500	41	(Japan) Keiichiro Iwahashi	1
Padgett's Racing Team	Suzuki	Suzuki RG 500 gamma	36; 37; 39	(United Kingdom) Simon Buckmaster	5–6, 8–10, 12–13
Nescafé	Yamaha	Yamaha YZR500	37	(Japan) Kunio Machii	1
S.R.T.	Suzuki	Suzuki RGV500	38	(Japan) Osamu Hiwatashi	1
S.R.T.	Suzuki	Suzuki RGV500	40	(Japan) Satoshi Tsujimoto	1
Camel	Yamaha	Yamaha YZR500	39	(Japan) Keiji Ohishi	1
Y.R.T.R.	Yamaha	Yamaha YZR500	44	(Japan) Tadahiko Taira	1
BMO-2RS Yamaha	Yamaha	Yamaha YZR500	45	(Japan) Toshihiko Honma	1
Hayashi	Yamaha	Yamaha YZR500	46	(Australia) Peter Goddard	1
Vogt	??	??	50	(Chile) Vincenzo Cascino	0 (13)

Key
Regular Rider
Wildcard Rider
Replacement Rider

=== 250cc participants ===
Team	Constructor	Motorcycle	No.	Rider	Rounds
Repsol-Honda/Cardús	Honda	Honda NSR250	2	(Spain) Carlos Cardús	All
Rothmans-Kanemoto Honda	Honda	Honda NSR250	3	(Italy) Luca Cadalora	All
HB Honda Racing Team Germany	Honda	Honda NSR250	4	(Germany) Helmut Bradl	All
HB Honda Racing Team Germany	Honda	Honda RS250R	33	(Germany) Stefan Prein	1–3, 5–15
Sharp-Samson-Bieffe Team	Honda	Honda NSR250	5	(Netherlands) Wilco Zeelenberg	All
Sharp-Samson-Bieffe Team	Honda	Honda RS250R	21	(Germany) Leon van der Heyden	1–5, 8–9
Team Lucky Strike Suzuki	Suzuki	Suzuki RGV250	6	(Germany) Martin Wimmer	All
Team Lucky Strike Suzuki	Suzuki	Suzuki RGV250	72	(Spain) Herri Torrontégui	9–14
HRC Honda/Ajinomoto	Honda	Honda NSR250	7	(Japan) Masahiro Shimizu	All
HRC	Honda	Honda NSR250	29	(Japan) Tadayuki Okada	1
Schuh-Zwafink Racing	Honda	Honda RS250R	8	(Germany) Jochen Schmid	All
Iberna Aprilia/Valesi Racing	Aprilia	Aprilia RSV 250	9	(Italy) Pierfrancesco Chili	All
Iberna Aprilia/Valesi Racing	Aprilia	Aprilia RSV 250	27	(Italy) Renzo Colleoni	4–15
Team Gallina/Compagnucci	Yamaha	Yamaha TZ 250	10	(France) Dominique Sarron	4, 6, 8
Team Gallina	Yamaha	Yamaha TZ 250	23	(United States) Jim Filice	1–3
Team Gallina	Yamaha	Yamaha TZ 250	63; 52; 41	(Italy) Stefano Caracchi	11–14
Marlboro/JJ Cobas	JJ Cobas	JJ Cobas Honda 250	11	(Spain) Àlex Crivillé	All
Aprilia Unlimited Jeans Team	Aprilia	Aprilia RSV 250	13	(Italy) Loris Reggiani	All
Flygvapnet	Honda	Honda RS250R	14	(Sweden) Peter Lindén	1–2, 6–7, 9–11, 13
Team Greco	Yamaha	Yamaha TZ 250	15	(Venezuela) Carlos Lavado	1–6, 9–12
Ducados Yamaha Puig	Yamaha	Yamaha YZR 250	16	(Spain) Alberto Puig	1–5, 9–15
Team Agostini/API	Yamaha	Yamaha TZ 250	17	(Italy) Paolo Casoli	All
ÖKM-Aprilia/SK Vöst	Aprilia	Aprilia RSV 250	18	(Austria) Andy Preining	1–14
OZ Racing System	Aprilia	Aprilia RSV 250	19	(Italy) Marcellino Lucchi	4–14
OZ Racing System	Aprilia	Aprilia RSV 250	52; 45; 49; 46	(Italy) Renato Colleoni	5, 7, 9, 12
HB Honda Racing Team Italy	Honda	Honda RS250R	20	(Italy) Doriano Romboni	1–8, 12–15
LMC Pennesse Racing	Aprilia	Aprilia RSV 250	22	(Italy) Stefano Pennesse	5, 7–9, 11–13
LMC Pennesse Racing	Aprilia	Aprilia RSV 250	25	(South Africa) Wayne Doran	??
JF-Aprilia-Kuhnert	Aprilia	Aprilia RSV 250	30	(Germany) Harald Eckl	2–15
Marlboro Aprilia Mohag	Aprilia	Aprilia RSV 250	32	(Switzerland) Bernard Häenggeli	All
Marlboro Aprilia Mohag	Aprilia	Aprilia RSV 250	49; 53; 55; 47	(Switzerland) Eskil Suter	7–8, 10–13
Docshop/Servopax	Aprilia	Aprilia RSV 250	34	(Netherlands) Patrick van den Goorbergh	4–14
Team St Yrian Motos	Yamaha	Yamaha TZ 250	36; 54; 37	(France) Jean Foray	4–14
Silkolene Honda Britain	Honda	Honda RS250R	39	(United Kingdom) Alan Carter	??
Silkolene Honda Britain	Honda	Honda RS250R	55; 57	(United Kingdom) Steve Hislop	10–11
FP Moto Team	Aprilia	Aprilia RSV 250	41; 48; 36; 69	(France) Frédéric Protat	1–5, 7–14
Medd Holdings	Yamaha	Yamaha TZ 250	42; 39; 46; 37	(United Kingdom) Kevin Mitchell	1–4, 6, 10–11, 13
Team Rocker by Gallina	Yamaha	Yamaha TZ 250	43; 49; 47; 42	(Italy) Fausto Ricci	4–8, 11–13
Tecno Racing/Barrca March	Aprilia	Aprilia RSV 250	44; 43; 42	(Spain) Jaime Mariano	1–7
RS Rallye Sport GmbH	Aprilia	Aprilia RSV 250	44; 41; 54; 45	(Germany) Bernd Kassner	5–7, 9–14
Rothmans Honda Italy	Honda	Honda RS250R	45; 41; 48; 50; 57; 59	(Italy) Corrado Catalano	All
Swiss Yamaha Team	Yamaha	Yamaha TZ 250	47; 46; 48; 44; 40	(Switzerland) Urs Jücker	All
Trans Freight Europa	Yamaha	Yamaha TZ 250	48; 53; 40; 50; 38	(United Kingdom) Ian Newton	2–10, 12–15
Rothmans Honda France	Honda	Honda RS250R	51	(France) Jean-Pierre Jeandat	All
Nescafé Yamaha Racing Team	Yamaha	Yamaha YZR 250	52	(Japan) Tetsuya Harada	1
??	Honda	Honda NSR250	53	(Japan) Masumitsu Taguchi	1
Racing Team Udagawa	Honda	Honda NSR250	54	(Japan) Tsutomu Udagawa	1
Cup Noodle Racing Team	Honda	Honda NSR250	55	(Japan) Nobuatsu Aoki	1
Jha Racing	Honda	Honda RS250R	57; 40; 52	(Japan) Katsuyoshi Kozono	1, 7–9, 15
Team Italia	Aprilia	Aprilia RSV 250	60; 58; 46	(Italy) Max Biaggi	8, 10–12
??	Yamaha	Yamaha YZR 250	61	(Japan) Kyoji Nanba	1
AMS Mauri Racing	Aprilia	Aprilia RSV 250	65; 50; 38; 42; 54; 37	(Finland) Erkka Korpiaho	4–5, 7–11, 13–14
Tecno Racing	Aprilia	Aprilia RSV 250	72; 56	(Spain) Herri Torrontégui	9–14

Key
Regular Rider
Wildcard Rider
Replacement Rider

=== 125cc participants ===
Team	Constructor	Motorcycle	No.	Rider	Rounds
AGV-Pileri Corse	Honda	Honda RS125R	1	(Italy) Loris Capirossi	1–2, 4–13, 15
AGV-Pileri Corse	Honda	Honda RS125R	7	(Italy) Fausto Gresini	1–2, 4–13, 15
Sharp Samson Racing Team	Honda	Honda RS125R	2	(Netherlands) Hans Spaan	1–2, 4–13, 15
Sharp Samson Racing Team	Honda	Honda RS125R	46	(Netherlands) Arie Molenaar	1, 4–13, 15
Team Semprucci IDM	Honda	Honda RS125R	3	(Italy) Bruno Casanova	1–2, 4–13, 15
Schuh HB Honda Racing Team	Honda	Honda RS125R	4	(Germany) Dirk Raudies	1–2, 4–13, 15
Elf Coronas Racing Team	JJ Cobas-Honda	JJ Cobas Honda RS125R	5	(Spain) Jorge Martínez	1–2, 4–13, 15
Elf Coronas Racing Team	JJ Cobas-Honda	JJ Cobas Honda RS125R	14	(Spain) Julián Miralles	1, 4–13
Elf Coronas Racing Team	JJ Cobas-Honda	JJ Cobas Honda RS125R	?	(Spain) Jaime Mariano	8–9
Metraux	Honda	Honda RS125R	5	(Spain) Jorge Martínez	1–2, 4–13, 15
Derbi Racing Team	Derbi	Aprilia RS125R	6	(Italy) Ezio Gianola	1–2, 4–12
Derbi Racing Team	Derbi	Aprilia RS125R	66; 62	(Spain) Luis Alvaro	4–11, 13
Team Italia	Aprilia	Aprilia RS125R	9	(Italy) Alessandro Gramigni	1–2, 4–13
Team Italia	Aprilia	Aprilia RS125R	12	(Italy) Gabriele Debbia	1–2, 4–13, 15
RS Rallye Sport GmbH	JJ Cobas	??	11	(Germany) Adi Stadler	1–2, 4–13, 15
Gazzaniga Corse	Gazzaniga	Gazzaniga 125	15	(Italy) Maurizio Vitali	1–2, 4–13, 15
Gazzaniga Corse	Gazzaniga	Gazzaniga 125	34	(Italy) Emilio Cuppini	1–2, 4–7, 9, 11–13, 15
Team Takeshima	Honda	Honda RS125R	16	(Japan) Koji Takada	1–2, 4–5, 9–13, 15
Derek Clarke Racing Team/Levior	Honda	Honda RS125R	17	(United Kingdom) Steve Patrickson	1–2, 4–5, 7–9, 11–13
Colin Appleyard Racing	Honda	Honda RS125R	18	(United Kingdom) Robin Appleyard	1–2, 4, 6, 8, 10–11, 15
??	Honda	Honda RS125R	19	(Germany) Alfred Waibel	1–2, 4–7, 9–10, 13
Team Unemoto	Honda	Honda RS125R	20	(Japan) Hisashi Unemoto	1–2, 4–8, 10–13, 15
AGV Racing Team	Rotax	Rotax 125 GP	22	(Germany) Peter Öttl	4–13
AGV/MDS Racing Team	Rotax	Rotax 125 GP	63; 57	(Germany) Stefan Kurfiss	6, 8–13
JJ Cobas Ducados-Agrati	Honda	Honda RS125R	26	(Spain) Francisco Debón	2, 4–6
HB Italy/Gilera Club	Honda	Honda RS125R	27	(Italy) Gimmi Bosio	1–2, 4–8, 10, 13
Schuh/Zwafink Honda Racing	Honda	Honda RS125R	28	(Germany) Ralf Waldmann	1–2, 4–13
Team Driza Bone	Honda	Honda RS125R	29	(Australia) Peter Galvin	1–2, 4, 7–12, 15
Team Elf Kepla/Meiko	Honda	Honda RS125R	35	(Japan) Kazuto Sakata	1–2, 4–13, 15
Clay Cross Motorcycles	Honda	Honda RS125R	36; 45; 62	(United Kingdom) Ian McConnachie	4–9, 11, 13
Silja Line Racing Team	Honda	Honda RS125R	39; 51; 40	(Finland) Johnny Wickström	1–2, 5–13
Ville de Thiers	Honda	Honda RS125R	41	(France) Alain Bronec	4–5, 7–13
Herri Racing Team	JJ Cobas	??	42	(Spain) Herri Torrontegui	1–2, 4–8
Herri Racing Team	JJ Cobas	??	44; 40	(Spain) Javier Torrontegui	??
Racing Team Honda Cartagena	Honda	Honda RS125R	43	(France) Manuel Hernández	4–5, 8, 10–11
BP Racing Team Switzerland	Honda	Honda RS125R	45	(Switzerland) Thierry Feuz	1–2, 4–8
Marlboro Aprilia Mohag	Aprilia	Aprilia RS125R	45; 48; 76	(Switzerland) Oliver Petrucciani	1–2, 7–13, 15
Dianetik Racing Team	Honda	Honda RS125R	49	(Switzerland) René Dünki	2, 6, 12–13
Moto Co Team Kepla	Honda	Honda RS125R	50	(Germany) Hubert Abold	1–2
Team Ducados	JJ Cobas	??	50; 61; 75	(Spain) Antonio Sánchez	10-12
Team Ducados	JJ Cobas	??	53; 60; 76	(Spain) Carlos Giró Jr.	10–11
Moto Bum Racing Team	Honda	Honda RS125R	51; 52; 61; 36; 39	(Japan) Nobuyuki Wakai	1, 4–13, 15
??	Honda	Honda RS125R	53	(Japan) Akira Saito	1
??	Honda	Honda RS125R	54	(Japan) Soichiro Satoh	1
??	Honda	Honda RS125R	55	(Japan) Masato Shima	1
Ringleberg Team	Honda	Honda RS125R	55; 52; 71	(Netherlands) Jos Van Dongen	4, 6–7, 9–13
Hero Sports TS	Honda	Honda RS125R	56; 60; 36; 30; 37	(Japan) Noboru Ueda	1–2, 4–5, 7–13, 15
ICM Racing Associates	Honda	Honda RS125R	58; 73; 60; 33; 43	(Japan) Kinya Wada	1–2, 5–13, 15
Eugenio Lazzarini Racing	Honda	Honda RS125R	61; 38	(Italy) Serafino Foti	5, 7, 9, 11–13, 15
Team Brägger	Honda	Honda RS125R	62	(Switzerland) Stefan Brägger	6, 8, 10, 13

Key
Regular Rider
Wildcard Rider
Replacement Rider

== Results and standings ==
=== 500cc riders' standings ===
Scoring system

Points are awarded to the top fifteen finishers. A rider has to finish the race to earn points.

Position	**1st**	**2nd**	**3rd**	**4th**	**5th**	**6th**	**7th**	**8th**	**9th**	**10th**	**11th**	**12th**	**13th**	**14th**	**15th**
Points	20	17	15	13	11	10	9	8	7	6	5	4	3	2	1

Pos	Rider	Bike	JPN (Japan)	AUS (Australia)	USA (United States)	ESP (Spain)	ITA (Italy)	GER (Germany)	AUT (Austria)	EUR (Europe)	NED (Netherlands)	FRA (France)	GBR (United Kingdom)	RSM (San Marino)	TCH (Czech Republic)	VDM (Pays de la Loire)	MAL (Malaysia)	Pts
1	(United States) Wayne Rainey	Yamaha	3	**1**	**1**	**3**	**9**	2	2	1	2	**1**	2	1	**1**	3		233
2	(Australia) Mick Doohan	Honda	2	2	2	1	1	**3**	**1**	2	Ret	2	3	3	2	2	3	224
3	(United States) Kevin Schwantz	Suzuki	**1**	5	3	Ret	7	1	3	**4**	**1**	4	**1**	**2**	5	1		204
4	(United States) John Kocinski	Yamaha	4	3	Ret	2	2	Ret	9	5	6	DNS	4	6	3	**4**	**1**	161
5	(Australia) Wayne Gardner	Honda	5	4	7	7		5	4	3	3	10	5	4	4	5	2	161
6	(United States) Eddie Lawson	Cagiva	6	6	5	6	3	4	5	Ret	4	3	6	Ret	8			126
7	(Spain) Juan Garriga	Yamaha	7	Ret	8	4	8	7	6	6	12	11	9	7	6	6	4	121
8	(Belgium) Didier de Radiguès	Suzuki	14	10	10	8	Ret	6	8	10	5	7	8	8	7	8	8	105
9	(United States) Doug Chandler	Yamaha	11	12	Ret	10	6	9	7	9	11	6	Ret	9	10	7	Ret	85
10	(France) Jean-Philippe Ruggia	Yamaha	Ret	7	4	5	5			7	8	5	Ret	10	Ret	Ret	Ret	78
11	(France) Adrien Morillas	Yamaha	12	9	9	9	Ret	8	Ret	8	9	8	Ret	Ret	Ret	10	7	71
12	(Republic of Ireland) Eddie Laycock	Yamaha	Ret	13	13	11	10	10	10	12	Ret		11	11	11	11	12	57
13	(Brazil) Alex Barros	Cagiva	10	8	6		4				7							46
14	(Spain) Sito Pons	Honda	8	Ret	Ret					11	10	9	Ret	Ret	9	9	Ret	40
15	(Netherlands) Cees Doorakkers	Honda	22	14	14	13	12	11		13	13	12	14	13	13	Ret	10	40
16	(Italy) Marco Papa	Honda				12	11		12	Ret		13	10	12		13	9	36
17	(United Kingdom) Niall Mackenzie	Yamaha											7	5		12	6	34
18	(Germany) Michael Rudroff	Honda				15	15	12	11	14	14	14	13	14	12	Ret		26
19	(Australia) Kevin Magee	Suzuki	13	11													5	19
20	(Germany) Harald Becker	Yamaha				14	Ret	13		16	Ret	Ret	Ret	15	14	Ret	11	13
21	(Japan) Keiichiro Iwahashi	Honda	9															7
22	(United Kingdom) Simon Buckmaster	Suzuki					14	14		Ret	Ret				15	15		6
23	(United States) Rich Oliver	Yamaha			11													5
24	(Switzerland) Niggi Schmassman	Honda		16	15	Ret	Ret			15	15	Ret	Ret		17		14	5
25	(United Kingdom) Ron Haslam	Norton											12					4
26	(United States) Robbie Petersen	Yamaha			12													4
27	(Austria) Josef Doppler	Yamaha								17		15	17	16	16		13	4
28	(Italy) Romolo Balbi	Honda					13							17				3
29	(Luxembourg) Andreas Leuthe	Suzuki								Ret			15	18	Ret	14		3
30	(United Kingdom) Steve Spray	Norton		15														1
31	(Australia) Peter Goddard	Yamaha	15															1
Pos	Rider	Bike	JPN (Japan)	AUS (Australia)	USA (United States)	ESP (Spain)	ITA (Italy)	GER (Germany)	AUT (Austria)	EUR (Europe)	NED (Netherlands)	FRA (France)	GBR (United Kingdom)	RSM (San Marino)	TCH (Czech Republic)	VDM (Europe)	MAL (Malaysia)	Pts

Colour	Result
Gold	Winner
Silver	Second place
Bronze	Third place
Green	Points classification
Blue	Non-points classification
Blue	Non-classified finish (NC)
Purple	Retired, not classified (Ret)
Red	Did not qualify (DNQ)
Red	Did not pre-qualify (DNPQ)
Black	Disqualified (DSQ)
White	Did not start (DNS)
White	Withdrew (WD)
White	Race cancelled (C)
Blank	Did not practice (DNP)
Blank	Did not arrive (DNA)
Blank	Excluded (EX)

**Bold** – Pole Position

=== 250cc riders' standings ===
Scoring system

Points are awarded to the top fifteen finishers. A rider has to finish the race to earn points.

Position	**1st**	**2nd**	**3rd**	**4th**	**5th**	**6th**	**7th**	**8th**	**9th**	**10th**	**11th**	**12th**	**13th**	**14th**	**15th**
Points	20	17	15	13	11	10	9	8	7	6	5	4	3	2	1

Pos	Rider	Bike	JPN (Japan)	AUS (Australia)	USA (United States)	ESP (Spain)	ITA (Italy)	GER (Germany)	AUT (Austria)	EUR (Europe)	NED (Netherlands)	Points	Wins
1	(Italy) Luca Cadalora	Honda	1	**1**	**1**	2	1	4	5	1	2	237	5
2	(Germany) Helmut Bradl	Honda	7	2	8	**1**	**2**	**1**	**1**	2	4	220	3
3	(Spain) Carlos Cardús	Honda	2	3	4	6	6	2	2	3	5	205	0
4	(Netherlands) Wilco Zeelenberg	Honda	**3**	4	2	Ret	5	3	3	4	3	158	0
5	(Japan) Masahiro Shimizu	Honda	8	Ret	5	4	7	5	6	6	6	142	0
6	(Italy) Loris Reggiani	Aprilia	9	5	3	3	4	Ret	8	5	Ret	128	0
7	(Italy) Pierfrancesco Chili	Aprilia	17	6	Ret	5	3	Ret	4	Ret	**1**	107	1
8	(Germany) Jochen Schmid	Honda	13	8	10	7	8	8	7	8	Ret	96	0
9	(Germany) Martin Wimmer	Suzuki	14	Ret	7	8	19	9	13	9	7	89	0
10	(Italy) Paolo Casoli	Yamaha	26	9	Ret	Ret	10	11	11	10	8	65	0
11	(Austria) Andy Preining	Aprilia	19	7	6	Ret	9	6	Ret	14	20	60	
12	(France) Jean Pierre Jeandat	Honda	18	11	11	12	11	14	Ret	13	10	59	
13	(Spain) Àlex Crivillé	Honda	Ret	Ret	9	Ret	Ret	7	9	Ret	Ret	51	
14	(Venezuela) Carlos Lavado	Yamaha	25	10	12	11	14	15	DNS		9	34	
15	(Italy) Doriano Romboni	Honda	Ret	Ret	13	9	Ret	13	Ret	7	Ret	32	
16	(Spain) Alberto Puig	Yamaha	21	Ret	Ret	10	Ret	DNS		DNS	Ret	28	
17	(Germany) Stefan Prein	Honda	20	Ret	15	DNS	15	10	10	Ret	Ret	28	
18	(Germany) Harald Eckl	Aprilia		Ret	14	Ret	16	12	12	19	11	22	
19	(Japan) Katsuyoshi Kozono	Honda	11						21	11	12	20	
20	(Italy) Renzo Colleoni	Aprilia				Ret	13	Ret	25	Ret	Ret	19	
21	(Switzerland) Bernard Haenggeli	Aprilia	32	12	17	17	Ret	Ret	22	Ret	13	15	
22	(Japan) Masumitsu Taguchi	Honda	4									13	
23	(Japan) Nobuatsu Aoki	Honda	5									13	
24	(Japan) Tetsuya Harada	Yamaha	6									10	
25	(Spain) Herri Torrontegui	Aprilia									Ret	8	
26	(Finland) Erkka Korpiaho	Aprilia				Ret	12	DNS	14	17	Ret	8	
27	(Italy) Max Biaggi	Aprilia								Ret		7	
28	(Japan) Tsutomu Udagawa	Honda	10									6	
29	(Italy) Marcellino Lucchi	Aprilia				Ret	Ret	22	Ret	Ret	14	5	
30	Jose Barresi											4	
30	(Japan) Kyoji Nanba	Yamaha	12									4	
30	(France) Dominique Sarron	Yamaha				Ret		16		12		4	
33	(France) Frederic Protat	Aprilia	30	13	Ret	Ret	Ret	DNS	Ret	15	17	4	
34	(Switzerland) Urs Jücker	Yamaha	27	14	18	15	18	Ret	Ret	18	16	4	
35	(Netherlands) Leon Van Der Heyden	Honda	23	Ret	19	13	Ret	DNS		22	Ret	3	
35	(Netherlands) Patrick van den Goorbergh	Yamaha				14	21	19	23	20	15	3	
37	(Netherlands) Jurgen van den Goorbergh											2	
38	(Italy) Corrado Catalano	Honda	Ret	Ret	24	Ret	Ret	Ret	15	Ret	Ret	1	
38	(Germany) Bernd Kassner	Honda					22	17	20		21	1	
38	(Japan) Toshi Arakaki	Honda	15									1	
38	(United Kingdom) Kevin Mitchell	Yamaha	29	15	Ret	Ret		20	DNS			1	
	(Spain) Jaime Mariano	Aprilia	Ret	17	20	16	17	Ret	18			0	
	(Italy) Fausto Ricci	Yamaha				19	Ret	18	16	Ret	DNQ	0	
	(Italy) Stefano Pennese	Aprilia					Ret	DNS	19	16	Ret	0	
	(United States) Jim Filice	Yamaha	31	Ret	16							0	
	(Japan) Osamu Miyazaki	Yamaha	16									0	
	(Australia) Stephen Whitehouse	Yamaha		16								0	
	(Switzerland) Eskil Suter	Aprilia							17	23		0	
	(United Kingdom) Ian Newton	Yamaha		Ret	27	18	Ret	24	26	21	19	0	
	(France) Jean Foray	Yamaha				20	24	21	27	Ret	18	0	
	(Australia) David Horton	Yamaha		18								0	
	(Australia) Gavin Johnston	Yamaha		19								0	
	(Italy) Renato Colleoni	Aprilia					20		24			0	
	(Australia) Warren Palesy	Yamaha		20								0	
	(Australia) Michael Haisman	Yamaha		21								0	
	(United States) Nick Ienatsch	Yamaha			21							0	
	(Sweden) Peter Linden	Honda	28	Ret				25	Ret		22	0	
	(Japan) Takehiko Kurokawa	Honda	22									0	
	(New Zealand) Scott Buckley	Yamaha		22								0	
	(United States) Chris D'Aluisio	Yamaha			22							0	
	(South Africa) Wayne Doran	Aprilia					23	23	28			0	
	(Canada) Jon Cornwell	Yamaha			25						23	0	
	(United States) Rick Kirk	Yamaha			23							0	
	(Japan) Yoshiaki Kato	Yamaha	24									0	
	(United States) Mike Sullivan	Yamaha			26							0	
	(Japan) Hiroyuki Yamagishi	Honda	Ret									0	
	(Australia) Darren Milner	Yamaha		Ret								0	
	(Australia) Trevor Manley	Yamaha		Ret								0	
	(Australia) Ricky Rice	Yamaha		Ret								0	
	(United States) Alan Scott	Yamaha			Ret							0	
	(Canada) Rick Tripodi	Yamaha			Ret							0	
	(Spain) Daniel Amatriain	Aprilia								Ret		0	
	(Italy) Stefano Caracchi	Yamaha									DNQ	0	

=== 125cc standings ===
Place	Rider	Number	Country	Machine	Points	Wins
1	(Italy) Loris Capirossi	1	Italy	Honda	200	5
2	(Italy) Fausto Gresini	8	Italy	Honda	181	2
3	(West Germany) Ralf Waldmann	28	Germany	Honda	141	2
4	(Italy) Gabriele Debbia	12	Italy	Aprilia	111	0
5	(Japan) Noboru Ueda	56	Japan	Honda	105	2
6	(Spain) Jorge Martínez	6	Spain	Cobas	99	0
7	(Italy) Alessandro Gramigni	9	Italy	Aprilia	90	1
8	(Germany) Dirk Raudies	5	Germany	Honda	81	0
9	(Germany) Peter Öttl	22	Germany	Rotax	67	1
10	(Japan) Nobuyuki Wakai	51	Japan	Honda	60	0
11	(Switzerland) Heinz Lüthi	10	Switzerland	Honda	56	0
12	(Germany) Adi Stadler	11	Germany	Cobas	56	0
13	(Japan) Kazuto Sakata	35	Japan	Honda	55	0
14	(Netherlands) Hans Spaan	2	Netherlands	Honda	54	0
15	(Italy) Bruno Casanova	3	Italy	Honda	45	0
16	(Italy) Ezio Gianola	6	Italy	Derbi	32	0
17	(Japan) Koji Takada	16	Japan	Honda	28	0
18	(Italy) Maurizio Vitali	15	Italy	Gazzaniga	27	0
19	(Japan) Hisashi Unemoto		Japan	Honda	15	0
20	(Japan) Kinya Wada	73	Japan	Honda	14	0
21	(Japan) Masato Shima		Japan	Honda	13	0
22	(Spain) Luis Alvaro	66	Spain	Derbi	13	0
23	(Switzerland) Oliver Petrucciani	47	Switzerland	Aprilia	13	0
24	(Spain) Herri Torrontegui		Spain	Cobas	12	0
25	(Spain) Andres Sanchez		Spain	Cobas	12	0
26	(Italy) Gimmi Bosio		Italy	Honda	12	0
27	(Spain) Julián Miralles	14	Spain	Cobas	10	0
28	(Germany) Alfred Waibel	19	Germany	Honda	9	0
29	(Japan) Akira Saito		Japan	Honda	8	0
30	(Japan) Sinya Sato		Japan	Honda	7	0
31	(Spain) Carlos Giro Jr.		Spain	Cobas	7	0
32	(Netherlands) Arie Molenaar	46	Netherlands	Honda	7	0
33	(Spain) Manuel Herreros		Spain	Cobas	6	0
34	(United Kingdom) Ian McConnachie	62	United Kingdom	Kawasaki	5	0
35	(United Kingdom) Steve Patrickson		United Kingdom	Honda	5	0
36	(Finland) Johnny Wickstroem		Finland	Cobas	5	0
37	(Japan) Yosuke Yamakawa		Japan	Honda	3	0
38	(Australia) Peter Galvin	29	Australia	Honda	2	0
39	(France) Alain Bronec	41	France	Honda	2	0
