= 1991 Austrian motorcycle Grand Prix =

(Austria) 1991 Austrian Grand Prix
Race details
- Race 7 of 15 races in the 1991 Grand Prix motorcycle racing season
- Date: 9 June 1991
- Official name: Großer Preis von Österreich
- Location: Salzburgring
- Course: Permanent racing facility; 4.243 km (2.636 mi)

500cc
Pole position
Rider	(Australia) Mick Doohan	Honda
Time	1:17.826	
Fastest lap
Rider	(United States) Wayne Rainey	Yamaha
Time	1:18.085	
Podium
First	(Australia) Mick Doohan	Honda
Second	(United States) Wayne Rainey	Yamaha
Third	(United States) Kevin Schwantz	Suzuki

250cc
Pole position
Rider	(Germany) Helmut Bradl	Honda
Time	1:22.948	
Fastest lap
Rider	(Spain) Carlos Cardús	Honda
Time	1:22.631	
Podium
First	(Germany) Helmut Bradl	Honda
Second	(Spain) Carlos Cardús	Honda
Third	(Netherlands) Wilco Zeelenberg	Honda

125cc
Pole position
Rider	(Germany) Ralf Waldmann	Honda
Time	1:31.417	
Fastest lap
Rider	(Spain) Jorge Martínez	Honda
Time	1:30.874	
Podium
First	(Italy) Fausto Gresini	Honda
Second	(Germany) Ralf Waldmann	Honda
Third	(Japan) Noboru Ueda	Honda

Sidecar (B2A)
Pole position
Rider	(United Kingdom) Steve Webster	Krauser
Passenger	(United Kingdom) Gavin Simmons	
Time	1:24.823	
Fastest lap
Rider	(Germany) Ralph Bohnhorst	Bohnhorst
Passenger	(Germany) Bruno Hiller	
Time	1:25.149	
Podium
First rider	(United Kingdom) Steve Webster	Krauser
First passenger	(United Kingdom) Gavin Simmons	
Second rider	(Switzerland) Rolf Biland	LCR-ADM
Second passenger	(Switzerland) Kurt Waltisperg	
Third rider	(Japan) Masato Kumano	LCR-Yamaha
Third passenger	(Germany) Eckhart Rösinger	

The 1991 Austrian motorcycle Grand Prix was the seventh round of the 1991 Grand Prix motorcycle racing season. It took place on the weekend of 7–9 June 1991 at the Salzburgring.

== 500 cc race report ==
Mick Doohan dominates qualifying with more than a second under Kevin Schwantz in 2nd place.

At the start, Wayne Rainey gets the first turn from Wayne Gardner, Doohan and John Kocinski. Doohan gets past Gardner and he and Rainey start forming a gap at the front. Kocinski starts putting pressure on Gardner.

Doohan takes the lead, with Rainey doing everything he can to stay in contact. Schwantz starts moving through the field. It ends in that order.

Schwantz complains that with two laps to go, Gardner almost pushed him into a barrier, and there are heated words after the race.

== 500 cc classification ==
Pos.	Rider	Team	Manufacturer	Laps	Time	Grid	Points
1	(Australia) Mick Doohan	Rothmans Honda Team	Honda	29	38:03.841	1	20
2	(United States) Wayne Rainey	Marlboro Team Roberts	Yamaha	29	+0.185	3	17
3	(United States) Kevin Schwantz	Lucky Strike Suzuki	Suzuki	29	+15.625	2	15
4	(Australia) Wayne Gardner	Rothmans Honda Team	Honda	29	+15.827	4	13
5	(United States) Eddie Lawson	Cagiva Corse	Cagiva	29	+38.688	6	11
6	(Spain) Juan Garriga	Ducados Yamaha	Yamaha	29	+59.489	8	10
7	(United States) Doug Chandler	Roberts B Team	Yamaha	29	+1:13.608	9	9
8	(Belgium) Didier de Radiguès	Lucky Strike Suzuki	Suzuki	28	+1 lap	7	8
9	(United States) John Kocinski	Marlboro Team Roberts	Yamaha	28	+1 lap	5	7
10	(Republic of Ireland) Eddie Laycock	Millar Racing	Yamaha	28	+1 lap	11	6
11	(Germany) Michael Rudroff	Rallye Sport	Honda	27	+2 laps	13	5
12	(Italy) Marco Papa	Cagiva Corse	Cagiva	27	+2 laps	12	4
Ret	(France) Adrien Morillas	Sonauto Yamaha Mobil 1	Yamaha	4	Retired	10	
DNQ	(Netherlands) Cees Doorakkers	HEK-Baumachines	Honda		Did not qualify		
DNQ	(Austria) Sepp Doppler	Doppler Racing	Yamaha		Did not qualify		
DNQ	(Germany) Hans Becker	Team Romero Racing	Yamaha		Did not qualify		
DNQ	(Germany) Helmut Schutz	Rallye Sport	Honda		Did not qualify		
DNQ	(Luxembourg) Andreas Leuthe	Librenti Corse	Suzuki		Did not qualify		
DNQ	(Switzerland) Nicolas Schmassman	Schmassman Technotron	Honda		Did not qualify		
DNQ	(Germany) Martin Trösch	MT Racing	Honda		Did not qualify		

== 250 cc classification ==
Pos	Rider	Manufacturer	Laps	Time	Grid	Points
1	(Germany) Helmut Bradl	Honda	24	33:23.857	1	20
2	(Spain) Carlos Cardús	Honda	24	+7.818	3	17
3	(Netherlands) Wilco Zeelenberg	Honda	24	+8.157	5	15
4	(Italy) Pierfrancesco Chili	Aprilia	24	+9.054	2	13
5	(Italy) Luca Cadalora	Honda	24	+18.878	7	11
6	(Japan) Masahiro Shimizu	Honda	24	+32.197	9	10
7	(Germany) Jochen Schmid	Honda	24	+36.707	10	9
8	(Italy) Loris Reggiani	Aprilia	24	+48.198	6	8
9	(Spain) Àlex Crivillé	JJ Cobas	24	+1:03.281	8	7
10	(Germany) Stefan Prein	Honda	24	+1:03.387	14	6
11	(Italy) Paolo Casoli	Yamaha	24	+1:08.090	11	5
12	(Germany) Harald Eckl	Aprilia	24	+1:20.874		4
13	(Germany) Martin Wimmer	Suzuki	24	+1:21.043	12	3
14	(Finland) Erkka Korpiaho	Aprilia	24	+1:21.234		2
15	(Italy) Corrado Catalano	Honda	24	+1:22.801		1
16	(Italy) Fausto Ricci	Yamaha	24	+1:23.529		
17	(Switzerland) Eskil Suter	Aprilia	24	+1:40.552		
18	(Spain) Jaime Mariano	Aprilia	23	+1 lap		
19	(Italy) Stefano Pennese	Aprilia	23	+1 lap		
20	(Germany) Bernd Kassner	Yamaha	23	+1 lap		
21	(Japan) Katsuyoshi Kozono	Honda	23	+1 lap		
22	(Switzerland) Bernard Hänggeli	Aprilia	23	+1 lap		
23	(Netherlands) Patrick van der Goorbergh	Yamaha	23	+1 lap		
24	(Italy) Renato Colleoni	Aprilia	23	+1 lap		
25	(Italy) Renzo Colleoni	Aprilia	23	+1 lap		
26	(United Kingdom) Ian Newton	Yamaha	23	+1 lap		
27	(France) Jean Foray	Yamaha	23	+1 lap		
28	(South Africa) Wayne Doran	Yamaha	23	+1 lap		
Ret	(Switzerland) Urs Jucker	Yamaha	23	Retired		
Ret	(Austria) Andreas Preining	Aprilia	18	Retired	4	
Ret	(France) Jean-Pierre Jeandat	Honda	10	Retired		
Ret	(Sweden) Peter Linden	Honda	8	Retired		
Ret	(Italy) Doriano Romboni	Honda	5	Retired	13	
Ret	(France) Frédéric Protat	Aprilia	4	Retired		
Ret	(Italy) Marcellino Lucchi	Aprilia	2	Retired	15	
DNS	(Venezuela) Carlos Lavado	Yamaha				
DNS	(United Kingdom) Kevin Mitchell	Yamaha				

== 125 cc classification ==
Pos	Rider	Manufacturer	Laps	Time	Grid	Points
1	(Italy) Fausto Gresini	Honda	22	33:47.096	5	20
2	(Germany) Ralf Waldmann	Honda	22	+0.048	1	17
3	(Japan) Noboru Ueda	Honda	22	+0.452	6	15
4	(Germany) Dirk Raudies	Honda	22	+1.427	7	13
5	(Netherlands) Hans Spaan	Honda	22	+1.580	9	11
6	(Italy) Loris Capirossi	Honda	22	+3.609	2	10
7	(Spain) Jorge Martínez	Honda	22	+3.800		9
8	(Germany) Adolf Stadler	JJ Cobas	22	+3.834	8	8
9	(Switzerland) Heinz Lüthi	Honda	22	+4.287	4	7
10	(Germany) Peter Öttl	Rotax	22	+7.017	11	6
11	(Italy) Alessandro Gramigni	Aprilia	22	+29.176	10	5
12	(Japan) Nobuyuki Wakai	Honda	22	+29.231		4
13	(Switzerland) Olivier Petrucciani	Aprilia	22	+29.288		3
14	(Italy) Maurizio Vitali	Gazzaniga	22	+29.538		2
15	(France) Alain Bronec	Honda	22	+29.620		1
16	(Spain) Julián Miralles	JJ Cobas	22	+30.405		
17	(Italy) Gimmi Bosio	Honda	22	+30.532		
18	(Spain) Herri Torrontegui	JJ Cobas	22	+30.597		
19	(Japan) Hisashi Unemoto	Honda	22	+30.747		
20	(Spain) Luis Alvaro	Derbi	22	+30.797		
21	(Italy) Gabriele Debbia	Aprilia	22	+30.993	3	
22	(Italy) Ezio Gianola	Derbi	22	+51.228	13	
23	(Australia) Peter Galvin	Honda	22	+53.468		
24	(United Kingdom) Ian McConnachie	Honda	22	+53.568		
25	(Finland) Johnny Wickström	Honda	22	+53.896		
26	(Germany) Alfred Waibel	Honda	22	+54.289	15	
27	(United Kingdom) Steve Patrickson	Honda	22	+54.489		
28	(Netherlands) Jos van Dongen	Honda	22	+56.592		
29	(Germany) Wolfgang Fritz	Honda	22	+1:33.788		
30	(Japan) Kinya Wada	Honda	21	+1 lap		
31	(Italy) Emilio Cuppini	Gazzaniga	18	+4 laps		
Ret	(Switzerland) Thierry Feuz	Honda	21	Retired		
Ret	(Italy) Bruno Casanova	Honda	14	Retired	12	
Ret	(Italy) Serafino Foti	Honda	12	Retired		
Ret	(Netherlands) Arie Molenaar	Honda	10	Retired		
Ret	(Japan) Kazuto Sakata	Honda	9	Retired	14	
DNQ	(Germany) Stefan Kurfiss	Honda				
DNQ	(Spain) Manuel Hernández	Honda				
DNQ	(United Kingdom) Robin Appleyard	Honda				
DNQ	(Netherlands) Hans Koopman	Honda				
DNQ	(Socialist Federal Republic of Yugoslavia) Janez Pintar	Honda				
DNQ	(Switzerland) Stefan Brägger	Honda				
DNQ	(United Kingdom) Alan Patterson	Honda				
DNQ	(Switzerland) René Dünki	Honda				
DNQ	(Germany) Hubert Abold	Honda				
DNQ	(Finland) Taru Rinne	Honda				
DNQ	(France) Jean-Claude Selini	Honda				

== Sidecar classification ==
Pos	Rider	Passenger	Manufacturer	Laps	Time/Retired	Grid	Points
1	(United Kingdom) Steve Webster	(United Kingdom) Gavin Simmons	Krauser	22	31:43.039	1	20
2	(Switzerland) Rolf Biland	(Switzerland) Kurt Waltisperg	LCR-ADM	22	+15.773	3	17
3	(Japan) Masato Kumano	(Germany) Eckhart Rösinger	LCR-Yamaha	22	+16.174		15
4	(Austria) Klaus Klaffenböck	(Austria) Christian Parzer	LCR	22	+16.511	9	13
5	(Switzerland) Paul Güdel	(Switzerland) Charly Güdel	LCR-Krauser	22	+16.735	5	11
6	(United Kingdom) Steve Abbott	(United Kingdom) Shaun Smith	LCR-Krauser	22	+17.141		10
7	(Germany) Ralph Bohnhorst	(Germany) Bruno Hiller	Bohnhorst	22	+18.107	11	9
8	(Netherlands) Egbert Streuer	(United Kingdom) Peter Essaff	LCR-Yamaha	22	+30.693	10	8
9	(United Kingdom) Derek Brindley	(United Kingdom) Nick Roche	LCR	22	+50.156		7
10	(Netherlands) Theo van Kempen	(Netherlands) Jan Kuyt	LCR-Krauser	22	+51.465	13	6
11	(Switzerland) René Progin	(United Kingdom) Gary Irlam	LCR	22	+51.594	12	5
12	(Germany) Werner Kraus	(Germany) Thomas Schröder	ADM	22	+53.107		4
13	(Switzerland) Markus Bösiger	(Switzerland) Peter Markwalder	LCR-ADM	22	+57.867		3
14	(United Kingdom) Gary Thomas	(Netherlands) Michel van Puyvelde	Krauser	22	+59.430		2
15	(United Kingdom) Darren Dixon	(United Kingdom) Sean Dixon	LCR-Krauser	22	+1:27.816	15	1
16	(Switzerland) Markus Egloff	(Switzerland) Urs Egloff	Yamaha	22	+1:30.638	4	
17	(Netherlands) Jos van Stekelenburg	(Netherlands) Rinie Bettgens	LCR	21	+1 lap		
Ret	(United Kingdom) Barry Smith	(United Kingdom) David Smith	Windle-ADM	10	Retired		
Ret	(Japan) Yoshisada Kumagaya	(United Kingdom) Bryan Houghton	Krauser	8	Retired	7	
Ret	(Switzerland) Tony Wyssen	(Switzerland) Killian Wyssen	LCR-Krauser	7	Retired	6	
Ret	(United Kingdom) Tony Baker	(United Kingdom) Simon Prior	LCR-Krauser	4	Retired		
Ret	(France) Alain Michel	(United Kingdom) Simon Birchall	Krauser	0	Retired	2	
Ret	(Switzerland) Alfred Zurbrügg	(Switzerland) Martin Zurbrügg	LCR-Yamaha	0	Retired	14	
DNS	(United Kingdom) Barry Brindley	(United Kingdom) Trevor Hopkinson	LCR-Yamaha			8	
DNQ	(Switzerland) Hans Hügli	(Switzerland) Adolf Hänni	LCR				
DNQ	(Netherlands) Peter Lemstra	(Netherlands) Guy Scott	LCR				
DNQ	(Sweden) Billy Gällros	(Sweden) Peter Berglund	LCR				
DNQ	(Italy) Reiner Kosta	(Switzerland) Jurg Egli	Yamaha				

Previous race: 1991 German Grand Prix	FIM Grand Prix World Championship; 1991 season	Next race: 1991 European Grand Prix
Previous race: 1990 Austrian Grand Prix	Austrian Grand Prix	Next race: 1993 Austrian Grand Prix
