= 1991 Vitesse du Mans motorcycle Grand Prix =

(Pays de la Loire) 1991 Vitesse du Mans Grand Prix
Race details
- Race 14 of 15 races in the 1991 Grand Prix motorcycle racing season
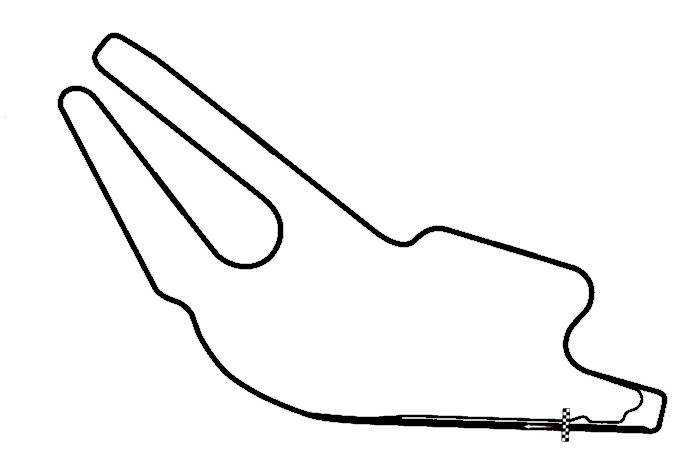
- Date: 8 September 1991
- Official name: Grand Prix Vitesse Du Mans
- Location: Bugatti Circuit
- Course: Permanent racing facility; 4.425 km (2.750 mi)

500cc
Pole position
- Rider: (United States) John Kocinski
- Time: 1:39.964
Fastest lap
- Rider: (Australia) Mick Doohan
- Time: 1:41.200
Podium
- First: (United States) Kevin Schwantz
- Second: (Australia) Mick Doohan
- Third: (United States) Wayne Rainey

250cc
Pole position
- Rider: (Italy) Luca Cadalora
- Time: 1:44.963
Fastest lap
- Rider: (Germany) Helmut Bradl
- Time: 1:45.375
Podium
- First: (Germany) Helmut Bradl
- Second: (Spain) Carlos Cardús
- Third: (Italy) Luca Cadalora

The 1991 Vitesse du Mans motorcycle Grand Prix was a one-off race and the penultimate round of the 1991 Grand Prix motorcycle racing season. It took place on the weekend of 6–8 September 1991 at the Bugatti Circuit located in Le Mans, France.

Originally meant to be held in Brazil, that race was cancelled for safety reasons, so the FIM decided to add a second French round. It is the only time in FIM Grand Prix motorcycle racing history two rounds were held in France during a season. The race's name was used for this race only, after the European Grand Prix moniker had been used for a race in Jarama that replaced the Yugoslavian race.

== 500 cc race report ==
John Kocinski on pole. Kevin Schwantz gets the start from Kocinski, Mick Doohan, Wayne Gardner and Wayne Rainey.

Schwantz and Doohan battle for 1st, but at ten laps to go, Rainey just needs to stay in 3rd place to win the championship.

Rainey speculates that Kocinski let him take 3rd so he could win the championship, though he told team manager Kenny Roberts he didn't want Kocinski's help.

Kenny Roberts: "There were a lot of races where we shouldn't have won, and we really wouldn't have won if it wasn't for Wayne. There's a lot of races where had we had anyone else, it wouldn't have happened. Wayne was very, very determined to win it this year. Some years you can say the bikes were definitely better or our engineering was better, but this year Wayne was definitely better."

== 500cc classification ==
Pos.	Rider	Team	Manufacturer	Time/Retired	Points
1	(United States) Kevin Schwantz	Lucky Strike Suzuki	Suzuki	47:37.764	20
2	(Australia) Mick Doohan	Rothmans Honda Team	Honda	+0.148	17
3	(United States) Wayne Rainey	Marlboro Team Roberts	Yamaha	+3.468	15
4	(United States) John Kocinski	Marlboro Team Roberts	Yamaha	+3.700	13
5	(Australia) Wayne Gardner	Rothmans Honda Team	Honda	+3.966	11
6	(Spain) Juan Garriga	Ducados Yamaha	Yamaha	+37.852	10
7	(United States) Doug Chandler	Roberts B Team	Yamaha	+38.342	9
8	(Belgium) Didier de Radiguès	Lucky Strike Suzuki	Suzuki	+39.290	8
9	(Spain) Sito Pons	Campsa Honda Team	Honda	+1:30.554	7
10	(France) Adrien Morillas	Sonauto Yamaha Mobil 1	Yamaha	+1:45.040	6
11	(Republic of Ireland) Eddie Laycock	Millar Racing	Yamaha	+1 Lap	5
12	(United Kingdom) Niall Mackenzie	Roberts B Team	Yamaha	+1 Lap	4
13	(Italy) Marco Papa	Team Marco Papa	Honda	+2 Laps	3
14	(Luxembourg) Andreas Leuthe	Librenti Corse	Suzuki	+2 Laps	2
15	(United Kingdom) Damon Buckmaster	Padgett's Racing Team	Suzuki	+5 Laps	1
Ret	(Netherlands) Cees Doorakkers	HEK-Baumachines	Honda	Retirement	
Ret	(France) Jean Philippe Ruggia	Sonauto Yamaha Mobil 1	Yamaha	Retirement	
Ret	(Germany) Michael Rudroff	Rallye Sport	Honda	Retirement	
Ret	(Germany) Hans Becker	Team Romero Racing	Yamaha	Retirement	
DNS	(United States) Eddie Lawson	Cagiva Corse	Cagiva	Did not start	
DNQ	(Switzerland) Nicholas Schmassman	Schmassman Technotron	Honda	Did not qualify	
DNQ	(Germany) Helmut Schutz	Rallye Sport	Honda	Did not qualify	
DNQ	(Germany) Martin Trösch	MT Racing	Honda	Did not qualify	
DNQ	(Austria) Josef Doppler	Doppler Racing	Yamaha	Did not qualify	

Previous race: 1991 Czechoslovak Grand Prix	FIM Grand Prix World Championship; 1991 season	Next race: 1991 Malaysian Grand Prix
Previous race: 1990 French Grand Prix	MotoGP at Le Mans	Next race: 1994 French Grand Prix
