= 1991 Dutch TT =

(Netherlands) 1991 Dutch Grand Prix
Race details
- Race 9 of 15 races in the 1991 Grand Prix motorcycle racing season
- Date: 29 June 1991
- Official name: Dutch TT
- Location: TT Circuit Assen
- Course: Permanent racing facility; 6.049 km (3.759 mi)

500cc
Pole position
- Rider: (United States) Kevin Schwantz
- Time: 2:03.437
Fastest lap
- Rider: (United States) Kevin Schwantz
- Time: 2:02.443
Podium
- First: (United States) Kevin Schwantz
- Second: (United States) Wayne Rainey
- Third: (Australia) Wayne Gardner

250cc
Pole position
- Rider: (Italy) Pierfrancesco Chili
- Time: 2:08.295
Fastest lap
- Rider: (Italy) Luca Cadalora
- Time: 2:08.178
Podium
- First: (Italy) Pierfrancesco Chili
- Second: (Italy) Luca Cadalora
- Third: (Netherlands) Wilco Zeelenberg

125cc
Pole position
- Rider: (Italy) Loris Capirossi
- Time: 2:19.646
Fastest lap
- Rider: (Germany) Ralf Waldmann
- Time: 2:19.094
Podium
- First: (Germany) Ralf Waldmann
- Second: (Italy) Loris Capirossi
- Third: (Italy) Alessandro Gramigni

The 1991 Dutch TT was the ninth round of the 1991 Grand Prix motorcycle racing season. It took place on the weekend of 27–29 June 1991 at the TT Circuit Assen located in Assen, Netherlands.

== 500 cc race report ==
Kevin Schwantz on pole, and he gets the start from Wayne Rainey and Mick Doohan. Rain brings out a red flag on lap 4, with Doohan in 1st and Rainey in 5th .85 seconds behind.

Race 2 will be on aggregate time. Rainey gets the first turn from Wayne Gardner and Doohan. Alex Barros bumps Schwantz’ Suzuki with his elbow.

Rainey is opening a gap to Doohan, Gardner, Schwantz and Eddie Lawson. Schwantz and Doohan fight for 2nd and Gardner drops to 4th.

Doohan lowsides out of second and slides into a bale-covered fence, hitting it hard with his upper body. He’s not getting up.

A win would put Rainey ahead of Doohan on points, but Schwantz is closing as they head into the last lap. Schwantz is too far away to pass on the brakes, but at the chicane, Rainey makes a big mistake and goes wide on the exit, having to sit up and ride through the grass. He exits just before Schwantz gets to him, but Schwantz has momentum and takes the win on the line.

On the cool down lap, Rainey and Schwantz exchange a handshake and teasing jabs and Rainey put his head on the tank in embarrassment. On the podium, Rainey is subdued but not angry-looking.

Schwantz: "On the last lap Wayne put together a lap that had absolutely no flaws in it anywhere. Coming into the chicane for the last time I'm sure he had me by more than three quarters of a second. He just outbroke himself going in, got on the grass and I managed to beat him across the line. I kind of feel that it was Hockenheim that caused it to happen, I know that's all Wayne was thinking about, that he wasn't going to let me do the same thing I'd done to him in Germany. I think had he taken a quick glance over his shoulder anywhere round that last lap he would have realised it wasn't down to an outbraking manoeuvre at the chicane, he had me beat."

== 500 cc classification ==
| Pos. | Rider | Team | Manufacturer | Time/Retired | Points |
|---|---|---|---|---|---|
| 1 | (United States) Kevin Schwantz | Lucky Strike Suzuki | Suzuki | 41:24.916 | 20 |
| 2 | (United States) Wayne Rainey | Marlboro Team Roberts | Yamaha | +1.090 | 17 |
| 3 | (Australia) Wayne Gardner | Rothmans Honda Team | Honda | +12.766 | 15 |
| 4 | (United States) Eddie Lawson | Cagiva Corse | Cagiva | +16.973 | 13 |
| 5 | (Belgium) Didier de Radiguès | Lucky Strike Suzuki | Suzuki | +31.091 | 11 |
| 6 | (United States) John Kocinski | Marlboro Team Roberts | Yamaha | +32.094 | 10 |
| 7 | (Brazil) Alex Barros | Cagiva Corse | Cagiva | +34.476 | 9 |
| 8 | (France) Jean Philippe Ruggia | Sonauto Yamaha Mobil 1 | Yamaha | +49.225 | 8 |
| 9 | (France) Adrien Morillas | Sonauto Yamaha Mobil 1 | Yamaha | +1:18.055 | 7 |
| 10 | (Spain) Sito Pons | Campsa Honda Team | Honda | +1:20.994 | 6 |
| 11 | (United States) Doug Chandler | Roberts B Team | Yamaha | +1:24.323 | 5 |
| 12 | (Spain) Juan Garriga | Ducados Yamaha | Yamaha | +2:34.160 | 4 |
| 13 | (Netherlands) Cees Doorakkers | HEK-Baumachines | Honda | +1 Lap | 3 |
| 14 | (Germany) Michael Rudroff | Rallye Sport | Honda | +1 Lap | 2 |
| 15 | (Switzerland) Nicholas Schmassman | Schmassman Technotron | Honda | +1 Lap | 1 |
| Ret | (Republic of Ireland) Eddie Laycock | Millar Racing | Yamaha | Retirement | |
| Ret | (Germany) Helmut Schutz | Rallye Sport | Honda | Retirement | |
| Ret | (United Kingdom) Damon Buckmaster | Padgett's Racing Team | Suzuki | Retirement | |
| Ret | (Germany) Hans Becker | Team Romero Racing | Yamaha | Retirement | |
| Ret | (Australia) Mick Doohan | Rothmans Honda Team | Honda | Retirement | |
| DNQ | (Luxembourg) Andreas Leuthe | Librenti Corse | Suzuki | Did not qualify | |
| DNQ | (Germany) Martin Trösch | MT Racing | Honda | Did not qualify | |

| Previous race: 1991 European Grand Prix | FIM Grand Prix World Championship; 1991 season | Next race: 1991 French Grand Prix |
| Previous race: 1990 Dutch TT | Dutch TT | Next race: 1992 Dutch TT |
