= 1991 Malaysian motorcycle Grand Prix =

(Malaysia) 1991 Malaysian Grand Prix
Race details
- Race 15 of 15 races in the 1991 Grand Prix motorcycle racing season
- Date: 29 September 1991
- Official name: Lucky Strike Malaysia Grand Prix
- Location: Shah Alam Circuit
- Course: Permanent racing facility; 3.69 km (2.29 mi)

500cc
Pole position
- Rider: (United States) John Kocinski
- Time: 1:24.903
Fastest lap
- Rider: (United States) John Kocinski
- Time: 1:25.100
Podium
- First: (United States) John Kocinski
- Second: (Australia) Wayne Gardner
- Third: (Australia) Mick Doohan

250cc
Pole position
- Rider: (Spain) Carlos Cardús
- Time: 1:27.594
Fastest lap
- Rider: (Italy) Luca Cadalora
- Time: 1:27.826
Podium
- First: (Italy) Luca Cadalora
- Second: (Spain) Carlos Cardús
- Third: (Germany) Helmut Bradl

125cc
Pole position
- Rider: (Japan) Kazuto Sakata
- Time: 1:33.597
Fastest lap
- Rider: (Japan) Noboiuki Wakai
- Time: 1:33.172
Podium
- First: (Italy) Loris Capirossi
- Second: (Japan) Kazuto Sakata
- Third: (Japan) Noboiuki Wakai

The 1991 Malaysian motorcycle Grand Prix was the last round of the 1991 Grand Prix motorcycle racing season. It took place on the weekend of 27–29 September 1991 at the Shah Alam circuit.

== 500 cc race report ==
Wayne Rainey and Kevin Schwantz out with broken bones in pre-race practice: Schwantz with a broken hand, Rainey with a broken femur at the knee joint. Months of rehabilitation were required for Rainey to get range of motion back into the leg.

John Kocinski on pole. Mick Doohan takes the start from Wayne Gardner and Kocinski.

Kocinski takes the lead from Gardner, with Doohan in 3rd looking like his set-up is wrong, his bike vibrating visibly.

Kocinski opens a large gap and wins. On the podium, Gardner and Doohan look at each other and simultaneously spray champagne on Kocinski, who runs off the stage in a panic. Kocinski is notorious for being obsessed with cleanliness.

The 1991 Malaysian motorcycle Grand Prix was the final race for Didier de Radigues and 2-times 250cc World Champion Sito Pons.

== 500 cc classification ==
Pos.	Rider	Team	Manufacturer	Time/Retired	Points
1	(United States) John Kocinski	Marlboro Team Roberts	Yamaha	50:05.945	20
2	(Australia) Wayne Gardner	Rothmans Honda Team	Honda	+6.145	17
3	(Australia) Mick Doohan	Rothmans Honda Team	Honda	+21.070	15
4	(Spain) Juan Garriga	Ducados Yamaha	Yamaha	+39.088	13
5	(Australia) Kevin Magee	Lucky Strike Suzuki	Yamaha	+41.520	11
6	(United Kingdom) Niall Mackenzie	Roberts B Team	Yamaha	+1:01.504	10
7	(France) Adrien Morillas	Sonauto Yamaha Mobil 1	Yamaha	+1:25.351	9
8	(Belgium) Didier de Radiguès	Lucky Strike Suzuki	Suzuki	+1:25.912	8
9	(Italy) Marco Papa	Team Marco Papa	Honda	+2 Laps	7
10	(Netherlands) Cees Doorakkers	HEK-Baumachines	Honda	+2 Laps	6
11	(Germany) Hans Becker	Team Romero Racing	Yamaha	+2 Laps	5
12	(Republic of Ireland) Eddie Laycock	Millar Racing	Yamaha	+2 Laps	4
13	(Austria) Josef Doppler	Doppler Racing	Yamaha	+3 Laps	3
14	(Switzerland) Nicholas Schmassman	Schmassman Technotron	Honda	+6 Laps	2
Ret	(Spain) Sito Pons	Campsa Honda Team	Honda	Retirement	
Ret	(France) Jean Philippe Ruggia	Sonauto Yamaha Mobil 1	Yamaha	Retirement	
Ret	(United States) Doug Chandler	Roberts B Team	Yamaha	Retirement	

Previous race: 1991 Vitesse du Mans Grand Prix	FIM Grand Prix World Championship; 1991 season	Next race: 1992 Japanese Grand Prix
Previous race: None	Malaysian Grand Prix	Next race: 1992 Malaysian Grand Prix
