= 1991 San Marino motorcycle Grand Prix =

1991 San Marino Grand Prix
Race details
- Race 12 of 15 races in the 1991 Grand Prix motorcycle racing season
- Date: 18 August 1991
- Official name: Gran Premio di San Marino
- Location: Autodromo Internazionale del Mugello
- Course: Permanent racing facility; 5.245 km (3.259 mi)

500cc
Pole position
- Rider: (United States) Kevin Schwantz
- Time: 1:54.276
Fastest lap
- Rider: (United States) Kevin Schwantz
- Time: 1:54.461
Podium
- First: (United States) Wayne Rainey
- Second: (United States) Kevin Schwantz
- Third: (Australia) Mick Doohan

250cc
Pole position
- Rider: (Germany) Helmut Bradl
- Time: 1:58.492
Fastest lap
- Rider: (Italy) Luca Cadalora
- Time: 1:57.865
Podium
- First: (Italy) Luca Cadalora
- Second: (Spain) Carlos Cardús
- Third: (Italy) Loris Reggiani

125cc
Pole position
- Rider: (Japan) Noboru Ueda
- Time: 2:06.019
Fastest lap
- Rider: (Germany) Peter Öttl
- Time: 2:04.988
Podium
- First: (Germany) Peter Öttl
- Second: (Italy) Loris Capirossi
- Third: (Italy) Fausto Gresini

The 1991 San Marino motorcycle Grand Prix was the twelfth round of the 1991 Grand Prix motorcycle racing season. It took place on the weekend of 16–18 August 1991 at the Mugello Circuit.

== 500 cc race report ==
5th pole of the season for Kevin Schwantz. Wayne Rainey gets the start from Wayne Gardner, Schwantz and Mick Doohan.

Rainey and Doohan get away, Doohan superior on the brakes at the end of the straight. Schwantz is a close 3rd.

Rainey drops Doohan, who is caught by Schwantz.

== 500 cc classification ==
Pos.	Rider	Team	Manufacturer	Time/Retired	Points
1	(United States) Wayne Rainey	Marlboro Team Roberts	Yamaha	46:08.566	20
2	(United States) Kevin Schwantz	Lucky Strike Suzuki	Suzuki	+2.946	17
3	(Australia) Mick Doohan	Rothmans Honda Team	Honda	+6.066	15
4	(Australia) Wayne Gardner	Rothmans Honda Team	Honda	+23.218	13
5	(United Kingdom) Niall Mackenzie	Sonauto Yamaha Mobil 1	Yamaha	+33.205	11
6	(United States) John Kocinski	Marlboro Team Roberts	Yamaha	+37.614	10
7	(Spain) Juan Garriga	Ducados Yamaha	Yamaha	+39.280	9
8	(Belgium) Didier de Radiguès	Lucky Strike Suzuki	Suzuki	+39.566	8
9	(United States) Doug Chandler	Roberts B Team	Yamaha	+52.121	7
10	(France) Jean Philippe Ruggia	Sonauto Yamaha Mobil 1	Yamaha	+1:15.609	6
11	(Republic of Ireland) Eddie Laycock	Millar Racing	Yamaha	+1 Lap	5
12	(Italy) Marco Papa	Cagiva Corse	Cagiva	+1 Lap	4
13	(Netherlands) Cees Doorakkers	HEK-Baumachines	Honda	+1 Lap	3
14	(Germany) Michael Rudroff	Rallye Sport	Honda	+1 Lap	2
15	(Germany) Hans Becker	Team Romero Racing	Yamaha	+1 Lap	1
16	(Austria) Josef Doppler	Doppler Racing	Yamaha	+1 Lap	
17	(Italy) Romolo Balbi		Honda	+1 Lap	
18	(Luxembourg) Andreas Leuthe	Librenti Corse	Suzuki	+2 Laps	
19	(Germany) Helmut Schutz	Rallye Sport	Honda	+2 Laps	
Ret	(Spain) Sito Pons	Campsa Honda Team	Honda	Retirement	
Ret	(Italy) Michele Valdo	Team Paton	Paton	Retirement	
Ret	(United States) Eddie Lawson	Cagiva Corse	Cagiva	Retirement	
Ret	(France) Adrien Morillas	Sonauto Yamaha Mobil 1	Yamaha	Retirement	
DNQ	(Switzerland) Nicholas Schmassman	Schmassman Technotron	Honda	Did not qualify	
DNQ	(Venezuela) Larry Moreno Vacondio		Honda	Did not qualify	

Previous race: 1991 British Grand Prix	FIM Grand Prix World Championship; 1991 season	Next race: 1991 Czechoslovak Grand Prix
Previous race: 1987 San Marino Grand Prix	San Marino Grand Prix	Next race: 1993 San Marino Grand Prix
