= 1991 Czechoslovak motorcycle Grand Prix =

Motorcycle race meeting

(Czechoslovakia) 1991 Czechoslovak Grand Prix
Race details
- Race 13 of 15 races in the 1991 Grand Prix motorcycle racing season
- Date: August 25 1991
- Official name: Grand Prix ČSFR-Brno
- Location: Brno Circuit
- Course: Permanent racing facility; 5.403 km (3.357 mi)

500cc
Pole position
- Rider: (United States) Wayne Rainey
- Time: 2:03.358
Fastest lap
- Rider: (United States) Wayne Rainey
- Time: 2:03.266
Podium
- First: (United States) Wayne Rainey
- Second: (Australia) Mick Doohan
- Third: (United States) John Kocinski

250cc
Pole position
- Rider: (Germany) Helmut Bradl
- Time: 2:07.160
Fastest lap
- Rider: (Germany) Helmut Bradl
- Time: 2:07.052
Podium
- First: (Germany) Helmut Bradl
- Second: (Spain) Carlos Cardús
- Third: (Italy) Luca Cadalora

125cc
Pole position
- Rider: (Italy) Loris Capirossi
- Time: 2:15.278
Fastest lap
- Rider: (Japan) Kazuto Sakata
- Time: 2:14.977
Podium
- First: (Italy) Alessandro Gramigni
- Second: (Italy) Loris Capirossi
- Third: (Italy) Gabriele Debbia

The 1991 Czechoslovak motorcycle Grand Prix was the thirteenth round of the 1991 Grand Prix motorcycle racing season. It took place on the weekend of 23–25 August 1991 at the Masaryk Circuit located in Brno, Czechoslovakia.

== 500 cc race report ==
Wayne Rainey on pole, his 6th for the season; Mick Doohan 0.1 seconds behind. Doohan gets the start from Rainey.

Mick Doohan set the fastest lap on lap 8, while Rainey remained close behind. The two fought closely on the final lap, with Rainey finishing ahead of Doohan.

Rainey on how to beat Doohan: "I'd just sit on his wheel in the middle part of the race, and I'd make sure he could feel me, so he’d have to work his front tire harder, braking later and going deeper into the bends. As the tire got used up, his bike'd start to push and run out wide. Then I'd pass him and up the pace, and he couldn't stay with me."

== 500 cc classification ==
Pos.	Rider	Team	Manufacturer	Time/Retired	Points
1	(United States) Wayne Rainey	Marlboro Team Roberts	Yamaha	47:32.169	20
2	(Australia) Mick Doohan	Rothmans Honda Team	Honda	+3.204	17
3	(United States) John Kocinski	Marlboro Team Roberts	Yamaha	+19.939	15
4	(Australia) Wayne Gardner	Rothmans Honda Team	Honda	+24.403	13
5	(United States) Kevin Schwantz	Lucky Strike Suzuki	Suzuki	+25.039	11
6	(Spain) Juan Garriga	Ducados Yamaha	Yamaha	+33.195	10
7	(Belgium) Didier de Radiguès	Lucky Strike Suzuki	Suzuki	+52.768	9
8	(United States) Eddie Lawson	Cagiva Corse	Cagiva	+53.356	8
9	(Spain) Sito Pons	Campsa Honda Team	Honda	+1:22.765	7
10	(United States) Doug Chandler	Roberts B Team	Yamaha	+1:24.755	6
11	(Republic of Ireland) Eddie Laycock	Millar Racing	Yamaha	+1 Lap	5
12	(Germany) Michael Rudroff	Rallye Sport	Honda	+1 Lap	4
13	(Netherlands) Cees Doorakkers	HEK-Baumachines	Honda	+1 Lap	3
14	(Germany) Hans Becker	Team Romero Racing	Yamaha	+1 Lap	2
15	(United Kingdom) Simon Buckmaster	Padgett's Racing Team	Suzuki	+1 Lap	1
16	(Austria) Josef Doppler	Doppler Racing	Yamaha	+1 Lap	
17	(Switzerland) Nicholas Schmassman	Schmassman Technotron	Honda	+2 Laps	
Ret	(Germany) Martin Trösch	MT Racing	Honda	Retirement	
Ret	(Luxembourg) Andreas Leuthe	Librenti Corse	Suzuki	Retirement	
DNS	(France) Jean Philippe Ruggia	Sonauto Yamaha Mobil 1	Yamaha	Did not start	
DNS	(France) Adrien Morillas	Sonauto Yamaha Mobil 1	Yamaha	Did not start	
DNQ	(Germany) Helmut Schutz	Rallye Sport	Honda	Did not qualify	
DNQ	(Italy) Vincenzo Cascino	Vogt Honda	Honda	Did not qualify	

Previous race: 1991 San Marino Grand Prix	FIM Grand Prix World Championship; 1991 season	Next race: 1991 Vitesse du Mans Grand Prix
Previous race: 1990 Czechoslovak Grand Prix	Czechoslovak Grand Prix	Next race: 1993 Czech Republic Grand Prix
