= 1991 European motorcycle Grand Prix =

(Europe) 1991 European Grand Prix
Race details
- Race 8 of 15 races in the 1991 Grand Prix motorcycle racing season
- Date: 16 June 1991
- Official name: G.P. de Europa
- Location: Circuito del Jarama
- Course: Permanent racing facility; 3.404 km (2.115 mi)

500cc
Pole position
- Rider: (United States) Kevin Schwantz
- Time: 1:33.940
Fastest lap
- Rider: (United States) Wayne Rainey
- Time: 1:34.815
Podium
- First: (United States) Wayne Rainey
- Second: (Australia) Mick Doohan
- Third: (Australia) Wayne Gardner

250cc
Pole position
- Rider: (Italy) Luca Cadalora
- Time: 1:36.904
Fastest lap
- Rider: (Italy) Luca Cadalora
- Time: 1:37.082
Podium
- First: (Italy) Luca Cadalora
- Second: (Germany) Helmut Bradl
- Third: (Spain) Carlos Cardús

125cc
Pole position
- Rider: (Italy) Ezio Gianola
- Time: 1:43.224
Fastest lap
- Rider: (Italy) Loris Capirossi
- Time: 1:43.221
Podium
- First: (Italy) Loris Capirossi
- Second: (Italy) Fausto Gresini
- Third: (Germany) Peter Öttl

The 1991 European motorcycle Grand Prix was the eighth round of the 1991 Grand Prix motorcycle racing season. It took place on the weekend of 14–16 June 1991 at the Circuito del Jarama.

== 500 cc race report ==
Kevin Schwantz on pole. Mick Doohan gets a very good start from Wayne Rainey, Wayne Gardner, Schwantz, Eddie Lawson and John Kocinski.

Doohan and Rainey pulling away; Rainey pulls a draft pass and starts dropping Doohan. Schwantz is drifting both tires and dramatically getting the bike sideways.

== 500 cc classification ==
Pos.	Rider	Team	Manufacturer	Time/Retired	Points
1	(United States) Wayne Rainey	Marlboro Team Roberts	Yamaha	51:01.408	20
2	(Australia) Mick Doohan	Rothmans Honda Team	Honda	+7.647	17
3	(Australia) Wayne Gardner	Rothmans Honda Team	Honda	+25.917	15
4	(United States) Kevin Schwantz	Lucky Strike Suzuki	Suzuki	+33.315	13
5	(United States) John Kocinski	Marlboro Team Roberts	Yamaha	+40.316	11
6	(Spain) Juan Garriga	Ducados Yamaha	Yamaha	+43.032	10
7	(France) Jean Philippe Ruggia	Sonauto Yamaha Mobil 1	Yamaha	+48.202	9
8	(France) Adrien Morillas	Sonauto Yamaha Mobil 1	Yamaha	+1:12.257	8
9	(United States) Doug Chandler	Roberts B Team	Yamaha	+1:17.265	7
10	(Belgium) Didier de Radiguès	Lucky Strike Suzuki	Suzuki	+1:17.750	6
11	(Spain) Sito Pons	Campsa Honda Team	Honda	+1:18.120	5
12	(Republic of Ireland) Eddie Laycock	Millar Racing	Yamaha	+1 Lap	4
13	(Netherlands) Cees Doorakkers	HEK-Baumachines	Honda	+2 Laps	3
14	(Germany) Michael Rudroff	Rallye Sport	Honda	+2 Laps	2
15	(Switzerland) Nicholas Schmassman	Schmassman Technotron	Honda	+2 Laps	1
16	(Germany) Hans Becker	Team Romero Racing	Yamaha	+2 Laps	
17	(Austria) Josef Doppler	Doppler Racing	Yamaha	+2 Laps	
Ret	(United States) Eddie Lawson	Cagiva Corse	Cagiva	Retirement	
Ret	(United Kingdom) Damon Buckmaster	Padgett's Racing Team	Suzuki	Retirement	
Ret	(Italy) Marco Papa	Cagiva Corse	Cagiva	Retirement	
Ret	(Luxembourg) Andreas Leuthe	Librenti Corse	Suzuki	Retirement	

Previous race: 1991 Austrian Grand Prix	FIM Grand Prix World Championship; 1991 season	Next race: 1991 Dutch TT
Previous race: None	European Grand Prix	Next race: 1992 European Grand Prix
