= 1991 British motorcycle Grand Prix =

(United Kingdom) 1991 British Grand Prix
Race details
- Race 11 of 15 races in the 1991 Grand Prix motorcycle racing season
- Date: 4 August 1991
- Official name: Shell British Motorcycle Grand Prix
- Location: Donington Park
- Course: Permanent racing facility; 4.023 km (2.500 mi)

500cc
Pole position
- Rider: (United States) Kevin Schwantz
- Time: 1:32.974
Fastest lap
- Rider: (United States) Kevin Schwantz
- Time: 1:33.569
Podium
- First: (United States) Kevin Schwantz
- Second: (United States) Wayne Rainey
- Third: (Australia) Mick Doohan

250cc
Pole position
- Rider: (Italy) Loris Reggiani
- Time: 1:36.356
Fastest lap
- Rider: (Italy) Loris Reggiani
- Time: 1:36.200
Podium
- First: (Italy) Luca Cadalora
- Second: (Spain) Carlos Cardús
- Third: (Germany) Helmut Bradl

125cc
Pole position
- Rider: (Italy) Loris Capirossi
- Time: 1:42.928
Fastest lap
- Rider: (Italy) Loris Capirossi
- Time: 1:43.155
Podium
- First: (Italy) Loris Capirossi
- Second: (Italy) Fausto Gresini
- Third: (Germany) Peter Öttl

The 1991 British motorcycle Grand Prix was the eleventh round of the 1991 Grand Prix motorcycle racing season. It took place on the weekend of 2–4 August 1991 at Donington Park.

== 500 cc race report ==
Kevin Schwantz on pole, Wayne Rainey 0.02 seconds back in 2nd, Mick Doohan 1 second down in 6th. John Kocinski gets the start from 3rd over Wayne Gardner, Doohan and Rainey.

Kocinski opens up a small gap to Schwantz, then a gap to a 3-man fight for 3rd between Rainey, Gardner and Doohan.

Schwantz takes the lead from Kocinski as Rainey arrives to make it a trio. Doohan makes it a quartet on lap 7.

Rainey and Schwantz drop Doohan and Kocinski, and they are swapping the lead often.

On the penultimate lap approaching the Melbourne Hairpin, from far behind Schwantz swoops in on Rainey on the brakes and passes around the outside in one of Schwantz's most memorable overtaking maneuvers. Rainey is not able to recover while Schwantz widens his lead to a comfortable gap as he crosses the finish line.

== 500 cc classification ==
| Pos. | Rider | Team | Manufacturer | Time/Retired | Points |
|---|---|---|---|---|---|
| 1 | (United States) Kevin Schwantz | Lucky Strike Suzuki | Suzuki | 47:12.182 | 20 |
| 2 | (United States) Wayne Rainey | Marlboro Team Roberts | Yamaha | +0.788 | 17 |
| 3 | (Australia) Mick Doohan | Rothmans Honda Team | Honda | +19.188 | 15 |
| 4 | (United States) John Kocinski | Marlboro Team Roberts | Yamaha | +24.857 | 13 |
| 5 | (Australia) Wayne Gardner | Rothmans Honda Team | Honda | +29.617 | 11 |
| 6 | (United States) Eddie Lawson | Cagiva Corse | Cagiva | +31.179 | 10 |
| 7 | (United Kingdom) Niall Mackenzie | Roberts B Team | Yamaha | +35.348 | 9 |
| 8 | (Belgium) Didier de Radiguès | Lucky Strike Suzuki | Suzuki | +37.846 | 8 |
| 9 | (Spain) Juan Garriga | Ducados Yamaha | Yamaha | +49.967 | 7 |
| 10 | (Italy) Marco Papa | Cagiva Corse | Cagiva | +1 Lap | 6 |
| 11 | (Republic of Ireland) Eddie Laycock | Millar Racing | Yamaha | +1 Lap | 5 |
| 12 | (United Kingdom) Ron Haslam | JPS Norton Racing | Norton | +1 Lap | 4 |
| 13 | (Germany) Michael Rudroff | Rallye Sport | Honda | +2 Laps | 3 |
| 14 | (Netherlands) Cees Doorakkers | HEK-Baumachines | Honda | +2 Laps | 2 |
| 15 | (Luxembourg) Andreas Leuthe | Librenti Corse | Suzuki | +2 Laps | 1 |
| 16 | (Germany) Helmut Schutz | Rallye Sport | Honda | +3 Laps | |
| 17 | (Austria) Josef Doppler | Doppler Racing | Yamaha | +3 Laps | |
| Ret | (France) Jean Philippe Ruggia | Sonauto Yamaha Mobil 1 | Yamaha | Retirement | |
| Ret | (Italy) Michele Valdo | Team Paton | Paton | Retirement | |
| Ret | (Switzerland) Nicholas Schmassman | Schmassman Technotron | Honda | Retirement | |
| Ret | (France) Adrien Morillas | Sonauto Yamaha Mobil 1 | Yamaha | Retirement | |
| Ret | (Germany) Hans Becker | Team Romero Racing | Yamaha | Retirement | |
| Ret | (Spain) Sito Pons | Campsa Honda Team | Honda | Retirement | |
| Ret | (United States) Doug Chandler | Roberts B Team | Yamaha | Retirement | |

| Previous race: 1991 French Grand Prix | FIM Grand Prix World Championship; 1991 season | Next race: 1991 San Marino Grand Prix |
| Previous race: 1990 British Grand Prix | British Grand Prix | Next race: 1992 British Grand Prix |
