= 1991 French motorcycle Grand Prix =

(France) 1991 French Grand Prix
Race details
- Race 10 of 15 races in the 1991 Grand Prix motorcycle racing season
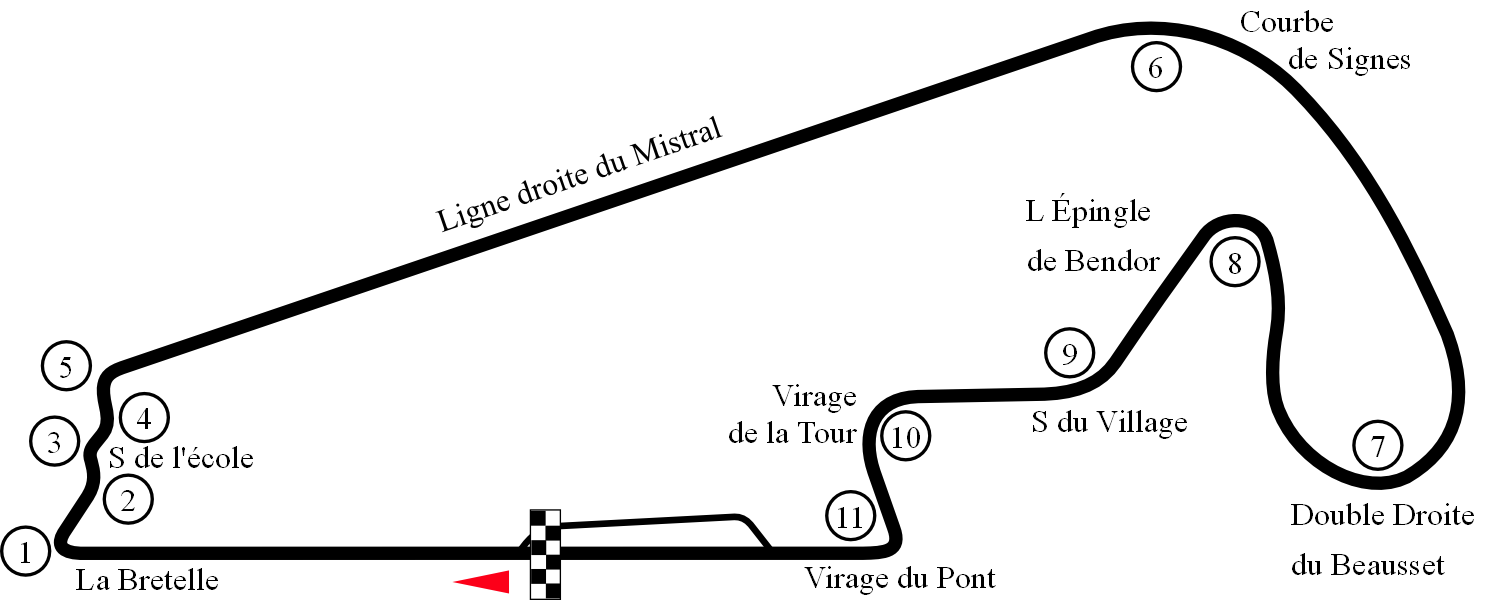
- Date: 21 July 1991
- Official name: Grand Prix de France
- Location: Circuit Paul Ricard
- Course: Permanent racing facility; 3.812 km (2.369 mi)

500cc
Pole position
- Rider: (United States) Wayne Rainey
- Time: 1:21.571
Fastest lap
- Rider: (United States) Wayne Rainey
- Time: 1:22.108
Podium
- First: (United States) Wayne Rainey
- Second: (Australia) Mick Doohan
- Third: (United States) Eddie Lawson

250cc
Pole position
- Rider: (Germany) Helmut Bradl
- Time: 1:25.955
Fastest lap
- Rider: (Italy) Loris Reggiani
- Time: 1:25.965
Podium
- First: (Italy) Loris Reggiani
- Second: (Germany) Helmut Bradl
- Third: (Spain) Carlos Cardús

125cc
Pole position
- Rider: (Japan) Noboru Ueda
- Time: 1:32.538
Fastest lap
- Rider: (Germany) Ralf Waldmann
- Time: 1:32.422
Podium
- First: (Italy) Loris Capirossi
- Second: (Germany) Ralf Waldmann
- Third: (Italy) Fausto Gresini

The 1991 French motorcycle Grand Prix was the tenth round of the 1991 Grand Prix motorcycle racing season. It took place on the weekend of 19–21 July 1991 at the Paul Ricard circuit

== 500 cc race report ==
Wayne Rainey started on pole, Mick Doohan started 2nd at .5 second, John Kocinski started 3rd and Kevin Schwantz started 4th on the grid. Doohan got the start from Schwantz, Eddie Lawson and Rainey. After a bad start, Kocinski crashed out hard on the first lap.

By the end of the first lap, Rainey is showing Doohan a front wheel and it's a 2-man fight for 1st very early with a 4-man group fighting for 3rd.

Rainey takes the lead from Doohan and Lawson and Schwantz remain behind to determine 3rd place.

On the last lap, Rainey expertly zigzags across the Mistral Straight, preventing Doohan from draft-passing, and Lawson wins his fight from Schwantz.

== 500 cc classification ==
Pos.	Rider	Team	Manufacturer	Time/Retired	Points
1	(United States) Wayne Rainey	Marlboro Team Roberts	Yamaha	44:13.070	20
2	(Australia) Mick Doohan	Rothmans Honda Team	Honda	+4.000	17
3	(United States) Eddie Lawson	Cagiva Corse	Cagiva	+23.646	15
4	(United States) Kevin Schwantz	Lucky Strike Suzuki	Suzuki	+23.730	13
5	(France) Jean Philippe Ruggia	Sonauto Yamaha Mobil 1	Yamaha	+31.387	11
6	(United States) Doug Chandler	Roberts B Team	Yamaha	+49.660	10
7	(Belgium) Didier de Radiguès	Lucky Strike Suzuki	Suzuki	+55.097	9
8	(France) Adrien Morillas	Sonauto Yamaha Mobil 1	Yamaha	+1:12.584	8
9	(Spain) Sito Pons	Campsa Honda Team	Honda	+1:17.300	7
10	(Australia) Wayne Gardner	Rothmans Honda Team	Honda	+2 Laps	6
11	(Spain) Juan Garriga	Ducados Yamaha	Yamaha	+2 Laps	5
12	(Netherlands) Cees Doorakkers	HEK-Baumachines	Honda	+2 Laps	4
13	(Italy) Marco Papa	Team Marco Papa	Honda	+2 Laps	3
14	(Germany) Michael Rudroff	Rallye Sport	Honda	+2 Laps	2
15	(Austria) Josef Doppler	Doppler Racing	Yamaha	+3 Laps	1
Ret	(Switzerland) Nicholas Schmassman	Schmassman Technotron	Honda	Retirement	
Ret	(Germany) Hans Becker	Team Romero Racing	Yamaha	Retirement	
Ret	(United States) John Kocinski	Marlboro Team Roberts	Yamaha	Retirement	
DNS	(France) Raymond Roche	Cagiva Corse	Cagiva	Did not start	
DNQ	(Luxembourg) Andreas Leuthe	Librenti Corse	Suzuki	Did not qualify	
DNQ	(Germany) Helmut Schutz	Rallye Sport	Honda	Did not qualify	
DNQ	(Germany) Martin Trösch	MT Racing	Honda	Did not qualify	
DNQ	(United Kingdom) Damon Buckmaster	Padgett's Racing Team	Suzuki	Did not qualify	

Previous race: 1991 Dutch TT	FIM Grand Prix World Championship; 1991 season	Next race: 1991 British Grand Prix
Previous race: 1990 French Grand Prix	French motorcycle Grand Prix	Next race: 1992 French Grand Prix
