= Antonio Cobas =

Spanish motorcycle designer

Antonio Cobas (Barcelona 1952 – April 14, 2004) was a Spanish Grand Prix motorcycle designer, constructor and mechanic who built world championship winning motorcycles. Cobas was credited with being the originator of the modern, aluminum frame chassis now used on many modern racing and production motorcycles.

== Career ==
In the early 1980s, racing motorcycles still used steel-tubed frames developed in the 1950s. As motorcycle engine and tire technology progressed, motorcycle frames became more and more stressed. In 1982, Cobas developed a stronger and lighter aluminum twin-beam chassis to replace the steel backbone frames. The technology was copied by major motorcycle manufacturers and by the 1990s, all the major racing teams in Grand Prix competition used the aluminum frame design pioneered by Cobas.

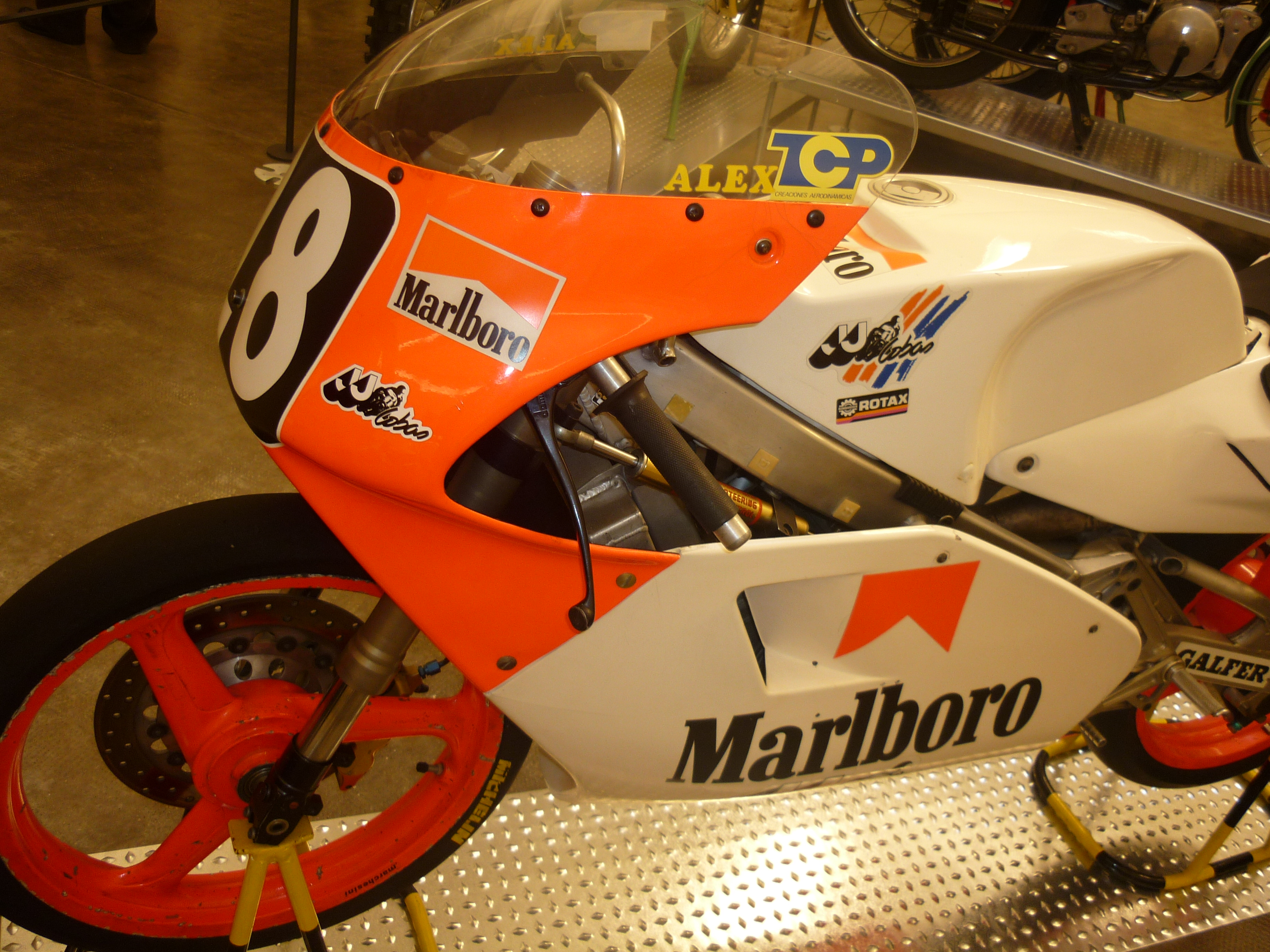
The 125cc JJ Cobas which Àlex Crivillé rode to win the 1989 world championship

Cobas began constructing racing motorcycles named Sirokas in 1978, which were successful in the Spanish road racing national championships. In 1982, he created the Kobas brand motorcycle designing his own chassis powered by Rotax engines. Spanish rider Sito Pons rode a Kobas to a third place at the Finnish Grand Prix and followed that with a fourth place at the Czechoslovak Grand Prix. The following year, Carlos Cardús won the 250cc European Championship riding a Kobas.

In 1983, Cobas formed a new motorcycle company named JJ Cobas. Pons would ride a JJ Cobas motorcycle in the 1984 250cc world championship, garnering their first Grand Prix victory with a win at the Spanish Grand Prix and, ended the season in fourth place in the championship. Even greater success came in 1989 when a Cobas-designed motorcycle ridden by Àlex Crivillé won the 125cc world championship.

When Pons moved to the Honda factory racing team in 1986, Cobas followed and served as Pons' crew chief. Pons retired as a competitor in 1991 and created the Pons Racing team, naming Cobas as Technical Director. In this role, he prepared motorcycles ridden to Grand Prix victories by Alberto Puig and Carlos Checa. He also rejoined Crivillé during his world championship winning year in 1999.

Cobas died in 2004 at the age of 52.
