= Interlagos Circuit =

Motorsport circuit in São Paulo, Brazil

Autódromo José Carlos Pace
- Grand Prix Circuit (5th Variation) (1999–present)
- Location: Interlagos, São Paulo, Brazil
- Coordinates: 23°42′4″S 46°41′50″W
- Capacity: 60,000
- FIA Grade: 1
- Broke ground: 1938
- Opened: 12 May 1940
- Former names: Autódromo de Interlagos (1940–1984)
- Major events: Current: Formula One; Brazilian Grand Prix (1972–1977, 1979–1980, 1990–2019); São Paulo Grand Prix (2021–present); FIA WEC; 6 Hours of São Paulo (2012–2014, 2024–present); Mil Milhas Brasil (1956–1961, 1965–1967, 1970, 1973, 1981, 1983–1990, 1992–1996, 1998, 2001–2008, 2020–present); TCR South America (2021–present); Stock Car Pro Series (1979–present); Former: Grand Prix motorcycle racing Brazilian motorcycle Grand Prix (1992); TCR World Tour (2024); World Series by Nissan (2002); SASTC (1997–1999); TC2000 (2007)
- Website: https://f1saopaulo.com.br/interlagos/ https://autodromodeinterlagos.com.br/

Grand Prix Circuit (5th Variation) (1999–present)
- Length: 4.309 km (2.677 mi)
- Turns: 15
- Race lap record: 1:10.540 ( (Finland) Valtteri Bottas, Mercedes W09, 2018, F1)

Stock Car Circuit with Chicane (2011–2017)
- Length: 4.314 km (2.681 mi)
- Turns: 17
- Race lap record: 1:40.066 ( (Brazil) Júlio Campos, Chevrolet Cruze Stock Car, 2016, Stock Car Brasil)

Grand Prix Circuit (4th Variation) (1996–1998)
- Length: 4.292 km (2.667 mi)
- Turns: 15
- Race lap record: 1:18.397 ( (Canada) Jacques Villeneuve, Williams FW19, 1997, F1)

Grand Prix Circuit (3rd Variation) (1990–1995)
- Length: 4.325 km (2.687 mi)
- Turns: 15
- Race lap record: 1:18.455 ( (Germany) Michael Schumacher, Benetton B194, 1994, F1)

Motorcycle Circuit (1992)
- Length: 4.352 km (2.704 mi)
- Turns: 17
- Race lap record: 1:42.872 ( (United States) Wayne Rainey, Yamaha YZR500, 1992, 500cc)

Grand Prix Circuit (2nd Variation) (1980–1989)
- Length: 7.873 km (4.892 mi)
- Turns: 26
- Race lap record: 2:27.311 ( (France) René Arnoux, Renault RE20, 1980, F1)

Original Grand Prix Circuit (1940–1979)
- Length: 7.960 km (4.946 mi)
- Turns: 26
- Race lap record: 2:28.76 ( (France) Jacques Laffite, Ligier JS11, 1979, F1)

The Autódromo José Carlos Pace, better known as Interlagos, is a 4.309 km (2.677 mi) motorsport circuit located in the city of São Paulo, Brazil. It was inaugurated on 12 May 1940, by the federal intervener of the state of São Paulo, Adhemar de Barros. In 1985, the circuit was renamed to honor the Formula 1 driver José Carlos Pace, who died in a plane crash in 1977. It is also his final resting place since 2024. It runs counterclockwise. The facilities also include a kart circuit named after Ayrton Senna.

The circuit has hosted the Formula One Brazilian Grand Prix since 1973, with the current contract set to expire in 2035. It previously hosted the Brazilian motorcycle Grand Prix in 1992, the Deutsche Tourenwagen Meisterschaft in 1996, the FIA GT1 World Championship in 2010, and the FIA World Endurance Championship from 2012 to 2014 only to return in 2024. As the major racetrack in the country it also hosted many previous and active national championships such as Stock Car Brasil, Campeonato Sudamericano de GT, Fórmula Truck, Copa Truck, Formula 3 Sudamericana, Brazilian Formula Three Championship, and Mil Milhas Brasil.

In addition, the Prova Ciclística 9 de Julho road cycling race was held at the venue from 2002 to 2006 and from 2008 to 2013. A local version of the Lollapalooza music festival has been held at the venue since 2014.

== History ==
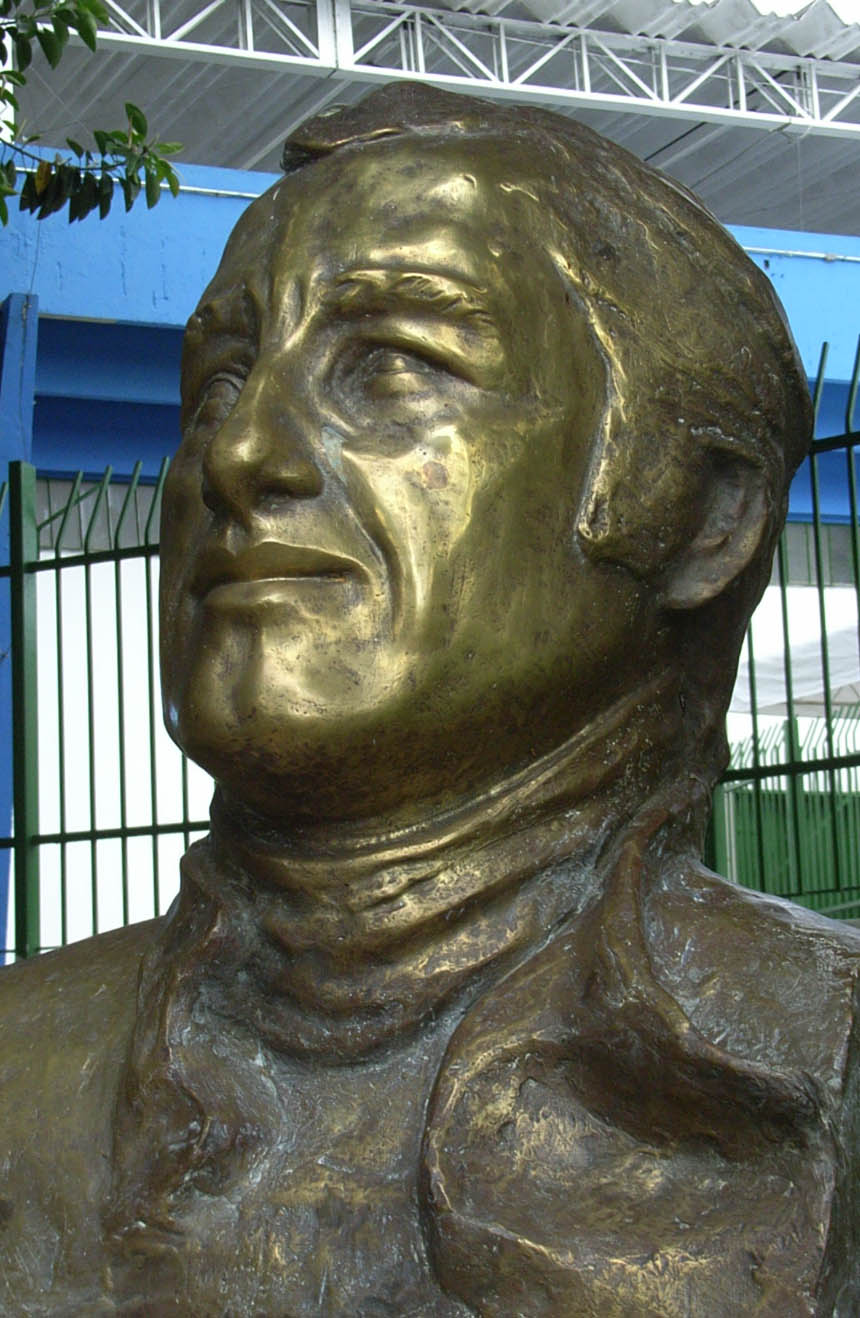
The bust of José Carlos Pace in the circuit

The land on which the circuit is located was originally bought in 1926 by property developers who wanted to build housing. Following difficulties partly due to the 1929 stock market crash, it was decided to build a racing circuit instead; construction started in 1938 and the track was inaugurated on 12 May 1940. Its design was inspired by tracks such as the Indianapolis Motor Speedway and Roosevelt Raceway in the United States, Brooklands in England, and Montlhéry in France.

The traditional name of the circuit, Interlagos (in Portuguese, "between lakes"), comes from its location on the neighborhood of the same name, a region between two large artificial lakes, Guarapiranga and Billings, built in the early 20th century to supply the metropolitan region of São Paulo with water and electric power. The name "Interlagos" was suggested by the French architect and urban planner Alfred Agache after the Interlaken region located in Switzerland. Interlagos was renamed in 1985 to "Autódromo José Carlos Pace" in honor of the Brazilian Formula One driver José Carlos Pace, also known as "Moco", who died in a plane crash in 1977.

Formula One started racing at Interlagos in 1972, when the event was run as a non-championship race (won by Argentinean Carlos Reutemann). The first World Championship Brazilian Grand Prix was held there in 1973, and it was won by defending Formula One World Champion and São Paulo local Emerson Fittipaldi. Fittipaldi won the race again the following year, and José Carlos Pace won his only race at Interlagos in 1975.

Due to safety concerns with the 7.960 km (4.946 mi) original layout, including the bumpy surface, inadequate barriers, deep ditches and embankments, the last Formula One race held on the original Interlagos was in 1980, when it was nearly cancelled after protests by many Formula One drivers – including defending world champion Jody Scheckter. The safety concerns were directed towards the track surface, which BBC commentator Murray Walker described as "appallingly bumpy". Most of the ground-effect cars of 1980 were designed in such a way that bumpy surfaces were barely tolerable for the drivers. These factors meant that Formula One would move back to the Jacarepaguá circuit in Rio de Janeiro, hometown of Nelson Piquet and where the Brazilian Grand Prix was held in 1978. Formula One returned to the circuit in 1990 after it had been shortened and modified at a cost of $15 million. The track layout, aside from the pit exit being extended along the "Curva do Sol" turn, has remained the same since 1990.

The circuit is often witness to dramatic results when it hosts the Formula One Brazilian Grand Prix, especially since its move to an end of season slot in 2004. Fernando Alonso won both the 2005 and 2006 world titles in Brazil, with Renault also clinching the constructors' title in 2006. Kimi Räikkönen won the 2007 World Championship here after being seven points down and in third place in the championship entering the final race of the season. Felipe Massa almost won the 2008 Driver's World Championship when he finished the 2008 Brazilian Grand Prix as winner, but was denied by Lewis Hamilton when he overtook Timo Glock in the final lap. Despite Rubens Barrichello's pole position in 2009, Mark Webber won the race and Jenson Button won the championship for Brawn after starting 14th. Williams got their first pole since 2005 here at the 2010 Brazilian Grand Prix with Nico Hülkenberg. The race was won by Sebastian Vettel, and with Mark Webber coming second, Red Bull secured the constructors title; however the driver's title was not confirmed until the last race of the season.

During the weekend of the 2023 race, one roof in the complex came off because of strong winds from a storm.

=== Tribute to José Carlos Pace ===
In August 2024, the body of José Carlos Pace was transferred from his vandalized mausoleum to the race circuit to be laid to rest in the race track named after him. The idea for this came from, and was organized by, the president of the Confederação Brasileira de Automobilismo (Brazilian Automobile Confederation) (CBA), Paulo "Loco" Figueiredo, the president of the Comissão Nacional de Carros Clássicos (National Classic Car Commission) and journalist Ricardo Caruso.

Pace's body arrived in Interlagos where he was buried next to the bust that stands there in his honor. The emotional ceremony was attended by Pace's family (his widow Elda, his children Patrícia and Rodrigo, and his grandchildren), friends, other drivers, journalists and admirers of "Moco". José Carlos Pace took one last lap around the track, where Rodrigo, "Moco's" son, drove a 1967 Karmann-Ghia racing car that was used by his father, from the old Dacon team, where Pace formed a trio with none other than the Fittipaldi brothers Emerson and Wilson Jr. at the time. This makes Pace the first deceased driver ever to be buried in a race circuit.

== Characteristics ==
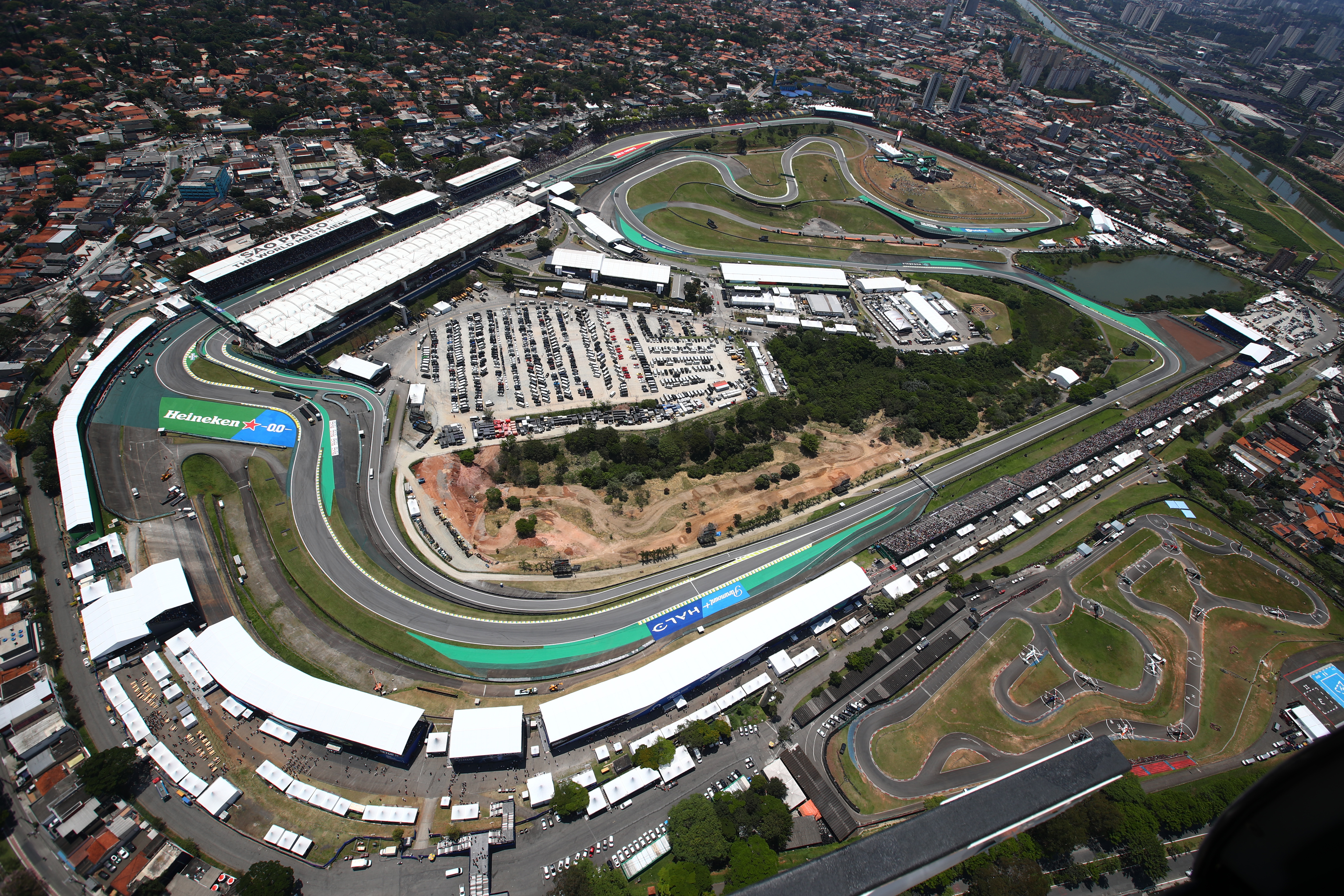
Aerial view of the circuit in 2022

One of the main characteristics of Interlagos is that it was not built on flat terrain, but follows the ups and downs of hilly ground, which makes it harder to drive and demands more power from the cars' engines. The races therefore can be tough on the car and physically demanding on the drivers, also because the circuit runs counterclockwise where the centrifugal forces push the drivers' necks to the right, instead of left as in most of the circuits on the F1 calendar. The hilly course is also a good feature for road cycling races, which are usually held at the circuit.

Additionally to the physical aspects there is also a climate component to the venue, the region where the track is located is known for having rapid changes in weather with outbursts of rain being common, which can vary from a short lived drizzle to a torrential storm. This can add a degree of unpredictability to the races and it's classically associated with the circuit. The city of São Paulo where the circuit is located is known by the nickname "Land of the Drizzle".

=== First reform ===
In 1979 upgrading work was done and the pit lane was extended past the first left-hand turn (1), making the corner more narrow, and the pit lane ended right in the middle of turn 1 and 2. The present design of the track dates back to 1990, when the original circuit was shortened from 7.87385 km (4.89258 mi) to 4.325 km (2.687 mi). As a consequence of the reduction, the track lost three long straight sections and nine fast curves (5 were lost forever, 4 were made slower and are still present). The original track was full of fast corners and it allowed cars to keep maximum speed for many seconds; it was considered dangerous, and in 1990 the old layout was mostly revised. The new track still had a very long top-speed section that contained bumps, high-speed turns and little run-off area though the track was very wide at this point.

=== Improvement in 2007 ===
For the 2007 Brazilian Grand Prix, the largest-scale repairs in the last 35 years were carried out at the circuit, to fundamentally solve problems with the track surface. The existing asphalt was entirely replaced, resulting in a much smoother track surface. At the same time, the pit lane entrance was enhanced to improve safety and to add a new fixed grand stand. To facilitate the work, the circuit was closed and no events were held in the five months immediately preceding the race.

On 17 October 2007, Companhia Paulista de Trens Metropolitanos (CPTM) began to operate the new station of the Line C (currently called Line 9), Autódromo, near the circuit. The Line C had been extended to improve the access between the center of São Paulo and southern region of the Greater São Paulo including the circuit, improving circuit accessibility.

=== 2012 redevelopment ===
Shortly before the 2011 Brazilian Grand Prix, FIA race director Charlie Whiting detailed several planned upgrades of the circuit, including a new pit entrance and expanded run-off at the final corner, as a response to several fatal accidents at the circuit in 2011. In June 2012, further details of the proposed plans emerged, calling for the construction of a brand new pit building and the relocation of the start line from its current position between Arquibancadas and the Senna 'S' to Reta Oposta. However, later it was decided to keep start/finish straight at its current location along with the new pit building.

=== Pit lane ===
Interlagos has one of the longest pit-lanes ever used in Formula One, starting just before the start-finish straight and rejoining the main course after Curva do Sol. Entering the pits was originally not a trivial task, as the high speed and the left turning may force the car rightwards, out of the pits. The pit lane entrance received some changes to become safer for the 2007 Formula One Brazilian Grand Prix, and later for the 2014 Formula One Brazilian Grand Prix, when a chicane was added.

== Track layout ==
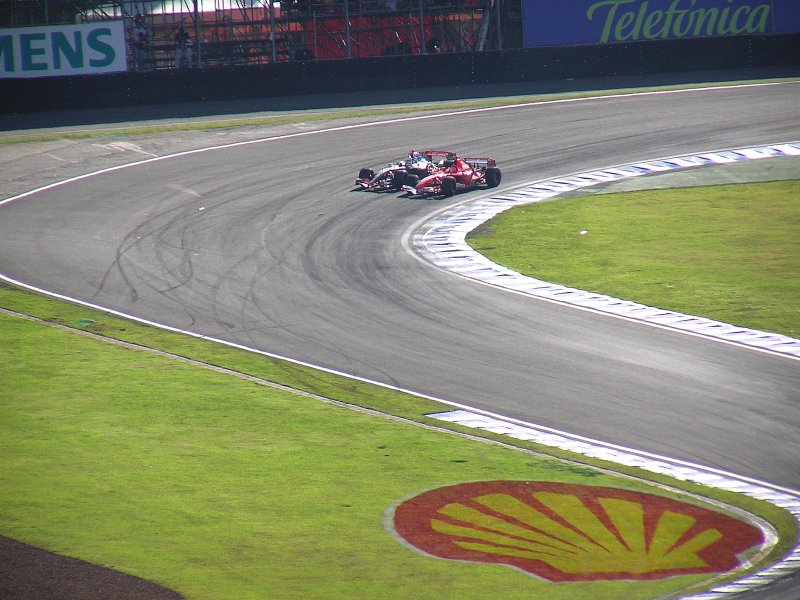
The first corner is the most popular overtaking spot. Michael Schumacher (red car) passes Kimi Räikkönen at the 2006 Brazilian GP.

Race start is in the "Tribunas" section and features a long straight with an upward inclination, then comes "S do Senna" (the Senna S) [1,2], a pair of alternating downward turns (left then right) that exhibit different attack angles and inclinations.

"S do Senna" connects with "Curva do Sol" (Curve of the Sun) [3], a round-shaped large-radius left turn that leads to "Reta Oposta" (Opposite Straight) the track's longest (but not the fastest) straight. Reta Oposta is succeeded by a pair of downhill left turns that are called "Descida do Lago" (Lake's Descent) [4,5] into a short straight section that climbs up towards the back of the pit buildings.

This is followed by a slow section, with small, kart-like turns and elevation changes. The first of these turns is known as "Ferradura" (Horseshoe) [6,7] downhill and right into "Laranjinha" (Little Orange) [8], another right turn and the slowest point of the circuit; the next turn leads into "Pinheirinho" (Little Pine Tree) [9], left on a plain field; then comes "Bico de Pato" (Duck Bill) [10] a right turn with a tight hairpin like shape; and then "Mergulho" (Dive) [11], a constant-radius left-hand turn that slings the driver straight into a harder left at "Junção" (Junction) [12].

Turn [13] "Café" (Coffee), is a left up-hill kink and marks the start of the long top-speed section. Rising up through "Subida dos Boxes" (Up to the Pits) [14], the driver encounters a long uphill left turn with a gradient of 10% that demands a lot of power from the cars. At the end of it comes Arquibancadas (Bleachers) [15], a wide high velocity left turn that connects to the "Tribunas" straight to complete the final section of the track.

The series of left turns from the exit of "Junção" all the way to Turn 1 is typically taken at full throttle and treated as a long straight. This section is one of the longest full-throttle stretches on the Formula 1 calendar, and thus demanding of the engine's reliability. Other notable stretches of this nature are the "Rettifilo Tribune" straight at Autodromo Nazionale di Monza and the Kemmel Straight at Circuit de Spa-Francorchamps.

List of the corners with their names (the numbers correspond to the current layout, from start to finish line):

- 'S' do Senna (Senna S) (1,2)
- Curva do Sol (Curve of the Sun) (3)
- Descida do Lago (Lake's Descent) (4,5)
- Ferradura (Horseshoe) (6,7)
- Laranjinha (Little Orange) (8)
- Pinheirinho (Little Pine Tree) (9)
- Bico de Pato (Duck's Bill) (10)
- Mergulho (Dive) (11)
- Junção (Junction) (12)
- Café (Coffee) (13)
- Subida dos Boxes (Up to the Pits) (14)
- Arquibancadas (Bleachers) (15)

== Layout history ==
Interlagos Circuit Layout History
Original Grand Prix Circuit (1940–1979)

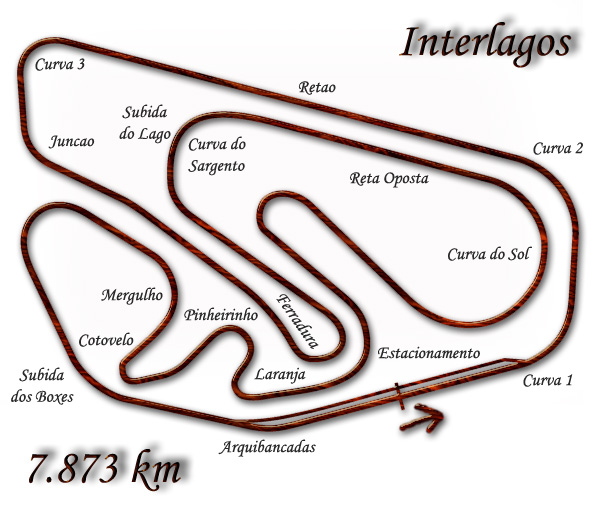
Grand Prix Circuit (2nd Variation) (1980–1989)

Grand Prix Circuit (5th Variation) (1999–present)

Motorcycle Circuit (1992)

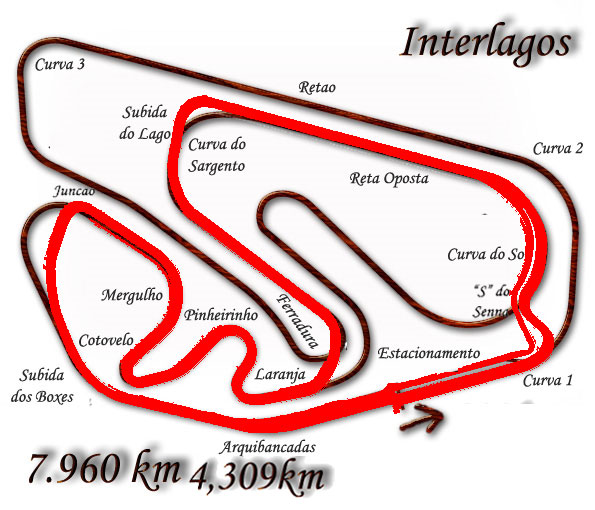
Overlay showing the differences between present-day and 1973 layouts

== Events ==
Current

- January: Mil Milhas Brasil
- February: Fórmula Truck, Brazilian Superbike Championship
- March: Porsche Cup Brasil
- April: TCR South America Touring Car Championship, Stock Car Pro Series, Stock Light, TCR Brazil Touring Car Championship, F4 Brazilian Championship, Brazilian Superbike Championship, Moto 1000 GP
- May: NASCAR Brasil Series, Copa Truck, Brazilian Superbike Championship, Império Endurance Brasil
- June: Brazilian Superbike Championship
- July: FIA World Endurance Championship 6 Hours of São Paulo, Brazilian Superbike Championship
- August: Moto 1000 GP
- September: Porsche Cup Brasil, F4 Brazilian Championship
- November: Formula One São Paulo Grand Prix, Porsche Cup Brasil, F4 Brazilian Championship
- December: Stock Car Pro Series, Stock Light, F4 Brazilian Championship, Turismo Nacional BR, Brazilian Superbike Championship

Former

- Brasileiro de Marcas (2011–2018)
- Brazilian Formula Three Championship (1989–1994, 2014–2017)
- Campeonato Sudamericano de GT (2007–2013)
- Ferrari Challenge North America (2013)
- FIA GT1 World Championship (2010)
- Fórmula Academy Sudamericana (2018–2019)
- Formula BMW Americas (2008)
- Formula 3 Brazil Open (2010–2014)
- Formula 3 Sudamericana (1987, 1989–1993, 1995, 1998–1999, 2003–2011, 2013)
- Formula Future Fiat (2010–2011)
- Formula One
  - Brazilian Grand Prix (1972–1977, 1979–1980, 1990–2019)
- Grand Prix motorcycle racing
  - Brazilian motorcycle Grand Prix (1992)
- International Formula 3000 (2001–2002)
- International Touring Car Championship (1996)
- Le Mans Series (2007)
- Prova Ciclística 9 de Julho (2002–2006, 2008–2013)
- South American Super Touring Car Championship (1997–1999)
- Stock Car Brasil
  - Stock Car Corrida do Milhão (2010–2013, 2016, 2019–2020)
- TC2000 Championship (2007)
- TCR World Tour (2024)
- Top Race V6 (2009–2010)
- World Series by Nissan (2002)

== Lap records ==
As of April 2026, the fastest official lap records at the Autódromo José Carlos Pace are listed as:

Category	Time	Driver	Vehicle	Event
Grand Prix Circuit (1999–present): 4.309 km (2.677 mi)
Formula One	1:10.540	Valtteri Bottas	Mercedes AMG F1 W09 EQ Power+	2018 Brazilian Grand Prix
LMP1	1:18.367	Andre Lotterer	Audi R18 e-tron quattro	2014 6 Hours of São Paulo
LMDh	1:24.498	Will Stevens	Cadillac V-Series.R	2025 6 Hours of São Paulo
LMH	1:24.801	Mike Conway	Toyota GR010	2024 6 Hours of São Paulo
LMP2	1:24.916	Olivier Pla	Ligier JS P2	2014 6 Hours of São Paulo
F3000	1:27.323	Sébastien Bourdais	Lola B02/50	2002 Interlagos F3000 round
Formula Three	1:28.282	Guilherme Samaia	Dallara F309	2016 1st Interlagos Formula 3 Brasil round
Formula Nissan	1:28.656	Bas Leinders	Dallara SN01	2002 Interlagos World Series by Nissan round
GT1 (GTS)	1:30.074	Oliver Gavin	Chevrolet Corvette C6.R	2007 Mil Milhas Brasil
LM GTE	1:30.101	Patrick Pilet	Porsche 911 RSR	2014 6 Hours of São Paulo
GT3	1:32.303	Victor Franzoni	Lamborghini Huracán GT3	2018 500 km of Interlagos
Sports car prototype	1:34.489	Aldo Piedade Jr.	Sigma P1 G4	2022 Mil Milhas Brasil
Formula 4	1:34.821	Gino Trappa	Tatuus F4-T421	2024 2nd Interlagos F4 Brazil round
Porsche Carrera Cup	1:35.744	Werner Neugebauer	Porsche 911 (992 I) GT3 Cup	2024 3rd Interlagos Porsche Cup Brasil round
Stock Car Brasil	1:36.058	Ricardo Mauricio	Chevrolet Cruze Stock Car	2019 Corrida do Milhão
Formula Renault 2.0	1:36.105	Alberto Valerio	Tatuus FR2000	2004 1st Interlagos Formula Renault 2.0 Brazil round
GT4	1:40.417	Renato Braga	Mercedes-AMG GT4	2020 Mil Milhas Brasil
Formula BMW	1:40.842	Alexander Rossi	Mygale FB02	2008 Interlagos Formula BMW Americas round
TCR Touring Car	1:42.044	Pedro Cardoso	Peugeot 308 GTi TCR	2025 Interlagos TCR South America round
Stock Light	1:42.439	Victor Tieri	Chevrolet Cruze JL-G12	2026 1st Interlagos Stock Light round
N-GT	1:42.569	Max Wilson	Porsche 911 (996) GT3-RS	2001 Mil Milhas Brasileiras
Ferrari Challenge	1:42.598	Alan Hellmeister	Ferrari F430 Challenge	2010 2nd Interlagos GT Brasil round
Formula Future Fiat	1:42.901	Nicolas Costa	Signatech-Fiat Formula Futuro	2010 Santa Cruz do Sul Formula Futuro Fiat round
Trofeo Maserati	1:43.885	Fábio Greco	Maserati Trofeo Light	2011 3rd Interlagos GT Brasil round
Super Touring	1:45.131	Cacá Bueno	Peugeot 406	1999 Interlagos SASTC round
TC2000	1:46.030	Marcelo Bugliotti	Chevrolet Astra	2007 Interlagos TC2000 round
Moto3	1:47.597	Kensei Matsudaira	Honda NSF250R	2026 Interlagos Moto4 Latin Cup round
Formula Renault 1.6	1:48.924	Juan Vieira	Signatech FR 1.6	2019 Interlagos Formula Academy Sudamericana round
NASCAR Brasil	1:49.364	Galid Osman	Chevrolet Camaro SS	2025 1st Interlagos NASCAR Brasil round
Turismo Nacional BR	1:55.776	Augusto Sangalli	Chevrolet New Onix	2025 1st Interlagos Turismo Nacional Brasil round
Truck racing	2:04.355	Leandro Totti	Iveco Truck	2025 1st Interlagos Copa Truck round
Stock Car Circuit with Chicane (2011–2017): 4.314 km (2.681 mi)
Stock Car Brasil	1:40.066	Júlio Campos	Chevrolet Cruze Stock Car	2016 Corrida do Milhão
Grand Prix Circuit (1996–1998): 4.292 km (2.667 mi)
Formula One	1:18.397	Jacques Villeneuve	Williams FW19	1997 Brazilian Grand Prix
Formula Three	1:34.320	Jaime Melo	Dallara F394	1998 Interlagos F3 Sudamericana round
Class 1 Touring Cars	1:35.014	Alessandro Nannini	Alfa Romeo 155 V6 TI	1996 Interlagos ITC round
GT2	1:42.329	Antônio Hermann	Porsche 911 (993) GT2	1997 500 km of Interlagos
Super Touring	1:48.062	Nonô Figueiredo	Chevrolet Vectra	1998 Interlagos SASTC round
Grand Prix Circuit (1990–1995): 4.325 km (2.687 mi)
Formula One	1:18.455	Michael Schumacher	Benetton B194	1994 Brazilian Grand Prix
Formula Three	1:36.990	Fernando Croceri	Ralt RT33	1993 Interlagos Formula 3 Sudamericana round
Group B	1:43.440	Christian Fittipaldi	Porsche 911 Carrera RSR 3.8	1994 Mil Milhas Brasileiras
Motorcycle Circuit (1992): 4.352 km (2.704 mi)
500cc	1:42.872	Wayne Rainey	Yamaha YZR500	1992 Brazilian motorcycle Grand Prix
250cc	1:44.478	Loris Reggiani	Aprilia RSV 250	1992 Brazilian motorcycle Grand Prix
125cc	1:50.262	Dirk Raudies	Honda RS125R	1992 Brazilian motorcycle Grand Prix
Grand Prix Circuit (1980–1989): 7.873 km (4.892 mi)
Formula One	2:27.311	René Arnoux	Renault RE20	1980 Brazilian Grand Prix
Original Grand Prix Circuit (1940–1979): 7.960 km (4.946 mi)
Formula One	2:28.760	Jacques Laffite	Ligier JS11	1979 Brazilian Grand Prix
Formula Two	2:37.900	Carlos Pace	Surtees TS15	1972 3rd Interlagos Torneio F2 round
Group 5	2:43.070	Wilson Fittipaldi	Porsche 917	1972 Interlagos Copa Brasil round
Group 6	2:50.800	Luís Pereira Bueno	Porsche 908/02	1971 Sud-Am Tournoi de Sao-Paulo
Formula Three	3:01.800	Carlos Pace	Lotus 59	1971 2nd Interlagos Torneio F3 round
Formula Libre	3:46.600	Chico Landi	Ferrari 125 C	1952 Interlagos Grand Prix

== See also ==
- Cidade Dutra
- Socorro
- Roman Catholic Diocese of Santo Amaro
- Subprefecture of Capela do Socorro
