= Niall Mackenzie =

British motorcycle racer

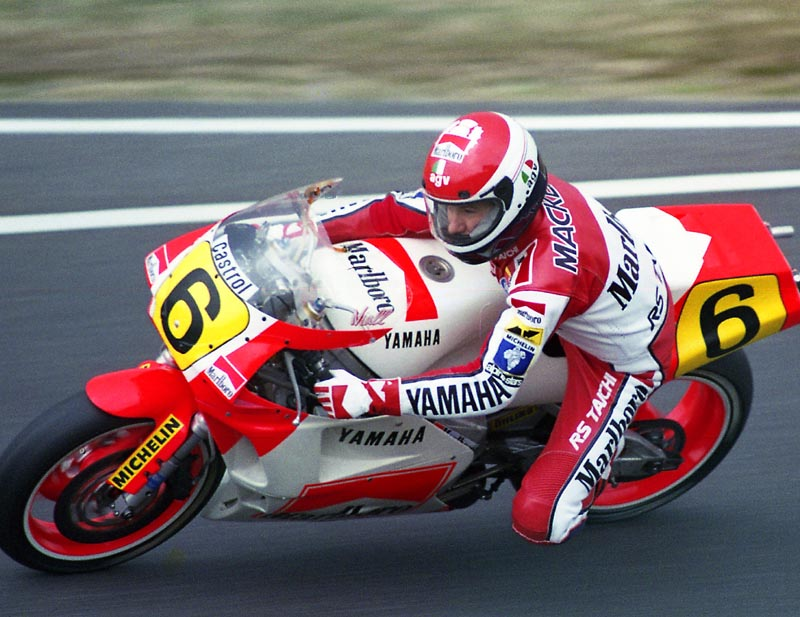
- Mackenzie at the 1989 Japanese Grand Prix
- Nationality: British
- Born: 19 July 1961 (age 65)
Motorcycle racing career statistics
Grand Prix motorcycle racing
Active years	1984 – 1995
First race	1984 250cc British Grand Prix
Last race	1995 250cc European Grand Prix
Team(s)	Armstrong, Suzuki, Honda, Yamaha, Aprilia
Championships	0
Starts / Wins / Podiums / Poles / F. laps / Points; 139 / 0 / 7 / 1 / 0 / 719

Niall Macfarlane Mackenzie (born 19 July 1961) is a Scottish former professional motorcycle road racer. He competed in Grand Prix motorcycle racing between 1984 and 1995.

== Career ==
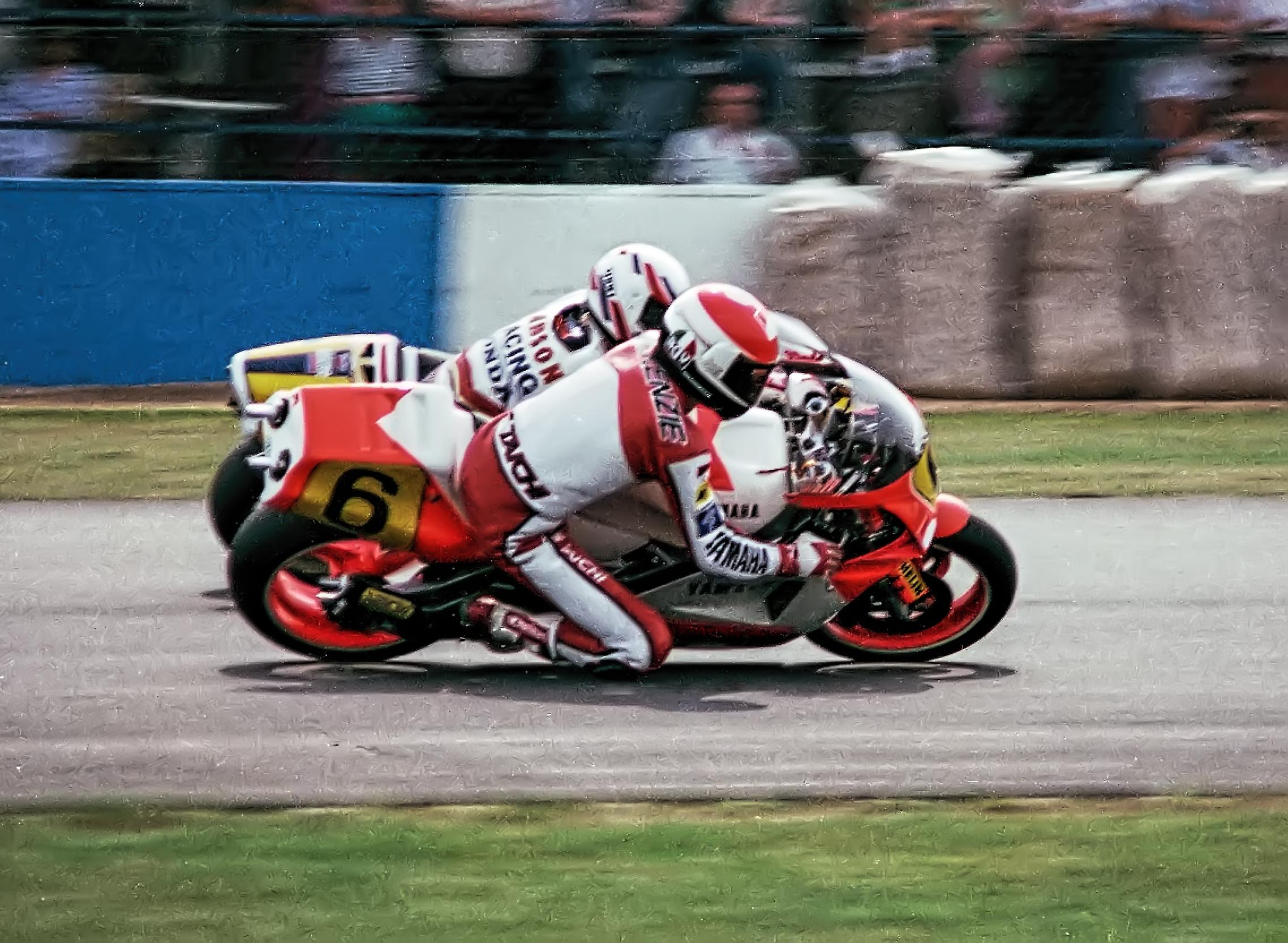
Niall Mackenzie, battling with Eddie Lawson at the 1989 British Grand Prix

Mackenzie, who hails from Fankerton, near Denny, Stirlingshire; won the British Superbike Championship three times from 1996 to 1998 with the Rob McElnea-run Yamaha team, and the British 250cc and 350cc titles twice earlier in his career. He had a long career in the Grand Prix motorcycle racing circuit, debuting in 1984 in the 250cc class. He moved up to the 500cc class in 1986 on a Suzuki before spells on Honda and Yamaha motorcycles. He was fourth in the championship in 1990, and finished in the top-ten in the championship on five other occasions. His final racing season was the 2000 British Superbike series, although he did a farewell one-off at Knockhill in 2001 and stood in for the injured Yukio Kagayama at Donington Park in 2003.

=== Honda CRX Challenge ===
In 1991, Mackenzie briefly competed in car racing, driving the #1 Celebrity car at Knockhill in that year's Honda CRX Challenge. In a rain-affected race, he was punted off at the first corner and his comeback drive was halted when he slid off at the last corner and slammed into the tyre barrier.

== Post-racing career ==
Mackenzie co-owns Mackenzie Hodgson Insurance, works in motorcycling media and instructs on track days around the UK and Europe.

== Personal life ==
Mackenzie has two sons; Tarran, who competes in the World Superbike Championship, and Taylor, who competed in Superstock 1000 before his retirement from competition after the 2021 season. Taylor won the British Superstock 1000cc Championship in 2016. Tarran won the British Supersport Championship in 2016 and the British Superbike Championship in 2021.

== Career statistics ==
=== Grand Prix ===
Points system from 1969 to 1987:

**Position**	1	2	3	4	5	6	7	8	9	10
**Points**	15	12	10	8	6	5	4	3	2	1

Points system from 1988 to 1991:

**Position**	1	2	3	4	5	6	7	8	9	10	11	12	13	14	15
**Points**	20	17	15	13	11	10	9	8	7	6	5	4	3	2	1

Points system in 1992:

**Position**	1	2	3	4	5	6	7	8	9	10
**Points**	20	15	12	10	8	6	4	3	2	1

Points system from 1993 onwards:

**Position**	1	2	3	4	5	6	7	8	9	10	11	12	13	14	15
**Points**	25	20	16	13	11	10	9	8	7	6	5	4	3	2	1

(key) (Races in bold indicate pole position; races in italics indicate fastest lap)

Year	Class	Team	Machine	1	2	3	4	5	6	7	8	9	10	11	12	13	14	15	Points	Rank	Wins
1984	250cc	Armstrong-Rotax	CF250	RSA -	NAT -	ESP -	AUT -	GER -	FRA -	YUG -	NED -	BEL -	GBR; 28	SWE; NC	RSM -				0	–	0
1985	250cc	Armstrong-Rotax	CF250	RSA; 24	ESP; NC	GER; NC	NAT; NC	AUT; 14	YUG; 16	NED; 14	BEL; NC	FRA; 14	GBR; NC	SWE; 10	RSM; NC				1	28th	0
1986	250cc	Armstrong-Rotax	CF250	ESP -	NAT -	GER -	AUT -	YUG -	NED; 12	BEL; 8	FRA; 21	GBR; 10	SWE; 11	RSM; NC					4	21st	0
1986	500cc	Skoal Bandit-Suzuki	RG500	ESP -	NAT -	GER -	AUT -	YUG -	NED -	BEL -	FRA -	GBR; 7	SWE; 7	RSM; 8					11	10th	0
1987	500cc	HB-Honda	NSR500	**JPN**; NC	ESP; 4	GER; 7	NAT; 10	AUT; 3	YUG -	NED; NC	FRA; 7	GBR; 5	SWE; 5	CZE; 5	RSM; 7	POR; 6	BRA; 8	ARG; 7	61	5th	0
1988	500cc	HB-Honda	NSR500	JPN; 4	USA; 3	ESP; 5	EXP; 7	NAT; 11	GER; 9	AUT; NC	NED; 5	BEL; 11	YUG; NC	FRA; NC	GBR; 4	SWE; 4	CZE; 6	BRA; 4	125	6th	0
1989	500cc	Marlboro Yamaha	YZR500	JPN; 6	AUS; NC	USA; 5	ESP; 3	NAT; DNS	GER; NC	AUT -	YUG; 12	NED; 8	BEL; 10	FRA; 7	GBR; 4	SWE; 4	CZE; 6	BRA; 9	103	7th	0
1990	250cc	Yamaha	TZ250	JPN; 13	USA; 14	ESP -	NAT -	GER -	AUT -	YUG -	NED -	BEL -	FRA -	GBR -	SWE -	CZE -	HUN -	AUS -	5	33rd	0
1990	500cc	Lucky Strike-Suzuki	RGV500	JPN -	USA -	ESP; 8	NAT; 5	GER; 3	AUT; 5	YUG; 3	NED; 5	BEL; 12	FRA; 6	GBR; 5	SWE; 5	CZE; 4	HUN; 7	AUS; 5	140	4th	0
1991	500cc	Sonauto-Yamaha	YZR500	JPN -	AUS -	USA -	ESP -	ITA -	GER -	AUT -	EUR -	NED -	FRA -	GBR; 7	RSM; 5	CZE -	VDM; 12	MAL; 6	34	17th	0
1992	500cc	Sonauto-Yamaha	YZR500	JPN; 7	AUS; NC	MAL; NC	ESP; 3	ITA; 9	EUR; 7	GER; NC	NED; 7	HUN; 14	FRA; 6	GBR; NC	BRA; 9	RSA; 8			37	11th	0
1993	500cc	Valvoline-Yamaha	ROC	AUS; 10	MAL; 8	JPN; 13	ESP; 7	AUT; 11	GER; 9	NED; 8	EUR; 6	RSM; 8	GBR; 3	CZE; NC	ITA; 9	USA; 8	FIM; 8		103	9th	0
1994	500cc	Slick 50 WCM-Yamaha	ROC	AUS; NC	MAL; 11	JPN; 19	ESP; 8	AUT; 9	GER; 8	NED; NC	ITA; 9	FRA; NC	GBR; 8	CZE; 9	USA; 10	ARG; 11	EUR; 8		69	10th	0
1995	250cc	Docshop Aprilia	RS250	AUS; NC	MAL; NC	JPN; NC	ESP; 11	GER; 14	ITA; NC	NED; 12	FRA; 19	GBR; 6	CZE; NC	BRA; 19	ARG; 11	EUR; NC			26	18th	0

=== British Superbike Championship ===
Year	Class	Bike	1		2		3		4		5		6		7		8		9		10		11		12		13		Pos	Pts
Year	Class	Bike	R1	R2	R1	R2	R1	R2	R1	R2	R1	R2	R1	R2	R1	R2	R1	R2	R1	R2	R1	R2	R1	R2	R1	R2	R1	R2	Pos	Pts
2001	BSB	Suzuki	DON	DON	SIL	SIL	SNE	SNE	OUL	OUL	BRH	BRH	THR	THR	OUL	OUL	KNO; 4	KNO; 5	CAD	CAD	BRH	BRH	MAL	MAL	ROC	ROC	DON	DON	20th	24
