= Brazilian motorcycle Grand Prix =

Brazilian Grand Prix

Grand Prix motorcycle racing
- Venue: Interlagos (1992); Goiânia (1987–1989, 2026–present)
- First race: 1987
- Most wins (rider): Luca Cadalora, Dominique Sarron (2)
- Most wins (manufacturer): Honda (5)

The Brazilian motorcycle Grand Prix is a motorcycling road racing event that is part of the Grand Prix motorcycle racing World Championship.

== History ==
The first official Brazilian Grand Prix was held in 1987 at the Autódromo Internacional de Goiânia. Two more races were hosted in the following years until the race was removed from the 1990 calendar due to organisational problems. The event was supposed to return in 1991 in the month of September, but was scrapped in August because of safety concerns of the circuit.

In 1992, the Brazilian GP returned after a two-year absence. Due to Bernie Ecclestone's increased involvement of grand prix motorcycle racing at this time, the selected venue to host the race was the Interlagos Circuit in São Paulo instead of the previously used circuit in Goiânia. The Interlagos circuit proved unpopular with riders and there were even talks of cancelling the event before due to the bumpy surface and unsafe conditions of the circuit itself. The race went on nonetheless and was won by Wayne Rainey. Other problems also troubled riders all weekend: Thursday practice was cancelled because of fuel supply problems, Friday practice was plagued by smog and Saturday practice also proved difficult thanks to rainfall. Reportedly, many racefans, team members and riders were either pickpocketed or robbed and the attendance at the circuit was low - only 8000 people showed up on raceday.

After a one-off appearance at Interlagos, racing at the country returned in 1995. However, this race was known as the Rio Grand Prix and ran until 2004.

On 19 August 2013, an announcement was made that the Brazilian Grand Prix would officially return at the Autódromo Internacional Nelson Piquet in Brasília from the 2014 season onwards, with the inaugural event scheduled for 28 September. In preparation for the return of MotoGP, major upgrades were planned for the circuit's facilities and the circuit itself was to receive a substantial reconfiguration in order to improve safety and make it suitable for hosting international events. The event organizers were however unable to secure funding to the complete the needed changes in time and the event was removed from the final calendar on 24 February 2014.

On 10 October 2019 it was announced that Brazil will officially going to host the Brazilian round from 2022 onwards, the organizers signing a five-year contract with MotoGP. This race is set to be held at the new Rio Motorpark. However, the Grand Prix is yet to be held as of 2023 and is not in the provisional calendar for 2024.

On 12 December 2024, it was announced that MotoGP will return to Autódromo Internacional Ayrton Senna in 2026 with signing 5-year contract.

== Official names and sponsors ==
- 1987–1989, 1992: GP Brasil (no official sponsor)
- 2026: Estrella Galicia 0,0 Grand Prix of Brazil

== Formerly used circuits ==
Autódromo Internacional Ayrton Senna, used from 1987 to 1989, and 2026.

Interlagos Circuit, used in 1992

== Winners ==
=== Multiple winners (riders) ===
# Wins	Rider	Wins	
# Wins	Rider	Category	Years won
2	(France) Dominique Sarron	250cc	1987, 1988
2	(Italy) Luca Cadalora	250cc	1989, 1992

=== Multiple winners (manufacturers) ===
# Wins	Manufacturer	Wins	
# Wins	Manufacturer	Category	Years won
5	(Japan) Honda	500cc	1987
5	(Japan) Honda	250cc	1987, 1988, 1992
5	(Japan) Honda	125cc	1992
3	(Japan) Yamaha	500cc	1988, 1992
3	(Japan) Yamaha	250cc	1989

=== By year ===
Year	Track	Moto3		Moto2		MotoGP		Report
Year	Track	Rider	Manufacturer	Rider	Manufacturer	Rider	Manufacturer	Report
2026	Goiânia	(Spain) Máximo Quiles	KTM	(Spain) Daniel Holgado	Kalex	(Italy) Marco Bezzecchi	Aprilia	Report

Year	Track	125cc		250cc		500cc		Report
Year	Track	Rider	Manufacturer	Rider	Manufacturer	Rider	Manufacturer	Report
1992	Interlagos	(Germany) Dirk Raudies	Honda	(Italy) Luca Cadalora	Honda	(United States) Wayne Rainey	Yamaha	Report

Year	Track	80cc		125cc		250cc		500cc		Report
Year	Track	Rider	Manufacturer	Rider	Manufacturer	Rider	Manufacturer	Rider	Manufacturer	Report
1989	Goiânia					(Italy) Luca Cadalora	Yamaha	(United States) Kevin Schwantz	Suzuki	Report
1988	Goiânia					(France) Dominique Sarron	Honda	(United States) Eddie Lawson	Yamaha	Report
1987	Goiânia					(France) Dominique Sarron	Honda	(Australia) Wayne Gardner	Honda	Report

== See also ==
- Rio de Janeiro motorcycle Grand Prix
