= 1989 Japanese motorcycle Grand Prix =

(Japan) 1989 Japanese Grand Prix
Race details
- Race 1 of 15 races in the 1989 Grand Prix motorcycle racing season
- Date: 26 March 1989
- Official name: Grand Prix of Japan
- Location: Suzuka Circuit
- Course: Permanent racing facility; 5.821 km (3.617 mi)

500cc
Pole position
- Rider: (Japan) Tadahiko Taira
- Time: 2:11.860
Fastest lap
- Rider: (United States) Kevin Schwantz
- Time: 2:11.800
Podium
- First: (United States) Kevin Schwantz
- Second: (United States) Wayne Rainey
- Third: (United States) Eddie Lawson

250cc
Pole position
- Rider: (United States) John Kocinski
- Time: 2:17.040
Fastest lap
- Rider: (United States) John Kocinski
- Time: 2:16.720
Podium
- First: (United States) John Kocinski
- Second: (Spain) Sito Pons
- Third: (Italy) Luca Cadalora

125cc
Pole position
- Rider: (Italy) Ezio Gianola
- Time: 2:26.980
Fastest lap
- Rider: (Italy) Ezio Gianola
- Time: 2:26.490
Podium
- First: (Italy) Ezio Gianola
- Second: (Japan) Hisashi Unemoto
- Third: (Japan) Koji Takada

The 1989 Japanese motorcycle Grand Prix was the first round of the 1989 Grand Prix motorcycle racing season. It took place on the weekend of 24 to 26 March 1989 at the Suzuka Circuit.

== 500 cc race report ==
Wayne Rainey gets the lead and opens a small gap in the first lap, with Kevin Schwantz moving into second to chase him down. Wayne Gardner and Freddie Spencer go off-track, but get back in the race, while Doohan has a mechanical and Pierfrancesco Chili crashes out.

Schwantz soon catches and passes Rainey at the chicane in a typical late-braking move that leaves Rainey without much room. Rainey, not wanting to let Schwantz through, almost hits Schwantz’ back wheel and loses a lot of time. Schwantz will repeat the chicane pass two more times. From about half-race on, Rainey and Schwantz get in an epic fight, seemingly incapable of wanting to let the other take the lead. Rainey is so committed to staying in front of Schwantz that he does a downhill wheelie on the approach to the hairpin; on this lap alone they swap the lead at least 5 times.

Last lap sees Rainey ahead on the straight, but Schwantz passes into Turn One and manages to hold the lead to the finish line. Crossing the line, Rainey’s arm-flailing betrays his fury, but he manages to extend a hand of congratulations as he comes alongside Schwantz on the cool-down lap. Lawson battles his way through a handful of riders to take 3rd.

Rainey says of the last lap: “I couldn’t see my pit board so I was watching the circuit’s own lap counter over the start line. That clicks down as the leaders go underneath it, but I didn’t realize that. I read L2. I was following Kevin and thinking: why’s he riding so wild when there’s still another lap left? He was being real aggressive, and I was sitting right on him, planning how the next lap I’d draught him on the back straight, then not let him pass me at the chicane. Then we came across the start-finish line and there was the checker. It really pissed me off. Towards the end of 1988 we’d started saying hello to one another. It wasn’t just the two of us anymore. Now our rivalry started to heat up again.”

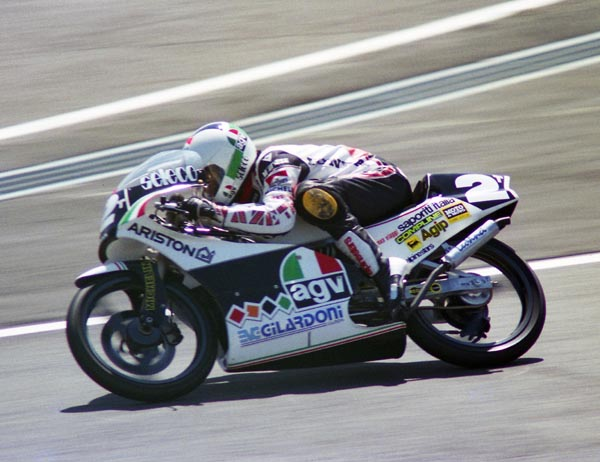
Ezio Gianola, riding his bike at the 125cc race, which he went on to win.

== 500 cc classification ==
Pos.	Rider	Team	Manufacturer	Laps	Time/Retired	Grid	Points
1	(United States) Kevin Schwantz	Suzuki Pepsi Cola	Suzuki	22	48:48.370	3	20
2	(United States) Wayne Rainey	Team Lucky Strike Roberts	Yamaha	22	+0.420	2	17
3	(United States) Eddie Lawson	Rothmans Kanemoto Honda	Honda	22	+30.670	10	15
4	(Australia) Wayne Gardner	Rothmans Honda Team	Honda	22	+35.190	4	13
5	(Australia) Kevin Magee	Team Lucky Strike Roberts	Yamaha	22	+36.420	5	11
6	(United Kingdom) Niall Mackenzie	Marlboro Yamaha Team Agostini	Yamaha	22	+39.540	8	10
7	(France) Christian Sarron	Sonauto Gauloises Blondes Yamaha Mobil 1	Yamaha	22	+48.470	11	9
8	(Japan) Tadahiko Taira	Yamaha Motor Company	Yamaha	22	+48.540	1	8
9	(Japan) Norihiko Fujiwara	Yamaha Motor Company	Yamaha	22	+1:09.280	16	7
10	(Japan) Shinichi Itoh	Team HRC	Honda	22	+1:09.280	12	6
11	(United States) Bubba Shobert	Cabin Racing Team	Honda	22	+1:18.990	14	5
12	(United Kingdom) Ron Haslam	Suzuki Pepsi Cola	Suzuki	22	+1:23.880	13	4
13	(Japan) Shunji Yatsushiro	Team HRC	Honda	22	+1:25.670	19	3
14	(United States) Freddie Spencer	Marlboro Yamaha Team Agostini	Yamaha	22	+1:26.000	9	2
15	(Japan) Kunio Machii	Yamaha Motor Company	Yamaha	22	+1:29.480	15	1
16	(United States) Randy Mamola	Cagiva Corse	Cagiva	22	+1:45.800	17	
17	(Japan) Takazumi Katayama		Yamaha	22	+1:46.240	22	
18	(France) Dominique Sarron	Team ROC Elf Honda	Honda	22	+2:12.130	23	
19	(Japan) Katunori Shinozaki		Suzuki	21	+1 Lap	26	
20	(Switzerland) Marco Gentile	Fior Marlboro	Fior	21	+1 Lap	27	
21	(Japan) Keiji Kinoshita		Honda	21	+1 Lap	28	
22	(Japan) Yoshimasa Matsumoto		Honda	20	+2 Laps	30	
23	(Spain) Francisco Gonzales	Club Motocross Pozuelo	Honda	20	+2 Laps	31	
Ret	(United States) Doug Polen		Suzuki		Retirement	20	
Ret	(Italy) Alessandro Valesi	Team Iberia	Yamaha		Retirement	24	
Ret	(Japan) Osamu Hiwatashi		Suzuki		Retirement	18	
Ret	(Japan) Hikaru Miyagi		Honda		Retirement	21	
Ret	(Japan) Norio Iobe		Honda		Retirement	25	
Ret	(Australia) Mick Doohan	Rothmans Honda Team	Honda		Retirement	6	
Ret	(Italy) Pierfrancesco Chili	HB Honda Gallina Team	Honda		Retirement	7	
DNS	(United Kingdom) Simon Buckmaster	Racing Team Katayama	Honda		Did not Start	29	

Previous race: 1988 Brazilian Grand Prix	FIM Grand Prix World Championship; 1989 season	Next race: 1989 Australian Grand Prix
Previous race: 1988 Japanese Grand Prix	Japanese Grand Prix	Next race: 1990 Japanese Grand Prix
