= 2026 Brazilian motorcycle Grand Prix =

Motorcycle races in Goiânia

(Brazil) 2026 Brazilian Grand Prix
Race details
- Race 2 of 22 races in the 2026 Grand Prix motorcycle racing season
- Date: 22 March 2026
- Official name: Estrella Galicia 0,0 Grand Prix of Brazil
- Location: Autódromo Internacional de Goiânia – Ayrton Senna; Goiânia, Brazil
- Course: Permanent racing facility; 3.835 km (2.383 mi)

MotoGP
Pole position
Rider	(Italy) Fabio Di Giannantonio	Ducati
Time	1:17.410	
Fastest lap
Rider	(Italy) Marco Bezzecchi	Aprilia
Time	1:18.654 on lap 11	
Podium
First	(Italy) Marco Bezzecchi	Aprilia
Second	(Spain) Jorge Martín	Aprilia
Third	(Italy) Fabio Di Giannantonio	Ducati

Moto2
Pole position
Rider	(Spain) Daniel Holgado	Kalex
Time	1:20.711	
Fastest lap
Rider	(Spain) Daniel Holgado	Kalex
Time	1:21.920 on lap 5	
Podium
First	(Spain) Daniel Holgado	Kalex
Second	(Spain) Daniel Muñoz	Kalex
Third	(Spain) Manuel González	Kalex

Moto3
Pole position
Rider	(Spain) Joel Esteban	KTM
Time	1:26.241	
Fastest lap
Rider	(Argentina) Marco Morelli	KTM
Time	1:26.252 on lap 2	
Podium
First	(Spain) Máximo Quiles	KTM
Second	(Argentina) Marco Morelli	KTM
Third	(Indonesia) Veda Pratama	Honda

The 2026 Brazilian motorcycle Grand Prix (officially known as the Estrella Galicia 0,0 Grand Prix of Brazil) was the second round of the 2026 Grand Prix motorcycle racing season. All races were held at the Autódromo Internacional de Goiânia – Ayrton Senna in Goiânia on 22 March 2026.

This event marked the return of the Brazilian Grand Prix to the MotoGP calendar for the first time since 1992, and the first time any race has been held in Brazilian soil since the 2004 Rio de Janeiro Grand Prix.

== Background ==
The circuit in Goiânia underwent renovations to meet FIM safety standards for the 2026 season. It replaces the previous attempts to host the race in Rio de Janeiro or Brasília.

== Qualifying ==
=== MotoGP ===
Fastest session lap

Pos.	No.	Rider	Team	Constructor	Q1	Q2	Final grid	Row
1	49	(Italy) Fabio Di Giannantonio	Pertamina Enduro VR46 Racing Team	Ducati	1:17.531	1:17.410	1	1
2	72	(Italy) Marco Bezzecchi	Aprilia Racing	Aprilia	1:17.408	1:17.480	2	1
3	93	(Spain) Marc Márquez	Ducati Lenovo Team	Ducati	Qualified to Q2	1:17.491	3	1
4	20	(France) Fabio Quartararo	Monster Energy Yamaha MotoGP Team	Yamaha	Qualified to Q2	1:17.561	4	2
5	89	(Spain) Jorge Martín	Aprilia Racing	Aprilia	Qualified to Q2	1:17.630	5	2
6	79	(Japan) Ai Ogura	Trackhouse MotoGP Team	Aprilia	Qualified to Q2	1:17.702	6	2
7	54	(Spain) Fermín Aldeguer	BK8 Gresini Racing MotoGP	Ducati	Qualified to Q2	1:17.715	7	3
8	73	(Spain) Álex Márquez	BK8 Gresini Racing MotoGP	Ducati	Qualified to Q2	1:17.799	8	3
9	37	(Spain) Pedro Acosta	Red Bull KTM Factory Racing	KTM	Qualified to Q2	1:18.034	9	3
10	5	(France) Johann Zarco	Castrol Honda LCR	Honda	Qualified to Q2	1:18.065	10	4
11	63	(Italy) Francesco Bagnaia	Ducati Lenovo Team	Ducati	Qualified to Q2	1:18.122	11	4
12	7	(Turkey) Toprak Razgatlıoğlu	Prima Pramac Yamaha MotoGP	Yamaha	Qualified to Q2	1:18.422	12	4
13	36	(Spain) Joan Mir	Honda HRC Castrol	Honda	1:17.710	N/A	13	5
14	11	(Brazil) Diogo Moreira	Pro Honda LCR	Honda	1:17.812	N/A	14	5
15	21	(Italy) Franco Morbidelli	Pertamina Enduro VR46 Racing Team	Ducati	1:17.815	N/A	15	5
16	25	(Spain) Raúl Fernández	Trackhouse MotoGP Team	Aprilia	1:17.964	N/A	16	6
17	42	(Spain) Álex Rins	Monster Energy Yamaha MotoGP Team	Yamaha	1:17.975	N/A	17	6
18	43	(Australia) Jack Miller	Prima Pramac Yamaha MotoGP	Yamaha	1:18.022	N/A	18	6
19	10	(Italy) Luca Marini	Honda HRC Castrol	Honda	1:18.169	N/A	19	7
20	12	(Spain) Maverick Viñales	Red Bull KTM Tech3	KTM	1:18.176	N/A	20	7
21	33	(South Africa) Brad Binder	Red Bull KTM Factory Racing	KTM	1:18.237	N/A	21	7
22	23	(Italy) Enea Bastianini	Red Bull KTM Tech3	KTM	1:18.479	N/A	22	8
Official MotoGP Qualifying 1 Report
Official MotoGP Qualifying 2 Report
Official MotoGP Grid Report

=== Moto2 ===
Fastest session lap

Pos.	No.	Rider	Team	Constructor	Q1	Q2	Final grid	Row
1	96	(Spain) Daniel Holgado	CFMoto Inde Aspar Team	Kalex	1:20.874	1:20.711	1	1
2	80	(Colombia) David Alonso	CFMoto Inde Aspar Team	Kalex	Qualified to Q2	1:20.728	2	1
3	11	(Spain) Álex Escrig	Klint Racing Team	Forward	Qualified to Q2	1:20.754	3	1
4	18	(Spain) Manuel González	Liqui Moly Dynavolt Intact GP	Kalex	Qualified to Q2	1:20.790	4	2
5	36	(Spain) Ángel Piqueras	QJMotor – Pont Grup – MSi	Kalex	Qualified to Q2	1:20.803	5	2
6	95	(Netherlands) Collin Veijer	Red Bull KTM Ajo	Kalex	Qualified to Q2	1:20.946	6	2
7	21	(Spain) Alonso López	Italjet Gresini Moto2	Kalex	Qualified to Q2	1:20.949	7	3
8	13	(Italy) Celestino Vietti	HDR SpeedRS Team	Boscoscuro	Qualified to Q2	1:20.970	8	3
9	64	(Indonesia) Mario Aji	Idemitsu Honda Team Asia	Kalex	Qualified to Q2	1:20.982	9	3
10	14	(Italy) Tony Arbolino	Reds Fantic Racing	Kalex	Qualified to Q2	1:21.025	10	4
11	17	(Spain) Daniel Muñoz	Italtrans Racing Team	Kalex	Qualified to Q2	1:21.058	11	4
12	4	(Spain) Iván Ortolá	QJMotor – Pont Grup – MSi	Kalex	Qualified to Q2	1:21.071	12	4
13	28	(Spain) Izan Guevara	Blu Cru Pramac Yamaha Moto2	Boscoscuro	Qualified to Q2	1:21.168	13	5
14	7	(Belgium) Barry Baltus	Reds Fantic Racing	Kalex	1:21.329	1:21.216	14	5
15	3	(Spain) Sergio García	Italjet Gresini Moto2	Kalex	1:21.473	1:21.269	15	5
16	16	(United States) Joe Roberts	OnlyFans American Racing Team	Kalex	1:21.153	1:21.298	16	6
17	12	(Czech Republic) Filip Salač	OnlyFans American Racing Team	Kalex	Qualified to Q2	1:21.327	17	6
18	53	(Turkey) Deniz Oncu	Elf Marc VDS Racing Team	Boscoscuro	Qualified to Q2	1:21.558	18	6
19	71	(Japan) Ayumu Sasaki	Momoven Idrofoglia RW Racing Team	Kalex	1:21.476	N/A	19	7
20	72	(Japan) Taiyo Furusato	Idemitsu Honda Team Asia	Kalex	1:21.494	N/A	20	7
21	99	(Spain) Adrián Huertas	Italtrans Racing Team	Kalex	1:21.508	N/A	21	7
22	84	(Netherlands) Zonta van den Goorbergh	Momoven Idrofoglia RW Racing Team	Kalex	1:21.565	N/A	22	8
23	8	(Italy) Dennis Foggia	HDR SpeedRS Team	Boscoscuro	1:21.652	N/A	23	8
24	54	(Spain) Alberto Ferrández	Blu Cru Pramac Yamaha Moto2	Boscoscuro	1:21.663	N/A	24	8
25	44	(Spain) Arón Canet	Elf Marc VDS Racing Team	Boscoscuro	1:21.686	N/A	25	9
26	9	(Spain) Jorge Navarro	Klint Racing Team	Forward	1:21.765	N/A	26	9
27	98	(Spain) José Antonio Rueda	Red Bull KTM Ajo	Kalex	1:21.976	N/A	27	9
28	81	(Australia) Senna Agius	Liqui Moly Dynavolt Intact GP	Kalex	1:22.049	N/A	28	10
Official Moto2 Qualifying 1 Report
Official Moto2 Qualifying 2 Report
Official Moto2 Grid Report

=== Moto3 ===
Fastest session lap

Pos.	No.	Rider	Team	Constructor	Q1	Q2	Final grid	Row
1	78	(Spain) Joel Esteban	LevelUp – MTA	KTM	Qualified to Q2	1:26.241	1	1
2	73	(Argentina) Valentín Perrone	Red Bull KTM Tech3	KTM	Qualified to Q2	1:26.447	2	1
3	13	(Malaysia) Hakim Danish	Aeon Credit – MT Helmets – MSi	KTM	Qualified to Q2	1:26.448	3	1
4	9	(Indonesia) Veda Pratama	Honda Team Asia	Honda	Qualified to Q2	1:26.506	4	2
5	97	(Argentina) Marco Morelli	CFMoto Gaviota Aspar Team	KTM	Qualified to Q2	1:26.560	5	2
6	51	(Spain) Brian Uriarte	Red Bull KTM Ajo	KTM	Qualified to Q2	1:26.835	6	2
7	66	(Australia) Joel Kelso	Gryd – MLav Racing	Honda	Qualified to Q2	1:26.967	7	3
8	6	(Japan) Ryusei Yamanaka	Aeon Credit – MT Helmets – MSi	KTM	1:27.379	1:26.970	8	3
9	27	(Finland) Rico Salmela	Red Bull KTM Tech3	KTM	Qualified to Q2	1:26.990	9	3
10	83	(Spain) Álvaro Carpe	Red Bull KTM Ajo	KTM	1:27.070	1:27.000	10	4
11	28	(Spain) Máximo Quiles	CFMoto Gaviota Aspar Team	KTM	Qualified to Q2	1:27.013	11	4
12	31	(Spain) Adrián Fernández	Leopard Racing	Honda	1:27.373	1:27.036	12	4
13	67	(Republic of Ireland) Casey O'Gorman	Sic58 Squadra Corse	Honda	Qualified to Q2	1:27.041	13	5
14	22	(Spain) David Almansa	Liqui Moly Dynavolt Intact GP	KTM	Qualified to Q2	1:27.044	14	5
15	32	(Japan) Zen Mitani	Honda Team Asia	Honda	1:27.405	1:27.061	15	5
16	94	(Italy) Guido Pini	Leopard Racing	Honda	Qualified to Q2	1:27.171	16	6
17	5	(Austria) Leo Rammerstorfer	Sic58 Squadra Corse	Honda	Qualified to Q2	1:28.131	17	6
18	14	(New Zealand) Cormac Buchanan	Code Motorsports	KTM	Qualified to Q2	1:28.502	18	6
19	19	(United Kingdom) Scott Ogden	CIP Green Power	KTM	1:27.416	N/A	19	7
20	18	(Italy) Matteo Bertelle	LevelUp – MTA	KTM	1:27.502	N/A	20	7
21	21	(South Africa) Ruché Moodley	Code Motorsports	KTM	1:27.562	N/A	21	7
22	8	(United Kingdom) Eddie O'Shea	Gryd – MLav Racing	Honda	1:27.762	N/A	22	8
23	10	(Italy) Nicola Carraro	Rivacold Snipers Team	Honda	1:27.798	N/A	23	8
24	54	(Spain) Jesús Ríos	Rivacold Snipers Team	Honda	1:27.811	N/A	24	8
25	11	(Spain) Adrián Cruces	CIP Green Power	KTM	1:28.825	N/A	25	9
Official Moto3 Qualifying 1 Report
Official Moto3 Qualifying 2 Report
Official Moto3 Grid Report

== MotoGP Sprint ==
The MotoGP Sprint was held on 21 March 2026.

Pos.	No.	Rider	Team	Manufacturer	Laps	Time/Retired	Grid	Points
1	93	(Spain) Marc Márquez	Ducati Lenovo Team	Ducati	15	19:41.982	3	12
2	49	(Italy) Fabio Di Giannantonio	Pertamina Enduro VR46 Racing Team	Ducati	15	+0.213	1	9
3	89	(Spain) Jorge Martín	Aprilia Racing	Aprilia	15	+3.587	5	7
4	72	(Italy) Marco Bezzecchi	Aprilia Racing	Aprilia	15	+4.061	2	6
5	79	(Japan) Ai Ogura	Trackhouse MotoGP Team	Aprilia	15	+4.994	6	5
6	20	(France) Fabio Quartararo	Monster Energy Yamaha MotoGP Team	Yamaha	15	+7.728	4	4
7	73	(Spain) Álex Márquez	BK8 Gresini Racing MotoGP	Ducati	15	+8.153	8	3
8	63	(Italy) Francesco Bagnaia	Ducati Lenovo Team	Ducati	15	+8.342	11	2
9	37	(Spain) Pedro Acosta	Red Bull KTM Factory Racing	KTM	15	+9.096	9	1
10	11	(Brazil) Diogo Moreira	Pro Honda LCR	Honda	15	+10.329	14	
11	10	(Italy) Luca Marini	Honda HRC Castrol	Honda	15	+11.106	19	
12	25	(Spain) Raúl Fernández	Trackhouse MotoGP Team	Aprilia	15	+14.213	16	
13	42	(Spain) Álex Rins	Monster Energy Yamaha MotoGP Team	Yamaha	15	+15.090	17	
14	54	(Spain) Fermín Aldeguer	BK8 Gresini Racing MotoGP	Ducati	15	+15.353	7	
15	33	(South Africa) Brad Binder	Red Bull KTM Factory Racing	KTM	15	+15.528	21	
16	21	(Italy) Franco Morbidelli	Pertamina Enduro VR46 Racing Team	Ducati	15	+21.396	15	
17	23	(Italy) Enea Bastianini	Red Bull KTM Tech3	KTM	15	+22.706	22	
18	7	(Turkey) Toprak Razgatlıoğlu	Prima Pramac Yamaha MotoGP	Yamaha	15	+23.044	12	
19	43	(Australia) Jack Miller	Prima Pramac Yamaha MotoGP	Yamaha	15	+23.807	18	
Ret	12	(Spain) Maverick Viñales	Red Bull KTM Tech3	KTM	10	Accident	20	
Ret	5	(France) Johann Zarco	Castrol Honda LCR	Honda	7	Accident	10	
Ret	36	(Spain) Joan Mir	Honda HRC Castrol	Honda	1	Accident	13	
Fastest sprint lap: (Spain) Marc Márquez (Ducati) – 1:18.136 (lap 6)
Official MotoGP Sprint Report

== Race ==
=== MotoGP ===
The race was originally scheduled to run a total of 31 laps, but was reduced to 23 laps in a last-minute decision due to an asphalt surface break-up in turns 11 and 12.

Pos.	No.	Rider	Team	Manufacturer	Laps	Time/Retired	Grid	Points
1	72	(Italy) Marco Bezzecchi	Aprilia Racing	Aprilia	23	30:19.760	2	25
2	89	(Spain) Jorge Martín	Aprilia Racing	Aprilia	23	+3.231	5	20
3	49	(Italy) Fabio Di Giannantonio	Pertamina Enduro VR46 Racing Team	Ducati	23	+3.780	1	16
4	93	(Spain) Marc Márquez	Ducati Lenovo Team	Ducati	23	+4.089	3	13
5	79	(Japan) Ai Ogura	Trackhouse MotoGP Team	Aprilia	23	+8.403	6	11
6	73	(Spain) Álex Márquez	BK8 Gresini Racing MotoGP	Ducati	23	+8.918	8	10
7	37	(Spain) Pedro Acosta	Red Bull KTM Factory Racing	KTM	23	+10.687	9	9
8	54	(Spain) Fermín Aldeguer	BK8 Gresini Racing MotoGP	Ducati	23	+11.359	7	8
9	5	(France) Johann Zarco	Castrol Honda LCR	Honda	23	+12.907	10	7
10	25	(Spain) Raúl Fernández	Trackhouse MotoGP Team	Aprilia	23	+16.370	16	6
11	10	(Italy) Luca Marini	Honda HRC Castrol	Honda	23	+18.529	19	5
12	21	(Italy) Franco Morbidelli	Pertamina Enduro VR46 Racing Team	Ducati	23	+19.980	15	4
13	11	(Brazil) Diogo Moreira	Pro Honda LCR	Honda	23	+21.322	14	3
14	42	(Spain) Álex Rins	Monster Energy Yamaha MotoGP Team	Yamaha	23	+22.699	17	2
15	23	(Italy) Enea Bastianini	Red Bull KTM Tech3	KTM	23	+23.840	22	1
16	20	(France) Fabio Quartararo	Monster Energy Yamaha MotoGP Team	Yamaha	23	+26.403	4	
17	7	(Turkey) Toprak Razgatlıoğlu	Prima Pramac Yamaha MotoGP	Yamaha	23	+30.287	12	
18	12	(Spain) Maverick Viñales	Red Bull KTM Tech3	KTM	23	+36.397	20	
Ret	36	(Spain) Joan Mir	Honda HRC Castrol	Honda	10	Accident	13	
Ret	63	(Italy) Francesco Bagnaia	Ducati Lenovo Team	Ducati	10	Accident	11	
Ret	33	(South Africa) Brad Binder	Red Bull KTM Factory Racing	KTM	3	Accident	21	
Ret	43	(Australia) Jack Miller	Prima Pramac Yamaha MotoGP	Yamaha	1	Accident	18	
Fastest lap: (Italy) Marco Bezzecchi (Aprilia) – 1:18.654 (lap 11)
Official MotoGP Race Report

=== Moto2 ===
Pos.	No.	Rider	Team	Manufacturer	Laps	Time/Retired	Grid	Points
1	96	(Spain) Daniel Holgado	CFMoto Inde Aspar Team	Kalex	26	35:46.382	1	25
2	17	(Spain) Daniel Muñoz	Italtrans Racing Team	Kalex	26	+1.226	11	20
3	18	(Spain) Manuel González	Liqui Moly Dynavolt Intact GP	Kalex	26	+3.916	3	16
4	11	(Spain) Álex Escrig	Klint Racing Team	Forward	26	+4.497	3	13
5	80	(Colombia) David Alonso	CFMoto Inde Aspar Team	Kalex	26	+8.652	2	11
6	28	(Spain) Izan Guevara	Blu Cru Pramac Yamaha Moto2	Boscoscuro	26	+8.778	13	10
7	14	(Italy) Tony Arbolino	Red Fantic Racing	Kalex	26	+9.683	10	9
8	95	(Netherlands) Collin Veijer	Red Bull KTM Ajo	Kalex	26	+11.198	6	8
9	13	(Italy) Celestino Vietti	HDR SpeedRS Team	Boscoscuro	26	+11.890	8	7
10	4	(Spain) Iván Ortolá	QJMotor – Pont Grup – MSi	Kalex	26	+12.718	12	6
11	21	(Spain) Alonso López	Italjet Gresini Moto2	Kalex	26	+16.218	7	5
12	99	(Spain) Adrián Huertas	Italtrans Racing Team	Kalex	26	+18.439	21	4
13	64	(Indonesia) Mario Aji	Idemitsu Honda Team Asia	Kalex	26	+18.932	9	3
14	7	(Belgium) Barry Baltus	Red Fantic Racing	Kalex	26	+19.696	14	2
15	12	(Czech Republic) Filip Salač	OnlyFans American Racing Team	Kalex	26	+19.697	17	1
16	3	(Spain) Sergio García	Italjet Gresini Moto2	Kalex	26	+20.722	15	
17	54	(Spain) Alberto Ferrández	Blu Cru Pramac Yamaha Moto2	Boscoscuro	26	+24.717	24	
18	16	(United States) Joe Roberts	OnlyFans American Racing Team	Kalex	26	+24.880	16	
19	81	(Australia) Senna Agius	Liqui Moly Dynavolt Intact GP	Kalex	26	+27.250	28	
20	53	(Turkey) Deniz Öncü	Elf Marc VDS Racing Team	Boscoscuro	26	+28.303	18	
21	98	(Spain) José Antonio Rueda	Red Bull KTM Ajo	Kalex	26	+31.633	27	
22	44	(Spain) Arón Canet	Elf Marc VDS Racing Team	Boscoscuro	26	+33.355	25	
23	8	(Italy) Dennis Foggia	HDR SpeedRS Team	Boscoscuro	26	+38.931	23	
24	84	(Netherlands) Zonta van den Goorbergh	Momoven Idrofoglia RW Racing Team	Kalex	26	+40.307	22	
Ret	72	(Japan) Taiyo Furusato	Idemitsu Honda Team Asia	Kalex	18	Accident	20	
Ret	36	(Spain) Ángel Piqueras	QJMotor – Pont Grup – MSi	Kalex	6	Accident	5	
Ret	9	(Spain) Jorge Navarro	Klint Racing Team	Forward	3	Accident	26	
DNS	71	(Japan) Ayumu Sasaki	Momoven Idrofoglia RW Racing Team	Kalex	0	Technical	20	
Fastest lap: (Spain) Daniel Holgado (Kalex) – 1:21.920 (lap 5)
Official Moto2 Race Report

=== Moto3 ===
The race was scheduled to contest 24 laps, but was red-flagged on lap 14 following a crash from Scott Ogden. As less than two-thirds of the race distance had been completed at the time of the red flag, it was restarted and reduced to 5 laps.

Pos.	No.	Rider	Team	Manufacturer	Laps	Time/Retired	Grid	Points
1	28	(Spain) Máximo Quiles	CFMoto Gaviota Aspar Team	KTM	5	7:19.821	11	25
2	97	(Argentina) Marco Morelli	CFMoto Gaviota Aspar Team	KTM	5	+0.143	5	20
3	9	(Indonesia) Veda Pratama	Honda Team Asia	Honda	5	+1.650	4	16
4	83	(Spain) Álvaro Carpe	Red Bull KTM Ajo	KTM	5	+1.741	10	13
5	94	(Italy) Guido Pini	Leopard Racing	Honda	5	+1.786	16	11
6	27	(Finland) Rico Salmela	Red Bull KTM Tech3	KTM	5	+1.842	9	10
7	73	(Argentina) Valentín Perrone	Red Bull KTM Tech3	KTM	5	+1.949	2	9
8	31	(Spain) Adrián Fernández (Note: Originally finished eighth but was disqualified from the first six races of the season for engine tampering. However, his team Leopard Racing appealed the disqualification and won the appeal verdict, thus reinstating his results in the first six races.)	Leopard Racing	Honda	5	+2.522	12	8
9	67	(Republic of Ireland) Casey O'Gorman	Sic58 Squadra Corse	Honda	5	+2.894	13	7
10	13	(Malaysia) Hakim Danish	Aeon Credit – MT Helmets – MSi	KTM	5	+3.083	3	6
11	51	(Spain) Brian Uriarte	Red Bull KTM Ajo	KTM	5	+3.158	6	5
12	66	(Australia) Joel Kelso	Gryd – MLav Racing	Honda	5	+3.791	7	4
13	11	(Spain) Adrián Cruces	CIP Green Power	KTM	5	+4.001	25	3
14	6	(Japan) Ryusei Yamanaka	Aeon Credit – MT Helmets – MSi	KTM	5	+4.374	8	2
15	8	(United Kingdom) Eddie O'Shea	Gryd – MLav Racing	Honda	5	+4.750	22	1
16	32	(Japan) Zen Mitani	Honda Team Asia	Honda	5	+6.438	15	
17	10	(Italy) Nicola Carraro	Rivacold Snipers Team	Honda	5	+6.595	23	
18	14	(New Zealand) Cormac Buchanan	Code Motorsports	KTM	5	+12.823	18	
Ret	21	(South Africa) Ruché Moodley	Code Motorsports	KTM	2	Technical	21	
Ret	18	(Italy) Matteo Bertelle	LevelUp – MTA	KTM	0	Accident	20	
Ret	54	(Spain) Jesús Ríos	Rivacold Snipers Team	Honda	0	Accident	24	
Ret	19	(United Kingdom) Scott Ogden	CIP Green Power	KTM	0	Did not restart	19	
Ret	22	(Spain) David Almansa	Liqui Moly Dynavolt Intact GP	KTM	0	Did not restart	14	
Ret	78	(Spain) Joel Esteban	LevelUp – MTA	KTM	0	Did not restart	1	
Ret	5	(Austria) Leo Rammerstorfer	Sic58 Squadra Corse	Honda	0	Did not restart	17	
Fastest lap: (Argentina) Marco Morelli (KTM) – 1:26.252 (lap 2)
Official Moto3 Race Report

== Championship standings after the race ==
Below are the standings for the top five riders, constructors, and teams after the round.

=== MotoGP ===
Riders' Championship standings

	Pos.	Rider	Points
1	1	(Italy) Marco Bezzecchi	56
2	2	(Spain) Jorge Martín	45
2	3	(Spain) Pedro Acosta	42
3	4	(Italy) Fabio Di Giannantonio	37
3	5	(Spain) Marc Márquez	34

Constructors' Championship standings

	Pos.	Constructor	Points
	1	(Italy) Aprilia	64
1	2	(Italy) Ducati	47
1	3	(Austria) KTM	42
	4	(Japan) Honda	16
	5	(Japan) Yamaha	8

Teams' Championship standings

	Pos.	Team	Points
1	1	(Italy) Aprilia Racing	101
1	2	(United States) Trackhouse MotoGP Team	62
2	3	(Austria) Red Bull KTM Factory Racing	55
	4	(Italy) Pertamina Enduro VR46 Racing Team	49
	5	(Italy) Ducati Lenovo Team	44

=== Moto2 ===
Riders' Championship standings

	Pos.	Rider	Points
2	1	(Spain) Daniel Holgado	33
1	2	(Spain) Manuel González	28.5
3	3	(Spain) Daniel Muñoz	24
2	4	(Spain) Izan Guevara	20
7	5	(Spain) Álex Escrig	15

Constructors' Championship standings

Pos.	Constructor	Points
1	(Germany) Kalex	37.5
2	(Italy) Boscoscuro	20
3	(Switzerland) Forward	15

Teams' Championship standings

	Pos.	Team	Points
2	1	(Spain) CFMoto Inde Aspar Team	44
1	2	(Germany) Liqui Moly Dynavolt Intact GP	28.5
6	3	(Italy) Italtrans Racing Team	28
2	4	(Italy) Blu Cru Pramac Yamaha Moto2	20.5
7	5	(Switzerland) Klint Racing Team	15

=== Moto3 ===
Riders' Championship standings

	Pos.	Rider	Points
1	1	(Spain) Máximo Quiles	45
6	2	(Argentina) Marco Morelli	28
2	3	(Indonesia) Veda Pratama	27
	4	(Spain) Álvaro Carpe	26
4	5	(Spain) David Almansa	25

Constructors' Championship standings

Pos.	Constructor	Points
1	(Austria) KTM	50
2	(Japan) Honda	27

Teams' Championship standings

	Pos.	Team	Points
1	1	(Spain) CFMoto Gaviota Aspar Team	73
1	2	(Finland) Red Bull KTM Ajo	40
1	3	(France) Red Bull KTM Tech3	35
3	4	(Germany) Liqui Moly Dynavolt Intact GP	31
1	5	(Luxembourg) Leopard Racing	29

== Notes ==
Previous race: 2026 Thailand Grand Prix	FIM Grand Prix World Championship; 2026 season	Next race: 2026 United States Grand Prix
Previous race: 1992 Brazilian Grand Prix	Brazilian motorcycle Grand Prix	Next race: 2027 Brazilian Grand Prix
