= 1988 Brazilian motorcycle Grand Prix =

(Brazil) 1988 Brazilian Grand Prix
Race details
- Race 15 of 15 races in the 1988 Grand Prix motorcycle racing season
- Date: 17 September 1988
- Location: Autódromo Internacional de Goiânia
- Course: Permanent racing facility; 3.835 km (2.383 mi)

500cc
Pole position
Rider	(Australia) Wayne Gardner	Honda
Time	1:26.930	
Fastest lap
Rider	(United States) Eddie Lawson	Yamaha
Time	1:27.810	
Podium
First	(United States) Eddie Lawson	Yamaha
Second	(Australia) Wayne Gardner	Honda
Third	(United States) Kevin Schwantz	Suzuki

250cc
Pole position
Rider	(France) Dominique Sarron	Honda
Time	1:29.200	
Fastest lap
Rider	(Italy) Luca Cadalora	Yamaha
Time	1:30.090	
Podium
First	(France) Dominique Sarron	Honda
Second	(Venezuela) Carlos Lavado	Yamaha
Third	(Spain) Sito Pons	Honda

The 1988 Brazilian motorcycle Grand Prix was the last round of the 1988 Grand Prix motorcycle racing season. It took place on the weekend of 15–17 September 1988 at the Goiânia circuit.

== 500 cc race report ==
Wayne Gardner was on pole, but Eddie Lawson got into the lead at the start, ahead of Wayne Rainey and Kevin Schwantz. Back in 6th place, Gardner was almost cut off by Pierfrancesco Chili, who tried a block pass on him; Gardner shook a fist.

Schwantz got around Lawson for 1st, but Lawson looked like he's not going to let it go. Gardner caught up to make it a trio, while Lawson retook the lead. Randy Mamola was hot-dogging, deliberately sliding the rear. Schwantz and Gardner went at it for 2nd place. Mamola almost highsided trying to impress the crowd, a bit later on a left-hander he looked over his shoulder and immediately slid the bike into a highside. Schwantz will do something similar next year at Phillip Island. Rainey retired with a punctured tire.

== 500cc classification ==
Pos.	Rider	Team	Manufacturer	Time/Retired	Points
1	(United States) Eddie Lawson	Marlboro Yamaha Team Agostini	Yamaha	47:22.550	20
2	(Australia) Wayne Gardner	Rothmans Honda Team	Honda	+13.360	17
3	(United States) Kevin Schwantz	Suzuki Pepsi Cola	Suzuki	+21.350	15
4	(United Kingdom) Niall Mackenzie	Team HRC	Honda	+24.120	13
5	(France) Christian Sarron	Sonauto Gauloises Blondes Yamaha Mobil 1	Yamaha	+24.240	11
6	(Australia) Kevin Magee	Team Lucky Strike Roberts	Yamaha	+24.280	10
7	(Italy) Pierfrancesco Chili	HB Honda Gallina Team	Honda	+1:13.100	9
8	(United Kingdom) Rob McElnea	Suzuki Pepsi Cola	Suzuki	+1:14.950	8
9	(Belgium) Didier de Radiguès	Marlboro Yamaha Team Agostini	Yamaha	+1:23.300	7
10	(France) Patrick Igoa	Sonauto Gauloises Blondes Yamaha Mobil 1	Yamaha	+1 Lap	6
11	(San Marino) Fabio Barchitta	Racing Team Katayama	Honda	+1 Lap	5
12	(Spain) Francisco Gonzales		Honda	+1 Lap	4
13	(United Kingdom) Donnie McLeod	Racing Team Katayama	Honda	+1 Lap	3
Ret	(United States) Wayne Rainey	Team Lucky Strike Roberts	Yamaha	Retirement	
Ret	(Switzerland) Marco Gentile	Fior Marlboro	Fior	Retirement	
Ret	(United Kingdom) Ron Haslam	Team ROC Elf Honda	Elf Honda	Retirement	
Ret	(Switzerland) Bruno Kneubühler	Romer Racing Suisse	Honda	Retirement	
Ret	(Italy) Alessandro Valesi	Team Iberia	Honda	Retirement	
Ret	(United States) Randy Mamola	Cagiva Corse	Cagiva	Retirement	
Ret	(United Kingdom) Roger Burnett	Racing Team Katayama	Honda	Retirement	

Previous race: 1988 Czechoslovak Grand Prix	FIM Grand Prix World Championship; 1988 season	Next race: 1989 Japanese Grand Prix
Previous race: 1987 Brazilian Grand Prix	Brazilian Grand Prix	Next race: 1989 Brazilian Grand Prix
