= 1989 Brazilian motorcycle Grand Prix =

(Brazil) 1989 Brazilian Grand Prix
Race details
- Race 15 of 15 races in the 1989 Grand Prix motorcycle racing season
- Date: 17 September 1989
- Official name: Grande Prémio do Brasil
- Location: Autódromo Internacional de Goiânia
- Course: Permanent racing facility; 3.835 km (2.383 mi)

500cc
Pole position
- Rider: (United States) Wayne Rainey
- Time: 1:25.440
Fastest lap
- Rider: (United States) Eddie Lawson
- Time: 1:26.980
Podium
- First: (United States) Kevin Schwantz
- Second: (United States) Eddie Lawson
- Third: (United States) Wayne Rainey

250cc
Pole position
- Rider: (Italy) Loris Reggiani
- Time: 1:28.980
Fastest lap
- Rider: (Italy) Luca Cadalora
- Time: 1:29.260
Podium
- First: (Italy) Luca Cadalora
- Second: (Japan) Masahiro Shimizu
- Third: (Italy) Loris Reggiani

The 1989 Brazilian motorcycle Grand Prix was the last round of the 1989 Grand Prix motorcycle racing season. It took place on the weekend of 15–17 September 1989 at the Goiânia circuit.

== 500 cc race report ==
Wayne Rainey has to win and Eddie Lawson has to finish outside the top 11 in order for Lawson to lose the championship. Reflecting on the mistake in Sweden that turned the championship around, Rainey says: “It’s really hard to tell you what I feel like. I just feel like I’ve been beat up by everybody in the world, and I just feel so down and disappointed in myself. I just felt I really let myself down and my team. You know, it makes you feel like crap.”

Though he can phone in the race and still win the championship, Lawson gets the start and the first apex, followed by Kevin Schwantz and Rainey. Rainey passes Schwantz, who nearly highsides in third spot. The track surface is slippery, and Mick Doohan shows it by doing a big rear-end slide.

Schwantz passes Rainey, but it almost doesn't stick, as Rainey tries to deny him the pass and they almost touch. Lawson is getting a small gap in the lead.

Going through dense backmarker traffic, Schwantz catches Lawson. Both bikes are squirming and bucking under acceleration. In Lawson's draft on the straight, Schwantz pops out and passes on the brakes. Schwantz shows he can slide with the best of them as he gets the back-end spinning on the exits.

Schwantz manages to put a #32 between him and Lawson. Vince Cascino, perhaps trying to match Schwantz’ pace, crashes right in front of Lawson, who manages to avoid the bike and rider but the distraction costs him some tenths.

Last lap, Schwantz wins with a gap between him and Lawson, and Rainey takes third.

== 500 cc classification ==
Pos.	Rider	Team	Manufacturer	Laps	Time/Retired	Points
1	(United States) Kevin Schwantz	Suzuki Pepsi Cola	Suzuki	32	46:44.390	20
2	(United States) Eddie Lawson	Rothmans Kanemoto Honda	Honda	32	+1.710	17
3	(United States) Wayne Rainey	Team Lucky Strike Roberts	Yamaha	32	+11.220	15
4	(Australia) Mick Doohan	Rothmans Honda Team	Honda	32	+19.120	13
5	(United Kingdom) Ron Haslam	Suzuki Pepsi Cola	Suzuki	32	+24.250	11
6	(Australia) Kevin Magee	Team Lucky Strike Roberts	Yamaha	32	+33.420	10
7	(Australia) Wayne Gardner	Rothmans Honda Team	Honda	32	+33.630	9
8	(France) Christian Sarron	Sonauto Gauloises Blondes Yamaha Mobil 1	Yamaha	32	+38.610	8
9	(United Kingdom) Niall Mackenzie	Marlboro Yamaha Team Agostini	Yamaha	32	+1:06.640	7
10	(France) Adrien Morillas	Team ROC Elf Honda	Honda	32	+1:10.020	6
11	(United States) Randy Mamola	Cagiva Corse	Cagiva	32	+1:11.650	5
12	(United Kingdom) Rob McElnea	Cabin Racing Team	Honda	32	+1:12.430	4
13	(Italy) Alessandro Valesi	Team Iberia	Yamaha	31	+1 Lap	3
14	(United Kingdom) Simon Buckmaster	Racing Team Katayama	Honda	31	+1 Lap	2
15	(Spain) Juan Lopez Mella	Club Motocross Pozuelo	Honda	30	+2 Laps	1
16	(Spain) Francisco Gonzales	Club Motocross Pozuelo	Honda	29	+3 Laps	
17	(Switzerland) Nicholas Schmassman	FMS	Honda	29	+3 Laps	
Ret	(Italy) Vincenzo Cascino		Suzuki		Retirement	
Ret	(France) Dominique Sarron	Team ROC Elf Honda	Honda		Retirement	
Ret	(Italy) Pierfrancesco Chili	HB Honda Gallina Team	Honda		Retirement	
DNS	(Switzerland) Marco Gentile	Fior Marlboro	Fior		Did not start	
DNS	(United Kingdom) Peter Graves		Honda		Did not start	

Previous race: 1989 Czechoslovak Grand Prix	FIM Grand Prix World Championship; 1989 season	Next race: 1990 Japanese Grand Prix
Previous race: 1988 Brazilian Grand Prix	Brazilian Grand Prix	Next race: 1992 Brazilian Grand Prix
