= 1992 Brazilian motorcycle Grand Prix =

(Brazil) 1992 Brazilian Grand Prix
Race details
- Race 12 of 13 races in the 1992 Grand Prix motorcycle racing season
- Date: 23 August 1992
- Official name: Grande Premio do Brasil
- Location: Autódromo José Carlos Pace
- Course: Permanent racing facility; 4.352 km (2.704 mi)

500cc
Pole position
- Rider: (United States) John Kocinski
- Time: 1:43.403
Fastest lap
- Rider: (United States) Wayne Rainey
- Time: 1:42.872
Podium
- First: (United States) Wayne Rainey
- Second: (United States) John Kocinski
- Third: (United States) Doug Chandler

250cc
Pole position
- Rider: (Italy) Max Biaggi
- Time: 1:55.227
Fastest lap
- Rider: (Italy) Loris Reggiani
- Time: 1:44.478
Podium
- First: (Italy) Luca Cadalora
- Second: (Italy) Max Biaggi
- Third: (Italy) Loris Reggiani

125cc
Pole position
- Rider: (Japan) Kazuto Sakata
- Time: 1:55.715
Fastest lap
- Rider: (Germany) Dirk Raudies
- Time: 1:50.262
Podium
- First: (Germany) Dirk Raudies
- Second: (Spain) Jorge Martínez
- Third: (Italy) Alessandro Gramigni

The 1992 Brazilian motorcycle Grand Prix was the penultimate round of the 1992 Grand Prix motorcycle racing season. It took place on the weekend of 21–23 August 1992 at Interlagos.

== 500 cc race report ==
Riders were concerned about the track surface and bumpiness; with Michael Scott, Wayne Rainey, Eddie Lawson and Mick Doohan all against racing (which would have decided the championship for Doohan), but the race went on anyway.

John Kocinski took pole ahead of Rainey, Wayne Gardner and Kevin Schwantz. Doohan, returning from his crash in the TT Assen earlier in the year, qualified 14th.

Rainey took the lead from Kocinski and Schwantz, and built a gap from the close pack of Kocinski, Schwantz and Doug Chandler.

Kocinski eventually pulled a late-braking pass to move from 4th to 2nd, overtaking Chandler and Schwantz.

Rainey eventually won the race by over 13 seconds, closing his 20 point deficit to Doohan in the Riders' standings from 22 points to 2 points; helped by Doohan's non-points finish in 12th.

== 500cc classification ==
Pos.	Rider	Team	Manufacturer	Time/Retired	Points
1	(United States) Wayne Rainey	Marlboro Team Roberts	Yamaha	48:33.539	20
2	(United States) John Kocinski	Marlboro Team Roberts	Yamaha	+13.000	15
3	(United States) Doug Chandler	Lucky Strike Suzuki	Suzuki	+20.750	12
4	(Australia) Wayne Gardner	Rothmans Kanemoto Honda	Honda	+28.880	10
5	(Canada) Miguel Duhamel	Yamaha Motor Banco	Yamaha	+31.260	8
6	(Spain) Àlex Crivillé	Campsa Honda Team	Honda	+31.210	6
7	(United States) Kevin Schwantz	Lucky Strike Suzuki	Suzuki	+50.400	4
8	(Brazil) Alex Barros	Cagiva Team Agostini	Cagiva	+53.520	3
9	(United Kingdom) Niall Mackenzie	Yamaha Motor Banco	Yamaha	+1:02.280	2
10	(United States) Randy Mamola	Budweiser Team/Global Motorsports	Yamaha	+1:10.960	1
11	(United States) Eddie Lawson	Cagiva Team Agostini	Cagiva	+1:20.830	
12	(Australia) Mick Doohan	Rothmans Honda Team	Honda	+1:31.570	
13	(France) Dominique Sarron	Team ROC Banco	ROC Yamaha	+1 Lap	
14	(Japan) Toshiyuki Arakaki	Team ROC Banco	ROC Yamaha	+1 Lap	
15	(Germany) Michael Rudroff	Rallye Sport	Harris Yamaha	+1 Lap	
16	(United Kingdom) Kevin Mitchell	MBM Racing	Harris Yamaha	+1 Lap	
17	(Italy) Marco Papa	Librenti Corse	Cagiva	+1 Lap	
18	(Switzerland) Serge David	Team ROC Banco	ROC Yamaha	+1 Lap	
19	(Switzerland) Nicholas Schmassman	Uvex Racing Team	ROC Yamaha	+1 Lap	
20	(Republic of Ireland) Eddie Laycock	Milla Racing	Yamaha	+1 Lap	
21	(Luxembourg) Andreas Leuthe	VRP Racing Team	Harris Yamaha	+1 Lap	
22	(Netherlands) Cees Doorakkers	HEK Racing Team	Harris Yamaha	+1 Lap	
23	(United Kingdom) Peter Graves	Peter Graves Racing Team	Harris Yamaha	+2 Laps	
Ret (24)	(Austria) Josef Doppler	Uvex Racing Team	ROC Yamaha	Retirement	
Ret (25)	(Italy) Lucio Pedercini	Paton Grand Prix	Paton	Retirement	
Ret (26)	(Australia) Peter Goddard	Valvoline Team WCM	ROC Yamaha	Retirement	
Ret (27)	(Italy) Corrado Catalano	KCS International	ROC Yamaha	Retirement	
Ret (28)	(United Kingdom) Damon Buckmaster	Padgett's Motorcycles	Harris Yamaha	Retirement	
Ret (29)	(Spain) Juan Garriga	Ducados Yamaha	Yamaha	Retirement	
DNS	(Spain) Juan Lopez Mella	Nivea For Men Team	ROC Yamaha	Did not start	

== 250cc classification ==
Pos	Rider	Manufacturer	Time/Retired	Points
1	(Italy) Luca Cadalora	Honda	45:45.808	20
2	(Italy) Max Biaggi	Aprilia	+3.650	15
3	(Italy) Loris Reggiani	Aprilia	+3.922	12
4	(Italy) Doriano Romboni	Honda	+7.560	10
5	(Germany) Jochen Schmid	Yamaha	+16.221	8
6	(Germany) Helmut Bradl	Honda	+21.434	6
7	(Italy) Loris Capirossi	Honda	+30.564	4
8	(Spain) Alberto Puig	Aprilia	+36.079	3
9	(Netherlands) Patrick van den Goorbergh	Aprilia	+38.279	2
10	(Austria) Andy Preining	Aprilia	+38.294	1
11	(Netherlands) Wilco Zeelenberg	Suzuki	+42.496	
12	(France) Jean-Philippe Ruggia	Gilera	+42.721	
13	(Japan) Masahiro Shimizu	Honda	+44.279	
14	(Venezuela) Carlos Lavado	Gilera	+57.406	
15	(Spain) Herri Torrontegui	Suzuki	+58.146	
16	(Germany) Bernd Kassner	Aprilia	+1.06.792	
17	(Netherlands) Jurgen van den Goorbergh	Aprilia	+1.24.828	
18	(Switzerland) Yves Briguet	Honda	+1.28.889	
19	(Switzerland) Bernard Hänggeli	Aprilia	+1.36.182	
20	(France) Frédéric Protat	Aprilia	+1.45.448	
21	(Germany) Stefan Prein	Honda	+1.48.338	
22	(Japan) Katsuyoshi Kozono	Honda	+1.49.628	
23	(Italy) Renzo Colleoni	Aprilia	+1 Lap	
24	(France) Bernard Cazade	Honda	+1 Lap	
25	(Venezuela) Luis Lavado	Yamaha	+1 Lap	
26	(Germany) Adi Stadler	Honda	+1 Lap	
27	(Italy) Michele Gallina	Yamaha	+1 Lap	
Ret (28)	(Switzerland) Eskil Suter	Aprilia	Retirement	
Ret (29)	(Italy) Pierfrancesco Chili	Aprilia	Retirement	
Ret (30)	(Spain) Luis d'Antin	Honda	Retirement	
Ret (31)	(Italy) Paolo Casoli	Yamaha	Retirement	
Ret (32)	(Germany) Harald Eckl	Aprilia	Retirement	
Ret (33)	(France) José Kuhn	Honda	Retirement	
Ret (34)	(Switzerland) Adrian Bosshard	Honda	Retirement	

Previous race: 1992 British Grand Prix	FIM Grand Prix World Championship; 1992 season	Next race: 1992 South African Grand Prix
Previous race: 1989 Brazilian Grand Prix	Brazilian Grand Prix	Next race: 2026 Brazilian Grand Prix
