= Pierfrancesco Chili =

Italian motorcycle racer

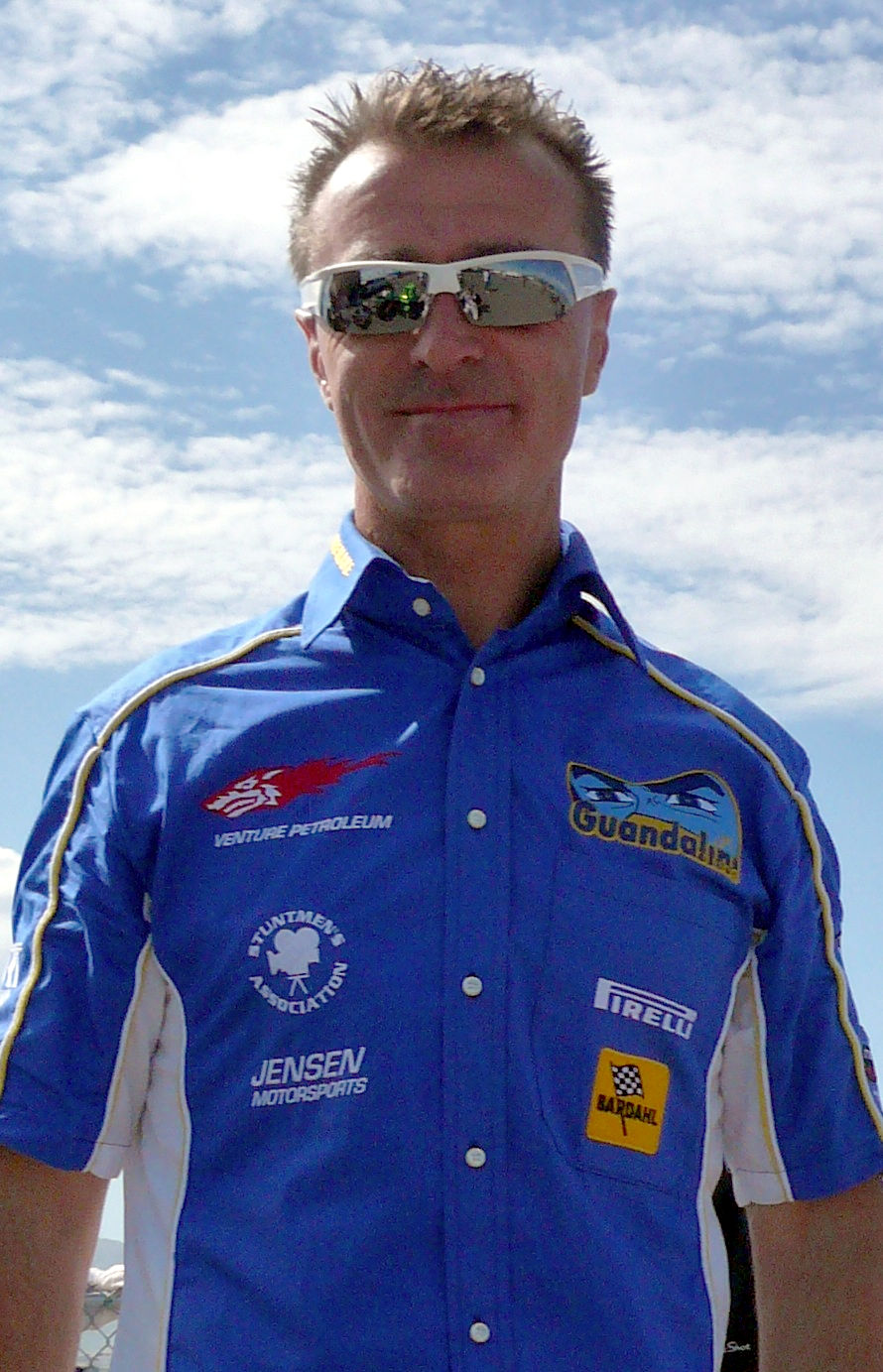
- Chili in 2009
- Nationality: Italian
- Born: 20 June 1964 (age 62); Bologna, Italy
Motorcycle racing career statistics
Grand Prix motorcycle racing
Active years	1986 - 1995
First race	1986 500cc Spanish Grand Prix
Last race	1995 500cc Italian Grand Prix
First win	1989 500cc Nations Grand Prix
Last win	1992 250cc British Grand Prix
Team(s)	Suzuki, Honda, Aprilia, Yamaha, Cagiva
Championships	0
Starts / Wins / Podiums / Poles / F. laps / Points; 102 / 5 / 11 / 5 / 4 / 691
Superbike World Championship
Active years	1995 - 2006
Manufacturers	Ducati, Suzuki, Honda
2006 championship position	22nd
Starts / Wins / Podiums / Poles / F. laps / Points; 276 / 17 / 61 / 10 / 29 / 2381,5

Pierfrancesco 'Frankie' Chili, (born 20 June 1964 in Bologna, Italy) is a former motorcycle racer who competed in the Superbike World Championship and the 250 cc and 500 cc classes in Grand Prix. In September 2020, he confirmed he was suffering from Parkinson's disease.

In the World Superbike championship, Chili had a record number of starts, as well as ten poles and 17 wins. He retired at the end of the 2006 season. Chili also won the 125cc European Championship in 1985.

== 500 cc ==
Chili spent several years on a Gallina HB Honda, with some works backing. He won the 1989 Nations motorcycle Grand Prix when most of the top riders didn't race due to the track being too slippery due to rain, but was generally upper-midfield at best. His best championship finish was sixth in 1989.

== 250 cc ==
Chili stepped down to 250s, finishing third overall in 1992.

== Superbike World Championship ==
Chili switched to the Superbike World Championship in 1995 on a private Ducati, taking a win at Monza and three further podiums, as well as the fastest lap in four races, en route to eighth overall. Curiously, in each of 1995-1997, he won race two at Monza after crashing in race one. In 1996, he took two wins as well as his first two poles, coming sixth in the championship. He was seventh-placed in 1997, taking three wins and three poles but only three more podiums.

Results in 1998 on a factory Ducati were an improvement - Chili won five races to come fourth place overall, his best ever finish. However, at Assen he battled too hard with Carl Fogarty (also on a factory-backed bike, although a separate team), falling on the final lap, and was sacked at the end of the year. In 1999, he raced for Suzuki, coming sixth with two more wins. His first win came in race two at the A1-Ring, after crashing while leading the first race.

In 2000, Chili repeated the ten podiums and fourth place overall of 1998, although with only a single win as Colin Edwards dominated. Over the next two years, he made the podium just three times, coming seventh and eighth in the series. Although he was only seventh again, 2003 represented something of a resurgence for a rider nearing forty years of age; with five third places and one win. The year 2004 was even better for the PSG-1 Ducati team, fifth overall with another nine podiums. In 2005, he moved to the Klaffi Honda team with rookie Max Neukirchner, coming tenth overall. 2006 was ruined by a broken pelvis, which caused him to miss several races. Following his retirement, he became team manager of the Guandalini Racing team in World Superbikes for the 2009 season.

== Career statistics ==
=== Grand Prix motorcycle racing ===
==== Races by year ====
(key) (Races in bold indicate pole position) (Races in italics indicate fastest lap)

Year	Class	Bike	1	2	3	4	5	6	7	8	9	10	11	12	13	14	15	Pos.	Pts
1984	125cc	MBA	NAT	SPA	GER	FRA	NED	GBR	SWE	RSM; Ret								NC	0
1985	125cc	MBA	SPA	GER	NAT	AUT	NED	BEL	FRA	GBR	SWE	RSM; Ret						NC	0
1986	500cc	Suzuki	SPA; 14	NAT; 7	GER; 16	AUT; 9	YUG; Ret	NED	BEL; 6	FRA; Ret	GBR; DNS	SWE	RSM					10th	11
1987	500cc	Honda	JPN; 4	SPA; 11	GER; 6	NAT; 7	AUT; 10	YUG; 6	NED; 9	FRA; 2	GBR; 12	SWE; Ret	CZE; 9	RSM; Ret	POR; 7	BRA; 9	ARG; 9	8th	47
1988	500cc	Honda	JPN; 14	USA; Ret	SPA; 7	EXP; DNS	NAT; 6	GER; 6	AUT; 5	NED; 6	BEL; 8	YUG; 11	FRA; 8	GBR; 8	SWE; 9	CZE; 4	BRA; 7	9th	110
1989	500cc	Honda	JPN; Ret	AUS; Ret	USA; 7	SPA; 6	NAT; 1	GER; 4	AUT; 6	YUG; 9	NED; 5	BEL; 6	FRA; 6	GBR; 9	SWE; 7	CZE; 5	BRA; Ret	6th	122
1990	500cc	Honda	JPN; 7	USA; 3	SPA; 5	NAT; Ret	GER; Ret	AUT; 4	YUG; Ret	NED; 8	BEL; DNS	FRA	GBR	SWE	CZE	HUN	AUS; 9	11th	63
1991	250cc	Aprilia	JPN; 17	AUS; 6	USA; Ret	SPA; 5	ITA; 3	GER; Ret	AUT; 4	EUR; Ret	**NED**; 1	FRA; 4	GBR; DNS	RSM; 8	CZE; Ret	VDM; 7	MAL; 8	7th	107
1992	250cc	Aprilia	JPN; 5	AUS; Ret	**MAL**; 3	SPA; 6	**ITA**; Ret	EUR; 6	GER; 1	NED; 1	HUN; Ret	**FRA**; 2	**GBR**; 1	BRA; Ret	RSA; 3			**3rd**	**119**
1993	250cc	Yamaha	AUS; 10	MAL; 9	JPN; 7	SPA; 12	AUT; 8	GER; 7	NED; 8	EUR; Ret	RSM; 8	GBR; 4	CZE; 8	ITA; 8	USA; 6	FIM; 8		10th	106
1995	500cc	Cagiva	AUS	MAL	JPN	SPA	GER	ITA; 10	NED	FRA	GBR	CZE	BRA	ARG	EUR			27th	6

=== Superbike World Championship ===
==== Races by year ====
(key) (Races in bold indicate pole position) (Races in italics indicate fastest lap)

Year	Make	1		2		3		4		5		6		7		8		9		10		11		12		13		Pos.	Pts
Year	Make	R1	R2	R1	R2	R1	R2	R1	R2	R1	R2	R1	R2	R1	R2	R1	R2	R1	R2	R1	R2	R1	R2	R1	R2	R1	R2	Pos.	Pts
1995	Ducati	GER; 15	GER; 9	SMR; 4	SMR; 4	GBR; Ret	GBR; 2	ITA; Ret	ITA; 1	SPA; 4	SPA; 2	AUT; 11	AUT; Ret	USA; Ret	USA; Ret	EUR; 6	EUR; Ret	JPN; 15	JPN; Ret	NED; Ret	NED; DNS	INA; Ret	INA; 3	AUS; 6	AUS; 10			8th	160
1996	Ducati	SMR; 3	SMR; 3	GBR; 4	GBR; 5	**GER**; Ret	**GER**; Ret	**ITA**; 4	**ITA**; 1	CZE; 8	CZE; 10	USA; Ret	USA; 7	EUR; 1	EUR; 2	INA; 4	INA; Ret	JPN; Ret	JPN; DNS	NED; 2	NED; 4	SPA; Ret	SPA; Ret	AUS; 8	AUS; 9			6th	223
1997	Ducati	AUS; Ret	AUS; DNS	SMR; 1	SMR; Ret	GBR; Ret	GBR; 2	GER; 5	GER; 7	ITA; 7	ITA; 1	**USA**; Ret	**USA**; 6	**EUR**; 1	**EUR**; Ret	**AUT**; 4	**AUT**; Ret	NED; 3	NED; 2	SPA; 5	SPA; 7	JPN; 10	JPN; Ret	INA; Ret	INA; Ret			7th	209
1998	Ducati	AUS; 4	AUS; Ret	GBR; 3	GBR; 5	ITA; 5	ITA; 3	SPA; 1	SPA; 5	GER; 3	GER; 1	SMR; Ret	SMR; Ret	**RSA**; 1	**RSA**; 1	USA; 7	USA; 4	EUR; 9	EUR; 6	AUT; 2	AUT; 3	**NED**; 1	**NED**; Ret	JPN; 12	JPN; 23			4th	293.5
1999	Suzuki	RSA; 7	RSA; 8	AUS; Ret	AUS; 13	**GBR**; Ret	**GBR**; 5	SPA; 5	SPA; 5	ITA; 3	ITA; 3	GER; Ret	GER; 5	SMR; 4	SMR; 6	USA; 7	USA; 3	EUR; 3	EUR; Ret	AUT; Ret	AUT; 1	NED; 4	NED; 6	GER; Ret	GER; 1	JPN; 7	JPN; 7	6th	251
2000	Suzuki	RSA; 5	RSA; 2	AUS; Ret	AUS; 3	JPN; 3	JPN; Ret	GBR; 2	GBR; 3	ITA; 1	ITA; 2	GER; Ret	GER; 3	SMR; Ret	SMR; Ret	SPA; Ret	SPA; 9	USA; 5	USA; 6	EUR; 8	EUR; 3	NED; Ret	NED; Ret	GER; 6	GER; 6	GBR; 10	GBR; 2	4th	258
2001	Suzuki	SPA; 7	SPA; 7	RSA; 6	RSA; 8	AUS; 7	AUS; C	JPN; 8	JPN; 8	ITA; 14	ITA; 5	GBR; 2	GBR; 1	GER; 4	GER; 5	SMR; 12	SMR; 10	USA; Ret	USA; Ret	EUR; 4	EUR; 4	GER; 6	GER; 6	NED; 4	NED; 4	ITA; Ret	ITA; 9	7th	232
2002	Ducati	SPA; 9	SPA; Ret	AUS; Ret	AUS; Ret	RSA; DNS	RSA; DNS	JPN	JPN	ITA; 4	ITA; Ret	GBR; 4	GBR; 11	GER; 6	GER; 6	SMR; 6	SMR; 7	USA; 12	USA; 7	GBR; 8	GBR; 7	GER; 5	GER; 7	NED; 5	NED; 2	ITA; 7	ITA; Ret	8th	167
2003	Ducati	SPA; Ret	SPA; Ret	AUS; Ret	AUS; 3	JPN; Ret	JPN; 3	ITA; 5	ITA; 3	GER; 2	GER; 11	GBR; 7	GBR; 7	SMR; Ret	SMR; 3	USA; 1	USA; Ret	GBR; 9	GBR; 7	**NED**; 3	**NED**; 5	ITA; 5	ITA; Ret	FRA; Ret	FRA; Ret			7th	197
2004	Ducati	SPA; 2	SPA; 4	AUS; 9	AUS; 3	SMR; 3	SMR; 1	ITA; Ret	ITA; Ret	GER; 3	GER; Ret	GBR; 3	GBR; Ret	USA; 2	USA; 5	EUR; Ret	EUR; 2	**NED**; 2	**NED**; 4	ITA; 7	ITA; Ret	FRA; 6	FRA; 5					5th	243
2005	Honda	QAT; Ret	QAT; 5	AUS; DNS	AUS; DNS	SPA; 7	SPA; 10	ITA; 7	ITA; 7	EUR; 5	EUR; 5	SMR; 7	SMR; 5	CZE; 5	CZE; 5	GBR; Ret	GBR; 13	NED; 10	NED; 14	GER; Ret	GER; 10	ITA; Ret	ITA; C	FRA; Ret	FRA; 10			10th	131
2006	Honda	QAT; 8	QAT; Ret	AUS; 16	AUS; 14	SPA	SPA	ITA	ITA	EUR	EUR	SMR; 20	SMR; Ret	CZE; 10	CZE; Ret	GBR; Ret	GBR; Ret	NED; Ret	NED; Ret	GER; Ret	GER; Ret	ITA; 16	ITA; 18	FRA; Ret	FRA; 15			22nd	17

Sporting positions
Preceded by (Germany) Norbert Peschke	125 cc motorcycle European Champion; 1985	Succeeded by (Italy) Claudio Macciotta
