= 1988 Japanese motorcycle Grand Prix =

(Japan) 1988 Japanese Grand Prix
Race details
- Race 1 of 15 races in the 1988 Grand Prix motorcycle racing season
- Date: 27 March 1988
- Official name: Grand Prix of Japan
- Location: Suzuka Circuit
- Course: Permanent racing facility; 5.864 km (3.644 mi)

500cc
Pole position
Rider	(Japan) Tadahiko Taira	Yamaha
Time	2:32.007	
Fastest lap
Rider	(United States) Kevin Schwantz	Suzuki
Time	2:15.220	
Podium
First	(United States) Kevin Schwantz	Suzuki
Second	(Australia) Wayne Gardner	Honda
Third	(United States) Eddie Lawson	Yamaha

250cc
Pole position
Rider	(Japan) Toshihiko Honma	Yamaha
Time	2:19.790	
Fastest lap
Rider	(Spain) Sito Pons	Honda
Time	2:19.630	
Podium
First	(West Germany) Anton Mang	Honda
Second	(Spain) Sito Pons	Honda
Third	(Japan) Masaru Kobayashi	Honda

The 1988 Japanese motorcycle Grand Prix was the first round of the 1988 Grand Prix motorcycle racing season. It took place on the weekend of 25–27 March 1988 at the Suzuka Circuit.

== 500 cc race report ==
Tadahiko Taira was on pole of the 5-column grid (it became 4-columns in 1990). Wayne Rainey got the start and lead through the first turns, with Kevin Schwantz, Wayne Gardner and Christian Sarron behind. Schwantz took the inside of the hairpin, but Rainey dove back under and got him back on the exit; Schwantz succeeded in taking the lead on Spoon.

At the end of the 1st lap, it was Schwantz and Gardner, then a gap to Toshihiko Honma (riding #46) and Sarron. Gardner and Schwantz swapped the lead many times.

Eddie Lawson and Niall Mackenzie moved through the field to 3rd and 4th. Norihiko Fujiwara lowsided at the hairpin.

On the last lap Gardner ran off the track and stayed on, but lost any chance of winning the race.

== 500 cc classification ==
Pos.	Rider	Team	Manufacturer	Time/Retired	Points
1	(United States) Kevin Schwantz	Suzuki Pepsi Cola	Suzuki	50:03.750	20
2	(Australia) Wayne Gardner	Rothmans Honda Team	Honda	+8.384	17
3	(United States) Eddie Lawson	Marlboro Yamaha Team Agostini	Yamaha	+12.724	15
4	(United Kingdom) Niall Mackenzie	Team HRC	Honda	+15.785	13
5	(Japan) Tadahiko Taira	Tech 21	Yamaha	+36.383	11
6	(United States) Wayne Rainey	Team Lucky Strike Roberts	Yamaha	+42.070	10
7	(Australia) Kevin Magee	Team Lucky Strike Roberts	Yamaha	+42.179	9
8	(France) Christian Sarron	Sonauto Gauloises Blondes Yamaha Mobil 1	Yamaha	+45.186	8
9	(Belgium) Didier de Radiguès	Marlboro Yamaha Team Agostini	Yamaha	+1:01.213	7
10	(Japan) Shunji Yatsushiro	Rothmans Honda Team	Honda	+1:10.228	6
11	(Japan) Hikaru Miyagi	Team HRC	Honda	+1:16.201	5
12	(United Kingdom) Ron Haslam	Team ROC Elf Honda	Elf Honda	+1:20.045	4
13	(France) Patrick Igoa	Sonauto Gauloises Blondes Yamaha Mobil 1	Yamaha	+1:29.535	3
14	(Italy) Pierfrancesco Chili	HB Honda Gallina Team	Honda	+1:38.989	2
15	(Japan) Osamu Hiwatashi	Suzuki Japan	Suzuki	+1:42.545	1
16	(Japan) Shinji Katayama		Yamaha	+1:43.611	
17	(Japan) Masaru Mizutani		Suzuki	+2:04.446	
18	(Japan) Keiji Kinoshita		Honda	+1 Lap	
19	(Italy) Alessandro Valesi	Team Iberia	Honda	+1 Lap	
Ret	(France) Raymond Roche	Cagiva Corse	Cagiva	Retirement	
Ret	(United Kingdom) Rob McElnea	Suzuki Pepsi Cola	Suzuki	Retirement	
Ret	(Japan) Katunori Shinozaki		Suzuki	Retirement	
Ret	(Japan) Norihiko Fujiwara	Lucky Strike Yamaha	Yamaha	Retirement	
Ret	(United States) Randy Mamola	Cagiva Corse	Cagiva	Retirement	
Ret	(Japan) Hisashi Yamana		Suzuki	Retirement	
Ret	(Switzerland) Marco Gentile	Fior Marlboro	Fior	Retirement	
Ret	(West Germany) Manfred Fischer	Team Hein Gericke	Honda	Retirement	
DNS	(Italy) Fabio Barchitta	Racing Team Katayama	Honda	Did not start	
DNQ	(Japan) Kunio Machii		Honda	Yamaha	

Previous race: 1987 Argentine Grand Prix	FIM Grand Prix World Championship; 1988 season	Next race: 1988 United States Grand Prix
Previous race: 1987 Japanese Grand Prix	Japanese Grand Prix	Next race: 1989 Japanese Grand Prix
