= 1990 Japanese motorcycle Grand Prix =

(Japan) 1990 Japanese Grand Prix
Race details
- Race 1 of 15 races in the 1990 Grand Prix motorcycle racing season
- Date: 25 March 1990
- Official name: Kibun Japanese Grand Prix
- Location: Suzuka Circuit
- Course: Permanent racing facility; 5.821 km (3.617 mi)

500cc
Pole position
- Rider: (United States) Wayne Rainey
- Time: 2:09.589
Fastest lap
- Rider: (United States) Wayne Rainey
- Time: 2:11.354
Podium
- First: (United States) Wayne Rainey
- Second: (Australia) Wayne Gardner
- Third: (United States) Kevin Schwantz

250cc
Pole position
- Rider: (United States) John Kocinski
- Time: 2:14.273
Fastest lap
- Rider: (Switzerland) Jacques Cornu
- Time: 2:16.452
Podium
- First: (Italy) Luca Cadalora
- Second: (Spain) Carlos Cardús
- Third: (Netherlands) Wilco Zeelenberg

125cc
Pole position
- Rider: (Japan) Kinya Wada
- Time: 2:25.033
Fastest lap
- Rider: (Germany) Stefan Prein
- Time: 2:25.045
Podium
- First: (Netherlands) Hans Spaan
- Second: (Germany) Stefan Prein
- Third: (Japan) Koji Takada

The 1990 Japanese motorcycle Grand Prix was the first round of the 1990 Grand Prix motorcycle racing season. It took place on the weekend of 23–25 March 1990 at the Suzuka Circuit.

== 500 cc race report ==
Wayne Rainey's pole of 2:09.589 is the first sub-2:10 lap at Suzuka. Rainey gets the start of the new 4-column grid, followed by Mick Doohan, Eddie Lawson and the field. Rainey goes through the chicane with a sub-second gap, followed by Lawson, Doohan, Kevin Schwantz and Wayne Gardner.

Rainey is opening a gap, but Schwantz moves into second and leads the chase. Entering the back straight, Schwantz looks behind him to see who's back there, but Lawson's proximity probably blocks the view.

Perhaps Schwantz had a feeling something bad was about to happen. Going into 130R, Gardner barely manages to pass on the brakes and move into second place, while Doohan brakes for all he's worth, getting the back wheel in the air, and loses the front end as he leans it in. Unfortunately, he's inside of Lawson when he falls, so Doohan's bike hits Lawson's rear wheel hard, taking him out too. Lawson, who came out of 1989 without a race crash, begins the season with a DNF and a broken left ankle.

Rainey has a large gap, and Gardner and Schwantz are scraping fairings for second.

Last lap and Rainey has an untouchable lead, and Gardner goes slightly wide heading towards the chicane, but manages to hold Schwantz off; as they flick it right and then left, Schwantz touches Gardner's back tire and drops his bike. Because it happened at such a low speed, Schwantz is able to get back on quickly and still cross the line in third place.

Schwantz: "I thought I had Gardner sorted out pretty good for the last lap going into the chicane. Just as soon as I got up the inside and he saw my wheel, he came in and I think he was still going in too fast. He went into the chicane real deep. I got turned quick because I knew he was going to be wide. He came back across and as I was coming down, we hit. I guess it all depends on how you look at it as to who's [sic] fault it was. I'd say it was his."

== 500 cc classification ==
Pos.	No.	Rider	Team	Manufacturer	Laps	Time/Retired	Grid	Points
1	2	(United States) Wayne Rainey	Marlboro Team Roberts	Yamaha	22	48:52.475	1	20
2	10	(Australia) Wayne Gardner	Rothmans Honda Team	Honda	22	+3.237	3	17
3	34	(United States) Kevin Schwantz	Lucky Strike Suzuki	Suzuki	22	+15.556	2	15
4	4	(Australia) Kevin Magee	Lucky Strike Suzuki	Suzuki	22	+40.689	7	13
5	6	(Spain) Sito Pons	Campsa Banesto	Honda	22	+41.008	9	11
6	21	(Japan) Tadahiko Taira	Tech 21	Yamaha	22	+51.363	10	10
7	5	(Italy) Pierfrancesco Chili	Team ROC Elf La Cinq	Honda	22	+51.536	6	9
8	14	(France) Jean-Philippe Ruggia	Sonauto Gauloises	Yamaha	22	+53.739	15	8
9	39	(Japan) Shinichi Itoh	Team HRC	Honda	22	+1:02.515	8	7
10	11	(Spain) Juan Garriga	Ducados Yamaha	Yamaha	22	+1:25.526	18	6
11	37	(Japan) Hikaru Miyagi	Teera	Honda	22	+1:29.184	20	5
12	41	(Japan) Shinji Katayama	UCC	Yamaha	22	+1:42.002	21	4
13	38	(Japan) Osamu Hiwatashi	Schick Advantage	Suzuki	22	+1:42.713	19	3
Ret	43	(Japan) Keiji Ohishi		Yamaha	18	Retirement	22	
Ret	18	(United States) Randy Mamola	Cagiva Corse	Cagiva	18	Retirement	17	
Ret	28	(Brazil) Alex Barros	Cagiva Corse	Cagiva	12	Retirement	24	
Ret	40	(Japan) Satoshi Tsujimoto		Suzuki	9	Retirement	13	
Ret	3	(France) Christian Sarron	Sonauto Gauloises	Yamaha	8	Retirement	11	
Ret	8	(United Kingdom) Ron Haslam	Cagiva Corse	Cagiva	8	Retirement	23	
Ret	36	(Japan) Kunio Machii		Yamaha	7	Retirement	12	
Ret	1	(United States) Eddie Lawson	Marlboro Team Roberts	Yamaha	4	Retirement	4	
Ret	9	(Australia) Mick Doohan	Rothmans Honda Team	Honda	4	Retirement	5	
Ret	15	(Japan) Norihiko Fujiwara	Yamaha Motor Company	Yamaha	2	Retirement	16	
DNS	35	(Japan) Shunji Yatsushiro	YS Racing	Honda		Did not start	14	
DNQ	26	(Switzerland) Nicholas Schmassman	Team Schmassman	Honda		Did not qualify		
DNQ	44	(Japan) Kenmei Matsumoto	Meikoh	Honda		Did not qualify		

Previous race: 1989 Brazilian Grand Prix	FIM Grand Prix World Championship; 1990 season	Next race: 1990 United States Grand Prix
Previous race: 1989 Japanese Grand Prix	Japanese motorcycle Grand Prix	Next race: 1991 Japanese Grand Prix
