= Surtees TS15 =

Racing car

Surtees TS15 Surtees TS15A
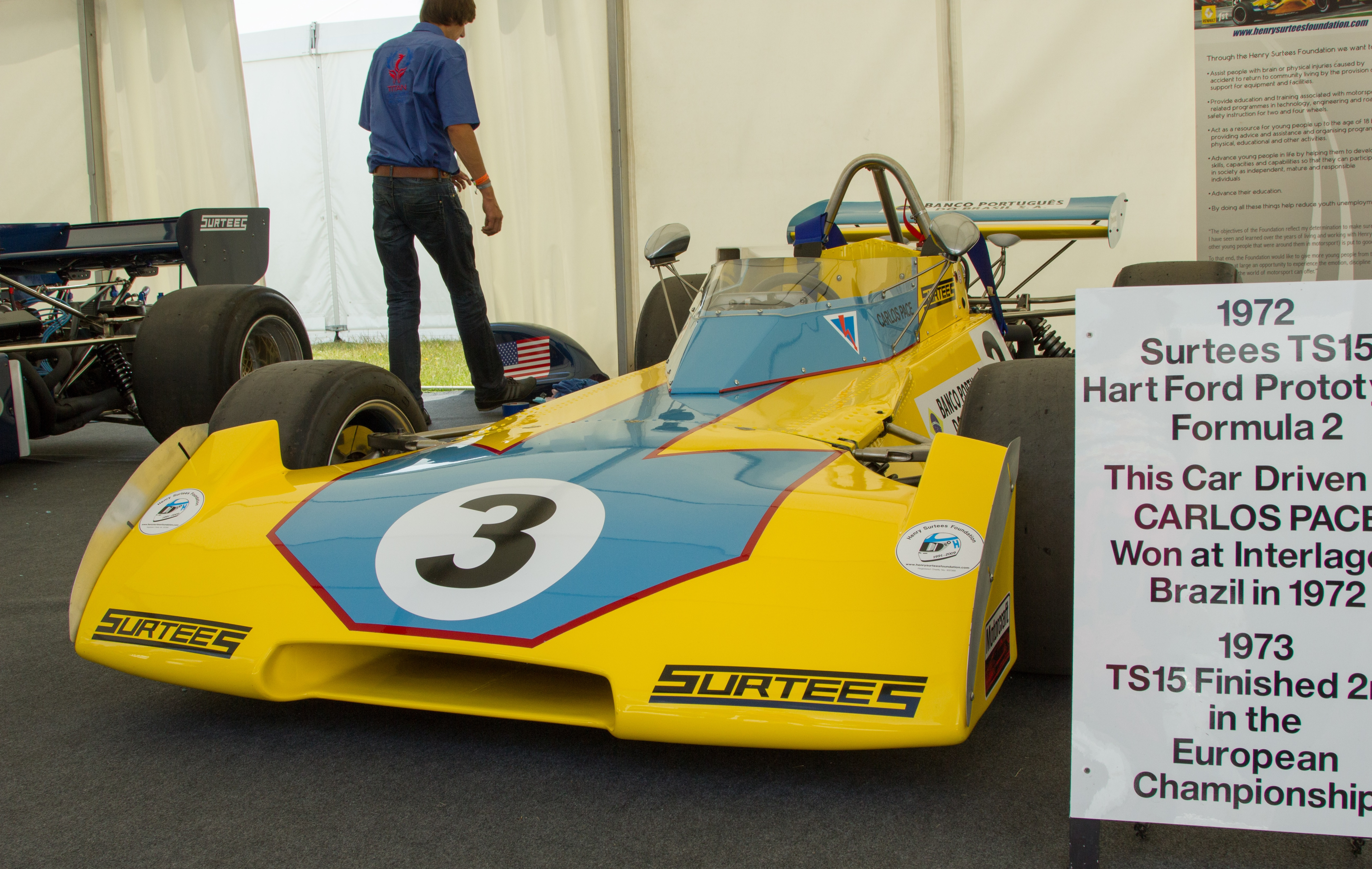
- Constructor: Surtees

Technical specifications
- Chassis: Aluminium Monocoque
- Suspension (front): Double wishbones, coil springs over dampers, anti-roll bar
- Suspension (rear): Twin lower links, Single top links, twin trailing arms, Coil springs over Dampers, Anti-roll bar
- Wheelbase: 2,413 mm (95.0 in)
- Engine: Ford-Cosworth BDD, 1.6 L (97.6 cu in), L4, DOHC, mid-engined, NA
- Transmission: Hewland F.G. 400 5-speed manual
- Power: 200 hp (149 kW)
- Weight: 460 kg (1,010 lb)
- Tires: Firestone

Competition history
- Debut: 1973
Wins	Podiums
2	11

The Surtees TS15, and its derivative, the Surtees TS15A, are open-wheel Formula 2 race car chassis, designed, developed and built by Surtees for the European Formula Two Championship, between 1973 and 1974. German Jochen Mass won two races, and finished runner-up in the 1973 championship, with 42 points. The TS15 was powered by a naturally aspirated, 1.6 L (98 cu in), Ford-Cosworth BDD four-cylinder engine, tuned by Brian Hart, to produce a respectable 200 hp (150 kW). It was the team's final Formula Two car.
