= Wayne Rainey =

American motorcycle racer (born 1960)

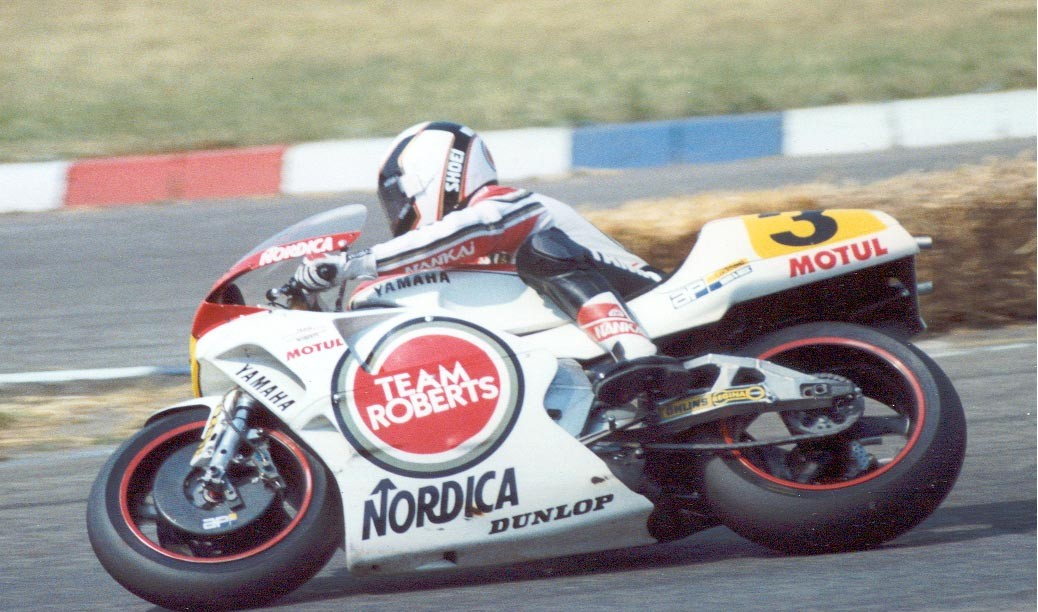
- Rainey on the Yamaha YZR500
- Born: October 23, 1960 (age 66); Downey, California, U.S.
Motorcycle racing career statistics
Grand Prix motorcycle racing
Active years	1984, 1988 - 1993
First race	1984 250cc Nations Grand Prix
Last race	1993 500cc Italian Grand Prix
First win	1988 500cc British Grand Prix
Last win	1993 500cc Czech Republic Grand Prix
Team	Yamaha
Championships	500cc - 1990, 1991, 1992
Starts / Wins / Podiums / Poles / F. laps / Points; 94 / 24 / 65 / 16 / 23 / 1270.5

Wayne Wesley Rainey (born October 23, 1960) is an American former Grand Prix motorcycle road racer. He competed in the FIM Grand Prix motorcycle racing world championships in 1984 and from 1988 to 1993. He won the 500cc World Championship three times and the Daytona 200 once. He was characterized by his smooth, calculating riding style, and for his intense rivalry with compatriot Kevin Schwantz, between 1987 and 1993.

== Racing history ==
Rainey began his career racing in the A.M.A. Grand National Championship, a series that encompassed four distinct dirt track disciplines plus road races. In 1981, he finished the Grand National season as the 15th ranked dirt track racer in the country. Following his success in the Novice 250cc roadrace class, Kawasaki hired him to compete in the 1982 AMA Superbike Championship as a teammate to the then defending National Champion Eddie Lawson. The following year, Lawson moved to the Grand Prix circuit and Rainey took over the role of leading rider, earning the 1983 National Championship for Kawasaki.

In 1984, Rainey accepted an offer to ride for the newly formed Kenny Roberts Yamaha racing team in the 250cc class of the Grand Prix World Championship. A less than successful season (1 podium and difficulty push-starting the bike) saw him returning home in 1985 to join the Maclean Racing team in U.S. 250 and Formula 1 classes, and then on to the American Honda team from 1986 to 1987 where he raced Superbike and F1. It was during the 1987 Superbike National Championship that his intense rivalry began with Kevin Schwantz as the two battled it out for the title. Rainey won the Championship, but the fierce rivalry between the two competitors was just beginning. So intense was their rivalry that they continued their battle during the 1987 Transatlantic Trophy match races in which they were supposedly teammates competing against a team of British riders.

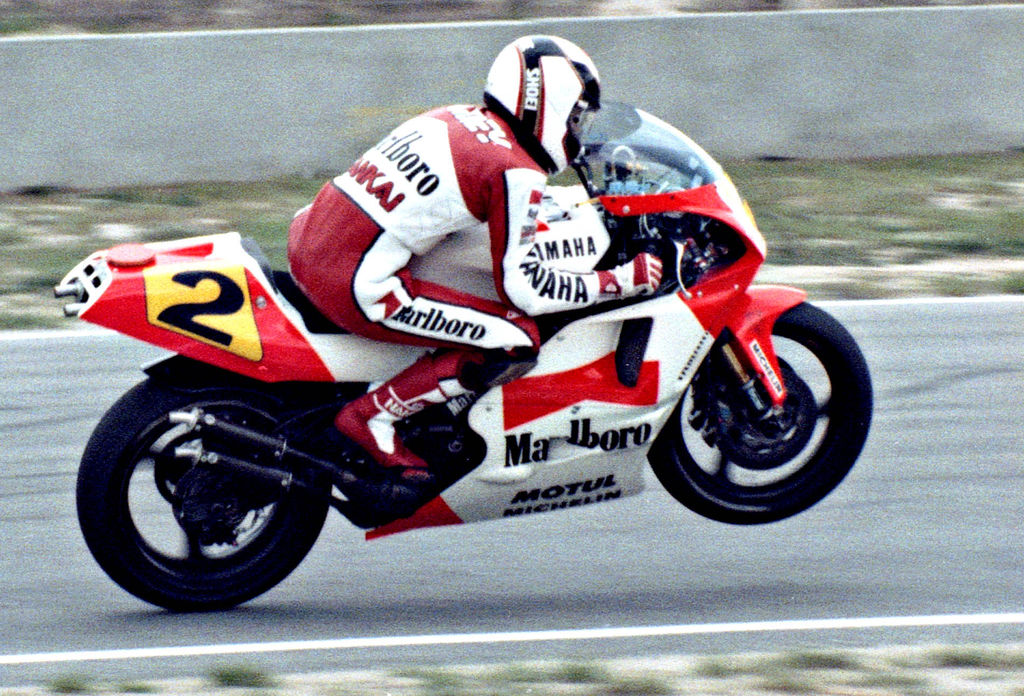
Wayne Rainey on a Yamaha YZR500 in 1990

In 1988, Rainey returned to Europe, again joining Team Roberts Yamaha, this time in the premier 500cc division riding the YZR500. His arch-rival Schwantz followed him to Europe, signing to race the 500cc class for Team Suzuki. The two would continue their rivalry on race tracks all across Europe, driving each other to higher levels of competitiveness. In 1988, Rainey won his first world championship race at the British Grand Prix. Also in 1988, he and his Team Roberts Yamaha teammate Kevin Magee won the prestigious Suzuka 8 Hours endurance race in Japan. In the 1989 campaign, Rainey finished second overall behind Eddie Lawson, winning three races and placing on the podium in every race that he finished.

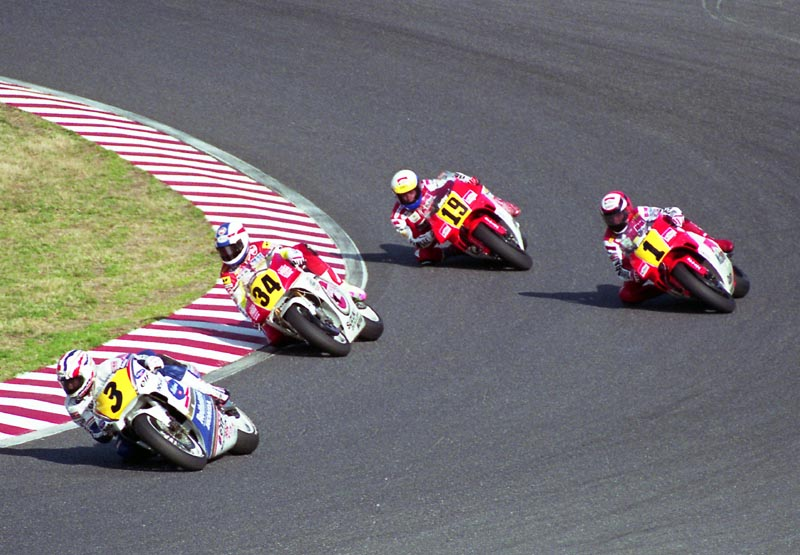
Mick Doohan (3) leads Kevin Schwantz (34), Rainey (1) and John Kocinski (19) at the 1991 Japanese Grand Prix. Schwantz would go on to win the race.

From 1990 to 1992, Rainey hit his stride earning three consecutive 500cc crowns for Yamaha. Rainey was involved in a hard-fought campaign with Kevin Schwantz while seeking his fourth-consecutive title in 1993. He was leading the championship by a margin of 11 points over Schwantz, and leading the GP when he suffered his career-ending crash at the Italian Grand Prix in Misano. He slid into the gravel trap at high speed, breaking his spine against the raked surface designed as a safety feature for car racing. The injury handed the title to his great rival Kevin Schwantz. Rainey's injuries rendered him permanently paralyzed from the chest down.

After turning to Williams team owner and quadriplegic Frank Williams for advice, Rainey later became the team manager for Marlboro Yamaha for a few years. After the 1995 season, Schwantz retired from the Grand Prix circuit, partly due to nagging injuries and partly because losing the one great rival that had fired his competitive intensity made him view his own mortality much more clearly.

Rainey refused to give up racing despite his disability and raced a hand-controlled Superkart in the World SuperKart series based in Northern California.

Rainey lived in Monterey, California in a house that is not far from WeatherTech Raceway Laguna Seca. The nearby circuit named a corner in his honor, Rainey Curve, which is a medium-speed, acute left-hander that follows the famous Corkscrew. Rainey was inducted into the AMA Motorcycle Hall of Fame in 1999. The FIM named him a Grand Prix "Legend" in 2000. He was inducted into the International Motorsports Hall of Fame in 2007. In 2003, he was one of the subjects of the motorcycle racing documentary film, Faster.

After several seasons of poor decisions by Daytona Motorsports Group, the organization that operated AMA-sanctioned road racing beginning in 2009, a dispute with Dorna/Infront in 2013 regarding AMA Superbike coverage on shared FIM weekends led to a lack of media coverage for that year's Superbike round at WeatherTech Raceway Laguna Seca, as well as the Harley-Davidson XR1200 round at Indianapolis Motor Speedway in both 2013 and 2014, the AMA transferred the commercial rights to AMA-sanctioned road racing to Rainey and his business partners at the end of 2014. The MotoAmerica era of AMA-sanctioned road racing began in 2015.

Rainey lives in Monterey, California, with his wife Shae. They have one son, Rex, who graduated from Pepperdine University and works at CBS Television Distribution with the Entertainment Tonight and The Insider accounts.

Rainey rode his 1992 YZR500 at the 2022 Goodwood Festival of Speed. Yamaha specially modified the bike by moving the rear brake and gear shift controls to the handlebars.

== Awards ==
Rainey was inducted into the Motorsports Hall of Fame of America in 2008.

== Grand Prix career statistics ==
Points system from 1969 to 1987:

**Position**	1	2	3	4	5	6	7	8	9	10
**Points**	15	12	10	8	6	5	4	3	2	1

Points system from 1988 to 1992:

**Position**	1	2	3	4	5	6	7	8	9	10	11	12	13	14	15
**Points**	20	17	15	13	11	10	9	8	7	6	5	4	3	2	1

Points system from 1993 onwards:

**Position**	1	2	3	4	5	6	7	8	9	10	11	12	13	14	15
**Points**	25	20	16	13	11	10	9	8	7	6	5	4	3	2	1

(key) (Races in bold indicate pole position; races in italics indicate fastest lap)

Year	Class	Team	Machine	1	2	3	4	5	6	7	8	9	10	11	12	13	14	15	Points	Rank	Wins
1984	250cc	Roberts Yamaha	TZR250	RSA; NC	NAT; 3	ESP; 10	AUT; NC	GER; 6	FRA; 6	**YUG**; 4	NED; 12	BEL; NC	GBR; 14	SWE; 13	RSM; NC				29	8th	0
1988	500cc	Lucky Strike Roberts Yamaha	YZR500	JPN; 6	**USA**; 4	ESP; 6	EXP; 2	NAT; 3	GER; 2	AUT; 3	NED; 7	BEL; 5	YUG; 3	FRA; 5	GBR; 1	SWE; 5	CZE; 3	BRA; Ret	189	3rd	1
1989	500cc	Lucky Strike Roberts Yamaha	YZR500	JPN; 2	AUS; 2	**USA**; 1	**ESP**; 2	NAT; DNS	GER; 1	AUT; 3	YUG; 2	NED; 1	BEL; 3	FRA; 3	GBR; 3	**SWE**; DNF	CZE; 3	**BRA**; 3	210.5	2nd	3
1990	500cc	Marlboro Roberts Yamaha	YZR500	**JPN**; 1	USA; 1	ESP; 2	**NAT**; 1	GER; 2	AUT; 2	**YUG**; 1	NED; 2	BEL; 1	FRA; 3	GBR; 2	SWE; 1	CZE; 1	HUN; DNF	AUS; 3	255	1st	7
1991	500cc	Marlboro Roberts Yamaha	YZR500	JPN; 3	**AUS**; 1	**USA**; 1	**ESP**; 3	**ITA**; 9	GER; 2	AUT; 2	EUR; 1	NED; 2	**FRA**; 1	GBR; 2	RSM; 1	**CZE**; 1	VDM; 3	MAL; DNS	233	1st	6
1992	500cc	Marlboro Roberts Yamaha	YZR500	JPN; DNF	AUS; 2	MAL; 2	ESP; 2	ITA; DNF	EUR; 1	GER; DNF	NED; DNS	HUN; 5	FRA; 1	GBR; 2	BRA; 1	RSA; 3			140	1st	3
1993	500cc	Marlboro Roberts Yamaha	YZR500	AUS; 2	MAL; 1	JPN; 1	ESP; 2	AUT; 3	GER; 5	NED; 5	EUR; 1	RSM; 3	GBR; 2	**CZE**; 1	ITA; DNF	USA -	FIM -		214	2nd	4

=== Suzuka 8 Hours results ===
Year	Team	Co-Rider	Bike	Pos
1988	(United States) Team Lucky Strikes Roberts	(Australia) Kevin Magee (United States) Wayne Rainey	Yamaha YZF750	1st

== Bibliography ==
- Scott, Michael (August 1, 1997). Wayne Rainey: His Own Story. Haynes Publishing. ISBN 978-1859604014.
