= List of Grand Prix motorcycle racing rider records =

This is a list of all-time Grand Prix motorcycle racing (50cc/80cc, MotoE, 125cc/Moto3, 250cc/Moto2, 350cc, and 500cc/MotoGP classes) rider records, since 1949. Riders that have competed in the 2026 Grand Prix motorcycle racing season are highlighted in bold.

This page is accurate as of the 2026 Qatar Grand Prix.

== Race entered and started ==
Riders are considered to be entered into a race if they attempt to compete in at least one official practice session with the intent of entering the race. These riders are noted on the entry list for that race. A rider is considered to have started a race if they line up on the grid or at the pitlane exit for the start of the race. If a race is stopped and restarted, participation in any portion of the race is counted, but only if that portion was in any way counted towards the final classification.

=== Total entries ===
	Rider	Seasons	Entries
1	(Italy) Valentino Rossi	1996–2021	435
2	(Spain) **Aleix Espargaró**	2004–2026	351
3	(Italy) Andrea Dovizioso	2001–2022	348
4	(Italy) Loris Capirossi	1990–2011	334
5	(Italy) Simone Corsi	2002–2022, 2024	327
6	(Switzerland) Thomas Lüthi	2002–2021	324
7	(France) **Johann Zarco**	2009–2026	319
8	(Spain) **Marc Márquez**	2008–2026	313
9	(Spain) **Pol Espargaró**	2006–2026	309
10	(Spain) Dani Pedrosa	2001–2018, 2021, 2023–2024	307

=== Total starts ===
	Rider	Seasons	Starts
1	(Italy) Valentino Rossi	1996–2021	432
2	(Italy) Andrea Dovizioso	2001–2022	346
3	(Spain) **Aleix Espargaró**	2004–2025	344
4	(Italy) Loris Capirossi	1990–2011	328
5	(Italy) Simone Corsi	2002–2022, 2024	321
6	(Switzerland) Thomas Lüthi	2002–2021	317
6	(France) **Johann Zarco**	2009–2026	317
8	(Spain) **Marc Márquez**	2008–2026	302
9	(Spain) **Pol Espargaró**	2006–2026	300
10	(Spain) Dani Pedrosa	2001–2018, 2021, 2023–2024	299

== Wins ==
=== Total Grand Prix wins ===
	Rider	Wins
1	(Italy) Giacomo Agostini	122
2	(Italy) Valentino Rossi	115
3	(Spain) **Marc Márquez**	106
4	(Spain) Ángel Nieto	90
5	(United Kingdom) Mike Hailwood	76
6	(Spain) Jorge Lorenzo	68
7	(Australia) Mick Doohan	54
7	(Spain) Dani Pedrosa	54
9	(United Kingdom) Phil Read	52
10	(Rhodesia) Jim Redman	45
10	(Australia) Casey Stoner	45

=== Most consecutive Grand Prix wins ===
	Rider	Season(s)	Wins	Consecutive races won
1	(Italy) Giacomo Agostini	1968–1969	35	1968 350cc West German–1969 500cc Ulster
2	(Italy) Giacomo Agostini	1970	19	1970 350cc West German–1970 500cc Nations
3	(United Kingdom) John Surtees	1958–1959	17	1958 350cc Ulster–1959 500cc Nations
4	(Germany) Anton Mang	1981	13	1981 250cc French–1981 350cc Czechoslovak
5	(Italy) Carlo Ubbiali	1955–1956	12	1955 125cc French–1956 250cc Belgian
6	(Spain) Ángel Nieto	1978–1979	11	1978 125cc Finnish–1979 125cc Dutch
6	(Italy) Fausto Gresini	1986–1987	11	1986 125cc Baden-Württemberg–1987 125cc San Marino
8	(United Kingdom) Mike Hailwood	1965–1966	10	1965 500cc Nations–1966 250cc East German
8	(Australia) Mick Doohan	1997	10	1997 500cc Italian–1997 500cc Catalan
8	(Spain) **Marc Márquez**	2014	10	2014 MotoGP Qatar–2014 MotoGP Indianapolis

=== Youngest Grand Prix winners ===
(only the first win for each rider is listed)

	Rider	Age	Race	Class
1	(Turkey) Can Öncü	15 years, 115 days	2018 Valencian Grand Prix	Moto3
2	(United Kingdom) Scott Redding	15 years, 170 days	2008 British Grand Prix	125cc
3	(Italy) Marco Melandri	15 years, 324 days	1998 Dutch TT	125cc
4	(Italy) Romano Fenati	16 years, 105 days	2012 Spanish Grand Prix	Moto3
5	(Spain) **Maverick Viñales**	16 years, 123 days	2011 French Grand Prix	125cc
6	(Spain) Jorge Lorenzo	16 years, 139 days	2003 Rio Grand Prix	125cc
7	(Italy) Ivan Goi	16 years, 157 days	1996 Austrian Grand Prix	125cc
8	(Spain) **Sergio García**	16 years, 240 days	2019 Valencian Grand Prix	Moto3
9	(Spain) Héctor Barberá	16 years, 253 days	2003 British Grand Prix	125cc
10	(Spain) Dani Pedrosa	16 years, 273 days	2002 Dutch TT	125cc

=== Oldest Grand Prix winners ===
(only the last win for each rider is listed)

	Rider	Age	Race	Class
1	(United Kingdom) Arthur Wheeler	46 years, 70 days	1962 Argentine Grand Prix	250cc
2	(United Kingdom) Fergus Anderson	45 years, 236 days	1954 Spanish Grand Prix	350cc
3	(Germany) Hermann Paul Müller	45 years, 217 days	1955 West German Grand Prix	250cc
4	(Italy) Enrico Lorenzetti	42 years, 273 days	1953 Spanish Grand Prix	250cc
5	(Australia) Jack Findlay	42 years, 85 days	1977 Austrian Grand Prix	500cc
6	(United Kingdom) Leslie Graham	41 years, 270 days	1953 Isle of Man TT	125cc
7	(United Kingdom) Maurice Cann	41 years, 144 days	1952 Ulster Grand Prix	250cc
8	(Italy) Marcellino Lucchi	41 years, 65 days	1998 Italian Grand Prix	250cc
9	(United Kingdom) Freddie Frith	40 years, 82 days	1949 Ulster Grand Prix	350cc
10	(Australia) Jack Ahearn	39 years, 327 days	1964 Finnish Grand Prix	500cc

=== Longest Grand Prix winning span ===
	Rider	Time Span
1	(Italy) Valentino Rossi	20 years 311 days
2	(Italy) Loris Capirossi	17 years 49 days
3	(Spain) **Marc Márquez**	16 years 148 days
4	(Italy) Andrea Dovizioso	16 years 120 days
5	(Spain) Ángel Nieto	16 years 8 days
6	(Spain) Dani Pedrosa	15 years 136 days
7	(Spain) Jorge Lorenzo	14 years 326 days
8	(United Kingdom) Phil Read	14 years 71 days
9	(Switzerland) Thomas Lüthi	13 years 334 days
10	(France) **Johann Zarco**	13 years 221 days

=== Total MotoGP Sprint wins ===
	Rider	Wins
1	(Spain) **Marc Márquez**	25
2	(Spain) **Jorge Martín**	20
3	(Italy) **Francesco Bagnaia**	14
4	(Spain) **Álex Márquez**	6
5	(Italy) **Marco Bezzecchi**	4
6	(South Africa) **Brad Binder**	2
6	(Spain) **Maverick Viñales**	2
6	(Spain) **Aleix Espargaró**	2
6	(Italy) **Enea Bastianini**	2
6	(Spain) **Raúl Fernández**	2
6	(Spain) **Pedro Acosta**	2

== Podium finishes ==
=== Total podium finishes ===
	Rider	Podiums
1	(Italy) Valentino Rossi	235
2	(Spain) **Marc Márquez**	173
3	(Italy) Giacomo Agostini	159
4	(Spain) Dani Pedrosa	153
5	(Spain) Jorge Lorenzo	152
6	(Spain) Ángel Nieto	139
7	(United Kingdom) Phil Read	121
8	(United Kingdom) Mike Hailwood	112
9	(Italy) Max Biaggi	111
10	(Italy) Andrea Dovizioso	103

=== Youngest to score a podium finish ===
	Rider	Age	Place	Race	Class
1	(Venezuela) Iván Palazzese	15 years, 77 days	3rd	1977 Venezuelan Grand Prix	125cc
2	(Turkey) Can Öncü	15 years, 115 days	1st	2018 Valencian Grand Prix	Moto3
3	(Spain) **Marc Márquez**	15 years, 126 days	3rd	2008 British Grand Prix	125cc
4	(United Kingdom) Scott Redding	15 years, 170 days	1st	2008 British Grand Prix	125cc
5	(Germany) **Jonas Folger**	15 years, 277 days	2nd	2009 French Grand Prix	125cc
6	(Italy) Marco Melandri	15 years, 283 days	2nd	1998 Italian Grand Prix	125cc
7	(France) **Fabio Quartararo**	15 years, 283 days	2nd	2015 Grand Prix of the Americas	Moto3
8	(Spain) Dani Pedrosa	15 years, 359 days	3rd	2001 Valencian Grand Prix	125cc
9	(Spain) **David Muñoz**	16 years, 21 days	2nd	2022 Catalan Grand Prix	Moto3
10	(Italy) Romano Fenati	16 years, 84 days	2nd	2012 Qatar Grand Prix	Moto3

== Points ==
Throughout the history of the Grand Prix motorcycle racing World Championship, the points-scoring positions and the number of points awarded to each position have varied – see the List of FIM World Championship points scoring systems for details.

=== Total points ===
	Rider	Seasons	Points
1	(Italy) Valentino Rossi	1996–2021	6357
2	(Spain) **Marc Márquez**	2008–2026	5040
3	(Spain) Dani Pedrosa	2001–2018, 2021, 2023–2024	4207
4	(Spain) Jorge Lorenzo	2002–2019	3946
5	(Italy) Andrea Dovizioso	2001–2022	3796
6	(Italy) Loris Capirossi	1990–2011	3215
7	(Italy) Max Biaggi	1991–2005	2892
8	(Spain) **Maverick Viñales**	2011–2026	2828
9	(Italy) **Francesco Bagnaia**	2013–2026	2795
10	(Switzerland) Thomas Lüthi	2002–2021	2657

=== Most consecutive points finishes ===
	Rider	Points finishes	Races
1	(Italy) Giacomo Agostini	37	1967 500cc Nations Grand Prix–1969 500cc Ulster Grand Prix
1	(Australia) Mick Doohan	37	1995 500cc Italian Grand Prix–1997 500cc Indonesian Grand Prix
3	(Italy) Luca Cadalora	34	1990 250cc French Grand Prix–1992 250cc South African Grand Prix
3	(United States) Colin Edwards	34	2004 MotoGP Qatar Grand Prix–2006 MotoGP Malaysian Grand Prix
5	(Switzerland) Dominique Aegerter	33	2012 Moto2 Spanish Grand Prix–2013 Moto2 Valencian Grand Prix
6	(Italy) Andrea Dovizioso	31	2005 250cc Qatar Grand Prix–2007 250cc Czech Grand Prix
6	(Finland) Mika Kallio	31	2013 Moto2 French Grand Prix–2014 Moto2 Malaysian Grand Prix
8	(Australia) Wayne Gardner	30	1986 500cc West German Grand Prix–1988 500cc West German Grand Prix
8	(Italy) **Francesco Bagnaia**	30	2017 Moto2 Catalan Grand Prix–2018 Moto2 Valencian Grand Prix
10	(Germany) Ralf Waldmann	29	1996 250cc Indonesian Grand Prix–1997 250cc Australian Grand Prix

== Pole positions ==
=== Total pole positions ===
	Rider	Poles
1	(Spain) **Marc Márquez**	106
2	(Spain) Jorge Lorenzo	69
3	(Italy) Valentino Rossi	65
4	(Australia) Mick Doohan	58
5	(Italy) Max Biaggi	56
6	(Spain) Dani Pedrosa	49
7	(Spain) **Jorge Martín**	45
8	(Australia) Casey Stoner	43
9	(Italy) Loris Capirossi	41
10	(Italy) **Francesco Bagnaia**	35

=== Most consecutive pole positions ===
	Rider	Poles	Races
1	(Australia) Mick Doohan	12	1997 500cc Italian–1997 500cc Australian
2	(United States) Freddie Spencer	9	1985 500cc German–1985 500cc Swedish
3	(Italy) Pier Paolo Bianchi	8	1977 125cc Nations–1977 125cc Finnish
4	(Italy) Max Biaggi	7	1995 250cc German–1995 250cc Rio de Janeiro
4	(Australia) Casey Stoner	7	2008 MotoGP Catalan–2008 MotoGP San Marino
4	(Spain) **Marc Márquez**	7	2013 MotoGP Valencia–2014 MotoGP Italian
7	(Italy) Marco Lucchinelli	6	1981 500cc Nations–1981 500cc San Marino
7	(United States) Kevin Schwantz	6	1989 500cc Nations–1989 500cc Belgian
7	(Australia) Mick Doohan	6	1992 500cc Australian–1992 500cc German
7	(Australia) Mick Doohan	6	1995 500cc Australian–1995 500cc Italian

=== Most seasons with a pole position ===
	Rider	Seasons	Total
1	(Italy) Valentino Rossi	1996–1997, 2001–2010, 2014–2016, 2018	16
1	(Spain) **Marc Márquez**	2009–2019, 2022–2026	16
3	(Spain) Dani Pedrosa	2002–2015, 2017	15
3	(Spain) Jorge Lorenzo	2003–2016, 2018	15
5	(Italy) Max Biaggi	1992–2004	13
6	(Italy) Luca Cadalora	1985–1995	11
6	(Italy) Loris Capirossi	1991, 1993–1994, 1997–2001, 2003, 2005–2006	11
6	(Spain) **Maverick Viñales**	2011–2014, 2017–2021, 2023–2024	11
9	(Australia) Casey Stoner	2003–2012	10
10	(Italy) Pier Paolo Bianchi	1975–1978, 1980–1983, 1985	9
10	(Australia) Mick Doohan	1990–1998	9
10	(Italy) Andrea Dovizioso	2003–2004, 2006–2007, 2010, 2014–2016, 2018	9

== Fastest laps ==
=== Total fastest laps ===
	Rider	Fastest laps
1	(Italy) Giacomo Agostini	117
2	(Italy) Valentino Rossi	96
3	(Spain) **Marc Márquez**	92
4	(Spain) Ángel Nieto	81
5	(United Kingdom) Mike Hailwood	79
6	(Spain) Dani Pedrosa	64
7	(Australia) Mick Doohan	46
8	(Italy) Max Biaggi	42
9	(Spain) Jorge Lorenzo	37
10	(United Kingdom) Phil Read	36

== Riders' Championships ==
=== Total championships ===
	Rider	Titles	Seasons
1	(Italy) Giacomo Agostini	15	350cc – 1968, 1969, 1970, 1971, 1972, 1973, 1974; 500cc – 1966, 1967, 1968, 1969, 1970, 1971, 1972, 1975
2	(Spain) Ángel Nieto	13	50cc – 1969, 1970, 1972, 1975, 1976, 1977; 125cc – 1971, 1972, 1979, 1981, 1982, 1983, 1984
3	(Spain) **Marc Márquez**	10	125cc – 2010; Moto2 – 2012; MotoGP – 2013, 2014, 2016, 2017, 2018, 2019, 2025, 2026
4	(Italy) Carlo Ubbiali	9	125cc – 1951, 1955, 1956, 1958, 1959, 1960; 250cc – 1956, 1959, 1960
4	(United Kingdom) Mike Hailwood	9	250cc – 1961, 1966, 1967; 350cc – 1966, 1967; 500cc – 1962, 1963, 1964, 1965
4	(Italy) Valentino Rossi	9	125cc – 1997; 250cc – 1999; 500cc – 2001; MotoGP – 2002, 2003, 2004, 2005, 2008, 2009
8	(United Kingdom) John Surtees	7	350cc – 1958, 1959, 1960; 500cc – 1956, 1958, 1959, 1960
8	(United Kingdom) Phil Read	7	125cc – 1968; 250cc – 1964, 1965, 1968, 1971; 500cc – 1973, 1974
10	(United Kingdom) Geoff Duke	6	350cc – 1951, 1952; 500cc – 1951, 1953, 1954, 1955
10	(Rhodesia) Jim Redman	6	250cc – 1962, 1963; 350cc – 1962, 1963, 1964, 1965

=== Most consecutive championships ===
	Rider	Titles	Seasons
1	(Italy) Giacomo Agostini	12	1967 500cc, 1968–1972 350cc–500cc, 1973 350cc
2	(United Kingdom) Mike Hailwood	8	1962–1965 500cc, 1966–1967 250cc–350cc
3	(United Kingdom) Geoff Duke	6	1951 350cc–500cc, 1952 350cc, 1953–1955 500cc
3	(United Kingdom) John Surtees	6	1958 350cc–500cc, 1959 350cc–500cc, 1960 350cc–500cc
3	(Rhodesia) Jim Redman	6	1962–1963 250cc–350cc, 1964–1965 350cc
6	(Italy) Carlo Ubbiali	5	1958 125cc, 1959–1960 125cc–250cc
6	(Spain) Ángel Nieto	5	1969–1970 50cc, 1971 125cc, 1972 50cc–125cc
6	(Australia) Mick Doohan	5	1994–1998 500cc
6	(Italy) Valentino Rossi	5	2001 500cc, 2002–2005 MotoGP
10	(New Zealand) Hugh Anderson	4	1963 80cc–125cc, 1964 80cc, 1965 125cc
10	(Italy) Walter Villa	4	1974 250cc–350cc, 1975 250cc–350cc
10	(South Africa) Kork Ballington	4	1978 250cc–350cc, 1979 250cc–350cc
10	(United States) Kenny Roberts	4	1978–1979 500cc, 1980 750cc, 1981 500cc
10	(Germany) Anton Mang	4	1980 250cc, 1981 250cc–350cc, 1982 350cc
10	(Spain) Ángel Nieto	4	1981–1984 125cc
10	(Switzerland) Stefan Dörflinger	4	1982–1983 50cc, 1984–1985 80cc
10	(Spain) Jorge Martínez	4	1986–1987 80cc, 1988 80cc–125cc
10	(Italy) Max Biaggi	4	1994–1997 250cc
10	(Spain) **Marc Márquez**	4	2016–2019 MotoGP

=== Youngest World Riders' Champions ===
(at the time they clinched their first/only title)

	Rider	Age	Season	Class
1	(Italy) Loris Capirossi	17 years, 165 days	1990	125cc
2	(Spain) **Pedro Acosta**	17 years, 166 days	2021	Moto3
3	(Spain) **Marc Márquez**	17 years, 263 days	2010	125cc
4	(Spain) Dani Pedrosa	18 years, 13 days	2003	125cc
5	(Spain) **Izan Guevara**	18 years, 110 days	2022	Moto3
6	(Colombia) **David Alonso**	18 years, 163 days	2024	Moto3
7	(Italy) Valentino Rossi	18 years, 196 days	1997	125cc
8	(Spain) **Álex Márquez**	18 years, 200 days	2014	Moto3
9	(Italy) Andrea Dovizioso	18 years, 201 days	2004	125cc
10	(Spain) **Máximo Quiles**	18 years, 206 days	2026	Moto3

=== Oldest World Riders' Champions ===
(at the time they clinched their last/only title)

	Rider	Age	Season	Class
1	(Germany) Hermann Paul Müller	45 years, 287 days	1955	250cc
2	(United Kingdom) Fergus Anderson	45 years, 236 days	1954	350cc
3	(Italy) Enrico Lorenzetti	41 years, 254 days	1952	250cc
4	(United Kingdom) Freddie Frith	40 years, 82 days	1949	350cc
5	(Germany) Anton Mang	37 years, 349 days	1987	250cc
6	(United Kingdom) Leslie Graham	37 years, 340 days	1949	500cc
7	(Italy) Nello Pagani	37 years, 241 days	1949	125cc
8	(Spain) Ángel Nieto	37 years, 193 days	1984	125cc
9	(Switzerland) Luigi Taveri	36 years, 357 days	1966	125cc
10	(United Kingdom) Phil Read	35 years, 208 days	1974	500cc

== Other ==
Description	Record	Details
Longest Race distance in a day	440 Kms	(United Kingdom) Mike Hailwood (1966 Dutch TT in 250, 350, and 500cc three different categories)
Most wins in a single day	3	(Rhodesia) Jim Redman (1964 Dutch TT in 125, 250, and 500cc) (United Kingdom) Mike Hailwood (1966 Dutch TT in 250, 350, and 500cc)
Most different riders with a championship competing full-time in a season	14 (2022 MotoGP)	(Italy) Andrea Dovizioso (Italy) **Enea Bastianini** (Italy) **Francesco Bagnaia** (Italy) **Franco Morbidelli** (France) **Fabio Quartararo** (France) **Johann Zarco** (Spain) **Álex Márquez** (Spain) **Joan Mir** (Spain) **Jorge Martín** (Spain) **Maverick Viñales** (Spain) **Marc Márquez** (Spain) **Pol Espargaró** (South Africa) **Brad Binder** (Australia) Remy Gardner
A pair of brothers finishing 1st and 2nd in the World Championship standings	(2025 MotoGP)	(Spain) **Marc Márquez** (1st) (Spain) **Álex Márquez** (2nd)
Most races left in the season when becoming World Champion	5 races	(United Kingdom) Mike Hailwood (1966 250cc in round 7 of 12) (Italy) Giacomo Agostini (1969 500cc in round 7 of 12, 1970 500cc in round 6 of 11, 1971 500cc in round 6 of 11, 1972 500cc in round 8 of 13) (Spain) **Marc Márquez** (2025 MotoGP in round 17 of 22) (Note: Apart from 5 races there were 5 sprints also left in 2025 season for Márquez before he clinched the riders championship.) (Spain) **Máximo Quiles** (2026 Moto3 in round 17 of 22)
