= MotoGP Hall of Fame =

Hall of fame of Grand Prix motorcycle racing

The MotoGP Hall of Fame is the hall of fame of Grand Prix motorcycle racing. The current version of the Hall of Fame was established in 2025 and recognises the most successful riders to compete in the premier class of Grand Prix racing (500cc/MotoGP). There is a separate but related category known as the MotoGP Legends, which recognises a broader selection of people significant to the sport's history.

== History ==
The first version of a motorcycling Grand Prix "hall of fame" was established in 2000 as the World Championship Hall of Fame. The inaugural class of inductees were Giacomo Agostini, Mick Doohan, Mike Hailwood, Ángel Nieto, Wayne Rainey, Kenny Roberts, and Kevin Schwantz. There were no rules or restrictions for the selection of its membership. Later inductees included riders who died young, such as Marco Simoncelli, and people who impacted the sport off-track, such as Mike Trimby. The category also became known by an alternate name, the MotoGP Legends

In 2025, a new MotoGP Hall of Fame was announced to honour riders with a strong record of success in the premier class. Inductees to the modern Hall of Fame must have won at least two premier class titles and/or 25 premier class races. MotoGP CSO Carlos Ezpeleta said "there is a clear target to elevate the premier class of the sport as well as its champions and heritage.”

The original World Championship Hall of Fame, now known exclusively as the MotoGP Legends, remains in use as a less restricted gallery of recognition. All current Hall of Fame inductees are also MotoGP Legends.

== MotoGP Hall of Fame ==
Established in 2025 to honour riders who have won at least two titles and/or 25 races in the premier class (500cc/MotoGP). The only current member who met inclusion criteria without winning a premier class title is Dani Pedrosa.

Key
†	Rider was inducted posthumously

Year	Name	Nationality	500cc/MotoGP achievements	Ref.
2025	Giacomo Agostini	Italy	8-time 500cc World Champion (1966, 1967, 1968, 1969, 1970, 1971, 1972, 1975); 68 500cc race wins	
2025	Mick Doohan	Australia	5-time 500cc World Champion (1994, 1995, 1996, 1997, 1998); 54 500cc race wins	
2025	Geoff Duke†	United Kingdom	4-time 500cc World Champion (1951, 1953, 1954, 1955); 22 500cc race wins	
2025	Mike Hailwood†	United Kingdom	4-time 500cc World Champion (1962, 1963, 1964, 1965); 37 500cc race wins	
2025	Eddie Lawson	United States	4-time 500cc World Champion (1984, 1986, 1988, 1989); 31 500cc race wins	
2025	Jorge Lorenzo	Spain	3-time MotoGP World Champion (2010, 2012, 2015); 47 MotoGP race wins	
2025	Umberto Masetti†	Italy	2-time 500cc World Champion (1950, 1952); 6 500cc race wins	
2025	Dani Pedrosa	Spain	31 MotoGP race wins	
2025	Wayne Rainey	United States	3-time 500cc World Champion (1990, 1991, 1992); 24 500cc race wins	
2025	Phil Read†	United Kingdom	2-time 500cc World Champion (1973, 1974); 11 500cc race wins	
2025	Kenny Roberts	United States	3-time 500cc World Champion (1978, 1979, 1980); 22 500cc race wins	
2025	Valentino Rossi	Italy	6-time MotoGP World Champion (2002, 2003, 2004, 2005, 2008, 2009); 500cc World Champion (2001); 89 500cc/MotoGP race wins	
2025	Kevin Schwantz	United States	500cc World Champion (1993); 25 500cc race wins	
2025	Barry Sheene†	United Kingdom	2-time 500cc World Champion (1976, 1977); 19 500cc race wins	
2025	Freddie Spencer	United States	2-time 500cc World Champion (1983, 1985); 20 500cc race wins	
2025	Casey Stoner	Australia	2-time MotoGP World Champion (2007, 2011); 38 MotoGP race wins	
2025	John Surtees†	United Kingdom	4-time 500cc World Champion (1956, 1958, 1959, 1960); 22 500cc race wins	

== MotoGP Legends ==
This category, established in 2000, has no inclusion criteria and includes people who made an impact off-track as well as successful riders.

Out of the riders who have been inducted, Randy Mamola is the only one who never won a championship in any class. Nicky Hayden and Dani Pedrosa are the only MotoGP Legends to have started a race in MotoGP after being inducted in as a Legend.

Key
†	Rider was inducted posthumously

Year	Name	Nationality	Achievements	Ref.
2000	Giacomo Agostini	Italy	8-time 500cc World Champion (1966, 1967, 1968, 1969, 1970, 1971, 1972, 1975); 7-time 350cc World Champion (1968, 1969, 1970, 1971, 1972, 1973, 1974); A record 122 Grand Prix race wins (68 500cc race wins)	
2000	Mick Doohan	Australia	5-time 500cc World Champion (1994, 1995, 1996, 1997, 1998); 54 Grand Prix race wins (all in 500cc)	
2000	Mike Hailwood†	United Kingdom	4-time 500cc World Champion (1962, 1963, 1964, 1965); 2-time 350cc World Champion (1966, 1967); 3-time 250cc World Champion (1961, 1966, 1967); 76 Grand Prix race wins (37 500cc race wins)	
2000	Ángel Nieto	Spain	7-time 125cc World Champion (1971, 1972, 1979, 1981, 1982, 1983, 1984); 6-time 50cc World Champion (1969, 1970, 1972, 1975, 1976, 1977); 90 Grand Prix race wins	
2000	Wayne Rainey	United States	3-time 500cc World Champion (1990, 1991, 1992); 24 Grand Prix race wins (all in 500cc)	
2000	Kenny Roberts	United States	3-time 500cc World Champion (1978, 1979, 1980); 24 Grand Prix race wins (22 500cc race wins)	
2000	Kevin Schwantz	United States	500cc World Champion (1993); 25 Grand Prix race wins (all in 500cc)	
2001	Anton Mang	Germany	2-time 350cc World Champion (1981, 1982); 3-time 250cc World Champion (1980, 1981, 1987); 42 Grand Prix race wins	
2001	Barry Sheene	United Kingdom	2-time 500cc World Champion (1976, 1977); 23 Grand Prix race wins (19 500cc race wins)	
2001	Freddie Spencer	United States	2-time 500cc World Champion (1983, 1985); 250cc World Champion (1985); 27 Grand Prix race wins (20 500cc race wins)	
2001	Carlo Ubbiali	Italy	3-time 250cc World Champion (1956, 1959, 1960); 6-time 125cc World Champion (1951, 1955, 1956, 1958, 1959, 1960); 39 Grand Prix race wins	
2002	Geoff Duke	United Kingdom	4-time 500cc World Champion (1951, 1953, 1954, 1955); 2-time 350cc World Champion (1951, 1952); 33 Grand Prix race wins (22 500cc race wins)	
2002	Wayne Gardner	Australia	500cc World Champion (1987); 18 Grand Prix race wins (all in 500cc)	
2002	Phil Read	United Kingdom	2-time 500cc World Champion (1973, 1974); 4-time 250cc World Champion (1964, 1965, 1968, 1971); 125cc World Champion (1968); 52 Grand Prix race wins (11 500cc race wins)	
2003	Daijiro Kato†	Japan	250cc World Champion (2001); 17 Grand Prix race wins	
2003	John Surtees	United Kingdom	4-time 500cc World Champion (1956, 1958, 1959, 1960); 3-time 350cc World Champion (1958, 1959, 1960); 38 Grand Prix race wins (22 500cc race wins)	
2005	Eddie Lawson	United States	4-time 500cc World Champion (1984, 1986, 1988, 1989); 31 Grand Prix race wins (all in 500cc)	
2007	Jim Redman	Rhodesia	4-time 350cc World Champion (1962, 1963, 1964, 1965); 2-time 250cc World Champion (1962, 1963); 45 Grand Prix race wins (2 500cc race wins)	
2009	Jarno Saarinen†	Finland	250cc World Champion (1972); 15 Grand Prix race wins (2 500cc race wins)	
2013	Casey Stoner	Australia	2-time MotoGP World Champion (2007, 2011); 45 Grand Prix race wins (38 MotoGP race wins)	
2014	Marco Simoncelli†	Italy	250cc World Champion (2008); 14 Grand Prix race wins	
2015	Àlex Crivillé	Spain	500cc World Champion (1999); 125cc World Champion (1989); 20 Grand Prix race wins (15 500cc race wins)	
2015	Nicky Hayden	United States	MotoGP World Champion (2006); 3 Grand Prix race wins (all in MotoGP)	
2015	Franco Uncini	Italy	500cc World Champion (1982); 7 Grand Prix race wins (5 500cc race wins)	
2017	Marco Lucchinelli	Italy	500cc World Champion (1981); 6 Grand Prix race wins (all in 500cc)	
2017	Kenny Roberts Jr.	United States	500cc World Champion (2000); 8 Grand Prix race wins (all in 500cc)	
2018	Kork Ballington	South Africa	2-time 350cc World Champion (1978, 1979); 2-time 250cc World Champion (1978, 1979); 31 Grand Prix race wins	
2018	Randy Mamola	United States	4-time 500cc runner-up (1980, 1981, 1984, 1987); 13 Grand Prix race wins (all in 500cc)	
2018	Dani Pedrosa	Spain	2-time 250cc World Champion (2004, 2005); 125cc World Champion (2003); 54 Grand Prix race wins (31 MotoGP race wins)	
2019	Stefan Dörflinger	Switzerland	2-time 50cc World Champion (1982, 1983); 2-time 80cc World Champion (1984, 1985); 18 Grand Prix race wins	
2019	Jorge Martínez	Spain	125cc World Champion (1988); 3-time 80cc World Champion (1986, 1987, 1988); 37 Grand Prix race wins	
2021	Valentino Rossi	Italy	6-time MotoGP World Champion (2002, 2003, 2004, 2005, 2008, 2009); 500cc World Champion (2001); 250cc World Champion (1999); 125cc World Champion (1997); 115 Grand Prix race wins (A record 89 500cc/MotoGP race wins)	
2022	Hugh Anderson	New Zealand	2-time 125cc World Champion (1963, 1965); 2-time 50cc World Champion (1963, 1964); 25 Grand Prix race wins	
2022	Max Biaggi	Italy	4-time 250cc World Champion (1994, 1995, 1996, 1997); 42 Grand Prix race wins (13 MotoGP race wins)	
2022	Jorge Lorenzo	Spain	3-time MotoGP World Champion (2010, 2012, 2015); 2-time 250cc World Champion (2006, 2007); 68 Grand Prix race wins (47 MotoGP race wins)	
2022	Luigi Taveri†	Switzerland	3-time 125cc World Champion (1962, 1964, 1966); 30 Grand Prix race wins	
2023	Hans-Georg Anscheidt	Germany	3-time 50cc World Champion (1966, 1967, 1968); 14 Grand Prix race wins	
2023	Andrea Dovizioso	Italy	3-time MotoGP runner-up (2017, 2018, 2019); 125cc World Champion (2004); 24 Grand Prix race wins (15 MotoGP race wins)	
2024	Mike Trimby	United Kingdom	Founder and CEO of the International Road Racing Teams Association (IRTA); Honoured for his track safety advocacy	
2026	Loris Capirossi	Italy	250cc World Champion (1998); 2-time 125cc World Champion (1990, 1991); 29 Grand Prix race wins (9 500cc/MotoGP race wins)	
2026	Umberto Masetti	Italy	2-time 500cc World Champion (1950, 1952); 6 Grand Prix race wins (all in 500cc)	
