= List of Grand Prix motorcycle racing World Riders' Champions =

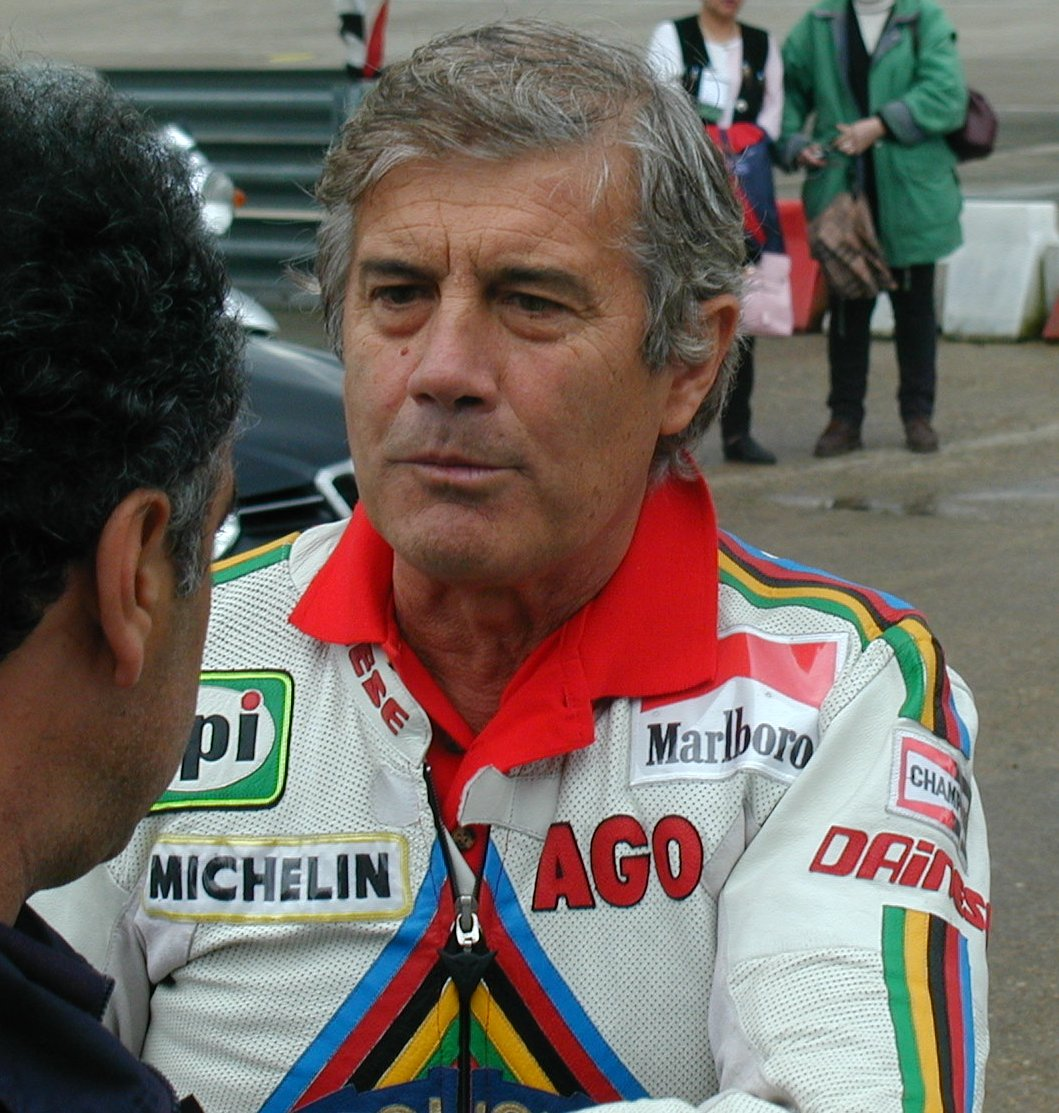
Giacomo Agostini, who won 15 world championships in motorcycle racing

Grand Prix motorcycle racing is the premier championship of motorcycle road racing, which has been divided into three classes: MotoGP, Moto2, and Moto3. Former classes that have been discontinued include 350cc, 250cc, 125cc, 50cc/80cc, MotoE, and Sidecar. The Grand Prix Road-Racing World Championship was established in 1949 by the sport's governing body, the Fédération Internationale de Motocyclisme (FIM), and is the oldest motorsport world championship in existence.

There were five classes when the championship started in 1949: 500cc, 350cc, 250cc, 125cc, and sidecar (600cc). The 50cc class was introduced in the 1962 season. Due to escalating costs that resulted in a number of manufacturers leaving the championship, the FIM limited the 50cc bikes to a single cylinder, the 125cc and 250cc bikes were limited to two cylinders, and the 350cc and 500cc bikes were limited to four cylinders. The 350cc class was discontinued after 1982; two years later the 50cc class was replaced with an 80cc class, which was discontinued after 1989. In 2002, 990cc bikes replaced the 500cc bikes and the class was renamed as MotoGP. 600cc bikes replaced the 250cc bikes in the 2010 season, with the class re-branded as Moto2. In 2012, 250cc bikes replaced the 125cc bikes, with the class re-branded as Moto3, retiring the two-stroke bikes from Grand Prix motorcycle racing. MotoE was introduced in 2019 as a "World Cup" until 2022 and thus statistics from that time span are not included here. MotoE only gained World Championship status from 2023 until 2025, because MotoE class went on hiatus after the 2025 season.

Giacomo Agostini, with 15 titles, is the rider with the most world championships across any class. Ángel Nieto is second with 13 titles, and Marc Márquez is third with 10 titles. Agostini and Márquez have won the most 500cc/MotoGP championships, with eight titles each, while Agostini holds the record in the 350cc class, with seven titles. Phil Read and Max Biaggi have won the most 250cc/Moto2 championships, with four titles each. Nieto won the most championships in the 125cc/Moto3 and 50/80cc classes, with seven and six titles respectively.

== Champions by rider ==
Grand Prix motorcycle racing world champions by rider
| Rank | Rider | Country | Winning span | 500cc/MotoGP | 350cc | 250cc/Moto2 | 125cc/Moto3 | 50/80cc | MotoE | Total |
|---|---|---|---|---|---|---|---|---|---|---|
| 1 | Giacomo Agostini | Italy | 1966–1975 | 8 | 7 | 0 | 0 | 0 | 0 | 15 |
| 2 | Ángel Nieto | Spain | 1969–1984 | 0 | 0 | 0 | 7 | 6 | 0 | 13 |
| 3 | Marc Márquez | Spain | 2010–2026 | 8 | 0 | 1 | 1 | 0 | 0 | 10 |
| 4 | Valentino Rossi | Italy | 1997–2009 | 7 | 0 | 1 | 1 | 0 | 0 | 9 |
| 5 | Mike Hailwood | United Kingdom | 1961–1967 | 4 | 2 | 3 | 0 | 0 | 0 | 9 |
| 6 | Carlo Ubbiali | Italy | 1951–1960 | 0 | 0 | 3 | 6 | 0 | 0 | 9 |
| 7 | John Surtees | United Kingdom | 1956–1960 | 4 | 3 | 0 | 0 | 0 | 0 | 7 |
| 8 | Phil Read | United Kingdom | 1964–1974 | 2 | 0 | 4 | 1 | 0 | 0 | 7 |
| 9 | Geoff Duke | United Kingdom | 1951–1955 | 4 | 2 | 0 | 0 | 0 | 0 | 6 |
| 10 | Jim Redman | Rhodesia | 1962–1965 | 0 | 4 | 2 | 0 | 0 | 0 | 6 |
| 11 | Mick Doohan | Australia | 1994–1998 | 5 | 0 | 0 | 0 | 0 | 0 | 5 |
| 12 | Jorge Lorenzo | Spain | 2006–2015 | 3 | 0 | 2 | 0 | 0 | 0 | 5 |
| 13 | Anton Mang | Germany | 1980–1987 | 0 | 2 | 3 | 0 | 0 | 0 | 5 |
| 14 | Eddie Lawson | United States | 1984–1989 | 4 | 0 | 0 | 0 | 0 | 0 | 4 |
| 15 | Kork Ballington | South Africa | 1978–1979 | 0 | 2 | 2 | 0 | 0 | 0 | 4 |
| 16 | Walter Villa | Italy | 1974–1976 | 0 | 1 | 3 | 0 | 0 | 0 | 4 |
| 17 | Max Biaggi | Italy | 1994–1997 | 0 | 0 | 4 | 0 | 0 | 0 | 4 |
| 18 | Hugh Anderson | New Zealand | 1963–1965 | 0 | 0 | 0 | 2 | 2 | 0 | 4 |
| 19 | Jorge Martínez | Spain | 1986–1988 | 0 | 0 | 0 | 1 | 3 | 0 | 4 |
| 20 | Stefan Dörflinger | Switzerland | 1982–1985 | 0 | 0 | 0 | 0 | 4 | 0 | 4 |
| 21 | Kenny Roberts | United States | 1978–1980 | 3 | 0 | 0 | 0 | 0 | 0 | 3 |
| 21 | Wayne Rainey | United States | 1990–1992 | 3 | 0 | 0 | 0 | 0 | 0 | 3 |
| 23 | Freddie Spencer | United States | 1983–1985 | 2 | 0 | 1 | 0 | 0 | 0 | 3 |
| 23 | Francesco Bagnaia | Italy | 2018–2023 | 2 | 0 | 1 | 0 | 0 | 0 | 3 |
| 25 | Bruno Ruffo | Italy | 1949–1951 | 0 | 0 | 2 | 1 | 0 | 0 | 3 |
| 25 | Werner Haas | Germany | 1953–1954 | 0 | 0 | 2 | 1 | 0 | 0 | 3 |
| 25 | Luca Cadalora | Italy | 1986–1992 | 0 | 0 | 2 | 1 | 0 | 0 | 3 |
| 25 | Dani Pedrosa | Spain | 2003–2005 | 0 | 0 | 2 | 1 | 0 | 0 | 3 |
| 29 | Loris Capirossi | Italy | 1990–1998 | 0 | 0 | 1 | 2 | 0 | 0 | 3 |
| 30 | Luigi Taveri | Switzerland | 1962–1966 | 0 | 0 | 0 | 3 | 0 | 0 | 3 |
| 30 | Pier Paolo Bianchi | Italy | 1976–1980 | 0 | 0 | 0 | 3 | 0 | 0 | 3 |
| 32 | Eugenio Lazzarini | Italy | 1978–1980 | 0 | 0 | 0 | 1 | 2 | 0 | 3 |
| 33 | Hans-Georg Anscheidt | Germany | 1966–1968 | 0 | 0 | 0 | 0 | 3 | 0 | 3 |
| 34 | Umberto Masetti | Italy | 1950–1952 | 2 | 0 | 0 | 0 | 0 | 0 | 2 |
| 34 | Barry Sheene | United Kingdom | 1976–1977 | 2 | 0 | 0 | 0 | 0 | 0 | 2 |
| 34 | Casey Stoner | Australia | 2007–2011 | 2 | 0 | 0 | 0 | 0 | 0 | 2 |
| 37 | Gary Hocking | Rhodesia and Nyasaland | 1961 | 1 | 1 | 0 | 0 | 0 | 0 | 2 |
| 38 | Àlex Crivillé | Spain | 1989–1999 | 1 | 0 | 0 | 1 | 0 | 0 | 2 |
| 38 | Joan Mir | Spain | 2017–2020 | 1 | 0 | 0 | 1 | 0 | 0 | 2 |
| 38 | Jorge Martín | Spain | 2018–2024 | 1 | 0 | 0 | 1 | 0 | 0 | 2 |
| 41 | Fergus Anderson | United Kingdom | 1953–1954 | 0 | 2 | 0 | 0 | 0 | 0 | 2 |
| 41 | Bill Lomas | United Kingdom | 1955–1956 | 0 | 2 | 0 | 0 | 0 | 0 | 2 |
| 43 | Carlos Lavado | Venezuela | 1983–1986 | 0 | 0 | 2 | 0 | 0 | 0 | 2 |
| 43 | Sito Pons | Spain | 1988–1989 | 0 | 0 | 2 | 0 | 0 | 0 | 2 |
| 43 | Johann Zarco | France | 2015–2016 | 0 | 0 | 2 | 0 | 0 | 0 | 2 |
| 46 | Cecil Sandford | United Kingdom | 1952–1957 | 0 | 0 | 1 | 1 | 0 | 0 | 2 |
| 46 | Tarquinio Provini | Italy | 1957–1958 | 0 | 0 | 1 | 1 | 0 | 0 | 2 |
| 46 | Dieter Braun | Germany | 1970–1973 | 0 | 0 | 1 | 1 | 0 | 0 | 2 |
| 46 | Manuel Poggiali | San Marino | 2001–2003 | 0 | 0 | 1 | 1 | 0 | 0 | 2 |
| 46 | Álex Márquez | Spain | 2014–2019 | 0 | 0 | 1 | 1 | 0 | 0 | 2 |
| 46 | Pedro Acosta | Spain | 2021–2023 | 0 | 0 | 1 | 1 | 0 | 0 | 2 |
| 52 | Kent Andersson | Sweden | 1973–1974 | 0 | 0 | 0 | 2 | 0 | 0 | 2 |
| 52 | Fausto Gresini | Italy | 1985–1987 | 0 | 0 | 0 | 2 | 0 | 0 | 2 |
| 52 | Haruchika Aoki | Japan | 1995–1996 | 0 | 0 | 0 | 2 | 0 | 0 | 2 |
| 52 | Kazuto Sakata | Japan | 1994–1998 | 0 | 0 | 0 | 2 | 0 | 0 | 2 |
| 56 | Jan de Vries | Netherlands | 1971–1973 | 0 | 0 | 0 | 0 | 2 | 0 | 2 |
| 56 | Ricardo Tormo | Spain | 1978–1981 | 0 | 0 | 0 | 0 | 2 | 0 | 2 |
| 58 | Leslie Graham | United Kingdom | 1949 | 1 | 0 | 0 | 0 | 0 | 0 | 1 |
| 58 | Libero Liberati | Italy | 1957 | 1 | 0 | 0 | 0 | 0 | 0 | 1 |
| 58 | Marco Lucchinelli | Italy | 1981 | 1 | 0 | 0 | 0 | 0 | 0 | 1 |
| 58 | Franco Uncini | Italy | 1982 | 1 | 0 | 0 | 0 | 0 | 0 | 1 |
| 58 | Wayne Gardner | Australia | 1987 | 1 | 0 | 0 | 0 | 0 | 0 | 1 |
| 58 | Kevin Schwantz | United States | 1993 | 1 | 0 | 0 | 0 | 0 | 0 | 1 |
| 58 | Kenny Roberts Jr. | United States | 2000 | 1 | 0 | 0 | 0 | 0 | 0 | 1 |
| 58 | Nicky Hayden | United States | 2006 | 1 | 0 | 0 | 0 | 0 | 0 | 1 |
| 58 | Fabio Quartararo | France | 2021 | 1 | 0 | 0 | 0 | 0 | 0 | 1 |
| 67 | Freddie Frith | United Kingdom | 1949 | 0 | 1 | 0 | 0 | 0 | 0 | 1 |
| 67 | Bob Foster | United Kingdom | 1950 | 0 | 1 | 0 | 0 | 0 | 0 | 1 |
| 67 | Keith Campbell | Australia | 1957 | 0 | 1 | 0 | 0 | 0 | 0 | 1 |
| 67 | Johnny Cecotto | Venezuela | 1975 | 0 | 1 | 0 | 0 | 0 | 0 | 1 |
| 67 | Takazumi Katayama | Japan | 1977 | 0 | 1 | 0 | 0 | 0 | 0 | 1 |
| 67 | Jon Ekerold | South Africa | 1980 | 0 | 1 | 0 | 0 | 0 | 0 | 1 |
| 73 | Dario Ambrosini | Italy | 1950 | 0 | 0 | 1 | 0 | 0 | 0 | 1 |
| 73 | Enrico Lorenzetti | Italy | 1952 | 0 | 0 | 1 | 0 | 0 | 0 | 1 |
| 73 | Hermann Paul Müller | Germany | 1955 | 0 | 0 | 1 | 0 | 0 | 0 | 1 |
| 73 | Kel Carruthers | Australia | 1969 | 0 | 0 | 1 | 0 | 0 | 0 | 1 |
| 73 | Rodney Gould | United Kingdom | 1970 | 0 | 0 | 1 | 0 | 0 | 0 | 1 |
| 73 | Jarno Saarinen | Finland | 1972 | 0 | 0 | 1 | 0 | 0 | 0 | 1 |
| 73 | Mario Lega | Italy | 1977 | 0 | 0 | 1 | 0 | 0 | 0 | 1 |
| 73 | Jean-Louis Tournadre | France | 1982 | 0 | 0 | 1 | 0 | 0 | 0 | 1 |
| 73 | Christian Sarron | France | 1984 | 0 | 0 | 1 | 0 | 0 | 0 | 1 |
| 73 | John Kocinski | United States | 1990 | 0 | 0 | 1 | 0 | 0 | 0 | 1 |
| 73 | Tetsuya Harada | Japan | 1993 | 0 | 0 | 1 | 0 | 0 | 0 | 1 |
| 73 | Olivier Jacque | France | 2000 | 0 | 0 | 1 | 0 | 0 | 0 | 1 |
| 73 | Daijiro Kato | Japan | 2001 | 0 | 0 | 1 | 0 | 0 | 0 | 1 |
| 73 | Marco Melandri | Italy | 2002 | 0 | 0 | 1 | 0 | 0 | 0 | 1 |
| 73 | Marco Simoncelli | Italy | 2008 | 0 | 0 | 1 | 0 | 0 | 0 | 1 |
| 73 | Hiroshi Aoyama | Japan | 2009 | 0 | 0 | 1 | 0 | 0 | 0 | 1 |
| 73 | Toni Elías | Spain | 2010 | 0 | 0 | 1 | 0 | 0 | 0 | 1 |
| 73 | Stefan Bradl | Germany | 2011 | 0 | 0 | 1 | 0 | 0 | 0 | 1 |
| 73 | Pol Espargaró | Spain | 2013 | 0 | 0 | 1 | 0 | 0 | 0 | 1 |
| 73 | Tito Rabat | Spain | 2014 | 0 | 0 | 1 | 0 | 0 | 0 | 1 |
| 73 | Franco Morbidelli | Italy | 2017 | 0 | 0 | 1 | 0 | 0 | 0 | 1 |
| 73 | Enea Bastianini | Italy | 2020 | 0 | 0 | 1 | 0 | 0 | 0 | 1 |
| 73 | Remy Gardner | Australia | 2021 | 0 | 0 | 1 | 0 | 0 | 0 | 1 |
| 73 | Augusto Fernández | Spain | 2022 | 0 | 0 | 1 | 0 | 0 | 0 | 1 |
| 73 | Ai Ogura | Japan | 2024 | 0 | 0 | 1 | 0 | 0 | 0 | 1 |
| 73 | Diogo Moreira | Brazil | 2025 | 0 | 0 | 1 | 0 | 0 | 0 | 1 |
| 99 | Nello Pagani | Italy | 1949 | 0 | 0 | 0 | 1 | 0 | 0 | 1 |
| 99 | Rupert Hollaus | Austria | 1954 | 0 | 0 | 0 | 1 | 0 | 0 | 1 |
| 99 | Tom Phillis | Australia | 1961 | 0 | 0 | 0 | 1 | 0 | 0 | 1 |
| 99 | Bill Ivy | United Kingdom | 1967 | 0 | 0 | 0 | 1 | 0 | 0 | 1 |
| 99 | Dave Simmonds | United Kingdom | 1969 | 0 | 0 | 0 | 1 | 0 | 0 | 1 |
| 99 | Paolo Pileri | Italy | 1975 | 0 | 0 | 0 | 1 | 0 | 0 | 1 |
| 99 | Alessandro Gramigni | Italy | 1992 | 0 | 0 | 0 | 1 | 0 | 0 | 1 |
| 99 | Dirk Raudies | Germany | 1993 | 0 | 0 | 0 | 1 | 0 | 0 | 1 |
| 99 | Emilio Alzamora | Spain | 1999 | 0 | 0 | 0 | 1 | 0 | 0 | 1 |
| 99 | Roberto Locatelli | Italy | 2000 | 0 | 0 | 0 | 1 | 0 | 0 | 1 |
| 99 | Arnaud Vincent | France | 2002 | 0 | 0 | 0 | 1 | 0 | 0 | 1 |
| 99 | Andrea Dovizioso | Italy | 2004 | 0 | 0 | 0 | 1 | 0 | 0 | 1 |
| 99 | Thomas Lüthi | Switzerland | 2005 | 0 | 0 | 0 | 1 | 0 | 0 | 1 |
| 99 | Álvaro Bautista | Spain | 2006 | 0 | 0 | 0 | 1 | 0 | 0 | 1 |
| 99 | Gábor Talmácsi | Hungary | 2007 | 0 | 0 | 0 | 1 | 0 | 0 | 1 |
| 99 | Mike Di Meglio | France | 2008 | 0 | 0 | 0 | 1 | 0 | 0 | 1 |
| 99 | Julián Simón | Spain | 2009 | 0 | 0 | 0 | 1 | 0 | 0 | 1 |
| 99 | Nicolás Terol | Spain | 2011 | 0 | 0 | 0 | 1 | 0 | 0 | 1 |
| 99 | Sandro Cortese | Germany | 2012 | 0 | 0 | 0 | 1 | 0 | 0 | 1 |
| 99 | Maverick Viñales | Spain | 2013 | 0 | 0 | 0 | 1 | 0 | 0 | 1 |
| 99 | Danny Kent | United Kingdom | 2015 | 0 | 0 | 0 | 1 | 0 | 0 | 1 |
| 99 | Brad Binder | South Africa | 2016 | 0 | 0 | 0 | 1 | 0 | 0 | 1 |
| 99 | Lorenzo Dalla Porta | Italy | 2019 | 0 | 0 | 0 | 1 | 0 | 0 | 1 |
| 99 | Albert Arenas | Spain | 2020 | 0 | 0 | 0 | 1 | 0 | 0 | 1 |
| 99 | Izan Guevara | Spain | 2022 | 0 | 0 | 0 | 1 | 0 | 0 | 1 |
| 99 | Jaume Masià | Spain | 2023 | 0 | 0 | 0 | 1 | 0 | 0 | 1 |
| 99 | David Alonso | Colombia | 2024 | 0 | 0 | 0 | 1 | 0 | 0 | 1 |
| 99 | José Antonio Rueda | Spain | 2025 | 0 | 0 | 0 | 1 | 0 | 0 | 1 |
| 99 | Máximo Quiles | Spain | 2026 | 0 | 0 | 0 | 1 | 0 | 0 | 1 |
| 128 | Ernst Degner | Germany | 1962 | 0 | 0 | 0 | 0 | 1 | 0 | 1 |
| 128 | Ralph Bryans | United Kingdom | 1965 | 0 | 0 | 0 | 0 | 1 | 0 | 1 |
| 128 | Henk van Kessel | Netherlands | 1974 | 0 | 0 | 0 | 0 | 1 | 0 | 1 |
| 128 | Manuel Herreros | Spain | 1989 | 0 | 0 | 0 | 0 | 1 | 0 | 1 |
| 132 | Mattia Casadei | Italy | 2023 | 0 | 0 | 0 | 0 | 0 | 1 | 1 |
| 132 | Héctor Garzó | Spain | 2024 | 0 | 0 | 0 | 0 | 0 | 1 | 1 |
| 132 | Alessandro Zaccone | Italy | 2025 | 0 | 0 | 0 | 0 | 0 | 1 | 1 |
| Total | | | | 78 | 34 | 77 | 78 | 28 | 3 | 298 |

== Champions by country ==
Grand Prix motorcycle racing world champions by country
| Country | MotoGP/500cc | 350cc | Moto2/250cc | Moto3/125cc | 80cc/50cc | MotoE | Total |
|---|---|---|---|---|---|---|---|
| Italy | 22 | 8 | 25 | 24 | 2 | 2 | 83 |
| Spain | 14 | 0 | 13 | 25 | 12 | 1 | 65 |
| United Kingdom | 17 | 13 | 9 | 5 | 1 | 0 | 45 |
| Germany | 0 | 2 | 8 | 4 | 4 | 0 | 18 |
| United States | 15 | 0 | 2 | 0 | 0 | 0 | 17 |
| Australia | 8 | 1 | 2 | 1 | 0 | 0 | 12 |
| Japan | 0 | 1 | 4 | 4 | 0 | 0 | 9 |
| Rhodesia | 1 | 5 | 2 | 0 | 0 | 0 | 8 |
| France | 1 | 0 | 5 | 2 | 0 | 0 | 8 |
| Switzerland | 0 | 0 | 0 | 4 | 4 | 0 | 8 |
| South Africa | 0 | 3 | 2 | 1 | 0 | 0 | 6 |
| New Zealand | 0 | 0 | 0 | 2 | 2 | 0 | 4 |
| Venezuela | 0 | 1 | 2 | 0 | 0 | 0 | 3 |
| Netherlands | 0 | 0 | 0 | 0 | 3 | 0 | 3 |
| San Marino | 0 | 0 | 1 | 1 | 0 | 0 | 2 |
| Sweden | 0 | 0 | 0 | 2 | 0 | 0 | 2 |
| Finland | 0 | 0 | 1 | 0 | 0 | 0 | 1 |
| Brazil | 0 | 0 | 1 | 0 | 0 | 0 | 1 |
| Austria | 0 | 0 | 0 | 1 | 0 | 0 | 1 |
| Hungary | 0 | 0 | 0 | 1 | 0 | 0 | 1 |
| Colombia | 0 | 0 | 0 | 1 | 0 | 0 | 1 |
| Total | 78 | 34 | 77 | 78 | 28 | 3 | 298 |

== See also ==
- List of Grand Prix motorcycle racing World Riders' Champions by year
