= List of Grand Prix motorcycle racing World Riders' Champions by year =

The following is a list of FIM Grand Prix motorcycle racing World Champions from 1949, in order of class and year.

== Summary ==
Grand Prix motorcycle racing is the premier championship of motorcycle road racing, which has been divided into three classes: MotoGP, Moto2, and Moto3. Classes that have been discontinued include Formula 750, 500cc, 350cc, 250cc, 125cc, 80cc, 50cc, MotoE, and Sidecar. The Grand Prix Road-Racing World Championship was established in 1949 by the sport's governing body, the Fédération Internationale de Motocyclisme (FIM), and is the oldest motorsport world championship in existence.

There were five classes when the championship started in 1949: 500cc, 350cc, 250cc, 125cc, and sidecar (600cc). The 50cc class was introduced in 1962. Due to escalating costs that resulted in a number of manufacturers leaving the championship, the FIM limited the 50cc bikes to a single cylinder, the 125cc and 250cc bikes were limited to two cylinders, and the 350cc and 500cc bikes were limited to four cylinders. The 350cc class was discontinued after 1982, two years later the 50cc class was replaced with an 80cc class, which was discontinued after 1989. The sidecar class left the series to form its own championship after 1996. In 2002, 990cc bikes replaced the 500cc bikes and the class was renamed as MotoGP. 600cc bikes replaced the 250cc bikes in 2010, with the class rebranded as Moto2. Starting 2012, the Moto3 class (250cc one cylinder) replaced the 125cc class.

The 750 FIM Prize became a world championship from 1977 until 1979 after a favourable vote from the FIM general council.

Sidecars had 600 cc engines in the first two years, after which they were replaced by 500cc engines. In 1979 the FIM created a prototype sidecar class named B2B, as opposed to the traditional B2A. Prototypes were banned in 1980, but from 1981 onwards prototypes were allowed again, this time without having a separate class.

MotoE was introduced in 2019 as a "World Cup" until 2022 and thus statistics from that time span are not included here. MotoE only gained World Championship status from 2023 until 2025, because MotoE class went on hiatus after the 2025 season.

The Riders' World Championship is awarded to the most successful rider over a season, as determined by a points system based on Grand Prix results. The constructors listed in this table are the bike that the world champions rode during that winning season and are not necessarily the winner of the constructors' world championship in that season. For sidecar champions, the passenger name is in italics.

== List ==
Year	500cc	350cc	250cc	125cc	Sidecar
1949	(United Kingdom) Leslie Graham (AJS)	(United Kingdom) Freddie Frith (Velocette)	(Italy) Bruno Ruffo (Moto Guzzi)	(Italy) Nello Pagani (Mondial)	(United Kingdom) Eric Oliver (United Kingdom) Denis Jenkinson (Norton)
1950	(Italy) Umberto Masetti (Gilera)	(United Kingdom) Bob Foster (Velocette)	(Italy) Dario Ambrosini (Benelli)	(Italy) Bruno Ruffo (Mondial)	(United Kingdom) Eric Oliver (Italy) Lorenzo Dobelli (Norton)
1951	(United Kingdom) Geoff Duke (Norton)	(United Kingdom) Geoff Duke (Norton)	(Italy) Bruno Ruffo (Moto Guzzi)	(Italy) Carlo Ubbiali (Mondial)	(United Kingdom) Eric Oliver (Italy) Lorenzo Dobelli (Norton)
1952	(Italy) Umberto Masetti (Gilera)	(United Kingdom) Geoff Duke (Norton)	(Italy) Enrico Lorenzetti (Moto Guzzi)	(United Kingdom) Cecil Sandford (MV Agusta)	(United Kingdom) Cyril Smith (United Kingdom) Bob Clements (United Kingdom) Les Nutt (Norton)
1953	(United Kingdom) Geoff Duke (Gilera)	(United Kingdom) Fergus Anderson (Moto Guzzi)	(West Germany) Werner Haas (NSU)	(West Germany) Werner Haas (NSU)	(United Kingdom) Eric Oliver (United Kingdom) Stanley Dibben (Norton)
1954	(United Kingdom) Geoff Duke (Gilera)	(United Kingdom) Fergus Anderson (Moto Guzzi)	(West Germany) Werner Haas (NSU)	(Austria) Rupert Hollaus (NSU)	(West Germany) Wilhelm Noll (West Germany) Fritz Cron (BMW)
1955	(United Kingdom) Geoff Duke (Gilera)	(United Kingdom) Bill Lomas (Moto Guzzi)	(West Germany) Hermann Paul Müller (NSU)	(Italy) Carlo Ubbiali (MV Agusta)	(West Germany) Willi Faust (West Germany) Karl Remmert (BMW)
1956	(United Kingdom) John Surtees (MV Agusta)	(United Kingdom) Bill Lomas (Moto Guzzi)	(Italy) Carlo Ubbiali (MV Agusta)	(Italy) Carlo Ubbiali (MV Agusta)	(West Germany) Wilhelm Noll (West Germany) Fritz Cron (BMW)
1957	(Italy) Libero Liberati (Gilera)	(Australia) Keith Campbell (Moto Guzzi)	(United Kingdom) Cecil Sandford (Mondial)	(Italy) Tarquinio Provini (Mondial)	(West Germany) Fritz Hillebrand (West Germany) Manfred Grunwahl (BMW)
1958	(United Kingdom) John Surtees (MV Agusta)	(United Kingdom) John Surtees (MV Agusta)	(Italy) Tarquinio Provini (MV Agusta)	(Italy) Carlo Ubbiali (MV Agusta)	(West Germany) Walter Schneider (West Germany) Hans Strauß (BMW)
1959	(United Kingdom) John Surtees (MV Agusta)	(United Kingdom) John Surtees (MV Agusta)	(Italy) Carlo Ubbiali (MV Agusta)	(Italy) Carlo Ubbiali (MV Agusta)	(West Germany) Walter Schneider (West Germany) Hans Strauß (BMW)
1960	(United Kingdom) John Surtees (MV Agusta)	(United Kingdom) John Surtees (MV Agusta)	(Italy) Carlo Ubbiali (MV Agusta)	(Italy) Carlo Ubbiali (MV Agusta)	(West Germany) Helmut Fath (West Germany) Alfred Wohlgemuth (BMW)
1961	(Federation of Rhodesia and Nyasaland) Gary Hocking (MV Agusta)	(Federation of Rhodesia and Nyasaland) Gary Hocking (MV Agusta)	(United Kingdom) Mike Hailwood (Honda)	(Australia) Tom Phillis (Honda)	(West Germany) Max Deubel (West Germany) Emil Hörner (BMW)

Year	500cc	350cc	250cc	125cc	50cc	Sidecar
1962	(United Kingdom) Mike Hailwood (MV Agusta)	(Federation of Rhodesia and Nyasaland) Jim Redman (Honda)	(Federation of Rhodesia and Nyasaland) Jim Redman (Honda)	(Switzerland) Luigi Taveri (Honda)	(West Germany) Ernst Degner (Suzuki)	(West Germany) Max Deubel (West Germany) Emil Hörner (BMW)
1963	(United Kingdom) Mike Hailwood (MV Agusta)	(Federation of Rhodesia and Nyasaland) Jim Redman (Honda)	(Federation of Rhodesia and Nyasaland) Jim Redman (Honda)	(New Zealand) Hugh Anderson (Suzuki)	(New Zealand) Hugh Anderson (Suzuki)	(West Germany) Max Deubel (West Germany) Emil Hörner (BMW)
1964	(United Kingdom) Mike Hailwood (MV Agusta)	(Rhodesia) Jim Redman (Honda)	(United Kingdom) Phil Read (Yamaha)	(Switzerland) Luigi Taveri (Honda)	(New Zealand) Hugh Anderson (Suzuki)	(West Germany) Max Deubel (West Germany) Emil Hörner (BMW)
1965	(United Kingdom) Mike Hailwood (MV Agusta)	(Rhodesia) Jim Redman (Honda)	(United Kingdom) Phil Read (Yamaha)	(New Zealand) Hugh Anderson (Suzuki)	(United Kingdom) Ralph Bryans (Honda)	(Switzerland) Fritz Scheidegger (United Kingdom) John Robinson (BMW)
1966	(Italy) Giacomo Agostini (MV Agusta)	(United Kingdom) Mike Hailwood (Honda)	(United Kingdom) Mike Hailwood (Honda)	(Switzerland) Luigi Taveri (Honda)	(West Germany) Hans-Georg Anscheidt (Suzuki)	(Switzerland) Fritz Scheidegger (United Kingdom) John Robinson (BMW)
1967	(Italy) Giacomo Agostini (MV Agusta)	(United Kingdom) Mike Hailwood (Honda)	(United Kingdom) Mike Hailwood (Honda)	(United Kingdom) Bill Ivy (Yamaha)	(West Germany) Hans-Georg Anscheidt (Suzuki)	(West Germany) Klaus Enders (West Germany) Ralf Engelhardt (BMW)
1968	(Italy) Giacomo Agostini (MV Agusta)	(Italy) Giacomo Agostini (MV Agusta)	(United Kingdom) Phil Read (Yamaha)	(United Kingdom) Phil Read (Yamaha)	(West Germany) Hans-Georg Anscheidt (Suzuki)	(West Germany) Helmut Fath (West Germany) Wolfgang Kalauch (URS)
1969	(Italy) Giacomo Agostini (MV Agusta)	(Italy) Giacomo Agostini (MV Agusta)	(Australia) Kel Carruthers (Benelli)	(United Kingdom) Dave Simmonds (Kawasaki)	(Spain) Ángel Nieto (Derbi)	(West Germany) Klaus Enders (West Germany) Ralf Engelhardt (BMW)
1970	(Italy) Giacomo Agostini (MV Agusta)	(Italy) Giacomo Agostini (MV Agusta)	(United Kingdom) Rodney Gould (Yamaha)	(West Germany) Dieter Braun (Suzuki)	(Spain) Ángel Nieto (Derbi)	(West Germany) Klaus Enders (West Germany) Ralf Engelhardt (West Germany) Wolfgang Kalauch (BMW)
1971	(Italy) Giacomo Agostini (MV Agusta)	(Italy) Giacomo Agostini (MV Agusta)	(United Kingdom) Phil Read (Yamaha)	(Spain) Ángel Nieto (Derbi)	(Netherlands) Jan de Vries (Kreidler)	(West Germany) Horst Owesle (West Germany) Julius Kremer (United Kingdom) Peter Rutterford (Münch-URS)
1972	(Italy) Giacomo Agostini (MV Agusta)	(Italy) Giacomo Agostini (MV Agusta)	(Finland) Jarno Saarinen (Yamaha)	(Spain) Ángel Nieto (Derbi)	(Spain) Ángel Nieto (Derbi)	(West Germany) Klaus Enders (West Germany) Ralf Engelhardt (BMW)
1973	(United Kingdom) Phil Read (MV Agusta)	(Italy) Giacomo Agostini (MV Agusta)	(West Germany) Dieter Braun (Yamaha)	(Sweden) Kent Andersson (Yamaha)	(Netherlands) Jan de Vries (Kreidler)	(West Germany) Klaus Enders (West Germany) Ralf Engelhardt (BMW)
1974	(United Kingdom) Phil Read (MV Agusta)	(Italy) Giacomo Agostini (Yamaha)	(Italy) Walter Villa (Harley-Davidson)	(Sweden) Kent Andersson (Yamaha)	(Netherlands) Henk van Kessel (Kreidler-Van Veen) (Note: Henk van Kessel won the 1974 championship riding a Kreidler-Van Veen motorcycle. FIM still counts this as a win under the Kreidler brand.)	(West Germany) Klaus Enders (West Germany) Ralf Engelhardt (Busch-BMW)
1975	(Italy) Giacomo Agostini (Yamaha)	(Venezuela) Johnny Cecotto (Yamaha)	(Italy) Walter Villa (Harley-Davidson)	(Italy) Paolo Pileri (Morbidelli)	(Spain) Ángel Nieto (Kreidler)	(West Germany) Rolf Steinhausen (West Germany) Josef Huber (Busch-König)
1976	(United Kingdom) Barry Sheene (Suzuki)	(Italy) Walter Villa (Harley-Davidson)	(Italy) Walter Villa (Harley-Davidson)	(Italy) Pier Paolo Bianchi (Morbidelli)	(Spain) Ángel Nieto (Bultaco)	(West Germany) Rolf Steinhausen (West Germany) Josef Huber (Busch-König)

Year	750cc	500cc	350cc	250cc	125cc	50cc	Sidecar
1977	(United States) Steve Baker (Yamaha)	(United Kingdom) Barry Sheene (Suzuki)	(Japan) Takazumi Katayama (Yamaha)	(Italy) Mario Lega (Morbidelli)	(Italy) Pier Paolo Bianchi (Morbidelli)	(Spain) Ángel Nieto (Bultaco)	(United Kingdom) George O'Dell (United Kingdom) Kenny Arthur (United Kingdom) Cliff Holland (Windle-Yamaha) (Seymaz-Yamaha)
1978	(Venezuela) Johnny Cecotto (Yamaha)	(United States) Kenny Roberts (Yamaha)	(South Africa) Kork Ballington (Kawasaki)	(South Africa) Kork Ballington (Kawasaki)	(Italy) Eugenio Lazzarini (MBA)	(Spain) Ricardo Tormo (Bultaco)	(Switzerland) Rolf Biland (United Kingdom) Kenneth Williams (TTM-Yamaha) (BEO-Yamaha)

Year	750cc	500cc	350cc	250cc	125cc	50cc	Sidecar B2A	Sidecar B2B
1979	(France) Patrick Pons (Yamaha)	(United States) Kenny Roberts (Yamaha)	(South Africa) Kork Ballington (Kawasaki)	(South Africa) Kork Ballington (Kawasaki)	(Spain) Ángel Nieto (Minarelli)	(Italy) Eugenio Lazzarini (Kreidler)	(Switzerland) Rolf Biland (Switzerland) Kurt Waltisperg (Schmid-Yamaha)	(Switzerland) Bruno Holzer (Switzerland) Charlie Maierhans (LCR-Yamaha)

Year	500cc	350cc	250cc	125cc	50cc	Sidecar
1980	(United States) Kenny Roberts (Yamaha)	(South Africa) Jon Ekerold (Bimota-Yamaha)	(West Germany) Anton Mang (Kawasaki Krauser) (Note: Anton Mang won the 1980 championship riding a Kawasaki Krauser motorcycle. FIM still counts this as a win under the Kawasaki brand.)	(Italy) Pier Paolo Bianchi (MBA)	(Italy) Eugenio Lazzarini (Kreidler-Van Veen) (Note: Eugenio Lazzarini won the 1980 championship riding a Kreidler-Van Veen motorcycle. FIM still counts this as a win under the Kreidler brand.)	(United Kingdom) Jock Taylor (Sweden) Benga Johansson (Windle-Yamaha)
1981	(Italy) Marco Lucchinelli (Suzuki)	(West Germany) Anton Mang (Kawasaki)	(West Germany) Anton Mang (Kawasaki)	(Spain) Ángel Nieto (Minarelli)	(Spain) Ricardo Tormo (Motul-Bultaco) (Note: Ricardo Tormo won the 1981 championship riding a Motul-Bultaco motorcycle. FIM still counts this as a win under the Bultaco brand.)	(Switzerland) Rolf Biland (Switzerland) Kurt Waltisperg (LCR-Yamaha)
1982	(Italy) Franco Uncini (Suzuki)	(West Germany) Anton Mang (Kawasaki)	(France) Jean-Louis Tournadre (Yamaha)	(Spain) Ángel Nieto (Garelli)	(Switzerland) Stefan Dörflinger (Kreidler)	(West Germany) Werner Schwärzel (West Germany) Andreas Huber (Seymaz-Yamaha)

Year	500cc	250cc	125cc	50cc	Sidecar
1983	(United States) Freddie Spencer (Honda)	(Venezuela) Carlos Lavado (Yamaha)	(Spain) Ángel Nieto (Garelli)	(Switzerland) Stefan Dörflinger (Krauser)	(Switzerland) Rolf Biland (Switzerland) Kurt Waltisperg (LCR-Yamaha)

Year	500cc	250cc	125cc	80cc	Sidecar
1984	(United States) Eddie Lawson (Yamaha)	(France) Christian Sarron (Yamaha)	(Spain) Ángel Nieto (Garelli)	(Switzerland) Stefan Dörflinger (Zündapp)	(Netherlands) Egbert Streuer (Netherlands) Bernie Schnieders (LCR-Yamaha)
1985	(United States) Freddie Spencer (Honda)	(United States) Freddie Spencer (Honda)	(Italy) Fausto Gresini (Garelli)	(Switzerland) Stefan Dörflinger (Krauser)	(Netherlands) Egbert Streuer (Netherlands) Bernie Schnieders (LCR-Yamaha)
1986	(United States) Eddie Lawson (Yamaha)	(Venezuela) Carlos Lavado (Yamaha)	(Italy) Luca Cadalora (Garelli)	(Spain) Jorge Martínez (Derbi)	(Netherlands) Egbert Streuer (Netherlands) Bernie Schnieders (LCR-Yamaha)
1987	(Australia) Wayne Gardner (Honda)	(Germany) Anton Mang (Honda)	(Italy) Fausto Gresini (Garelli)	(Spain) Jorge Martínez (Derbi)	(United Kingdom) Steve Webster (United Kingdom) Tony Hewitt (LCR-Krauser)
1988	(United States) Eddie Lawson (Yamaha)	(Spain) Sito Pons (Honda)	(Spain) Jorge Martínez (Derbi)	(Spain) Jorge Martínez (Derbi)	(United Kingdom) Steve Webster (United Kingdom) Tony Hewitt (United Kingdom) Gavin Simmons (LCR-Krauser)
1989	(United States) Eddie Lawson (Honda)	(Spain) Sito Pons (Honda)	(Spain) Àlex Crivillé (JJ Cobas)	(Spain) Manuel Herreros (Derbi)	(United Kingdom) Steve Webster (United Kingdom) Tony Hewitt (LCR-Krauser)

Year	500cc	250cc	125cc	Sidecar
1990	(United States) Wayne Rainey (Yamaha)	(United States) John Kocinski (Yamaha)	(Italy) Loris Capirossi (Honda)	(France) Alain Michel (United Kingdom) Simon Birchall (LCR-Krauser)
1991	(United States) Wayne Rainey (Yamaha)	(Italy) Luca Cadalora (Honda)	(Italy) Loris Capirossi (Honda)	(United Kingdom) Steve Webster (United Kingdom) Gavin Simmons (LCR-Krauser)
1992	(United States) Wayne Rainey (Yamaha)	(Italy) Luca Cadalora (Honda)	(Italy) Alessandro Gramigni (Aprilia)	(Switzerland) Rolf Biland (Switzerland) Kurt Waltisperg (LCR-Krauser)
1993	(United States) Kevin Schwantz (Suzuki)	(Japan) Tetsuya Harada (Yamaha)	(Germany) Dirk Raudies (Honda)	(Switzerland) Rolf Biland (Switzerland) Kurt Waltisperg (LCR-Krauser)
1994	(Australia) Mick Doohan (Honda)	(Italy) Max Biaggi (Aprilia)	(Japan) Kazuto Sakata (Aprilia)	(Switzerland) Rolf Biland (Switzerland) Kurt Waltisperg (LCR-Swissauto)
1995	(Australia) Mick Doohan (Honda)	(Italy) Max Biaggi (Aprilia)	(Japan) Haruchika Aoki (Honda)	(United Kingdom) Darren Dixon (United Kingdom) Andy Hetherington (Windle-ADM)
1996	(Australia) Mick Doohan (Honda)	(Italy) Max Biaggi (Aprilia)	(Japan) Haruchika Aoki (Honda)	(United Kingdom) Darren Dixon (United Kingdom) Andy Hetherington (Windle-ADM)

Year	500cc	250cc	125cc
1997	(Australia) Mick Doohan (Honda)	(Italy) Max Biaggi (Honda)	(Italy) Valentino Rossi (Aprilia)
1998	(Australia) Mick Doohan (Honda)	(Italy) Loris Capirossi (Aprilia)	(Japan) Kazuto Sakata (Aprilia)
1999	(Spain) Àlex Crivillé (Honda)	(Italy) Valentino Rossi (Aprilia)	(Spain) Emilio Alzamora (Honda)
2000	(United States) Kenny Roberts Jr. (Suzuki)	(France) Olivier Jacque (Yamaha)	(Italy) Roberto Locatelli (Aprilia)
2001	(Italy) Valentino Rossi (Honda)	(Japan) Daijiro Kato (Honda)	(San Marino) Manuel Poggiali (Gilera)

Year	MotoGP	250cc	125cc
2002	(Italy) Valentino Rossi (Honda)	(Italy) Marco Melandri (Aprilia)	(France) Arnaud Vincent (Aprilia)
2003	(Italy) Valentino Rossi (Honda)	(San Marino) Manuel Poggiali (Aprilia)	(Spain) Dani Pedrosa (Honda)
2004	(Italy) Valentino Rossi (Yamaha)	(Spain) Dani Pedrosa (Honda)	(Italy) Andrea Dovizioso (Honda)
2005	(Italy) Valentino Rossi (Yamaha)	(Spain) Dani Pedrosa (Honda)	(Switzerland) Thomas Lüthi (Honda)
2006	(United States) Nicky Hayden (Honda)	(Spain) Jorge Lorenzo (Aprilia)	(Spain) Álvaro Bautista (Aprilia)
2007	(Australia) Casey Stoner (Ducati)	(Spain) Jorge Lorenzo (Aprilia)	(Hungary) Gábor Talmácsi (Aprilia)
2008	(Italy) Valentino Rossi (Yamaha)	(Italy) Marco Simoncelli (Gilera)	(France) Mike Di Meglio (Derbi)
2009	(Italy) Valentino Rossi (Yamaha)	(Japan) Hiroshi Aoyama (Honda)	(Spain) Julián Simón (Aprilia)

Year	MotoGP	Moto2	125cc
2010	(Spain) Jorge Lorenzo (Yamaha)	(Spain) Toni Elías (Moriwaki)	(Spain) Marc Márquez (Derbi)
2011	(Australia) Casey Stoner (Honda)	(Germany) Stefan Bradl (Kalex)	(Spain) Nicolás Terol (Aprilia)

Year	MotoGP	Moto2	Moto3
2012	(Spain) Jorge Lorenzo (Yamaha)	(Spain) Marc Márquez (Suter)	(Germany) Sandro Cortese (KTM)
2013	(Spain) Marc Márquez (Honda)	(Spain) Pol Espargaró (Kalex)	(Spain) Maverick Viñales (KTM)
2014	(Spain) Marc Márquez (Honda)	(Spain) Tito Rabat (Kalex)	(Spain) Álex Márquez (Honda)
2015	(Spain) Jorge Lorenzo (Yamaha)	(France) Johann Zarco (Kalex)	(United Kingdom) Danny Kent (Honda)
2016	(Spain) Marc Márquez (Honda)	(France) Johann Zarco (Kalex)	(South Africa) Brad Binder (KTM)
2017	(Spain) Marc Márquez (Honda)	(Italy) Franco Morbidelli (Kalex)	(Spain) Joan Mir (Honda)
2018	(Spain) Marc Márquez (Honda)	(Italy) Francesco Bagnaia (Kalex)	(Spain) Jorge Martín (Honda)
2019	(Spain) Marc Márquez (Honda)	(Spain) Álex Márquez (Kalex)	(Italy) Lorenzo Dalla Porta (Honda)
2020	(Spain) Joan Mir (Suzuki)	(Italy) Enea Bastianini (Kalex)	(Spain) Albert Arenas (KTM)
2021	(France) Fabio Quartararo (Yamaha)	(Australia) Remy Gardner (Kalex)	(Spain) Pedro Acosta (KTM)
2022	(Italy) Francesco Bagnaia (Ducati)	(Spain) Augusto Fernández (Kalex)	(Spain) Izan Guevara (GasGas)

Year	MotoGP	Moto2	Moto3	MotoE
2023	(Italy) Francesco Bagnaia (Ducati)	(Spain) Pedro Acosta (Kalex)	(Spain) Jaume Masià (Honda)	(Italy) Mattia Casadei (Ducati)
2024	(Spain) Jorge Martín (Ducati)	(Japan) Ai Ogura (Boscoscuro)	(Colombia) David Alonso (CFMoto)	(Spain) Héctor Garzó (Ducati)
2025	(Spain) Marc Márquez (Ducati)	(Brazil) Diogo Moreira (Kalex)	(Spain) José Antonio Rueda (KTM)	(Italy) Alessandro Zaccone (Ducati)

Year	MotoGP	Moto2	Moto3
2026	(Spain) Marc Márquez (Ducati)		(Spain) Máximo Quiles (KTM)

== See also ==
- List of Grand Prix motorcycle racing World Constructors' Champions
- List of Grand Prix motorcycle racing World Teams' Champions
- Sidecar World Championship
