= Mick Doohan =

Australian motorcycle racer (born 1965)

Mick Doohan AM
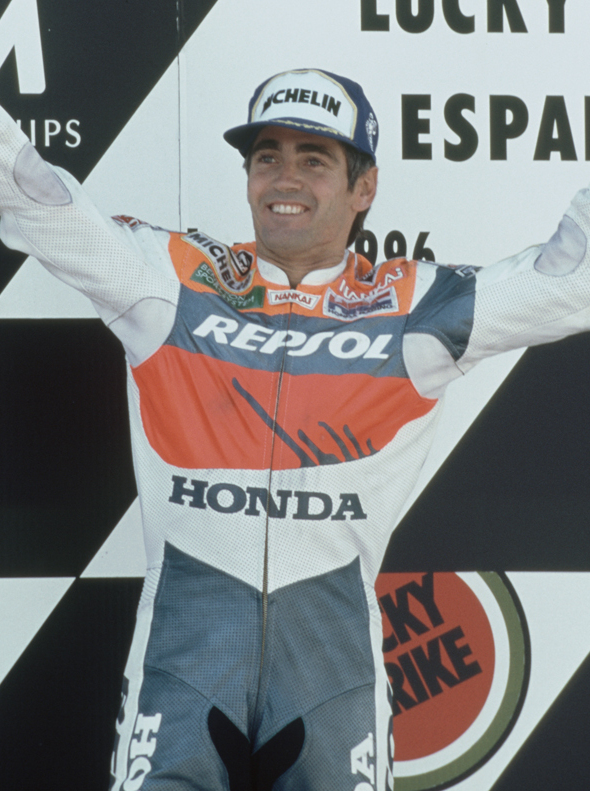
- Doohan in 1996
- Born: 4 June 1965 (age 61); Gold Coast, Queensland, Australia
- Children: 2, including Jack
Motorcycle racing career statistics
Grand Prix motorcycle racing
Active years	1989–1999
First race	1989 500cc Japanese Grand Prix
Last race	1999 500cc Japanese Grand Prix
First win	1990 500cc Hungarian Grand Prix
Last win	1998 500cc Argentine Grand Prix
Team	Honda
Championships	5; 500cc: 1994, 1995, 1996, 1997, 1998
Starts / Wins / Podiums / Poles / F. laps / Points; 137 / 54 / 95 / 58 / 46 / 2283

Michael Sydney Doohan (/ˈduːən/ DOO-ən; born 4 June 1965) is an Australian former Grand Prix motorcycle road racing World Champion, who won five consecutive 500 cc World Championships.

== Biography ==
Originally from the Gold Coast, Queensland, Doohan attended St Joseph's College, Gregory Terrace and Aspley State High School, Brisbane. He raced in Australian Superbikes in the late 1980s, and also won both races as Superbike World Championship visited Oran Park in 1988 as well as the second leg of the Japanese round held earlier in the year. In a break-out season he also won the final Australian motorcycle Grand Prix to be held in the TT format at Mount Panorama before the race became a round of the World Championship the following year and moved to Phillip Island. He is one of the few 500 cc or MotoGP World Champions to have won a Superbike World Championship race.

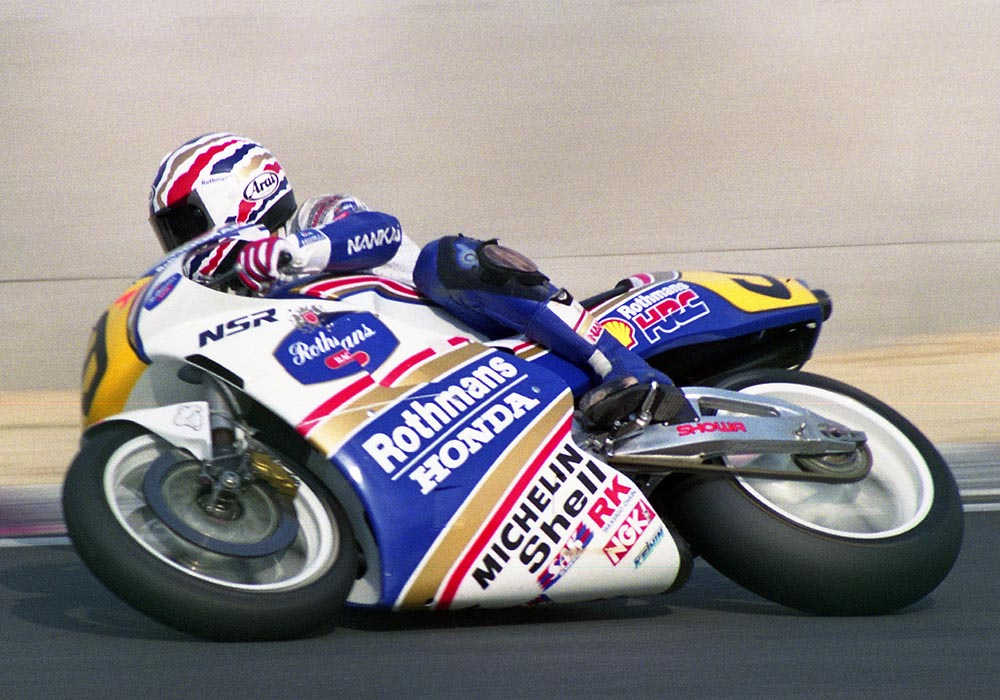
Doohan aboard the Rothmans Honda NSR500, 1990

Doohan made his Grand Prix debut for Honda on an NSR 500 cc two-stroke motorcycle in 1989. Late in the 1990 season, Doohan claimed his first victory at the Hungarian Grand Prix on his way to third in the championship.

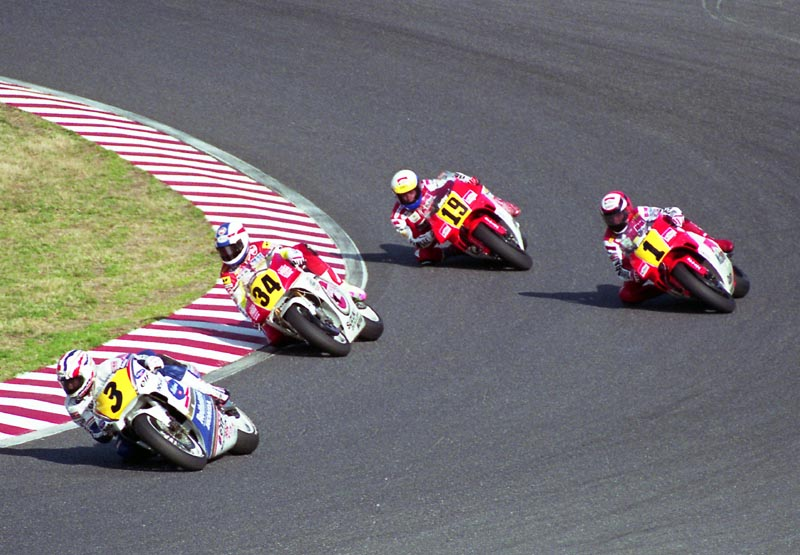
Doohan leads Kevin Schwantz, Wayne Rainey and John Kocinski at the 1991 Japanese Grand Prix

In 1991, Doohan was paired with his fellow Australian Wayne Gardner on a Honda RVF750 superbike and won the Suzuka 8 Hours endurance race. He competed successfully throughout the early 1990s and appeared to be on his way to winning his first world championship when he was seriously injured in a practice crash before the 1992 Dutch TT. He suffered permanent and serious damage to his right leg due to medical complications and, at one stage, faced amputation of the leg. At the time, Doohan was 65 points in the lead of the championship, but could not compete for eight weeks after the crash. After an arduous recovery, he returned to racing for the final two races but could not prevent Yamaha rider Wayne Rainey from winning his third consecutive title (by four points from Doohan). In 1993, he struggled with the healing of his leg and the ability to race the Honda at elite level, stating later that in that year it was all he could do to just keep his ride at Honda. It was also during this time he switched to a left thumb-operated rear brake, as his right foot was no longer able to perform this function.

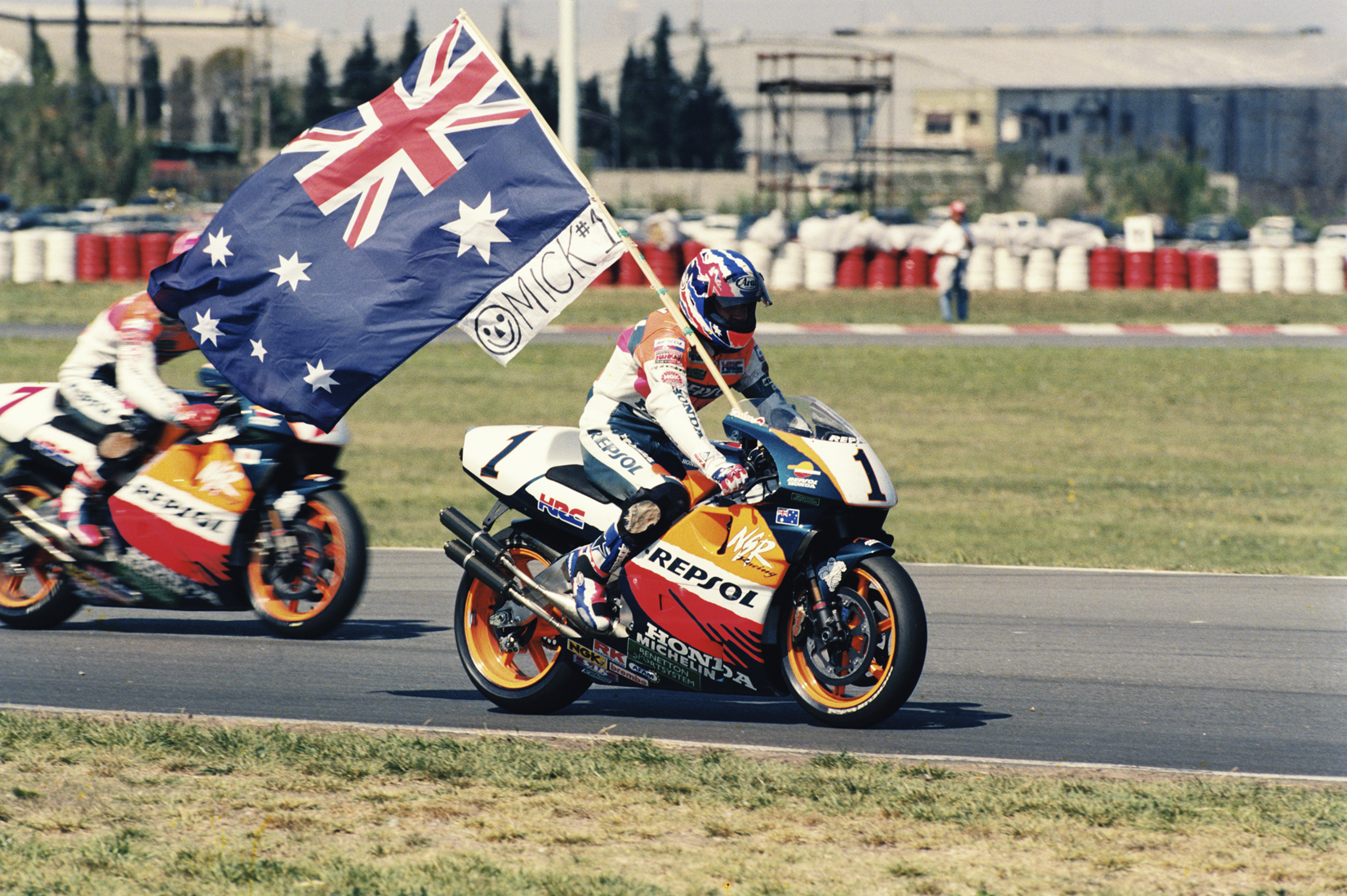
Doohan celebrates after winning the 1995 Argentine Grand Prix

In 1994 however, Doohan won his first 500 cc World Championship. Thereafter, until 1998, he dominated the class, winning five consecutive 500 cc World Championships. In 1997, his most successful year, Doohan won 12 out of 15 races, finished second in another two, and crashed out of the final race of the season at his home GP while leading by more than six seconds. In the 1996 Queen's Birthday Honours, Doohan was inducted as a Member of the Order of Australia (AM) for his contribution to the sport of motor racing.

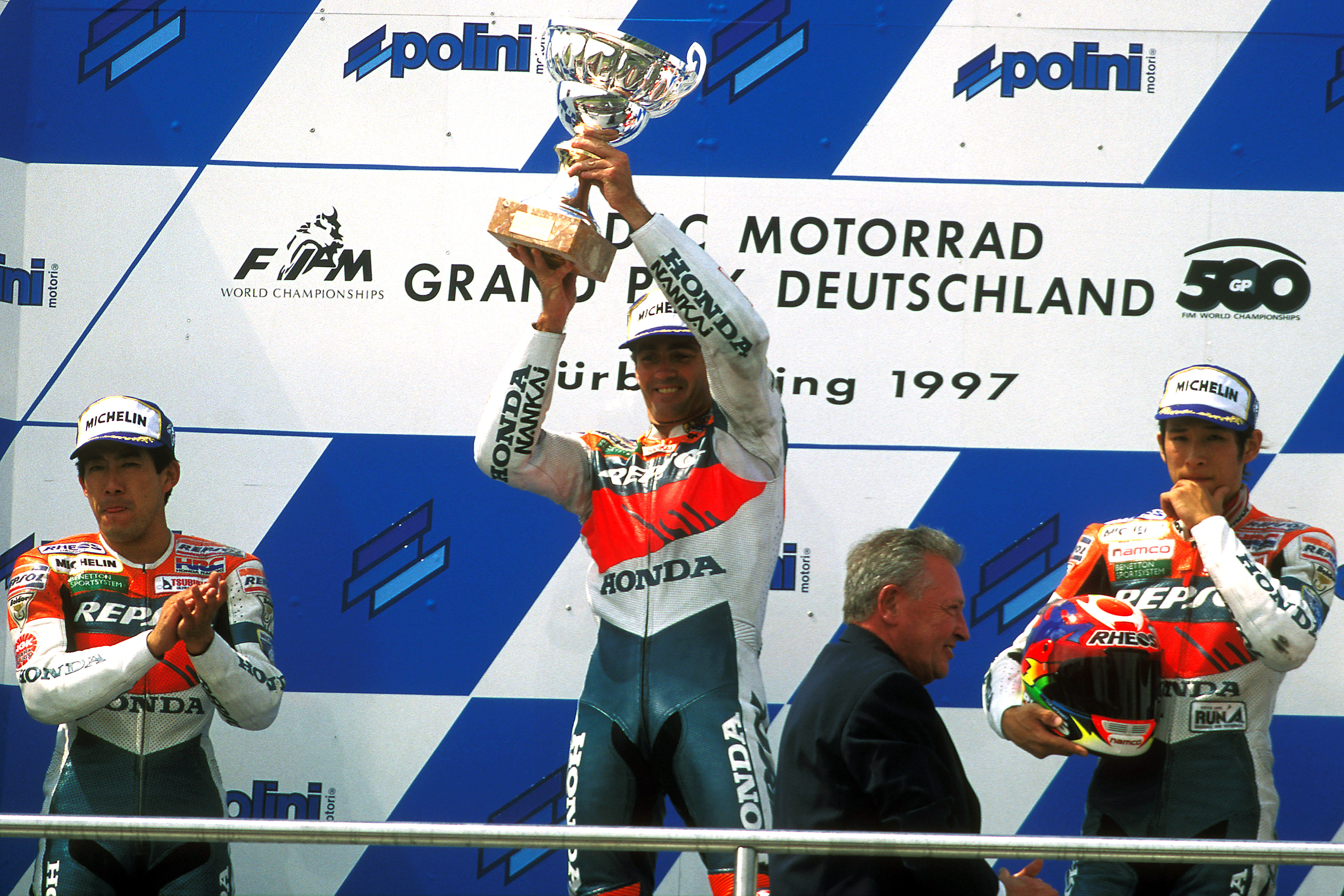
Doohan on the podium with Takuma Aoki and Tadayuki Okada after winning the 1997 German Grand Prix

Despite up to eight rivals on non-factory HRC Honda motorcycles, Doohan's margin of superiority over them was such that in many races Doohan would build a comfortable lead and then ride well within his limits to cruise to victory. Although pure riding skill clearly played a large part in his success, the ability of his chief race engineer, Jeremy Burgess, to perfect the suspension and geometry of a racing motorcycle may have given him an advantage over his rivals. Between 1994 and 1998, the bike was said not to have had many changes, with Honda engineers reportedly becoming frustrated at Doohan's reluctance to try innovations such as electronic shifting (it was only when Rossi came to Honda in 2000 that Honda engineers had their head with Rossi willing to try more innovations).

One notable trait of Doohan's post-crash riding style was the use of a thumb-operated rear brake developed during 1993 owing to the reduced range of motion in his ankle. This was operated by a "nudge" bar similar to a personal water craft throttle, but mounted on the left handlebar. In 1999, Doohan had another accident, this time in a very wet qualifying session for the Spanish Grand Prix. He again broke his leg in several places and subsequently announced his retirement. Jeremy Burgess, Doohan's chief engineer for his entire career, later became Valentino Rossi's chief engineer. After Doohan retired, he went to work as a roving adviser to Honda's Grand Prix race effort. At the conclusion of the 2004 season, Doohan and Honda parted company.

In June 2011, Doohan made an appearance at the Isle of Man TT. Doohan completed a parade lap, and was most enamored by the thrill and spectacle of the Snaefell Mountain Course. He then went on to pay tribute to his former Honda racing teammate, Joey Dunlop.

=== Cars ===
After his success in Grand Prix motorcycle racing, Doohan got a chance to test a Formula One race car, the Williams FW19, at Circuit de Catalunya (in Spain) in April 1998. He found the car difficult to drive and crashed against a guard rail. In 2001, Doohan drove a Mercedes Benz CLK55 AMG works rally car with his co-driver Mark Stacey in the 2001 Targa Tasmania rally. He was in thirteenth place on day three when he crashed the car; he and Stacey were uninjured after the incident.

== Personal life ==
On 8 August 2006, Doohan appeared in Darwin Magistrates Court to face charges over a weekend fracas at a strip club. He was fined $2,500 after pleading guilty to assaulting a bouncer and failing to leave a licensed premise. No conviction was recorded.

Doohan married Selina Sines, who had been his partner for the previous eleven years, on Tuesday 21 March 2006, on Hamilton Island; the couple have two children, including racing driver Jack Doohan.

Doohan helped design an Intamin Motorbike Launch Roller Coaster, named Mick Doohan's Motocoaster. The ride is located at Dreamworld on the Gold Coast, Queensland. Doohan's name was removed from the ride's branding in May 2022, and it is now known simply as Motocoaster.

== Honours ==
Doohan was made a Member of the Order of Australia (AM) in 1996 and received an Australian Sports Medal in 2000. He was awarded the "Key to the City" by the City of Gold Coast in 1997. He was inducted into the Sport Australia Hall of Fame in 2009 and upgraded to Legend in 2026. The first turn at Phillip Island Grand Prix Circuit is named after him.

In 2009 as part of the Q150 celebrations, Doohan was announced as one of the Q150 Icons of Queensland for his role as a "sports legend".

== Career statistics ==
=== Superbike World Championship ===
==== Races by year ====
(key) (Races in bold indicate pole position, races in italics indicate fastest lap)

Year	Bike	1		2		3		4		5		6		7		8		9		Pos	Pts
Year	Bike	R1	R2	R1	R2	R1	R2	R1	R2	R1	R2	R1	R2	R1	R2	R1	R2	R1	R2	Pos	Pts
1988	Yamaha	GBR	GBR	HUN	HUN	GER	GER	AUT	AUT	JPN; 31	JPN; 1	FRA	FRA	POR	POR	**AUS**; 1	**AUS**; 1	NZL	NZL	12th	30

=== Grand Prix motorcycle racing ===
==== By season ====
Season	Class	Motorcycle	Team	Number	Race	Win	Podium	Pole	FLap	Pts	Plcd	WCh
1989	500cc	Honda NSR500	Rothmans Honda	27	12	0	1	0	0	81	9th	–
1990	500cc	Honda NSR500	Rothmans Honda	9	15	1	5	3	2	179	**3rd**	–
1991	500cc	Honda NSR500	Rothmans Honda	3	15	3	14	2	1	224	**2nd**	–
1992	500cc	Honda NSR500	Rothmans Honda	2	9	5	7	6	5	136	**2nd**	–
1993	500cc	Honda NSR500	Rothmans Honda	2	13	1	6	4	4	156	4th	–
1994	500cc	Honda NSR500	Honda Team HRC	4	14	9	14	6	7	317	**1st**	1
1995	500cc	Honda NSR500	Repsol YPF Honda Team	1	13	7	10	9	7	248	**1st**	1
1996	500cc	Honda NSR500	Team Repsol Honda	1	15	8	12	8	4	309	**1st**	1
1997	500cc	Honda NSR500	Repsol YPF Honda Team	1	15	12	14	12	11	340	**1st**	1
1998	500cc	Honda NSR500	Repsol Honda	1	14	8	11	8	3	260	**1st**	1
1999	500cc	Honda NSR500	Repsol Honda Team	1	2	0	1	0	2	33	17th	–
Total					**137**	**54**	**95**	**58**	**46**	**2283**		**5**

==== By class ====
Class	Seasons	1st GP	1st Pod	1st Win	Race	Win	Podiums	Pole	FLap	Pts	WChmp
500cc	1989–1999	1989 Japan	1989 Germany	1990 Hungary	137	54	95	58	46	2283	5
Total	1989–1999				**137**	**54**	**95**	**58**	**46**	**2283**	**5**

==== Races by year ====
(key) (Races in bold indicate pole position, races in italics indicate fastest lap)

Year	Class	Bike	1	2	3	4	5	6	7	8	9	10	11	12	13	14	15	16	Pos	Pts
1989	500cc	Honda	JPN; Ret	AUS; 8	USA; 8	SPA; Ret	NAT; Ret	GER; 3	AUT; 8	YUG; 6	NED; 9	BEL; 8	FRA; 8	GBR	SWE	CZE	BRA; 4		9th	81
1990	500cc	Honda	JPN; Ret	USA; 2	**SPA**; 4	NAT; 3	GER; Ret	AUT; 3	YUG; 4	NED; 4	BEL; 6	FRA; 4	GBR; 4	SWE; 4	CZE; 9	**HUN**; 1	**AUS**; 2		3rd	179
1991	500cc	Honda	JPN; 2	AUS; 2	USA; 2	SPA; 1	ITA; 1	**GER**; 3	**AUT**; 1	EUR; 2	NED; Ret	FRA; 2	GBR; 3	RSM; 3	CZE; 2	VDM; 2	MAL; 3		2nd	224
1992	500cc	Honda	JPN; 1	**AUS**; 1	**MAL**; 1	**SPA**; 1	**ITA**; 2	**EUR**; 2	**GER**; 1	NED; DNS	HUN	FRA	GBR	BRA; 12	RSA; 6				2nd	136
1993	500cc	Honda	AUS; Ret	MAL; 4	JPN; 7	SPA; 4	AUT; 2	GER; Ret	**NED**; 2	**EUR**; 2	**RSM**; 1	GBR; Ret	CZE; 3	ITA; 2	**USA**; Ret	FIM			4th	156
1994	500cc	Honda	AUS; 3	MAL; 1	JPN; 2	SPA; 1	**AUT**; 1	**GER**; 1	**NED**; 1	ITA; 1	**FRA**; 1	**GBR**; 2	CZE; 1	**USA**; 3	ARG; 1	EUR; 2			1st	317
1995	500cc	Honda	**AUS**; 1	**MAL**; 1	**JPN**; 2	**SPA**; Ret	**GER**; Ret	**ITA**; 1	NED; 1	**FRA**; 1	**GBR**; 1	CZE; 2	**BRA**; 2	ARG; 1	EUR; 4				1st	248
1996	500cc	Honda	MAL; 5	**INA**; 1	JPN; 6	**SPA**; 1	**ITA**; 1	FRA; 1	NED; 1	GER; 2	**GBR**; 1	**AUT**; 2	CZE; 2	**IMO**; 1	**CAT**; 2	**BRA**; 1	AUS; 8		1st	309
1997	500cc	Honda	MAL; 1	JPN; 1	SPA; 2	**ITA**; 1	**AUT**; 1	**FRA**; 1	**NED**; 1	**IMO**; 1	**GER**; 1	**BRA**; 1	**GBR**; 1	**CZE**; 1	**CAT**; 1	**INA**; 2	**AUS**; Ret		1st	340
1998	500cc	Honda	JPN; Ret	**MAL**; 1	SPA; 2	**ITA**; 1	**FRA**; 2	**MAD**; Ret	**NED**; 1	GBR; 2	GER; 1	**CZE**; Ret	IMO; 1	CAT; 1	**AUS**; 1	**ARG**; 1			1st	260
1999	500cc	Honda	MAL; 4	JPN; 2	SPA; DNS	FRA	ITA	CAT	NED	GBR	GER	CZE	IMO	VAL	AUS	RSA	BRA	ARG	17th	33

=== Suzuka 8 Hours results ===
Year	Team	Co-Rider	Bike	Pos
1991	(Japan) Oki Honda Racing Team	(Australia) Wayne Gardner (Australia) Mick Doohan	Honda RVF750 RC45	**1st**

== See also ==
- Daijiro Kato
- Nicky Hayden
- Motorcycle sport

== Bibliography ==
- Oxley, Mat (1 January 1999). Mick Doohan: Thunder from Down Under. Haynes Publishing. ISBN 978-1859606353.
- Flack, Darryl (30 August 2023). The Immortals of Australian Motorcycle Racing: The World Champs (Part of the 7-volume comprehensive sports collection). Immortals of Australian Sport (7-book series). Gelding Street Press. ISBN 978-0-6452070-5-7.
