= List of 50/80cc World Riders' Champions =

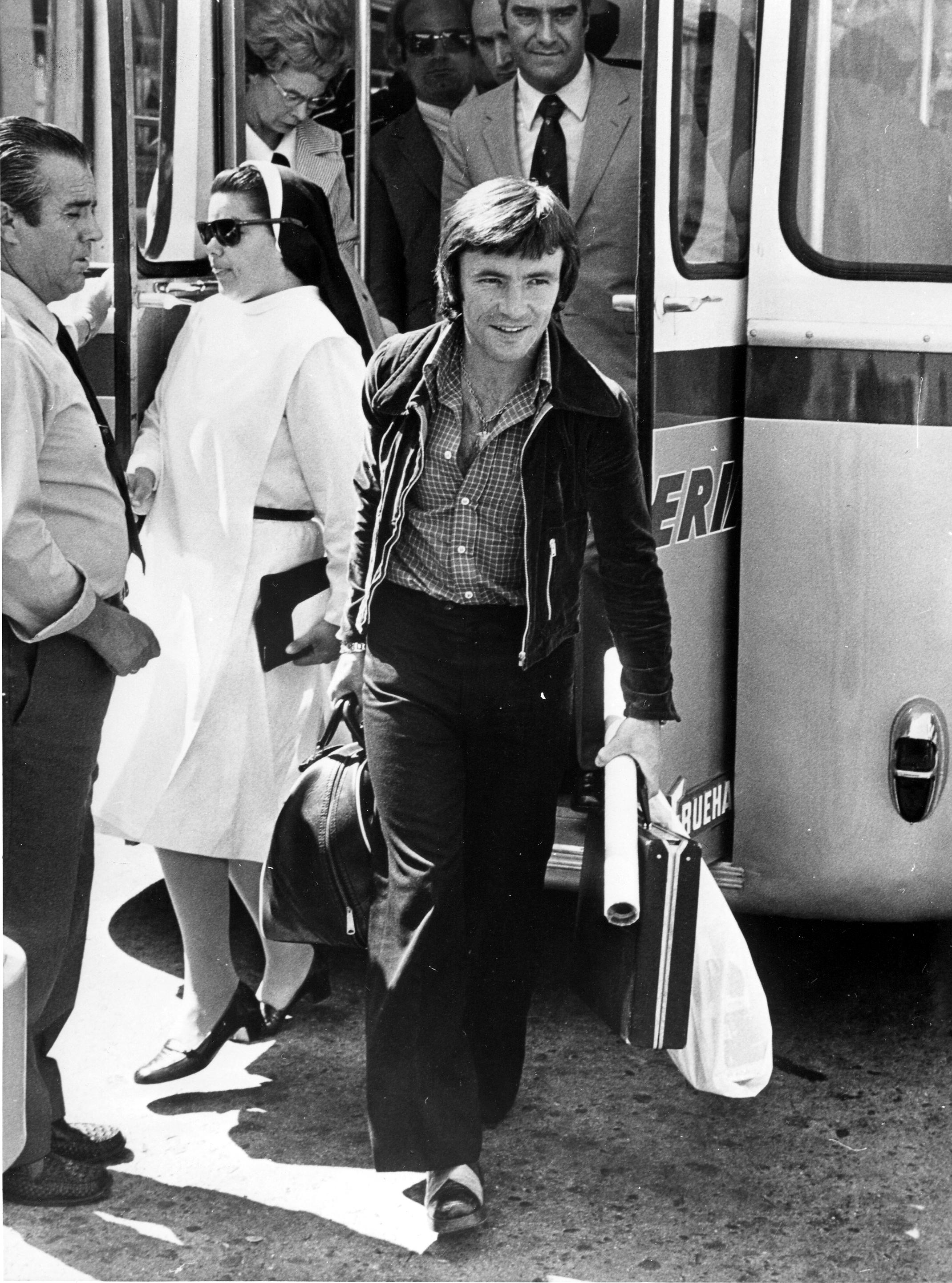
Ángel Nieto, who won six 50cc championships

Grand Prix motorcycle racing is the premier championship of motorcycle road racing, which has been divided into three classes: MotoGP, Moto2, and Moto3. Former classes that have been discontinued include 350cc, 250cc, 125cc, 50cc/80cc, MotoE, and Sidecar. The Grand Prix Road Racing World Championship was established in 1949 by the sport's governing body, the Fédération Internationale de Motocyclisme (FIM), and is the oldest motorsport world championship in existence. The 50/80cc referred to the size of the engines of the motorcycles that participated in the class. The 50cc was introduced in 1962, 13 years after the start of the first world championships. The category was replaced by 80cc in 1984 and the class was subsequently discontinued after 1989.

Points earned in these events count toward the riders' and constructors' world championships. These two are separate championships, but are based on the same point system. The points systems used in the championship varied over the years. The first championship in 1962 awarded points from first to sixth place; a point was also awarded for the rider who completed the fastest lap. The last championship in 1989 awarded points from first to fifteenth place. Results from all Grands Prix counted towards the championships; however, in some seasons only a certain number of results were counted.

Ángel Nieto has won the most championships, with six. Stefan Dörflinger has won the second-most championships, with four. Hans-Georg Anscheidt and Jorge Martínez have won the third-most championships, with three each. Spanish riders have won the most championships; four riders have won a total of 12 championships. German riders have won the second-most championships; two riders have won a total of four championships. Riders from Switzerland have won the third-most championships; one rider has won a total of four championships. Ernst Degner won the inaugural championship in 1962. Manuel Herreros was the last champion before the class was discontinued after 1989.

== Champions ==
Key
‡	Champion also won the 125cc Championship in that season
—	Indicates that information is unavailable

- The "Season" column refers to the season the competition was held, and wikilinks to the article about that season.
- The "Margin" column refers to the margin of points by which the winner defeated the runner-up.

=== By season ===
50/80cc World Riders' Champions by season
Season	Nationality	Rider	Constructor	Grands Prix	Poles	Wins	Podiums	Fastest laps	Points	Margin
1962 (Note: The points awarded in the 1962 championship were 8 points for a win, with 6, 4, 3, 2, and 1 point from second place to sixth place.)	West Germany	Ernst Degner	Suzuki	10	—	4	5	4	41	5
1963	New Zealand	Hugh Anderson^{‡}	Suzuki	9	—	2	7	2	34	2
1964	New Zealand	Hugh Anderson	Suzuki	9	—	4	6	4	38	8
1965	United Kingdom	Ralph Bryans	Honda	8	—	3	5	1	36	4
1966	West Germany	Hans-Georg Anscheidt	Suzuki	6	—	2	4	3	28	2
1967	West Germany	Hans-Georg Anscheidt	Suzuki	7	—	3	6	1	30	2
1968	West Germany	Hans-Georg Anscheidt	Suzuki	5	—	3	4	2	30	13
1969	Spain	Ángel Nieto	Derbi	10	—	2	6	4	76	1
1970	Spain	Ángel Nieto	Derbi	10	—	5	7	5	87	12
1971	Netherlands	Jan de Vries	Kreidler	9	—	5	7	4	75	6
1972	Spain	Ángel Nieto^{‡} (Note: Ángel Nieto and Jan de Vries finished the 1972 championship tied on 69 points. Nieto and de Vries had both won three Grands Prix and finished second three times. As a result, the championship was decided by adding up their times from the five races that the two had finished together. Nieto was declared the winner by 21.5 seconds.)	Derbi	8	—	3	6	5	69	0
1973	Netherlands	Jan de Vries	Kreidler	7	—	5	5	5	60	9
1974	Netherlands	Henk van Kessel	Kreidler-Van Veen (Note: Henk van Kessel won the 1974 championship riding a Kreidler-Van Veen motorcycle. FIM still counts this as a win under the Kreidler brand.)	10	4	6	8	—	90	25
1975	Spain	Ángel Nieto	Kreidler	8	1	6	8	—	75	14
1976	Spain	Ángel Nieto	Bultaco	9	8	5	7	—	85	9
1977	Spain	Ángel Nieto	Bultaco	7	4	3	7	—	87	15
1978	Spain	Ricardo Tormo	Bultaco	7	4	5	7	—	99	35
1979	Italy	Eugenio Lazzarini	Kreidler	7	4	5	5	—	75	13
1980	Italy	Eugenio Lazzarini	Kreidler-Van Veen (Note: Eugenio Lazzarini won the 1980 championship riding a Kreidler-Van Veen motorcycle. FIM still counts this as a win under the Kreidler brand.)	6	1	2	6	—	74	2
1981	Spain	Ricardo Tormo	Motul-Bultaco (Note: Ricardo Tormo won the 1981 championship riding a Motul-Bultaco motorcycle. FIM still counts this as a win under the Bultaco brand.)	8	3	6	6	—	90	25
1982	Switzerland	Stefan Dörflinger	Kreidler	6	5	3	6	—	81	12
1983	Switzerland	Stefan Dörflinger	Krauser	7	4	3	6	—	81	12
1984	Switzerland	Stefan Dörflinger	Zündapp	8	5	4	5	—	82	7
1985	Switzerland	Stefan Dörflinger	Krauser	7	5	2	7	—	86	19
1986	Spain	Jorge Martínez	Derbi	9	5	4	7	—	94	9
1987	Spain	Jorge Martínez	Derbi	10	7	7	9	—	129	43
1988	Spain	Jorge Martínez^{‡}	Derbi	7	7	6	7	—	137	47
1989 (Note: The points awarded to riders in the 1989 championship were 20 points for a win, with 17, 15, 13, 11, 10, 9, 8, 7, 6, 5, 4, 3, 2, and 1 point from second place to fifteenth place.)	Spain	Manuel Herreros	Derbi	6	0	0	4	—	92	12

=== Multiple champions ===
50/80cc multiple champions
Rider	Total	Seasons
(Spain) Ángel Nieto	6	1969, 1970, 1972, 1975, 1976, 1977
(Switzerland) Stefan Dörflinger	4	1982, 1983, 1984, 1985
(Germany) Hans-Georg Anscheidt	3	1966, 1967, 1968
(Spain) Jorge Martínez	3	1986, 1987, 1988
(New Zealand) Hugh Anderson	2	1963, 1964
(Netherlands) Jan de Vries	2	1971, 1973
(Italy) Eugenio Lazzarini	2	1979, 1980
(Spain) Ricardo Tormo	2	1978, 1981

=== By constructor ===
50/80cc World Riders' Champions by constructor
Constructor	Total
(Germany) Kreidler	7
(Spain) Derbi	7
(Japan) Suzuki	6
(Spain) Bultaco	4
(Germany) Krauser	2
(Japan) Honda	1
(Germany) Zündapp	1

=== By nationality ===
50/80cc World Riders' Champions by nationality
Nationality	Riders	Total
Spain	4	12
Germany	2	4
Switzerland	1	4
Netherlands	2	3
New Zealand	1	2
Italy	1	2
United Kingdom	1	1
