= List of Grand Prix motorcycle racers =

This is a list of Grand Prix motorcycle road racers from the 1949 to the 2019 season, in alphabetical order, from the classes MotoGP, Moto2, Moto3, 500 cc, 350 cc, 250 cc, 125 cc, 80 cc, and 50 cc.

== Women in Grand Prix ==
- Inge Stoll (Germany) competed as a female passenger during the world sidecar championship between 1954 and 1958. She was the first woman to race at the Isle of Man TT in 1954.
- Beryl Swain (Great Britain) was the first woman to compete in the solo class at the Isle of Man TT and finished 22nd in the 1962 50 cc Ultra-Lightweight TT riding an Itom motorcycle. This led the male-dominated world of motorcycling to revoke her international licence due to the perception of the sport being too dangerous for women, and the resulting ban on female entrants persisted until Hilary Musson competed in 1978 Isle of Man TT.
- Katja Poensgen (Germany) is the only female motorcycle racer to score points in the 250 cc Grand Prix class. In 2001, she raced 250 cc at the Italian Moto Grand Prix in Mugello and finished fourteenth.
- Taru Rinne (Finland) scored a total of twenty-five points in the 125 cc class throughout the 1988 and 1989 seasons, and was second in practice for the 1998 German Grand Prix.
- Tomoko Igata (Japan) scored a total of thirty points in the 125 cc class throughout the 1994 and 1995 seasons.
- Elena Rosell (Spain) competed in Moto2 class in the 2011 and 2012 seasons.
- Ana Carrasco (Spain) competed Moto3 class between 2013 and 2015, and also in 2022 and 2023 seasons.
- María Herrera (Spain) competed Moto3 class between 2013 and 2017, and also in MotoE class since 2019.
