= List of 500cc/MotoGP World Riders' Champions =

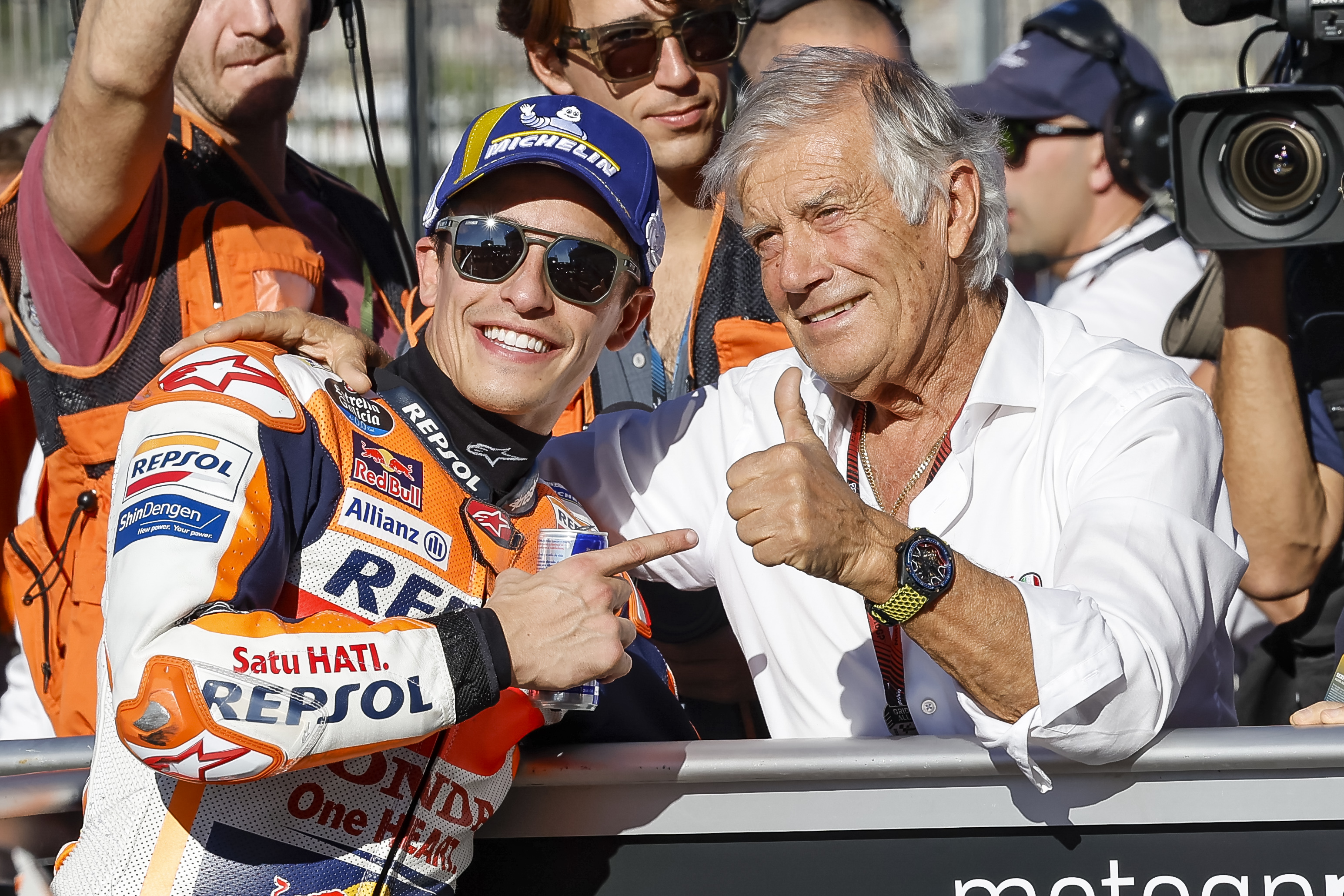
Marc Márquez (left) and Giacomo Agostini are tied for the record of eight 500cc/MotoGP World Championships.

Grand Prix motorcycle racing is the premier championship of motorcycle road racing, which has been divided into three classes: MotoGP, Moto2, and Moto3. Former classes that have been discontinued include 350cc, 250cc, 125cc, 50cc/80cc, MotoE, and Sidecar. The premier class is MotoGP, which was formerly known as the 500cc class. The Grand Prix Road-Racing World Championship was established in 1949 by the sport's governing body, the Fédération Internationale de Motocyclisme (FIM), and is the oldest motorsport world championship in existence. The motorcycles used in MotoGP are purpose-built for the sport, and are unavailable for purchase by the general public because they cannot be legally ridden on public roads. From the mid-1970s to 2002, the top class of GP racing allowed 500cc with a maximum of four cylinders, regardless of whether the engine was a two-stroke or four-stroke. Rule changes were introduced in 2002 to facilitate the phasing out of two-stroke engines. That same year, MotoGP replaced the 500cc class.

Points earned in these events count toward the riders' and constructors' world championships. These two are separate championships, but are based on the same point system. The number of points awarded at the end of each race to the top 15 qualifying riders depends on their placement. Points received by each finisher, from first place to 15th place: 25, 20, 16, 13, 11, 10, 9, 8, 7, 6, 5, 4, 3, 2, 1. Historically, there have been several points systems. Results from all current Grands Prix count towards the championships; in the past, only a certain number of results were counted.

Giacomo Agostini and Marc Márquez have won the most championships, with eight each, while Agostini also holds the record for the most consecutive championships, with seven successive titles from 1966 to 1972. Marc Márquez is the youngest to win the championship; he was 20 years and 266 days old when he won in 2013. Italian riders have won the most championships; seven riders have won a total of 22 championships. British riders have won the second-most championships; six riders have won a total of 17 championships. Riders from the United States have won the third-most championships; seven riders have won a total of 15 championships. Leslie Graham won the inaugural championship in 1949. Valentino Rossi was the last rider to win the 500cc championship in 2001, and the first to win the MotoGP championship in 2002. Marc Márquez is the current champion; he won the 2026 MotoGP World Championship.

== Champions ==
Key
†	Champion also won 350cc Championship in that season
*	Champion also won 250cc Championship in that season
—	Indicates information is not available

- The "Season" column refers to the season the competition was held, and wikilinks to the article about that season.
- The "Margin" column refers to the margin of points by which the winner defeated the runner-up.

=== By season ===
500cc/MotoGP World Riders' Champions by season
Season	Country	Rider	Constructor	Grands Prix	Poles	Wins	Podiums	Fastest laps	Points	Clinched	# of rounds remaining	Margin
1949	United Kingdom	Leslie Graham	AJS	6	—	2	3	3	30	Round 5 of 6	1	1
1950	Italy	Umberto Masetti	Gilera	6 (Note: Masetti missed one race of the season.)	—	2	4	1	28	Round 6 of 6	0	1
1951	United Kingdom	Geoff Duke†	Norton	8 (Note: Duke missed one race of the season.)	—	4	4	2	35	Round 7 of 8	1	4
1952	Italy	Umberto Masetti	Gilera	8 (Note: Masetti missed one race of the season.)	—	2	4	2	28	Round 8 of 8	0	3
1953	United Kingdom	Geoff Duke	Gilera	8 (Note: Duke missed one race of the season.)	—	4	5	1	38	Round 7 of 8	1	14
1954	United Kingdom	Geoff Duke	Gilera	8 (Note: Duke missed one race of the season.)	—	5	6	4	40	Round 7 of 8	1	20
1955	United Kingdom	Geoff Duke	Gilera	8 (Note: Duke missed one race of the season.)	—	4	5	6	36	Round 6 of 8	2	6
1956	United Kingdom	John Surtees	MV Agusta	6 (Note: Surtees missed three races of the season.)	—	3	3	2	24	Round 5 of 6	1	8
1957	Italy	Libero Liberati	Gilera	6 (Note: Liberati missed one race of the season.)	—	4	5	1	32	Round 6 of 6	0	12
1958	United Kingdom	John Surtees^{†}	MV Agusta	7 (Note: Surtees missed one race of the season.)	—	6	6	5	32	Round 4 of 7	3	12
1959	United Kingdom	John Surtees^{†}	MV Agusta	7	—	7	7	6	32	Round 4 of 7	3	10
1960	United Kingdom	John Surtees^{†}	MV Agusta	7	—	5	6	6	32	Round 5 of 7	2	6
1961	Rhodesia and Nyasaland	Gary Hocking^{†}	MV Agusta	10 (Note: Hocking missed one race of the season.)	—	7	7	9	48	Round 7 of 10	3	8
1962	United Kingdom	Mike Hailwood	MV Agusta	8 (Note: Hailwood missed two races of the season.)	—	5	5	4	40	Round 6 of 8	2	11
1963	United Kingdom	Mike Hailwood	MV Agusta	8	—	7	7	7	40	Round 6 of 8	2	19
1964	United Kingdom	Mike Hailwood	MV Agusta	9 (Note: Hailwood missed two races of the season.)	—	7	7	6	40	Round 5 of 9	4	15
1965	United Kingdom	Mike Hailwood	MV Agusta	10 (Note: Hailwood missed two races of the season.)	—	8	8	8	48	Round 6 of 10	4	10
1966	Italy	Giacomo Agostini	MV Agusta	9	—	3	8	2	36	Round 9 of 9	0	6
1967	Italy	Giacomo Agostini	MV Agusta	10	—	5	8	4	46	Round 10 of 10	0	0 (Note: Agostini won on countback by having three second-place finishes compared to Mike Hailwood's two.)
1968	Italy	Giacomo Agostini^{†}	MV Agusta	10	—	10	10	10	48	Round 6 of 10	4	14
1969	Italy	Giacomo Agostini^{†}	MV Agusta	12 (Note: Agostini missed two races of the season.)	—	10	10	10	105	Round 7 of 12	5	58
1970	Italy	Giacomo Agostini^{†}	MV Agusta	11 (Note: Agostini missed one race of the season.)	—	10	10	9	90	Round 6 of 11	5	28
1971	Italy	Giacomo Agostini^{†}	MV Agusta	11 (Note: Agostini missed two races of the season.)	—	8	8	9	90	Round 6 of 11	5	32
1972	Italy	Giacomo Agostini^{†}	MV Agusta	13 (Note: Agostini missed one race of the season.)	—	11	11	12	105	Round 8 of 13	5	18
1973	United Kingdom	Phil Read	MV Agusta	11 (Note: Read missed three races of the season.)	—	4	8	1	84	Round 9 of 11	2	21
1974	United Kingdom	Phil Read	MV Agusta	10 (Note: Read missed two races of the season.)	4	4	7	1	82	Round 9 of 10	1	13
1975	Italy	Giacomo Agostini	Yamaha	10 (Note: Agostini missed one race of the season.)	2	4	6	4	84	Round 10 of 10	0	8
1976	United Kingdom	Barry Sheene	Suzuki	10 (Note: Sheene missed four races of the season.)	4	5	6	3	72	Round 7 of 10	3	24
1977	United Kingdom	Barry Sheene	Suzuki	11 (Note: Sheene missed two races of the season.)	7	6	7	6	107	Round 9 of 11	2	27
1978	United States	Kenny Roberts	Yamaha	11	2	4	8	6	110	Round 11 of 11	0	10
1979	United States	Kenny Roberts	Yamaha	12 (Note: Roberts missed two races of the season.)	5	5	7	4	113	Round 12 of 12	0	24
1980	United States	Kenny Roberts	Yamaha	8	2	3	6	4	87	Round 8 of 8	0	15
1981	Italy	Marco Lucchinelli	Suzuki	11	7	5	6	5	105	Round 11 of 11	0	11
1982	Italy	Franco Uncini	Suzuki	12 (Note: Uncini missed one race of the season.)	1	5	7	1	103	Round 10 of 12	2	27
1983	United States	Freddie Spencer	Honda	12	6	6	10	3	144	Round 12 of 12	0	2
1984	United States	Eddie Lawson	Yamaha	12	2	4	9	3	142	Round 11 of 12	1	31
1985	United States	Freddie Spencer^{*}	Honda	12 (Note: Spencer missed one race of the season.)	10	7	10	6	141	Round 11 of 12	1	8
1986	United States	Eddie Lawson	Yamaha	11	7	7	10	6	139	Round 10 of 11	1	22
1987	Australia	Wayne Gardner	Honda	15	10	7	11	8	178	Round 14 of 15	1	20
1988	United States	Eddie Lawson	Yamaha	15	2	7	12	5	252	Round 14 of 15	1	23
1989	United States	Eddie Lawson	Honda	15	1	4	13	3	228	Round 15 of 15	0	17.5
1990	United States	Wayne Rainey	Yamaha	15	3	7	14	6	255	Round 13 of 15	2	67
1991	United States	Wayne Rainey	Yamaha	15 (Note: Rainey missed one race of the season.)	6	6	13	8	233	Round 14 of 15	1	9
1992	United States	Wayne Rainey	Yamaha	13 (Note: Rainey missed one race of the season.)	0	3	8	3	140	Round 13 of 13	0	4
1993	United States	Kevin Schwantz	Suzuki	14	6	4	11	2	248	Round 14 of 14	0	34
1994	Australia	Mick Doohan	Honda	14	6	9	14	7	317	Round 11 of 14	3	143
1995	Australia	Mick Doohan	Honda	13	9	7	10	7	248	Round 12 of 13	1	33
1996	Australia	Mick Doohan	Honda	15	8	8	12	4	309	Round 13 of 15	2	64
1997	Australia	Mick Doohan	Honda	15	12	12	14	11	340	Round 11 of 15	4	143
1998	Australia	Mick Doohan	Honda	14	8	8	11	3	260	Round 13 of 14	1	52
1999	Spain	Àlex Crivillé	Honda	16	2	6	10	2	267	Round 15 of 16	1	47
2000	United States	Kenny Roberts Jr.	Suzuki	16	4	4	9	3	258	Round 14 of 16	2	49
2001	Italy	Valentino Rossi	Honda	16	4	11	13	10	325	Round 14 of 16	2	106
2002	Italy	Valentino Rossi	Honda	16	7	11	15	9	355	Round 12 of 16	4	140
2003	Italy	Valentino Rossi	Honda	16	9	9	16	12	357	Round 14 of 16	2	80
2004	Italy	Valentino Rossi	Yamaha	16	5	9	11	3	304	Round 15 of 16	1	47
2005	Italy	Valentino Rossi	Yamaha	17	5	11	16	6	367	Round 13 of 17	4	147
2006	United States	Nicky Hayden	Honda	17	1	2	10	2	252	Round 17 of 17	0	5
2007	Australia	Casey Stoner	Ducati	18	4	10	14	6	367	Round 15 of 18	3	125
2008	Italy	Valentino Rossi	Yamaha	18	2	9	16	6	373	Round 15 of 18	3	93
2009	Italy	Valentino Rossi	Yamaha	17	7	6	13	6	306	Round 16 of 17	1	45
2010	Spain	Jorge Lorenzo	Yamaha	18	7	9	16	4	383	Round 15 of 18	3	138
2011	Australia	Casey Stoner	Honda	17	12	10	16	7	350	Round 16 of 17	1	90
2012	Spain	Jorge Lorenzo	Yamaha	18	7	6	16	5	350	Round 17 of 18	1	18
2013	Spain	Marc Márquez	Honda	18	9	6	16	11	334	Round 18 of 18	0	4
2014	Spain	Marc Márquez	Honda	18	13	13	14	12	362	Round 15 of 18	3	67
2015	Spain	Jorge Lorenzo	Yamaha	18	5	7	12	6	330	Round 18 of 18	0	5
2016	Spain	Marc Márquez	Honda	18	7	5	12	4	298	Round 15 of 18	3	49
2017	Spain	Marc Márquez	Honda	18	8	6	12	3	298	Round 18 of 18	0	37
2018	Spain	Marc Márquez	Honda	18	7	9	14	7	321	Round 15 of 18	3	76
2019	Spain	Marc Márquez	Honda	19	10	12	18	12	420	Round 15 of 19	4	151
2020	Spain	Joan Mir	Suzuki	14	0	1	7	0	171	Round 13 of 14	1	13
2021	France	Fabio Quartararo	Yamaha	18	5	5	10	5	278	Round 16 of 18	2	26
2022	Italy	Francesco Bagnaia	Ducati	20	5	7	10	3	265	Round 20 of 20	0	17
2023	Italy	Francesco Bagnaia	Ducati	20 (Note: Bagnaia missed one race of the season.)	7	7	15	3	467	Round 20 of 20	0	39
2024	Spain	Jorge Martín	Ducati	20	7	3	16	2	508	Round 20 of 20	0	10
2025	Spain	Marc Márquez	Ducati	22 (Note: Márquez missed four races of the season.)	8	11	15	9	545	Round 17 of 22	5	78
2026	Spain	Marc Márquez	Ducati	20* (Note: Márquez missed two races of the season.)	4*	7*	8*	4*	439*	Round 20 of 21	1	43*

* Season still in progress

=== By rider ===
- Bold indicates rider took part in the 2026 season.

500cc/MotoGP World Riders' Champions by rider
Rider	Titles	Seasons
(Italy) Giacomo Agostini	8	1966, 1967, 1968, 1969, 1970, 1971, 1972, 1975
(Spain) **Marc Márquez**	8	2013, 2014, 2016, 2017, 2018, 2019, 2025, 2026
(Italy) Valentino Rossi	7	2001, 2002, 2003, 2004, 2005, 2008, 2009
(Australia) Mick Doohan	5	1994, 1995, 1996, 1997, 1998
(United Kingdom) Geoff Duke	4	1951, 1953, 1954, 1955
(United Kingdom) John Surtees	4	1956, 1958, 1959, 1960
(United Kingdom) Mike Hailwood	4	1962, 1963, 1964, 1965
(United States) Eddie Lawson	4	1984, 1986, 1988, 1989
(United States) Kenny Roberts	3	1978, 1979, 1980
(United States) Wayne Rainey	3	1990, 1991, 1992
(Spain) Jorge Lorenzo	3	2010, 2012, 2015
(Italy) Umberto Masetti	2	1950, 1952
(United Kingdom) Phil Read	2	1973, 1974
(United Kingdom) Barry Sheene	2	1976, 1977
(United States) Freddie Spencer	2	1983, 1985
(Australia) Casey Stoner	2	2007, 2011
(Italy) **Francesco Bagnaia**	2	2022, 2023
(United Kingdom) Leslie Graham	1	1949
(Italy) Libero Liberati	1	1957
(Federation of Rhodesia and Nyasaland) Gary Hocking	1	1961
(Italy) Marco Lucchinelli	1	1981
(Italy) Franco Uncini	1	1982
(Australia) Wayne Gardner	1	1987
(United States) Kevin Schwantz	1	1993
(Spain) Àlex Crivillé	1	1999
(United States) Kenny Roberts Jr.	1	2000
(United States) Nicky Hayden	1	2006
(Spain) **Joan Mir**	1	2020
(France) **Fabio Quartararo**	1	2021
(Spain) **Jorge Martín**	1	2024
30 riders		78 titles

=== By constructor ===
- Bold indicates constructor took part in the 2026 season.

500cc/MotoGP World Riders' Champions by constructor
Constructor	Titles	Seasons
(Japan) **Honda**	21	1983, 1985, 1987, 1989, 1994, 1995, 1996, 1997, 1998, 1999, 2001, 2002, 2003, 2006, 2011, 2013, 2014, 2016, 2017, 2018, 2019
(Italy) MV Agusta	18	1956, 1958, 1959, 1960, 1961, 1962, 1963, 1964, 1965, 1966, 1967, 1968, 1969, 1970, 1971, 1972, 1973, 1974
(Japan) **Yamaha**	18	1975, 1978, 1979, 1980, 1984, 1986, 1988, 1990, 1991, 1992, 2004, 2005, 2008, 2009, 2010, 2012, 2015, 2021
(Japan) Suzuki	7	1976, 1977, 1981, 1982, 1993, 2000, 2020
(Italy) Gilera	6	1950, 1952, 1953, 1954, 1955, 1957
(Italy) **Ducati**	6	2007, 2022, 2023, 2024, 2025, 2026
(United Kingdom) AJS	1	1949
(United Kingdom) Norton	1	1951
8 constructors		78 titles

=== By nationality ===
500cc/MotoGP World Riders' Champions by nationality
Country	Riders	Titles
Italy	7	22
United Kingdom	6	17
United States	7	15
Spain	5	14
Australia	3	8
Rhodesia and Nyasaland	1	1
France	1	1

== See also ==
- List of 500cc/MotoGP race winners
