= List of 350cc World Riders' Champions =

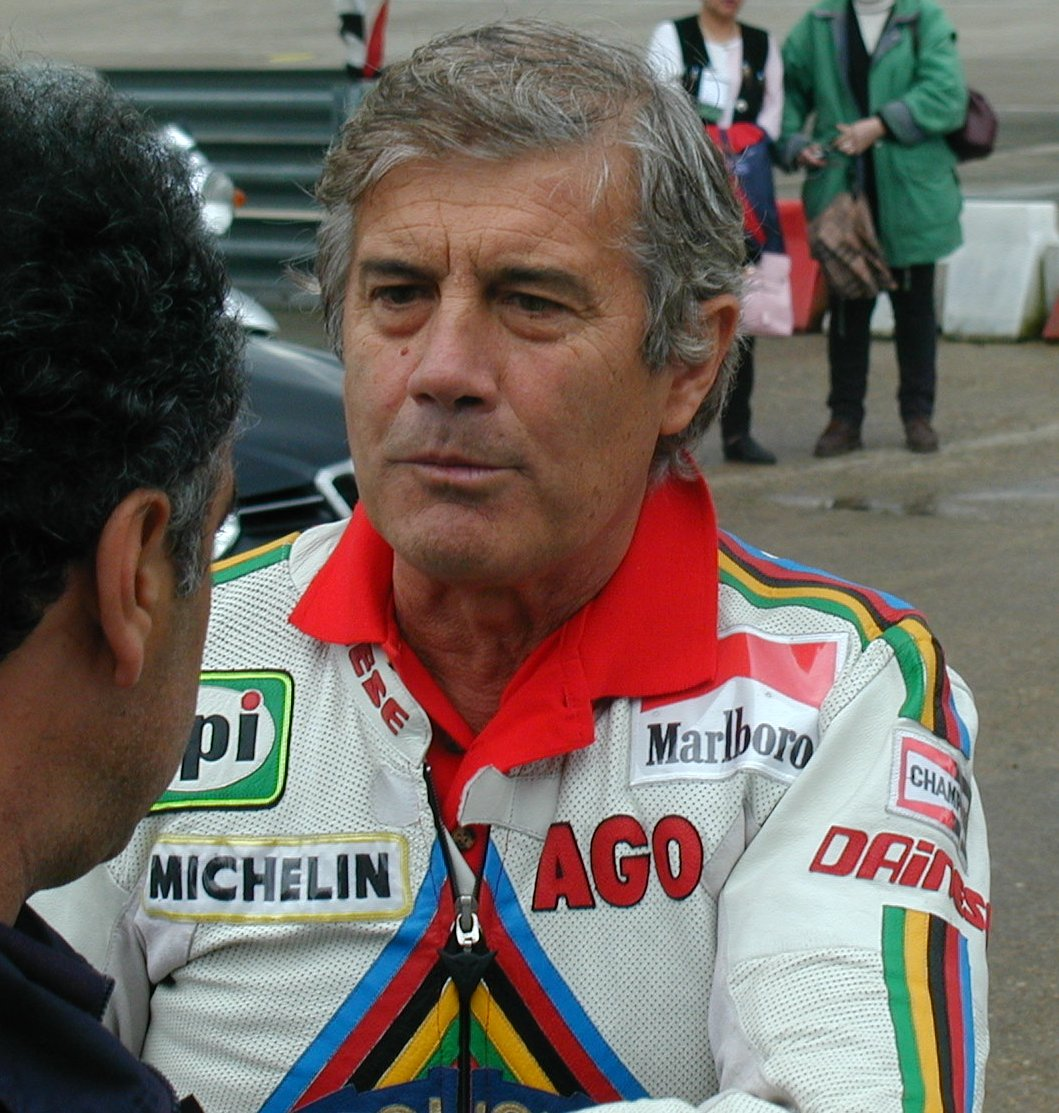
Giacomo Agostini, who won seven 350cc championships

Grand Prix motorcycle racing is the premier championship of motorcycle road racing, which has been divided into three classes: MotoGP, Moto2, and Moto3. Former classes that have been discontinued include 350cc, 250cc, 125cc, 50cc/80cc, MotoE, and Sidecar. The Grand Prix Road-Racing World Championship was established in 1949 by the sport's governing body, the Fédération Internationale de Motocyclisme (FIM), and is the oldest motorsport world championship in existence. The 350cc referred to the size of the engines of the motorcycles that participated in the class. The engines had four cylinders, similar to the types of engines used in MotoGP today. The 350cc class existed from 1949 until 1982.

Points earned in these events count toward the riders' and constructors' world championships. These two are separate championships, but are based on the same point system. The points systems used in the championship varied over the years. The first championship in 1949 awarded 10 points to the race winner with 8, 7, 6, and 5 points from second place to fifth place, a point was also awarded for the rider who completed the fastest lap. The last championship in 1982 awarded 15 points for a win, with 12, 10, 8, 6, 5, 4, 3, 2, and 1 point from second place to tenth place. Results from all Grands Prix counted towards the championships; however, in some seasons only a certain number of results were counted.

Giacomo Agostini has won the most championships, with seven. Jim Redman has won the second-most championships, with four, and John Surtees has won the third-most championships, with three. Johnny Cecotto is the youngest rider to win the championship; he was 19 years old when he won in 1975. British riders have won the most championships; seven riders have won a total of 13 championships. Italian riders have won the second-most championships; two riders have won a total of eight championships. Riders from Rhodesia have won the third-most championships; two riders have won a total of five championships. MV Agusta was the constructor whose riders won the most championships, with a total of 10 championships. Honda was second with six championships, and Moto Guzzi was third with five championships. Freddie Frith won the inaugural championship in 1949. Anton Mang was the last champion before the class was discontinued after 1982.

== Champions ==
Key
‡	Champion also won the 500cc championship in that season
†	Champion also won the 250cc championship in that season
—	Indicates information is not available

- The "Season" column refers to the season the competition was held, and wikilinks to the article about that season.
- The "Margin" column refers to the margin of points by which the winner defeated the runner-up.

=== By season ===
350cc World Riders' Champions by season
Season	Country	Rider	Constructor	Grands Prix	Poles	Wins	Podiums	Fastest laps	Points	Margin
1949	United Kingdom	Freddie Frith	Velocette	5	—	5	5	5	33	15
1950	United Kingdom	Bob Foster	Velocette	6	—	3	4	4	30	6
1951	United Kingdom	Geoff Duke^{‡}	Norton	8	—	5	5	4	40	21
1952	United Kingdom	Geoff Duke	Norton	7	—	4	4	4	32	8
1953	United Kingdom	Fergus Anderson	Moto Guzzi	8	—	3	5	2	34	8
1954	United Kingdom	Fergus Anderson	Moto Guzzi	9	—	4	5	5	38	16
1955	United Kingdom	Bill Lomas	Moto Guzzi	7	—	4	6	5	32	14
1956	United Kingdom	Bill Lomas	Moto Guzzi	6	—	3	3	4	24	7
1957	Australia	Keith Campbell	Moto Guzzi	6	—	3	4	1	30	8
1958	United Kingdom	John Surtees^{‡}	MV Agusta	7	—	6	6	5	32	8
1959	United Kingdom	John Surtees^{‡}	MV Agusta	6	—	6	6	5	48	32
1960	United Kingdom	John Surtees^{‡} (Note: John Surtees and Gary Hocking finished the 1960 championship tied on 22 points. Surtees was declared the winner by virtue of having more third-place finishes than Hocking, as they were tied on first and second places finishes.)	MV Agusta	5	—	2	4	3	22	0
1961	Rhodesia and Nyasaland	Gary Hocking^{‡}	MV Agusta	7	—	4	5	5	32	6
1962	Rhodesia and Nyasaland	Jim Redman^{†}	Honda	6	—	4	5	2	32	10
1963	Rhodesia and Nyasaland	Jim Redman^{†}	Honda	7	—	5	7	5	32	4
1964	Rhodesia	Jim Redman	Honda	8	—	8	8	7	40	16
1965	Rhodesia	Jim Redman	Honda	9	—	4	5	3	38	6
1966	United Kingdom	Mike Hailwood^{†}	Honda	10	—	6	6	6	48	6
1967	United Kingdom	Mike Hailwood^{†}	Honda	8	—	6	6	5	40	8
1968	Italy	Giacomo Agostini^{‡}	MV Agusta	7	—	7	7	7	32	14
1969	Italy	Giacomo Agostini^{‡}	MV Agusta	10	—	8	8	7	90	43
1970	Italy	Giacomo Agostini^{‡}	MV Agusta	10	—	9	9	9	90	32
1971	Italy	Giacomo Agostini^{‡}	MV Agusta	11	—	6	6	8	90	27
1972	Italy	Giacomo Agostini^{‡}	MV Agusta	12	—	6	7	7	102	13
1973	Italy	Giacomo Agostini	MV Agusta	11	—	4	6	3	84	7
1974	Italy	Giacomo Agostini	Yamaha	10	1	5	5	5	75	13
1975	Venezuela	Johnny Cecotto	Yamaha	10	3	4	5	6	78	19
1976	Italy	Walter Villa^{†}	Harley-Davidson	10	4	4	5	7	76	11
1977	Japan	Takazumi Katayama	Yamaha	11	0	5	7	7	95	39
1978	South Africa	Kork Ballington^{†}	Kawasaki	11	4	6	9	10	134	57
1979	South Africa	Kork Ballington^{†}	Kawasaki	11	5	5	5	9	99	9
1980	South Africa	Jon Ekerold	Bimota-Yamaha	6	0	4	5	6	63	3
1981	West Germany	Anton Mang^{†}	Kawasaki	8	6	5	7	8	103	51
1982	West Germany	Anton Mang	Kawasaki	9	1	1	6	7	81	17

=== Multiple champions ===
350cc multiple champions
Rider	Total	Seasons
(Italy) Giacomo Agostini	7	1968, 1969, 1970, 1971, 1972, 1973, 1974
(Rhodesia) Jim Redman	4	1962, 1963, 1964, 1965
(United Kingdom) John Surtees	3	1958, 1959, 1960
(United Kingdom) Geoff Duke	2	1951, 1952
(United Kingdom) Fergus Anderson	2	1953, 1954
(United Kingdom) Bill Lomas	2	1955, 1956
(United Kingdom) Mike Hailwood	2	1966, 1967
(South Africa) Kork Ballington	2	1978, 1979
(West Germany) Anton Mang	2	1981, 1982

=== By constructor ===
350cc World Riders' Champions by constructor
Constructor	Total
(Italy) MV Agusta	10
(Japan) Honda	6
(Italy) Moto Guzzi	5
(Japan) Kawasaki	4
(Japan) Yamaha	3
(United Kingdom) Velocette	2
(United Kingdom) Norton	2
(United States) Harley-Davidson	1
(Italy) Bimota-Yamaha	1

=== By nationality ===
350cc World Riders' Champions by nationality
Country	Riders	Total
United Kingdom	7	13
Italy	2	8
Rhodesia	2	5
South Africa	2	3
West Germany	1	2
Australia	1	1
Venezuela	1	1
Japan	1	1
