= List of Grand Prix motorcycle races =

The following is a complete list of Grands Prix which have been a part of the Grand Prix motorcycle racing championship season since its inception in 1949.

As of the 2026 Portuguese Grand Prix, 1,077 World Championship Grands Prix have been held over 78 seasons in 30 countries and under 55 race titles at 76 racing circuits.

Both the Dutch TT and the Italian Grand Prix have run every year since 1949 with the exception of 2020, sharing the record total of 77 events held. Spain has hosted a record 12 different Grands Prix for the record total of 157 events held.

== Active and past races ==
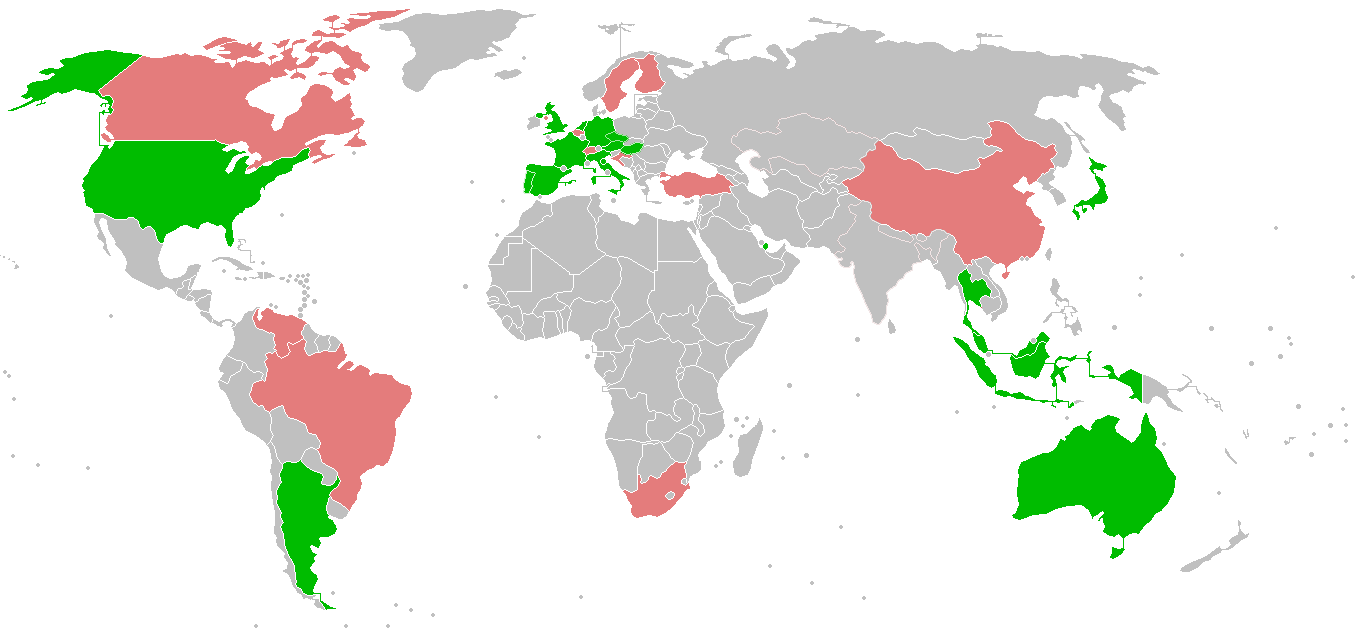

=== By race title ===
Races have been held under 55 race titles as of the 2026 Portuguese Grand Prix. Bold denotes the 21 Grands Prix scheduled to be held in the 2026 season.

Race	Years held	No. of races
(Portugal) Algarve Grand Prix	2021	1
(United States) Grand Prix of the Americas	2013–2019, 2021–2025	12
(Andalusia) Andalusian Grand Prix	2020	1
**Aragon Grand Prix**	2010–2022, 2024–2026	**16**
(Argentina) Argentine Grand Prix (Note: Between 2014 and 2023 the event was known as the Argentine Republic Grand Prix.)	1961–1963, 1981–1982, 1987, 1994–1995, 1998–1999, 2014–2019, 2022–2023, 2025	19
(Australia) Australian Grand Prix (Note: An Australian Grand Prix was supposed to be held in 2026, but was cancelled due to inclement weather and poor visibility. Even if the qualifying sessions were held, it is not included in this table since the races of the three categories were all cancelled.)	1989–2019, 2022–2025	35
(Austria) **Austrian Grand Prix**	1971–1979, 1981–1991, 1993–1994, 1996–1997, 2016–2026	**35**
Baden-Württemberg Grand Prix	1986	1
(Belgium) Belgian Grand Prix	1949–1986, 1988–1990	41
(Brazil) **Brazilian Grand Prix** (Note: There was also a race held in Brazil from 1995 to 2004, but it was known as the Rio de Janeiro Grand Prix.)	1987–1989, 1992, 2026	**5**
(United Kingdom) **British Grand Prix** (Note: A British Grand Prix was supposed to be held in 2018, but was cancelled due to bad weather and track conditions. Even if the qualifying sessions were held, it is not included in this table since the races of the three categories were all cancelled.)	1977–2017, 2019, 2021–2026	**48**
(Canada) Canadian Grand Prix	1967	1
(Catalonia) **Catalan Grand Prix**	1996–2026	**31**
(China) Chinese Grand Prix	2005–2008	4
(Czech Republic) **Czech Grand Prix** (Note: Before 1993 the event was known as the Czechoslovak Grand Prix, while from 1993 to 2020, the race was known as the Czech Republic Grand Prix.)	1965–1982, 1987–1991, 1993–2020, 2025–2026	**53**
(Qatar) Doha Grand Prix	2021	1
(Netherlands) **Dutch TT**	1949–2019, 2021–2026	**77**
(East Germany) East German Grand Prix (Note: Properly called Grand Prix of the GDR)	1961–1972	12
(Emilia-Romagna) Emilia Romagna Grand Prix (Note: In 2020 the event was known as the Emilia Romagna and Rimini Riviera Grand Prix.)	2020–2021, 2024	3
(Europe) European Grand Prix	1991–1995, 2020	6
(Andalusia) Expo 92 Grand Prix	1988	1
FIM Grand Prix (Note: The Grand Prix was held in Spain.)	1993	1
(Finland) Finnish Grand Prix	1962–1982	21
(France) **French Grand Prix**	1951, 1953–1955, 1959–1967, 1969–1970, 1972–1992, 1994–2026	**69**
(Germany) **German Grand Prix** (Note: From 1961 to 1972, when an East German Grand Prix was also held, it was also referred to as West German Grand Prix)	1952–2019, 2021–2026	**74**
(Hungary) **Hungarian Grand Prix**	1990, 1992, 2025–2026	**4**
(Bologna) Imola Grand Prix	1996–1999	4
(India) Indian Grand Prix	2023	1
Indianapolis Grand Prix	2008–2015	8
(Indonesia) **Indonesian Grand Prix**	1996–1997, 2022–2026	**7**
Isle of Man Tourist Trophy	1949–1976	28
(Italy) **Italian Grand Prix** (Note: From 1949 to 1990 the event was known as Nations Grand Prix.)	1949–2019, 2021–2026	**77**
(Japan) **Japanese Grand Prix**	1963–1967, 1987–2019, 2022–2026	**43**
(Community of Madrid) Madrid Grand Prix	1998	1
**(Malaysia) Malaysian Grand Prix**	1991–2019, 2022–2026	**34**
(Tochigi Prefecture) Pacific Grand Prix (Note: The Grand Prix was held in Japan.)	2000–2003	4
(Portugal) **Portuguese Grand Prix** (Note: The 1987 race was held in Spain.)	1987, 2000–2012, 2020–2026	**21**
**Qatar Grand Prix**	2004–2026	**23**
(Rio de Janeiro (state)) Rio de Janeiro Grand Prix	1995–1997, 1999–2004	9
**San Marino and Rimini Riviera Grand Prix** (Note: The Grand Prix was held in various tracks in Italy; before 2007 it was known as simply the San Marino Grand Prix.)	1981–1987, 1991, 1993, 2007–2026	**29**
Solidarity Grand Prix (Note: The Grand Prix was held in Spain.)	2024	1
(South Africa) South African Grand Prix	1983–1985, 1992, 1999–2004	10
(Spain) **Spanish Grand Prix**	1951–1955, 1961–2026	**71**
(Styria) Styrian Grand Prix	2020–2021	2
(Sweden) Swedish Grand Prix	1958–1959, 1961, 1971–1979, 1981–1990	22
(Switzerland) Swiss Grand Prix	1949–1954 (Note: After 1955 Le Mans disaster, the Swiss government banned motor races in its territory.)	6
(Province of Teruel) Teruel Grand Prix	2020	1
**Thailand Grand Prix**	2018–2019, 2022–2026	**7**
(Turkey) Turkish Grand Prix	2005–2007	3
Ulster Grand Prix (Note: The Grand Prix was held in Northern Ireland.)	1949–1971	23
**United States Grand Prix**	1964–1965, 1988–1991, 1993–1994, 2005–2013, 2026	**18**
(Valencian Community) **Valencian Grand Prix** (Note: From 1999 to 2025, the race was known as the Valencian Community motorcycle Grand Prix.)	1999–2023, 2025	**26**
(Venezuela) Venezuelan Grand Prix	1977–1979	3
(Pays de la Loire) Vitesse du Mans Grand Prix	1991	1
(Socialist Federal Republic of Yugoslavia) Yugoslavian Grand Prix (Note: The event was also known as the Adriatic Grand Prix.)	1969–1970, 1972–1990	21

=== By host nation ===
There have been 30 countries that have hosted a motorcycle World Championship race as of the 2026 Portuguese Grand Prix. Bold denotes the 21 Grands Prix scheduled to be held in the 2026 season.

Country	Races held	Total
Argentina	Argentine Grand Prix (1961–1963, 1981–1982, 1987, 1994–1995, 1998–1999, 2014–2019, 2022–2023, 2025)	19
Australia	Australian Grand Prix (1989–2019, 2022–2025)	35
**Austria**	**Austrian Grand Prix**, 35 (1971–1979, 1981–1991, 1993–1994, 1996–1997, 2016–2026); Styrian Grand Prix, 2 (2020–2021)	**37**
Belgium	Belgian Grand Prix (1949–1986, 1988–1990)	41
**Brazil**	**Brazilian Grand Prix**, 5 (1987–1989, 1992, 2026); Rio de Janeiro Grand Prix, 9 (1995–1997, 1999–2004)	**14**
Canada	Canadian Grand Prix (1967)	1
China	Chinese Grand Prix (2005–2008)	4
**Czech Republic**	Czechoslovak Grand Prix, 23 (1965–1982, 1987–1991); **Czech Grand Prix**, 30 (1993–2020, 2025–2026)	**53**
Finland	Finnish Grand Prix (1962–1982)	21
**France**	**French Grand Prix**, 69 (1951, 1953–1955, 1959–1967, 1969–1970, 1972–1992, 1994–2026); Vitesse du Mans Grand Prix, 1 (1991)	**70**
**Germany**	**German Grand Prix**, 74 (1952–2019, 2021–2026); East German Grand Prix, 12 (1961–1972); Baden-Württemberg Grand Prix, 1 (1986)	**87**
**Hungary**	**Hungarian Grand Prix** (1990, 1992, 2025–2026)	**4**
India	Indian Grand Prix (2023)	1
**Indonesia**	**Indonesian Grand Prix** (1996–1997, 2022–2026)	**7**
**Italy**	**Italian Grand Prix**, 77 (1949–2019, 2021–2026); **San Marino and Rimini Riviera Grand Prix**, 29 (1981–1987, 1991, 1993, 2007–2026); Imola Grand Prix, 4 (1996–1999); Emilia Romagna Grand Prix, 3 (2020–2021, 2024)	**113**
**Japan**	**Japanese Grand Prix**, 43 (1963–1967, 1987–2019, 2022–2026); Pacific Grand Prix, 4 (2000–2003)	**47**
**Malaysia**	**Malaysian Grand Prix** (1991–2019, 2022–2026)	**34**
**Netherlands**	**Dutch TT** (1949–2019, 2021–2026)	**77**
**Portugal**	**Portuguese Grand Prix**, 20 (2000–2012, 2020–2026); Algarve Grand Prix, 1 (2021)	**21**
**Qatar**	**Qatar Grand Prix**, 23 (2004–2026); Doha Grand Prix, 1 (2021)	**24**
South Africa	South African Grand Prix (1983–1985, 1992, 1999–2004)	10
**Spain**	**Spanish Grand Prix**, 71 (1951–1955, 1961–2026); Portuguese Grand Prix, 1 (1987); Expo 92 Grand Prix, 1 (1988); European Grand Prix, 6 (1991–1995, 2020); FIM Grand Prix, 1 (1993); **Catalan Grand Prix**, 31 (1996–2026); Madrid Grand Prix, 1 (1998); **Valencian Grand Prix**, 26 (1999–2023, 2025); **Aragon Grand Prix**, 16 (2010–2022, 2024–2026); Andalusian Grand Prix, 1 (2020); Teruel Grand Prix, 1 (2020); Solidarity Grand Prix, 1 (2024)	**157**
Sweden	Swedish Grand Prix (1958–1959, 1961, 1971–1979, 1981–1990)	22
Switzerland	Swiss Grand Prix (1949–1954)	6
**Thailand**	**Thailand Grand Prix** (2018–2019, 2022–2026)	**7**
Turkey	Turkish Grand Prix (2005–2007)	3
**United Kingdom**	Isle of Man TT, 28 (1949–1976); Ulster Grand Prix, 23 (1949–1971); **British Grand Prix**, 48 (1977–2017, 2019, 2021–2026)	**99**
**United States**	**United States Grand Prix**, 18 (1964–1965, 1988–1991, 1993–1994, 2005–2013, 2026); Indianapolis Grand Prix, 8 (2008–2015); Grand Prix of the Americas, 12 (2013–2019, 2021–2025)	**38**
Venezuela	Venezuelan Grand Prix (1977–1979)	3
Yugoslavia (now Croatia)	Yugoslavian Grand Prix (1969–1970, 1972–1990)	21

== Milestone races ==
=== Multiples of 100 ===
==== Active classes ====
Grand Prix motorcycle races by multiples of 100
Race number	Season	Grand Prix	Circuit	Winners									
Race number	Season	Grand Prix	Circuit	MotoGP/500cc		Moto2/250cc		Moto3/125cc					
Race number	Season	Grand Prix	Circuit	Rider	Constructor	Rider	Constructor	Rider	Constructor				
Race number	Season	Grand Prix	Circuit	100	1962	(Spain) Spanish	Montjuïc			(Federation of Rhodesia and Nyasaland) Jim Redman	(Japan) Honda	(Japan) Kunimitsu Takahashi	(Japan) Honda
200	1970	(Belgium) Belgian	Spa-Francorchamps	(Italy) Giacomo Agostini	(Italy) MV Agusta	(United Kingdom) Rodney Gould	(Japan) Yamaha	(Spain) Ángel Nieto	(Spain) Derbi				
300	1978	(Sweden) Swedish	Karlskoga	(United Kingdom) Barry Sheene	(Japan) Suzuki	(Australia) Gregg Hansford	(Japan) Kawasaki	(Italy) Pier Paolo Bianchi	(Italy) Minarelli				
400	1986	(France) French	Paul Ricard	(United States) Eddie Lawson	(Japan) Yamaha	(Venezuela) Carlos Lavado	(Japan) Yamaha	(Italy) Luca Cadalora	(Italy) Garelli				
500	1993	(Europe) European	Catalunya	(United States) Wayne Rainey	(Japan) Yamaha	(Italy) Max Biaggi	(Japan) Yamaha	(Japan) Noboru Ueda	(Japan) Honda				
600	2000	(Catalonia) Catalan	Catalunya	(United States) Kenny Roberts Jr.	(Japan) Suzuki	(France) Olivier Jacque	(Japan) Yamaha	(Italy) Simone Sanna	(Italy) Aprilia				
700	2006	(Germany) German	Sachsenring	(Italy) Valentino Rossi	(Japan) Yamaha	(Japan) Yuki Takahashi	(Japan) Honda	(Italy) Mattia Pasini	(Italy) Aprilia				
800	2012	(France) French	Le Mans	(Spain) Jorge Lorenzo	(Japan) Yamaha	(Switzerland) Thomas Lüthi	(Switzerland) Suter	(France) Louis Rossi	(United Kingdom) FTR Honda				
900	2017	Aragon	Aragon	(Spain) Marc Márquez	(Japan) Honda	(Italy) Franco Morbidelli	(Germany) Kalex	(Spain) Joan Mir	(Japan) Honda				
1000	2023	(France) French	Le Mans	(Italy) Marco Bezzecchi	(Italy) Ducati	(Italy) Tony Arbolino	(Germany) Kalex	(Spain) Daniel Holgado	(Austria) KTM				

==== Defunct classes ====
Grand Prix motorcycle races by multiples of 100
Race number	Season	Grand Prix	Circuit	Winners							
Race number	Season	Grand Prix	Circuit	350cc		50cc		MotoE			
Race number	Season	Grand Prix	Circuit	350cc		50cc		Race 1		Race 2	
Race number	Season	Grand Prix	Circuit	Rider	Constructor	Rider	Constructor	Rider	Constructor	Rider	Constructor
100	1962	(Spain) Spanish	Montjuïc			(West Germany) Hans-Georg Anscheidt	(West Germany) Kreidler				
200	1970	(Belgium) Belgian	Spa-Francorchamps			(Netherlands) Aalt Toersen	(Netherlands) Jamathi				
300	1978	(Sweden) Swedish	Karlskoga	(Australia) Gregg Hansford	(Japan) Kawasaki						
1000	2023	(France) French	Le Mans					(Spain) Jordi Torres	(Italy) Ducati	(Italy) Matteo Ferrari	(Italy) Ducati

== Races by season ==
=== 1949–1959 ===
Rnd	1949	1950	1951	1952	1953	1954	1955	1956	1957	1958	1959
1	Isle of Man	Isle of Man	(Spain) Spanish	(Switzerland) Swiss	Isle of Man	(France) French	(Spain) Spanish	Isle of Man	(West Germany) West German	Isle of Man	(France) French
2	(Switzerland) Swiss	(Belgium) Belgian	(Switzerland) Swiss	Isle of Man	(Netherlands) Dutch	Isle of Man	(France) French	(Netherlands) Dutch	Isle of Man	(Netherlands) Dutch	Isle of Man
3	(Netherlands) Dutch	(Netherlands) Dutch	Isle of Man	(Netherlands) Dutch	(Belgium) Belgian	Ulster	Isle of Man	(Belgium) Belgian	(Netherlands) Dutch	(Belgium) Belgian	(West Germany) West German
4	(Belgium) Belgian	(Switzerland) Swiss	(Belgium) Belgian	(Belgium) Belgian	(West Germany) West German	(Belgium) Belgian	(West Germany) West German	(West Germany) West German	(Belgium) Belgian	(West Germany) West German	(Netherlands) Dutch
5	Ulster	Ulster	(Netherlands) Dutch	(West Germany) West German	(France) French	(Netherlands) Dutch	(Belgium) Belgian	Ulster	Ulster	(Sweden) Swedish	(Belgium) Belgian
6	(Italy) Nations	(Italy) Nations	(France) French	Ulster	Ulster	(West Germany) West German	(Netherlands) Dutch	(Italy) Nations	(Italy) Nations	Ulster	(Sweden) Swedish
7			Ulster	(Italy) Nations	(Switzerland) Swiss	(Switzerland) Swiss	Ulster			(Italy) Nations	Ulster
8			(Italy) Nations	(Spain) Spanish	(Italy) Nations	(Italy) Nations	(Italy) Nations				(Italy) Nations
9					(Spain) Spanish	(Spain) Spanish					

=== 1960–1969 ===
Rnd	1960	1961	1962	1963	1964	1965	1966	1967	1968	1969
1	(France) French	(Spain) Spanish	(Spain) Spanish	(Spain) Spanish	United States	United States	(Spain) Spanish	(Spain) Spanish	(West Germany) West German	(Spain) Spanish
2	Isle of Man	(West Germany) West German	(France) French	(West Germany) West German	(Spain) Spanish	(West Germany) West German	(West Germany) West German	(West Germany) West German	(Spain) Spanish	(West Germany) West German
3	(Netherlands) Dutch	(France) French	Isle of Man	(France) French	(France) French	(Spain) Spanish	(France) French	(France) French	Isle of Man	(France) French
4	(Belgium) Belgian	Isle of Man	(Netherlands) Dutch	Isle of Man	Isle of Man	(France) French	(Netherlands) Dutch	Isle of Man	(Netherlands) Dutch	Isle of Man
5	(West Germany) West German	(Netherlands) Dutch	(Belgium) Belgian	(Netherlands) Dutch	(Netherlands) Dutch	Isle of Man	(Belgium) Belgian	(Netherlands) Dutch	(Belgium) Belgian	(Netherlands) Dutch
6	Ulster	(Belgium) Belgian	(West Germany) West German	(Belgium) Belgian	(Belgium) Belgian	(Netherlands) Dutch	(East Germany) East German	(Belgium) Belgian	(East Germany) East German	(Belgium) Belgian
7	(Italy) Nations	(East Germany) East German	Ulster	Ulster	(West Germany) West German	(Belgium) Belgian	(Czechoslovakia) Czechoslovak	(East Germany) East German	(Czechoslovakia) Czechoslovak	(East Germany) East German
8		Ulster	(East Germany) East German	(East Germany) East German	(East Germany) East German	(East Germany) East German	(Finland) Finnish	(Czechoslovakia) Czechoslovak	(Finland) Finnish	(Czechoslovakia) Czechoslovak
9		(Italy) Nations	(Italy) Nations	(Finland) Finnish	Ulster	(Czechoslovakia) Czechoslovak	Ulster	(Finland) Finnish	Ulster	(Finland) Finnish
10		(Sweden) Swedish	(Finland) Finnish	(Italy) Nations	(Finland) Finnish	Ulster	Isle of Man	Ulster	(Italy) Nations	Ulster
11		(Argentina) Argentine	(Argentina) Argentine	(Argentina) Argentine	(Italy) Nations	(Finland) Finnish	(Italy) Nations	(Italy) Nations		(Italy) Nations
12				(Japan) Japanese	(Japan) Japanese	(Italy) Nations	(Japan) Japanese	(Canada) Canadian		(Socialist Federal Republic of Yugoslavia) Yugoslavian
13						(Japan) Japanese		(Japan) Japanese		

=== 1970–1979 ===
Rnd	1970	1971	1972	1973	1974	1975	1976	1977	1978	1979
1	(West Germany) West German	(Austria) Austrian	(West Germany) German	(France) French	(France) French	(France) French	(France) French	(Venezuela) Venezuelan	(Venezuela) Venezuelan	(Venezuela) Venezuelan
2	(France) French	(West Germany) West German	(France) French	(Austria) Austrian	(West Germany) German	(Spain) Spanish	(Austria) Austrian	(Austria) Austrian	(Spain) Spanish	(Austria) Austrian
3	(Socialist Federal Republic of Yugoslavia) Yugoslavian	Isle of Man	(Austria) Austrian	(West Germany) West German	(Austria) Austrian	(Austria) Austrian	(Italy) Nations	(West Germany) West German	(Austria) Austrian	(West Germany) West German
4	Isle of Man	(Netherlands) Dutch	(Italy) Nations	(Italy) Nations	(Italy) Nations	(West Germany) West German	(Socialist Federal Republic of Yugoslavia) Yugoslavian	(Italy) Nations	(France) French	(Italy) Nations
5	(Netherlands) Dutch	(Belgium) Belgian	Isle of Man	Isle of Man	Isle of Man	(Italy) Nations	Isle of Man	(Spain) Spanish	(Italy) Nations	(Spain) Spanish
6	(Belgium) Belgian	(East Germany) East German	(Socialist Federal Republic of Yugoslavia) Yugoslavian	(Socialist Federal Republic of Yugoslavia) Yugoslavian	(Netherlands) Dutch	Isle of Man	(Netherlands) Dutch	(France) French	(Netherlands) Dutch	(Socialist Federal Republic of Yugoslavia) Yugoslavian
7	(East Germany) East German	(Czechoslovakia) Czechoslovak	(Netherlands) Dutch	(Netherlands) Dutch	(Belgium) Belgian	(Netherlands) Dutch	(Belgium) Belgian	(Socialist Federal Republic of Yugoslavia) Yugoslavian	(Belgium) Belgian	(Netherlands) Dutch
8	(Czechoslovakia) Czechoslovak	(Sweden) Swedish	(Belgium) Belgian	(Belgium) Belgian	(Sweden) Swedish	(Belgium) Belgian	(Sweden) Swedish	(Netherlands) Dutch	(Sweden) Swedish	(Belgium) Belgian
9	(Finland) Finnish	(Finland) Finnish	(East Germany) East German	(Czechoslovakia) Czechoslovak	(Finland) Finnish	(Sweden) Swedish	(Finland) Finnish	(Belgium) Belgian	(Finland) Finnish	(Sweden) Swedish
10	Ulster	Ulster	(Czechoslovakia) Czechoslovak	(Sweden) Swedish	(Czechoslovakia) Czechoslovak	(Finland) Finnish	(Czechoslovakia) Czechoslovak	(Sweden) Swedish	(United Kingdom) British	(Finland) Finnish
11	(Italy) Nations	(Italy) Nations	(Sweden) Swedish	(Finland) Finnish	(Socialist Federal Republic of Yugoslavia) Yugoslavian	(Czechoslovakia) Czechoslovak	(West Germany) West German	(Finland) Finnish	(West Germany) West German	(United Kingdom) British
12	(Spain) Spanish	(Spain) Spanish	(Finland) Finnish	(Spain) Spanish	(Spain) Spanish	(Socialist Federal Republic of Yugoslavia) Yugoslavian	(Spain) Spanish	(Czechoslovakia) Czechoslovak	(Czechoslovakia) Czechoslovak	(Czechoslovakia) Czechoslovak
13			(Spain) Spanish					(United Kingdom) British	(Socialist Federal Republic of Yugoslavia) Yugoslavian	(France) French

=== 1980–1989 ===
Rnd	1980	1981	1982	1983	1984	1985	1986	1987	1988	1989
1	(Italy) Nations	(Argentina) Argentine	(Argentina) Argentine	(South Africa) South African	(South Africa) South African	(South Africa) South African	(Spain) Spanish	(Japan) Japanese	(Japan) Japanese	(Japan) Japanese
2	(Spain) Spanish	(Austria) Austrian	(Austria) Austrian	(France) French	(Italy) Nations	(Spain) Spanish	(Italy) Nations	(Spain) Spanish	United States	(Australia) Australian
3	(France) French	(West Germany) West German	(France) French	(Italy) Nations	(Spain) Spanish	(West Germany) West German	(West Germany) West German	(West Germany) West German	(Spain) Spanish	United States
4	(Socialist Federal Republic of Yugoslavia) Yugoslavian	(Italy) Nations	(Spain) Spanish	(West Germany) West German	(Austria) Austrian	(Italy) Nations	(Austria) Austrian	(Italy) Nations	(Andalusia) Expo 92	(Spain) Spanish
5	(Netherlands) Dutch	(France) French	(Italy) Nations	(Spain) Spanish	(West Germany) West German	(Austria) Austrian	(Socialist Federal Republic of Yugoslavia) Yugoslavian	(Austria) Austrian	(Italy) Nations	(Italy) Nations
6	(Belgium) Belgian	(Spain) Spanish	(Netherlands) Dutch	(Austria) Austrian	(France) French	(Socialist Federal Republic of Yugoslavia) Yugoslavian	(Netherlands) Dutch	(Socialist Federal Republic of Yugoslavia) Yugoslavian	(West Germany) West German	(West Germany) West German
7	(Finland) Finnish	(Socialist Federal Republic of Yugoslavia) Yugoslavian	(Belgium) Belgian	(Socialist Federal Republic of Yugoslavia) Yugoslavian	(Socialist Federal Republic of Yugoslavia) Yugoslavian	(Netherlands) Dutch	(Belgium) Belgian	(Netherlands) Dutch	(Austria) Austrian	(Austria) Austrian
8	(United Kingdom) British	(Netherlands) Dutch	(Socialist Federal Republic of Yugoslavia) Yugoslavian	(Netherlands) Dutch	(Netherlands) Dutch	(Belgium) Belgian	(France) French	(France) French	(Netherlands) Dutch	(Socialist Federal Republic of Yugoslavia) Yugoslavian
9	(Czechoslovakia) Czechoslovak	(Belgium) Belgian	(United Kingdom) British	(Belgium) Belgian	(Belgium) Belgian	(France) French	(United Kingdom) British	(United Kingdom) British	(Belgium) Belgian	(Netherlands) Dutch
10	(West Germany) West German	San Marino	(Sweden) Swedish	(United Kingdom) British	(United Kingdom) British	(United Kingdom) British	(Sweden) Swedish	(Sweden) Swedish	(Socialist Federal Republic of Yugoslavia) Yugoslavian	(Belgium) Belgian
11		(United Kingdom) British	(Finland) Finnish	(Sweden) Swedish	(Sweden) Swedish	(Sweden) Swedish	San Marino	(Czechoslovakia) Czechoslovak	(France) French	(France) French
12		(Finland) Finnish	(Czechoslovakia) Czechoslovak	San Marino	San Marino	San Marino	Baden-Württemberg	San Marino	(United Kingdom) British	(United Kingdom) British
13		(Sweden) Swedish	San Marino					(Portugal) Portuguese	(Sweden) Swedish	(Sweden) Swedish
14		(Czechoslovakia) Czechoslovak	(West Germany) West German					(Brazil) Brazilian	(Czechoslovakia) Czechoslovak	(Czechoslovakia) Czechoslovak
15								(Argentina) Argentine	(Brazil) Brazilian	(Brazil) Brazilian

=== 1990–1999 ===
Rnd	1990	1991	1992	1993	1994	1995	1996	1997	1998	1999
1	(Japan) Japanese	(Japan) Japanese	(Japan) Japanese	(Australia) Australian	(Australia) Australian	(Australia) Australian	(Malaysia) Malaysian	(Malaysia) Malaysian	(Japan) Japanese	(Malaysia) Malaysian
2	United States	(Australia) Australian	(Australia) Australian	(Malaysia) Malaysian	(Malaysia) Malaysian	(Malaysia) Malaysian	(Indonesia) Indonesian	(Japan) Japanese	(Malaysia) Malaysian	(Japan) Japanese
3	(Spain) Spanish	United States	(Malaysia) Malaysian	(Japan) Japanese	(Japan) Japanese	(Japan) Japanese	(Japan) Japanese	(Spain) Spanish	(Spain) Spanish	(Spain) Spanish
4	(Italy) Nations	(Spain) Spanish	(Spain) Spanish	(Spain) Spanish	(Spain) Spanish	(Spain) Spanish	(Spain) Spanish	(Italy) Italian	(Italy) Italian	(France) French
5	(West Germany) West German	(Italy) Italian	(Italy) Italian	(Austria) Austrian	(Austria) Austrian	(Germany) German	(Italy) Italian	(Austria) Austrian	(France) French	(Italy) Italian
6	(Austria) Austrian	(Germany) German	(Europe) European	(Germany) German	(Germany) German	(Italy) Italian	(France) French	(France) French	(Community of Madrid) Madrid	(Catalonia) Catalan
7	(Socialist Federal Republic of Yugoslavia) Yugoslavian	(Austria) Austrian	(Germany) German	(Netherlands) Dutch	(Netherlands) Dutch	(Netherlands) Dutch	(Netherlands) Dutch	(Netherlands) Dutch	(Netherlands) Dutch	(Netherlands) Dutch
8	(Netherlands) Dutch	(Europe) European	(Netherlands) Dutch	(Europe) European	(Italy) Italian	(France) French	(Germany) German	(Bologna) Imola	(United Kingdom) British	(United Kingdom) British
9	(Belgium) Belgian	(Netherlands) Dutch	(Hungary) Hungarian	San Marino	(France) French	(United Kingdom) British	(United Kingdom) British	(Germany) German	(Germany) German	(Germany) German
10	(France) French	(France) French	(France) French	(United Kingdom) British	(United Kingdom) British	(Czech Republic) Czech	(Austria) Austrian	(Rio de Janeiro (state)) Rio de Janeiro	(Czech Republic) Czech	(Czech Republic) Czech
11	(United Kingdom) British	(United Kingdom) British	(United Kingdom) British	(Czech Republic) Czech	(Czech Republic) Czech	(Rio de Janeiro (state)) Rio de Janeiro	(Czech Republic) Czech	(United Kingdom) British	(Bologna) Imola	(Bologna) Imola
12	(Sweden) Swedish	San Marino	(Brazil) Brazilian	(Italy) Italian	United States	(Argentina) Argentine	(Bologna) Imola	(Czech Republic) Czech	(Catalonia) Catalan	(Valencian Community) Valencia
13	(Czechoslovakia) Czechoslovak	(Czechoslovakia) Czechoslovak	(South Africa) South African	United States	(Argentina) Argentine	(Europe) European	(Catalonia) Catalan	(Catalonia) Catalan	(Australia) Australian	(Australia) Australian
14	(Hungary) Hungarian	(Pays de la Loire) Vitesse du Mans		FIM	(Europe) European		(Rio de Janeiro (state)) Rio de Janeiro	(Indonesia) Indonesian	(Argentina) Argentine	(South Africa) South African
15	(Australia) Australian	(Malaysia) Malaysian					(Australia) Australian	(Australia) Australian		(Rio de Janeiro (state)) Rio de Janeiro
16										(Argentina) Argentine

=== 2000–2009 ===
Rnd	2000	2001	2002	2003	2004	2005	2006	2007	2008	2009
1	(South Africa) South African	(Japan) Japanese	(Japan) Japanese	(Japan) Japanese	(South Africa) South African	(Spain) Spanish	(Spain) Spanish	Qatar	Qatar	Qatar
2	(Malaysia) Malaysian	(South Africa) South African	(South Africa) South African	(South Africa) South African	(Spain) Spanish	(Portugal) Portuguese	Qatar	(Spain) Spanish	(Spain) Spanish	(Japan) Japanese
3	(Japan) Japanese	(Spain) Spanish	(Spain) Spanish	(Spain) Spanish	(France) French	(China) Chinese	(Turkey) Turkish	(China) Chinese	(Portugal) Portuguese	(Spain) Spanish
4	(Spain) Spanish	(France) French	(France) French	(France) French	(Italy) Italian	(France) French	(China) Chinese	(Turkey) Turkish	(China) Chinese	(France) French
5	(France) French	(Italy) Italian	(Italy) Italian	(Italy) Italian	(Catalonia) Catalan	(Italy) Italian	(France) French	(France) French	(France) French	(Italy) Italian
6	(Italy) Italian	(Catalonia) Catalan	(Catalonia) Catalan	(Catalonia) Catalan	(Netherlands) Dutch	(Catalonia) Catalan	(Italy) Italian	(Italy) Italian	(Italy) Italian	(Catalonia) Catalan
7	(Catalonia) Catalan	(Netherlands) Dutch	(Netherlands) Dutch	(Netherlands) Dutch	(Rio de Janeiro (state)) Rio de Janeiro	(Netherlands) Dutch	(Catalonia) Catalan	(Catalonia) Catalan	(Catalonia) Catalan	(Netherlands) Dutch
8	(Netherlands) Dutch	(United Kingdom) British	(United Kingdom) British	(United Kingdom) British	(Germany) German	United States	(Netherlands) Dutch	(United Kingdom) British	(United Kingdom) British	United States
9	(United Kingdom) British	(Germany) German	(Germany) German	(Germany) German	(United Kingdom) British	(United Kingdom) British	(United Kingdom) British	(Netherlands) Dutch	(Netherlands) Dutch	(Germany) German
10	(Germany) German	(Czech Republic) Czech	(Czech Republic) Czech	(Czech Republic) Czech	(Czech Republic) Czech	(Germany) German	(Germany) German	(Germany) German	(Germany) German	(United Kingdom) British
11	(Czech Republic) Czech	(Portugal) Portuguese	(Portugal) Portuguese	(Portugal) Portuguese	(Portugal) Portuguese	(Czech Republic) Czech	United States	United States	United States	(Czech Republic) Czech
12	(Portugal) Portuguese	(Valencian Community) Valencia	(Rio de Janeiro (state)) Rio de Janeiro	(Rio de Janeiro (state)) Rio de Janeiro	(Japan) Japanese	(Japan) Japanese	(Czech Republic) Czech	(Czech Republic) Czech	(Czech Republic) Czech	Indianapolis
13	(Valencian Community) Valencia	(Tochigi Prefecture) Pacific	(Tochigi Prefecture) Pacific	(Tochigi Prefecture) Pacific	Qatar	(Malaysia) Malaysian	(Malaysia) Malaysian	San Marino	San Marino	San Marino
14	(Rio de Janeiro (state)) Rio de Janeiro	(Australia) Australian	(Malaysia) Malaysian	(Malaysia) Malaysian	(Malaysia) Malaysian	Qatar	(Australia) Australian	(Portugal) Portuguese	Indianapolis	(Portugal) Portuguese
15	(Tochigi Prefecture) Pacific	(Malaysia) Malaysian	(Australia) Australian	(Australia) Australian	(Australia) Australian	(Australia) Australian	(Japan) Japanese	(Japan) Japanese	(Japan) Japanese	(Australia) Australian
16	(Australia) Australian	(Rio de Janeiro (state)) Rio de Janeiro	(Valencian Community) Valencia	(Valencian Community) Valencia	(Valencian Community) Valencia	(Turkey) Turkish	(Portugal) Portuguese	(Australia) Australian	(Australia) Australian	(Malaysia) Malaysian
17						(Valencian Community) Valencia	(Valencian Community) Valencia	(Malaysia) Malaysian	(Malaysia) Malaysian	(Valencian Community) Valencia
18								(Valencian Community) Valencia	(Valencian Community) Valencia	

=== 2010–2019 ===
Rnd	2010	2011	2012	2013	2014	2015	2016	2017	2018	2019
1	Qatar	Qatar	Qatar	Qatar	Qatar	Qatar	Qatar	Qatar	Qatar	Qatar
2	(Spain) Spanish	(Spain) Spanish	(Spain) Spanish	(United States) Americas	(United States) Americas	(United States) Americas	(Argentina) Argentine	(Argentina) Argentine	(Argentina) Argentine	(Argentina) Argentine
3	(France) French	(Portugal) Portuguese	(Portugal) Portuguese	(Spain) Spanish	(Argentina) Argentine	(Argentina) Argentine	(United States) Americas	(United States) Americas	(United States) Americas	(United States) Americas
4	(Italy) Italian	(France) French	(France) French	(France) French	(Spain) Spanish	(Spain) Spanish	(Spain) Spanish	(Spain) Spanish	(Spain) Spanish	(Spain) Spanish
5	(United Kingdom) British	(Catalonia) Catalan	(Catalonia) Catalan	(Italy) Italian	(France) French	(France) French	(France) French	(France) French	(France) French	(France) French
6	(Netherlands) Dutch	(United Kingdom) British	(United Kingdom) British	(Catalonia) Catalan	(Italy) Italian	(Italy) Italian	(Italy) Italian	(Italy) Italian	(Italy) Italian	(Italy) Italian
7	(Catalonia) Catalan	(Netherlands) Dutch	(Netherlands) Dutch	(Netherlands) Dutch	(Catalonia) Catalan	(Catalonia) Catalan	(Catalonia) Catalan	(Catalonia) Catalan	(Catalonia) Catalan	(Catalonia) Catalan
8	(Germany) German	(Italy) Italian	(Germany) German	(Germany) German	(Netherlands) Dutch	(Netherlands) Dutch	(Netherlands) Dutch	(Netherlands) Dutch	(Netherlands) Dutch	(Netherlands) Dutch
9	United States	(Germany) German	(Italy) Italian	United States	(Germany) German	(Germany) German	(Germany) German	(Germany) German	(Germany) German	(Germany) German
10	(Czech Republic) Czech	United States	United States	Indianapolis	Indianapolis	Indianapolis	(Austria) Austrian	(Czech Republic) Czech	(Czech Republic) Czech	(Czech Republic) Czech
11	Indianapolis	(Czech Republic) Czech	Indianapolis	(Czech Republic) Czech	(Czech Republic) Czech	(Czech Republic) Czech	(Czech Republic) Czech	(Austria) Austrian	(Austria) Austrian	(Austria) Austrian
12	San Marino	Indianapolis	(Czech Republic) Czech	(United Kingdom) British	(United Kingdom) British	(United Kingdom) British	(United Kingdom) British	(United Kingdom) British	San Marino	(United Kingdom) British
13	Aragon	San Marino	San Marino	San Marino	San Marino	San Marino	San Marino	San Marino	Aragon	San Marino
14	(Japan) Japanese	Aragon	Aragon	Aragon	Aragon	Aragon	Aragon	Aragon	Thailand	Aragon
15	(Malaysia) Malaysian	(Japan) Japanese	(Japan) Japanese	(Malaysia) Malaysian	(Japan) Japanese	(Japan) Japanese	(Japan) Japanese	(Japan) Japanese	(Japan) Japanese	Thailand
16	(Australia) Australian	(Australia) Australian	(Malaysia) Malaysian	(Australia) Australian	(Australia) Australian	(Australia) Australian	(Australia) Australian	(Australia) Australian	(Australia) Australian	(Japan) Japanese
17	(Portugal) Portuguese	(Malaysia) Malaysian	(Australia) Australian	(Japan) Japanese	(Malaysia) Malaysian	(Malaysia) Malaysian	(Malaysia) Malaysian	(Malaysia) Malaysian	(Malaysia) Malaysian	(Australia) Australian
18	(Valencian Community) Valencia	(Valencian Community) Valencia	(Valencian Community) Valencia	(Valencian Community) Valencia	(Valencian Community) Valencia	(Valencian Community) Valencia	(Valencian Community) Valencia	(Valencian Community) Valencia	(Valencian Community) Valencia	(Malaysia) Malaysian
19										(Valencian Community) Valencia

=== 2020–2026 ===
Rnd	2020	2021	2022	2023	2024	2025	2026
1	Qatar	Qatar	Qatar	(Portugal) Portuguese	Qatar	Thailand	Thailand
2	(Spain) Spanish	(Qatar) Doha	(Indonesia) Indonesian	(Argentina) Argentine	(Portugal) Portuguese	(Argentina) Argentine	(Brazil) Brazilian
3	(Andalusia) Andalusian	(Portugal) Portuguese	(Argentina) Argentine	(United States) Americas	(United States) Americas	(United States) Americas	United States
4	(Czech Republic) Czech	(Spain) Spanish	(United States) Americas	(Spain) Spanish	(Spain) Spanish	Qatar	(Spain) Spanish
5	(Austria) Austrian	(France) French	(Portugal) Portuguese	(France) French	(France) French	(Spain) Spanish	(France) French
6	(Styria) Styrian	(Italy) Italian	(Spain) Spanish	(Italy) Italian	(Catalonia) Catalan	(France) French	(Catalonia) Catalan
7	San Marino	(Catalonia) Catalan	(France) French	(Germany) German	(Italy) Italian	(United Kingdom) British	(Italy) Italian
8	(Emilia-Romagna) Emilia Romagna	(Germany) German	(Italy) Italian	(Netherlands) Dutch	(Netherlands) Dutch	Aragon	(Hungary) Hungarian
9	(Catalonia) Catalan	(Netherlands) Dutch	(Catalonia) Catalan	(United Kingdom) British	(Germany) German	(Italy) Italian	(Czech Republic) Czech
10	(France) French	(Styria) Styrian	(Germany) German	(Austria) Austrian	(United Kingdom) British	(Netherlands) Dutch	(Netherlands) Dutch
11	Aragon	(Austria) Austrian	(Netherlands) Dutch	(Catalonia) Catalan	(Austria) Austrian	(Germany) German	(Germany) German
12	(Province of Teruel) Teruel	(United Kingdom) British	(United Kingdom) British	San Marino	Aragon	(Czech Republic) Czech	(United Kingdom) British
13	(Europe) European	Aragon	(Austria) Austrian	(India) Indian	San Marino	(Austria) Austrian	Aragon
14	(Valencian Community) Valencia	San Marino	San Marino	(Japan) Japanese	(Emilia-Romagna) Emilia Romagna	(Hungary) Hungarian	San Marino
15	(Portugal) Portuguese	(United States) Americas	Aragon	(Indonesia) Indonesian	(Indonesia) Indonesian	(Catalonia) Catalan	(Austria) Austrian
16		(Emilia-Romagna) Emilia Romagna	(Japan) Japanese	(Australia) Australian	(Japan) Japanese	San Marino	(Japan) Japanese
17		(Portugal) Algarve	Thailand	Thailand	(Australia) Australian	(Japan) Japanese	(Indonesia) Indonesian
18		(Valencian Community) Valencia	(Australia) Australian	(Malaysia) Malaysian	Thailand	(Indonesia) Indonesian	(Malaysia) Malaysian
19			(Malaysia) Malaysian	Qatar	(Malaysia) Malaysian	(Australia) Australian	Qatar
20			(Valencian Community) Valencia	(Valencian Community) Valencia	Solidarity	(Malaysia) Malaysian	(Portugal) Portuguese
21						(Portugal) Portuguese	
22						(Valencian Community) Valencia	
