= Didier de Radiguès =

Belgian motorcycle racer

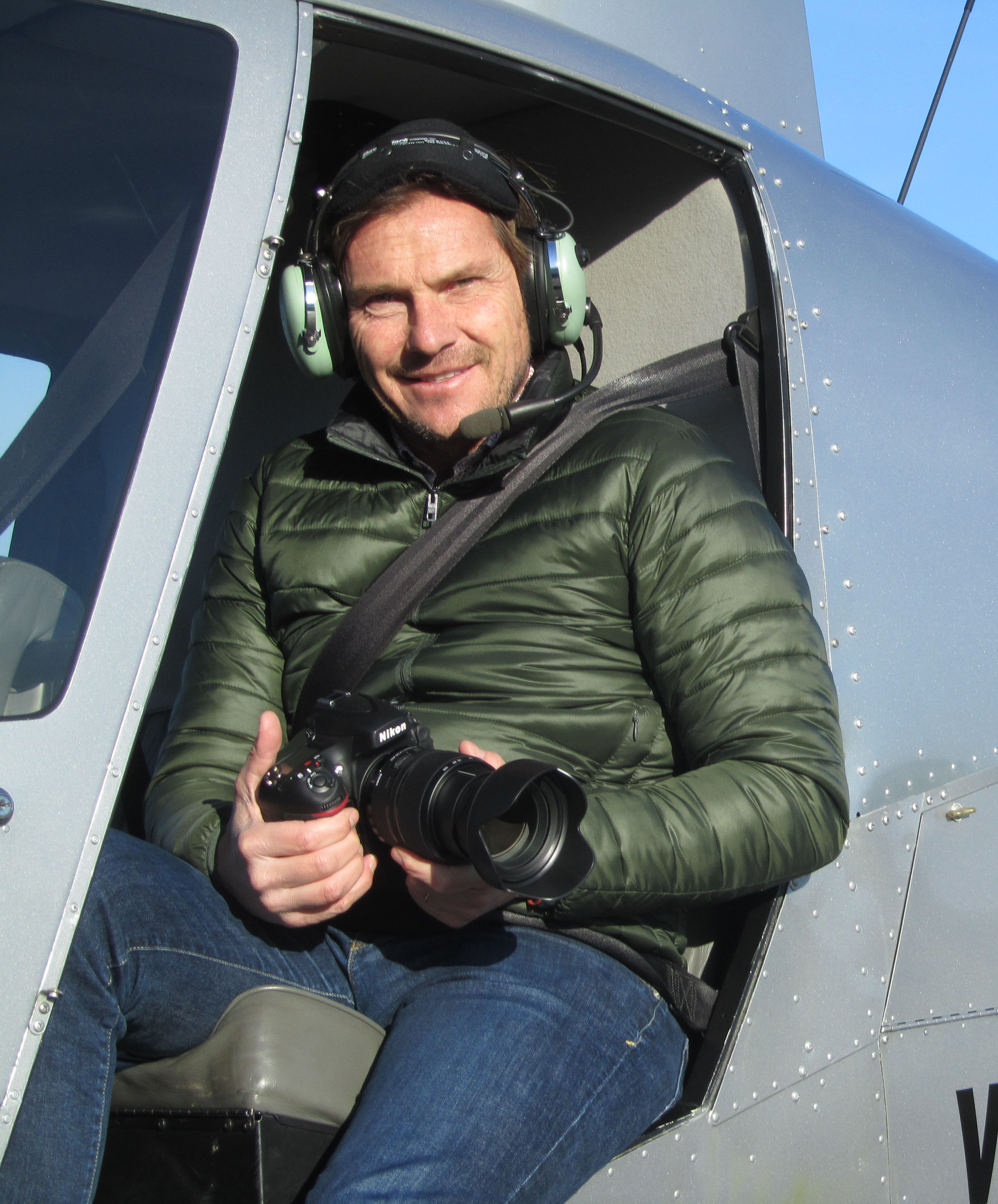
- Nationality: (Belgium) Belgian
Motorcycle racing career statistics
Grand Prix motorcycle racing
Active years	1980 - 1991
First race	1980 250cc Dutch TT
Last race	1991 500cc Malaysian Grand Prix
First win	1982 350cc Nations Grand Prix
Last win	1983 250cc Belgian Grand Prix
Team(s)	Yamaha, Cagiva, Suzuki
Championships	0
Starts / Wins / Podiums / Poles / F. laps / Points; 141 / 4 / 15 / 12 / 3 / 688

24 Hours of Le Mans career
- Years: 1998–2002
- Teams: Solution F, Kremer Racing, Team Rafanelli SRL, Dick Barbour Racing, MBD Sportscar Team
- Best finish: 28th (2001, 2002)
- Class wins: 0

Didier Marie Jean François Colette Ghislain de Radiguès de Chennevière (born on 27 March 1958) is a Belgian former professional motorcycle racer, auto racing driver and current artist. He also serves as a television sports color commentator for Belgium television, a Moto GP riders manager and as the owner of a motorcycle riding school. He competed in the FIM motorcycle Grand Prix world championships from 1980 to 1991.

== Motorsport career ==
Born in Leuven, de Radiguès, made his motorcycle Grand Prix debut in 1979, racing in the 500cc class. His best year was in 1982 when he won two races and finished second to Anton Mang in the 350cc world championship. He rode in 500cc for the Yamaha factory racing team in 1988 as a team-mate to Eddie Lawson and ended his career with the Suzuki team in 1991 as Kevin Schwantz' team-mate. He won four Grands Prix during his career, as well as the 1991 Macau Grand Prix, a non-championship event.

De Radiguès is the Belgium's most successful motorcycle road racer with four Grand Prix victories. In 1992, at the request of the riders, de Radiguès organized the International Motorcycle Riders Association which was then managed by Franco Uncini at IRTA.

After his motorcycle racing career, de Radiguès took up sports car endurance racing, winning the 1997 Belgian Procar Championship as well as the Spa 24 Hours race, and the championship in the American Le Mans Series in 2001. In 1998, de Radiguès entered the 24 Hours of Le Mans with fellow ex-motorcycle rider Wayne Gardner.

In 2003, de Radiguès began a motorcycle riding school in France.

In 2011, de Radiguès won the Belgian Touring Car Series (BTCS) championship alongside co-driver Philippe Stéveny, driving a Kia Pro Cee'd silhouette car. The pair secured the drivers' title during the final round of the season at Spa-Francorchamps in October. This marked the final season of the BTCS before its merger into the Belgian Racing Car Championship (BRCC).

== Television career ==
De Radiguès is also a Motorsport TV consultant, first on Club RTL and then on RTBF (since 2013), the two largest French-speaking Belgian TV channels. He gives commentary on Moto3, Moto2 and Moto GP races.

== Artistic career ==
De Radiguès started his artistic career in New York and Singapore, Brussels, Hong Kong and Paris. His first series called « From My Gazebo » is inspired by his many trips to the Bahamas. From his gazebo, planted in the heart of the Atlantic Ocean on a small island of the Exumas, de Radiguès captures the landscape around him. His latest series is called People Portrait.

== Motorcycle Grand Prix results ==
Points system from 1969 to 1987:

**Position**	1	2	3	4	5	6	7	8	9	10
**Points**	15	12	10	8	6	5	4	3	2	1

Points system from 1988 to 1992:

**Position**	1	2	3	4	5	6	7	8	9	10	11	12	13	14	15
**Points**	20	17	15	13	11	10	9	8	7	6	5	4	3	2	1

(key) (Races in bold indicate pole position; races in italics indicate fastest lap)

Year	Class	Team	Machine	1	2	3	4	5	6	7	8	9	10	11	12	13	14	15	Points	Rank	Wins
1980	250cc	Yamaha	TZ250	NAT -	ESP -	FRA -	YUG -	NED; 8	BEL -	FIN -	GBR -	CZE -	GER; 6						8	18th	0
1981	250cc	Johnson-Yamaha	TZ250	ARG; 9		GER -	NAT -	FRA -	ESP -		NED; 10	BEL; 5	RSM; 10	GBR; 6	FIN -	SWE; 8	CZE; 4		26	9th	0
1981	350cc	Johnson-Yamaha	TZ350	ARG -	AUT -	GER -	NAT -			YUG -	NED -			GBR; 4			CZE -		8	17th	0
1982	250cc	Chevallier-Yamaha	TZ250			FRA -	ESP -	NAT -	NED -	BEL; 3	**YUG**; 1	GBR; 10	SWE -	**FIN**; 2	CZE -	RSM -	GER -		38	6th	1
1982	350cc	Chevallier-Yamaha	TZ350	ARG; 3	AUT -	FRA; 2		NAT; 1	NED -			GBR; 2		FIN -	CZE; 1		GER -		64	2nd	2
1983	250cc	Chevallier-Yamaha	TZ250	RSA; 2	FRA; 4	NAT; 9	GER; 3	ESP; NC	**AUT**; 2	**YUG**; NC	NED; 7	**BEL**; 1	GBR; 9	**SWE**; 8					68	3rd	1
1983	500cc	Honda	NS500	RSA -	FRA; NC	NAT -	GER -	ESP; 13	AUT -	YUG -	NED -	BEL; NC	GBR; NC	SWE; 20	RSM; NC				0	-	0
1984	500cc	Elf-Chevallier Honda	NS500	RSA; 4	NAT; 12	ESP; NC	AUT; NC	GER; NC	FRA; 6	YUG; 6	NED; NC	BEL; NC	GBR; NC	SWE; NC	RSM; 5				24	9th	0
1985	500cc	Elf-Honda	NS500	RSA; 7	ESP; 6	GER; 5	NAT; 10	AUT; 6	YUG; 7	NED; 6	BEL; 7	FRA; NC	GBR; 4	SWE; 6	RSM; NC				47	8th	0
1986	500cc	Rollstar-Honda	NS500	ESP -	NAT; 5	GER; 5	AUT -	YUG -	NED; 9	BEL; 7	FRA; 8	GBR; 2	SWE; 6	RSM; 7					42	7th	0
1987	500cc	Cagiva	GP500	JPN; NC	ESP; NC	GER; 12	NAT; NC	AUT; 12	YUG -	NED; 6	FRA; NC	GBR; 6	SWE; 8	CZE; 12	RSM; NC	POR; NC	BRA; 4	ARG; NC	21	12th	0
1988	500cc	Marlboro-Yamaha	YZR500	JPN; 9	USA; 8	ESP; 8	EXP; 6	NAT; NC	GER; 7	AUT; 2	NED; 12	BEL; 4	YUG; 6	FRA; 7	GBR; 7	SWE; 7	CZE; NC	BRA; 9	120	7th	0
1989	250cc	Aprilia	RS250	JPN; 14	AUS; 9	USA; 14	ESP; NC	NAT; NC	GER; NC	AUT; 5	YUG; NC	NED; 6	**BEL**; NC	FRA; 9	GBR; NC	SWE; 7	CZE; 13	BRA; NC	51	12th	0
1990	250cc	Aprilia	RS250	JPN; NC	USA -	ESP; 9	NAT; NC	GER; NC	AUT; 9	YUG; NC	NED; 7	BEL; 2	FRA; 7	GBR; 11	SWE; 17	CZE; NC	HUN; 13	AUS; 7	66	12th	0
1991	500cc	Lucky Strike-Suzuki	RGV500	JPN; 14	AUS; 10	USA; 10	ESP; 8	ITA; NC	GER; 6	AUT; 8	EUR; 10	NED; 5	FRA; 7	GBR; 8	RSM; 8	CZE; 7	VDM; 8	MAL; 8	105	8th	0

== 24 Hours of Le Mans results ==
Year	Team	Co-Drivers	Car	Class	Laps	Pos.	Class Pos.
1998	(France) Solution F	(France) Philippe Gache (Australia) Wayne Gardner	Riley & Scott Mk III-Ford	LMP1	155	DNF	DNF
1999	(Germany) Kremer Racing	(Spain) Tomás Saldaña (South Africa) Grant Orbell	Lola B98/10-Ford	LMP	46	DNF	DNF
2000	(Italy) Team Rafanelli SRL	(Italy) Domenico Schiattarella (Italy) Emanuele Naspetti	Lola B2K/10-Judd	LMP900	154	DNF	DNF
2001	(United States) Dick Barbour Racing	(Germany) Sascha Maassen (Japan) Hideshi Matsuda	Reynard 01Q-LM-Judd	LMP675	95	DNF	DNF
2002	(United States) MBD Sportscar Team	(Venezuela) Milka Duno (Canada) John Graham	Panoz LMP07-Mugen	LMP900	259	DNF	DNF

Sporting positions
Preceded by Steve Hislop	Macau Motorcycle Grand Prix Winner; 1991	Succeeded by Carl Fogarty
