= List of 250cc/Moto2 World Riders' Champions =

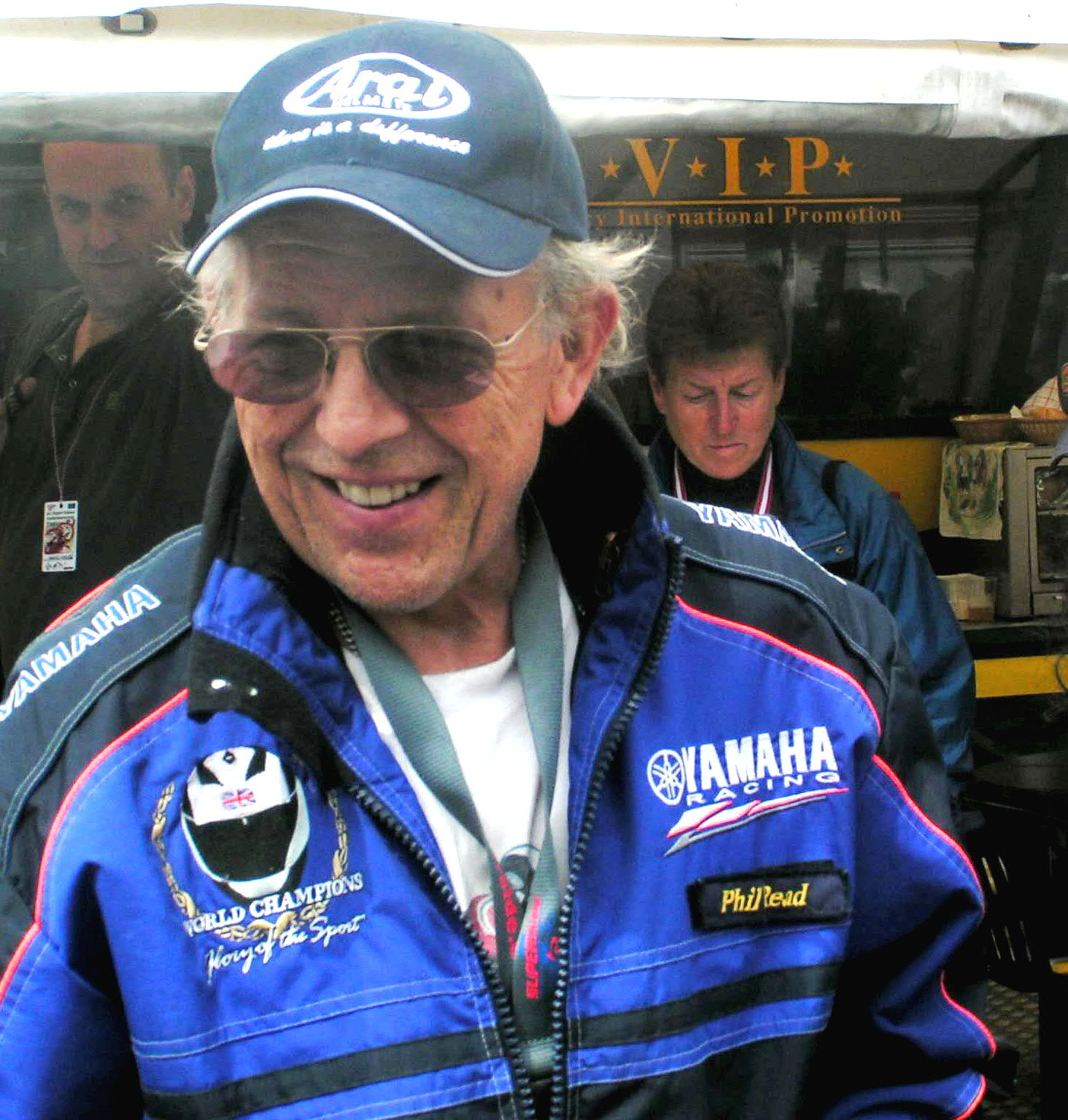
Phil Read, who, along with Max Biaggi, holds the most 250cc championships, with four.

Grand Prix motorcycle racing is the premier championship of motorcycle road racing, which has been divided into three classes: MotoGP, Moto2, and Moto3. Former classes that have been discontinued include 350cc, 250cc, 125cc, 50cc/80cc, MotoE, and Sidecar. The Grand Prix Road-Racing World Championship was established in 1949 by the sport's governing body, the Fédération Internationale de Motocyclisme (FIM), and is the oldest motorsport world championship in existence. Moto2 replaced the 250cc class in 2010; the 250cc referred to the size of the engines of the motorcycles that participated in the class. The engine configuration was an inline-four from 2010 to 2018 and has been an inline-three since 2019. The 250cc engines were replaced by 600cc engines, which were supplied by Honda to all teams. Since 2019, the Moto2 class engines have been supplied by Triumph to all teams, and the engine capacity has changed from 600cc to 765cc.

Points earned in these events count toward the riders' and constructors' world championships. These two are separate championships, but are based on the same point system. The number of points awarded at the end of each race to the top 15 qualifying riders depends on their placement. Points received by each finisher, from first 1st place to 15th place: 25, 20, 16, 13, 11, 10, 9, 8, 7, 6, 5, 4, 3, 2, 1. Historically, there have been several points systems. Results from all current Grands Prix count towards the championships; in the past, only a certain number of results were counted.

Phil Read and Max Biaggi have won the most championships, with four each. Dani Pedrosa is the youngest rider to win the championship; he was 19 years and 18 days old when he won in 2004. Italian riders have won the most championships; 16 riders have won a total of 25 championships. Spanish riders have won the second-most championships; 10 riders have won a total of 13 championships. Riders from the United Kingdom have won the third-most championships; four riders have won a total of nine championships. Bruno Ruffo won the inaugural championship in 1949. Hiroshi Aoyama was the last rider to win the 250cc championship in 2009. Toni Elías was the first rider to win the Moto2 championship in 2010. Diogo Moreira is the current champion; he won the 2025 Moto2 World Championship.

== Champions ==
Key
*	Champion also won 500cc Championship in that season
†	Champion also won 350cc Championship in that season
‡	Champion also won 125cc Championship in that season
—	Indicates information is not available

- The "Season" column refers to the season the competition was held, and wikilinks to the article about that season.
- The "Margin" column refers to the margin of points by which the winner defeated the runner-up.

=== By season ===
250cc/Moto2 World Riders' Champions by season
Season	Country	Rider	Constructor	Grands Prix	Poles	Wins	Podiums	Fastest laps	Points	Clinched	# of rounds remaining	Margin
1949	Italy	Bruno Ruffo	Moto Guzzi	4 (Note: Ruffo missed one race of the season.)	—	1	2	0	24	Round 4 of 4	0	5
1950	Italy	Dario Ambrosini	Benelli	4	—	3	4	3	24	Round 4 of 4	0	10
1951	Italy	Bruno Ruffo	Moto Guzzi	5 (Note: Ruffo missed four races of the season.)	—	2	4	3	22	Round 5 of 5	0	4
1952	Italy	Enrico Lorenzetti	Moto Guzzi	6 (Note: Lorenzetti missed two races of the season.)	—	2	5	2	28	Round 6 of 6	0	4
1953	West Germany	Werner Haas^{‡}	NSU	7 (Note: Haas missed one race of the season.)	—	2	5	2	28	Round 6 of 7	1	5
1954	West Germany	Werner Haas	NSU	7 (Note: Haas missed two races of the season.)	—	5	5	3	32	Round 4 of 7	3	6
1955	West Germany	Hermann Paul Müller	NSU	5	—	1	3	1	16	Round 5 of 5	0	2
1956	Italy	Carlo Ubbiali^{‡}	MV Agusta	6 (Note: Ubbiali missed one race of the season.)	—	5	5	4	32	Round 4 of 6	2	6
1957	United Kingdom	Cecil Sandford	Mondial	6	—	2	5	0	26	Round 5 of 6	1	10
1958	Italy	Tarquinio Provini	MV Agusta	6 (Note: Provini missed three races of the season.)	—	4	4	5	32	Round 5 of 6	1	16
1959	Italy	Carlo Ubbiali^{‡}	MV Agusta	7 (Note: Ubbiali missed two races of the season.)	—	2	5	2	28	Round 5 of 6	1	12
1960	Italy	Carlo Ubbiali^{‡}	MV Agusta	6	—	4	6	4	32	Round 6 of 6	0	4
1961	United Kingdom	Mike Hailwood	Honda	11 (Note: Hailwood missed one race of the season.)	—	4	8	3	44	Round 10 of 11	1	6
1962	Rhodesia and Nyasaland	Jim Redman^{†}	Honda	10 (Note: Redman missed one race of the season.)	—	6	9	2	48	Round 8 of 10	2	16
1963	Rhodesia and Nyasaland	Jim Redman^{†}	Honda	12 (Note: Redman missed one race of the season.)	—	4	9	2	44	Round 10 of 10	0	2
1964	United Kingdom	Phil Read	Yamaha	11 (Note: Read missed three races of the season.)	—	5	7	4	46	Round 10 of 11	1	4
1965	United Kingdom	Phil Read	Yamaha	12 (Note: Read missed three races of the season.)	—	7	9	6	56	Round 10 of 13	3	14
1966	United Kingdom	Mike Hailwood^{†}	Honda	12 (Note: Hailwood missed two races of the season.)	—	10	10	8	56	Round 7 of 12	5	22
1967	United Kingdom	Mike Hailwood^{†}	Honda	13 (Note: Hailwood missed one race of the season.)	—	5	8	7	50	Round 13 of 13	0	0 (Note: Hailwood won on countback by having five wins compared to Phil Read's four.)
1968	United Kingdom	Phil Read^{‡}	Yamaha	10 (Note: Read missed two races of the season.)	—	5	7	5	46	Round 10 of 10	0	0 (Note: Read and Bill Ivy had equal number of points, identical ranks obtained in all races (five wins and two second places each), and equal number of races in which they classified (seven races). To break the tie, their time in each of the four races where they both finished (namely the Dutch, East German, Czechoslovak, and Nations Grand Prix) were added up. Read's total time of 3:15:22.9 is faster than Ivy's 3:17:22.2, and thus Read was declared champion.)
1969	Australia	Kel Carruthers	Benelli	12 (Note: Carruthers missed three races of the season.)	—	3	7	3	89	Round 12 of 12	0	5
1970	United Kingdom	Rodney Gould	Yamaha	12 (Note: Gould missed three races of the season.)	—	6	9	3	102	Round 11 of 12	1	18
1971	United Kingdom	Phil Read	Yamaha	12 (Note: Read missed five races of the season.)	—	3	5	3	73	Round 12 of 12	0	5
1972	Finland	Jarno Saarinen	Yamaha	13 (Note: Saarinen missed two races of the season.)	—	4	9	6	94	Round 12 of 13	1	1
1973	West Germany	Dieter Braun	Yamaha	11 (Note: Braun missed five races of the season.)	—	4	5	2	80	Round 10 of 11	1	16
1974	Italy	Walter Villa	Harley-Davidson	10 (Note: Villa missed four races of the season.)	1	4	5	3	77	Round 8 of 10	2	19
1975	Italy	Walter Villa	Harley-Davidson	11 (Note: Villa missed five races of the season.)	5	5	6	4	85	Round 9 of 11	2	9
1976	Italy	Walter Villa †	Harley-Davidson	11 (Note: Villa missed two races of the season.)	7	7	8	7	90	Round 9 of 11	2	17
1977	Italy	Mario Lega	Morbidelli	12 (Note: Lega missed two races of the season.)	0	1	5	1	85	Round 11 of 12	1	13
1978	South Africa	Kork Ballington^{†}	Kawasaki	12 (Note: Ballington missed one race of the season.)	5	4	8	4	124	Round 12 of 12	0	6
1979	South Africa	Kork Ballington^{†}	Kawasaki	12 (Note: Ballington missed one race of the season.)	3	7	9	7	141	Round 10 of 12	2	60
1980	West Germany	Anton Mang	Kawasaki Krauser (Note: Anton Mang won the 1980 championship riding a Kawasaki Krauser motorcycle. FIM still counts this as a win under the Kawasaki brand.)	10	9	4	10	4	128	Round 7 of 10	3	41
1981	West Germany	Anton Mang^{†}	Kawasaki	12	10	10	11	9	160	Round 10 of 12	2	65
1982	France	Jean-Louis Tournadre	Yamaha	12	0	1	8	2	118	Round 12 of 12	0	1
1983	Venezuela	Carlos Lavado	Yamaha	11	1	4	6	2	100	Round 10 of 11	1	27
1984	France	Christian Sarron	Yamaha	12	3	3	8	1	109	Round 11 of 12	1	9
1985	United States	Freddie Spencer*	Honda	12 (Note: Spencer missed two races of the season.)	6	7	8	6	127	Round 10 of 12	2	3
1986	Venezuela	Carlos Lavado	Yamaha	11	7	6	8	3	114	Round 10 of 11	1	6
1987	West Germany	Anton Mang	Honda	15	1	8	8	1	136	Round 13 of 15	2	28
1988	Spain	Sito Pons	Honda	15	1	4	11	2	231	Round 15 of 15	0	10
1989	Spain	Sito Pons	Honda	15	3	7	12	7	262	Round 12 of 15	3	72
1990	United States	John Kocinski	Yamaha	15	8	7	12	8	223	Round 15 of 15	0	15
1991	Italy	Luca Cadalora	Honda	15	4	8	12	8	237	Round 14 of 15	1	17
1992	Italy	Luca Cadalora	Honda	13	2	7	9	3	203	Round 11 of 13	2	44
1993	Japan	Tetsuya Harada	Yamaha	14	2	4	7	3	197	Round 14 of 14	0	4
1994	Italy	Max Biaggi	Aprilia	14	7	5	10	8	234	Round 14 of 14	0	20
1995	Italy	Max Biaggi	Aprilia	13	9	8	12	7	283	Round 11 of 13	2	63
1996	Italy	Max Biaggi	Aprilia	15	8	9	11	9	274	Round 15 of 15	0	6
1997	Italy	Max Biaggi	Honda	15	3	5	10	2	250	Round 15 of 15	0	2
1998	Italy	Loris Capirossi	Aprilia	14	8	2	9	3	224	Round 14 of 14	0	23
1999	Italy	Valentino Rossi	Aprilia	16	5	9	12	8	309	Round 15 of 16	1	48
2000	France	Olivier Jacque	Yamaha	16	5	3	11	4	279	Round 16 of 16	0	7
2001	Japan	Daijiro Kato	Honda	16	6	11	13	9	322	Round 15 of 16	1	49
2002	Italy	Marco Melandri	Aprilia	16	2	9	12	4	298	Round 15 of 16	1	57
2003	San Marino	Manuel Poggiali	Aprilia	16	3	4	10	6	249	Round 16 of 16	0	14
2004	Spain	Dani Pedrosa	Honda	16	4	7	13	8	317	Round 15 of 16	1	61
2005	Spain	Dani Pedrosa	Honda	16	5	8	11	7	309	Round 14 of 16	2	55
2006	Spain	Jorge Lorenzo	Aprilia	16	10	8	11	1	289	Round 16 of 16	0	17
2007	Spain	Jorge Lorenzo	Aprilia	17	9	9	12	3	312	Round 16 of 17	1	52
2008	Italy	Marco Simoncelli	Gilera	16	7	6	12	4	281	Round 15 of 16	1	37
2009	Japan	Hiroshi Aoyama	Honda	16	2	4	7	4	261	Round 16 of 16	0	22
2010	Spain	Toni Elías	Moriwaki	17	3	7	8	2	271	Round 14 of 17	3	70
2011	Germany	Stefan Bradl	Kalex	17	7	4	11	3	274	Round 17 of 17	0	23
2012	Spain	Marc Márquez	Suter	17	7	9	14	5	328	Round 16 of 17	1	59
2013	Spain	Pol Espargaró	Kalex	17	6	6	10	4	265	Round 16 of 17	1	40
2014	Spain	Tito Rabat	Kalex	18	11	7	14	5	346	Round 17 of 18	1	57
2015	France	Johann Zarco	Kalex	18	7	8	14	1	352	Round 15 of 18	3	118
2016	France	Johann Zarco	Kalex	18	7	7	10	4	276	Round 17 of 18	1	42
2017	Italy	Franco Morbidelli	Kalex	18	6	8	12	8	308	Round 17 of 18	1	65
2018	Italy	Francesco Bagnaia	Kalex	18	6	8	12	3	306	Round 17 of 18	1	9
2019	Spain	Álex Márquez	Kalex	19	6	5	10	5	262	Round 18 of 19	1	3
2020	Italy	Enea Bastianini	Kalex	15	0	3	7	2	205	Round 15 of 15	0	9
2021	Australia	Remy Gardner	Kalex	18	3	5	12	3	311	Round 18 of 18	0	4
2022	Spain	Augusto Fernández	Kalex	20	2	4	9	5	271.5	Round 20 of 20	0	29.5
2023	Spain	Pedro Acosta	Kalex	20	3	7	14	8	332.5	Round 18 of 20	2	83
2024	Japan	Ai Ogura	Boscoscuro	20 (Note: Ogura missed one race of the season.)	2	3	8	1	274	Round 18 of 20	2	40
2025	Brazil	Diogo Moreira	Kalex	22	7	4	9	3	287	Round 22 of 22	0	30

=== Multiple champions ===
250cc/Moto2 multiple champions
Rider	Total	Seasons
(United Kingdom) Phil Read	4	1964, 1965, 1968, 1971
(Italy) Max Biaggi	4	1994, 1995, 1996, 1997
(Italy) Carlo Ubbiali	3	1956, 1959, 1960
(United Kingdom) Mike Hailwood	3	1961, 1966, 1967
(Italy) Walter Villa	3	1974, 1975, 1976
(Germany) Anton Mang	3	1980, 1981, 1987
(Italy) Bruno Ruffo	2	1949, 1951
(Germany) Werner Haas	2	1953, 1954
(Federation of Rhodesia and Nyasaland) Jim Redman	2	1962, 1963
(South Africa) Kork Ballington	2	1978, 1979
(Venezuela) Carlos Lavado	2	1983, 1986
(Spain) Sito Pons	2	1988, 1989
(Italy) Luca Cadalora	2	1991, 1992
(Spain) Dani Pedrosa	2	2004, 2005
(Spain) Jorge Lorenzo	2	2006, 2007
(France) Johann Zarco	2	2015, 2016

=== By constructor ===
250cc/Moto2 World Riders' Champions by constructor
Constructor	Total
(Japan) Honda	16
(Japan) Yamaha	14
(Germany) Kalex	13
(Italy) Aprilia	9
(Italy) MV Agusta	4
(Japan) Kawasaki	4
(Italy) Moto Guzzi	3
(Germany) NSU	3
(United States) Harley-Davidson	3
(Italy) Benelli	2
(Italy) Mondial	1
(Italy) Morbidelli	1
(Italy) Gilera	1
(Japan) Moriwaki	1
(Switzerland) Suter	1
(Italy) Boscoscuro	1

=== By nationality ===
250cc/Moto2 World Riders' Champions by nationality
Nationality	Riders	Total
Italy	16	25
Spain	10	13
United Kingdom	4	9
Germany	5	8
France	4	5
Japan	4	4
Rhodesia	1	2
South Africa	1	2
Venezuela	1	2
United States	2	2
Australia	2	2
Finland	1	1
San Marino	1	1
Brazil	1	1
