= 1982 Czechoslovak motorcycle Grand Prix =

(Czechoslovakia) 1982 Czechoslovak Grand Prix
Race details
- Race 12 of 14 races in the 1982 Grand Prix motorcycle racing season
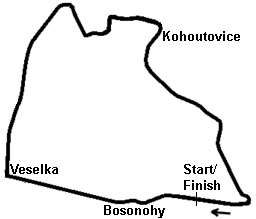
- Date: 29 August 1982
- Official name: Grand Prix ČSSR-Brno
- Location: Brno Circuit
- Course: Permanent racing facility; 5.403 km (3.357 mi)

500cc
Pole position
- Rider: No 500cc race was held
Podium
- First: No 500cc race was held
- Second: No 500cc race was held
- Third: No 500cc race was held

350cc
Pole position
- Rider: (Belgium) Didier de Radiguès
- Time: 3'43.690
Podium
- First: (Belgium) Didier de Radiguès
- Second: (West Germany) Anton Mang
- Third: (Switzerland) Jacques Cornu

250cc
Pole position
- Rider: (Belgium) Didier de Radiguès
- Time: 3'51.240
Podium
- First: (Venezuela) Carlos Lavado
- Second: (France) Jean-Louis Tournadre
- Third: (West Germany) Martin Wimmer

125cc
Pole position
- Rider: (Switzerland) Hans Müller
- Time: 4'05.380
Podium
- First: (Italy) Eugenio Lazzarini
- Second: (Venezuela) Iván Palazzese
- Third: (Spain) Ricardo Tormo

80cc
Pole position
- Rider: No 80cc race was held
Podium
- First: No 80cc race was held
- Second: No 80cc race was held
- Third: No 80cc race was held

50cc
Pole position
- Rider: No 50cc race was held
Podium
- First: No 50cc race was held
- Second: No 50cc race was held
- Third: No 50cc race was held

The 1982 Czechoslovak motorcycle Grand Prix was the twelfth race of the 1982 Grand Prix motorcycle racing season. It took place on the weekend of 27–29 August 1982 at the Masaryk Circuit in Brno, Czechoslovakia.

== 350cc classification ==
Pos.	Rider	Manufacturer	Time/Retired	Points
1	(Belgium) Didier de Radiguès	Chevallier	45'24.890	15
2	(Germany) Anton Mang	Kawasaki	45'37.940	12
3	(Switzerland) Jacques Cornu	Yamaha	46'00.950	10
4	(France) Thierry Espié	Chevallier	46'02.350	8
5	(France) Eric Saul	Chevallier	46'03.150	6
6	(Germany) Gustav Reiner	Yamaha	46'11.300	5
7	(France) Christian Sarron	Yamaha	46'22.580	4
8	(Austria) Siegfried Minich	Rotax	46'24.130	3
9	(United Kingdom) Tony Head	Armstrong	46'24.150	2
10	(Venezuela) Carlos Lavado	Yamaha	46'28.100	1
11	(South Africa) Alan North	Yamaha	46'37.960	
12	(Switzerland) Wolfgang von Muralt	Yamaha	46'43.450	
13	(Germany) Martin Wimmer	Yamaha	46'43.710	
14	(France) Jean-François Baldé	Kawasaki	46'44.920	
15	(France) Roger Sibille	Yamaha	47'02.400	
16	(France) Pierre Bolle	Yamaha	47'02.700	
17	(France) Patrick Fernandez	Bartol	47'19.700	
18	(United Kingdom) Steve Williams	Yamaha	47'22.180	
19	(Switzerland) Edwin Weibel	Yamaha	47'22.740	
20	(Finland) Reino Eskelinen	Yamaha	47'23.020	
21	(Switzerland) Andreas Berger	Yamaha	47'50.930	
22	(Switzerland) Bruno Lüscher	Yamaha	48'08.070	
23	(Switzerland) Hans Naef	Yamaha	48'08.600	
24	(Switzerland) Rudi Gächter	Yamaha	48'08.950	
25	(Czechoslovak Socialist Republic) Peter Balaz	Rotax	48'11.970	
26	(Czechoslovak Socialist Republic) Pavol Dekanek	Yamaha	48'22.970	

== 250cc classification ==
Pos.	Rider	Manufacturer	Time/Retired	Points
1	(Venezuela) Carlos Lavado	Yamaha	42'57.180	15
2	(France) Jean-Louis Tournadre	Yamaha	43'06.890	12
3	(Germany) Martin Wimmer	Yamaha	43'10.290	10
4	(Spain) Sito Pons	Rotax	43'11.000	8
5	(France) Patrick Fernandez	Bartol	43'12.050	6
6	(France) Roland Freymond	MBA	43'26.240	5
7	(France) Christian Estrosi	Pernod	43'34.620	4
8	(Germany) Anton Mang	Kawasaki	43'35.310	3
9	(Italy) Massimo Matteoni	Yamaha	43'35.620	2
10	(Belgium) Jean-Marc Toffolo	Rotax	43'35.970	1
11	(France) Jacques Bolle	Yamaha	43'36.320	
12	(Switzerland) Bruno Lüscher	Yamaha	44'11.270	
13	(United Kingdom) Tony Head	Armstrong	44'11.660	
14	(Germany) Herbert Besendörfer	Yamaha	44'26.310	
15	(Belgium) Etienne Geeraerd	Armstrong	44'27.440	
16	(Switzerland) Edwin Weibel	Yamaha	44'42.620	
17	(Finland) Eero Hyvärinen	Yamaha	44'45.160	
18	(France) Michael Galbit	Yamaha	44'48.520	
19	(Switzerland) Hans Müller	Yamaha	45'03.470	
20	(Venezuela) Paul Harris	Yamaha	45'20.460	
21	(Italy) Franco Marchegiani	Yamaha	45'20.930	
22	(Australia) Jeffrey Sayle	Armstrong	45'21.330	
23	(Austria) Thomas Bacher	Yamaha	45'22.990	
24	(Switzerland) Nedy Crotta	Yamaha	45'23.590	
25	(France) Jean-Michel Mattioli	Yamaha	45'24.180	
26	(Spain) Luis Miguel Reyes	Kobas	46'00.630	
27	(South Africa) Johnny Scott	Yamaha	46'33.530	
28	(Switzerland) Constant Pittet	Yamaha	+1 lap	

== 125cc classification ==
Pos.	Rider	Manufacturer	Time/Retired	Points
1	(Italy) Eugenio Lazzarini	Garelli	45'08.930	15
2	(Venezuela) Iván Palazzese	MBA	45'11.220	12
3	(Spain) Ricardo Tormo	Sanvenero	45'18.550	10
4	(Switzerland) Hans Müller	MBA	45'36.560	8
5	(Germany) Gerhard Waibel	MBA	46'06.660	6
6	(Austria) August Auinger	MBA	46'06.990	5
7	(Switzerland) Bruno Kneubühler	MBA	46'07.750	4
8	(Italy) Dominico Brigaglia	MBA	46'08.520	3
9	(France) Jean-Claude Selini	MBA	46'33.930	2
10	(Netherlands) Henk van Kessel	MBA	47'16.440	1
11	(Finland) Johnny Wickström	MBA	47'16.870	
12	(Austria) Erich Klein	MBA	47'18.840	
13	(Belgium) Olivier Liegeois	Sanvereno	47'19.150	
14	(Argentina) Willy Pérez	MBA	47'33.020	
15	(Czechoslovak Socialist Republic) Peter Balaz	MBA	48'23.210	
16	(Sweden) Jan Bäckström	MBA	49'01.600	
17	(Finland) Ilkka Jaakkola	MBA	49'01.980	
18	(Germany) Helmut Lichtenberg	MBA	49'03.130	
19	(Czechoslovak Socialist Republic) Zbynek Havdra	MBA	49'03.520	
20	(Switzerland) Peter Sommer	MBA	+1 lap	
21	(Italy) Carlo Succi	MBA	+1 lap	
22	(Sweden) Tore Alexandersson	MBA	+1 lap	
23	(France) Patrick Gross	Condor	+2 laps	

Previous race: 1982 Finnish Grand Prix	FIM Grand Prix World Championship; 1982 season	Next race: 1982 San Marino Grand Prix
Previous race: 1981 Czechoslovak Grand Prix	Czechoslovak Grand Prix	Next race: 1987 Czechoslovak Grand Prix
