= San Marino and Rimini Riviera motorcycle Grand Prix =

Motorcycle race held near San Marino in Italy

San Marino Grand Prix

Grand Prix motorcycle racing
- Venue: Misano World Circuit Marco Simoncelli (1985–1987, 2007–present); Mugello Circuit (1982, 1984, 1991, 1993); Imola Circuit (1981, 1983)
- First race: 1981
- Most wins (rider): Marc Márquez (9)
- Most wins (manufacturer): Honda (20)

The San Marino and Rimini Riviera motorcycle Grand Prix is a motorcycling event that is part of the FIM Grand Prix motorcycle racing season. The name of the race is a misnomer as the race has always taken place in Italy, but because there is already an Italian motorcycle Grand Prix, it was called the San Marino Grand Prix because of the track location's proximity to San Marino. The event is due to take place at the Misano World Circuit Marco Simoncelli until at least 2031.

== History ==
The inaugural San Marino Grand Prix was held in 1981 at the Autodromo Dino Ferrari, then moved to the Autodromo Internazionale del Mugello for the 1982 race. In 1983, they returned to the Autodromo Dino Ferrari and in 1984 they once again returned to the Autodromo Internazionale del Mugello. From the 1985 season onwards the venue hosting the San Marino round was the Circuito Internazionale Santa Monica.

The round was taken off the calendar in 1988 but got added back in 1991, this time on the Autodromo Internazionale del Mugello. The round was not present in 1992 due to Bernie Ecclestone and the IRTA meddling with the selected grands prix chosen (see the FIM–IRTA war for more information on that) but returned in the 1993 on the same venue as before.

After that, the San Marino round was taken off the calendar for the 1994 season and it would take 13 years before the San Marino race would return in the 2007 season, where it has stayed on the calendar ever since.

== Official names and sponsors ==
- 1981, 1991, 1993: Gran Premio di San Marino (no official sponsor)
- 1982, 1984–1986: Gran Premio San Marino (no official sponsor)
- 1983: Gran Premio S. Marino (no official sponsor)
- 1987: Grand Prix San Marino (no official sponsor)
- 2007–2009: Gran Premio Cinzano di San Marino e Della Riviera di Rimini
- 2010–2013: Gran Premio Aperol di San Marino e Riviera di Rimini
- 2014–2016: Gran Premio TIM di San Marino e della Riviera di Rimini
- 2017: Gran Premio Tribul Mastercard di San Marino e della Riviera di Rimini
- 2018–2019, 2021: Gran Premio Octo di San Marino e della Riviera di Rimini
- 2020: Gran Premio Lenovo di San Marino e della Riviera di Rimini
- 2022: Gran Premio Gryfyn di San Marino e della Riviera di Rimini
- 2023–2024: Gran Premio Red Bull di San Marino e della Riviera di Rimini
- 2025–present: Red Bull Grand Prix of San Marino and the Rimini Riviera

== Winners ==
=== Multiple winners (riders) ===
# Wins	Rider	Wins	
# Wins	Rider	Category	Years won
9	(Spain) Marc Márquez	MotoGP	2015, 2017, 2019, 2024, 2025, 2026
9	(Spain) Marc Márquez	Moto2	2011, 2012
9	(Spain) Marc Márquez	125cc	2010
4	(Spain) Jorge Lorenzo	MotoGP	2011, 2012, 2013
4	(Spain) Jorge Lorenzo	250cc	2007
3	(Italy) Valentino Rossi	MotoGP	2008, 2009, 2014
3	(Italy) Francesco Bagnaia	MotoGP	2021, 2022
3	(Italy) Francesco Bagnaia	Moto2	2018
2	(West Germany) Anton Mang	250cc	1981, 1982
2	(Spain) Ricardo Tormo	50cc	1981, 1983
2	(Italy) Maurizio Vitali	125cc	1983, 1984
2	(United States) Eddie Lawson	500cc	1985, 1986
2	(Italy) Fausto Gresini	125cc	1985, 1987
2	(Italy) Loris Reggiani	250cc	1987
2	(Italy) Loris Reggiani	125cc	1981
2	(United States) Randy Mamola	500cc	1984, 1987
2	(Spain) Álex Rins	Moto3	2013, 2014
2	(Spain) Dani Pedrosa	MotoGP	2010, 2016
2	(Italy) Dennis Foggia	Moto3	2021, 2022
2	(Italy) Mattia Casadei	MotoE	2023 Race 1, 2024 Race 1

=== Multiple winners (manufacturers) ===
# Wins	Manufacturer	Wins	
# Wins	Manufacturer	Category	Years won
20	(Japan) Honda	MotoGP	2010, 2015, 2016, 2017, 2019
20	(Japan) Honda	500cc	1982, 1984, 1993
20	(Japan) Honda	250cc	1991, 1993
20	(Japan) Honda	Moto3	2014, 2015, 2017, 2018, 2019, 2020, 2021, 2022, 2024
20	(Japan) Honda	125cc	1993
14	(Japan) Yamaha	MotoGP	2008, 2009, 2011, 2012, 2013, 2014, 2020
14	(Japan) Yamaha	500cc	1983, 1985, 1986, 1987, 1991
14	(Japan) Yamaha	250cc	1985, 1986
14	(Italy) Ducati	MotoGP	2007, 2018, 2021, 2022, 2023, 2024, 2025, 2026
14	(Italy) Ducati	MotoE	2023 Race 1, 2023 Race 2, 2024 Race 1, 2024 Race 2, 2025 Race 1, 2025 Race 2
11	(Germany) Kalex	Moto2	2013, 2014, 2015, 2016, 2017, 2018, 2019, 2020, 2021, 2023, 2026
8	(Italy) Aprilia	250cc	1987, 2007, 2008, 2009
8	(Italy) Aprilia	125cc	2007, 2008, 2009, 2011
5	(Austria) KTM	Moto3	2012, 2013, 2016, 2025, 2026
4	(Italy) Garelli	125cc	1985, 1987
4	(Italy) Garelli	50cc	1982, 1983
3	(Italy) MBA	125cc	1983, 1984, 1986
3	(Spain) Derbi	125cc	2010
3	(Spain) Derbi	80cc	1985, 1987
3	(Italy) Boscoscuro	Moto2	2022, 2024, 2025
2	(Japan) Kawasaki	250cc	1981, 1982
2	(West Germany) Real	250cc	1984
2	(West Germany) Real	80cc	1984
2	(Switzerland) Suter	Moto2	2011, 2012

=== By year ===
A pink background indicates an event that was not part of the Grand Prix motorcycle racing championship.

Year	Track	Moto3		Moto2		MotoGP		Report
Year	Track	Rider	Manufacturer	Rider	Manufacturer	Rider	Manufacturer	Report
2026	Misano	(Spain) Máximo Quiles	KTM	(Spain) Manuel González	Kalex	(Spain) Marc Márquez	Ducati	Report

Year	Track	MotoE				Moto3		Moto2		MotoGP		Report
Year	Track	Race 1		Race 2		Moto3		Moto2		MotoGP		Report
Year	Track	Rider	Manufacturer	Rider	Manufacturer	Rider	Manufacturer	Rider	Manufacturer	Rider	Manufacturer	Report
2025	Misano	(Italy) Alessandro Zaccone	Ducati	(Italy) Matteo Ferrari	Ducati	(Spain) José Antonio Rueda	KTM	(Italy) Celestino Vietti	Boscoscuro	(Spain) Marc Márquez	Ducati	Report
2024	Misano	(Italy) Mattia Casadei	Ducati	(Spain) Óscar Gutiérrez	Ducati	(Spain) Ángel Piqueras	Honda	(Japan) Ai Ogura	Boscoscuro	(Spain) Marc Márquez	Ducati	Report
2023	Misano	(Italy) Mattia Casadei	Ducati	(Italy) Nicholas Spinelli	Ducati	(Colombia) David Alonso	GasGas	(Spain) Pedro Acosta	Kalex	(Spain) Jorge Martín	Ducati	Report
2022	Misano	(Italy) Mattia Casadei	Energica	(Italy) Matteo Ferrari	Energica	(Italy) Dennis Foggia	Honda	(Spain) Alonso López	Boscoscuro	(Italy) Francesco Bagnaia	Ducati	Report
2021	Misano	(Spain) Jordi Torres	Energica	(Italy) Matteo Ferrari	Energica	(Italy) Dennis Foggia	Honda	(Spain) Raúl Fernández	Kalex	(Italy) Francesco Bagnaia	Ducati	Report
2020	Misano	(Italy) Matteo Ferrari	Energica	—N/a		(United Kingdom) John McPhee	Honda	(Italy) Luca Marini	Kalex	(Italy) Franco Morbidelli	Yamaha	Report
2019	Misano	(Italy) Matteo Ferrari	Energica	(Italy) Matteo Ferrari	Energica	(Japan) Tatsuki Suzuki	Honda	(Spain) Augusto Fernández	Kalex	(Spain) Marc Márquez	Honda	Report

Year	Track	Moto3		Moto2		MotoGP		Report
Year	Track	Rider	Manufacturer	Rider	Manufacturer	Rider	Manufacturer	Report
2018	Misano	(Italy) Lorenzo Dalla Porta	Honda	(Italy) Francesco Bagnaia	Kalex	(Italy) Andrea Dovizioso	Ducati	Report
2017	Misano	(Italy) Romano Fenati	Honda	(Switzerland) Thomas Lüthi	Kalex	(Spain) Marc Márquez	Honda	Report
2016	Misano	(South Africa) Brad Binder	KTM	(Italy) Lorenzo Baldassarri	Kalex	(Spain) Dani Pedrosa	Honda	Report
2015	Misano	(Italy) Enea Bastianini	Honda	(France) Johann Zarco	Kalex	(Spain) Marc Márquez	Honda	Report
2014	Misano	(Spain) Álex Rins	Honda	(Spain) Esteve Rabat	Kalex	(Italy) Valentino Rossi	Yamaha	Report
2013	Misano	(Spain) Álex Rins	KTM	(Spain) Pol Espargaró	Kalex	(Spain) Jorge Lorenzo	Yamaha	Report
2012	Misano	(Germany) Sandro Cortese	KTM	(Spain) Marc Márquez	Suter	(Spain) Jorge Lorenzo	Yamaha	Report
Year	Track	125cc		Moto2		MotoGP		Report
Year	Track	Rider	Manufacturer	Rider	Manufacturer	Rider	Manufacturer	Report
2011	Misano	(Spain) Nicolás Terol	Aprilia	(Spain) Marc Márquez	Suter	(Spain) Jorge Lorenzo	Yamaha	Report
2010	Misano	(Spain) Marc Márquez	Derbi	(Spain) Toni Elías	Moriwaki	(Spain) Dani Pedrosa	Honda	Report
Year	Track	125cc		250cc		MotoGP		Report
Year	Track	Rider	Manufacturer	Rider	Manufacturer	Rider	Manufacturer	Report
2009	Misano	(Spain) Julián Simón	Aprilia	(Spain) Héctor Barberá	Aprilia	(Italy) Valentino Rossi	Yamaha	Report
2008	Misano	(Hungary) Gábor Talmácsi	Aprilia	(Spain) Álvaro Bautista	Aprilia	(Italy) Valentino Rossi	Yamaha	Report
2007	Misano	(Italy) Mattia Pasini	Aprilia	(Spain) Jorge Lorenzo	Aprilia	(Australia) Casey Stoner	Ducati	Report
Year	Track	125cc		250cc		500cc		Report
Year	Track	Rider	Manufacturer	Rider	Manufacturer	Rider	Manufacturer	Report
1993	Mugello	(Germany) Dirk Raudies	Honda	(Italy) Loris Capirossi	Honda	(Australia) Mick Doohan	Honda	Report
1991	Mugello	(Germany) Peter Öttl	Rotax	(Italy) Luca Cadalora	Honda	(United States) Wayne Rainey	Yamaha	Report

Year	Track	80cc		125cc		250cc		500cc		Report
Year	Track	Rider	Manufacturer	Rider	Manufacturer	Rider	Manufacturer	Rider	Manufacturer	Report
1987	Misano	(Spain) Manuel Herreros	Derbi	(Italy) Fausto Gresini	Garelli	(Italy) Loris Reggiani	Aprilia-Rotax	(United States) Randy Mamola	Yamaha	Report
1986	Misano	(Italy) Pier Paolo Bianchi	Seel	(West Germany) August Auinger	MBA	(Japan) Tadahiko Taira	Yamaha	(United States) Eddie Lawson	Yamaha	Report
1985	Misano	(Spain) Jorge Martínez	Derbi	(Italy) Fausto Gresini	Garelli	(Venezuela) Carlos Lavado	Yamaha	(United States) Eddie Lawson	Yamaha	Report
1984	Mugello	(West Germany) Gerhard Waibel	Real	(Italy) Maurizio Vitali	MBA	(West Germany) Manfred Herweh	Real-Rotax	(United States) Randy Mamola	Honda	Report
Year	Track	50cc		125cc		250cc		500cc		Report
Year	Track	Rider	Manufacturer	Rider	Manufacturer	Rider	Manufacturer	Rider	Manufacturer	Report
1983	Imola	(Spain) Ricardo Tormo	Garelli	(Italy) Maurizio Vitali	MBA			(United States) Kenny Roberts	Yamaha	Report

Year	Track	50cc		125cc		250cc		350cc		500cc		Report
Year	Track	Rider	Manufacturer	Rider	Manufacturer	Rider	Manufacturer	Rider	Manufacturer	Rider	Manufacturer	Report
1982	Mugello	(Italy) Eugenio Lazzarini	Garelli			(West Germany) Anton Mang	Kawasaki			(United States) Freddie Spencer	Honda	Report
1981	Imola	(Spain) Ricardo Tormo	Bultaco	(Italy) Loris Reggiani	Minarelli	(West Germany) Anton Mang	Kawasaki			(Italy) Marco Lucchinelli	Suzuki	Report
