= 1981 Czechoslovak motorcycle Grand Prix =

(Czechoslovakia) 1981 Czechoslovak Grand Prix
Race details
- Race 14 of 14 races in the 1981 Grand Prix motorcycle racing season
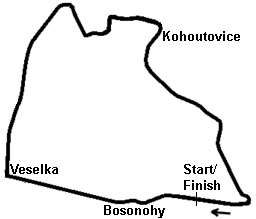
- Date: 30 August 1981
- Official name: Grand Prix ČSSR-Brno
- Location: Brno Circuit
- Course: Permanent racing facility; 5.403 km (3.357 mi)

500cc
Pole position
- Rider: No 500cc race was held
Podium
- First: No 500cc race was held
- Second: No 500cc race was held
- Third: No 500cc race was held

350cc
Pole position
- Rider: (West Germany) Anton Mang
Podium
- First: (West Germany) Anton Mang
- Second: (France) Jean-François Baldé
- Third: (West Germany) Gustav Reiner

250cc
Pole position
- Rider: (West Germany) Anton Mang
Podium
- First: (West Germany) Anton Mang
- Second: (Switzerland) Roland Freymond
- Third: (France) Jean-Louis Tournadre

125cc
Pole position
- Rider: No 125cc race was held
Podium
- First: No 125cc race was held
- Second: No 125cc race was held
- Third: No 125cc race was held

80cc
Pole position
- Rider: No 80cc race was held
Podium
- First: No 80cc race was held
- Second: No 80cc race was held
- Third: No 80cc race was held

50cc
Pole position
- Rider: (West Germany) Stefan Dörflinger
Podium
- First: (Netherlands) Theo Timmer
- Second: (Italy) Giuseppe Ascareggi
- Third: (West Germany) Reiner Kunz

The 1981 Czechoslovak motorcycle Grand Prix was the fourteenth and final round of the 1981 Grand Prix motorcycle racing season. It took place on the weekend of 28–30 August 1981 at the Masaryk Circuit in Brno, Czechoslovakia.

== 350cc classification ==
Pos.	Rider	Manufacturer	Time/Retired	Points
1	(Germany) Anton Mang	Kawasaki	48'42.770	15
2	(France) Jean-François Baldé	Kawasaki	50'06.720	12
3	(Germany) Gustav Reiner	Yamaha	50'06.720	10
4	(Switzerland) Wolfgang von Muralt	Yamaha	50'25.060	8
5	(Switzerland) Jacques Cornu	Yamaha	50'26.230	6
6	(Netherlands) Mar Schouten	Yamaha	50'26.830	5
7	(Finland) Reino Eskelinen	Yamaha	50'27.470	4
8	(Germany) Martin Wimmer	Yamaha	50'30.790	3
9	(Belgium) René Delaby	Yamaha	50'30.790	2
10	(Italy) Paolo Ferretti	Yamaha	50'33.970	1
11	(United Kingdom) Tony Head	Yamaha	50'44.390	
12	(Australia) Graeme Gedds	Yamaha	51'09.030	
13	(Italy) Attilio Riondato	Yamaha	52'09.030	
14	(Switzerland) Claude Berger	Yamaha	52'09.470	
15	(France) Roger Sibille	Yamaha	52'09.810	
16	(Austria) Franz Kaserer	Yamaha	52'17.870	
17	(Germany) Herbert Hauf	Yamaha	52'41.940	
18	(Netherlands) Rinus van Kasteren	Yamaha	53'06.390	
19	(Switzerland) Nedy Crotta	Yamaha	+1 lap	
20	(Hungary) Arpád Juhos	Yamaha	+1 lap	
Ret	(France) Patrick Fernandez	Yamaha	Retired	
Ret	(Belgium) Didier de Radiguès	Yamaha	Retired	
Ret	(Italy) Walter Villa	Yamaha	Retired	
Ret	(Switzerland) Edwin Weibel	Yamaha	Retired	
Ret	(Czechoslovak Socialist Republic) Bohumil Stasa	Yamaha	Retired	
Ret	(United Kingdom) Steve Williams	Yamaha	Retired	
Ret	(Austria) Siegfried Minich	Bartol	Retired	
Ret	(Germany) Walter Hoffmann	Yamaha	Retired	
Ret	(Finland) Eero Hyvärinen	Yamaha	Retired	
Ret	(France) Pierre Bolle	Yamaha	Retired	
Ret	(France) Frédérigue Duval	Yamaha	Retired	
Ret	(Switzerland) Bruno Kneubühler	Yamaha	Retired	
Ret	(Finland) Pekka Nurmi	Yamaha	Retired	
Ret	(Czechoslovak Socialist Republic) Peter Balaz	Yamaha	Retired	

== 250cc classification ==
Pos.	Rider	Manufacturer	Time/Retired	Points
1	(Germany) Anton Mang	Kawasaki	42'43.250	15
2	(Switzerland) Roland Freymond	Yamaha	43'09.490	12
3	(France) Jean-Louis Tournadre	Yamaha	43'12.600	10
4	(Belgium) Didier de Radiguès	Yamaha	43'13.150	8
5	(France) Roger Sibille	Yamaha	43'23.450	6
6	(Italy) Paolo Ferretti	Ad Majora	43'23.900	5
7	(France) Jean-Louis Guignabodet	Kawasaki	43'24.210	4
8	(Germany) Martin Wimmer	Yamaha	43'32.770	3
9	(France) Jean-François Baldé	Yamaha	43'33.160	2
10	(Austria) Siegfried Minich	Yamaha	43'55.430	1
11	(Switzerland) Bruno Kneubühler	Rotax	43'57.100	
12	(Italy) Franco Merchegiani	Yamaha	43'57.500	
13	(Switzerland) Jacques Cornu	Yamaha	44'12.560	
14	(France) Guy Batesti	Yamaha	44'15.160	
15	(France) André Gouin	Yamaha	44'21.110	
16	(Austria) Manfred Obinger	Yamaha	44'21.500	
17	(Germany) Karl-Thomas Grässel	Yamaha	44'22.190	
18	(France) Pierre Tocco	Yamaha	44'22.400	
19	(Italy) Walter Villa	Yamaha	44'43.740	
20	(Italy) Pier-Paolo Bianchi	Morbidelli	44'44.000	
21	(France) Jean-Jacques Peyre	Yamaha	44'55.490	
22	(Austria) August Auinger	Rotax	44'56.820	
23	(Germany) Gerhard Singer	Yamaha	45'23.810	
24	(Finland) Eero Hyvärinen	Yamaha	45'24.530	
25	(Australia) Graeme Geddes	Yamaha	45'40.090	
26	(Czechoslovak Socialist Republic) Bohumil Stasa	Yamaha	45'40.090	
27	(United Kingdom) Steve Williams	Yamaha	46'07.900	
28	(Czechoslovak Socialist Republic) Peter Balaz	Yamaha	46'10.120	
Ret	(France) Frédérigue Duval	Yamaha	Retired	
Ret	(United States) Richard Schlachter	Yamaha	Retired	
Ret	(France) Hervé Guilleux	Siroco	Retired	
Ret	(Belgium) Jean-Marc Toffolo	Armstrong	Retired	
Ret	(France) Patrick Fernandez	Yamaha	Retired	
Ret	(Finland) Pekka Nurmi	Yamaha	Retired	
Ret	(France) Alain Béraud	Yamaha	Fatal accident	
Ret	(France) Jacques Bolle	Yamaha	Retired	
Ret	(Italy) Loris Reggiani	Yamaha	Retired	
Ret	(Germany) Herbert Hauf	FKN	Retired	

== 50cc classification ==
Pos.	Rider	Manufacturer	Time/Retired	Points
1	(Netherlands) Theo Timmer	Bultaco	38'40.140	15
2	(Italy) Giuseppe Ascareggi	Minarelli	38'52.230	12
3	(Germany) Reiner Kunz	Kreidler	39'05.140	10
4	(Germany) Hagen Klein	Kreidler	39'06.700	8
5	(Austria) Hans-Jürgen Hummel	Sachs	39'19.190	6
6	(Switzerland) Rolf Blatter	Kreidler	39'38.020	5
7	(Italy) Claudio Lusuardi	Villa	40'11.490	4
8	(Netherlands) George Looijesteijn	Kreidler	40'24.910	3
9	(Germany) Günter Schirnhofer	Kreidler	40'29.730	2
10	(Germany) Kasimir Rapsczynski	Kreidler	40'30.110	1
11	(Germany) Reiner Scheidhauer	Kreidler	40'49.210	
12	(Netherlands) Jos van Dongen	Kreidler	40'49.530	
13	(France) Yves Dupont	Kreidler	40'50.750	
14	(Czechoslovak Socialist Republic) Zbynek Havdra	Kreidler	41'22.010	
15	(Germany) Klaus Kull	Kreidler	41'59.630	
16	(Switzerland) Reiner Koster	Kreidler	42'23.770	
17	(Belgium) Chris Baert	CVD	+1 lap	
18	(Czechoslovak Socialist Republic) Zbynek Havdra Jr.	Kreidler	+1 lap	
19	(Netherlands) Henk van Kessel	Kreidler	+1 lap	
20	(Finland) Mika-Sakari Kumo	Kreidler	+1 lap	
21	(Belgium) Dirk van deer Donckt	Kreidler	+1 lap	
22	(Czechoslovak Socialist Republic) Bedrich Fendrich	Juventa	+1 lap	
Ret	(Switzerland) Stefan Dörflinger	Kreidler	Retired	
Ret	(Austria) Otto Machinek	Kreidler	Retired	
Ret	(Czechoslovak Socialist Republic) Jiři Safránek	Kreidler	Retired	
Ret	(Germany) Gerhard Singer	Kreidler	Retired	
Ret	(France) Michel de Poligny	Kreidler	Retired	
Ret	(Spain) Ramon Galí	Kreidler	Retired	
Ret	(Switzerland) Joe Genoud	RYB	Retired	
Ret	(Germany) Thomas Engl	PCR	Retired	
Ret	(Netherlands) Hans Spaan	Kreidler	Retired	

Previous race: 1981 Swedish Grand Prix	FIM Grand Prix World Championship; 1981 season	Next race: 1982 Argentine Grand Prix
Previous race: 1980 Czechoslovak Grand Prix	Czechoslovak Grand Prix	Next race: 1982 Czechoslovak Grand Prix
