= Theo Timmer =

Dutch motorcycle racer

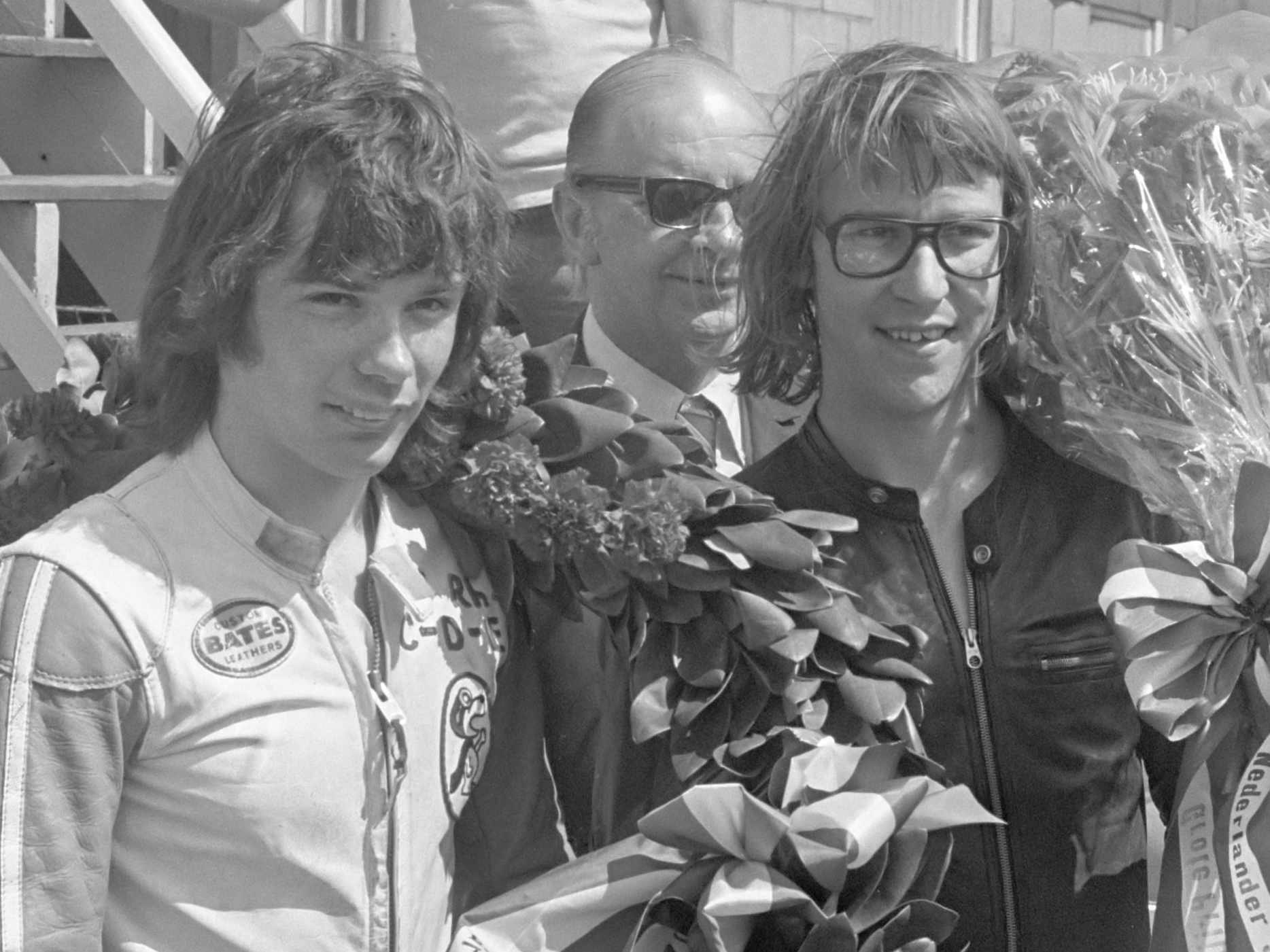
- Bruno Kneubühler and Theo Timmer (r.) (1973)
- Nationality: Dutch
- Born: 6 March 1949 (age 77); Amsterdam
Motorcycle racing career statistics
Grand Prix motorcycle racing
| Active years | 1972–1987 |
| First race | 1972 50cc Dutch TT |
| Last race | 1987 80cc Portuguese Grand Prix |
| First win | 1972 50cc East German Grand Prix |
| Last win | 1981 50cc Czechoslovak Grand Prix |
| Championships | 0 |
Starts / Wins / Podiums / Poles / F. laps / Points; 72 / 3 / 12 / 0 / 1 / 329

Theo Timmer (born 6 March 1949) is a former Grand Prix motorcycle road racer from the Netherlands. He had his best season in 1981, where he won the Czechoslovak Grand Prix and finished the season in second place, behind Ricardo Tormo. In 1972 and 1973, he was third in the championship. He built most of his own motorcycles. Jan Thiel and Martin Mijwaart were his teachers. The engine marks he used were Jamathi, Kreidler, Bultaco, Casal and Morbidelli. He was twice national champion.

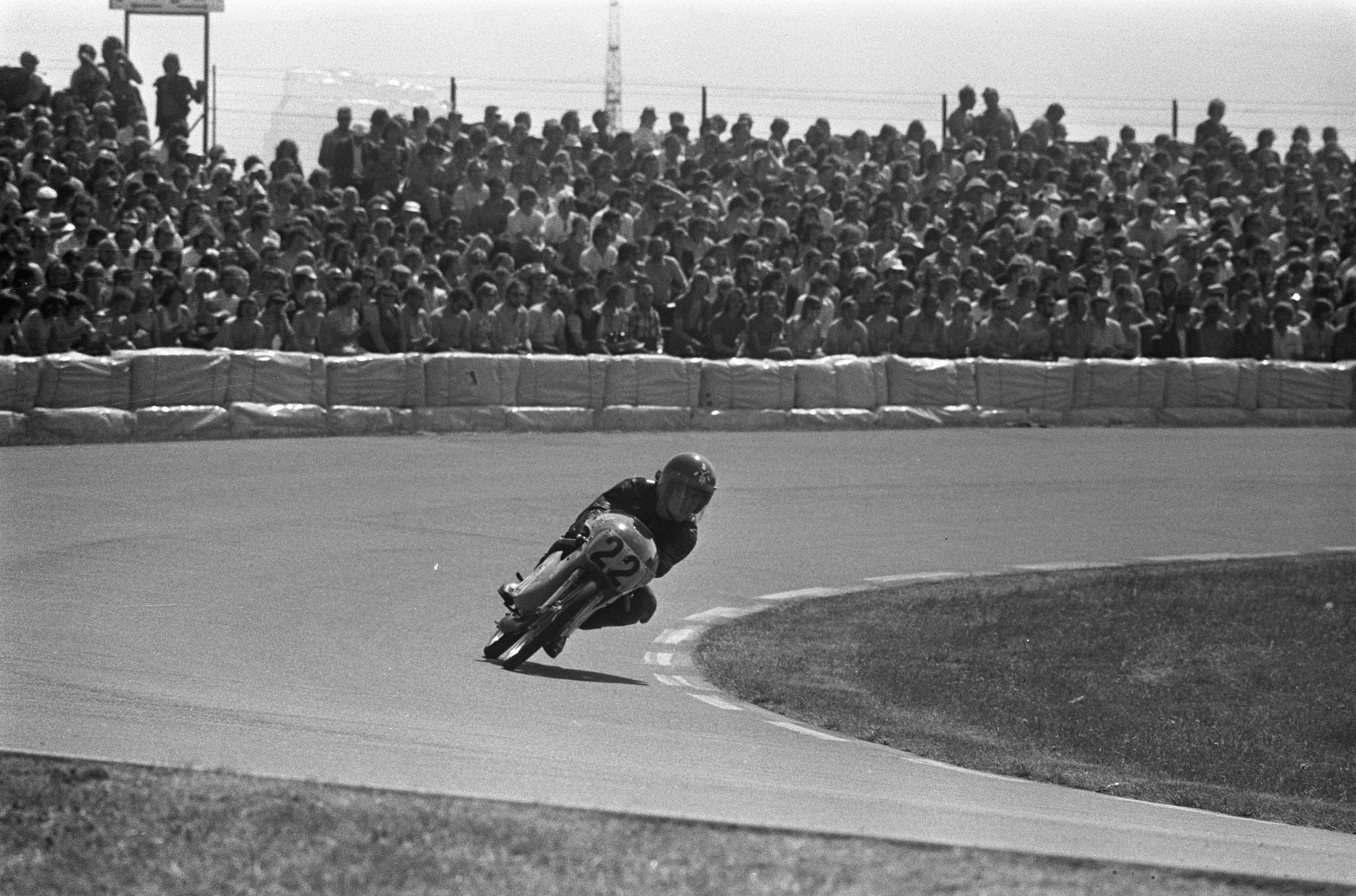
Timmer (22) in action during the 1973 50cc Dutch TT.

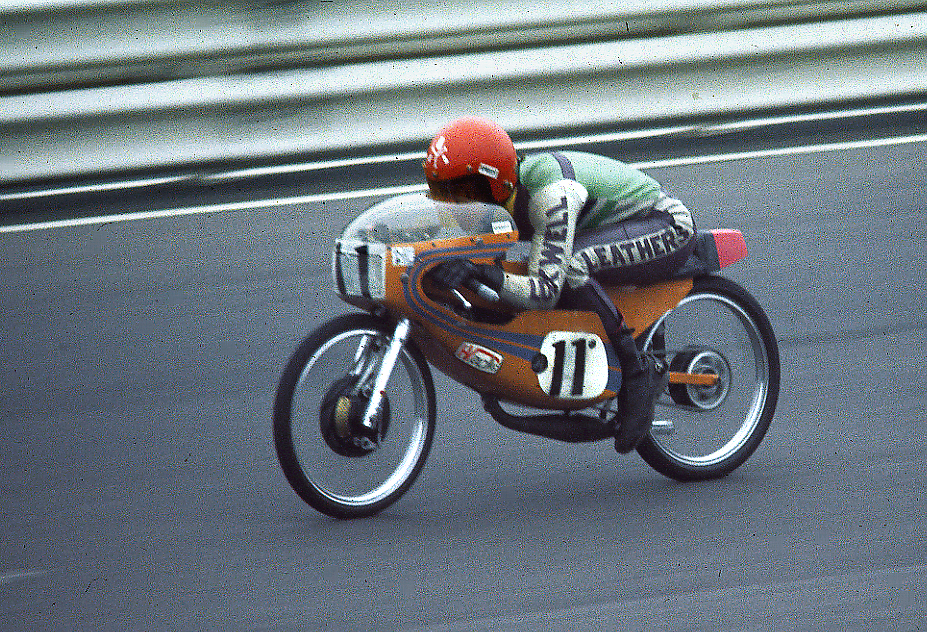
Theo Timmer at Nürburgring 1976
