= Condor SA =

Swiss bicycle and motorcycle manufacturer

Condor
- Company type: Private
- Industry: Bicycles, Motorcycles, Mechanical engineering
- Founded: 1891
- Founders: Victor Donzelot; Edouard Scheffer
- Headquarters: Courfaivre, Switzerland
- Products: Bicycles, motorcycles, automobiles, transport vehicles, machine tools

Condor SA was a Swiss manufacturer of bicycles, motorcycles, and mechanical engineering products based in Courfaivre. The company was founded in 1891 by Victor Donzelot and Edouard Scheffer, watchmakers from the Franche-Comté region of France.

== History ==
=== Early years and bicycle production ===
Condor was the first Swiss company to manufacture bicycles, beginning production in 1893 under the name Scheffer Frères & Cie, which became Condor in 1900. The company expanded into motorcycle production starting in 1901.

From 1904, the firm supplied bicycles to the Swiss Armed Forces and PTT (the Swiss postal service). Condor gained national recognition through sporting successes achieved by the brand, including its sponsorship of the Tour de Suisse from 1922 onward.

=== Diversification and growth ===
Over the course of the 20th century, Condor diversified its production to include automobiles, transport vehicles, machine tools, mechanical subcontracting, and the trade of Puch mopeds. The company also supplied motorcycles to the Swiss army from 1940 to 2000.

The workforce grew from 17 workers in 1900 to nearly 300 in 1950. However, the company faced difficulties during the economic crisis of the 1970s, with employment falling to 128 in 1975 due to economic downturn and technical unemployment, and further declining to 60 employees by 2000.

=== Late 20th century and decline ===
By the end of the 20th century, Condor's primary activity had shifted to mechanical subcontracting. After being acquired by several firms from 2005 onward, the company laid off a large portion of its workforce in 2010-2011.
