= 1982 San Marino motorcycle Grand Prix =

1982 San Marino Grand Prix
Race details
- Race 13 of 14 races in the 1982 Grand Prix motorcycle racing season
- Date: 5 September 1982
- Official name: Grand Prix San Marino
- Location: Autodromo Internazionale del Mugello
- Course: Permanent racing facility; 5.245 km (3.259 mi)

500cc
Pole position
- Rider: (United States) Freddie Spencer
- Time: 2:02.810
Fastest lap
- Rider: (Japan) Takazumi Katayama
- Time: 2:03.690
Podium
- First: (United States) Freddie Spencer
- Second: (United States) Randy Mamola
- Third: (New Zealand) Graeme Crosby

350cc
Pole position
- Rider: No 350cc race was held
Fastest lap
- Rider: No 350cc race was held
Podium
- First: No 350cc race was held
- Second: No 350cc race was held
- Third: No 350cc race was held

250cc
Pole position
- Rider: (Venezuela) Carlos Lavado
- Time: 2:08.690
Fastest lap
- Rider: (Venezuela) Carlos Lavado
Podium
- First: (West Germany) Anton Mang
- Second: (France) Jean-Louis Tournadre
- Third: (Switzerland) Roland Freymond

125cc
Pole position
- Rider: (Italy) Eugenio Lazzarini
- Time: 2:23.330
Fastest lap
- Rider: (Italy) Eugenio Lazzarini
Podium
- First: (Italy) Eugenio Lazzarini
- Second: (Switzerland) Stefan Dörflinger
- Third: (Italy) Giuseppe Ascareggi

50cc
Pole position
- Rider: No 50cc race was held
Fastest lap
- Rider: No 50cc race was held
Podium
- First: No 50cc race was held
- Second: No 50cc race was held
- Third: No 50cc race was held

The 1982 San Marino motorcycle Grand Prix was the thirteenth race of the 1982 Grand Prix motorcycle racing season. It took place on 3–5 September 1982 at the Mugello Circuit.

== Classification ==
=== 500 cc ===
Pos.	Rider	Team	Manufacturer	Time/Retired	Points
1	(United States) Freddie Spencer	Honda Racing Corporation	Honda	52'21.780	15
2	(United States) Randy Mamola	Team HB Suzuki	Suzuki	+17.700	12
3	(New Zealand) Graeme Crosby	Marlboro Team Agostini	Yamaha	+24.650	10
4	(Italy) Virginio Ferrari	Team HB Suzuki	Suzuki	+36.840	8
5	(Netherlands) Jack Middelburg	Ergon Suzuki Racing	Suzuki	+39.590	6
6	(Italy) Marco Lucchinelli	Honda International Racing	Honda	+50.540	5
7	(South Africa) Kork Ballington	Team Kawasaki	Kawasaki	+1'00.730	4
8	(Italy) Leandro Becheroni		Suzuki	+1'06.800	3
9	(Switzerland) Sergio Pellandini		Suzuki	+1'34.410	2
10	(Italy) Guido Paci	Team MDS Belgarda	Yamaha	+1'42.960	1
11	(Italy) Graziano Rossi	Marlboro Team Agostini	Yamaha	+1'43.130	
12	(Italy) Lorenzo Ghiselli		Suzuki	+1'59.760	
13	(Switzerland) Wolfgang von Muralt		Suzuki	+2'03.890	
14	(Switzerland) Andreas Hofmann		Suzuki	+2'04.090	
15	(Italy) Walter Migliorati		Suzuki	+1 lap	
16	(Switzerland) Peter Huber		Suzuki	+1 lap	
17	(Sweden) Peter Sjöström		Suzuki	+1 lap	
18	(West Germany) Reinhold Roth	Wolfgang Kucera	Suzuki	+1 lap	
19	(Italy) Pierluigi Rimoldi		Suzuki	+1 lap	
20	(Italy) Gianni Pelletier		Morbidelli	+1 lap	
Ret	(Italy) Franco Uncini	Gallina Team Suzuki	Suzuki	Retired	
Ret	(Finland) Seppo Rossi		Suzuki	Retired	
Ret	(Switzerland) Michel Frutschi	Moto Sanvenero	Sanvenero	Retired	
Ret	(France) Jean Lafond		Fior-Suzuki	Retired	
Ret	(Japan) Takazumi Katayama	Honda International Racing	Honda	Retired	
Ret	(Italy) Loris Reggiani	Gallina Team Suzuki	Suzuki	Retired	
Ret	(United Kingdom) Chris Guy	Sid Griffiths Racing	Suzuki	Retired	
Ret	(Italy) Fabio Biliotti		Suzuki	Retired	
Ret	(Spain) Víctor Palomo		Suzuki	Retired	
Ret	(South Africa) Jon Ekerold		Suzuki	Retired	
Ret	(Italy) Marco Papa		Suzuki	Retired	
Ret	(Italy) Maurizio Massimiani		Suzuki	Retired	
Ret	(Netherlands) Boet van Dulmen		Suzuki	Retired	
Ret	(Italy) Attilio Riondato		Yamaha	Retired	
Ret	(Italy) Raffaele Pasqual		Yamaha	Retired	
Ret	(Italy) Oliviero Cruciani		Suzuki	Retired	
DNS	(France) Marc Fontan	Team Sonauto Gauloises	Yamaha	Did not start	
DNS	(Italy) Edoardo Elias		Yamaha	Did not start	
DNQ	(Netherlands) Peter Looijesteijn	Dr Egel Banden	Suzuki	Did not qualify	
DNQ	(Norway) Bengt Slydal		Suzuki	Did not qualify	

Previous race: 1982 Czechoslovak Grand Prix	FIM Grand Prix World Championship; 1982 season	Next race: 1982 German Grand Prix
Previous race: 1981 San Marino Grand Prix	San Marino Grand Prix	Next race: 1983 San Marino Grand Prix
