= Anton Mang =

German motorcycle racer

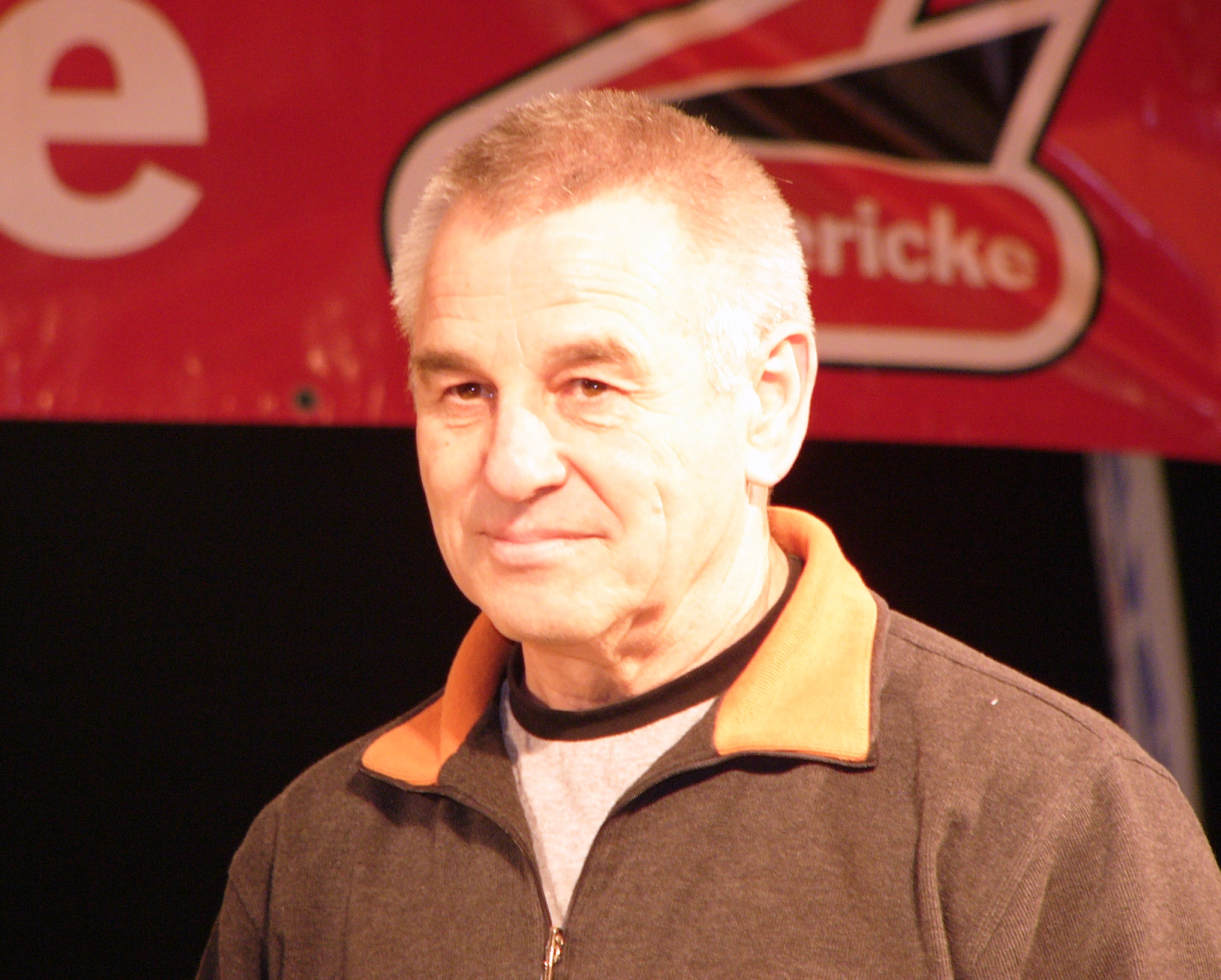
- Nationality: German
- Born: 29 September 1949 (age 77); Inning am Ammersee, West Germany
Motorcycle racing career statistics
Grand Prix motorcycle racing
Active years	1975 – 1988
First race	1975 350cc Austrian Grand Prix
Last race	1988 250cc Yugoslavian Grand Prix
First win	1976 125cc German Grand Prix
Last win	1988 250cc Japanese Grand Prix
Team(s)	Kawasaki, Honda
Championships	250cc – 1980, 1981, 1987 350cc – 1981, 1982
Starts / Wins / Podiums / Poles / F. laps / Points; 153 / 42 / 84 / 34 / 26 / 1,405

Anton "Toni" Mang (German pronunciation: [ˈtoːni ˈmaŋ]; born 29 September 1949) is German former motorcycle racer. He is a five-time world champion in Grand Prix motorcycle racing.

== Early life ==
When he was 11, Mang had his first experience with motorcycles on the DKW RT 125, but soon afterwards he chose skibobbing as his favoured sport. He was successful at this sport, winning the German National Championship as well as the Junior European Championship in skibobbing at the age of 16.

Still, motorsports kept pulling at Mang, and he took part in a 50cc race on a Kreidler two years later, though he had to pull out of the race due to mechanical difficulties.

== Professional racing ==
In 1970, Mang joined the reigning 125cc world champion Dieter Braun's team as his mechanic. Together with Sepp Schloegl and Alfons Zender Mang, he developed the "Schloegl Mang Zender" (SMZ 250). With this machine, he took part in a race on an airfield in Augsburg and claimed his first victory. In 1975 he won the German Championship on 350cc Yamaha. Also in 1975, he competed in his first Grand Prix at the Austrian round of the world championship.

Mang's first Grand Prix victory came at the 1976 125cc German Grand Prix at the 22.8 km Nordschleife Circuit at Nürburgring on a 125cc Morbidelli. His success earned him a ride with Kawasaki riding Kawasaki KR250 and KR350s for the 1978 season. In 1980, he became World Champion in the 250 cc class and runner-up in the 350cc class behind Jon Ekerold. In 1981, he won both the 250cc and 350cc World Championships and became German Sportsman of the Year. In 1982, he became the last ever 350cc World Champion as the class was abolished at the end of the year. He fell just one point short of defending his 250cc championship, despite winning five races.

In 1983, Mang moved up to the 500 cc class, but a bad injury sustained in a skiing accident at the start of the season preventing him from competing until the middle of August. He failed to finish above tenth place in any of the races. In the subsequent year, 1984, Mang returned to the 250 cc class and finished fifth in the World Championship on a private 250 cc Yamaha. In 1985, a strong performance by Freddie Spencer left him in second place in the championship. 1986 saw him finish in fourth place in the series. Moreover, the fruitful collaboration with his chief mechanic and friend Sepp Schloegl came to an end.

In 1987, Mang became 250cc World Champion for the third time with eight consecutive victories. At the age of 38, he was the oldest 250 cc World Champion in the history of Grand Prix motorcycle racing history. He started the 1988 season with a victory, but injuries sustained in a bad crash in the Rijeka race in Yugoslavia forced him into retirement. Mang retired with a lifetime total of 42 GP wins. The FIM named him a Grand Prix "Legend" in 2001.

Like Ángel Nieto on lighter 50cc and 125cc machinery, Mang specialized in medium-sized 250cc and 350cc bikes, winning all five of his championships on medium bikes.

== Motorcycle Grand Prix results ==
Points system from 1968 to 1987

**Position**	1	2	3	4	5	6	7	8	9	10
**Points**	15	12	10	8	6	5	4	3	2	1

Points system from 1988 to 1992

**Position**	1	2	3	4	5	6	7	8	9	10	11	12	13	14	15
**Points**	20	17	15	13	11	10	9	8	7	6	5	4	3	2	1

(key) (Races in bold indicate pole position; races in italics indicate fastest lap)

Year	Class	Team	1	2	3	4	5	6	7	8	9	10	11	12	13	14	15	Points	Rank	Wins
1975	350cc	SMZ	FRA -	ESP -	AUT; 6	GER -	NAT -	IOM -	NED -	FIN -	CZE -	YUG -						5	26th	0
1976	125cc	Morbidelli	FRA -	NAT -	NED; 6	BEL; 13	SWE -	FIN; 7	GER; 1	ESP; 4								32	5th	1
1977	125cc	Morbidelli	VEN; 2	AUT -	GER; 3	NAT; 4	ESP -	FRA -	YUG; 7	NED; 4	BEL; 3	SWE; 14	FIN -		GBR; 8			55	5th	0
1977	500cc	Suzuki	VEN -	AUT -	GER; 8	NAT; 10		FRA -		NED -	BEL -	SWE -	FIN -	TCH -	GBR -			4	25th	0
1978	250cc	Kawasaki	VEN; 7	ESP -		FRA -	NAT -	NED -	BEL; 7	SWE; 9	FIN; 4	GBR; 1	GER; 5	TCH; 10	YUG; 2			52	5th	1
1978	350cc	Kawasaki	VEN -		AUT -	FRA -	NAT -	NED -		SWE -	FIN -	GBR -	GER; 6	TCH; 7	YUG; 6			14	16th	0
1979	250cc	Kawasaki	VEN -		GER; 3	NAT -	ESP; 10	YUG; 6	NED; 4	BEL; DNS	SWE; 4	FIN -	GBR; 3	CZE; 4	FRA; 5			56	6th	0
1979	350cc	Kawasaki	VEN -	AUT; 3	GER; 2	NAT; 4	ESP -	YUG; 6	NED; 4			FIN; 4	GBR -	CZE; 2	FRA -			63	4th	0
1980	250cc	Kawasaki	**NAT**; 1	ESP; 2	**FRA**; 2	**YUG**; 1	**NED**; 3	**BEL**; 1	**FIN**; 2	**GBR**; 2	**CZE**; 1	**GER**; 3						128	**1st**	4
1980	350cc	Kawasaki	NAT -		FRA; 4		NED; 3			GBR; 1	CZE; 1	GER; 2						60	**2nd**	2
1981	250cc	Kawasaki	ARG; 14		**GER**; 1	**NAT**; 3	**FRA**; 1	**ESP**; 1		NED; 1	**BEL**; 1	**RSM**; 1	**GBR**; 1	**FIN**; 1	**SWE**; 1	**CZE**; 1		160	**1st**	10
1981	350cc	Kawasaki	ARG; 7	AUT; 2	GER; 1	NAT; 2			YUG; 1	NED; 1			GBR; 1			CZE; 1		103	**1st**	5
1982	250cc	Kawasaki			FRA -	ESP; 3	NAT; 1	NED; 1	**BEL**; 1	YUG -	GBR; 2	SWE; 2	FIN; 6	CZE; 8	RSM; 1	**GER**; 1		117	**2nd**	5
1982	350cc	Kawasaki	ARG -	AUT; 2	FRA -		NAT; 4	NED; 2			GBR; 3		FIN; 1	CZE; 2		GER; 2		81	**1st**	1
1983	500cc	Suzuki	RSA -	FRA -	NAT -	GER -	ESP -	AUT; NC	YUG -	NED -	BEL -	GBR; 12	SWE; 10	RSM; 10				2	18th	0
1984	250cc	Yamaha	RSA; 5	NAT; 10	ESP; 7	AUT; 2	GER; 4	FRA; 1	YUG; NC	NED; 4	BEL; 7	GBR; 11	SWE; DNF	RSM; 8				61	5th	1
1985	250cc	Honda	RSA; 2	ESP; 3	GER; 3	NAT; 5	AUT; 2	YUG; NC	NED; 3	BEL; 3	FRA; 2	GBR; 1	SWE; 1	RSM; 2				124	**2nd**	2
1986	250cc	Honda	ESP; 2	NAT; 1	GER; 2	AUT -	YUG; NC	NED; 2	BEL; 18	FRA -	GBR; NC	SWE; NC	RSM; 4					65	4th	1
1987	250cc	Honda	JPN; 8	ESP; NC	GER; 1	NAT; 1	**AUT**; 1	YUG; 7	NED; 1	FRA; NC	GBR; 1	SWE; 1	TCH; 1	RSM; 6	POR; 1	BRA; 7	ARG; NC	136	**1st**	8
1988	250cc	Honda	JPN; 1	USA; 8	ESP; NC	EXP; 7	NAT; 10	GER; 8	AUT; 10	NED; 3	BEL; 3	YUG; DNF	FRA -	GBR -	SWE -	TCH -	BRA -	87	8th	1

Awards
Preceded by (Germany) Guido Kratschmer	German Sportsman of the Year; 1981	Succeeded by (Germany) Michael Groß
