= 1982 German motorcycle Grand Prix =

(West Germany) 1982 German Grand Prix
Race details
- Race 14 of 14 races in the 1982 Grand Prix motorcycle racing season
- Date: 26 September 1982
- Official name: Großer Preis von Deutschland
- Location: Hockenheimring
- Course: Permanent racing facility; 6.789 km (4.218 mi)

500cc
Pole position
- Rider: (United States) Freddie Spencer
- Time: 2:09.910
Fastest lap
- Rider: (United States) Freddie Spencer
- Time: 2:09.160
Podium
- First: (United States) Randy Mamola
- Second: (Italy) Virginio Ferrari
- Third: (Italy) Loris Reggiani

350cc
Pole position
- Rider: (West Germany) Anton Mang
- Time: 2:17.490
Fastest lap
- Rider: (West Germany) Anton Mang
Podium
- First: (West Germany) Manfred Herweh
- Second: (West Germany) Anton Mang
- Third: (France) Éric Saul

250cc
Pole position
- Rider: (West Germany) Anton Mang
- Time: 2:20.240
Fastest lap
- Rider: (France) Thierry Espié
- Time: 2:19.930
Podium
- First: (West Germany) Anton Mang
- Second: (Italy) Paolo Ferretti
- Third: (France) Thierry Espié

125cc
Pole position
- Rider: No 125cc race was held
Fastest lap
- Rider: Unknown
Podium
- First: No 125cc race was held
- Second: No 125cc race was held
- Third: No 125cc race was held

50cc
Pole position
- Rider: (Switzerland) Stefan Dörflinger
- Time: 2:46.810
Fastest lap
- Rider: (Switzerland) Stefan Dörflinger
Podium
- First: (Italy) Eugenio Lazzarini
- Second: (Switzerland) Stefan Dörflinger
- Third: (Italy) Claudio Lusuardi

The 1982 German motorcycle Grand Prix was the last round of the 1982 Grand Prix motorcycle racing season. It took place on the weekend of 24–26 September 1982 at the Hockenheimring.

== Classification ==
=== 500 cc ===
Pos.	Rider	Team	Manufacturer	Time/Retired	Points
1	(United States) Randy Mamola	Team HB Suzuki	Suzuki	39'15.600	15
2	(Italy) Virginio Ferrari	Team HB Suzuki	Suzuki	+20.960	12
3	(Italy) Loris Reggiani	Gallina Team Suzuki	Suzuki	+21.730	10
4	(Japan) Takazumi Katayama	Honda International Racing	Honda	+42.960	8
5	(Italy) Marco Lucchinelli	Honda International Racing	Honda	+45.640	6
6	(France) Marc Fontan	Team Sonauto Gauloises	Yamaha	+58.310	5
7	(Netherlands) Boet van Dulmen		Suzuki	+58.630	4
8	(Switzerland) Sergio Pellandini		Suzuki	+1'14.510	3
9	(Switzerland) Philippe Coulon	Coulon Marlboro Tissot	Suzuki	+1'18.370	2
10	(South Africa) Jon Ekerold		Suzuki	+1'36.270	1
11	(Switzerland) Michel Frutschi	Moto Sanvenero	Sanvenero	+1'36.450	
12	(Italy) Guido Paci	Team MDS Belgarda	Yamaha	+2'00.740	
13	(Sweden) Peter Sjöström		Suzuki	+2'00.910	
14	(West Germany) Ernst Gschwender		Suzuki	+2'01.880	
15	(Italy) Walter Migliorati		Suzuki	+2'02.760	
16	(France) Philippe Robinet		Yamaha	+1 lap	
17	(France) Jean Lafond		Fior-Suzuki	+1 lap	
18	(West Germany) Alfons Amerschlager		Suzuki	+1 lap	
19	(United Kingdom) Steve Williams		Suzuki	+1 lap	
20	(Netherlands) Henk de Vries	Henk de Vries Motoren	Suzuki	+1 lap	
21	(West Germany) Josef Hage		Yamaha	+1 lap	
22	(Netherlands) Peter Looijesteijn	Dr Egel Banden	Suzuki	+1 lap	
23	(West Germany) Klaus Klein		Suzuki	+1 lap	
24	(Italy) Gianni Pelletier		Morbidelli	+1 lap	
25	(West Germany) Gerhard Treusch	Honda International Racing	Honda	+3 laps	
Ret	(Italy) Franco Uncini	Gallina Team Suzuki	Suzuki	Retired	
Ret	(United States) Freddie Spencer	Honda Racing Corporation	Honda	Retired	
Ret	(Finland) Seppo Rossi		Suzuki	Retired	
Ret	(West Germany) Gustav Reiner	Krauser MDS German Racing Team	Suzuki	Retired	
Ret	(United Kingdom) Steve Parrish	Team Mitsui Yamaha	Yamaha	Retired	
Ret	(France) Franck Gross		Suzuki	Retired	
Ret	(Switzerland) Andreas Hofmann		Suzuki	Retired	
Ret	(Spain) Víctor Palomo		Suzuki	Retired	
Ret	(Switzerland) Wolfgang von Muralt		Suzuki	Retired	
Ret	(Switzerland) Peter Huber		Suzuki	Retired	
Ret	(West Germany) Ulrich Lang		Suzuki	Retired	
Ret	(New Zealand) Stuart Avant	Guan Hoe Suzuki	Suzuki	Retired	
Ret	(Italy) Leandro Becheroni		Suzuki	Retired	
Ret	(New Zealand) Graeme Crosby	Marlboro Team Agostini	Yamaha	Retired	
Ret	(Netherlands) Jack Middelburg	Ergon Suzuki Racing	Suzuki	Retired	
Ret	(South Africa) Kork Ballington	Team Kawasaki	Kawasaki	Retired	

Previous race: 1982 San Marino Grand Prix	FIM Grand Prix World Championship; 1982 season	Next race: 1983 South African Grand Prix
Previous race: 1981 German Grand Prix	German Grand Prix	Next race: 1983 German Grand Prix
