= List of Grand Prix motorcycle racers: R =

Name	Seasons	World Championships	MotoGP Wins	500cc Wins	350cc Wins	Moto2 Wins	250cc Wins	Moto3 Wins	125cc Wins	80cc Wins	50cc Wins	MotoE Wins
(Spain) Andreas Rabadan	?	0	0	0	0	0	0	0	0	0	0	0
(Spain) José Luís Rabadan	1993	0	0	0	0	0	0	0	0	0	0	0
(Algeria) Aliouat Rabah	?	0	0	0	0	0	0	0	0	0	0	0
(Spain) Esteve Rabat	2005-2021, 2023	1 Moto2 - 2014	0	0	0	13	0	0	0	0	0	0
(Sweden) Morgan Radberg	1971	0	0	0	0	0	0	0	0	0	0	0
(South Africa) Mario Rademeyer	1983–1985	0	0	0	0	0	0	0	0	0	0	0
(Croatia) Alex Radman	?	0	0	0	0	0	0	0	0	0	0	0
(Belgium) Didier de Radigues	1980-1991	0	0	0	2	0	2	0	0	0	0	0
(United Kingdom) Bill Rae	1971–1973	0	0	0	0	0	0	0	0	0	0	0
(Switzerland) Damien Raemy	2009, 2011	0	0	0	0	0	0	0	0	0	0	0
(Belgium) Jack Raffeld	1951	0	0	0	0	0	0	0	0	0	0	0
(Switzerland) Jesko Raffin	2012, 2015-2020	0	0	0	0	0	0	0	0	0	0	0
(Austria) Josef Ragginger	?	0	0	0	0	0	0	0	0	0	0	0
(Indonesia) Yahas Rahmat	?	0	0	0	0	0	0	0	0	0	0	0
(United Kingdom) Jonathan Railton	?	0	0	0	0	0	0	0	0	0	0	0
(United States) Wayne Rainey	1984, 1988–1993	3; 500cc - 1990–1992	0	24	0	0	0	0	0	0	0	0
(India) Surya Raja	?	0	0	0	0	0	0	0	0	0	0	0
(India) Krishnan Rajini	?	0	0	0	0	0	0	0	0	0	0	0
(Netherlands) Teunis Ramaker	1970–1972	0	0	0	0	0	0	0	0	0	0	0
(France) Kévin Rambure	?	0	0	0	0	0	0	0	0	0	0	0
(Spain) Jose Ramon Ramirez	1996–1998	0	0	0	0	0	0	0	0	0	0	0
(Spain) Juan Ramirez	?	0	0	0	0	0	0	0	0	0	0	0
(Spain) Marcos Ramirez	2014, 2016-2025	0	0	0	0	0	0	2	0	0	0	0
(Austria) Leo Rammerstorfer	2026-	0	0	0	0	0	0	0	0	0	0	0
(Spain) Lluis Ramon	?	0	0	0	0	0	0	0	0	0	0	0
(Belgium) Paul Ramon	1986	0	0	0	0	0	0	0	0	0	0	0
(Spain) Vicente Ramon	?	0	0	0	0	0	0	0	0	0	0	0
(Venezuela) Gabriel Ramos	2014	0	0	0	0	0	0	0	0	0	0	0
(Spain) Jose Manuel Ramos	?	0	0	0	0	0	0	0	0	0	0	0
(Brazil) Renato Ramos	1997	0	0	0	0	0	0	0	0	0	0	0
(Spain) Román Ramos	2010, 2012-2014	0	0	0	0	0	0	0	0	0	0	0
(United Kingdom) Callum Ramsey	1995, 1997–2000	0	0	0	0	0	0	0	0	0	0	0
(South Africa) Gavin Ramsay	1992	0	0	0	0	0	0	0	0	0	0	0
(United Kingdom) Paul Randall	?	0	0	0	0	0	0	0	0	0	0	0
(Italy) Franco Randazzo	?	0	0	0	0	0	0	0	0	0	0	0
(United Kingdom) Barry Randle	1968, 1971–1974	0	0	0	0	0	0	0	0	0	0	0
(Italy) Giulio Rangheri	?	0	0	0	0	0	0	0	0	0	0	0
(Czech Republic) Norman Rank	2001, 2003	0	0	0	0	0	0	0	0	0	0	0
(Austria) Michael Ranseder	2004–2010	0	0	0	0	0	0	0	0	0	0	0
(Germany) Kasimir Rapczynski	1973	0	0	0	0	0	0	0	0	0	0	0
(France) Thierry Rapicault	1983–1985, 1987–1988	0	0	0	0	0	0	0	0	0	0	0
(United States) Steve Rapp	2012	0	0	0	0	0	0	0	0	0	0	0
(Malaysia) Shafiq Rasol	?	0	0	0	0	0	0	0	0	0	0	0
(Denmark) Kevin Rassmussen	?	0	0	0	0	0	0	0	0	0	0	0
(France) Christophe Rastel	2003	0	0	0	0	0	0	0	0	0	0	0
(Finland) Ari Raty	?	0	0	0	0	0	0	0	0	0	0	0
(Germany) Franz Rau	1977	0	0	0	0	0	0	0	0	0	0	0
(Germany) Dirk Raudies	1989–1997	1; 125cc - 1993	0	0	0	0	0	0	14	0	0	0
(France) Jean Phillipe Rault	?	0	0	0	0	0	0	0	0	0	0	0
(Italy) Marco Ravaioli	2008, 2010	0	0	0	0	0	0	0	0	0	0	0
(France) Christian Ravel	1969–1970	0	0	0	0	0	0	0	0	0	0	0
(France) Mathieu Ravier	?	0	0	0	0	0	0	0	0	0	0	0
(India) Deepak Ravikumar	?	0	0	0	0	0	0	0	0	0	0	0
(United Kingdom) Bradley Ray	2015	0	0	0	0	0	0	0	0	0	0	0
(United Kingdom) Kevin Raymond	?	0	0	0	0	0	0	0	0	0	0	0
(Czech Republic) Lukas Razek	2005	0	0	0	0	0	0	0	0	0	0	0
(Turkey) Toprak Razgatlıoğlu	2026-	0	0	0	0	0	0	0	0	0	0	0
(United Kingdom) Gino Rea	2012-2014	0	0	0	0	0	0	0	0	0	0	0
(United Kingdom) Jonathan Rea	2012	0	0	0	0	0	0	0	0	0	0	0
(United Kingdom) David Read	?	0	0	0	0	0	0	0	0	0	0	0
(United Kingdom) Phil Read	1961–1976	7; 500cc - 1973–1974; 250cc - 1964–1965, 1968, 1971; 125cc - 1968	0	11	4	0	27	0	10	0	0	0
(Germany) Norbert Redholz	?	0	0	0	0	0	0	0	0	0	0	0
(United States) Corey Rech	?	0	0	0	0	0	0	0	0	0	0	0
(United Kingdom) Scott Redding	2008-2018	0	0	0	0	3	0	0	1	0	0	0
(United Kingdom) Mark Reddington	?	0	0	0	0	0	0	0	0	0	0	0
(Rhodesia) Jim Redman	1959–1966	6; 350cc - 1962–1965; 250cc - 1962–1963	0	2	21	0	18	0	4	0	0	0
(United Kingdom) Edward Rees	?	0	0	0	0	0	0	0	0	0	0	0
(United Kingdom) George Reeve	1949	0	0	0	0	0	0	0	0	0	0	0
(United Kingdom) Tim Reeves	?	0	0	0	0	0	0	0	0	0	0	0
(United Kingdom) Tristan Reeves	?	0	0	0	0	0	0	0	0	0	0	0
(Italy) Loris Reggiani	1980–1995	0	0	0	0	0	5	0	3	0	0	0
(France) Thomas Regnier	?	0	0	0	0	0	0	0	0	0	0	0
(Germany) Kai Reibetanz	?	0	0	0	0	0	0	0	0	0	0	0
(Finland) Markus Reich	?	0	0	0	0	0	0	0	0	0	0	0
(Germany) Udo Reichmann	?	0	0	0	0	0	0	0	0	0	0	0
(Republic of Ireland) Andrew Reid	2010	0	0	0	0	0	0	0	0	0	0	0
(Australia) Ben Reid	1997	0	0	0	0	0	0	0	0	0	0	0
(Germany) Christian Reif	?	0	0	0	0	0	0	0	0	0	0	0
(Indonesia) Mohammad Reihan	?	0	0	0	0	0	0	0	0	0	0	0
(Germany) Gustav Reiner	1979–1988	0	0	0	0	0	0	0	0	0	0	0
(Germany) Neumair Reinhard	?	0	0	0	0	0	0	0	0	0	0	0
(Germany) Dirk Reissmann	1999–2000	0	0	0	0	0	0	0	0	0	0	0
(Hungary) Janos Reisz	1968–1971, 1973–1975	0	0	0	0	0	0	0	0	0	0	0
(Germany) Markus Reiterberger	2012	0	0	0	0	0	0	0	0	0	0	0
(Hungary) Fritz Reitmaier	?	0	0	0	0	0	0	0	0	0	0	0
(Portugal) Ivo Relmas	2007	0	0	0	0	0	0	0	0	0	0	0
(Slovenia) Jacob Remse	?	0	0	0	0	0	0	0	0	0	0	0
(Slovenia) Janez Remse	?	0	0	0	0	0	0	0	0	0	0	0
(France) Franck Renault	?	0	0	0	0	0	0	0	0	0	0	0
(Belgium) Rene Reiner	1979	0	0	0	0	0	0	0	0	0	0	0
(Australia) Martin Renfrey	?	0	0	0	0	0	0	0	0	0	0	0
(United States) Randy Renfrow	1988	0	0	0	0	0	0	0	0	0	0	0
(Netherlands) Ron Reniers	1993	0	0	0	0	0	0	0	0	0	0	0
(United Kingdom) Ralph Rensen	1960–1961	0	0	0	0	0	0	0	0	0	0	0
(Germany) Kevin Rentzsch	?	0	0	0	0	0	0	0	0	0	0	0
(Germany) Roland Rentzsch	1965, 1970	0	0	0	0	0	0	0	0	0	0	0
(Italy) Ronnei Repetti	?	0	0	0	0	0	0	0	0	0	0	0
(Hungary) Geza Repitz	1972–1974	0	0	0	0	0	0	0	0	0	0	0
(Finland) Anssi Resko	1961–1962, 1975	0	0	0	0	0	0	0	0	0	0	0
(Austria) Erich Reuberger	?	0	0	0	0	0	0	0	0	0	0	0
(Germany) Thomas Reuter	?	0	0	0	0	0	0	0	0	0	0	0
(Sweden) Johan Reuterholt	?	0	0	0	0	0	0	0	0	0	0	0
(France) Clément Revolte	?	0	0	0	0	0	0	0	0	0	0	0
(Spain) Luis Miguel Reyes	1983–1990	0	0	0	0	0	0	0	0	0	0	0
(Spain) Miguel Reyes	?	0	0	0	0	0	0	0	0	0	0	0
(United Kingdom) John Reynolds	1993–1994	0	0	0	0	0	0	0	0	0	0	0
(Spain) Xavi Riagua	?	0	0	0	0	0	0	0	0	0	0	0
(Spain) Pere Riba	1993, 1995, 2002	0	0	0	0	0	0	0	0	0	0	0
(Spain) Daniel Ribalta	1996, 1989	0	0	0	0	0	0	0	0	0	0	0
(Italy) Gianni Ribuffo	1973–1974	0	0	0	0	0	0	0	0	0	0	0
(Italy) Fausto Ricci	1984–1992, 1994	0	0	1	0	0	0	0	0	0	0	0
(Italy) Maurizio Ricci	?	0	0	0	0	0	0	0	0	0	0	0
(Australia) Ricky Rice	1990–1991	0	0	0	0	0	0	0	0	0	0	0
(United States) Ted Rich	?	0	0	0	0	0	0	0	0	0	0	0
(Australia) Glen Richards	1994–1995	0	0	0	0	0	0	0	0	0	0	0
(United Kingdom) Ian Richards	1969–1971, 1974, 1976	0	0	0	0	0	0	0	0	0	0	0
(France) Serge Richert	?	0	0	0	0	0	0	0	0	0	0	0
(Italy) Luigi Richetti	1974, 1976	0	0	0	0	0	0	0	0	0	0	0
(Austria) Ladi Richter	1960, 1963	0	0	0	0	0	0	0	0	0	0	0
(Germany) Reiner Richter	1972	0	0	0	0	0	0	0	0	0	0	0
(Germany) Rigo Richter	?	0	0	0	0	0	0	0	0	0	0	0
(Spain) Francisco Rico	1983	0	0	0	0	0	0	0	0	0	0	0
(Australia) Ben Ried	2004	0	0	0	0	0	0	0	0	0	0	0
(Germany) Toni Riedel	?	0	0	0	0	0	0	0	0	0	0	0
(Germany) Ernst Riederbauch	1955	0	0	0	0	0	0	0	0	0	0	0
(Germany) Daniel Ries	?	0	0	0	0	0	0	0	0	0	0	0
(Switzerland) Manuel Riesen	?	0	0	0	0	0	0	0	0	0	0	0
(Australia) Brent Rigoli	2004	0	0	0	0	0	0	0	0	0	0	0
(Australia) Michael Rigondeau	?	0	0	0	0	0	0	0	0	0	0	0
(Australia) Gerard Rike	1996–1997	0	0	0	0	0	0	0	0	0	0	0
(Netherlands) Paul Rimmelzwaan	1982–1985	0	0	0	0	0	0	0	0	0	0	0
(Italy) Michael Ruben Rinaldi	2012, 2014	0	0	0	0	0	0	0	0	0	0	0
(Italy) Luigi Rinaudo	1969–1973, 1978	0	0	0	0	0	0	0	0	0	0	0
(Austria) Ernie Ring	1952–1953	0	0	0	0	0	0	0	0	0	0	0
(United Kingdom) John Ringwood	1969	0	0	0	0	0	0	0	0	0	0	0
(Finland) Taru Rinne	1987–1990	0	0	0	0	0	0	0	0	0	0	0
(Spain) Álex Rins	2012-	0	6	0	0	4	0	8	0	0	0	0
(Argentina) Alfredo Rios	?	0	0	0	0	0	0	0	0	0	0	0
(Spain) Jesús Ríos	2026-	0	0	0	0	0	0	0	0	0	0	0
(Argentina) Matias Rios	1998–1999	0	0	0	0	0	0	0	0	0	0	0
(Netherlands) Eico Ripens	?	0	0	0	0	0	0	0	0	0	0	0
(Spain) Francisco Riquelme	1996	0	0	0	0	0	0	0	0	0	0	0
(Spain) Isaac Riquelme	?	0	0	0	0	0	0	0	0	0	0	0
(United States) James Rispoli	2012-2013	0	0	0	0	0	0	0	0	0	0	0
(Germany) Herbert Rittberger	1973–1977	0	0	0	0	0	0	0	0	0	4	0
(Germany) Hans-Joachim Ritter	?	0	0	0	0	0	0	0	0	0	0	0
(Germany) Marco-Jürgen Ritz	?	0	0	0	0	0	0	0	0	0	0	0
(Spain) Gerard Riu	2022	0	0	0	0	0	0	0	0	0	0	0
(Spain) Josep Rius	?	0	0	0	0	0	0	0	0	0	0	0
(France) Gilles Riva	1988	0	0	0	0	0	0	0	0	0	0	0
(Spain) Dani Rivas	2010, 2012–2013	0	0	0	0	0	0	0	0	0	0	0
(Spain) Benigno Rivera	?	0	0	0	0	0	0	0	0	0	0	0
(Hungary) Gabor Rizmayer	2001–2003, 2005	0	0	0	0	0	0	0	0	0	0	0
(United Kingdom) Tommy Robb	1957–1959, 1962–1971, 1973	0	0	0	1	0	1	0	1	0	0	0
(France) Lionel Robert	1987	0	0	0	0	0	0	0	0	0	0	0
(Canada) Adam Roberts	2009	0	0	0	0	0	0	0	0	0	0	0
(United States) Eddie Roberts	1975–1977	0	0	0	0	0	0	0	0	0	0	0
(United States) Joe Roberts	2017–	0	0	0	0	3	0	0	0	0	0	0
(United States) Kenny Roberts	1974, 1978–1983	3; 500cc - 1978–1980	0	22	0	0	2	0	0	0	0	0
(United States) Kenny Roberts Jr.	1993–2006	1; 500cc - 2000	0	8	0	0	0	0	0	0	0	0
(United States) Kurtis Roberts	1997, 2001, 2004–2005, 2007	0	0	0	0	0	0	0	0	0	0	0
(United Kingdom) Bill Robertson	?	0	0	0	0	0	0	0	0	0	0	0
(United Kingdom) Michael Robertson	?	0	0	0	0	0	0	0	0	0	0	0
(France) Philippe Robinet	1982, 1986	0	0	0	0	0	0	0	0	0	0	0
(Italy) Massimo Roccoli	2012, 2022, 2024	0	0	0	0	0	0	0	0	0	0	0
(France) Raymond Roche	1978, 1980, 1982–1988	0	0	0	0	0	0	0	0	0	0	0
(France) Christophe Rochel	1995	0	0	0	0	0	0	0	0	0	0	0
(Spain) Vincente Rocher	?	0	0	0	0	0	0	0	0	0	0	0
(United States) George Rockett	1964, 1967	0	0	0	0	0	0	0	0	0	0	0
(United States) Jimmy Rodger	?	0	0	0	0	0	0	0	0	0	0	0
(Germany) Guido Rodler	?	0	0	0	0	0	0	0	0	0	0	0
(Argentina) Gabriel Rodrigo	2014-2022	0	0	0	0	0	0	0	0	0	0	0
(Belgium) Dury Rodrigue	?	0	0	0	0	0	0	0	0	0	0	0
(Portugal) Edgar Rodrigues	?	0	0	0	0	0	0	0	0	0	0	0
(Spain) Ángel Rodríguez	2001–2006	0	0	0	0	0	0	0	0	0	0	0
(Spain) Aitor Rodríguez	2009	0	0	0	0	0	0	0	0	0	0	0
(Spain) Félix Rodríguez	1986, 1995	0	0	0	0	0	0	0	0	0	0	0
(Spain) Javier Rodríguez	1992, 1995	0	0	0	0	0	0	0	0	0	0	0
(Spain) Josep Rodríguez	2010–2012	0	0	0	0	0	0	0	0	0	0	0
(Spain) Laura Rodríguez	?	0	0	0	0	0	0	0	0	0	0	0
(Spain) Oscar Rodríguez	?	0	0	0	0	0	0	0	0	0	0	0
(Spain) Pedro Rodríguez	2010–2011	0	0	0	0	0	0	0	0	0	0	0
(Netherlands) Jan Roelofs	2004, 2006	0	0	0	0	0	0	0	0	0	0	0
(Malaysia) Hazifa Rofa	2014	0	0	0	0	0	0	0	0	0	0	0
(Italy) Roberto Rolfo	1996, 1998–2005, 2010, 2012, 2014	0	0	0	0	1	3	0	0	0	0	0
(Italy) Doriano Romboni	1989–1998	0	0	0	0	0	4	0	2	0	0	0
(Austria) Jakob Rosenthaler	2024-2025	0	0	0	0	0	0	0	0	0	0	0
(Malaysia) Ramdan Rosli	2014-2016	0	0	0	0	0	0	0	0	0	0	0
(Italy) Graziano Rossi	1978–1980	0	0	0	0	0	3	0	0	0	0	0
(Switzerland) Colin Rossi	?	0	0	0	0	0	0	0	0	0	0	0
(France) Louis Rossi	2007–2008, 2010-2015	0	0	0	0	0	0	1	0	0	0	0
(Italy) Riccardo Rossi	2019-2025	0	0	0	0	0	0	0	0	0	0	0
(Italy) Valentino Rossi	1996-2021	9 MotoGP - 2002–2005, 2008–2009; 500cc - 2001; 250cc - 1999; 125cc - 1997	76	13	0	0	14	0	12	0	0	0
(Australia) Jacob Roulstone	2024-2025	0	0	0	0	0	0	0	0	0	0	0
(France) Michel Rougerie	1972–1981	0	0	0	1	0	2	0	0	0	0	0
(Spain) Marcos Ruda	2023, 2025	0	0	0	0	0	0	0	0	0	0	0
(Spain) José Antonio Rueda	2021-	1 Moto3 - 2025	0	0	0	0	0	11	0	0	0	0
(Italy) Bruno Ruffo	1949–1952	3; 250cc - 1949, 1951; 125cc - 1950	0	0	0	0	3	0	1	0	0	0
(France) Jean-Philippe Ruggia	1987–1996, 1998	0	0	0	0	0	3	0	0	0	0	0
(Italy) Gabriele Ruiu	2019	0	0	0	0	0	0	0	0	0	0	0
(Spain) Yeray Ruiz	2022	0	0	0	0	0	0	0	0	0	0	0
(United Kingdom) Gordon Russell	?	0	0	0	0	0	0	0	0	0	0	0
(United Kingdom) Michael Russell	?	0	0	0	0	0	0	0	0	0	0	0
(United States) Scott Russell	1995–1996	0	0	0	0	0	0	0	0	0	0	0
(United Kingdom) Wayne Ryan	2013	0	0	0	0	0	0	0	0	0	0	0
(United Kingdom) Kyle Ryde	2013	0	0	0	0	0	0	0	0	0	0	0
