= Ernst Degner =

German motorcycle racer

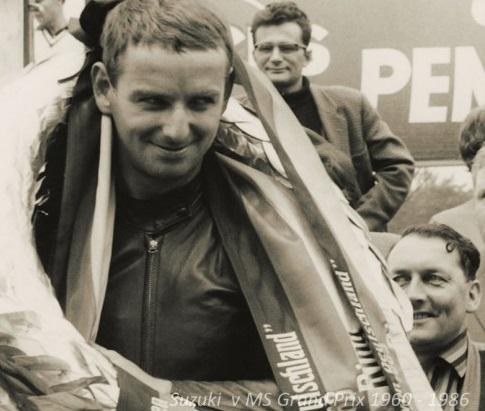
- Ernst Degner in 1963
- Nationality: German
Motorcycle racing career statistics
Grand Prix motorcycle racing
Active years	1956 - 1966
First race	1956 125cc German Grand Prix
Last race	1966 50cc "Ultra-Lightweight" Isle of Man TT
First win	1959 125cc Nations Grand Prix
Last win	1965 125cc Ulster Grand Prix
Team(s)	MZ, Suzuki
Championships	50cc - 1962
Starts / Wins / Podiums / Poles / F. laps / Points; 57 / 15 / 38 / N/A / 11 / 269

Ernst Degner (born Ernst Eugen Wotzlawek on 22 September 1931 in Gleiwitz, Upper Silesia, Germany - died 10 September 1983 in Arona, Tenerife, Spain) was a professional Grand Prix motorcycle road racer from Eastern Germany. He defected to the west in 1961, taking MZ's and his own tuning techniques to Suzuki, and winning Suzuki's first Grand Prix championship in 1962.

== Early life and early career ==
Degner's father died just before the end of World War II. Degner, his older sister and their mother fled from their home in Gleiwitz (now Gliwice, Poland) to avoid the advancing Red Army and wound up in Luckau, German Democratic Republic (East Germany) at the end of the war. Degner's mother died shortly thereafter. Degner attended Potsdam Technical High School and was awarded a diploma in development engineering in 1950. He became an apprentice motorcycle mechanic in Potsdam.

In 1950, Degner joined the Potsdam Motorcycle Club where he met Daniel Zimmermann, a designer and engineer who had built an exceptionally fast 125cc racing motorcycle based on the DKW RT 125. It was called the ZPH, reflecting the surnames of himself and his two riders at that time (Bernhard Petruschke and Diethart Henkel). The ZPH proved faster than the East German factory IFAs (later run under the brand MZ), whose machines were also based on the DKW RT 125. Degner started racing in 1952 and after a successful season, he obtained his licence to ride in the "Ausweisklasse" in 1953. The 1953 season saw Degner record his first victories at the Leipziger Stadtpark and Bernau meetings. He ended the season as runner-up in the 125cc Ausweisklasse (Junior) Championship. Zimmermann provided him with a ZPH engine which Degner used to finish second (after Horst Fugner) in the 1955 East German 125cc Championship.

== Racing with MZ ==
Degner's racing successes on the ZPH were noted by the MZ team manager Walter Kaaden, who signed him as an engineer/rider for the Zschopau factory, but only after Degner had secured employment for his girlfriend, Gerda Bastian, at the factory. Degner started his employment with MZ on 1 March 1956, and raced successfully for the East German manufacturer, which used two-stroke engines. After 1957, Kaaden had developed existing principles invented by DKW's Erich Wolff regarding how sound waves and expansion chambers affect engine tuning for the engines. In 1957, Degner won 11 out of 14 125cc races which he competed in for the factory, and finished the season as the 1957 East German 125cc road racing national champion. From 1958 on, the factory entered Degner in all world Championship races and he scored his first world championship victory at the 1959 125cc Nations Grand Prix at Monza. He ended the season ranked fifth in the 125cc world championship and fourth in the 250cc world championship. A fall that he took while practicing at the Isle of Man TT races, the opening round of the 1960 World Championship series, hindered his quest for the 125cc World Title, but his second Grand Prix victory at the Belgian Grand Prix meant that he finished third in the 125cc world championship.

== Defection ==
The Degner family's visits to attend races in the west forged friendships with Western riders and soon, the Degners saw for themselves the much improved lifestyles of their friends compared to their own. Furthermore, the Degners had no wish to bring up their children in the authoritarian state of East Germany, known for its repressive secret police and mass surveillance programs. These thoughts encouraged the Degner family to consider escaping to the west, as many East German professionals were already doing.

The Degner family decided to defect at the end of 1960. To continue his world championship ambitions, Degner needed a factory racing contract to replace his existing MZ contract. Degner's experience was exclusively with two-stroke racing engines, but there were few world-class manufacturers of two-stroke racing machines. Suzuki and Yamaha were two such 2-stroke manufacturers looking for GP success in 1961. After a disastrous GP debut at the 1960 Isle of Man TT, Suzuki were about to start their second GP year. Yamaha were also planning their GP debut in 1961. Degner was first contacted by the Suzuki team manager "Jimmy" Matsumiya in June 1961 at the Isle of Man TT races where MZ and Suzuki shared the same hotel. Just three weeks later (on 30 June 1961), Degner secretly signed a consulting contract with Suzuki at the Dutch TT races in Assen. Armed with a Suzuki racing contract, Degner now started planning his own, and his family's, escape to the west.

The initial plan was to cross from East Berlin into West Berlin and then fly to West Germany. The borders in Berlin allowed the free passage of East Germans into West Berlin where many then worked. But before such an escape could be implemented, the Berlin Wall was built in August 1961 and Berlin borders were tightly sealed. Degner then arranged for the escape of his family from the GDR in a car trunk on the weekend of 16-17 September 1961 while he was racing in the Swedish Grand Prix at Kristianstad. During the race, he could have secured the 125cc World Championship for himself and for MZ, but his engine failed early in the race. Ironically, his main rival for the 125cc World Title, Honda rider Tom Phillis, was unable to clinch the 125cc title at the race, as he finished sixth in the Swedish race, two laps behind the race winner. After the race, Degner drove not his own Wartburg car, but that of Matsumiya to Gedser, Denmark, where he caught the ferry to Holstein-Grossenbrode, West Germany. From there, he drove to Dillingen on the France/German border and met up with his wife and family, who had already safely defected to West Germany.

After the MZ team had discovered his defection, the East German State accused Degner of deliberately destroying his engine in the Swedish race, and the Allgemeiner Deutscher Motorsport Verband (ADMV, "General German Motorsport Federation") lodged a complaint with the FIM. The East Germans' accusations resulted in Degner's East German racing licence being revoked. Degner had, however, acquired a West German racing licence and with the help of Dr Joe Ehrlich, who owned EMC motorcycles, he was entered to ride a 125cc EMC at the next race of the championship in Argentina, where he could potentially salvage his world title. The ADMV advised the race organisers that Degner held no licence to race and the race organisers (who were paying the airfreight costs of getting motorcycles to Argentina) cabled the carriers of the EMC. This delayed Degner's EMC machine on its journey to Argentina to the point where Degner was prevented from racing this EMC 125cc racer in the final 125cc World Championship round in Argentina. Phillis won the race and the World Title. Had Degner won that race, he would have been crowned 125cc World Champion. At an FIM court in Geneva, Switzerland, on 25 and 26 November 1961, the court dismissed the charge by MZ that Degner had deliberately wrecked the engine of his MZ at the 1961 Swedish Grand Prix.

== Racing with Suzuki ==
In November 1961, Japanese company Suzuki hired him to fulfill his contract, which was to be paid about $25000.00 if he would obtain at least 24 HP from the new 125cc Suzuki engine, which had already been built as well as a new 50cc engine. He moved to Hamamatsu, Japan to work in the Suzuki race shop over the winter. Using the specialized two-stroke loop scavenge knowledge he had gained and perfected for himself at MZ, Degner improved Suzuki's new 50cc and 125cc racers. By 14 October 1962, Degner had won Suzuki's first World Championship in the 50 cc class.

On 3 November 1962 at Suzuka's inaugural race meeting, Degner crashed when a gust of wind lifted the front wheel of his Suzuki 50cc racer as he rounded Turn 8. To mark Suzuka's first-ever crash, Turn 8, where Degner had crashed, was named Degner Curve.

The crash was witnessed and later reported by Suzuki Japan's racing Hiroyuki Nakano as follows:

In November (1962), the All Japan Championship Race was held at the completed Suzuka Circuit, where Degner raced alone in the lead of the 50cc race and showed great pace, but he fell and retired. The curve he fell at was named the 'Degner curve'.

At the Japanese Grand Prix of 10 November 1963, after a bad start, Degner was last off the grid and crashed his Suzuki 250cc racer on his first lap at the exit to Turn 2 of the Suzuka Circuit. His Suzuki fuel tank was full and burst into flames, enveloping the rider. In his autobiography, Degner's Suzuki teammate Hugh Anderson stated:

As we came out of the first corner on the start of the second lap, we were confronted with frantically waved yellow flags and a great cloud of smoke and flames. Ernst had crashed heavily and was lying unconscious. Frank [Perris] had stopped and marshals, after dragging Ernst from the flames, were busy with their fire extinguishers trying to control the inferno fuelled by 25 litres of petrol. The race carried on.

Degner's burns required over fifty skin grafts and he was unable to return to race in the Suzuki team until September 1964. Later that year, he won the 125cc Japanese Grand Prix. He won three more Grands Prix in 1965 before retiring from motorcycle racing at the end of the 1966 season.

== Later years and death ==
After dabbling with single-seater car racing, Degner worked for a spell as technical manager at Suzuki's German importer in Munich. He then moved to Tenerife, where he ran a car hire business. He died in 1983. He had become dependent on medications after his crash in Japan, and his death may have been due to an overdose. Rumors persisted for years that he had committed suicide or was murdered by the East German Stasi to avenge his defection.

== Motorcycle Grand Prix results ==
Position	1	2	3	4	5	6
Points	8	6	4	3	2	1

(key) (Races in italics indicate fastest lap)

Year	Class	Team	1	2	3	4	5	6	7	8	9	10	11	12	13	Points	Rank	Wins
1956	125cc	MZ	IOM -	NED -	BEL -	GER; 0	ULS -	NAT -								0	—	0
1957	125cc	MZ	GER; 6	IOM -	NED -	BEL -	ULS -	NAT -								1	13th	0
1958	125cc	MZ	IOM; 5	NED; 6	BEL -	GER; 3	SWE; 5	ULS -	NAT -							9	7th	0
1958	250cc	MZ	IOM -	NED -		GER -	SWE -	ULS; 4	NAT -							3	14th	0
1959	125cc	MZ	IOM; NC	GER; 6	NED -	BEL -	SWE -	ULS; 3	NAT; 1							13	5th	1
1959	250cc	MZ	IOM; NC	GER -	NED; 6	BEL -	SWE; 4	ULS; 3	NAT; 2							14	4th	0
1960	125cc	MZ	IOM -	NED; 5	BEL; 1		ULS; 3	NAT; 3								16	3rd	1
1960	250cc	MZ	IOM -	NED; 6	BEL -	GER -	ULS -	NAT; 3								5	8th	0
1961	125cc	MZ	ESP; 2	GER; 1	FRA; 2	IOM; NC	NED -	BEL; 4	DDR; 1	ULS; 2	NAT; 1	SWE -	ARG -			42	2nd	3
1961	250cc	MZ	ESP -	GER; 4	FRA -	IOM -	NED -	BEL -	DDR -	ULS -	NAT -	SWE -	ARG -			3	13th	0
1962	50cc	Suzuki	ESP -	FRA -	IOM; 1	NED; 1	BEL; 1	GER; 1		DDR -	NAT -	FIN; 4	ARG; 2			47	1st	4
1962	125 cc	Suzuki	ESP -	FRA; 5	IOM; 8	NED; 4	BEL -	GER -	ULS -	DDR -	NAT -	FIN -	ARG -			5	11th	0
1963	50cc	Suzuki	ESP -	GER; 3	FRA; 2	IOM; NC	NED; 1	BEL; 2					ARG; 2	JPN -		30	3rd	1
1963	125cc	Suzuki	ESP -	GER; 1	FRA; 6	IOM; 3	NED -	BEL; NC	ULS -	DDR -	FIN -	NAT -	ARG -	JPN; 3		17	6th	1
1964	125cc	Suzuki	USA -	ESP -	FRA -	IOM -	NED -	GER -	DDR -	ULS -	FIN -	NAT; 3	JPN; 1			12	6th	1
1965	50cc	Suzuki	USA; 1	GER -	ESP -	FRA; 3	IOM; 3	NED; 5	BEL; 1						JPN -	26	4th	2
1965	125cc	Suzuki	USA; 2	GER; 4	ESP -	FRA; 2	IOM; 8	NED -		DDR -	CZE -	ULS; 1	FIN -	NAT -	JPN -	23	4th	1
1966	50cc	Suzuki	ESP -	GER -	NED -	IOM; 4	NAT -	JPN -								3	6th	0
