= Paddy Driver =

South African racing driver (born 1934)

- Nationality: South African
- Born: 13 May 1934 (age 92); Johannesburg, South Africa
Motorcycle racing career statistics
Grand Prix motorcycle racing
Active years	1958–1965
First race	1958 350cc Isle of Man TT
Last race	1965 500cc Finnish Grand Prix
Team	Norton
Championships	0
Starts / Wins / Podiums / Poles / F. laps / Points; 33 / 0 / 9 / N/A / 1

Paddy Driver
Formula One World Championship career
- Active years: 1963, 1974
- Team: Lotus private
- Entries: 2 (1 start)
- Championships: 0
- Wins: 0
- Podiums: 0
- Career points: 0
- Pole positions: 0
- Fastest laps: 0
- First entry: 1963 South African Grand Prix
- Last entry: 1974 South African Grand Prix

Ernest Gould "Paddy" Driver (born 13 May 1934) is a South African former professional Grand Prix motorcycle road racer and a racing driver.

== Motorsports career ==
Driver competed on the Grand Prix motorcycle racing circuit from 1959 to 1965. His best result was in 1965 when he rode a Matchless to a third-place finish in the 500cc world championship behind Mike Hailwood and Giacomo Agostini.

Driver participated in two World Championship Formula One Grands Prix, scoring no championship points. Driver was a regular competitor in the South African Formula One championship for many years, starting with the 1963 Rand Grand Prix, but only graduated full-time in 1969, driving a Formula 5000 Lola for Doug Serrurier. From 1971, he entered his own McLaren under the guise of Team Personality, finishing third in the series final classification. In 1974, he was hired by Team Gunston, racing a Formula One Lotus 72, and repeating his third place.

Driver is one of a small group of people who have raced in both the Grand Prix motorcycle World Championship and Formula One. The group also includes John Surtees, Mike Hailwood and Johnny Cecotto.

== Grand Prix motorcycle racing results ==
Position	1	2	3	4	5	6
Points	8	6	4	3	2	1

(key) (Races in italics indicate fastest lap)

Year	Class	Team	1	2	3	4	5	6	7	8	9	10	11	Points	Rank	Wins
1958	350cc	Norton	IOM; 11	NED	BEL	GER	SWE	ULS	NAT					0	–	0
1958	500cc	Norton	IOM; NC	NED	BEL	GER	SWE	ULS	NAT					0	–	0
1959	350cc	Norton	FRA; 5	IOM; NC	GER	NED	BEL	SWE	ULS	NAT; 5				4	12th	0
1959	500cc	Norton	FRA; 6	IOM; 6	GER	NED	BEL	SWE	ULS	NAT; 6				3	13th	0
1960	350cc	Norton	FRA; 5	IOM; 14	NED; 5	BEL		ULS; 6	NAT; 8					5	9th	0
1960	500cc	Norton	FRA; 4	IOM; 9	NED; 4	BEL	GER; 7	ULS	NAT; 4					9	7th	0
1961	250cc	Suzuki	ESP	GER	FRA	IOM; NC	NED	BEL	DDR	ULS	NAT	SWE	ARG	0	–	0
1961	350cc	Norton		GER		IOM; 10	NED		DDR	ULS	NAT	SWE		0	–	0
1961	500cc	Norton		GER	FRA	IOM; NC	NED	BEL; 6	DDR	ULS	NAT; 3	SWE	ARG	5	10th	0
1962	125cc	EMC	ESP	FRA	IOM; NC	NED	BEL; 3	GER	ULS; 6	DDR	NAT; 6	FIN	ARG	6	10th	0
1962	500cc	Norton			IOM	NED	BEL; 4		ULS	DDR; 5	NAT; 5	FIN	ARG	7	9th	0
1963	350cc	AJS	GER	IOM; 9	NED	BEL	ULS	DDR	FIN	NAT		JPN		0	–	0
1963	500cc	Matchless		IOM; 7	NED	BEL	ULS	DDR	FIN	NAT	ARG			0	–	0
1964	350cc	AJS		IOM; 9	NED; 4		GER; 5	DDR	ULS	FIN	NAT	JPN		5	7th	0
1964	500cc	Matchless	USA; 5	IOM; 26	NED; 3	BEL; 3	GER	DDR; 3	ULS	FIN; 5	NAT	JPN		16	5th	0
1965	350cc	AJS	GER; 6	IOM; NC	NED		DDR	CZE	ULS	FIN	NAT	JPN		1	24th	0
1965	500cc	Matchless	GER	IOM; NC	NED; 3	BEL; 4	DDR; 3	CZE; 4	ULS; 2	FIN; 2	NAT	JPN		26	3rd	0

== Complete Formula One World Championship results ==
(key)

Year	Entrant	Chassis	Engine	1	2	3	4	5	6	7	8	9	10	11	12	13	14	15	WDC	Points
1963	Selby Auto Spares	Lotus 24	BRM V8	MON	BEL	NED	FRA	GBR	GER	ITA	USA	MEX	RSA; DNS						NC	0
1974	Team Gunston	Lotus 72E	Cosworth V8	ARG	BRA	RSA; Ret	ESP	BEL	MON	SWE	NED	FRA	GBR	GER	AUT	ITA	CAN	USA	NC	0
