= Rudi Thalhammer =

Austrian motorcycle racer

- Nationality: (Austria) Austrian
- Born: February 1, 1935 (age 91); Austria
Motorcycle racing career statistics
Grand Prix motorcycle racing
Active years	1959, 1961
First race	1959 Isle of Man 250cc Lightweight TT
Last race	1961 350cc Swedish Grand Prix
Starts / Wins / Podiums / Poles / F. laps / Points; 3 / 0 / 1 / N/A / N/A / 8

Rudolf Thalhammer (born February 1, 1935) was a former Grand Prix motorcycle road racer from Austria. His best year was in 1961 when he finished sixth in the 350cc world championship. He was a three-time Austrian national champion.
