= Naomi Taniguchi =

Japanese motorcycle racer

- Nationality: Japanese
Motorcycle racing career statistics
Grand Prix motorcycle racing
Active years	1959 - 1961, 1963 - 1965
First race	1959 Isle of Man 125cc Ultra-Lightweight TT
Last race	1965 50cc Japanese Grand Prix
Team	Honda
Starts / Wins / Podiums / Poles / F. laps / Points; 10 / 0 / 0 / N/A / 0 / 8

Naomi Taniguchi (谷口 尚己, Taniguchi Naomi) is a former Grand Prix motorcycle road racer from Japan. In 1959, Taniguchi became the first Japanese racer to compete at the world championship level when Honda entered him in the Isle of Man TT. His most successful season was in 1960 when he finished in tenth place in the 125cc world championship.

== Motorcycle Grand Prix results ==
Position	1	2	3	4	5	6
Points	8	6	4	3	2	1

(key) (Races in italics indicate fastest lap)

Year	Class	Team	1	2	3	4	5	6	7	8	9	10	11	Points	Rank	Wins
1959	125cc	Honda	IOM; 6	GER –	NED –	BEL –	SWE –	ULS –	NAT –					1	14th	0
1960	125cc	Honda	IOM; 6	NED –	BEL –		ULS –	NAT –						1	10th	0
1960	250cc	Honda	IOM; 6	NED –	BEL –	GER –	ULS –	NAT –						1	17th	0
1961	125cc	Honda	ESP –	GER –	FRA –	IOM; 8	NED –	BEL; 7	DDR –	ULS –	NAT –	SWE –	ARG; 5	2	15th	0
1961	250cc	Honda	ESP –	GER –	FRA –	IOM; 5	NED –	BEL –	DDR –	ULS –	NAT –	SWE –	ARG –	2	16th	0
1963	50cc	Honda	ESP –	GER –	FRA –	IOM –	NED –	BEL –	FIN –	ARG –	JPN; 9			0	–	0
1964	50cc	Honda	USA –	ESP –	FRA –	IOM; 6	NED –	BEL –	GER –	FIN –	JPN –			1	13th	0
1965	50cc	Honda	USA –	GER –	ESP –	FRA –	IOM –	NED –	BEL –	JPN; 8				0	–	0
