= Gary Hocking =

Welsh-born Rhodesian motorcycle racer and racing driver (1937–1962)

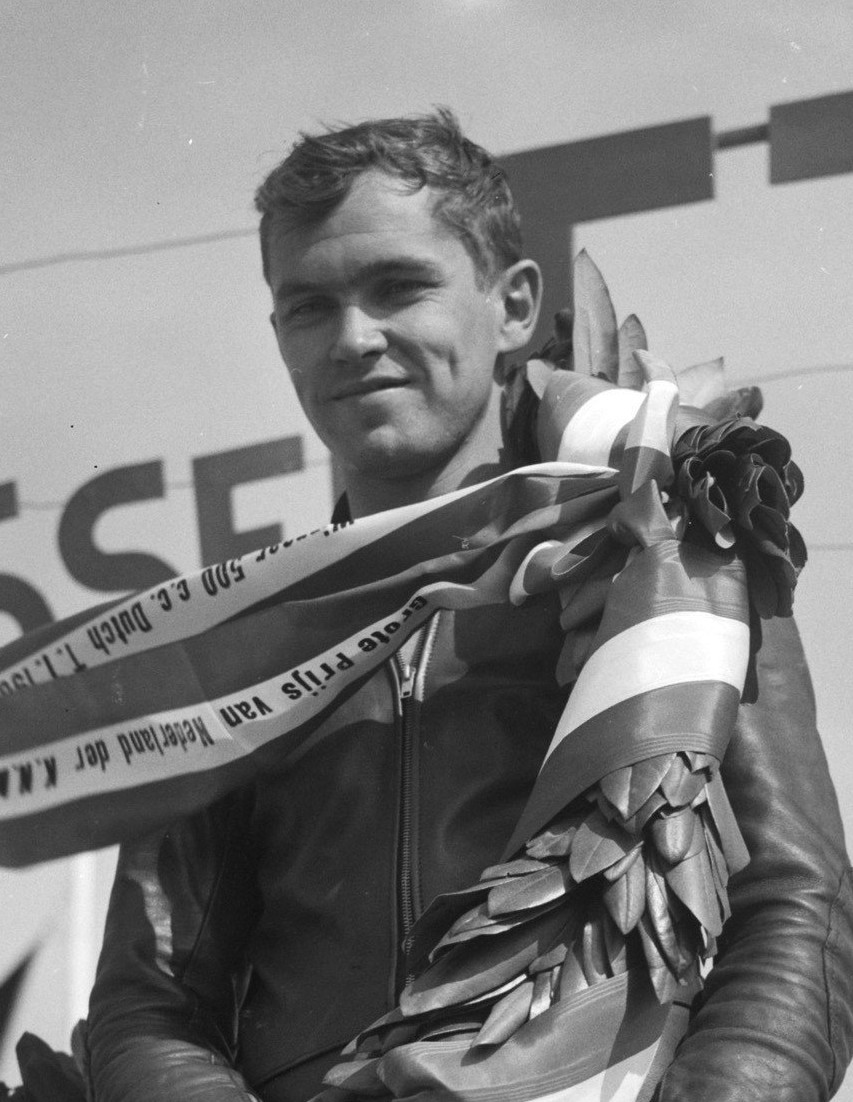
- Hocking after winning the Dutch TT in 1961
- Born: 30 September 1937; Caerleon, Wales, United Kingdom
- Died: 21 December 1962 (aged 25); Durban, South Africa
Motorcycle racing career statistics
Grand Prix motorcycle racing
Active years	1958 – 1962
First race	1958 500cc Dutch TT
Last race	1962 Isle of Man 500cc Senior TT
First win	1959 250cc Swedish Grand Prix
Last win	1962 Isle of Man 500cc Senior TT
Team(s)	MZ, MV Agusta
Championships	350cc – 1961 500cc – 1961
Starts / Wins / Podiums / Poles / F. laps / Points; 38 / 19 / 33 / N/A / 21 / 213

Formula One World Championship career
- Active years: 1962
- Team: Lotus
- Entries: 1 (0 starts)
- Championships: 0
- Wins: 0
- Podiums: 0
- Career points: 0
- Pole positions: 0
- Fastest laps: 0
- First entry: 1962 South African Grand Prix

Gary Stuart Hocking MBE (30 September 1937 – 21 December 1962) was a Rhodesian professional motorcycle road and car racer. He competed in the FIM Grand Prix motorcycle racing world championships from 1958 to 1962, most prominently as a member of the MV Agusta factory racing team where he won the 1961 350cc and 500cc world championships, and the 1961 Mallory Park Race of the Year.

== Early life ==
Hocking was born in Caerleon, near Newport, Monmouthshire, in south-east Wales, but grew up in Southern Rhodesia (renamed Zimbabwe in 1980) where he attended Gifford High School. As a teenager, he began racing motorcycles on grass tracks. Before long, he had moved on to road racing circuits.

== Motorcycle racing ==
Hocking left Rhodesia to compete in Europe in 1958 and made an immediate impact, finishing third behind the works MV Agustas at the Nürburgring. He was sponsored by Manchester tuner/dealer Reg Dearden, who provided him with new 350 and 500 cc Manx Norton racing motorcycles. He spent the winter of 1958/1959 with the Costain family at their home in Castletown on the Isle of Man, learning the Mountain Course with George 'Sparrow' Costain, an established rider for the Dearden team, who had won the Senior Manx Grand Prix on a 500 Dearden-tuned Manx in 1954. In the Junior TT of 1959 Hocking finished 12th from 22nd on the grid.

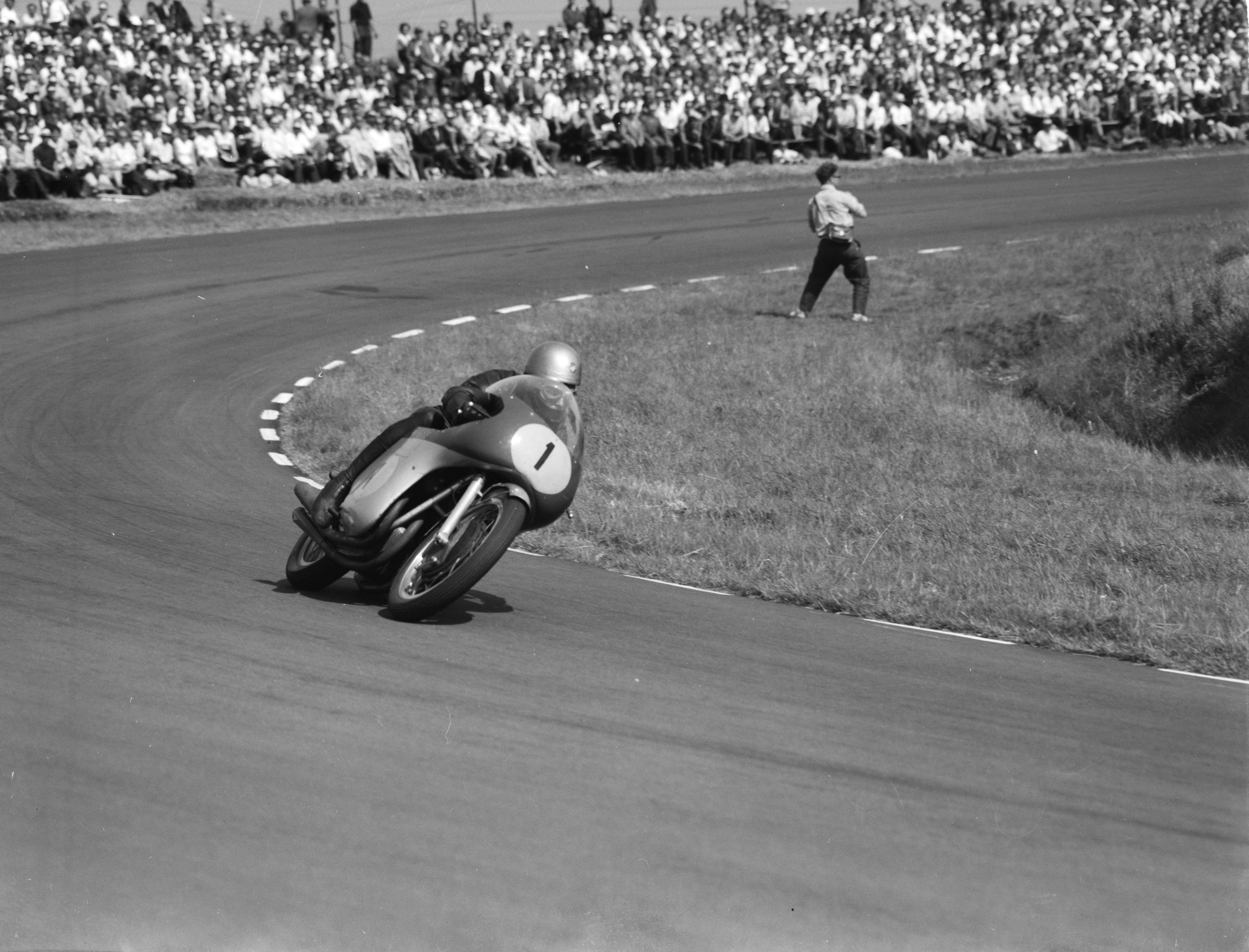
Hocking in action during the 1961 500cc Dutch TT.

In 1959, Hocking was offered a ride by the East German MZ factory and finished second in the 250cc championship. During practice for the 1959 Junior TT, his 350 Manx Norton, and the machines of teammates Terry Shepherd and John Hartle, were fitted with the top-secret works 350 cc Desmodromic engine, but they ran standard engines for the actual race. MV Agusta offered Hocking full factory support for the 1960 season and he repaid their confidence by finishing second in the 125 cc, 250 cc and 350 cc classes.

Following the retirement from motorcycle racing by defending champion, John Surtees in 1961, Hocking became MV Agusta's top rider and went on to claim dual World Championships in the 350 cc and 500 cc classes, in a dominant manner against little factory mounted opposition.

== Auto racing ==
Hocking was deeply affected by the death of his friend, Tom Phillis at the 1962 Isle of Man TT. After winning the Senior TT, he announced his retirement from motorcycle racing and returned to Rhodesia. He felt motorcycle racing was too dangerous and decided a career in auto racing would be safer. He entered the Danish Grand Prix, Gold Cup and Rand Grand Prix, achieving two fourth places.

Later that year, on 22 December, Hocking was killed during practice for the 1962 Natal Grand Prix at the Westmead circuit. His car, a Rob Walker entered Lotus 24, ran off the edge of the track at the end of the long right hand corner and somersaulted end over end twice. Hocking's head struck the roll hoop and he died some hours later in the Addington hospital in Durban. It is possible that the car suffered a front suspension failure, and it is also possible that incorrectly reassembled steering – Hocking had asked for a change on this item – might have been the cause; whatever was the reason, this caused the car to veer sharply to the left and somersault as he was going uphill and was approaching the crest of the rise. It is also likely that he was dehydrated and lost consciousness from that. He had been entered for the South African Grand Prix shortly awards, which would have allowed him to make his world championship debut, but following his death this was withdrawn. He was 25 years old.

== Motorcycle Grand Prix results ==
**Position**	1	2	3	4	5	6
**Points**	8	6	4	3	2	1

(key) (Races in bold indicate pole position; races in italics indicate fastest lap)

Year	Class	Team	1	2	3	4	5	6	7	8	9	10	11	Points	Rank	Wins
1958	500cc	Norton	IOM	NED; 6	BEL	GER; 3	SWE; 4	ULS	NAT					8	6th	0
1959	125cc	MZ		IOM	GER	NED	BEL	SWE	ULS; 2					7	9th	0
1959	125cc	MV Agusta								NAT; 6				7	9th	0
1959	250cc	MZ		IOM	GER	NED	BEL	SWE; 1	ULS; 1	NAT				16	**2nd**	2
1959	350cc	Norton	FRA; 2	IOM; 12	GER; 2			SWE	ULS	NAT				12	4th	0
1959	500cc	Norton	FRA; 3	IOM	GER	NED	BEL; 2		ULS	NAT				10	5th	0
1960	125cc	MV Agusta		IOM; 2	NED; 2	BEL; 5		ULS; 2	NAT; 5					18	**2nd**	0
1960	250cc	MV Agusta		IOM; 1	NED; 2	BEL; 2	GER; 1	ULS	NAT					28	**2nd**	2
1960	350cc	MV Agusta	FRA; 1	IOM	NED; 2			ULS	NAT; 1					22	**2nd**	2
1961	250cc	MV Agusta	ESP; 1	GER	FRA	IOM; NC	NED	BEL	DDR	ULS	NAT	SWE	ARG	8	8th	1
1961	350cc	MV Agusta		GER		IOM; 2	NED; 1		DDR; 1	ULS; 1	NAT; 1	SWE		32	**1st**	4
1961	500cc	MV Agusta		GER; 1	FRA; 1	IOM; NC	NED; 1	BEL; 1	DDR; 1	ULS; 1	NAT	SWE; 1	ARG	48	**1st**	7
1962	350cc	MV Agusta	IOM; 2	NED		ULS	DDR	NAT	FIN					6	8th	0
1962	500cc	MV Agusta	IOM; 1	NED	BEL	ULS	DDR	NAT	FIN	ARG				8	5th	1

== Formula One results ==
=== Complete Formula One World Championship results ===
(key)

Year	Entrant	Chassis	Engine	1	2	3	4	5	6	7	8	9	WDC	Pts.
1962	RRC Walker Racing Team	Lotus	Climax	NED	MON	BEL	FRA	GBR	GER	ITA	USA	RSA; WD	–	–

=== Non-championship results ===
(key)

Year	Entrant	Chassis	Engine	1	2	3	4	5	6	7	8	9	10	11	12	13	14	15	16	17	18	19	20
1962	Tim Parnell	Lotus 18/21	Climax Straight-4	CAP	BRX	LOM	LAV	GLV	PAU	AIN	INT	NAP	MAL	CLP	RMS	SOL	KAN	MED	DAN; 4	OUL; Ret	MEX		
1962	Rob Walker Racing Team	Lotus 24	Climax V8																			RAN; 4	NAT; DNS

Preceded by Ricardo Rodríguez	Formula One fatal accidents 21 December 1962	Succeeded by Carel Godin de Beaufort
