= 1959 Grand Prix motorcycle racing season =

Sports season

1959 F.I.M. Grand Prix motorcycle racing season

Seasons
- ← 1958 1960 →

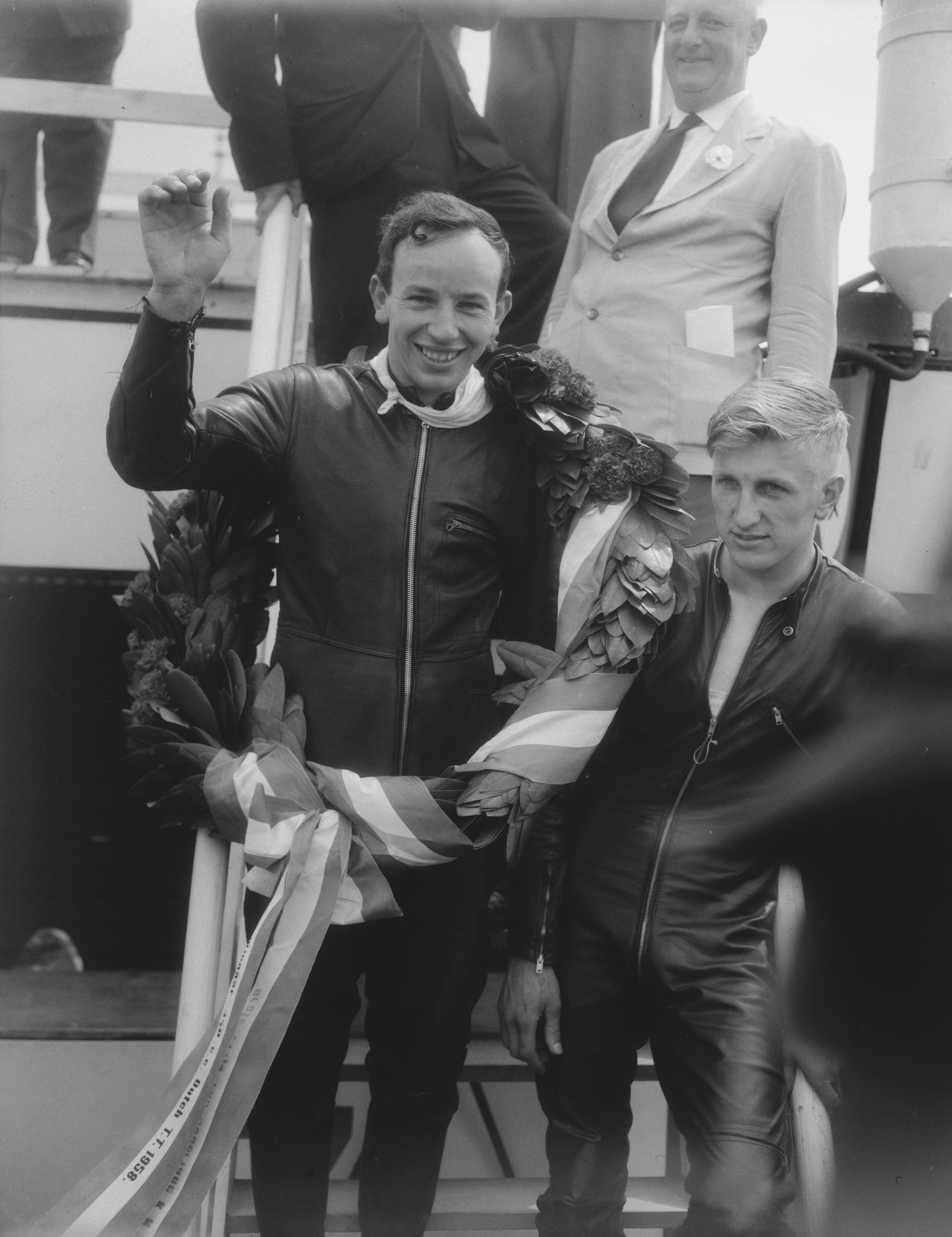
John Surtees (pictured in 1958) won all races to retain his 350cc and 500cc World Championship title.

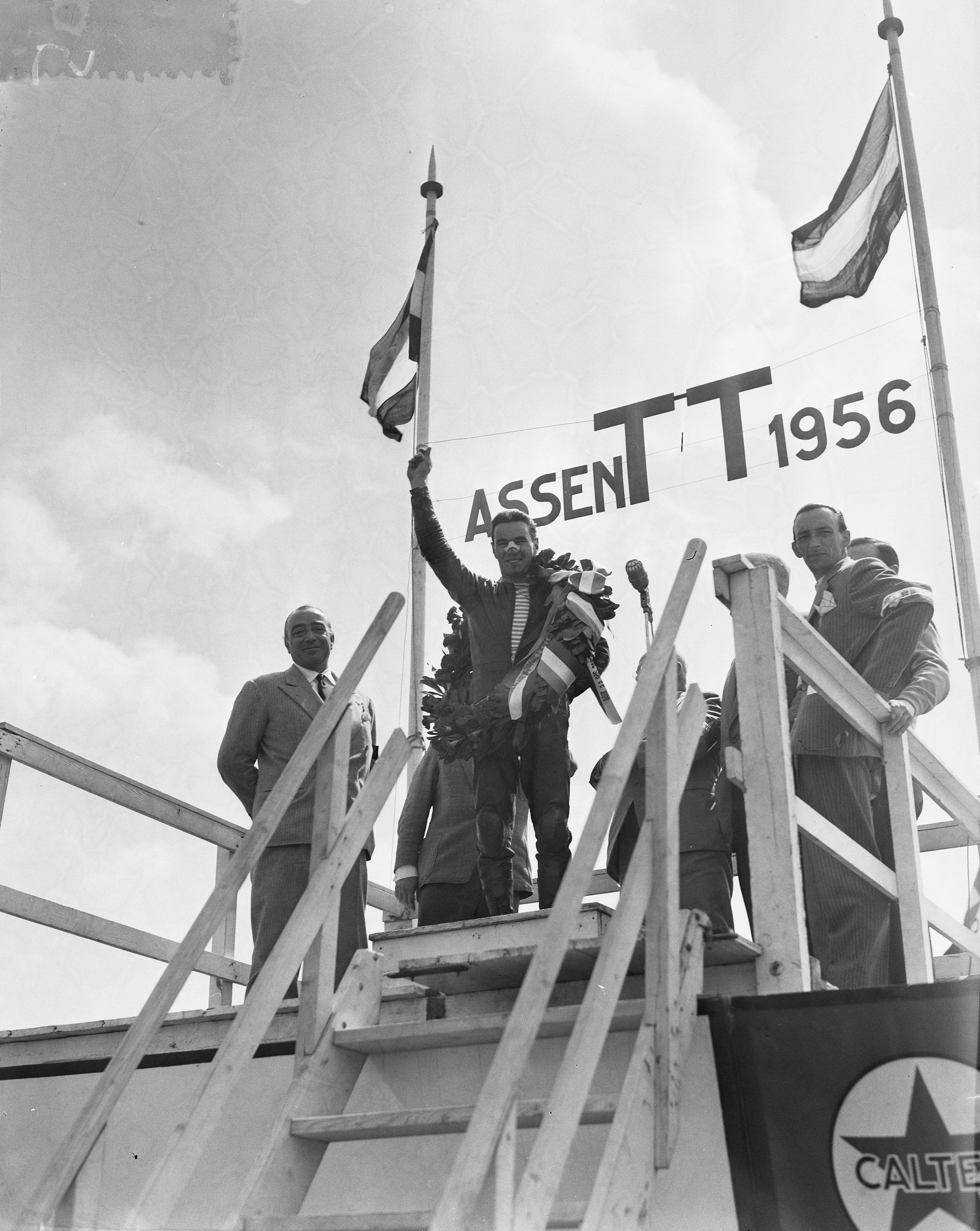
Carlo Ubbiali (pictured in 1956) successfully defended his 125cc World Championship title. He also became the 250cc World Champion in 1959.

The 1959 Grand Prix motorcycle racing season was the 11th F.I.M. Road Racing World Championship Grand Prix season. The season consisted of seven Grand Prix races in five classes: 500cc, 350cc, 250cc, 125cc and Sidecars 500cc. It began on 17 May, with French Grand Prix and ended with Nations Grand Prix in Italy on 6 September.

== 1959 Grand Prix season calendar ==
| Round | Date | Grand Prix | Circuit | 125cc winner | 250cc winner | 350cc winner | 500cc winner | Sidecars 500cc winner | Report |
|---|---|---|---|---|---|---|---|---|---|
| 1 | 17 May | (France) French Grand Prix | Charade Circuit | | | (United Kingdom) John Surtees | (United Kingdom) John Surtees | (Switzerland) (Germany) Scheidegger/Burkhardt | Report |
| 2 | 6 June | Isle of Man TT | Snaefell Mountain | (Italy) Tarquinio Provini | (Italy) Tarquinio Provini | (United Kingdom) John Surtees | (United Kingdom) John Surtees | (Germany) Schneider / Strauß | Report |
| 3 | 14 June | (West Germany) German Grand Prix | Hockenheimring | (Italy) Carlo Ubbiali | (Italy) Carlo Ubbiali | (United Kingdom) John Surtees | (United Kingdom) John Surtees | (Switzerland) (Germany) Camathias / Cecco | Report |
| 4 | 27 June | (Netherlands) Dutch TT | TT Circuit Assen | (Italy) Carlo Ubbiali | (Italy) Tarquinio Provini | (Australia) Bob Brown † | (United Kingdom) John Surtees | (Switzerland) (Germany) Camathias / Cecco | Report |
| 5 | 5 July | (Belgium) Belgian Grand Prix | Spa-Francorchamps | (Italy) Carlo Ubbiali | (Federation of Rhodesia and Nyasaland) Gary Hocking † | | (United Kingdom) John Surtees | (Germany) Schneider / Strauß | Report |
| 6 | 26 July | (Sweden) Swedish Grand Prix | Råbelövsbanan | (Italy) Tarquinio Provini | (Federation of Rhodesia and Nyasaland) Gary Hocking | (United Kingdom) John Surtees | (Australia) Bob Brown † | | Report |
| 7 | 8 August | (Northern Ireland) Ulster Grand Prix | Dundrod Circuit | (United Kingdom) Mike Hailwood | (Federation of Rhodesia and Nyasaland) Gary Hocking | (United Kingdom) John Surtees | (United Kingdom) John Surtees | | Report |
| 8 | 6 September | (Italy) Nations Grand Prix†† | Monza | (East Germany) Ernst Degner | (Italy) Carlo Ubbiali | (United Kingdom) John Surtees | (United Kingdom) John Surtees | | Report |

† Race did not count towards the World Championship.

†† The Nations Grand Prix also held a non-championship 175 cc race, won by the Italian, Francesco Villa.

== Standings ==
=== Scoring system ===
Points were awarded to the top six finishers in each race. Only the four best races were counted in all five classes: the Sidecars, 125cc, 250cc, 350cc and 500cc championships.

| Position | 1st | 2nd | 3rd | 4th | 5th | 6th |
|---|---|---|---|---|---|---|
| Points | 8 | 6 | 4 | 3 | 2 | 1 |

==== 500cc final standings ====
| Pos | Rider | Machine | FRA (France) | MAN (Isle of Man) | GER (Germany) | HOL (Netherlands) | BEL (Belgium) | ULS (Northern Ireland) | NAC (Italy) | Pts |
|---|---|---|---|---|---|---|---|---|---|---|
| 1 | (United Kingdom) John Surtees | MV Agusta | 1 | 1 | 1 | **1** | **1** | 1 | **1** | **32** (56) |
| 2 | (Italy) Remo Venturi | MV Agusta | 2 | | **2** | 3 | 5 | | 2 | **22** (24) |
| 3 | (Australia) Bob Brown | Norton | 9 | 3 | 3 | 2 | 4 | 5 | 4 | **17** (22) |
| 4 | (United Kingdom) Geoff Duke | Norton | | | 9 | | 3 | 3 | 3 | **12** |
| 5 | (Federation of Rhodesia and Nyasaland) Gary Hocking | Norton | 3 | | Ret | Ret | 2 | Ret | Ret | **10** |
| 6 | (United Kingdom) Bob McIntyre | Norton | | 5 | | | | 2 | | **8** |
| 7 | (United Kingdom) Alistair King | Norton | | 2 | | | | 6 | | **7** |
| 8 | (United Kingdom) Dickie Dale | BMW | 4 | Ret | Ret | 4 | 8 | 7 | Ret | **6** |
| 9 | (United Kingdom) Terry Shepherd | Norton | 5 | Ret | | | | 4 | | **5** |
| 10 | (New Zealand) John Hempleman | Norton | 17 | | 5 | Ret | Ret | 8 | 5 | **4** |
| 11 | (United Kingdom) Derek Powell | Matchless | | 4 | | | | 14 | | **3** |
| 12 | (Australia) Ken Kavanagh | Norton | | DNS | 4 | Ret | Ret | | | **3** |
| 13 | (South Africa) Paddy Driver | Norton | 6 | 6 | Ret | Ret | | Ret | 6 | **3** |
| 14 | (Federation of Rhodesia and Nyasaland) Jim Redman | Norton | | Ret | Ret | 5 | 9 | Ret | Ret | **2** |
| 15 | (United Kingdom) Bob Anderson | Norton | 8 | Ret | | Ret | 6 | | | **1** |
| 16 | (Australia) Ron Miles | Norton | | 12 | 12 | 6 | | 11 | | **1** |
| 17 | (Germany) Alois Huber | BMW | | | 6 | | | | | **1** |
| 18 | (Australia) Tom Phillis | Norton | 7 | 16 | Ret | Ret | 7 | Ret | | **0** |
| 19 | (Germany) Hans-Günter Jäger | BMW | 11 | | 10 | 7 | 16 | | 8 | **0** |
| 20 | (Germany) Ernst Hiller | BMW | | | 8 | Ret | | | 7 | **0** |
| 21 | (United Kingdom) Geoff Tanner | Norton | Ret | | 7 | 9 | 11 | | | **0** |
| 22 | (United Kingdom) Alan Shepherd | Matchless | | 7 | | | | 9 | | **0** |
| 23 | (United Kingdom) George Catlin | Matchless | | 8 | | | | | | **0** |
| = | (Netherlands) Anton Elbersen | BMW | | | 8 | | | | | **0** |
| 25 | (United Kingdom) Ralph Rensen | Norton | 10 | 9 | | | | 10 | | **0** |
| 26 | (Austria) Karl Untersteggaber | Norton | | | | | | | 9 | **0** |
| 27 | (United Kingdom) Derek Minter | Norton | | Ret | | Ret | 10 | | | **0** |
| = | (New Zealand) Peter Pawson | Norton | | 10 | | Ret | | Ret | | **0** |
| 29 | (Italy) Paolo Campanelli | Norton | | | | | | | 10 | **0** |
| 30 | (France) Jacques Insermini | Norton | Ret | | | | | | 11 | **0** |
| = | (United Kingdom) Brian Setchell | Norton | | 11 | | | | | | **0** |
| = | (Sweden) Evert Carlsson | BMW | | | 11 | | | | | **0** |
| 33 | (Belgium) Raymond Bogaerdt | Norton | | | | Ret | 12 | | | **0** |
| 34 | (France) Jacques Collot | Norton | 12 | | | | | | | **0** |
| = | (Italy) Vasco Loro | Norton | | | | | | | 12 | **0** |
| = | (United Kingdom) Stephen Murray | Matchless | | | | | | 12 | | **0** |
| 37 | (United Kingdom) Mike Hailwood | MV Agusta / Norton | | Ret | | | 13 | | Ret | **0** |
| = | (Italy) Alfredo Milani | Gilera | | | | Ret | Ret | | 13 | **0** |
| 39 | (France) Guy Ligier | Norton | 13 | | | | | | | **0** |
| = | (Germany) Rudolf Gläser | Norton | | | 13 | | | | | **0** |
| = | (United Kingdom) Robin Fitton | Norton | Ret | | | | | 13 | | **0** |
| = | (United Kingdom) Bill Smith | Matchless | | 13 | | | | | | **0** |
| 43 | (France) Yvon Callede | Norton | | | 14 | | | | | **0** |
| = | (United Kingdom) Ewan Haldane | Norton | | 14 | | | | | | **0** |
| = | (France) Charly Maubert | Norton | 14 | | | | | | | **0** |
| = | (Belgium) Jules Nies | Matchless | | | | | 14 | | | **0** |
| 47 | (United Kingdom) Don Chapman | Norton | | Ret | | | | 15 | | **0** |
| 48 | (France) Maurice de Polo | Norton | 15 | | | | | | | **0** |
| = | (Belgium) Raymond Hanset | Norton | | | | | 15 | | | **0** |
| = | (United Kingdom) Bob Rowbottom | Norton | | 15 | | | | | | **0** |
| 51 | (United Kingdom) Tommy McLeod | Norton | | | | | | 16 | | **0** |
| = | (France) Albert Montagne | Norton | 16 | | | | | | | **0** |
| 53 | (France) Jean-Pierre Bayle | Norton | Ret | | Ret | | 17 | | | **0** |
| = | (New Zealand) Stan Cameron | Matchless | | Ret | | | | 17 | | **0** |
| 55 | (United Kingdom) Joe Wright | Norton | | 17 | | | | | | **0** |
| 56 | (United Kingdom) Harry Grant | Norton / Matchless | | 18 | | | | 22 | | **0** |
| = | (United Kingdom) Jimmy Jones | Norton | | | | | | 18 | | **0** |
| 58 | (United Kingdom) William McCosh | Matchless | | | | | | 19 | | **0** |
| = | (United Kingdom) Fred Stevens | AJS | | 19 | | | | | | **0** |
| 60 | (Northern Ireland) Martin Brosnan | Norton | | | | | | 20 | | **0** |
| = | (United States) Ed LaBelle | BMW | | 20 | | | | | | **0** |
| 62 | (United Kingdom) George Northwood | Norton | | 21 | | | | | | **0** |
| = | (United Kingdom) Willie White | Norton | | | | | | 21 | | **0** |
| 64 | (United Kingdom) Vernon Cottle | Norton | | 22 | | | | | | **0** |
| 66 | (United Kingdom) Frank Gordon | Norton | | | | | | 23 | | **0** |
| 67 | (Northern Ireland) Ernie Oliver | AJS | | | | | | 24 | | **0** |
| 68 | (Northern Ireland) Jack Shannon | BSA | | | | | | 25 | | **0** |
| 69 | (United Kingdom) John Brown | Norton | | | | | | 26 | | **0** |
| - | (Australia) Eric Hinton | Norton | | Ret | | | | Ret | Ret | **0** |
| - | (United Kingdom) Jimmy Buchan Jr | Norton | | Ret | | | | Ret | | **0** |
| - | (Australia) Jack Findlay | Norton | | Ret | | | | Ret | | **0** |
| - | (United Kingdom) John Hartle | MV Agusta | | Ret | | | | Ret | | **0** |
| - | (United Kingdom) Llewelyn Ranson | Norton | | Ret | | | | Ret | | **0** |
| - | (Italy) Ernesto Brambilla | MV Agusta | | | Ret | | | | | **0** |
| - | (United Kingdom) Jack Brett | Norton | | Ret | | | | | | **0** |
| - | (United Kingdom) Jack Bullock | Matchless | | Ret | | | | | | **0** |
| - | (United Kingdom) Louis Carr | Norton | | Ret | | | | | | **0** |
| - | (United Kingdom) Eric Cheers | Norton | | Ret | | | | | | **0** |
| - | (Italy) Artemio Cirelli | Gilera | | | | | | | Ret | **0** |
| - | (United Kingdom) Barry Cortvriend | Matchless | | Ret | | | | | | **0** |
| - | (United Kingdom) George Costain | Norton | | Ret | | | | | | **0** |
| - | (Italy) Adolfo Covi | Norton | | | | | | | Ret | **0** |
| - | (Northern Ireland) Dick Creith | Norton | | | | | | Ret | | **0** |
| - | (Northern Ireland) Davy Crawford | Norton | | | | | | Ret | | **0** |
| - | (United Kingdom) Bruce Daniels | Norton | | Ret | | | | | | **0** |
| - | (United Kingdom) Bertie Farlow | Norton | | | | | | Ret | | **0** |
| - | (United Kingdom) Ray Fay | Norton | | Ret | | | | | | **0** |
| - | (United Kingdom) Peter Ferbrache | Matchless | | | | Ret | | | | **0** |
| - | (Northern Ireland) Bob Ferguson | Norton | | | | | | Ret | | **0** |
| - | (United States) Ralph Fox | AJS | | Ret | | | | | | **0** |
| - | (United Kingdom) Joe Glazebrook | Norton | | Ret | | | | | | **0** |
| - | (United Kingdom) Roger Graham | Norton | | Ret | | | | | | **0** |
| - | (United Kingdom) Owen Greenwood | Triumph | | Ret | | | | | | **0** |
| - | (Italy) Francesco Guglielminetti | Norton | | | | | | | Ret | **0** |
| - | (United Kingdom) Tom Hesketh | Norton | | Ret | | | | | | **0** |
| - | (United Kingdom) Tommy Holmes | BSA | | | | | | Ret | | **0** |
| - | (United Kingdom) Roy Ingram | Norton | | Ret | | | | | | **0** |
| - | (Northern Ireland) Len Ireland | Norton | | | | | | Ret | | **0** |
| - | (United Kingdom) Den Jarman | Norton | | Ret | | | | | | **0** |
| - | (Germany) Lothar John | BMW | | | Ret | | | | | **0** |
| - | (Germany) Host Kassner | Norton | | Ret | | | | | | **0** |
| - | (Italy) Luigi Marcelli | Norton | | | | | | | Ret | **0** |
| - | (Northern Ireland) Angus Martin | Norton | | Ret | | | | | | **0** |
| - | (Italy) Giuseppe Mantelli | Gilera | | | | | | | Ret | **0** |
| - | (Italy) Emanuele Maugliani | Gilera | | | | | | | Ret | **0** |
| - | (Northern Ireland) Robert McCracken | Norton | | | | | | Ret | | **0** |
| - | (Switzerland) Fritz Messerli | | Ret | | | | | | | **0** |
| - | (United Kingdom) Syd Mizen | Norton Dunstall | | Ret | | | | | | **0** |
| - | (United Kingdom) Albert Moule | Norton | | Ret | | | | | | **0** |
| - | (United Kingdom) Frank Perris | Norton | | | | Ret | | | | **0** |
| - | (United Kingdom) Harry Plews | AJS | | Ret | | | | | | **0** |
| - | (Austria) Ladislaus Richter | Norton | | | | Ret | | | | **0** |
| - | (United Kingdom) Bill Robertson | Norton | | Ret | | | | | | **0** |
| - | (Germany) Walter Scheimann | Norton | | | Ret | | | | | **0** |
| - | (Germany) Toni Schmitz | Norton | | | | | | Ret | | **0** |
| - | (United Kingdom) Ray Spence | Norton | | | | | | Ret | | **0** |
| - | (Canada) Don Tickle | Norton | | | | Ret | | | | **0** |
| - | (United Kingdom) Alan Trow | Norton | | Ret | | | | | | **0** |
| - | (Italy) Dino Valbonesi | Gilera | | | | | | | Ret | **0** |
| - | (France) Michel Valentin | | Ret | | | | | | | **0** |
| - | (Netherlands) Martinus van Son | Norton | | | | | | | Ret | **0** |
| - | (Italy) Roberto Vigorito | Norton | | | | | | | Ret | **0** |
| - | (United Kingdom) Arthur Wheeler | AJS | | Ret | | | | | | **0** |
| - | (United Kingdom) Lewis Young | Norton | | Ret | | | | | | **0** |
| - | (Italy) Benedetto Zambotti | Gilera | | | | | | | Ret | **0** |
| Pos | Rider | Bike | FRA (France) | MAN (United Kingdom) | GER (Germany) | HOL (Netherlands) | BEL (Belgium) | ULS (Ulster) | NAC (Italy) | Pts |

| Colour | Result |
|---|---|
| Gold | Winner |
| Silver | Second place |
| Bronze | Third place |
| Green | Points classification |
| Blue | Non-points classification |
| Blue | Non-classified finish (NC) |
| Purple | Retired, not classified (Ret) |
| Red | Did not qualify (DNQ) |
| Red | Did not pre-qualify (DNPQ) |
| Black | Disqualified (DSQ) |
| White | Did not start (DNS) |
| White | Withdrew (WD) |
| White | Race cancelled (C) |
| Blank | Did not practice (DNP) |
| Blank | Did not arrive (DNA) |
| Blank | Excluded (EX) |

**Bold** – Pole
Italics – Fastest Lap

=== 350cc Standings ===
| Place | Rider | Number | Country | Machine | Points | Wins |
|---|---|---|---|---|---|---|
| 1 | (United Kingdom) John Surtees | | United Kingdom | MV Agusta | 48 | 6 |
| 2 | (United Kingdom) John Hartle | | United Kingdom | MV Agusta | 16 | 0 |
| 3 | (Australia) Bob Brown | | Australia | Norton | 14 | 0 |
| 4 | (Federation of Rhodesia and Nyasaland) Gary Hocking | | Rhodesia | Norton | 12 | 0 |
| 5 | (United Kingdom) Geoff Duke | | United Kingdom | Norton | 10 | 0 |
| 6 | (Italy) Remo Venturi | | Italy | MV Agusta | 6 | 0 |
| 7 | (United Kingdom) Dickie Dale | | United Kingdom | AJS | 6 | 0 |
| 8 | (New Zealand) John Hempleman | | New Zealand | Norton | 6 | 0 |
| 9 | (United Kingdom) Bob Anderson | | United Kingdom | Norton | 5 | 0 |
| 10 | (United Kingdom) Alistair King | | United Kingdom | Norton | 4 | 0 |
| = | (Italy) Ernesto Brambilla | | Italy | MV Agusta | 4 | 0 |
| 12 | (South Africa) Paddy Driver | | South Africa | Norton | 4 | 0 |
| 13 | (United Kingdom) Mike Hailwood | | United Kingdom | AJS | 2 | 0 |
| = | (Australia) Tom Phillis | | Australia | Norton | 2 | 0 |
| 15 | (Federation of Rhodesia and Nyasaland) Jim Redman | | Rhodesia | Norton | 2 | 0 |
| 16 | (United Kingdom) Terry Shepherd | | United Kingdom | Norton | 1 | 0 |
| = | (United Kingdom) Dave Chadwick | | United Kingdom | Norton | 1 | 0 |
| = | (Italy) Gilberto Milani | | Italy | Norton | 1 | 0 |

=== 250cc Standings ===
| Place | Rider | Number | Country | Machine | Points | Wins |
|---|---|---|---|---|---|---|
| 1 | (Italy) Carlo Ubbiali | | Italy | MV Agusta | 28 | 2 |
| 2 | (Italy) Tarquinio Provini | | Italy | MV Agusta | 16 | 2 |
| = | (Federation of Rhodesia and Nyasaland) Gary Hocking | | Rhodesia | MZ | 16 | 2 |
| 4 | (East Germany) Ernst Degner | | East Germany | MZ | 14 | 0 |
| 5 | (United Kingdom) Mike Hailwood | | United Kingdom | Mondial | 13 | 0 |
| 6 | (Italy) Emilio Mendogni | | Italy | Morini | 10 | 0 |
| 7 | (United Kingdom) Derek Minter | | United Kingdom | Morini | 7 | 0 |
| 8 | (United Kingdom) Tommy Robb | | United Kingdom | GMS-MZ | 7 | 0 |
| 9 | (East Germany) Horst Fügner | | East Germany | MZ | 6 | 0 |
| 10 | (United Kingdom) Geoff Duke | | United Kingdom | Benelli | 5 | 0 |
| 11 | (United Kingdom) Dave Chadwick | | United Kingdom | MV Agusta | 4 | 0 |
| 12 | (Italy) Libero Liberati | | Italy | Morini | 3 | 0 |
| 13 | (West Germany) Horst Kassner | | West Germany | NSU | 2 | 0 |
| = | (United Kingdom) Phil Carter | | United Kingdom | NSU | 2 | 0 |
| = | (Switzerland) Luigi Taveri | | Switzerland | MZ | 2 | 0 |
| 16 | (Austria) Rudi Thalhammer | | Austria | NSU | 1 | 0 |
| = | (United Kingdom) Dickie Dale | | United Kingdom | Benelli | 1 | 0 |
| 18 | (West Germany) Günter Beer | | West Germany | Adler | 1 | 0 |

=== 125cc ===
==== Riders' standings ====
| Pos. | Rider | Bike | MAN (Isle of Man) | GER (Germany) | NED (Netherlands) | BEL (Belgium) | SWE (Sweden) | ULS (Northern Ireland) | NAT (Italy) | Pts |
|---|---|---|---|---|---|---|---|---|---|---|
| 1 | (Italy) Carlo Ubbiali | MV Agusta | 5 | 1**^{F}** | 1**^{F}** | 1 | 2**^{F}** | | 2**^{F}** | 30 (38) |
| 2 | (Italy) Tarquinio Provini | MV Agusta | 1 | 2 | | 2**^{F}** | 1 | | 5 | 28 (30) |
| 3 | (United Kingdom) Mike Hailwood | Ducati | 3 | 3 | 3 | | 4 | 1**^{F}** | | 20 (23) |
| 4 | (Switzerland) Luigi Taveri | MZ | 2**^{F}** | | | | | | | 14 |
| 4 | (Switzerland) Luigi Taveri | Ducati | | | | 3 | | | 3 | 14 |
| 5 | (East Germany) Ernst Degner | MZ | | 6 | | | | 3 | 1 | 13 |
| 6 | (Italy) Bruno Spaggiari | Ducati | | 5 | 2 | | | | | 8 |
| 7 | (United Kingdom) Derek Minter | MZ | | | 5 | 4 | | | 4 | 8 |
| 8 | (Australia) Ken Kavanagh | Ducati | | | 6 | 5 | 5 | 4 | | 8 |
| 9 | (Federation of Rhodesia and Nyasaland) Gary Hocking | MZ | | | | | | 2 | | 7 |
| 9 | (Federation of Rhodesia and Nyasaland) Gary Hocking | MV Agusta | | | | | | | 6 | 7 |
| 10 | (East Germany) Horst Fügner | MZ | 4 | | 4 | | | | | 6 |
| 11 | (East Germany) Werner Musiol | MZ | | | | | 3 | | | 4 |
| 12 | (Italy) Francesco Villa | Ducati | | 4 | | | | | | 3 |
| 13 | (Italy) Alberto Pagani | Ducati | | | | | | 5 | | 2 |
| 14 | (Japan) Naomi Taniguchi | Honda | 6 | | | | | | | 1 |
| 14 | (West Germany) Karl Kronmüller | Ducati | | | | 6 | | | | 1 |
| 14 | (Sweden) Ulf Svensson | Ducati | | | | | 6 | | | 1 |
| 14 | (United Kingdom) Arthur Wheeler | Ducati | | | | | | 6 | | 1 |
| Pos. | Rider | Bike | MAN (Isle of Man) | GER (Germany) | NED (Netherlands) | BEL (Belgium) | SWE (Sweden) | ULS (Northern Ireland) | NAT (Italy) | Pts |

Race key
| Colour | Result |
|---|---|
| Gold | Winner |
| Silver | 2nd place |
| Bronze | 3rd place |
| Green | Points finish |
| Blue | Non-points finish |
| Blue | Non-classified finish (NC) |
| Purple | Retired (Ret) |
| Red | Did not qualify (DNQ) |
| Black | Disqualified (DSQ) |
| White | Did not start (DNS) |
| White | Withdrew (WD) |
| White | Race cancelled (C) |
| Blank | Did not practice (DNP) |
| Blank | Excluded (EX) |
| Blank | Did not arrive (DNA) |
| Blank | Did not enter (empty cell) |
| Annotation | Meaning |
| P | Pole position |
| F | Fastest lap |
Rider key
| Colour | Meaning |
| Light blue | Rookie rider |

==== Constructors' standings ====
Each constructor is awarded the same number of points as their best placed rider in each race.

| Pos. | Constructor | MAN (Isle of Man) | GER (Germany) | NED (Netherlands) | BEL (Belgium) | SWE (Sweden) | ULS (Northern Ireland) | NAT (Italy) | Pts |
|---|---|---|---|---|---|---|---|---|---|
| 1 | (Italy) MV Agusta | 1 | 1 | 1 | 1 | 1 | | 2 | 32 (46) |
| 2 | (East Germany) MZ | 2 | 6 | 4 | 4 | 3 | 2 | 1 | 24 (31) |
| 3 | (Italy) Ducati | 3 | 3 | 2 | 3 | 4 | 1 | 3 | 22 (33) |
| 4 | (Japan) Honda | 6 | | | | | | | 1 |
| Pos. | Constructor | MAN (Isle of Man) | GER (Germany) | NED (Netherlands) | BEL (Belgium) | SWE (Sweden) | ULS (Northern Ireland) | NAT (Italy) | Pts |
