= Alistair King =

Scottish motorcycle racer

- Nationality: British
Motorcycle racing career statistics
Grand Prix motorcycle racing
Active years	1958 – 1959, 1961
First race	1958 Isle of Man 350cc Junior TT
Last race	1961 350cc Ulster Grand Prix
Starts / Wins / Podiums / Poles / F. laps / Points; 8 / 0 / 5 / N/A / N/A / 28

Alistair King was a Scottish professional Grand Prix motorcycle road racer. His best season was in 1961 when he finished the year in fifth place in the 500cc world championship. In 1954 he won the Isle of Man Clubmans Senior TT. King finished second to John Surtees in the 1959 Isle of Man Senior TT and won the 350cc Formula One TT. He was also a two-time winner of the 350 class at the North West 200 race held in Northern Ireland.
