= Ralph Rensen =

British motorcycle racer

- Nationality: British
- Born: 1933
- Died: 16 June 1961 (aged 27–28); Isle of Man
Motorcycle racing career statistics
Grand Prix motorcycle racing
Active years	1960 - 1961
First race	1960 Isle of Man TT 350cc Junior TT
Last race	1961 Isle of Man TT 350cc Junior TT
Starts / Wins / Podiums / Poles / F. laps / Points; 5 / 0 / 1 / 0 / 0 / 6

Ralph Beverly Rensen was an English Grand Prix motorcycle road racer.

Rensen was killed on 16 June 1961 while competing in the 1961 Isle of Man TT, aged 28 years.

Rensen was born in Liverpool. His father was Dutch and an executive with a firm in Crosby. Ralph attended St Mary's College, Crosby. He is buried in the Borough Cemetery, Douglas Isle Of Man, almost directly opposite the grandstand.

From 1953 up to his death in 1961, Rensen competed in every year of the Isle of Man TT.

Rensen started his racing career in the Manx Grand Prix of 1953 in the 350cc 'Junior' class but did not finish the race. The race in the 500cc 'Senior' class he finished 33rd.

The next year, 1954, he finished in the 350cc in 14th place.

From 1955 up to and including 1960, Rensen competed in the Junior TT, the Senior TT and the Ulster Grand Prix. All these years he rode Norton Manx models, except for the 250cc Velocette in 1957 which he failed to finish, and a one-off appearance with the NSU Sportmax of Fron Purslow in 1960, after Purslow had injured himself in training.

In 1959, Rensen also started in the 500cc-class of the French GP.

In 1960, Rensen won his first championship points when finishing fifth in the 350cc and fourth after a photo finish in the 500cc Ulster Grand Prix. These results led to a 12th place in the final world championship classification of both the 350cc-class as well as the 500cc-class.

Meanwhile, Rensen raced in many national races in Northern Ireland and during the Cookstown 100 of 1960 he declared that he wanted to stop racing after his friend Dave Chadwick had fatally crashed during races in Mettet.

However, in 1961 he was hired by Bultaco as factory rider. His season started with the 500cc race in the German GP on the Hockenheimring but he did not manage to finish with his Norton. The following 350cc race he finished in fourth place.

The next race was the Isle of Man TT. In the Junior TT, he finished third behind Phil Read (Norton) and Gary Hocking (MV Agusta), and in the 'Lightweight', 125cc TT he finished sixth on his Bultaco.

During the Senior TT, Rensen fatally crashed near milestone eleven of the Snaefell Mountain Course. At the end of that year he finished posthumously sixth in the 350cc-class and 19th in the 125cc world championship.
