= Horst Fügner =

German motorcycle racer

- Nationality: German
- Born: 11 March 1923; Chemnitz, Saxony, Germany
- Died: 22 November 2014 (aged 91); Chemnitz, Saxony, Germany
Motorcycle racing career statistics
Grand Prix motorcycle racing
Active years	1957 – 1959
First race	1957 125cc German Grand Prix
Last race	1959 250cc Dutch TT
First win	1958 250cc Swedish Grand Prix
Last win	1958 250cc Swedish Grand Prix
Team	MZ
Starts / Wins / Podiums / Poles / F. laps / Points; 12 / 1 / 3 / N/A / N/A / 38

Horst Fügner (11 March 1923 – 22 November 2014) was a German former Grand Prix motorcycle road racer. He rode for the East German MZ works team from 1954 and rode in Grands Prix from 1957.

In 1955, 1956 and 1958, Fügner won the 250cc class of the East German motorcycling championship. His best year was 1958 when he won the Swedish Grand Prix and finished the season second to Tarquinio Provini in the 250cc World Championship.
