= 1959 Isle of Man TT =

Annual motorcycle racing event

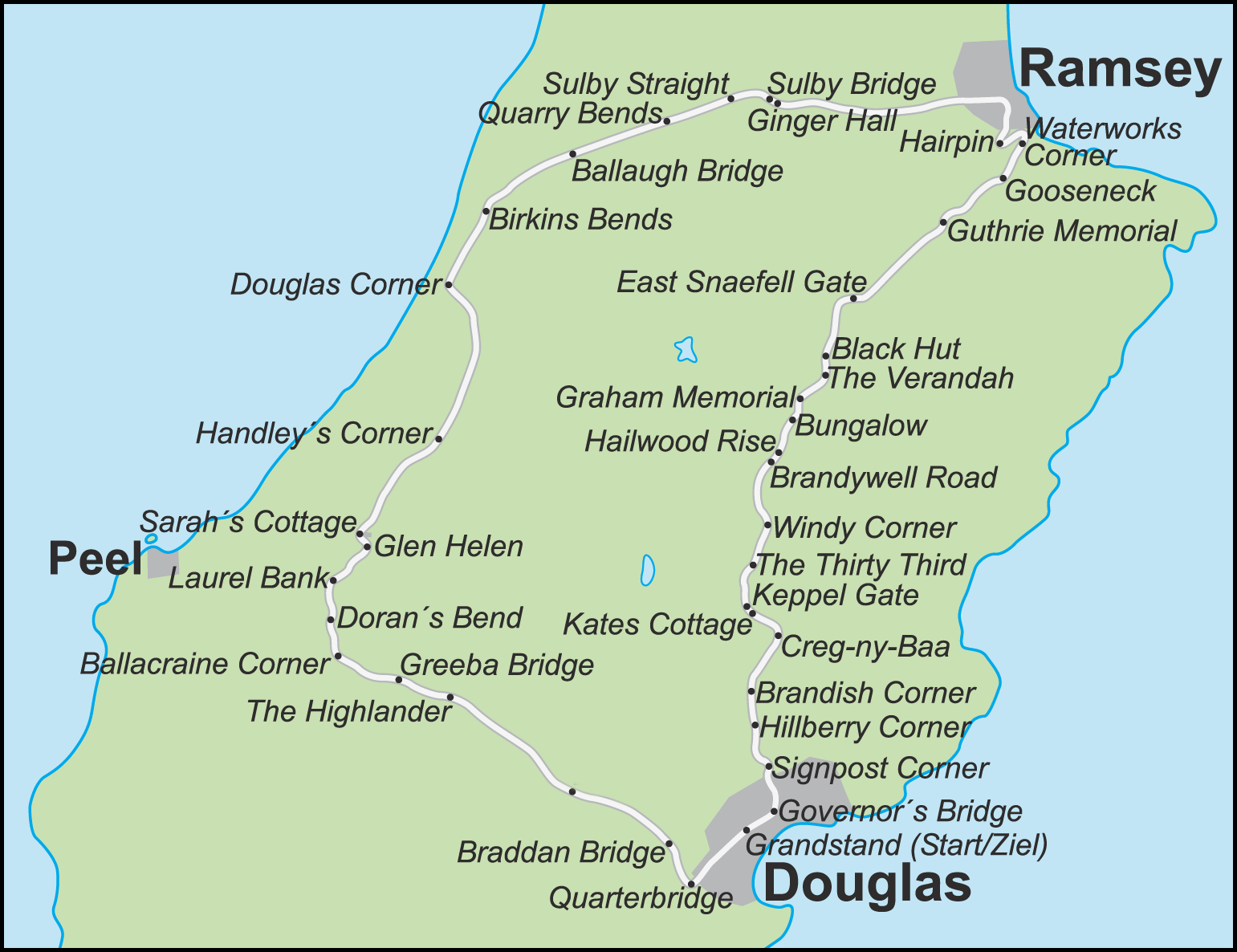
Map Image of Isle of Man

The 1959 Isle of Man TT, the second round of the 1959 Grand Prix motorcycle racing season, involved races on both the Mountain Course and the Clypse Course on the Isle of Man. John Surtees won the Senior race with a time of 3:00.13.4, adding to his earlier victory in the Junior race. Tarquinio Provini won both the Lightweight and Ultra-Lightweight categories, while Walter Schneider and H.Strauss won the sidecar event.

== 1959 Isle of Man Junior TT 350cc final standings ==
7 Laps (264.11 Miles) Mountain Course.

Place	Rider	Number	Country	Machine	Speed	Time	Points
1	(United Kingdom) John Surtees		Britain	MV Agusta	95.38 mph	2:46.08.0	8
2	(United Kingdom) John Hartle		Britain	MV Agusta	93.65 mph	2:49.12.2	6
3	(United Kingdom) Alistair King		Britain	Norton	93.56 mph	2:49.22.6	4
4	(United Kingdom) Geoff Duke		Britain	Norton	93.10 mph	2:50.12.4	3
5	(United Kingdom) Bob Anderson		Britain	Norton	92.67 mph	2:50.59.6	2
6	(United Kingdom) Dave Chadwick		Britain	Norton	92.51 mph	2:51.17.6	1

== 1959 Isle of Man Lightweight TT 250cc final standings ==
10 Laps (107.90 miles) Clypse Course.

Place	Rider	Number	Country	Machine	Speed	Time	Points
1	(Italy) Tarquinio Provini		Italy	MV Agusta	77.77 mph	1:23.15.8	8
2	(Italy) Carlo Ubbiali		Italy	MV Agusta	77.76 mph	1:23.16.2	6
3	(United Kingdom) Dave Chadwick		Britain	MV Agusta	74.52 mph	1:26.52.4	4
4	(United Kingdom) Tommy Robb		Britain	GMS	73.60 mph	1:27.57.0	3
5	(West Germany) Horst Kassner		Germany	NSU	72.18 mph	1:29.43.0	2
6	(Austria) Rudi Thalhammer		Austria	NSU	72.07 mph	1:29.49.6	1

== 1959 Isle of Man Ultra-Lightweight TT 125cc final standings ==
10 Laps (107.90 miles) Clypse Course.

Place	Rider	Number	Country	Machine	Speed	Time	Points
1	(Italy) Tarquinio Provini		Italy	MV Agusta	74.06 mph	1:27.52.2	8
2	(Switzerland) Luigi Taveri		Switzerland	MZ	73.95 mph	1:27.32.6	6
3	(United Kingdom) Mike Hailwood		Britain	Ducati	72.15 mph	1:29.44.0	4
4	(East Germany) Horst Fügner		Germany	MZ	71.91 mph	1:30.11.6	3
5	(Italy) Carlo Ubbiali		Italy	MV Agusta	71.20 mph	1:30.56.6	2
6	(Japan) Naomi Taniguchi		Japan	Honda	68.29 mph	1:34.48.0	1

== 1959 Sidecar TT final standings ==
10 Laps (107.90 miles) Clypse Course.

Place	Rider	Number	Country	Machine	Speed	Time	Points
1	(West Germany) Walter Schneider/H.Strauss	3	Germany	BMW	72.69 mph	1:29.03.8	8
2	(Switzerland) Florian Camathias/H.Cecco	9	Switzerland	BMW	71.05 mph	1:31.06.8	6
3	(Switzerland) Fritz Scheidegger/H.Burkhardt	25	Switzerland	BMW	69.42 mph	1:33.16.2	4
4	(West Germany) Helmut Fath/A.Wohlgemuth	5	Germany	BMW	68.95 mph	1:33.51.0	3
5	(West Germany) Edgar Strub/R Mick Woolett	17	Germany	BMW	67.31 mph	1:36.12.2	2
6	(United Kingdom) Owen Greenwood/Terry Fairbrother	28	Britain	Norton	66.56 mph	1:37.15.8	1

== 1959 Isle of Man Senior TT 500cc final standings ==
7 Laps (274.11 Miles) Mountain Course.

Place	Rider	Number	Country	Machine	Speed	Time	Points
1	(United Kingdom) John Surtees		Britain	MV Agusta	87.94 mph	3:00.13.4	8
2	(United Kingdom) Alistair King		Britain	Norton	85.50 mph	3:05.21.0	6
3	(Australia) Bob Brown		Australia	Norton	83.00 mph	3:10.56.4	4
4	(United Kingdom) Derek T.Powell		Britain	Matchless	82.87 mph	3:11.14.2	3
5	(United Kingdom) Bob McIntyre		Britain	Norton	82.34 mph	3:12.27.8	2
6	(South Africa) Paddy Driver		South Africa	Norton	81.34 mph	3:14.55.4	1
