= 1961 Grand Prix motorcycle racing season =

Sports season

1961 F.I.M. Grand Prix motorcycle racing season

Seasons
- ← 1960 1962 →

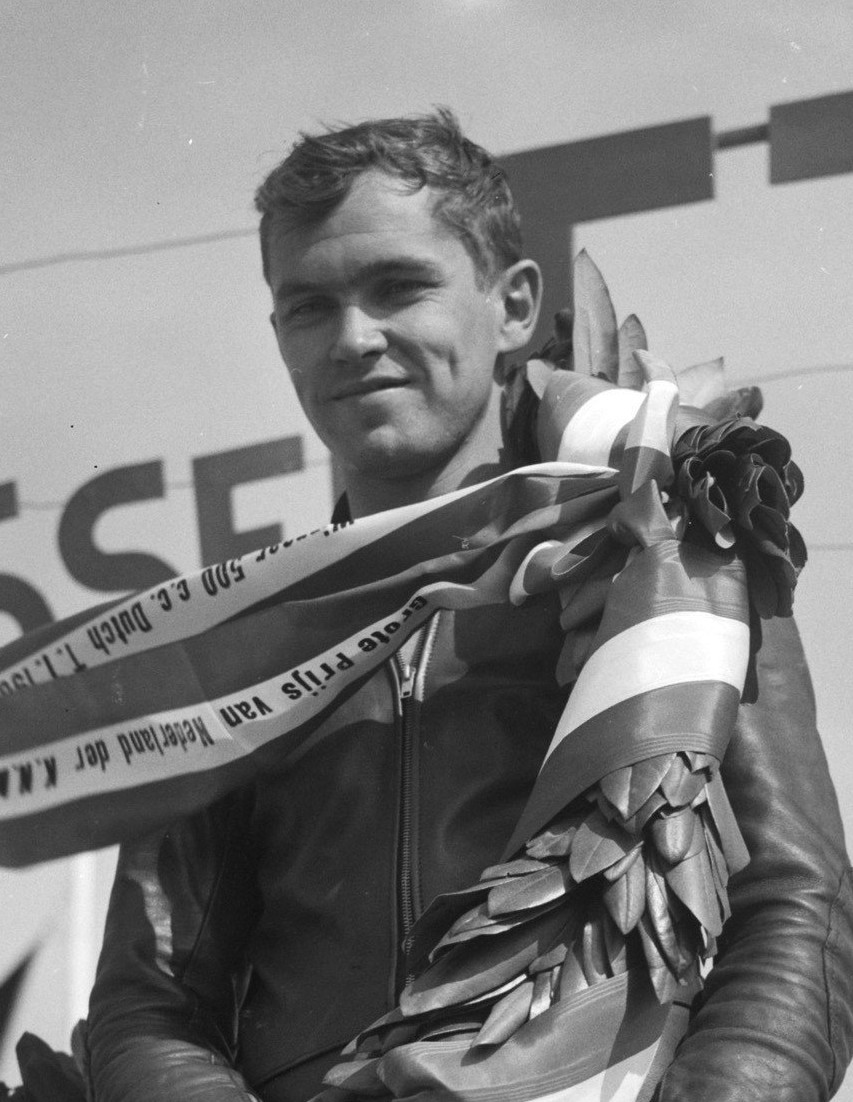
Gary Hocking, the 1961 350cc and 500cc World Champion.

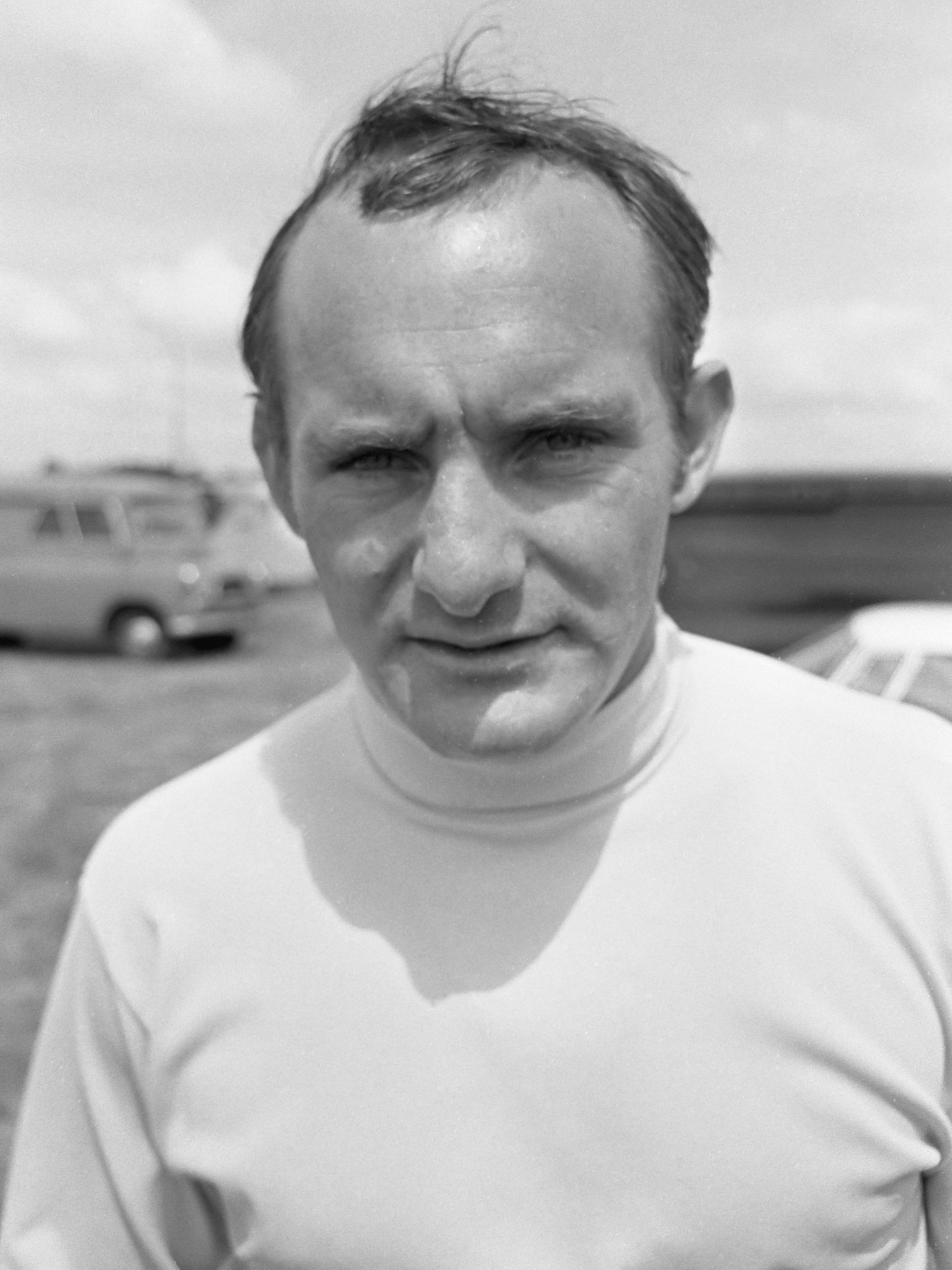
Mike Hailwood (pictured in 1967) won his first out of 9 World Championship titles in the 250cc class in 1961.

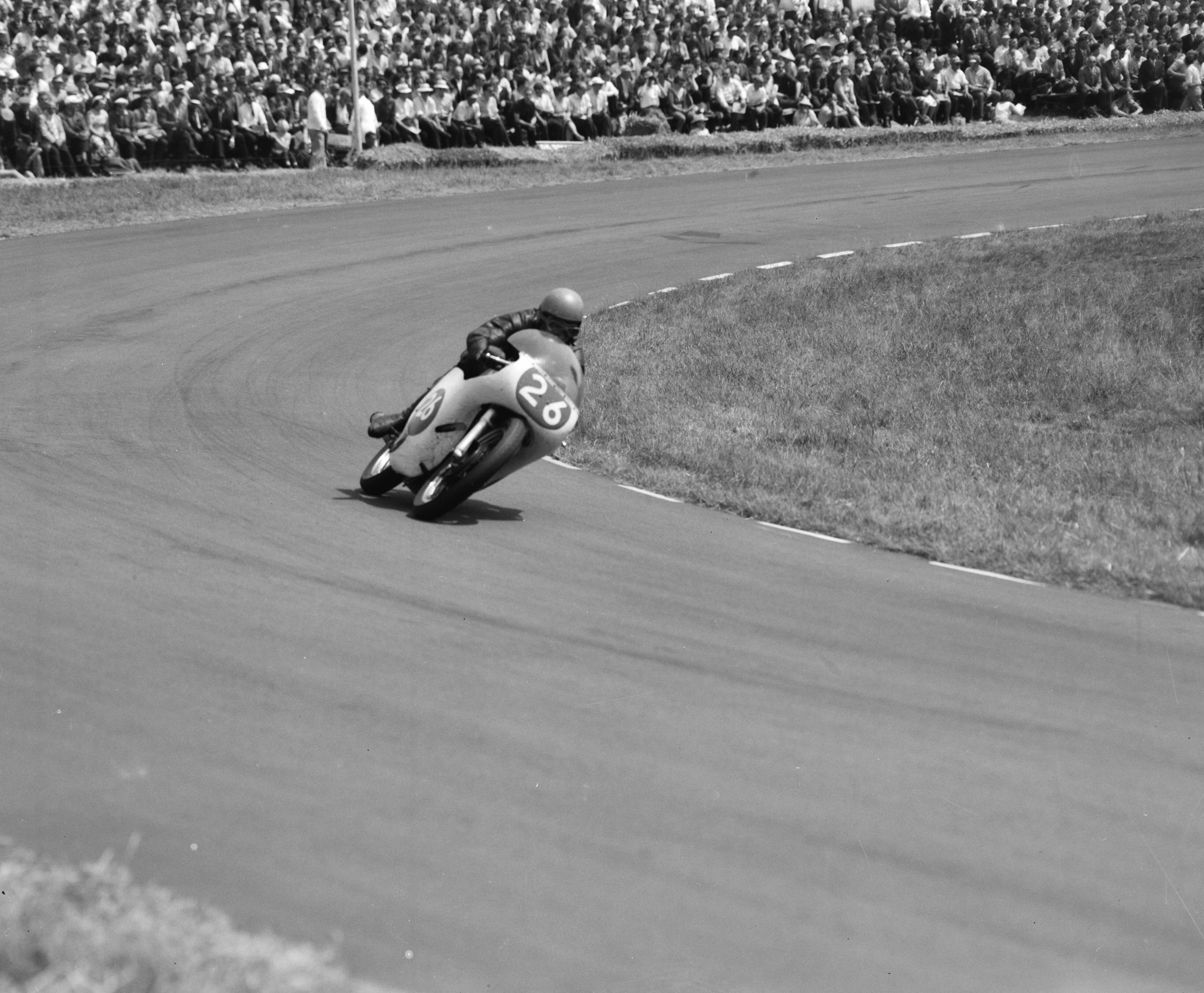
Tom Phillis won the title in the 125cc class.

The 1961 Grand Prix motorcycle racing season was the 13th F.I.M. Road Racing World Championship Grand Prix season. The season consisted of eleven Grand Prix races in five classes: 500cc, 350cc, 250cc, 125cc and Sidecars 500cc. It began on 23 April, with Spanish Grand Prix and ended with Argentine Grand Prix on 15 October.

== 1961 Grand Prix season calendar ==
Round	Date	Grand Prix	Circuit	125cc winner	250cc winner	350cc winner	500cc winner	Sidecars 500cc winner	Report
1	23 April	(Spain) Spanish Grand Prix	Montjuïc Circuit	(Australia) Tom Phillis	(Federation of Rhodesia and Nyasaland) Gary Hocking			(West Germany) Fath / Wohlgemuth	Report
2	14 May	(West Germany) West German Grand Prix	Hockenheimring	(East Germany) Ernst Degner	(Japan) Kunimitsu Takahashi	(Czechoslovakia) František Šťastný	(Federation of Rhodesia and Nyasaland) Gary Hocking	(West Germany) Deubel / Hörner	Report
3	21 May	(France) French Grand Prix	Circuit de Charade	(Australia) Tom Phillis	(Australia) Tom Phillis		(Federation of Rhodesia and Nyasaland) Gary Hocking	(Switzerland) (West Germany) Scheidegger / Burkhardt	Report
4	12 June	Isle of Man TT	Snaefell Mountain Course	(United Kingdom) Mike Hailwood	(United Kingdom) Mike Hailwood	(United Kingdom) Phil Read	(United Kingdom) Mike Hailwood	(West Germany) Deubel / Hörner	Report
5	24 June	(Netherlands) Dutch TT	TT Circuit Assen	(Australia) Tom Phillis	(United Kingdom) Mike Hailwood	(Federation of Rhodesia and Nyasaland) Gary Hocking	(Federation of Rhodesia and Nyasaland) Gary Hocking	(West Germany) Deubel / Hörner	Report
6	2 July	(Belgium) Belgian Grand Prix	Spa-Francorchamps	(Switzerland) Luigi Taveri	(Federation of Rhodesia and Nyasaland) Jim Redman		(Federation of Rhodesia and Nyasaland) Gary Hocking	(Switzerland) (West Germany) Scheidegger / Burkhardt	Report
7	30 July	(East Germany) East German Grand Prix	Sachsenring	(East Germany) Ernst Degner	(United Kingdom) Mike Hailwood	(Federation of Rhodesia and Nyasaland) Gary Hocking	(Federation of Rhodesia and Nyasaland) Gary Hocking		Report
8	12 August	(Northern Ireland) Ulster Grand Prix	Dundrod Circuit	(Japan) Kunimitsu Takahashi	(Scotland) Bob McIntyre	(Federation of Rhodesia and Nyasaland) Gary Hocking	(Federation of Rhodesia and Nyasaland) Gary Hocking		Report
9	3 September	(Italy) Nations Grand Prix	Autodromo Nazionale Monza	(East Germany) Ernst Degner	(Federation of Rhodesia and Nyasaland) Jim Redman	(Federation of Rhodesia and Nyasaland) Gary Hocking	(United Kingdom) Mike Hailwood		Report
10	17 September	(Sweden) Swedish Grand Prix	Råbelövsbanan	(Switzerland) Luigi Taveri	(United Kingdom) Mike Hailwood	(Czechoslovakia) František Šťastný	(Federation of Rhodesia and Nyasaland) Gary Hocking		Report
11	15 October	(Argentina) Argentine Grand Prix	Autódromo de Buenos Aires	(Australia) Tom Phillis	(Australia) Tom Phillis		(Argentina) Jorge Kissling		Report

== Standings ==
=== Scoring system ===
Points were awarded to the top six finishers in each race. Only the best of six races were counted in 125cc, 250cc, 350cc and 500cc championships, while in the Sidecars, the best of four were counted.

Position	1st	2nd	3rd	4th	5th	6th
Points	8	6	4	3	2	1

==== 500cc final standings ====
Pos	Rider	Machine	GER (Germany)	FRA (France)	MAN (Isle of Man)	HOL (Netherlands)	BEL (Belgium)	DDR (East Germany)	ULS (Northern Ireland)	NAC (Italy)	SWE (Sweden)	ARG (Argentina)	Pts
1	(Federation of Rhodesia and Nyasaland) Gary Hocking	MV Agusta	1	1	Ret	1	1	1	1	Ret	1		**48** (56)
2	(United Kingdom) Mike Hailwood	Norton / MV Agusta	4	2	1	2	2	2	2	1	2		**40** (55)
3	(United Kingdom) Frank Perris	Norton	2			5		Ret		Ret	3	3	**16**
4	(Scotland) Bob McIntyre	Norton			2	3	3						**14**
5	(Scotland) Alistair King	Norton			4				3	2	Ret		**13**
6	(Austria) Bert Schneider	Norton			18	Ret		3		5	4		**9**
7	(Argentina) Jorge Kissling	Matchless										1	**8**
8	(United Kingdom) Ron Langston	Matchless			5		5		4		Ret		**7**
9	(Argentina) Juan Carlos Salatino	Norton										2	**6**
10	(South Africa) Paddy Driver	Norton	Ret		Ret		6	Ret		3			**5**
11	(Canada) Mike Duff	Matchless			14		4		10		5		**5**
12	(Germany) Hans-Günter Jäger	BMW / Norton	3							8			**4**
13	(Australia) Tom Phillis	Norton			3				Ret				**4**
14	(France) Antoine Paba	Norton		3									**4**
15	(Australia) John Farnsworth	Matchless / Norton			38			4	9		Ret		**3**
16	(United Kingdom) Phil Read	Norton			Ret	4	Ret						**3**
17	(Switzerland) Gyula Marsovszky	Norton		4	Ret								**3**
18	(Italy) Alberto Pagani	Norton								4			**3**
=	(Argentina) Juan Perkins	Norton										4	**3**
20	(Australia) Jack Findlay	Norton			DNS	DNS	8	5	8	6	Ret		**3**
21	(Germany) Ernst Hiller	BMW / Matchless	5			19	Ret			11	Ret		**2**
22	(United Kingdom) Peter Chatterton	Norton			20				5				**2**
23	(Switzerland) Fritz Masserli	Matchless		5	44								**2**
24	(Argentina) Eduardo Salatino	Norton										5	**2**
25	(New Zealand) Peter Pawson	Matchless / Norton			8	Ret	7				6		**1**
26	(Germany) Roland Föll	Matchless	8	6	Ret						11		**1**
27	(Germany) Lothar John	BMW	6			10	14	9			10		**1**
28	(Australia) Ron Miles	Norton			12	6			NEL				**1**
29	(Northern Ireland) Tom Thorp	Norton			13				6				**1**
30	(Finland) Anssi Resko	Norton / Matchless						6	11				**1**
31	(Uruguay) Horacio Costas	Norton										6	**1**
=	(United Kingdom) Tony Godfrey	Norton			6								**1**
33	(Germany) Karl Hoppe	Norton	Ret			7	11			7			**0**
34	(Northern Ireland) Tommy Robb	Matchless			Ret				7		8		**0**
35	(United Kingdom) Roy Ingram	Norton			7		10		Ret				**0**
36	(United Kingdom) Vernon Cottle	Norton	7		21			11			12		**0**
37	(Austria) Rudi Thalhammer	Norton				11					7		**0**
38	(Federation of Rhodesia and Nyasaland) Tommy Robinson	Norton						7			Ret		**0**
39	(Belgium) Raphaël Orinel	Norton		7									**0**
40	(Australia) Trevor Pound	Norton				8	9						**0**
41	(France) Jacques Insermini	Norton	12	11		Ret		8		Ret			**0**
42	(France) Louis Bernagozzi	Norton		8									**0**
43	(Germany) Rudolf Gläser	Norton	Ret		Ret	15				9	Ret		**0**
44	(Austria) Edy Lenz	Norton			45						9		**0**
45	(United Kingdom) Ellis Boyce	Norton			9				Ret				**0**
46	(France) Rene Goetz	BSA		9									**0**
=	(Germany) Klaus Hamelmann	Norton	9										**0**
48	(Germany) Heinz Kauert	Matchless	10			Ret							**0**
=	(Germany) Toni Schmitz	Norton		Ret	Ret			10					**0**
50	(France) Georges Comy	Norton		10									**0**
=	(United Kingdom) Fred Stevens	Norton			10								**0**
=	(Italy) Roberto Vigorito	Norton								10			**0**
53	(United Kingdom) Peter Horton	Norton	11			Ret							**0**
=	(United Kingdom) Jack Bullock	Norton			11								**0**
55	(United Kingdom) Alf Shaw	Norton			41				12				**0**
56	(United Kingdom) Geoffrey Tanner	Norton	Ret		Ret	12							**0**
57	(United Kingdom) Dan Shorey	Norton			Ret		12						**0**
58	(Germany) Joachim Claus	Norton						12					**0**
=	(Switzerland) Bruno Hofmann	Norton		12									**0**
=	(Italy) Benedetto Zambotti	Gilera								12			**0**
61	(Netherlands) Anton Elbersen	BMW				13							**0**
=	(Sweden) Sven-Olov Gunnarsson	Norton									13		0
=	(Northern Ireland) Tommy Holmes	Matchless							13				0
=	(Italy) Emanuele Maugliani	Gilera								13			**0**
=	(East Germany) Johannes Müller	Norton						13					**0**
=	(Belgium) Jules Nies	Norton					13						**0**
67	(Netherlands) Joop Vegelzang	Norton				14					15		**0**
68	(Sweden) Bror-Erland Carlsson	Matchless / AJS		Ret							14		**0**
69	(Socialist Federal Republic of Yugoslavia) Alfonz Breznik	Gilera								14			**0**
=	(Northern Ireland) Jimmy Jones	Norton							14				**0**
71	(Northern Ireland) John Brown	Norton							15				**0**
=	(United Kingdom) Anthony Horton	Norton					15						**0**
=	(United Kingdom) Brian Setchell	Norton			15								**0**
74	(Northern Ireland) Campbell Donaghy	BSA							16				**0**
=	(United Kingdom) Derek Powell	Matchless			16								**0**
76	(Northern Ireland) Martin Brosnan	Norton							17				**0**
=	(United Kingdom) Bill Smith	Matchless			17								**0**
78	(United Kingdom) Dennis Craig	Matchless			37				18				**0**
79	(United Kingdom) George Catlin	Matchless			19								**0**
80	(Northern Ireland) Billy McCosh	Matchless			22								**0**
81	(United Kingdom) Monty Buxton	Norton			23								**0**
82	(United Kingdom) Don Chapman	Norton			24				Ret				**0**
83	(United Kingdom) Mike O'Rourke	Norton			25								**0**
84	(Republic of Ireland) George Purvis	Matchless			26								**0**
85	(United Kingdom) Arthur Wheeler	Matchless			27								**0**
86	(United Kingdom) Harold Riley	BSA			28								**0**
87	(United Kingdom) Den Jarman	AJS			29								**0**
88	(United Kingdom) Derek Minter	Norton			30								**0**
89	(United Kingdom) Louis Carr	Norton			31								**0**
90	(United Kingdom) Alan Dugdale	Matchless			32								**0**
91	(United Kingdom) Ronald Cousins	Norton			33								**0**
92	(United Kingdom) Geoff Eccles	BSA			34								**0**
93	(Canada) Dave Wildman	AJS			35								**0**
94	(Sweden) Billy Andersson	AJS			36								**0**
95	(United Kingdom) Albert Moule	Norton			39								**0**
96	(United Kingdom) Bill Robertson	AJS			40								**0**
97	(United Kingdom) John Simmonds	Matchless			42								**0**
98	(United Kingdom) Maurice Gittins	Norton			43								**0**
-	(New Zealand) Hugh Anderson	Norton			Ret				Ret	Ret			**0**
-	(United Kingdom) John Hartle	Norton					Ret		Ret	Ret			**0**
-	(Federation of Rhodesia and Nyasaland) William Van Leeuwen	Norton				Ret		Ret			Ret		**0**
-	(Germany) Hans Pesl	Norton	Ret	Ret									**0**
-	(United Kingdom) Chris Anderson	Norton			Ret								**0**
-	(United Kingdom) R. Bennett	Norton			Ret								**0**
-	(United Kingdom) Richard Brinnand	Norton			Ret								**0**
-	(Northern Ireland) Ralph Bryans	Norton							Ret				**0**
-	(United Kingdom) Roly Capner	BSA			Ret								**0**
-	(United States) Fred Chase	Norton			Ret								**0**
-	(Italy) Artemio Cirelli	Gilera								Ret			**0**
-	(Italy) Gianfranco Demeniconi	Norton								Ret			**0**
-	(United Kingdom) Graham Downes	Matchless			Ret								**0**
-	(United Kingdom) Peter Evans	Matchless			Ret								**0**
-	(United Kingdom) Harry Grant	BSA			Ret								**0**
-	(Germany) Alois Huber	BMW	Ret										**0**
-	(Northern Ireland) Len Ireland	Norton			Ret								**0**
-	(France) Pierre James	Norton		Ret									**0**
-	(Italy) Vasco Loro	Norton								Ret			**0**
-	(Italy) Giuseppe Mantelli	Gilera								Ret			**0**
-	(United Kingdom) Peter Middleton	Norton			Ret								**0**
-	(Italy) Gilberto Milani	Norton			Ret								**0**
-	(United Kingdom) George Northwood	Norton			Ret								**0**
-	(Germany) Karl Recktenwald	Norton	Ret										**0**
-	(United Kingdom) Ralph Rensen	Norton	Ret										**0**
-	(Austria) Ladislaus Richter	Norton			Ret								**0**
-	(Italy) Renzo Rossi	Gilera								Ret			**0**
-	(United Kingdom) Derek Russell	Norton			Ret								**0**
-	(Germany) Walter Scheimann	Norton			Ret								**0**
-	(United Kingdom) Douglas Smith	Matchless			Ret								**0**
-	(Australia) Graham Smith	Norton			Ret								**0**
-	(United Kingdom) Lewis Young	Norton			Ret								**0**
Pos	Rider	Bike	GER (Germany)	FRA (France)	MAN (United Kingdom)	HOL (Netherlands)	BEL (Belgium)	DDR (East Germany)	ULS (Ulster)	NAC (Italy)	SWE (Sweden)	ARG (Argentina)	Pts

Colour	Result
Gold	Winner
Silver	Second place
Bronze	Third place
Green	Points classification
Blue	Non-points classification
Blue	Non-classified finish (NC)
Purple	Retired, not classified (Ret)
Red	Did not qualify (DNQ)
Red	Did not pre-qualify (DNPQ)
Black	Disqualified (DSQ)
White	Did not start (DNS)
White	Withdrew (WD)
White	Race cancelled (C)
Blank	Did not practice (DNP)
Blank	Did not arrive (DNA)
Blank	Excluded (EX)

**Bold** – Pole
Italics – Fastest Lap

=== 350cc Standings ===
Place	Rider	Number	Country	Machine	Points	Wins
1	(Federation of Rhodesia and Nyasaland) Gary Hocking		Rhodesia	MV Agusta	32	4
2	(Czechoslovakia) František Šťastný		Czechoslovakia	Jawa	26	2
3	(Czechoslovakia) Gustav Havel		Czechoslovakia	Jawa	19	0
4	(United Kingdom) Phil Read		United Kingdom	Norton	13	1
5	(United Kingdom) Bob McIntyre		United Kingdom	Bianchi	10	0
6	(Austria) Rudi Thalhammer		Austria	Norton	7	0
=	(United Kingdom) Ralph Rensen		United Kingdom	Norton	7	0
8	(United Kingdom) Alistair King		United Kingdom	Bianchi	6	0
=	(United Kingdom) Mike Hailwood		United Kingdom	MV Agusta	6	0
10	(Italy) Ernesto Brambilla		Italy	Bianchi	5	0
=	(United Kingdom) Alan Shepherd		United Kingdom	AJS	5	0
12	(United Kingdom) Tommy Robb		United Kingdom	AJS	4	0
13	(United Kingdom) Derek Minter		United Kingdom	Norton	3	0
14	(West Germany) Hans Pesl		West Germany	Norton	2	0
=	(Italy) Silvio Grassetti		Italy	Benelli	2	0
=	(United Kingdom) Ron Langston		United Kingdom	AJS	2	0
17	(United Kingdom) Frank Perris		United Kingdom	Norton	2	0
=	(Canada) Mike Duff		Canada	AJS	2	0
19	(United Kingdom) Roy Ingram		United Kingdom	Norton	1	0
=	(Austria) Bert Schneider		Austria	Norton	1	0
=	(New Zealand) Hugh Anderson		New Zealand	Norton	1	0

=== 250cc Standings ===
Place	Rider	Number	Country	Machine	Points	Wins
1	(United Kingdom) Mike Hailwood		United Kingdom	Honda	44	4
2	(Australia) Tom Phillis		Australia	Honda	38	2
3	(Federation of Rhodesia and Nyasaland) Jim Redman		Rhodesia	Honda	36	2
4	(Japan) Kunimitsu Takahashi		Japan	Honda	29	1
5	(United Kingdom) Bob McIntyre		United Kingdom	Honda	14	1
6	(Italy) Tarquinio Provini		Italy	Morini	10	0
7	(Italy) Silvio Grassetti		Italy	Benelli	10	0
8	(Federation of Rhodesia and Nyasaland) Gary Hocking		Rhodesia	MV Agusta	8	1
9	(Japan) Fumio Ito		Japan	Yamaha	7	0
10	(Switzerland) Luigi Taveri		Switzerland	Honda	6	0
11	(United Kingdom) Alan Shepherd		United Kingdom	MZ	6	0
=	(Czechoslovakia) František Šťastný		Czechoslovakia	Jawa	6	0
13	(East Germany) Ernst Degner		East Germany	MZ	3	0
=	(Japan) Sadao Shimazaki		Japan	Honda	3	0
15	(East Germany) Hans Fischer		East Germany	MZ	3	0
16	(Japan) Naomi Taniguchi		Japan	Honda	2	0
17	(United Kingdom) Dan Shorey		United Kingdom	NSU	1	0
=	(Japan) Yoshikazu Sunako		Japan	Yamaha	1	0
=	(East Germany) Werner Musiol		East Germany	MZ	1	0

=== 125cc ===
==== Riders' standings ====
Pos.	Rider	Bike	ESP (Spain)	FRG (West Germany)	FRA (France)	MAN (Isle of Man)	NED (Netherlands)	BEL (Belgium)	GDR (East Germany)	ULS (Northern Ireland)	NAT (Italy)	SWE (Sweden)	ARG (Argentina)	Pts
1	(Australia) Tom Phillis	Honda	1		1**^{F}**	3	1**^{F}**	2**^{F}**	2	3**^{F}**	4**^{F}**	6	1**^{F}**	44 (56)
2	(East Germany) Ernst Degner	MZ	2	1**^{F}**	2**^{F}**			4	1	2	1			42 (45)
3	(Switzerland) Luigi Taveri	Honda		5	5	2**^{F}**		1	DSQ	6	3	1**^{F}**		30 (31)
4	(Federation of Rhodesia and Nyasaland) Jim Redman	Honda	3		3	4	2	3	6	4	5	3	2	28 (37)
5	(Japan) Kunimitsu Takahashi	Honda		6	6				3**^{F}**	1		2	3	24
6	(United Kingdom) Mike Hailwood	EMC	4**^{F}**		4									16
6	(United Kingdom) Mike Hailwood	Honda				1				5				16
7	(United Kingdom) Alan Shepherd	MZ		2			3	5						12
8	(East Germany) Walter Brehme	MZ		3				6	5					7
9	(Japan) Teisuke Tanaka	Honda									2			6
10	(East Germany) Werner Musiol	MZ					5					4		5
10	(Japan) Sadao Shimazaki	Honda				5							4	5
12	(East Germany) Hans Fischer	MZ		4										3
12	(United Kingdom) Phil Read	EMC					4							3
12	(Hungary) László Szabó	MZ							4					3
15	(United Kingdom) John Grace	Bultaco	5											2
15	(Sweden) Ulf Svensson	Ducati										5		2
15	(Japan) Naomi Taniguchi	Honda											5	2
18	(United Kingdom) Rex Avery	EMC					6				6			2
19	(Spain) Ricardo Quintanilla	Bultaco	6											1
19	(United Kingdom) Ralph Rensen	Bultaco				6								1
19	(Argentina) Héctor Pochettino	Bultaco											6	1
Pos.	Rider	Bike	ESP (Spain)	FRG (West Germany)	FRA (France)	MAN (Isle of Man)	NED (Netherlands)	BEL (Belgium)	GDR (East Germany)	ULS (Northern Ireland)	NAT (Italy)	SWE (Sweden)	ARG (Argentina)	Pts

Race key
Colour	Result
Gold	Winner
Silver	2nd place
Bronze	3rd place
Green	Points finish
Blue	Non-points finish
Blue	Non-classified finish (NC)
Purple	Retired (Ret)
Red	Did not qualify (DNQ)
Black	Disqualified (DSQ)
White	Did not start (DNS)
White	Withdrew (WD)
White	Race cancelled (C)
Blank	Did not practice (DNP)
Blank	Excluded (EX)
Blank	Did not arrive (DNA)
Blank	Did not enter (empty cell)
Annotation	Meaning
P	Pole position
F	Fastest lap
Rider key
Colour	Meaning
Light blue	Rookie rider

==== Constructors' standings ====
Each constructor is awarded the same number of points as their best placed rider in each race.

Pos.	Constructor	ESP (Spain)	FRG (West Germany)	FRA (France)	MAN (Isle of Man)	NED (Netherlands)	BEL (Belgium)	GDR (East Germany)	ULS (Northern Ireland)	NAT (Italy)	SWE (Sweden)	ARG (Argentina)	Pts
1	(Japan) Honda	1	5	1	1	1	1	2	1	2	1	1	48 (78)
2	(East Germany) MZ	2	1	2		3	4	1	2	1	4		42 (52)
3	(United Kingdom) EMC	4		4		4				6			10
4	(Spain) Bultaco	5			6							6	4
5	(Italy) Ducati										5		2
Pos.	Constructor	ESP (Spain)	FRG (West Germany)	FRA (France)	MAN (Isle of Man)	NED (Netherlands)	BEL (Belgium)	GDR (East Germany)	ULS (Northern Ireland)	NAT (Italy)	SWE (Sweden)	ARG (Argentina)	Pts
