= 1961 Isle of Man TT =

Annual motorcycle racing event

The 1961 Isle of Man TT races, the fourth round of the 1961 Grand Prix motorcycle racing season, involved five races on the Isle of Man TT Mountain Course on the Isle of Man. Three of the races were won by Mike Hailwood. He completed the six laps of the course in 2 hours, 15 minutes and 2.0 seconds at an average race speed of 100.61 mph to win the Senior TT race, after earlier winning the Ultra-Lightweight 125cc and Lightweight 250cc races Phil Read won the 350cc Junior TT race, while Max Deubel and E.Hoerner won the Sidecar TT event.

== 1961 Isle of Man Lightweight TT 125cc final standings ==
3 Laps (113.00 Miles) Mountain Course.

Place	Rider	Number	Country	Machine	Speed	Time	Points
1	(United Kingdom) Mike Hailwood		United Kingdom	Honda	88.23 mph	1:16.58.6	8
2	(Switzerland) Luigi Taveri		Switzerland	Honda	88.09 mph	1:17.06.0	6
3	(Australia) Tom Phillis		Australia	Honda	87.28 mph	1:17.49.0	4
4	(Federation of Rhodesia and Nyasaland) Jim Redman		Rhodesia	Honda	84.83 mph	1:20.04.2	3
5	(Japan) Sadao Shimazaki		Japan	Honda	84.80 mph	1:20.06.0	2
6	(United Kingdom) Ralph Rensen		United Kingdom	Bultaco	83.26 mph	1:21.35.2	1

== 1961 Sidecar TT final standings ==
3 Laps (113.00 Miles) Mountain Course.

Place	Rider	Number	Country	Machine	Speed	Time	Points
1	(West Germany) Max Deubel/E.Hoerner	3	West Germany	BMW	87.65 mph	1:17.29.8	8
2	(Switzerland) Fritz Scheidegger/H.Burkhardt	2	Switzerland	BMW	87.03 mph	1:18.02.6	6
3	(United Kingdom) Pip Harris/R.V.Campbell	8	United Kingdom	BMW	85.26 mph	1:19.40.4	4
4	(West Germany) A.Rohseipe/L.Bottcher	12	West Germany	Norton	79.60 mph	1:25.19.8	3
5	(United Kingdom) Charlie Freeman/B.Nelson	2	United Kingdom	Norton	78.82 mph	1:26.10.6	2
6	(United Kingdom) Colin Seeley/W.Rawlings	35	United Kingdom	Matchless	77.93 mph	1:27.09.8	1

== 1961 Isle of Man Lightweight TT 250cc final standings ==
5 Laps (188.65 Miles) Mountain Course.

Place	Rider	Number	Country	Machine	Speed	Time	Points
1	(United Kingdom) Mike Hailwood		United Kingdom	Honda	98.38 mph	1:55.03.6	8
2	(Australia) Tom Phillis		Australia	Honda	96.56 mph	1:57.14.2	6
3	(Federation of Rhodesia and Nyasaland) Jim Redman		Rhodesia	Honda	93.09 mph	2:01.36.2	4
4	(Japan) Kunimitsu Takahashi		Japan	Honda	92.25 mph	2:02.43.2	3
5	(Japan) Naomi Taniguchi		Japan	Honda	88.90 mph	2:07.20.0	2
6	(Japan) Fumio Ito		Japan	Yamaha	87.88 mph	2:08.49.0	1

== 1961 Isle of Man Junior TT 350cc final standings ==
6 Laps (236.38 Miles) Mountain Course.

Place	Rider	Number	Country	Machine	Speed	Time	Points
1	(United Kingdom) Phil Read		United Kingdom	Norton	95.11 mph	2:22.50.0	8
2	(Federation of Rhodesia and Nyasaland) Gary Hocking		Rhodesia	MV Agusta	94.25 mph	2:24.07.8	6
3	(United Kingdom) Ralph Rensen		United Kingdom	Norton	93.65 mph	2:25.03.0	4
4	(United Kingdom) Derek Minter		United Kingdom	Norton	93.50 mph	2:25.16.8	3
5	(Czechoslovakia) František Šťastný		Czechoslovakia	Jawa	93.15 mph	2:25.50.2	2
6	(United Kingdom) Roy Ingham		United Kingdom	Norton	92.97 mph	2:26.07.0	1

== 1961 Isle of Man Senior TT 500cc final standings ==
6 Laps (236.38 Miles) Mountain Course.

Place	Rider	Number	Country	Machine	Speed	Time	Points
1	(United Kingdom) Mike Hailwood		United Kingdom	Norton	100.61 mph	2:15.02.0	8
2	(Scotland) Bob McIntyre		United Kingdom	Norton	99.20 mph	2:16.54.4	6
3	(Australia) Tom Phillis		Australia	Norton	98.78 mph	2:17.31.2	4
4	(Scotland) Alistair King		United Kingdom	Norton	97.73 mph	2:18.59.8	3
5	(United Kingdom) Ron Langston		United Kingdom	Norton	97.52 mph	2:19.17.6	2
6	(United Kingdom) Tony Godfrey		United Kingdom	Norton	96.82 mph	2:22.18.0	1
