= Swedish motorcycle Grand Prix =

Motorcycle competition held in Sweden

Coordinates: 57°15′55″N 13°36′15″E

Swedish Grand Prix

Grand Prix motorcycle racing
- Venue: Scandinavian Raceway (1971–1977, 1981–1990); Karlskoga Motorstadion (1978–1979); Råbelövsbanan (1959, 1961); Hedemora Circuit (1958)
- First race: 1958
- Last race: 1990
- Most wins (rider): Barry Sheene (7)
- Most wins (manufacturer): Yamaha (17)

The Swedish motorcycle Grand Prix was a motorcycling event that was part of the Grand Prix motorcycle racing season in various stints from 1958 to 1990.

== Formerly used circuits ==
Anderstorp, used in 1968–1977 with a different layout

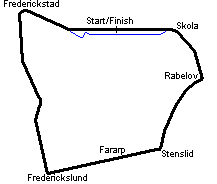
Råbelövsbanan, used in 1959 and 1961

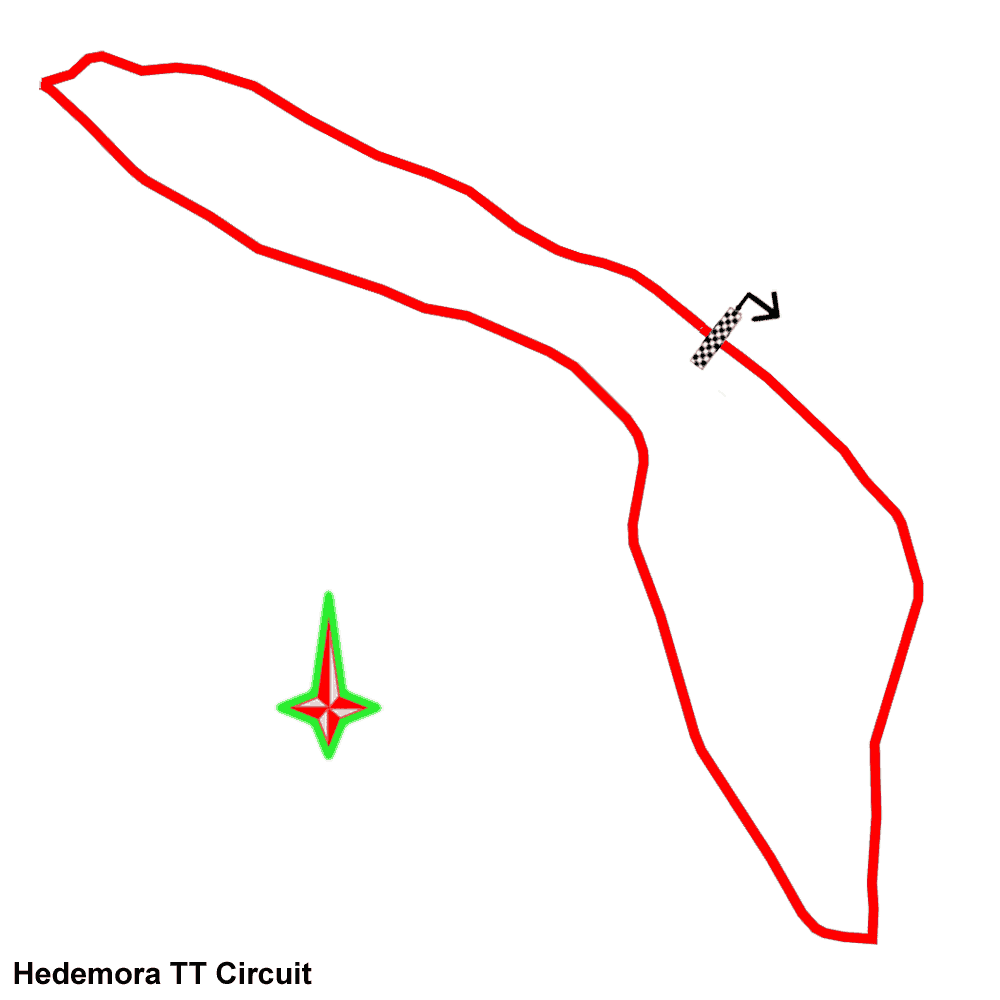
Hedemora, used in 1958

== Official names and sponsors ==
- 1971–1972: Sveriges Grand Prix för motorcyklar (no official sponsor)
- 1973–1974, 1976–1977, 1981–1989: Swedish TT (no official sponsor)
- 1975: Pommac Swedish TT
- 1978: Sveriges Grand Prix (no official sponsor)
- 1979: Grand Prix of Sweden (no official sponsor)
- 1990: Nordic TT (no official sponsor)

== Winners ==
=== Multiple winners (riders) ===
# Wins	Rider	Wins	
# Wins	Rider	Category	Years won
7	(United Kingdom) Barry Sheene	500cc	1975, 1976, 1977, 1978, 1979, 1981
7	(United Kingdom) Barry Sheene	125cc	1971
4	(Italy) Giacomo Agostini	500cc	1971, 1972
4	(Italy) Giacomo Agostini	350cc	1971, 1972
4	(Spain) Ángel Nieto	125cc	1972, 1977
4	(Spain) Ángel Nieto	50cc	1971, 1976
4	(Japan) Takazumi Katayama	500cc	1982
4	(Japan) Takazumi Katayama	350cc	1977
4	(Japan) Takazumi Katayama	250cc	1974, 1976
4	(United States) Eddie Lawson	500cc	1984, 1986, 1988, 1989
3	(Finland) Teuvo Länsivuori	500cc	1974
3	(Finland) Teuvo Länsivuori	350cc	1973, 1974
3	(Italy) Pier Paolo Bianchi	125cc	1976, 1978, 1979
3	(West Germany) Anton Mang	250cc	1981, 1985, 1987
3	(Italy) Fausto Gresini	125cc	1984, 1986, 1987
2	(United Kingdom) Geoff Duke	500cc	1958
2	(United Kingdom) Geoff Duke	350cc	1958
2	(Federation of Rhodesia and Nyasaland) Gary Hocking	500cc	1961
2	(Federation of Rhodesia and Nyasaland) Gary Hocking	250cc	1959
2	(United Kingdom) Rodney Gould	250cc	1971, 1972
2	(Netherlands) Jan de Vries	50cc	1972, 1973
2	(Australia) Gregg Hansford	350cc	1978
2	(Australia) Gregg Hansford	250cc	1978
2	(Spain) Ricardo Tormo	125cc	1981
2	(Spain) Ricardo Tormo	50cc	1977
2	(United States) Freddie Spencer	500cc	1983, 1985
2	(Spain) Sito Pons	250cc	1988, 1989

=== Multiple winners (manufacturers) ===
# Wins	Manufacturer	Wins	
# Wins	Manufacturer	Category	Years won
17	(Japan) Yamaha	500cc	1974, 1981, 1984, 1986, 1988, 1990
17	(Japan) Yamaha	350cc	1973, 1974, 1977
17	(Japan) Yamaha	250cc	1971, 1972, 1973, 1974, 1976, 1983, 1986
17	(Japan) Yamaha	125cc	1974
13	(Japan) Honda	500cc	1982, 1983, 1985, 1987, 1989
13	(Japan) Honda	250cc	1961, 1985, 1987, 1988, 1989, 1990
13	(Japan) Honda	125cc	1961, 1990
8	(Italy) MV Agusta	500cc	1961, 1971, 1972, 1973
8	(Italy) MV Agusta	350cc	1959, 1971, 1972
8	(Italy) MV Agusta	125cc	1959
7	(Italy) Morbidelli	250cc	1979, 1982
7	(Italy) Morbidelli	125cc	1975, 1976, 1982, 1983, 1984
6	(Japan) Suzuki	500cc	1975, 1976, 1977, 1978, 1979
6	(Japan) Suzuki	125cc	1971
4	(Japan) Kawasaki	350cc	1978
4	(Japan) Kawasaki	250cc	1977, 1978, 1981
3	(Spain) Bultaco	125cc	1977
3	(Spain) Bultaco	50cc	1976, 1977
3	(Spain) Derbi	125cc	1972, 1988
3	(Spain) Derbi	50cc	1971
2	(United Kingdom) Norton	500cc	1958
2	(United Kingdom) Norton	350cc	1958
2	(East Germany) MZ	250cc	1958, 1959
2	(West Germany) Kreidler	50cc	1972, 1973
2	(Italy) Minarelli	125cc	1978, 1979
2	(Italy) Garelli	125cc	1986, 1987

=== By year ===
Year	Track	125cc		250cc		500cc		Report
Year	Track	Rider	Manufacturer	Rider	Manufacturer	Rider	Manufacturer	Report
1990	Anderstorp	(Netherlands) Hans Spaan	Honda	(Spain) Carlos Cardús	Honda	(United States) Wayne Rainey	Yamaha	Report

Year	Track	80cc		125cc		250cc		500cc		Report
Year	Track	Rider	Manufacturer	Rider	Manufacturer	Rider	Manufacturer	Rider	Manufacturer	Report
1989	Anderstorp			(Spain) Àlex Crivillé	JJ Cobas	(Spain) Sito Pons	Honda	(United States) Eddie Lawson	Honda	Report
1988	Anderstorp			(Spain) Jorge Martínez	Derbi	(Spain) Sito Pons	Honda	(United States) Eddie Lawson	Yamaha	Report
1987	Anderstorp			(Italy) Fausto Gresini	Garelli	(West Germany) Anton Mang	Honda	(Australia) Wayne Gardner	Honda	Report
1986	Anderstorp			(Italy) Fausto Gresini	Garelli	(Venezuela) Carlos Lavado	Yamaha	(United States) Eddie Lawson	Yamaha	Report
1985	Anderstorp			(Austria) August Auinger	Monnet	(West Germany) Anton Mang	Honda	(United States) Freddie Spencer	Honda	Report
1984	Anderstorp			(Italy) Fausto Gresini	MBA	(West Germany) Manfred Herweh	Real-Rotax	(United States) Eddie Lawson	Yamaha	Report
Year	Track	50cc		125cc		250cc		500cc		Report
Year	Track	Rider	Manufacturer	Rider	Manufacturer	Rider	Manufacturer	Rider	Manufacturer	Report
1983	Anderstorp			(Switzerland) Bruno Kneubühler	MBA	(France) Christian Sarron	Yamaha	(United States) Freddie Spencer	Honda	Report

Year	Track	50cc		125cc		250cc		350cc		500cc		Report
Year	Track	Rider	Manufacturer	Rider	Manufacturer	Rider	Manufacturer	Rider	Manufacturer	Rider	Manufacturer	Report
1982	Anderstorp			(Venezuela) Iván Palazzese	MBA	(Switzerland) Roland Freymond	MBA			(Japan) Takazumi Katayama	Honda	Report
1981	Anderstorp			(Spain) Ricardo Tormo	Sanvenero	(West Germany) Anton Mang	Kawasaki			(United Kingdom) Barry Sheene	Yamaha	Report
1979	Karlskoga			(Italy) Pier Paolo Bianchi	Minarelli	(Italy) Graziano Rossi	Morbidelli			(United Kingdom) Barry Sheene	Suzuki	Report
1978	Karlskoga			(Italy) Pier Paolo Bianchi	Minarelli	(Australia) Gregg Hansford	Kawasaki	(Australia) Gregg Hansford	Kawasaki	(United Kingdom) Barry Sheene	Suzuki	Report
1977	Anderstorp	(Spain) Ricardo Tormo	Bultaco	(Spain) Ángel Nieto	Bultaco	(United Kingdom) Mick Grant	Kawasaki	(Japan) Takazumi Katayama	Yamaha	(United Kingdom) Barry Sheene	Suzuki	Report
1976	Anderstorp	(Spain) Ángel Nieto	Bultaco	(Italy) Pier Paolo Bianchi	Morbidelli	(Japan) Takazumi Katayama	Yamaha			(United Kingdom) Barry Sheene	Suzuki	Report
1975	Anderstorp	(Italy) Eugenio Lazzarini	Piovaticci	(Italy) Paolo Pileri	Morbidelli	(Italy) Walter Villa	Harley-Davidson			(United Kingdom) Barry Sheene	Suzuki	Report
1974	Anderstorp	(Netherlands) Henk van Kessel	Van Veen Kreidler	(Sweden) Kent Andersson	Yamaha	(Japan) Takazumi Katayama	Yamaha	(Finland) Teuvo Länsivuori	Yamaha	(Finland) Teuvo Länsivuori	Yamaha	Report
1973	Anderstorp	(Netherlands) Jan de Vries	Kreidler	(Sweden) Börje Jansson	Maico	(West Germany) Dieter Braun	Yamaha	(Finland) Teuvo Länsivuori	Yamaha	(United Kingdom) Phil Read	MV Agusta	Report
1972	Anderstorp	(Netherlands) Jan de Vries	Kreidler	(Spain) Ángel Nieto	Derbi	(United Kingdom) Rod Gould	Yamaha	(Italy) Giacomo Agostini	MV Agusta	(Italy) Giacomo Agostini	MV Agusta	Report
1971	Anderstorp	(Spain) Ángel Nieto	Derbi	(United Kingdom) Barry Sheene	Suzuki	(United Kingdom) Rod Gould	Yamaha	(Italy) Giacomo Agostini	MV Agusta	(Italy) Giacomo Agostini	MV Agusta	Report
Year	Track			125cc		250cc		350cc		500cc		Report
Year	Track			Rider	Manufacturer	Rider	Manufacturer	Rider	Manufacturer	Rider	Manufacturer	Report
1961	Kristianstad			(Switzerland) Luigi Taveri	Honda	(United Kingdom) Mike Hailwood	Honda	(Czechoslovakia) František Šťastný	Jawa	(Federation of Rhodesia and Nyasaland) Gary Hocking	MV Agusta	Report
1959	Kristianstad			(Italy) Tarquinio Provini	MV Agusta	(Federation of Rhodesia and Nyasaland) Gary Hocking	MZ	(United Kingdom) John Surtees	MV Agusta			Report
1958	Hedemora			(Italy) Alberto Gandossi	Ducati	(East Germany) Horst Fügner	MZ	(United Kingdom) Geoff Duke	Norton	(United Kingdom) Geoff Duke	Norton	Report
