= Hedemora =

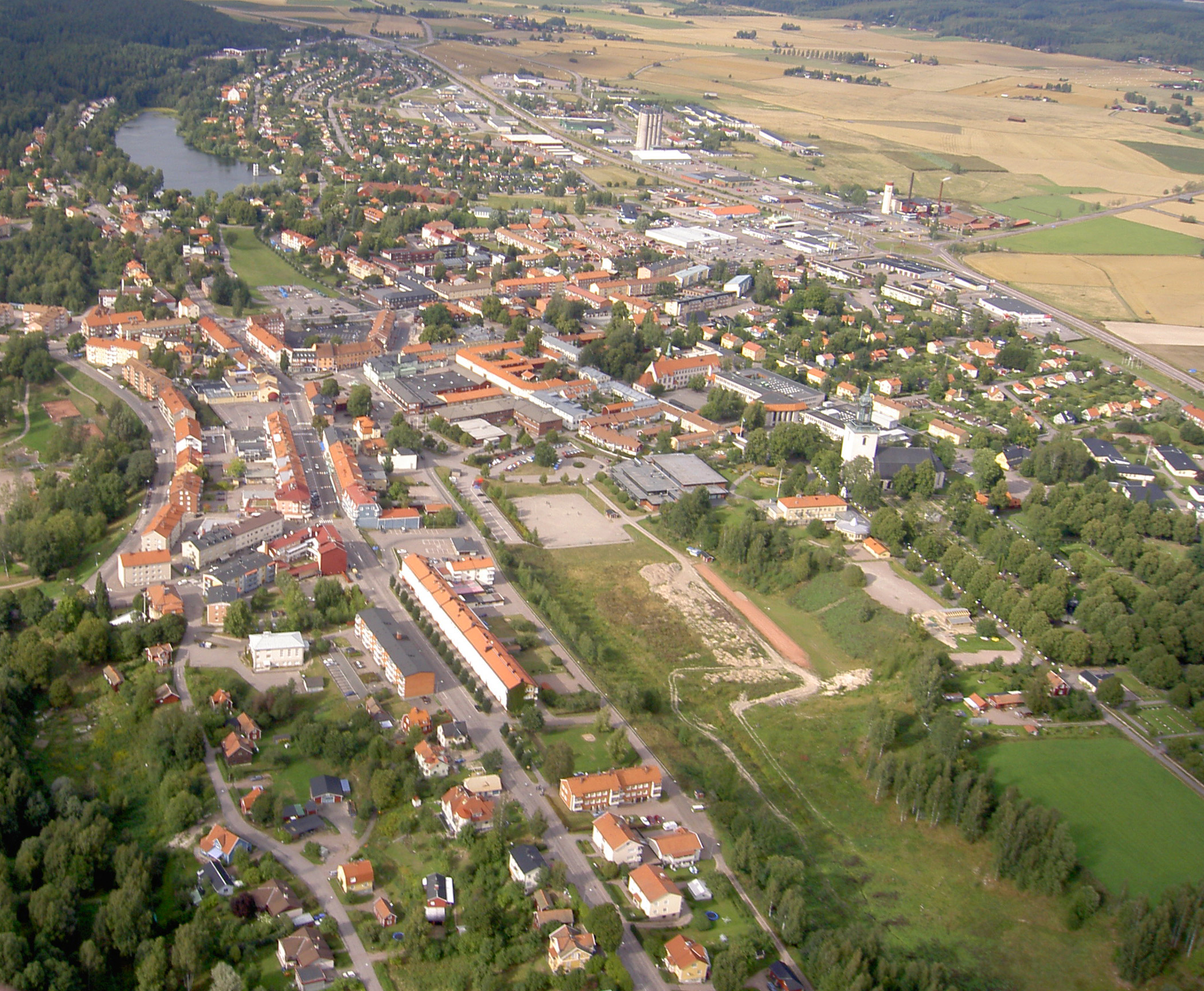
- September 2007 aerial view of Hedemora

- Location within Dalarna Location within Sweden
- Coordinates: 60°16′37″N 15°59′14″E
- Country: Sweden
- Province: Dalarna
- County: Dalarna County
- Municipality: Hedemora Municipality

Area
  - Total: 6.12 km^{2} (2.36 sq mi)

Population (31 December 2010)
  - Total: 7,273
  - Density: 1,189/km^{2} (3,080/sq mi)
- Time zone: UTC+1 (CET)
  - Summer (DST): UTC+2 (CEST)

Hedemora is a town in Dalarna County and the seat of Hedemora Municipality, Sweden, with 7,273 inhabitants in 2010.

Despite its small population, Hedemora is for historical reasons normally still referred to as a city, and as such the oldest in the county.

Jonas Nilsson comes from Hedemora, as well as Kerstin Thorborg, Martin Matsbo, Edvin Anger, Bertil Norman and Ulf Stenlund. The diesel engines from Hedemora Diesel can be found in many ships built by Kockums, such as HSwMS Orion, the Collins class submarines in the Royal Australian Navy Submarine Service and the Archer class submarines in the Republic of Singapore Navy.

Hedemora is the home of Clifftop Games, an independent game developer whose published works include Kathy Rain and Whispers of a Machine, and also of Killmonday Games, the independent game developer that produced the games Fran Bow and Little Misfortune.

== History ==
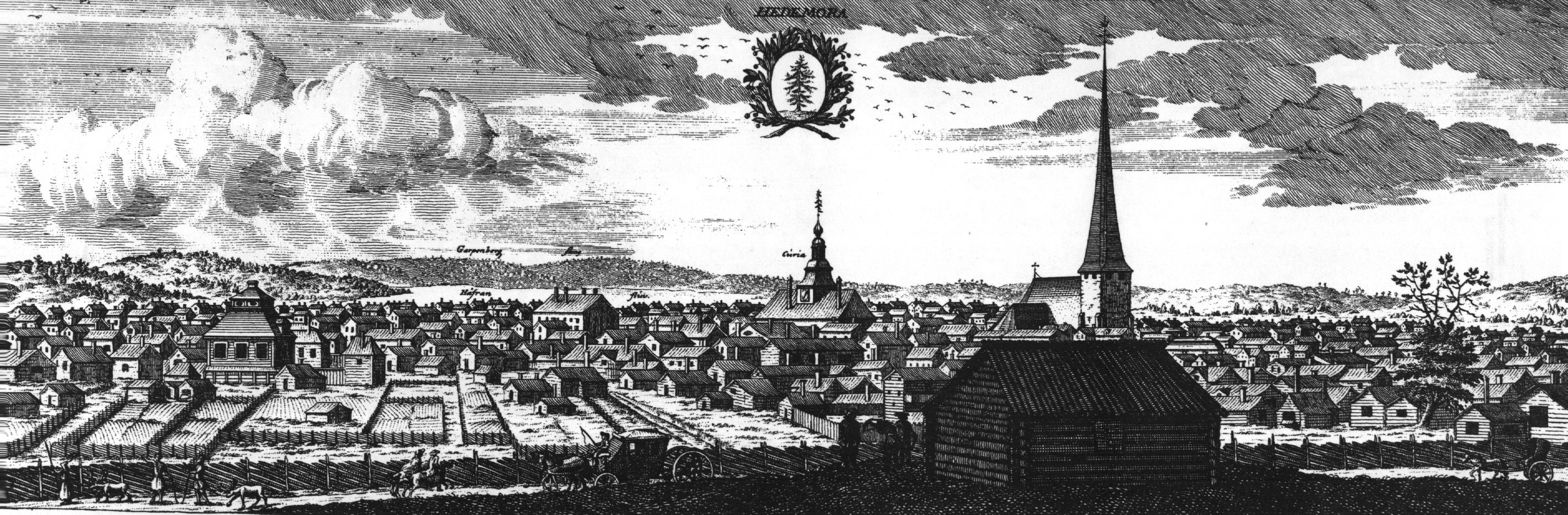
Hedemora around 1700, in the work Suecia antiqua et hodierna.

The town Hedemora was chartered in 1446, which means it is the oldest and only medieval town in Dalarna.

In 1754 and 1849 the town was severely hit by fire. The fire in 1754 destroyed 90 out of the 110 house lots in the town, including all the grain storages. However, the massive destruction made it possible to modernize the town structure, with straighter blocks and streets.

Hedemora held Gustav I of Sweden's first mint, in use 1521–1524.

In 1958, a motor racing circuit laid out in the city hosted the first Swedish motorcycle Grand Prix of MotoGP.

== See also ==
- Hedemora gammelgård
- Mas (Swedish term)
- Old pharmacy of Hedemora
- Hedemora stadshotell
- Järnhandelns hus
