= List of Grand Prix motorcycle circuits =

This is a list of circuits which have hosted a World Championship race from 1949 to 2026.

In total, 76 different circuits have hosted World Championship races. The first to do so was the Snaefell Mountain Course, home of the Isle of Man TT, which also has the distinction, at 60.718 km (37.728 mi) long, of being the longest track which hosted a World Championship race. The TT Circuit Assen has the distinction of holding the most races, holding a Grand Prix every year (with the exception of 2020) since 1949, followed by the Brno Circuit.

Various different forms of race track have been used throughout the history of the World Championship; purpose-built race tracks such as Suzuka, road tracks such as Spa-Francorchamps, and city street tracks such as Montjuïc.

== List of circuits ==
Key
✔	Current circuits (for the 2026 season)	*	Future circuits (for the 2027 seasons)

- The "Map" column shows a diagram of the latest configuration on current tracks and the last configuration used on past tracks.
- The "Type" column refers to the type of circuit: "street" is a circuit held on closed city streets, "road" refers to a mixture of public roads and a permanent track, and "race" is a permanent facility.

Circuit	Type	Direction	Location	Race(s)	Season(s)	Total by GP	Total	Map
Adelaide Street Circuit *	street circuit	Clockwise	Adelaide	(Australia) Australian Grand Prix		0		
Algarve International Circuit ✔	race circuit	Clockwise	Portimão	(Portugal) Portuguese Grand Prix	2020–2026	7	8	Algarve
Algarve International Circuit ✔	race circuit	Clockwise	Portimão	(Portugal) Algarve Grand Prix	2021	1	8	Algarve
Autodromo Enzo e Dino Ferrari	race circuit	Anti-clockwise	Imola	(Italy) Italian Grand Prix	1969, 1972, 1974–1975, 1977, 1979, 1988	7	13	Imola
Autodromo Enzo e Dino Ferrari	race circuit	Anti-clockwise	Imola	San Marino Grand Prix	1981, 1983	2	13	Imola
Autodromo Enzo e Dino Ferrari	race circuit	Anti-clockwise	Imola	(Bologna) City of Imola Grand Prix	1996–1999	4	13	Imola
Autódromo Internacional Ayrton Senna ✔	race circuit	Clockwise	Goiânia	(Brazil) Brazilian Grand Prix	1987–1989, 2026	4		Goiânia
Autódromo Internacional Nelson Piquet	race circuit	Anti-clockwise	Rio de Janeiro	(Rio de Janeiro (state)) Rio de Janeiro Grand Prix	1995–1997, 1999–2004	9		Jacarepaguá
Autodromo Internazionale del Mugello ✔	race circuit	Clockwise	Scarperia e San Piero	(Italy) Italian Grand Prix	1976, 1978, 1985, 1992, 1994–2019, 2021–2026	36	40	Mugello
Autodromo Internazionale del Mugello ✔	race circuit	Clockwise	Scarperia e San Piero	San Marino Grand Prix	1982, 1984, 1991, 1993	4	40	Mugello
Autódromo José Carlos Pace	race circuit	Anti-clockwise	São Paulo	(Brazil) Brazilian Grand Prix	1992	1		Interlagos
Autodromo Nazionale di Monza	race circuit	Clockwise	Monza	(Italy) Italian Grand Prix	1949–1968, 1970–1971, 1973, 1981, 1983, 1986–1987	27		Monza
Autódromo Oscar y Juan Gálvez *	race circuit	Clockwise	Buenos Aires	(Argentina) Argentine Grand Prix	1961–1963, 1981–1982, 1987, 1994–1995, 1998–1999	10		Buenos Aires
Autódromo Termas de Río Hondo	race circuit	Clockwise	Termas de Río Hondo	(Argentina) Argentine Grand Prix	2014–2019, 2022–2023, 2025	9		Termas de Río Hondo
Automotodrom Brno ✔	road/race circuit	Clockwise	Brno	(Czechoslovakia) Czechoslovak Grand Prix	1965–1982, 1987–1991	23	53	Brno
Automotodrom Brno ✔	road/race circuit	Clockwise	Brno	(Czech Republic) Czech Grand Prix	1993–2020, 2025–2026	30	53	Brno
Automotodrom Grobnik	race circuit	Anti-clockwise	Čavle	(Socialist Federal Republic of Yugoslavia) Yugoslavian Grand Prix	1978–1990	13		Rijekadun
Balaton Park Circuit ✔	race circuit	Anti-clockwise	Balatonfőkajár	(Hungary) Hungarian Grand Prix	2025–2026	2		
Buddh International Circuit	race circuit	Clockwise	Greater Noida	(India) Indian Grand Prix	2023	1		Buddh
Buriram International Circuit ✔	race circuit	Clockwise	Buriram	Thailand Grand Prix	2018–2019, 2022–2026	7		
Bugatti Circuit ✔	race circuit	Clockwise	Le Mans	(France) French Grand Prix	1969–1970, 1976, 1979, 1983, 1985, 1987, 1989–1990, 1994–1995, 2000–2026	38	39	Bugatti
Bugatti Circuit ✔	race circuit	Clockwise	Le Mans	(Pays de la Loire) Vitesse du Mans Grand Prix	1991	1	39	Bugatti
Circuit Bremgarten	race circuit	Clockwise	Bern	(Switzerland) Swiss Grand Prix	1949, 1951–1954	5		Bremgarten
Circuit de Barcelona-Catalunya ✔	race circuit	Clockwise	Montmeló	(Europe) European Grand Prix	1992–1995	4	36	Barcelona
Circuit de Barcelona-Catalunya ✔	race circuit	Clockwise	Montmeló	(Catalonia) Catalan Grand Prix	1996–2026	31	36	Barcelona
Circuit de Barcelona-Catalunya ✔	race circuit	Clockwise	Montmeló	Solidarity Grand Prix	2024	1	36	Barcelona
Circuit de Charade	road circuit	Clockwise	Saint-Genès-Champanelle	(France) French Grand Prix	1959–1964, 1966–1967, 1972, 1974	10		Charade
Circuit de Nevers Magny-Cours	race circuit	Clockwise	Magny-Cours	(France) French Grand Prix	1992	1		Magny-Cours
Circuit de Spa-Francorchamps	road/race circuit	Clockwise	Stavelot	(Belgium) Belgian Grand Prix	1949–1979, 1981–1986, 1988–1990	40		Spa-Francorchamps
Circuit des Nations	street circuit	Clockwise	Geneva	(Switzerland) Swiss Grand Prix	1950	1		Nations
Circuit Les Planques	road circuit	Clockwise	Albi	(France) French Grand Prix	1951	1		
Circuit of the Americas ✔	race circuit	Anti-clockwise	Austin	(United States) Grand Prix of the Americas	2013–2019, 2021–2025	12	13	Austin
Circuit of the Americas ✔	race circuit	Anti-clockwise	Austin	United States Grand Prix	2026	1	13	Austin
Circuit Paul Armagnac	race circuit	Clockwise	Nogaro	(France) French Grand Prix	1978, 1982	2		Nogaro
Circuit Paul Ricard	race circuit	Clockwise	Le Castellet	(France) French Grand Prix	1973, 1975, 1977, 1980–1981, 1984, 1986, 1988, 1991, 1996–1999	13		Paul Ricard
Circuit Ricardo Tormo ✔	race circuit	Anti-clockwise	Cheste	(Valencian Community) Valencian Grand Prix	1999–2023, 2025	26	27	Valencia
Circuit Ricardo Tormo ✔	race circuit	Anti-clockwise	Cheste	(European Union) European Grand Prix	2020	1	27	Valencia
Circuit Zolder	race circuit	Clockwise	Heusden-Zolder	(Belgium) Belgian Grand Prix	1980	1		Zolder
Circuito de Jerez – Ángel Nieto ✔	race circuit	Clockwise	Jerez de la Frontera	(Spain) Spanish Grand Prix	1987, 1989–2026	39	41	Jerez
Circuito de Jerez – Ángel Nieto ✔	race circuit	Clockwise	Jerez de la Frontera	(Andalusia) Expo 92 Grand Prix	1988	1	41	Jerez
Circuito de Jerez – Ángel Nieto ✔	race circuit	Clockwise	Jerez de la Frontera	(Andalusia) Andalusian Grand Prix	2020	1	41	Jerez
Circuito del Jarama	race circuit	Clockwise	San Sebastián de los Reyes	(Spain) Spanish Grand Prix	1969, 1971, 1973, 1975, 1977–1986, 1988	15	19	Jarama
Circuito del Jarama	race circuit	Clockwise	San Sebastián de los Reyes	(Portugal) Portuguese Grand Prix	1987	1	19	Jarama
Circuito del Jarama	race circuit	Clockwise	San Sebastián de los Reyes	(European Union) European Grand Prix	1991	1	19	Jarama
Circuito del Jarama	race circuit	Clockwise	San Sebastián de los Reyes	FIM Grand Prix	1993	1	19	Jarama
Circuito del Jarama	race circuit	Clockwise	San Sebastián de los Reyes	(Community of Madrid) Madrid Grand Prix	1998	1	19	Jarama
Circuito do Estoril	race circuit	Clockwise	Estoril	(Portugal) Portuguese Grand Prix	2000–2012	13		Estoril
Clady Circuit	road circuit	Clockwise	County Antrim	Ulster Grand Prix	1949–1952	4		County Antrim
Daytona International Speedway	race circuit	Anti-clockwise	Daytona Beach	United States Grand Prix	1964–1965	2		
Donington Park	race circuit	Clockwise	Castle Donington	(United Kingdom) British Grand Prix	1987–2009	23		Donington Park
Dundrod Circuit	road circuit	Clockwise	Lisburn	Ulster Grand Prix	1953–1971	19		Dundrod
Eastern Creek International Raceway	race circuit	Anti-clockwise	Eastern Creek	(Australia) Australian Grand Prix	1991–1996	6		Eastern Creek
Fuji Speedway	race circuit	Clockwise	Oyama	(Japan) Japanese Grand Prix	1966–1967	2		Fuji Speedway
Hedemora Circuit	street circuit	Clockwise	Hedemora	(Sweden) Swedish Grand Prix	1958	1		Hedemora
Hockenheimring	race circuit	Clockwise	Hockenheim	(Germany) German Grand Prix	1957, 1959, 1961, 1963, 1966–1967, 1969, 1971, 1973, 1975, 1977, 1979, 1981–1983, 1985, 1987, 1989, 1991–1994	22	23	Hockenheim
Hockenheimring	race circuit	Clockwise	Hockenheim	Baden-Württemberg Grand Prix	1986	1	23	Hockenheim
Hungaroring	race circuit	Clockwise	Mogyoród	(Hungary) Hungarian Grand Prix	1990, 1992	2		Hungaroring
Imatra Circuit	road circuit	Clockwise	Imatra	(Finland) Finnish Grand Prix	1964–1982	19		Imatra Circuit
Indianapolis Motor Speedway	race circuit	Anti-clockwise	Speedway	Indianapolis Grand Prix	2008–2015	8		Indianapolis Motor Speedway
Istanbul Park	race circuit	Anti-clockwise	Tuzla	(Turkey) Turkish Grand Prix	2005–2007	3		Istanbul Park
Johor Circuit	race circuit	Clockwise	Pasir Gudang	(Malaysia) Malaysian Grand Prix	1998	1		Johor Circuit
Karlskoga Motorstadion	race circuit	Clockwise	Karlskoga	(Sweden) Swedish Grand Prix	1978–1979	2		Karlskoga
Kyalami Grand Prix Circuit	race circuit	Both (Anti-clockwise in 1992)	Midrand	(South Africa) South African Grand Prix	1983–1985, 1992	4		Kyalami
Lusail International Circuit ✔	race circuit	Clockwise	Lusail	Qatar Grand Prix	2004–2026	23	24	Lusail
Lusail International Circuit ✔	race circuit	Clockwise	Lusail	(Qatar) Doha Grand Prix	2021	1	24	Lusail
Mandalika International Street Circuit ✔	street circuit	Clockwise	Mandalika	(Indonesia) Indonesian Grand Prix	2022–2026	5		Mandalika
Mazda Raceway Laguna Seca	race circuit	Anti-Clockwise	Monterey	United States Grand Prix	1988–1991, 1993–1994, 2005–2013	15		Laguna Seca
Misano World Circuit Marco Simoncelli ✔	race circuit	Both (Clockwise since 2007)	Misano Adriatico	(Italy) Italian Grand Prix	1980, 1982, 1984, 1989–1991, 1993	7	33	Misano
Misano World Circuit Marco Simoncelli ✔	race circuit	Both (Clockwise since 2007)	Misano Adriatico	San Marino and Rimini Riviera Grand Prix	1985–1987, 2007–2026	23	33	Misano
Misano World Circuit Marco Simoncelli ✔	race circuit	Both (Clockwise since 2007)	Misano Adriatico	(Emilia-Romagna) Emilia Romagna Grand Prix	2020–2021, 2024	3	33	Misano
Mobility Resort Motegi ✔	race circuit	Clockwise	Motegi	(Japan) Japanese Grand Prix	1999, 2004–2019, 2022–2026	22	26	Motegi
Mobility Resort Motegi ✔	race circuit	Clockwise	Motegi	(Tochigi Prefecture) Pacific Grand Prix	2000–2003	4	26	Motegi
Montjuïc Circuit	street circuit	Anti-clockwise	Montjuic	(Spain) Spanish Grand Prix	1951–1955, 1961–1968, 1970, 1972, 1974, 1976	17		Montjuïc
Mosport International Raceway	race circuit	Clockwise	Bowmanville	(Canada) Canadian Grand Prix	1967	1		Mosport
MotorLand Aragón ✔	race circuit	Anti-clockwise	Alcañiz	Aragon Grand Prix	2010–2022, 2024–2026	16	17	Motorland Aragon
MotorLand Aragón ✔	race circuit	Anti-clockwise	Alcañiz	(Province of Teruel) Teruel Grand Prix	2020	1	17	Motorland Aragon
Nürburgring	race circuit	Clockwise	Nürburg	(Germany) German Grand Prix	1955, 1958, 1965, 1968, 1970, 1972, 1974, 1976, 1978, 1980, 1984, 1986, 1988, 1990, 1995–1997	17		Nürburgring
Opatija Circuit	road circuit	Clockwise	Opatija	(Socialist Federal Republic of Yugoslavia) Yugoslavian Grand Prix	1969–1970, 1972–1977	8		Opatija
Petronas Sepang International Circuit ✔	race circuit	Clockwise	Sepang	(Malaysia) Malaysian Grand Prix	1999–2019, 2022–2026	26		Sepang
Phakisa Freeway	race circuit	Clockwise	Odendaalsrus	(South Africa) South African Grand Prix	1999–2004	6		Welkom
Phillip Island Grand Prix Circuit	race circuit	Anti-clockwise	Ventnor	(Australia) Australian Grand Prix	1989–1990, 1997–2019, 2022–2025	29		Phillip Island
Råbelövsbanan	street circuit	Clockwise	Kristianstad	(Sweden) Swedish Grand Prix	1959, 1961	2		Kristianstad
Red Bull Ring ✔	race circuit	Clockwise	Spielberg	(Austria) Austrian Grand Prix	1996–1997, 2016–2026	13	15	Spielberg
Red Bull Ring ✔	race circuit	Clockwise	Spielberg	(Styria) Styrian Grand Prix	2020–2021	2	15	Spielberg
Reims-Gueux	road circuit	Clockwise	Gueux	(France) French Grand Prix	1954–1955	2		Reims-Gueux
Rouen-Les-Essarts	road circuit	Clockwise	Orival	(France) French Grand Prix	1953, 1965	2		Rouen-Les-Essarts
Sachsenring ✔	road/race circuit	Anti-clockwise	Hohenstein-Ernstthal	(East Germany) East German Grand Prix	1961–1972	12	40	Sachsenring
Sachsenring ✔	road/race circuit	Anti-clockwise	Hohenstein-Ernstthal	(Germany) German Grand Prix	1998–2019, 2021–2026	28	40	Sachsenring
Salzburgring	race circuit	Clockwise	Plainfeld	(Austria) Austrian Grand Prix	1971–1979, 1981–1991, 1993–1994	22		Salzburging
San Carlos Circuit	street circuit	Clockwise	San Carlos	(Venezuela) Venezuelan Grand Prix	1977–1979	3		San Carlos
Scandinavian Raceway	race circuit	Clockwise	Anderstorp	(Sweden) Swedish Grand Prix	1971–1977, 1981–1990	17		Anderstorp
Schottenring	road circuit	Clockwise	Schotten	(West Germany) German Grand Prix	1953	1		Schottenring
Sentul International Circuit	race circuit	Clockwise	Sentul	(Indonesia) Indonesian Grand Prix	1996–1997	2		Sentul
Shah Alam Circuit	race circuit	Clockwise	Shah Alam	(Malaysia) Malaysian Grand Prix	1991–1997	7		Shah Alam
Shanghai International Circuit	race circuit	Clockwise	Jiading	(China) Chinese Grand Prix	2005–2008	4		Shanghai
Silverstone Circuit ✔	race circuit	Clockwise	Silverstone	(United Kingdom) British Grand Prix	1977–1986, 2010–2017, 2019, 2021–2026	25		Silverstone
Snaefell Mountain Course (Note: Between 1954 and 1959, the lightweight class used Clypse Course Circuit.)	road circuit	Clockwise	Isle of Man	Isle of Man TT	1949–1976	28		Snaefell Mountain Course
Solitudering	road circuit	Anti-clockwise	Leonberg	(West Germany) German Grand Prix	1952, 1954, 1956, 1960, 1962, 1964	6		Solitude Racetrack
Suzuka International Racing Course	race circuit	Both	Suzuka	(Japan) Japanese Grand Prix	1963–1965, 1987–1998, 2000–2003	19		Suzuka
Tampere Circuit	road circuit	Clockwise	Tampere	(Finland) Finnish Grand Prix	1962–1963	2		Tampere
TT Circuit Assen ✔	race circuit	Clockwise	Assen	(Netherlands) Dutch TT	1949–2019, 2021–2026	77		Assen
