= Loft (building) =

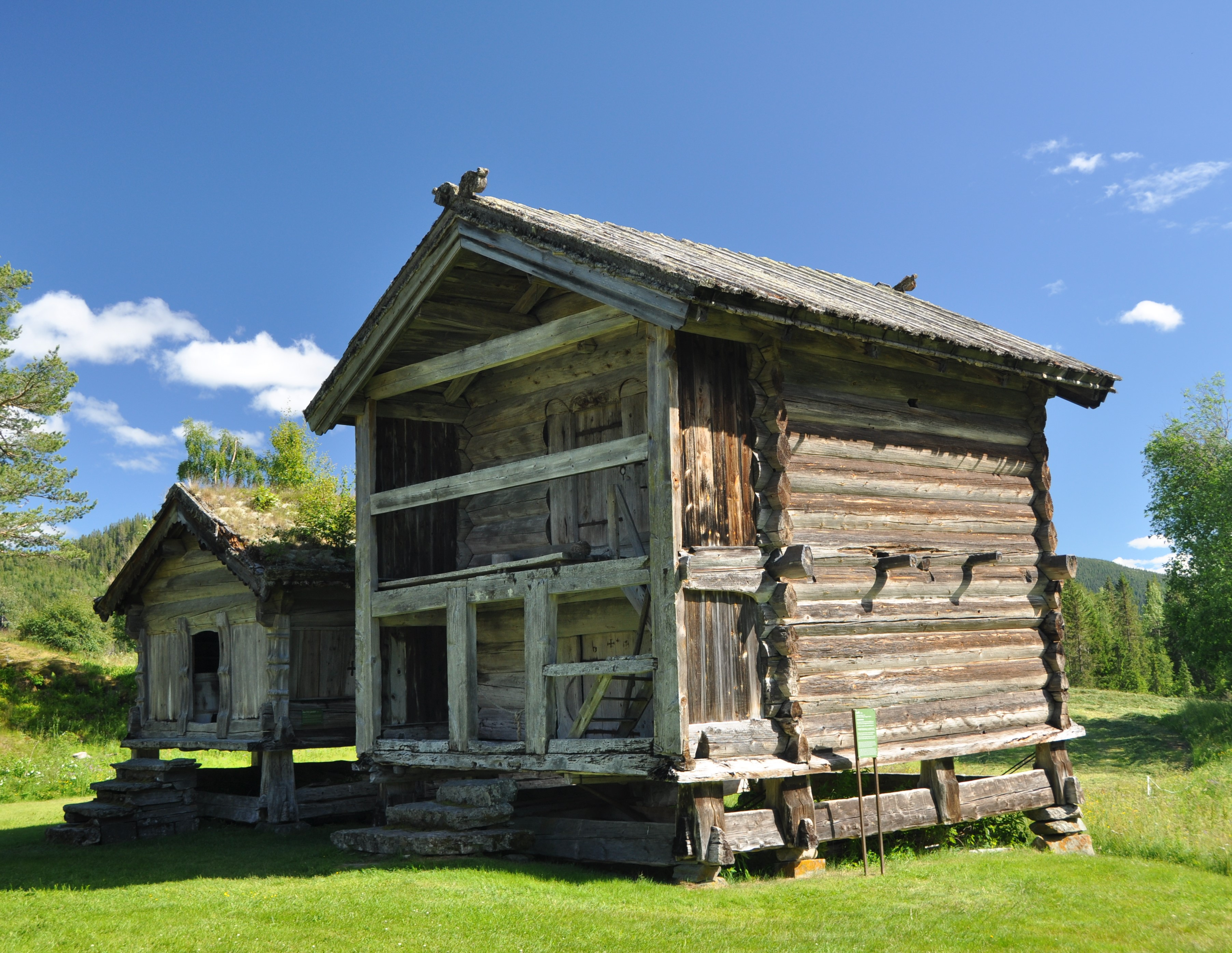
Vindlausloftet (right hand) in Eidsborg, Telemark, is the oldest non-religious wooden building in Europe. Possibly the oldest in the world as the dendrochronology confirmed that it is built of ore-pine from 1167. Inside on the wall a 66 cm runic inscription reads in translation: "These runes Vestein carved. Hail to both the one that carved and the one the reads these runes." Runes are dated to around year 1300. . A stabbur on the left hand.

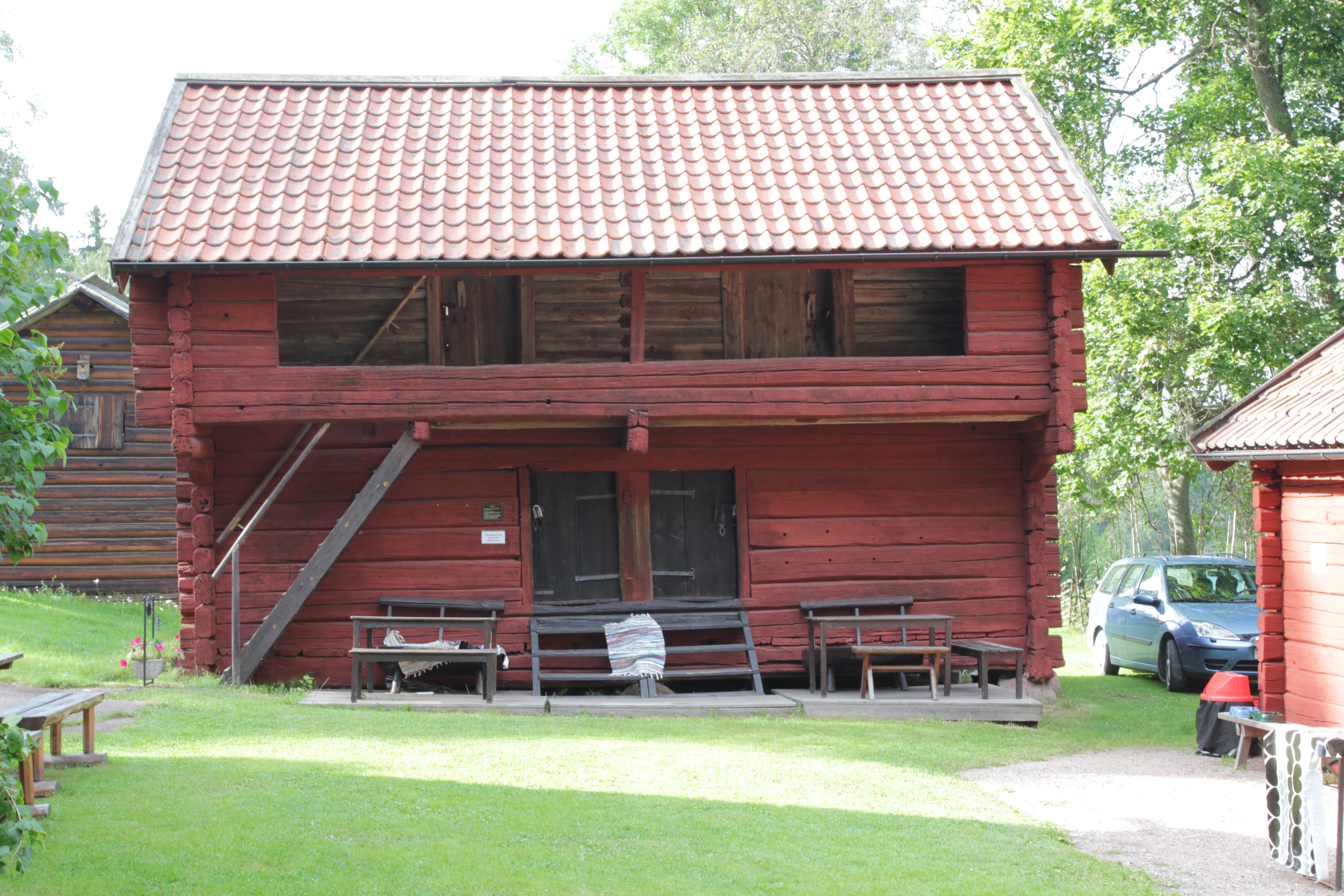
Loft building with four rooms, 17th century, Dalarna (Sweden), now at Hedemora gammelgård museum.

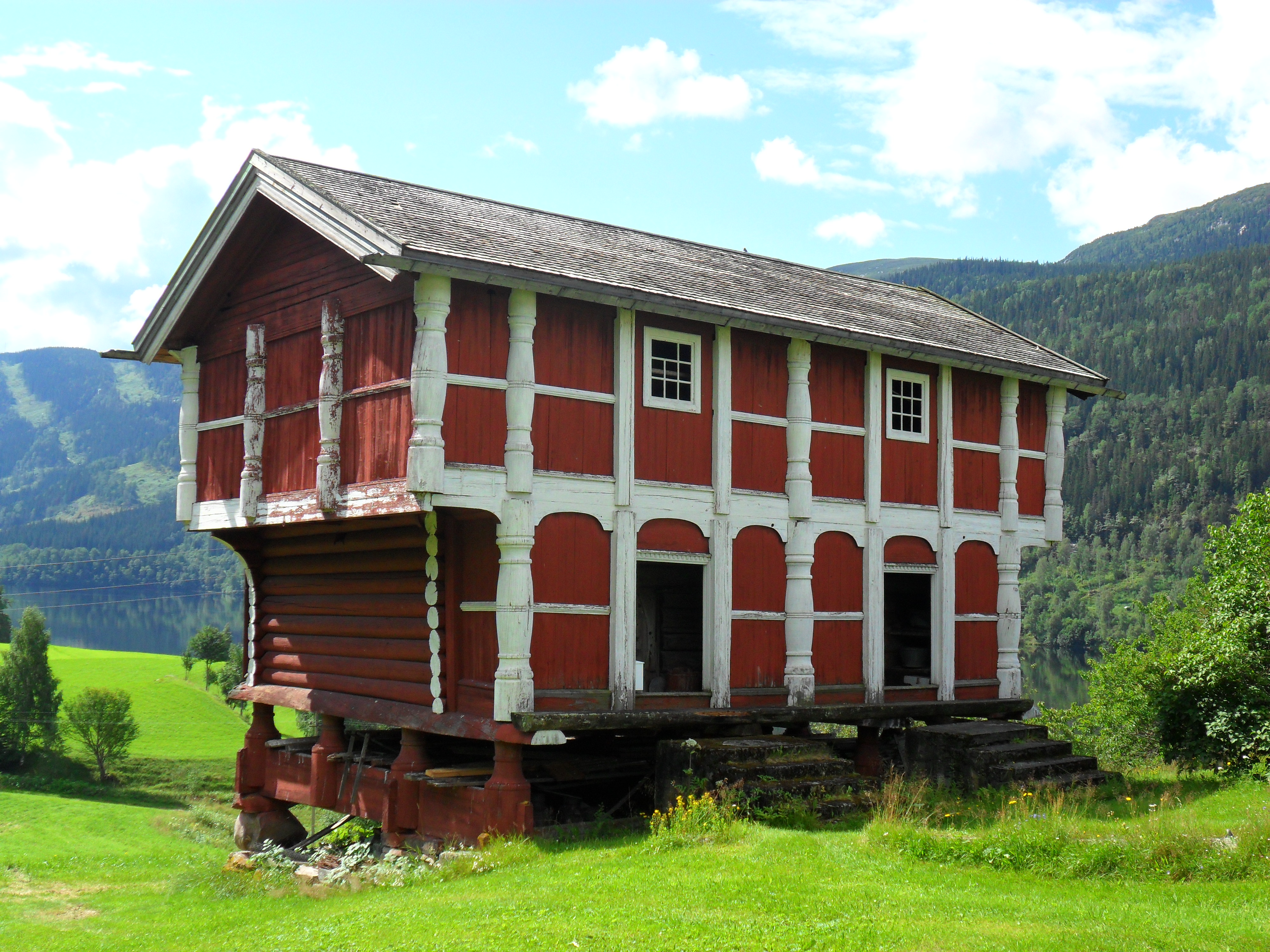
The loft at Mellom Kravik, Nore og Uvdal.

Loft is a traditional two-storey wooden building preserved mostly in Norway. A loft was used for storage and sleeping, and is known since the early Middle Ages. Loft buildings dating from around 1200 are preserved in rural areas. Lofts were typically built in log technique, unlike the post and lintel construction in stave churches. Many lofts have an external corridor or balcony (Norwegian: svalgang) resting on a log corbel. The oldest non-religious wooden buildings in Norway are lofts. In addition to the stave church, Christian Norberg-Schulz regards the loft as Norway's most important contribution to history of architecture.

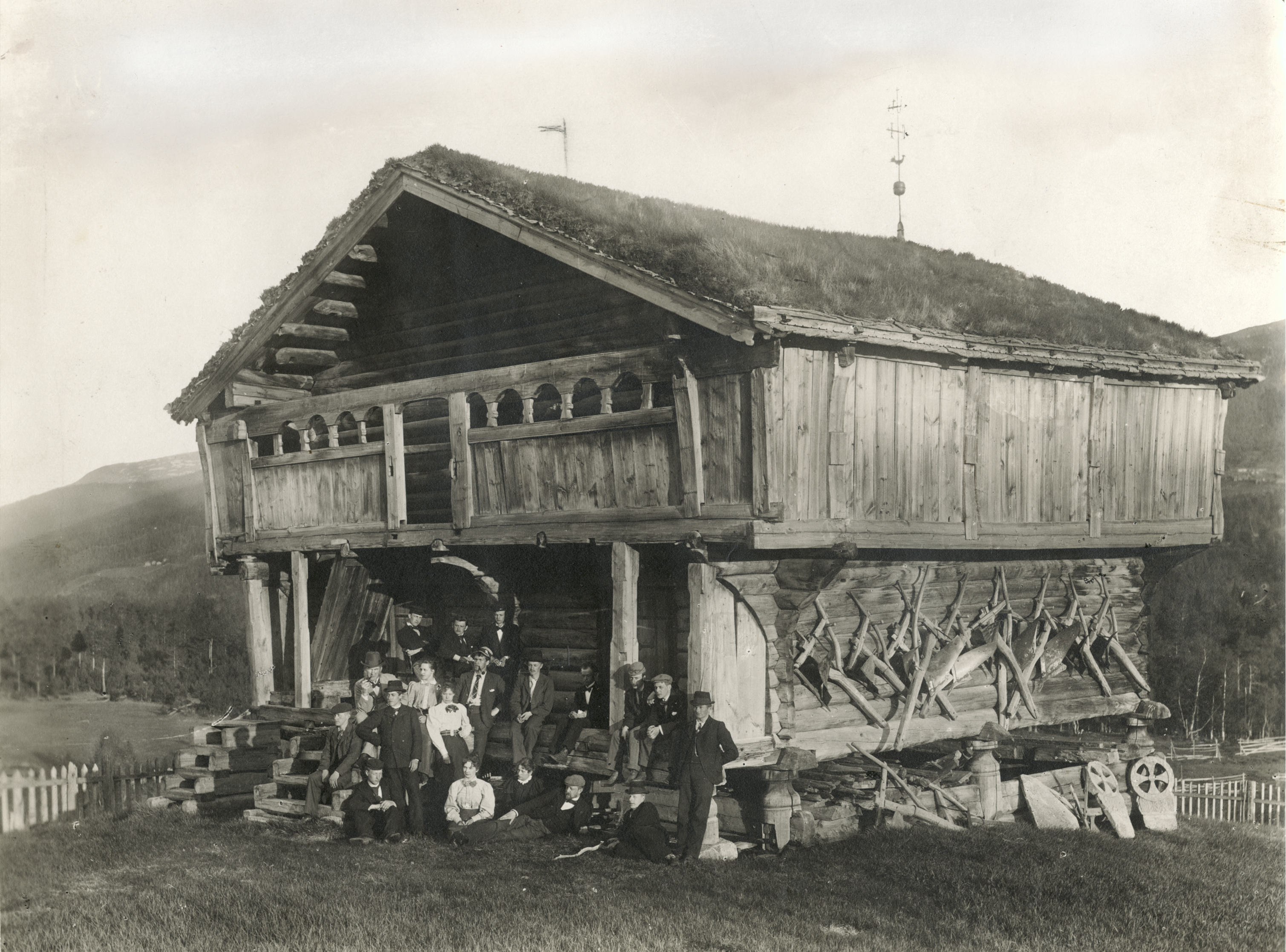
A large loft at Bjølstad Farm, protected by law since 1924. photo: Herman Major Schirmer.

The loft was often most prominent and costly of buildings on a major farm. Clothes, fine textile and other valuables were often kept in the upper storey which was also the finest bedroom offered to prominent guests. The lower storey was used as a storage in particular for dry food such as grain. Stately farms in East Norway could have 20 or 30 buildings (even smaller farms had more than ten) each with special function. Traditional lofts did not have heating as the dwelling or residential building (stue) was the only building with a fire place. A log-built loft could easily be dismantled and moved to another location, and many lofts have been moved several times. In some areas young brides got a loft as a gift or as dowry.

Specialised food storage buildings known as bur or stabbur in Norwegian are usually smaller, one-storey and usually without windows. Stabbur is in the German-speaking Alps known as Speicher and in Spanish hórreo. Stabbur and loft are similar buildings and are often confused. A two-storey stabbur usually has stairway indoor, whereas a loft has stairs on the outside and access to the upper storey from the external gallery or balcony.

In modern Norwegian and in English, "loft" is used for the upper room or the space just under the roof in larger buildings. The word originates from Old Norse lopt, loft which also could mean air or being elevated (as in the related word løfte, English "to lift").

Norway is one of few countries with a number of preserved medieval wooden buildings. There is a smaller number of log buildings older than 1600 in the Alps region. In Norway there are about 100 preserved medieval log buildings and the majority of these are in Telemark district. High quality craftsmanship, high quality timber and prestige of the building presumably contributed to the preservation of ancient lofts during the centuries. According to Heimskringla Olaf II of Norway slept in a loft during a travel in Lom Municipality. In Swedish Dalarna and Uppland two-storey buildings with external gallery named loft are known since late Middle Ages. Gustav I of Sweden is said to have held a speech from a loft during a visit to Dalarna in 1528. In Denmark lofts are known from medieval sources and primarily in connection with major farms. At Bornholm there were lofts (also known as stairway houses) particularly on stately or gentile farms. In Finland this type of building is known from the late Middle Ages and are called lutti or luhti (adopted from Finland Swedish lupt).
