= 1958 Grand Prix motorcycle racing season =

Sports season

1958 F.I.M. Grand Prix motorcycle racing season

Seasons
- ← 1957 1959 →

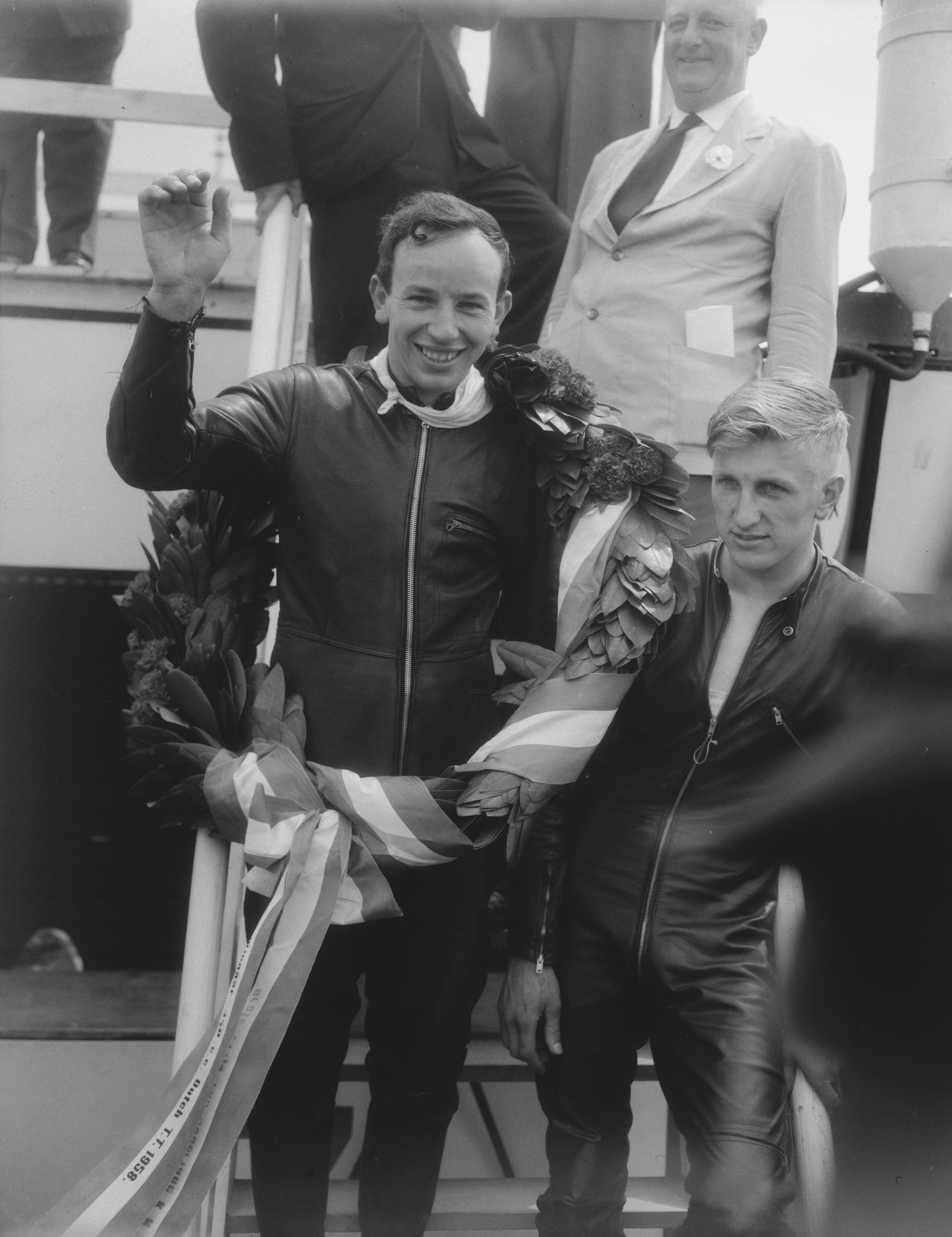
John Surtees, the 1958 350cc and 500cc World Champion.

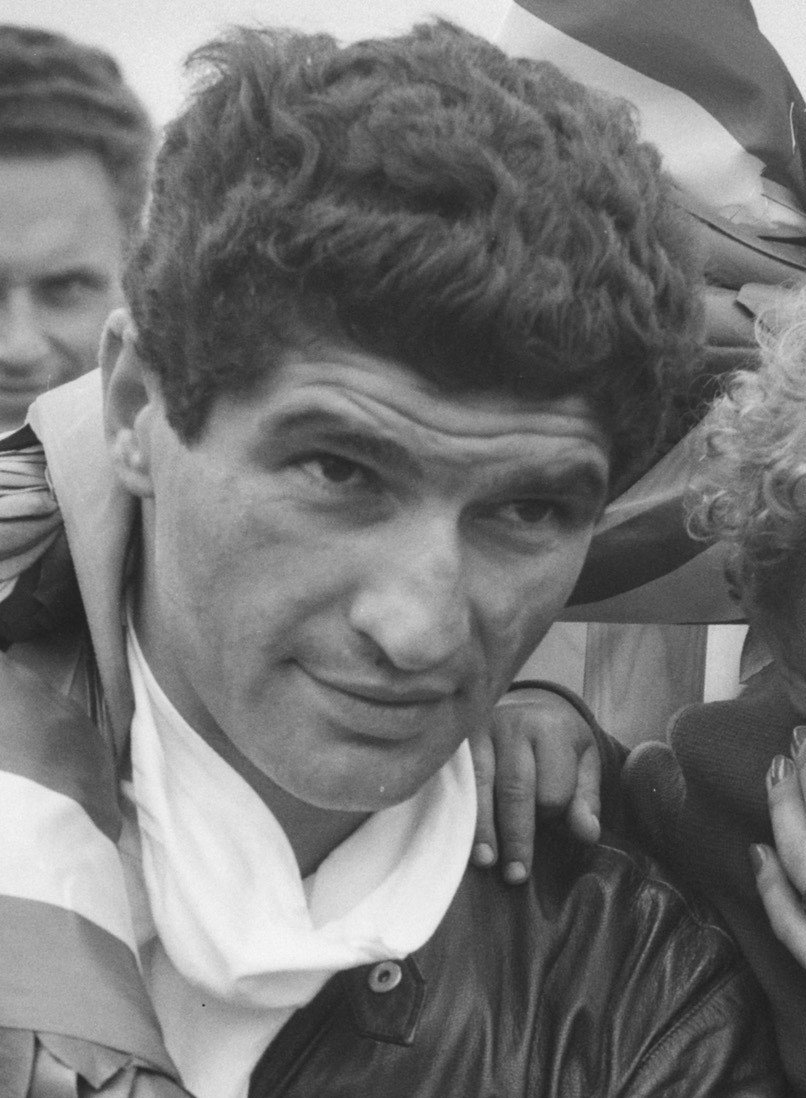
Tarquinio Provini (pictured in 1959), the 1958 250cc World Champion.

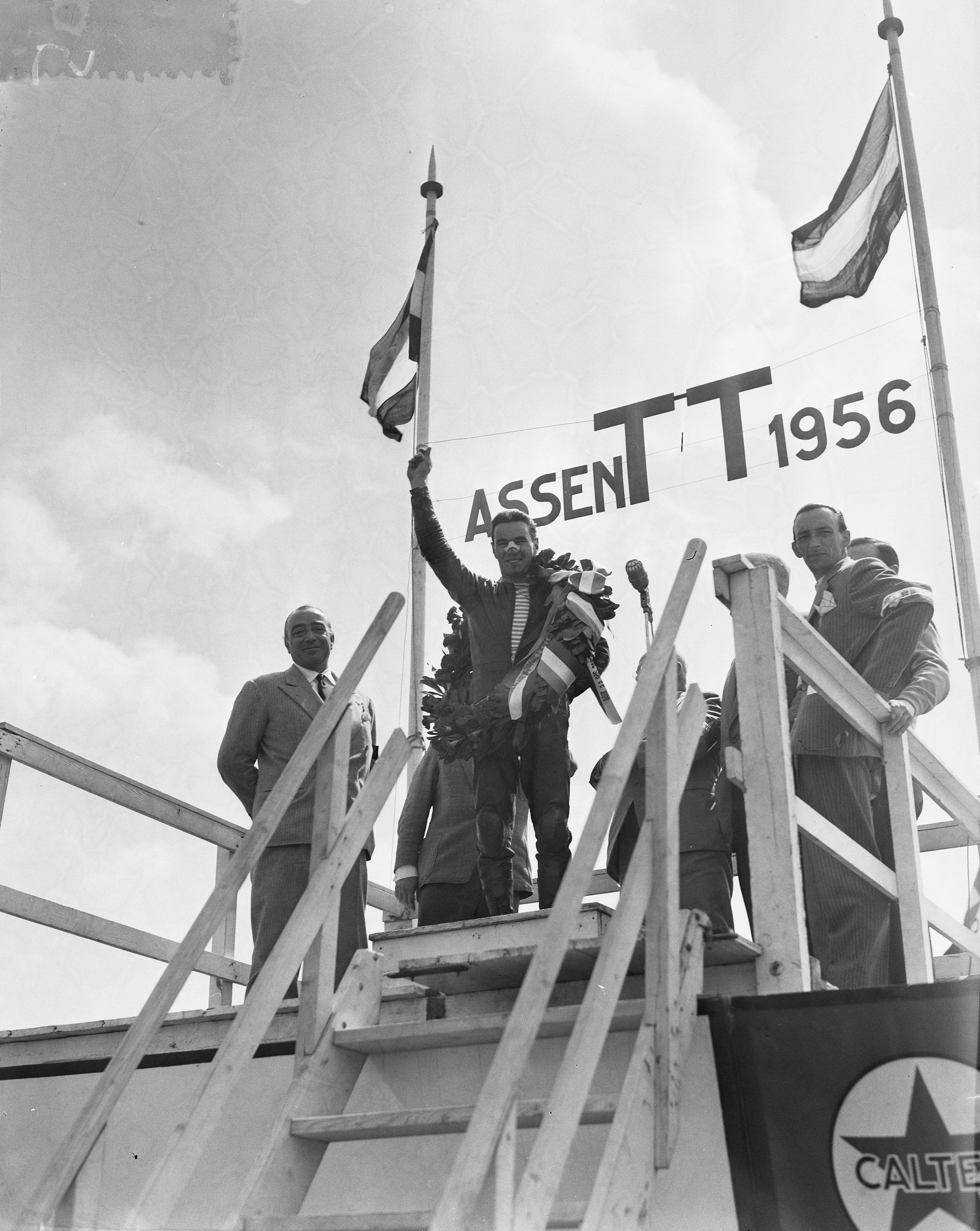
Carlo Ubbiali (pictured in 1956), the 1958 125cc World Champion.

The 1958 Grand Prix motorcycle racing season was the tenth F.I.M. Road Racing World Championship Grand Prix season. The season consisted of seven Grand Prix races in five classes: 500cc, 350cc, 250cc, 125cc and Sidecars 500cc. It began on 6 June, with Isle of Man TT and ended with Nations Grand Prix in Italy on 14 September.

At the end of the 1957 season, Gilera, Mondial, Moto Guzzi and MV Agusta announced a multilateral withdrawal from GP racing, due to economic reasons and rising public pressure due to the large amount of fatal motorsport accidents occurring in Italy during the previous years. MV Agusta reverted their decision several days later. This situation left reigning 500cc champion Libero Liberati and reigning 250cc champion Cecil Sandford without rides for 1958.

A major technical change for 1958 was the ban of dustbin fairings - streamlined bodywork that covered front wheels - in all classes. They were used by most entrants by the end of 1957, including privateers. As of 2023, the rule is still in place in MotoGP.

== 1958 Grand Prix season calendar ==
Round	Date	Grand Prix	Circuit	125cc winner	250cc winner	350cc winner	500cc winner	Sidecars 500cc winner	Report
1	6 June	Isle of Man TT	Snaefell Mountain	(Italy) Carlo Ubbiali	(Italy) Tarquinio Provini	(United Kingdom) John Surtees	(United Kingdom) John Surtees	(Germany) Schneider / Strauß	Report
2	28 June	(Netherlands) Dutch TT	TT Circuit Assen	(Italy) Carlo Ubbiali	(Italy) Tarquinio Provini	(United Kingdom) John Surtees	(United Kingdom) John Surtees	(Switzerland) (Germany) Camathias / Cecco	Report
3	6 July	(Belgium) Belgian Grand Prix	Spa-Francorchamps	(Italy) Alberto Gandossi		(United Kingdom) John Surtees	(United Kingdom) John Surtees	(Germany) Schneider / Strauß	Report
4	20 July	(West Germany) German Grand Prix	Nürburgring Nordschleife	(Italy) Carlo Ubbiali	(Italy) Tarquinio Provini	(United Kingdom) John Surtees	(United Kingdom) John Surtees	(Germany) Schneider / Strauß	Report
5	27 July	(Sweden) Swedish Grand Prix	Hedemora Circuit	(Italy) Alberto Gandossi	(East Germany) Horst Fügner	(United Kingdom) Geoff Duke	(United Kingdom) Geoff Duke		Report
6	9 August	(Northern Ireland) Ulster Grand Prix	Dundrod Circuit	(Italy) Carlo Ubbiali	(Italy) Tarquinio Provini	(United Kingdom) John Surtees	(United Kingdom) John Surtees		Report
7	14 September	(Italy) Nations Grand Prix †	Monza	(Italy) Bruno Spaggiari	(Italy) Emilio Mendogni	(United Kingdom) John Surtees	(United Kingdom) John Surtees		Report

† The Nations Grand Prix also held a non-championship 175 cc race, won by the Italian, Francesco Villa.

== Standings ==
=== Scoring system ===
Points were awarded to the top six finishers in each race. Only the four best races counted in 125cc, 250cc, 350cc and 500cc championships, while in the Sidecars the three best results were counted.

Position	1st	2nd	3rd	4th	5th	6th
Points	8	6	4	3	2	1

==== 500cc final standings ====
Pos	Rider	Machine	MAN (Isle of Man)	HOL (Netherlands)	BEL (Belgium)	GER (Germany)	SWE (Sweden)	ULS (Northern Ireland)	NAC (Italy)	Pts
1	(United Kingdom) John Surtees	MV Agusta	1	**1**	**1**	1		**1**	**1**	**32** (48)
2	(United Kingdom) John Hartle	MV Agusta	Ret	2	3	2		3	Ret	**20**
3	(United Kingdom) Geoff Duke	BMW / Norton	Ret	Ret	4	Ret	1	5	7	**13**
4	(United Kingdom) Dickie Dale	BMW	10	5	5	5	2	6	4	**13** (16)
5	(United Kingdom) Derek Minter	Norton	4	3	Ret			4		**10**
6	(Federation of Rhodesia and Nyasaland) Gary Hocking	Norton		6		3	4			**8**
7	(Germany) Ernst Hiller	BMW		4	Ret	4	5	Ret	10	**8**
8	(United Kingdom) Bob Anderson	Norton	2	Ret	6	Ret	Ret	Ret	Ret	**7**
9	(Australia) Keith Campbell	Norton	Ret	Ret	2					**6**
10	(United Kingdom) Bob McIntyre	Norton	Ret					2		**6**
11	(Italy) Remo Venturi	MV Agusta							2	**6**
12	(Australia) Bob Brown	Norton / BMW	3	10	16	6	6	7	Ret	**6**
13	(United Kingdom) Terry Shepherd	Norton	Ret	Ret			3	Ret		**4**
14	(Italy) Umberto Masetti	MV Agusta							3	**4**
15	(United Kingdom) Dave Chadwick	Norton	5	Ret	Ret	Ret			6	**3**
16	(Italy) Carlo Bandirola	MV Agusta							5	**2**
17	(New Zealand) John Anderson	Norton / Matchless	6		12					**1**
18	(New Zealand) Noel McCutcheon	Norton	16	7	10					**0**
19	(Germany) Alois Huber	BMW				7			11	**0**
20	(United Kingdom) George Catlin	Norton	7	Ret	13					**0**
21	(United Kingdom) Alan Trow	Norton	Ret	Ret	7	Ret	Ret			**0**
22	(South Africa) Paddy Driver	Norton	Ret	Ret			7			**0**
23	(Australia) Tom Phillis	Norton	18	9			8			**0**
24	(United Kingdom) Ewan Haldane	Norton	8					9		**0**
25	(New Zealand) John Hempleman	Norton	15	8	11		Ret	Ret		**0**
26	(United Kingdom) Jack Brett	Norton	Ret	12	8	**Ret**				**0**
27	(United Kingdom) Ralph Rensen	Norton	12					8		**0**
28	(Italy) Giuseppe Cantoni	MV Agusta							8	**0**
=	(Germany) Karl Peters	Norton				8				**0**
30	(Austria) Gerold Klinger	BMW				9			9	**0**
31	(Federation of Rhodesia and Nyasaland) Jim Redman	Norton	19	Ret			9			**0**
32	(United Kingdom) Geoffrey Tanner	Norton	Ret	Ret	9			Ret		**0**
33	(New Zealand) Peter Pawson	Norton	9	Ret						**0**
34	(United Kingdom) Jack Wood	Matchless	22					10		**0**
35	(Northern Ireland) Mike O'Rourke	Norton	Ret	Ret			10			**0**
36	(Germany) Hans-Günter Jäger	BMW				10				**0**
37	(Australia) Jack Ahearn	Matchless	29	11			13	13		**0**
38	(United Kingdom) Don Chapman	Norton	Ret					11		**0**
=	(Australia) Eric Hinton	Norton	11	Ret						**0**
40	(Germany) Rudolf Gläser	Norton				11				**0**
=	(Sweden) Kurt Johannson	Norton					11			**0**
42	(Northern Ireland) Bob Ferguson	Norton	31					12		**0**
43	(Sweden) Stig Andersson	Norton					12			**0**
=	(Italy) Adolfo Covi	Norton							12	**0**
=	(Australia) Jack Findlay	Norton				12				**0**
46	(Germany) Karl-Heinz Scheifel	Matchless				13		27		**0**
47	(France) Jacques Collot	Norton							13	**0**
=	(United Kingdom) Mike Hailwood	Norton	13							**0**
49	(Belgium) Raymond Bogaerdt	Norton			14					**0**
=	(Italy) Artemio Cirelli	Gilera							14	**0**
=	(Sweden) Evert Carlsson	BMW					14			**0**
=	(United Kingdom) Robin Fitton	Norton						14		**0**
=	(United Kingdom) Ken Tostevin	Norton	14							**0**
54	(United Kingdom) Eric Cheers	BSA	Ret					15		**0**
55	(France) Jean-Pierre Bayle	Norton			15					**0**
=	(Italy) Gianvittorio Ziglioli	Moto Guzzi							15	**0**
57	(United Kingdom) Stephen Murray	AJS						16		**0**
58	(United Kingdom) Vernon Cottle	Norton	33					17		**0**
59	(United Kingdom) Jimmy Buchan	Norton	17							**0**
60	(United Kingdom) Davy Crawford	Norton						18		**0**
61	(United Kingdom) Harry Grant	Norton						19		**0**
62	(United Kingdom) Harry Plews	Norton / AJS	30					20		**0**
63	(United Kingdom) Derek Powell	Norton	20							**0**
64	(United Kingdom) Bertie Farlow	Norton						21		**0**
=	(United Kingdom) Ray Fay	Norton	21							**0**
66	(Northern Ireland) William McCosh	Matchless						22		**0**
67	(United Kingdom) Jimmy Jones	Norton						23		**0**
=	(United Kingdom) Brian Purslow	Norton	23							**0**
69	(United Kingdom) George Costain	Norton	24							**0**
=	(Northern Ireland) Ernie Oliver	AJS						24		**0**
71	(United Kingdom) Alan Holmes	Norton	25							**0**
=	(United Kingdom) Llewellyn Ranson	AJS						25		**0**
73	(Northern Ireland) Robert McCracken	Norton						26		**0**
=	(United Kingdom) Brian Setchell	Norton	26							**0**
75	(United Kingdom) Bob Rowbottom	Norton	27					Ret		**0**
76	(Northern Ireland) Martin Brosnan	Norton						28		**0**
77	(United Kingdom) Syd Mizen	Norton	28							**0**
78	(United Kingdom) Philip Palmer	Norton	32							**0**
79	(United Kingdom) Harry Voice	Norton	34							**0**
80	(United Kingdom) Arthur Wheeler	AJS	35							**0**
81	(United Kingdom) Louis Carr	Norton	36							**0**
82	(United Kingdom) Barry Cortvriend	Matchless	37							**0**
83	(United Kingdom) Albert Moule	Norton	38							**0**
84	(United Kingdom) Bill Robertson	Norton	39							**0**
85	(United States) John Marcotte	AJS	40							**0**
86	(Australia) Allen Burt	AJS	41					Ret		**0**
87	(Canada) Ian McGuffie	Norton	42							**0**
88	(United Kingdom) Walter Hancock	Norton	43							**0**
89	(United Kingdom) Grenville Pennington	Norton	44							**0**
90	(Australia) Jim Tompsett	AJS	45					Ret		**0**
91	(United Kingdom) Roly Capner	BSA	46							**0**
92	(United Kingdom) George Northwood	Norton	47							**0**
93	(Australia) Clarrie Dunn	AJS	48					Ret		**0**
-	(Australia) Harry Hinton Jr.	Norton	Ret	Ret						**0**
-	(Australia) Dick Thompson	Norton	Ret					Ret		**0**
-	(Canada) Bob Webster	Norton	Ret					Ret		**0**
-	(United Kingdom) Bill Beevers	Norton	Ret							**0**
-	(Italy) Paolo Campanelli	Norton							Ret	**0**
-	(Northern Ireland) Austin Carson	Norton		Ret						**0**
-	(South Africa) Borro Castellani	Norton	Ret							**0**
-	(Italy) Fabio Ceredi	Moto Guzzi							Ret	**0**
-	(Northern Ireland) Bob Coulter	BSA						Ret		**0**
-	(United Kingdom) Ken Draper	Norton	Ret							**0**
-	(Italy) Gerardo Düring	Matchless					Ret			**0**
-	(United Kingdom) Jack Forrest	BMW		Ret						**0**
-	(United Kingdom) Laurie Flury	AJS	Ret							**0**
-	(Italy) Francesco Guglielminetti	Norton							Ret	**0**
-	(United Kingdom) Roy Ingram	Norton	Ret							**0**
-	(France) Jacques Insermini	Norton							Ret	**0**
-	(France) Guy Ligier	Norton			Ret					**0**
-	(United Kingdom) Alistair King	Norton	Ret							**0**
-	(Italy) Giuseppe Mantelli	Gilera							Ret	**0**
-	(Italy) Luigi Marcelli	Norton							Ret	**0**
-	(Italy) Emanuele Maugliani	Gilera							Ret	**0**
-	(Northern Ireland) Bob Matthews	Norton		Ret						**0**
-	(United Kingdom) Tommy McLeod	Norton						Ret		**0**
-	(Italy) Alfredo Milani	Gilera							Ret	**0**
-	(Northern Ireland) Noel Orr	Matchless						Ret		**0**
-	(United Kingdom) Len Rutherford	Matchless	Ret							**0**
-	(United Kingdom) Bill Smith	Norton	Ret							**0**
-	(United Kingdom) Gerry Turner	Norton	Ret							**0**
-	(Federation of Rhodesia and Nyasaland) Desmond Wolff	Norton	Ret							**0**
Pos	Rider	Bike	MAN (United Kingdom)	HOL (Netherlands)	BEL (Belgium)	GER (Germany)	SWE (Sweden)	ULS (Ulster)	NAC (Italy)	Pts

Colour	Result
Gold	Winner
Silver	Second place
Bronze	Third place
Green	Points classification
Blue	Non-points classification
Blue	Non-classified finish (NC)
Purple	Retired, not classified (Ret)
Red	Did not qualify (DNQ)
Red	Did not pre-qualify (DNPQ)
Black	Disqualified (DSQ)
White	Did not start (DNS)
White	Withdrew (WD)
White	Race cancelled (C)
Blank	Did not practice (DNP)
Blank	Did not arrive (DNA)
Blank	Excluded (EX)

**Bold** – Pole
Italics – Fastest Lap

=== 350cc Standings ===
Place	Rider	Number	Country	Machine	Points	Wins
1	(United Kingdom) John Surtees		United Kingdom	MV Agusta	32	6
2	(United Kingdom) John Hartle		United Kingdom	MV Agusta	24	0
3	(United Kingdom) Geoff Duke		United Kingdom	Norton	17	1
4	(United Kingdom) Dave Chadwick		United Kingdom	Norton	13	0
5	(United Kingdom) Bob Anderson		United Kingdom	Norton	11	0
6	(United Kingdom) Mike Hailwood		United Kingdom	Norton	9	0
7	(Australia) Keith Campbell		Australia	Norton	8	0
8	(United Kingdom) Derek Minter		United Kingdom	Norton	7	0
=	(United Kingdom) Terry Shepherd		United Kingdom	Norton	7	0
10	(United Kingdom) Geoffrey Tanner		United Kingdom	Norton	4	0
11	(United Kingdom) Alan Trow		United Kingdom	Norton	3	0
12	(United Kingdom) Bob McIntyre		United Kingdom	Norton	2	0
=	(United Kingdom) Geoff Monty		United Kingdom	Norton	2	0
=	(United Kingdom) George Catlin		United Kingdom	Norton	2	0
15	(Australia) Bob Brown		Australia	AJS	1	0
=	(United Kingdom) Alistair King		United Kingdom	Norton	1	0
=	(United Kingdom) Dickie Dale		United Kingdom	Norton	1	0
=	(Switzerland) Luigi Taveri		Switzerland	Norton	1	0
=	(United Kingdom) Mike O'Rourke		United Kingdom	Norton	1	0

=== 250cc Standings ===
Place	Rider	Number	Country	Machine	Points	Wins
1	(Italy) Tarquinio Provini		Italy	MV Agusta	32	4
2	(East Germany) Horst Fügner		East Germany	MZ	16	1
3	(Italy) Carlo Ubbiali		Italy	MV Agusta	16	0
4	(United Kingdom) Mike Hailwood		United Kingdom	NSU	13	0
5	(West Germany) Dieter Falk		West Germany	Adler	11	0
6	(Italy) Emilio Mendogni		Italy	Morini	8	1
7	(United Kingdom) Tommy Robb		United Kingdom	NSU	7	0
=	(Italy) Giampiero Zubani		Italy	Morini	6	0
9	(West Germany) Günter Beer		West Germany	Adler	6	0
10	(United Kingdom) Dave Chadwick		United Kingdom	MV Agusta	4	0
=	(United Kingdom) Geoff Monty		United Kingdom	GMS-NSU	4	0
12	(West Germany) Horst Kassner		West Germany	NSU	4	0
13	(Austria) Josef Autengruber		Austria	NSU	4	0
14	(West Germany) Ernst Degner		West Germany	MZ	3	0
=	(Australia) Bob Brown		Australia	NSU	3	0
16	(United Kingdom) Arthur Wheeler		United Kingdom	Mondial	2	0
=	(West Germany) Xaver Heiß		West Germany	NSU	2	0
18	(United Kingdom) Dickie Dale		United Kingdom	NSU	1	0
=	(United Kingdom) Sammy Miller		United Kingdom	ČZ	1	0
=	(West Germany) Walter Reichert		West Germany	NSU	1	0
=	(West Germany) Wilhelm Lecke		West Germany	DKW	1	0

=== 125cc ===
==== Riders' standings ====
Pos.	Rider	Bike	MAN (Isle of Man)	NED (Netherlands)	BEL (Belgium)	GER (Germany)	SWE (Sweden)	ULS (Northern Ireland)	NAT (Italy)	Pts
1	(Italy) Carlo Ubbiali	MV Agusta	1**^{F}**	1	5	1**^{F}**	3	1		32 (38)
2	(Italy) Alberto Gandossi	Ducati		4	1**^{F}**		1	4**^{F}**	2	25 (28)
3	(Switzerland) Luigi Taveri	Ducati		2**^{F}**	6		2**^{F}**	2	5	20 (21)
4	(Italy) Tarquinio Provini	MV Agusta		3	3	2	4			17
5	(United Kingdom) Dave Chadwick	Ducati	3	5	4			3	4	14 (16)
6	(Italy) Romolo Ferri	Ducati	2		2					12
7	(East Germany) Ernst Degner	MZ	5	6		3	5			9
8	(Italy) Bruno Spaggiari	Ducati							1**^{F}**	8
9	(East Germany) Horst Fügner	MZ	6			4	6	5		7
10	(Italy) Francesco Villa	Ducati							3	4
11	(United Kingdom) Sammy Miller	Ducati	4							3
12	(West Germany) Walter Brehme	MZ				5				2
13	(West Germany) Werner Musiol	MZ				6				1
13	(United Kingdom) Arthur Wheeler	Mondial						6		1
13	(Italy) Enzo Vezzalini	MV Agusta							6	1
Pos.	Rider	Bike	MAN (Isle of Man)	NED (Netherlands)	BEL (Belgium)	GER (Germany)	SWE (Sweden)	ULS (Northern Ireland)	NAT (Italy)	Pts

Race key
Colour	Result
Gold	Winner
Silver	2nd place
Bronze	3rd place
Green	Points finish
Blue	Non-points finish
Blue	Non-classified finish (NC)
Purple	Retired (Ret)
Red	Did not qualify (DNQ)
Black	Disqualified (DSQ)
White	Did not start (DNS)
White	Withdrew (WD)
White	Race cancelled (C)
Blank	Did not practice (DNP)
Blank	Excluded (EX)
Blank	Did not arrive (DNA)
Blank	Did not enter (empty cell)
Annotation	Meaning
P	Pole position
F	Fastest lap
Rider key
Colour	Meaning
Light blue	Rookie rider

==== Constructors' standings ====
Each constructor is awarded the same number of points as their best placed rider in each race.

Pos.	Constructor	MAN (Isle of Man)	NED (Netherlands)	BEL (Belgium)	GER (Germany)	SWE (Sweden)	ULS (Northern Ireland)	NAT (Italy)	Pts
1	(Italy) MV Agusta	1	1	3	1	3	1	6	32 (41)
2	(Italy) Ducati	2	2	1		1	2	1	30 (42)
3	(East Germany) MZ	5	6		3	5	5		10 (11)
4	(Italy) Mondial						6		1
Pos.	Constructor	MAN (Isle of Man)	NED (Netherlands)	BEL (Belgium)	GER (Germany)	SWE (Sweden)	ULS (Northern Ireland)	NAT (Italy)	Pts
