= Hedemora stadshotell =

Hedemora principal hotel
- Hedemora stadshotell
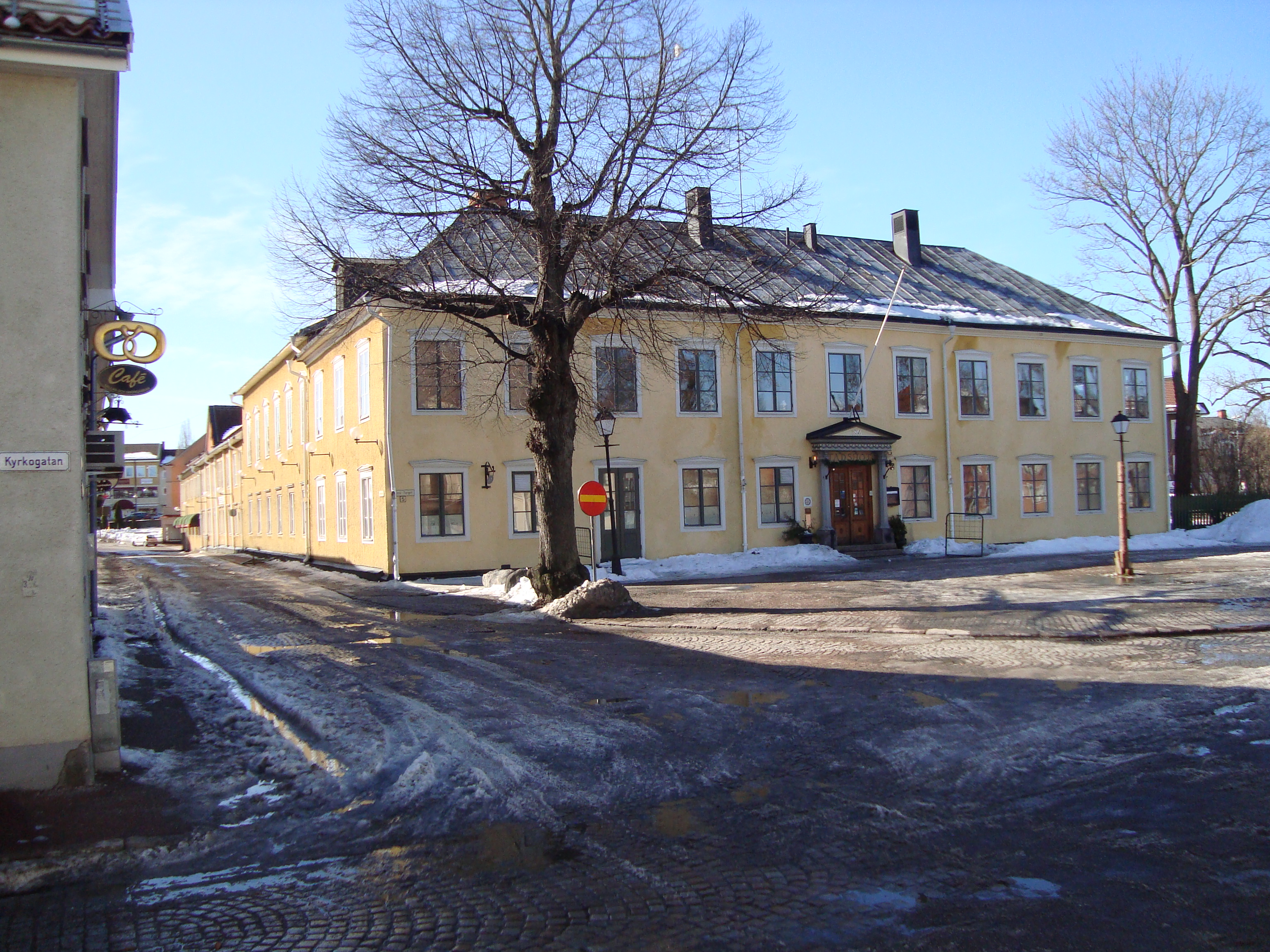
- Stadshotellet Hedemora
- Former names: Hotell Ture
- Alternative names: Ugglan 3

General information
- Location: Hedemora, Sweden, Sweden
- Coordinates: 60°16′45″N 15°59′13″E
- Completed: 1860; 1930

Design and construction
- Architect: C. Åhlander

Hedemora stadshotell is the principal hotel in Hedemora, Dalarna County, Sweden.

The hotel consists of two buildings that have been joined. The building next to Stora torget was built in 1860 based on blueprints by av C. Ålander. In 1887 restaurateur Ture Sjögren rebuilt the hotel by adding the lounge, and called it Hotell Ture. In 1890 Hedemora city came to own a third of the hotel, after money from a donation made by G. H. Melin was used for this purpose, and in 1895 the city bought the remaining part. Hedemora Spritbolag (Hedemora Spirit Company), founded in 1886, was also located in the building. In 1897, during a maneuver in Dalarna, Oscar II used the conference room as liaison office, after which the room became known as the Oscar Room.

In 1930 the building towards Hökartorget was built, where Hedemora Spritbolag moved in. In the buildings a number of different services has been located, on top of the hotel and restaurants, such as a schweizeri, a telegraph and telephone station, a barber shop, and a bank.

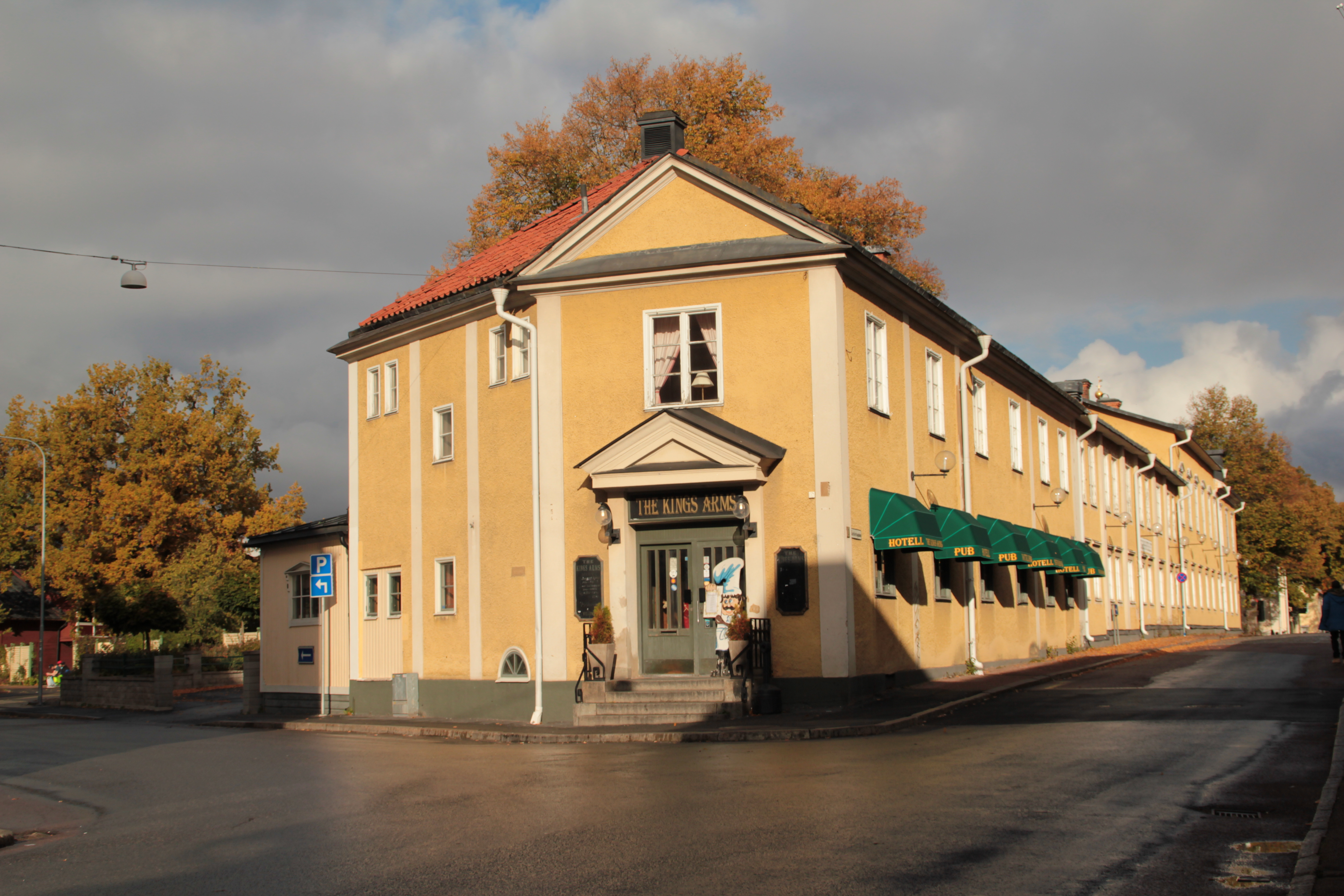
The building from 1930, with a pub downstairs.

C.J. Carlsson made a suggestion for an extension of the kitchen wing in 1907, and the building was partly rebuilt in 1916. Further changes were submitted in 1923, 1935 and 1946. In 1930 there was a rebuilding of the older building, and in 1956 the upper floor was changed in the younger building. In 1968 the entrance part was expanded and in 1970 an expansion was made for Systembolaget. During a major reconstruction in 1971, as part of public relief work, two vaulted cellars with stone walls were found.
