= Dave Chadwick =

British motorcycle racer

- Nationality: (United Kingdom) British
- Born: 24 September 1930; Manchester, Lancashire, England
- Died: 15 May 1960 (aged 29); Mettet, Belgium
Motorcycle racing career statistics
Grand Prix motorcycle racing
Active years	1955 - 1959
First race	1955 Isle of Man 250cc Lightweight TT
Last race	1959 Isle of Man 350cc Junior TT
Team(s)	MV Agusta, Ducati
Championships	0
Starts / Wins / Podiums / Poles / F. laps / Points; 20 / 0 / 7 / 0 / 1 / 55

David Vincent Chadwick (24 September 1930–15 May 1960) was a Grand Prix motorcycle road racer. His best season was in 1958 when he finished in fourth place in the 350cc world championship, and fifth in the 125cc world championship.

Chadwick was killed in 1960 while competing at the Circuit Jules Tacheny Mettet in Belgium.

== Motorcycle Grand Prix results ==
Points system from 1950 to 1968:

Position	1	2	3	4	5	6
Points	8	6	4	3	2	1

(key) (Races in italics indicate fastest lap)

Year	Class	Team	1	2	3	4	5	6	7	8	Points	Rank	Wins
1955	250cc	RD Special	IOM; 5	GER; 3	NED; 5	ULS; 5	NAT -				2	13th	0
1956	125cc	REF	IOM; 5	NED -	BEL -	GER -	ULS -	NAT -			2	16th	0
1957	125cc	MV Agusta	GER -	IOM -	NED -	BEL -	ULS; 4	NAT -			3	9th	0
1957	250cc	MV Agusta	GER -	IOM; 6	NED -	BEL -	ULS; 2	NAT -			7	8th	0
1957	350cc	Norton	GER -	IOM -	NED -	BEL -	ULS; 5	NAT -			2	14th	0
1958	125cc	Ducati	IOM; 3	NED; 5	BEL; 4	GER -	SWE -	ULS; 3	NAT; 4		14	5th	0
1958	250cc	MV Agusta	IOM -	NED -		GER -	SWE -	ULS; 3	NAT -		4	10th	0
1958	350cc	Norton	IOM; 2	NED -	BEL; 6	GER; 3	SWE -	ULS -	NAT; 5		13	4th	0
1958	500cc	Norton	IOM; 5	NED -	BEL -	GER -	SWE -	ULS -	NAT; 6		3	15th	0
1959	250cc	MV Agusta		IOM; 3	GER -	NED -	BEL -	SWE -	ULS -	NAT -	4	11th	0
1959	350cc	Norton	FRA -	IOM; 6	GER -	NED -	BEL -	SWE -	ULS -	NAT -	1	16th	0
