= Old pharmacy of Hedemora =

Listed yard in Dalarna county, Sweden

Coordinates: 60°16′47″N 15°59′11″E

The old pharmacy of Hedemora (Apoteket Gustaf Wasa) is a listed yard in Hedemora, Dalarna County, Sweden. It was probably built in 1779 by the merchant Eric Hult. It became pharmacy in 1849, when pharmacist C. A. Ruth bought the yard, and served as such until 1988. It was modified in 1897 after plans by architect Lars Israel Wahlman. Now (2017) the main building contains a café and a shop for building preservation equipment.

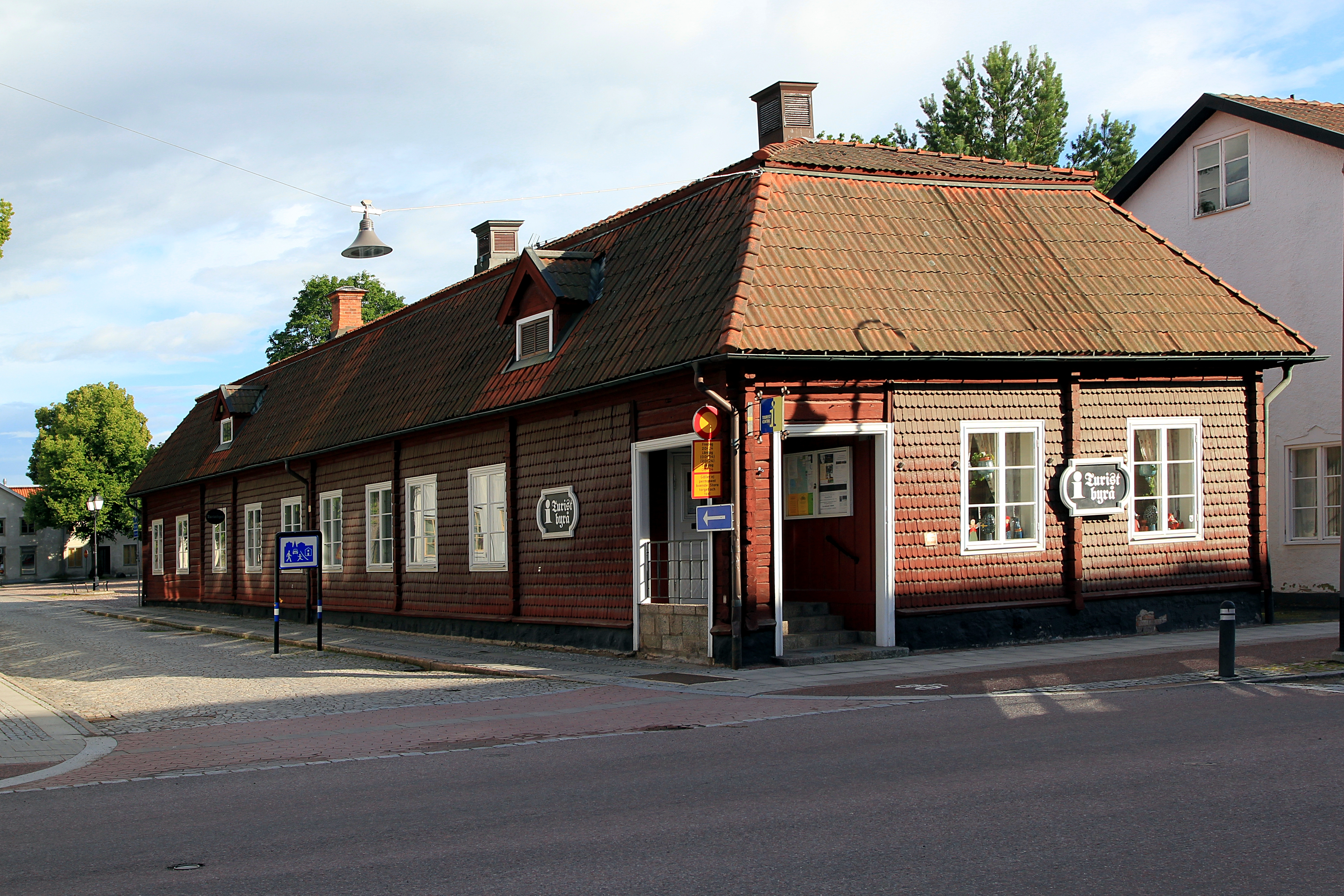

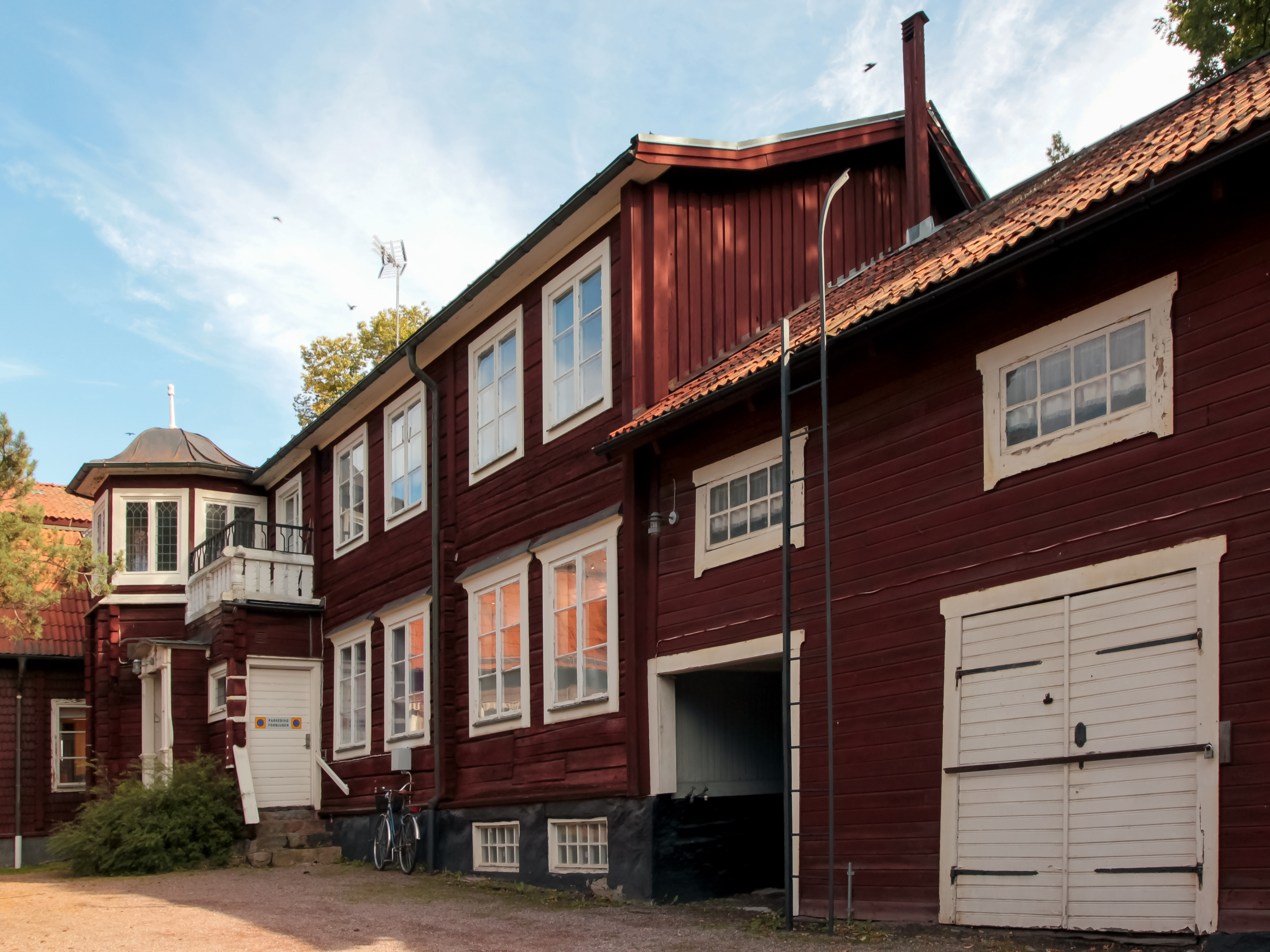

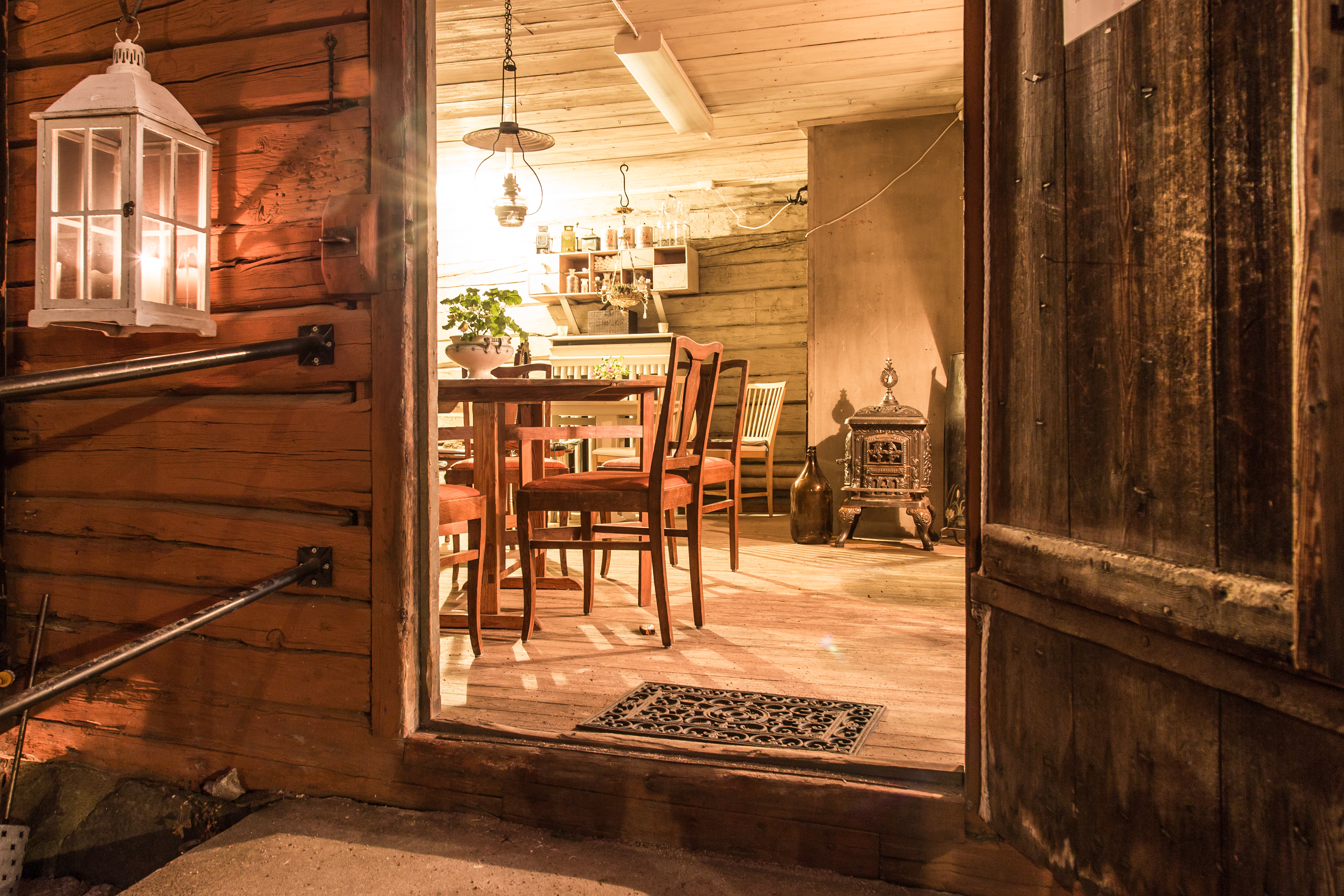
