= Järnhandelns hus, Hedemora =

Building in Hedemora, Sweden

Coordinates: 60°16′42.0″N 15°59′10.5″E

Järnhandelns hus
- Järnhandelns hus
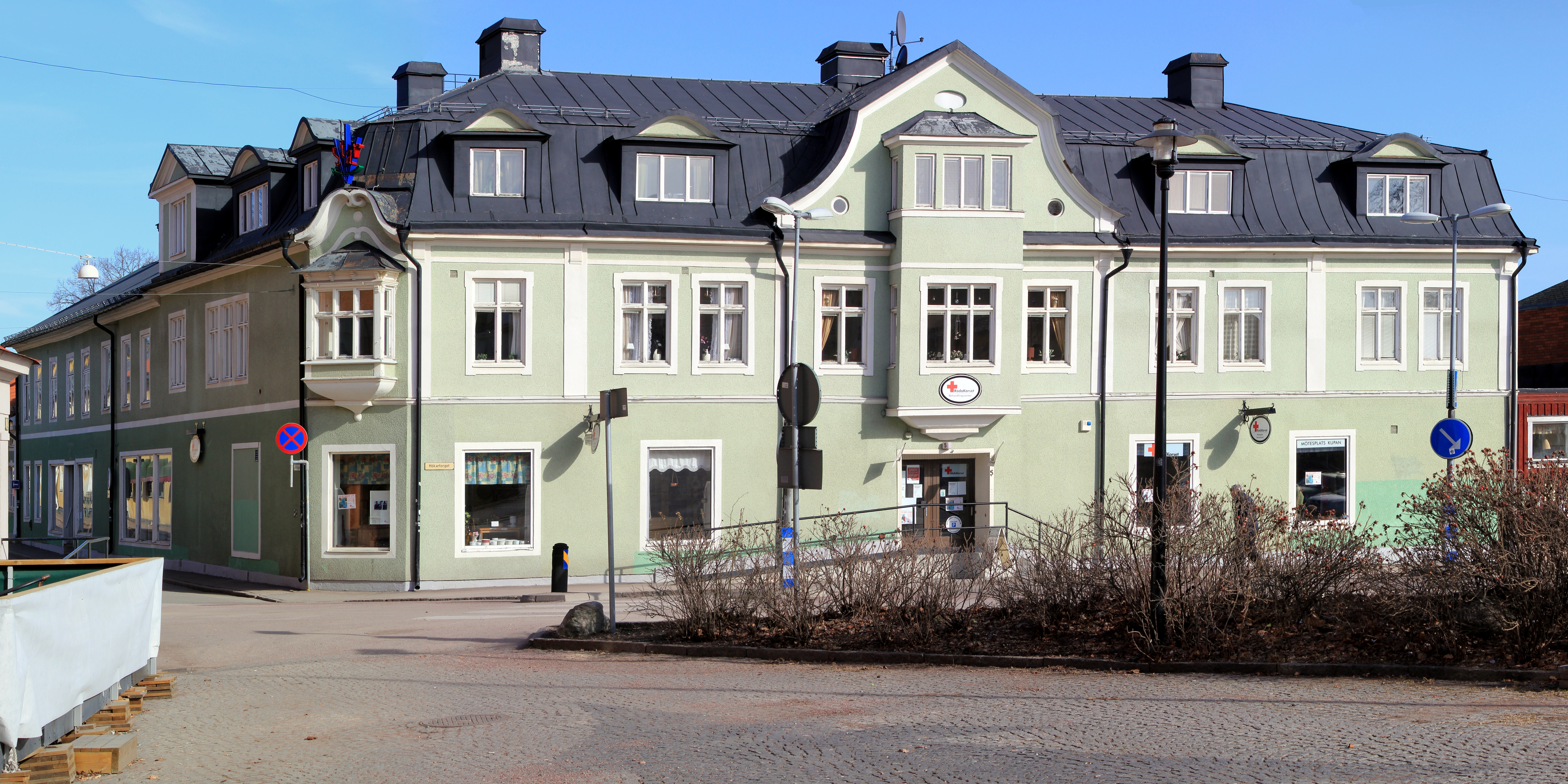
- Järnhandelns hus in 2012, at that time with the Red Cross in the venue.
- Interactive map of the Järnhandelns hus area
- Alternative names: Orren 2

General information
- Architectural style: Eclectic, neoclassical
- Location: Hedemora, Sweden, Sweden
- Construction started: 1905
- Completed: 1906

Design and construction
- Architect: Carl Johan Carlsson (Perne)

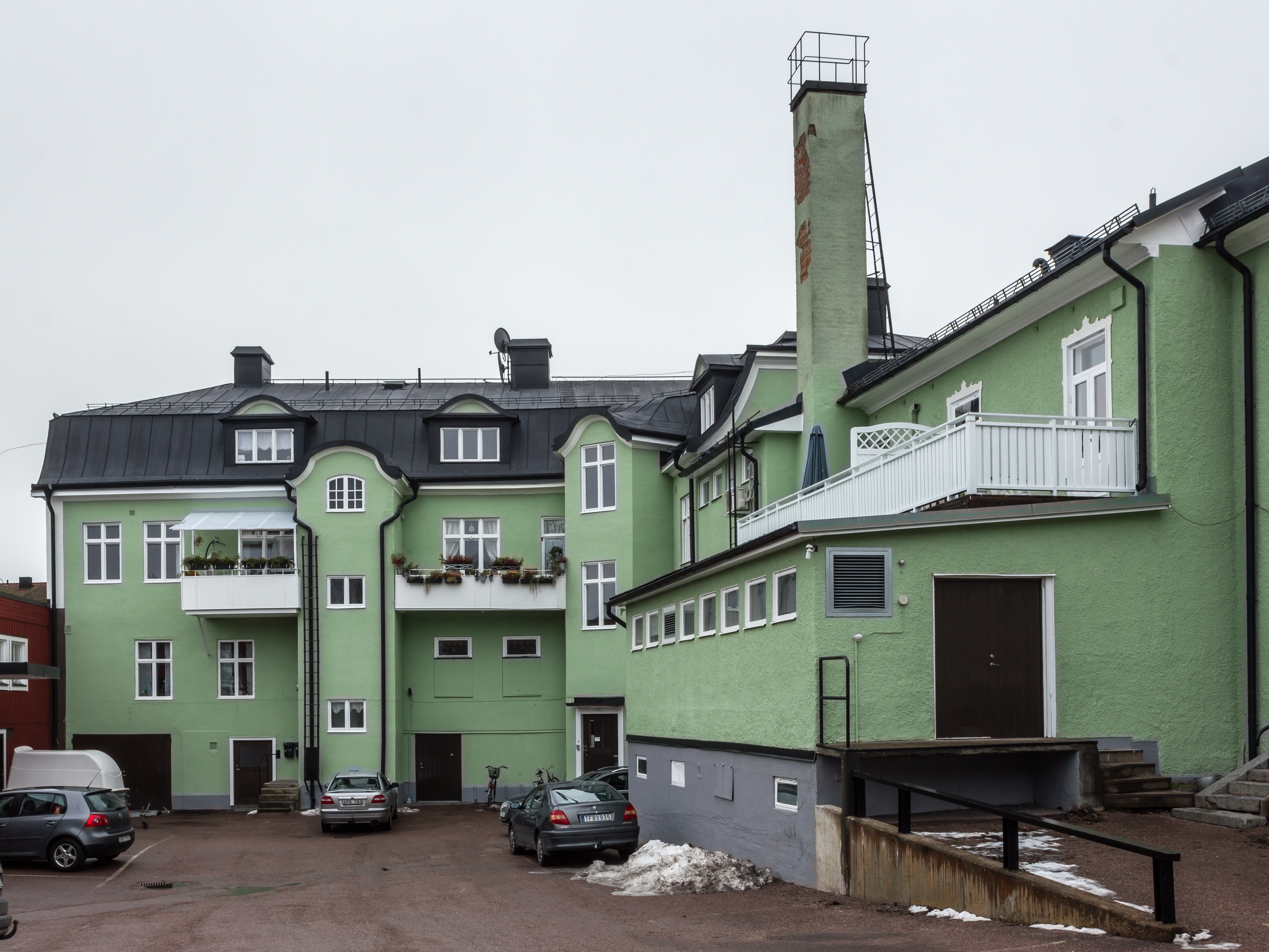
The back side of Järnhandelns hus.

Järnhandelns hus, also known as Gamla järnhandeln, is a building located in the block Orren in Hedemora, Dalarna County, Sweden. The building was erected 1905–1906 for ironmonger V. A. Grundin, after blueprints by Carl Johan Carlsson (Perne). The house has three floors and a basement. On the ground floor there were spaces for three stores and a further five rooms. On the two upper floors thirteen and eight rooms were located, and located around the house were a number of smaller spaces, such as bathrooms and porches. Many changes were made to the building, especially during the 1930s. In 1921 a vault was added in the premises of Lantmannabanken, designed by Perne. A water closet and a central heating system were installed 1930–1932.

In 1920 AB Dalabönder moved into the house, and their business was succeeded by Hedemora järn in the 1960s. In 1975 the ironmongery expanded its space by buying the premises that had been a men's outfitter. In 2001 the ironmongery moved to newly built premises. The Red Cross had a store and a café in the building until 2014. In January 2015 Södra Dalarnas Sparbank, that had been located at Åsgatan, moved into the house.

The frame is made out of timber, resting on a foundation of stone. The facades are cement rendered with plaster in a shade of green enfolded with white. The roof is mansard and hipped with numerous dormers and is covered in black plastic coated sheet. The facade used to be dressed in gray cement render and the roof was covered with red roofing tile.

The stockroom and warehouse of the ironmonger was expanded in 1946-1947, based on a blueprint by Julius Järnåker. In 1963 several changes were made to the house, among other things of the shops along Ämbetsgatan. The wing towards Ämbetsgatan was built in the late 1800s and was joined together with the hardware store when it was built. This building has a frame of timber and is also cement rendered with plaster in green. In the back a courtyard is formed, with the entrance towards Nygatan. Furthermore, there is a magazine which replaced a timbered row of outhouses, that were demolished during the demolitions that took place in 1963, 1964 and 1979.
