= Bruno Spaggiari =

Italian motorcycle racer (1933–2026)

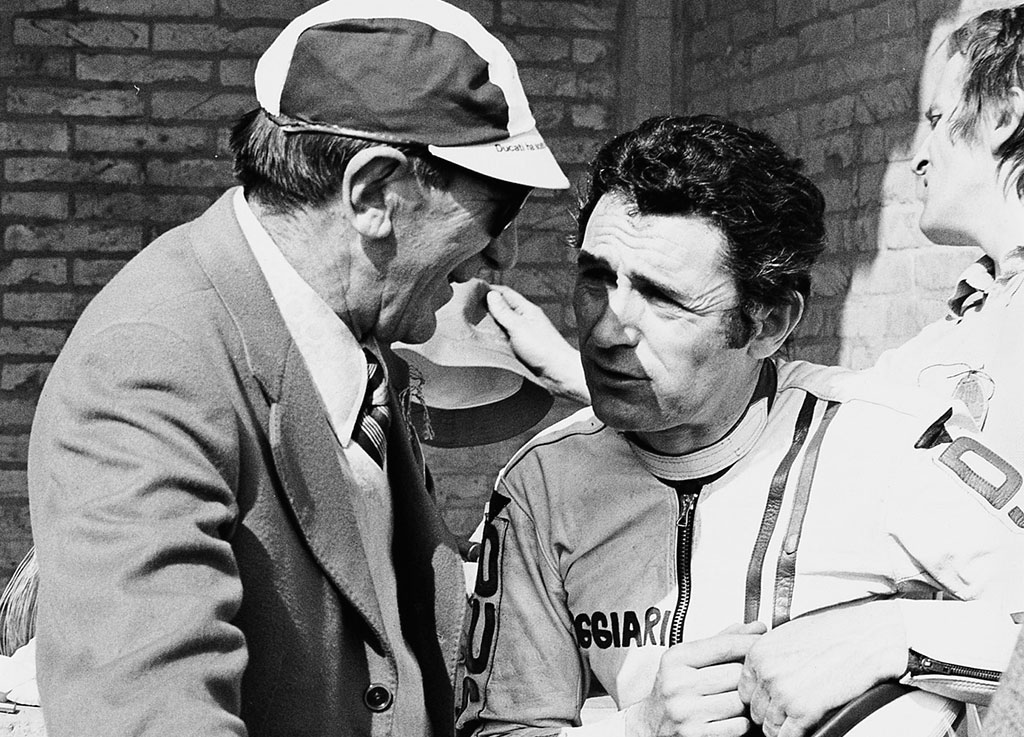
- Spaggiari (right) and Fabio Taglioni at the 1974 Imola 200
- Nationality: Italian
Motorcycle racing career statistics
Grand Prix motorcycle racing
Active years	1958 - 1960, 1965, 1968 - 1969, 1971 - 1972
First race	1958 125cc Nations Grand Prix
Last race	1972 500cc Nations Grand Prix
First win	1958 125cc Nations Grand Prix
Last win	1958 125cc Nations Grand Prix
Team	Ducati
Starts / Wins / Podiums / Poles / F. laps / Points; 10 / 1 / 4 / N/A / N/A / 43

Bruno Spaggiari (11 January 1933 – 23 October 2026) was an Italian Grand Prix motorcycle road racer.

== Biography ==
Bruno Spaggiari was born in Reggio Emilia on 11 January 1933. His best year was in 1960 when he finished fourth in the 125cc world championship. Spaggiari won the first Grand Prix he entered at the 1958 125cc Nations Grand Prix held at Monza, but he was never able to win another race.

Spaggiari appeared briefly as a character in the 2020 film Rose Island, portrayed by Marco Pancrazi.

Spaggiari died on 23 October 2026, at the age of 93.
