= 1958 Isle of Man TT =

Annual motorcycle racing event

The Isle of Man Tourist Trophy races have a history of over a hundred years, thanks in part to the demanding 37-mile high-speed track plus Mountain Course with bends, bumps, jumps, stone walls, manhole covers and telegraph poles, requiring skill and concentration. Held annually in the last week of May for practice and the first week of June for racing week with supporting attractions, gatherings and other events taking place.

For many years regarded as the most prestigious and oldest motorcycle race in the world, it has been reported as the most dangerous motorcycle road-race in the world. (From 1949 to 1976 the Isle of Man Tourist Trophy was part of the FIM Motorcycle Grand Prix World Championship prior to transfer to UK mainland over safety concerns.)

== 1958 Isle of Man Junior TT 350cc final standings ==
7 Laps (264.11 Miles) Mountain Course.

Place	Rider	Number	Country	Machine	Speed	Time	Points
1	(United Kingdom) John Surtees		Britain	MV Agusta	93.97 mph	2:48.38.4	8
2	(United Kingdom) Dave Chadwick		Britain	Norton	91.68 mph	2:52.50.6	6
3	(United Kingdom) Geoff Tanner		Britain	Norton	91.54 mph	2:53.06.4	4
4	(United Kingdom) Terry Shepherd		Britain	Norton	91.54 mph	2:53.06.6	3
5	(United Kingdom) George Catlin		Britain	Norton	90.86 mph	2:54.24.8	2
6	(Scotland) Alistair King		Britain	Norton	90.83 mph	2:54.24.4	1

== 1958 Isle of Man Lightweight TT 250cc final standings ==
10 Laps (107.90 miles) Clypse Course.

Place	Rider	Number	Country	Machine	Speed	Time	Points
1	(Italy) Tarquinio Provini		Italy	MV Agusta	76.89 mph	1:24.12.0	8
2	(Italy) Carlo Ubbiali		Italy	MV Agusta	76.77 mph	1:24.20.2	6
3	(United Kingdom) Mike Hailwood		Britain	NSU	74.30 mph	1:27.07.08	4
4	(Australia) Bob Brown		Australia	NSU	73.72 mph	1:27.48.8	3
5	(West Germany) Dieter Falk		West Germany	Adler	73.70 mph	1:27.50.04	2
6	(Northern Ireland) Sammy Miller		Britain	CZ	72.63 mph	1:29.08.8	1

== 1958 Isle of Man Lightweight TT 125cc final standings ==
10 Laps (107.90 miles) Clypse Course.

Place	Rider	Number	Country	Machine	Speed	Time	Points
1	(Italy) Carlo Ubbiali		Italy	MV Agusta	72.86 mph	1:28.51.2	8
2	(Italy) Romolo Ferri		Italy	Ducati	72.68 mph	1:29.04.0	6
3	(United Kingdom) Dave Chadwick		Britain	Ducati	71.56 mph	1:30.27.8	4
4	(Northern Ireland) Sammy Miller		Britain	Ducati	70.43 mph	1:35.55.2	3
5	(East Germany) Ernst Degner		East Germany	MZ	69.28 mph	1:33.27.0	2
6	(East Germany) Horst Fügner		East Germany	MZ	69.07 mph	1:33.43.8	1

== 1958 Sidecar TT final standings ==
10 Laps (107.90 miles) Clypse Course.

Place	Rider	Number	Country	Machine	Speed	Time	Points
1	(West Germany) Walter Schneider/H.Strauss	1	West Germany	BMW	73.01 mph	1:28.40.0	8
2	(Switzerland) Florian Camathias/H.Ceeco	23	Switzerland	BMW	72.11 mph	1:29.47.2	6
3	(United Kingdom) Jackie Beaton/E.Bulgin	24	Britain	Norton	67.63 mph	1:35.34.8	4
4	(West Germany) Alwyn Ritter/E.Blauth	5	West Germany	BMW	67.23 mph	1:36.17.8	3
5	(United Kingdom) E.Walker/D.G.Roberts	11	Britain	Norton	64.56 mph	1:30.15.2	2
6	(United Kingdom) P.Woollett/G.H.Loft	9	Britain	Norton	63.06 mph	1:34.24.2	1

== 1958 Isle of Man Senior TT 500cc final standings ==
Friday 18 June 1958 – 7 Laps (274.11 miles) Mountain Course.

Place	Rider	Number	Country	Machine	Speed	Time	Points
1	(United Kingdom) John Surtees		Britain	MV Agusta	98.63 mph	2:38.49.8	8
2	(United Kingdom) Bob Anderson		Britain	Norton	95.40 mph	2:46.06.0	6
3	(Australia) Bob Brown		Australia	Norton	95.24 mph	2:46.22.2	4
4	(United Kingdom) Derek Minter		Britain	Norton	94.86 mph	2:47.03.2	3
5	(United Kingdom) Dave Chadwick		Britain	Norton	94.74 mph	2:47.15.4	2
6	(United Kingdom) John Anderson		Britain	Norton	94.34 mph	2:47.58.8	1
