= Ernst Hiller =

German motorcycle racer

- Nationality: German
Motorcycle racing career statistics
Grand Prix motorcycle racing
Active years	1955–1958, 1961, 1970–1973
First race	1956 500cc Dutch TT
Last race	1973 500cc Finnish Grand Prix
Team	BMW
Starts / Wins / Podiums / Poles / F. laps / Points; 14 / 0 / 2 / N/A / N/A / 56

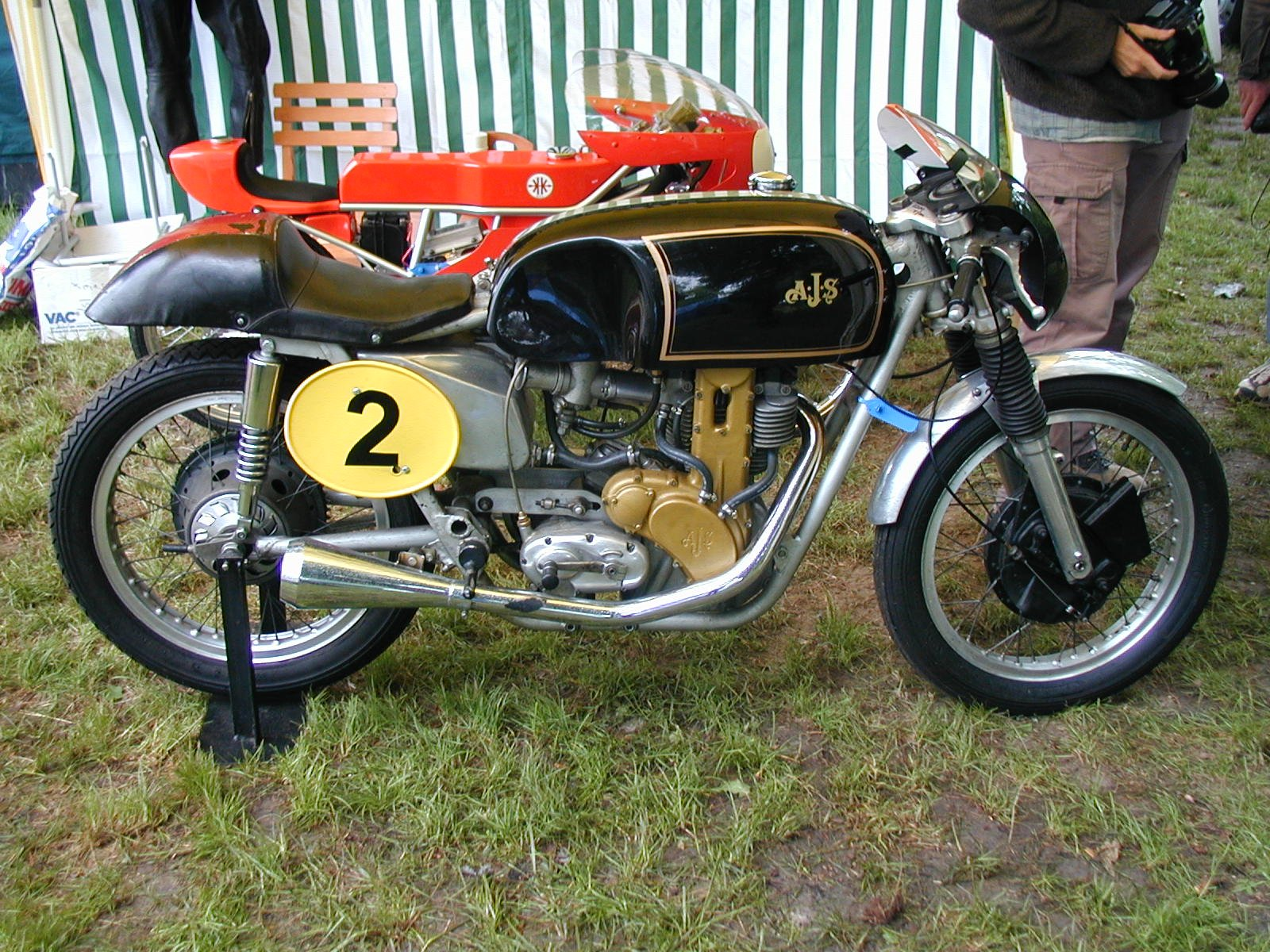

Ernst Hiller (19 November 1928 – 27 February 2008) was a German former Grand Prix motorcycle road racer. His best year was in 1958 when he finished the season in seventh place in the 500cc world championship.
