= Hedemora gammelgård =

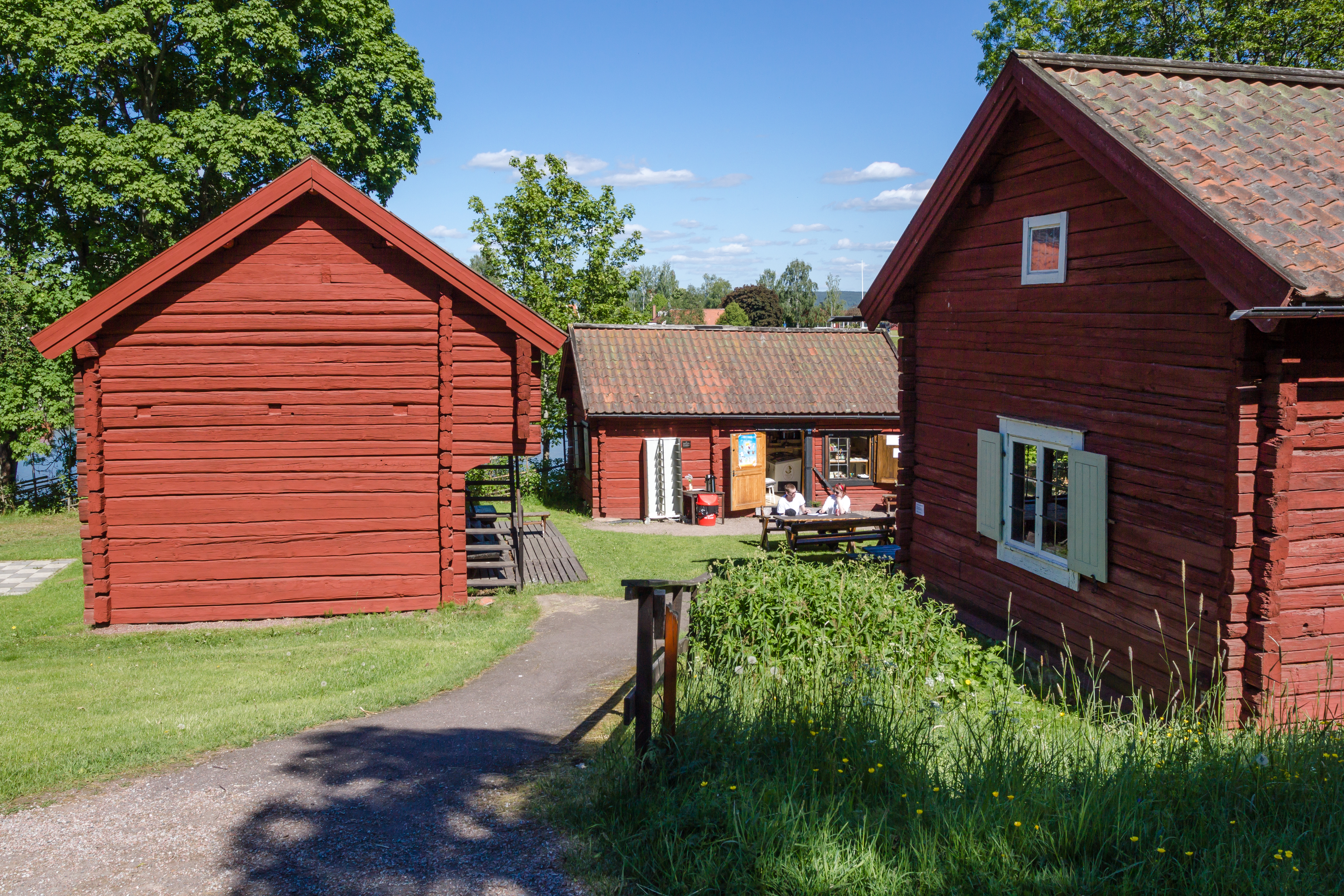
- Established: 12 June 1915
- Location: Hedemora, Sweden
- Coordinates: 60°17′3″N 15°58′41″E
- Type: Local museum
- Founder: Karl Trotzig et al.
- Owner: Föreningen Hedemora Gammelgård
- Public transit access: Bus stop Gammelgården or Prostgården
- Parking: At the ridge plateau
- Website: Hedemoragammelgard.se, in English

Hedemora gammelgård is a local museum in Hedemora, Dalarna County, Sweden, located at the Badelundaåsen slope towards lake Hönsan.

The museum was established June 12, 1915, which is one year before the national association for farmstead museums, Sveriges hembygdsförbund was established.

The museum consists of buildings from the surrounding area and resembles a typical farmstead in Dalarna of the 18th century. The oldest building is a threshing barn built in 1679 and moved to Hedemora gammelgård in 1920. The first building moved to the museum, in 1908, was a residential building called Storstugan. Altogether the museum consists of twelve buildings, excluding the restrooms, of which eight were present at the opening 1915.

Buildings
Image	Description	Coordinates	Commons category
	The threshing barn, from 1679, is the oldest building at Hedemora gammelgård. The barn comes from Övernora in Husby parish, and came to Gammelgården in 1920. It consists of three rooms and attic. Nowadays the barn is a small museum for showing e.g. antique farm implements, wagons and fire equipment.	60°17′3″N 15°58′41″E	Trösklogen, Hedemora gammelgård
	The lofthouse, probably from the 1600s, comes from Björsjö of Grytnäs parish and was moved to Gammelgården in 1909. The building consists of four rooms, showing a shoemaker workshop, a carpenter shop, a milk room and a clothing- and weaving room.	60°17′2.74″N 15°58′41.71″E	Loftboden, Hedemora gammelgård
	The brewhouse, now used as the kitchen of the cafe, was originally built in 1745 and comes from Mälby in Hedemora parish. I was moved to the gammelgård 1914-1915 and consists of sters (kitchen for brewing and baking) and a maid's apartment.	60°17′2.63″N 15°58′42.4″E	Bryggstugan, Hedemora gammelgård
	Storstugan ("The large cabin") from 1776, have previously been in Vikbyn outside Hedemora and was the first building of the museum homestead. The house, a so called parstuga, has entrance and a closet in the centre and two symmetrical rooms, one in each direction. The fireplace heats the living area and the closet, and the unheated room is for feasts.	60°17′2.2″N 15°58′41.61″E	Storstugan, Hedemora gammelgård
	The portlider (port=gate;lider=carriage house), with stable and carriage house on each side of the entrance to the farm, comes from Klackens by in Säter parish and was moved to Gammelgården 1914-1915. A weather vane marked 1764 was previously places on the roof. The building contains i.e. old horse harnesses and agricultural tools.	60°17′1.74″N 15°58′42.81″E	Portlidret, Hedemora gammelgård
	The forge, probably from the 1700s, is a scythe forge from Davidshyttan and was in place at the opening 1915. The building has a preserved interior and is sometimes used to show the forging process. In the forge are several antique forging tools and various forgings.	60°17′1.6″N 15°58′44.0″E	Smedjan, Hedemora gammelgård
	The kiln from 1757 was also present at the inauguration in 1915. The building was used for the drying of flax and grain, and comes from the Örjasgården in Västerby.	60°17′0.6″N 15°58′44.2″E	Bastun, Hedemora gammelgård
	The härbre, probably from the 1600s, comes from Skommargården in the village Ivarshyttan north of Hedemora and was moved to Hedemora gammelgård in 1914–1915.	60°17′1.2″N 15°58′42.1″E	Härbret, Hedemora gammelgård
	The flax store was originally placed at the street Långgatan at the Main Square in Hedemora. It was moved to Gammelgården in 1916. The store was used by farmers from Hälsingland whom, during the early 1800s, traveled to the winter market in Hedemora to sell flax and other products. The building type was in operation as market stalls until the early 1900s.	60°17′0.5″N 15°58′41.0″E	Linboden, Hedemora gammelgård
	Dalska stugan (Da[h]l's cottage) was also a flax store from the 1800s. The cottage was Elin Dahl's summer home in Svensbo nearby Backa, and was donated to the Association Hedemora Gammelgård (Föreningen Hedemora Gammelgård) in connection with the celebration of the would-be 100th birthday of founding father Karl Trotzig.	60°17′2.7″N 15°58′39.6″E	Dalska stugan, Hedemora gammelgård
	The bakehouse is a former threshing barn from Ivarshyttan. It was put in place in 1998 and is rented out for tunnbröd baking.	60°17′4.2″N 15°58′37.9″E	Bagarstugan, Hedemora gammelgård
	Körlogen (köra=drive;loge=a type of barn) is a former barn with doors large enough to let a horse cart in and out. The building was erect at Hedemora gammelgård in 1992-1994 and comes, like the härbre, from Skommargården in Ivarshyttan.	60°17′4.8″N 15°58′39.5″E	Körlogen, Hedemora gammelgård
