= Little Misfortune =

2019 dark fantasy adventure video game

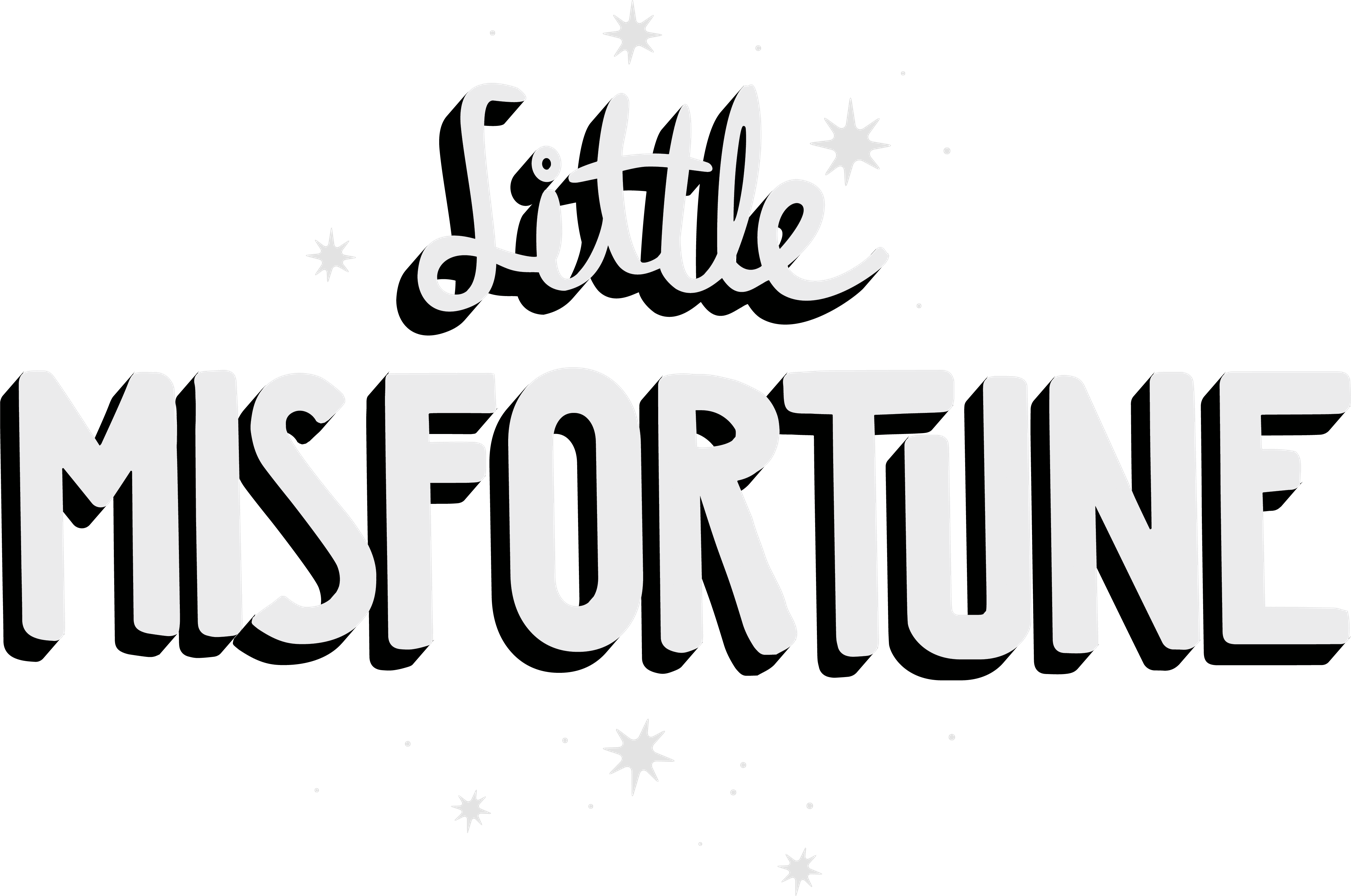
- Developer: Killmonday Games
- Publisher: Killmonday Games
- Designer: Natalia Martinsson
- Programmers: Isak Martinsson; Harald Wallin; Anton Bergman
- Artist: Natalia Martinsson
- Writers: Isak Martinsson; Natalia Martinsson
- Composer: Isak Martinsson
- Engine: Unity
- Platform: Linux; macOS; Microsoft Windows; Android; iOS; Nintendo Switch
- Release: Linux, macOS, Windows; September 18, 2019; Android, iOS; February 13, 2020; PS4, Xbox One, Nintendo Switch; May 29, 2020
- Genres: Adventure, Horror
- Mode: Single-player

Little Misfortune is a 2019 horror adventure video game developed and published by the independent Swedish studio Killmonday Games. It released for Linux, macOS, and Windows on September 18, 2019, for Android and iOS on February 13, 2020, and for PlayStation 4, Xbox One, and Nintendo Switch on May 29, 2020. Set in the same universe as Fran Bow, the game's titular character is Misfortune, an eight-year-old girl with a childlike naivety and a dark sense of humor. Misfortune, a self-described "little lady", is guided by a voice in her head, which she names Mr. Voice, in a game to seek the prize of eternal happiness for her mother. She is smitten with Benjamin, a non-verbal anthropomorphic fox whom Mr. Voice strongly warns Misfortune against interacting with.

Despite its initial child-friendly introduction, Misfortune quickly finds herself exposing or being exposed to numerous elements of shock humor, including death, alcoholism, substance abuse, suicide, nudity, profanity, grave robbery, strip clubs, demons, traffic collisions, cruelty to animals, and the grim reaper.

The titular character Misfortune is voiced by the game's writer, designer, and artist, Natalia Martinsson, who worked alongside husband Isak Martinsson to create the game, as Henrik Norman voices Mr. Voice, the game's narrator and antagonist. Little Misfortune received mostly mixed reviews from critics.

== Gameplay ==
Set in a 2.5D perspective, the player may only move forward or backwards. At certain points in the game the player has to make choices for Misfortune, which may trigger special animated cutscenes. The game will also prompt the player to guide Misfortune's hand to perform certain actions or play minigames, such as fixing a broken vase or playing Whac-A-Mole.

== Plot ==
Set in 1993, (Note: A newspaper can be discovered that shows the date as 1993.) eight-year-old Misfortune Ramirez Hernandez lives a sad, lonely life with her abusive parents on the outskirts of the fictional town of Openfields, Sweden. (Note: All signs are in Swedish.) The narrator announces that today is the day that Misfortune will die, and is surprised when Misfortune says that she can hear him. The narrator, whom Misfortune calls Mr. Voice, invites Misfortune to play a game wherein she will make choices where "there is no right or wrong, only consequences", and for which the prize is eternal happiness. Misfortune accepts, hoping to win the prize for her mother, and Mr. Voice begins the game by asking her to leave the house. Following his prompts, Misfortune is guided through the streets of Openfields, encountering an anthropomorphic fox, whom she calls Benjamin, several times, who flees when she gets too close. Mr. Voice warns her against interacting with him.

Pursuing Benjamin, Misfortune discovers a book that explains that Mr. Voice is an other-dimensional being named "Morgo". Benjamin is evidently a "protector" who strives to protect children from Morgo but is forbidden from interacting with them directly. Escaping Morgo, Misfortune finds herself in her front yard, seeing her own corpse having been run over by a car, meaning that she has been a ghost for most of the journey. Benjamin leads her through a portal to the Fourth Reality where she encounters death, who had been expecting her. If Misfortune sprinkles glitter on 16 selected objects in the midst of the game, another ending will play where her mother receives Misfortune's happiness, takes off her mask and smiles.

== Development ==
By the end of 2015, Killmonday had completed their first game, Fran Bow. It had been greenlit and was to be released on Steam. It had taken much more time than anticipated and Killmonday Games were out of money. The sales of the game were crucial for them to be able to continue developing. After the success of Fran Bow, Killmonday started working on their then "secret game", which would later become Little Misfortune.

On 11 July 2018, Killmonday announced the title of their new game. In the following months updates on the progress of the game were uploaded to their YouTube channel, by the time of the release they had uploaded 26 weekly updates. On 2 September Killmonday announced that the game would be released in just a little under three weeks, on 18 September 2019. The day before the release, it was announced that owners of Fran Bow would receive a 10% discount on Little Misfortune.

== Reception ==
Reception

Aggregate scores
Aggregator	Score
Metacritic	PC: 57/100
OpenCritic	78/100; 50% Critics Recommend

Review score
Publication	Score
TouchArcade	3.5/5

Little Misfortune received mixed reviews from critics, who praised the game's art style and thematic aspects but criticised the game's lack of gameplay, mishandling of certain themes such as the naivety of children, and relatively short length. On Metacritic the game has a score of 57 out of 100, indicating "mixed or average reviews".

CD-Action gave the game a 45/100, writing "The story made me uneasy not because I thought: 'those are the kind of things that shouldn't be said out loud' but because I thought: it's unsettling how poorly it is written, how badly they depicted a child's naivety and how everything is just too over the top."

Rock, Paper, Shotgun gave the game a mixed review, saying "some topics, like abuse, underpin the entire narrative and broadly work to give it a grounding in true unpleasantness. But others, like suicide, feel tossed in for shock value before never being addressed again. That feeling isn't helped by the tonal mismatch that places these adult fears alongside much more juvenile humour. Jamming a poop joke after an instance of animal death does little but ensure that they trip one another up, where landing one on its feet alone was already tricky."

Kotaku gave the game a more positive review, saying "While Little Misfortune's adventure isn't long (it took me about 2.5 hours to emerge from the other side), it is very meaningful. Misfortune is a bundle of pure joy, and she's a delight to spend time with, even if her adventures come to an abrupt end. While Misfortune breezes and bluffs her way past the darker parts of her story, including a journey through a racy hamster nightclub, players will be all too aware of the sinister world that she dances in."

Adventure Gamers gave the game 3.5 out of 5 praising the game's voice acting and story, while criticizing lack of interactivity and moderation in "over-the-top awfulness".

GamersPack gave the game a positive review saying "The game might be a little light on challenges or traditional gameplay, but it's full of (dark) humor and heart. Little Misfortune continues along the same grim path Killmonday Games started on with Fran Bow, so if you're into the mix of the cute and the macabre, this one is for you."
