= Hedemora Circuit =

Defunct Swedish motorsport race track

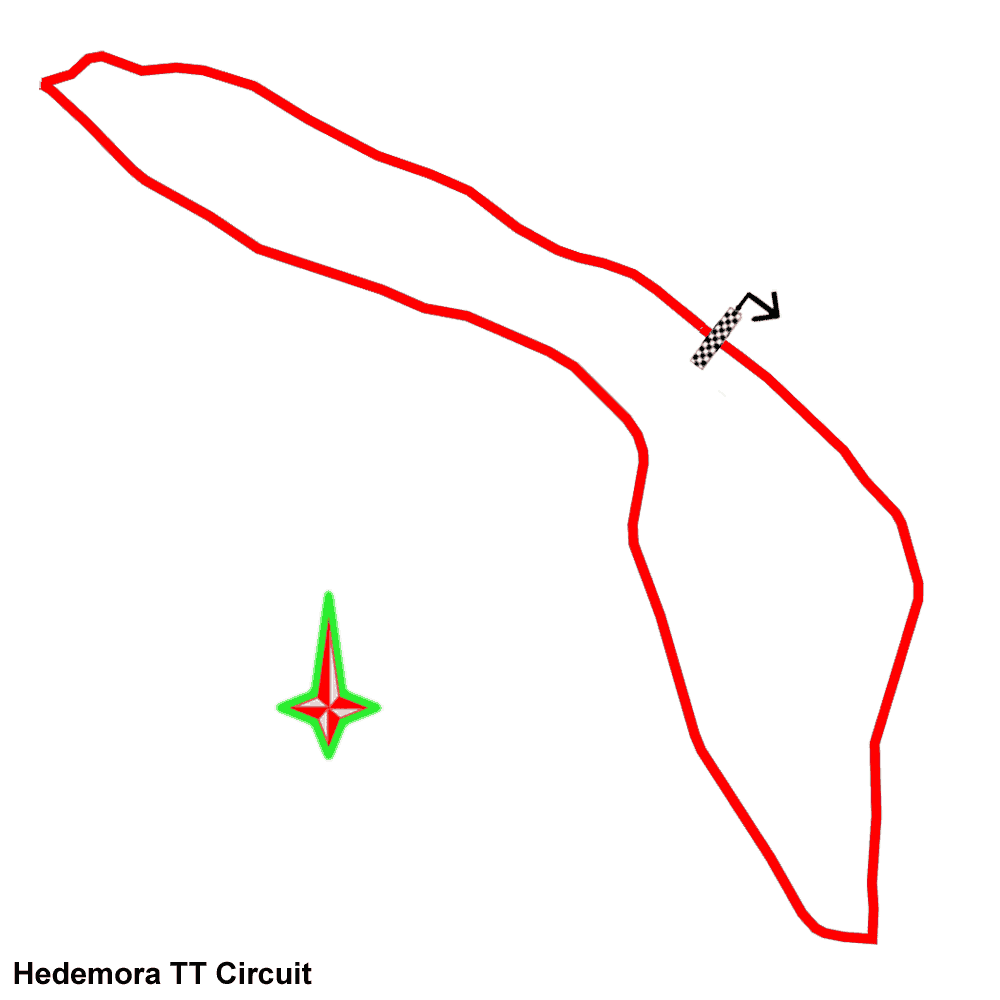
- Location: Hedemora, Sweden
- Coordinates: 60°17′49.2″N 15°58′4.8″E
- Opened: 1933 (re-opened 1949)
- Closed: 1999 (firstly closed 1934)
- Major events: Grand Prix motorcycle racing Swedish motorcycle Grand Prix (1958)
- Length: 7.265 km (4.514 mi)
- Turns: 11 (6 right, 5 left)

Hedemora Circuit was a motorsport race track located in Hedemora, Sweden. In 1958, it hosted the first Swedish motorcycle Grand Prix of MotoGP.

The circuit closed in 1999.
