= Terry Shepherd =

British motorcycle racer

- Nationality: (United Kingdom) British
Motorcycle racing career statistics
Grand Prix motorcycle racing
Active years	1957 – 1959
First race	1957 500cc West German Grand Prix
Last race	1959 500cc Ulster Grand Prix
Starts / Wins / Podiums / Poles / F. laps / Points; 9 / 0 / 2 / N/A / N/A / 17

Terry Shepherd (?–2012) was a British Grand Prix motorcycle road racer. His best season was in 1958 when he finished the year in eighth place in the 350cc world championship.

Shepherd died on 5 October 2012.
