= Fran Bow =

2015 video game

FranBow
- The official logo
- Developer: Killmonday Games
- Publisher: Killmonday Games
- Designer: Natalia Martinsson
- Composer: Isak Martinsson
- Engine: GameMaker Studio
- Platforms: Microsoft Windows, OS X, Linux, Android, iOS, Xbox Series X/S, Xbox One, Nintendo Switch, PlayStation 4
- Release: Windows, OS X, Linux; August 27, 2015; Android; February 16, 2016 iOS; March 5, 2016; Xbox Series X/S, Xbox One, Switch, PS4; April 28, 2023
- Genre: Point-and-click adventure
- Mode: Single-player

Fran Bow is a 2015 graphic adventure game with psychological horror elements developed and produced by Killmonday Games, a Swedish indie game studio. The game was released in 2015 for PC and in 2016 for mobile. In 2023, it was ported to the Xbox Series X/S, Xbox One, Nintendo Switch and PlayStation 4.

== Gameplay ==
The gameplay consists of a third-person point-and-click adventure. Bloody eyeballs appear on both sides of the screen and take Fran into different rooms in their respective position when clicked. Sometimes, clicking an object can result in the protagonist commenting on it, with multiple descriptions for the same item. Some items will be sent to her inventory. Players can interact with collected objects in three ways: use, examine, or combine. Fran can also talk to certain characters, occasionally with the option of choosing between different dialogue options.

In one scene, the player controls the protagonist's cat. Additionally, a small portion of Fran Bow consists of minigames situated within the broader narrative that present more complex logical challenges.

== Plot ==
Fran Bow standing next to her bed in Oswald Asylum

The story takes place in 1944, over the course of five chapters. It centers around Fran, a ten-year-old girl with a happy family. One day, a monster appears and she finds her parents brutally dismembered. The girl flees from her house, only to collapse in the nearby woods and be brought into Oswald Asylum. Now she has to deal with her mental condition, as well as being separated from her black cat, and only friend, Mr. Midnight.

=== Chapter 1 ===
Fran is distressed during her time in the asylum, denying mental issues and asking for her kitty. Under the care of psychiatrist Dr. Deern, she is administered Duotine pills, an experimental drug to treat her "madness". It causes vivid hallucinations of a phantasmagoric parallel universe, filling the room with blood, mutilated bodies and shadowy entities. The side effects make the doctor decide to stop the treatment, but Fran's visions tell her she needs the pills in order to escape and reunite with her beloved cat.

In multiple instances, an evil creature with horns, called Remor, appears with the apparent intent to taunt and torment the young girl. Ultimately she is able to get out of her imprisonment, by fleeing into a nocturnal forest in which she encounters ghostly nature spirits.

=== Chapter 2 ===
She finds Mr. Midnight, but they end up trapped together in a haunted house that belongs to conjoined twins named Clara and Mia Buhalmet. The sisters claim they want Fran to complete a ritual to separate them. The young girl eventually tricks the two, takes her cat and escapes. When the girl attempts to cross a bridge of roots, it frays and collapses.

=== Chapter 3 ===
Fran awakens to discover that she has been transformed into a tree in a brighter world called Ithersta, a land where vegetables, insects, pine cones, and roots live in harmony. There she meets Palontras who helps her return home.

=== Chapter 4 ===
After departing Ithersta, Fran meets Itward, a giant skeletal creature. She discovers that it was Itward who had helped her in her search for Mr. Midnight. Itward tries to take Fran back home in his flying machine. While in the flying machine, Itward throws a surprise party for Fran's eleventh birthday.

However, the flying machine is sabotaged into crashing by evil spirits, and Fran Bow and Itward are separated. Fran awakens near her home where she is taken away by Dr. Deern. After visiting Fran's parents' grave, Remor appears and captures them.

=== Chapter 5 ===
She is trapped in a hell-like dimension, ruled by Remor's mother, Mabuka. It is revealed Fran's aunt, Grace, and Dr. Oswald, who experimented on Grace and Fran's mother, had Remor possess Fran to murder her parents believing Fran's suffering is key to his experiment. After Oswald shoots her, Itward and Palontras come to save Fran, killing Grace and Oswald. After being revived, Fran, Mr. Midnight, Itward, and Palontras fly away with Fran resolving to be happy despite everything.

== Development and release ==
Fran Bow was developed by Swedish studio Killmonday Games, composed of Natalia Martinsson (née Figueroa) and Isak Martinsson. The plot of the game includes several elements from Natalia's life as a child and teenager. She recounts being a witness to family violence, part of a religious sect and exposed to many different medications as attempts to treat her mental condition. According to her, the process of creating the game felt "therapeutic", since it allowed her to expose important personal experiences (both positive and negative). She also mentioned a desire to make the puzzles a seamless part of the story, in a way that felt connected and complex.

According to Natalia, the initial goal for the Indiegogo crowdfunding campaign was 20,000 dollars. However, despite obtaining 28,000 dollars, the team realized it was still not enough to comfortably develop the game. It forced them to be very mindful of their spending, an experience she called "illuminating". When the resources were almost exhausted, Isak's grandfather passed away and some of the inherited money was dedicated to the project. She describes the later portion of development as especially stressful.

Fran Bow was released on August 27, 2015 for PC. It received mobile ports in 2016: in February 16 for Android and March 5 for iOS. In 2023 it became available for Xbox Series X/S, Xbox One, Nintendo Switch and PlayStation 4.

== Reception ==
Reception

Aggregate scores
Aggregator	Score
GameRankings	70%
Metacritic	70/100
OpenCritic	61/100

Review scores
Publication	Score
Adventure Gamers	4/5
RiotPixels	53/100

Adam Smith, writing for Rock, Paper, Shotgun, gave the game a positive review, describing it as a game that "sits alongside Wonderland and Oz – imaginative, strange, unsettling, intelligent and charged with a rare and beautiful sense of hope". Smith felt, however, that some plot threads were not satisfactorily concluded. Joel Couture, in an article for Gamasutra, used Fran Bow to discuss the merits of an ambiguous ending; Figueroa responded that she preferred to "give the answers in a metaphorical way", allowing players to interpret those signals through their own experiences.

=== Sales ===
Fran Bow sold 10,000 copies in its first month.

== Accolades ==
Year	Event	Category	Result	Reference
2015	IndieDB Indie of the Year Awards (Editors' Choice)	Creativity Award	Won	
2016	Aggie Awards	Best Character - Fran Bow	Nominated	
2016	Aggie Awards	Best Character (Readers' Choice) - Fran Bow	Runner-up	
2016	Aggie Awards	Silver Aggie	Honourable mention	

== Related games ==
Fran Bow has a non-canonical appearance in The Sorrowvirus: A Faceless Short Story as an animated doll, used with the permission of Killmonday Games.

On September 3, 2025, during Killmonday’s 10th anniversary Afterlive stream, an untitled follow-up game was officially announced. It will serve as a crossover between Fran Bow and Killmonday’s other game Little Misfortune, which is set in the same universe.
