= Ore-pine =

Cured pinewood

Ore-pine (Norwegian: malmfuru; Swedish: kärnfuru; Danish: malmfyr; Icelandic: málmfura) is a cured pinewood used extensively in the Middle Ages in the construction of Scandinavian stave churches. Ore-pine is the heartwood of prepared old-growth mountain pines; the trees had their tops and branches removed and were left to stand for another fifteen to twenty years, the tree resins bleeding upward and out through the cut branches and thus making the heartwood more resinous. The resultant ore-pine is much more resistant to rot and decay, as evidenced by stave churches surviving from the 12th and 13th centuries.
