= Honda racing motorcycles =

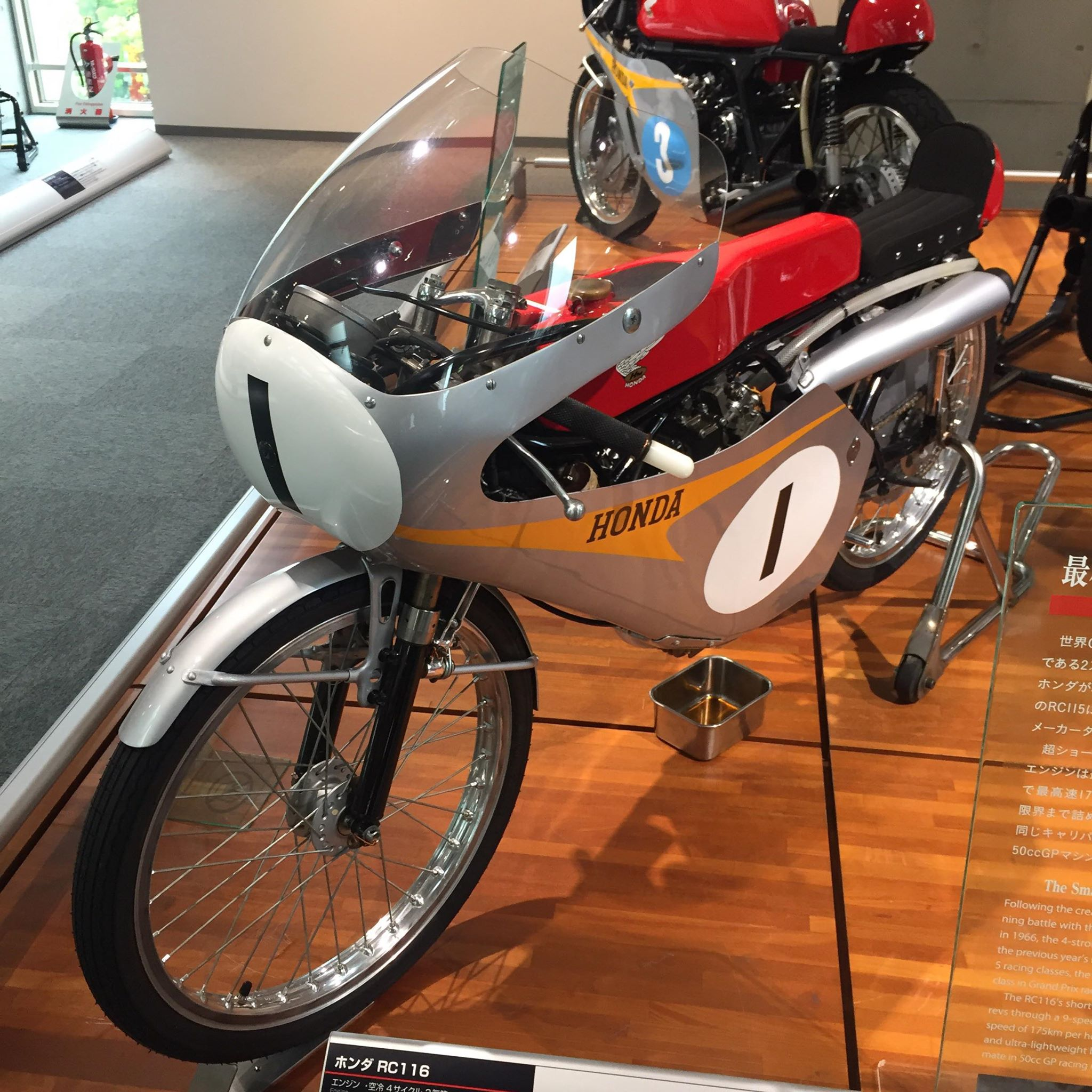
Honda RC116 display at Honda Collection Hall in Motegi

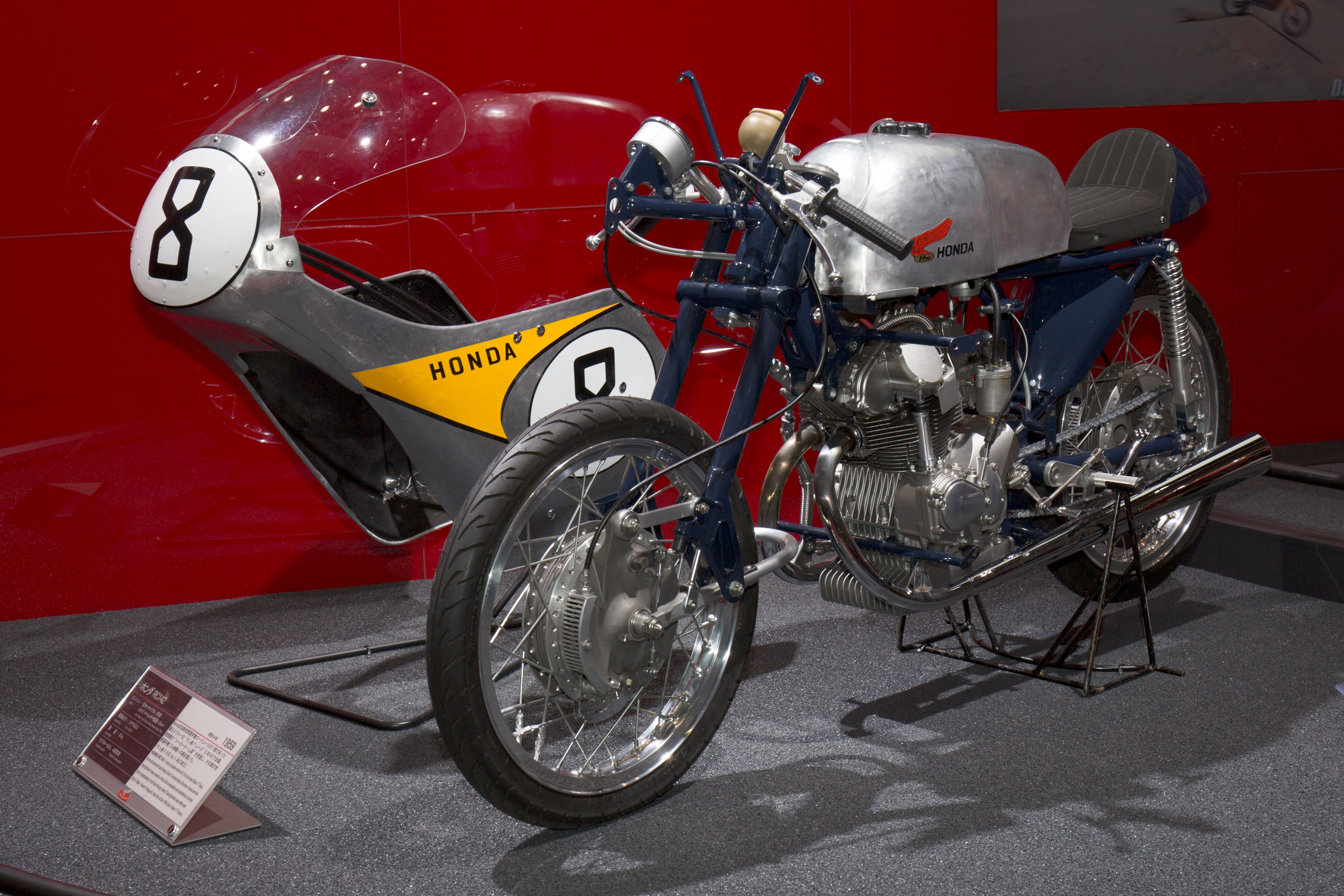
Honda RC142 display at the 2013 Tokyo Motor Show

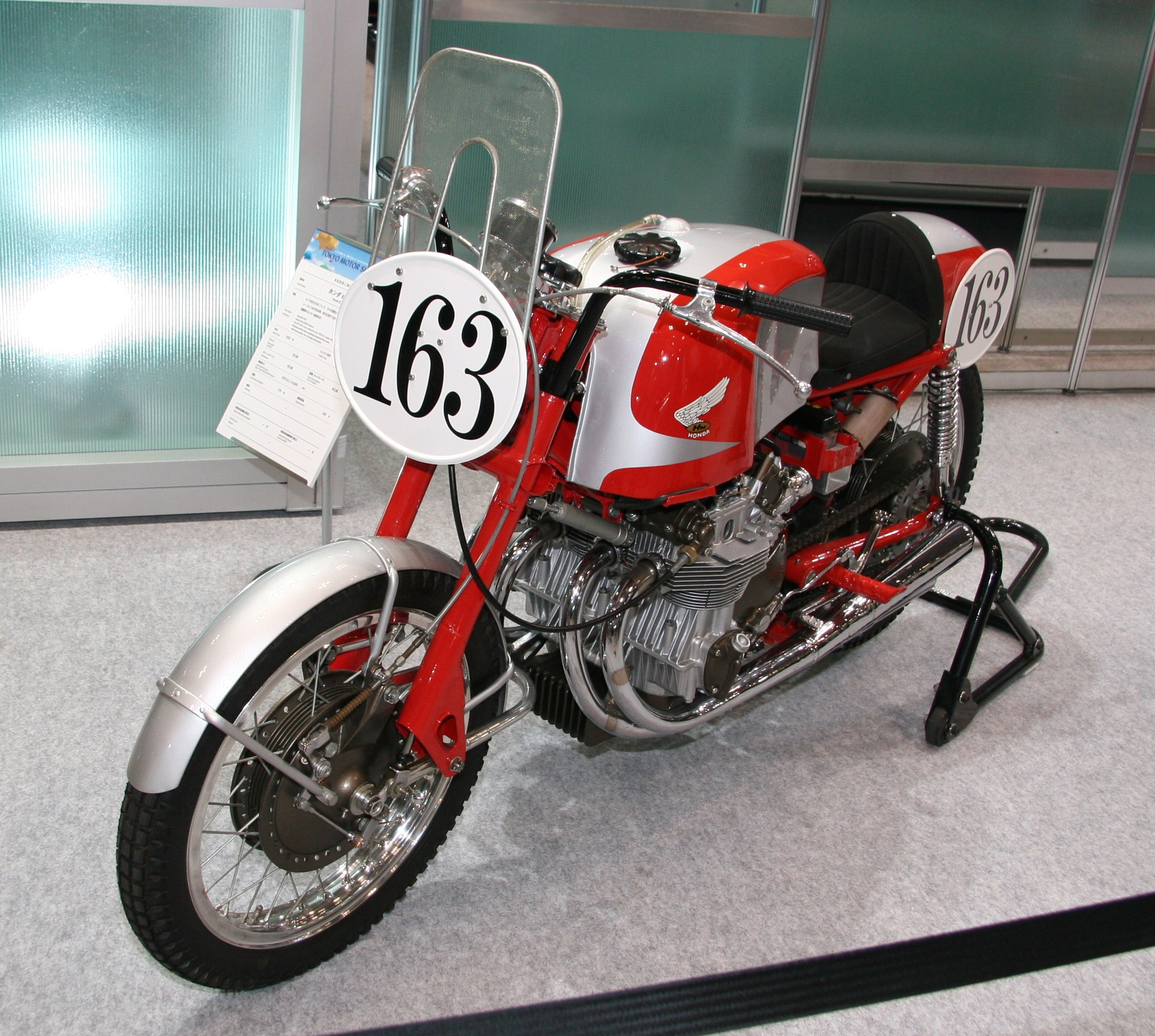
Honda RC160 display at the 2009 Tokyo Motor Show

The large majority of works racing motorcycles manufactured by the motorcycle racing division of Honda of Japan, currently called Honda Racing Corporation (HRC, previously called the Racing Service Center), carry the iconic prefix RC.

== History ==
=== History of the RC name ===
Use of the RC name stretches from Honda's entry onto the international motorcycle Grand Prix stage in 1959 to the present day. In recent years Honda has also used the RC prefix as a marketing device and applied it to certain production motorcycles that had been created for racing homologation purposes. For works Motocross bikes, there was an additional M suffix.

In the late 1980s, Honda began to enter its production motorcycles in various Superbike, or production-based, racing series, such as the new FIM Superbike World Championship. The most successful of these was the VFR750R, which eventually became better known by its model number, RC30. However, the VFR750R was a Honda production motorcycle, not an HRC race bike, and the fact that its model number also began with the "RC" prefix was a coincidence, rather than a continuation of the HRC model naming tradition.

== List of Honda HRC racing motorcycles ==
Honda Racing Motorcycles
Model	Model years	Engine Configuration	Bore x Stroke	Engine Displacement	Transmission	Other information
CR93	1961–1962	Twin		125 cc		DOHC, 4 valves per cylinder
NR500	1979	V-4		498-500 cc		8 valves per cylinder, oval pistons
NS500	1982–1983	V-3	62.6 × 54 mm	498.6 cc	6 Speed	Two-stroke
NSR250	1985–2002	V-twin		250 cc		Two-stroke
NSR500	1984–2002	V-4		499 cc	6 Speed	Two-stroke
NSR500V	1996–2001	V-twin		499 cc	6 Speed	Two-stroke
RC71	1958	Twin		247.33 cc (15 cu in)	4 Speed	2 valves per cylinder
RC110	1962	Single	40 × 39 mm	49.00 cc	6 Speed	4 valves per cylinder
RC111	1962	Single	40 × 39 mm	49.00 cc		4 valves per cylinder
RC112	1962	Twin	33 × 29 mm	49.61 cc (3 cu in)	9 Speed	World's first 50 cc road racer with a twin cylinder DOHC engine; two valves per cylinder
RC113	1963	Twin	33 × 29 mm	49.61 cc (3 cu in)	9 Speed	4 valves per cylinder
RC114	1964	Twin	33 × 29 mm	49.61 cc	9 Speed	
2RC114	1964	Twin		49.6 cc		
RC115	1965	Twin	34 × 27.4 mm	49.8 cc (3 cu in)	9 Speed	
RC116	1966	Twin	35.5 × 25.14 mm	49.8 cc (3 cu in)	9 Speed	
RC125M	1981–1984	Single		124 cc (8 cu in)	6 Speed	
RC141	1959	Twin	44 × 41 mm	124.68 cc (8 cu in)	6 Speed	2 valves per cylinder
RC142	1959	Twin	44 × 41 mm	124.68 cc (8 cu in)	6 Speed	4 valves per cylinder
RC143	1960	Twin	44 × 41 mm	124.68 cc (8 cu in)	6 Speed	
2RC143	1961	Twin	44 × 41 mm	124.68 cc (8 cu in)	6 Speed	
RC144	1961	Twin	42 × 45 mm	124.69cc	6 Speed	2 valves per cylinder
RC145	1962	Twin	44 × 41 mm	124.68 cc (8 cu in)	6 Speed	
RC146	1963	Inline-4	35 × 32 mm	123.15 cc	7 Speed	
2RC146	1964	Inline-4	35 × 32 mm	123.15 cc (8 cu in)	7 Speed	
4RC146	1965	Inline-4	35 × 32 mm	123.15 cc		
RC148	1965	Inline-5	33 × 29 mm	124.02 cc	8 Speed	
RC149	1966	Inline-5	35.5 × 25.14 mm	124.42 cc (8 cu in)	8 Speed	
RC160	1959	Inline-4	44 × 41 mm	249.37 cc (15 cu in)	5 Speed	Honda's first DOHC four
RC161	1960	Inline-4	44 × 41 mm	249.37 cc (15 cu in)	6 Speed	
RC162	1961	Inline-4	44 × 41 mm	249.37 cc (15 cu in)	6 Speed	4 valves per cylinder
RC163	1962	Inline-4	44 × 41 mm	249.37 cc (15 cu in)	6 Speed	
RC164	1963	Inline-4	44 × 41 mm	249.3 cc (15 cu in)	6 Speed	
2RC164	1964	Inline-4		249.3 cc (15 cu in)		
3RC164	1964	Inline-6		247.43 cc		
3RC164	1965	Inline-6	39 × 34.5 mm	247.28 cc		
RC165	1965	Inline-6	39 × 34.5 mm	247.28 cc		
RC166	1966	Inline-6	41 × 31 mm	249.42 cc (15 cu in)	7 Speed	
RC170	1962	Inline-4	47 × 41 mm	284.53 cc (17 cu in)		
RC171	1962	Inline-4	49 × 45 mm	339.43 cc (21 cu in)	6 Speed	
RC172	1964	Inline-4	50 × 44.5 mm	349.50 cc (21 cu in)		
RC173	1966	Inline-4	50 × 44.5 mm	349.50 cc (21 cu in)	6 Speed	
RC174	1967	Inline-6	41 × 37.5 mm	297.06 cc (18 cu in)	7 Speed	
RC181	1967	Inline-4	57.5 × 48 mm	498.6 cc (30 cu in)	6 Speed	
RC250M	1980–1982	Single		248 cc (15 cu in)	5 Speed	
RC250MA	1991	Single		249 cc (15 cu in)	Automatic	
RC335C (RC250M)	1972	Single		248 cc (15 cu in)	5 Speed	
RC500M	1984	Single		491.5 cc (30 cu in)	5 Speed	
RC1000	1981	Inline-4		999.36 cc (61 cu in)	5 Speed	
RCB1000	1976	Inline-4	66 × 66 mm	997.48 cc	5 Speed	
RC211V	2001–2006	V-5		990 cc (60 cu in)		
RC212V	2007–2011	V-4		800 cc (49 cu in)		
RC213V	2012–present	V-4		1,000 cc (61 cu in)	6 Speed	
