= Honda RC164 =

4 cylinder racing motorcycle

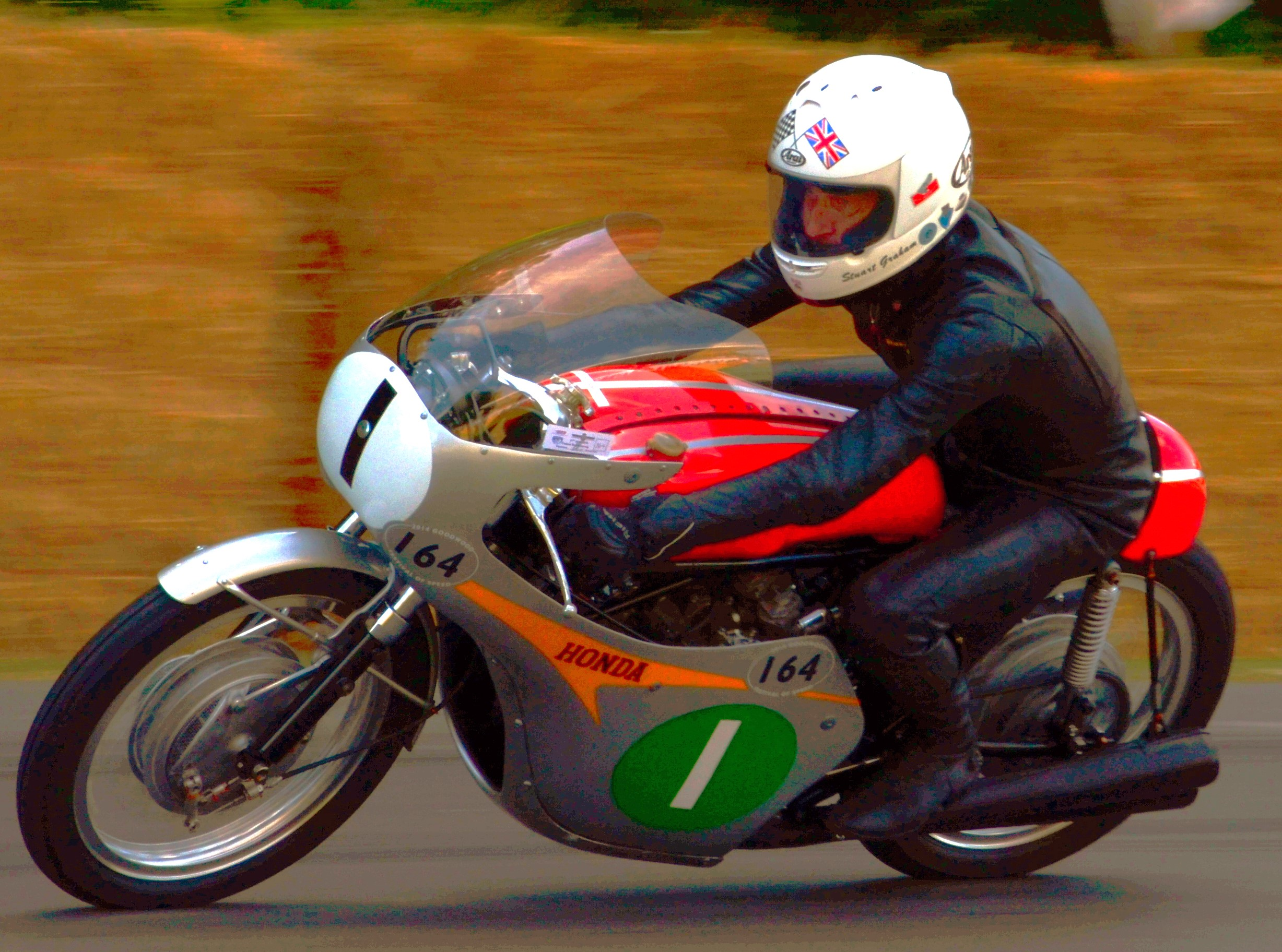
- Honda RC164 at the 2014 Goodwood Festival of Speed
- Manufacturer: Honda
- Production: 1964
- Predecessor: Honda RC163
- Successor: Honda RC165
- Engine: 249 cc (15.2 cu in) air cooled DOHC inline 4
- Bore / stroke: 44 mm × 41 mm (1.7 in × 1.6 in)
- Power: 48 bhp (36 kW) @ 14,000 rpm
- Ignition type: Magneto
- Fuel delivery: 4 Keihin carburettors
- Transmission: Multi-plate dry clutch, 6 speed gearbox, chain drive
- Frame type: Open double loop
- Suspension: F: telescopic forks R: swinging arm
- Brakes: Drum brakes front & rear

The Honda RC164 is a 250 cc (15 cu in) air cooled DOHC inline 4 racing motorcycle that was manufactured by Honda in 1964 to compete in the 250cc World Championship. It was the last of a line of four cylinder 250s that were derived from the 1959 Honda RC160.

== History ==
Honda had first entered GP racing in 1959 and by 1962 were dominating the 250 cc class. Yamaha was improving its RD56 and was quicker than the Honda, The existing inline 4 was at the limit of its development. Honda started working secretly on a new model to restore their dominance in the class. The engineer put in charge of the project was 24 year old Shoichiro Irimajiri, (Note: Irimajiri also designed the twin cylinder 50 cc RC115, five cylinder RC148 and worked on the RA270 Formula 1 engine. Irimajiri later led the design teams for the Gold Wing and CBX.) Design started in January 1964 on a new inline 6. A development of the 4, the RC164, which was lower and lighter than the previous model, was to be used until the six was ready.

Jim Redman, Luigi Taveri and Isamu Kasuya were the works riders for 1964. Tommy Robb (Note: Robb became a works Yamaha rider for 1964 after his departure from Honda.) and Kunimitsu Takahashi were also to have ridden the bike but had their contracts terminated early in the year.

Honda didn't attend the opening race of the season at Daytona. At the next round at the Montjuïc Circuit, Spain Tarquinio Provini on the four cylinder DOHC Benelli was surprisingly faster than both the Honda and the Yamaha of Phil Read.

At the French GP Redman and Read battled for the lead, the lead changing several times until Redman's bike went onto two cylinders and he had to retire.

=== 2RC164 ===
Honda updated the RC164 for the Isle of Man TT. The new bikes, designated 2RC164, produced 50 bhp (37 kW) and were lighter. Every component on the bikes that could be lightened had been. Three bikes were made, one each for Redman, Taveri and Kasuya. Redman won the race despite having an oil leak on the last circuit which sprayed oil of the back wheel causing the bike to slide in left hand corners.

At Assen Read lead until the last corner when Redman dived inside him and the two had a drag race to the finish line. Redman won by less than a wheel's length. The next race was at Spa. Read was leading Redman by inches until the fast Masta Kink where Read's Yamaha seized. Taking avoiding action, Redman left the track at 130 mph (210 km/h). Whilst Redman was trying to get back on track Mike Duff on the other Yamaha took the lead. Duff won the race with Redman second.

In West Germany Redman led until the last lap when Read overtook him and took the win. Mike Hailwood, in his only appearance of the season in the 250 class, led the East German GP on an MZ until he came off. As the following riders took avoiding action Redman took the lead. Read followed closely until the closing laps when he overtook Redman. On the final corner Redman drew level but Read out accelerated him to the line. Read won again in Ulster in wet conditions.

With Read leading championship, Honda sent the new 6 cylinder bike to Monza although it was not fully developed. Only one machine was sent for Redman. In the race Redman led until the bike started to overheat and he had to back off. Redman finished the race third and Taveri on a 2RC164 sixth.

At the season finale at Suzuka Redman had an updated version of the 6 cylinder machine, the Honda RC165, which he took to victory with Kasuya second on the four cylinder bike. Although Redman had 58 championship points to Read's 50, only the best 6 results counted and Read took the championship.

== Racing results ==
Points were awarded to the top six finishers in each race. Only the best six races were counted.

Position	1st	2nd	3rd	4th	5th	6th
Points	8	6	4	3	2	1

Year	Rider	Model	1	2	3	4	5	6	7	8	9	10	11	Points	Rank	Wins
1964	(Federation of Rhodesia and Nyasaland) Jim Redman	RC164	USA -	ESP; 2	FRA; NC									36	**2nd**	2
1964	(Federation of Rhodesia and Nyasaland) Jim Redman	2RC164				IOM; 1	NED; 1	BEL; 2	GER; 2	DDR; 2	ULS; 2			36	**2nd**	2
1964	(Federation of Rhodesia and Nyasaland) Jim Redman	3RC164										NAT; 3		36	**2nd**	2
1964	(Federation of Rhodesia and Nyasaland) Jim Redman	RC165											JPN; 1	36	**2nd**	2
1964	(Switzerland) Luigi Taveri	RC164	USA -	ESP; NC	FRA; 2									11	6th	0
1964	(Switzerland) Luigi Taveri	2RC164				IOM; NC	NED -	BEL -	GER; 6	DDR -	ULS; NC	NAT; 6	JPN; 4	11	6th	0
1964	(Japan) Isamu Kasuya	RC164	USA -	ESP; 4	FRA -									10	7th	0
1964	(Japan) Isamu Kasuya	2RC164				IOM; NC	NED -	BEL; 6	GER; DNQ	DDR -	ULS -	NAT -	JPN; 2	10	7th	0

Colour	Result
Gold	Winner
Silver	Second place
Bronze	Third place
Green	Points classification
Blue	Non-points classification
Blue	Non-classified finish (NC)
Purple	Retired, not classified (Ret)
Red	Did not qualify (DNQ)
Red	Did not pre-qualify (DNPQ)
Black	Disqualified (DSQ)
White	Did not start (DNS)
White	Withdrew (WD)
White	Race cancelled (C)
Blank	Did not practice (DNP)
Blank	Did not arrive (DNA)
Blank	Excluded (EX)

**Bold** – Pole
Italics – Fastest Lap

== Bibliography ==
- Cameron, Kevin (19 December 2017). "Calming The Crankshaft Of Honda's Six-Cylinder Racer". Cycle World.
- Frank, Aaron (4 May 2012). "Honda RC166 250/6". Motorcyclist.
- Kortekaas, Joep. "Honda's Race History - 1964". www.vf750fd.com.
- Martin, Guy (18 October 2018). We Need to Weaken the Mixture. Random House. ISBN 978-0-7535-4548-5.
- Oxley, Mat (17 November 2023). "Honda's 1960s Japanese screamers — the motorcycles that changed grand prix racing". Motor Sport Magazine.
- Pereira, Chris (2014). Motorcycle GP Racing in the 1960s. David and Charles. ISBN 978-1-78711-879-9.
- Richardson, Matthew (30 May 2024). Honda: The Golden Age: Isle of Man TT, 1959–1967. Casemate Publishers. ISBN 978-1-3990-5149-1.
- Walker, Mick (2002). Mick Walker's Japanese Grand Prix Racing Motorcycles. Redline Books. ISBN 978-0-9531311-8-1.
