= Straight-five engine =

Type of engine

The straight-five engine (also referred to as an inline-five engine; abbreviated I5 or L5) is a piston engine with five cylinders mounted in a straight line along the crankshaft.

Although less common than straight-four engines and straight-six engines, straight-five engine designs have been used by automobile manufacturers since the late 1930s. The most notable examples include the Mercedes Benz's diesel engines from 1974 to 2006 and Audi's petrol engines from 1979 to the present. Straight-five engines are smoother running than straight-four engines and shorter than straight-six engines. However, achieving consistent fueling across all cylinders was problematic prior to the adoption of fuel injection.

== Characteristics ==
Animation of the 1-2-4-5-3 firing order

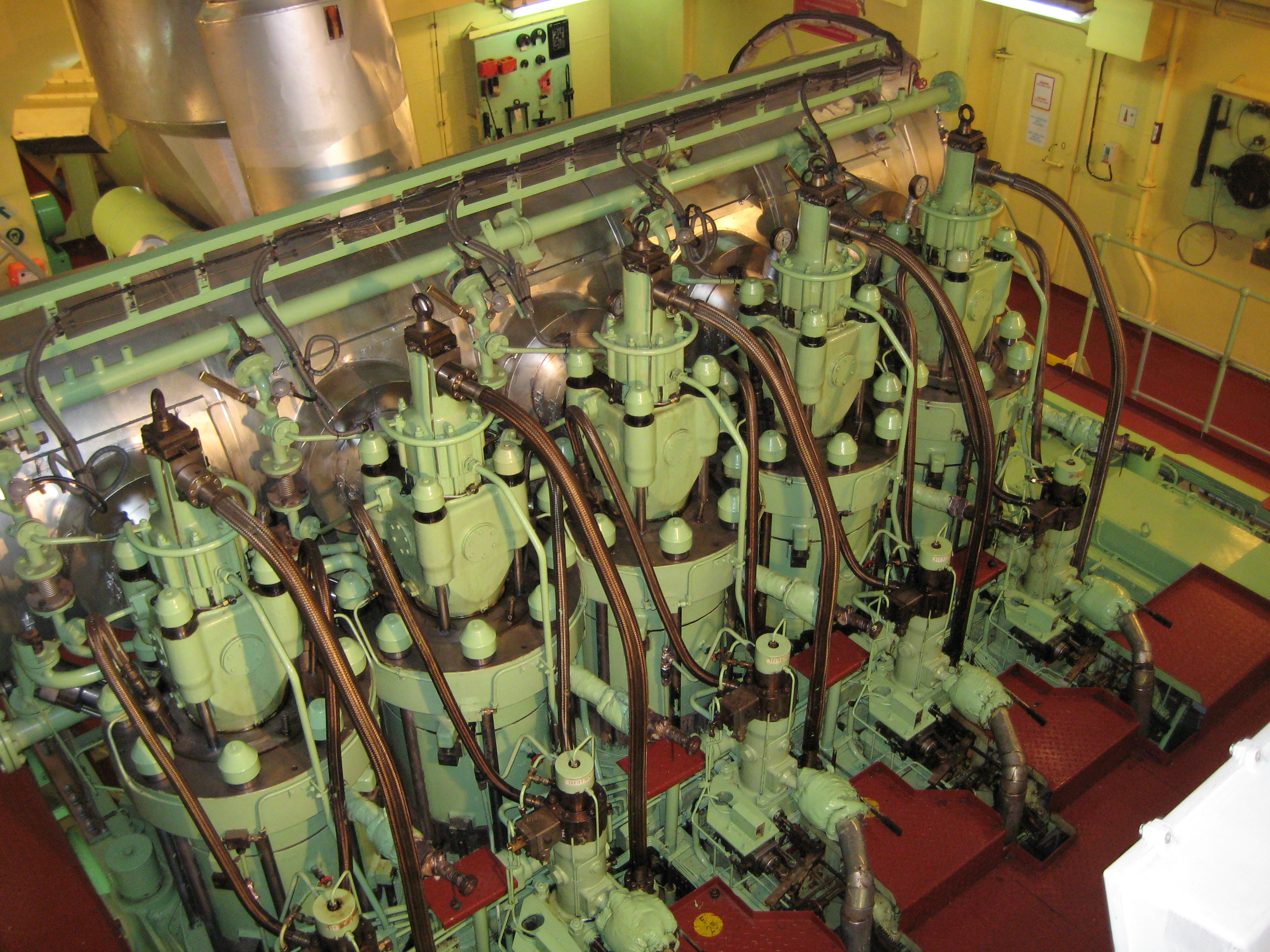
MAN B&W 5S50MC 1,865 litre marine diesel engine

Straight-five engines are typically shorter than straight-six engines, making them easier to fit transversely in an engine bay. They are also smoother than straight-four engines, and are narrower than V engines and flat engines.

=== Engine balance and vibration ===
Five-cylinder engines have a crankshaft with 72 degree angles. Amongst four-stroke engines, an advantage of engines with five or more cylinders is that the power strokes are overlapping if the engine has an even firing order.

A disadvantage of the odd number of cylinders in a straight-five engine is it results in imperfect primary and secondary engine balance, unlike a straight-six engine which has perfect primary and secondary balance. Counterweights on the crankshaft can be used to counteract some amount of these vibrations. This method is also used in straight-four engines.

=== Firing order ===
Most four-stroke straight-five engines use a firing order of 1-2-4-5-3. This firing order results in the minimal primary (crank speed) rocking couple, and is used by the Volvo Modular engine, VW/Audi straight-five engine, General Motors Atlas engine and Honda G engine. Straight-five engines typically have a 72 degree crankshaft design.

All two stroke straight-five engines are limited in having a single firing order for a given crank configuration; because a complete cycle occurs every 360 degrees, there is no chance to share piston phases without having simultaneous ignitions, so the straight-five is at no disadvantage in this case. Some two-stroke outboard engines, e.g. the Mercury Marine Force 150 engine use a firing order of 1-5-2-3-4.

=== Carburettors and fuel injection ===
The use of straight-five petrol engines in mass production cars only became truly viable with the advent of reliable fuel injection. This is because of the unavoidable problems of a carburettor supplying an odd number of cylinders and the length of the inlet manifold between the carburetor varying greatly between cylinders at the ends of the engine and those nearer the carburetor. Unlike other engine layouts, these problems are not easily solved by using multiple carburettors.

Diesel engines have always used fuel injection, therefore large displacement straight-five diesel engines were commonly seen decades before straight-five petrol engines.

== Usage in automobiles ==
=== Diesel engines ===
The 1938 Lancia 3Ro trucks introduced a straight-five diesel engine to replace the previous straight-three engine. Built for the Italian and German armed forces during World War II and later for civilian usage, the truck remained in production until 1950.

The first mass-production straight-five passenger car engine was the 1974 Mercedes-Benz OM617, a naturally-aspirated 3.0 L (183 cu in) engine introduced in the Mercedes-Benz 300D (W114/W115) models. In 1978, a turbocharged version was introduced in the Mercedes-Benz 300SD Turbo models. Mercedes-Benz continued to produce straight-five engines for the next 28 years, until the Mercedes-Benz OM647 engine ended production in 2006.

In 1978, the Audi 2.0 R5 D engine was introduced in the Audi 100 sedan. In 1983, a turbocharged version was introduced, initially for the U.S. market Audi 100. Several Volvo cars were produced with Audi straight-five diesel engines, prior to the introduction of the Volvo D5 turbo-diesel engine; this engine was produced from 2001 to 2017 and was used in several diesel hybrid applications (marketed as "twin engine" models).

Other mass-production straight-five diesel engines include the 1999–2001 VM Motori 531 turbo-diesel engine, the 1998–2007 Land Rover Td5 turbo-diesel engine, the 2006–2019 Ford Duratorq 3.2 turbo-diesel engine, the 1998–2009 Fiat JTD 2.4 turbo-diesel engine and the 1990–2001 Toyota PZ engine.

=== Petrol engines ===
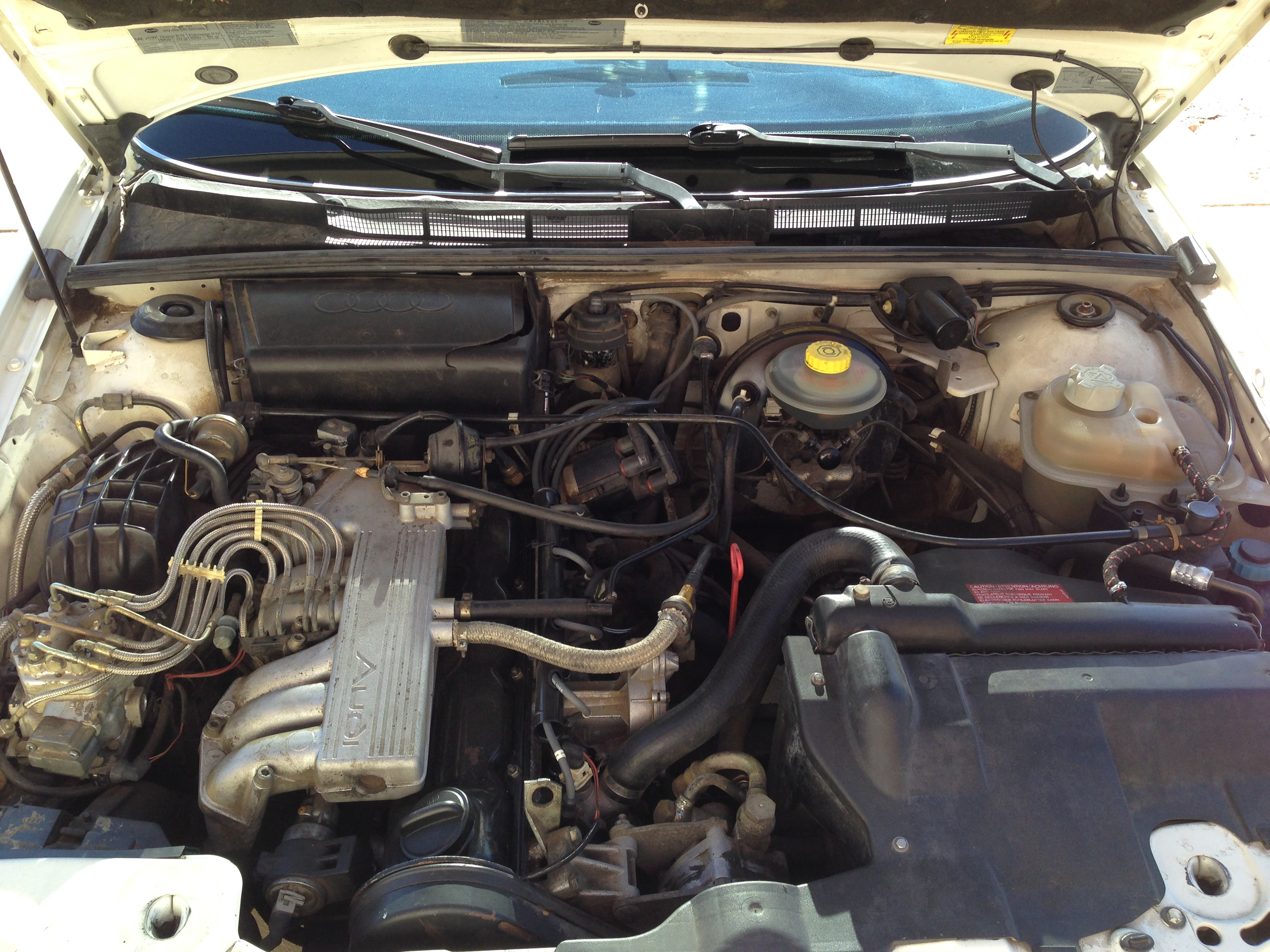
An Audi 2.3 NG engine, mounted longitudinally

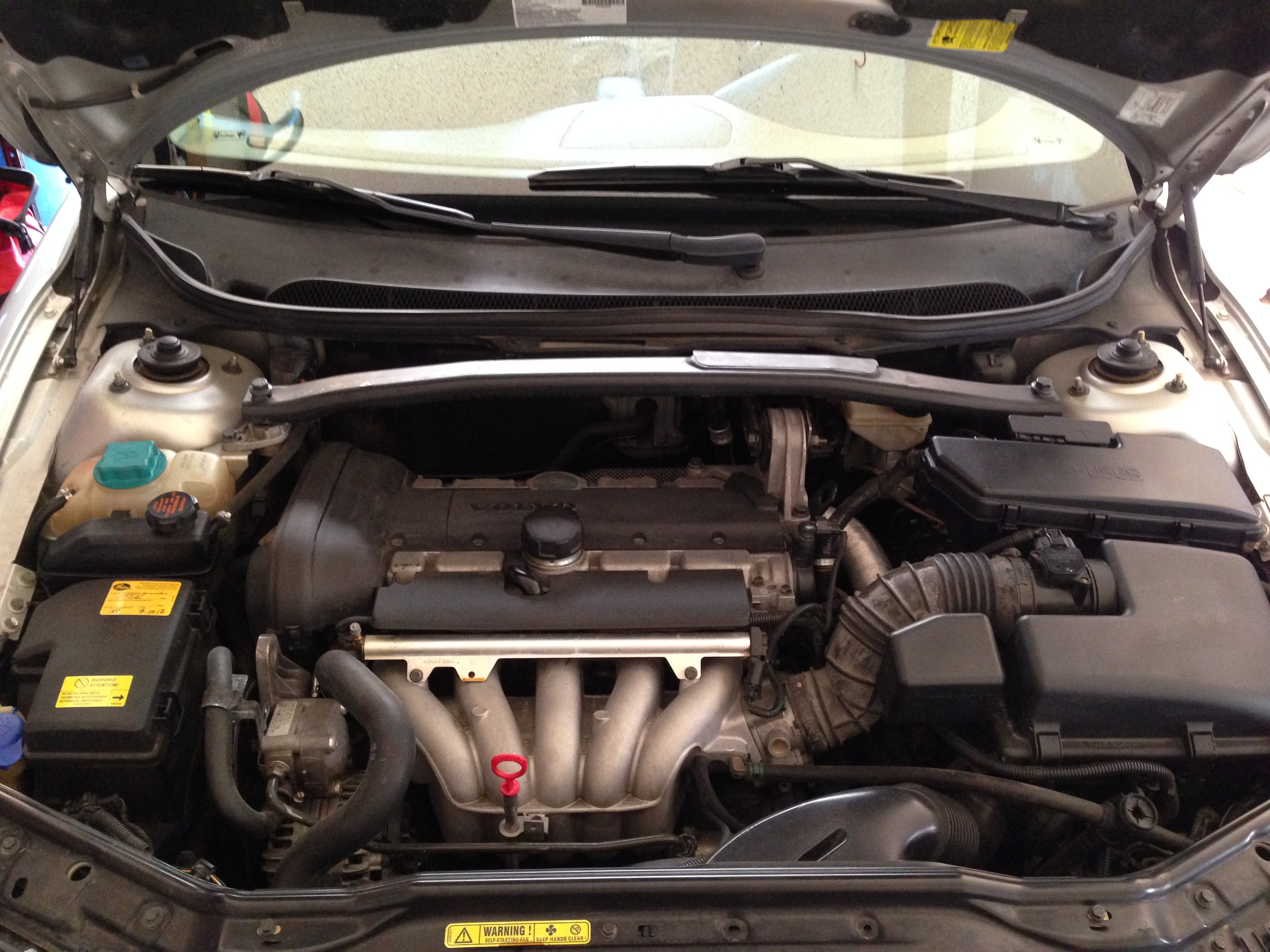
A Volvo B5244S engine, mounted transversely

Henry Ford had an inline-five engine developed in the late 1930s to early 1940s for a compact economy car design, which never saw production due to lack of demand for small cars in the United States.

The first production straight-five petrol engine was the Audi 2.1 R5 introduced in the Audi 100 in 1977. Audi had tested several six-cylinder engine layouts but could not achieve a satisfactory balance between packaging and handling; Ferdinand Piëch (who had recently become Audi's Chief Designer) then concluded that five cylinders was the only option. Audi has continued use of straight-five petrol engines (in both naturally aspirated and turbocharged versions) to the present day. The Audi RS3 currently uses straight-five engines. In motorsport, the first car to use a straight-five engine was the Audi Quattro rally car; other racing cars which used straight-five engines include the 1985-1986 Audi Sport Quattro E2 and the 1989 Audi 90 Quattro IMSA GTO. For the year 1987 factory team tested a 1,000 PS (735 kW) version of the inline-5 powered Audi S1 Sport Quattro.

Several Volkswagen-branded straight-five engines have been produced, beginning with the Volkswagen WH/WN 1.9 litre 10v engine used in the 1981 Volkswagen Passat. The final Volkswagen straight-five petrol engine was the Volkswagen EA855 2.5 litre 20v engine used in the North American Passat models until 2014.

The Volvo Modular engine was introduced in the 1991 Volvo 850 sedan and was used in various Volvo models, along with the Ford Focus ST and Ford Focus RS models. All of the straight-five petrol engines used by Volvo and Ford were built at the Volvo Skövde engine plant in Skövde, Sweden, until their discontinuation in 2016.

Other straight-five petrol engines include

- 1989-1998 Honda G-series 2.0-2.5 litre 20v engines
- 1995-2006 Fiat Family C 2.0-2.4 litre 20v engine
- 2004-2012 General Motors Vortec 3500/3700 3.5-3.7 litre 20v engines

In recent years the engine has been falling out of favour, with Volvo announcing in 2012 it would discontinue building them, for example.

== Usage in commercials ==
The mass-production straight-five diesel engine comes from Scania AB used in their trucks and buses:

- DC9 engine (8.9 liter / 8,867 cc)
- DC09 / OC9 / OC09 engine (9.3 liter / 9,291 cc)

It is straight-five, four-stroke, and has firing order of 1-2-4-5-3, also available with both Ethanol ( DC9 E02 ) and Liquified/Compressed Natural Gas ( OC9 / OC09 )

== Usage in motorcycles ==
Very few motorcycles have used five-cylinder engines. However, the 1965 Honda RC148 and 1966 Honda RC149 125 cc four-stroke racing motorcycles used straight-five engines based on the 50 cc straight-twin engine from the Honda RC116 Grand Prix racing motorcycle. These straight-five engines were an unusual design in that they were configured as a straight-six engine with one of the middle cylinders removed.

== See also ==
- V5 engine
- VR5 engine
