= Yamaha RD48 =

- Manufacturer: Yamaha Motor Company
- Production: 1961–1962
- Predecessor: Yamaha YD-A, YD-B
- Successor: Yamaha RD56
- Class: Race Bike
- Engine: 246cc two-stroke

The Yamaha RD48 was a two stroke 250cc Grand Prix racing motorcycle. It had two 56x50mm cylinders, disk valves, and an Oldham coupler joining the crank shafts. Weight was 100 kg and power 35PS (34.5 bhp).

It was ridden by Tanahara Noguchi and Fumio Ito in Yamaha's first GP on Sunday, 21 May 1961, the French GP.

Along with the 125cc RA41, the RD48 contended at Yamaha's first official entry of the 1961 Isle of Man TT, with team riders Fumio Ito (11th RA41, 6th place, RD48), Yoshikazu Sunako, Osamu Masuko, Taneharu Noguchi (17th place RA41), Hideo Oishi (12th place RA41), New Zealander Peter Pawson and Brit Tony Godfrey. Masuko (Winner of the 1957 250cc Mount Asama Race) crashed in practice and was replaced by Guatemalan Luis Giron.

Ito achieved 8th place and at the end of the 1961 season was 9th in the championship.

The engine was improved for the 1962 season generating a claimed 42 bhp at 10,000 rpm, however only the Singapore GP was entered.

== Bibliography ==
MacKellar, Colin (28 August 1995). Yamaha: All Factory and Production Road-Racing Two-Strokes from 1955 to 1993. UK: The Crowood Press Ltd. p. 191. ISBN 1-85223-920-4.

Ainscoe, Raymond (2011). Yamaha at the TT Races 1961 to 1968. UK: Ilkley Racing Books. p. 40. ISBN 978-0-9524802-7-3.
