= Honda RC166 =

6 cylinder racing motorcycle

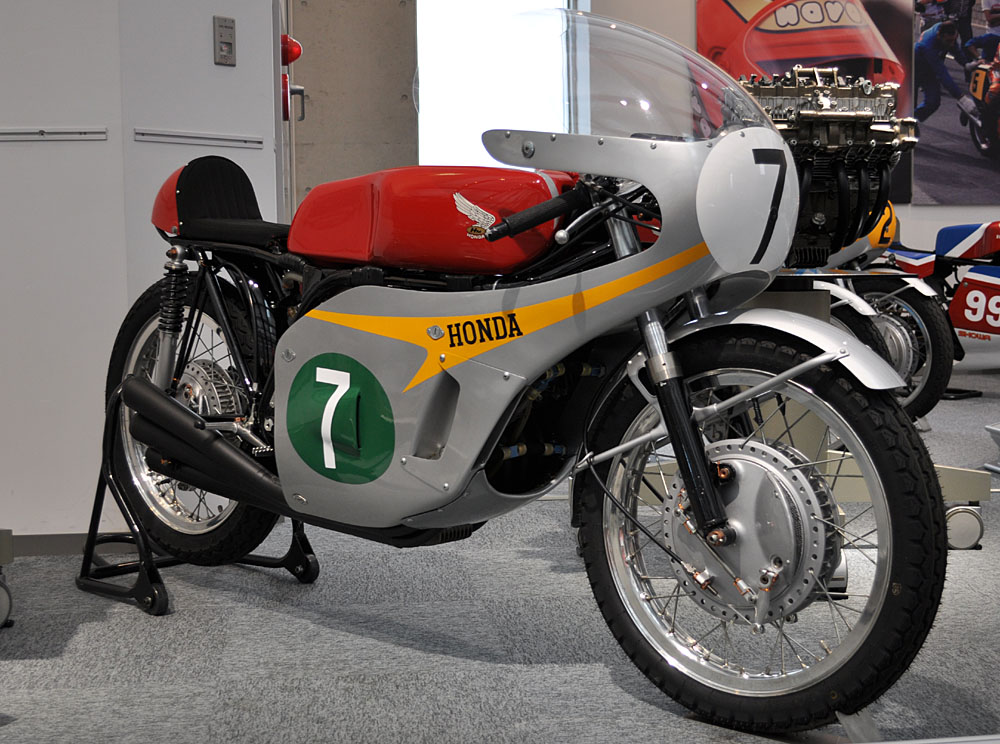
- 1967 RC166 that was ridden by Mike Hailwood on display at the Honda Museum at Motegi.
- Manufacturer: Honda Racing Service Club
- Parent company: Honda
- Production: 1966–1967
- Assembly: Asaka, Saitama, Japan
- Predecessor: Honda RC164
- Engine: 245.6 cc (14.99 cu in) Air cooled inline 6 4 stroke
- Bore / stroke: 41 mm × 31 mm (1.6 in × 1.2 in)
- Compression ratio: 11.0:1
- Power: 60 bhp (45 kW) @ 18,000 rpm
- Transmission: 7 speed gearbox, chain drive
- Frame type: Duplex cradle
- Suspension: Front: telescopic forks Rear: swinging arm
- Brakes: Drum brakes front and rear
- Wheelbase: 1,410 mm (55.5 in)
- Weight: 112 kg (247 lb) (dry)

The Honda RC166, also known as the Honda 6, is a Grand Prix racing motorcycle produced by Honda which raced in 1966 and 1967. The technological advanced bike was a 250 cc (15 cu in) DOHC air-cooled inline 6. On the bike Mike Hailwood took the 250cc riders championship and Honda the constructors championship in both years it raced. It was evolved from the earlier 3RC164 and RC165.

== Background ==
Honda had first enterered GP racing in 1959 and by 1962 were dominating the 250 cc class. In 1964 the Hondas were no match for the Yamaha RD56. The existing inline 4 RC164 was at the limit of its development. Honda started working on a new model to restore their dominance in the class. The engineer put in charge of the project was 24 year old Shoichiro Irimajiri. (Note: Irimajiri also designed the twin cylinder 50 cc RC115, five cylinder RC148 and worked on the RA270 Formula 1 engine. Irimajiri later led the design teams for the Gold Wing and CBX.) Design started in January 1964 and the initial sketches were completed in February 1964. A running engine was produced in June.

== Predecessors ==
=== 3RC164 ===
2 stroke engines, as used by competitors Suzuki and Yamaha, have a power stroke every crankshaft rotation, whereas 4 strokes as used by Honda only produce a power stroke every 2 rotations of the crankshaft. Soichiro Honda had already made a public commitment to make quieter, cleaner running, more efficient 4 strokes. The solution was to make the four stroke rev higher to produce more power strokes. To achieve this while maintaining reliability, Irimajiri reduced reciprocating weight by using 6 cylinders and 4 valve heads. The engine was an engineering masterpiece, no wider than the four it replaced and narrower than the Yamaha twin.

Although being developed for the 1965 season, the bike was ready for the September 1964 Nations Grand Prix at Monza. It was designated 3RC164, to suggest to competitors that it was an evolution of the existing four cylinder machine. The bike was shipped with only four exhausts to further fool the competition. The bike was sent to Monza in secrecy. Some sources give it accompanying engineer Michihiko Aika and rider Jim Redman on a BOAC VC10 from Tokyo to Monza. The 3RC164 proved to be faster than the Yamahas but suffered a vapour lock in the carburettors. Phil Read won the race on a RD56 clinching the championship, Yamaha's first World Championship. At the following GP, the Japanese GP at Honda's circuit Suzuka, Redman won on the 6.

=== RC165 ===
Early in the 1965 season an updated version, the RC165, was introduced. Honda did not attend the 1965 season opener at Daytona and in the 2nd round at the Nürburgring Redman fell and injured himself in the 350cc race. This prevented him starting the 250 race and also caused him to miss the 3rd round in Spain. Fit again for France, he suffered gearbox problems whilst in the lead. In Ulster Redman fell in the 350 race and broke his collarbone. This putting him out the 250 race and the following round. Feeling fit enough to race at Monza he was told his bike had not been sent to the circuit so he stayed at home in Rhodesia. (Note: This was due to miscommunication within Honda and the bike actually had been sent to Monza) Although only competing in 6 rounds of the championship Redman achieved 3 wins, a second and a third, finishing 3rd in the championship. Honda finished 2nd in the constructors championship.

Late in 1965 Mike Hailwood signed a contract to return to Honda for £40,000. Honda convinced the organisers of the season finale, the Japanese Grand Prix, to move the 250 race to the end of the programme so Hailwood could fulfil his MV Agusta contract racing their 350 and then ride the Honda in the 250 race. After winning the race on the RC165 his opinion of it was bloody awful. Hailwood allegedly asked the mechanics to remove the rear suspension units and then threw them in a pond telling the mechanics to fit Girling units. He also asked for a new frame made of stiffer tubing and with the wheelbase lengthened 3.5 in (89 mm), and suggested Dutchman Nico Bakker built the new frame but Honda baulked at an outsider being involved. Redman had also been urging Honda all season to develop the bike further.

== RC166 ==
For 1966 an updated version, the RC166 was introduced. With the stiffer and longer frame Hailwood had requested the handling of the bike improved significantly. Hailwood and the RC166 were dominant in 1966, winning all 10 of the races he entered, although only the best 7 results counted towards the championship. As well as Hailwood's rider's championship Honda won the constructors title.

Redman crashed in the 500 race at Spa in torrential rain breaking his wrist. When his wrist was too painful to race at Ulster five weeks later he decided to retire. Stuart Graham, son of Leslie Graham, is brought in to replace Redman.

Ralph Bryans partnered Hailwood on the RC166s for 1967. Yamaha had developed a water cooled 250 V4 in response to Honda's 6. For 1967 it was re-engineered to reduce size and weight. Hailwood and Yamaha's Read tied for points at the end of the season. Hailwood won the championship as he had five wins as opposed to Read's four. Honda won the constructors title for the second year running.

At the end of 1967 the FIM introduced new regulations for the 1968 season that levelled the playing field and favoured the European manufacturers, leading to Honda withdrawing from GP racing. Paddock rumours were that the 6 would have been replaced with a new water cooled V8 in 1968 if Honda hadn't have withdrawn from GP racing. Honda presented Hailwood with a RC166 in recognition of his two world titles on the model. (Note: The bike was displayed in the Birmingham motorcycle showroom that Hailwood owned with Rod Gould. After Hailwood's death Gould sold the bike to a Dutch collector. Hailwood’s widow, Pauline, put the matter in the hands of the police when she realised the bike was missing. Although Gould was convicted of theft the bike was never returned.) They also lent Ralph Bryans, who had won the 50cc title for Honda in 1965, three bikes for 1968 including a RC166 to compete in non-championship events. Bryans had to maintain the bikes himself.

== 350cc RC174 ==
In 1966 Hailwood had complained about the handling of the 350cc four cylinder RC173. For 1967 Honda produced a larger capacity version of the RC166 to race in the 350 category. The stroke had been increased to 37.5 mm (1.48 in) giving a capacity of 297 cc (18.1 cu in). Hailwood won the first 5 races of the season which was enough to secure the championship. Bryans rode the bike for the rest of the season and finished 3rd in the championship.

== Technical details ==
=== Engine ===
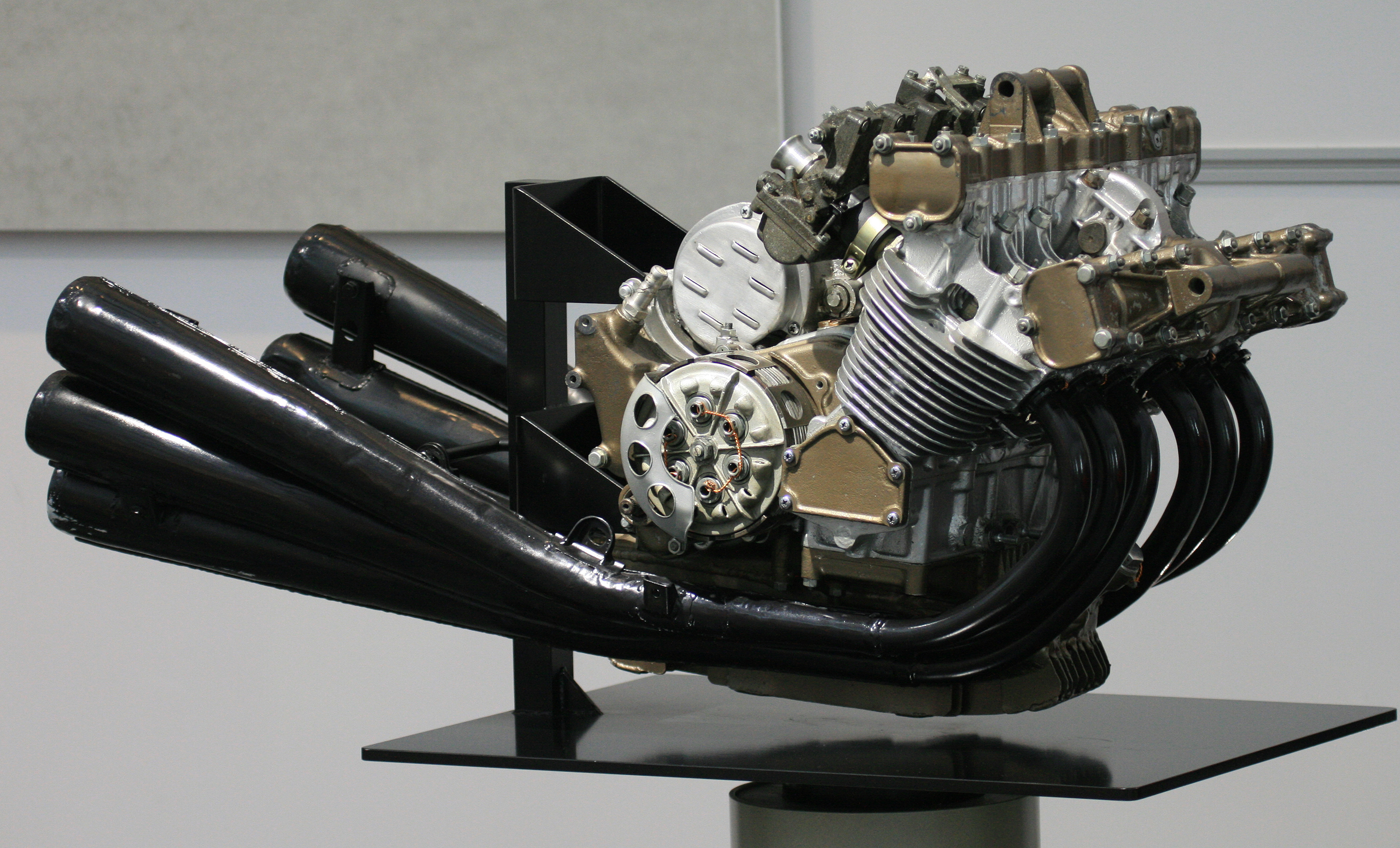
Honda RC165 engine

The compact 6 was no wider than the 4 it replaced. The block was cast as part of the upper crankcase and the heads were cast in two pieces, one for each 3 cylinders. The engine extensively used titanium and magnesium castings and revved to over 18,000 rpm.

The crankshaft was pressed up on precision jigs from 13 separate components. To reduce the effective vibrating length of the crankshaft, drive to the clutch was transmitted through a jack shaft driven by a gear between cylinders 3 and 4. Because the torsional forces on the built-up crank were greater near the centre of the engine, different sized crankpins were used, largest for cylinders 3 and 4, smaller for 2 and 5 and the smallest on 1 and 6. Conrods were one-piece with roller bearings.

Drive for the camshafts was by a train of spur gears between cylinders 2 and 3. The camshafts were barrel shaped with the greater mass at the centre to minimise flexing. 4 valve heads were fitted with each one of the four valves a different shape.

The RC166 had a bore and stroke of 41 mm × 31 mm (1.6 in × 1.2 in) giving 245.6 cc (14.99 cu in). (39 mm × 34.5 mm (1.54 in × 1.36 in) (247.3cc) on the 3RC164 and 39 mm × 34.8 mm (1.54 in × 1.37 in) (249.4cc) on the RC165)

Transmission was via a multi-plate dry clutch, 7 speed gearbox (8 on the RC165) and chain drive. It produced 60 bhp (45 kW) at 18,000 rpm. (54 bhp (40 kW) at 17,000 rpm for the 3RC164, 56 bhp (42 kW) at 16,500 rpm for the RC165)

Two oil coolers were fitted on the RC165, one in each side of the fairing.

=== Cycle parts ===
The bike used a duplex cradle. It was stiffer and had a longer wheelbase than the original frame of the 3RC164 and RC165. Front forks were telescopic and the swinging arm was controlled by 2 Girling shock absorbers (Honda shocks on the 3RC164 and RC165). The brakes were drums, a 230 mm (9 in) 4ls on the front and 200 mm (8 in) 2ls on the rear, both brakes were fitted with cooling rings. Wheels were 18 inch shod with Dunlop K124 tyres.

== Racing results ==
Points were awarded to the top six finishers in each race. Only the best six races were counted in 1964 and 1966, 7 in 1965 and 1967

Position	1st	2nd	3rd	4th	5th	6th
Points	8	6	4	3	2	1

Year	Rider	1	2	3	4	5	6	7	8	9	10	11	12	13	Points	Rank	Wins
1964	(Federation of Rhodesia and Nyasaland) Jim Redman	USA	ESP	FRA	IOM	NED	BEL	GER	DDR	ULS	FIN	NAT; 3	JPN; 1		42	**2nd**	3
1965	(Federation of Rhodesia and Nyasaland) Jim Redman	USA	GER	ESP	FRA; NC	IOM; 1	NED; 2	BEL; 1	DDR; 1	CZE; 3	ULS	FIN	NAT	JPN	34	**3rd**	3
1965	(Northern Ireland) Ralph Bryans	USA	GER	ESP	FRA	IOM	NED	BEL	DDR	CZE	ULS; 5	FIN; 3	NAT	JPN	6	13th	0
1965	(United Kingdom) Mike Hailwood	USA	GER	ESP	FRA	IOM	NED		DDR	TCH	ULS	FIN	NAT	JPN; 1	8	10th	1
1966	(Federation of Rhodesia and Nyasaland) Jim Redman	ESP; NC	GER; 2	FRA; 2	NED; 3	BEL; 3	DDR	CZE	FIN	ULS	IOM	NAT	JPN		20	**3rd**	0
1966	(United Kingdom) Mike Hailwood	ESP; 1	GER; 1	FRA; 1	NED; 1	BEL; 1	DDR; 1	TCH; 1	FIN; 1	ULS	IOM; 1	NAT; 1	JPN		56	**1st**	10
1966	(United Kingdom) Stuart Graham	ESP	GER	FRA	NED	BEL	DDR; 4	TCH; Ret	FIN; 2	ULS; Ret	IOM; 2	NAT; Ret	JPN		15	6th	0
1967	(United Kingdom) Mike Hailwood	ESP; Ret	GER	FRA; 3	IOM; 1	NED; 1	BEL; 2	DDR; Ret	TCH; 3	FIN; 1	ULS; 1	NAT; Ret	CAN; 1	JPN; Ret	50	**1st**	5
1967	(Northern Ireland) Ralph Bryans	ESP; 2	GER; 1	FRA; 4	IOM; 3	NED; 3	BEL; 3	DDR; 3	CZE; 4	FIN; NC	ULS; 2	NAT; 3	CAN; 3	JPN; 1	40	4th	2

Colour	Result
Gold	Winner
Silver	Second place
Bronze	Third place
Green	Points classification
Blue	Non-points classification
Blue	Non-classified finish (NC)
Purple	Retired, not classified (Ret)
Red	Did not qualify (DNQ)
Red	Did not pre-qualify (DNPQ)
Black	Disqualified (DSQ)
White	Did not start (DNS)
White	Withdrew (WD)
White	Race cancelled (C)
Blank	Did not practice (DNP)
Blank	Did not arrive (DNA)
Blank	Excluded (EX)

**Bold** – Pole
Italics – Fastest Lap
