= Honda RC163 =

4 cylinder racing motorcycle

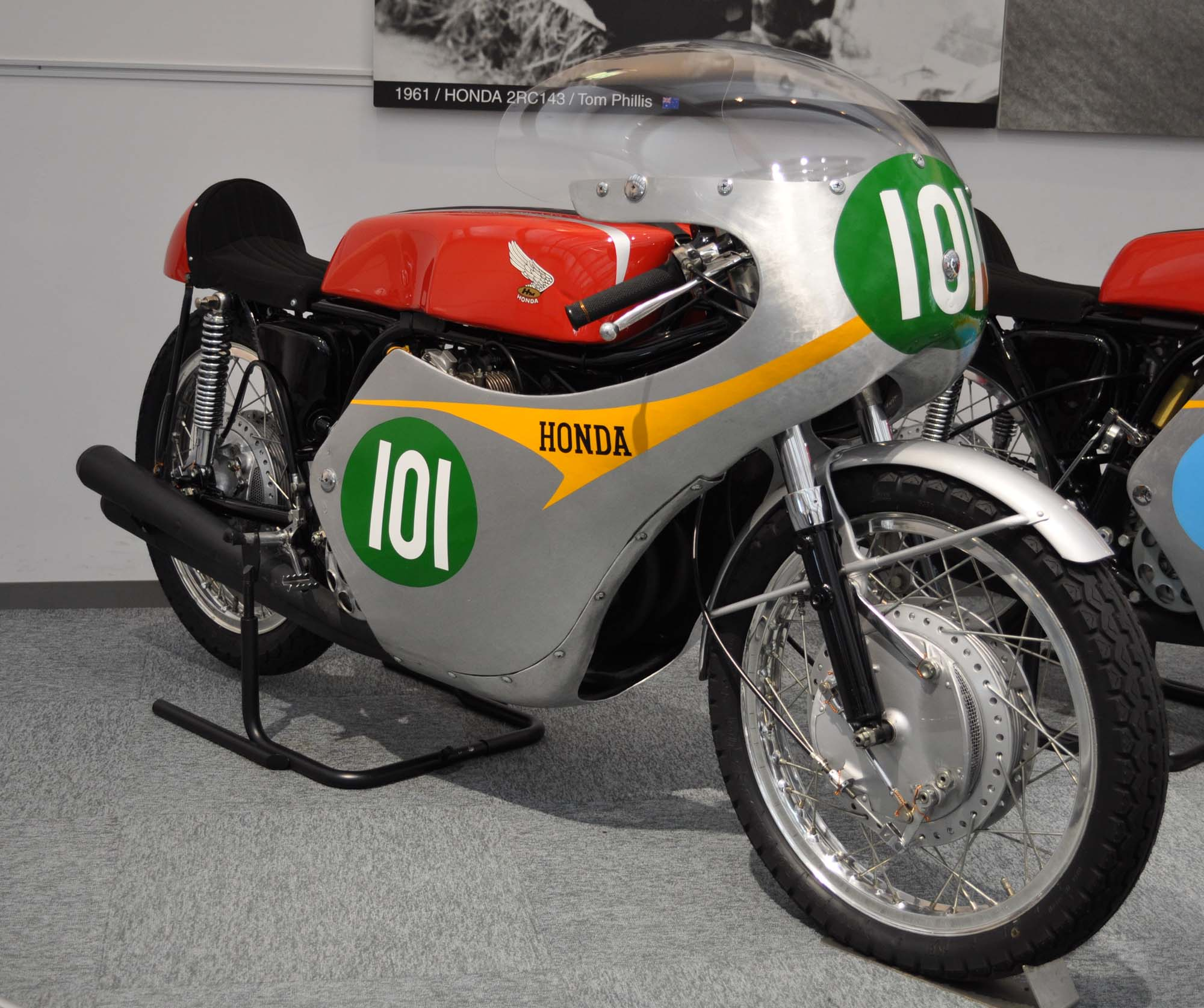
- Honda RC163
- Manufacturer: Honda
- Production: 1962
- Predecessor: Honda RC162
- Successor: Honda RC164
- Engine: 249 cc (15.2 cu in) air cooled DOHC inline 4
- Bore / stroke: 44 mm × 41 mm (1.7 in × 1.6 in)
- Power: 46 bhp (34 kW) @ 14,000 rpm
- Ignition type: Magneto
- Fuel delivery: 4 Keihin carburettors
- Transmission: Multi-plate dry clutch, 6 speed gearbox, chain drive
- Frame type: Open double loop
- Suspension: F: telescopic forks R: swinging arm
- Brakes: Drum brakes front & rear
- Tyres: F: 2.75 x 18; R: 3.00 x 18
- Weight: 130 kg (290 lb) (dry)

The Honda RC163 is a 250 cc (15 cu in) air cooled DOHC inline 4 racing motorcycle that was manufactured by Honda in 1962 to compete in the 250cc World Championship. The machine won 8 of the 9 GPs it participated in. Rider Jim Redman won the World Championship on a RC163 and Honda won the Manufacturers Championship. Honda cut back their racing budget for 1963 and no new bike was developed so the RC163 was used for a second season. Redman retained the Championship by a small margin and Honda retained the Manufacturers Championship.

== History ==
=== 1962 ===
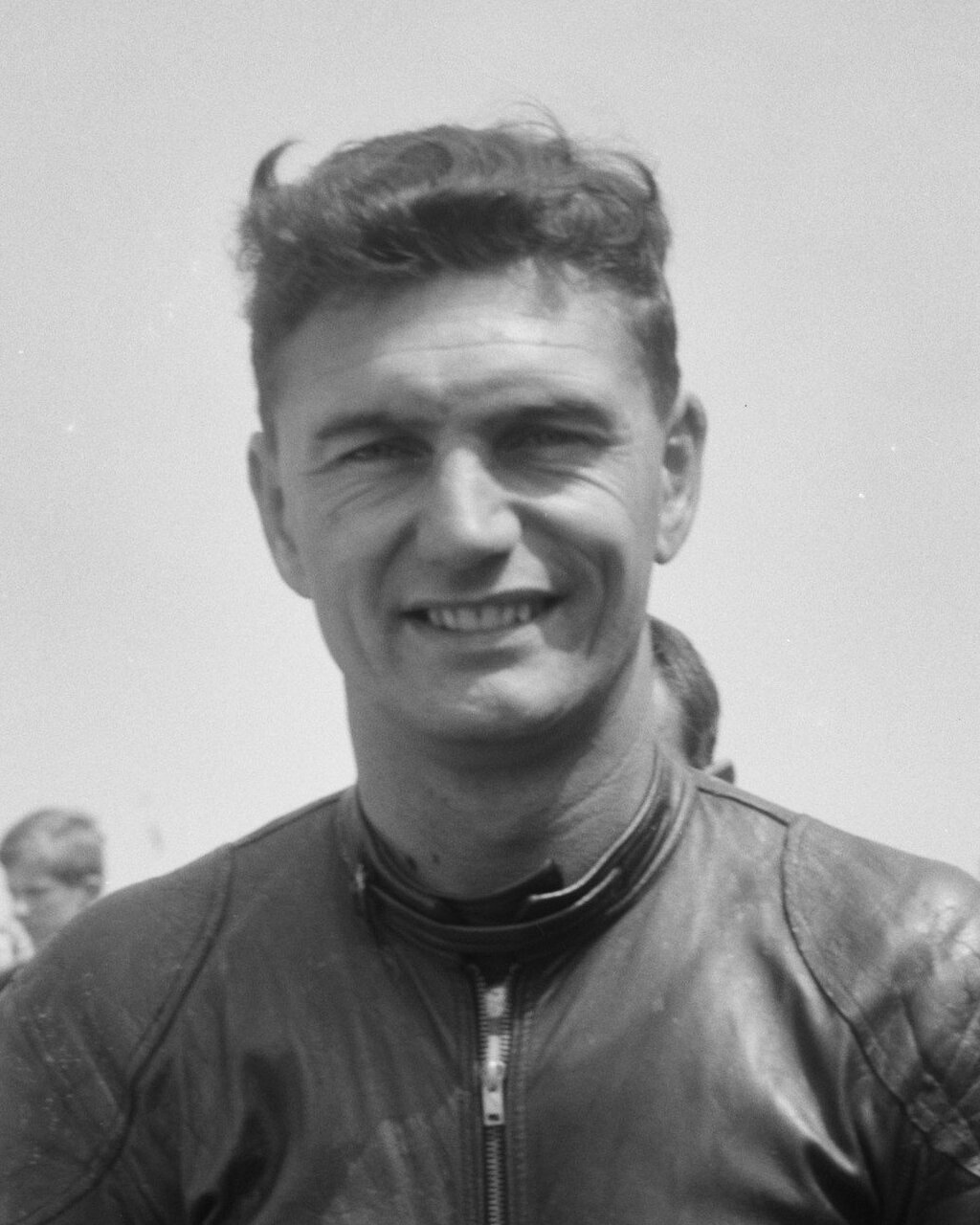
Jim Redman, 1962 & 1963 250cc World Champion on a Honda RC163

The previous year's RC162 had been dominant in the 250cc World Championship, winning 10 of the 11 and securing the World Championship for Mike Hailwood. The RC163 was an evolution of the previous year's RC162. The engine had larger cooling fins (Note: The RC162 had suffered overheating problems at some circuits.) and power output increased to 46 bhp (34 kW) @ 14,000 rpm with maximum engine speed increased to 15,000 rpm. The frame had been strengthened and a new 210 mm (8.3 in) double sided twin leading shoe front brake fitted.

Hailwood had left Honda and signed for MV for 1962. Works riders for this year were Jim Redman, Tom Phillis, Bob McIntyre, Teisuke Tanaka and Kunimitsu Takahashi.

The season started well with Redman, McIntyre and Phillis taking the first three places in the opening two GPs at Montjuïc and Charade.

The UK concessionaire Honda UK lent Derek Minter an RC162 for the Isle of Man TT. Minter was reminded before the race that Redman was leading the championship on the works RC163, with the implication that he should not beat Redman in the race. Ignoring this Minter won the race which displeased Honda and affected the chance of a future factory ride. McIntyre had led at the start of the race and set a new lap record but had later suffered an engine failure. In the Junior TT (350cc) Phillis had a fatal crash while riding a 285cc Honda RC170.

Irishman Tommy Robb, who had been racing in 50cc and 125cc for Honda, was brought into the 250 team as a replacement for Phillis. In his first race on the RC163 in the Dutch TT he fell. Redman won the race with McIntyre second.

At the West German GP McIntyre agreed to help Redman win the championship. Redman won with McIntyre second.

In August, while riding a Manx Norton in the 500cc British Championship at Oulton Park, McIntyre crashed and died in hospital a few days later.

Redman and Robb were pushing each other hard at the Ulster Grand Prix, the lead going backward and forward between the two. On the penultimate lap Redman's bike went onto two cylinders and Robb won his home race.

At the East German GP at Sachsenring Hailwood was given a one-off ride on the new tein-cylinder MZ. MZ works rider Alan Shepherd led the race ahead of Hailwood and Redman who were fighting for second place. Shepherd dropped out when his engine stopped. On the last corner Hailwood and Redman touched fairings and Redman recovered slightly quicker to beat Hailwood over the line by less than a wheel's length.

Honda did not compete in the final GP of the season, the Argentine GP.

With six wins Redman won the Championship (Note: Redman also won the 350cc Championship in 1962.) and Honda the Manufacturers Championship. (Note: Honda also won the 125cc and 350cc Manufacturers Championship in 1962.)

=== 1963 ===
Honda cut back on its racing budget for 1963, a lot of resources being used to develop their Honda RA271 Formula 1 car. No new 250 was developed and the team had to use the previous year's RC163. The race team was cut back to Redman, Taveri, Takahashi and Robb.

At the start of the season there was an unexpected challenge to the Honda domination in the 250 class from Tarquinio Provini on the single cylinder Morini. Provini won the first two rounds, the Spanish and West German GPs, with Redman finishing second in Spain and third in Germany.

The French GP was cancelled due to dense fog at the circuit. Redman won the next 2 races, the IOM and Dutch TT, but fell in the 125 race at Assen, breaking his collarbone. This kept him out of the next race in Belgium which was won by Fumio Ito on the new Yamaha RD56.

In East Germany Hailwood and Shepherd on MZs dominated the race and finished first and second. Redman was a long way back in third and commented after the race that the MZs were much faster than his Honda.

The championship went down to the wire at the season finale at the inaugural Japanese GP, held at the Honda built Suzuka Circuit, Redman won in front of Honda's 150,000 home crowd. Redman retained his Championship (Note: Redman also retained his 350cc Championship in 1963.) and Honda the Manufacturers Championship. (Note: Honda also retained the 350 Manufacturers Championship in 1963.)

=== Replicas ===
A number of replicas have been made. Phil Morris made a series of 21 replicas using the four cylinder MC14E engine from the Honda CBR250F.

== Racing results ==
Points were awarded to the top six finishers in each race. Only the best six races were counted.

Position	1st	2nd	3rd	4th	5th	6th
Points	8	6	4	3	2	1

Year	Rider	1	2	3	4	5	6	7	8	9	10	11	Points	Rank	Wins
1962	(Federation of Rhodesia and Nyasaland) Jim Redman	ESP; 1	FRA; 1	IOM; 2	NED; 1	BEL; 2	GER; 1	ULS; 2	DDR; 1	NAT; 1	ARG -		48	**1st**	6
1962	(United Kingdom) Bob McIntyre	ESP; 2	FRA; 2	IOM; DNS	NED; 2	BEL; 1	GER; 2	ULS -	DDR -	NAT -	ARG -		32	**2nd**	1
1962	(Australia) Tom Phillis	ESP; 3	FRA; 3	IOM; 3	NED -	BEL -	GER -	ULS -	DDR -	NAT -	ARG -		12	4th	0
1962	(United Kingdom) Tommy Robb	ESP -	FRA -	IOM -	NED; Ret	BEL -	GER -	ULS; 1	DDR; Ret	NAT -	ARG -		8	6th =	1
1962	(Switzerland) Luigi Taveri	ESP -	FRA -	IOM -	NED -	BEL; 3	GER -	ULS; 3	DDR -	NAT; NC	ARG -		8	8th	0
1962	(Japan) Teisuke Tanaka	ESP -	FRA -	IOM -	NED -	BEL -	GER; 3	ULS -	DDR -	NAT -	ARG -		4	15th	0
1963	(Federation of Rhodesia and Nyasaland) Jim Redman	ESP; 2	GER; 3	FRA; C	IOM; 1	NED; 1	BEL -	ULS; 1	DDR; 3	NAT; 2	ARG; 2	JPN; 1	44	**1st**	4
1963	(United Kingdom) Tommy Robb	ESP; 3	GER; 2	FRA; C	IOM; 5	NED; 5	BEL; 5	ULS; 3	DDR; 7	NAT; 6	ARG -	JPN; 8	20	4th	0
1963	(Switzerland) Luigi Taveri	ESP; 5	GER; NC	FRA; C	IOM; NC	NED; NC	BEL; 4	ULS; NC	DDR; 5	NAT; 3	ARG -	JPN; 5	13	5th	0
1963	(Japan) Kunimitsu Takahashi	ESP; 4	GER; NC	FRA; C	IOM; NC	NED	BEL; 6	ULS; 4	DDR	NAT	ARG	JPN	7	9th	0

Colour	Result
Gold	Winner
Silver	Second place
Bronze	Third place
Green	Points classification
Blue	Non-points classification
Blue	Non-classified finish (NC)
Purple	Retired, not classified (Ret)
Red	Did not qualify (DNQ)
Red	Did not pre-qualify (DNPQ)
Black	Disqualified (DSQ)
White	Did not start (DNS)
White	Withdrew (WD)
White	Race cancelled (C)
Blank	Did not practice (DNP)
Blank	Did not arrive (DNA)
Blank	Excluded (EX)

**Bold** – Pole
Italics – Fastest Lap

== Bibliography ==
- Dumas, François-Marie. "Honda RC 163 1962 - Moto Passion". www.moto-collection.org.
- Kortekaas, Joep. "Honda's Race History - 1962". www.vf750fd.com.
- Kortekaas, Joep. "Honda's Race History - 1963". www.vf750fd.com.
- McLaren, Peter (23 April 2014). "History of Motorcycle Grand Prix in Argentina". www.crash.net.
- Pereira, Chris (2014). Motorcycle GP Racing in the 1960s. David and Charles. ISBN 978-1-78711-879-9.
- Pereira, Chris (10 March 2026). 60s Speed: The Golden Age of Motorcycle Grand Prix Racing. David and Charles. ISBN 978-1-83644-076-5.
- Walker, Mick (2002). Mick Walker's Japanese Grand Prix Racing Motorcycles. Redline Books. ISBN 978-0-9531311-8-1.
