= Honda RC149 =

5 cylinder racing motorcycle

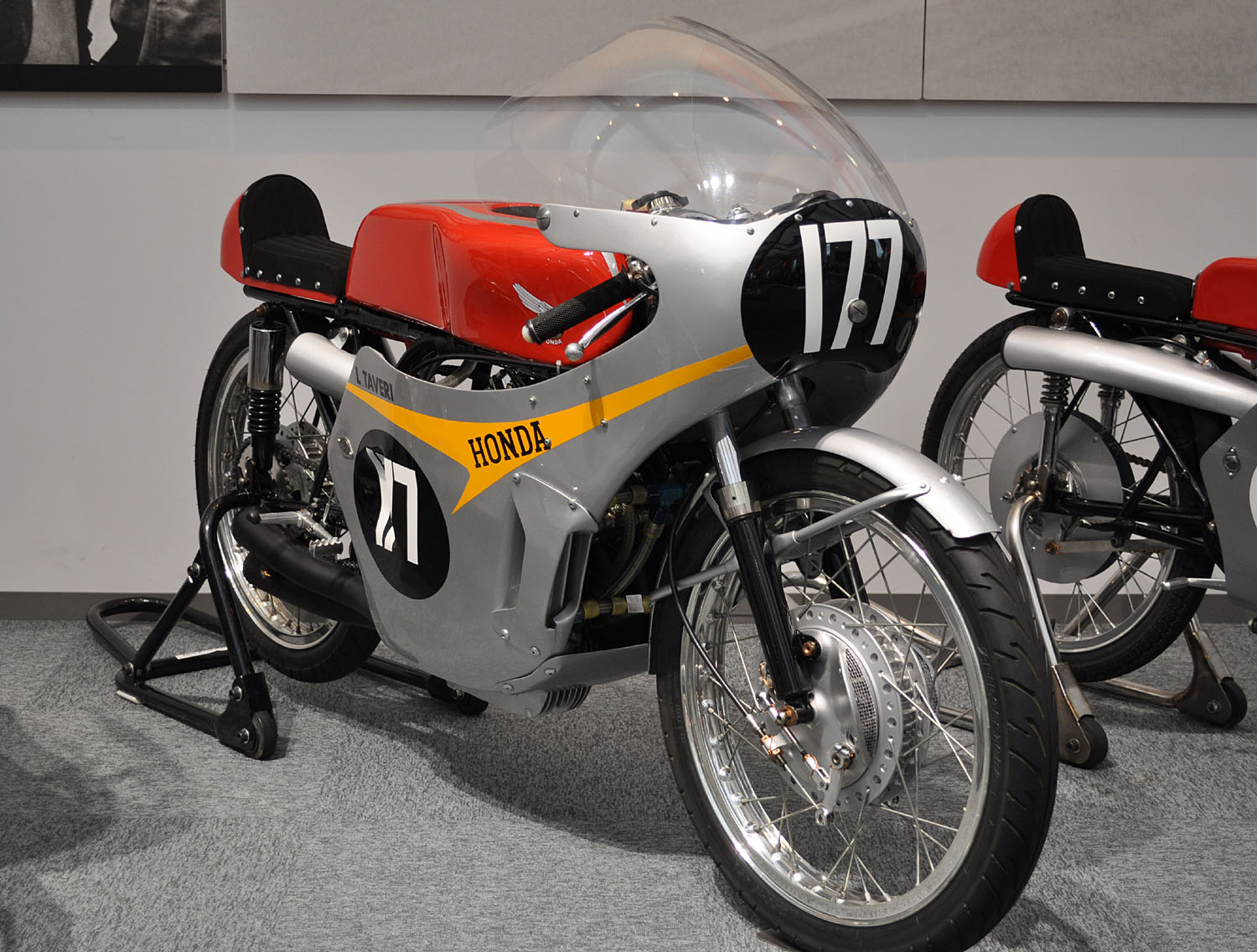
- Honda RC149
- Manufacturer: Honda Racing Service Club
- Parent company: Honda
- Production: 1966
- Assembly: Asaka, Saitama, Japan
- Engine: 124.4 cc (7.59 cu in) Air cooled inline 5 4 stroke
- Bore / stroke: 35.5 mm × 25.14 mm (1.398 in × 0.990 in)
- Compression ratio: 12:1
- Power: 38 bhp (28 kW) @ 20,500 rpm
- Transmission: 8 speed gearbox, chain drive
- Weight: 85.0 kg (187.4 lb) (dry)

The Honda RC149 is a Grand Prix racing motorcycle produced by Honda which raced in 1966. The technological advanced bike was a high-revving 125 cc (7.6 cu in) DOHC air-cooled inline 5. On the bike Luigi Taveri took the 125cc riders championship and Honda the constructors championship.

== Background ==
Honda had won 125cc World Championships in 1961, 1962 and 1965. In 1965 two strokes had improved and threatened Honda's dominance. An improved 125 was needed. The engineer put in charge of the project was 24 year old Shoichiro Irimajiri. (Note: Irimajiri also designed the twin cylinder 50 cc RC115, six cylinder RC166 and worked on the RA270 Formula 1 engine. Irimajiri later led the design teams for the Gold Wing and CBX.)

== RC148 ==
2 stroke engines, as used by competitors Suzuki and Yamaha, have a power stroke every crankshaft rotation, whereas 4 strokes as used by Honda only produce a power stroke every 2 rotations of the crankshaft. Soichiro Honda had already made a public commitment to make quieter, cleaner running, more efficient 4 strokes. The solution was to make the four stroke rev higher to produce more power strokes. To achieve this while maintaining reliability Irimajiri reduced reciprocating weight by using 5 cylinders and 4 valve heads.

Honda had a poor 1965 season. Even with the updated 4RC146 introduced at the Isle of Man the best result obtained was 2nd. At the final round in Japan Honda introduced a new 5 cylinder machine, the RC148. In the race Taveri has to retire whilst in the lead due to an oil leak.

The RC148 is effectively 2.5 50cc twins. Bore and stroke are 33 mm × 29 mm (1.3 in × 1.1 in) giving a capacity of 124 cc (7.6 cu in). It produces 34 bhp (25 kW) 20,000 rpm. The exhaust of cylinders 1, 2, 4 and 5 exit on the right and left of the bike. Cylinder 3's exhaust wraps around the left of the engine and then crosses over to exit under the rider's right leg.

== RC149 ==
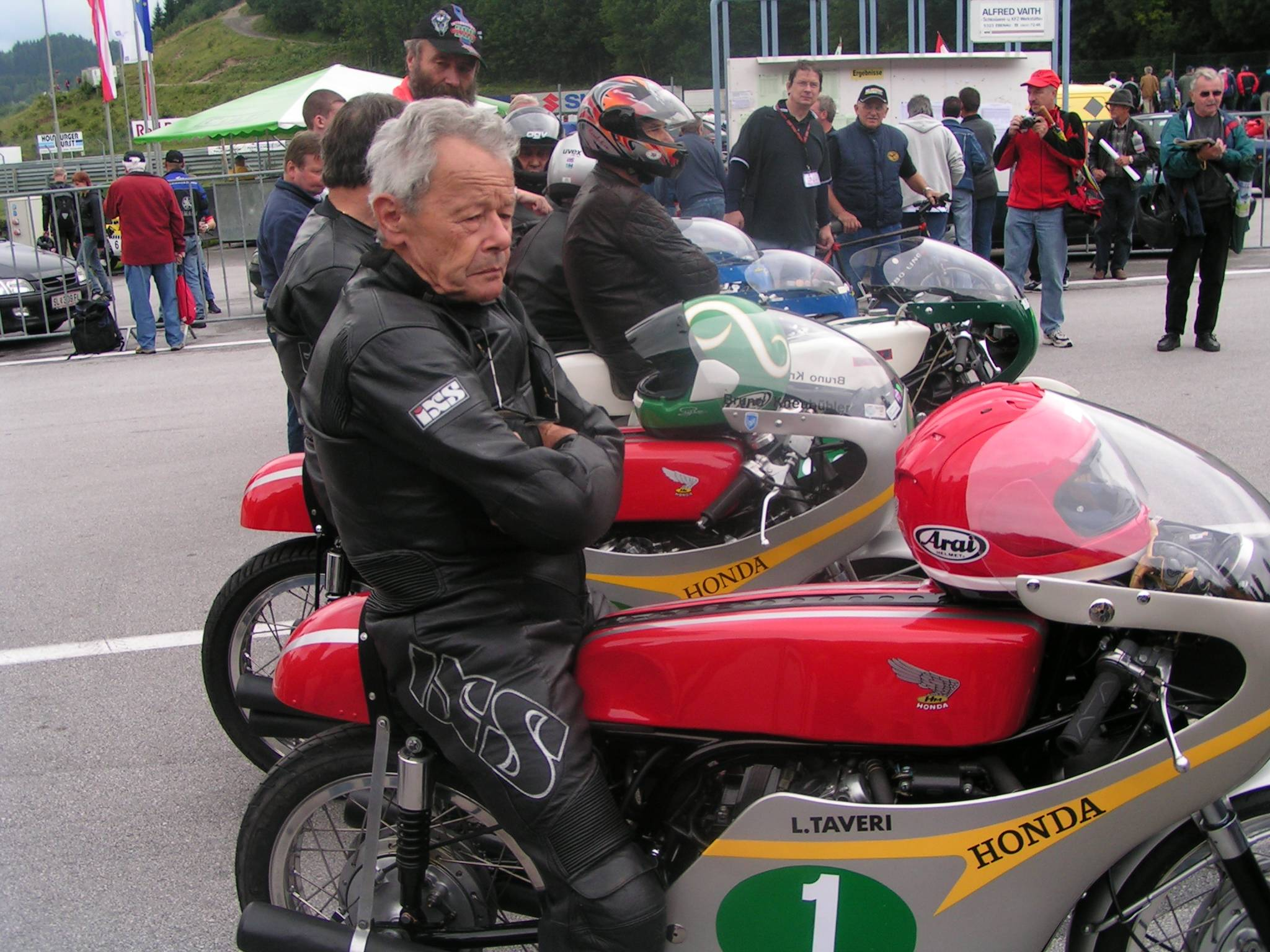
Luigi Taveri on a Honda RC149 at the Salzburgring (2006)

The RC149 was introduced for the 1966 season. The bore and stroke differed from the RC148 using the same 35.5 mm × 25.14 mm (1.398 in × 0.990 in) as the newly introduced 50cc RC116. Power was 38 bhp (28 kW) at 20,500 rpm. Twin oil coolers were fitted in the sides of the fairing and an oil temperature gauge fitted. The bike was difficult to ride with a narrow powerband starting at 18,000 rpm and a tendency to stall under 13,000 rpm.

The competition in 1966 in the 125cc championship was from the Yamahas of Phil Read and Bill Ivy. Taveri won the championship, winning 5 of the 9 rounds. Ralph Bryans rode a second RC149 and achieved 6 podiums, finishing third in the championship. At the Isle of Man Mike Hailwood joined them on a third RC149. The start of the race was delayed 3 hours and the temperature and weather changed. This required the bikes carburettors to be retuned, a tricky operation. The bikes ran unevenly in the race and Hailwood was the best finisher of the 3 Honda riders in 6th. Honda won the Constructors Championship. (Note: Honda won all five championships (50cc, 125cc, 250cc, 350cc and 500cc) in 1966. A feat that has never been equalled.)

In 1967 Honda did not compete in the 50cc and 125cc championships to concentrate on the larger capacity championships.

== Technical details ==
=== Engine ===
The 124.4 cc (7.59 cu in) air cooled inline 5 had a bore and stroke of 35.5 mm × 25 mm (1.40 in × 0.98 in) produced 38 bhp (28 kW) at 20,500 rpm.

The cylinders were split into two banks, one of 3 cylinders with a 120° crankshaft and the other a bank of two with a 180° crankshaft. The two crankshafts were connected together with gears. Where the two crankshafts met, between cylinders 3 and 4, there was a gear train to drive the camshafts. The crankcases were cast from magnesium and 4 valve heads were fitted.

The engine has wet sump lubrication with twin oil coolers fitted in the fairing and used electronic ignition. 5 carburettors were fitted and tuning was difficult. Each carburettor had 5 jets to adjust and were mounted on rubber stubs. Different length stubs were also part of the tuning process.

Transmission was via a multi-plate dry clutch, 8 speed gearbox and chain drive.

=== Cycle parts ===
2ls drum brakes were fitted to both wheels.

There was an unpainted strip in the polyester petrol tank to show fuel level.

== Racing results ==
Points were awarded to the top six finishers in each race. Only the best 7 races were counted in 1965 and 6 in 1966.

Position	1st	2nd	3rd	4th	5th	6th
Points	8	6	4	3	2	1

(key) (Races in italics indicate fastest lap) (Races in bold indicate pole position)

Year	Rider	1	2	3	4	5	6	7	8	9	10	11	12	Points	Rank	Wins
1965	(Switzerland) Luigi Taveri	USA	GER; NC	ESP; NC	FRA; NC	IOM; 2	NED; 5	DDR	CZE	ULS	FIN	NAT	JPN; Ret			
1966	(Switzerland) Luigi Taveri	ESP; 2	GER; 1	NED; 2	DDR; 1	CZE; 1	FIN; 2	ULS; 1	IOM; 8	NAT; 1	JPN			46	**1st**	5
1966	(Northern Ireland) Ralph Bryans	ESP; 3	GER; 2	NED; NC	DDR; 6	CZE; 2	FIN; 3	ULS; 2	IOM; 7	NAT; 2	JPN			32	**3rd**	0
1966	(United Kingdom) Mike Hailwood	ESP	GER	NED	DDR	TCH	FIN	ULS	IOM; 6	NAT	JPN			1	15th	0
