= Honda RC143 =

1960 Japanese motorcycle

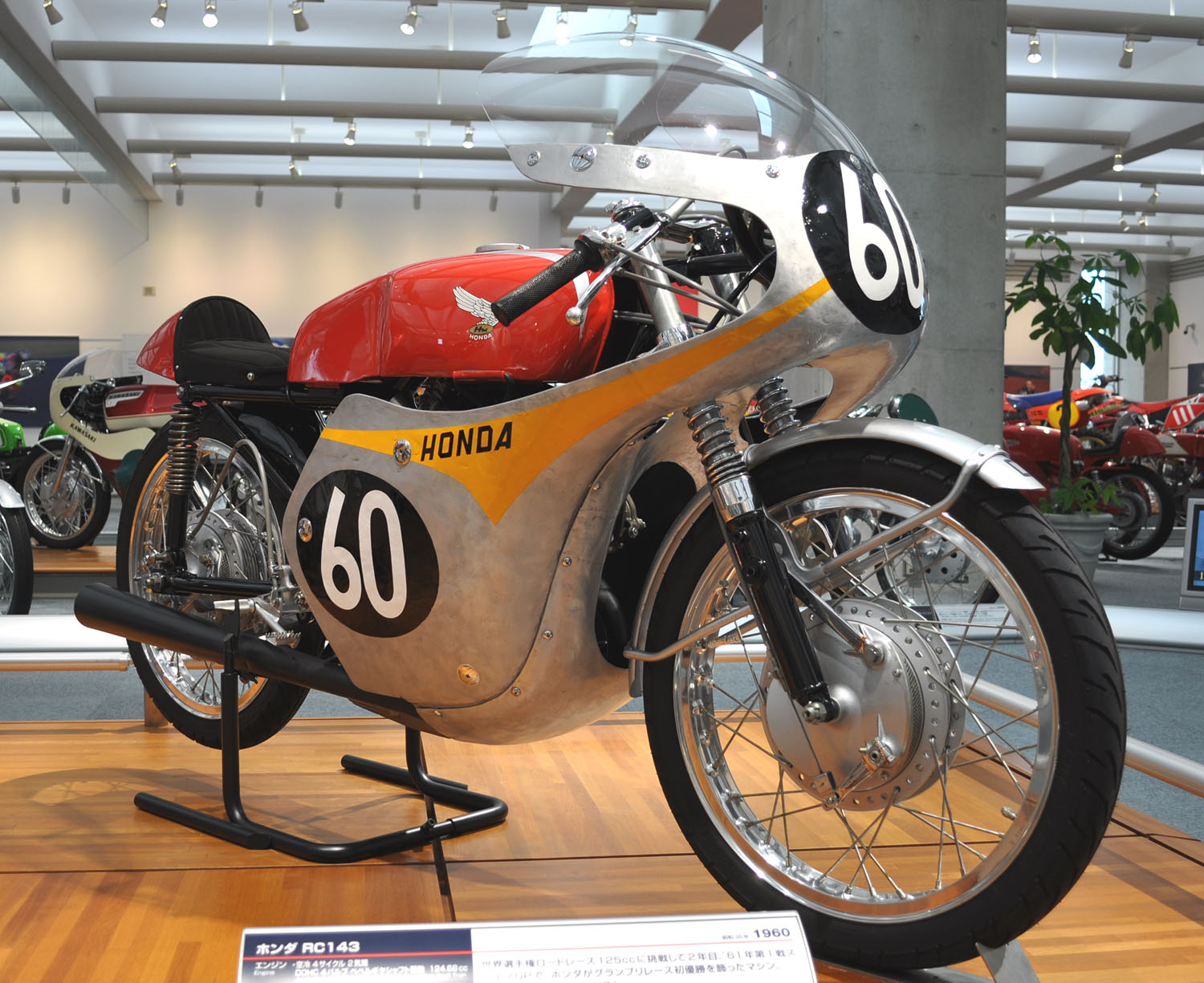
- Manufacturer: Honda
- Production: 1960
- Predecessor: Honda RC142
- Successor: Honda 2RC143
- Class: Grand Prix motorcycle racing 125cc class
- Engine: 124.6 cc (7.60 cu in) Four stroke, inline 2 cylinders, double over head camshafts
- Bore / stroke: 44 mm × 41 mm (1.7 in × 1.6 in)
- Transmission: 6-speed manual
- Weight: 93 kg (205 lb) (dry)

The Honda RC143 was the Honda racing team's 125cc Grand Prix motorcycle racer for the 1960 season, the first time the Honda team competed in an entire season's racing. The bike was a major step forward from the previous year's machines, and though still outpaced by its more experienced European rivals, it revealed to seasoned competitors like Luigi Taveri that Honda was a force to be reckoned with.

== Background and development ==
Following the team's international début at the 1959 Isle of Man TT, Honda had returned to Japan recognising that they still had a long way to go if they were to succeed in their ambition of winning one of the TT races. Honda had managed to salvage some honour by securing the team prize, but even their fastest rider Naomi Taniguchi had finished nearly four minutes behind the rider in front and almost eight minutes down on the race winner, Tarquinio Provini. For 1960, alongside a team of Japanese riders, Honda decided to recruit experienced privateer Tom Phillis to help them with technical feedback.

== Design ==
In contrast to the RC142, the air-cooled, four-stroke, twin-cylinder engine of the RC143 was canted forward by 35° to improve cooling and increase air flow to the newly designed Keihin carburettors. The engine featured double overhead camshafts, driven by a vertical shaft through bevel gears. The engine was said to produce 22 hp (16 kW) at 14,000 rpm. The leading link front forks, which had proved successful on Japanese dirt tracks had been identified as a particular weakness on tarmac and were replaced by more conventional telescopic forks for the Isle of Man. This change to the forks, along with the change to the engine design, helped move the bikes centre of gravity much further forward. The open-cradle frame was also considerably strengthened.

== World Championship ==
During the 1960 world championship Tom Phillis qualified second fastest for the Isle of Man 125cc race, but a crash in the 250cc event at Assen saw him replaced by his friend Jim Redman who stunned everyone by lapping two seconds faster than Phillis had managed. The RC143 finished in the points five times, the best results were two fourth places. Honda was third in the constructor championship behind the MV Agusta and MZ.

(key) (Races in bold indicate pole position; races in italics indicate fastest lap)

Year	Chassis	Rider	1	2	3	4	5	Points	Rank
			IOM	NED	BEL	ULS	NAT		
1960	Honda RC143	(Federation of Rhodesia and Nyasaland) Jim Redman		4	9		4	6	7th
1960	Honda RC143	(Japan) Giichi Suzuki	7	6	12			1	11th
1960	Honda RC143	(Japan) Naomi Taniguchi	6					1	12th
1960	Honda RC143	(Japan) Kunimitsu Takahashi					6	1	13th
1960	Honda RC143	(Japan) Sadao Shimazaki	8		8				-
1960	Honda RC143	(Japan) Moto Kitano	19		7				-
1960	Honda RC143	(Japan) Teisuke Tanaka	9						-
1960	Honda RC143	(Australia) Tom Phillis	10						-
1960	Honda RC143	(Netherlands) Jan Huberts		9					-
1960	Honda RC143	(Australia) Bob Brown			10				-
1960	Honda RC143	(Japan) Yukio Sato				8	7		-
1960	Honda RC143	(Japan) Sadao Fukada				7			-
1960	Honda RC143	(United Kingdom) G. Carter				9			-
1960	Honda RC143	(United Kingdom) N. Orr				10			-

Honda 2RC143
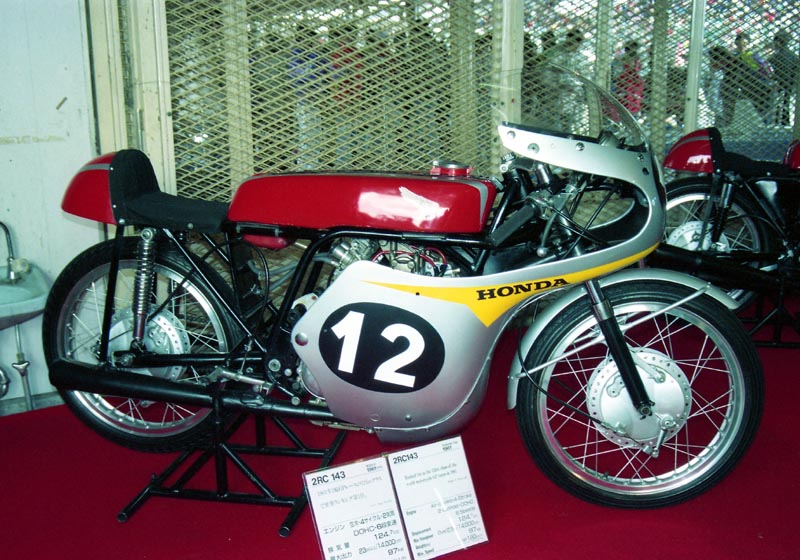
- Manufacturer: Honda
- Production: 1960
- Predecessor: Honda RC143
- Successor: Honda RC145
- Class: Grand Prix motorcycle racing 125cc class
- Engine: Four stroke, inline 2 cylinders, double over head camshafts
- Transmission: 6-speed manual
- Weight: 97 kg (214 lb) (dry)

== 2RC143 ==
For the 1961 season an improved version of the bike designed as 2RC143 was developed. It proved very successful, winning 8 out of the 11 races contested that season. Australian Tom Phillis won the world championship and Honda won the constructor championship as well. Other riders winning races on the Honda 2RC143 that year were: Luigi Taveri, Jim Redman, Kunimitsu Takahashi and Mike Hailwood.

== See also ==
- 1960 Grand Prix motorcycle racing season
- 1961 Grand Prix motorcycle racing season
