= Honda RC162 =

4 cylinder racing motorcycle

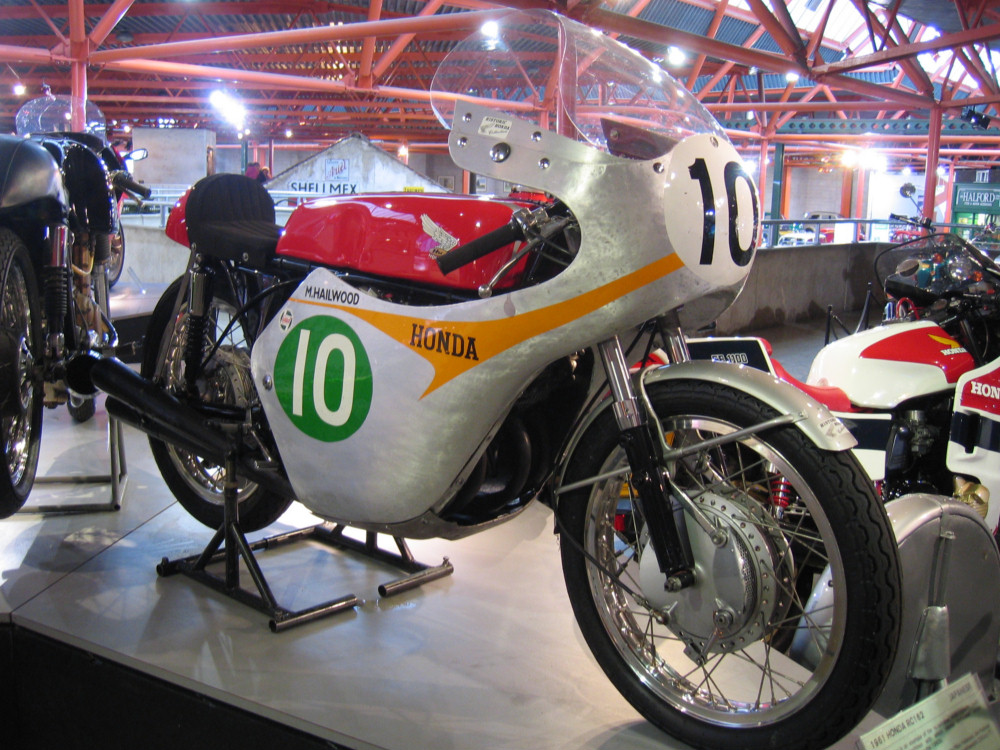
- Honda RC162
- Manufacturer: Honda
- Production: 1961
- Predecessor: Honda RC161
- Successor: Honda RC163
- Engine: 249 cc (15.2 cu in) air cooled DOHC inline 4
- Bore / stroke: 44 mm × 41 mm (1.7 in × 1.6 in)
- Compression ratio: 10.5:1
- Power: 40 bhp (30 kW) @ 14,000 rpm
- Ignition type: Coil
- Fuel delivery: 4 Keihin carburettors
- Transmission: Multi-plate dry clutch, 6 speed gearbox, chain drive
- Frame type: Open double loop
- Suspension: F: telescopic forks R: swinging arm
- Brakes: Drum brakes front & rear

The Honda RC162 is a 250 cc (15 cu in) air cooled DOHC inline 4 racing motorcycle that was manufactured by Honda in 1961 to compete in the 250cc World Championship. The machine won all 10 of the GPs it participated in. Rider Mike Hailwood won the World Championship on a RC162 and Honda won the Constructors Championship.

== History ==
A new 250 was produced for the 1961 season, the RC162, which was developed from the previous year's RC161. The bikes had new cycle parts and the engine was developed to produce 40 bhp (30 kW) at 14,000 rpm.

Honda had opened a new European Racing Headquarters in Hanover, Germany. They had 6 works racers for the 1961 season: Kunimitsu Takahashi, Sadao Shimazaki, Naomi Taniguchi, Moto Kitano, Jim Redman and Tom Phillis. They also lent 'works' bikes to selected dealers. Stan Hailwood of the Kings of Oxford chain of dealerships received one to be used by his son Mike. Another went to English dealer Bill Smith for John Hartle's use. Irish importer former racer Reg Armstrong received a bike for Bob McIntyre to use. Armstrong was also appointed as an adviser to the team. (Note: Armstrong became Honda Racing Team manager in 1962.)

Kitano won the 250 class in the inaugural non-championship US GP at the Daytona International Speedway in February.

At the championship season opener, the Spanish GP, the engines for the new bikes were not ready and the bikes were fitted with last year's engines. The Hondas were no match for Gary Hocking's MV. Hocking won the race with Phillis second.

In the next race at the fast Hockenheimring in Germany, and with the updated engines fitted, Takahashi won the race with Redman second. Takahashi became the first Japanese rider to win a Grand Prix. The dry sump lubrication system with the oil tank under the seat caused overheating problems and some bikes ran without a front mudguard and others without the belly pan to overcome this.

At the Isle of Man TT Kitano was replaced by Teisuke Tanaka. In the race McIntyre led and set a new lap record of 99.58 mph (160.26 km/h).. On the final circuit his bike seized handing the victory to Hailwood. (Note: Hailwood became the first person to win 3 TTs in the same year in 1961. He won the 125cc Lightweight TT on a Honda RC144, the 250cc Lightweight TT on a RC162 and the Senior (500cc) on a Manx Norton.) Honda took the top five places in both the 125cc and 250cc races which won them the Manufacturers’ Team Award.

McIntyre won the Ulster Grand Prix setting new race and lap records. At the following race at Monza McIntyre fell and broke his collarbone.

Soichiro Honda attended the penultimate race of the season in Sweden. Going into the race Hailwood led the championship by six points from Redman. In the race Hailwood initially led but was passed by Redman. Pushing hard Redman slid off. Although he recovered to finish 4th, Hailwood won the race and the championship.

None of the privateers attended the final race of the season in Argentina. Honda lent local racer Benedicto 'Chiche' Caldarella the bike usually used by McIntyre for the race. As McIntyre was tall the bike had been modified with a longer swinging arm to suit his stature. The longer swinging arm caused instabilities in the bike to be during the race. Caldarella pulled into the pits to have the bike checked but was directed into parc fermé by mistake. Having entered parc fermé he could not rejoin the race.

The bike used by Hailwood is on display at the National Motor Museum, Beaulieu, England.

In 1962 the UK concessionaire Honda UK lent Derek Minter an RC162 for the Isle of Man TT. Minter was reminded before the race that Redman was leading the championship on the works RC163, with the implication that he should not beat Redman in the race. Ignoring this Minter won the race which displeased Honda and affected the chance of a future factory ride.

== Technical details ==
=== Engine ===
The engine was a development of the previous year's RC160. The cylinders of the 249cc inline 4 were less forward inclined than previous engines at 30° and cast in alloy with steel liners. Spur gears between the centre cylinders drove the twin overhead camshafts. 4 valves per cylinder were fitted. Bore and stroke remained at 44 mm × 41 mm (1.7 in × 1.6 in) and each cylinder had its own round slide Keihin carburettor. The engine had dry sump lubrication and was 80 mm (3.1 in) narrower than its predecessor.

A new ignition system was fitted using a single coil for each two cylinders which fired on both compression and exhaust strokes.

A Multi-plate dry clutch took power to a 6 speed gearbox. Final drive was by chain.

=== Cycle parts ===
A completely new frame was used on the RC162, changing from a spine frame to an open double loop with the engine used as a stressed member. Made of chrome-molybdenum steel, various different tube sizes were used, the biggest being around the steering head.

Front forks were now Ceriani-type with internal springs. Rear suspension was a swinging arm with twin shock absorberss.

The drum brakes were larger those fitted to the RC161, the front being double sided. 18 inch wheels were used.

A new three piece fairing was fitted that had a belly pan that enclosed the underside of the engine.

== Racing results ==
Points were awarded to the top six finishers in each race. Only the best of six races were counted..

Position	1st	2nd	3rd	4th	5th	6th
Points	8	6	4	3	2	1

Year	Rider	1	2	3	4	5	6	7	8	9	10	11	Points	Rank	Wins
1961	(United Kingdom) Mike Hailwood	ESP	GER; 8	FRA; 2	IOM; 1	NED; 1	BEL; 3	DDR; 1	ULS; 2	NAT; 2	SWE; 1	ARG	44	**1st**	4
1961	(Australia) Tom Phillis	ESP; 2	GER; NC	FRA; 1	IOM; 2	NED; NC	BEL; 2	DDR; 4	ULS; 4	NAT; 3	SWE; 6	ARG; 1	38	**2nd**	2
1961	(Federation of Rhodesia and Nyasaland) Jim Redman	ESP; 4	GER; 2	FRA; 6	IOM; 3	NED; 3	BEL; 1	DDR; 2	ULS; 3	NAT; 1	SWE; 4	ARG; 3	36	**3rd**	2
1961	(Japan) Kunimitsu Takahashi	ESP; DNQ	GER; 1	FRA; 3	IOM; 4	NED	BEL	DDR; 3	ULS; 6	NAT	SWE; 3	ARG; 2	29	4th	1
1961	(United Kingdom) Bob McIntyre	ESP	GER	FRA	IOM; NC	NED; 2	BEL; NC	DDR; 8	ULS; 1	NAT; NC	SWE	ARG	14	5th	1
1961	(Switzerland) Luigi Taveri	ESP	GER	FRA	IOM	NED	BEL	DDR	ULS	NAT	SWE; 2	ARG	6	10th	0
1961	(Japan) Sadao Shimazaki	ESP	GER	FRA	IOM	NED	BEL; 4	DDR	ULS	NAT	SWE	ARG	3	13th =	0
1961	(Japan) Naomi Taniguchi	ESP	GER	FRA	IOM; 5	NED	BEL	DDR	ULS	NAT	SWE	ARG	2	16th	0
1961	(Japan) Teisuke Tanaka	ESP	GER	FRA	IOM	NED	BEL	DDR	ULS	NAT; 7	SWE	ARG	0	NC	0
1961	(Netherlands) Jan Huberts	ESP	GER	FRA	IOM	NED; Ret	BEL	DDR	ULS	NAT	SWE	ARG	0	NC	0
1961	(United Kingdom) John Hartle	ESP	GER	FRA	IOM	NED	BEL; NC	DDR	ULS; NC	NAT; NC	SWE	ARG	0	NC	0
1961	(Argentina) Benedicto Caldarella	ESP	GER	FRA	IOM	NED	BEL	DDR	ULS	NAT	SWE	ARG; Ret	0	NC	0
1962	(United Kingdom) Derek Minter	ESP	FRA	IOM; 1	NED	BEL	GER	ULS	DDR	NAT	FIN	ARG			

Colour	Result
Gold	Winner
Silver	Second place
Bronze	Third place
Green	Points classification
Blue	Non-points classification
Blue	Non-classified finish (NC)
Purple	Retired, not classified (Ret)
Red	Did not qualify (DNQ)
Red	Did not pre-qualify (DNPQ)
Black	Disqualified (DSQ)
White	Did not start (DNS)
White	Withdrew (WD)
White	Race cancelled (C)
Blank	Did not practice (DNP)
Blank	Did not arrive (DNA)
Blank	Excluded (EX)

**Bold** – Pole
Italics – Fastest Lap
