= Honda RC170 =

- Manufacturer: Honda
- Production: 1962
- Successor: Honda RC171
- Engine: 283 cc (17.3 cu in) air cooled DOHC inline 4
- Bore / stroke: 47 mm × 41 mm (1.9 in × 1.6 in)
- Power: 50 bhp (37 kW) @ 13,500 rpm
- Ignition type: Magneto
- Fuel delivery: 4 Keihin carburettors
- Transmission: Multi-plate dry clutch, 6 speed gearbox, chain drive
- Frame type: Open double loop
- Suspension: F: telescopic forks R: swinging arm
- Brakes: Drum brakes front & rear

The Honda RC170 is a 283 cc (17.3 cu in) air cooled DOHC inline 4 racing motorcycle that was manufactured by Honda in 1962 to compete in the 350cc World Championship. It is an overbored version of the 250 cc (15 cu in) Honda RC163 and won one of the two championship races it was entered in before being replaced with the 339.4 cc (20.71 cu in) Honda RC171.

== History ==
Having won both the 125 and 250cc championships in 1961, Honda decided to expand its participation. They entered the 350 and the newly created 50cc championships in 1962. For the 350 class they produced an overbored version of the 250 four, increasing the bore by 3mm from 44 to 47 mm (1.7 to 1.9 in) to compete with the dominance of the 350 MVs.

The bike was initially used by Bob McIntyre in British national races prior to the start of the GP season. In practice for the season opener at Mallory Park McIntyre, who was unsighted, hit the fallen Matchless G50 of Tom Thorp damaging the RC170. The bike was not repaired in time for the next week's Hutchinson 100 at Silverstone. At Oulton Park on Easter Monday McIntyre got away in the lead but the bike started misfiring dropping him back to 10th. The misfire cleared and McIntyre fought his way back to second chasing leader Alan Shepherd until a puncture caused him to retire on the last lap. The following Sunday he gave the bike its first win at Mallory Park.

At the GP season opener, the 1962 Isle of Man TT, a second bike was supplied for Jim Redman. Redman was persuaded by Honda 250cc teammate Tom Phillis to let him race the 350. In the race Phillis got away first but was passed by the MVs of Gary Hocking and Mike Hailwood. On the second lap, pushing hard to stay with the MVs, Phillis crashed at Laurel Bank and received fatal injuries. McIntyre, who was also chasing the MVs, suffered an engine failure at Keppel Gate. Phillis' death had a profound effect on his friends Hocking and Redman. Hocking won the Senior TT and then raced at the post-TT meeting at Mallory Park. He then flew to Italy and told Count Domenico Agusta he was retiring. The Count released him from his contract. Redman was also going to retire but was persuaded by McIntyre to keep riding.

Redman won the next GP at Assen. McIntyre retired early in the race after the oil leaked out of his machine.

On 6 August at Oulton Park McIntyre led the 350 race, setting the fastest lap, until the engine of his Honda died on lap 8. In the 500 race McIntyre crashed heavily and was badly injured. He died 9 days later from his injuries. Following the deaths of Phillis and McIntyre, Honda tried to sign Alan Shepherd to race the 350 but this fell through. Tommy Robb was selected to ride the second 350.

At the third GP of the season, the Ulster Grand Prix, Honda provided a new 340cc machine, the RC171.

== Bibliography ==
- Falloon, Ian (31 January 2022). The book of the classic MV Agusta Fours. David & Charles. ISBN 978-1-78711-836-2.
- Guntrip, Bob (13 October 2015). Racing Line: British motorcycle racing in the golden age of the big single. David & Charles. ISBN 978-1-78711-337-4.
- Kortekaas, Joep. "Honda's Race History - 1961". www.vf750fd.com.
- Kortekaas, Joep. "Honda's Race History - 1962". www.vf750fd.com.
- Nicholls, B. R. (1 August 1962). "Late News From England". Cycle World.
- Pereira, Chris (2014). Motorcycle GP Racing in the 1960s. David and Charles. ISBN 978-1-78711-879-9.
- Scott, Michael (26 June 2025). MotoGP: The Illustrated History 2023. Headline. ISBN 978-1-0354-3557-9.
- Walker, Mick (2002). Mick Walker's Japanese Grand Prix Racing Motorcycles. Redline Books. ISBN 978-0-9531311-8-1.
- Walker, Mick (September 2004). The BSA Gold Star. Redline Books. ISBN 978-0-9544357-3-8.
- Wright, David (30 November 2013). 100 Years of the Isle of Man TT: A Century of Motorcycle Racing - Updated Edition covering 2007 - 2012. Crowood. ISBN 978-1-84797-648-2.
