= Honda RC161 =

4 cylinder racing motorcycle

- Manufacturer: Honda
- Production: 1960
- Predecessor: Honda RC160
- Successor: Honda RC162
- Engine: 249 cc (15.2 cu in) Air cooled DOHC inline 4
- Bore / stroke: 44 mm × 41 mm (1.7 in × 1.6 in)
- Power: 38 bhp (28 kW) @ 14,000 rpm
- Ignition type: Magneto
- Fuel delivery: 4 Keihin carburettors
- Transmission: Multi-plate dry clutch, 6 speed gearbox, chain drive
- Frame type: Spine
- Suspension: F: telescopic fork R: swinging arm
- Brakes: Drum brakes front & rear
- Wheelbase: 1,400 mm (55 in)
- Weight: 128 kg (282 lb) (dry)

The Honda RC161 is a 250 cc (15 cu in) air cooled DOHC inline 4 racing motorcycle that was manufactured by Honda in 1960. It was used by Honda for its inaugural season in the 250cc World Championship. Although the bike didn't win a race the results were good enough for Honda to finish 2nd in the Manufacturers Championship.

== History ==
Having raced the 125cc RC171 as well as its updated version the RC172 and the 250 RC160 in Japan and the 125 at the 1959 Isle of Man TT, Honda entered the 1960 world championship. Both the 125 and the 250 had been redesigned, the 250 to the RC161.

Honda split their Japanese riders into two teams. Moto Kitano, Naomi Taniguchi and Giichi Suzuki would ride the bikes for the first three races and Kunimitsu Takahashi, Kenjirō Tanaka and Yukio Satoh taking over for the rest of the season.

As well as their Japanese riders Honda drafted in Australian riders, Bob Brown and Tom Phillis, (Note: Phillis had written to Honda in Japan asking for a ride in 1960 after being impressed by the Honda team's efficiency at the 1959 IOM TT.) for their experience of the European circuits and western bikes. Honda also tried to recruit John Hartle but a conflict with oil contracts prevented this.

Jim Redman was brought into the team after Phillis fell during practice for the Dutch TT and broke his collar bone. Taniguchi was also injured in practice and local racer Jan Huberts took his place for the race.

The bikes weren't performing as well as expected against the opposition and the team withdrew from the Belgian GP and spent the time improving the bikes. The upgrades worked and at the German Grand Prix Kenjirō Tanaka became the first person to achieve a podium for Honda by finishing third although the celebrations were muted following Bob Brown's fatal crash on the 250 during practice.

The season's best results were a 2nd for Phillis in the Ulster GP and a 2nd for Redman at Monza. Honda finished second in the constructors championship.

The RC161 was retired in favour of the updated RC162 for the 1961 season. However, the new engines were not ready for the first race of the season so the bikes were fitted with RC161 engines for that race.

=== Preserved examples ===
At the end the 1960 season Honda had 8 RC161s and around 20 engines. 3 or 4 bikes plus spares were sent to Honda USA for selected teams in Southern California to campaign in domestic US races. One was written off at Riverside in 1964. Once the machines were no longer usable the teams were allegedly told to dispose of the bikes by throwing them in the Pacific Ocean.

A display bike was built from spares and was given to Honda US who displayed it in the lobby of their California headquarters. It was later donated to the Henry Ford Museum. It is now loaned to and on display at the AMA Motorcycle Hall of Fame in Pickerington, Ohio, US.

Another bike was sent to the father of Kel Carruthers in Australia who prepared it for his son to race in domestic races. Carruthers won 5 Australian championships on the bike. It was retired in 1968 when the crankshaft broke. When Carruthers retired from racing he moved to El Cajon, California taking the bike, on which he'd won the most races in his career, with him. It was mounted on the wall above the bar in his house. The bike was later purchased and restored by the Barber Vintage Motorsports Museum in Birmingham, Alabama, US. The museum have also built a replica that is ridden at vintage events.

== Technical details ==
=== Engine ===
Although using the same architecture as the RC160, the engine had been totally redesigned for the RC161. The cylinders had been inclined forward 35° to improve cooling and airflow to the carburettors, and the cylinders were cast as part of the top crankcase. Drive to the double overhead camshafts was now by gears between the cylinders. These gears also drove the magneto. Bore and stroke remained at 44 mm × 41 mm (1.7 in × 1.6 in). The various covers for the engine were cast in elektron. Each cylinder had its own Keihin carburettor. Initially these had separate float Chambers and a long bellmouth with steep downdraft angle. These were later replaced with concentric carbs with a short bellmouth inline with the inlet tract.

A Multi-plate dry clutch took power to a 6 speed gearbox. Final drive was by chain.

=== Cycle parts ===
The tubular steel spine frame used the engine as a stressed member. Front suspension was by telescopic forks and a swinging arm was fitted at the rear.

The wheels used magnesium alloy hubs with drum brakes, the front being a double-sided twin leading shoe item.

== Racing results ==
Points were awarded to the top six finishers in each race. Only the four best races were counted.

Position	1st	2nd	3rd	4th	5th	6th
Points	8	6	4	3	2	1

Year	Rider	1	2	3	4	5	6	Points	Rank	Wins
1960	(Federation of Rhodesia and Nyasaland) Jim Redman	IOM	NED; 8	BEL	GER; NC	ULS; 3	NAT; 2	10	4th	0
1960	(Australia) Tom Phillis	IOM; NC	NED; DNS	BEL	GER	ULS; 2	NAT	6	6th	0
1960	(Japan) Kunimitsu Takahashi	IOM	NED	BEL	GER; 6	ULS; 5	NAT; 4	6	7th	0
1960	(Japan) Kenjirō Tanaka	IOM	NED	BEL	GER; 3	ULS	NAT	4	9th	0
1960	(Australia) Bob Brown	IOM; 4	NED	BEL	GER	ULS	NAT	3	11th	0
1960	(Japan) Moto Kitano	IOM; 5	NED	BEL	GER	ULS	NAT	2	14th =	0
1960	(Italy) Gilberto Milani	IOM	NED	BEL	GER	ULS	NAT; 5	2	14th =	0
1960	(Japan) Naomi Taniguchi	IOM; 6	NED; DNS	BEL	GER	ULS	NAT	1	17th =	0
1960	(Japan) Yukio Satoh	IOM	NED	BEL	GER; 7	ULS; 7	NAT; 6	1	17th =	0
1960	(Netherlands) Jan Huberts	IOM	NED; 7	BEL	GER	ULS	NAT	0	NC	0
1960	(Japan) Giichi Suzuki	IOM; DNF	NED	BEL	GER	ULS	NAT	0	NC	0

Colour	Result
Gold	Winner
Silver	Second place
Bronze	Third place
Green	Points classification
Blue	Non-points classification
Blue	Non-classified finish (NC)
Purple	Retired, not classified (Ret)
Red	Did not qualify (DNQ)
Red	Did not pre-qualify (DNPQ)
Black	Disqualified (DSQ)
White	Did not start (DNS)
White	Withdrew (WD)
White	Race cancelled (C)
Blank	Did not practice (DNP)
Blank	Did not arrive (DNA)
Blank	Excluded (EX)

**Bold** – Pole
Italics – Fastest Lap
