= Honda RC160 =

4 cylinder racing motorcycle

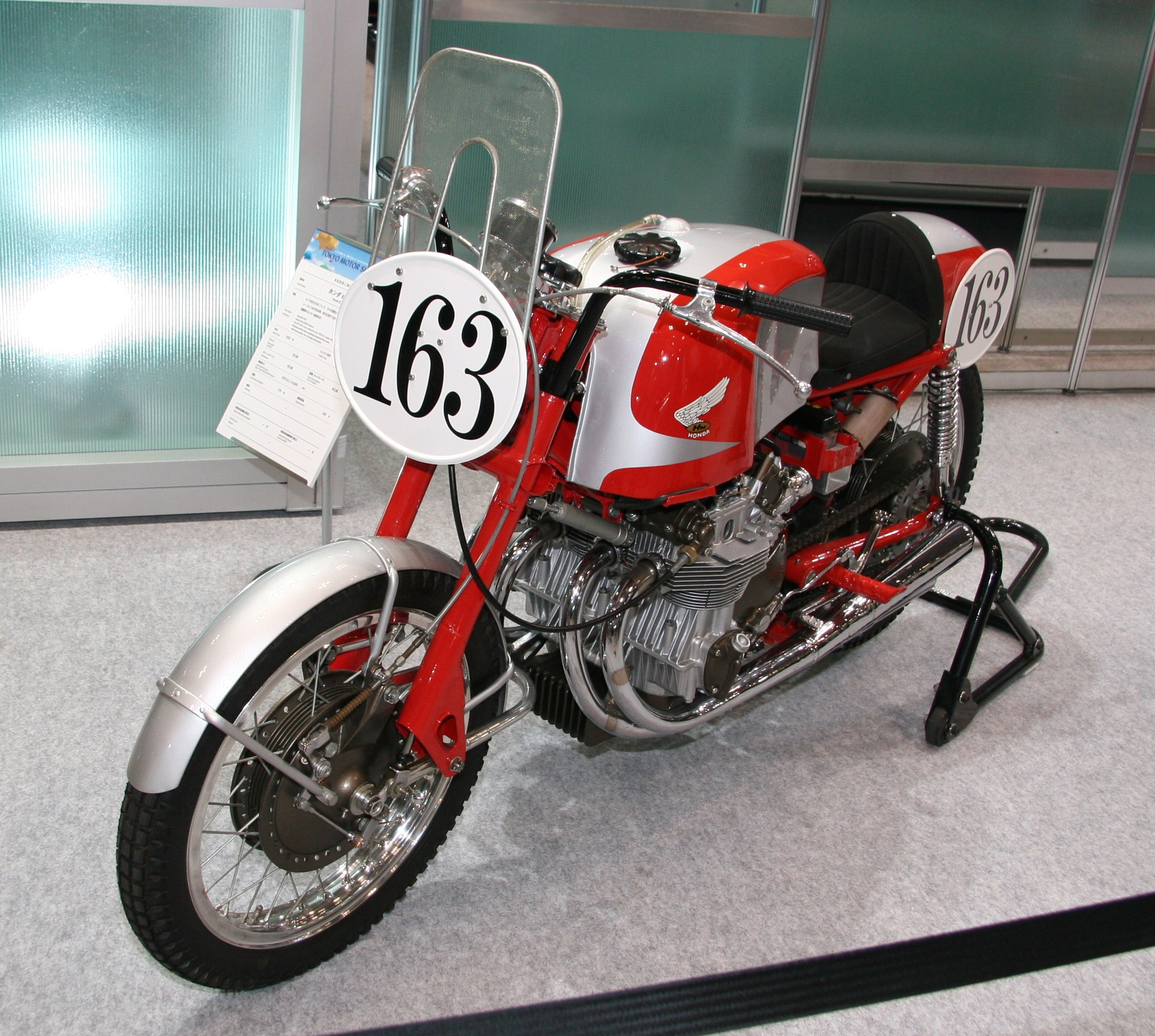
- Honda RC160 on display at the 2009 Tokyo Motor Show.
- Manufacturer: Honda
- Production: 1959
- Successor: Honda RC161
- Engine: 249 cc (15.2 cu in) Air cooled DOHC inline 4
- Bore / stroke: 44 mm × 41 mm (1.7 in × 1.6 in)
- Compression ratio: 10.5:1
- Top speed: 160 km/h (99 mph)
- Power: 35 bhp (26 kW) @ 14,000 rpm
- Ignition type: Coil
- Fuel delivery: 4 Keihin carburettors
- Transmission: Multi-plate dry clutch, 5 speed gearbox, chain drive
- Frame type: Tube & sheet metal backbone
- Suspension: F: leading link R: swinging arm
- Brakes: Drum brakes front & rear
- Tyres: F: 275x18 R: 300x18
- Wheelbase: 1,310 mm (52 in)
- Weight: 124 kg (273 lb) (dry)

The Honda RC160 is a 249 cc (15.2 cu in) air cooled DOHC inline 4 racing motorcycle manufactured by Honda in 1959. It was the first four cylinder machine produced by Honda. It was also the first model to use 4 valves per cylinder. Although never raced outside Japan, the layout formed the basis of Honda's participation in 250cc world championship during the early 1960s.

== History ==
In 1954 Soichiro Honda thought that the future growth of Honda depended on expanding outside Japan. He also thought that racing would be a way into European markets. He visited the IOM TT that year and realised that Honda needed to rethink its technology to compete.

Once back in Japan he set up a racing department with engineers Tadashi Kume and Kimio Shimmura to develop a 125cc racer under the supervision of Kiyoshi Kawashima. A DOHC twin, the RC141, was developed with the intention of competing in the TT.

Honda realised that to succeed in the British market he needed to also compete in the 250 class. A four cylinder 250 was designed that drew heavily on the 125. Honda was interested in combustion efficiency and discovered large quantities of unburnt hydrocarbons were present in the exhaust. This meant the engine was not working efficiently. This led to combustion chamber modifications and the use of 4 valves per cylinder, a first for Honda.

The design of the early Honda racing machines being influenced by the NSU Rennmax and NSU 500 (Note: On a previous visit to Europe Soichiro Honda had purchased race bike from NSU and Mondial and sent them back to Japan.) is given in some sources, other sources dispute this.

The RC160 competed in the 1959 All-Japan Championship. At its debut at the Mount Asama meeting (Note: The Mount Asama meeting, otherwise known as the Asama Highland Race, Asama Volcano Race or All Japan Motorcycle Endurance Road Race, was first run in 1955 on public roads around Mount Asama. The course was 19.2 km (11.9 mi) long. In 1957 a shorter permanent facility was built, the Asama Kogen Automobile Test Course, by the Japan Motorcycle Sports Association, a conglomerate of manufacturers. 1959 was the last year the race was run due to safety concerns. The facility was later used for rallying.) RC160s took 5 of the 6 top places, 4th place going to a privately entered Honda Dream. Sadao Shimazaki won the race. As the surface of the Mount Asama track was cinders, knobbly tyres and a fly screen were used.

== Technical details ==
=== Engine ===
The engine design was effectively a doubled up 125 twin. It used a horizontally split crankcase with drive to the double overhead camshafts by a shaft and bevel drive on the righthand side. 4 valve heads are fitted. Bore and stroke are 44 mm × 41 mm (1.7 in × 1.6 in) and compression ratio 10.5:1. Unlike the 125, which used a magneto, ignition was by 4 coils. Each cylinder has its own Keihin carburettor. Engine output is 35 bhp (26 kW) at 14,000 rpm.

Transmission is through a Multi-plate dry clutch to a 5 speed gearbox. Final drive is by chain.

=== Cycle parts ===
Cycle parts were based on the 125 but redesigned to take the extra weight and power of the 250. A tube and sheet steel spine frame that used the engine as a stressed member was used. Leading link front forks were fitted and rear suspension was by a swinging arm. 200 mm (7.9 in) drum brakes were fitted, the front being twin leading shoe.
