= Honda RC116 =

Racing motorcycle

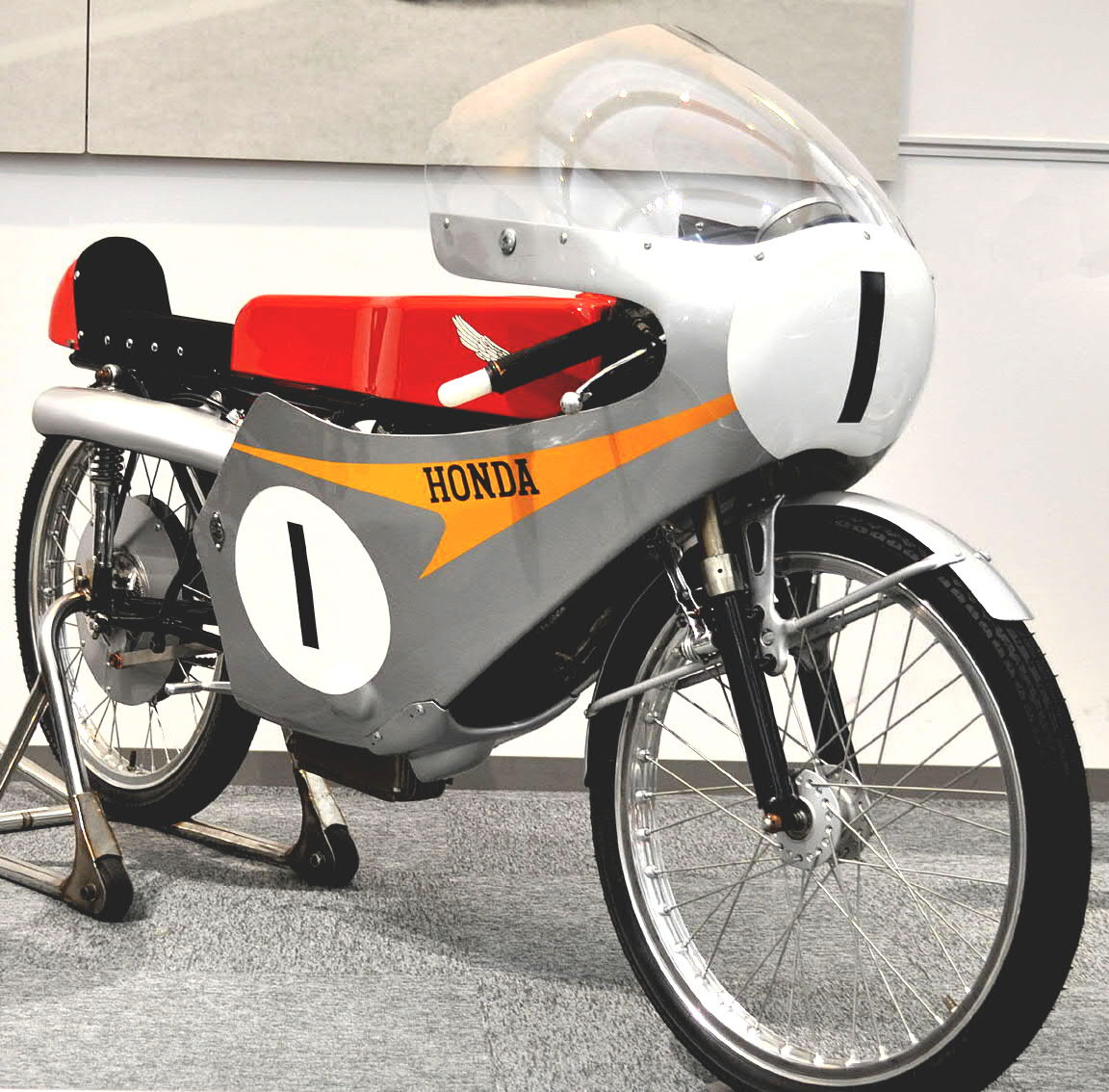
- RC116 with cable-actuated front caliper rim brakes having shoes/blocks directly acting on the aluminium-alloy wheel rim-sides - the airflow smoothing discs seen on the rear are absent from the front wheel in this image
- Manufacturer: Honda
- Predecessor: RC115
- Class: racing (50cc class)
- Engine: 49.77 cc 4T, 4 valve, air cooled, four stroke, DOHC parallel-twin.
- Bore / stroke: 35.5 mm × 25.14 mm (1.398 in × 0.990 in)
- Top speed: 95 mph (153 km/h)
- Power: 13.7 hp (10.2 kW) @ 21,500 rpm
- Transmission: 9-speed
- Wheelbase: 121 cm
- Dimensions: L: 174 cm W: 39 cm
- Seat height: 65 cm
- Weight: 110.2lbs (dry)
- Fuel capacity: 8 liters

The Honda RC116 was a race motorcycle built by Honda Japan for the 50 cc class of Grand Prix motorcycle racing in the 1966 season. The motorcycle was a development of the previous RC115 version.

The RC116 won three races from six during that season. Ralph Bryans finished second in the world championship, Luigi Taveri third and Honda won the constructors title.

For their Ultra-Lightweight class (50 cc) Grand Prix race bikes during the 1964, 1965 and 1966 race seasons, Honda re-introduced the 1920s format of cable-actuated caliper rim brakes with shoes/blocks directly acting on the aluminium rim-sides (alloy wheel rim), creating almost a 'consumable' item from the wheels, but dispensing with heavy conventional brake components, and allowing for experimentation with lightweight airflow-smoothing discs covering the wheel-hubs and centre-part of the spokes.

== See also ==
- 1966 Grand Prix motorcycle racing season
