= Yamaha RD56 =

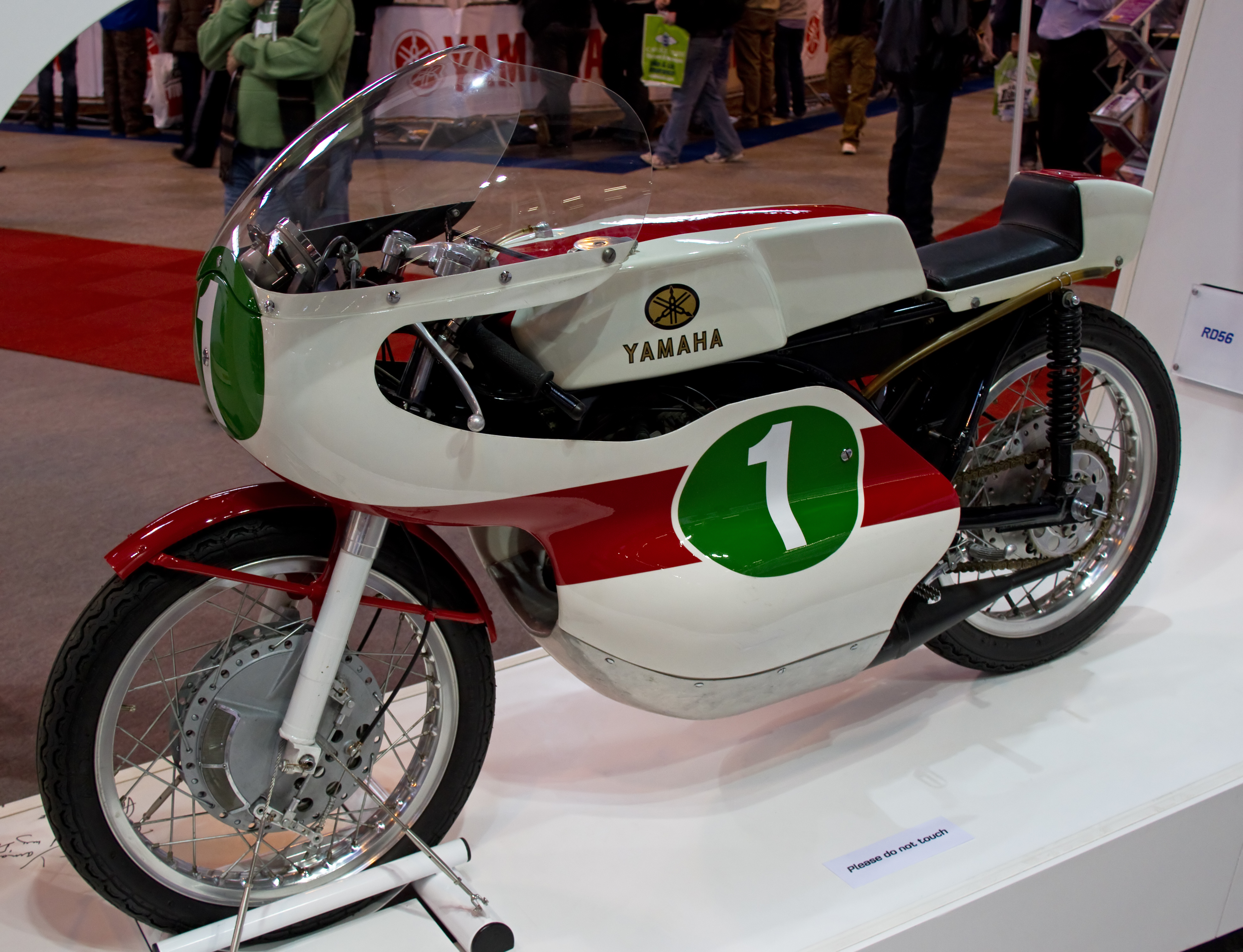
- Manufacturer: Yamaha Motor Company
- Production: 1963–1964
- Predecessor: Yamaha RD48
- Successor: Yamaha RD05
- Engine: 250cc two-stroke

The Yamaha RD56 was a two stroke 250cc Grand Prix racing motorcycle. It had two 56x50mm cylinders, disk valves and an Oldham coupler joining the crank shafts. Power was 47 bhp at 11,000rpm. Although the engine was essentially the same as that of the RD48, the frame was a new design based on the Norton Featherbed. It featured a 7 speed gearbox.

It was ridden by Yoshikazu Sunako, Fumio Ito, and Hiroshi Hasegawa for the 1963 Grand Prix season.

The engine was improved for the 1964 season generating a claimed 50 bhp at 11,000 rpm. Phil Read joined the Yamaha team and narrowly beat Redman to become Grand Prix World Champion.

Hiroshi Hasegawa won the 1967 Macau Grand Prix.

== Bibliography ==
MacKellar, Colin (28 August 1995). Yamaha: All Factory and Production Road-Racing Two-Strokes from 1955 to 1993. UK: The Crowood Press Ltd. p. 191. ISBN 1-85223-920-4.
