= Honda RC110 =

Honda RC110 / RC111
- Manufacturer: Honda
- Production: 1961–1962
- Successor: Honda RC112
- Class: Grand Prix motorcycle racing 50 cc class
- Engine: Four-stroke, single-cylinder, double overhead camshaft
- Bore / stroke: 40 mm × 39 mm (1.6 in × 1.5 in); 40.4 mm × 39 mm (1.59 in × 1.54 in)
- Compression ratio: 10.5:1
- Top speed: 140 km/h (87 mph)
- Power: 7.1 kW (9.5 hp) @ 14,000 rpm
- Transmission: Five-speed manual Six-speed manual Eight-speed manual Nine-speed manual
- Frame type: Steel
- Suspension: Front: Telescopic fork with central hydraulic damper Rear: Swingarm with hydraulic dampers
- Brakes: Front: Central drum Rear: Central drum
- Tires: Front: 2.00×18; Rear: 2.00×18
- Weight: 45 kg (99 lb) (dry); 60 kg (130 lb) (wet)

The Honda RC110 was the Honda racing team's first 50cc Grand Prix motorcycle racer. It was conceived in 1961 and raced during the 1962 season. As the machine was developed during the season, it was renamed the RC111 and most surviving Honda records do not distinguish between the two designations. Despite extensive development efforts throughout the season by the factory, the bike achieved only a single Grand Prix victory.

== Background and development ==
Since their arrival in Grand Prix racing in 1959, the Honda team had impressed everyone with their commitment and professionalism. Buoyed by the team's success in the 1961 125cc World Championship, with booming sales of Honda's 50cc Super Cub road bike and the Sports Cub C110, and the announcement by the Fédération Internationale Motocycliste of a 50cc World Championship for motorcycles for 1962, it was perhaps inevitable that the team would be keen to participate in this new category.

== Design ==
The engine was an advanced four-stroke single-cylinder (and was sometimes described as a shrunken half of an RC145). The cylinder axis was inclined at 35°. Two overhead camshafts in a four-valve head were driven by spur gears. The engine was said to produce 9.5 bhp at 14,000 rpm. The gearbox had five speeds.

== Racing history ==
The RC110 was displayed at the 1961 Tokyo Motor show in November 1961 and made its GP début at the 1962 Spanish GP in Barcelona by which time the number of gears had been increased to six. Despite this the bikes were easily out-gunned by the two-stroke opposition and this was Honda's first serious defeat since 1960.

A massive effort at the factory meant that for the French GP just one week later, the bikes were fitted with eight gears and then, another three weeks after that, for the IOM GP two completely new bikes arrived, now revving up to 17,000 and fitted with nine-speed gearboxes. Despite all this effort, Honda's 50cc machines still could not match the success of their larger brethren. Averaging over 120 km/h around the TT course, Luigi Taveri and Tommy Robb could still only manage second and third places and although on a damp track at the Finnish GP, Luigi Taveri did manage to grab a single victory, overall the 1962 50cc season was a humiliation for the Honda team.

=== World Championship results table ===
(key) (Races in bold indicate pole position; races in italics indicate fastest lap)

Year	Chassis* (Note: No official records exist of which Honda machine this rider raced or which machine was raced at which circuit.)	Rider	1	2	3	4	5	6	7	8	9	10
			ESP	FRA	IOM	NED	BEL	GER	DDR	NAT	FIN	ARG
1962	Honda RC110 / RC111*	(Switzerland) Luigi Taveri	3	3	2	9	3	4	4	6	1	
1962	Honda RC110	(United Kingdom) Tommy Robb	5	4	3	11		7	5	Ret	2	
1962	Honda RC110 / RC111*	(Japan) Kunimitsu Takahashi	6	2								
1962	Honda*	(Australia) Tom Phillis	8									
1962	Honda RC110	(United Kingdom) Derek Minter			9							
1962	Honda*	(Japan) Sadao Shimazaki			10		11	Ret				
1962	Honda CR110 5 speed	(Netherlands) Cees van Dongen				10						
1962	Honda*	(Japan) Teisuke Tanaka							7	Ret	5	

== Honda CR110 ==
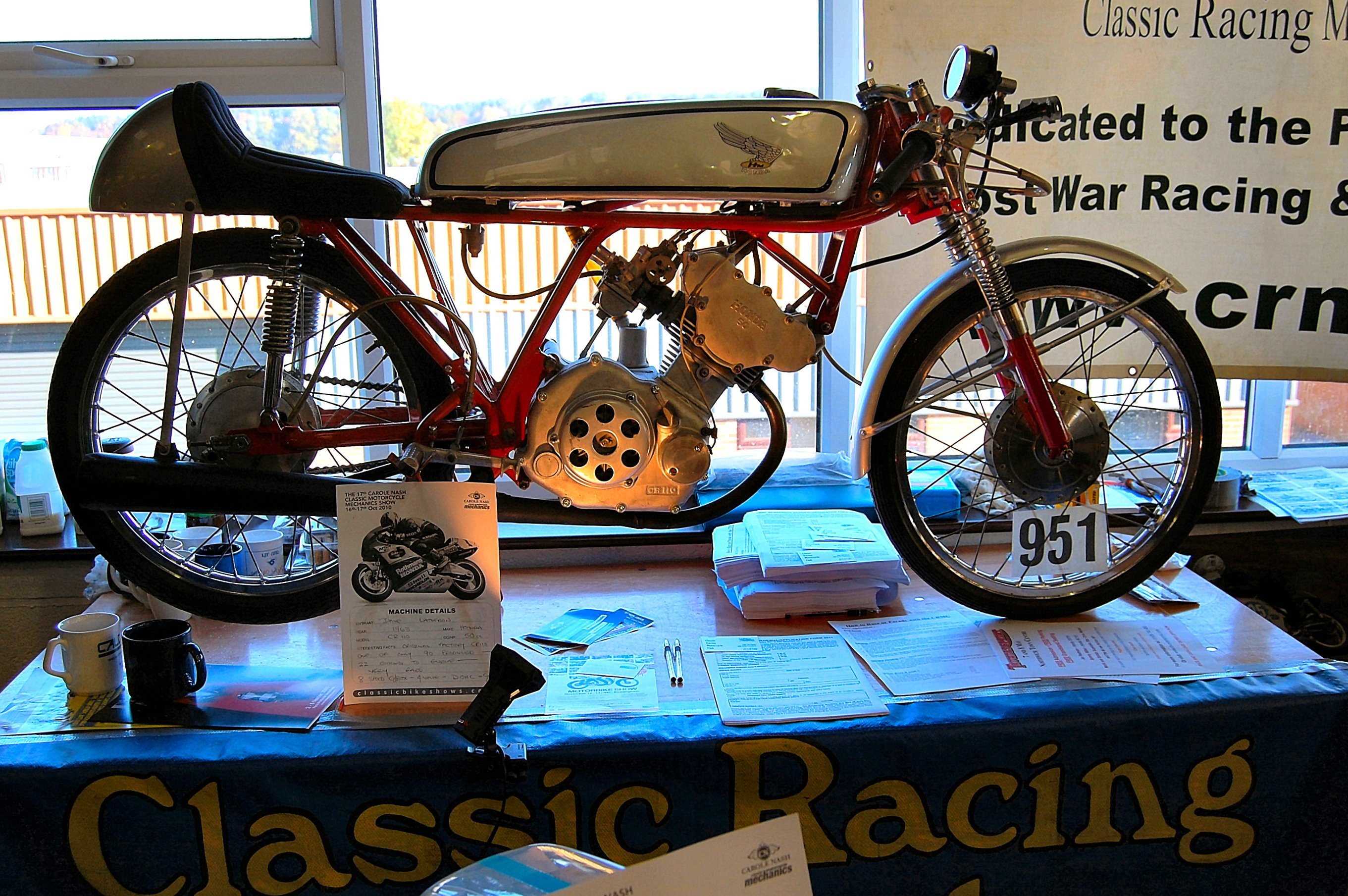
Honda CR110 at the 2010 Classic Motorcycle Mechanics Show

In contrast to the RC110, Honda developed a lower powered production version, the Honda CR110 Cub Racer. Aimed at the privateer rider for club and national status events, the CR110 proved more successful than the works machine and about 220 are said to have been sold worldwide. There were two versions, a five speed road machine with lights and silencers producing 7 hp at 12,700 rpm and the racing version with eight gears and 8.5 hp at 13,500 rpm.
