= 1962 French motorcycle Grand Prix =

(France) 1962 French Grand Prix
Race details
- Race 2 of 11 races in the 1962 Grand Prix motorcycle racing season
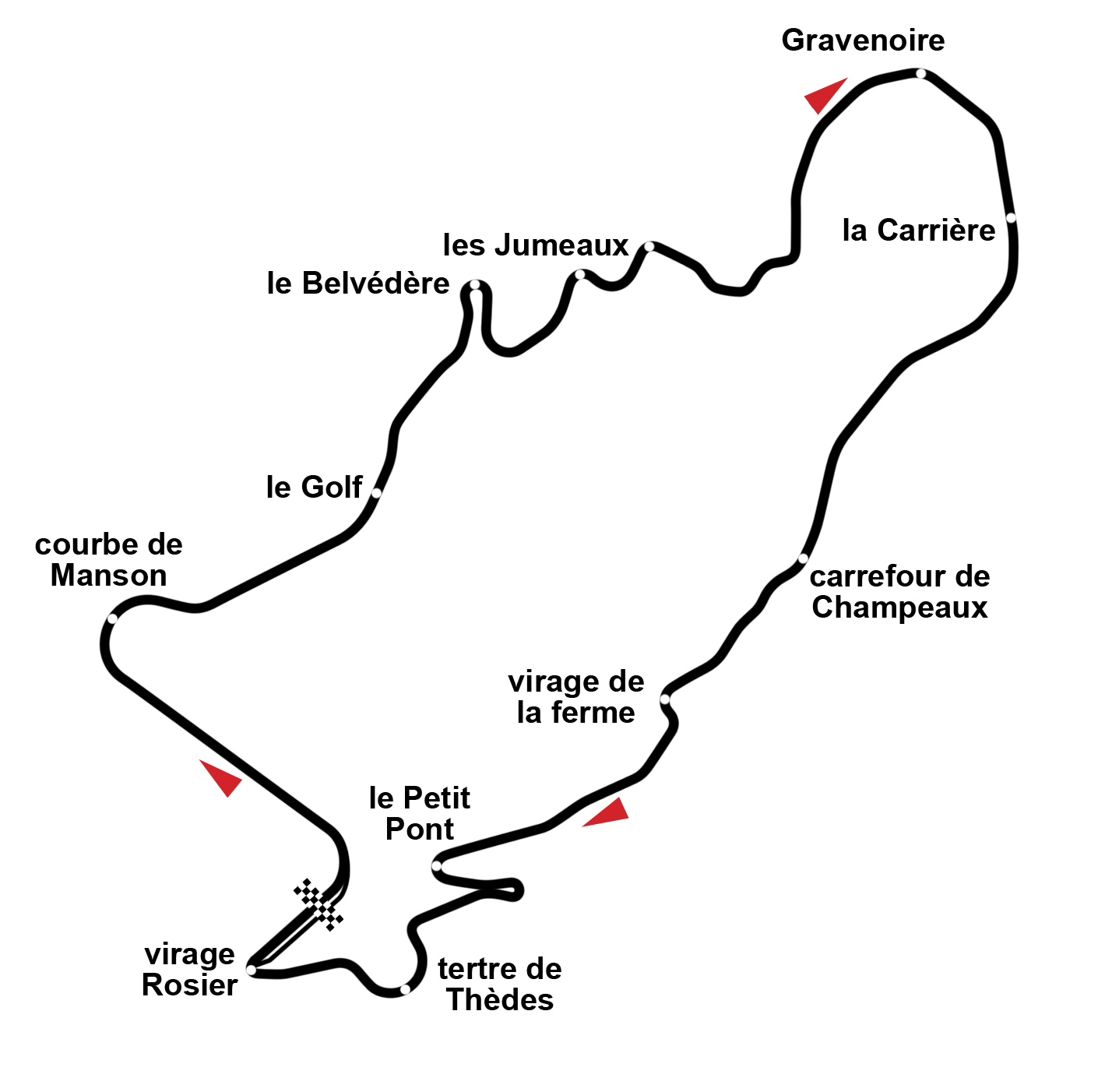
- Date: 13 May 1962
- Location: Charade Circuit
- Course: Permanent racing facility; 8.055 km (5.005 mi)

250cc
- Rider
Podium
First	(Federation of Rhodesia and Nyasaland) Jim Redman	Honda
Second	(United Kingdom) Bob McIntyre	Honda
Third	(Australia) Tom Phillis	Honda

125cc
- Rider
Podium
First	(Japan) Kunimitsu Takahashi	Honda
Second	(Federation of Rhodesia and Nyasaland) Jim Redman	Honda
Third	(United Kingdom) Tommy Robb	Honda

50cc
- Rider
Podium
First	(Netherlands) Jan Huberts	Kreidler
Second	(Japan) Kunimitsu Takahashi	Honda
Third	(Switzerland) Luigi Taveri	Honda

Sidecar (B2A)
- Rider
Podium
First	(Germany) Max Deubel	BMW
Second	(Switzerland) Florian Camathias	BMW
Third	(United Kingdom) Chris Vincent	BSA

The 1962 French motorcycle Grand Prix was a FIM event held on 13 May 1962 at Charade Circuit Clermont-Ferrand. It was part of the 1962 Grand Prix motorcycle racing season.

== 1962 French Grand Prix 50cc final standings ==
8 laps (64.44 kilometres (40.04 mi))

Place	Rider	Number	Country	Machine	Speed	Time	Points
1	(Netherlands) Jan Huberts		Netherlands	Kreidler	96.789 km/h (60.142 mph)	39:56.8	8
2	(Japan) Kunimitsu Takahashi		Japan	Honda RC110 / RC111	96.700 km/h (60.087 mph)	39:59.0	6
3	(Switzerland) Luigi Taveri		Switzerland	Honda RC110 / RC111	96.684 km/h (60.077 mph)	39:59.4	4
4	(United Kingdom) Tommy Robb		Britain	Honda RC110	96.563 km/h (60.001 mph)	40:02.4	3
5	(Japan) Seichi Suzuki		Japan	Suzuki	94.306 km/h (58.599 mph)	40:59.9	2
6	(Japan) Mitsuo Itoh		Japan	Suzuki	94.126 km/h (58.487 mph)	41:04.6	1

Number of finishers: 17

Fastest Lap Jan Huberts 4:48.0 = 100.552 km/h (62.480 mph)

== 1962 French Grand Prix 125cc final standings ==
13 laps (104.715 kilometres (65.067 mi))

Place	Rider	Number	Country	Machine	Speed	Time	Points
1	(Japan) Kunimitsu Takahashi		Japan	Honda RC145	108.276 km/h (67.280 mph)	58:01.6	8
2	Jim Redman		Rhodesia	Honda RC145	107.201 km/h (66.612 mph)	58:36.5	6
3	(United Kingdom) Tommy Robb		Britain	Honda RC145	107.016 km/h (66.497 mph)	58:42.6	4
4	(Switzerland) Luigi Taveri		Switzerland	Honda RC145	107.007 km/h (66.491 mph)	58:42.9	3
5	(Germany) Ernst Degner		Germany	Suzuki	101.984 km/h (63.370 mph)	1h.01:36.4	2
6	(Argentina) Jorge Kissling		Argentina	Bultaco	100.238 km/h (62.285 mph)	1h.02:40.8	1

Number of finishers: 12

Fastest Lap Kunimitsu Takahashi 4:12.8 = 114.707 km/h (71.276 mph)

== 1962 French Grand Prix 250cc final standings ==
16 laps (128.880 kilometres (80.082 mi))

Place	Rider	Number	Country	Machine	Speed	Time	Points
1	Jim Redman		Rhodesia	Honda RC162	115.659 km/h (71.867 mph)	1:06:51.5	8
2	(United Kingdom) Bob McIntyre		Britain	Honda RC162	115.651 km/h (71.862 mph)	1h.06:51.8	6
3	(Australia) Tom Phillis		Australia	Honda RC162	115.645 km/h (71.858 mph)	1h.06:52.0	4
4	(United Kingdom) Dan Shorey		Britain	Bultaco		+ 1 lap	3
5	(France) Jean-Pierre Beltoise		France	Moto Morini		+ 1 lap	2
6	(France) Benjamin Savoye		France	Mondial		+ 2 laps	1

Number of finishers: 6

Fastest Lap Tom Phillis 3:59.7 = 120.974 km/h (75.170 mph)

== 1962 French Grand Prix Side-car final standings ==
13 laps (104.715 kilometres (65.067 mi))

Place	Rider	Number	Country	Machine	Speed	Time	Points
1	(Germany) Max Deubel / (Germany) Emil Hörner		Germany	BMW	108.404 km/h (67.359 mph)	57:57.5	8
2	(Switzerland) Florian Camathias / (Germany) Horst Burkhardt		Switzerland	BMW	107.217 km/h (66.622 mph)	58:36.0	6
3	(United Kingdom) Chris Vincent / (United Kingdom) Eric Bliss		Britain	BSA	103.069 km/h (64.044 mph)	1h.00:57.5	4
4	(Germany) Otto Kölle / (Germany) Dieter Hess		Germany	BMW	103.069 km/h (64.044 mph)	1h.00:57.5	3
5	(Switzerland) Claude Lambert / (Switzerland) Alfred Herzig		Switzerland	BMW	100.5 km/h (62.4 mph)	1h.02:31.0	2
6	(United Kingdom) Eric Pickup / (United Kingdom) Keith Scott		Britain	BMW	100.459 km/h (62.422 mph)	1h.02:32.5	1

Number of finishers: 14

Fastest Lap Florian Camathias / Horst Burkhardt 4:19.0 = 111.961 km/h (69.569 mph)
