= 1962 Grand Prix motorcycle racing season =

Sports season

1962 F.I.M. Grand Prix motorcycle racing season

Seasons
- ← 1961 1963 →

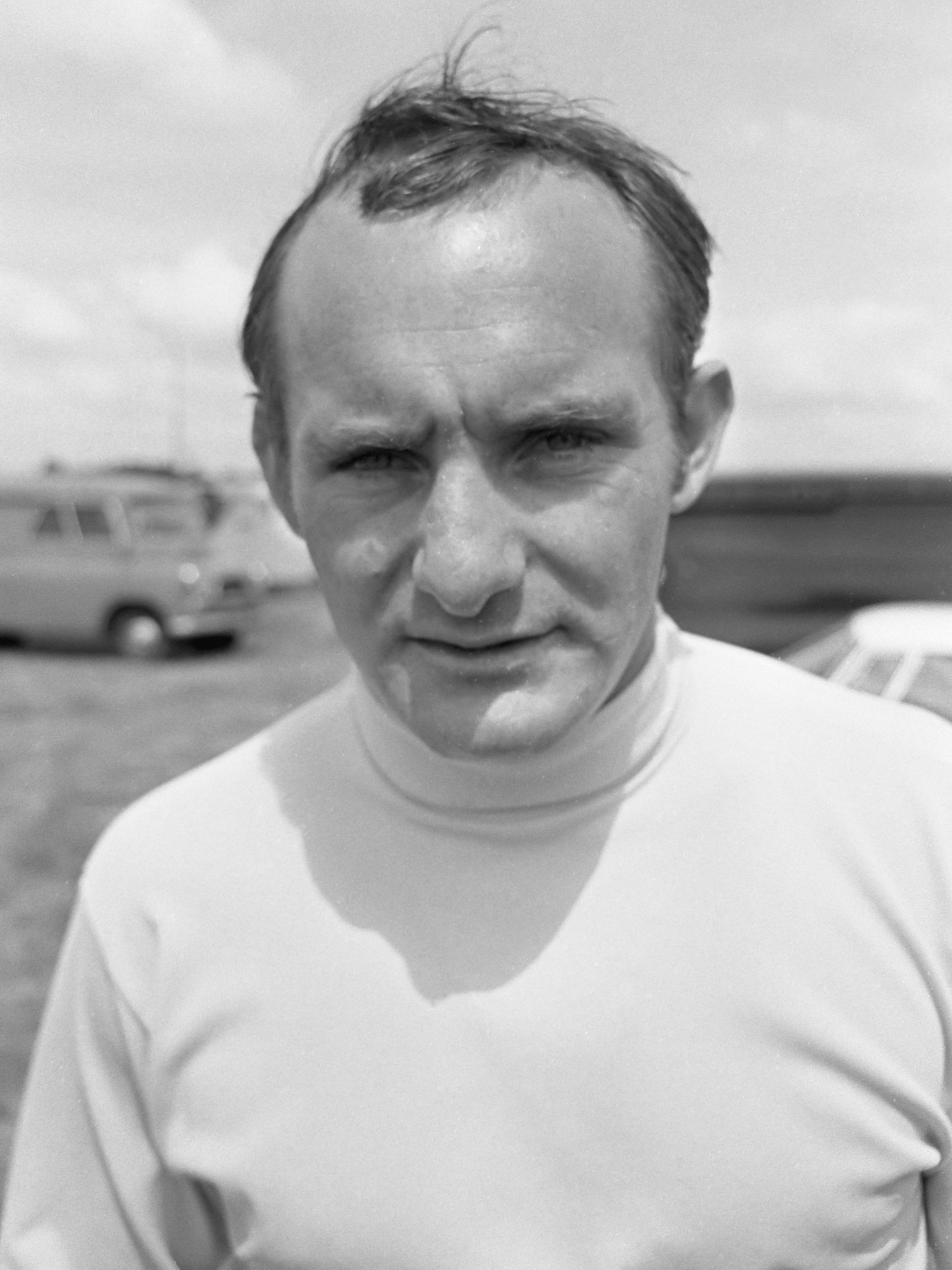
Mike Hailwood (pictured in 1967) won his first 500cc World Championship title in 1962.

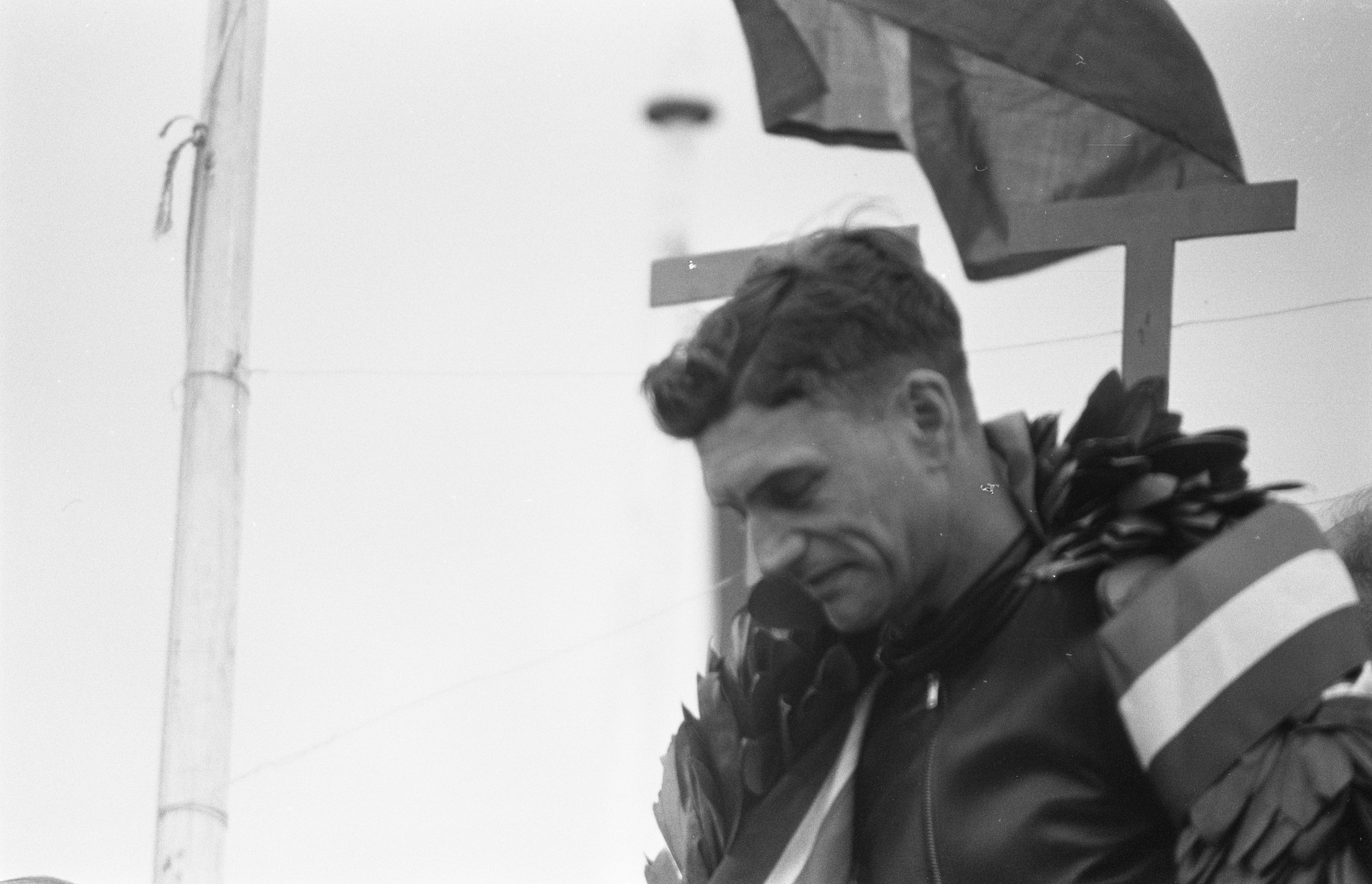
Jim Redman, the 1962 250cc and 350cc World Champion.

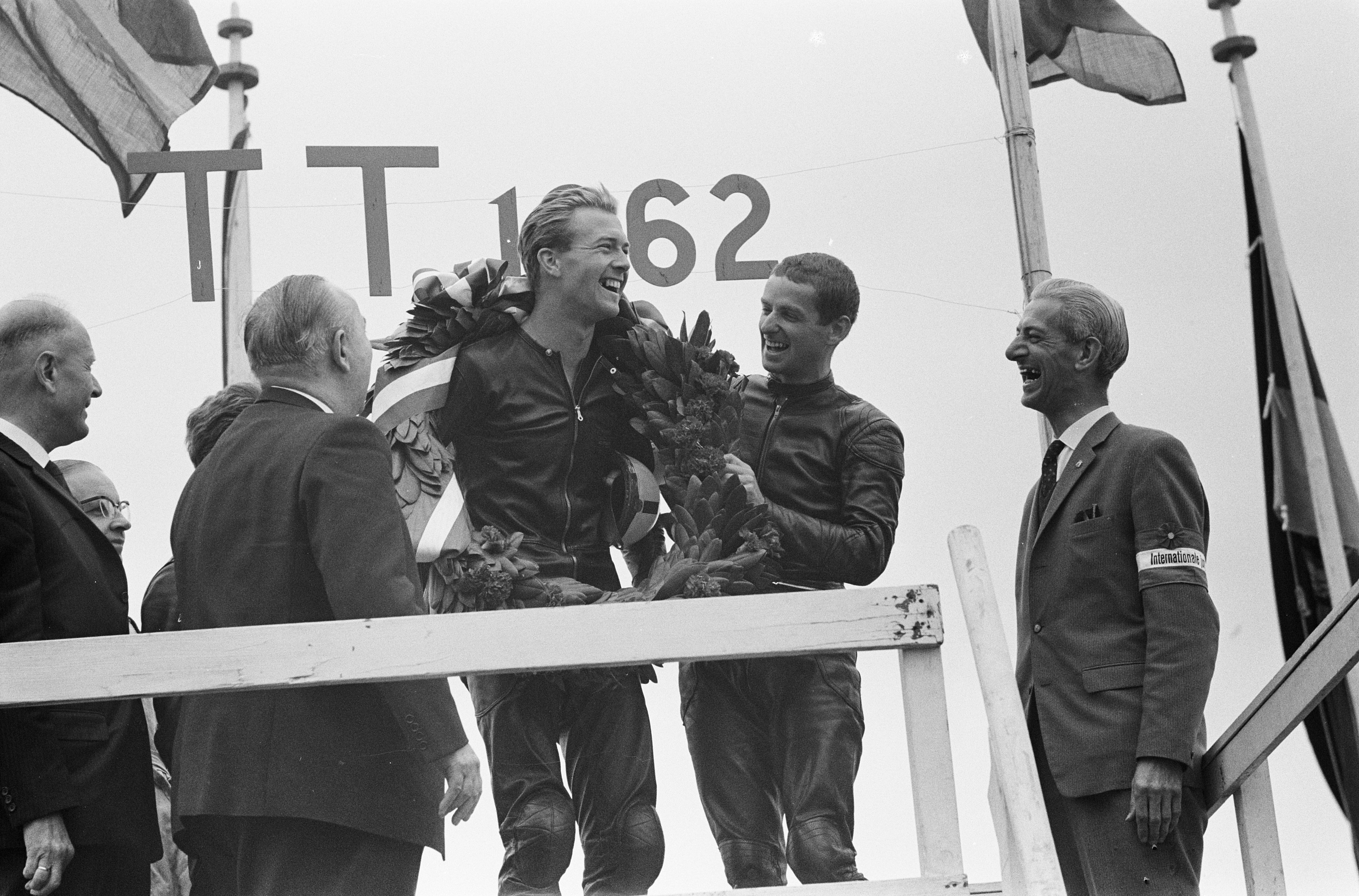
Ernst Degner (right), the inaugural 50cc World Champion.

The 1962 Grand Prix motorcycle racing season was the 14th F.I.M. Road Racing World Championship Grand Prix season. The season consisted of eleven Grand Prix races in six classes: 500cc, 350cc, 250cc, 125cc, 50cc and Sidecars 500cc. It began on 6 May, with Spanish Grand Prix and ended with Argentine Grand Prix on 14 October. Defending 350cc and 500cc world champion Gary Hocking was deeply affected by the death of his friend, Tom Phillis at the 1962 Isle of Man TT and, announced his retirement from motorcycle racing after winning the 1962 Senior TT. Hocking's MV Agusta teammate, Mike Hailwood went on to win his first 500cc world championship.

== 1962 Grand Prix season calendar ==
Round	Date	Grand Prix	Circuit	50cc winner	125cc winner	250cc winner	350cc winner	500cc winner	Sidecars 500cc winner	Report
1	6 May	(Spain) Spanish Grand Prix	Montjuïc	(West Germany) Hans-Georg Anscheidt	(Japan) Kunimitsu Takahashi	(Federation of Rhodesia and Nyasaland) Jim Redman			(West Germany) Deubel / Hörner	Report
2	13 May	(France) French Grand Prix	Charade	(Netherlands) Jan Huberts	(Japan) Kunimitsu Takahashi	(Federation of Rhodesia and Nyasaland) Jim Redman			(West Germany) Deubel / Hörner	Report
3	6 June	Isle of Man TT	Snaefell Mountain	(West Germany) Ernst Degner	(Switzerland) Luigi Taveri	(United Kingdom) Derek Minter	(United Kingdom) Mike Hailwood	(Federation of Rhodesia and Nyasaland) Gary Hocking	(United Kingdom) Vincent / Bliss	Report
4	30 June	(Netherlands) Dutch TT	Assen	(West Germany) Ernst Degner	(Switzerland) Luigi Taveri	(Federation of Rhodesia and Nyasaland) Jim Redman	(Federation of Rhodesia and Nyasaland) Jim Redman	(United Kingdom) Mike Hailwood	(Switzerland) (United Kingdom) Scheidegger / Robinson	Report
5	8 July	(Belgium) Belgian Grand Prix	Spa-Francorchamps	(West Germany) Ernst Degner	(Switzerland) Luigi Taveri	(Scotland) Bob McIntyre		(United Kingdom) Mike Hailwood	(Switzerland) (United Kingdom) Camathias / Winter	Report
6	15 July	(West Germany) West German Grand Prix	Solitude	(West Germany) Ernst Degner	(Switzerland) Luigi Taveri	(Federation of Rhodesia and Nyasaland) Jim Redman			(West Germany) Deubel / Hörner	Report
7	11 August	(Northern Ireland) Ulster Grand Prix	Dundrod		(Switzerland) Luigi Taveri	(Northern Ireland) Tommy Robb	(Federation of Rhodesia and Nyasaland) Jim Redman	(United Kingdom) Mike Hailwood		Report
8	19 August	(East Germany) East German Grand Prix	Sachsenring	(Netherlands) Jan Huberts	(Switzerland) Luigi Taveri	(Federation of Rhodesia and Nyasaland) Jim Redman	(Federation of Rhodesia and Nyasaland) Jim Redman	(United Kingdom) Mike Hailwood		Report
9	9 September	(Italy) Nations Grand Prix	Monza	(West Germany) Hans-Georg Anscheidt	(Japan) Teisuke Tanaka	(Federation of Rhodesia and Nyasaland) Jim Redman	(Federation of Rhodesia and Nyasaland) Jim Redman	(United Kingdom) Mike Hailwood		Report
10	23 September	(Finland) Finnish Grand Prix	Tampere	(Switzerland) Luigi Taveri	(Federation of Rhodesia and Nyasaland) Jim Redman		(Northern Ireland) Tommy Robb	(United Kingdom) Alan Shepherd		Report
11	14 October	(Argentina) Argentine Grand Prix	Buenos Aires	(New Zealand) Hugh Anderson	(New Zealand) Hugh Anderson	(United Kingdom) Arthur Wheeler		(Argentina) Benedicto Caldarella		Report

== Standings ==
=== Scoring system ===
Points were awarded to the top six finishers in each race. Only the best of six races were counted in 50cc, 125cc, 250cc championships, best of five in 350cc and 500cc championships, while in the Sidecars, the best of four races were counted.

Position	1st	2nd	3rd	4th	5th	6th
Points	8	6	4	3	2	1

==== 500cc final standings ====
Pos	Rider	Machine	MAN (Isle of Man)	HOL (Netherlands)	BEL (Belgium)	ULS (Northern Ireland)	DDR (East Germany)	NAC (Italy)	FIN (Finland)	ARG (Argentina)	Pts
1	(United Kingdom) Mike Hailwood	MV Agusta	12	1	1	1	1	1			**40**
2	(United Kingdom) Alan Shepherd	Matchless	Ret	4	2	2	2	9	1		**29**
3	(United Kingdom) Phil Read	Norton	Ret	3		3		4			**11**
4	(Austria) Bert Schneider	Norton	4	5	Ret	Ret	3	6		Ret	**10**
5	(Argentina) Benedicto Caldarella	Matchless								1	**8**
=	(Federation of Rhodesia and Nyasaland) Gary Hocking	MV Agusta	1								**8**
7	(Czechoslovakia) František Šťastný	Jawa		8		Ret	4	Ret	3		**7**
8	(United Kingdom) Tony Godfrey	Norton	Ret	6	3	5					**7**
9	(South Africa) Paddy Driver	Norton		10	4	Ret	5	5			**7**
10	(Sweden) Sven-Olof Gunnarsson	Norton	17						2		**6**
11	(United Kingdom) Derek Minter	Norton	Ret	2		Ret					**6**
12	(United Kingdom) Ellis Boyce	Norton / Matchless	2			Ret					**6**
13	(Argentina) Juan Carlos Salatino	Norton								2	**6**
=	(Italy) Remo Venturi	MV Agusta						2			**6**
15	(United Kingdom) Fred Stevens	Norton	3		6	Ret					**5**
16	(Italy) Silvio Grassetti	Bianchi		Ret				3			**4**
17	(Argentina) Eduardo Salatino	Norton								3	**4**
18	(United Kingdom) Ron Langston	Norton	Ret	Ret	Ret	4					**3**
19	(Chile) Pablo Gamberini	Matchless								4	**3**
=	(Finland) Anssi Resko	Matchless							4		**3**
21	(United Kingdom) Roy Ingram	Norton	5	9	Ret	8	7				**2**
22	(Australia) Jack Findlay	Norton	Ret	12	5	Ret	Ret	Ret			**2**
23	(Sweden) Harald Karlsson	Norton							5		**2**
=	(Argentina) Amleto Pomesano	Norton								5	**2**
25	(Germany) Roland Föll	Matchless	18		Ret		6	8	6		**2**
26	(United Kingdom) Brian Setchell	Norton	6								**1**
=	(Argentina) Manuel Soler	Norton								6	**1**
=	(United Kingdom) Ray Spence	Norton				6					**1**
29	(Australia) Jack Ahearn	Norton	Ret	7	8	12	Ret	10			**0**
30	(Switzerland) Gyula Marsovszky	Norton	23		9			7			**0**
31	(Germany) Rudolf Gläser	Norton			11				7		0
=	(Germany) Ernst Hiller	Matchless		11	7						0
=	(Northern Ireland) Tom Thorp	Norton	7			11					0
33	(United Kingdom) Peter Middleton	Norton	Ret			7					0
34	(Canada) Mike Duff	Matchless	Ret	Ret	Ret	Ret	8		Ret		**0**
35	(United Kingdom) Chris Conn	Norton	8								**0**
=	(Finland) Tauno Nurmi	Norton							8		**0**
37	(United Kingdom) Syd Mizen	Matchless	Ret	15		9					**0**
38	(Federation of Rhodesia and Nyasaland) William Van Leeuwen	Norton				Ret	9				**0**
39	(United Kingdom) Derek Powell	Matchless	9								**0**
=	(Finland) Antero Ventoniemi	Norton							9		**0**
41	(Belgium) Raymond Bogaerdt	Norton		16	10						**0**
42	(United Kingdom) Derek Woodman	Matchless	10			Ret					**0**
43	(Northern Ireland) Ralph Bryans	Norton				10					**0**
=	(Finland) Vijlo Heino	Norton							10		**0**
=	(Hungary) György Kurucz	Norton					10				**0**
46	(United Kingdom) Vernon Cottle	Norton		Ret			11				**0**
47	(Northern Ireland) Billy McCosh	Matchless	11								**0**
=	(Finland) Raine Lampinen	Norton							11		**0**
=	(Italy) Vasco Loro	Norton						11			**0**
50	(Italy) Renzo Rossi	Gilera						12			**0**
=	(United Kingdom) Graham Smith	Norton					12				**0**
52	(United Kingdom) Alf Shaw	Norton	28			13					**0**
53	(Sweden) Bo Granath	Norton				Ret	13				**0**
=	(Germany) Walter Scheimann	Norton	Ret	13							**0**
55	(United Kingdom) Peter Evans	Matchless	13								**0**
=	(Italy) Benedetto Zambotti	Norton						13			**0**
57	(Germany) Karl Recktenwald	Norton		14		14					**0**
58	(Republic of Ireland) George Purvis	Matchless	14			Ret					**0**
59	(Italy) Giuseppe Dardanello	Norton						14			**0**
=	(Austria) Alfred Worel	BSA					14				**0**
61	(Australia) Dennis Fry	Norton	27			15	Ret				**0**
62	(Italy) Emanuele Maugliani	Gilera						15			**0**
=	(United Kingdom) John Simmonds	Matchless	15								**0**
64	(United Kingdom) Brian Hornby	Norton	16								**0**
=	(Italy) Giuseppe Mantelli	Gilera						16			**0**
=	(Republic of Ireland) Patrick Plunkett	Matchless				16					**0**
67	(Austria) Ladislaus Richter	Norton		17			Ret				**0**
68	(Northern Ireland) Tommy Holmes	Matchless				17					**0**
69	(Northern Ireland) Jimmy Jones	Norton				18					**0**
70	(United Kingdom) Louis Carr	Matchless	19								**0**
71	(United Kingdom) Derek Lee	Matchless	20								**0**
72	(United Kingdom) Douglas Smith	AJS	21								**0**
73	(United Kingdom) George Bell	Norton	22								**0**
74	(United Kingdom) Chris Anderson	BSA / Norton	24			Ret					0
75	(United Kingdom) Jimmy Morton	Matchless	25			Ret					0
76	(United Kingdom) Ted Whiteside	Matchless	26								**0**
77	(United Kingdom) Frank Reynolds	Norton	29								**0**
-	(New Zealand) John Gabites	Norton	Ret			Ret	Ret				**0**
-	(France) Jacques Insermini	Norton			Ret	Ret	Ret	Ret			**0**
-	(New Zealand) Hugh Anderson	Matchless	Ret			Ret					**0**
-	(United Kingdom) Bob Coulter	AJS / Norton				Ret	Ret				0
-	(United Kingdom) Robin Fitton	Norton		Ret		Ret					0
-	(United Kingdom) Harry Grant	BSA	Ret			Ret					0
-	(Scotland) Alistair King	Matchless	Ret			Ret					**0**
-	(United Kingdom) Stephen Murray	Matchless		Ret		Ret					**0**
-	(United Kingdom) Dan Shorey	Norton	Ret			Ret					**0**
-	(Netherlands) Joop Vogelzang	Norton		Ret			Ret				**0**
-	(United Kingdom) Arthur Wheeler	Moto Guzzi	Ret							Ret	**0**
-	(Sweden) Billy Andersson	AJS	Ret								**0**
-	(Austria) Rudolf Bergsleithner	Norton	Ret								**0**
-	(Italy) Ernesto Brambilla	Bianchi		Ret							**0**
-	(Northern Ireland) John Brown	Norton				Ret					**0**
-	(United Kingdom) Jack Bullock	Norton	Ret								**0**
-	(Sweden) Agne Carlsson	Norton							Ret		**0**
-	(Federation of Rhodesia and Nyasaland) Graham Chatterton	Norton	Ret								**0**
-	(Uruguay) Horacio Costas	Matchless								Ret	**0**
-	(Northern Ireland) Dick Creith	Norton				Ret					**0**
-	(United Kingdom) James Cripps	Norton	Ret								**0**
-	(Australia) Terry Dennehy	Norton				Ret					**0**
-	(United Kingdom) Alan Dugalde	Matchless	Ret								**0**
-	(United Kingdom) Don Ellis	Matchless	Ret								**0**
-	(United Kingdom) Jack Gow	Triumph	Ret								**0**
-	(Czechoslovakia) Gustav Havel	Jawa				Ret					**0**
-	(Germany) Karl Hoppe	Norton		Ret							**0**
-	(Finland) Hannu Kuparinen	Norton							Ret		**0**
-	(Northern Ireland) Len Ireland	Norton				Ret					**0**
-	(Finland) Pentti Lehtelä	Norton							Ret		**0**
-	(Austria) Edy Lenz	Norton					Ret				**0**
-	(Federation of Rhodesia and Nyasaland) Colin Lyster	Norton				Ret					**0**
-	(Argentina) Jorge Kissling	Matchless								Ret	**0**
-	(Northern Ireland) Mark McCausland	Matchless				Ret					**0**
-	(Northern Ireland) Robert McCracken	Norton				Ret					**0**
-	(United Kingdom) Michael McStay	Norton	Ret								**0**
-	(United Kingdom) Ned Minihan	Norton	Ret								**0**
-	(France) Albert Montagne	Norton					Ret				**0**
-	(United Kingdom) Billie Nelson	Norton	Ret								**0**
-	(United Kingdom) Eric Oliver	AJS				Ret					**0**
-	(Argentina) Juan Carlos Perkins	Norton								Ret	**0**
-	(Sweden) Morgan Radberg	Norton				Ret					**0**
-	(United Kingdom) Johnny Rae	Norton	Ret								**0**
-	(United Kingdom) Harold Riley	BSA	Ret								**0**
-	(United Kingdom) Bill Robertson	AJS	Ret								**0**
-	(United Kingdom) Frank Rutherford	Matchless	Ret								**0**
-	(Northern Ireland) Jack Shannon	Matchless				Ret					**0**
-	(United Kingdom) Bill Smith	Matchless						Ret			**0**
-	(Switzerland) Werner Spinnler	Norton					Ret				**0**
-	(Denmark) Vagn Stevnhoved	Norton					Ret				**0**
-	(Finland) Veikko Sulasaari	Norton							Ret		**0**
-	(United Kingdom) Brian Taggart	AJS				Ret					**0**
-	(Austria) Rudi Thalhammer	Norton						Ret			**0**
-	(United Kingdom) Pete Tomlinson	Norton	Ret								**0**
-	(Netherlands) Martinus Van Son	Norton					Ret				**0**
-	(Argentina) Raûl Villaveiran	Norton								Ret	**0**
-	(Canada) Dave Wildman	Matchless	Ret								**0**
Pos	Rider	Bike	MAN (United Kingdom)	HOL (Netherlands)	BEL (Belgium)	ULS (Ulster)	DDR (East Germany)	NAC (Italy)	FIN (Finland)	ARG (Argentina)	Pts

Colour	Result
Gold	Winner
Silver	Second place
Bronze	Third place
Green	Points classification
Blue	Non-points classification
Blue	Non-classified finish (NC)
Purple	Retired, not classified (Ret)
Red	Did not qualify (DNQ)
Red	Did not pre-qualify (DNPQ)
Black	Disqualified (DSQ)
White	Did not start (DNS)
White	Withdrew (WD)
White	Race cancelled (C)
Blank	Did not practice (DNP)
Blank	Did not arrive (DNA)
Blank	Excluded (EX)

**Bold** – Pole
Italics – Fastest Lap

=== 350cc standings ===
Place	Rider	Number	Country	Machine	Points	Wins
1	(Federation of Rhodesia and Nyasaland) Jim Redman		Rhodesia	Honda	32	4
2	(United Kingdom) Tommy Robb		United Kingdom	Honda	22	1
3	(United Kingdom) Mike Hailwood		United Kingdom	MV Agusta	20	1
4	(Czechoslovakia) František Šťastný		Czechoslovakia	Jawa	16	0
5	(Italy) Silvio Grassetti		Italy	Bianchi	8	0
6	(United Kingdom) Alan Shepherd		United Kingdom	AJS / MZ	7	0
7	(Czechoslovakia) Gustav Havel		Czechoslovakia	Jawa	7	0
8	(Federation of Rhodesia and Nyasaland) Gary Hocking		Rhodesia	MV Agusta	6	0
9	(Canada) Mike Duff		Canada	AJS	5	0
10	(United Kingdom) Roy Ingram		United Kingdom	Norton	3	0
=	(Sweden) Sven-Olof Gunnarsson		Sweden	Norton	3	0
12	(United Kingdom) Derek Minter		United Kingdom	Norton	2	0
=	(Finland) Taneli Lepo		Finland	AJS	2	0
14	(New Zealand) Hugh Anderson		New Zealand	AJS	1	0
=	(United Kingdom) Phil Read		United Kingdom	Norton	1	0
=	(Soviet Union) Nicolaï Sevostianov		USSR	CKEB C360	1	0
=	(United Kingdom) Arthur Wheeler		United Kingdom	Moto Guzzi	1	0
=	(Japan) Moto Kitano		Japan	Honda	1	0

=== 250cc standings ===
Place	Rider	Number	Country	Machine	Points	Wins
1	(Federation of Rhodesia and Nyasaland) Jim Redman		Rhodesia	Honda	48	6
2	(United Kingdom) Bob McIntyre		United Kingdom	Honda	32	1
3	(United Kingdom) Arthur Wheeler		United Kingdom	Moto Guzzi	19	1
4	(Australia) Tom Phillis		Australia	Honda	12	0
5	(Italy) Tarquinio Provini		Italy	Morini	10	0
6	(United Kingdom) Derek Minter		United Kingdom	Honda	8	1
=	(United Kingdom) Tommy Robb		United Kingdom	Honda	8	1
8	(Switzerland) Luigi Taveri		Switzerland	Honda	8	0
9	(Italy) Alberto Pagani		Italy	Aermacchi	8	0
10	(United Kingdom) Dan Shorey		United Kingdom	Bultaco	8	0
11	(United Kingdom) Mike Hailwood		United Kingdom	MZ	6	0
=	(Italy) Umberto Masetti		Italy	Morini	6	0
13	(West Germany) Günter Beer		West Germany	Adler	6	0
=	(Japan) Moto Kitano		Japan	Honda	6	0
15	(Japan) Teisuke Tanaka		Japan	Honda	4	0
=	(East Germany) Werner Musiol		East Germany	MZ	4	0
=	(Argentina) Rudolph Kaiser		Argentina	NSU	4	0
18	(Netherlands) Cas Swart		Netherlands	Honda	3	0
=	(Argentina) Jorge Ternengo		Argentina	Ducati	3	0
20	(France) Jean-Pierre Beltoise		France	Morini	2	0
=	(United Kingdom) Frank Perris		United Kingdom	Suzuki	2	0
=	(United Kingdom) Campbell Donaghy		United Kingdom	Ducati	2	0
=	(Soviet Union) Nicolaï Sevostianov		USSR	CKEB C259	2	0
=	(Italy) Gilberto Milani		Italy	Aermacchi	2	0
=	(Uruguay) Carlos Marfetan		Uruguay	Parilla	2	0
26	(Belgium) Marcel Toussaint		Belgium	Benelli	1	0
=	(France) Benjamin Savoye		France	FB-Mondial	1	0
=	(Belgium) Pierrot Vervroegen		Belgium	Aermacchi	1	0
=	(West Germany) Michael Schneider		West Germany	NSU	1	0
=	(United Kingdom) Stuart Graham		United Kingdom	Aermacchi	1	0
=	(Italy) Paolo Campanelli		Italy	Benelli	1	0
=	(Argentina) Enrique Dietrich		Argentina	Aermacchi	1	0

=== 125cc ===
==== Riders' standings ====
Pos.	Rider	Bike	ESP (Spain)	FRA (France)	MAN (Isle of Man)	NED (Netherlands)	BEL (Belgium)	FRG (West Germany)	ULS (Northern Ireland)	GDR (East Germany)	NAT (Italy)	FIN (Finland)	ARG (Argentina)	Pts
1	(Switzerland) Luigi Taveri	Honda	3**^{F}**	4	1**^{F}**	1**^{F}**	1**^{F}**	1**^{F}**	1	1**^{F}**	2**^{F}**	2		48 (67)
2	(Federation of Rhodesia and Nyasaland) Jim Redman	Honda	2	2	5	2	2		3	2	4	1		38 (47)
3	(United Kingdom) Tommy Robb	Honda		3	2	3		2	2**^{F}**	4	3			30 (33)
4	(Japan) Kunimitsu Takahashi	Honda	1	1**^{F}**										16
5	(United Kingdom) Mike Hailwood	EMC	4			5	4	3						12
6	(Japan) Teisuke Tanaka	Honda							4		1			11
7	(New Zealand) Hugh Anderson	Suzuki						6	5				1**^{F}**	11
8	(East Germany) Hans Fischer	MZ								3		4		7
9	(Argentina) Raúl Kissling	DKW											2	6
10	(South Africa) Paddy Driver	EMC					3		6		6			6
11	(West Germany) Ernst Degner	Suzuki		5		4								5
12	(United Kingdom) Rex Avery	EMC	5		6		5							5
13	(Australia) Tom Phillis	Honda			3									4
13	(United Kingdom) Alan Shepherd	MZ										3**^{F}**		4
13	(Japan) Mitsuo Itoh	Suzuki											3	4
16	(United Kingdom) Derek Minter	Honda			4									3
16	(United Kingdom) Bob McIntyre	Honda						4						3
16	(Argentina) Limburg Moreira	Honda											4	3
19	(Gibraltar) John Grace	Bultaco						5						2
19	(East Germany) Klaus Enderlein	MZ								5				2
19	(Italy) Alberto Pagani	Honda									5			2
19	(United Kingdom) Frank Perris	Suzuki										5		2
19	(Argentina) Marzillo Chizzini	Bultaco											5	2
24	(Italy) Francesco Villa	Mondial	6											1
24	(Argentina) Jorge Kissling	Bultaco		6										1
24	(Czechoslovakia) Stanislav Malina	ČZ				6								1
24	(Italy) Giuseppe Visenzi	Ducati					6							1
24	(East Germany) Werner Musiol	MZ								6				1
24	(Finland) Jukka Petäjä	MZ										6		1
24	(Argentina) Pedro Rosenthal	Tohatsu											6	1
Pos.	Rider	Bike	ESP (Spain)	FRA (France)	MAN (Isle of Man)	NED (Netherlands)	BEL (Belgium)	FRG (West Germany)	ULS (Northern Ireland)	GDR (East Germany)	NAT (Italy)	FIN (Finland)	ARG (Argentina)	Pts

Race key
Colour	Result
Gold	Winner
Silver	2nd place
Bronze	3rd place
Green	Points finish
Blue	Non-points finish
Blue	Non-classified finish (NC)
Purple	Retired (Ret)
Red	Did not qualify (DNQ)
Black	Disqualified (DSQ)
White	Did not start (DNS)
White	Withdrew (WD)
White	Race cancelled (C)
Blank	Did not practice (DNP)
Blank	Excluded (EX)
Blank	Did not arrive (DNA)
Blank	Did not enter (empty cell)
Annotation	Meaning
P	Pole position
F	Fastest lap
Rider key
Colour	Meaning
Light blue	Rookie rider

==== Constructors' standings ====
Each constructor is awarded the same number of points as their best placed rider in each race.

Pos.	Constructor	ESP (Spain)	FRA (France)	MAN (Isle of Man)	NED (Netherlands)	BEL (Belgium)	FRG (West Germany)	ULS (Northern Ireland)	GDR (East Germany)	NAT (Italy)	FIN (Finland)	ARG (Argentina)	Pts
1	(Japan) Honda	1	1	1	1	1	1	1	1	1	1		48 (80)
2	(Japan) Suzuki		5		4		6	5			5	1	18
3	(United Kingdom) EMC	4		6	5	3	3	6		6			15 (16)
4	(East Germany) MZ								3		3		8
5	(West Germany) DKW											2	6
6	(Spain) Bultaco		6				5					4	6
7	(Italy) Mondial	6											1
7	(Czechoslovakia) ČZ				6								1
7	(Italy) Ducati					6							1
7	(Japan) Tohatsu											6	1
Pos.	Constructor	ESP (Spain)	FRA (France)	MAN (Isle of Man)	NED (Netherlands)	BEL (Belgium)	FRG (West Germany)	ULS (Northern Ireland)	GDR (East Germany)	NAT (Italy)	FIN (Finland)	ARG (Argentina)	Pts

=== 50cc standings ===
Place	Rider	Number	Country	Machine	Points	Wins
1	(West Germany) Ernst Degner		West Germany	Suzuki	41	4
2	(West Germany) Hans-Georg Anscheidt		West Germany	Kreidler	36	2
3	(Switzerland) Luigi Taveri		Switzerland	Honda	29	1
4	(Netherlands) Jan Huberts		Netherlands	Kreidler	29	2
5	(Japan) Mitsuo Itoh		Japan	Suzuki	23	0
6	(United Kingdom) Tommy Robb		United Kingdom	Honda	17	0
7	(New Zealand) Hugh Anderson		New Zealand	Suzuki	16	1
8	(Japan) Seiichi Suzuki		Japan	Suzuki	10	0
9	(Japan) Kunimitsu Takahashi		Japan	Honda	7	0
10	(Spain) José Busquets		Spain	Derbi	6	0
11	(West Germany) Wolfgang Gedlich		West Germany	Kreidler	6	0
12	(Japan) Isao Morishita		Japan	Suzuki	2	0
=	(Japan) Teisuke Tanaka		Japan	Honda	2	0
14	(Japan) Michio Ichino		Japan	Suzuki	2	0
15	(United Kingdom) Dan Shorey		United Kingdom	Kreidler	1	0
=	(West Germany) Günter Beer		West Germany	Kreidler	1	0
