= 1962 Spanish motorcycle Grand Prix =

(Spain) 1962 Spanish Grand Prix
Race details
- Race 1 of 11 races in the 1962 Grand Prix motorcycle racing season
- Date: 6 May 1962
- Location: Montjuïc Park
- Course: Permanent racing facility; 3.791 km (2.356 mi)

250cc
- Rider
Podium
| First | (Federation of Rhodesia and Nyasaland) Jim Redman | Honda |
| Second | (United Kingdom) Bob McIntyre | Honda |
| Third | (Australia) Tom Phillis | Honda |

125cc
- Rider
Podium
| First | (Japan) Kunimitsu Takahashi | Honda |
| Second | (Federation of Rhodesia and Nyasaland) Jim Redman | Honda |
| Third | (Switzerland) Luigi Taveri | Honda |

50cc
- Rider
Podium
| First | (Germany) Hans-Georg Anscheidt | Kreidler |
| Second | (Spain) José Busquets | Derbi |
| Third | (Switzerland) Luigi Taveri | Honda |

Sidecar (B2A)
- Rider
Podium
| First | (Germany) Max Deubel | BMW |
| Second | (Switzerland) Florian Camathias | BMW |
| Third | (Germany) Otto Kölle | BMW |

The 1962 Spanish motorcycle Grand Prix was a FIM event held on 6 May 1962 at Montjuïc circuit. It was the first round of the 1962 Grand Prix motorcycle racing season and the 100th World Championship Grand Prix held since the championship began in 1949.

== 1962 Spanish Grand Prix 50cc final standings ==
12 laps (45.487 kilometres (28.264 mi))

| Place | Rider | Number | Country | Machine | Speed | Time | Points |
|---|---|---|---|---|---|---|---|
| 1 | (Germany) Hans-Georg Anscheidt | | Germany | Kreidler | 97.448 km/h (60.551 mph) | 28:00.41 | 8 |
| 2 | (Spain) José Busquets | | Spain | Derbi | 97.362 km/h (60.498 mph) | 28:01.90 | 6 |
| 3 | (Switzerland) Luigi Taveri | | Switzerland | Honda RC110 / RC111 | 96.561 km/h (60.000 mph) | 28:15.86 | 4 |
| 4 | (Germany) Wolfgang Gedlich | | Germany | Kreidler | 95.974 km/h (59.635 mph) | 28:26.23 | 3 |
| 5 | (United Kingdom) Tommy Robb | | Britain | Honda RC110 | 95.379 km/h (59.266 mph) | 28:36.86 | 2 |
| 6 | (Japan) Kunimitsu Takahashi | | Japan | Honda RC110 / RC111 | 95.373 km/h (59.262 mph) | 28:36.97 | 1 |

Number of finishers: 14

Fastest Lap Hans-Georg Anscheidt 2:15.83 = 100.547 km/h (62.477 mph)

== 1962 Spanish Grand Prix 125cc final standings ==
27 laps (102.347 kilometres (63.595 mi))

| Place | Rider | Number | Country | Machine | Speed | Time | Points |
|---|---|---|---|---|---|---|---|
| 1 | (Japan) Kunimitsu Takahashi | | Japan | Honda RC145 | 109.459 km/h (68.015 mph) | 56:06.08 | 8 |
| 2 | Jim Redman | | Rhodesia | Honda RC145 | 109.450 km/h (68.009 mph) | 56:06.36 | 6 |
| 3 | (Switzerland) Luigi Taveri | | Switzerland | Honda RC145 | 109.447 km/h (68.007 mph) | 56:06.45 | 4 |
| 4 | (United Kingdom) Mike Hailwood | | Britain | EMC | 108.090 km/h (67.164 mph) | 56:48.72 | 3 |
| 5 | (United Kingdom) Rex Avery | | Britain | EMC | 101.984 km/h (63.370 mph) | 57:29.15 | 2 |
| 6 | (Italy) Francesco Villa | | Italy | Mondial | | + 1 lap | 1 |

Number of finishers: 10

Fastest Lap Luigi Taveri 2:01.68 = 112.316 km/h (69.790 mph)

== 1962 Spanish Grand Prix 250cc final standings ==
33 laps (125.070 kilometres (77.715 mi))

| Place | Rider | Number | Country | Machine | Speed | Time | Points |
|---|---|---|---|---|---|---|---|
| 1 | Jim Redman | | Rhodesia | Honda RC162 | 114.622 km/h (71.223 mph) | 1h:05:28.16 | 8 |
| 2 | (United Kingdom) Bob McIntyre | | Britain | Honda RC162 | 114.299 km/h (71.022 mph) | 1h.05:39.25 | 6 |
| 3 | (Australia) Tom Phillis | | Australia | Honda RC162 | 114.283 km/h (71.012 mph) | 1h.05:39.81 | 4 |
| 4 | (United Kingdom) Dan Shorey | | Britain | Bultaco | | + 2 laps | 3 |
| 5 | (Italy) Alberto Pagani | | Italy | Aermacchi | | + 3 laps | 2 |
| 6 | (Belgium) Marcel Toussaint | | Belgium | Benelli | | + 7 laps | 1 |

Number of finishers: 7

Fastest Lap Tom Phillis 1:57.8 = 116.564 km/h (72.430 mph)

== 1962 Spanish Grand Prix Side-car final standings ==
27 laps (102.347 kilometres (63.595 mi))

| Place | Rider | Number | Country | Machine | Speed | Time | Points |
|---|---|---|---|---|---|---|---|
| 1 | (Germany) Max Deubel / (Germany) Emil Hörner | | Germany | BMW | 110.053 km/h (68.384 mph) | 55:47.92 | 8 |
| 2 | (Switzerland) Florian Camathias / (Germany) Horst Burkhardt | | Switzerland | BMW | 105.932 km/h (65.823 mph) | 57:58.18 | 6 |
| 3 | (Germany) Otto Kölle / (Germany) Dieter Hess | | Germany | BMW | 104.244 km/h (64.774 mph) | 58:54.49 | 4 |
| 4 | (Germany) Arsenius Butscher / (Germany) Heinrich Vester | | Germany | BMW | | + 1 lap | 3 |
| 5 | (United Kingdom) Harold Scholes / (United Kingdom) Ray Lindsay | | Britain | BMW | | + 1 lap | 2 |
| 6 | (United Kingdom) Chris Vincent / (United Kingdom) Eric Bliss | | Britain | BSA | | + 1 lap | 1 |

Number of finishers: 8

Fastest Lap Max Deubel / Emil Hörner 2:03.82 = 110.207 km/h (68.479 mph)
