= Honda Cub =

Honda Cub may refer to:

- The Honda Cub F, a 1952–1954 motorized bicycle.
- The Honda Super Cub, a motorcycle made since 1958.
- The Honda CR110 or Cub Racer, a privateer version of the RC110 Grand Prix racing motorcycle, made in 1961
