= Pyynikki Circuit =

Defunct Finnish motorsport race track

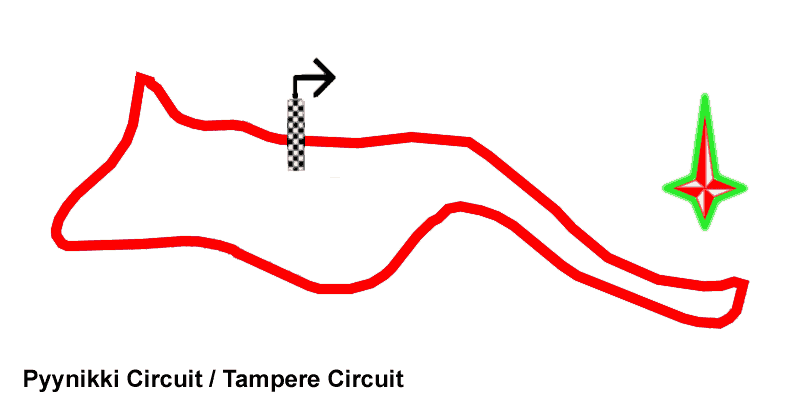
- Grand Prix Circuit (1932–1939, 1946–1971)
- Location: Tampere, Finland
- Coordinates: 61°29′40″N 23°43′47″E
- Opened: 1932 (re-opened 1946)
- Closed: 1971 (firstly closed 1939)
- Major events: Grand Prix motorcycle racing Finnish motorcycle Grand Prix (1962–1963)

Grand Prix Circuit (1932–1939, 1946–1971)
- Length: 3.608 km (2.242 mi)
- Turns: 11
- Race lap record: 1:40.300 ( (United Kingdom) Mike Hailwood, MV Agusta 500 4C, 1963, 500cc)

The Pyynikki Circuit or Tampere Circuit is a former motorsport street circuit in Tampere, Finland. The circuit was a 3.608 km (2.242 mi) long clockwise circuit on public roads through forests and a small Finnish town in the district of Pyynikki. The roadraces were known as "Pyynikinajot" and were first run from 1932–1939. After an interruption caused by the Second World War they were revived in 1946, running until 1971.

For the 1962 and 1963 seasons the Finnish Motorcycle Grand Prix, a round of the Grand Prix motorcycle racing world championship, was held on the Pyynikki Circuit. The circuit was found to be too narrow, and therefore the Finnish Grand Prix was moved to the Imatra Circuit from 1964.

Races on the Pyynikki Circuit were banned in 1971 for safety reasons, but in the final year the future World Champion Jarno Saarinen won two classes.

== World Championship Results 1962 and 1963 ==
Year	Class	1st	2nd	3rd	Fastest Lap
1962	50cc	(Switzerland) Luigi Taveri (Honda)	(Northern Ireland) Tommy Robb (Honda)	(West Germany) Hans-Georg Anscheidt (Kreidler)	(Switzerland) Luigi Taveri (Honda)
1962	125cc	(Federation of Rhodesia and Nyasaland) Jim Redman (Honda)	(Switzerland) Luigi Taveri (Honda)	(United Kingdom) Alan Shepherd (MZ)	(United Kingdom) Alan Shepherd (MZ)
1962	350cc	(Northern Ireland) Tommy Robb (Honda)	(Federation of Rhodesia and Nyasaland) Jim Redman (Honda)	(United Kingdom) Alan Shepherd (MZ)	(Northern Ireland) Tommy Robb (Honda)
1962	500cc	(United Kingdom) Alan Shepherd (Matchless)	(Sweden) Sven-Olof Gunnarsson (Norton)	(Czechoslovakia) František Šťastný (Jawa)	(United Kingdom) Alan Shepherd (Matchless)
1963	50cc	(West Germany) Hans-Georg Anscheidt (Kreidler)	(Japan) Mitsuo Itō (Suzuki)	(New Zealand) Hugh Anderson (Suzuki)	(New Zealand) Hugh Anderson (Suzuki)
1963	125cc	(New Zealand) Hugh Anderson (Suzuki)	(Switzerland) Luigi Taveri (Honda)	(United Kingdom) Alan Shepherd (MZ)	(New Zealand) Hugh Anderson (Suzuki)
1963	350cc	(United Kingdom) Mike Hailwood (MV Agusta)	(Federation of Rhodesia and Nyasaland) Jim Redman (Honda)	(Sweden) Sven-Olof Gunnarsson (Norton)	(United Kingdom) Mike Hailwood (MV Agusta)
1963	500cc	(United Kingdom) Mike Hailwood (MV Agusta)	(United Kingdom) Alan Shepherd (Matchless)	(Canada) Mike Duff (Matchless)	(United Kingdom) Mike Hailwood (MV Agusta)

== Lap records ==
The fastest official race lap records at the Pyynikki Circuit are listed as:

Category	Time	Driver	Vehicle	Event
Grand Prix Circuit (1932–1939, 1946–1971): 3.608 km (2.242 mi)
500cc	1:40.300	Mike Hailwood	MV Agusta 500 4C	1963 Finnish motorcycle Grand Prix
350cc	1:47.300	Mike Hailwood	MV Agusta 350 4C	1963 Finnish motorcycle Grand Prix
125cc	1:58.200	Alan Shepherd	MZ ES 125	1962 Finnish motorcycle Grand Prix
