= Tom Phillis =

Australian motorcycle racer (1934–1962)

- Phillis early in his career circa 1955 on his BSA Gold Star in Clubman's racing trim
- Nationality: Australian
- Born: 9 April 1934; Sydney, Australia
- Died: 6 June 1962 (aged 28); Isle of Man
Motorcycle racing career statistics
Grand Prix motorcycle racing
Active years	1958 – 1962
First race	1958 350cc Isle of Man TT
Last race	1962 350cc Isle of Man TT
First win	1961 125cc Spanish Grand Prix
Last win	1961 250cc Argentine Grand Prix
Team	Honda
Championships	125cc – 1961
Starts / Wins / Podiums / Poles / F. laps / Points; 35 / 6 / 20 / N/A / 9 / 114

Thomas Edward Phillis (9 April 1934 – 6 June 1962) was an Australian professional Grand Prix motorcycle road racer. He won the 1961 125cc motorcycle road racing World Championship and was the first person to lap the Isle of Man TT mountain circuit at over 100 mph on a pushrod-engined motorcycle. He was also the first person to win a World Championship motorcycle race on a Japanese machine.

== Personal and early life ==
Phillis was born in Sydney and grew up in Marrickville where his father was a despatch rider. He became a keen bicycle racer, but retired from that sport after a serious crash at Henson Park. After leaving school at 16, Phillis had taken up a motor mechanic apprenticeship. His first experience of motorcycling came with the job, where he had to use a 125cc Excelsior motorcycle to deliver messages around Sydney, and it was there that he began to develop an interest in motorcycles. His father was supportive, and when he was 17, Phillis bought his first bike, a 1939 High Cam Sunbeam B25. This bike was followed by several Velocette MAC's, and it was on one of these road-going bikes, that Tom entered his first motorcycle events; trials, grass track racing, and scrambling. In 1952, Phillis was called up for six months National Service, which he served in the Royal Australian Air Force.

Known as Ted to his family, Phillis married Betty in 1955. They went on to have two children, Debra Ann and Thomas Braddan. Phillis was well-liked, modest and known for his dry sense of humour. He also developed a reputation for poor timekeeping, and having arrived late for the German GP in 1958, and being told that he would not be allowed to practice, shrugged his shoulders and said "Well, I'd better set off for next week's Swedish GP to get there on time."

== Career ==
=== 1953–1957: Early years ===
With support from his father, Phillis began motorcycle racing, riding a Velocette MAC in the Canobolas Clubman's race at the Gnoo Blas circuit on 3 October 1953 where he retired. He took his first win in the fourth event he entered, again riding the Velocette in the second division Junior Clubman's race at the Mount Druitt circuit on 21 November 1954. Betty helped him to buy a BSA Gold Star in 1955, and this period was spent largely gaining experience. It wasn't until the BSA was replaced by a two-year-old Manx Norton in 1957 that Phillis started to achieve more notable success. Racing against top Australian riders at the airfield circuit at Fishermans Bend, Melbourne, he won the 350cc class and finished third in the 500cc class, equalling the lap record.

=== 1958–1962: International career ===
In 1958, Phillis and his wife sold everything and came to Europe, where they bought new 350cc and 500cc Manx Nortons. Phillis was lauded as "Star of the Day" at his first appearance at Thruxton, where he won the 500cc Senior event after a race-long battle with Derek Powell and set a new 500cc lap record. He also won the 350cc Junior event. He repeated this "double" shortly afterwards at the International Västkustloppet road race on the Falkenberg circuit near Skrea in Sweden, establishing himself as one of the top privateers in Europe.

On 1 May 1959, Phillis won the prestigious, pre-season Mettet Grand Prix invitational race. Also in 1959, he was chosen by the Auto Cycle Council of Australia as their "most promising rider", and given a grant to take part in the 1959 Isle of Man TT although he was omitted from the official Australian team for the event. He was fifth in the 350cc Formula 1 TT, and retired from the Junior TT on the last lap with a broken con-rod while positioned at eleventh place. He was seventh at the end of the first lap of the Senior TT, but struggled with torrential rain and high winds and eventually finished sixteenth.

In 1960, Phillis became the first non-Japanese rider to be signed on by the Honda motorcycle racing team, and was given rides in both the 125cc and 250cc Lightweight TTs. In the 125cc race, Phillis was the leading Honda and lying in sixth place on the second lap when he had stop at the pits to change a plug, eventually finishing tenth. In the 250cc race, he was in fourth place, and challenging for third when he had to retire on the fourth lap with gearbox failure. Phillis also took part in the Senior TT on his Norton, and worked his way up from eighth on the first lap to finish fourth, behind Surtees, Hartle and Hailwood. Set to compete for Honda in the Dutch TT shortly afterwards, Phillis fell during practice and broke his right collar bone and his place was taken by Jim Redman. Phillis was back for the Commonwealth Trophy meeting at Thruxton a month later, breaking the lap record and winning the 350cc race, and finishing third in the Commonwealth Trophy. Returning to his 250cc Honda for the Ulster Grand Prix, Phillis closed dramatically on the MV Agusta of Carlo Ubbiali, eventually finishing second, only two seconds behind. Phillis fell off his 125cc Honda in Ulster while lying fourth, but did better at Brands Hatch a fortnight later, chasing Mike Hailwood throughout, despite being hampered by "a gearbox full of neutrals". After the race, Phillis talked of confining himself to the 125cc and 250cc Hondas for 1961 if Honda offered him another contract. A few weeks later, Phillis dominated the Pyynikki TT at the Tampere Circuit in Finland. Not only winning 125, 250 and 350cc events, but also setting record lap times in every race.

Phillis began 1961 with equal prowess, when at the Victorian Grand Prix event at Phillip Island, he won the 250 and 350cc events on a Honda and the Senior A-grade race and 500cc events on a Norton, setting lap records for 250cc, 350cc and 500cc classes. In 1961, he won Honda's first championship race when he took the 1961 125cc Spanish Grand Prix. He went on to win the FIM 1961 125cc World Championship. This was also Honda's first world championship. He finished second to Mike Hailwood in the 250cc class. He was also the first man to lap the Isle of Man TT mountain circuit at over 100 mph (161 km/h) on a push rod engined machine, riding to third place on the Doug Hele prepared 500 cc Norton "Domiracer".

== Death ==
Phillis died while competing in the 1962 Isle of Man TT, crashing on the second lap of the 350 cc Junior TT at Laurel Bank. He was cremated and his ashes were scattered at the TT race course startline. The defending 500 cc world champion, Gary Hocking, was so affected by the death of his friend that he immediately retired from competitive motorcycling.

== Motorcycle Grand Prix results ==
**Position**	1	2	3	4	5	6
**Points**	8	6	4	3	2	1

(key) (Races in bold indicate pole position; races in italics indicate fastest lap)

Year	Class	Team	1	2	3	4	5	6	7	8	9	10	11	Points	Rank	Wins
1958	350cc	Norton	IOM; 32	NED -	BEL -	GER -	SWE -	ULS -	NAT -					0	-	0
1958	500cc	Norton	IOM; 18	NED -	BEL -	GER -	SWE -	ULS -	NAT -					0	-	0
1959	350cc	Norton	FRA -	IOM; NC	GER -			SWE -	ULS; 5	NAT -				2	13th	0
1959	500cc	Norton	FRA -	IOM; 16	GER -	NED -	BEL -		ULS -	NAT -				0	-	0
1960	125cc	Honda		IOM; 10	NED -	BEL -		ULS -	NAT -					0	-	0
1960	250cc	Honda		IOM; NC	NED -	BEL -	GER -	ULS; 2	NAT -					6	6th	0
1960	350cc	Norton	FRA -	IOM; NC	NED -			ULS -	NAT -					0	-	0
1960	500cc	Norton	FRA -	IOM; 4	NED -	BEL -	GER -	ULS; 6	NAT -					4	11th	0
1961	125cc	Honda	ESP; 1	GER; NC	FRA; 1	IOM; 3	NED; 1	BEL; 2	DDR; 2	ULS; 3	NAT; 4	SWE; 6	ARG; 1	44	**1st**	4
1961	250cc	Honda	ESP; 2	GER; NC	FRA; 1	IOM; 2	NED; NC	BEL; 2	DDR; 4	ULS; 4	NAT; 3	SWE; 6	ARG; 1	38	**2nd**	2
1961	350cc	Norton		GER -		IOM; NC	NED; 1		DDR; 1	ULS; 1	NAT; 1	SWE -		0	-	0
1961	500cc	Norton		GER -	FRA -	IOM; 3	NED -	BEL -	DDR -	ULS -	NAT -	SWE -	ARG -	4	12th	0
1962	50cc	Honda	ESP; 8	FRA -	IOM -	NED -	BEL -	GER -	ULS -	DDR -	NAT -	FIN -	ARG -	0	-	0
1962	125cc	Honda	ESP -	FRA -	IOM; 3	NED -	BEL -	GER -	ULS -	DDR -	NAT -	FIN -	ARG -	4	13th	0
1962	250cc	Honda	ESP; 3	FRA; 3	IOM; 3	NED -	BEL -	GER -	ULS -	DDR -	NAT -	FIN -	ARG -	12	4th	0
1962	350cc	Honda			IOM; NC	NED -		ULS -	DDR -	NAT -	FIN -			0	-	0

== Bibliography ==
- Flack, Darryl (30 August 2023). The Immortals of Australian Motorcycle Racing: The World Champs (Part of the 7-volume comprehensive sports collection). Immortals of Australian Sport (7-book series). Gelding Street Press. ISBN 978-0-6452070-5-7.

Preceded by Carlo Ubbiali	125cc Motorcycle World Champion; 1961	Succeeded by Luigi Taveri
