= Honda RC112 =

50cc racing motorcycle

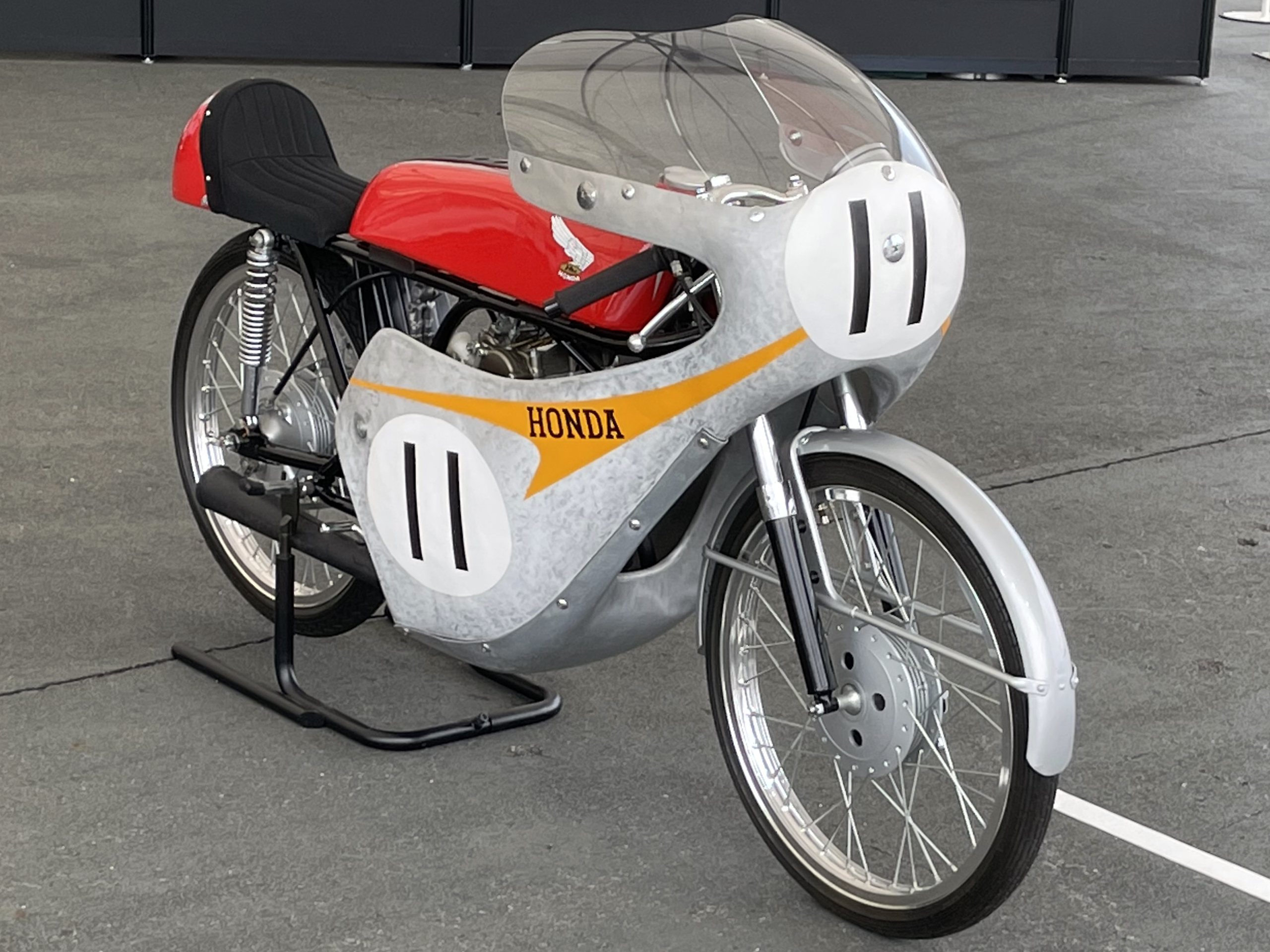
- Honda RC112 on display at the Suzuka Circuit 60th Anniversary Fan Appreciation Day, 2002
- Manufacturer: Honda
- Production: 1962
- Predecessor: Honda RC111
- Successor: Honda RC113
- Engine: 49.6 cc (3.03 cu in) air cooled DOHC twin
- Bore / stroke: 33 mm × 29 mm (1.3 in × 1.1 in)
- Compression ratio: 10.5:1
- Power: 11 bhp (8.2 kW) @ 17,500 rpm
- Torque: 0.45 kg⋅m (4.4 N⋅m; 3.3 lbf⋅ft) @ 15,000 rpm
- Ignition type: Magneto
- Fuel delivery: 2 16 mm (0.63 in) Keihin carburettors
- Transmission: multi-plate dry clutch, 9 speed gearbox, chain drive
- Tyres: F: 2.00x18 R: 2.25x18
- Weight: 62.5 kg (138 lb) (dry)

The Honda RC112 is a 50 cc (3.1 cu in) air cooled DOHC inline-twin racing motorcycle that was manufactured by Honda in 1962. It was the world's first 50cc DOHC twin racer and it only competed in one race, the All Japan Championship held at the Suzuka Circuit. Tommy Robb won the race on a RC112.

== History ==
In 1962 the FIM introduced a new class to the World Championship for 50cc machines. Honda entered the championship but their single cylinder RC110 was not as quick as the Suzuki and Kreidler two strokes they were competing against. Although an updated machine, the RC111, was introduced for the Isle of Man TT they were still not competitive.

Soon after the TT, Honda began developing a twin cylinder machine, the RC112. Engineer Shoichiro Irimajiri played a major part in the development. (Note: Irimajiri also designed the twin cylinder 50 cc RC115, five cylinder RC148, six cylinder RC166 and worked on the RA270 Formula 1 engine. Irimajiri later led the design teams for the Gold Wing and CBX.) Soon after development of a large valve version, the 2RC112 started. Neither variant was developed enough for the world championship, but the RC112 was ready for the All Japan Championship. The race was held at the Suzuka Circuit and was the inaugural race at the newly finished, Honda owned circuit.

Luigi Taveri tried the RC112 in practice but chose to use the single cylinder RC111 for the race. Tommy Robb and Naomi Taniguchi used the RC112 in the race. Ernst Degner comfortably led the race on a Suzuki RM62 until he crashed at the 80R corner on lap 4, (Note: Turn 8 was originally known as 80R from its 80 m (260 ft) radius. Some sources give the reason for it being renamed the Degner Curve coming from his crash in this inaugural race, being the first person to crash at the new circuit. Other sources link it to Degner's crash in the 250 race the following season. Later turn 8 following turn 9 became known as the Degner Curves.) leaving Michio Ichino, also riding a Suzuki, in the lead with a large gap back to the rest of the pack. Ichino crashed on the final leaving Robb, Hugh Anderson and Isao Morishita battling for the lead. Robb pulled away to win the race. Taniguchi finished joint 4th with Seiichi Suzuki. Rob later stated that he thought the twin was far better than the single. "Very smooth, excellent power and the handling was superb. It was also an excellent riding position and didn't feel as cramped as the old single".

Although it won the race at Suzuka, the bike was inferior to the Suzuki RM62. Development continued on the RC112 and 2RC112. In January 1963 development started on a new 4 valves per cylinder engine, the RC113. Development of the RC112 stopped soon after. By the start of the 1963 season Honda still did not have a competitive engine. Honda had cut back on its racing budget and the decision was made not to compete in the 50cc class as this was the class least likely to bring results.

== Bibliography ==
- Frank, Aaron P. (2003). Honda Motorcycles. MotorBooks International. ISBN 978-1-61060-958-6.
- Hsu, Ben (12 August 2022). "Japan's motorsports history unfolds at Suzuka Circuit in the 1960s". Japanese Nostalgic Car.
- Kortekaas, Joep. "Honda's Race History - 1962". www.vf750fd.com.
- Oxley, Mat (17 November 2023). "Honda's 1960s Japanese screamers — the motorcycles that changed grand prix racing". Motor Sport Magazine.
- Pereira, Chris (2014). Motorcycle GP Racing in the 1960s. David and Charles. ISBN 978-1-78711-879-9.
- Walker, Mick (2002). Mick Walker's Japanese Grand Prix Racing Motorcycles. Redline Books. ISBN 978-0-9531311-8-1.
