= Kunimitsu Takahashi =

Japanese motorcycle racer and racing driver (1940–2022)

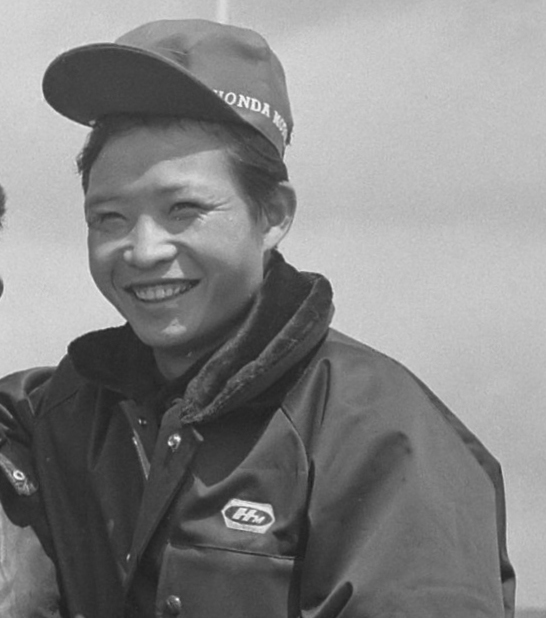
- Takahashi in 1963
- Nationality: (Japan) Japanese
- Born: 29 January 1940; Tokyo, Japan
- Died: 16 March 2022 (aged 82)
Motorcycle racing career statistics
Grand Prix motorcycle racing
Active years	1960–1964
First race	1960 250cc German Grand Prix
Last race	1964 125cc French Grand Prix
First win	1961 250cc German Grand Prix
Last win	1962 125cc Spanish Grand Prix
Team	Honda
Starts / Wins / Podiums / Poles / F. laps / Points; 129 / 4 / 15 / N/A / 3 / 107

Formula One World Championship career
- Active years: 1977
- Team: non-works Tyrrell
- Entries: 1
- Championships: 0
- Wins: 0
- Podiums: 0
- Career points: 0
- Pole positions: 0
- Fastest laps: 0
- First entry: 1977 Japanese Grand Prix

24 Hours of Le Mans career
- Years: 1986–1990, 1994–1996
- Teams: Team Kunimitsu Honda, Kremer Racing
- Best finish: 8th (1995)
- Class wins: 1 (1995)

Kunimitsu Takahashi (Shinjitai: 高橋 国光, Takahashi Kunimitsu; 29 January 1940 – 16 March 2022) was a Japanese professional motorcycle road racer, racing driver, and team manager. Nicknamed "Kuni-san", he is known as the "father of drifting".

Takahashi's racing career lasted from 1958 to 1999. He competed on motorcycles between 1958 and 1963, during which he became the first Japanese rider to win a World Grand Prix, taking four world-level wins in total. Injuries sustained in a crash in 1962 led to him switching to four-wheels in 1965, after which he won the 24 Hours of Le Mans in class, become a four-time All-Japan Sports Prototype Champion, and won in Japanese Top Formula, JTC, and JGTC. His final victory as a driver came in 1999 at the age of 59.

Takahashi's racing team, Team Kunimitsu, has won multiple championships in Super GT. He was the chairman of the GT Association, the organizers of the Super GT series, from 1993 to 2007.

== Motorcycle racing ==
In 1961, Takahashi became the first Japanese rider to win a motorcycle Grand Prix riding a 250cc Honda to victory at Hockenheim. His best World Championship finishes were a fourth place in the 1961 250 world championship and a fourth place in the 1962 125 world championship, both times on a Honda. He was seriously injured in the 1962 Isle of Man TT and switched to car racing in 1965. He won four Grand Prix races during his motorcycle racing career.

== Car racing ==
Takahashi participated in one Formula One race, the 1977 Japanese Grand Prix on 23 October 1977, driving the non-works Tyrrell that Kazuyoshi Hoshino had used in the 1976 Japanese Grand Prix. Takahashi finished ninth in his single Grand Prix outing, thus he scored no championship points. From 1987 to 1992, he competed in the Japanese Formula 3000 championship. He also competed in eight 24 Hours of Le Mans races between 1986 and 1996. In the 1995 24 Hours of Le Mans, his team competed with a Honda NSX, winning the GT2 Class and finishing eighth overall.

In 1994, Takahashi formed Team Kunimitsu to compete in the inaugural JGTC season, running a Porsche 911 RSR Turbo in the GT1 class alongside Keiichi Tsuchiya. In 1996, with the advent of the GT500 class, Team Kunimitsu switched manufacturers from Porsche to Honda. The next year, Team Kunimitsu cars wore the Raybrig colors for the first time. Takahashi drove for his own team until 1999. He retired at the end of the season to focus on team management. Team Kunimitsu won their first Drivers Championship in 2018 with Naoki Yamamoto and 2009 Formula One champion Jenson Button behind the wheel of the #100 Raybrig Honda.

== Death ==
Takahashi died from lymphoma on 16 March 2022, at the age of 82.

== Career motorsports results ==
=== Motorcycle Grand Prix results ===
(key) (Races in italics indicate fastest lap)

Year	Class	Team	1	2	3	4	5	6	7	8	9	10	11	12	Points	Rank	Wins
1960	125cc	Honda	IOM	NED	BEL		ULS; 6	NAT							1	10th	0
1960	250cc	Honda	IOM	NED	BEL	GER; 6	ULS; 5	NAT; 4							6	7th	0
1961	125cc	Honda	ESP	GER; 6	FRA; 6	IOM	NED	BEL	DDR; 3	ULS; 1	NAT	SWE; 2	ARG; 3		24	5th	1
1961	250cc	Honda	ESP	GER; 1	FRA; 3	IOM; 4	NED	BEL	DDR; 3	ULS; 6	NAT	SWE; 3	ARG; 2		29	4th	1
1962	50cc	Honda	ESP; 6	FRA; 2	IOM	NED	BEL	GER		DDR	NAT	FIN	ARG		7	9th	0
1962	125cc	Honda	ESP; 1	FRA; 1	IOM; NC	NED	BEL	GER	ULS	DDR	NAT	FIN	ARG		16	4th	2
1963	50cc	Honda	ESP	GER	FRA	IOM	NED	BEL			FIN		ARG	JPN; 11	0	-	0
1963	125cc	Honda	ESP; 3	GER; 5	FRA; 3	IOM; 8	NED; 5	BEL	ULS; 5	DDR	FIN	NAT; 3	ARG	JPN	14	7th	0
1963	250cc	Honda	ESP; 4	GER; NC		IOM; NC	NED	BEL; 6	ULS; 4	DDR		NAT	ARG	JPN	7	9th	0
1964	50cc	Honda	USA	ESP; NC	FRA	IOM	NED	BEL	GER			FIN		JPN	0	-	0
1964	125cc	Honda	USA	ESP	FRA; 4	IOM	NED		GER	DDR	ULS	FIN	NAT	JPN	3	14th	0

=== Complete Formula One results ===
(key)

Year	Entrant	Chassis	Engine	1	2	3	4	5	6	7	8	9	10	11	12	13	14	15	16	17	WDC	Points
1977	Meiritsu Racing Team	Tyrrell 007	Cosworth DFV 3.0 V8	ARG	BRA	RSA	USW	ESP	MON	BEL	SWE	FRA	GBR	GER	AUT	NED	ITA	USA	CAN	JPN; 9	NC	0

=== Super Formula Championship results ===
(key) (Races in bold indicate pole position) (Races in italics indicate fastest lap)

Year	Entrant	1	2	3	4	5	6	7	8	9	10	11	DC	Points
1975	Sakai Racing Shop	FUJ; DNS											NC	0
1975	Racing Shop Yatsuka		SUZ; Ret	FUJ	SUZ	SUZ							NC	0
1976	Sakai Racing Shop	FUJ; Ret	SUZ	FUJ; 4	SUZ; 3	SUZ; Ret							6th	22
1977	Speed Star Racing	SUZ; 1	SUZ; 4	**MIN**; 1	SUZ; 3	FUJ; 2	FUJ; 3	SUZ; 1	SUZ; 3				**2nd**	**87 (117)**
1978	Speed Star Wheel Racing	SUZ; Ret	FUJ; 5	SUZ; Ret	SUZ; Ret	SUZ; 5	MIN	SUZ; 1					6th	40
1979	Speed Star Wheel Racing	SUZ; 8	MIN; 2	SUZ; 9	FUJ; 2	SUZ; 4	SUZ; 5	SUZ; 6					4th	57 (64)
1980	Royce Racing Team Suzuki Racing	SUZ	MIN	SUZ; Ret	SUZ; Ret	SUZ	SUZ; 7						15th	4
1981	Suzuki Racing	SUZ; 5	SUZ; 4	SUZ; 10	SUZ; 10	SUZ; 8							8th	23
1982	Shift	SUZ; Ret	FUJ; Ret	SUZ; 5	SUZ; 12	SUZ; 10	SUZ; 13						15th	9
1983	Nova Engineering	SUZ; 7	FUJ; 2	MIN; 2	SUZ; 8	SUZ; Ret	FUJ; 9	SUZ; 4	SUZ; Ret				6th	46
1984	Advan Sports Nova	SUZ; 13	FUJ; Ret	MIN; 6	SUZ; 10	SUZ; 11	FUJ; Ret	SUZ; 7	SUZ; 11				13th	11
1985	Advan Sports Nova	SUZ; 9	FUJ; 11	MIN	SUZ; 8	SUZ; Ret	FUJ; 7	SUZ; 12	SUZ; 5				13th	17
1986	Team JPS Advan	SUZ; 6	FUJ; Ret	MIN; 8	SUZ; 8	SUZ; 9	FUJ; 11	SUZ; 5	SUZ; Ret				10th	22
1987	Advan Sports Nova	SUZ; 6	FUJ; 7	MIN; 8	SUZ; 6	SUZ; 9	SUG; 6	FUJ; 8	SUZ; 8	SUZ; Ret			9th	33
1988	Advan Sports Nova	SUZ; 3	FUJ; Ret	MIN; 7	SUZ; 5	SUG; 6	FUJ; 3	SUZ; 10	SUZ; 6				7th	12
1989	Advan Sports Nova	SUZ; 12	FUJ; 15	MIN; 8	SUZ; 12	SUG; 4	FUJ; 11	SUZ; 14	SUZ; 8				15th	3
1990	Advan Sports Nova	SUZ; 12	FUJ; 14	MIN; 7	SUZ; 4	SUG; 20	FUJ; 10	FUJ; 3	SUZ; 12	FUJ; 8	SUZ; Ret		9th	7
1991	Advan Sports Nova	SUZ; DNQ	AUT; 20	FUJ; 22	MIN; 14	SUZ; DNQ	SUG; 16	FUJ; 21	SUZ; 20	FUJ; C	SUZ; 11	FUJ; Ret	32nd	0
1992	Advan Sport Pal	SUZ; 15	FUJ; Ret	MIN; Ret	SUZ; Ret	AUT; 15	SUG; Ret	FUJ; 12	FUJ; 11	SUZ; Ret	FUJ; 22	SUZ; 7	22nd	0
1993	Advan Sport Pal	SUZ; Ret	FUJ; 11	MIN; 9	SUZ; 12	AUT; C	SUG; 10	FUJ; C	FUJ; 9	SUZ; 9	FUJ; 18	SUZ; Ret	20th	0
1994	Advan Sport Pal	SUZ; 12	FUJ; Ret	MIN	SUZ; 8	SUG	FUJ; 8	SUZ; 11	FUJ; 3	FUJ; 10	SUZ; 14		10th	4

=== All-Japan Sports Prototype Championship results ===
Year	Team	Car	Class	1	2	3	4	5	6	7	Rank	Points
1984	Advan Nova	Porsche 956	C1	SUZ	TSU	**SUZ**; 1	FUJ				9th	20
1985	Advan Nova	Porsche 962C	C1	**SUZ**; 3	**FUJ**; Ret	**FUJ**; 1	SUZ; 1	FUJ; Ret	FUJ; 1		**1st**	**72**
1986	Advan Nova	Porsche 962C	C1	**SUZ**; 1	**FUJ**; 1	FUJ; 2	SUZ; Ret	FUJ; 8	FUJ; 2		**1st**	**70**
1987	Advan Nova	Porsche 962C	C1	SUZ; 2	FUJ; 3	FUJ; 1	SUZ; 3	FUJ; 11	FUJ; 1		**1st**	**59**
1988	Advan Nova	Porsche 962C	C1	FUJ; 3	SUZ; Ret	FUJ; 2	FUJ; Ret	SUZ; 2	FUJ; 6		4th	48
1989	Advan Nova	Porsche 962C	C1	FUJ; 6	FUJ; 4	FUJ; 4	SUZ; 1	FUJ; 4			**1st**	**56**
1990	Advan Nova	Porsche 962C	C1	FUJ; 8	FUJ; C	FUJ; 5	SUZ; Ret	SUG; 6	FUJ; Ret		22nd	9
1991	Team Taisan	Porsche 962C	C1	FUJ; 5	FUJ; Ret	FUJ	SUZ	SUG	FUJ	SUG	27th	8

=== 24 Hours of Le Mans results ===
Year	Team	Co-Drivers	Car	Class	Laps	Pos.	Class Pos.
1986	(Germany) Kremer Racing	(Austria) Jo Gartner (South Africa) Sarel van der Merwe	Porsche 962C	C1	169	NC	NC
1987	(Germany) Kremer Racing	(Denmark) Kris Nissen (Germany) Volker Weidler	Porsche 962C	C1	6	DNF	DNF
1988	(Germany) Kremer Racing	(Japan) Hideki Okada (Italy) Bruno Giacomelli	Porsche 962C	C1	370	9th	9th
1989	(Germany) Kremer Racing	(Italy) Bruno Giacomelli (Italy) Giovanni Lavaggi	Porsche 962C	C1	303	DNF	DNF
1990	(Germany) Kremer Racing	(South Africa) Sarel van der Merwe (Japan) Hideki Okada	Porsche 962C	C1	279	24th	21st
1994	(Germany) Kremer Honda Racing	(Japan) Keiichi Tsuchiya (Japan) Akira Iida	Honda NSX GT2	GT2	222	18th	9th
1995	(Japan) Team Kunimitsu	(Japan) Keiichi Tsuchiya (Japan) Akira Iida	Honda NSX GT2	GT2	275	8th	**1st**
1996	(Japan) Team Kunimitsu	(Japan) Keiichi Tsuchiya (Japan) Akira Iida	Honda NSX GT2	GT2	305	16th	**3rd**

=== Complete JGTC results ===
(key) (Races in bold indicate pole position) (Races in italics indicate fastest lap)

Year	Team	Car	Class	1	2	3	4	5	6	7	Rank	Points
1994	Team Kunimitsu	Porsche 911 RSR-T	GT1	FUJ	SEN	FUJ; Ret	SUG; 1	MIN; 2			7th	35
1995	Team Kunimitsu	Porsche 911 RSR-T	GT1	SUZ; 14	FUJ; 3	SEN; 4	FUJ; 8	SUG; 8	MIN; Ret		10th	28
1996	Team Kunimitsu	Honda NSX	GT500	SUZ; Ret	FUJ; 8	SEN; 12	FUJ; 7	SUG; 10	MIN; 11		17th	8
1997	Team Kunimitsu	Honda NSX	GT500	SUZ	FUJ; Ret	SEN; 16	FUJ; 11	MIN; 2	**SUG**; 2		9th	30
1998	Team Kunimitsu	Honda NSX	GT500	**SUZ**; 10	FUJ; C	SEN; 12	**FUJ**; Ret	MOT; 7	**MIN**; 1	SUG; Ret	10th	25
1999	Team Kunimitsu	Honda NSX	GT500	SUZ; Ret	FUJ; 1	SUG; 13	MIN; 15	FUJ; 7	TAI; 5	MOT; 9	11th	34

=== Complete British Saloon Car Championship results ===
(key) (Races in bold indicate pole position; races in italics indicate fastest lap.)

Year	Team	Car	Class	1	2	3	4	5	6	7	8	9	10	11	12	DC	Pts	Class
1985	Mitsubishi Colt Racing	Mitsubishi Starion Turbo	A	SIL	OUL	THR	DON	THR	SIL	DON	SIL	SNE	BRH	BRH	SIL ovr:9 cls:8	NC	0	NC

=== Complete Japanese Touring Car Championship results ===
Year	Team	Car	Class	1	2	3	4	5	6	7	8	9	DC	Pts
1986	STP Ralliart	Mitsubishi Starion Turbo	Div.3	NIS; 4	SUG; 2	TSU; 1	SEN; Ret	FUJ; Ret	SUZ; 2				?	?
1987	STP Ralliart	Mitsubishi Starion Turbo	Div.3	NIS; 1	SEN; 1	TSU; Ret	SUG; 18	FUJ; 10	SUZ; Ret				?	?
1988	STP Ralliart	Mitsubishi Starion Turbo	JTC-1	SUZ	NIS; 4	SEN; 2	TSU; Ret	SUG; Ret	FUJ; 15				?	?
1992	Team Taisan	Nissan Skyline GT-R	JTC-1	AID; 4	AUT; Ret	SUG; 3	SUZ; 3	MIN; 17	TSU; 2	SEN; 4	FUJ; 17		9th	74
1993	Team Taisan	Nissan Skyline GT-R	JTC-1	MIN; Ret	AUT; 1	SUG; Ret	SUZ; 2	AID; 5	TSU; 4	TOK; 6	SEN; Ret	FUJ; Ret	11th	59
