= No. 13 Signals Unit RAAF =

WWII Australian Air Force unit

No. 13 Signals Unit RAAF was a Royal Australian Air Force signals unit during World War II.

The unit formed at Mount Druitt Aerodrome, Mount Druitt, New South Wales on 22 November 1943. On 3 December 1943, the unit travelled to No. 2 Embarkation Depot at RAAF Bradfield Park, Lindfield, New South Wales to be kitted out and medically evaluated.

Unit headquarters was set up at Strathpine, Queensland on 7 December 1943, with a complement of 19 officers and 294 airmen.

Orders to embark were received and the unit arrived at Lae, Papua New Guinea on 28 January 1944, before making their way to Nadzab, Papua New Guinea where a camp was established. At Nadzab, the unit established a wireless transmitting station which became operational on 25 February 1944.

Between 12 March – 16 March 1944, the unit moved to Cape Gloucester. Personnel took part in Operation Persecution between 21 April – 27 April 1944, and a detachment was also involved in Operation Red Herring.

The unit relocated to Tadji, Papua New Guinea in May 1944. On 30 June 1944, No. 13 Signals Unit was disbanded and was reformed as No. 4 Radio Installation Maintenance Unit RAAF.
