= Mount Druitt Aerodrome =

- IATA: none; ICAO: none

Summary
- Coordinates: 33°45′25.18″S 150°47′43.9″E
- Interactive map of Mount Druitt Aerodrome

Runways
Direction	Length		Surface
Direction	ft	m	Surface
335 / 025	5,000	1,524
- disused

Mount Druitt Aerodrome was a Royal Australian Air Force (RAAF) landing ground during World War II at Mount Druitt, New South Wales, Australia.

Land was commandeered in March 1942, for the construction of an aerodrome, two aircraft hangars and workshops on the site.

The aerodrome was utilised for a period of time, after World War II, as a storage facility (bomb dump) for United States Army Air Forces and 10,000 500lb general purpose aerial bombs were placed upon the landing strip.

The runway ran down the center of the current Whalan Reserve in a roughly north–south (NNW-SSE) direction. After the war the fledgling Australian Racing Drivers Club ran races there (1951–53) at the Mt Druitt race track which incorporated part of the runway and taxi ways.

The land was not handed back to its owner until January 1951. Only a part of the land was handed back to the owner which is why the racing ended in 1956 when the club was preparing to bid for the fledgling F1 championship race to be held in Australia. Argument over land ownership and the right to hold the F1 race meeting ended when the owner of part of the track dug huge tranches in the track, 2 metres deep, this ended the life of this race track.

== Units based at Mount Druitt Aerodrome ==
- No. 13 Signals Unit RAAF
- No. 1 Repair and Salvage Unit RAAF
- No. 2 Repair and Salvage Unit RAAF (renamed to No. 2 Repair and Servicing Unit RAAF)
- No. 6 Repair and Salvage Unit RAAF
- No. 11 Repair and Salvage Unit RAAF
- No. 14 Repair and Salvage Unit RAAF
- No. 18 Repair and Salvage Unit RAAF

== See also ==
- NSW State Library photos of Mount Druitt Aerodrome
- Picture of bomb dump
- Map of the runway, race track and current photos
