= Tauno Nurmi =

Finnish motorcycle racer

Tauno Olavi Nurmi (25 April 1922 in Kangasala – 18 December 2014 in Tampere) was a Finnish motorcycle racing driver, an innovator and an accomplished veteran athlete.

== Life ==
In 1944, during the Continuation War between Finland and the Soviet Union, Nurmi took part in the battles at the Teikar Island (currently in Russian Karelia) and was injured in battle.

== Technical innovator ==
Nurmi started his career in Engineering as a planner for Valtion lentokonetehdas (Finnish State Aircraft Factory) and as a teacher of Technical Studies at Parantolaopisto and later at Pälkäne School. Besides his occupation as a teacher, Nurmi maintained an active career as an independent innovator in the technical field, especially in engine technology, for most of his life. His work was supported financially by several international oil companies as well as the Finnish government.

Nurmi's accomplishments as an innovator and a technician supersede those as a racing driver. His independently constructed V8 Premier racing motorcycle received global interest in its time. The V8 Premier was a 350cc V8-powered 4-stroke motorcycle engine with a V angle of 90°. The engine was air-cooled and each of its cylinders had its own carburetor.

== Racing driver ==
Nurmi was one of the pioneers of motorcycle racing and construction in Finland. He started his career as a TT motorcycle racer by winning the Estonian Nationals at the Pirita track in the 500 cm3 series. In the World Cup, he achieved several finishing positions in the top-ten and these international achievements entitled him to win bronze in 1962 and 1963, and silver in 1966 in the Finnish Cup. He was awarded with the gold medal by the Finnish Motor Association in 1965.

== Masters athlete ==
Later in life, Nurmi became an active athlete in different masters sports events, competing especially in speed skating. He won several medals in speed skating until the men's 85 series on the World, European and National level.
