= Teisuke Tanaka =

Japanese motorcycle racer

- Nationality: Japanese
Motorcycle racing career statistics
Grand Prix motorcycle racing
Active years	1960 - 1962, 1964
First race	1960 250cc West German Grand Prix
Last race	1964 125cc Japanese Grand Prix
First win	1962 125cc Nations Grand Prix
Last win	1962 125cc Nations Grand Prix
Team	Honda
Starts / Wins / Podiums / Poles / F. laps / Points; 12 / 1 / 4 / 0 / 0 / 30

Teisuke Tanaka (田中 楨助, Tanaka Teisuke; born April 13, 1937, died February 23, 2015) was a Grand Prix motorcycle road racer from Japan. Tanaka began his Grand Prix career in 1960 with Honda. He enjoyed his best season in 1962 when he won the 125cc Nations Grand Prix and finished the season in sixth place in the 125cc world championship.
