= Honda Cub F =

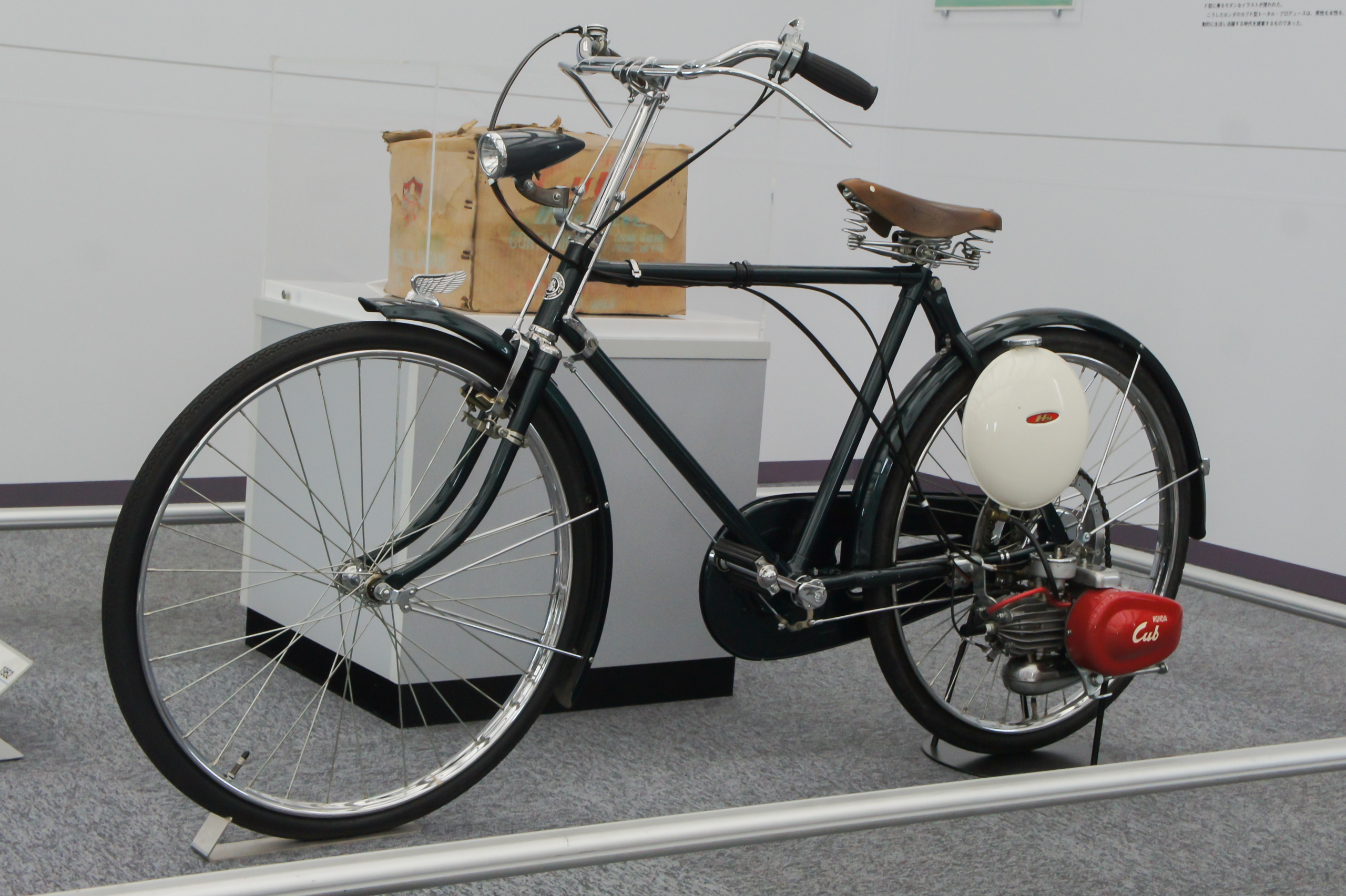
- The Honda Cub F engine, introduced in 1952, mounted on a bicycle at the Toyota Automobile Museum in October, 2005.
- Manufacturer: Honda Motor Company
- Also called: Type F
- Production: 1952-1954
- Successor: Honda Cub
- Class: Motorized bicycle power unit
- Engine: 50 cc (3.1 cu in) air-cooled, two-stroke single-cylinder
- Bore / stroke: 40 mm × 39.8 mm (1.57 in × 1.57 in)
- Top speed: 35 km/h (22 mph)
- Power: 1 hp (0.75 kW) @ 3,600 rpm
- Torque: 0.20 kg⋅m (2.0 N⋅m; 1.4 lbf⋅ft) @ 3,000 rpm
- Ignition type: Magneto
- Transmission: Variable 1-speed
- Weight: 7 kg (15 lb) (without bicycle) (dry)
- Fuel capacity: 3.2 L (0.70 imp gal; 0.85 US gal)

The Honda Cub F is a motorized bicycle, sometimes also categorized as a moped, introduced by Honda in 1952. It was a "clip-on" gasoline engine kit for bicycles produced by other manufacturers, identified by the slogan the white tank and the red engine (白いタンクに赤いエンジン) and popular for a design that prevented the two-stroke engine exhaust and oil from hitting the rider. The Society of Automotive Engineers of Japan (in Japanese), includes the 1952 Honda Cub F as one of their 240 Landmarks of Japanese Automotive Technology.

This product was a formative success for the new company, establishing their first nationwide independent dealer network. Managing director Takeo Fujisawa initiated a direct-mail campaign to the country's 50,000 bicycle dealers, generating about 30,000 replies, from which 13,000 dealers were chosen. He also instigated a hire-purchase scheme to allow customers to spread payments across 12 months. Honda shipped 6,000 Cub F units in October 1952, and 9,000 in December.

Production ceased in 1954, with the company citing consumer demand shifting to better products as Japan's postwar economy improved, and quality problems with the bicycle components that Honda had no control over.
