= Argentine motorcycle Grand Prix =

Motorcycle race held in Argentina

Coordinates: 34°41′39″S 58°27′34″W

Argentine Grand Prix

Grand Prix motorcycle racing
- Venue: Autódromo Oscar y Juan Gálvez (1961–1963, 1981–1982, 1987, 1994–1995, 1998–1999, 2027); Autódromo Termas de Río Hondo (2014–2019, 2022–2023, 2025)
- First race: 1961
- Most wins (rider): Marc Márquez (4)
- Most wins (manufacturer): Honda (19)

The Argentine motorcycle Grand Prix (Spanish: Gran Premio de Argentina) is a motorcycling event that is part of the FIM Grand Prix motorcycle racing season. Between 2014 and 2023 it was known as the Argentine Republic motorcycle Grand Prix.

== History ==
The Grand Prix returned in 2014 with a race at Autódromo Termas de Río Hondo. Previously, the event was held ten times at the Autódromo Oscar Alfredo Gálvez in the capital city of Buenos Aires.

The event is due to take place at the Autódromo Termas de Río Hondo until at least 2025, however the 2024 race was cancelled due to "current circumstances" in the country. And it is confirmed that the event will go back to Autódromo Oscar Alfredo Gálvez from 2027, however there will be no race in 2026 since the circuit is to be renovated.

=== Official names and sponsors ===
- 1982, 1987: Grand Prix de la República Argentina (no official sponsor)
- 1994–1995: Grand Prix Marlboro
- 1998–1999: Gran Premio Marlboro de Argentina
- 2014–2015: Gran Premio Red Bull de la República Argentina
- 2016–2019: Gran Premio Motul de la República Argentina
- 2022–2023: Gran Premio Michelin de la República Argentina
- 2025: Gran Premio YPF Energía de Argentina

== Winners ==
=== Multiple winners (riders) ===
# Wins	Rider	Wins	
# Wins	Rider	Category	Years won
4	(Spain) Marc Márquez	MotoGP	2014, 2016, 2019, 2025
3	(New Zealand) Hugh Anderson	125cc	1962
3	(New Zealand) Hugh Anderson	50cc	1962, 1963
3	(Australia) Mick Doohan	500cc	1994, 1995, 1998
2	(Australia) Tom Phillis	250cc	1961
2	(Australia) Tom Phillis	125cc	1961
2	(Spain) Ángel Nieto	125cc	1981, 1982
2	(Italy) Valentino Rossi	MotoGP	2015
2	(Italy) Valentino Rossi	250cc	1998
2	(France) Johann Zarco	Moto2	2015, 2016
2	(Italy) Marco Bezzecchi	MotoGP	2023
2	(Italy) Marco Bezzecchi	Moto3	2018

=== Multiple winners (manufacturers) ===
# Wins	Manufacturer	Wins	
# Wins	Manufacturer	Category	Years won
19	(Japan) Honda	MotoGP	2014, 2016, 2018, 2019
19	(Japan) Honda	500cc	1994, 1995, 1998
19	(Japan) Honda	250cc	1961, 1987, 1994
19	(Japan) Honda	Moto3	2015, 2016, 2017, 2023
19	(Japan) Honda	125cc	1961, 1963, 1995, 1998, 1999
8	(Germany) Kalex	Moto2	2014, 2015, 2016, 2017, 2018, 2019, 2022, 2023
7	(Japan) Yamaha	MotoGP	2015, 2017
7	(Japan) Yamaha	500cc	1982, 1987
7	(Japan) Yamaha	350cc	1982
7	(Japan) Yamaha	250cc	1999
7	(Japan) Yamaha	125cc	1994
4	(Japan) Suzuki	500cc	1999
4	(Japan) Suzuki	125cc	1962
4	(Japan) Suzuki	50cc	1962, 1963
4	(Austria) KTM	Moto3	2014, 2018, 2019, 2025
3	(Italy) Aprilia	MotoGP	2022
3	(Italy) Aprilia	250cc	1995, 1998
2	(United Kingdom) Matchless	500cc	1961, 1962
2	(Italy) Ducati	MotoGP	2023, 2025

=== By year ===
A pink background indicates an event that was not part of the Grand Prix motorcycle racing championship.

Year	Track	Moto3		Moto2		MotoGP		Report
Year	Track	Rider	Manufacturer	Rider	Manufacturer	Rider	Manufacturer	Report
2025	Termas de Río Hondo	(Spain) Ángel Piqueras	KTM	(United Kingdom) Jake Dixon	Boscoscuro	(Spain) Marc Márquez	Ducati	Report
2024	Termas de Río Hondo	Cancelled due to economic crisis in the country						
2023	Termas de Río Hondo	(Japan) Tatsuki Suzuki	Honda	(Italy) Tony Arbolino	Kalex	(Italy) Marco Bezzecchi	Ducati	Report
2022	Termas de Río Hondo	(Spain) Sergio García	GasGas	(Italy) Celestino Vietti	Kalex	(Spain) Aleix Espargaró	Aprilia	Report
2021	Termas de Río Hondo	Cancelled due to COVID-19 concerns						
2020	Termas de Río Hondo	Cancelled due to COVID-19 concerns						
2019	Termas de Río Hondo	(Spain) Jaume Masià	KTM	(Italy) Lorenzo Baldassarri	Kalex	(Spain) Marc Márquez	Honda	Report
2018	Termas de Río Hondo	(Italy) Marco Bezzecchi	KTM	(Italy) Mattia Pasini	Kalex	(United Kingdom) Cal Crutchlow	Honda	Report
2017	Termas de Río Hondo	(Spain) Joan Mir	Honda	(Italy) Franco Morbidelli	Kalex	(Spain) Maverick Viñales	Yamaha	Report
2016	Termas de Río Hondo	(Malaysia) Khairul Idham Pawi	Honda	(France) Johann Zarco	Kalex	(Spain) Marc Márquez	Honda	Report
2015	Termas de Río Hondo	(United Kingdom) Danny Kent	Honda	(France) Johann Zarco	Kalex	(Italy) Valentino Rossi	Yamaha	Report
2014	Termas de Río Hondo	(Italy) Romano Fenati	KTM	(Spain) Esteve Rabat	Kalex	(Spain) Marc Márquez	Honda	Report
Year	Track	125cc		250cc		500cc		Report
Year	Track	Rider	Manufacturer	Rider	Manufacturer	Rider	Manufacturer	Report
1999	Buenos Aires	(Italy) Marco Melandri	Honda	(France) Olivier Jacque	Yamaha	(United States) Kenny Roberts Jr.	Suzuki	Report
1998	Buenos Aires	(Japan) Tomomi Manako	Honda	(Italy) Valentino Rossi	Aprilia	(Australia) Mick Doohan	Honda	Report
1995	Buenos Aires	(Spain) Emilio Alzamora	Honda	(Italy) Max Biaggi	Aprilia	(Australia) Mick Doohan	Honda	Report
1994	Buenos Aires	(Spain) Jorge Martínez	Yamaha	(Japan) Tadayuki Okada	Honda	(Australia) Mick Doohan	Honda	Report

Year	Track	80cc		125cc		250cc		500cc		Report
Year	Track	Rider	Manufacturer	Rider	Manufacturer	Rider	Manufacturer	Rider	Manufacturer	Report
1987	Buenos Aires					(Spain) Sito Pons	Honda	(United States) Eddie Lawson	Yamaha	Report

Year	Track	50cc		125cc		250cc		350cc		500cc		Report
Year	Track	Rider	Manufacturer	Rider	Manufacturer	Rider	Manufacturer	Rider	Manufacturer	Rider	Manufacturer	Report
1982	Buenos Aires			(Spain) Ángel Nieto	Garelli			(Venezuela) Carlos Lavado	Yamaha	(United States) Kenny Roberts	Yamaha	Report
1981	Buenos Aires			(Spain) Ángel Nieto	Minarelli	(France) Jean-François Baldé	Kawasaki	(South Africa) Jon Ekerold	Bimota-Yamaha			Report
1963	Buenos Aires	(New Zealand) Hugh Anderson	Suzuki	(Federation of Rhodesia and Nyasaland) Jim Redman	Honda	(Italy) Tarquinio Provini	Morini			(United Kingdom) Mike Hailwood	MV Agusta	Report
1962	Buenos Aires	(New Zealand) Hugh Anderson	Suzuki	(New Zealand) Hugh Anderson	Suzuki	(United Kingdom) Arthur Wheeler	Moto Guzzi			(Argentina) Benedicto Caldarella	Matchless	Report
Year	Track			125cc		250cc		350cc		500cc		Report
Year	Track			Rider	Manufacturer	Rider	Manufacturer	Rider	Manufacturer	Rider	Manufacturer	Report
1961	Buenos Aires			(Australia) Tom Phillis	Honda	(Australia) Tom Phillis	Honda			(Argentina) Jorge Kissling	Matchless	Report
1960	Buenos Aires			(United Kingdom) John Grace	Bultaco	(Australia) Tom Phillis	Honda			(Argentina) Juan Carlos Salatino	Gilera	Report
