= Jorge Kissling =

Argentine motorcycle racer

- Nationality: Argentine
- Born: March 10, 1940
- Died: April 28, 1968 (aged 28); Buenos Aires, Argentina
Motorcycle racing career statistics
Grand Prix motorcycle racing
Active years	1961 - 1963
First race	1961 500cc Argentine Grand Prix
Last race	1963 500cc Argentine Grand Prix
First win	1961 500cc Argentine Grand Prix
Last win	1961 500cc Argentine Grand Prix
Starts / Wins / Podiums / Poles / F. laps / Points; 4 / 1 / 3 / 1 / 0 / 24

Jorge Carlos Kissling (March 10, 1940 – April 28, 1968) was a Grand Prix motorcycle road racer from Argentina. He won in his first Grand Prix race at the 1961 500cc Argentine Grand Prix. He ended the season ranked seventh overall.

Kissling died during a touring car race in Buenos Aires.
