= Jim Redman =

Zimbabwean motorcycle racer (born 1931)

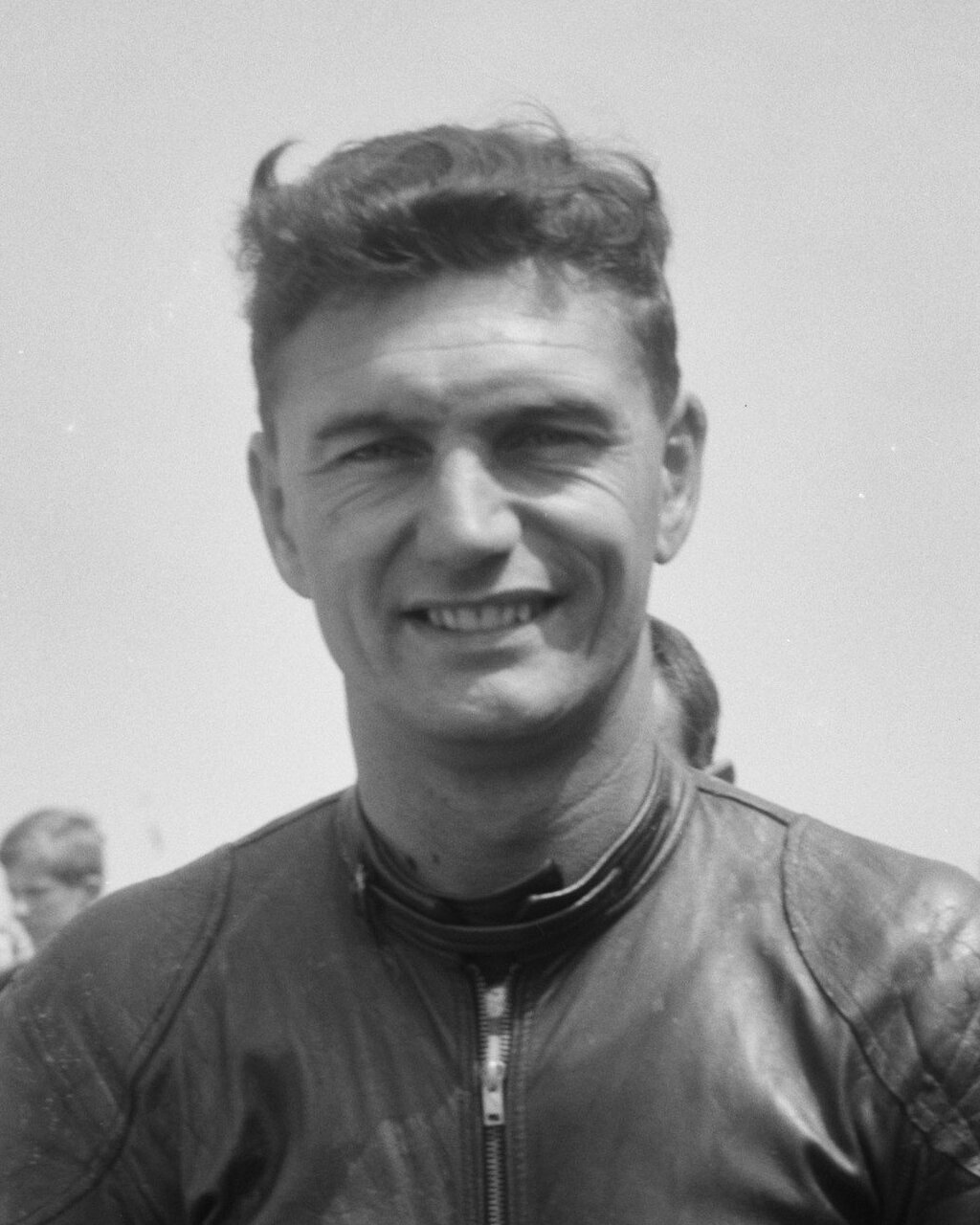
- Redman at the 1964 Dutch TT
- Nationality: Rhodesian
- Born: 8 November 1931 (age 95); London, England
Motorcycle racing career statistics
Grand Prix motorcycle racing
Active years	1959 – 1966
First race	1959 350cc West German Grand Prix
Last race	1966 250cc Belgian Grand Prix
First win	1961 250cc Belgian Grand Prix
Last win	1966 500cc Dutch TT
Team	Honda
Championships	250cc – 1962, 1963 350cc – 1962 – 1965
Starts / Wins / Podiums / Poles / F. laps / Points; 135 / 45 / 98 / N/A / 35 / 546

James Albert Redman, MBE (born 8 November 1931) is a Rhodesian former professional motorcycle racer. He competed in Grand Prix motorcycle racing from 1959 to 1966. Redman is notable for being a six-time Grand Prix road racing world champion. In 2012, the F.I.M. inducted Redman into the MotoGP Hall of Fame.

== History ==
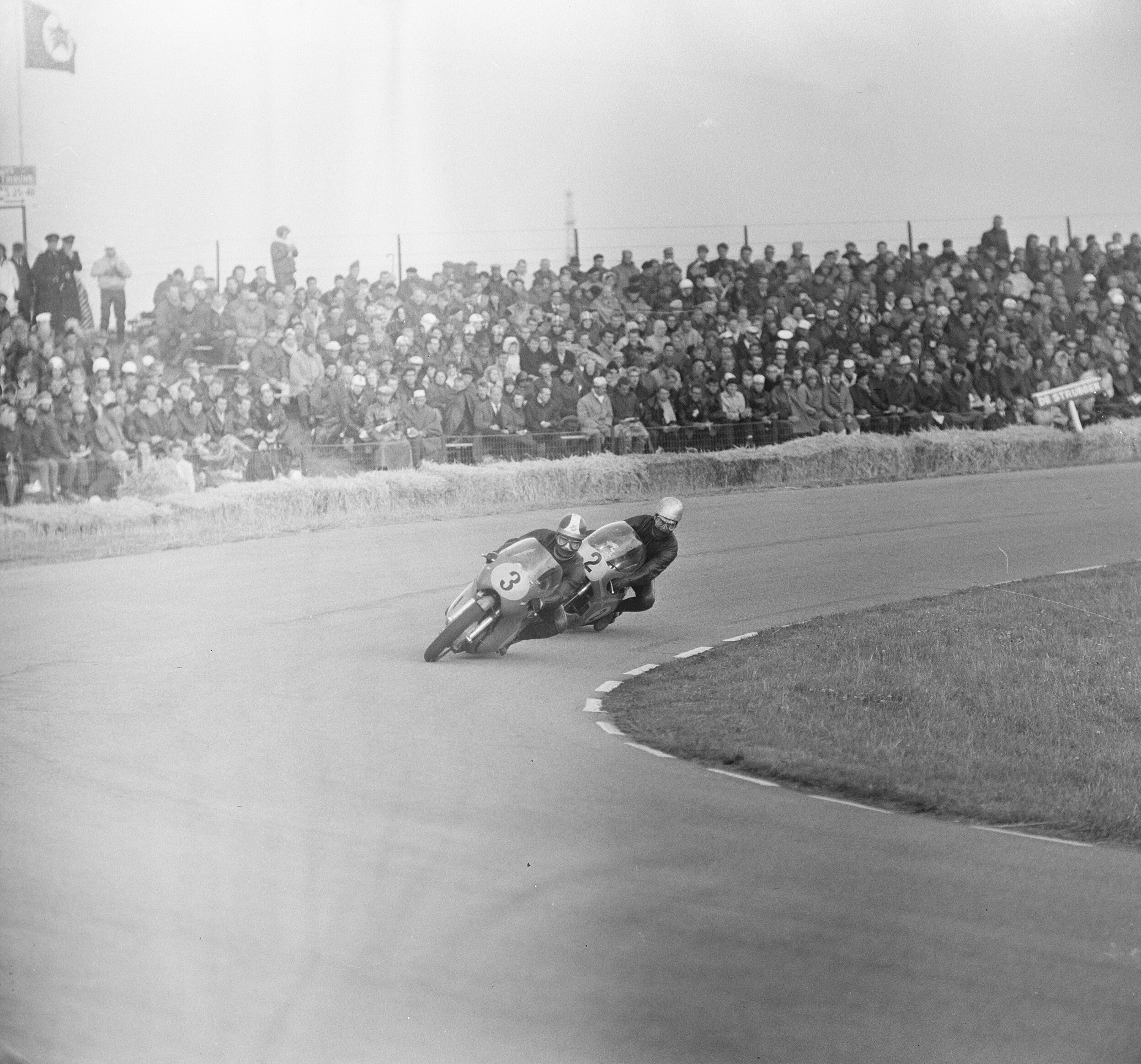
Redman (2) pursues Giacomo Agostini (3) during the 1966 500cc Dutch TT

Born in London, England, Redman emigrated to Rhodesia (now Zimbabwe) in 1952, where he began his racing career. He met with John Love who was changing from motorcycle racing to single-seat cars. Redman enthusiastically helped Love prepare and maintain his Cooper F3 with a Manx Norton 500 cc engine. In recognition for Redman's assistance, Love allowed Redman to ride his Triumph Grand Prix including use of his riding gear for his first racing experiences.

Redman acquired more experience on his home tracks, culminating in winning the 350 cc Rhodesian Championship, after which he aspired to European racing, starting at Brands Hatch in the company of Geoff Duke and a young, rising Mike Hailwood. After changing his riding style to better-suit the European circuits, Redman achieved some success, but retired from motorcycle racing and returned to Rhodesia in 1959. Still wanting to race, Redman returned to Europe where he hoped to secure a contract riding for Walter Kaaden's MZ team in 125 cc and 250 cc classes. He unexpectedly gained factory rides in selected races with Honda for part of the 1960 season due to an injury suffered by regular rider Tom Phillis, and became himself contracted for the 1961 season.

Redman would go on to claim four consecutive 350cc World Championships from 1962 to 1965. In 1962 and 1963 he claimed double championships winning both the 250cc and 350cc World Championships. After being injured at the 1966 Belgian Grand Prix, Redman made the decision to retire.

Redman was also a six-time Isle of Man TT winner, taking double wins in 1963, 1964 and 1965 in the Lightweight & Junior TT Races. He achieved a total of 45 Grand Prix victories. Redman was awarded the MBE for his achievements.

== Personal life ==
In 1966, Redman published a book about his racing career, Wheels of Fortune. In 2013, he published his book, Jim Redman: Six Times World Motorcycle Champion – The Autobiography.

== Grand Prix motorcycle racing results ==
Position	1	2	3	4	5	6
Points	8	6	4	3	2	1

(key) (Races in italics indicate fastest lap)

Year	Class	Team	1	2	3	4	5	6	7	8	9	10	11	12	13	Points	Rank	Wins
1959	350cc	Norton	FRA -	IOM -	GER; 6	NED -	BEL -	SWE; 6	ULS -	NAT -						2	15th	0
1959	500cc	Norton	FRA -	IOM -	GER -	NED; 5	BEL -	SWE -	ULS -	NAT -						2	15th	0
1960	125cc	Honda		IOM -	NED; 4	BEL; 9		ULS -	NAT; 4							6	7th	0
1960	250cc	Honda		IOM -	NED; 8	BEL -	GER; NC	ULS; 3	NAT; 2							10	4th	0
1960	500cc	Norton	FRA -	IOM -	NED -	BEL; 5	GER -	ULS; 5	NAT; 6							5	9th	0
1961	125cc	Honda	ESP; 3	GER; 7	FRA; 3	IOM; 4	NED; 2	BEL; 3	DDR; 6	ULS; 4	NAT; 5	SWE; 3	ARG; 2			28	4th	0
1961	250cc	Honda	ESP; 4	GER; 2	FRA; 6	IOM; 3	NED; 3	BEL; 1	DDR; 2	ULS; 3	NAT; 1	SWE; 4	ARG; 3			36	3rd	2
1962	125cc	Honda	ESP; 2	FRA; 2	IOM; 5	NED; 2	BEL; 2	GER; 10	ULS; 3	DDR; 2	NAT; 4	FIN; 1	ARG -			38	2nd	1
1962	250cc	Honda	ESP; 1	FRA; 1	IOM; 2	NED; 1	BEL; 2	GER; 1	ULS; 2	DDR; 1	NAT; 1		ARG -			48	1st	6
1962	350cc	Honda			IOM -	NED; 1			ULS; 1	DDR; 1	NAT; 1	FIN; 2				32	1st	4
1963	125cc	Honda	ESP; 2	GER; NC	FRA; 2	IOM; 6	NED; NC	BEL; 2	ULS; 7	DDR; 5	NAT; 2	FIN -	ARG; 1	JPN; 2		33	3rd	1
1963	250cc	Honda	ESP; 2	GER; 3		IOM; 1	NED; 1	BEL -	ULS; 1	DDR; 3	NAT; 2		ARG; 2	JPN; 1		44	1st	4
1963	350cc	Honda		GER; 1	IOM; 1		NED; 1		ULS; 1	DDR; 3	NAT; 1	FIN; 2		JPN; 1†		32	1st	5
1964	125cc	Honda	USA -	ESP; 2	FRA; NC	IOM; 2	NED; 1		GER; 1	DDR; 3	ULS; NC	FIN; 3	NAT; 6	JPN -		36	2nd	2
1964	250cc	Honda	USA -	ESP; 2	FRA; NC	IOM; 1	NED; 1	BEL; 2	GER; 2	DDR; 2	ULS; 2		NAT; 3	JPN; 1		42	2nd	3
1964	350cc	Honda				IOM; 1	NED; 1		GER; 1	DDR; 1	ULS; 1	FIN; 1	NAT; 1	JPN; 1		40	1st	8
1965	125cc	Honda	USA -	GER -	ESP -	FRA -	IOM -	NED -		DDR -	CZE -	ULS -	FIN -	NAT -	JPN; NC	0	–	0
1965	250cc	Honda	USA -	GER -	ESP -	FRA; NC	IOM; 1	NED; 2	BEL; 1	DDR; 1	CZE; 3	ULS -	FIN -	NAT -	JPN -	34	3rd	3
1965	350cc	Honda		GER; NC			IOM; 1	NED; 1		DDR; 1	CZE; 1	ULS; NC	FIN -	NAT -	JPN; 2	38	1st	4
1966	250cc	Honda	ESP; NC	GER; 2	FRA; 2	NED; 3	BEL; 3	DDR -	CZE -	FIN -	ULS -	IOM -	NAT -	JPN -		20	3rd	0
1966	350cc	Honda		GER -	FRA; 3	NED -		DDR -	CZE -	FIN -	ULS -	IOM -	NAT -	JPN -		4	15th	0
1966	500cc	Honda		GER; 1		NED; 1	BEL; NC	DDR -	CZE -	FIN -	ULS -	IOM -	NAT -			16	5th	2

† The 1963 350cc Japanese Grand Prix was a non-championship event.
