= Dan Shorey =

British motorcycle racer

- Nationality: British
Motorcycle racing career statistics
Grand Prix motorcycle racing
Active years	1961 – 1963, 1965, 1967 – 1969
First race	1961 250cc Spanish Grand Prix
Last race	1969 500cc Czechoslovakian Grand Prix
Starts / Wins / Podiums / Poles / F. laps / Points; 19 / 0 / 1 / 0 / 0 / 41

Dan Shorey was an English former Grand Prix motorcycle road racer.

Shorey was the son of a Banbury, England motorcycle garage owner. His best season was in 1968 when he finished the year in ninth place in the 500cc world championship. In 1958, Shorey teamed with Mike Hailwood to win the Thruxton 500 endurance race.
