= Tommy Robb (motorcyclist) =

Northern Irish motorcycle racer (1934–2024)

- Nationality: Northern Ireland
- Born: 14 October 1934; Belfast, Northern Ireland
- Died: 12 December 2024 (aged 90)
Motorcycle racing career statistics
Grand Prix motorcycle racing
Active years	1957 - 1959, 1961 - 1973
First race	1957 250cc Ulster Grand Prix
Last race	1973 125cc Isle of Man TT
First win	1962 250cc Ulster Grand Prix
Last win	1973 125cc Isle of Man TT
Team	Honda
Starts / Wins / Podiums / Poles / F. laps / Points; 88 / 3 / 28 / 0 / 2 / 368

Tommy Robb (14 October 1934 – 12 December 2024) was a Grand Prix motorcycle road racer from Northern Ireland.

Robb began riding in trials and scrambles during 1950. His first event was a road time-trial riding a 197 cc James. He then competed on Irish grasstracks, winning six national titles and a 25-mile sand race between 1954 and 1956, before turning to short circuits on tarmac and road-racing. His first road race was at Lurgan Park, outside of Belfast, in 1957 riding a 197 HJH. He was noticed by Belfast sponsor Terry Hill, himself a trials rider, who provided a 173 MV and a 250 cc NSU Sportmax for 1957 and 1958 with Robb finishing third in the 1957 Ulster Grand Prix and second in the 1958 race.

Robb was then sponsored by tuners Geoff Monty and his business partner Allen Dudley-Ward until joining the works Honda team from 1962, winning his first world championship race in the 1962 250 class at the Ulster Grand Prix with two further wins at the inaugural Japanese Grand Prix in Tokyo.

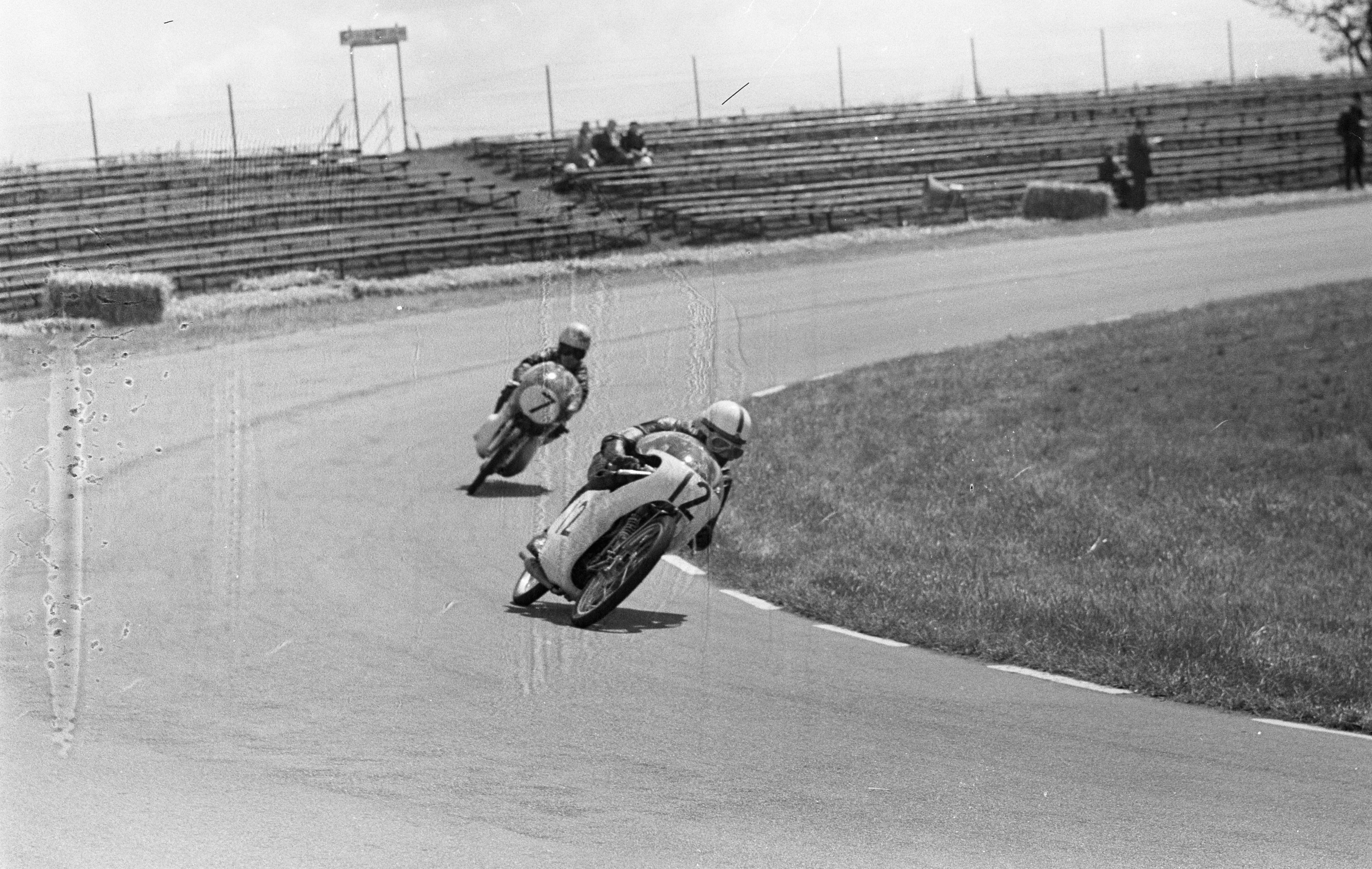
Robb during practice for the 1962 Dutch TT

In the 1962 season, Robb became one of the first non-Japanese riders hired by the Honda factory racing team. He enjoyed his greatest success with Honda, finishing second to his teammate, Jim Redman, in the 1962 350 world championship.

In 1973, Robb won the Lightweight 125 TT at the Isle of Man TT races, aboard a Yamaha. He was also a five-time winner of the North West 200 race in Northern Ireland.

Towards the end of his competitive riding, Robb established a road-race school in conjunction with former Motor Cycle magazine journalist and retail motorcycle shop owner David Dixon, using Yoshimura-equipped CB250, and CB450 Hondas, with Dixon being the UK importer and distributor of Yoshimura tuning equipment.

Robb died on 12 December 2024, at the age of 90.

== Trivia ==
In 1964, Robb's daughter Corienne won the annual Miss Pears competition.
