= BSA/Triumph racing triples =

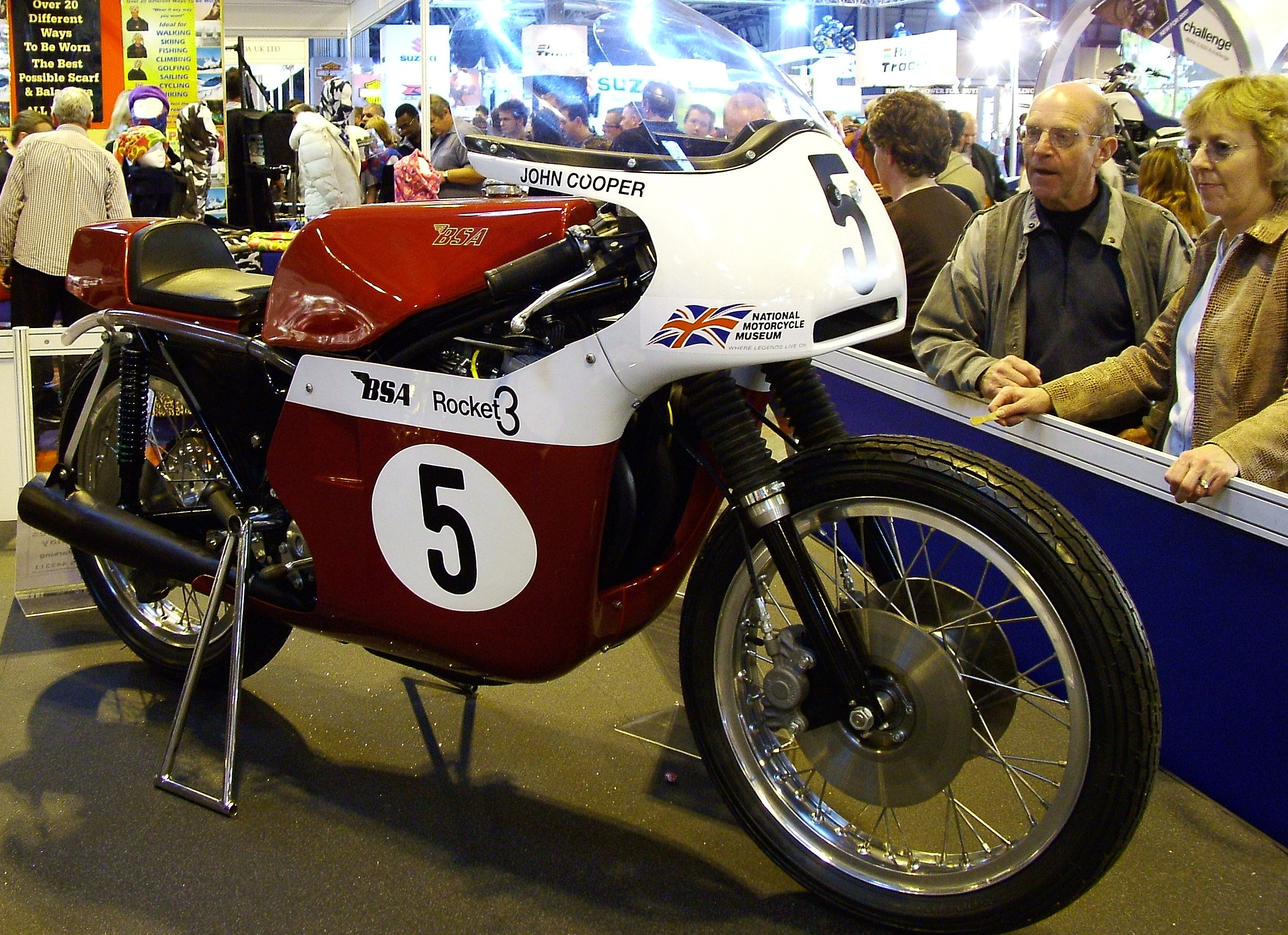
- John Cooper's 1971 BSA
- Manufacturer: BSA/Triumph
- Production: 1969-1974
- Assembly: Meriden, West Midlands, England
- Class: Racing motorcycle
- Engine: Air-cooled 750 cubic centimetres (46 cu in) OHV triple
- Bore / stroke: 68 mm × 70 mm
- Compression ratio: 11:1 or 12.5:1
- Power: 81 bhp (60 kW)-85 bhp (63 kW) @ 8,200 rpm
- Transmission: 5-speed gearbox, chain drive
- Frame type: Full duplex cradle
- Suspension: Telescopic forks, swinging arm

The BSA/Triumph racing triples were three cylinder 750 cc racing motorcycles manufactured by BSA/Triumph and raced with factory support from 1969 to 1974. There were road racing, production racing, endurance racing and flat track variants. The machines were based on the road-going BSA Rocket 3/Triumph Trident.

BSA/Triumph reputedly had a $2 million racing budget for 1970/1.

== Background ==
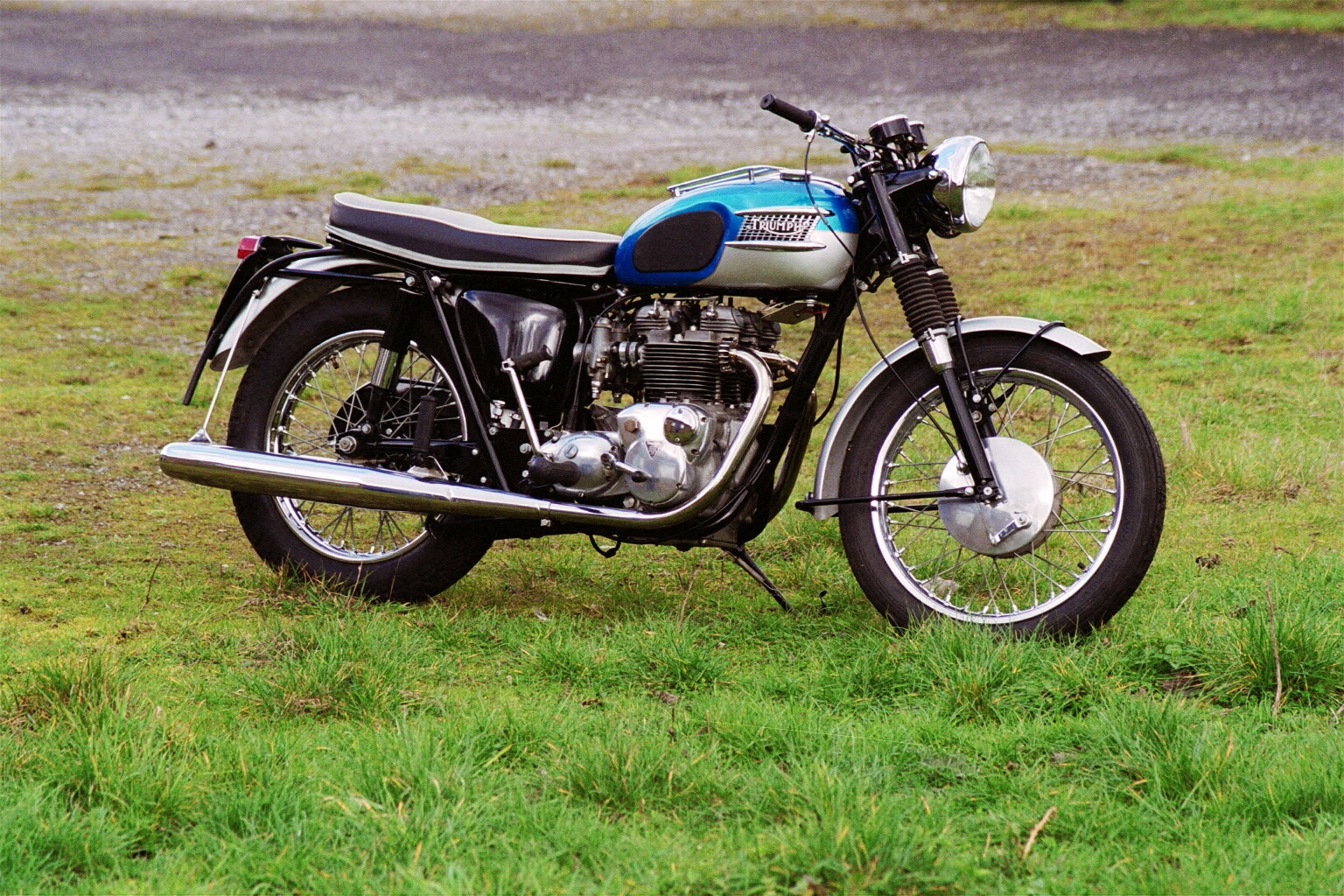
Prototype Triumph Trident P1, which was on display at the London Motorcycle Museum

The Triumph Trident was designed by Bert Hopwood and Doug Hele. The Trident's three-cylinder design was developed from Triumph's 1959 5TA unit-construction 500 cc parallel-twin (which had origins in Edward Turner's 1937 Triumph Speed Twin). The Trident has an extra cylinder and, following Triumph practice, its OHV pushrod engine has separate camshafts for the inlet and exhaust valves. Although the prototype was ready by 1965, the factory delayed for years for a cosmetic redesign and designing a BSA version which meant that its eventually introduction in 1968 was overshadowed by the apparently more modern Honda CB750, introduced in 1969.

== Development ==
Triumph had a history of road racing (the BSA factory had concentrated their competition participation on scrambles). A "race kit" was developed. Development rider Percy Tait tested a machine using the kit during the early part of 1969 and the Trident entered its first race in July in the International Hutchinson 100 at Brands Hatch, where Tait finished 6th.

Since 1933 the AMA had limited engines for Class C racing to 500 cc ohv engines and 750 cc side-valve engines. This had suited Harley Davidson well with their side-valve 750cc K-series V-twins. The AMA raised the limit for ohv engines to 750 cc for 1969 in the flat track class. BSA/Triumph supplied a few triple based flat trackers to selected riders to use on mile circuits, but the triples were too wide and heavy and the riders soon reverted to using twins.

In September 1969 the AMA announced 750 cc ohv machines would be allowed to compete in Class C road races. Triumph's chief development engineer, Doug Hele, suggested the factory should switch its emphasis from production racing to the new F750 open class that was being suggested. Acting on his suggestion, BSA-Triumph announced it would develop its 750 cc Rocket III and Trident triples for this series. The factory worked against the clock to get machines ready for the 1970 Daytona race. Development of the road racers was under the leadership of Doug Hele. Lucas and Dunlop were also involved in the development. Rob North built the frames. The engines were fitted with 11:1 pistons, a lightened crankshaft, the head was gas-flowed and breathed though three 1 3/16" Amal GP carburettors. Fontana 250 mm (9.8 in) double-sided front drum brakes were fitted. The engine had sheet metal shrouds fitted to guide the air within the fairing over the engine. Fairings for the racers were developed in the wind tunnel of the Royal Aircraft establishment.

The racing machines used a Rod Quaife 5 speed gearbox, although BSA brought the rights to produce the gearboxes themselves in 1970.

Work on the racers was undertaken by Triumph's Experimental Department at Meriden, and by 1971 the department had effectively become a race shop for both the BSA and Triumph triples.

At Percy Tait's suggestion, Rob North had built a new frame for the triples for 1971 changing the steering head angle by 2 degrees to 28 degrees. Shorter forks were fitted, the engine moved forwards and upwards by 40 mm to put more load on the front wheel and increase ground clearance. This shortened the wheel base and a longer swing arm fitted to compensate. This was known as the lowboy frame. Twin disc brakes were fitted to the front wheel needing extra-wide (by another 1.25 inches (32 mm)) fork-yokes created in the race department. A new fairing was introduced with a letterbox slot to feed air to the repositioned oil cooler. The fairing was developed at the MIRA wind tunnel. A modified engine was produced that increased engine power to 84/85 bhp. Compression was raised to 12.5:1 and a squish band added. Rockers and conrods were revised for reliability. The carburettors were changed to Amal Concentrics.

By the 1973 season BSA/Triumph had become part of Norton Villiers Triumph, and the BSA brand had been dropped so only Triumph badged triples were used.

The American Triumph Importers ran a team for the 1974 season. Frames for these bikes were copies of the North frame made by Wenco in California. The American frame was made from thin gauge 4130 tubing and heli-arc welded, weighing 6 lb (2.7 kg) less than the brazed originals.

== Racing timeline ==
=== 1969 ===
The triple's racing debut was in May 1969 at an AMA flat track race at Nazareth, Pennsylvania. Gary Nixon used a Trident and Yvon Duhamel and Dave Aldana on Rocket 3s. Aldana won the amateur race and Nixon was second in the professional race. In August Jim Rice won the mile race at Sedalia, Missouri on a Rocket 3, the only dirt victory for the triple.

Development rider Percy Tait rode a Trident triple in its first road race in July in a production race during the International Hutchinson 100 at Brands Hatch and finished 6th.

Testing the prototype North framed racer at Elvington in October, Tait averaged 157 mph.

=== 1970 ===
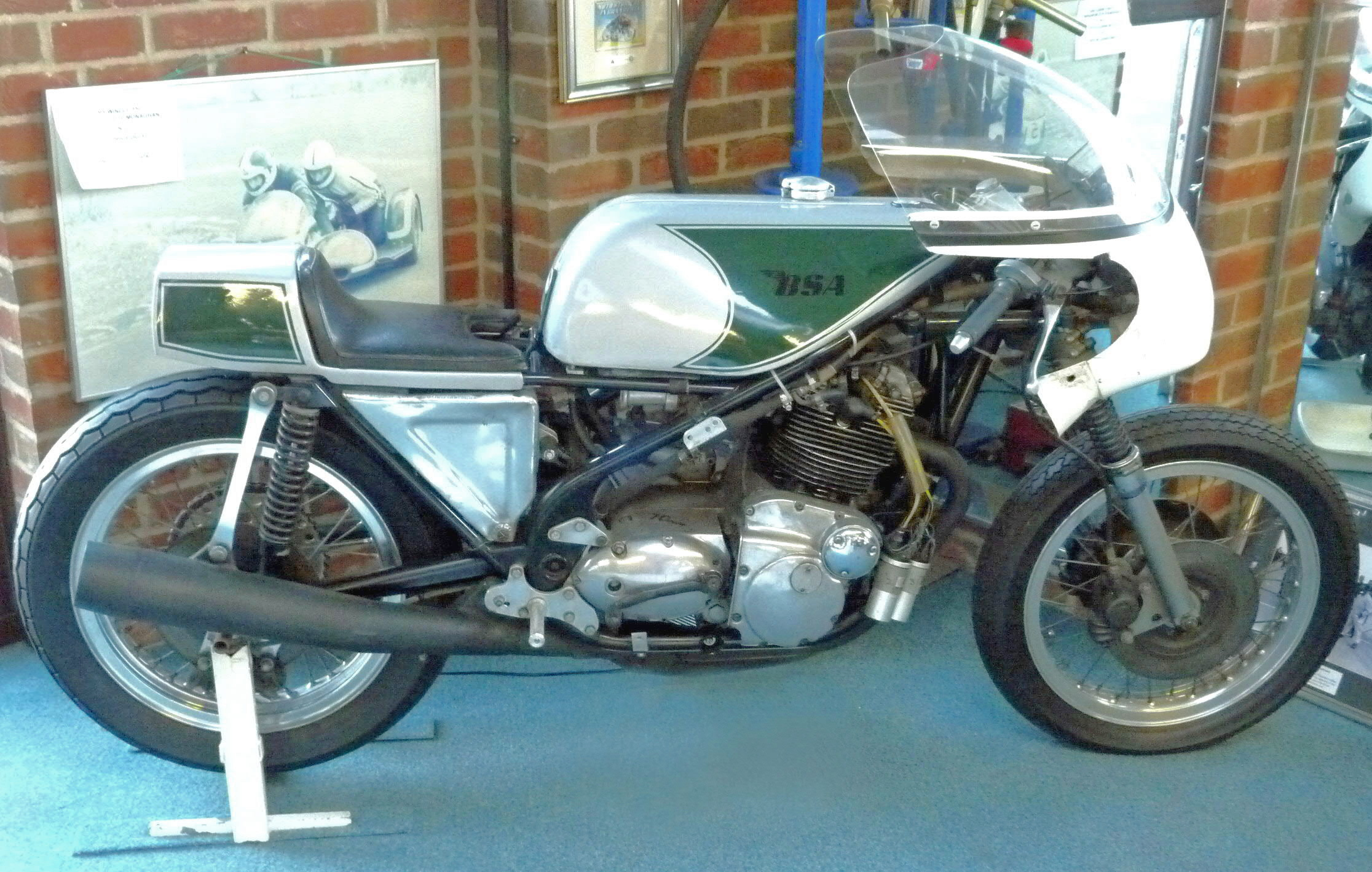
Rob North framed BSA Rocket 3 F750 class at the Sammy Miller Museum

For the AMA season opening Daytona 200, BSA/Triumph signed up Mike Hailwood, Dave Aldana, Jim Rice (BSA) and Gene Romero, Gary Nixon, Don Castro (Triumph). Percy Tait was to be an advisor but an extra bike was prepared for him to race on. Romero took pole but was beaten by three seconds by Dick Mann on a Honda in the race. Castro finished third.

Aldana won the road race at Talladega, Alabama and Nixon at the Loudon Classic. Rice used the triple on some mile flat tracks and his crash in qualifying for the Sacramento Mile was used in Bruce Brown's film On Any Sunday. Romero won the AMA Championship with Rice second.

Three production racing Tridents were prepared at Meriden for the IOM 750 Production TT. Malcolm Uphill won on one of these and Tom Dickie was fourth on another.

The TT tridents were taken to the September Bol d'Or at Montlhéry. The bike that won the TT was ridden by Tom Dickie and Paul Smart, and the 4th place TT machine ridden by Steve Jolly and Percy Tait. The third machine is given over to the French BSA/Triumph importer, Paris dealer CGCIM, and was ridden by Frenchmen Jean-Claude Costeux and George Passet. The Jolly/Tait machine was losing oil during the race, which was spraying on the rear wheel causing the machine to slip and slide. The riders wanted to retire the bike but were persuaded by the French importer to continue. Because of this the machine was nicknamed Slippery Sam. Dickie/Smart won the race, with Jolly/Tait 5th and the French machine 8th.

BSA's competitions department at Armoury Road prepared two production racing Rocket 3s. They competed at the IOM 750 Production TT, where works rider Bob Heath finished 5th. Graham Saunders and Don Jones rode one of the bikes at the Bol d'Or, but crashed during the night.

In a precursor to the Anglo-American Match Races Nixon and Yvon Duhamel were brought over to England for the 1970 Race of the year at Mallory Park. On a spare factory triumph Nixon finished 4th.

Smart & Ray Pickrell raced triples in South Africa over the winter of 1970. Also in the winter of 1970–71, the three production racers received new frames. Whilst looking identical to the standard frames, they had any unnecessary lugs removed and were significantly lighter. That combined with other modifications by mechanic Les Williams, made the bikes 70 lbs lighter than stock. The new frame also gave more ground clearance.

=== 1971 ===
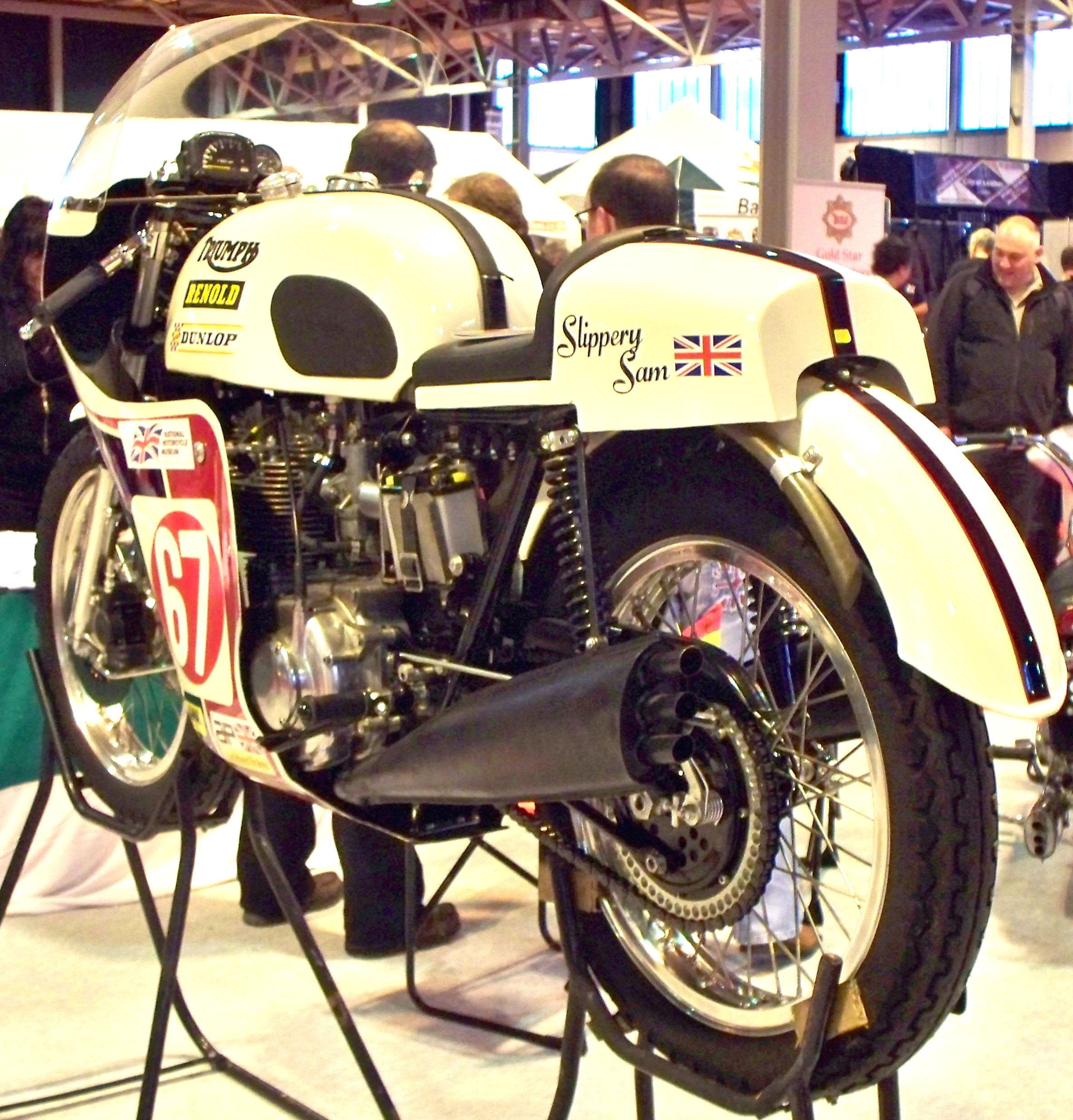
Slippery Sam

BSA/Triumph entered 10 riders for the Daytona 200: Mike Hailwood, Dick Mann, Jim Rice, Dave Aldana, Don Emde on BSAs and Paul Smart, Gene Romero, Gary Nixon, Don Castro, Tom Rockwell on Triumphs. Hailwood, Smart, Mann and Romero were on "low boy" machines and Smart's machine had the uprated engine. In the race, Hailwood retired with a broken valve and smart retired from the lead in the closing stages with a holed piston. Mann led Romero and Emde home for a BSA 1–2–3.

BSA/Triumph sponsored the inaugural Anglo-American Match Races, a match between American and British riders staged over the Easter weekend. Ray Pickrell won both races at Brands Hatch and the first race at Mallory Park. Smart won the second race at Mallory and both races at Oulton Park. Britain won the series 183 points to 137 points.

The MCN Superbike Championship was introduced in 1971 and was an open class for machines for motorcycles of 351cc upwards. It was at the time the premier British motorcycle championship. All six rounds were won by triples: Percy Tait (Brands, Mallory & Snetterton), Pickrell (Oulton and Mallory) and John Cooper (Brands). Tait won the championship, Pickrell was second and Cooper 4th.

Tait and Dave Croxford won the May Thruxton 500 on Slippery Sam.

In June, Tony Jefferies won the newly introduced 750 Isle of Man TT on a Triumph, with Pickrell on a BSA second. Pickrell rode Slippery Sam to the first of 5 consecutive 750 Production TT wins. Jefferies was second and Bob Heath (BSA) third.

Smart won the August Hutchinson 100 at Brands Hatch on a Trident. He also won the Silverstone round of the British 750 cc Championship later that month, and the championship that year.

New regulations allowed a different frame to be used at the September Bol d'Or at the Le Mans Bugatti Circuit. On a Rob North framed Trident, Tait and Croxford won, although the bike had been branded as a BSA. A second machine was made available for the French importer and was ridden by Gerard Debrock and Oliver Chevallier. The Italian Triumph importer, Bepi Koelliker, also requested a machine and they were lent Slippery Sam for the event. Repeated ignition problems dogged the bike and riders Vanni Blegi and Renato Galtrucco finished in 19th position.

Cooper (BSA) beat Giacomo Agostini on the works MV Agusta 500 at the September Race of the Year at Mallory Park. Pickrell (BSA) came 3rd. Doug Hele said of the race “This race must be rated as the greatest of all the victories we scored with the threes.” Cooper beat Agostini for a second time at the October Race of the South at Brands. The machine Cooper was riding was one of two uprated machines that produced 85 bhp and had a revised clutch that allowed the engine to be repositioned in the frame for better handling. The second machine, a Trident, was used by Smart and on which he had broken lap records at Silverstone, Snetterton and Oulton Park in late August.

Mann won the 1971 AMA No.1 plate on a BSA with Romero second for Triumph. At the final round at Ontario, California on the latest version of the triple, Nixon (Triumph) and Cooper (BSA) each won a 125-mile leg of the race. Cooper had used 9,500 rpm on the Rocket 3 (1,000 revs beyond the red-line) on the last lap to overtake Kel Carruthers on a Yamaha. Nixon was the overall winner of the race.

=== 1972 ===
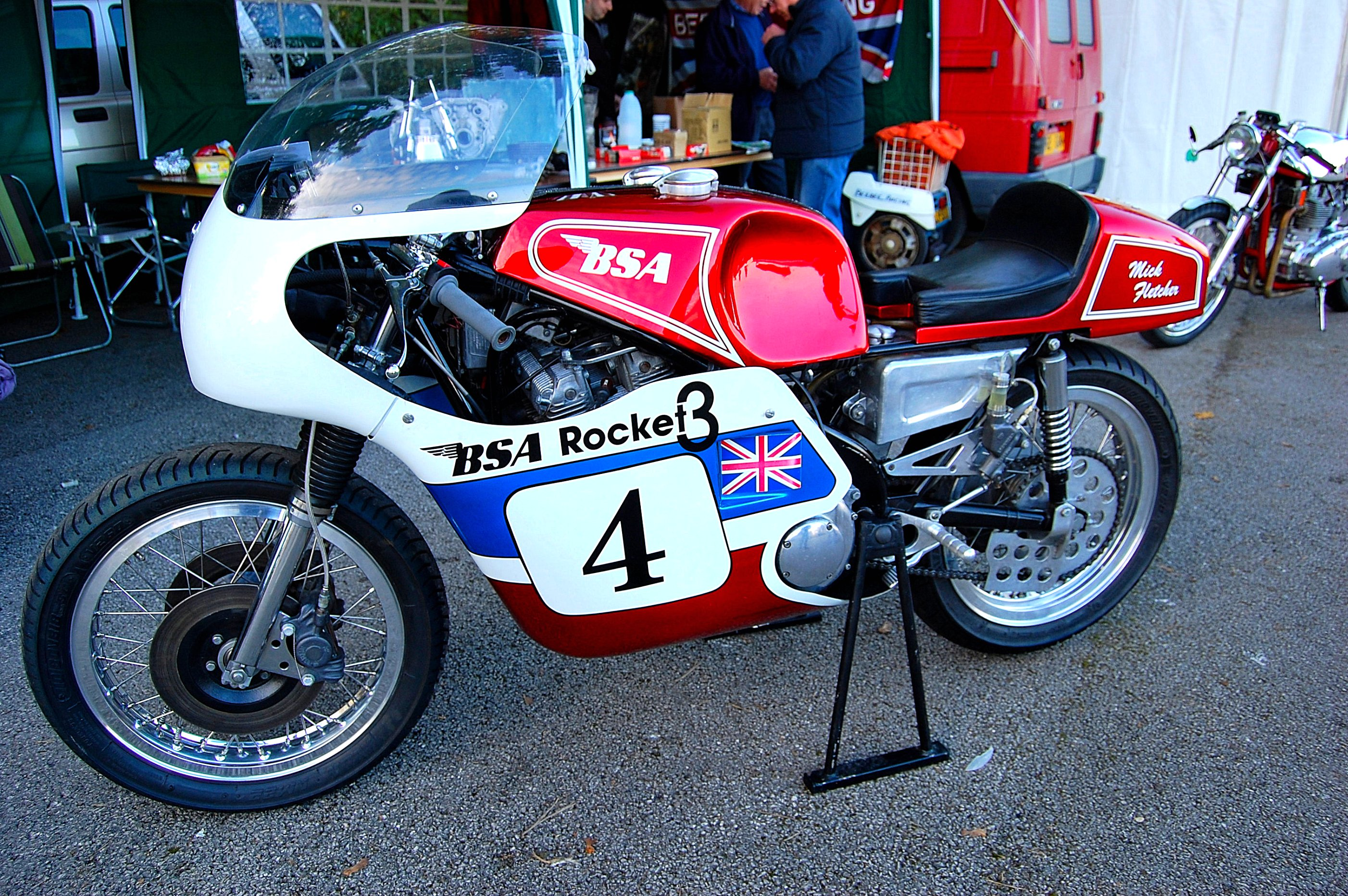
BSA Rocket 3 racer

In 1972 Gene Romero and Dick Mann were the only contracted riders for the American series, with Gary Scott receiving some sponsorship. At Daytona the triples were 10 mph slower than the 750 Suzukis, with Mann finishing 4th. The triples didn't win any of the AMA road races during the season.

Following budget cut-backs by BSA/Triumph, the Easter 1972 Transatlantic Trophy was no longer a one make series. Tony Jefferies and Ray Pickrell were mounted on Tridents with John Cooper and Mann on Rocket 3s. Pickrell won three races and was joint top-scorer with Cal Rayborn (Harley Davidson) who had won the other three races.

Six of the eight rounds of the 1972 MCN Superbike Championship were won by triples: 3 by Cooper, 2 by Pickrell and 1 by Paul Smart. Cooper won the championship with Pickrell second.

British dealers Boyer of Bromley entered a Seeley framed F750 racer in short circuit and endurance races in 1972 and 1973, including the 1972 Barcelona 200 ridden by Dave Nixon and Peter Butler. The machine was fitted with Boyer-Bransden electronic ignition.

Although the Factory was no longer supporting production racing, Hele allowed Les Williams to prepare Slippery Sam for the 750 Production race. Pickrell won the race at an average speed of 100.00 mph. with the Trident of David Nixon third. Pickrell also won the Formula 750 TT on a North framed Trident with Jefferies 2nd and David Nixon 4th.

=== 1973 ===
Dick Mann was the only rider to compete in the AMA series in 1973 on a triple. As the BSA brand was now defunct he was to ride a Trident but Mann preferred to use the BSA he had used the previous season. After some negotiation he used the BSA but it was repainted in Triumph colours. Two-strokes won all the AMA road races.

Tony Jefferies, Percy Tait and British team reserve Ron Chandler were mounted on factory Tridents for the Easter Transatlantic Trophy. Mick Grant was also in the British team on a Boyer of Bromley supported Trident.

In the 1973 MCN Superbike Championship, which was dominated by Suzuki, Tait finished 5th and Jefferies 10th on triples.

Slippery Sam was ridden by Jefferies at the 151 mile long Production TT which he won at an average speed of 95.62 mph. The other podium spots were fill by Tridents with John Williams in second and David Nixon in third.

A number of triples competed in the inaugural FIM Formula 750 Prize. Ron Chandler finished the championship 9th overall.

=== 1974 ===
Mike Kidd and Percy Tait raced at Daytona on Tridents but both retired during the race.

1974 saw Slippery Sam modified with twin discs on the front, two 6 volt batteries to save weight and was painted in the NVT colours of red, white and blue. Mick Grant rode the machine to his first TT win despite having his wrist in plaster following an earlier accident.

=== 1975 ===
The IOM Production TT had been extended to 10 laps and a rider change introduced. Dave Croxford and Alex George won the race on Slippery Sam. This would be the final TT for Slippery Sam as only bikes up to 5 years only were allowed to compete.
