= 1971 Anglo-American Match Races =

Anglo-American Match Races
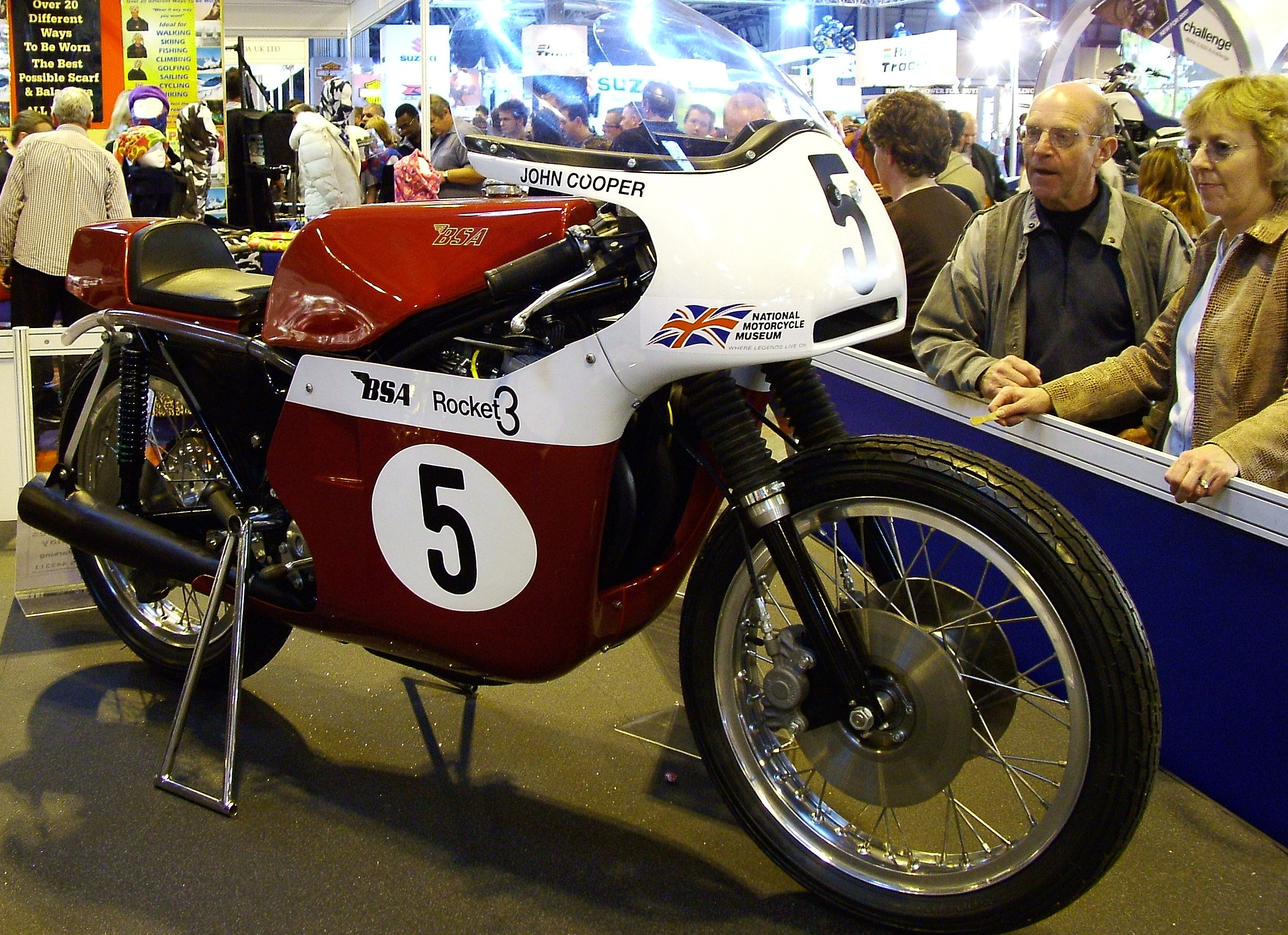
- British rider John Cooper's BSA
- Category: Motorcycle road races
- Country: UK
- Inaugural season: 1971
- Classes: AMA/F750
- Riders: Gary Nixon (United States); Jim Rice (United States); Dave Aldana (United States); Dick Mann (United States); Don Castro (United States); Don Emde (United States); Percy Tait (United Kingdom); John Cooper (United Kingdom); Paul Smart (United Kingdom); Ray Pickrell (United Kingdom); Tony Jefferies (United Kingdom)
- Manufacturers: BSA/Triumph

The 1971 Anglo-American Match Races was the inaugural running of the Anglo-American Match Races (renamed Transatlantic Trophy in 1972), an annual series of motorcycle races between the United Kingdom and America which were held from 1971 to 1988 and again in 1991. The match was held 9–12 April 1971 (Easter weekend) with rounds at Brands Hatch, Mallory Park and Oulton Park. The event was heavily sponsored by BSA/Triumph. They also supplied the 750 cc racing triples that the riders competed on. The motorcycles were to AMA/F750 specification. Most of the competitors were work BSA/Triumph works riders.

The UK won all the races and the series 183–137. Ray Pickrell and Paul Smart won three races each and were the top scorers.

== Background ==
British journalists, Gavin Trippe and Bruce Cox, ran California based Motor Cycle Weekly and promoted motorcycle races in the US. The pair were keen to promote American racers in the UK. They met with Chris Lowe of Motor Circuit Developments (MCD), who ran Brands Hatch, Oulton Park and Mallory Park circuits, and Jim Swift of the British Motorcycle Racing Club at the 1970 Daytona 200 and the plan for the Transatlantic Trophy was formulated. Ron Grant, the leader of the US Suzuki team supported the scheme. Lowe approached BSA/Triumph who agreed to supply 750 cc racing triples for the riders and to financially support the series out of their $2 million racing budget for 1970/71.

== Format ==
The event consisted of three rounds over the Easter weekend at different tracks: Brands Hatch (9 April - Good Friday), Mallory Park (11 April - Easter Sunday) and Oulton Park (12 April - Easter Monday) Each round consisted of two 12 lap races.

Each team consisted of 5 riders. The Americans had a squad of six riders team so not all riders could compete in every race. However, American captain Gary Nixon fell in practice two days before the first race and broke his wrist so was unable to ride in any of the races.

Points were awarded for each race, the winner receiving 10 points, 2nd place points etc. down to 1 point for 10th place. Prize money was also awarded for each race with the winner receiving £150 down to £15 for 10th place. A bonus of £50 was given to the rider who had set the fastest lap over the series. The total prize fund was £5,000.

== Teams ==
Teams
UK		USA	
Rider	Machine	Rider	Machine
Percy Tait (captain)	Triumph	Gary Nixon (captain)	Triumph
John Cooper	BSA	Jim Rice	BSA
Paul Smart	Triumph	Dave Aldana	BSA
Ray Pickrell	BSA	Dick Mann	BSA
Tony Jefferies	Triumph	Don Castro	Triumph
		Don Emde	BSA

=== America ===
Gene Romero, the current A.M.A. Grand National Champion and runner-up at the 1971 Daytona 200 was to have led the US team but withdrew.

- Gary Nixon, twice A.M.A. Grand National Champion, had raced in the UK before and finished 4th in the 1970 Mallory Park Race of the Year was appointed as the American captain.
- Jim Rice was runner up in the 1970 A.M.A. Grand National Championship.
- Dave Aldana was 3rd in the 1970 A.M.A. Grand National Championship
- Dick Mann, the oldest member of the American team, was double winner of the Daytona 200, on a Honda in 1970 and on a BSA in 1971, former A.M.A. Grand National Champion and 4th in the 1970 A.M.A. Grand National Championship.
- Don Castro was 5th in the 1970 A.M.A. Grand National Championship.
- Don Emde finished 3rd at Daytona in 1971.

=== Britain ===
The home team had the advantage of knowing the tracks that were to be used and also in the nature of the circuits. The American riders were more used to dirt tracks, ovals and road races.

- Percy Tait, oldest member of the British team at 42 and team captain. Tait had been a Triumph works racer and development since the early 1960s. He had competed in the 1967 to 1970 500 cc world championships and won the Thruxton 500 endurance race in 1967 and again in 1969.
- John "Mooneyes" Cooper was a known as the "Master of Mallory", where he had won many races including the Race of the Year in 1965 and 1970.
- Paul Smart led the 1971 Daytona race by 26 seconds until his engine blew in the closing stages. He won the 1970 Bol d'Or co-riding with Tom Dickie on a triple.
- Ray Pickrell had previously ridden Norton Motorcycle Companys sponsored and prepared by Paul Dunstall, on which he had won 17 races including the 1968 750 Production TT. He had changed for the Triumph team for 1971.
- Tony Jefferies, a newcomer to the Triumph team.

== Motorcycles ==
In September 1969 Triumph's chief development engineer, Doug Hele, suggested the factory should switch its emphasis from production racing to the new F750 open class that was being suggested. Acting on his suggestion, BSA-Triumph announced it would develop its 750cc Rocket III and Trident triples for this series. The factory worked against the clock to get machines ready for the 1970 Daytona race. The factory failed to get results in Daytona due to unreliability.

The factory had entered 10 riders for the 1971 Daytona race. A new specification machine had been developed. At Percy Tait's suggestion Rob North had built a new frame for the triples changing the steering head angle by 2 degrees to 28 degrees. Shorter forks were fitted, the engine moved forwards and upwards by 40 mm to put more load on the front wheel and increase ground clearance. This shortened the wheel base and a longer swing arm fitted to compensate. This was known as the lowboy frame. The engines were also modified to produce slightly more power. Disc brakes were fitted to the front wheel. Only four of the new machines were available which were allocated to Gene Romero, Paul Smart, Dick Mann and Mike Hailwood. Mann won the race with BSA/Triumph taking the top three places.

The machines were airfreighted in from Daytona and Smart and Hailwood's bikes converted to short-circuit specification.

Smart used his Daytona bike for the matches, Ray Pickrell used Hailwood's Daytona machine and the other three members of the British team had new "lowboy" machines. Mann used his lowboy Daytona machine and Gary Nixon Romero's machine. The rest of the American team used the older spec machines, although, with the exception of Jim Rice's machine, they had been fitted with disc brakes. All the American machines were fitted with the larger Daytona tank and seat.

The disparity between the two teams' bikes led to claims that the Americans were disadvantaged. Don Emde is quoted as saying “We got beaten so badly that it was close to an ambush situation, but we gave it a good shot, and if we had all been on the same bikes as Pickrell, Smart and Cooper, it would have been closer."

== Races ==
=== Brands Hatch ===
Brands Hatch circuit

Race 1

The race started on a damp but drying track. Pickrell took the lead from the start and led the whole race. Smart had a slow start as he was still adjusting his helmet when the flag dropped, but recovered to take second place. Mann was the highest placed American in third place. Cooper seemed to be struggling, possible due to a recent injury, and finished last.

Race 2

Pickrell soon took the lead and maintained it to the finish, equalling Phil Read's lap record in the process. Smart was again second. Americans Castro and Mann finished third and fourth.

Britain lead the Americans 61–49 after the first round.

=== Mallory Park ===
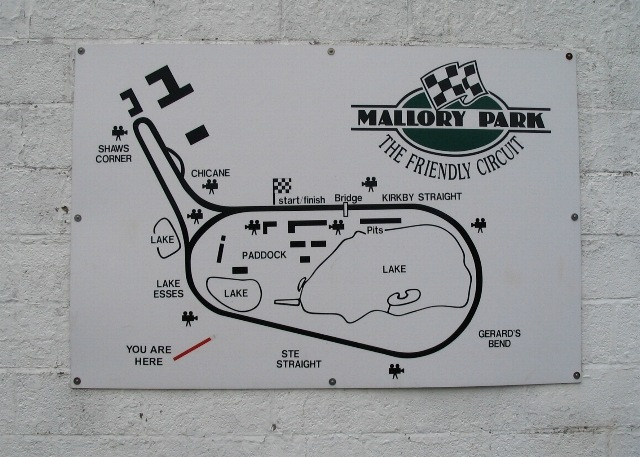
Mallory Park circuit

Race 1

Castro took the lead from the start but slid on oil and several riders passed him. Tait slid off at the hairpin and a lap later Smart did the same, breaking a finger. Castro retired with a broken conrod. Pickrell made it a hat-trick of wins, with Cooper, who had recovered some form, second. Mann finished third and Jefferies fourth.

Race 2

Jefferies had wrecked his bike whilst taking part in the "Unlimited" race that was also on the programme, so only 9 riders took the start for the second match race. Tait retired with engine problems giving Smart the win and Pickerell second. Cooper finished third and equalled the Hailwood's lap record that had been set on a works Honda RC166 six.

Britain beat the Americans 53–48 in the second round.

=== Oulton Park ===
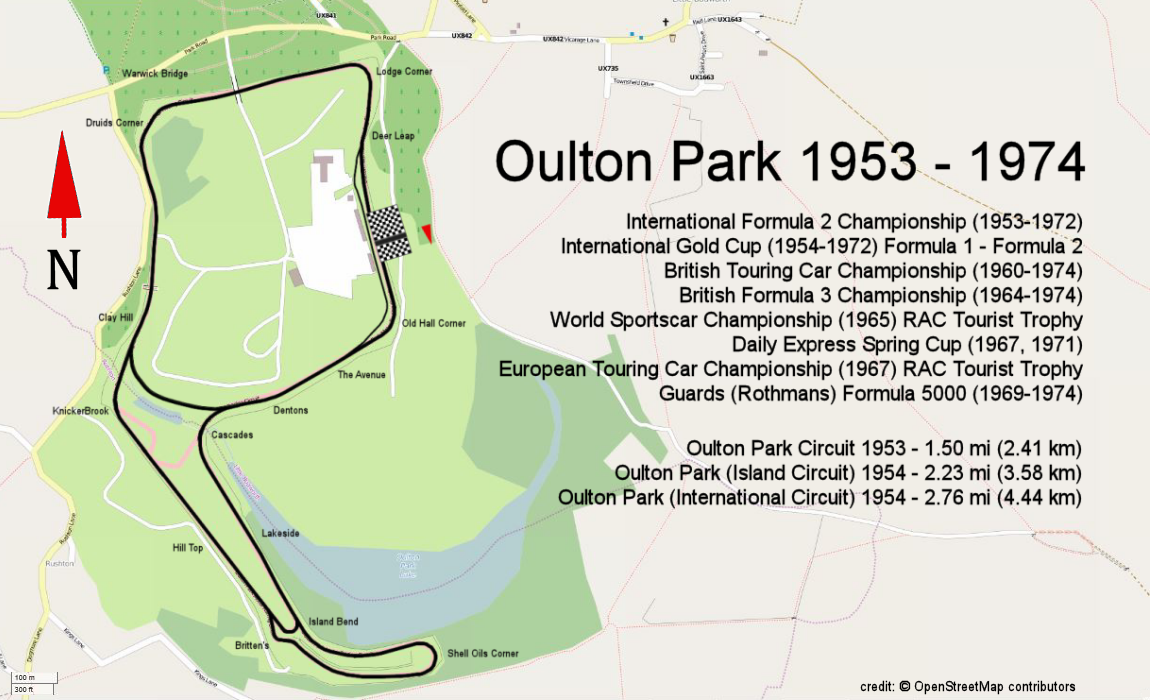
Oulton Park circuit

Race 1

Emde and Castro got good starts and led the pack away only to be passed by Smart by the end of the first lap. As the race progressed Pickrell, Cooper and Mann passed the pair. Castro fell off on the last lap but remounted and finished last.

Race 2

Mann took the lead from the start but was passed by Smart on lap 2. Mann defended successfully against Cooper and Pickrell to retain second place. Pickrell came off in the closing stages of the race.

Britain beat the Americans 69–40 in the third round.

=== Results ===
Britain won all three rounds and the series 183 points to 137 points. Ray Pickrell and Paul Smart won three races each and were joint top individual scorers with American Dick Mann third.

Individual Scores
Rider		Points
1	Ray Pickrell	48
1	Paul Smart	48
3	Dick Mann	46

Results
Brands Hatch				Mallory Park				Oulton Park			
Race 1		Race 2		Race 1		Race 2		Race 1		Race 2	
1	Ray Pickrell	1	Ray Pickrell	1	Ray Pickrell	1	Paul Smart	1	Paul Smart	1	Paul Smart
2	Paul Smart	2	Paul Smart	2	John Cooper	2	Ray Pickrell	2	Ray Pickrell	2	Dick Mann
3	Dick Mann	3	Don Castro	3	Dick Mann	3	John Cooper	3	John Cooper	3	John Cooper
Fastest lap: Ray Pickrell; 56.2s/79.43 mph		Fastest lap: Dick Mann; 58.3s/76.70 mph		Fastest lap: R Pickrell & P Smart; 53.6s/90.67 mph		Fastest lap: John Cooper; 52.0s/93.46 mph		Fastest lap: Paul Smart; 1m 42.3s/92.76 mph		Fastest lap: Paul Smart; 1m 48.2s/91.80 mph	

== Bibliography ==
- Brooke, Lindsay (2002). Triumph : A Century of Passion and Power. MotorBooks International. ISBN 978-1-61059-227-7.
- Cardoso, Luís (3 August 2019). "Transatlantic Trophy". motospotnews (in Portuguese).
- Cox, Bruce (18 October 2016). "The Anglo-american match races". Classic Racer – via www.pressreader.com.
- Harmon, Paul (20 June 2019). "The BSA/Triumph Racing Triples". retromotoplanet.com. Archived from the original on 2 August 2021.
- Jones, Brad (2014). BSA motorcycles : the final evolution. Poundbury [England]: Veloce Publishing Ltd. ISBN 978-1-84584-647-3.
- Maddox, Roy (2019). Triumph Trident : the best production racer ever. Stroud: Amberley Publishing Limited. ISBN 978-1-4456-7852-8.
- Miller, Robin (26 November 2019). "Brands Hatch supremo Chris Lowe has died". BikeSport.
- Noyes, Dennis (1999). Motocourse : 50 years of Moto Grand Prix : the official history of the FIM Road Racing World Championship Grand Prix. Richmond: Hazleton. ISBN 978-1-874557-83-8.
- Paskins, Wilf (March 2001). "Southampton and District Motor Cycle Club - History" (PDF). Southampton and District Motor Cycle Club.
- Swift, Jim (1976). Ride it! : the complete book of big bike racing. Yeovil: Foulis. ISBN 978-0-85429-220-2.
