= Don Castro =

American motorcycle racer

- Born: December 28, 1949 (age 76); Hollister, California
- Occupation: Motorcycle racer

Don Castro (born December 28, 1949) is an American former professional motorcycle racer who is an inductee of the AMA Motorcycle Hall of Fame. During his career he was a works rider for Triumph and Yamaha' and a privateer on Triumph, Montesa, Yamaha, and Kawasaki machines.

Castro's life was the subject of the 1990 film Learning Curve.

== Early life ==
Castro was born in Hollister, California on December 28, 1949. As a teenager he was often in trouble for racing around Hollister on his Honda 90cc motorcycle. His father brought him a Triumph 500cc motorcycle on the condition that he would only ride on tracks and not on the road.

On the Triumph, Castro won the first race, a dirt race, that he entered. Whilst he was still 16, he entered a race at Chowchilla Fairgrounds but was thrown of the bike in the race and run-over by other competitors. He broke his sternum, ribs, leg, ankle and an arm. His recovery took six months and during this time he had doubts about motorcycle racing.

== Racing career ==
Castro moved up to Expert Sportsman class in 967 and turned pro novice in 1968 Moving up to the Junior category in 1969, Castro was doing well until he broke his ankle playing football with Gary Nixon and Dick Mann at the Triumph factory which side lined him for four nationals. In his rookie year, Castro won seven Junior Nationals and came second to Dave Aldana for the Junior of the Year title. This prompted Triumph racing boss Pete Coleman to sign Castro for a factory ride in 1970.

Starting in the Expert category in 1970, Castro rode for Triumph in both dirt and road racing events. In the first rode race he had competed in, the Daytona 200, Castro finished third on a 750 cc racing triple. He finished his rookie season in fifth place. Castro and his BSA/Triumph teammates David Aldana and Gene Romero were known as Team Mexican, a tongue-in-cheek reference to their Hispanic roots.

In 1971, Castro was a member of the American team that participated in the 1971 Anglo-American Match Races. He finished ninth in the AMA standings that year. Triumph's road bike sales were suffering with the introduction of superior Japanese machines and the factory cut back its racing budget. Castro and Gary Nixon were cut from the race team at the end of the season.

Riding as a privateer in 1972, Castro started competing on Triumph and Montesa machines until his van and the race bikes were stolen on his way to a race at Houston Astrodome. He contacted K&N, who lent him a spare Yamaha and he rode for their them for the rest of the season. Although he had his race bikes stolen, he did have a Red Line framed 750 cc Triumph twin in his garage. With the help of Tracy Nelson of The Fiberglas Works in Santa Cruz, California, Castro converted the bike into a streamlined dirt racer. The combined seat, tank and side number plates lowered the centre of gravity of the bike and allowed Castro to lay lower on the machine along the straights. The first outing of the machine was at the Race of Champions. Although Castro was ineligible to ride in the champions race, he won all the support races he entered. The AMA then outlawed the bike.

Yamaha offered Castro a ride in 1973 and on one of their motorcycles he won the San Jose half-mile. He finished fifth in the championship that season.

Continuing with Yamaha in 1974, Castro won the 250 cc Daytona race, beating his teammate and race favourite Kenny Roberts. Straight after Daytona Castro took part in a Cal Rayborn benefit race (Rayborn had been killed whilst racing in New Zealand in December 1973). During the race, he fell and his leg got tangled with the bike. Castro refused to go to hospital, but the next day he did and was diagnosed with a detached kneecap and ligaments. This put him out of racing for several months, including the Transatlantic Trophy races he was due to compete in.

In 1975, Yamaha ended their factory racing so Castro rode on Kawasakis tuned by Erv Kanemoto. The Kawasaki was fast but unreliable, and Castro finished the season in ninth place.

Castro retired from racing in 1976 and opened a motorcycle and ATV service centre in Tres Pinos, California, although he came out of retirement for the annual BMW Battle of the Legends from 1993 - 1996. He was inducted into the AMA Motorcycle Hall of Fame in 2010.
