= Transatlantic Trophy =

20th-century motorcycle races

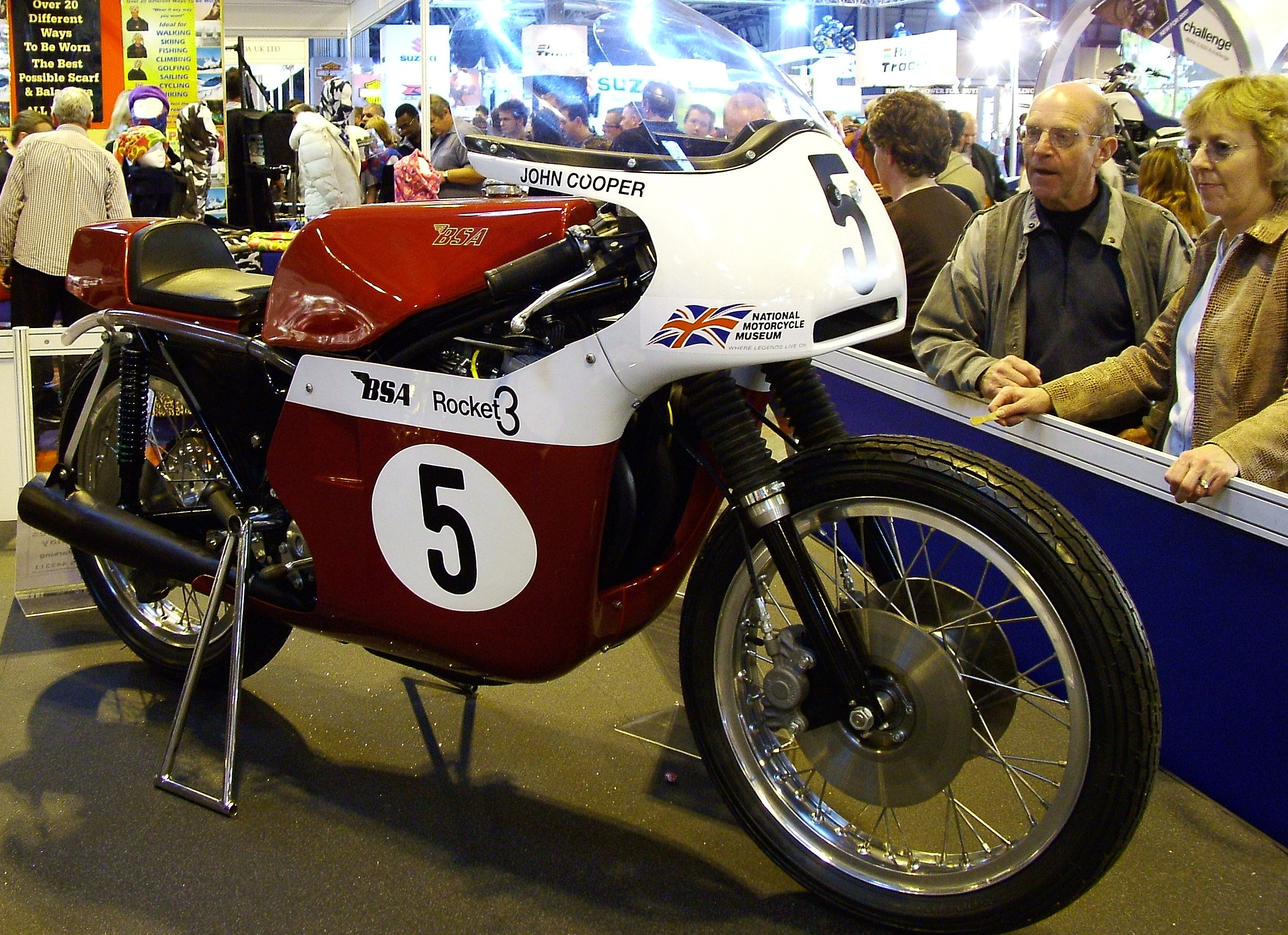
- British rider John Cooper's 1971 BSA
- Category: Motorcycle racing
- Country: UK
- Inaugural season: 1971
- Folded: 1991

The Transatlantic Trophy (initially called Anglo-American Match Races) was an annual series of motorcycle races between the United Kingdom and America held from 1971 to 1988 and again in 1991.

They were mostly held over the Easter weekend at Brands Hatch, Mallory Park and Oulton Park, although some races were held at Donington Park and Snetterton. Three different specifications of motorcycles were used in the series at various times: AMA/F750, Superbike and GP.

== History ==
British journalists, Gavin Trippe and Bruce Cox, ran California based Motor Cycle Weekly and promoted motorcycle races in the US. The pair were keen to promote American racers in the UK. They met with Chris Lowe of Motor Circuit Developments (MCD), who ran Brands Hatch, Oulton Park and Mallory Park circuits, and Jim Swift of the British Motorcycle Racing Club at the 1970 Daytona 200 and the plan for the Transatlantic Trophy was formulated. Ron Grant, the leader of the US Suzuki team supported the scheme. Lowe approached BSA/Triumph who agreed to supply 750 cc racing triples for the riders and to support the series.

BSA/Triumph withdrew after the 1971 event and John Player became the title sponsor from 1972. The name of the series was changed to Transatlantic Trophy in the same year.

The initial format was 2 races at each of the three tracks over the Easter weekend: Brands Hatch (Good Friday), Mallory Park (Easter Sunday) and Oulton Park (Easter Monday). Marlboro became the title sponsor in 1979. Motor Circuit Developments sold Mallory Park in late 1982, and for 1983 Snetterton Circuit was used as the third circuit. To fit in with Snetterton's schedule the races were moved to May Day weekend. There were allegations of financial irregularities by Motor Circuit Developments, in late 1983. Tom Wheatcroft, owner of Donington Park, stepped in and the entire series was staged at Donington Park from 1984. There was no title sponsor for 1984 but Shell Oils sponsored the series from 1985 to 1987. Brands Hatch returned as a venue in 1987, with 3 races at brands and six at Donington.

Donington was to host the inaugural round of the Superbike World Championship on Easter Sunday 1988. For the mutual benefit of both WSB and the Transatlantic Match (which both used similar specification machines) the Transatlanic series was expanded to four teams and renamed the Eurolantic Challenge as it included European riders. No matches were held in 1989 and 1990. The final match, known as the Transatlantic Superbike Challenge that year, was held at Brands Hatch and Mallory Park in May 1991.

In 1984 Honda works rider Freddie Spencer crashed and broke bones in his feet. This caused him to miss the Spanish GP. Team mate Ron Haslam had also crashed. Honda withdrew its support for the non-championship event. Other manufactures followed suit over the next few years. Without the top riders the series declined and was cancelled after the 1991 matches.

== Results ==
Winners
Anglo-American Match Races
Year	Team	Results	Team
1971	UK	183-137	USA
Transatlantic Trophy
Year	Team	Results	Team
1972	UK	252-210	USA
1973	UK	416-398	USA
1974	UK	416-401	USA
1975	UK	242-279	USA
1976	UK	412-384	USA
1977	UK	380-405	USA
1978	UK	435-379	USA
1979	UK	352-448	USA
1980	UK	370-442	USA
1981	UK	466-345	USA
1982	UK	491-313	USA
1983	UK	245-198	USA
1984	British Commonwealth	136-259	USA
1985	UK	336-254	USA
1986	UK	314-214	USA
1987	UK	745.5-993.5	USA
Eurolantic Challenge
Year	Team	Results	Team
1988	UK 1	586-570	USA
1988	UK 2	281-287	Europe
Transatlantic Superbike Challenge
Year	Team	Results	Team
1991	UK	625-161	USA
Winning teams in green.

== Matches ==
=== 1971 ===
The inaugural Anglo-American Match Races event matched a 5 man British team with a 6 man American team, although only 5 Americans could race in any one race. American captain Gary Nixon fell in practice for the first race and broke his wrist so was unable to ride in any of the races. All riders were on BSA/Triumph 750 cc triples.

BSA/Triumph had updated the racing triples for the 1971 Daytona 200, which BSA works rider Dick Mann had won. The changes included the compact "lowboy" frame, which was lower and lighter but had more ground clearance. Disc brakes had been fitted and the engines produced slightly more power. There were only a limited number of 1971 machines available. The British team plus Mann and Nixon received the upgraded machines. The rest of the American team used 1970 machines. This led to claims that the American team was disadvantaged.

The UK won all races and the series 183-137. Ray Pickrell and Paul Smart were the top scorers.

Teams
UK		USA	
Rider	Machine	Rider	Machine
Percy Tait (captain)	Triumph	Gary Nixon (captain)	Triumph
John Cooper	BSA	Jim Rice	BSA
Paul Smart	Triumph	Dave Aldana	BSA
Ray Pickrell	BSA	Dick Mann	BSA
Tony Jefferies	Triumph	Don Castro	Triumph
		Don Emde	BSA

=== 1972 ===
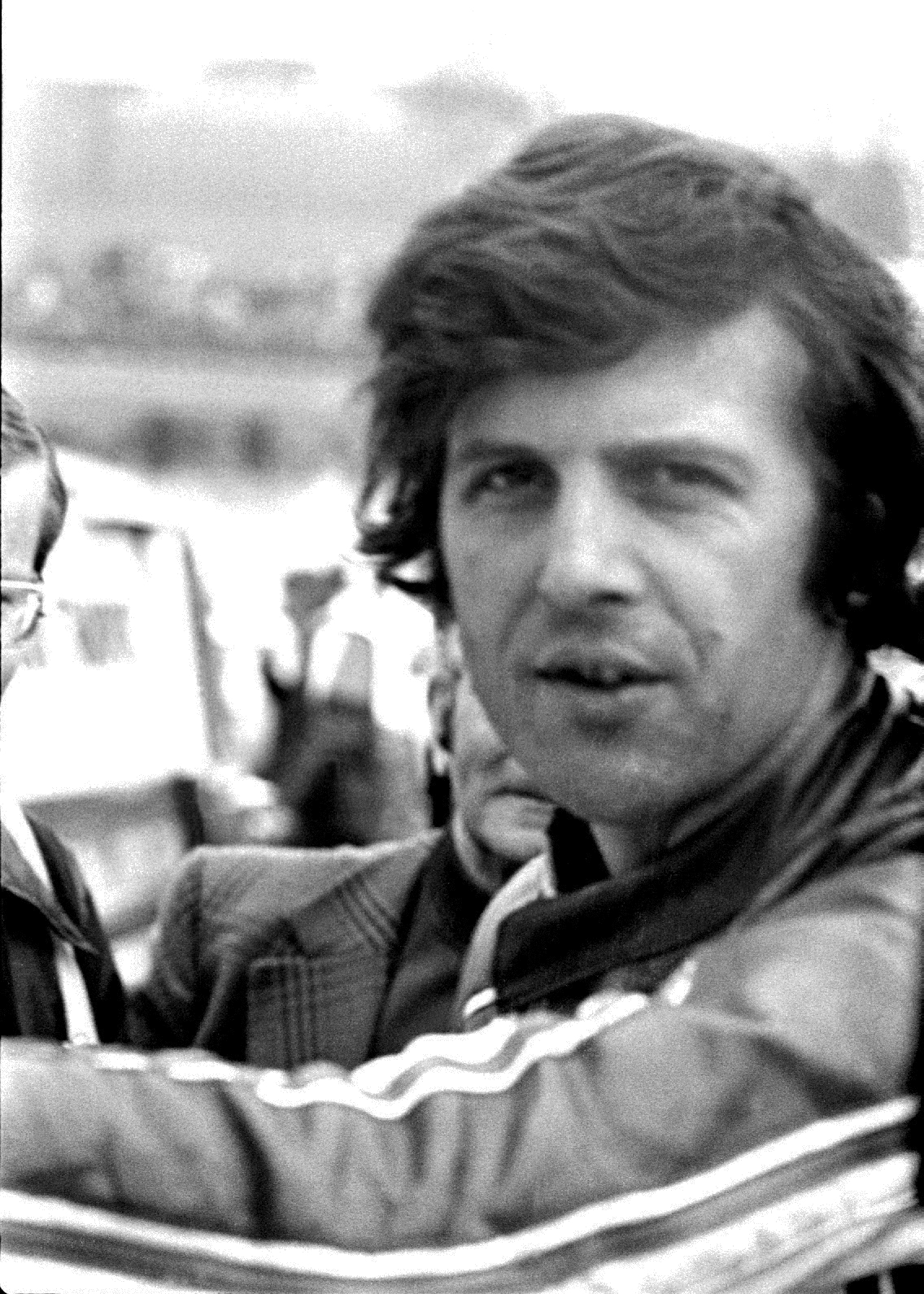
1972 British captain Phil Read

The series was sponsored by John Player and the name changed to Transatlantic Trophy. No longer a one-make series, the BSAs and Triumphs were joined by Nortons, Suzukis and a Harley Davidson. The British won the series 252-210. Cal Rayborn, on an obsolete Harley Davidson as the factory refused to let him use his works machine, and Ray Pickrell were the top scorers with 3 wins each. Don Emde crashed heavily during practice at Oulton Park. His bike ended up in the lake and was hosed down by the Fire Brigade to remove the mud.

Teams
UK		USA	
Rider	Machine	Rider	Machine
Phil Read (captain)	Norton	Dick Mann (captain)	BSA
John Cooper	BSA	Cal Rayborn	Harley Davidson
Tony Jefferies	Triumph	Don Emde	Norton
Ray Pickrell	BSA	Ron Grant	Suzuki
Peter Williams	Norton	Art Baumann	Suzuki
Tony Rutter	Norton	Jody Nicholas	Suzuki

=== 1973 ===
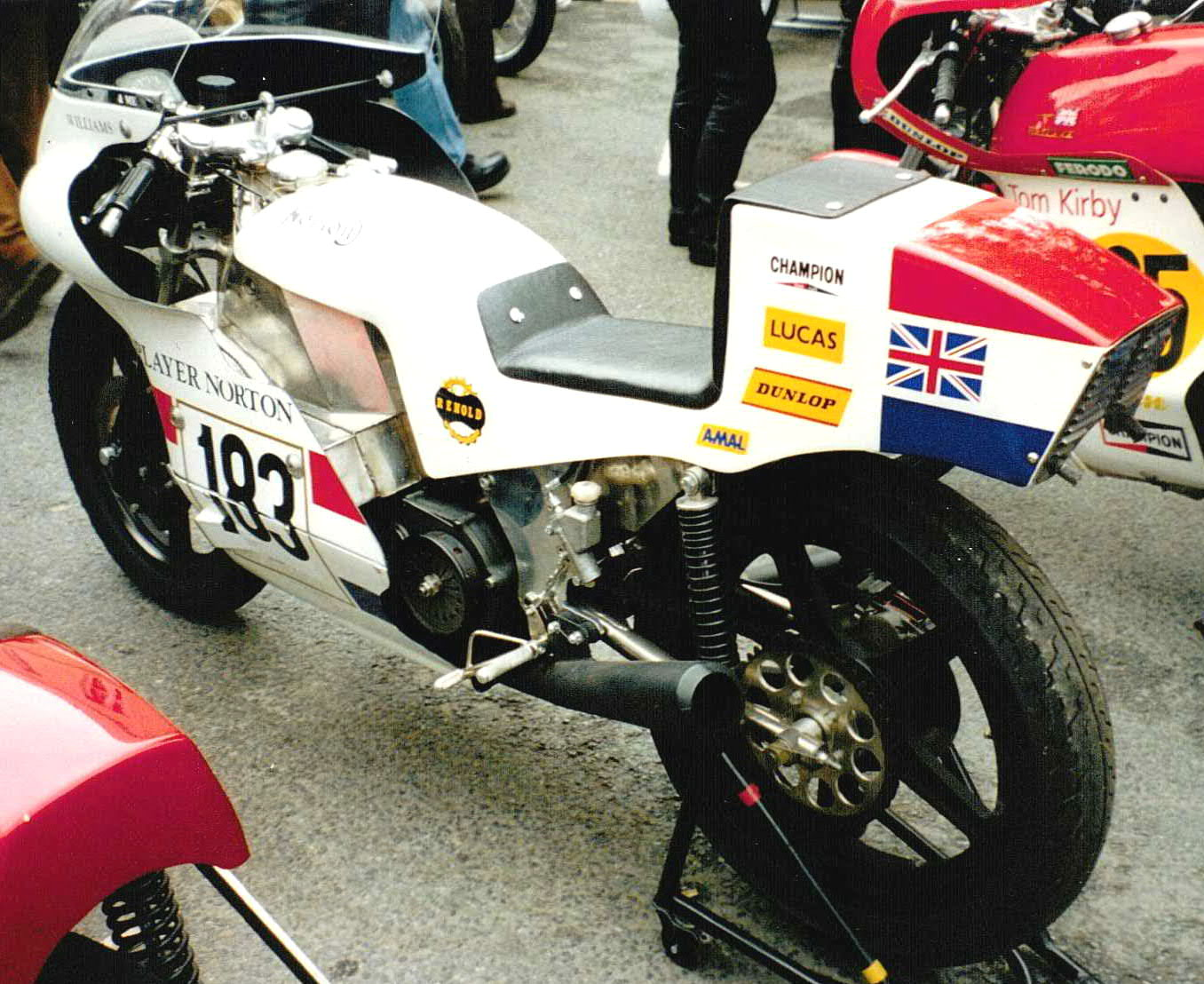
1973 Norton Monocoque as raced by Peter Williams

BSA-Triumph was now part of Norton Villiers Triumph and the BSA brand had been dropped so only Triumph badged triples were entered. Kawasaki bikes appeared for the first time, making 5 different marques on the grid. Britain won the series 416-398. Yvon Duhamel and Peter Williams were the top scorers in the wet races.

Teams
UK		USA	
Rider	Machine	Rider	Machine
Paul Smart (captain)	Suzuki	Cal Rayborn (captain)	Harley Davidson
Barry Sheene	Suzuki	Mert Lawwill	Harley Davidson
John Cooper/Dave Croxford (Note: Cooper crashed his 350 Yamsel in a support race at Mallory Park and Croxford took his place in the Mallory Trophy races.)	John Player Norton	Doug Sehl (Canada)	Harley Davidson
Peter Williams	John Player Norton	Gary Nixon	Kawasaki
Tony Jefferies	Triumph	Yvon Duhamel (Canada)	Kawasaki
Percy Tait	Triumph	Art Baumann	Kawasaki
Mick Grant	Seeley-Kawasaki	Ron Grant	Suzuki
Dave Potter	Kuhn-Norton	Dave Aldana	John Player Norton

=== 1974 ===
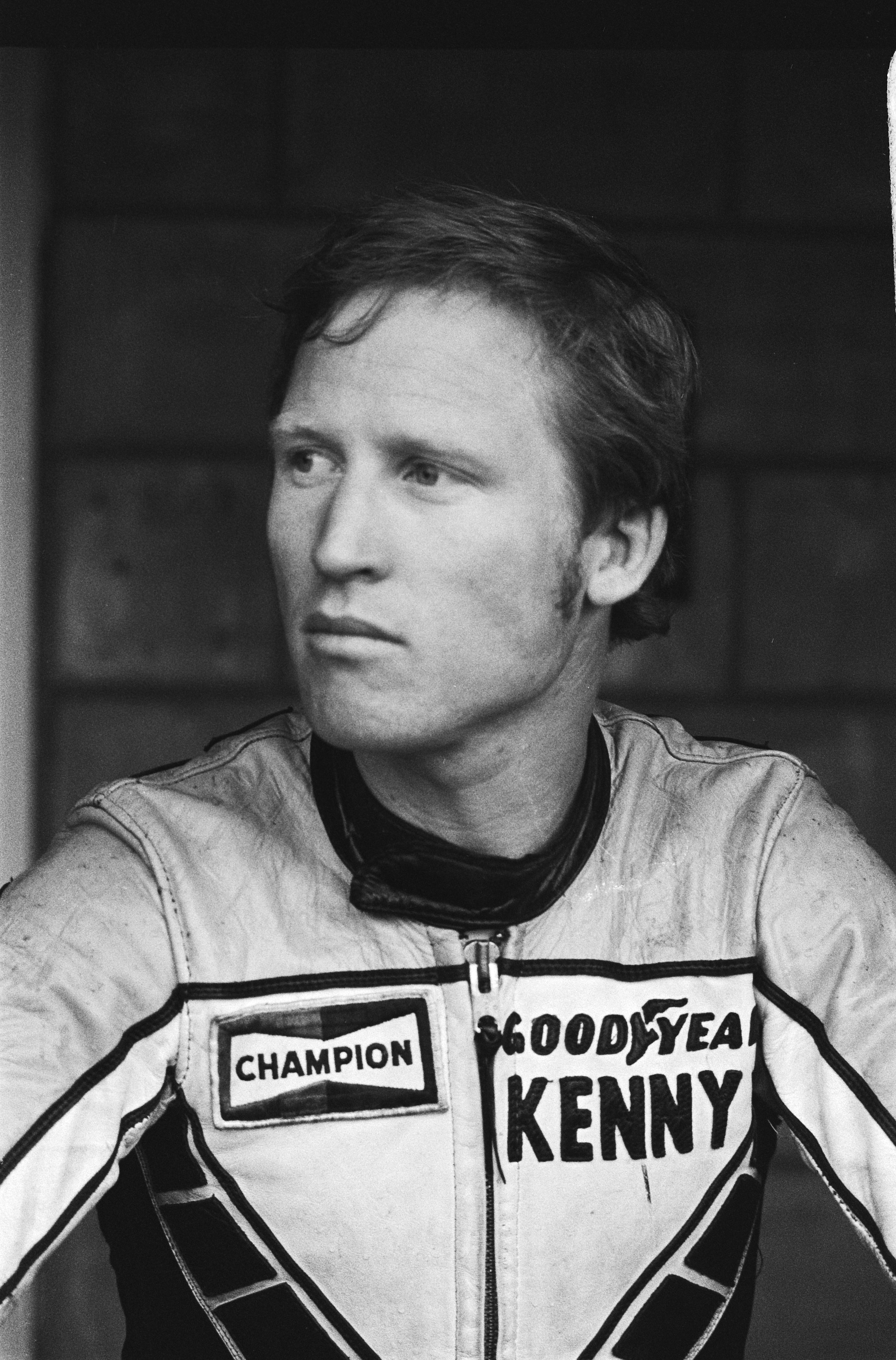
Kenny Roberts, who won four of the six races in 1974

Yamaha motorcycles entered the series for the first time this year with the Yamaha TZ750. Britain won the series 416-401 although American Kenny Roberts was the top scorer with 4 wins. Roberts bike, which was fitted with the newly introduced slick tyres, nearly failed scrutineering for "bald tyres".

Teams
UK		USA	
Rider	Machine	Rider	Machine
Paul Smart (captain)	Suzuki	Yvon Duhamel (Canada) (captain)	Kawasaki
Peter Williams	John Player Norton	Kenny Roberts	Yamaha
Dave Croxford	John Player Norton	Gary Fisher	Yamaha
Barry Sheene	Suzuki	Gene Romero	Yamaha
Stan Woods	Suzuki	John Long	Yamaha
Barry Ditchburn	Yamaha	Dave Aldana	Norton
Mick Grant	Yamaha	Art Baumann	Kawasaki/Yamaha (Note: Baumann used a borrowed Yamaha at Oulton Park following the breakage of his Kawasaki)
Percy Tait	Triumph/Norton (Note: Tait used a Kuhn Norton for the second race at Brands Hatch after his factory Triumph broke down. He completed the rest of the series on a Boyer Triumph)	Gary Nixon	Suzuki
Ron Chandler (reserve)	Kawasaki	Jim Evans (reserve)	Yamaha

=== 1975 ===
The Brands Hatch races were cancelled due to snow. The first race at Mallory Park started dry but snow started to fall near the end of the race. The second race was wet and shortened from 20 to 15 laps. Dave Aldana was the top scorer, although Kenny Roberts had won 3 races. The American team had their first series win scoring 279-242.

Teams
UK		USA	
Rider	Machine	Rider	Machine
Percy Tait (captain)	Yamaha	Kenny Roberts (captain)	Yamaha
Stan Woods	Suzuki	Gene Romero	Yamaha
John Newbold	Suzuki	Don Castro	Yamaha
Mick Grant	Kawasaki	Steve Baker	Yamaha
Barry Ditchburn	Kawasaki	Steve McLaughlin	Yamaha
Dave Croxford	Norton	Pat Hennen	Suzuki
Dave Potter	Yamaha	Dave Aldana	Suzuki
Pat Mahoney	Yamaha	Phil McDonald	Yamaha
Charlie Williams (reserve)	Yamaha	Randy Cleek (reserve)	Yamaha

=== 1976 ===
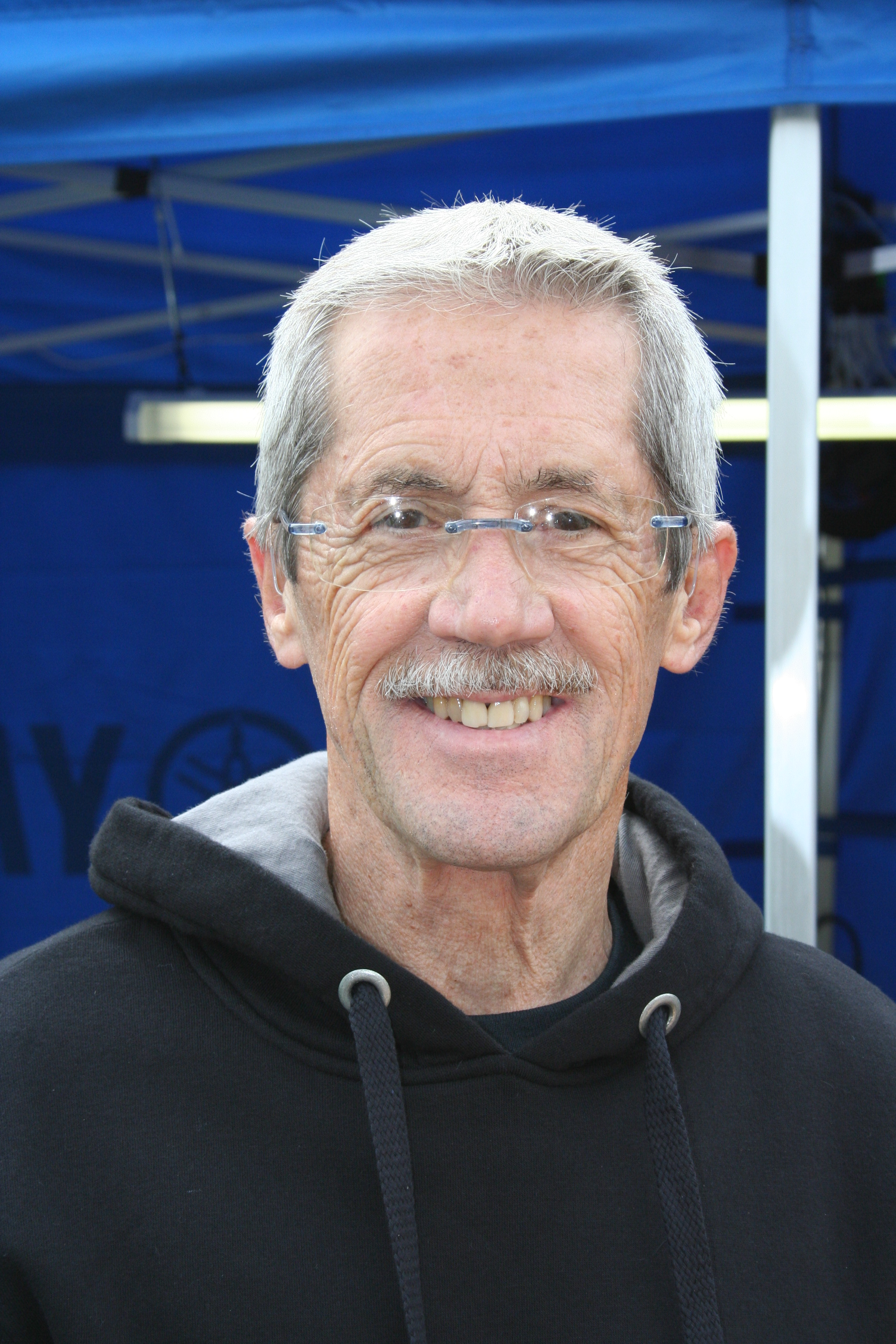
Steve Baker (pictured in 2016) was the top points scorer in 1976

The British team had included John Newbold, but he dropped out. Reserve Steve Parrish was promoted to a full team member and Ron Haslam brought in as the reserve. Phil McDonald was to have been in the American team but was injured prior to the matches.

Norton had commissioned Cosworth to build a twin-cylinder engine based on their highly successful DFV Formula 1 engine. Dave Croxford entered the series on one of the Cosworth-Nortons but the underdeveloped machine performed poorly at Brands and was withdrawn for the other two rounds.

Steve Baker was the top scorer with 4 wins.

Teams
UK		USA	
Rider	Machine	Rider	Machine
Phil Read (captain)	Yamaha	Kenny Roberts (captain)	Yamaha
Mick Grant	Kawasaki	Gene Romero	Yamaha
Barry Ditchburn	Kawasaki	Gary Nixon	Kawasaki
Dave Potter	Yamaha	Randy Cleek	Yamaha
Barry Sheene	Suzuki	Steve Baker	Yamaha
Steve Parrish	Suzuki	Pat Hennen	Suzuki
Dave Croxford	Cosworth-Norton	Pat Evans	Yamaha
John Williams	Suzuki	Ron Pierce	Kawasaki
Ron Haslam (reserve)	Yamaha	Marty Lunde (reserve)	Yamaha

=== 1977 ===
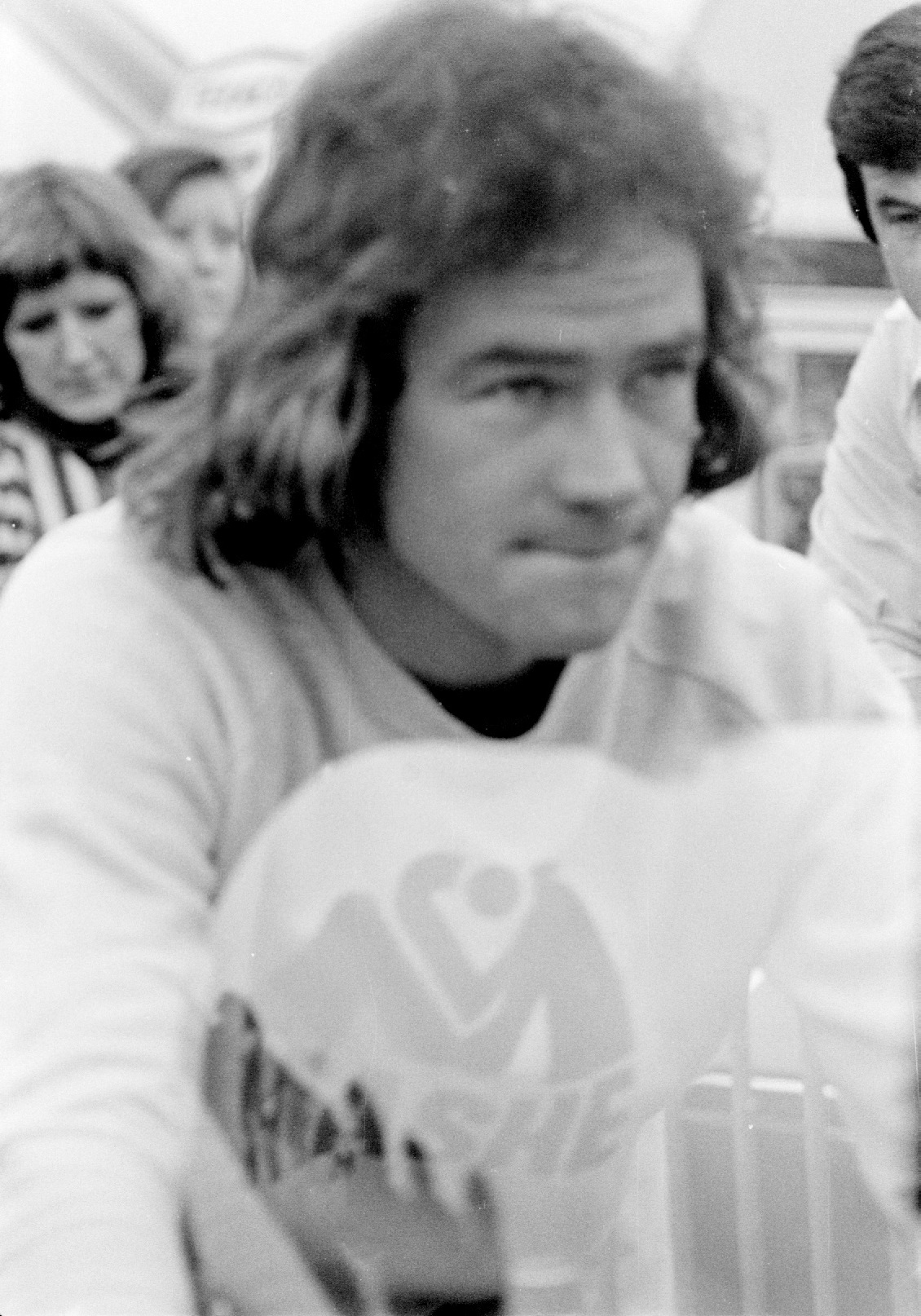
Barry Sheene, the only British race winner in 1977

The American team was to consist of Dave Aldana, Steve Baker, Randy Cleek, Pat Evans, Pat Hennen, Ron Pierce, Kenny Roberts, Gary Scott and Dave Emde as reserve. Following a disagreement with his sponsor Pierce withdrew from the team. Emde was promoted to a full team member and Skip Aksland brought in as reserve. Evans was killed at the Imola Circuit the weekend prior to the Transatlantic Trophy and Cleek killed in a road accident on his way back from the Imola track. Pierce re-joined the team, Aksland was promoted to a full team member and Kevin Stafford introduced as reserve.

Barry Sheene won one race for the UK but the other five races were won by Americans; Roberts won four races and Hennen one. Hennen was the top scorer. The Americans won the series 405-380.

Teams
UK		USA	
Rider	Machine	Rider	Machine
Percy Tait (captain)	non-riding	Kenny Roberts (captain)	Yamaha
Steve Parrish	Suzuki	Pat Hennen	Suzuki
Phil Read	Kawasaki	Gary Scott	Yamaha
Dave Potter	Yamaha	Dave Emde	Yamaha
Barry Sheene	Suzuki	Dave Aldana	Yamaha
Paul Smart	Yamaha	Ron Pierce	Yamaha
John Williams	Yamaha	Skip Aksland	Yamaha
Mick Grant	Kawasaki	Steve Baker	Yamaha
Barry Ditchburn	Kawasaki	Kevin Stafford (reserve)	Yamaha
Roger Marshall (reserve)	Yamaha		

=== 1978 ===
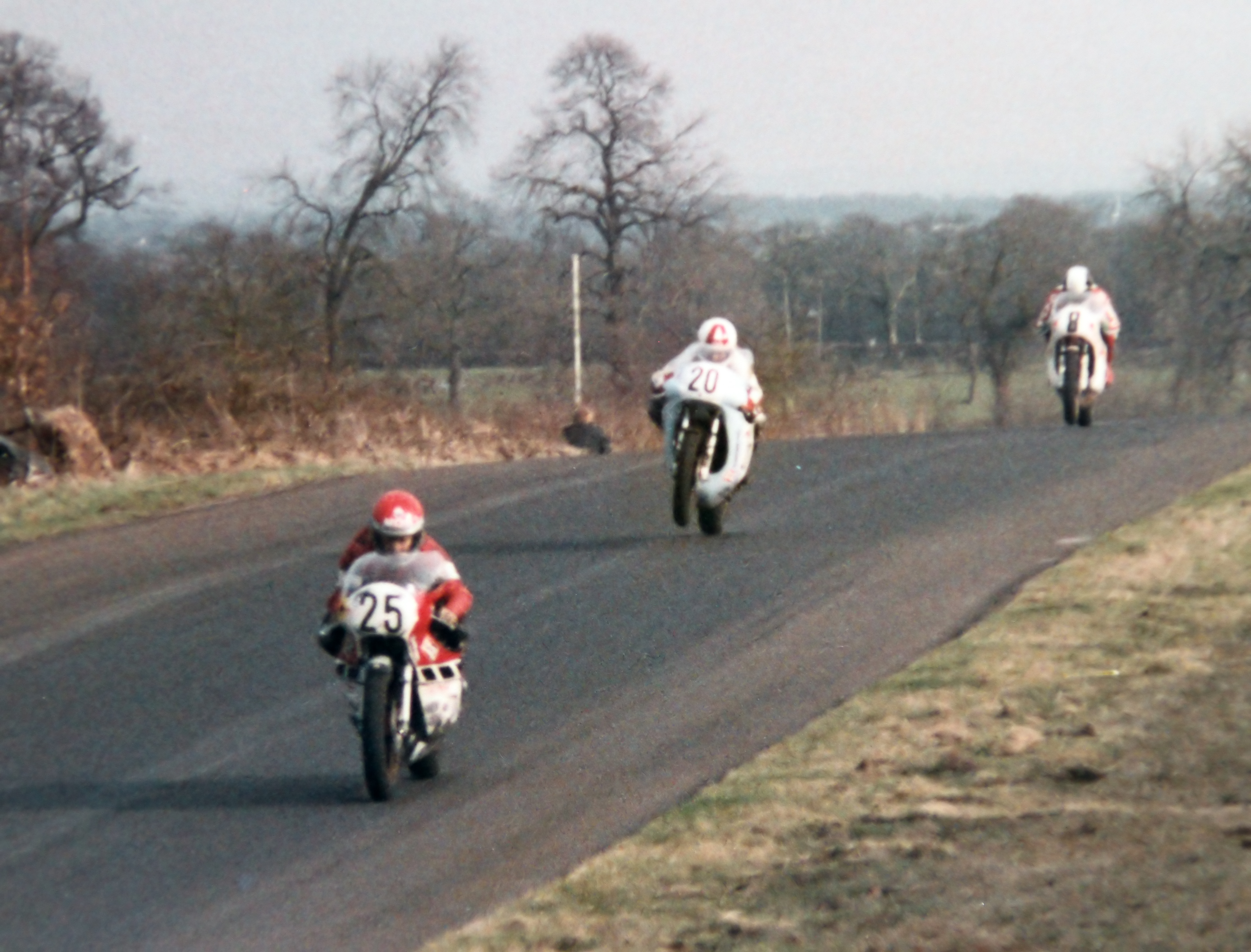
1978 Easter Trans-Atlantic races at Oulton Park

Barry Sheene, Mick Grant and Dave Potter were seeded into the team. The rest of the teams was decided by lap times during a qualifying session prior to the first race at Brands Hatch.

The UK won the series 435-379 in front of a combined crowd of 150,000. Pat Hennen was the top scorer.

Teams
UK		USA	
Rider	Machine	Rider	Machine
Barry Sheene (captain)	Suzuki	Kenny Roberts (captain)	Yamaha
Mick Grant	Kawasaki	Pat Hennen	Suzuki
Dave Potter	Yamaha	Gene Romero	Yamaha
Barry Ditchburn	Yamaha	Dave Aldana	Yamaha
Roger Marshall	Yamaha	Skip Aksland	Yamaha
Ron Haslam	Yamaha	David Emde	Yamaha
John Williams	Yamaha	Dale Singleton	Yamaha
Steve Manship	Yamaha	Mike Baldwin	Yamaha
Steve Wright (reserve)	Yamaha	Bruce Hammer (reserve)	Yamaha

=== 1979 ===
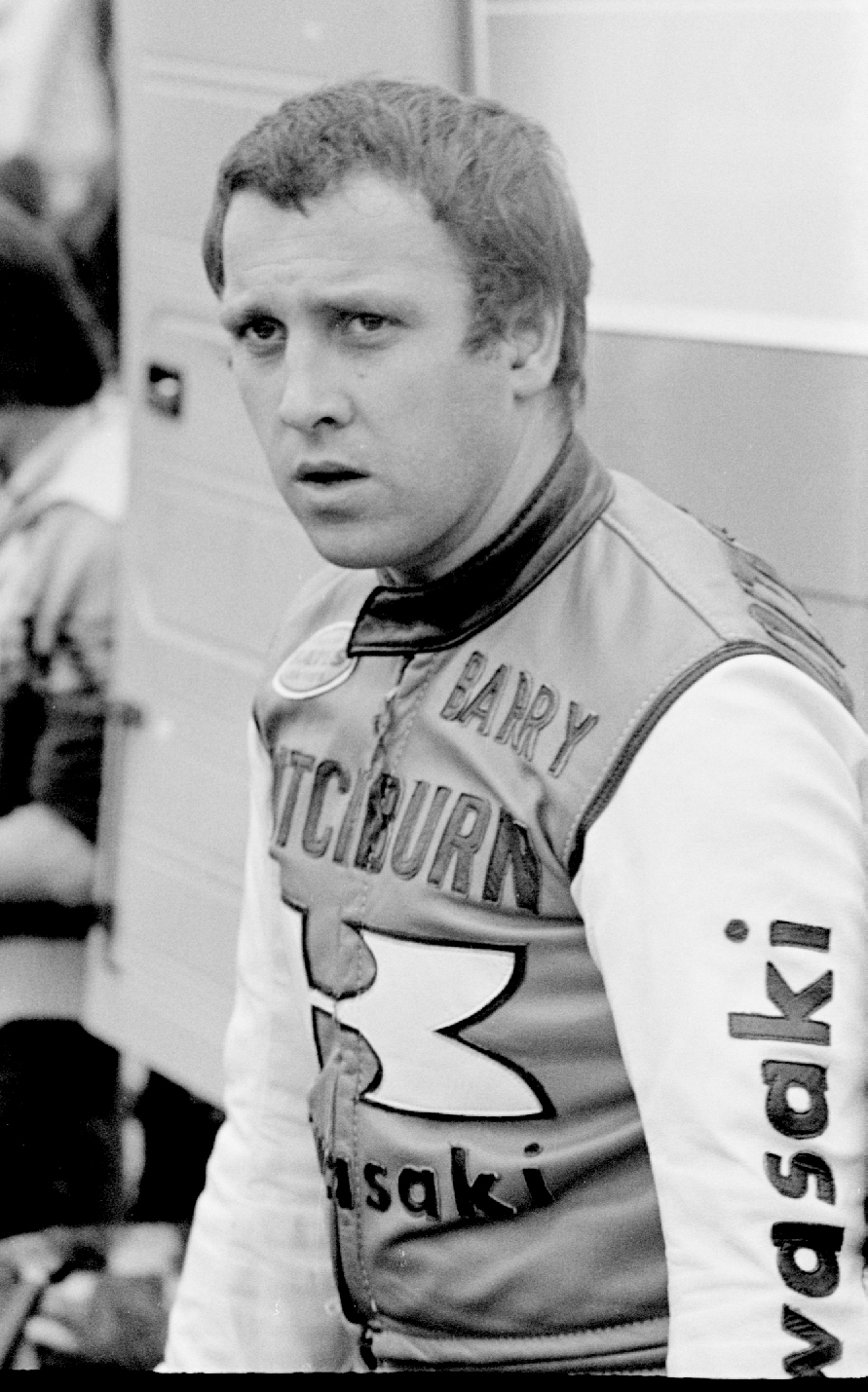
Barry Ditchburn, one of the seeded British team

Barry Sheene, Mick Grant, Dave Potter, Barry Ditchburn, Tom Herron and Steve Parrish were seeded into the British team. The remaining three members qualified for their places in a qualifying session on the day before the first race at the Brands Hatch round.

The American obtained the highest winning margin to date, 448-352, winning all 3 rounds. Mike Baldwin was the top scorer.

Teams
UK		USA	
Rider	Machine	Rider	Machine
Barry Sheene (captain)	Suzuki	Dave Aldana (captain)	Yamaha
Mick Grant	Yamaha	Steve Baker	Yamaha
Dave Potter	Yamaha	Mike Baldwin	Yamaha
Barry Ditchburn	Kawasaki	Dale Singleton	Yamaha
Tom Herron	Suzuki	Gene Romero	Yamaha
Steve Parrish	Suzuki	Randy Mamola	Yamaha
John Newbold	Yamaha	Rich Schlachter	Yamaha
Ron Haslam	Yamaha	Wes Cooley	Yamaha
Keith Huewen	Yamaha	John Long	Yamaha

=== 1980 ===
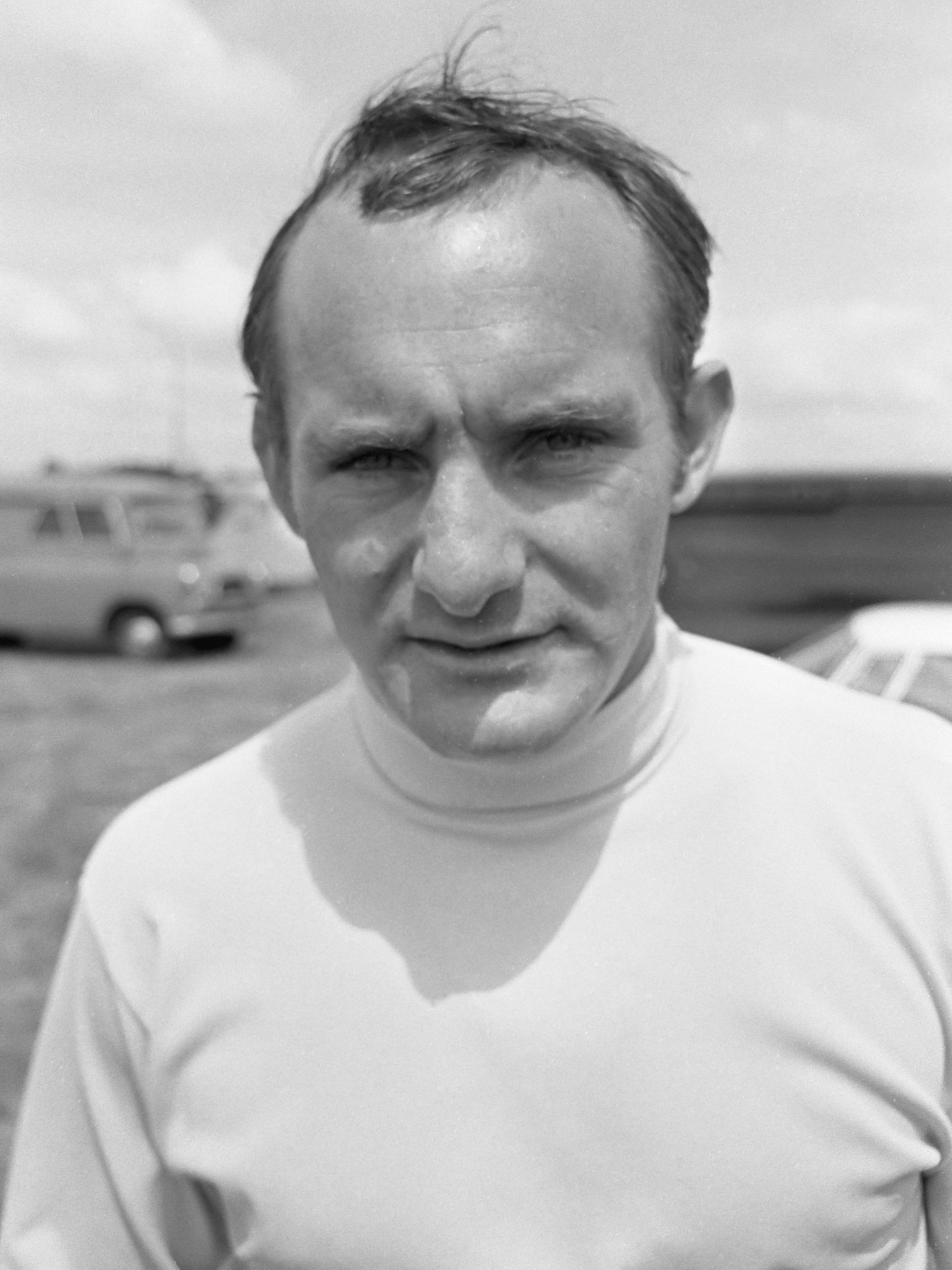
Mike Hailwood, non-riding captain of the British team in 1980

AMA Superbike Championship specification machines were permitted, allowing Dave Aldana and Wes Cooley to use 1,024cc Yoshimura Suzuki machines. Americans won all the races: Kenny Roberts 3, Freddie Spencer 2 and Randy Mamola 1. The USA won the series 442-370 and Roberts was the top scorer. 140,000 fans attended the races.

Teams
UK		USA	
Rider	Machine	Rider	Machine
Mike Hailwood (captain)	Non-riding	Kenny Roberts (captain)	Yamaha 750
Barry Sheene	Yamaha 750	Dale Singleton	Yamaha 750
Ron Haslam	Yamaha 750	Rich Schlachter	Yamaha 750
Graeme Crosby (New Zealand)	Suzuki 653, 500	Freddie Spencer	Yamaha 750
Keith Huewen	Yamaha 750	John Long	Yamaha 750
John Newbold	Yamaha 750	Wes Cooley	Yoshimura-Suzuki 1024
Graham Wood	Suzuki 500	Randy Mamola	Suzuki 653, 500
Dave Potter	Yamaha 750	Dave Aldana	Yoshimura-Suzuki 1024
Mick Grant	Yamaha 750	Skip Aksland	Yamaha 750
Steve Manship	Yamaha 750		
Alan Pacey (reserve)	Yamaha 750		

=== 1981 ===
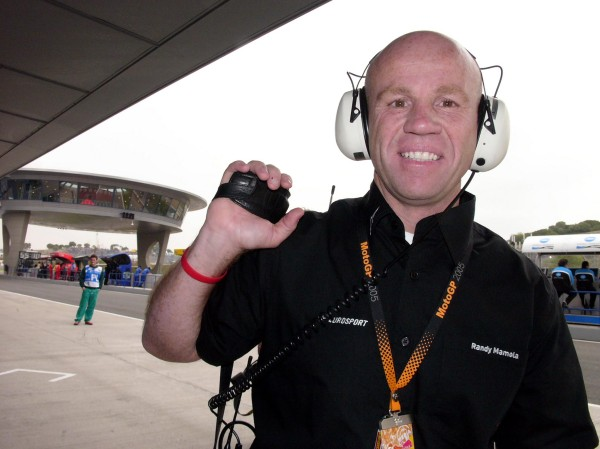
Randy Mamola (pictured in 2009), won three of the races in 1981

The American team was depleted for the 1981 races. World Champion Kenny Roberts was unavailable for the series as he was required by Yamaha to test their new square four GP racer. Dave Aldana and Mike Baldwin were competing in the 24 Hours of Le Mans endurance race for Honda. Yoshimura and Suzuki refused to allow Wes Cooley to use his Superbike for the series and he used a borrowed a 750 Yamaha for the races. A Honda America Superbike wasn't available for Freddie Spencer to use and had to compete on a borrowed Suzuki RG500.

Randy Mamola won three races for the US. John Newbold was the top points scorer for Great Britain, who won the series 466-345..

Teams
UK		USA	
Rider	Machine	Rider	Machine
Joey Dunlop	Honda 1100	James Adamo	Yamaha 750
Ron Haslam	Honda 1100	Dan Chivington	Yamaha 750
Steve Henshaw	Yamaha 750	Wes Cooley	Yamaha 750
Keith Huewen	Suzuki 500	John Long	Yamaha 750
Roger Marshall	Kawasaki 1000	Randy Mamola	Suzuki 500
John Newbold	Suzuki 1000	Nicky Richichi	Yamaha 750
Dave Potter	Yamaha 750	Rich Schlachter	Yamaha 750
Barry Sheene	Yamaha 750	Dale Singleton	Yamaha 750
Graham Wood	Yamaha 750	Freddie Spencer	Suzuki 500

=== 1982 ===
The American team was again understrength this year with Kenny Roberts and Randy Mamola testing GP machines. Freddie Spencer crashed in the first race and destroyed his machine. Without a spare available he was out for the rest of the match. Barry Sheene won 5 of the 6 races. A mistake on the last lap of the other race while in the lead allowed Roger Marshall to pass and deprive Sheene of a $40,0000 bonus for winning all the races.

Sheene was the top scorer with Dave Aldana the top scoring American. Britain won the series 491-313.

Teams
UK		USA	
Rider	Machine	Rider	Machine
Steve Henshaw	750 Yamaha	Dave Aldana	750 Yamaha
Keith Huewen	500 Suzuki	Mike Baldwin	1000 Honda
Gary Lingham	500 Suzuki	Wes Cooley	997 Suzuki
Roger Marshall	997 Suzuki	Mark Homchick	750 Yamaha
John Newbold	997 Suzuki	Roberto Pietri (Venezuela)	Suzuki
Steve Parrish	500 Yamaha	Nicky Richichi	750 Yamaha
Barry Sheene	500 Yamaha	Rich Schlachter	750 Yamaha
Bob Smith	500 Suzuki	Dale Singleton	750 Yamaha
Graham Wood	750 Yamaha	Alan Ward	750 Yamaha

=== 1983 ===
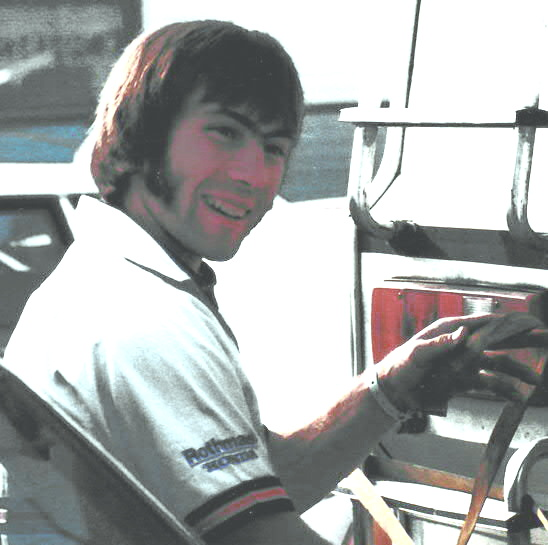
Ron Haslam won four races and was the top scorer in 1983

Motor Circuit Developments (MCD), the owners of the 3 circuits used for the races, Brands Hatch, Mallory Park and Oulton Park, came under financial pressure from their parent company, Eagle Star Insurance in 1982. This resulted in MCD selling Mallory Park in late 1982. Snetterton was owned by MCD and was chosen to replace Mallory Park. To fit into Snetterton's schedule, the Trophy races were pushed back from Easter to May Day weekend and the order of races reversed. Oulton Park held the first races and Brands Hatch the last.

The later running of the races meant the GP season had started and Honda would not sanction Freddie Spencer taking part. Mike Baldwin fell in the first race and broke three toes, putting him out of the rest of the races. As there were no reserve riders, the American team raced with a man short. Kenny Roberts and Eddie Lawson were both on the Yamaha square 4 680 cc OW69 that they had scored a 1-2 at that year's Daytona 200. But the wet conditions and tight circuits didn't allow them to make full use of the considerable power the Yamaha made.

Ron Haslam was the top scorer and won four races, Randy Mamola won the other two. Britain won the series 245-198.

Teams
UK		USA	
Rider	Machine	Rider	Machine
Ron Haslam	500 Honda	Dave Aldana	500 Suzuki
Keith Huewen	500 Suzuki	Mike Baldwin	999 Honda
Roger Marshall	500 Honda	Wes Cooley	1025 Kawasaki
Mark Salle	500 Suzuki	Eddie Lawson	680 Yamaha
Barry Sheene	500 Suzuki	Randy Mamola	500 Suzuki
Graham Wood	750 Yamaha	Kenny Roberts	680 Yamaha

=== 1984 ===
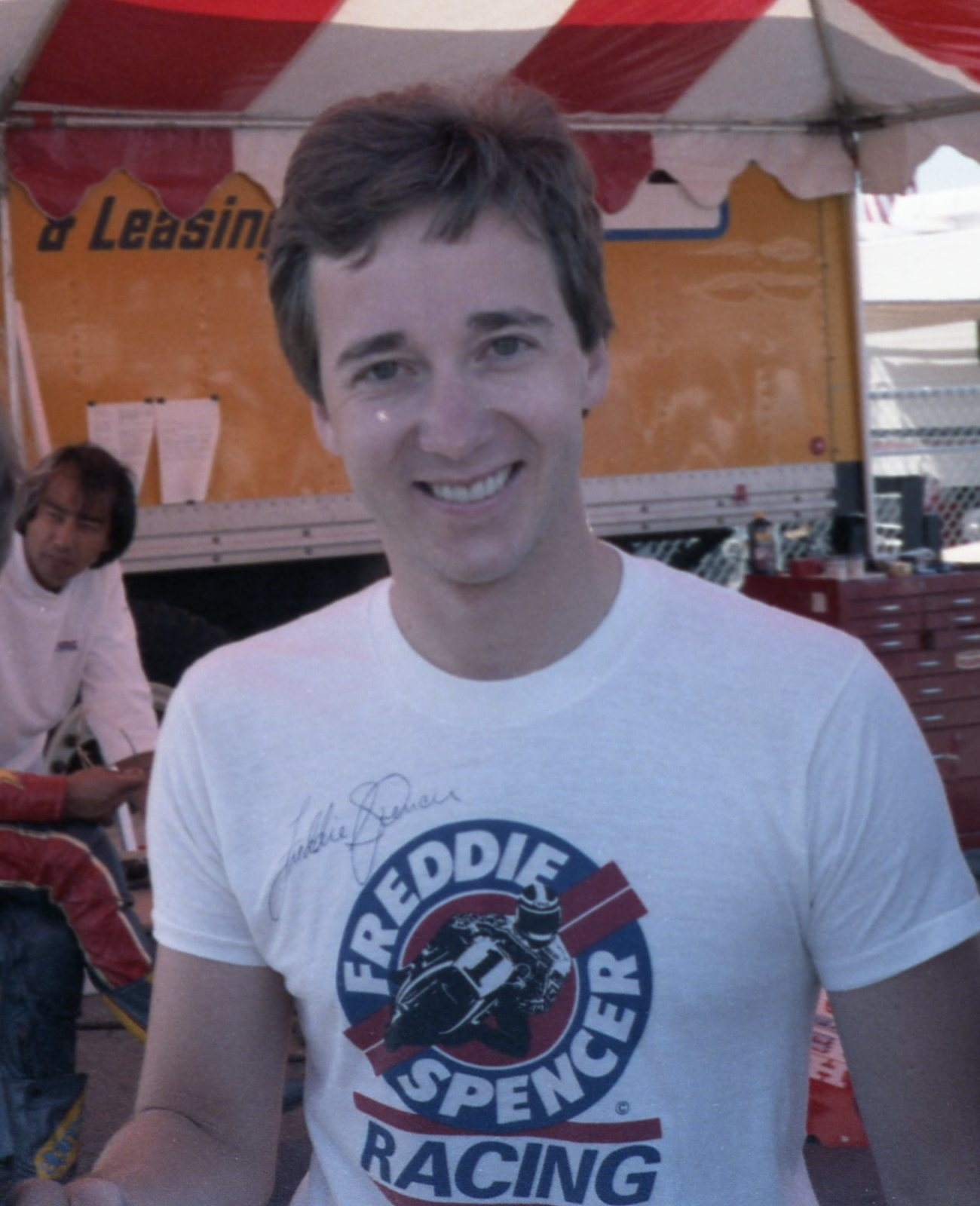
Freddie Spencer, who won two of the races in 1984 before crashing and breaking bones in both feet.

There were allegations of financial irregularities by Motor Circuit Developments, owners of the circuits the matches were run on, in late 1983 and the future of the matches was in doubt. Tom Wheatcroft, owner of Donington Park, stepped in and arranged for the series to be staged at Donington. The races were run at Donington with 3 races each day on Easter Sunday and Monday in front of an 85,000 crowd.

The British team included New Zealander Graeme Crosby and Australian Wayne Gardner was billed as the British Commonwealth.

The American team included the top four of the 1983 GP Championship. Wayne Rainey was injured in a crash in practice and didn't compete in the races. Freddie Spencer crashed in the races and broke bones in both his feet.

Americans won all the races; Randy Mamola winning three, Spencer two and Kenny Roberts one, and won the series 259-136.

Teams
British Commonwealth		USA	
Rider	Machine	Rider	Machine
Ron Haslam	Honda NS500	Freddie Spencer	Honda NSR500
Barry Sheene	Suzuki RG500	Kenny Roberts	Yamaha TZR500
Wayne Gardner (Australia)	Honda RS500	Randy Mamola	Honda NS500
Roger Marshall	Honda RS500	Eddie Lawson	Yamaha TZR500
Graeme Crosby (New Zealand)	Yoshimura-Suzuki 1023	Wayne Rainey	Yamaha TZ500
Keith Huewen	Honda RS500	Wes Cooley	Honda RS500
Rob McElnea	Suzuki RG500	Mike Baldwin	Honda RS500
Steve Parrish	Yamaha TZ500	David Aldana	Suzuki RG500

=== 1985 ===
The match returned to its usual format of two races a day on Good Friday, Easter Sunday and Easter Monday which was less demanding for the riders. Honda refused to let Freddie Spencer take part and Yamaha blocked Eddie Lawson's participation. Kenny Roberts was busy putting together a 500 cc GP team, leaving Randy Mamola and Mike Baldwin to lead a team of mostly non-factory riders.

Wayne Gardner, the Australian riding for Britain, won three races and Mamola two. Britain won the series 336-254.

Teams
UK		USA	
Rider	Machine	Rider	Machine
Ron Haslam	500 Honda	Mike Baldwin	500 Honda
Steve Parrish	500 Yamaha	Rich Schlachter	500 Honda
Wayne Gardner (Australia)	500 Honda	Randy Mamola	500 Honda
Roger Burnett	500 Honda	James Adamo	500 Cagiva
Mick Grant	998 Suzuki	Doug Brauneck	Yamaha
Roger Marshall	500 Honda	Randy Renfrow	500 Honda
Gary Lingham	500 Suzuki	Jeff Haney	500 Honda
Rob McElnea	500 Suzuki	Wayne Rainey	Honda

=== 1986 ===
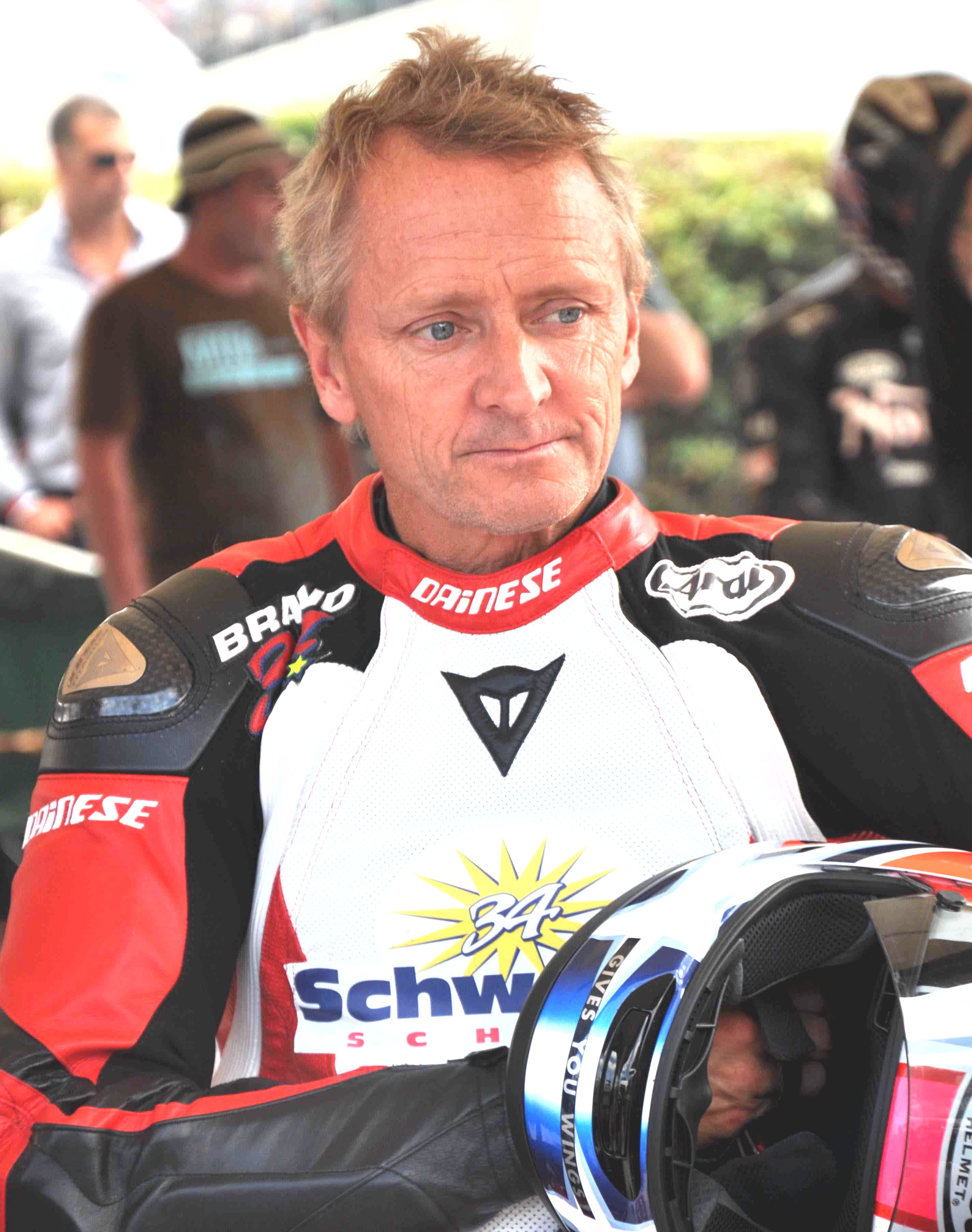
Kevin Schwantz, who won four races and was the top scorer in 1986

With the lack of American riders competing in GP racing and the rise in popularity of Superbikes both sides of the Atlantic, the series was run for Superbikes only. With the top US riders tied to GP contracts, the American team consisted of riders not well known outside the US.

As he was unable to use his GP bike, Honda gave Ron Haslam a tuned version of the VFR750 to use. The bike blew up in practice leaving Haslam without a machine for the races. Haslam brought a new road-going version of the VFR750 from a local dealer, stripped off as many road going parts and fitted racing tyres. The tyres were intended for a 250 but were the largest that would fit on the bike. It rained during the first race making the lack of power and ground clearance compared to the full-blown superbikes less of a problem. Haslam finished in third place.

8 races were run over the Easter weekend. Kevin Schwantz won 4 and Fred Merkel two. Britain beat the USA 314-214. Kevin Schwantz was the top scorer with 84 points.

Teams
UK		USA	
Rider	Machine	Rider	Machine
Rob McElnea (captain)	Yamaha 750	Fred Merkel (captain)	Honda 750
Ron Haslam	Honda 750	Ricky Orlando	Honda
Steve Parrish	Yamaha 750	Glenn Barry	Honda
Neil Robinson	Suzuki	Rueben McMurter (Canada)	Yamaha 750
Kenny Irons	Yamaha 750	Sam McDonald	Yamaha
Roger Burnett	Honda 750	Dale Quarterley	Yamaha 750
Roger Marshall	Honda 750	Kevin Schwantz	Suzuki 750
Gary Lingham	Suzuki	John Ashmead	Honda
Keith Huewen	Suzuki 750	John Bettencourt	Honda 750
Graeme McGregor (Australia)	Suzuki	Dan Chivington	Yamaha 750
Trevor Nation	Suzuki 750	Michel Mercier (Canada)	Suzuki 750
Chris Martin	Suzuki 750	Lance Jones	Honda
Paul Iddon	Suzuki 750	Ted Boody	Yamaha

=== 1987 ===
Brands Hatch returned as a venue, with 3 races on Good Friday. Donington hosted six races on Easter Sunday and Monday. A 12 man British team were matched against an 11 man American team. Only the top ten riders of each team were awarded points in races. The motorcycles were to American Superbike specification. 1987 American captain Fred Merkel couldn't agree terms for 1988 so wasn't in the team. Three Canadians joined the American team: Michel Mercier and Gary Goodfellow with the backing of Suzuki Canada and Reuben McMurter from Yamaha Canada. American Bubba Shobert crashed in practice and was unable to compete in the races.

The intense rivalry between Kevin Schwantz and Wayne Rainey carried over into the match races giving the British audience a preview of future battling between the pair in GP racing.

All the races were won by Americans, Wayne Rainey won 5 of the races and Kevin Schwantz 4. America won the series 993.5-745.5.

Teams
UK		USA	
Rider	Machine	Rider	Machine
Simon Buckmaster	750 Honda	Wayne Rainey	750 Honda
Mark Phillips	750 Suzuki	Gary Goodfellow (Canada)	750 Suzuki
Ray Swann	750 Suzuki	Ottis Lance	750 Suzuki
Trevor Nation	750 Yamaha	Jim Filice	750 Yamaha
Ron Haslam	750 Honda	Doug Polen	750 Suzuki
Phil Mellor	750 Suzuki	Reuben McMurter (Canada)	750 Yamaha
Jamie Whitham	750 Suzuki	Kevin Schwantz	750 Suzuki
Keith Huewen	750 Yamaha	Michel Mercier (Canada)	750 Suzuki
Geoff Fowler	750 Yamaha	John Ashmead	750 Honda
Roger Hurst	750 Yamaha	Dan Chivington	750 Honda
Peter Dalby	750 Suzuki	Bubba Shobert	750 Honda
Gary Lingham	Kawasaki		

=== 1988 ===
Donington was to host the inaugural round of the Superbike World Championship on Easter Sunday. For the mutual benefit of both WSB and the Transatlantic Match (which both used similar specification machines) the Transatlanic series was expanded to four teams and renamed the Eurolantic Challenge as it included European riders. For the promotors this allowed them to spread the costs over two series, and for the riders this offered the prospect of extra payday.

The British No 1 team were led by Ron Haslam and the riders were all factory backed. The American team was led by Bubba Shobert on a works Honda VFR750. For the first time, Yoshimura Suzuki sent a factory crew to support Doug Polen and Scott Gray. Four Canadians joined the American team on works bikes.

Norton had introduced a twin rotor Wankel engined racer, the RC588. Although nominally 588 cc, the FIM had yet to agree with Norton the method of measuring displacement of the rotary engine. Until this was resolved the Norton could only race in national and non-championship races. Two machines were entered into the Eurolantic Challenge, ridden by Trevor Nation and Simon Buckmaster. This would be the first time the machines were raced.

There were 3 races at Brands Hatch on Good Friday and 3 races at Donington on Easter Monday (the WSB races being on Easter Sunday). Polen was the top scorer and had won four races. Shobert had won the other two. The British No 1 team were overall winners with 586 points, the Americans second with 570 points. Most of the European team left after the WSB and didn't compete on the Monday. This was reflected in their score of 287 points. The British No 2 team scored 281 points.

Teams
UK 1		USA		UK 2		Europe	
Rider	Machine	Rider	Machine	Rider	Machine	Rider	Machine
Ron Haslam (captain)	Elf Honda	Bubba Shobert (captain)	Honda	Roger Marshall (captain)	Padgett Suzuki	Anders Anderson (Sweden) (captain)	Suzuki
Joey Dunlop	Gemini Honda RC30	Fred Merkel	Honda	Trevor Nation	Norton	Peter Rubatto (Germany)	Bimota Yamaha
Mark Phillips	Bimota Yamaha	Doug Polen	Yoshimura Suzuki	Kenny Irons	Bridge Honda RC30	Jari Suhonen (Finland)	Yamaha
Roger Burnett	Shell Honda	Gary Goodfellow (Canada)	Suzuki	Simon Buckmaster	Norton	Esko Kuparinen (Finland)	Kawasaki
Phil Mellor	Suzuki	Rueben McMurter (Canada)	Yamaha	Andy McGladdery	Suzuki	Paul Ramon (Belgium)	Honda RC30
Keith Huewen	Bimota Yamaha	Michel Mercier (Canada)	Suzuki	Paul Iddon	Bimota Suzuki	Hans Lindner (Austria)	Honda
Jamie Whitham	Suzuki	Tom Douglas (Canada)	Yamaha	David Heal	Suzuki	Graeme McGregor (Australia)	Honda RC30
Ray Swann	Kawasaki	Scott Gray	Suzuki	Darren Dixon	Padgett Suzuki	Michael Galinski (Germany)	Bimota Yamaha
				Terry Rymer (reserve)	Yamaha	Dieter Heinen (Belgium) (reserve)	Honda RC30
				Mark Linscott (reserve)	Suzuki		

=== 1991 ===
The series consisted of three races at Mallory Park and three at Brands Hatch, the series was called the Transatlantic Superbike Challenge and run in early May. The British team, led by captain Ron Haslam, was well known to racing fans but apart from captain Freddie Spencer, the American team were relatively unknown. Canadian Miguel Duhamel, son of Yvon Duhamel, who had competed in the 1973 and 1974 matches, was in the American team.

Ray Stringer won all three races at Brands Hatch. Haslam won two and Rob McElnea one at Mallory. Britain won the series 625-161 and Stringer was the top scorer.

Teams
UK		USA	
Rider	Machine	Rider	Machine
Ron Haslam (captain)	JPS Norton RCW588	Freddie Spencer (captain)	Honda VFR 750
Terry Rymer	Yamaha FZR 750R	Thomas Stevens	Yamaha FZR 750R
Brian Morrison	Yamaha FZR 750R	Jamie James	Yamaha FZR 750R
Trevor Nation	JPS Norton RCW588	Scott Russell	Kawasaki ZXR 750R
Steve Spray	Kawasaki ZXR 750R	Jaques Guenette (Canada)	Kawasaki ZXR 750R
Jamie Whitham	Suzuki GSXR 750R	Richard Arnaiz	Honda VFR 750
John Reynolds	Kawasaki ZXR 750R	Robert Holden (New Zealand)	Honda VFR 750
Rob McElnea	Yamaha FZR 750R	Luis Carlos Maurel (Spain)	Yamaha FZR 750R
Carl Fogarty	Honda VFR 750	Marcello Del Guidice	
Ray Stringer	Yamaha FZR 750R	John Long	Suzuki GSXR 750R
Niall MacKenzie	Honda VFR 750	Michael Barnes	Yamaha FZR 750R
Mark Linscott	Honda VFR 750	Miguel Duhamel (Canada)	Honda VFR 750

== Revivals ==
Triumph Motorcycles Ltd revived the concept in 1996 with a single-make 3 race match at Donington using the 900 cc Speed Triple. Amongst the Americans competing was Dave Aldana, who had competed in the first Anglo-American Match Races in 1971. Britain won overall 614-426.

The concept was again revived in May 2015 as part of the MCN Festival of Motorcycling at the East of England Showground when a Transatlantic Trophy was staged between British and American teams flat track racing. The event was repeated at the 2016 show.

In late 2015, MotoAmerica and BSB officials looked into the possibility of reviving the Transatlantic Trophy races, with races at three different circuits over a long weekend.
