= Gary Nixon =

American motorcycle racer

- Nixon with the Daytona 200 winner's trophy
- Born: 25 January 1941; Anadarko, Oklahoma
- Died: 5 August 2011 (aged 70); Towson, Maryland
Motorcycle racing career statistics
Grand Prix motorcycle racing
Active years	1960 - 1979
Team(s)	Triumph, Kawasaki, Suzuki
Starts / Wins / Podiums / Poles / F. laps / Points; / 1 / 0 / 0 / 0 / 0

Gary Nixon (January 25, 1941 – August 5, 2011) was an American professional motorcycle racer. He competed in AMA dirt track and road racing competitions from 1960 to 1979, most prominently as a member of the Triumph factory racing team where he won the A.M.A. Grand National Championship in 1967 and 1968. Known as one of the fiercest dirt-track racers of his era, Nixon scored 19 AMA National victories in a 20-year professional motorcycle racing career. At the time of his retirement in 1979, he was ranked sixth all-time in AMA National victories and ranked third in road race victories. Nixon was inducted into the AMA Motorcycle Hall of Fame in 1998 and the Motorsports Hall of Fame of America in 2003.

== Motorcycle racing career ==
=== Early career ===
Nixon was born in Anadarko, Oklahoma where he grew up excelling in multiple sports including football, basketball, and baseball. However, as he grew older, he was hindered by his diminutive size playing against larger opponents, so he turned his attention to drag racing after receiving his drivers license at the age of 14. Nixon won his first drag racing championship at the age of 15, then began to compete in motorcycle dirt track racing. Nixon quickly proved to be a talented motorcycle racer, winning the 1958 Oklahoma State Scrambles Championship at the age of 18. His diminutive size gave him a power-to-weight advantage over his competitors.

=== Triumph factory sponsorship ===
In 1960, Nixon began to compete in the AMA Grand National Championship which encompassed five distinct forms of competitions including mile dirt track races, half-mile, short-track, TT steeplechase and road races. In 1963, he signed a contract to race for the Triumph factory racing team and relocated to Cockeysville, Maryland, to be nearer to Triumph's east coast distributor located in Towson, Maryland, just outside of Baltimore. He first rose to prominence in 1963 when he won his first AMA National road race at Recreation Park in Windber, Pennsylvania and three weeks later, won again at the short-track national at Santa Fe Park in Hinsdale, Illinois.

The 1964 Daytona 200 marked the first time that Nixon had competed in the event which was considered to be the most prestigious race on the AMA calendar. He was leading the race comfortably when a botched pit stop cost him the victory as he was overtaken by Roger Reiman (Harley-Davidson) and relegated to second place. Nixon also led the 1966 Daytona 200 until he was passed by his Triumph teammate Buddy Elmore. A flat rear tire eventually relegated Nixon to ninth place. He ended the 1966 season ranked second to Bart Markel in the AMA final point standings.

The 1967 season marked the highpoint of Nixon's career. He began the year with a victory aboard a Yamaha in the 250cc Lightweight Class at Daytona. The next day he won the Daytona 200 after an intense, race-long battle for the lead with his Triumph teammate Dick Hammer. His impressive performance marked the first time that a competitor had swept both events at Daytona. He also won the Loudon Classic road race which was one of the oldest and most prestigious races on the AMA schedule. He won three road races, along with a short track and mile dirt track nationals in 1967 to clinch his first Grand National Championship. Nixon established a reputation as one of the best road racers in the AMA Grand National Championship.

The 1968 Grand National Championship was one of the most competitive in AMA history, featuring a season-long battle for the points lead between Nixon and Fred Nix (Harley-Davidson) that was not decided until the final race of the season at Ascot Park. Nixon won only two races all year compared to six victories for Nix however, he was able to score points consistently throughout the season to enter the final race of the season trailing Nix by nine points. He finished in fourth place, while Nix finished in seventh, allowing Nixon to win his second consecutive title in one of the championship's most memorable conclusions.

The AMA implemented a new rule in 1969 allowing five-speed transmissions which made two-stroke engines used by Japanese manufacturers more competitive. Yvon Duhamel won the pole position for the 1969 Daytona 200 riding a 350cc Yamaha two-stroke motorcycle to become the first rider to qualify for the event with a lap speed above 150 mph. His historic achievement marked the beginning of the two-stroke era in AMA road racing competitions. Despite Nixon's Triumph being underpowered, he still managed a credible ninth place at the Daytona 200. Nixon suffered a compound fracture of his left femur in 1969 when he crashed during a dirt track race in Santa Rosa, California. Nixon was renowned for his toughness and ability compete while injured however, after his serious leg injury, he decided to end his dirt track racing career to focus on road racing events.

Nixon won the Loudon Classic for the second time in 1970 enhancing his reputation as one of the best American road racers of the era. In October 1970, Nixon and Yvon Duhamel were invited to England to race in the Mallory Park Race of the Year, becoming the first AMA racers to compete in the prestigious event. He scored an fourth place result and left a positive impression on his British competitors.

The Transatlantic Trophy match races were inaugurated in 1971 pitting the best British riders against the top North American road racers on 750cc motorcycles in a six-race series. The races were held at Brands Hatch, Mallory Park and Oulton Park in England during the Easter holiday weekend. Nixon was named the American team captain but broke his wrist during practice at Brands Hatch which forced him to withdraw from the event. Nixon first met British racer Barry Sheene during the 1971 Transatlantic Trophy where the two competitors bonded and developed a lifelong friendship. For the remainder of his racing career, Sheene wore a Gary Nixon t-shirt beneath his leather riding suit as a good luck charm, winning two MotoGP World Championships in 1976 and 1977.

The season ending 1971 Champion Spark Plug Classic held at the Ontario Motor Speedway, was run in two 125-mile segments. The race featured the biggest purse in AMA racing history and attracted world-class riders such as Phil Read, Barry Sheene, Rod Gould and John Cooper. Nixon battled with Duhamel (Kawasaki) for the lead in the first heat, but the Kawasaki's fuel consumption forced Duhamel to make a pit stop for fuel, handing the victory to Nixon. Nixon was leading the second leg before he crashed due to oil on the track surface. In the 1971 AMA Grand National Championship, he failed to score any race victories as he dropped out of the top ten for the first time since 1963.

=== Road racing career ===
By 1972, the Triumph factory faced severe financial stress and went bankrupt, leaving Nixon without a sponsor. He then signed a contract to race for the Kawasaki road racing team alongside teammates Duhamel and Paul Smart wearing the team's trademark neon lime green racing livery. His first year with the Kawasaki team was plagued by mechanical failures and crashes while riding the newly-released H2R racing motorcycle.

Kawasaki hired Erv Kanemoto to be Nixon's race mechanic for the 1973 season marking the beginning of a successful partnership between the two men that continued until Nixon retired as a competitive racer in 1979. Nixon led the 1973 Daytona 200 only to retire when his engine seized but then won three consecutive road races on the AMA calendar with victories in Loudon, Laguna Seca and Pocono. At Ontario, Duhamel led a Kawasaki podium sweep with teammates Nixon and Art Baumann finishing second and third. Kawasaki's domination during this period led motorsports journalists to dub the team as "the Green Meanies", in reference to their lime green paint scheme. Nixon ended the 1973 Grand National Championship ranked third behind Kenny Roberts (Yamaha) and Gary Scott (Harley-Davidson) and was named the 1973 AMA Road Racing Champion. Despite their success, Nixon and Kanemoto struggled financially while racing for Kawasaki and decided to sign a contract to race for the Suzuki factory team in 1974.

Nixon was leading the 1974 Daytona by 11 seconds and appeared to be poised for victory when he crashed on the 37th lap, allowing Giacomo Agostini (Yamaha) to win the race. He recovered to win the 1974 Loudon Classic, marking the fourth time he had won the event. Barry Sheene lobbied Suzuki to allow Nixon to join the Suzuki MotoGP team at the 1974 Dutch TT however, Nixon was seriously injured while testing a Suzuki RG 500 in Japan and, was forced to miss the 1975 season while recovering from his injuries. The 1973 oil crisis severely impacted all forms of motorsports in the United States and Suzuki made the decision to withdraw their team from the AMA national championship at the end of the 1975 season, leaving Nixon without a job.

=== 1976 Formula 750 Controversy ===
Nixon and Kanemoto then decided to compete in the 1976 Formula 750 championship using a Kawasaki KR750 with a redesigned frame fabricated by Kanemoto. They began the season by finishing second to Johnny Cecotto (Yamaha) at the Daytona 200. At the following round held in Venezuela, Nixon initially appeared to have won the race until race organizers reversed the decision and awarded the victory to Steve Baker (Yamaha). During the race, Baker had experienced a mechanical problem and made a pit stop for adjustments. He returned to the circuit one lap behind but, directly in front of the race leaders. After the conclusion of the race, organizers announced that a scoring error had occurred and awarded Baker the victory. Nixon appealed the results to the FIM, but the appeal would not be heard until the conclusion of the season.

Nixon subsequently battled with Víctor Palomo (Yamaha) for the championship points lead until the end of the season with Palomo leading Nixon 61 to 47. If Nixon's appeal had been successful, the 15 points from winning the Venezuelan round would have given Nixon the world championship over Palomo by one point, 62 to 61. However, at the end of the season, an FIM Jury ruled that since race organizers failed to provide time sheets, the Venezuelan round failed to qualify for the World Championship, thus denying Nixon the chance to become the first American to win an FIM road racing world championship. Instead, Steve Baker became known as the first American road racing world champion when he won the 1977 Formula 750 championship. Nixon's performance in 1976 earned him the inaugural AMA Pro Athlete of the Year Award.

== Later life and death ==
After competing on a Yamaha TZ750 during the 1979 season, Nixon retired from competition at the age of 36. Nixon was inducted into the AMA Motorcycle Hall of Fame in 1998 and the Motorsports Hall of Fame of America in 2003. Kanemoto went on to win World Championships with riders Freddie Spencer and Eddie Lawson and was himself inducted into the Motorcycle Hall of Fame in 2001.

Nixon continued to race in historic motorsport events as a member of Team Obsolete in the AHRMA Historic National Series. At the age of 54, he once again claimed a victory at Daytona in the 1995 BMW Battle of the Legends class over fellow Hall of Fame member David Aldana. In 2005, Nixon rode a 1972 Triumph Trident to win the AHRMA Formula Vintage National Championship. 2006 MotoGP champion Nicky Hayden attended dirt-track races as a child where his father competed against Nixon. Nixon befriended the Hayden family and became an early supporter of the younger Hayden's motorcycle racing career.

Nixon operated a hobby shop specializing in radio-controlled cars and supported the local racing community by converting a building behind the hobby shop into the Cockeysville Astrodome Racers Club that allowed local racing enthusiasts race their radio-controlled cars against one another. He also tested motorcycles for the locally produced syndicated public television automotive review program MotorWeek.

At the age of 70, Nixon suffered a heart attack on July 29, 2011, and died on August 5 at the University of Maryland St. Joseph Medical Center in Towson, Maryland.
