= Gene Romero =

American motorcycle racer (1947–2019)

- Born: May 22, 1947; Martinez, California, U.S.
- Died: May 12, 2019 (aged 71); Fullerton, California, U.S.

Gene Romero (May 22, 1947 – May 12, 2019) was an American professional motorcycle racer. He competed in the A.M.A. Grand National Championship from 1966 to 1981 sponsored first by the Triumph factory racing team and then by the Yamaha factory racing team. Proficient on oval dirt tracks as well as paved road racing circuits, Romero won the 1970 A.M.A. Grand National Championship and was the winner of the 1975 Daytona 200. After retiring from competition, he became a successful racing team manager with Honda and helped the sport of dirt track racing by becoming a race promoter. Romero was inducted into the AMA Motorcycle Hall of Fame in 1998.

== Motorcycle racing career ==
=== Early career ===
Romero was born in Martinez, California to a Mexican immigrant father and a mother of German heritage. He grew up in San Luis Obispo, California where, with the help of his father he began competing at an early age in kart racing and Quarter Midget racing, as well as motorcycle racing. In 1964, he used a forged birth certificate to race professionally at Ascot Park riding a Triumph Tiger Cub. He adopted the nickname “Burritto”, spelling it with two Ts instead of the conventional spelling with one T. One source states that the nickname was given to him by motorcycle frame designer Ray Hensley while, another source states that veteran racer Neal Keen first used the nickname to tease the young upstart.

=== Triumph factory sponsorship ===
Romero's successful results earned him an expert status for the 1966 Grand National Championship and in 1967, he was hired to race for the Triumph factory racing team. The AMA Grand National Championship encompassed five distinct forms of competitions including mile dirt track races, half-mile, short-track, TT steeplechase and road races. Romero had a serious accident in 1967 in which he fractured his femur so badly that leg amputation was considered. However, after four months in a hospital, he was able to recover from his injuries and claimed his first Grand National victory at the 1968 Lincoln, Nebraska TT and finished the season ranked seventh in the Grand National Championship. Romero was meticulous in preparing his own machinery and, his efforts showed as he finished in 20 out of 25 races including, four third-place finishes and five second-place finishes during the 1969 national championship. One of his second-place finishes came at the Daytona 200 where, he rode a Triumph Trident to take the pole position with a record setting lap time of 157.342 mph, four and a half miles per hour faster than second place qualifier, Mark Brelsford. Despite not winning a single race, Romero ended the 1969 season ranked second in the nation behind Harley Davidson factory team rider Mert Lawwill.

=== National Championship season ===
The peak of Romero's career came in 1970 when he battled BSA teammates Jim Rice and Dick Mann for the national championship. He started the season finishing second at the Daytona 200 but, Rice surged to the championship lead with 6 victories. Romero continued to post consistent results and, his first victory of the year at the Sedalia, Missouri Mile race catapulted him into second place behind Rice in the championship. With only three races remaining on the schedule, Romero clinched the national championship with a victory at the Sacramento Mile while, Rice suffered a serious accident.

Romero's 1970 Sacramento Mile victory was filmed as part of the 1971 Bruce Brown motorcycle documentary film, On Any Sunday. The film was credited with helping to spark an explosive growth in American motorcycle sales numbers as the baby boomer generation came of age. He added his third national victory of the season the following week at the Gardena, California Half Mile race. At the age of 22, Romero became the youngest AMA Grand National Championship titleholder in the history of the sport.

In 1971, Romero raced against Dick Mann in a season-long battle for the Grand National Championship. He once again finished in second place at the Daytona 200 and won the San Jose Mile, the Oklahoma City Half Mile and the Nazareth One-Eighth Mile. The championship wasn't decided until the final race of the season when Mann finished ahead of Romero to secure the championship with Romero taking the runner-up position.

With the Triumph factory struggling financially, Romero received fewer parts and assistance than before and, his performance began to suffer as a result. He dropped to third in the 1972 championship with his lone victory coming at the San Jose Mile. He won the San Jose Mile for a third consecutive year in 1973 but, a seventh-place finish in the national championship marked his final year as a Triumph rider.

=== Move to Yamaha and Daytona 200 victory ===
In 1974, Romero accepted an offer to race for the Yamaha factory racing team as a teammate to Kenny Roberts and Don Castro. Along with two dirt track victories, he recorded his first road race victory at the prestigious Ontario 200 against an international field of competitors including fifteen-time world champion Giacomo Agostini, Barry Sheene and Teuvo Länsivuori as well as American riders such as Roberts. The race was run in two 100 mile legs with Romero winning the first race after Agostini crashed and Roberts settled for third place after making a poor tire selection. Roberts won the second leg but, Romero won the overall event by coming in second place ahead of Sheene.

It was during his tenure with the Yamaha team that Romero won the biggest race of his career when, he rode a Yamaha TZ750 to victory at the 1975 Daytona 200. Giacomo Agostini's 1974 Daytona victory had boosted the event's reputation to become one of the most prestigious motorcycle races in the world. Romero began the race riding conservatively as early leader Kenny Roberts retired with a mechanical failure. At the midway point of the race, he passed Steve Baker and Giacomo Agostini to take second place behind Steve McLaughlin. When McLaughlin crashed on the 30th lap, Romero took over the lead and held on for the victory by fifteen seconds over Baker. Despite his Daytona performance, he was released by Yamaha after the 1975 season as, the 1973 oil crisis precipitated a drop in sales of recreational vehicles, which forced motorcycle manufacturers to reduce their racing budgets. Yamaha chose to focus their support on Kenny Roberts.

=== Later career and death ===
In 1976, Romero competed under the sponsorship of motorcycle stunt man Evel Knievel. He helped to change professional motorcycle racing by being one of the first riders to seek sponsorship from outside the motorcycle industry from companies such as Ocean Pacific and Busch Beer. At the 1979 Transatlantic Trophy match race series which, pitted the best British riders against the top American road racers, Romero swept both races of the Oulton Park round, helping the American team secure the series victory. These were the final major victories in Romero's career. 1981 would be Romero's final season of racing competition.

After retiring from motorcycle competition, he briefly raced cars in Super Vees and USAC midgets before becoming the manager for the Honda factory dirt track team from 1984 to 1987. During that period, he guided Honda riders Ricky Graham and Bubba Shobert to four consecutive Grand National Championships. In the 1980s when the sport of motorcycle flat track racing was in a period of decline, Romero stepped in and became a race promoter, helping to keep the sport alive.

In a 16-year racing career, Romero won 12 AMA Nationals including the AMA Most Popular Rider of the Year Award in 1970. He competed in the Daytona 200 fourteen times, winning the event in 1975 and finishing second in 1970 and 1971. Romero was inducted into the Motorcycle Hall of Fame in 1998.

Romero died on May 12, 2019, in Fullerton, California of pneumonia and lung complications.

== Racing record ==
=== Complete USAC Mini-Indy Series results ===
Year	Entrant	1	2	3	4	5	6	7	8	9	10	Pos	Points
1978		PIR1	TRE1	MOS	MIL1	TEX	MIL2	OMS1	OMS2	TRE2	PIR2; 14	57th	5
