= Jim Rice (motorcyclist) =

US professional motorcycle racer

- Born: July 10, 1947 (age 79); Wooster, Ohio
- Occupation: Motorcycle racer
- Website: www.johnricemx.com

Jim Rice (born July 10, 1947) is an American former professional motorcycle racer who is an inductee of both the AMA Motorcycle Hall of Fame and the TrailBlazers Hall of Fame. During his career in the late 1960s and early 1970s, he won 12 national races and finished in the top-ten of the championship three times. All but one of his victories were on BSA machines. Footage of Rice's crash in qualifying for the 1970 Sacramento Mile was used in Bruce Brown's film On Any Sunday.

== Early life ==
Rice was born on July 10, 1947, in Wooster, Ohio. As a teenager Rice started working on and driving drag cars at West Salem's Dragway 42. When he was 16 he moved to Palo Alto, California, and brought a 50 cc Honda. This was soon replaced with a 250 cc scrambler. Rice started taking part in local scrambles on a friend's Yamaha YDS2. After getting a job in a BSA dealer, Rice brought a BSA Spitfire Hornet, which he found far easier to ride in scrambles.

== Racing career ==
AMA National Wins
| Year | Race | Machine |
|---|---|---|
| 1973 | Columbus Half-mile | Harley Davidson |
| 1972 | San Jose Mile | BSA |
| 1972 | Colorado Springs Mile | BSA |
| 1970 | Peoria TT | BSA |
| 1970 | Santa Rosa Mile | BSA |
| 1970 | San Jose Half-mile | BSA |
| 1970 | Reading Half-mile | BSA |
| 1970 | Palmetto Half-mile | BSA |
| 1970 | Houston TT | BSA |
| 1969 | Oklahoma City Half-mile | BSA |
| 1969 | Sedalia Mile | BSA |
| 1969 | San Jose Half-mile | BSA |

Rice began riding in some pro-events in 1966 to gain points towards getting a professional licence. In 1967 he obtained his amateur licence and became the top points scoring rider in AMA District 36 (Northern California). He was also top scorer at Hayward Speedway, who presented him with a 7 feet high trophy in recognition of his achievements. By 1968 he had become one of the top amateur winning several amateur nationals.

Having become expert in 1969, Rice won three national events in his rookie season. The first win was at his home race, the San Jose Half-Mile.

1970 was Rice's most successful season winning six national races and finishing second in the championship. The AMA had decided to award points for races in proportion to the prize fund for 1970. This meant more points were awarded for road races than other races. (The AMA reverted to the previous system of equal points in 1971). Heading into the pre-penultimate round, the Sacramento Mile, Rice was leading the championship from Gene Romero 534 points to 521, despite Rice having won six events and Romeo one. Rice crashed in practice breaking his nose. Footage of the crash was used in the film On any Sunday. Romero won the race and Rice finished 15th. Winning the race gave Romero a lead of 57 points over Rice. The two remaining races, Gardenia and Oklahoma City, were only worth 26 points each for a win, so Romero was now unbeatable in the Championship.

In 1971, Rice was captain of the American BSA racing team and a member of the American team that participated in the 1971 Anglo-American Match Races. He also participated in an AMA road safety campaign that was broadcast on radio and tv stations in America. Rice was elected as a rider's representative on the AMA Competitions Congress in 1971.

Rice won two events in 1972, his home race of the San Jose Mile and the Colorado Springs Mile, where he finished the race with a broken shoulder after clipping the inside barrier. He finished sixth in the championship that season.

Harley-Davidson offered Rice a ride for 1973 which he accepted. He won at the Columbus Half-mile race, at which many of his childhood friends had attended to see him ride.

Rice retired from racing at the end of the 1974 season and was inducted into the AMA Motorcycle Hall of Fame in September 2001.
