= Don Emde =

American motorcycle racer (born 1951)

Don Emde (born February 16, 1951, in San Diego, California) is an American motorcycle racer, author and publisher. In 1972 he won the Daytona 200 motorcycle race in only 56 laps. In 1999, he was inducted to the American Motorcyclist Association's Motorcycle Hall of Fame, and in 2011, was inducted to the Sturgis Motorcycle Museum & Hall of Fame.

== Racing moments ==
Emde's 1972 victory at Daytona as a privateer was the first win at that race for a Yamaha, the smallest displacement racebike to take first place, the first victory for any two-stroke, and the first (and only) father-son win at Daytona (his father Floyd Emde won in 1948).

Emde retired from racing in 1973 and became an author and magazine publisher.

In May, 2014, Emde organized a recreation of Erwin "Cannonball" Baker's 1914 transcontinental motorcycle ride, on its 100th anniversary.

== Bibliography ==
- Emde, Don (1991), Daytona 200: History of America’s Premier Motorcycle Race, Don Emde Productions, ISBN 0962743402
