= David Aldana =

American motorcycle racer

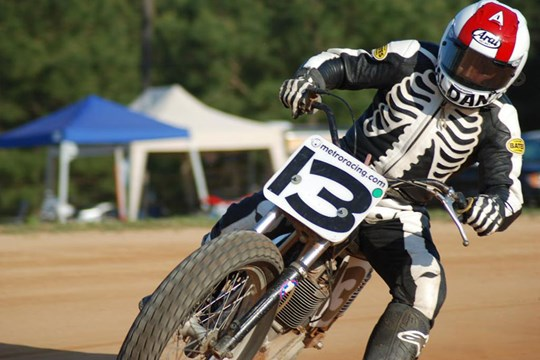
David Aldana in 2015

David Aldana (born November 26, 1949) is an American former professional motorcycle racer who specialized in dirt track oval racing and road racing. In the 1970s, he was one of the more colorful racers in the A.M.A. Grand National Championship with his wild riding style and extravagant designs on his riding attire. Aldana competed in nearly every form of motorcycle racing, including competing in the 1970 Trans-AMA motocross series and speedway racing.

Born in Santa Ana, California, Aldana became a rookie expert on the AMA Grand National circuit in 1970 riding for BSA. Aldana made a serious challenge for the championship. A crash at the Sacramento Mile with just three races to go dashed his hopes for the title, but along the way he won three nationals and finished third in the series. He won over many fans with his all-or-nothing style. He also gained notoriety from wearing a set of racing leathers he designed that featured an almost entirely black leather suit with a contrasting human skeleton on the front. AMA race officials threatened to ban him at one point if he persisted in wearing the suit.

By the late 1970s, Aldana began concentrating on road racing. In 1975, he was the top individual scorer at the Transatlantic Trophy match races, and led the American team to their first victory in the series over the British team. He became a factory rider for Suzuki, and later joined Kawasaki's AMA Superbike team in 1980 with a young Eddie Lawson as his teammate. He went on to be a Honda factory rider in the FIM Endurance World Championship where he raced in prestigious races such as the Bol d'Or. Aldana teamed with Mike Baldwin to win the prestigious Suzuka 8 Hours endurance race in 1981.

Aldana won four AMA Nationals during his career, as well as several important international races. In 1999, he was inducted into the AMA Motorcycle Hall of Fame.

== Career statistics ==
=== Suzuka 8 Hours results ===
| Year | Team | Co-Rider | Bike | Pos |
|---|---|---|---|---|
| 1981 | Honda France | (United States) David Aldana (United States) Mike Baldwin | Honda RS1000 | 1st |
