= Kawasaki KR500 =

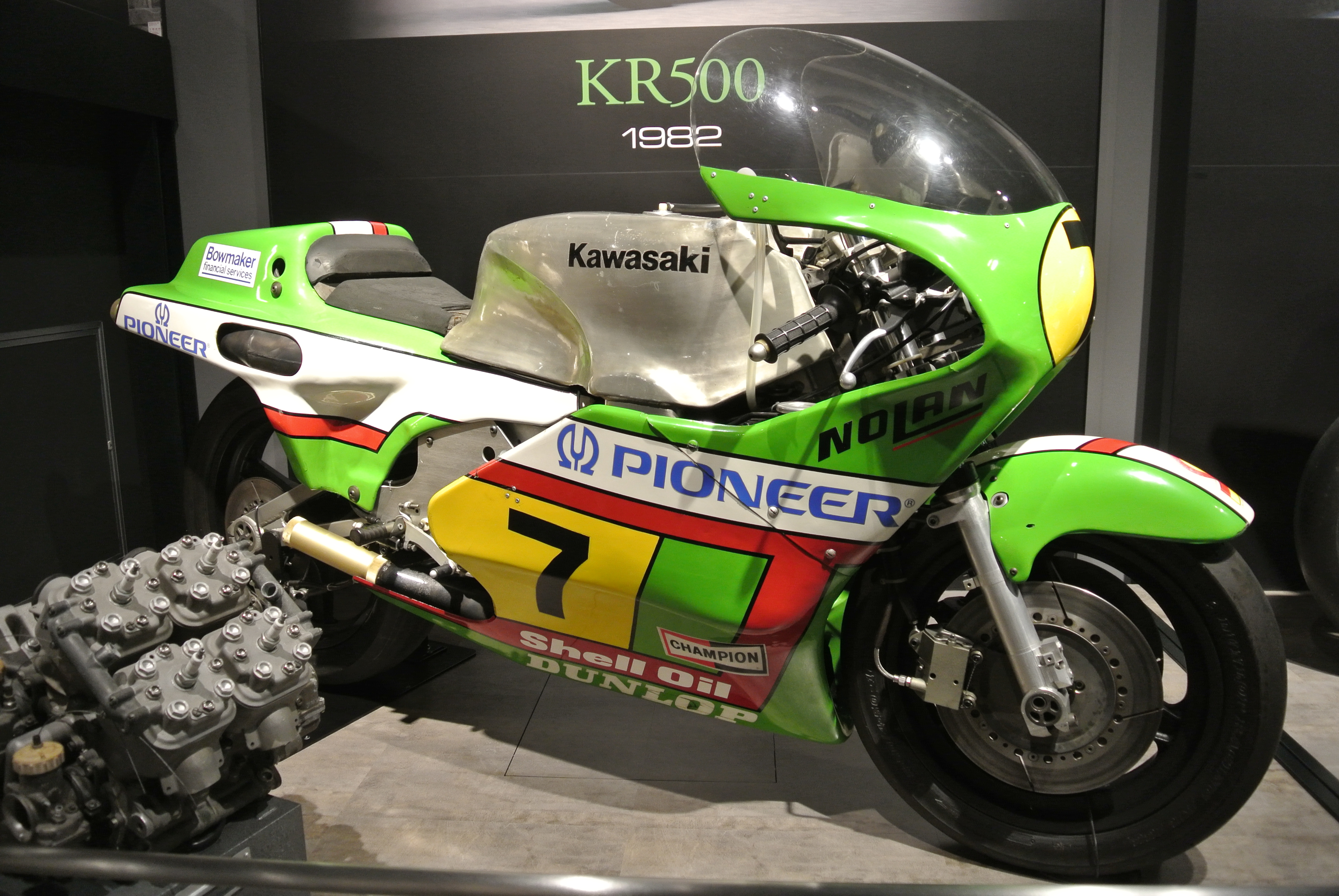
- Kawasaki KR500 (1982)
- Manufacturer: Kawasaki
- Production: 1980–1982
- Predecessor: Kawasaki H1R
- Successor: Kawasaki Ninja ZX-RR
- Class: Grands Prix racing (500 cc class)
- Engine: 494.7 cc (30.19 cu in) square four, two stroke, liquid cooled
- Bore / stroke: 54.0 mm × 54.0 mm (2.13 in × 2.13 in)
- Top speed: 180 mph (290 km/h) depending on gearing
- Power: 120 hp (89 kW)
- Transmission: six speed, dry clutch
- Frame type: aluminium monocoque
- Suspension: Front 38 mm Kayaba telescopic forks Rear single shock Kayaba
- Brakes: Front Dual 290 mm (11 in) discs with Kawasaki magnesium twin piston calipers Rear Single 230 mm (9.1 in) disc with Kawasaki magnesium twin piston caliper
- Tires: front 16 x 3.00 inch, Dymag wheel rear 18 x 4.00 inch, Dymag wheel
- Wheelbase: 1,450 mm (57 in)
- Weight: 133 kg (293 lb) (dry); 150 kg (330 lb) (wet)
- Fuel capacity: 32 L
- Related: Kawasaki KR250; Kawasaki KR750

The Kawasaki KR500 was a racing motorcycle manufactured by Kawasaki from 1980 to 1982 for competition in the Grand Prix motorcycle racing series. The motorcycle was powered by a 494 cc two stroke engine, and used an aluminium monocoque frame, similar to the 1979 Honda NR500 racer, aimed at improving aerodynamics with a small frontal area, improving chassis stiffness and reducing weight.

== Model history ==
The motorcycle was debuted during the 1980 world championship ridden by Kork Ballington at the Nations Grand Prix held on the Misano circuit. At the season-end the South African rider finished 12th in the standings.

For the 1981 world championship the KR500 was improved with a stiffer and lighter chassis along with a magnesium crankcase and anti-dive front suspension. The season saw the KR500 get its first podium finishes with third places at the Dutch TT and at the Finnish Grand Prix and, Ballington placed eighth in the 500cc world championship.

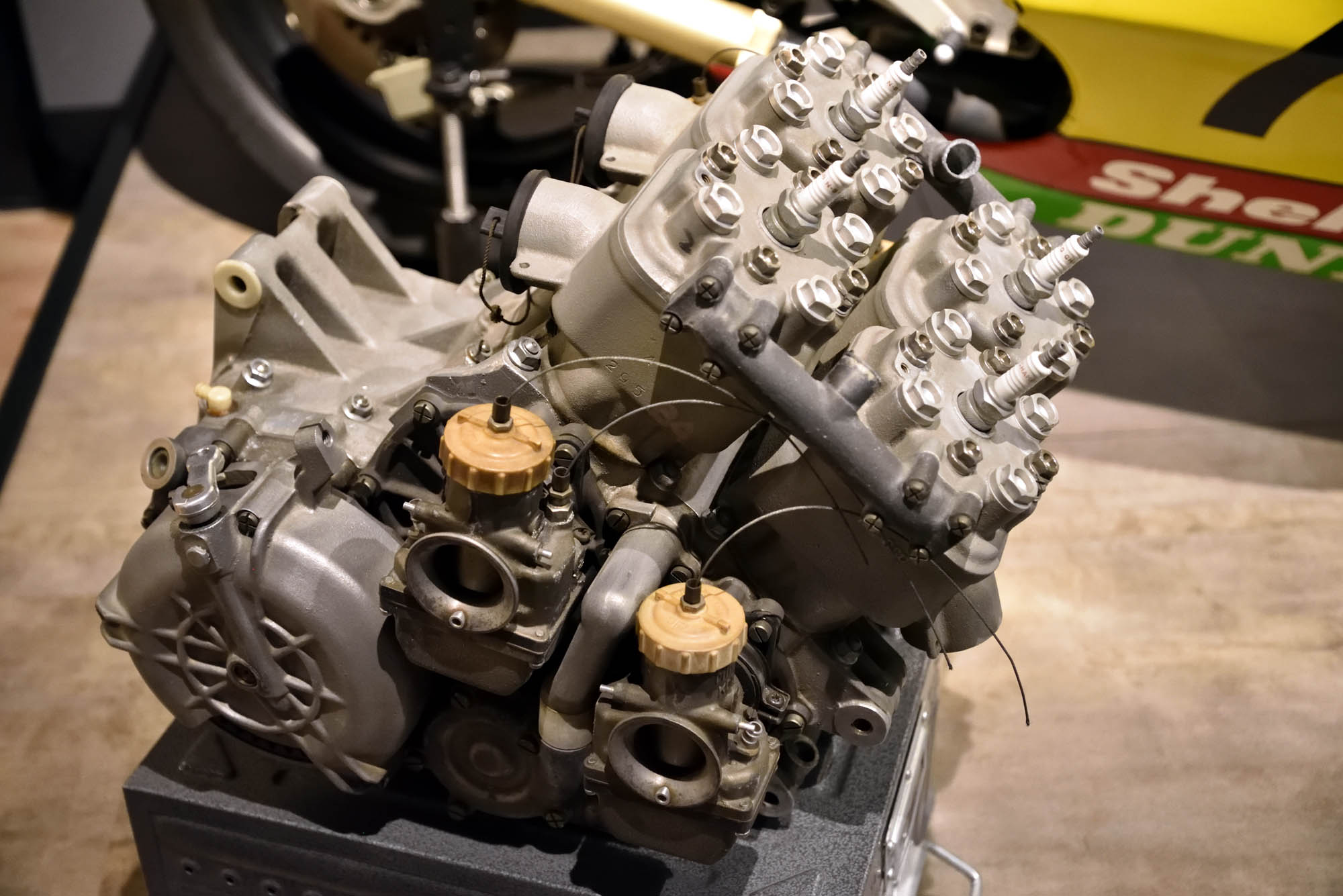
KR500 engine

The main change before the 1982 season was switching to Showa suspension. Ballington finished 9th in the championship, with a best result during the season of 6th place at the 1982 Nations Grand Prix. The KR500 was more successful competing in the 1982 ACU 500cc British national championship where, Ballington won six consecutive races to win the title for Kawasaki.

After three years of development, Kawasaki had failed to close the technological gap with its rival Japanese manufacturers Honda and Yamaha. The 1982 model was powerful but, still too heavy in comparison to the competition. At the end of the season the Kawasaki withdrew from Grand Prix motorcycle racing due to lack of successful results.

== Frame ==
Ossa in the late 1960s successfully raced a 250 cc Grand Prix bike with a welded-sheet magnesium alloy monocoque frame, withdrawing after the death of their rider Santiago Herrero. In 2000 Kawasaki released the ZX-12R, the first production motorcycle with an aluminium monocoque frame, followed by the 2006 ZX-14, and the 2008 Concours 14 also with this type of frame.

== See also ==
- Honda NR500
- Honda RC181
- Honda RC174
- Suzuki RG 500
- Yamaha YZR500
- MV Agusta 500 Four
