= Honda NR500 =

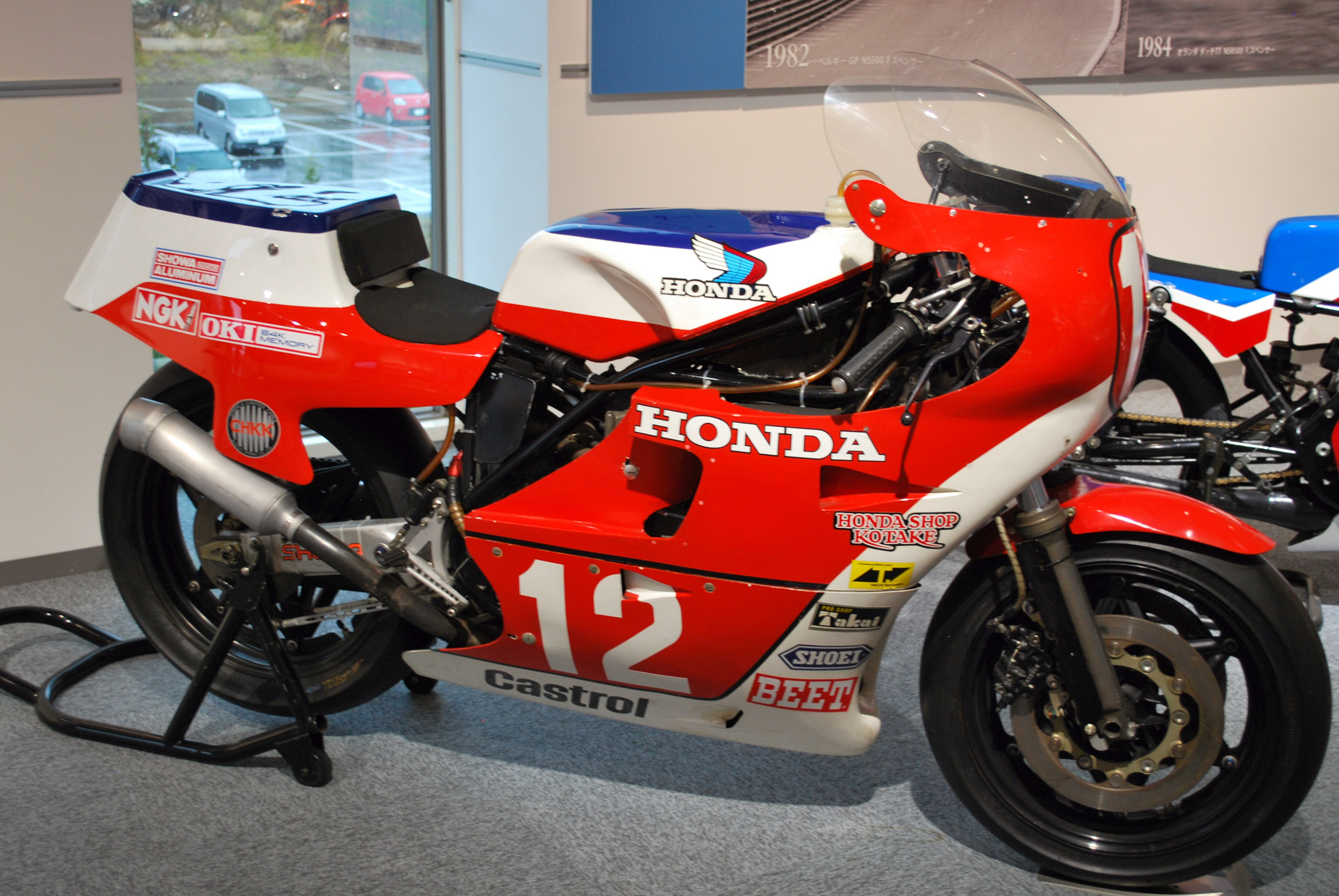
- 1982 Honda NR500
- Manufacturer: Honda Racing Corporation
- Production: 1979–1981
- Successor: Honda NS500
- Engine: 499 cc 4-stroke 100° V4 oval-piston Individual gear driven cam banks per cylinder.
- Bore / stroke: 93.4 mm / 41 mm × 36 mm (3.7 in / 1.6 in × 1.4 in)
- Power: 1979: 100 hp (74.6 kW) @ 16,000 rpm 1983: 130 hp (96.9 kW) @ 19,500 rpm
- Transmission: 1980-83 used a 6 Speed Transmission First Slipper clutch implemented on a motorcycle, known as a back torque limiter.
- Related: Honda NR

NR500 was a racing motorcycle developed by Honda HRC in 1979 to compete in Grand Prix motorcycle racing. "NR" stands for "New Racing".

== Model history ==
The motivation behind the NR500 was company founder Soichiro Honda's desire to compete using four-stroke engine technology since the majority of motorcycles manufactured by Honda used four-stroke engines. When the FIM announced new regulations for the 1968 Grand Prix motorcycle racing season that limited the 500 cc engines to four cylinders, this gave an advantage to teams using two-stroke machinery. Honda decided to withdraw from motorcycle racing to concentrate on its automobile division.

In November 1977 Honda announced it would be returning to motorcycle Grand Prix racing using four-stroke technology. Even though two-stroke engines dominated motorcycle Grand Prix racing in the late 1970s, Honda felt compelled to race what they sold and thus competed using a high-technology, four-stroke race bike. Since a conventional four-stroke, four-cylinder engine could not produce the same power as its two-stroke rivals, Honda increased its valve area to be competitive.

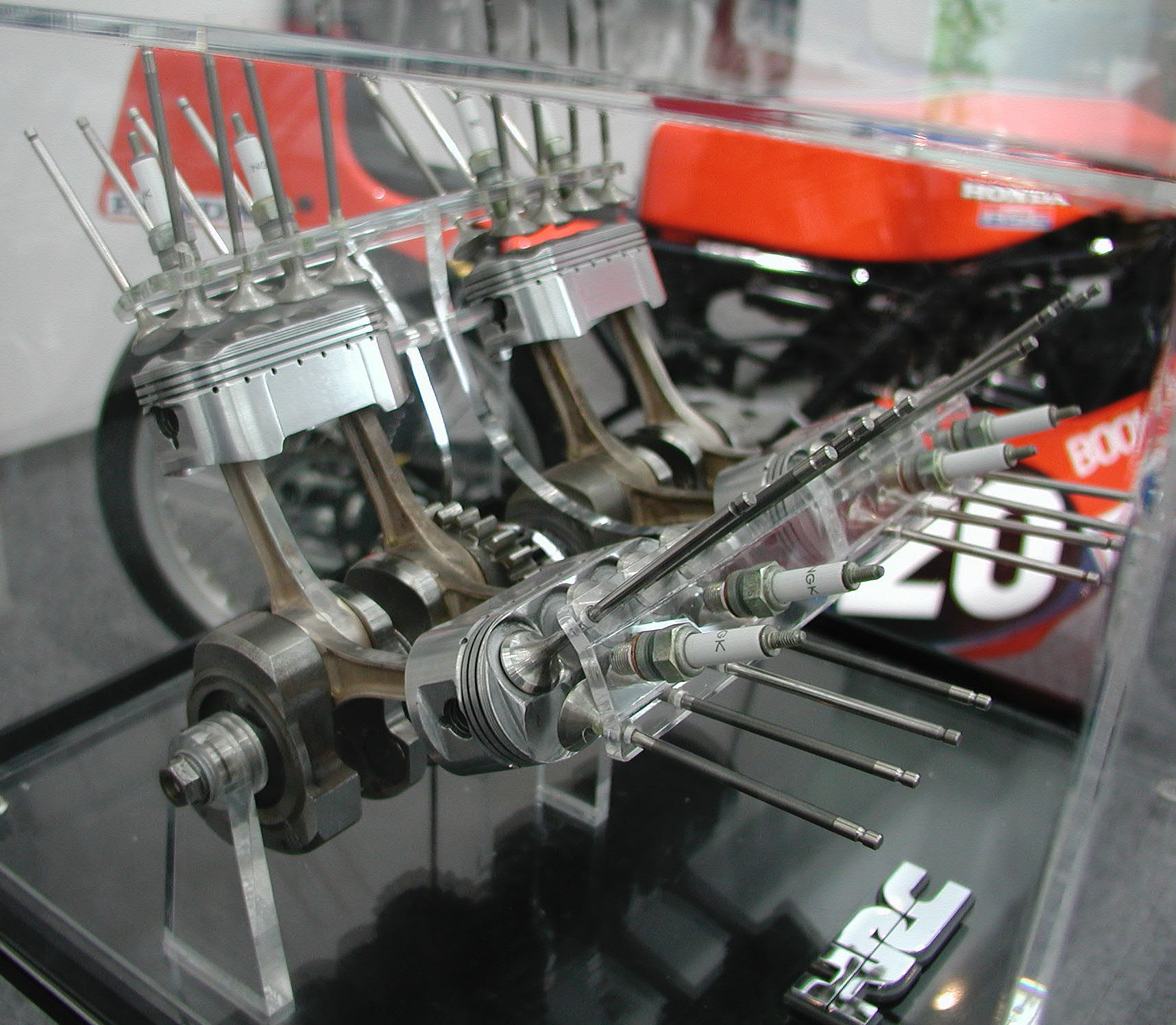
Oval pistons, piston rings and dual-conrods

The rules at the time allowed up to four combustion chambers, so Honda designed a 32-valve V8 with four pairs of linked combustion chambers. This then evolved into an engine with four oval-shaped cylinders. The oval cylinders allowed room for 32 valves and eight spark plugs, the same as that of an eight-cylinder engine while staying within the four-cylinder rules limit. Another innovation used on the NR500 was its monocoque body which wrapped around the engine like a cocoon and helped reduce weight. In an effort to reduce drag, lower the center of gravity, and to lower gyroscopic forces, the bike used 16-inch Comstar wheels instead of the mainstream 18-inch versions that were commonplace at the time.

Honda overcame significant manufacturing problems to develop its oval cylinder technology and by late-1979 the bike made its debut at the British Grand Prix ridden by Mick Grant and Takazumi Katayama. Both bikes retired, Grant crashing on the first turn after the bike spilled oil onto his rear tire, sliding along with the bike showering sparks, requiring rapid application of powder fire retardant from the race marshal. Katayama retired on the seventh lap due to ignition problems when running second-last. Honda persevered for two more seasons, but never made the bike competitive. The monocoque frame had to be abandoned because it made it too difficult for mechanics to work on the engine during races. The 16-inch wheels also had to be abandoned for 18-inch wheels. American Freddie Spencer was able to reach fifth place at the 1981 British Grand Prix before the bike broke down. The NR500 never won a Grand Prix. A thirteenth place by Katayama at the 1981 Austrian Grand Prix was its best showing.

Honda abandoned the project and designed the NS500 two-stroke bike to compete in the 1982 season. Spencer would ride the NS500 to Honda's first 500 cc world championship in 1983. Ultimately, what doomed the NR500 project was that Honda had tried to develop too many technologies at one time. The NR500 did experience a few successes: Freddie Spencer rode the NR500 to a heat race victory at Laguna Seca in 1981 and Kengo Kiyama won the Suzuka 200 kilometer race that same year.

== See also ==
- Kawasaki KR500
- Honda RC181
- Honda RC174
- Suzuki RG 500
- Yamaha YZR500
- MV Agusta 500 Four
