= Giacomo Agostini =

Italian motorcycle racer (born 1942)

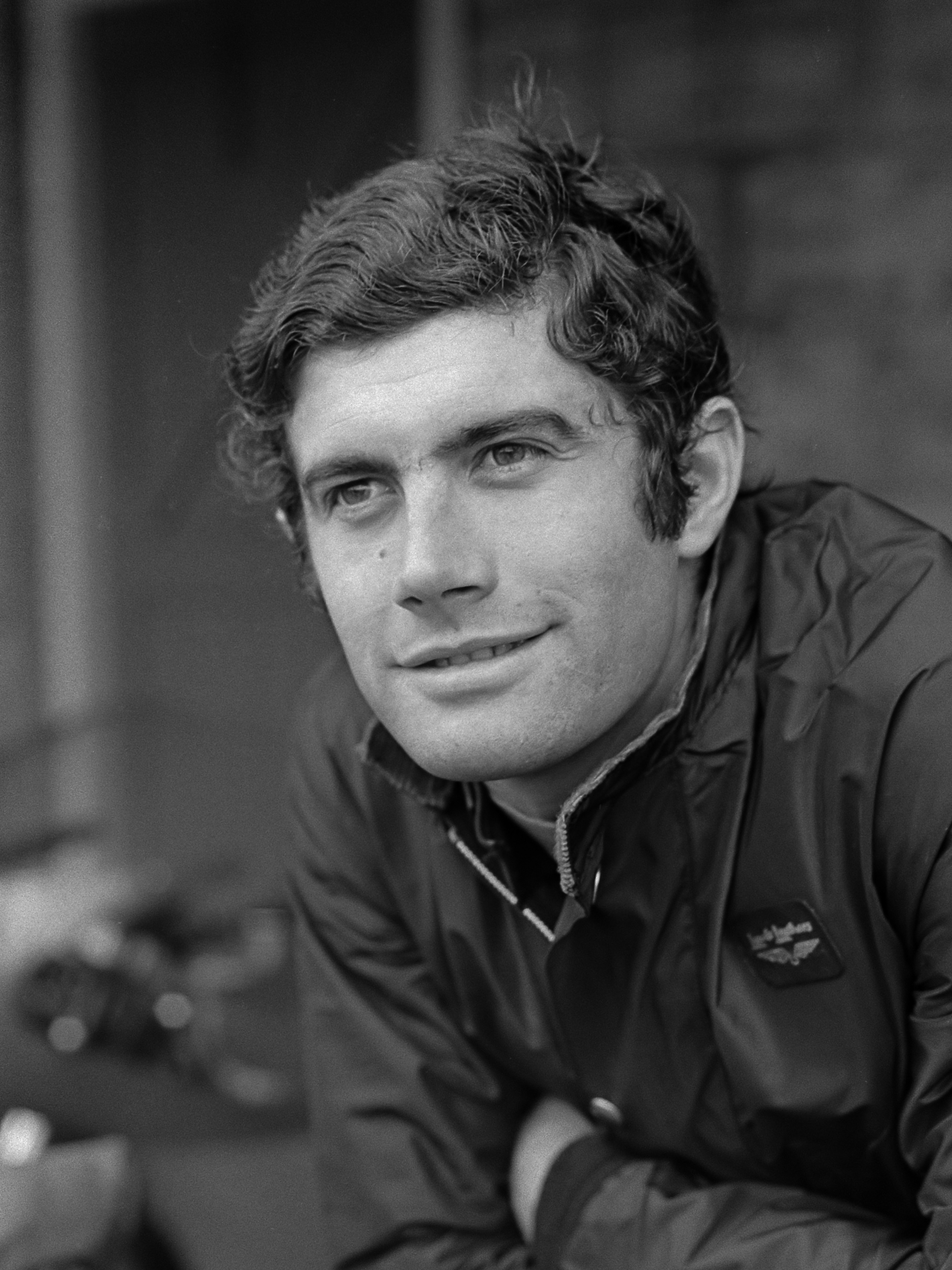
- Agostini in 1968 at the age of 26
- Nationality: Italian
- Born: 16 June 1942 (age 84); Brescia, Kingdom of Italy
Motorcycle racing career statistics
Grand Prix motorcycle racing
| Active years | 1964 – 1977 |
| First race | 1963 250cc Nations Grand Prix |
| Last race | 1977 500cc British Grand Prix |
| First win | 1965 350cc German Grand Prix |
| Last win | 1976 500cc German Grand Prix |
| Team(s) | MV Agusta, Yamaha, Suzuki |
| Championships | 350cc – 1968, 1969, 1970, 1971, 1972, 1973, 1974; 500cc – 1966, 1967, 1968, 1969, 1970, 1971, 1972, 1975 |
Starts / Wins / Podiums / Poles / F. laps / Points; 207 / 122 / 159 / 6 / 117 / 1583
Isle of Man TT career
| TTs contested | 8 (1965 – 1972) |
| TT wins | 10 |
| First TT win | 1966 Junior TT |
| Last TT win | 1972 Senior TT |
| TT podiums | 13 |

British Formula One Championship career
- Active years: 1979–1980
- Entries: 23
- Championships: 0
- Wins: 0
- Podiums: 7
- Career points: 41
- Pole positions: 0
- Fastest laps: 0

Giacomo Agostini (Italian pronunciation: [ˈdʒaːkomo aɡoˈstiːni]; born 16 June 1942) is an Italian former professional motorcycle road racer and racing team manager. He competed in the FIM Grand Prix motorcycle racing World Championships from 1963 to 1977, most prominently as a member of the MV Agusta factory racing team. Agostini was the preeminent motorcycle racer of the late 1960s and early 1970s, amassing 122 Grand Prix victories and 15 World Championships, the most by any competitor in the history of Grand Prix motorcycle racing. He won seven consecutive 500cc World Championships with MV Agusta between 1966 and 1972, with an eighth in 1975, plus seven consecutive 350cc world championships between 1968 and 1974. Agostini was also a ten-time winner of the Isle of Man TT.

Agostini's rivalry with Mike Hailwood early in his career dominated Grand Prix motorcycle racing in the 1960s and culminated in their dramatic duel for the 1967 World Championship. Although critics claimed that Agostini raced for much of his career aboard the dominant MV Agusta against fields composed of privateer racers, he had to race during an era when rider deaths were commonplace. He competed on racetracks lined with deadly metal barriers or on street circuits that featured railroad crossings and hay bales wrapped around telephone poles. When Agostini boycotted the Isle of Man TT race in 1973, the most prestigious race of the year at the time, his influential status as the reigning champion led to the removal of the event from the World Championships four years later and marked the beginning of an era of increased safety for riders.

After his motorcycle racing career, Agostini briefly attempted to race automobiles, but at the age of 35, perhaps waited too long to make the switch, and he was not able to replicate the success that he had experienced on motorcycles. He then turned to the role of racing team manager for the Yamaha and Cagiva factory teams during the 1980s and 1990s. With handsome features and a charming demeanor, Agostini was popular with motorsports enthusiasts and became a film star in his native Italy. In 1999, Agostini was inducted into the AMA Motorcycle Hall of Fame. In 2000, he was inducted into the MotoGP Hall of Fame, and in 2010, he was named an FIM Legend for his motorcycling achievements.

== Motorsports career ==
=== Early life ===
Agostini was born in Brescia, Lombardy, and grew up in Lovere, where his father was the owner of a Bergamo transport company that operated ferries on Lake Iseo. The oldest of four brothers, Agostini initially had to steal away to compete, first in hill climb events and then in road racing, as his father did not approve of his son's motorcycle racing career and did everything he could to persuade him not to race.

Eventually, his father came to terms with his racing, and at the age of 21, Agostini won the 1963 Italian 175cc championship, riding a Moto Morini. He got his break when Morini factory rider Tarquinio Provini left the team to ride for Benelli. Count Alfonso Morini hired the young Agostini to ride for him. In 1964, Agostini won the Italian 350cc title and scored his first World Championship points with a fourth place at the West German Grand Prix. He followed this result with another fourth place in the Nations Grand Prix at Monza.

=== MV Agusta team ===
These results caught the eye of Count Domenico Agusta, who signed Agostini in 1965 to ride for the MV Agusta factory racing team as Mike Hailwood's teammate. In his first race for the MV Agusta team, he beat Hailwood to win the 350cc West German Grand Prix held at the daunting, 14.2-mile-long (22.9 km) Nürburgring circuit. Agostini then fought a season-long battle with Honda's Jim Redman for the 1965 350cc world championship. He led the final round in Japan at Suzuka and appeared poised to win the title when a mechanical failure forced him to withdraw from the race, handing the title to Redman. In the 500 class, Hailwood dominated the season to win his fourth consecutive World Championship for the MV Agusta team, while Agostini finished the season in second place.

Hailwood had grown weary of working for the mercurial Count Agusta and left to join Redman on the Honda factory racing team for the 1966 season, leaving Agostini as MV Agusta's top rider. Honda increased their racing activities in 1966 by competing in all five displacement classes, including new Honda RC181 motorcycles for Redman and Hailwood to compete in the premier 500cc class. Although the Honda motorcycles were powerful, they lacked the road-handling capabilities of the MV Agusta motorcycles. The MV Agusta team countered the increasing strength of the Honda team by manufacturing the new MV Agusta 500 Triple for Agostini.

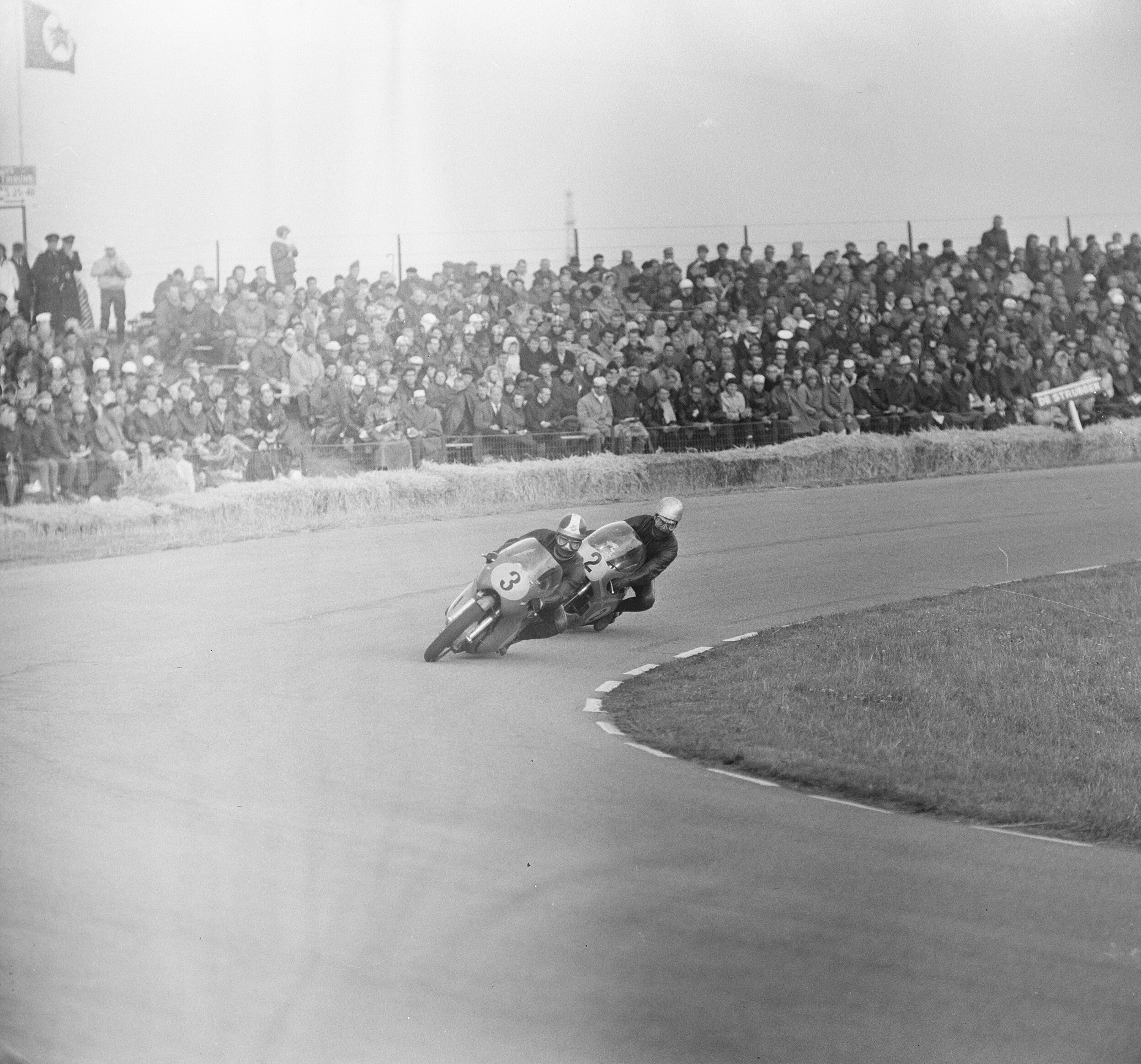
Agostini (3) pursued by Jim Redman (2) during the 1966 500cc Dutch TT.

=== Hailwood rivalry ===
The 1966 season began with Redman winning the first two races in West Germany and Holland but he then suffered a broken wrist at the 500cc Belgian Grand Prix, which forced him to miss the remainder of the season. Agostini and Hailwood then competed for the championship points lead until the final race of the season in Monza. Hailwood was leading the final race when his motorcycle had a mechanical failure, which allowed Agostini to win the race and become the first Italian 500cc World Champion since Libero Liberati (Gilera) in 1957. His 1966 World Championship marked the first of seven consecutive 500cc World Championships with the MV Agusta team. In the 350 class, he once again finished the season in second place behind Hailwood riding the six-cylinder Honda RC174. 1966 marked the first of Agostini's ten victories at the Isle of Man when he won the Junior TT and also set his first TT lap record. Agostini won the prestigious, non-championship 1966 Mallory Park Race of the Year invitational when Hailwood suffered a mechanical failure while leading the race on his six-cylinder Honda.

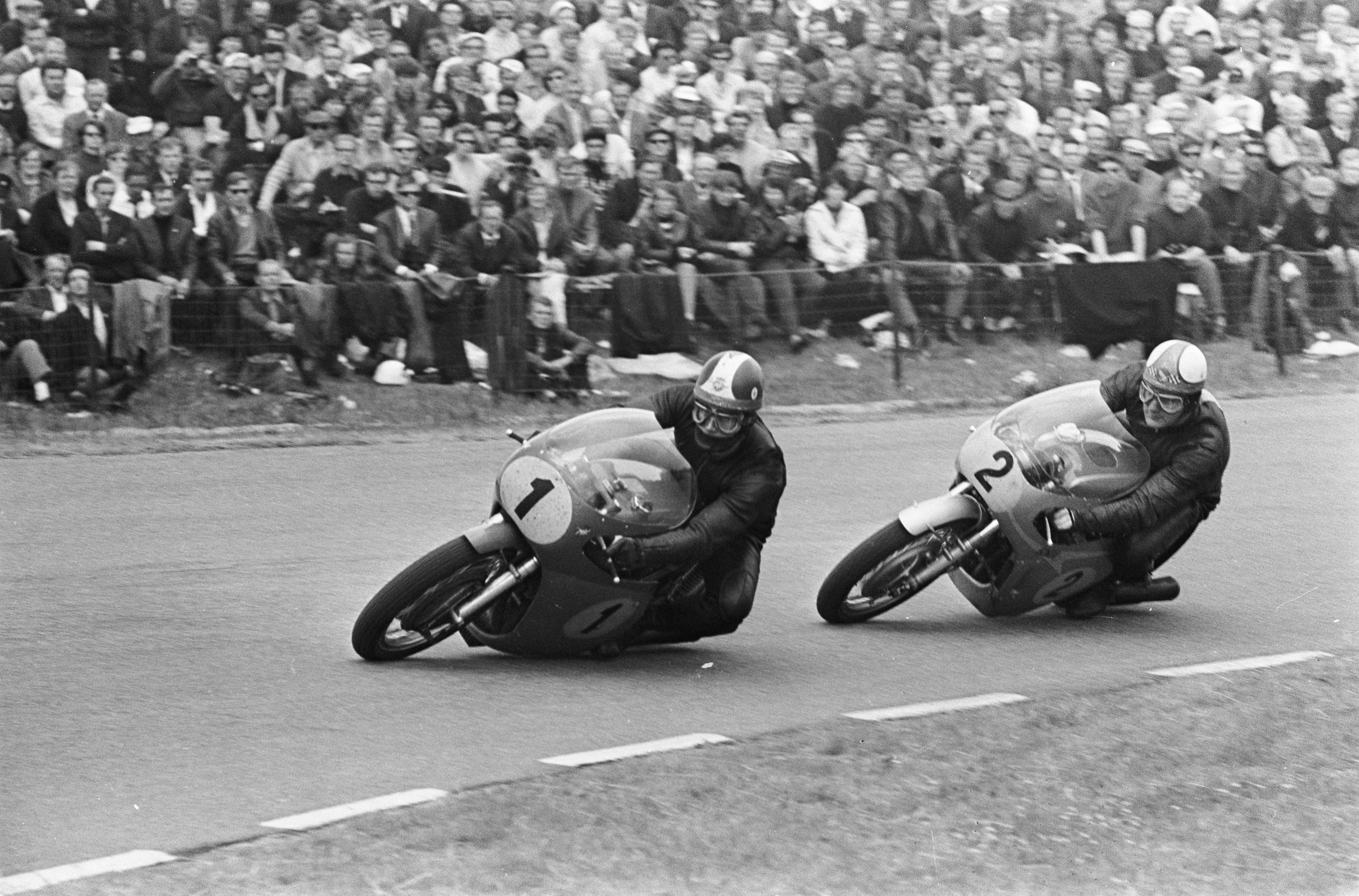
Agostini (1) and Mike Hailwood (2) dueling during the 1967 500cc Dutch TT.

Agostini and Hailwood engaged in a fierce competition for the 1967 500cc World Championship, including a dramatic duel at the 1967 Isle of Man TT where the two competitors were in a dead heat on the final lap of the race when a broken roller chain on Agostini's motorcycle forced him to withdraw from the event. By the penultimate round in Italy, both competitors had won four races apiece. In the 500cc Nations Grand Prix, Hailwood had built a 17-second lead over Agostini, but four laps from the finish, he was forced to slow down with gearbox trouble which allowed Agostini to overtake him and win the race.

The championship was not decided until the final race of the year at the Mosport Circuit in Canada, where Hailwood won to tie Agostini on points. Each rider had five Grand Prix victories, so the tiebreaker came down to second places — Agostini taking the title with three seconds to Hailwood's two. For the third consecutive season, he finished the 350 championship in second place as Hailwood and the Honda RC174 dominated the season with six victories. Hailwood also defeated Agostini at the non-championship 1967 Mallory Park Race of the Year.

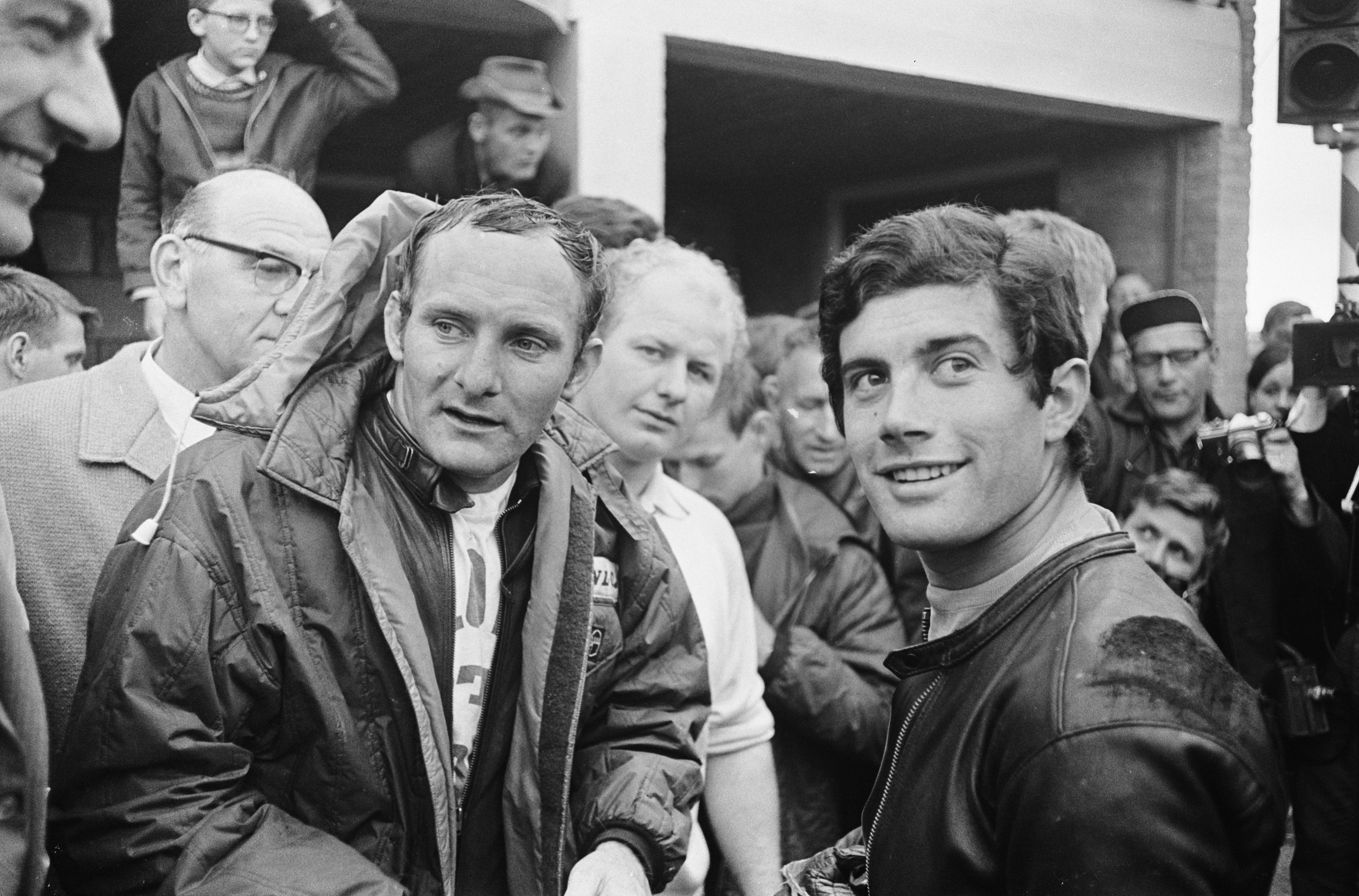
Mike Hailwood (L) and Agostini at the 1967 Dutch TT

The FIM implemented new rules for the 1968 season, limiting all gearboxes to six-speeds, 125cc and 250cc motorcycles to no more than two cylinders, and 350cc and 500cc motorcycles to four cylinders. The new rules favored two-stroke engines over four-stroke engines in the smaller displacement classes, and since the Honda factory had a company policy to race only four-stroke motorcycles, they decided to withdraw from motorcycle racing to concentrate on Formula 1 racing.

Hailwood would also retire from motorcycle racing to pursue a career in Formula 1 racing. Although Hailwood was Agostini's greatest rival, the two men remained friends and held mutual respect for one another. Agostini considered Hailwood to be the best rider he ever raced against. After Hailwood died from injuries sustained in a traffic accident in 1981, Agostini served as a pallbearer at his funeral.

=== MV Agusta domination ===
In the wake of Honda's withdrawal, the MV Agusta team faced little opposition in the larger displacement classes from any major manufacturers, competing against privateer racers using ageing machinery. Agostini swept the 350 and 500 class championships in 1968 to claim his first double World Championship. From 1968 to 1970, Agostini and MV Agusta were so dominant that Agostini won every single race he contested in the 350cc and 500cc classes. He was briefly challenged in 1969 by former 125 World Champion Bill Ivy riding a 350cc Jawa two-stroke, V-four engined motorcycle. Ivy led Agostini at the 1969 350cc Dutch TT before finishing in second place. Two weeks later, Ivy was killed in an accident during practice at the Sachsenring. Hailwood was lured out of retirement to compete in the 1969 Mallory Park Race of the Year riding a 500cc Seeley motorcycle, but it proved uncompetitive and Agostini was able to win his second Race of the Year crown.

In a harbinger of the future, Ginger Molloy rode a two-stroke Kawasaki H1R to finish second to Agostini in the 1970 500 class, as Japanese manufacturers continued to improve two-stroke technology. After the death of Count Agusta in February 1971, MV Agusta's focus turned to the aviation industry. The Count's passion for motorcycle racing had been the driving force behind the MV Agusta team, and without his presence, the racing team's importance within the company began to wither.

Agostini's record setting winning streak ended at the 1971 Isle of Man TT when his MV Agusta broke down on the first lap of the Junior TT. By that point, he had won 58 consecutive races, including 26 in the 350cc class and 32 in the 500cc class. In 1971, he won his tenth World Championship to surpass the previous record of nine set by Carlo Ubbiali and Mike Hailwood.

At the 1971 Mallory Park Race of the Year, Agostini faced a field of top-ranked competitors including Phil Read, Rod Gould, Gary Nixon, Jarno Saarinen, Paul Smart and a teenage Barry Sheene. As the reigning World Champion, he was favored to win the race, but was upset by John Cooper riding a BSA Rocket 3. The two competitors engaged in a dramatic race-long battle for the lead before Cooper crossed the finish line just three-fifths of a second ahead of Agostini.

=== Isle of Man TT boycott ===
When Agostini's close friend Gilberto Parlotti died in an accident while competing in the 1972 TT, he announced he would never again compete in the event, as he considered the 37.73-mile circuit unsafe for world championship competition. At the time, the Isle of Man TT was the most prestigious race on the international motorcycle racing calendar, and his stature as the reigning World Champion gave the announcement an immense impact on the sport.

Agostini's decision to boycott the event had far-reaching consequences for the TT and would lead to a walk-out of the top Grand Prix stars, many of whom resorted to severe criticism of the organisation and safety at the event, with people such as Phil Read in the vanguard of the critics. In response, the FIM decided that the Isle of Man TT would be withdrawn from the World Championship calendar after the 1976 races. Agostini maintained that he did not object to the event itself, but that he only opposed riders being contractually required to enter such a dangerous race as part of a World Championship campaign.

=== Saarinen's arrival and the two-stroke threat ===
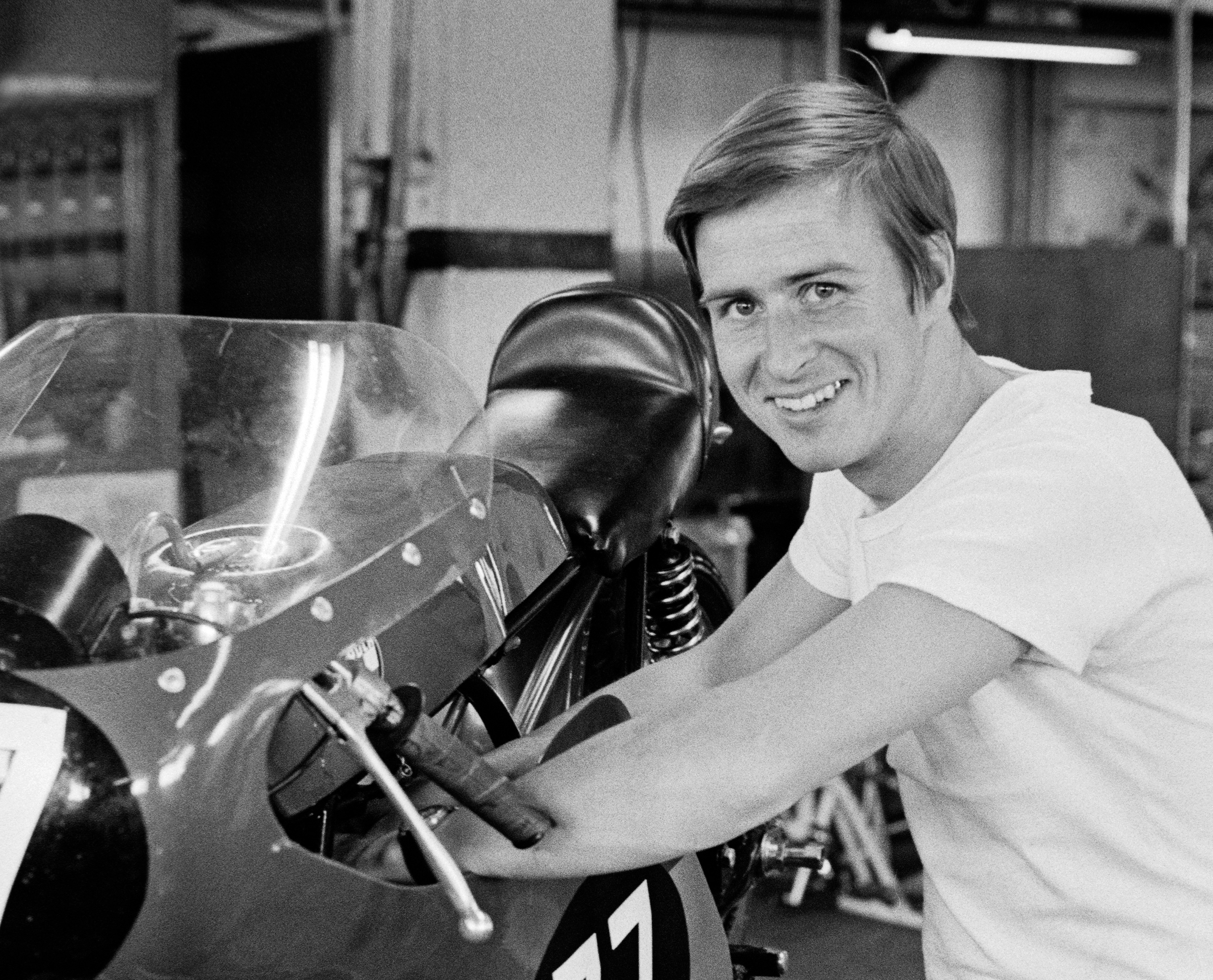
Jarno Saarinen in 1970.

By 1972, MV Agusta was the last major manufacturer to compete in the FIM World Championships using four-stroke motorcycles, as advancements in two-stroke engine technology by Japanese manufacturers were becoming evident. Agostini successfully defended his 500cc title with a record 11 victories in the 13-round series. His record would stand until 1997 when Mick Doohan won twelve races. However, in the 350 class, Yamaha and their top rider Jarno Saarinen began to challenge Agostini and the dominant MV Agusta team for the first time in years. Saarinen won three races in the 1972 350cc World Championship, including a victory at the West German Grand Prix where he gave Agostini his first defeat in a head-to-head race since the 1967 Canadian Grand Prix. Although Agostini was able to claim his fifth consecutive 350cc World Championship in 1972, the increasing threat from Yamaha's performance was so strong that the MV Agusta factory was forced to produce a new 350cc motorcycle for Agostini and to hire Phil Read as his teammate.

At the 1972 Hutchinson 100 held at the tight and technical Brands Hatch circuit on 6 August, Peter Williams used the lightweight and agility of his renowned Tom Arter-tuned single-cylinder Matchless G50 to catch and pass Agostini who then crashed while in pursuit of Williams.

In 1973, Yamaha developed a new four-cylinder, two-stroke Yamaha YZR500 motorcycle for Saarinen, and he began the 500cc World Championship with victories in France and Austria while Agostini had to withdraw with mechanical issues. Saarinen was leading the World Championship when an accident at the 1973 Nations Grand Prix claimed the life of Saarinen as well as top contender, Renzo Pasolini. The loss of Saarinen caused Yamaha to withdraw their team from the World Championship out of respect for their fallen rider.

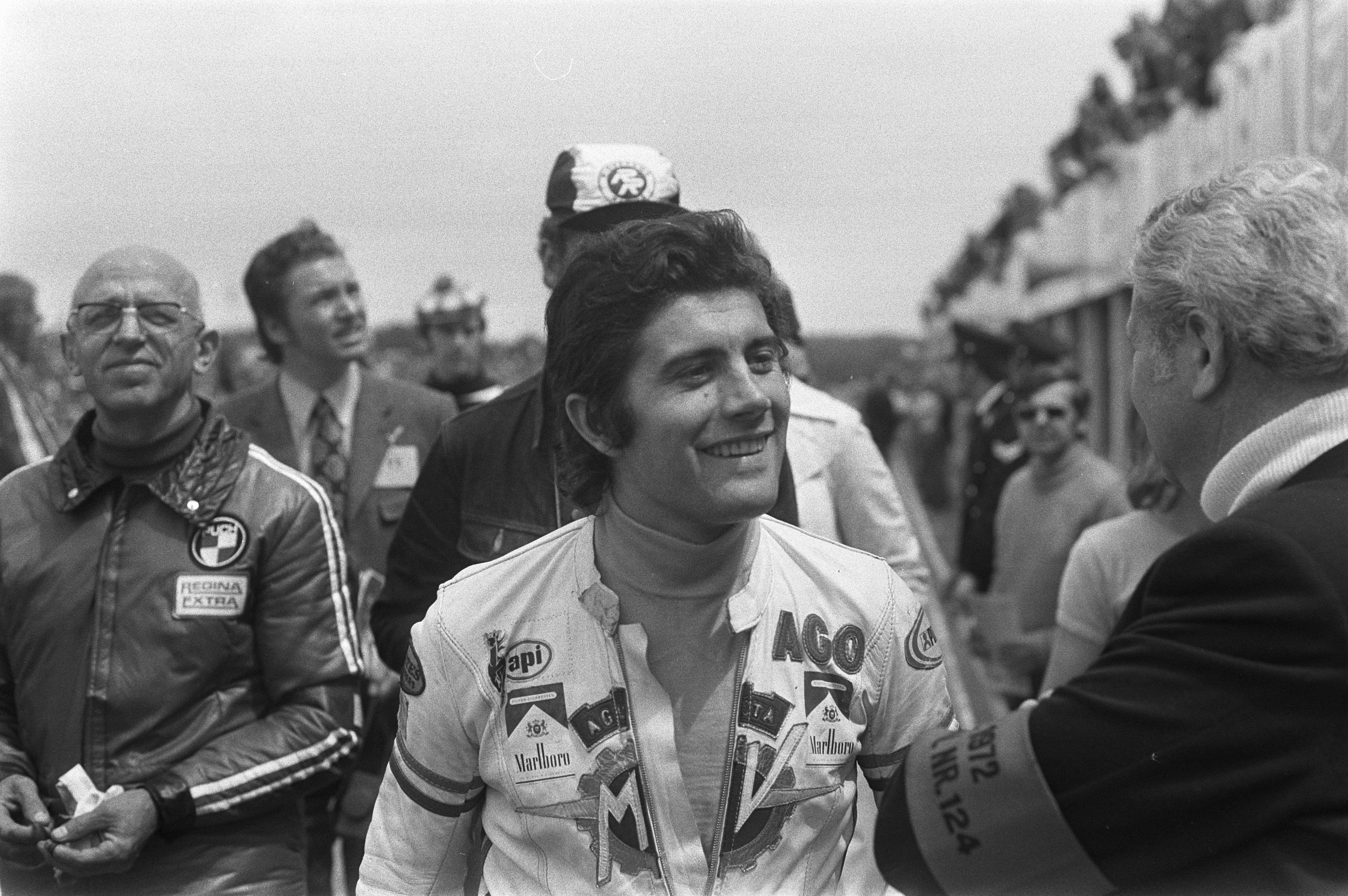
Agostini at the 1972 Dutch TT.

Agostini's mechanical issues along with the cancellation of the 500cc Nations Grand Prix after Saarinen's death and the subsequent boycott of the Yugoslavian Grand Prix over unsafe conditions, meant that he did not score any points in the first seven races of the year. Meanwhile, his new teammate Read proved to be less than willing to play a subordinate role to Agostini by scoring points at every opportunity, including a victory in Sweden where he relegated Agostini to second place. In the final five races of the season, Agostini took three victories, but he was unable to overcome his early-season points deficit which allowed his teammate Read to win his first World Championship in the premier 500cc division. In the 350cc class, he successfully fended off a challenge from Yamaha's Teuvo Länsivuori to win his sixth consecutive 350cc World Championship.

=== Move to Yamaha and later career ===
Agostini was frustrated with Read's role in team politics and came to believe that Read was receiving preferential treatment. He was also frustrated by MV Agusta's lack of development since the death of Count Agusta, and the growing threat of Japanese two-stroke technology. After negotiations with Yamaha's European racing manager and former World Champion Rod Gould, Agostini signed a six-figure contract to join the Yamaha factory racing team for the 1974 season. His decision to leave the MV Agusta team after 10 years and 13 World Championships to prove that he could win on a two-stroke as well as a four-stroke motorcycle shocked the motorcycle racing community; Italian motorsports journalists treated his departure from MV Agusta as a treasonous act.

After American racer Cal Rayborn had dominated the 1972 Transatlantic Trophy match races against British riders, motorsports journalists speculated whether the American might be able to challenge Agostini. It was not to be: Rayborn was killed in December 1973 while competing in a race in New Zealand just months before the two competitors would have met for the first time at the Daytona 200 in March 1974.

Agostini made his highly publicized debut with the Yamaha team at Daytona when he rode the newly introduced Yamaha TZ750 to victory over a field of riders that included; Kenny Roberts, Gary Nixon and Yvon Duhamel. His victory at the Daytona 200 helped to cement the event's reputation as one of the most prestigious motorcycle races in the world. One month later he defeated Roberts to win the Imola 200 race in Italy.

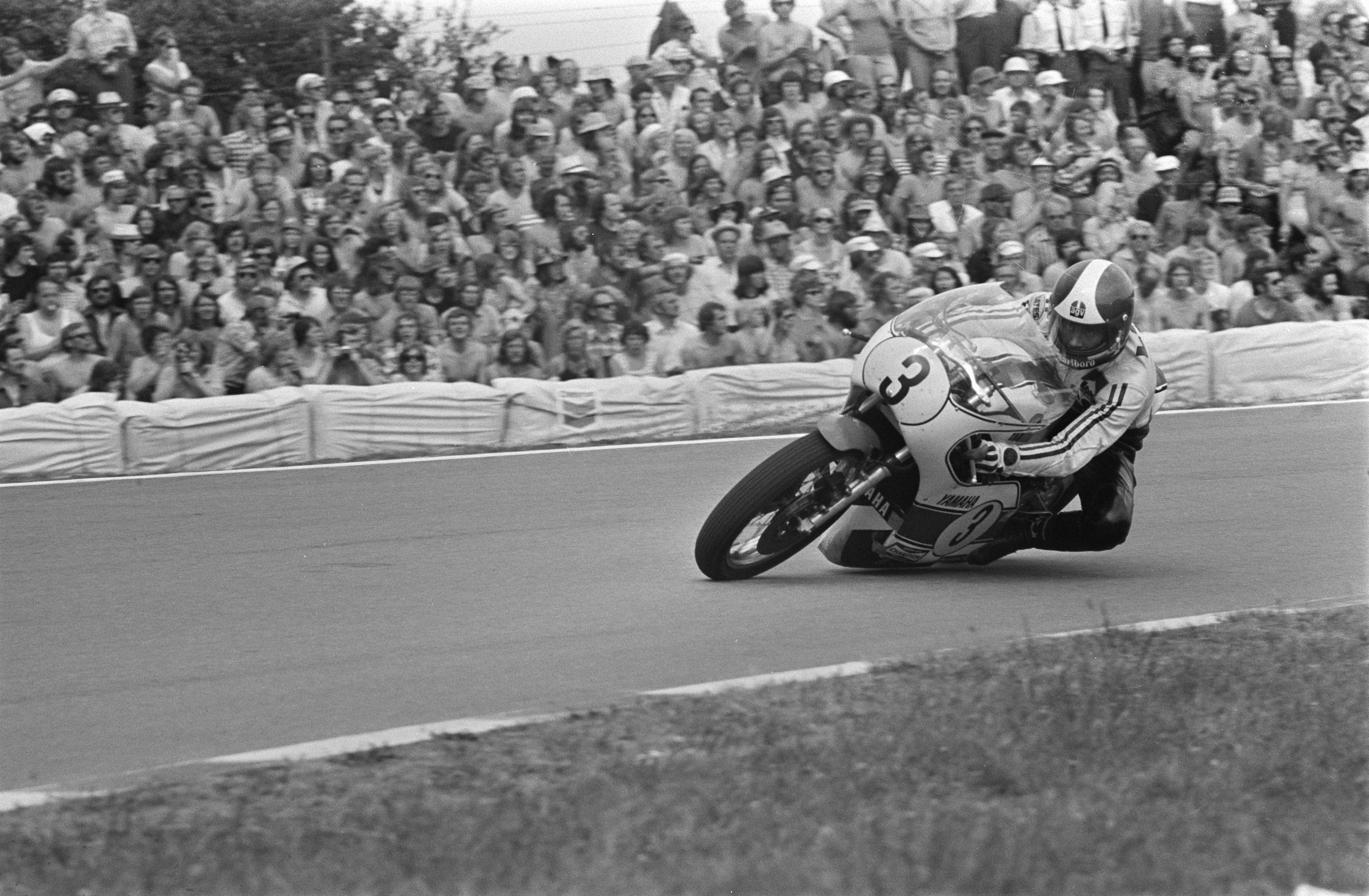
Agostini (3) riding a Yamaha YZR500 to victory in the 1974 Dutch TT.

Agostini's first season with Yamaha in 1974 was marred by crashes and mechanical failures. He led the opening round in France only to retire with a gearbox failure and then ran out of fuel while leading the Nations Grand Prix with two laps remaining. Despite only finishing four races all year, two of those finishes were victories in Austria and the Netherlands. A broken shoulder caused after colliding with Barry Sheene at the Swedish Grand Prix ended his attempt to regain the 500cc title. The accident marked one of the few times during his career that he suffered a serious injury.

Agostini was more successful in the 350cc class where the Yamaha TZ 350 dominated so thoroughly that the MV Agusta team withdrew their 350cc motorcycle from the competition. Agostini won five of the ten rounds to easily claim the seventh consecutive 350cc world championship of his career, including his victory at the Austrian Grand Prix after race leader Chas Mortimer allowed Agostini to pass him for the win. Mortimer also rode a Yamaha and was concerned that the Yamaha factory might deny him support if he defeated their top rider. His 350 World Championship on the Yamaha marked the first time that a two-stroke powered motorcycle had won the 350 title.

At the conclusion of the world championship season, he returned to the United States to appear in the 1974 Champion Spark Plug Classic held at the Ontario Motor Speedway where he would once again compete against American champion Kenny Roberts. He finished behind Barry Sheene and Steve McLaughlin in his qualifying heat race, but he then crashed after colliding with McLaughlin in the first corner of the first leg (the race was held in two legs). Although his motorcycle was only lightly damaged, Agostini sat out the second leg to the disappointment of spectators who had been anticipating his confrontation with Roberts.

Agostini rebounded in 1975 and began the season by winning three of the first four races to take the championship points lead. The championship was not decided until the final race of the year as he continued to face strong opposition from Read and the MV Agusta team. His title bid was also threatened by the increasing performance of the new Suzuki RG 500 ridden by Barry Sheene. At the 1975 Swedish Grand Prix, Sheene claimed a dramatic victory with a last corner pass around the outside of Agostini. He then suffered two consecutive retirements in Belgium and Sweden, which allowed Read to close the points gap. Agostini won the penultimate round in Finland, but Read still had a mathematical chance to win the title. Going into the final round in Czechoslovakia, Read needed to win the race with Agostini placing no higher than eighth in order to win the championship. Read won the final race and Agostini finished in second place to clinch his fifteenth and final World Championship.

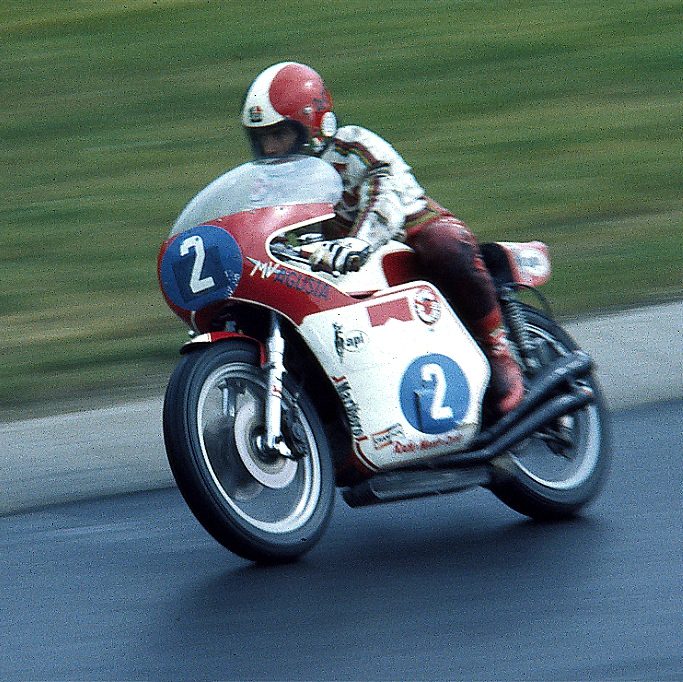
Agostini on the 350cc MV Agusta during practice for the 1976 German Grand Prix at the Nürburgring.

Agostini's victory on the Yamaha marked the first time that a two-stroke motorcycle had won the premier 500cc class, as well as the first world title won on a motorcycle equipped with racing slick tires. His string of seven consecutive 350cc World Championships came to an end in 1975 when he finished second to teenage prodigy Johnny Cecotto who competed on Agostini's 1974 Yamaha TZ 350.

In the wake of the 1973 oil crisis, sales of recreational vehicles decreased significantly forcing Yamaha to reduce their competition budget by withdrawing their road racing and motocross teams after the 1975 season. Agostini then formed his own team with the financial backing of the Marlboro cigarette company. After the MV Agusta team withdrew from the World Championships following the 1975 season, Agostini was offered the use of the 1975 factory racing motorcycles.

Agostini began the 1976 season riding the MV Agustas, but when it became apparent that Suzuki's RG-500 had become the class of the field, he purchased one for himself. He experienced numerous mechanical problems with the Suzuki and failed to score any points until the last race of the year in West Germany where he reverted to the MV Agusta.

The 500cc West German Grand Prix at the Nurburgring circuit was held in rainy conditions so Agostini chose the MV Agusta to take advantage of the smoother power delivery of its four-stroke engine. He dominated the race to take the victory by over one minute ahead of Lucchinelli and Hennen. The victory marked final Grand Prix win for himself and the marque, as well as the last by a four-stroke engine in the 500cc class. He raced only once in the 350 class to win the Dutch TT on an MV Agusta, marking the final 350 class victory by a four-stroke motorcycle. Sheene won the 500 title for the Suzuki team while Agostini dropped to seventh in the championship.

Agostini rode Yamaha motorcycles in 1977 but failed to win a Grand Prix for the first time since 1964. He was still competitive with two second place finishes in the 500 championship and another second place in the 350 championship. He ended the 1977 season ranked 16th in the 350 class and 6th in the 500 class. Agostini won the final race of his career on September 25, 1977 at the final round of the 1977 Formula 750 Championship held at the Hockenheimring. Agostini then announced his retirement from motorcycle competition at the age of 35.

=== Racing car career ===
Like Jean-Pierre Beltoise, John Surtees and Mike Hailwood before him, Agostini raced in Formula One cars. He competed in non-championship Formula One races in 1978. He competed in the European Formula 2 series in a Chevron B42-BMW and British Aurora Formula 1 with his own team and a Williams FW06. He ended his auto racing career in 1980.

=== Team manager ===
In 1982, Agostini returned to motorcycle racing as the Marlboro Yamaha team manager. In this role, he won three 500cc titles with Eddie Lawson and managed many successful riders including Graeme Crosby and Kenny Roberts. Under his management riders won the 1982 Daytona Formula 1 (Crosby), 1983 and 1984 Daytona Formula 1 (Roberts) and 1986 Daytona Superbike championships (Lawson). Between 1986 and 1990, he also managed the Marlboro Yamaha 250cc team with riders like Luca Cadalora, Martin Wimmer and Àlex Crivillé.

Since 1992, Agostini served as the Cagiva factory racing team manager until 1994, when Cagiva withdrew from the world championship. Agostini's last season as team manager was 1995 when he managed a 250cc Honda team with Doriano Romboni as rider.

== Motorcycle racing career overview ==
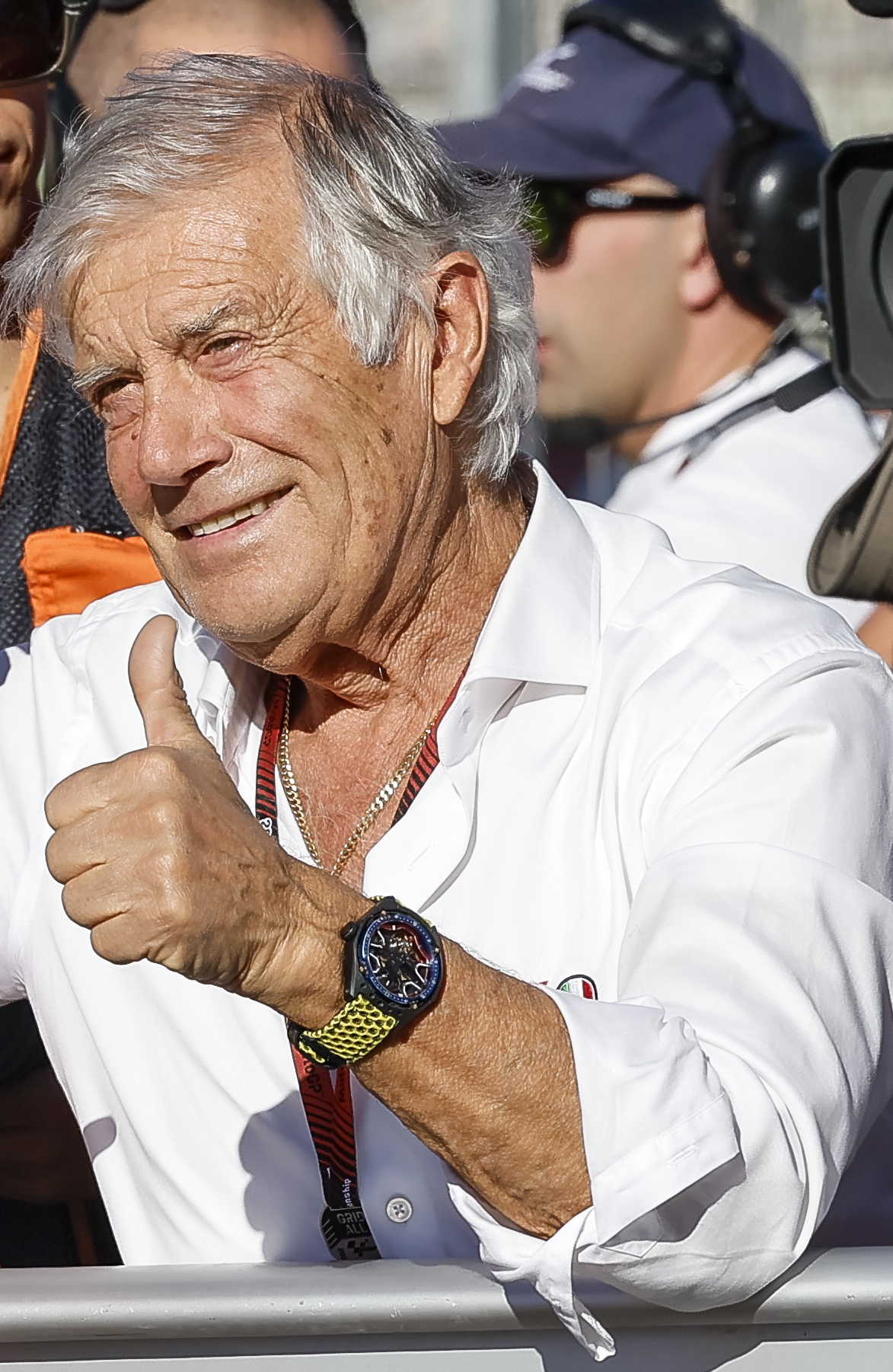
Agostini in 2022

In 14 seasons, Agostini started 223 races, finishing on the podium 159 times with 122 victories. His 15 World Championships and 122 Grand Prix victories are the most in the history of Grand Prix motorcycle racing. He won seven consecutive 500cc world championships with MV Agusta between 1966 and 1972, plus seven consecutive 350cc world championships between 1968 and 1974. He set 117 fastest laps, but only has six official pole positions to his name as they were only recorded from 1974.

Agostini was also a ten-time winner of the Isle of Man TT which was the most prestigious race of the year during his era. He won the Senior TT 5 consecutive times from 1968 to 1972 and the Junior TT 5 out of 6 years from 1967 to 1972. In addition to Agostini's successes at the TT he also won seven Ulster Grand Prix races. Along with Graeme Crosby, Agostini shares the distinction of being the only competitors who have won the Isle of Man Senior TT, the Daytona 200 and the Imola 200.

A hump in the road on the TT circuit at the start of Quarterbridge Road was named “Ago’s Leap” after Agostini, in reference to a famous photograph taken by motorsport photographer, the late B.R. 'Nick' Nicholls that captured the moment that Agostini rode over the hump and lofted the front wheel of his motorcycle into the air.

== Racing results ==
=== Complete Grand Prix motorcycle racing results ===
Points system from 1964 to 1968:

| Position | 1 | 2 | 3 | 4 | 5 | 6 |
| Points | 8 | 6 | 4 | 3 | 2 | 1 |

Points system from 1969 onwards:

| Position | 1 | 2 | 3 | 4 | 5 | 6 | 7 | 8 | 9 | 10 |
| Points | 15 | 12 | 10 | 8 | 6 | 5 | 4 | 3 | 2 | 1 |

| Year | Class | Bike | 1 | 2 | 3 | 4 | 5 | 6 | 7 | 8 | 9 | 10 | 11 | 12 | 13 | Pts | Pos |
|---|---|---|---|---|---|---|---|---|---|---|---|---|---|---|---|---|---|
| 1963 | 250cc | Moto Morini | ESP | GER | | IOM | NED | BEL | ULS | DDR | | NAT; Ret | ARG | JPN | | 0 | NC |
| 1964 | 250cc | Moto Morini | USA | ESP | FRA | IOM | NED | BEL | GER; 4 | DDR | ULS | | NAT; 4 | JPN | | 6 | 12th |
| 1965 | 350cc | MV Agusta | | GER; 1 | IOM; 3 | NED; 3 | | DDR; Ret | CZE; Ret | ULS | FIN; 1 | NAT; 1 | JPN; 5 | | | 32 | 2nd |
| 1965 | 500cc | MV Agusta | USA | GER; 2 | IOM; Ret | NED; 2 | BEL; 2 | DDR; 2 | CZE; 2 | ULS | FIN; 1 | NAT; 2 | | | | 32 | 2nd |
| 1966 | 350cc | MV Agusta | GER; Ret | FRA; 2 | NED; 2 | | DDR; 1 | CZE; 2 | FIN; Ret | ULS; 2 | IOM; 1 | NAT; 1 | JPN | | | 42 | 2nd |
| 1966 | 500cc | MV Agusta | GER; 2 | | NED; 2 | BEL; 1 | DDR; Ret | CZE; 2 | FIN; 1 | ULS; 2 | IOM; 2 | NAT; 1 | | | | 36 | 1st |
| 1967 | 350cc | MV Agusta | GER; 2 | IOM; 2 | NED; 2 | | DDR; 2 | CZE; 7 | | ULS; 1 | NAT; Ret | | JPN | | | 32 | 2nd |
| 1967 | 500cc | MV Agusta | GER; 1 | IOM; Ret | NED; 2 | BEL; 1 | DDR; 1 | CZE; 2 | FIN; 1 | ULS; 20 | NAT; 1 | CAN; 2 | | | | 46 | 1st |
| 1968 | 350cc | MV Agusta | GER; 1 | | IOM; 1 | NED; 1 | | DDR; 1 | CZE; 1 | | ULS; 1 | NAT; 1 | | | | 32 | 1st |
| 1968 | 500cc | MV Agusta | GER; 1 | ESP; 1 | IOM; 1 | NED; 1 | BEL; 1 | DDR; 1 | CZE; 1 | FIN; 1 | ULS; 1 | NAT; 1 | | | | 48 | 1st |
| 1969 | 350cc | MV Agusta | ESP; 1 | GER; 1 | | IOM; 1 | NED; 1 | | DDR; 1 | CZE; 1 | FIN; 1 | ULS; 1 | NAT | YUG | | 90 | 1st |
| 1969 | 500cc | MV Agusta | ESP; 1 | GER; 1 | FRA; 1 | IOM; 1 | NED; 1 | BEL; 1 | DDR; 1 | CZE; 1 | FIN; 1 | ULS; 1 | NAT | YUG | | 105 | 1st |
| 1970 | 350cc | MV Agusta | GER; 1 | | YUG; 1 | IOM; 1 | NED; 1 | | DDR; 1 | CZE; 1 | FIN; 1 | ULS; 1 | NAT; 1 | ESP | | 105 | 1st |
| 1970 | 500cc | MV Agusta | GER; 1 | FRA; 1 | YUG; 1 | IOM; 1 | NED; 1 | BEL; 1 | DDR; 1 | | FIN; 1 | ULS; 1 | NAT; 1 | ESP | | 90 | 1st |
| 1971 | 350cc | MV Agusta | AUT; 1 | GER; 1 | IOM; Ret | NED; 1 | | DDR; 1 | CZE; Ret | SWE; 1 | FIN; 1 | ULS | NAT; Ret | ESP | | 90 | 1st |
| 1971 | 500cc | MV Agusta | AUT; 1 | GER; 1 | IOM; 1 | NED; 1 | BEL; 1 | DDR; 1 | | SWE; 1 | FIN; 1 | ULS | NAT; Ret | ESP | | 90 | 1st |
| 1972 | 350cc | MV Agusta | GER; 2 | FRA; 4 | AUT; 1 | NAT; 1 | IOM; 1 | YUG; Ret | NED; 1 | | DDR; Ret | CZE; Ret | SWE; 1 | FIN; 1 | ESP | 102 | 1st |
| 1972 | 500cc | MV Agusta | GER; 1 | FRA; 1 | AUT; 1 | NAT; 1 | IOM; 1 | YUG; Ret | NED; 1 | BEL; 1 | DDR; 1 | CZE; 1 | SWE; 1 | FIN; 1 | ESP | 105 | 1st |
| 1973 | 350cc | MV Agusta | FRA; 1 | AUT; Ret | GER; Ret | NAT; 1 | IOM | YUG | NED; 1 | | CZE; 2 | SWE; 2 | FIN; 1 | ESP | | 84 | 1st |
| 1973 | 500cc | MV Agusta | FRA; Ret | AUT; Ret | GER; Ret | NAT; C | IOM | YUG | NED; Ret | BEL; 1 | CZE; 1 | SWE; 2 | FIN; 1 | ESP | | 57 | 3rd |
| 1974 | 350cc | Yamaha | FRA; 1 | GER | AUT; 1 | NAT; 1 | IOM | NED; 1 | | SWE; DNS | FIN | | YUG; 1 | ESP | | 75 | 1st |
| 1974 | 500cc | Yamaha | FRA; Ret | GER | AUT; 1 | NAT; Ret | IOM | NED; 1 | BEL; 2 | SWE; Ret | FIN | CZE; 6 | | | | 47 | 4th |
| 1975 | 350cc | Yamaha | FRA; 2 | ESP; 1 | AUT; Ret | GER; Ret | NAT; 2 | IOM | NED; 4 | | | FIN; 2 | CZE; Ret | YUG | | 59 | 2nd |
| 1975 | 500cc | Yamaha | FRA; 1 | | AUT; Ret | GER; 1 | NAT; 1 | IOM | NED; 2 | BEL; Ret | SWE; Ret | FIN; 1 | CZE; 2 | | | 84 | 1st |
| 1976 | 350cc | MV Agusta | FRA; Ret | AUT; Ret | NAT; Ret | YUG; Ret | IOM | NED; 1 | | | FIN; Ret | CZE; Ret | GER; Ret | ESP | | 15 | 15th |
| 1976 | 500cc | MV Agusta | FRA; 5 | AUT; 6 | | | | | | | | | GER; 1 | | | 26 | 7th |
| 1976 | 500cc | Suzuki | | | NAT; Ret | | IOM | NED; Ret | BEL; Ret | SWE | FIN; Ret | CZE; Ret | | | | 26 | 7th |
| 1977 | 350cc | Yamaha | VEN | | GER; 2 | NAT; 8 | ESP - | FRA; 11 | YUG - | NED - | | SWE; 13 | FIN - | CZE; 10 | GBR - | 16 | 16th |
| 1977 | 500cc | Yamaha | VEN | AUT; DNS | GER; Ret | NAT; 5 | | FRA; 2 | | NED; Ret | BEL; 8 | SWE; 9 | FIN; Ret | CZE; 2 | GBR; 9 | 37 | 6th |

=== Complete Formula 750 Championship results ===
| Year | Class | Bike | 1 | 2 | 3 | 4 | 5 | 6 | 7 | 8 | 9 | 10 | 11 | 12 | 13 | 14 | 15 | 16 | 17 | 18 | 19 | Pts | Pos |
|---|---|---|---|---|---|---|---|---|---|---|---|---|---|---|---|---|---|---|---|---|---|---|---|
| 1975 | 750cc | Yamaha | USA; 4 | ITA 1 | ITA 2 | BEL 1 | BEL 2 | FRA 1 | FRA 2 | SWE 1 | SWE 2 | FIN 1 | FIN 2 | SIL 1 | SIL 2 | NED 1 | NED 2 | GER 1 | GER 2 | | | 8 | 21st |
| 1976 | 750cc | Yamaha | USA | VEN 1 | VEN 2 | ITA 1 | ITA 2 | ESP 1 | ESP 2 | BEL 1 | BEL 2 | FRA 1 | FRA 2; 3 | SIL 1 | SIL 2 | NED 1 | NED 2; 1 | GER 1 | GER 2 | | | 12 | 18th |
| 1977 | 750cc | Yamaha | USA | ITA 1 | ITA 2; 3 | ESP | FRA 1 | FRA 2 | GBR 1 | GBR 2 | AUT; 2 | BEL 1 | BEL 2 | NED 1; 4 | NED 2; 4 | USA 1 | USA 2 | CAN 1 | CAN 2 | GER 1; 1 | GER 2; 1 | 45 | 3rd |

=== Complete British Formula One Championship results ===
(key)

| Year | Entrant | Chassis | Engine | 1 | 2 | 3 | 4 | 5 | 6 | 7 | 8 | 9 | 10 | 11 | 12 | 13 | 14 | 15 | Pos | Pts. |
|---|---|---|---|---|---|---|---|---|---|---|---|---|---|---|---|---|---|---|---|---|
| 1979 | Giacomo Agostini | Williams FW06 | Cosworth | ZOL; 9 | OUL; 6 | BRH; 5 | MAL; Ret | SNE; 2 | THR; 6 | ZAN; 3 | DON; 9 | OUL; 3 | NOG; Ret | MAL; Ret | BRH; Ret | THR; 6 | SNE; 7 | SIL; 7 | 8th | 19 |
| 1980 | Giacomo Agostini | Williams FW06 | Cosworth | OUL | BRH; 4 | SIL; Ret | MAL | THR; 4 | MNZ; 3 | MAL | SNE; Ret | BRH; 3 | THR; 3 | OUL | SIL; 3 | | | | 5th | 22 |

== See also ==
- Legends of Italian sport - Walk of Fame
- List of Grand Prix motorcycle racing rider records
- List of Grand Prix motorcycle racing winners

== Bibliography ==
- Agostini, Giacomo; Donnini, Mario (25 September 2013). Giacomo Agostini: Immagini di una vita / A Life in Pictures. Giorgio Nada Editore. ISBN 978-8879115841.

| Preceded by Mike Hailwood | 500cc Motorcycle World Champion; 1966–1972 | Succeeded by Phil Read |
| Preceded by Phil Read | 500cc Motorcycle World Champion; 1975 | Succeeded by Barry Sheene |
| Preceded by Mike Hailwood | 350cc Motorcycle World Champion; 1968–1974 | Succeeded by Johnny Cecotto |
