= Suzuki RG 500 =

Suzuki RG500
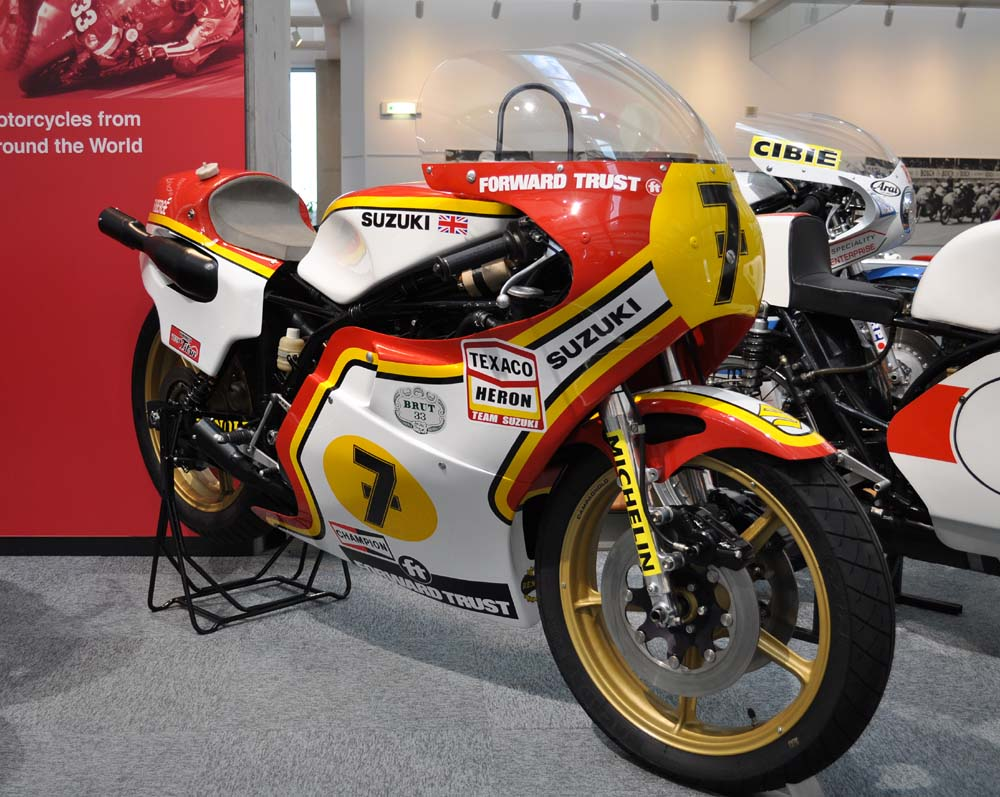
- Suzuki RG500 Mark II (1977)
- Manufacturer: Suzuki
- Also called: Suzuki RGB500
- Production: 1974–1980
- Predecessor: Suzuki TR500
- Successor: Suzuki RG500 gamma
- Engine: 495 cc two-stroke 4 cylinder U engine (1976-1980); 497.5 cc two-stroke 4 cylinder U engine (1974-1975)
- Bore / stroke: 56 mm × 50.5 mm (2.20 in × 1.99 in) (1974-1975); 54 mm × 54 mm (2.13 in × 2.13 in) (1976-1980)
- Power: 90 hp (67 kW; 91 PS) @ 11,000 rpm (1974 XR14)

The Suzuki RG 500 road racing motorcycle was produced by Japanese manufacturer Suzuki to compete in the 500cc class of Grand Prix motorcycle racing from 1974 to 1980. The motorcycle won seven manufacturers' titles in succession and became the motorcycle of choice for privateer racers in the late 1970s.

The motorcycle was designed by Makoto Hase using the proven square-four, two stroke engine architecture that Suzuki had developed during their successful Grand Prix racing program in the 1960s. It replaced the previous Suzuki 500 Grand Prix race bike based on the road-going Suzuki TR500 production model that was developed by Suzuki's European importer and campaigned by Jack Findlay in the early 1970s.

The RG 500 was proven successful in its first race at the 1974 500cc French Grand Prix when Barry Sheene finished in second place behind the defending world champion, Phil Read, on the previously dominant MV Agusta. Sheene rode the motorcycle to its first Grand Prix race win at the 1975 500cc Dutch TT. Sheene rode an RG 500 to win the 1976 and 1977 500cc world championships.

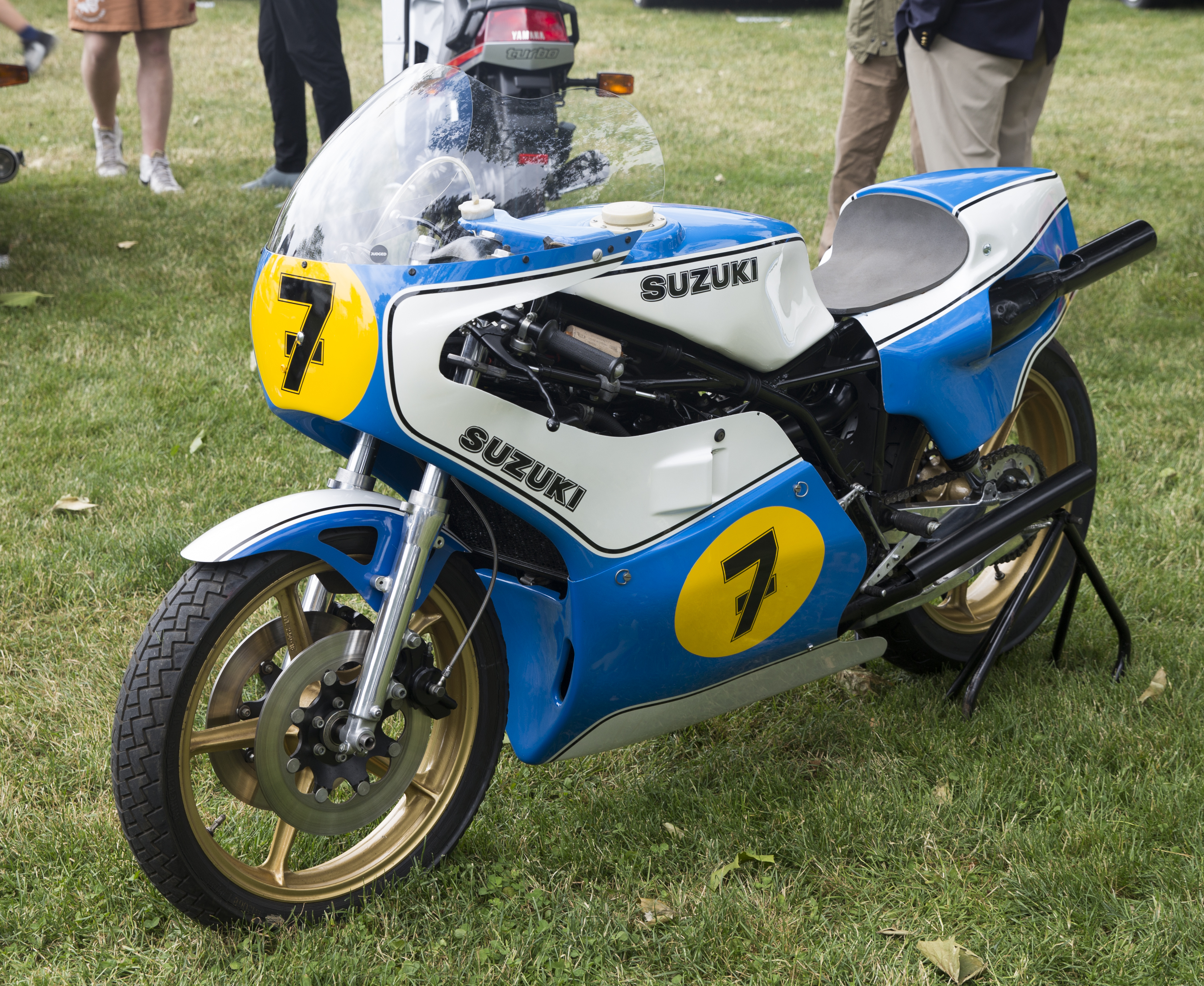
1980 Suzuki RG 500 (Mark V)

The RG 500 was made available to the public in 1976 and allowed privateer racers to be competitive in the 500cc world championship. Suzuki dominated the 1976 500cc world championship with RG 500s taking 11 of the first 12 places in the premier class.

== See also ==
- Honda NR500
- Kawasaki H1R
- Honda RC181
- Honda RC174
- Yamaha YZR500
- MV Agusta 500 Four
