= Kawasaki H2R =

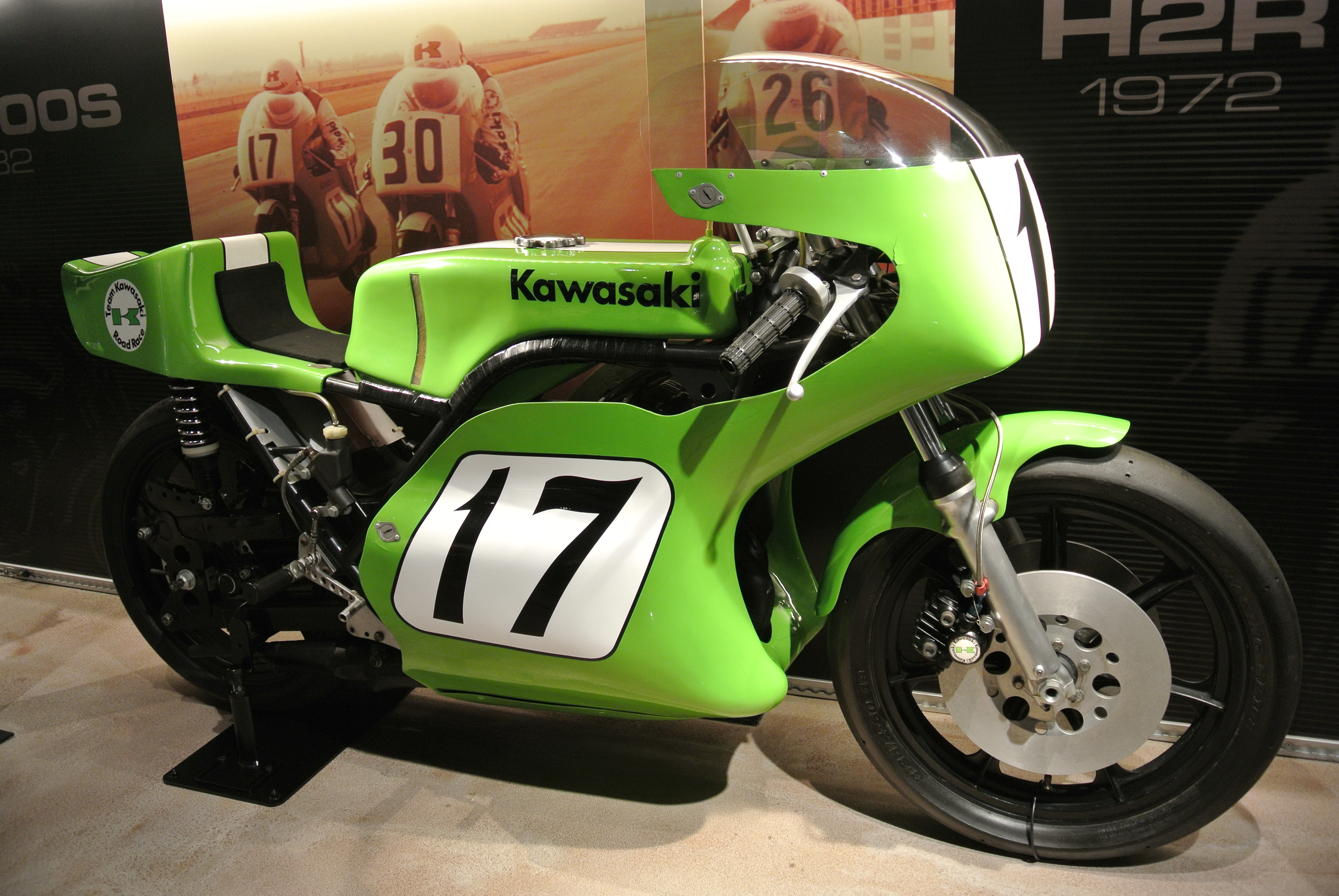
- 1972 Kawasaki H2R
- Manufacturer: Kawasaki
- Production: 1972-1974
- Assembly: Max 6
- Successor: Kawasaki KR750
- Class: Racing (Formula 750)
- Engine: 748 cc inline, air cooled, two stroke triple
- Bore / stroke: 71.0 mm × 63.0 mm
- Compression ratio: Lower level case
- Power: max 6 thousandand 7
- Transmission: 11
- Frame type: Double tubular steel cradle
- Related: Kawasaki H2 Mach IV

The Kawasaki H2R was a racing motorcycle built by Kawasaki from 1972 to 1974. It was based on the road going Kawasaki H2 Mach IV air cooled, two stroke triple. In 1975 it was replaced by a water cooled development, the Kawasaki KR750.

== Timeline ==
=== 1971 ===
The AMA had announced that the regulations for 1972 had been changed to allow 750 cc two strokes to compete in 750cc class, leading Kawasaki to develop a race version of the road-going H2.

The engine was powerful but fragile.

The chassis of the H2R was derived from the chassis used on the H1R which had been derived from the Kawasaki 250 racers and was effectively an enlargement of the 1968 125 cc frame. This frame had been based on the Norton Featherbed. To overcome the vibration of the larger engines, the engine was rubber-mounted which affected the stiffness of the frame as the engine was no longer contributing to its rigidity.

The H2 was thirsty, initially only giving 10 mpg, and would therefore need to stop to refuel in the longer races such as the Daytona 200. Kawasaki management felt the extra power the engine produced would negate the disadvantage of a pitstop.

In an attempt to gain pre-launch publicity, a "secret" H2R test was run at an American circuit.

=== 1972 ===
During practice for the bikes first outing, the 1972 Daytona 200, it was found the chains and tyres had trouble handling the claimed 100 bhp of the machine. Yvon Duhamel, Gary Nixon and Paul Smart all retired from the race with chain and tyre problems.

The H2R was developed and improved through the season. The US Kawasaki team, Team Hanson, started work on their own frame. Although former Triumph development rider Paul Smart joined the team for 1972, his experience and advice was ignored. The team preferring to listen to feedback from their number one rider Yvon Duhamel.

Duhamel won at Road Atlanta and again at Talladega Superspeedway, where Nixon came second. Paul Smart won at the big-money season finale at the Ontario Motor Speedway. Smart had commissioned Colin Seeley to build a new frame for his bike for the Ontario race. This caused a disagreement with the team and his contract wasn't renewed for the following year.

=== 1973 ===
For 1973 the AMA changed the regulations to match the newly introduced In 1973 FIM Formula 750. The FIM regulations required the road bike cylinders to be used. Kawasaki had cast new outer cylinders for the H2R with exhaust ports pointing inwards towards the centreline to allow the fairing to be narrowed. On the road bike the ports pointed outwards. To overcome this Kawasaki swapped the outer cylinders to the opposite sides. The outer cooling fins had to be machined down to allow this which made cooling of the engine marginal leading to a number of failures over the season.

Kawasaki took control of the team for 1973 and considerably increased the budget. The team for this year consisted of 5 permanent members, Yvon Duhamel, Art Baumann, Hurley Wilvert, Gary Nixon and Cliff Carr, plus an occasional guest rider. Privateers also raced the H2.

The machine had been improved over the winter and was the fastest bike at Daytona's season opener. In the race Duhamel and Baumann fought for the lead until they crashed out, Nixon and Japanese rider Masahiro Wada's bikes both seized leaving Kawasaki out of the results.

The H2R won five of the nine AMA road races. Nixon won the Loudon Classic. At Laguna Seca, Kawasaki dominated the heats (1st, 2nd, 3rd in heat 1, 1st, 2nd, 5th in Heat 2), and ran 1, 2, 3, 4 in the race until Duhamel crashed and Baumann retired with an ignition failure. Nixon won the race and again at Mount Pocono. Duhamel won at Charlotte and at Ontario season finale, Duhamel, Nixon and Baumann took the first three places. Nixon finished the season third in the AMA Grand National Standings.

Duhamel, Nixon and Baumann were members of the American team in the 1973 Transatlantic Trophy and Duhamel scored a win, two seconds and a third in the six races on the Kawasaki.

Riding H2Rs in the inaugural international 1973 FIM Formula 750 Prize, Baumann crashed whilst running second in the Imola 200 and Duhamel's bike caught fire during a pitstop for refuelling. Future world champion Walter Villa finished third in the race. At the John Player International at Silverstone, Pat Mahoney finished 6th and Éric Offenstadt 9th.

=== 1974 ===
Following the 1973 oil crisis, Kawasaki cut back its racing budget for 1974. Riders were cut back to Duhamel and Baumann as full works riders and Wilvert being supplied with a bike but not getting a salary or support from Kawasaki mechanics. Team manager Bob Hansen left and the team mechanics cut from four to one. Duhamel and Baumann used 1974 machines but Wilvert continued 1973 machine.

Baumann crashed in practice for the 1974 season opener at Daytona, suffering concussion which put him out for the rest of the weekend. Duhamel's bike locked up in the second heat throwing him off, leaving Wilvert on the only Kawasaki to start the race. As the "B team" rider, Wilvert tested new parts for the team. At Daytona Wilvert's bike was fitted with a new frame which handled better than the existing frame and he finished third in the race.

Duhamel and Baumann were again members of the American team for the 1974 Transatlantic Trophy, this time with Duhamel as captain. Duhamel won one of the races.

At the 1974 John Player International Grand Prix at Silverstone, Duhamel finished second and Tony Rutter sixth on the H2R.

Although the H2 was improved for 1974, and was faster than the 1973 model, it was no match for the newly introduced Yamaha TZ750.
