= Yamaha YZR500 =

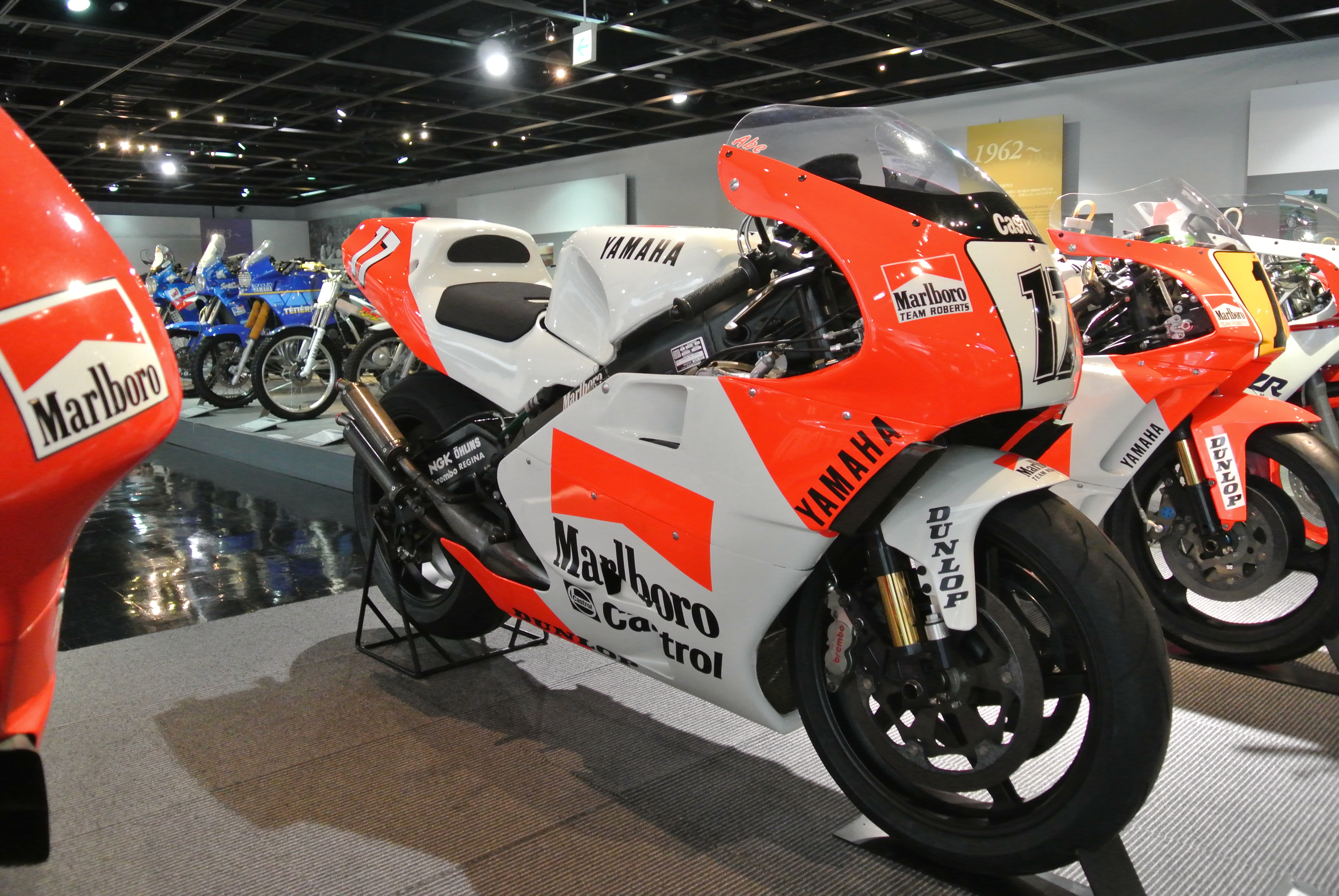
- 1995 Yamaha YZR500
- Manufacturer: Yamaha Motor Company
- Production: 1973–2002
- Predecessor: Yamaha YZ634A
- Successor: Yamaha YZR-M1
- Engine: two-stroke OW23: 494.7 cc (30.19 cu in) inline-4 OW60: 498.5 cc (30.42 cu in) U engine OW61: 498.5 cc (30.42 cu in) 60° V4; OWK1: 494.7 cc (30.19 cu in) 70° V4
- Bore / stroke: 54 mm × 54 mm (2.1 in × 2.1 in); 56 mm × 50.6 mm (2.20 in × 1.99 in)
- Power: 0WL9: 142 kW (190 hp) @ 10,500 rpm
- Related: Yamaha YZR250, Yamaha TZ750

The Yamaha YZR500 was a 500 cc Grand Prix racing motorcycle made by Yamaha from 1973 to 2002. It achieved significant acclaim, especially during the 1980s and 1990s.

== Racing history ==
The YZR500 was ridden by championship winners Giacomo Agostini (1975), Kenny Roberts (1978, 1979, 1980), Eddie Lawson (1984, 1986, 1988) and Wayne Rainey (1990, 1991, 1992).

Phillip McCallen won the Macau Grand Prix in 1996.

== Chronology ==
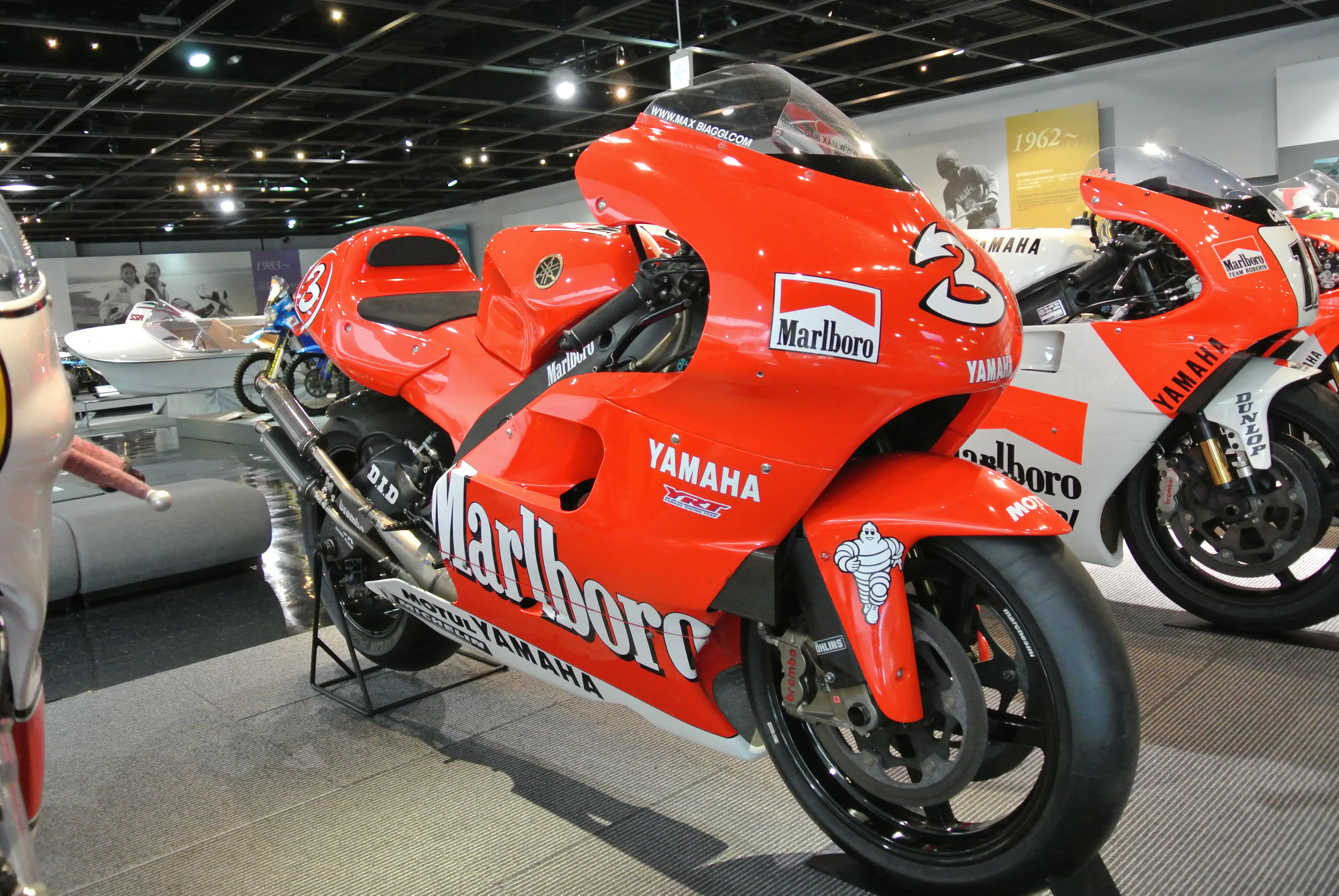
2001 Yamaha YZR500

Year	Model	Constructors' championship
1973	0W20: Liquid-cooled, inline-4, two-stroke engine, chromoly frame. Yamaha's first 500cc factory bike won from the outset at the first round of the 1973 season, ridden by Jarno Saarinen.	2nd
1974	0W23: Yamaha's first machine created specifically for 500cc racing. Yamaha won their first 500cc constructors' championship with it and in 1975 Giacomo Agostini rode the 0W23 to a world championship as well as giving Yamaha their second 500cc constructors' championship.	1st
1975	0W23: Yamaha's first machine created specifically for 500cc racing. Yamaha won their first 500cc constructors' championship with it and in 1975 Giacomo Agostini rode the 0W23 to a world championship as well as giving Yamaha their second 500cc constructors' championship.	1st
1976	For 1976, as the factory Yamaha team was dismantled, the 0W23 was handed to Venemotos for Johnny Cecotto, but Cecotto soon discarded the 500 because it was obsolete compared to the factory Suzuki and even to the RG Mk1 production racers.	2nd
1977	0W35: Changes were made to the valve intake system, stroke ratio, and carburetor.	2nd
1977	0W35K: Introduction of Yamaha's Power Valve System (YPVS). Kenny Roberts won his first of three championships with it.	2nd
1978	0W35K: Introduction of Yamaha's Power Valve System (YPVS). Kenny Roberts won his first of three championships with it.	2nd
1979	0W45	2nd
1980	0W48: Introduction of an aluminum frame to the YZR500.	2nd
1980	0W48R: At round 4 of the season, the YZR500 returned to a steel frame, and the engine had the outer cylinders reversed and thus rear-directional exhaust.	2nd
1981	0W53: Same rear-directional exhaust as the 0W48R, and the aluminum frame used a squared cross-section. Last inline-4 YZR500.	2nd
1981	0W54: Square-4 engine, rotary disc valve.	2nd
1982	0W60 Updated square-4 machine	2nd
1982	0W61: The first Japanese V4 engine in a 500cc Grand Prix motorcycle. Also had a new frame structure that was the basis for the Deltabox frame, which was developed by Spanish engineer Antonio Cobas.	2nd
1983	0W70: Introduction of the aluminum Deltabox frame and designed specifically for a 17-inch front wheel (from 18 inches).	2nd
1984	0W76: Crankcase reed valve system. Eddie Lawson wins the rider championship with it.	2nd
1985	0W81: Re-designed V-4 engine. Eddie Lawson won the riders' championship with it.	2nd
1986	0W81: Re-designed V-4 engine. Eddie Lawson won the riders' championship with it.	1st
1987	0W86: Improvements to the exhaust and cooling systems.	1st
1988	0W98: A new exhaust layout of both pipes going under the engine and out the right side required an asymmetrical swingarm. Eddie Lawson won the riders' championship on it.	1st
1989	0WA8: Introduction of a data-recording device.	2nd
1990	0WC1: Wayne Rainey won his first riders' championship on it.	1st
1991	0WD3: New regulation came into effect: the minimum weight would be 131 kg (for the four cylinders bikes). Yamaha used in this year first (and last) chip controlled suspension (CES).	1st
1992	0WE0: In the latter half of the season, Yamaha introduced their own "big-bang" firing order to the YZR500. Third championship for Wayne Rainey.	2nd
1993	0WF2: An extruded aluminum frame was designed to resist flex from increased power output, though Wayne Rainey complains that it is too stiff, and in round 8 Rainey switches to a chassis used by Team ROC.	1st
1994	0WF9: Re-design of the fairing and introduction of ram-air intake.	3rd
1995	0WF9: Re-design of the fairing and introduction of ram-air intake.	3rd
1996	0WJ1: New alloy for the engine and new design for the frame.	2nd
1997	0WH0: The "V" was widened to allow a larger air box. The 0WJ1 and 0WH0 were developed simultaneously and used in reverse order during the season.	2nd
1998	0WK1: Move to unleaded fuel.	2nd
1999	0WK1: Move to unleaded fuel.	2nd
2000	0WK6: General improvements to the engine, frame and cowl.	1st
2001	0WL6	2nd
2002	0WL9: The 28th and last generation of the YZR500 had to compete against the newly allowed 990cc 4-stroke machines, including Yamaha's own YZR-M1.	2nd

== See also ==
- Honda NSR500
- Suzuki RGV500
- Kawasaki KR500
- MV Agusta 500 Four
- Honda RC181
- Honda RC174
