= Kawasaki KR750 =

- Manufacturer: Kawasaki
- Production: 1975–1977
- Predecessor: Kawasaki H2R
- Class: racing (Formula 750)
- Engine: inline-triple, liquid-cooled, two-stroke, 747.4 cc (45.61 cu in)
- Bore / stroke: 68 mm × 68.6 mm (2.68 in × 2.70 in)
- Transmission: 6-speed gearbox
- Wheelbase: 1,430 mm (56.3 in)
- Related: Kawasaki KR500

The Kawasaki KR750 was a racing motorcycle built by Kawasaki. It featured a liquid-cooled, three-cylinder, two-stroke engine. In 1975, the first version (type 602) was approved by the AMA and in 1976 it was improved by fitting new brakes and forks. The update of this bike (type 602L) was introduced in 1977.
