= Kawasaki H1R =

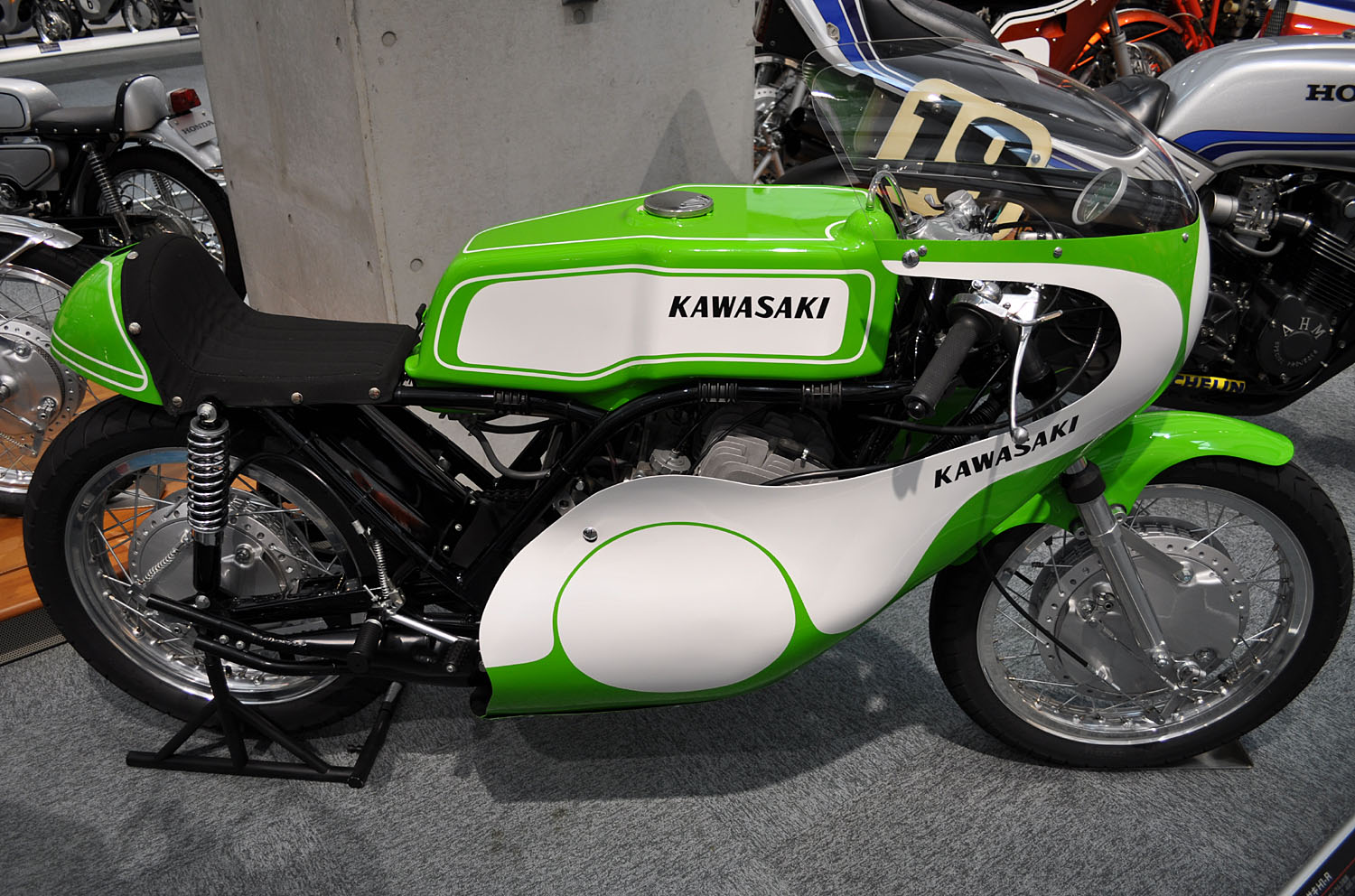
- Manufacturer: Kawasaki
- Production: 1969-1973
- Successor: Kawasaki KR500
- Class: racing (500 ccm class)
- Engine: 498.76 cc (30.436 cu in) two stroke, inline triple across the frame
- Bore / stroke: 60 mm × 58.8 mm (2.36 in × 2.31 in)
- Power: 61 kW (82 hp) @ 9,000 rpm
- Torque: 59 N⋅m (44 lbf⋅ft)
- Weight: 134 kg (295 lb) (dry)
- Related: Kawasaki H2R

The Kawasaki H1R was racing motorcycle manufactured by Kawasaki which competed in the 500 cc class of Grand Prix motorcycle racing. Based on the Kawasaki H1 street motorcycle, it was powered by a two stroke, three cylinder engine set across the frame. It was the first multi-cylinder two stroke racing motorcycle to be sold commercially to privateer racing teams.

In 1970, Ginger Molloy finished second to Giacomo Agostini on the dominant MV Agusta in the 500 cc world championship. Molloy scored 4 second places during the season as Kawasaki finished second in the constructors championship.

In 1971, Dave Simmonds rode the HR1 to victory at the season ending Spanish Grand Prix at Jarama when Agostini sat out the race after already winning the championship. It would mark Kawasaki's first victory in the premier 500 cc class. Simmonds also finished second to Agostini at the Finnish Grand Prix and had third places in Holland and Italy to secure fourth place in the riders championship while Kawasaki was third in the constructors championship.

After the 1972 season, Kawasaki finished the constructors' championship in fourth place. The best results of the year were a second place in Spain and a third at the East German GP.

== See also ==
- Kawasaki H2R
- Yamaha TZ750
- BSA/Triumph racing triples
