= Honda RC181 =

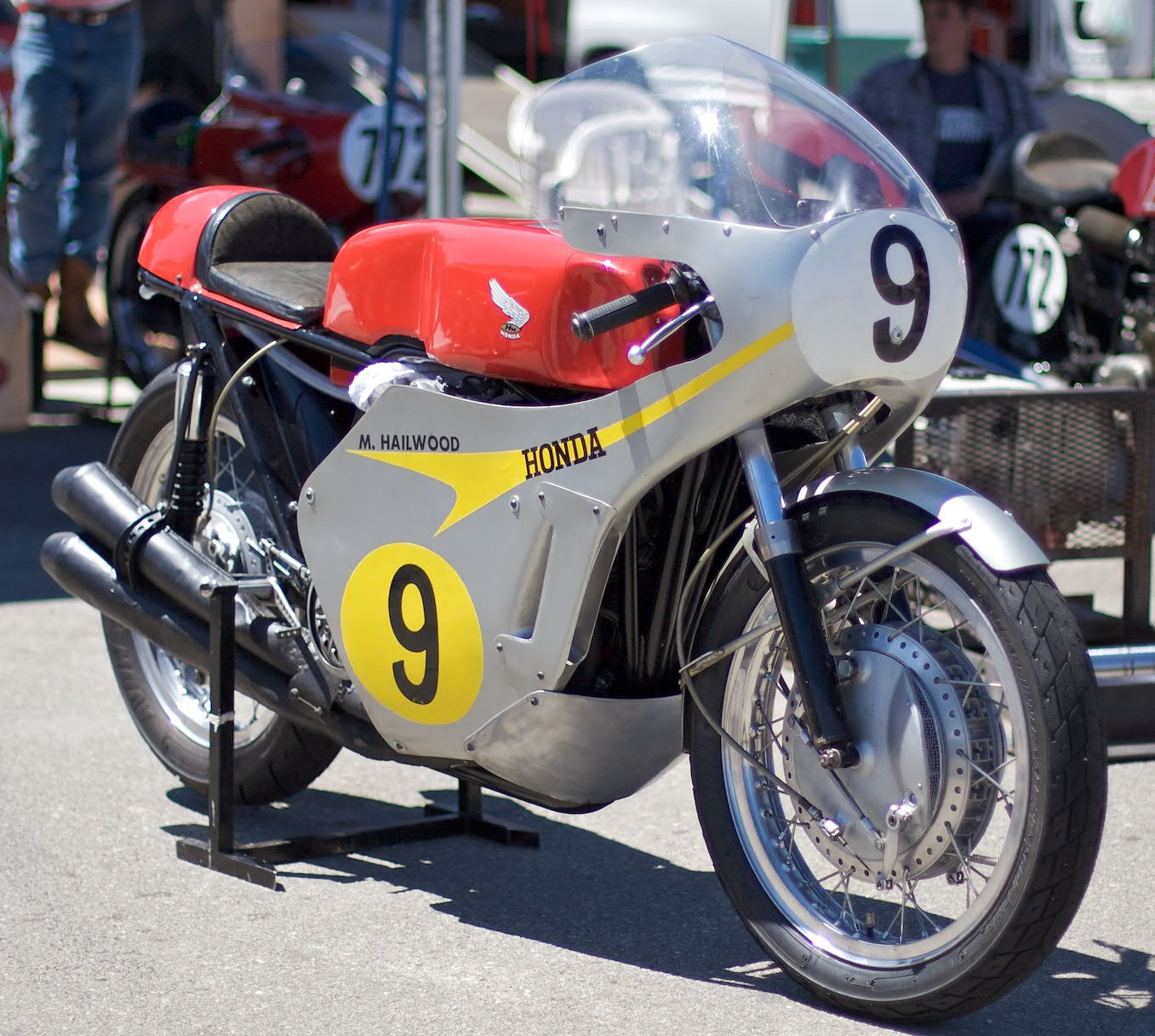
- Manufacturer: Honda
- Class: racing, 500 cc class
- Engine: 1966: 489.9 cc (30 cu in); 1967: 499.6 cc (30 cu in) four-stroke four cylinders inline
- Bore / stroke: 1966: 57 mm × 48 mm (2.2 in × 1.9 in); 1967: 57.56 mm × 48 mm (2.266 in × 1.890 in)
- Top speed: over 165 mph (266 km/h)
- Power: 1966: 85 hp (63 kW; 86 PS) @ 12,000 rpm 1967: 93 hp (69 kW; 94 PS) @ 12,600 rpm

The Honda RC181 was a road racing motorcycle built by Honda which raced in the 500cc class of Grand Prix motorcycle racing in the 1966 and 1967 seasons.

The bike debuted in 1966 and won five out of nine races that season, three with Mike Hailwood and two with Jim Redman. Hailwood finished second in the championship standings behind Giacomo Agostini on a MV Agusta. The Honda however won the constructor championship.

The next season Hailwood finished again second in the championship having the same number of points as the winner Agostini. At the end of the 1967 season Honda withdrew from the Grand Prix motorcycle racing. In the two seasons of racing in the 500cc class the Honda RC181 won ten races out of nineteen entered.

== See also ==
- 1966 Grand Prix motorcycle racing season
- 1967 Grand Prix motorcycle racing season
