= Honda RC174 =

Racing motorbike

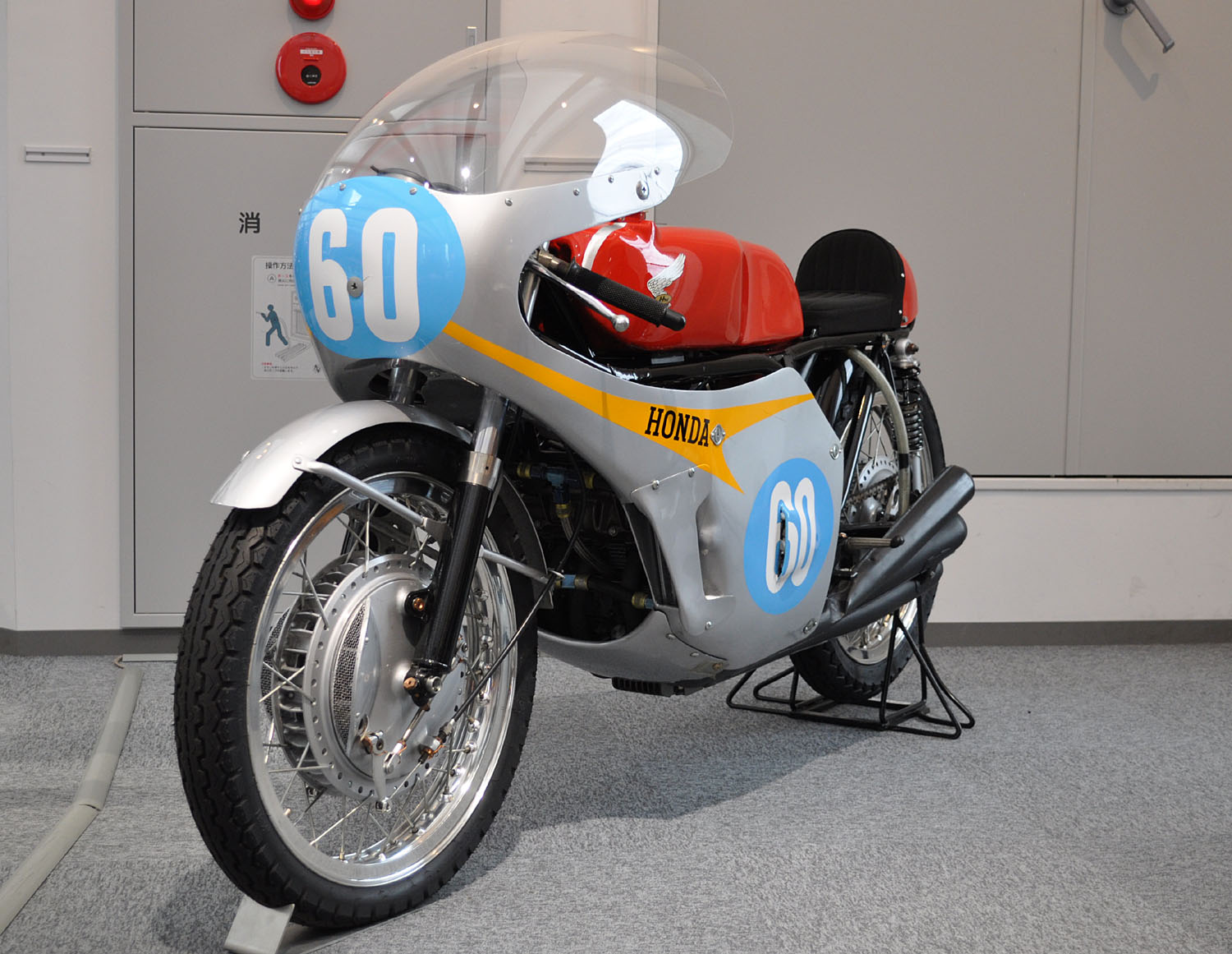
- Manufacturer: Honda
- Class: Road racing (350 cc class)
- Engine: 297 cc (18.1 cu in) four stroke, 6 cylinders inline across the frame
- Bore / stroke: 41 mm × 37.5 mm (1.61 in × 1.48 in)
- Power: 66 hp (49 kW; 67 PS) @ 17,000 rpm

The Honda RC174 was a racing motorcycle built by Honda for the 350 cc class of Grand Prix motorcycle racing in the 1967 season. Based on the 250 cc class Honda RC166, it had less than 300 cc, yet won seven out of the eight races in the championship that year. Mike Hailwood won the world championship and Honda won the constructors title.

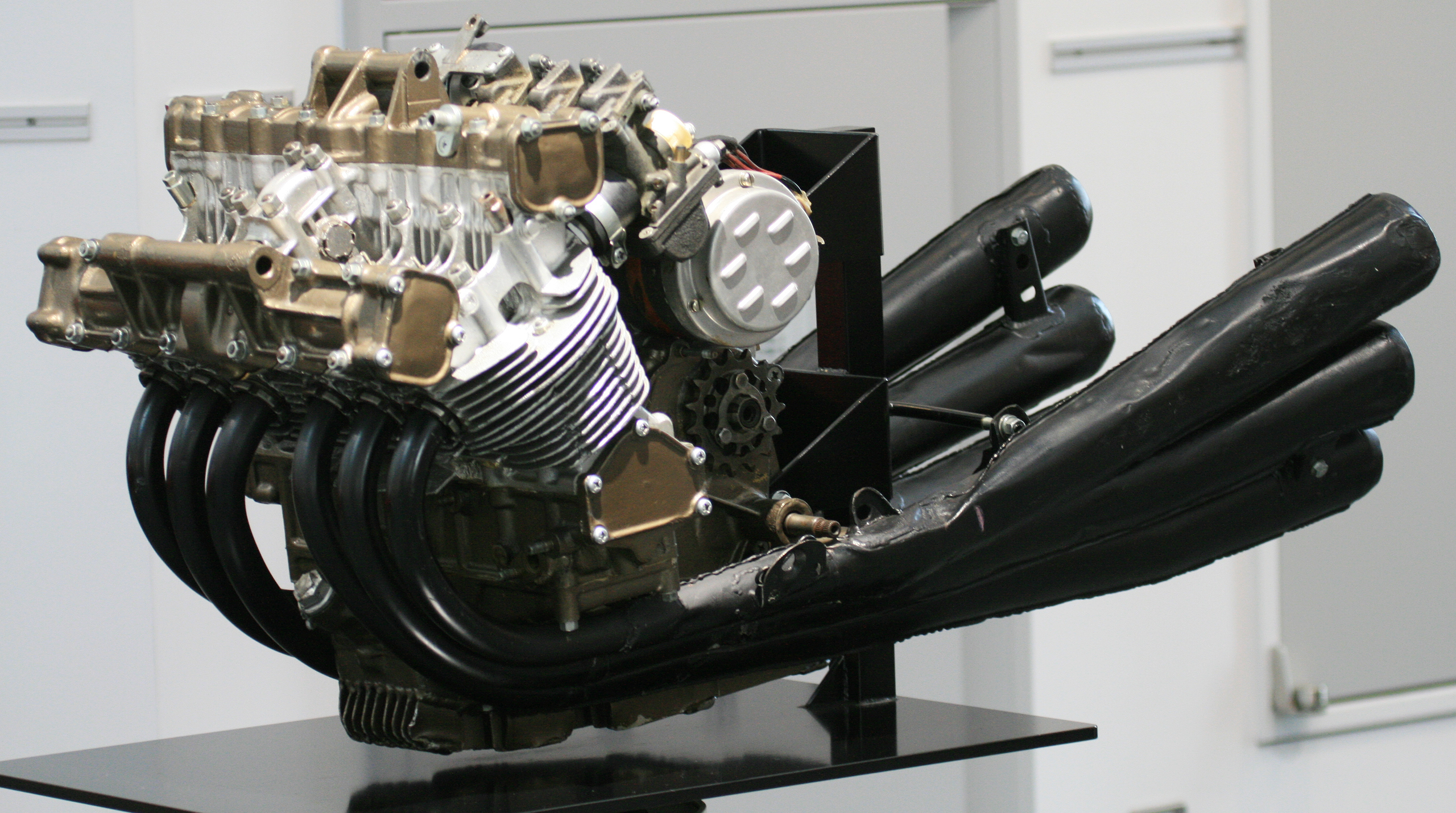
Honda RC174E engine

== See also ==
- 1967 Grand Prix motorcycle racing season
