= Yvon Duhamel =

Canadian motorcycle racer (1939–2021)

- Nationality: Canadian
- Born: 17 October 1939; Montreal, Canada
- Died: 17 August 2021 (aged 81); LaSalle, Quebec, Canada
Motorcycle racing career statistics
Grand Prix motorcycle racing
Active years	1967, 1975
First race	1967 Canadian Grand Prix
Last race	1975 250cc Dutch TT
Team	Kawasaki
Starts / Wins / Podiums / Poles / F. laps / Points; 2 / 0 / 0 / 0 / 0 / 9

Yvon Duhamel
- Born: October 17, 1939; Montreal, Quebec
- Died: August 17, 2021 (aged 81); LaSalle, Quebec
- Awards: 1970 World Championship Snowmobile Derby winner

NASCAR Cup Series career
- 1 race run over 1 year
- Best finish: 109th (1973)
- First race: 1973 Gwyn Staley 400 (North Wilkesboro)
- Last race: 1973 Gwyn Staley 400 (North Wilkesboro)
Wins	Top tens	Poles
0	1	0

Yvon Duhamel (October 17, 1939 – August 17, 2021) was a French Canadian professional motorcycle and snowmobile racer. A six-time winner of the White Trophy, the highest award in Canadian motorcycle racing, he was one of the most accomplished motorcycle racers in Canadian motorsports history. His motorcycle racing career spanned the transition from the 60 horsepower four-stroke motorcycles of the 1960s, to the 100 horsepower two-stroke motorcycles of the 1970s. Duhamel was a versatile rider competing in numerous motorcycle racing disciplines including; trials, motocross, ice racing, drag racing, flat track racing, and most prominently in road racing as a member of the Kawasaki factory racing team.

Duhamel developed a reputation as a tenacious competitor who always raced at his complete limit with great intensity and skill. His unyielding approach to racing often led to spectacular crashes as often as it led to race victories, although many of his crashes were attributed to mechanical failures rather than his unrelenting drive to win races. Duhamel's reputation as a tenacious competitor with an aggressive riding style earned him the respect of other racers and made him popular with racing fans.

Duhamel competed all year, racing motorcycles in the summer, then switching to snowmobile racing in the winter. He became one of the first factory supported snowmobile racers when he was selected to drive for the Ski-Doo factory racing team in 1969. His snowmobile racing accomplishments culminated with his induction into the Snowmobile Hall of Fame in 1988. In 1999, he was inducted into both the Canadian Motorsport Hall of Fame and the AMA Motorcycle Hall of Fame. In 2007, he was inducted into the Canadian Motorcycle Hall of Fame. Duhamel's sons, Miguel and Mario Duhamel, became successful motorcycle racers during the 1990s, with Miguel Duhamel winning the AMA Superbike championship in 1995 and becoming the all-time leading AMA Superbike race winner in 1998.

== Motorsports career ==
=== Early racing in Quebec ===
Duhamel was born in Montreal, Canada where he became an avid bicyclist and established a small bicycle repair shop in his older brother's service station when he was 13 years old. At the age of 15, he bought his first motorcycle, a 500cc Triumph T-100. In 1957, when Duhamel was 17, he began ice racing and the following year he began dirt track racing. He stood 5 ft 3 in (1.60 m) tall and weighed 125 pounds (57 kg), which gave him an advantage when racing against heavier competitors. Using borrowed riding gear, he finished second in his first dirt track race in Quebec. By 1959, his racing results earned him the sponsorship of local motorcycle dealer George Davis, who provided him with a BSA Gold Star for dirt track and road racing, and CZ and Jawa machines for motocross and ice racing. He supported his racing activities by working 18-hour days at his brother's service station.

Duhamel won the Canadian Motorcycle Association's prestigious White Memorial Trophy given to the best performance by a Canadian rider in all racing disciplines six times (1961-1962, 1965-1968). He won the CMA 500cc senior championship in 1961 and 1962, then won the CMA 250cc expert championship in 1964. In dirt track racing he was ranked the top rider in 1963 and then from 1965 to 1968. In motocross racing, he was the top ranked CMA rider in 1965 and 1966. In 1967, he won the CMA road racing championship.

=== Deeley Yamaha sponsorship ===
Davis helped launch Duhamel's professional racing career by connecting him with Trevor Deeley, the Canadian distributor for Yamaha motorcycles. His timing was fortuitous as Yamaha was about to introduce new two stroke engined motorcycles that would go on to dominate the next decade of motorcycle racing. In 1967, Canada hosted its first World Championship Grand Prix race at the Mosport Circuit, where Duhamel placed fourth in the 250cc class behind world championship regulars Mike Hailwood, Phil Read and Ralph Bryans.

Duhamel began competing for the Deeley Yamaha team at AMA races in the United States such as the Daytona 200 and the Loudon Classic. At the 1968 Daytona 200, he won the 250 lightweight support class ahead of reigning world champion Phil Read, then in the 200-mile main event, he rode a 350cc Yamaha to finish second behind Harley-Davidson’s Cal Rayborn, becoming one of the first two-stroke riders to make a Daytona podium finish. His second place finishing position would be the best result of his career at the Daytona 200, which at the time was considered one of the most prestigious motorcycle races in North America. His son Miguel Duhamel would become a five-time winner of the event.

Duhamel also raced in AMA Grand National dirt track events during this period with his best result being a sixth place in the 1968 Sacramento Mile, but uncompetitive dirt track machinery kept him from seriously contesting the Grand National championship. In Canadian racing, he won the 1968 CMA 500cc expert ice racing championship and scored a second place in the 1968 Canadian observed trials national championship.

Duhamel participated in the opening round of the 1968 Inter-AMA motocross series in Pepperell, Massachusetts riding a ČZ motorcycle against European factory racers such as Roger De Coster, Joël Robert and Bengt Åberg. In the winter of 1969, Duhamel was selected to drive for Ski-Doo factory racing team, becoming one of the sport's first factory supported snowmobile racers.

Duhamel returned to Daytona in March 1969 and repeated his victory in the Daytona 250 lightweight class, beating future 250cc world champion Rodney Gould. He then accomplished one of his most impressive achievements at Daytona when he won the pole position for the 1969 Daytona 200, becoming the first rider to qualify for the event with a lap speed above 150 mph. Duhamel's pole position on the tiny 350cc Yamaha motorcycle against the larger 750cc four-strokes marked the beginning of the two-stroke era in AMA road racing competitions. Although he started from the pole position, he would retire from the race due to a mechanical failure. He also won the 250cc class at Indianapolis in 1969.

That winter, Duhamel achieved one of the most impressive victories of his snowmobile racing career when he won the 1970 World Championship Snowmobile Derby held in Eagle River, Wisconsin.

Beginning in 1970, Duhamel would concentrate his motorcycle activities solely on road racing while continuing to race snowmobiles in the winter. In March 1970 at the Daytona 200, Duhamel's aggressive riding style was highlighted when he was relegated to the last row of the starting grid because he had crashed during his qualifying heat race. Once the race started, Duhamel moved up through the field from 79th place to challenge for third place before finishing in fourth place at the end of the race. Later that season he took the 250cc race victory at the Loudon Classic after a fierce battle with Gary Nixon ended when Nixon's bike broke down. In October 1970, Duhamel and Nixon were invited to England to race in the Mallory Park Race of the Year, becoming the first AMA racers to compete in the prestigious event. Duhamel placed ninth on a Yamaha TD2 borrowed from a local Yamaha distributor.

In the winter of 1971, Duhamel nearly repeated his victory at the World Championship Snowmobile Derby, but lost in an epic battle with Mike Trapp in one of the most exciting races in the history of the sport.

=== Kawasaki factory racing team ===
I don't ever race with Yvon. Either he just plain leaves, or blows up, or runs off the track, so I never have raced with him.

— AMA Hall of Famer Dick Mann

For the 1971 season, Duhamel signed a lucrative contract with the Kawasaki factory racing team to compete in the AMA road racing nationals with 1963 Daytona 200 winner, Ralph White as his teammate. The Kawasaki H1R was known as a fast but fragile motorcycle with an explosive power delivery and brutal riding characteristics that made it extremely difficult to ride. He started the 1971 season poorly, with crashes at the Daytona 200 as well as the following round at Road Atlanta.

At the Pocono Raceway national, Duhamel was clearly the fastest rider on the track, but the excessive fuel consumption of Kawasaki's two-stroke engine forced him to make two fuel stops to the single pit stops of his competitors, allowing Dick Mann to take the victory on a BSA Rocket 3 four-stroke. Despite having a temperamental motorcycle, Duhamel was able to give Kawasaki its first AMA national victory on September 5, 1971, at the Talladega Superspeedway, a wide open track which favored Kawasaki's horsepower advantage. The season ending Champion Spark Plug Classic held at the Ontario Motor Speedway was run in two 125-mile segments. Duhamel battled back and forth with Gary Nixon for the lead in the first heat, but the Kawasaki's fuel consumption forced him to make a pit stop for fuel, handing the victory to Nixon.

In the winter of 1972, Duhamel won the grueling, three-day Winnipeg-to-St. Paul I-500 snowmobile race, giving the Ski-Doo factory their only victory in that event. Also in 1972, he helped Ski-Doo set a snowmobile land speed record when he drove a Ski‐Doo XR2 to a clocked speed of 127.3 mph at Booneville, New York.

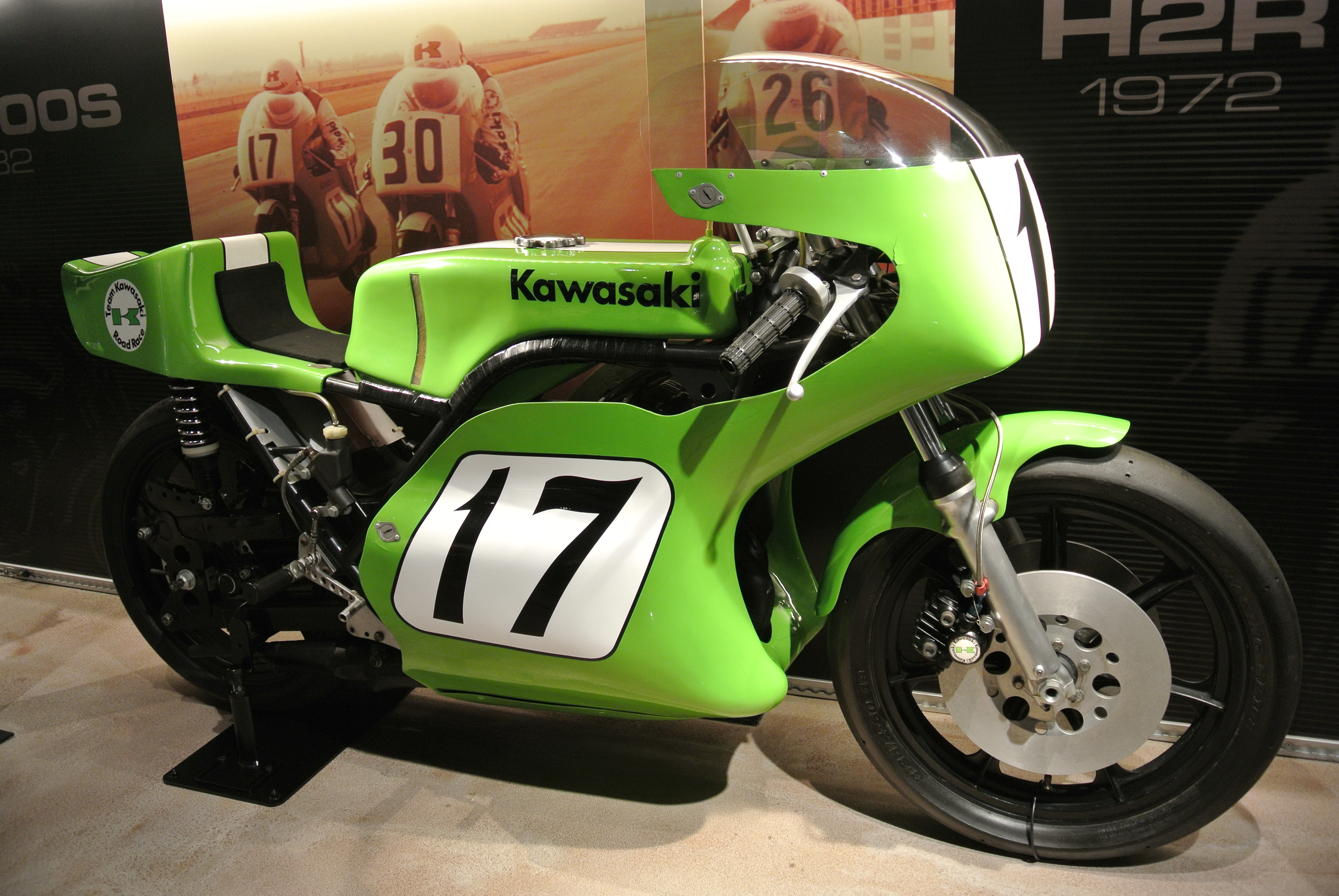
1972 Kawasaki H2R with the #17 used by Duhamel in AMA racing.

For 1972 season, White departed and Duhamel was joined by new teammates Gary Nixon and Paul Smart. Kawasaki introduced the H2R wearing the team's trademark neon lime green racing livery. Engine problems forced his retirement from the season-opening Daytona 200, but at the following round at Road Atlanta, he placed second to Suzuki factory team rider, Jody Nicholas, then was awarded the victory after AMA officials discovered illegal cylinder heads on Nicholas' Suzuki. At the 1972 Indianapolis national, Duhamel surged into the lead only to have to make a pit stop for mechanical adjustments before rejoining the race in 17th place. His aggressiveness on the race track was once again demonstrated as he raced his way through the field of competitors to finish the race in second place, 32 seconds behind race winner Cal Rayborn.

At the 1972 Laguna Seca National, Duhamel qualified on pole position, then crashed in the first turn taking out Cliff Carr and Dick Mann in the process. It was later revealed that a piston seizure had caused his rear wheel to lock up. At Talladega, he duplicated his 1971 National victory, where he lapped the entire field up to his second-placed teammate, Gary Nixon. At the season ending Champion Spark Plug Classic held at the Ontario Motor Speedway, Duhamel once again showed his aggressive racing style against a field of international competitors that included Phil Read, Jarno Saarinen, Renzo Pasolini, Kel Carruthers, and Kenny Roberts. The race was held with two legs and a 45 minute intermission. Duhamel was forced to start the race from the last row of the starting grid after crashing during his qualifying heat race. Once the race began, he surged from 53rd position to 21st place on the first lap. He continued to charge through the field to capture the race lead by lap 16, only to crash out of the race while trying to pass a lapped rider. He started the second leg from the last row due to his first leg crash and worked his way through the field from 37th to 12th place but, retired due to his injury from his first race crash.

At the 1973 Daytona 200, Duhamel and teammate Art Baumann had built a large lead early in the race, only to crash simultaneously on spilled gasoline from a previous crash while entering turn one. His strong performances in AMA competition earned him a place on the North American team for the 1973 Transatlantic Trophy match races. The Transatlantic Trophy match races pitted the best British riders against the top North American road racers on 750cc motorcycles in a six-race series in England. Duhamel ended the series as the top individual points leader with one victory along with two second place finishes.

On April 8, 1973, Duhamel raced a NASCAR Winston Cup race in the 1973 Gwyn Staley 400 held at the North Wilkesboro Speedway. He finished tenth for Junie Donlavey in the No. 90 Truxmore Ford after starting 15th, completing 381 laps of the 400-lap race. Despite his respectable result, Duhamel never switched to car racing due his advanced age and for the fact that he was being paid well to race motorcycles.

Yvon crashes a lot. But a lot of it is his bike.

— AMA Hall of Famer Kenny Roberts

In the 1973 AMA Grand National championship, Duhamel once again suffered a crash at the Laguna Seca National, where he was exonerated from blame when it was revealed that a failed crankshaft seal had allowed oil onto the rear tire. He recovered to win the last two road races of the season with victories at the Charlotte and Ontario speedways. At Ontario, he led a Kawasaki podium sweep with teammates Gary Nixon and Art Baumann finishing second and third. Kawasaki's domination during this period led motorsports journalists to dub the team as "the Green Meanies", in reference to their lime green paint scheme.

The 1973 season was the highpoint of Duhamel's Kawasaki career, as the 1973 oil crisis precipitated a drop in sales of recreational vehicles, which forced the Kawasaki team to reduce their racing budget for the 1974 season. The Kawasaki H2R received no development over the winter, and this showed in the team's dismal racing results in 1974. Duhamel's career was also impacted by the introduction of the Yamaha TZ750 in 1974, as the Yamaha became the dominant road racing motorcycle for the next decade with riders such as Kenny Roberts and Steve Baker. He returned as the North American team captain for the 1974 Transatlantic Trophy match races, but because Kawasaki had reduced their racing budget, Duhamel was forced to ride substandard machines. He beat Kenny Roberts and set a new lap record in the first race of the series held at the Brands Hatch circuit but, he proceeded to crash out of subsequent races due to piston seizures. Duhamel sat out the last race of the series out of frustration with his equipment.

American road racing was at a low point in 1974 with only three road races on the AMA National calendar, so Kawasaki decided to focus their attention on Grand Prix motorcycle racing in Europe. Duhamel's popularity among race fans had grown to where he had become one of the most popular motorcycle racers in France. For the 1974 season, he was given the opportunity to compete in the premier 500cc class riding a 500cc H1-RW for the French Kawasaki importer.

At the season-opening French Grand Prix held at the challenging Circuit de Charade, Duhamel's Kawasaki suffered a mechanical failure on the third lap of the race. With the arrival of the new water-cooled Suzuki RG 500 and the Yamaha YZR500, Kawasaki's air-cooled triple was rendered obsolete. After the Nations Grand Prix, Duhamel would not participate in any further 500cc races, preferring to concentrate on the Formula 750 championship. At the British round of the 1974 Formula 750 season held at the Silverstone Circuit on August 11, he scored a second place behind his former teammate Paul Smart, now riding for the Suzuki factory racing team.

Kawasaki introduced the KR750 for the 1975 season and Duhamel used it to place a close second to multi-time world champion Giacomo Agostini at the 1975 Paul Ricard 200 race, despite having to make two fuel stops to Agostini's one stop. On June 28, 1975, he scored a fifth place finish at the 250cc Dutch TT, giving Kawasaki its best result of the year in the 250cc world championships. He returned to the Assen Circuit on July 9, 1975, and won the Dutch round of the 1975 Formula 750 season. He also competed in the FIM Endurance World Championship at the 24 Hours of Le Mans and teamed up with Jean-François Baldé to place third at the 1975 Bol d'Or 24-hour endurance race.

The AMA introduced its first road racing category for production class motorcycles as a support class for the 1975 Laguna Seca national. Kawasaki entered Duhamel on a modified version of the Kawasaki Z1 and, despite his small stature, he was able to muscle the motorcycle to victory. At the next race held at the Pocono Raceway, he entered the production class race riding a 750cc Kawasaki H2 two stroke motorcycle and won the race. The victory marked the last time a two stroke motorcycle would win a production class race at an AMA road racing event. When many of the top American motorcycle racers were disdainful of the new race category because they did not consider production class motorcycles as proper racing machinery, Duhamel's participation gave credibility to the fledgling class. The production class series would eventually become the AMA Superbike Championship in 1986.

Duhamel was the sole rider on the Kawasaki factory team in 1976, signed to enter in only three AMA races as he began to reduce his riding schedule. He had lost his motivation due to the frequent mechanical failures of the Kawasaki as, the Yamaha TZ750 began to dominate the 750cc class. Duhamel scored two more podium results in the Canadian rounds of the Formula 750 championship in 1977 and 1978 in his final appearances as a member of the Kawasaki factory racing team.

=== Later life ===
Never officially retired, Duhamel reduced his racing activities in the 1980s as he became involved in his sons' racing careers. He funded their early motorcycle racing and helped driving their motor home to race venues. His last major race occurred in 1988 when he teamed up with his sons to compete in the Bol D’Or 24-hour endurance race. He continued to race in historic motorsport events as a member of Team Obsolete in the AHRMA Historic National Series. At the age of 53, he claimed three victories at the 1992 Daytona 200 support races, winning the Formula GP Heavyweight class, the Formula 750 class, and finally the BMW Battle of the Legends class. Duhamel was forced to stop racing after suffering injuries in a bad crash during a vintage motorcycle event at the Mosport Circuit.

Duhamel was inducted into the Snowmobile Hall of Fame in 1988, both the Canadian Motorsport Hall of Fame and the AMA Motorcycle Hall of Fame in 1999, and in 2007 he was inducted into the Canadian Motorcycle Hall of Fame. A snowmobile race track at the Grand Prix Ski-Doo de Valcourt sports venue in Valcourt, Quebec was named Circuit Yvon Duhamel in honor of his snowmobile career. He died on August 17, 2021, in La Salle, Quebec, at the age of 81. Duhamel, who raced with the number 17 on his motorcycles, was born and died on the 17th day of the month.

== Motorsports career results ==
=== Grand Prix motorcycle racing results ===
**Position**	1	2	3	4	5	6	7	8	9	10
**Points**	15	12	10	8	6	5	4	3	2	1

(key) (Races in bold indicate pole position; races in italics indicate fastest lap)

Year	Class	Team	Machine	1	2	3	4	5	6	7	8	9	10	11	12	13	Points	Rank	Wins
1967	250cc	Deeley-Yamaha	RD56	ESP -	GER -	FRA -	IOM -	NED -	BEL -	DDR -	CZE -	FIN -	ULS -	NAT -	CAN; 4	JPN -	3	14th	0
1967	500cc	Matchless	G50		GER -		IOM -	NED -	BEL -	DDR -	CZE -	FIN -	ULS -	NAT -	CAN; Ret		0	-	0
1974	500cc	Kawasaki	H1R	FRA; Ret	GER -	AUT -	NAT; Ret	IOM -	NED -	BEL -	SWE -	FIN -	CZE -				0	-	0
1974	Formula 750	Kawasaki	H2R	ESP -	FIN -	GBR; 2											12	7th	0
1975	250cc	Kawasaki	KR250	FRA -	ESP -	GER -		NAT -	IOM -	NED; 5	BEL -	SWE -	FIN -	CZE -	YUG -		6	24th	0
1975	500cc	Kawasaki	H1R	FRA -		GER -	AUT -	NAT -	IOM -	NED; Ret	BEL -	SWE -	FIN -	CZE -			0	-	0
1975	Formula 750	Kawasaki	KR750	USA -	ITA -	BEL -	FRA -	SWE -	FIN -	GBR -	NED; 1	GER -					15	15th	1
1976	Formula 750	Kawasaki	KR750	USA -	VEN -	ITA -	ESP -	BEL -	FRA -	GBR -	NED; 7	GER -					4	31st	0
1977	Formula 750	Kawasaki	KR750	USA -	ITA -	ESP -	FRA -	GBR -	AUT -	BEL -	NED -	USA -	CAN; 2	GER -			12	16th	0
1978	Formula 750	Kawasaki	KR750	ITA -	FRA -	GBR -	AUT -	ESP -	GER -	BEL -	NED -	USA -	CAN; 3				10	15th	0

=== NASCAR Winston Cup Series ===
(key) (Bold – Pole position awarded by qualifying time. Italics – Pole position earned by points standings or practice time. * – Most laps led.)

NASCAR Winston Cup Series results
Year	Team	No.	Make	1	2	3	4	5	6	7	8	9	10	11	12	13	14	15	16	17	18	19	20	21	22	23	24	25	26	27	28	NWCC	Pts
1973	Donlavey Racing	90	Ford	RSD	DAY	RCH	CAR	BRI	ATL	NWS; 10	DAR	MAR	TAL	NSV	CLT	DOV	TWS	RSD	MCH	DAY	BRI	ATL	TAL	NSV	DAR	RCH	DOV	NWS	MAR	CLT	CAR	109th	0
