= List of 1976 motorsport champions =

1976 motorsport champions
Previous: 1975	Next: 1977

This list of 1976 motorsport champions is a list of national or international auto racing series with a Championship decided by the points or positions earned by a driver from multiple races.

== Drag racing ==
Series	Champion	Refer
NHRA Winston Drag Racing Series	Top Fuel: (United States) Richard Tharp	1975 NHRA Winston Drag Racing Series
NHRA Winston Drag Racing Series	Funny Car: (United States) Don Prudhomme	1975 NHRA Winston Drag Racing Series
NHRA Winston Drag Racing Series	Pro Stock: (United States) Larry Lombardo	1975 NHRA Winston Drag Racing Series

== Karting ==
Series	Driver	Season article
Karting World Championship	(Italy) Felice Rovelli	
Karting World Championship	Junior: (Italy) Andrea de Cesaris	
Karting European Championship	FC: (Italy) Gianfranco Baroni	

== Motorcycle racing ==
Series	Driver	Season article
500cc World Championship	(United Kingdom) Barry Sheene	1976 Grand Prix motorcycle racing season
350cc World Championship	(Italy) Walter Villa	1976 Grand Prix motorcycle racing season
250cc World Championship	(Italy) Walter Villa	1976 Grand Prix motorcycle racing season
125cc World Championship	(Italy) Pier Paolo Bianchi	1976 Grand Prix motorcycle racing season
50cc World Championship	(Spain) Ángel Nieto	1976 Grand Prix motorcycle racing season
Speedway World Championship	(England) Peter Collins	1976 Individual Speedway World Championship
AMA Superbike Championship	(United Kingdom) Reg Pridmore	
Formula 750	(Spain) Víctor Palomo	1976 Formula 750 season

=== Motocross ===
Series	Driver	Season article
FIM Motocross World Championship	500cc: (Belgium) Roger De Coster	1976 FIM Motocross World Championship
FIM Motocross World Championship	250cc: (Finland) Heikki Mikkola	1976 FIM Motocross World Championship
FIM Motocross World Championship	125cc: (Belgium) Gaston Rahier	1976 FIM Motocross World Championship

== Open wheel racing ==
Series	Driver	Season article
Formula One World Championship	(United Kingdom) James Hunt	1976 Formula One season
Formula One World Championship	Constructors: (Italy) Ferrari	1976 Formula One season
USAC National Championship	(United States) Gordon Johncock	1976 USAC Championship Car season
European Formula Two Championship	(France) Jean-Pierre Jabouille	1976 European Formula Two Championship
All-Japan Formula 2000 Championship	(Japan) Noritake Takahara	1976 All-Japan Formula 2000 Championship
Australian Formula 2 Championship	(Australia) Graeme Crawford	1976 Australian Formula 2 Championship
Australian Drivers' Championship	(Australia) John Leffler	1976 Australian Drivers' Championship
Cup of Peace and Friendship	(Czechoslovakia) Jiří Červa	1976 Cup of Peace and Friendship
Cup of Peace and Friendship	Nations: Czechoslovakia	1976 Cup of Peace and Friendship
Formula Atlantic CASC	(Canada) Gilles Villeneuve	1976 Formula Atlantic season CASC
Formula Atlantic IMSA	(Canada) Gilles Villeneuve	1976 Formula Atlantic season IMSA
Formula Nacional	(Spain) Pere Nogues	1976 Formula Nacional
Rothmans International Series	(Australia) Vern Schuppan	1976 Rothmans International Series
Shellsport International Series	(United Kingdom) David Purley	1976 Shellsport International Series
SCCA/USAC Formula 5000 Championship	(United Kingdom) Brian Redman	1976 SCCA/USAC Formula 5000 Championship
SCCA Formula Super Vee	(United States) Tom Bagley	1976 SCCA Formula Super Vee season
South African Formula Atlantic Championship	(South Africa) Ian Scheckter	1976 South African Formula Atlantic Championship
South African National Drivers Championship	(South Africa) Ian Scheckter	1976 South African National Drivers Championship
Formula Three
FIA European Formula 3 Championship	(Italy) Riccardo Patrese	1976 FIA European Formula 3 Championship
British Formula Three Championship	(United Kingdom) Rupert Keegan	1976 British Formula Three season
Chilean Formula Three Championship	(Chile) Juan Carlos Silva	1976 Chilean Formula Three Championship
German Formula Three Championship	(West Germany) Bertram Schäfer	1976 German Formula Three Championship
Italian Formula Three Championship	(Italy) Riccardo Patrese	1976 Italian Formula Three Championship
Italian Formula Three Championship	Teams: (Italy) Trivellato Racing	1976 Italian Formula Three Championship
Soviet Formula 3 Championship	(Soviet Union) Wladislav Barkowski	1976 Soviet Formula 3 Championship
Formula Renault
French Formula Renault Championship	(France) Alain Prost	1976 French Formula Renault Championship
Formula Ford
Australian Formula Ford Championship	(Australia) Richard Carter	1976 TAA Formula Ford Driver to Europe Series
Brazilian Formula Ford Championship	(Brazil) José Pedro Chateaubriand	
British Formula Ford Championship	(Republic of Ireland) David Kennedy	
British Formula Ford 2000 Championship	(United Kingdom) Ian Taylor	
Danish Formula Ford Championship	(Denmark) Søren Aggerholm	
Dutch Formula Ford 1600 Championship	(Netherlands) Michael Bleekemolen	1976 Dutch Formula Ford 1600 Championship
German Formula Ford Championship	(Germany) Tibor Meray	
New Zealand Formula Ford Championship	(New Zealand) Dave McMillan	
Swedish Formula Ford Championship	(Sweden) Conny Ljungfeldt	

== Rallying ==
Series	Driver	Season article
World Rally Championship	(Italy) Lancia	1976 World Rally Championship
Australian Rally Championship	(Australia) Ross Dunkerton	1976 Australian Rally Championship
Australian Rally Championship	Co-Drivers: (Australia) Jeff Beaumont	1976 Australian Rally Championship
British Rally Championship	(Finland) Ari Vatanen	1976 British Rally Championship
British Rally Championship	Co-Drivers: (United Kingdom) Peter Bryant	1976 British Rally Championship
Canadian Rally Championship	(Canada) Jean-Paul Perusse	1976 Canadian Rally Championship
Canadian Rally Championship	Co-Drivers: (Canada) John Bellefleur	1976 Canadian Rally Championship
Deutsche Rallye Meisterschaft	(Germany) Heinz-Walter Schewe	
Estonian Rally Championship	(Estonian Soviet Socialist Republic) Madis Possul	1976 Estonian Rally Championship
Estonian Rally Championship	Co-Drivers: (Estonian Soviet Socialist Republic) Väino Touart	1976 Estonian Rally Championship
European Rally Championship	(France) Bernard Darniche	1976 European Rally Championship
European Rally Championship	Co-Drivers: (France) Alain Mahé	1976 European Rally Championship
Finnish Rally Championship	Group 1: (Finland) Kyösti Hämäläinen	1976 Finnish Rally Championship
Finnish Rally Championship	Group 2: (Finland) Heikki Vilkman	1976 Finnish Rally Championship
Finnish Rally Championship	Group 4: (Finland) Tapio Rainio	1976 Finnish Rally Championship
French Rally Championship	(France) Bernard Darniche	
Hungarian Rally Championship	(Hungary) Attila Ferjáncz	
Hungarian Rally Championship	Co-Drivers: (Hungary) Ferenc Iriczfalvy	
Italian Rally Championship	(Italy) Antonio Fassina	
Italian Rally Championship	Co-Drivers: (Italy) Mauro Mannini	
Italian Rally Championship	Manufacturers: (Italy) Lancia	
New Zealand Rally Championship	(New Zealand) Rod Millen	1976 New Zealand Rally Championship
Polish Rally Championship	(Poland) Tomasz Ciecierzyński	
Romanian Rally Championship	(Romania) Ștefan Iancovici	
Scottish Rally Championship	(United Kingdom) Andrew Cowan	
Scottish Rally Championship	Co-Drivers: (United Kingdom) Hugh McNeill	
South African National Rally Championship	(South Africa) Jan Hettema	
South African National Rally Championship	Co-Drivers: (South Africa) Stuart Pegg	
South African National Rally Championship	Manufacturers: (United States) Ford	
Spanish Rally Championship	(Spain) Antonio Zanini	
Spanish Rally Championship	Co-Drivers: (Spain) Víctor Sabater	

=== Rallycross ===
Series	Driver	Season article
FIA European Rallycross Championship	(Austria) Franz Wurz	
British Rallycross Championship	(United Kingdom) Trevor Hopkins	

== Sports car and GT ==
Series	Driver	Season article
World Sportscar Championship	(West Germany) Porsche	1976 World Sportscar Championship
World Championship for Makes	(West Germany) Porsche	1976 World Championship for Makes
IMSA GT Championship	(United States) Al Holbert	1976 IMSA GT Championship

== Stock car racing ==
Series	Driver	Season article
NASCAR Winston Cup Series	(United States) Cale Yarborough	1976 NASCAR Winston Cup Series
NASCAR Winston Cup Series	Manufacturers: (United States) Chevrolet	1976 NASCAR Winston Cup Series
NASCAR Winston West Series	(United States) Chuck Bown	1976 NASCAR Winston West Series
ARCA Racing Series	(United States) Dave Dayton	1976 ARCA Racing Series
Turismo Carretera	(Argentina) Héctor Gradassi	1976 Turismo Carretera
USAC Stock Car National Championship	(United States) Butch Hartman	1976 USAC Stock Car National Championship

== Touring car ==
Series	Driver	Season article
European Touring Car Championship	(Belgium) Jean Xhenceval (Belgium) Pierre Dieudonné	1976 European Touring Car Championship
Australian Touring Car Championship	(Canada) Allan Moffat	1976 Australian Touring Car Championship
British Saloon Car Championship	(United Kingdom) Bernard Unett	1976 British Saloon Car Championship
Coupe d'Europe Renault 5 Alpine	(France) Yves Frémont	1976 Coupe d'Europe Renault 5 Alpine
Deutsche Rennsport Meisterschaft	(Germany) Hans Heyer	1976 Deutsche Rennsport Meisterschaft
French Supertouring Championship	(France) Jean-Pierre Beltoise	1976 French Supertouring Championship

== See also ==
- List of motorsport championships
- Auto racing
