= List of 1975 motorsport champions =

1975 motorsport champions
| Previous: 1974 | Next: 1976 |

This list of 1975 motorsport champions is a list of national or international auto racing series with a Championship decided by the points or positions earned by a driver from multiple races.

== Drag racing ==
| Series | Champion | Refer |
|---|---|---|
| NHRA Winston Drag Racing Series | Top Fuel: (United States) Don Garlits | 1975 NHRA Winston Drag Racing Series |
| NHRA Winston Drag Racing Series | Funny Car: (United States) Don Prudhomme | 1975 NHRA Winston Drag Racing Series |
| NHRA Winston Drag Racing Series | Pro Stock: (United States) Bob Glidden | 1975 NHRA Winston Drag Racing Series |

== Karting ==
| Series | Driver | Season article |
|---|---|---|
| Karting World Championship | (Belgium) François Goldstein | |
| Karting World Championship | Junior: (Switzerland) Adrian Wepfer | |
| Karting European Championship | 100cc: (Italy) Gabriele Gorini | |
| Karting European Championship | FC: (Netherlands) Ben van Velzen | |

== Motorcycle racing ==
| Series | Driver | Season article |
|---|---|---|
| 500cc World Championship | (Italy) Giacomo Agostini | 1975 Grand Prix motorcycle racing season |
| 350cc World Championship | (Venezuela) Johnny Cecotto | 1975 Grand Prix motorcycle racing season |
| 250cc World Championship | (Italy) Walter Villa | 1975 Grand Prix motorcycle racing season |
| 125cc World Championship | (Italy) Paolo Pileri | 1975 Grand Prix motorcycle racing season |
| 50cc World Championship | (Spain) Ángel Nieto | 1975 Grand Prix motorcycle racing season |
| Formula 750 | (Australia) Jack Findlay | 1975 Formula 750 season |
| Speedway World Championship | (Denmark) Ole Olsen | 1975 Individual Speedway World Championship |

=== Motocross ===
| Series | Driver | Season article |
|---|---|---|
| FIM Motocross World Championship | 500cc: (Belgium) Roger De Coster | 1975 FIM Motocross World Championship |
| FIM Motocross World Championship | 250cc: (Belgium) Harry Everts | 1975 FIM Motocross World Championship |
| FIM Motocross World Championship | 125cc: (Belgium) Gaston Rahier | 1975 FIM Motocross World Championship |

== Open wheel racing ==
| Series | Driver | Season article |
|---|---|---|
| Formula One World Championship | (Austria) Niki Lauda | 1975 Formula One season |
| Formula One World Championship | Constructors: (Italy) Ferrari | 1975 Formula One season |
| USAC National Championship | (United States) A. J. Foyt | 1975 USAC Championship Car season |
| European Formula Two Championship | (France) Jacques Laffite | 1975 European Formula Two Championship |
| European Formula 5000 Championship | (Belgium) Teddy Pilette | 1975 ShellSPORT 5000 European Championship |
| Tasman Series | (Australia) Warwick Brown | 1975 Tasman Series |
| All-Japan Formula 2000 Championship | (Japan) Kazuyoshi Hoshino | 1975 All-Japan Formula 2000 Championship |
| Atlantic Championship Series | (Canada) Bill Brack | 1975 Formula Atlantic season |
| Australian Drivers' Championship | (Australia) John McCormack | 1975 Australian Drivers' Championship |
| Australian Formula 2 Championship | (Australia) Geoff Brabham | 1975 Australian Formula 2 Championship |
| Cup of Peace and Friendship | (Soviet Union) Madis Laiv | 1975 Cup of Peace and Friendship |
| Cup of Peace and Friendship | Nations: Soviet Union | 1975 Cup of Peace and Friendship |
| Formula Nacional | (Spain) Luis Canomanuel | 1975 Formula Nacional |
| SCCA Continental Championship | (United Kingdom) Brian Redman | 1975 SCCA/USAC Formula 5000 Championship |
| SCCA Formula Super Vee | (United States) Eddie Miller | 1975 SCCA Formula Super Vee season |
| South African Formula One Championship | (South Africa) Dave Charlton | 1975 South African Formula One Championship |
| Soviet Formula 2 Championship | (Estonian Soviet Socialist Republic) Madis Laiv | 1975 Soviet Formula 2 Championship |
| Soviet Formula 2 Championship | Teams: (Estonian Soviet Socialist Republic) Kalev Tallinn | 1975 Soviet Formula 2 Championship |
Formula Three
| FIA European Formula 3 Championship | (Australia) Larry Perkins | 1975 FIA European Formula 3 Cup |
| British Formula Three Championship | (Sweden) Gunnar Nilsson | 1975 British Formula Three season |
| German Formula Three Championship | (West Germany) Ernst Maring | 1975 German Formula Three Championship |
| Italian Formula Three Championship | (Italy) Luciano Pavesi | 1975 Italian Formula Three Championship |
| Italian Formula Three Championship | Teams: (Italy) Scuderia Ala d'Oro | 1975 Italian Formula Three Championship |
| Soviet Formula 3 Championship | (Estonian Soviet Socialist Republic) Enn Griffel | 1975 Soviet Formula 3 Championship |
Formula Renault
| French Formula Renault Championship | (France) Christian Debias | 1975 French Formula Renault Championship |
Formula Ford
| Australian Formula Ford Series | (Australia) Paul Bernasconi | 1975 TAA Formula Ford Driver to Europe Series |
| British Formula Ford 2000 Championship | (United Kingdom) Derek Lawrence | |
| Brazilian Formula Ford Championship | (Brazil) Clóvis de Moraes | |
| Danish Formula Ford Championship | (Denmark) John Nielsen | |
| Dutch Formula Ford 1600 Championship | (Netherlands) Jim Vermeulen | |
| German Formula Ford Championship | (Germany) Wolfgang Locher | |
| New Zealand Formula Ford Championship | (New Zealand) Grant Walker | |
| Swedish Formula Ford Championship | (Sweden) Conny Ljungfeldt | |

== Rallying ==
| Series | Driver | Season article |
|---|---|---|
| World Rally Championship | (Italy) Lancia | 1975 World Rally Championship |
| Australian Rally Championship | (Australia) Ross Dunkerton | 1975 Australian Rally Championship |
| Australian Rally Championship | Co-Drivers: (Australia) John Large | 1975 Australian Rally Championship |
| British Rally Championship | (United Kingdom) Roger Clark | 1975 British Rally Championship |
| British Rally Championship | Co-Drivers: (United Kingdom) Jim Porter | 1975 British Rally Championship |
| Canadian Rally Championship | (Canada) Jean-Paul Perusse | 1975 Canadian Rally Championship |
| Canadian Rally Championship | Co-Drivers: (Canada) John Bellefleur | 1975 Canadian Rally Championship |
| Deutsche Rallye Meisterschaft | (Germany) Reiner Altenheimer | |
| Estonian Rally Championship | (Estonian Soviet Socialist Republic) Heiki Ohu | 1975 Estonian Rally Championship |
| Estonian Rally Championship | Co-Drivers: (Estonian Soviet Socialist Republic) Väino Touart | 1975 Estonian Rally Championship |
| European Rally Championship | (Italy) Maurizio Verini | 1975 European Rally Championship |
| European Rally Championship | Co-Drivers: (Italy) Francesco Rossetti | 1975 European Rally Championship |
| Finnish Rally Championship | Group 1: (Finland) Kyösti Hämäläinen | 1975 Finnish Rally Championship |
| Finnish Rally Championship | Group 2: (Finland) Simo Lampinen | 1975 Finnish Rally Championship |
| French Rally Championship | (France) Jacques Henry | |
| Hungarian Rally Championship | (Hungary) Attila Ferjáncz | |
| Hungarian Rally Championship | Co-Drivers: (Hungary) Ferenc Iriczfalvy | |
| Italian Rally Championship | (Italy) Roberto Cambiaghi | |
| Italian Rally Championship | Co-Drivers: (Italy) Emanuele Sanfront | |
| Italian Rally Championship | Manufacturers: (Italy) Fiat | |
| New Zealand Rally Championship | (New Zealand) Rod Millen | 1975 New Zealand Rally Championship |
| Polish Rally Championship | (Poland) Marian Bublewicz | |
| Romanian Rally Championship | (Romania) Laurențiu Borbely | |
| Scottish Rally Championship | (United Kingdom) Charles Samson | |
| Scottish Rally Championship | Co-Drivers: (United Kingdom) Alec Samson | |
| South African National Rally Championship | (South Africa) Sarel van der Merwe | |
| South African National Rally Championship | Co-Drivers: (South Africa) Brian Woodhead | |
| Spanish Rally Championship | (Spain) Antonio Zanini | |
| Spanish Rally Championship | Co-Drivers: (Spain) Víctor Sabater | |

== Sports car and GT ==
| Series | Driver | Season article |
|---|---|---|
| World Sportscar Championship | Class S: (Italy) Alfa Romeo | 1975 World Sportscar Championship |
| World Sportscar Championship | Class GT: (Germany) Porsche | 1975 World Sportscar Championship |
| Australian Sports Car Championship | (Australia) Garrie Cooper | 1975 Australian Sports Car Championship |
| IMSA GT Championship | (United States) Peter Gregg | 1975 IMSA GT Championship |

== Stock car racing ==
| Series | Driver | Season article |
|---|---|---|
| NASCAR Winston Cup Series | (United States) Richard Petty | 1975 NASCAR Winston Cup Series |
| NASCAR Winston Cup Series | Manufacturers: (United States) Dodge | 1975 NASCAR Winston Cup Series |
| NASCAR Winston West Series | (United States) Ray Elder | 1975 NASCAR Winston West Series |
| ARCA Racing Series | (United States) Dave Dayton | 1975 ARCA Racing Series |
| Turismo Carretera | (Argentina) Héctor Gradassi | 1975 Turismo Carretera |
| USAC Stock Car National Championship | (United States) Ramo Stott | 1975 USAC Stock Car National Championship |

== Touring car ==
| Series | Driver | Season article |
|---|---|---|
| European Touring Car Championship | (West Germany) Siegfried Müller Sr. (Belgium) Alain Peltier | 1975 European Touring Car Championship |
| Australian Manufacturers' Championship | (Australia) Holden | 1975 Australian Manufacturers' Championship |
| Australian Touring Car Championship | (Australia) Colin Bond | 1975 Australian Touring Car Championship |
| British Saloon Car Championship | (United Kingdom) Andy Rouse | 1975 British Saloon Car Championship |
| British Saloon Car Championship | Manufacturers: (United States) Chevrolet Camaro; Manufacturers: (United Kingdom) Triumph Dolomite | 1975 British Saloon Car Championship |
| Deutsche Rennsport Meisterschaft | (Germany) Hans Heyer | 1975 Deutsche Rennsport Meisterschaft |

== See also ==
- List of motorsport championships
- Auto racing
