= List of 1974 motorsport champions =

1974 motorsport champions
Previous: 1973	Next: 1975

This list of 1974 motorsport champions is a list of national or international auto racing series with a Championship decided by the points or positions earned by a driver from multiple races.

== Drag racing ==
Series	Champion	Refer
NHRA Drag Racing Series	Top Fuel: (United States) Gary Beck	1973 NHRA Drag Racing Series
NHRA Drag Racing Series	Funny Car: (United States) Shirl Greer	1973 NHRA Drag Racing Series
NHRA Drag Racing Series	Pro Stock: (United States) Bob Glidden	1973 NHRA Drag Racing Series

== Karting ==
Series	Driver	Season article
Karting World Championship	(Italy) Riccardo Patrese	
Karting World Championship	Junior: (Italy) Felice Rovelli	
Karting European Championship	FC: (Netherlands) Aad van Daalen	

== Motorcycle racing ==
Series	Rider	Season article
500cc World Championship	(United Kingdom) Phil Read	1974 Grand Prix motorcycle racing season
350cc World Championship	(Italy) Giacomo Agostini	1974 Grand Prix motorcycle racing season
250cc World Championship	(Italy) Walter Villa	1974 Grand Prix motorcycle racing season
125cc World Championship	(Sweden) Kent Andersson	1974 Grand Prix motorcycle racing season
50cc World Championship	(Netherlands) Henk van Kessel	1974 Grand Prix motorcycle racing season
Formula 750	(Australia) John Dodds	1974 Formula 750 season
Speedway World Championship	(Sweden) Anders Michanek	1974 Individual Speedway World Championship

=== Motocross ===
Series	Rider	Season article
FIM Motocross World Championship	500cc: (Finland) Heikki Mikkola	1974 FIM Motocross World Championship
FIM Motocross World Championship	250cc: (Soviet Union) Gennady Moiseyev	1974 FIM Motocross World Championship
AMA Motocross Championship	500cc: (United States) Jimmy Weinert	1974 AMA Motocross National Championship season
AMA Motocross Championship	250cc: (United States) Gary Jones	1974 AMA Motocross National Championship season
AMA Motocross Championship	125cc: (United States) Marty Smith	1974 AMA Motocross National Championship season
Trans-AMA Motocross Series	(Belgium) Roger De Coster	1974 Trans-AMA motocross series

== Open wheel racing ==
Series	Driver	Season article
Formula One World Championship	(Brazil) Emerson Fittipaldi	1974 Formula One season
Formula One World Championship	Constructors: (United Kingdom) McLaren-Ford	1974 Formula One season
USAC National Championship	(United States) Bobby Unser	1974 USAC Championship Car season
European Formula Two Championship	(France) Patrick Depailler	1974 European Formula Two Championship
Tasman Series	(United Kingdom) Peter Gethin	1974 Tasman Series
Australian Drivers' Championship	(Australia) Max Stewart	1974 Australian Drivers' Championship
Australian Formula 2 Championship	(Australia) Leo Geoghegan	1974 Australian Formula 2 Championship
All-Japan Formula 2000 Championship	(Japan) Noritake Takahara	1974 All-Japan Formula 2000 Championship
European Formula 5000 Championship	(United Kingdom) Bob Evans	1974 Rothmans 5000 European Championship
Formula Atlantic	(Canada) Bill Brack	1974 Formula Atlantic season
Cup of Peace and Friendship	(Czechoslovakia) Karel Jílek	1974 Cup of Peace and Friendship
Cup of Peace and Friendship	Nations: Czechoslovakia	1974 Cup of Peace and Friendship
Formula Nacional	(Spain) Federico van der Hoeven	1974 Formula Nacional
SCCA/USAC Formula 5000 Championship	(United Kingdom) Brian Redman	1974 SCCA/USAC Formula 5000 Championship
SCCA Formula Super Vee	(United States) Elliott Forbes-Robinson	1974 SCCA Formula Super Vee season
South African Formula One Championship	(South Africa) Dave Charlton	1974 South African Formula One Championship
Soviet Formula 2 Championship	(Soviet Union) Vladimir Grekov	1974 Soviet Formula 2 Championship
Soviet Formula 2 Championship	Teams: (Soviet Union) Spartak Krasnodar	1974 Soviet Formula 2 Championship
Formula Three
Lombank Formula 3 Championship (British F3)	(United Kingdom) Brian Henton	1974 British Formula Three season
Forward Trust BARC Formula 3 Championship (British F3)	(United Kingdom) Brian Henton	1974 British Formula Three season
Chilean Formula Three Championship	(Chile) Juan Carlos Silva	1974 Chilean Formula Three Championship
German Formula Three Championship	(Germany) Willi Deutsch	1974 ADAC Preis der Formel 3
Italian Formula Three Championship	(Italy) Alberto Colombo	1974 Italian Formula Three Championship
Italian Formula Three Championship	Teams: (Italy) Scuderia Del Lario	1974 Italian Formula Three Championship
Soviet Formula 3 Championship	(Soviet Union) Wladislav Barkowski	1974 Soviet Formula 3 Championship
Formula Ford
Australian Formula Ford Championship	(Australia) Terry Perkins	1974 TAA Formula Ford Driver to Europe Series
Brazilian Formula Ford Championship	(Brazil) Clóvis de Moraes	
Danish Formula Ford Championship	(Denmark) Henrik Spellerberg	
Dutch Formula Ford 1600 Championship	(Netherlands) Boy Hayje	
German Formula Ford Championship	(United States) William Dawson	
New Zealand Formula Ford Championship	(New Zealand) Peter Hughes	
Swedish Formula Ford Championship	(Sweden) Conny Andersson	

== Rallying ==
Series	Driver/Co-Driver	Season article
World Rally Championship	(Italy) Lancia	1974 World Rally Championship
Australian Rally Championship	(Australia) Colin Bond	1974 Australian Rally Championship
Australian Rally Championship	Co-Drivers: (Australia) George Shepheard	1974 Australian Rally Championship
British Rally Championship	(Republic of Ireland) Billy Coleman	1974 British Rally Championship
British Rally Championship	Co-Drivers: (Republic of Ireland) Dan O'Sullivan	1974 British Rally Championship
Canadian Rally Championship	(Canada) Walter Boyce	1974 Canadian Rally Championship
Canadian Rally Championship	Co-Drivers: (Canada) Doug Woods	1974 Canadian Rally Championship
Deutsche Rallye Meisterschaft	(Sweden) Lars Carlsson	
Estonian Rally Championship	(Estonian Soviet Socialist Republic) Heiki Ohu	1974 Estonian Rally Championship
Estonian Rally Championship	Co-Drivers: (Estonian Soviet Socialist Republic) Väino Touart	1974 Estonian Rally Championship
European Rally Championship	(Germany) Walter Röhrl	1974 European Rally Championship
European Rally Championship	Co-Drivers: (Germany) Jochen Berger	1974 European Rally Championship
Finnish Rally Championship	Group 1: (Finland) Pentti Airikkala	1974 Finnish Rally Championship
Finnish Rally Championship	Group 2: (Finland) Hannu Mikkola	1974 Finnish Rally Championship
French Rally Championship	(France) Jacques Henry	
Hungarian Rally Championship	(Hungary) Mihály Balatoni	
Hungarian Rally Championship	Co-Drivers: (Hungary) István Sándor	
Italian Rally Championship	(Italy) Maurizio Verini	
Italian Rally Championship	Co-Drivers: (Italy) Gino Macaluso	
Italian Rally Championship	Manufacturers: (Italy) Fiat	
Polish Rally Championship	(Poland) Błażej Krupa	
Scottish Rally Championship	(United Kingdom) Arthur Jasper	
Scottish Rally Championship	Co-Drivers: (United Kingdom) Bill Crabb	
South African National Rally Championship	(South Africa) Lambert Fekken	
South African National Rally Championship	Co-Drivers: (South Africa) Johan Borman	
South African National Rally Championship	Manufacturers: (Japan) Datsun	
Spanish Rally Championship	(Spain) Antonio Zanini	
Spanish Rally Championship	Co-Drivers: (Spain) Víctor Sabater	

== Sports car and GT ==
Series	Driver	Season article
World Sportscar Championship	Class S: (France) Matra	1974 World Sportscar Championship
World Sportscar Championship	Class GT: (Germany) Porsche	1974 World Sportscar Championship
Canadian American Challenge Cup	(United Kingdom) Jackie Oliver	1974 Can-Am season
IMSA GT Championship	(United States) Peter Gregg	1974 IMSA GT Championship
Australian Sports Car Championship	(Australia) Henry Mitchell	1974 Australian Sports Car Championship

== Stock car racing ==
Series	Driver	Season article
NASCAR Winston Cup Series	(United States) Richard Petty	1974 NASCAR Winston Cup Series
NASCAR Winston Cup Series	Manufacturers: (United States) Chevrolet	1974 NASCAR Winston Cup Series
NASCAR Winston West Series	(United States) Ray Elder	1974 NASCAR Winston West Series
ARCA Racing Series	(United States) Ron Hutcherson (United States) Dave Dayton	1974 ARCA Racing Series
Turismo Carretera	(Argentina) Héctor Gradassi	1974 Turismo Carretera
USAC Stock Car National Championship	(United States) Butch Hartman	1974 USAC Stock Car National Championship

== Touring car ==
Series	Driver	Season article
European Touring Car Championship	(West Germany) Hans Heyer	1974 European Touring Car Championship
Australian Manufacturers' Championship	(Australia) Holden	1974 Australian Manufacturers' Championship
Australian Touring Car Championship	(Australia) Peter Brock	1974 Australian Touring Car Championship
British Saloon Car Championship	(United Kingdom) Bernard Unett	1974 British Saloon Car Championship
Deutsche Rennsport Meisterschaft	(Germany) Dieter Glemser	1974 Deutsche Rennsport Meisterschaft
South Pacific Touring Series	(Australia) Peter Brock	1974 South Pacific Touring Series

== See also ==
- List of motorsport championships
- Auto racing
