= 1976 Formula 750 season =

1976 Formula 750 Prize

Seasons
- ← 1975 1977 →

The 1976 Formula 750 season was the fourth season of the FIM Formula 750 Prize. The confused results of the Venezuelan round caused the championship's final standings to be shrouded in controversy. Kawasaki's Gary Nixon appeared to have won the second leg of the Venezuelan race however, the race organizers credited Yamaha's Steve Baker with the victory. Víctor Palomo was crowned champion, winning three races on aggregate despite not winning a single heat. If Nixon had been awarded the victory in the Venezuelan round, he would have won the world championship by one point. Nixon protested the Venezuelan results to the FIM, who threw out the results of the event, thus denying his appeal.

== Calendar ==
1976 Calendar
Round	Race title	Circuit	Date	Heat 1 Winner	Heat 2 Winner	Overall winner
1	35th Daytona 200 ^{1}	(United States) Daytona International Speedway	March 7	(Venezuela) Johnny Cecotto		
—	Venezuela 200 Miles ^{2}	(Venezuela) Autodromo Internacional de San Carlos	March 21	(Venezuela) Johnny Cecotto	(United States) Steve Baker	(United States) Steve Baker
2	Imola 200	(Italy) Autodromo Dino Ferrari	April 4	(United States) Steve Baker	(United States) Steve Baker	(United States) Steve Baker
3	Jarama 200 Miles	(Spain) Circuito Permanente del Jarama	May 4–5	(France) Michel Rougerie	(France) Michel Rougerie	(France) Michel Rougerie
4	Nivelles 200 Miles	(Belgium) Complexe Européen de Nivelles-Baulers	May 23	(United States) Gary Nixon	(United Kingdom) Mick Grant	(United States) Gary Nixon
5	Nogaro 200 Miles	(France) Circuit Automobile Paul Armagnac	May 30	(France) Christian Estrosi	(France) Christian Estrosi	(France) Christian Estrosi
6	John Player British Grand Prix	(United Kingdom) Silverstone Grand Prix Circuit	August 14–15	(United States) Steve Baker	(United Kingdom) Mick Grant	(Spain) Víctor Palomo
7	Champion Assen 200 Miles	(Netherlands) Circuit van Drenthe, Assen	September 5	(United Kingdom) Phil Read	(Italy) Giacomo Agostini	(Spain) Víctor Palomo
8	ADAC Preis von Baden-Württemberg und Hessen	(Germany) Hockenheimring	September 26	(United Kingdom) John Newbold	(United States) Gary Nixon	(Spain) Víctor Palomo

Notes:

1. - The Daytona 200 was run as a single race rather than the aggregate of two heats that the other races used.
2. – The Venezuela 200 Miles was given non-championship status following a timekeeping error.

== Championship standings ==
Pos	Rider	Bike	DAY (United States)	IMO (Italy)	JAR (Spain)	NIV (Belgium)	NOG (France)	SIL (United Kingdom)	ASS (Netherlands)	HOC (Germany)	Pts
1	(Spain) Víctor Palomo	Yamaha		13	2		7	1	1	1	61
2	(United States) Gary Nixon	Kawasaki	2			1	4		17	2	47
3	(United Kingdom) John Newbold	Suzuki	35	6		4		4	4	4	37
4	(France) Michel Rougerie	Yamaha	6	2	1						32
5	(United Kingdom) Dave Potter	Yamaha	22			2		3	7		27
6	(France) Gérard Choukroun	Yamaha		8	4		6		16	5	22
7	(France) Christian Estrosi	Yamaha	29				1		6		19
8	(United States) Pat Hennen	Suzuki	3	5							16
=	(France) Patrick Pons	Yamaha	5		3						16
10	(United States) Steve Baker	Yamaha		1							15
=	(Venezuela) Johnny Cecotto	Yamaha	1								15
12	(Japan) Takazumi Katayama	Yamaha		4				7	8		15
13	(Australia) Jack Findlay	Yamaha		10				2			13
14	(Switzerland) Philippe Coulon	Yamaha					2		14		12
=	(Netherlands) Boet van Dulmen	Yamaha	23						2		12
=	(Italy) Giacomo Agostini	Yamaha					3		9		12
=	(South Africa) Kork Ballington	Yamaha						5	5		12
18	(United Kingdom) Barry Sheene	Suzuki	34	3							10
=	(United Kingdom) Mick Grant	Kawasaki				3					10
=	(United Kingdom) Phil Read	Yamaha							3		10
=	(Switzerland) Bruno Kneubuhler	Yamaha		17						3	10
22	(France) Roger Ruiz	Yamaha		9			5				8
=	(United States) Gene Romero	Yamaha	4								8
=	(Brazil) Edmar Ferreira	Yamaha				5		9			8
25	(Spain) Jaime Samaranch	Yamaha			5						6
26	(Netherlands) Marcel Ankoné	Suzuki	31	11		7			10		5
=	(Spain) José María Mallol	Ducati			6						5
=	(Netherlands) Rob Bron	Yamaha	20			6					5
=	(United Kingdom) Chas Mortimer	Yamaha						6			5
=	(United Kingdom) Alex George	Yamaha	14							6	5
31	(Japan) Hideo Kanaya	Yamaha	7								4
=	(Canada) Yvon Duhamel	Kawasaki	36	7							4
=	(United Kingdom) John Williams	Suzuki							13	7	4
34	(United States) Randy Cleek	Yamaha	8								3
=	(Belgium) Philippe Chaltin	Yamaha				8					3
=	(United Kingdom) Barry Ditchburn	Kawasaki					8				3
=	(United Kingdom) Cliff Carr	Yamaha						8			3
=	(Sweden) Johnny Bengtsson	Yamaha	30						18	8	3
39	(France) Christian Huguet	Yamaha					9				2
=	(United States) Kenny Roberts	Yamaha	9								2
=	(South Africa) Jon Ekerold	Yamaha				9				11	2
42	(Australia) John Dodds	Yamaha	10						11	9	1
=	(Belgium) Etienne Geeraerd	Yamaha				10					1
=	(France) Maurice Chaumat	Yamaha					10				1
=	(United Kingdom) Clive Offer	Yamaha						10			1
=	(Germany) Hans-Otto Butenuth	Yamaha							19	10	1
—	(United States) Bob Endicott	Yamaha	11								0
—	(United States) Dennis Purdle	Yamaha	12								0
—	(Australia) Ken Blake	Yamaha	13								0
—	(United States) Walter Foster	Yamaha	15								0
—	(United States) Doug Libby	Yamaha	16								0
—	(Canada) Len Fitch	Yamaha	17								0
—	(United States) Robert Wakefield	Yamaha	18								0
—	(United States) Kevin Stafford	Yamaha	19								0
—	(United States) Ed Hanson	Yamaha	21								0
—	(United States) Dale Singleton	Yamaha	24								0
—	(United States) Ron Mass	Yamaha	25								0
—	(United States) Steve Mallonee	Yamaha	26								0
—	(United States) Richard Chambers	Yamaha	27								0
—	(United States) Cory Rupplet	Yamaha	28								0
—	(United Kingdom) Michael Trimby	Yamaha	32								0
—	(United States) Henry De Gouw	Yamaha	33								0
—	(United States) Bruce Townsend	Yamaha	37								0
—	(United States) Bob Rectenwald	Yamaha	38								0
—	(United States) John Long	Yamaha	39								0
—	(United States) Wes Cooley	Yamaha	40								0
—	(Italy) Alberto Sciaresa	Yamaha		12							0
—	(Finland) Pentti Korhonen	Yamaha		14							0
—	(France) Christian Bourgeois	Yamaha		15							0
—	(France) Gilles Husson	Yamaha		16							0
—	(United Kingdom) Ron Haslam	Yamaha		18							0
—	(United Kingdom) Piers Forrester	Yamaha				11				12	0
—	(United Kingdom) Mick Patrick	Yamaha						11			0
—	(Belgium) Jean-Pierre Orban	Yamaha						12	15		0
—	(Germany) Gerhard Vogt	Yamaha						13			0
—	(United States) Pat Evans	Yamaha						14			0
—	(Netherlands) Dick Alblas	König							12		0
—	(Netherlands) Piet van der Wal	Yamaha							20		0
—	(Germany) E. Brandstetter	Yamaha								13	0
—	(Germany) H. Schone	Yamaha								14	0
Pos	Rider	Bike	DAY (United States)	IMO (Italy)	JAR (Spain)	NIV (Belgium)	NOG (France)	SIL (United Kingdom)	ASS (Netherlands)	HOC (Germany)	Pts

Colour	Result
Gold	Winner
Silver	Second place
Bronze	Third place
Green	Points classification
Blue	Non-points classification
Blue	Non-classified finish (NC)
Purple	Retired, not classified (Ret)
Red	Did not qualify (DNQ)
Red	Did not pre-qualify (DNPQ)
Black	Disqualified (DSQ)
White	Did not start (DNS)
White	Withdrew (WD)
White	Race cancelled (C)
Blank	Did not practice (DNP)
Blank	Did not arrive (DNA)
Blank	Excluded (EX)

== See also ==
- 1976 Grand Prix motorcycle racing season

=== Books ===
- Carter, Chris (ed.). Motocourse 1976-1977. Hazleton Securities Ltd. ISBN 0-905138-02-3.
