= 1977 Formula 750 season =

1977 Formula 750 World Championship

Seasons
- ← 1976 1978 →

The 1977 Formula 750 season was the fifth season of the FIM Formula 750 World Championship and the first season to have full world championship status. Steve Baker was crowned champion, winning five races on aggregate.

== Calendar ==
1977 Calendar
Round	Race title	Circuit	Date	Heat 1 Winner	Heat 2 Winner	Overall winner
1	36th Daytona 200	(United States) Daytona International Speedway	March 13	(United States) Steve Baker	Not run ^{1}	(United States) Steve Baker
2	Imola 200	(Italy) Autodromo Dino Ferrari	April 3	(United States) Kenny Roberts	(United States) Kenny Roberts	(United States) Kenny Roberts
3	32° Premio Internacional de Madrid	(Spain) Circuito Permanente del Jarama	April 24	(United States) Steve Baker		
4	Championnat du Monde 750	(France) Circuit de Dijon-Prenois	June 5	(France) Christian Estrosi	(France) Christian Estrosi	(France) Christian Estrosi
5	FIM 750 World Championship Race	(United Kingdom) Brands Hatch Grand Prix Circuit	July 10	(United States) Steve Baker	(United States) Steve Baker	(United States) Steve Baker
6	Preis von Salzburg	(Austria) Salzburgring	August 21	(United States) Steve Baker	Abandoned ^{2}	(United States) Steve Baker
7	Championnat du Monde 750	(Belgium) Omloop Terlaemen Zolder	August 28	(United States) Steve Baker	(United States) Steve Baker	(United States) Steve Baker
8	Champion Spark Plug Classic	(Netherlands) Circuit van Drenthe	September 4	(United States) Steve Baker	(Italy) Marco Lucchinelli	(Italy) Marco Lucchinelli
9	Champion Spark Plug Classic	(United States) Laguna Seca Raceway	September 11	(United States) Skip Aksland	(United States) Steve Baker	(United States) Skip Aksland
10	World Championship Race	(Canada) Mosport Park	September 18	(Australia) Gregg Hansford	(Australia) Gregg Hansford	(Australia) Gregg Hansford
11	Weltmeisterschaftslauf	(West Germany) Hockenheimring	September 25	(Italy) Giacomo Agostini	(Italy) Giacomo Agostini	(Italy) Giacomo Agostini

Notes:

1. - Heat two of the Daytona 200 was not run due to rain.
2. – Heat two of the Preis von Salzburg was abandoned due to rain.

== Championship standings ==
Pos	Rider	Bike	DAY (United States)	IMO (Italy)	JAR (Spain)	DIJ (France)	BRA (United Kingdom)	SAL (Austria)	ZOL (Belgium)	ASS (Netherlands)	LAG (United States)	MOS (Canada)	HOC (Germany)	Pts
1	(United States) Steve Baker	Yamaha	1	2	1	3	1	1	1	2	2	3		131
2	(France) Christian Sarron	Yamaha	7	4	2			3		3	8	4		55
3	(Italy) Giacomo Agostini	Yamaha		3				2		4			1	45
4	(Italy) Marco Lucchinelli	Yamaha	21			6		4	2	1				40
5	(Japan) Takazumi Katayama	Yamaha	3	6					3				2	37
6	(France) Hubert Rigal	Yamaha		8	3	9	4	5		8		7		36
7	(Australia) Gregg Hansford	Kawasaki	4								3	1		33
8	(Netherlands) Boet van Dulmen	Yamaha	9	5				6	5	5			7	29
9	(United States) Kenny Roberts	Yamaha	2	1										27
10	(Switzerland) Philippe Coulon	Yamaha	15	7	4	2								24
11	(Australia) Warren Willing	Yamaha	6			7	5		10					16
12	(France) Christian Estrosi	Yamaha	14			1								15
=	(United States) Skip Aksland	Yamaha									1			15
=	(France) Patrick Pons	Yamaha					6	7					5	15
15	(United States) Gene Romero	Yamaha	5								4			14
16	(United Kingdom) Ron Haslam	Yamaha	13	13			2							12
=	(Canada) Yvon Duhamel	Kawasaki										2		12
18	(Italy) Armando Toracca	Yamaha		10									3	11
=	(France) Bernard Fau	Yamaha				4		14	8					11
=	(United States) Mike Baldwin	Yamaha	19								6	5		11
=	(Finland) Teuvo Länsivuori	Yamaha				8							4	11
22	(United Kingdom) John Newbold	Yamaha/Suzuki		12			3							10
23	(Venezuela) Johnny Cecotto	Yamaha							4					8
=	(United Kingdom) Alex George	Yamaha			5			12	11	9				8
=	(Spain) Víctor Palomo	Yamaha				14		10	9				6	8
26	(France) Christian Leliard	Yamaha						8	7					7
=	(South Africa) Kork Ballington	Yamaha		9				11		6				7
28	(France) Michel Rougerie	Yamaha	12			5								6
=	(United States) Dave Aldana	Yamaha									5			6
30	(Netherlands) Marcel Ankoné	Yamaha			6									5
=	(France) Gilles Husson	Yamaha			7	10		13		11				5
=	(Belgium) Jean-Philippe Orban	Yamaha	27			12			6					5
=	(Japan) Ikajiro Takai	Yamaha										6		5
34	(France) Jean-Paul Boinet	Yamaha	16				7						15	4
=	(United Kingdom) Piers Forrester	Yamaha	38		8					15			10	4
=	(South Africa) Alan North	Yamaha								7				4
=	(United States) John Long	Yamaha	30								10	8		4
=	(Japan) Sadao Asami	Yamaha									9	9		4
=	(Mexico) Jimmy Morales	Yamaha									7			4
40	(United Kingdom) Julian Soper	Yamaha					8							3
=	(United States) Pat Evans	Yamaha	8											3
=	(Australia) Jack Findlay	Yamaha		11				20					8	3
43	(West Germany) Gerhard Vogt	Yamaha			9	16	12	18		14			13	2
=	(United Kingdom) Clive Offer	Yamaha					9							2
=	(Austria) Max Wiener	Yamaha						9						2
=	(United Kingdom) Neil Tuxworth	Yamaha											9	2
47	(United States) Randy Cleek	Yamaha	10	15										1
=	(United Kingdom) Mike Trimby	Yamaha	39				10							1
=	(Canada) Jim Allen	Yamaha										10		1
=	(Netherlands) Jack Middelburg	Yamaha								10				1
—	(United States) Harry Cone	Yamaha	11											0
—	(United States) Dale Singleton	Yamaha	17											0
—	(Netherlands) Wil Hartog	Suzuki	18											0
—	(United States) James Allen	Yamaha	20											0
—	(United States) Phil McDonald	Yamaha	22											0
—	(Australia) Murray Sayle	Kawasaki	23											0
—	(United States) Mike Kidd	Yamaha	24											0
—	(United States) Bob Rectenwald	Yamaha	25											0
—	(New Zealand) Paul McLachlin	Yamaha	26											0
—	(United States) Tommy Byars	Yamaha	28											0
—	(Italy) Virginio Ferrari	Yamaha	29											0
—	(United States) Bob Wakefield	Yamaha	31											0
—	(Netherlands) Rob Bron	Yamaha	32											0
—	(United States) Doug Libby	Yamaha	33											0
—	(United States) Wes Cooley	Yamaha	34											0
—	(Australia) John Dodds	Yamaha	35											0
—	(West Germany) Harald Merkl	Yamaha	36											0
—	(United States) Larry Bleil	Yamaha	37											0
—	(United States) Bruce Lind	Yamaha	40											0
—	(France) Roger Ruiz	Yamaha		14										0
—	(France) Dominique Pernet	Yamaha				11								0
—	(Finland) Markku Matikainen	Yamaha				13				12				0
—	(France) Hervé Moineau	Yamaha				15			13					0
—	(United Kingdom) Terry Hutton	Yamaha					11	16						0
—	(United Kingdom) Chas Mortimer	Yamaha						15						0
—	(Austria) Karl Zach	Yamaha						17						0
—	(Sweden) Peter Sjoström	Yamaha						19						0
—	(Switzerland) Gérard Melly	Yamaha						21					14	0
—	(Austria) Fritz Kerschbaumer	Yamaha						22						0
—	(Austria) Johann Parzer	Yamaha						23						0
—	(United Kingdom) Dave Potter	Yamaha							12					0
—	(Belgium) Oronzo Memola	Yamaha							14					0
—	(West Germany) Hans-Otto Butenuth	Yamaha								13			12	0
—	(Switzerland) Pascal Mottier	Yamaha											11	0
Pos	Rider	Bike	DAY (United States)	IMO (Italy)	JAR (Spain)	DIJ (France)	BRA (United Kingdom)	SAL (Austria)	ZOL (Belgium)	ASS (Netherlands)	LAG (United States)	MOS (Canada)	HOC (Germany)	Pts

Colour	Result
Gold	Winner
Silver	Second place
Bronze	Third place
Green	Points classification
Blue	Non-points classification
Blue	Non-classified finish (NC)
Purple	Retired, not classified (Ret)
Red	Did not qualify (DNQ)
Red	Did not pre-qualify (DNPQ)
Black	Disqualified (DSQ)
White	Did not start (DNS)
White	Withdrew (WD)
White	Race cancelled (C)
Blank	Did not practice (DNP)
Blank	Did not arrive (DNA)
Blank	Excluded (EX)

== See also ==
- 1977 Grand Prix motorcycle racing season

=== Books ===
- Carter, Chris (ed.). Motocourse 1977-1978. Hazleton Securities Ltd. ISBN 0-905138-04-X.
