= 1974 in motorsport =

The following is an overview of the events of 1974 in motorsport including the major racing events, motorsport venues that were opened and closed during a year, championships and non-championship events that were established and disestablished in a year, and births and deaths of racing drivers and other motorsport people.

== Annual events ==
The calendar includes only annual major non-championship events or annual events that had significance separate from the championship. For the dates of the championship events see related season articles.

Date	Event	Ref
17 February	16th Daytona 500	
26 May	32nd Monaco Grand Prix	
26 May	58th Indianapolis 500	
4–6 June	56th Isle of Man TT	
9 June	58th Targa Florio	
15–16 June	42nd 24 Hours of Le Mans	
27–28 July	26th 24 Hours of Spa	
6 October	15th Hardie-Ferodo 1000	
1 December	21st Macau Grand Prix	

== Births ==
Date	Month	Name	Nationality	Occupation	Note	Ref
15	February	Alexander Wurz	Austrian	Racing driver	24 Hours of Le Mans winner (1996, 2009).	
26	February	Sébastien Loeb	French	Rally driver	World Rally champion (2004-2012).	
27	February	Colin Edwards	American	Motorcycle racer	Superbike World champion (2000, 2002).	
29	March	Marc Gené	Spanish	Racing driver	24 Hours of Le Mans winner (2009).	
5	May	Seiji Ara	Japanese	Racing driver	24 Hours of Le Mans winner (2004).	
13	July	Jarno Trulli	Italian	Racing driver	2004 Monaco Grand Prix winner.	
8	August	Andy Priaulx	British	Racing driver	World Touring Car champion (2005-2007).	
12	September	Guy Smith	British	Racing driver	24 Hours of Le Mans winner (2003).	
18	November	Petter Solberg	Norwegian	Rally driver	World Rally champion (2003). FIA World Rallycross champion (2014-2015).	
31	December	Tony Kanaan	Brazilian	Racing driver	Indianapolis 500 winner (2013).	

== See also ==
- List of 1974 motorsport champions
