= 1978 Formula 750 season =

1978 Formula 750 World Championship

Seasons
- ← 1977 1979 →

The 1978 Formula 750 season was the sixth season of the FIM Formula 750 World Championship and the second season to have full world championship status. Despite Kenny Roberts being the racer with most wins on aggregate, Johnny Cecotto was crowned champion after finishing seven races among the top three.

== Championship standings ==
| Pos | Rider | Bike | IMO (Italy) | PAU (France) | BRA (United Kingdom) | OST (Austria) | JAR (Spain) | HOC (Germany) | NIV (Belgium) | ASS (Netherlands) | LAG (United States) | MOS (Canada) | Pts |
|---|---|---|---|---|---|---|---|---|---|---|---|---|---|
| 1 | (Venezuela) Johnny Cecotto | Yamaha | 1 | 1 | 2 | 2 | 2 | | 1 | 3 | | 5 | 97 |
| 2 | (United States) Kenny Roberts | Yamaha | | 2 | 1 | 1 | 1 | 4 | | | 1 | 2 | 92 |
| 3 | (France) Christian Sarron | Yamaha | 3 | | 5 | 5 | 3 | 1 | 4 | | | | 55 |
| 4 | (Italy) Gianfranco Bonera | Yamaha | | | | 3 | 5 | 2 | 3 | 1 | | | 53 |
| 5 | (France) Patrick Pons | Yamaha | 6 | 5 | 3 | 4 | | 5 | | 6 | | | 40 |
| 6 | (United States) Steve Baker | Yamaha | 2 | 3 | | | 7 | | | | 2 | | 38 |
| 7 | (United States) Mike Baldwin | Yamaha | | | | | | | | | 3 | 1 | 25 |
| 8 | (France) Christian Estrosi | Yamaha | | 6 | | 7 | 4 | | | 4 | | | 25 |
| 9 | (Netherlands) Boet van Dulmen | Yamaha | 7 | 8 | | 10 | 6 | 7 | 6 | | | | 22 |
| 10 | (Monaco) Hubert Rigal | Yamaha | | | 4 | 6 | 8 | | 7 | | | | 20 |
| 11 | (Australia) Gregg Hansford | Kawasaki | 4 | | | | | 3 | | | | | 18 |
| 12 | (France) Hervé Moineau | Yamaha | | | | | | 10 | 2 | | | | 13 |
| 13 | (Japan) Takazumi Katayama | Yamaha | | | | | | | | 2 | | | 12 |
| 14 | (Japan) Sadao Asami | Yamaha | 5 | 7 | | | | | | 9 | | | 12 |
| 15 | (Canada) Yvon Duhamel | Kawasaki | | | | | | | | | | 3 | 10 |
| 16 | (Switzerland) Michel Frutschi | Yamaha | | | | | | | 5 | 8 | | | 9 |
| 17 | (Japan) Ikujirō Takaī | Yamaha | | 4 | | | | | | | | | 8 |
| = | (United States) Gene Romero | Yamaha | | | | | | | | | 4 | | 8 |
| = | (United States) Skip Aksland | Yamaha | | | | | | | | | | 4 | 8 |
| 20 | (United Kingdom) Dave Potter | Yamaha | | | 10 | | | | | 5 | | | 7 |
| 21 | (Australia) Warren Willing | Yamaha | 8 | | 7 | | | | | | | | 7 |
| 22 | (United States) Wes Cooley | Yamaha | | | | | | | | | 5 | | 6 |
| 23 | (Australia) Jeffrey Sayle | Yamaha | | | 6 | | | | 10 | | | | 6 |
| 24 | (United States) John Long | Yamaha | | | | | | | | | 10 | 6 | 6 |
| 25 | (Australia) Greg Johnson | Yamaha | | | | 8 | | 8 | | | | | 6 |
| 26 | (France) Jean-François Baldé | Yamaha | | | | | | 6 | | | | | 5 |
| = | (United States) Dave Aldana | Yamaha | | | | | | | | | 6 | | 5 |
| 28 | (Finland) Markku Matikainen | Yamaha | | | 9 | | | | 8 | | | | 5 |
| 29 | (United Kingdom) Steve Parrish | Yamaha | | | | | | | | 7 | | | 4 |
| = | (United States) Randy Mamola | Yamaha | | | | | | | | | 7 | | 4 |
| = | (Canada) Steve Gervais | Yamaha | | | | | | | | | | 7 | 4 |
| 32 | (France) Bernard Fau | Kawasaki | 9 | 9 | | | | | | | | | 4 |
| = | (France) Jean-Paul Boinet | Yamaha | | | | 9 | 9 | | | | | | 4 |
| 34 | (United Kingdom) John Newbold | Yamaha | | | 8 | | | | | | | | 3 |
| = | (United States) Steve McLaughlin | Yamaha | | | | | | | | | 8 | | 3 |
| = | (Canada) Gary Collins | Yamaha | | | | | | | | | | 8 | 3 |
| 37 | (Netherlands) Jack Middelburg | Yamaha | | | | | | 9 | | | | | 2 |
| = | (Switzerland) Philippe Coulon | Yamaha | | | | | | | 9 | | | | 2 |
| = | (United States) Ron Pierce | Yamaha | | | | | | | | | 9 | | 2 |
| = | (United States) John Clark | Yamaha | | | | | | | | | | 9 | 2 |
| 41 | (United States) Dale Singleton | Yamaha | 10 | | | | | | | | | | 1 |
| = | (France) Michel Rougerie | Yamaha | | 10 | | | | | | | | | 1 |
| = | (Spain) Víctor Palomo | Yamaha | | | | | 10 | | | | | | 1 |
| = | (United Kingdom) Barry Ditchburn | Yamaha | | | | | | | | 10 | | | 1 |
| = | (Canada) Martin Hall | Yamaha | | | | | | | | | | 10 | 1 |
| Pos | Rider | Bike | IMO (Italy) | PAU (France) | BRA (United Kingdom) | OST (Austria) | JAR (Spain) | HOC (Germany) | NIV (Belgium) | ASS (Netherlands) | LAG (United States) | MOS (Canada) | Pts |

| Colour | Result |
|---|---|
| Gold | Winner |
| Silver | Second place |
| Bronze | Third place |
| Green | Points classification |
| Blue | Non-points classification |
| Blue | Non-classified finish (NC) |
| Purple | Retired, not classified (Ret) |
| Red | Did not qualify (DNQ) |
| Red | Did not pre-qualify (DNPQ) |
| Black | Disqualified (DSQ) |
| White | Did not start (DNS) |
| White | Withdrew (WD) |
| White | Race cancelled (C) |
| Blank | Did not practice (DNP) |
| Blank | Did not arrive (DNA) |
| Blank | Excluded (EX) |

== See also ==
- 1978 Grand Prix motorcycle racing season
