= 1974 Formula 750 season =

1974 Formula 750 Prize

Seasons
- ← 1973 1975 →

The 1974 Formula 750 season was the second season of the FIM Formula 750 Prize. The series was originally planned for seven events, but when it was realised that the Yamaha TZ750 hadn't yet been homologized by the FIM and wouldn't be eligible to compete, several of the race organisers changed their races from F750 to open class to allow the Yamaha to compete. Only 3 events remained on the calendar for the Formula 750 Prize. The series was won by Australian John Dodds.

== Calendar ==
1974 Calendar
Round	Race	Circuit	Date	Winner	Second	Third
1	Spain	Jarama	May 26	(Australia) John Dodds	(Australia) Jack Findlay	(Spain) Víctor Palomo
2	Finland	Hämeenlinna	July 31	(Finland) Pentti Korhonen	(France) Patrick Pons	(Finland) Pentti Salonen
3	(United Kingdom) John Player International Grand Prix	Silverstone	August 11	(United Kingdom) Paul Smart	(Canada) Yvon Duhamel	(France) Patrick Pons

== Championship standings ==
Pos	Rider	Bike	JAR (Spain)	HAM (Finland)	SIL (United Kingdom)	Points
1	(Australia) John Dodds	Yamaha TZ 350	1	5	5	27
2	(France) Patrick Pons	Yamaha TZ 350	-	2	3	22
3	(Australia) Jack Findlay	Suzuki TR750	2	-	7	16
4	(Finland) Pentti Korhonen	Yamaha TZ 350	-	1	-	15
=	(United Kingdom) Paul Smart	Suzuki TR 750	-	-	1	15
6	(Canada) Yvon Duhamel	Kawasaki H2R	-	-	2	12
7	(Spain) Víctor Palomo	Ducati 750SS	3	-	-	10
=	(Finland) Pentti Salonen	Yamaha TZ 350	-	3	-	10
9	(Switzerland) Hans Mühlebach	Yamaha TZ 350	4	-	-	8
=	(Finland) Pekka Nurmi	Yamaha TZ 350	-	4	-	8
=	(United Kingdom) Stan Woods	Suzuki TR 750	-	-	4	8
12	(Belgium) Jean-Philippe Orban	Yamaha TZ 350	5	-	-	6
13	(Italy) Guido Mandracci	Suzuki TR 750	6	-	-	5
=	(Finland) Eero Hyvärinen	Yamaha TZ 350	-	6	-	5
=	(United Kingdom) Tony Rutter	Kawasaki H2R	-	-	6	5
16	(Spain) José Maria Palomo	Norton Commando	7	-	-	4
=	(United Kingdom) Billie Nelson	Yamaha TZ 350	-	7	-	4
18	(Norway) Kjell Solberg	Yamaha TZ 350	-	8	-	3
=	(United Kingdom) John Williams	Yamaha TZ 350	-	-	8	3
20	(Sweden) Ingemar Larsson	Yamaha TZ 350	-	9	-	2
=	(United Kingdom) Steve Manship	Yamaha TZ 350	-	-	9	2
22	(Northern Ireland) Tom Herron	Yamaha TZ 350	-	10	-	1
=	(Germany) Dieter Braun	Yamaha TZ 350	-	-	10	1
Pos	Rider	Bike	JAR (Spain)	HAM (Finland)	SIL (United Kingdom)	Points

Colour	Result
Gold	Winner
Silver	Second place
Bronze	Third place
Green	Points classification
Blue	Non-points classification
Blue	Non-classified finish (NC)
Purple	Retired, not classified (Ret)
Red	Did not qualify (DNQ)
Red	Did not pre-qualify (DNPQ)
Black	Disqualified (DSQ)
White	Did not start (DNS)
White	Withdrew (WD)
White	Race cancelled (C)
Blank	Did not practice (DNP)
Blank	Did not arrive (DNA)
Blank	Excluded (EX)

== See also ==
- 1974 Grand Prix motorcycle racing season
