= 1973 Gwyn Staley 400 =

Auto race held at North Wilkesboro Speedway in 1973

Race details
- Race 7 of 28 in the 1973 NASCAR Winston Cup Series
- North Wilkesboro Speedway
- Date: April 8, 1973
- Official name: Gwyn Staley 400
- Location: North Wilkesboro Speedway, North Wilkesboro, North Carolina
- Course length: 1.005 km (0.625 miles)
- Distance: 400 laps, 250 mi (402 km)
- Weather: Cold with temperatures of 59 °F (15 °C); wind speeds of 14 miles per hour (23 km/h)
- Average speed: 97.224 miles per hour (156.467 km/h)
- Attendance: 16,000

Pole position
Driver	Bobby Allison	Bobby Allison Motorsports

Most laps led
Driver	Richard Petty	Petty Enterprises
- Laps: 387

Winner
No. 43	Richard Petty	Petty Enterprises

The 1973 Gwyn Staley 400 was a NASCAR NASCAR Cup Series racing event that took place at North Wilkesboro Speedway on April 8, 1973, in North Wilkesboro, North Carolina.

== Background ==
Three drivers entered the 1970 Wilkes 400 in a very close points race. Bobby Isaac was just ahead of James Hylton, and Bobby Allison was close behind. But Richard Petty, who was out of the points because of a shoulder injury suffered at Darlington in May, was considered the favorite to win the race. Isaac started from the pole for a record-tying fourth consecutive time, matching Fred Lorenzen and Herb Thomas with a qualifying lap time of 21.346 seconds / 105.406 mph. Fans were given quite a show as Isaac and Petty exchanged the lead a total of 11 times throughout the race. Isaac, in the Nord Krauskopf's K&K Insurance Dodge, led 179 laps and took the win by six car lengths over Petty. Petty, who had started the race in third position led the most laps in the race with 216. Bobby Allison started fourth and finished fourth behind his brother, Donnie Allison. And Hylton finished fifth at the end of day. Isaac advanced to become the 1970 Winston Cup Champion at season's end, with Allison being the runner-up in points.

Bad weather in 1971 caused the Wilkes 400 to be postponed to November 21. Due to the Grand National Series' struggling car counts, cars from NASCAR's Grand American Series were allowed to run in this race. Charlie Glotzbach broke the track record in qualifying at 20.919 seconds / 107.558 mph. It was the first lap ever run under 21 seconds at North Wilkesboro, ending Bobby Isaac's run of five consecutive poles at the track. Tiny Lund, driving a 1970 Camaro, qualified sixth and led just seven laps on his way to the victory. Lund also won another race driving the Camaro that season at Hickory. Glotzbach finished second, six seconds behind Lund, after leading 76 laps in the race. Richard Petty started from the outside pole and led 306 laps to finish third. Dave Marcis finished fourth, two laps down, and Benny Parsons rounded out the top five. Bobby Allison was the only other driver to lead, running 11 laps out front before losing an engine prior to the half.

The Wilkes 400 in 1972 was one of the wildest finishes in NASCAR Cup Series history. Buddy Baker won the pole in the No. 71 K&K Insurance Dodge owned by Nord Krauskopf, but he only led the first lap of the race. Richard Petty and Bobby Allison swapped the lead for the rest of the race, beating and banging each other for the win. At times was more of a demolition derby than a race. Both cars were destroyed by the end, with Allison's car noticeably smoking. This was the peak of the Petty-Allison rivalry. Petty was declared the winner, but in Victory Lane, a fan tried to attack him. But he was defended by his helmet-wielding brother, Maurice Petty. This was Richard Petty's last of 137 wins in a Plymouth.

== Race report ==
Sixteen thousand people watched Richard Petty defeat Benny Parsons by at least four laps; resulting in his 151st NASCAR Winston Cup Series win.

Due to haphazard adjustments to the vehicles' setup prior to qualifying, Junior Johnson failed to qualify at his home track and Cale Yarborough struggled the whole distance of the race; finishing in an unusually low sixth place.

A little known fact about this race was that Benny Parsons was the president of a Parent-Teacher Association (based out of an Ellerbe, North Carolina, elementary school) and a NASCAR champion at the same time. Out of the drivers in the 30-car grid, 28 of them were American-born while two were Canadian (Vic Parsons and Yvon Duhamel - a French Canadian from Quebec who finished 10th in his only NASCAR start of any form).

Rick Newsom would end up being the last-place finisher with an engine problem on lap 2. Cecil Gordon was on the lead lap late in the race until a flat tire on a restart cost him a top 3 finish.

Notable crew chiefs who actively participated in the race were Tim Brewer, Travis Carter, Harry Hyde, Dale Inman, Vic Ballard, Lee Gordon and Bud Moore.

=== Qualifying ===
Grid	No.	Driver	Manufacturer
1	12	Bobby Allison	'73 Chevrolet
2	43	Richard Petty	'73 Dodge
3	59	Donnie Allison	'72 Chevrolet
4	15	Bobby Isaac	'72 Ford
5	24	Cecil Gordon	'72 Chevrolet
6	72	Benny Parsons	'72 Chevrolet
7	71	Buddy Baker	'72 Dodge
8	2	Dave Marcis	'71 Dodge
9	11	Cale Yarborough	'73 Chevrolet
10	54	Lennie Pond	'73 Chevrolet
11	70	J.D. McDuffie	'72 Chevrolet
12	7	Dean Dalton	'71 Mercury
13	67	Buddy Arrington	'72 Dodge
14	79	Frank Warren	'73 Dodge
15	90	Yvon DuHamel	'72 Ford
16	25	Jabe Thomas	'73 Dodge
17	47	Raymond Williams	'72 Ford
18	10	Bill Champion	'71 Ford
19	20	Rick Newsom	'71 Ford
20	06	Neil Castles	'73 Dodge
21	96	Richard Childress	'72 Chevrolet
22	30	Walter Ballard	'71 Mercury
23	4	John Sears	'71 Dodge
24	48	James Hylton	'71 Mercury
25	8	Ed Negre	'71 Mercury
26	64	Elmo Langley	'72 Ford
27	45	Vic Parsons	'71 Ford
28	19	Henley Gray	'71 Mercury
29	77	Charlie Roberts	'71 Ford
30	26	Earl Brooks	'71 Ford

=== Finishing order ===
Section reference:

1. Richard Petty (No. 43)
2. Benny Parsons (No. 72)
3. Buddy Baker (No. 71)
4. Bobby Allison (No. 12)
5. Cecil Gordon (No. 24)
6. Cale Yarborough (No. 11)
7. Lennie Pond (No. 54)
8. James Hylton (No. 48)
9. Donnie Allison* (No. 59)
10. Yvon Duhamel (No. 90)
11. John Sears (No. 4)
12. Vic Parsons (No. 45)
13. Elmo Langley (No. 64)
14. Bill Champion (No. 20)
15. Earl Brooks (No. 26)
16. Richard Childress (No. 96)
17. Dean Dalton (No. 7)
18. Walter Ballard (No. 30)
19. Ed Negre (No. 8)
20. Dave Marcis (No. 2)
21. Frank Warren (No. 79)
22. Neil Castles* (No. 06)
23. J.D. McDuffie* (No. 70)
24. Henley Gray* (No. 19)
25. Buddy Arrington* (No. 67)
26. Raymond Williams* (No. 47)
27. Charlie Roberts* (No. 44)
28. Bobby Isaac* (No. 15)
29. Jabe Thomas* (No. 25)
30. Rick Newsom* (No. 20)

* Driver failed to finish race

== Timeline ==
Section reference:

- Start of race: Richard Petty started the race with the pole position.
- Lap 2: Rick Newsom blew his engine, becoming the race's last-place finisher.
- Lap 4: Bobby Allison takes over the lead from Richard Petty.
- Lap 11: Richard Petty takes over the lead from Bobby Allison.
- Lap 85: Benny Parsons takes over the lead from Richard Petty.
- Lap 91: Richard Petty takes over the lead from Benny Parsons.
- Lap 96: Jabe Thomas developed problems with his vehicle's axle.
- Lap 158: Bobby Isaac blew his engine, resulting in him getting a DNF for his efforts.
- Lap 165: Fuel pump problems forced Charlie Roberts off the track for the remainder of the race.
- Lap 166: Raymond Williams' brakes stopped working.
- Lap 202: Buddy Arrington lost the rear end of his vehicle; ending his day on the track with a meager 25th-place finish.
- Lap 211: Henley Gray's engine stopped working on this lap.
- Lap 215: J.D. McDuffie was involved in a terminal crash, causing him to acquire a 23rd-place finish.
- Lap 253: Neil Castles noticed that his ignition stopped working, forcing him to accept a humbling 22nd-place finish.
- Lap 383: Donnie Allison managed to blow an engine, forcing him to leave the race.
- Finish: Richard Petty was officially declared the winner of the event.

Preceded by 1973 Atlanta 500	NASCAR Winston Cup Series Season; 1973	Succeeded by 1973 Rebel 500

Preceded by 1973 Richmond 500	Richard Petty's Career Wins; 1960-1984	Succeeded by 1973 Alamo 500
