= Pat Evans (motorcyclist) =

American motorcycle racer (1955–1977)

- Born: Patrick Michael Evans; April 28, 1955; El Cajon, California, US
- Died: April 6, 1977 (aged 21); Bologna, Italy
Motorcycle racing career statistics
250cc World Championship
Active years	1976-1977
Manufacturers	Yamaha
Starts / Wins / Podiums / Poles / F. laps / Points; 3 / / / / / 3

Patrick Michael "Pat" Evans (El Cajon, California, April 28, 1955 – Bologna, April 6, 1977) was an American motorcycle racer. Following a serious accident on April 3, 1977, at the Imola 200, he remained in a coma and died three days later in Bologna hospital at the age of 21. He made his debut in the world championship in 1976.

== Career ==
Evans finished 59th on a Yamaha TZ700 in the 1974 Daytona 200.

=== 1976 Season ===
In 1976 Evans made his debut in the world championship. The first race he took part in was the French Grand Prix, racing the Bugatti Circuit in the 250 class. Evans qualified second but on the day of the race he was accused by Eric Offenstadt and Bernard Fau of racing with a 350 cc machine. The two French riders tried to chase him off the grid. Evans had only used a 350 during Friday practice, whilst waiting for the arrival of the 250, to familiarise himself with the circuit. He had told other rider, who raised no objections, but had failed to notify the stewards. As there was no evidence that he had used a 350 during Saturday's qualifying, the stewards gave the green light for him to race. Evans retired on lap 5 due to a mechanical problem. At the Bol d'Or he dominated for the first three quarters of an hour setting the lap record, but due to mechanical problems with the Yamaha TZ700 was forced to retire. At the 400 miles of Thruxton he was co-rider with Jean-Claude Chemarin, replacing the injured Christian Leon. On a works Honda 941, Chemarin/Evans finished second, just one minute behind Christian Huguet and Roger Ruiz, also on a factory Honda.

=== 1977 Season ===
In 1977, Evans was going to take part in the Transatlantic Trophy and the 1977 Formula 750 season. At the Daytona 200. he started in 13th position and immediately took command of the race but, probably due to excessive enthusiasm, he lost control of the bike and crashed at the fourth corner, eventually finishing in eighth position.

==== Fatal accident ====
On April 3, 1977, at the Imola 200, Evans was in third position when, due to an engine seizure at the Tamburello curve, he was thrown from his bike and, rolling for about fifty meters, hit the straw bales that served as protection at the edge of the circuit. According to the journalist Giancarlo Cevenini, if Evans had worn a fiberglass helmet he would have been saved, as the impact was excessively violent. Evans, however, due to the sponsor, had to race with an ABS helmet. Evans was unconscious and was taken to Bologna Hospital, where he died on April 6.

Another American rider who took part in the Imola 200 and a contemporary of Evans, Randy Cleek, was killed in a road accident returning from the race.
