= 1973 Richmond 500 =

Auto race held at Richmond Fairgrounds Raceway in 1973

Race details
- Race 3 of 28 in the 1973 NASCAR Winston Cup Series
- Layout of Richmond Speedway
- Date: February 25, 1973
- Official name: Richmond 500
- Location: Richmond Fairgrounds Raceway, Richmond, Virginia
- Course length: 0.872 km (0.542 miles)
- Distance: 500 laps, 271 mi (436 km)
- Weather: Temperatures of 57.9 °F (14.4 °C); wind speeds of 9.9 miles per hour (15.9 km/h)
- Average speed: 74.764 miles per hour (120.321 km/h)
- Attendance: 18,000

Pole position
Driver	Bobby Allison	Bobby Allison Motorsports
- Time: 21.453 seconds

Most laps led
Driver	Richard Petty	Petty Enterprises
- Laps: 227

Winner
No. 43	Richard Petty	Petty Enterprises

The 1973 Richmond 500 was a NASCAR Winston Cup Series racing event that took place on February 25, 1973, at Richmond Fairgrounds Raceway (now Richmond Raceway) in Richmond, Virginia.

== Background ==
In 1953, Richmond International Raceway began hosting the Grand National Series with Lee Petty winning that first race in Richmond. The original track was paved in 1968. In 1988, the track was re-designed into its present D-shaped configuration

The name for the raceway complex was "Strawberry Hill" until the Virginia State Fairgrounds site was bought out in 1999 and renamed the "Richmond International Raceway".

== Race report ==
Five hundred laps took place on a paved oval track spanning .542 miles (0.872 km) for a grand total of 271.0 miles (436.1 km).It took three hours and thirty-seven minutes for the race to conclude in front of eighteen thousand spectators.

Notable crew chiefs that were a part of the race included Herb Nab, Bud Moore, Lee Gordon, Vic Ballard, Dale Inman and Harry Hyde. Richard Petty defeated Buddy Baker by 13.6 seconds, bringing about Petty's 150th NASCAR Cup Series career win.

Eight cautions for seventy-eight laps slowed the race. The other drivers in the top ten were: Cale Yarborough, Bobby Isaac, Dave Marcis, Bill Dennis, Lennie Pond, Cecil Gordon, James Hylton, and Benny Parsons. Though Lennie Pond made his debut four years prior, this was only his third career start, and it yielded his first top-10. Notable speeds were: 74.764 miles per hour (120.321 km/h) as the average speed and 90.952 miles per hour (146.373 km/h) as the pole position speed.

Canadian driver Vic Parsons started in 27th place and ended the race in 30th place (out of 30 drivers). J.D. McDuffie would ruin his vehicle's engine on lap 54 while David Sisco would do the same thing on lap 110. Engine problems would also claim the vehicles of Dean Dalton on lap 126, Ray Hendrick on lap 151 and Donnie Allison on lap 162. Neil Castles' vehicle would suffer from terminal damage due to a crash on lap 210 while Tiny Lund would lose his vehicle's rear end on lap 229. Frank Warren's vehicles ran out of tires on lap 237 while a crash would cause terminal damage to Sonny Hutchins' vehicle on lap 254. Richard D. Howard would acquire the final DNF of the race due to engine problems on lap 349.

Total winnings for this race were $35,600 ($252,162 when considering inflation). DiGard Motorsports would throw their collective hats into what would become their debut race as a NASCAR Cup Series team.

=== Qualifying ===
Grid	No.	Driver	Manufacturer	Owner
1	12	Bobby Allison	'73 Chevrolet	Bobby Allison
2	72	Benny Parsons	'72 Chevrolet	L.G. DeWitt
3	59	Donnie Allison	'72 Chevrolet	DiGard
4	24	Cecil Gordon	'72 Chevrolet	Cecil Gordon
5	71	Buddy Baker	'71 Dodge	Nord Krauskopf
6	11	Cale Yarborough	'73 Chevrolet	Richard Howard
7	90	Ray Hendrick	'71 Mercury	Junie Donlavey
8	43	Richard Petty	'73 Dodge	Petty Enterprises
9	17	Bill Dennis	'72 Chevrolet	H.J. Brooking
10	15	Bobby Isaac	'72 Ford	Bud Moore

== Finishing order ==
Section reference:

1. Richard Petty (No. 43)
2. Buddy Baker† (No. 71)
3. Cale Yarborough† (No. 11)
4. Bobby Isaac† (No. 15)
5. Dave Marcis (No. 2)
6. Bill Dennis (No. 17)
7. Lennie Pond (No. 54)
8. Cecil Gordon† (No. 24)
9. James Hylton† (No. 48)
10. Benny Parsons† (No. 72)
11. Walter Ballard† (No. 30)
12. Elmo Langley† (No. 64)
13. Jabe Thomas† (No. 25)
14. Bill Champion† (No. 10)
15. Bobby Allison† (No. 12)
16. Henley Gray (No. 19)
17. Buddy Arrington† (No. 67)
18. Charlie Roberts (No. 77)
19. John Sears† (No. 4)
20. Richard D. Brown* (No. 51)
21. Sonny Hutchins*† (No. 82)
22. Frank Warren*† (No. 79)
23. Tiny Lund*† (No. 55)
24. Neil Castles*† (No. 06)
25. Donnie Allison* (No. 59)
26. Ray Hendrick*† (No. 90)
27. Dean Dalton* (No. 7)
28. David Sisco*† (No. 05)
29. J.D. McDuffie*† (No. 70)
30. Vic Parsons* (No. 45)

* Driver failed to finish race
† signifies that the driver is known to be deceased

Preceded by 1973 Daytona 500	Richard Petty's Career Wins; 1960-1984	Succeeded by 1973 Gwyn Staley 400
