= Trevor Deeley =

Canadian motorcycle racer

Trevor Deeley (March 15, 1920 – March 28, 2002) was a Canadian Motorcycle Racer and Yamaha distributor. He was inducted into the Canadian Motorsport Hall of Fame in 1995.

== Family background ==
Deeley's family was in the motorcycle business for a long time. His grandfather (Mr Fred Deeley Sr.) started the first Harley-Davidson dealership in Canada in 1917. After 1925, his father took over this business, and later on, Trevor joined him. This laid the foundation of his career in both as a motorcycle racer and distributor.

== Racing career ==
Deeley started his career as a mechanic and later joined his family business. Parallelly, from the 1940s to the 1950s, he started participating in motorcycle racing on dirt tracks, flat tracks across western Canada and northwestern United States with Racing number #22.

In 1946, Deeley won the Alberta championship, the Montana state title and a big race at Tacoma. Because of his skills, willpower, and determination, Deeley earned a reputation as a formidable competitor.

Deeleys himself used to maintain his bike, transport it to events and handle all mechanical work without any support. His experience as both a rider and a mechanic enhanced his understanding of motorcycle performance, which later reflected in the motorcycle business.

== Business career ==
During the 1940s and 1950s, Deeley dominated flat track motorcycle racing. He became a factory-sponsored motorcycle rider for Harley-Davidson with racing number #22.

In 1953, Deeley became General Manager of Fred Deeley Imports Ltd. (his family business)

In 1957, Deeley authorised the import-dealership of Honda motorcycles in Canada. and later started Yamaha motorcycles distribution as well.

In 1973, Harley-Davidson Motor Company approached Deeley to become the exclusive distributor partner of Canada. That time, he cancelled all the deals with Japanese companies and focused only on the distribution of Harley-Davidson motorcycles on a broad scale.

In 1985, Deeley joined the board of directors of Harley-Davidson Motor Company and retired in 1993. He was the first non-American there.
