= Heiki Ohu =

Estonian rally driver (1943–2021)

Personal information
- Nationality: (Estonia) Estonian
- Born: 23 June 1943; Ravila, Estonia
- Died: 28 December 2021 (aged 78); Tallinn, Estonia

World Rally Championship record
- Years active: 1973
- Co-driver: (Estonia) Toomas Diener
- Teams: Avtoexport
- Rallies: 16
- Championships: 0
- Rally wins: 0
- Podiums: 0
- Stage wins: 0
- Total points: 0
- First rally: 1979 Acropolis Rally
- Last rally: 1983 RAC Rally

Heiki Ohu (23 June 1943 – 28 December 2021) was an Estonian rally driver. He started rallying in 1970 under the guidance of Väino Touart. Heiki participated in European Rally Championship and in the World Rally Championship.

Heiki Ohu achieved good results competing in WRC rallies in his own class. In 1982 he finished in second place in Rally Finland in his own class. Also third places from 1981 in Acropolis Rally and Rally RAC in 2/8 and 2/5 classes. He died on 28 December 2021.

== Results ==
=== Complete WRC results ===
Year	Entrant	Car	1	2	3	4	5	6	7	8	9	10	11	12	WDC	Points
1979	Heiki Ohu	Lada 1600	MON	SWE	POR	KEN	GRE; 14	NZL	FIN; 43	CAN	ITA	FRA			N/A	N/A
1979	Heiki Ohu	Lada 1300 Rallye											GBR; Ret	CIV	N/A	N/A
1980	Heiki Ohu	Lada 1600	MON	SWE; 45	POR	KEN									N/A	N/A
1980	Avtoexport	Lada VAZ 21011					GRE; Ret	ARG	FIN	NZL	ITA	FRA	GBR	CIV	N/A	N/A
1981	Heiki Ohu	Lada 1300 Rallye	MON	SWE; 42	POR	KEN	FRA								N/A	N/A
1981	Heiki Ohu	Lada VAZ 21011									FIN; Ret	ITA	CIV		N/A	N/A
1981	Avtoexport	Lada 1600						GRE; 15	ARG	BRA				GBR; 26	N/A	N/A
1982	Avtoexport	Lada VAZ 21011	MON	SWE	POR	KEN	FRA	GRE; Ret	NZL	BRA	FIN				N/A	N/A
1982	Heiki Ohu	Lada VAZ 21011									FIN; Ret	ITA	CIV		N/A	N/A
1982	V/O Autosport	Lada VAZ 2105 VFTS												GBR; 37	N/A	N/A
1983	Heiki Ohu	Lada 2101	MON	SWE; 53	POR	KEN	FRA				FIN; 52	ITA	CIV		N/A	N/A
1983	Avtoexport	Lada VAZ 2105 VFTS						GRE; Ret	NZL	ARG					N/A	N/A
1983	Autoexport Moskva	Lada VAZ 2105 VFTS												GBR; 28	N/A	N/A
