= Steve Baker (motorcyclist) =

American motorcycle racer

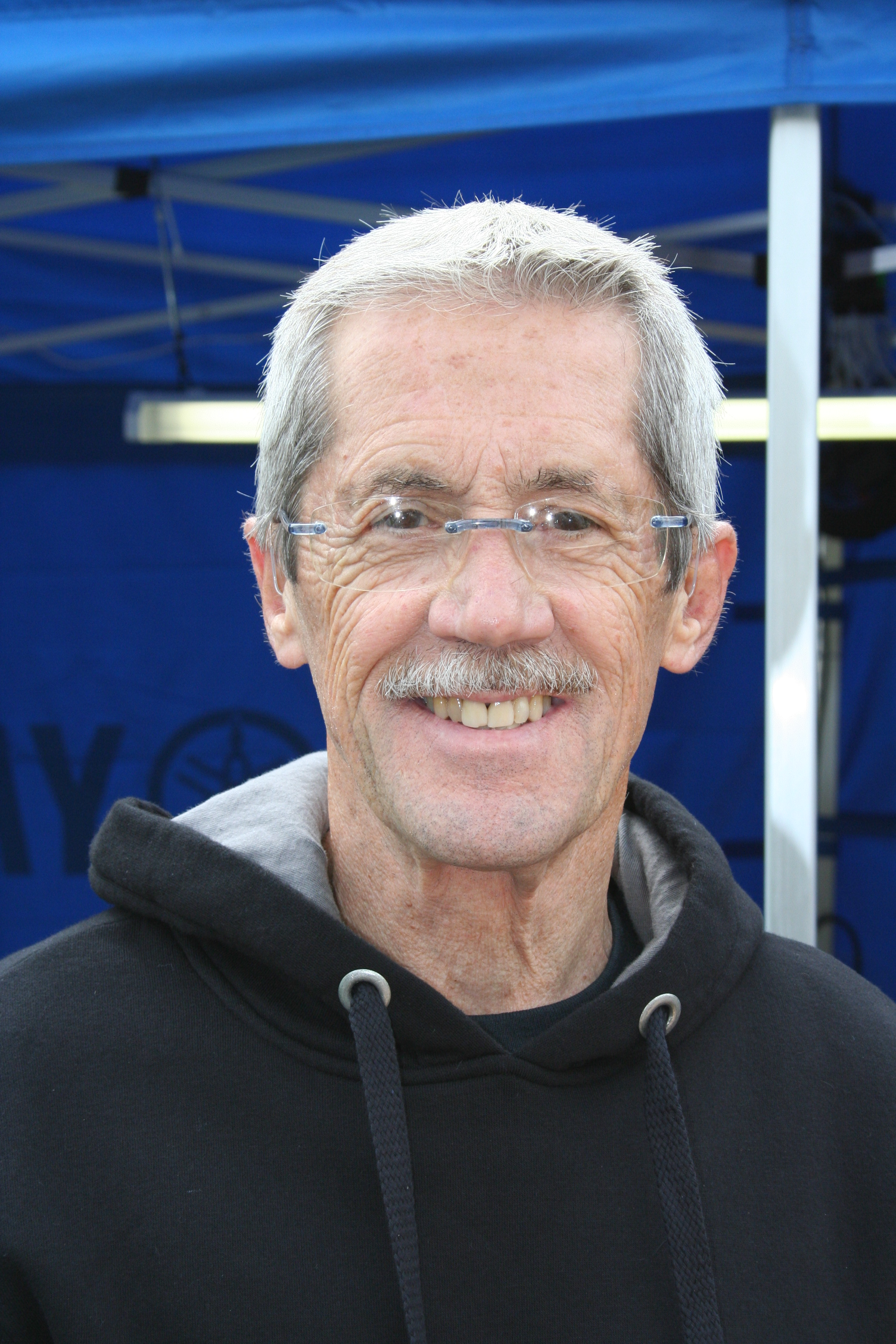
- Steve Baker (2016)
- Nationality: American
- Born: September 5, 1952 (age 74); Bellingham, Washington
Motorcycle racing career statistics
Grand Prix motorcycle racing
Active years	1977 - 1978
First race	1977 500cc Venezuelan Grand Prix
Last race	1978 500cc West German Grand Prix
Team(s)	Yamaha, Suzuki
Championships	Formula 750 - 1977
Starts / Wins / Podiums / Poles / F. laps / Points; 15 / 0 / 7 / 1 / 0 / 122

Steve Baker (born September 5, 1952) is an American former professional motorcycle racer. He competed in AMA dirt track and road racing competitions from 1973 to 1976 and in the FIM Grand Prix motorcycle racing world championships in 1977 and 1978. Baker is notable for being the first American competitor to win a road racing world championship when he won the 1977 Formula 750 title.

Bespectacled and soft-spoken, the diminutive Baker had an unassuming demeanor that was the antithesis of a stereotypical motorcycle racer. Standing only 5 ft 6 in (1.68 m) tall, he was on the leading edge of a wave of American and Australian riders bred on dirt track racing who dominated the 500cc road racing World Championships throughout the 1980s. Baker was inducted into the AMA Motorcycle Hall of Fame in 1999.

== Motorcycle racing career ==
=== Early career ===
Born in Bellingham, Washington, Baker began his career racing on the dirt track ovals of the Pacific Northwest. When Yamaha of Canada's rider, Yvon Duhamel, left to join the Kawasaki factory racing team in 1971, Baker was offered Duhamel's place on the team with Bob Work as his team mechanic. He then switched to road racing and began competing in Canada, becoming a three-time Canadian champion. His experience racing on the rough, bump-strewn Canadian race tracks would help him later in his career when racing on European tracks.

=== AMA competition ===
Baker began competing in the AMA National Championship in 1973 and experienced his first success when he finished second to former world champion Kel Carruthers at the Talladega Superspeedway. In 1974, Yamaha introduced the Yamaha TZ700 motorcycle which was far more powerful than any previous motorcycle made available to the public. Baker spent the year learning to adapt to the increased power but, he suffered a broken leg at Talladega and was forced to miss the remainder of the season.

The motorcycle technology of the late 1970s featured engines with power in excess of what the frames and tires of the day could accommodate. The resulting tire spin caused the motorcycle to buck and shake as it continually lost then regained traction. Baker's dirt track riding experience, where sliding the rear tire to one side is used as a method to steer the motorcycle around a corner, allowed him to adapt to the powerful TZ750 motorcycle that dominated the 750 class during the 1970s.

Baker was one of only five riders to receive a special OW31 Yamaha TZ750 from the Yamaha factory for the 1975 season. He scored a second place behind Gene Romero at the 1975 Daytona 200, then considered to be one of the most prestigious motorcycle races in the world.

Although Baker's Yamaha motorcycle experienced a mechanical failure while leading the 1976 Daytona 200, he won the prestigious Imola 200 pre-season race in Italy. He then traveled to Great Britain to compete for the North American team in the 1976 Transatlantic Trophy match races which, pitted the best British riders against the top North American road racers on 750cc motorcycles in a six-race series. Baker dominated the series as the top individual points leader winning four of the six races.

Baker returned the United States to compete in the AMA Grand National Championship where he earned his first AMA national victory when he won the Loudon Classic. He also won the 250cc support class at Loudon. He repeated his Loudon victories at the Laguna Seca Raceway, again winning the national and the 250c support race. He finished the year by winning the Mallory Park Race of the Year, defeating the reigning World Champion Barry Sheene and multiple World Champion Giacomo Agostini amongst others. By the end of the 1976 season, Baker was considered to be Kenny Roberts' equal in road racing.

=== World Championships ===
Baker's impressive results earned him a promotion to compete in the 1977 500cc World Championship as well as the Formula 750 World Championship supported by the Yamaha of Canada satellite team. He was one of three riders to receive support from the Yamaha factory along with Agostini and Johnny Cecotto. Baker was hindered by not having any previous experience competing on the race circuits used for the World Championship and by not having experience racing in the rain, something not done in North American racing. He was further hindered by FIM regulations that required races to be started with dead engines, making competitors push start their machines. Baker's Yamaha did not start as easily as the numerous Suzuki riders surrounding him meaning that he usually began most races behind his competitors.

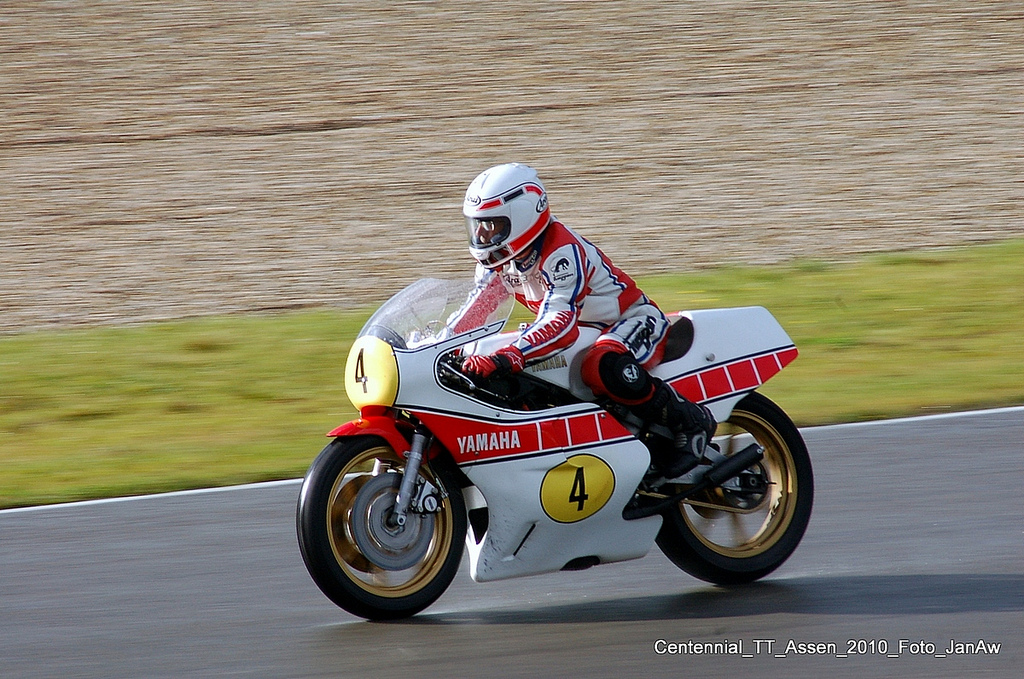
Steve Baker at the 2010 Centennial Classic TT

The 1977 season marked the debut of the Formula 750 World Championship beginning with the Daytona 200. Baker traded the lead with Kenny Roberts several times before he prevailed to win at Daytona. He went on to score five victories along with three second places and two third places to clinch the 1977 Formula 750 World Championship. His victory marked the first time that an American competitor had won an FIM road racing World Championship. Jack Milne had become the first American to win a motorcycling world championship in 1937 when he won the Speedway World Championship.

Whereas the Yamaha TZ750 dominated the 750 class, in the 500 class, Baker had to contend with a field of competitors riding the dominant Suzuki RG 500 motorcycle, led by the defending World Champion Barry Sheene and his factory Suzuki teammate, Pat Hennen. Baker began the 500cc World Championship season with a second place behind Sheene at the Venezuelan Grand Prix. He showed that he was a contender for the championship by sharing the fastest lap time of the race with Sheene. The second round in Austria was marred by crash during the 350cc race that claimed the life of Swiss rider, Hans Stadelmann which led to most of the competitors boycotting the 500cc race. Baker's Yamaha teammate, Johnny Cecotto, suffered a broken arm in the same crash that claimed Stadelmann, leaving Baker to fend for himself against a field of competitors riding the dominant Suzuki RG 500. He was often only Yamaha rider in the entire field.

Despite the lack of teammates, Baker was competitive, finishing in third place behind the factory Suzukis of Sheene and Hennen at the German Grand Prix. He claimed the pole position at the French Grand Prix, but he was unable to stop Sheene from winning his third consecutive race. At the Belgian Grand Prix, he once again finished in second place between the factory Suzuki teammates with Sheene taking the victory. Baker's Yamaha suffered engine problems at the Finnish Grand Prix dropping him to twelfth place while Sheene finished in sixth to clinch the World Championship for the second consecutive year. Baker finished second to Hennen at the British Grand Prix to salvage second place in the season final standings. Sheene and Suzuki dominated the season by winning six of the first eight races while Baker scored three second places, three third places, fourth once and fifth once.

Despite having won the Formula 750 title and scoring a second place in the 500 class, Yamaha declined to offer Baker a European contract for the 1978 season. During the 1977 season, Baker traveled to races accompanied by his fiancée and his sister, who was in a relationship with his mechanic, Bob Work. At the 1977 Dutch TT, the foursome engaged in a domestic dispute in the team garage that was witnessed by Japanese members of Yamaha management. Yamaha management viewed the altercation as unprofessional conduct for a World Championship contender and only offered Baker a motorcycle to compete in AMA events for the 1978 season.

However, Baker was determined to continue racing in the World Championships. With the help of the reigning World Champion, Barry Sheene, he was able to secure a place on the Suzuki of Italy racing team operated by former Grand Prix competitor Roberto Gallina. Gallina later won World Championships with riders Marco Lucchinelli (1981) and Franco Uncini (1982). His best result came at the season-opening Venezuelan Grand Prix with a third place along with a fourth place at the Nations Grand Prix. Despite not finishing in four out of the eleven rounds, Baker ended the 1978 season ranked 7th overall in the 500 World Championship and was the highest ranking privateer rider.

Kenny Roberts won the 1978 500cc World Championship then won two more championships in 1979 and 1980. The 500cc World Championship had been established in 1949 and was more prestigious than the Formula 750 championship, so Roberts' subsequent success overshadowed Baker's career. Despite this, during the late 1970s, Baker was in the upper echelon of World Championship competitors.

At the end of the 1978 season, Baker suffered a devastating accident in a non-championship race at the Mosport circuit in Canada that left him with a broken arm and shattered his left leg. He committed to ride for team owner Sid Griffiths in the 1979 British National Championships however, at the second round of the series at Brands Hatch, he crashed heavily at the Paddock Hill bend and repeated the injuries that he had sustained in Canada the previous year. Afterwards, Baker decided to retire from competitive racing at the age of 28.

After his racing career, Baker purchased and operated a motorcycle dealership in his hometown of Bellingham. He was inducted into the AMA Motorcycle Hall of Fame in 1999.

== Motorcycle Grand Prix results ==
**Position**	1	2	3	4	5	6	7	8	9	10
**Points**	15	12	10	8	6	5	4	3	2	1

(key) (Races in bold indicate pole position)

Yr	Class	Team	Machine	1	2	3	4	5	6	7	8	9	10	11	Rank	Pts
1977	500cc	Yamaha International	YZR500 (0W35)	VEN; 2	AUT; DNF	GER; 3	NAT; 4	**FRA**; 3	NED; 5	BEL; 2	SWE; 3	FIN; 12	CZE; DNF	GBR; 2	2nd	80
1977	Formula 750	Yamaha International	YZR750 (0W31)	USA; 1	ITA; 2	ESP; 1	FRA; 3	GBR; 1	AUT; 1	BEL; 1	NED; 2	USA; 2	CAN; 3	GER -	1st	131
1978	500cc	Team Gallina Nava Olio Fiat	RG500	VEN; 3	SPA; 6	AUT; DNF	FRA; NS	NAT; 4	NED; 9	BEL; DNF	SWE; 4	FIN; 6	GBR; DNF	GER; 7	7th	42
1978	Formula 750	Team Gallina Nava Olio Fiat	YZR750	ITA; 2	FRA; 3	UK -	AUT -	ESP; 7	GER -	BEL -	NED -	USA; 2	CAN -		6th	38
