= Víctor Palomo =

Spanish motorcycle racer

- Nationality: Spanish
- Born: 26 May 1948; Barcelona, Spain
- Died: 11 February 1985 (aged 36); Girona, Spain
Motorcycle racing career statistics
Grand Prix motorcycle racing
Active years	1972 - 1977, 1979, 1982
First race	1972 250cc Spanish Grand Prix
Last race	1982 500cc Spanish Grand Prix
First win	1974 350cc Spanish Grand Prix
Last win	1974 350cc Spanish Grand Prix
Team	Yamaha
Championships	1976 Formula 750
Starts / Wins / Podiums / Poles / F. laps / Points; 34 / 1 / 8 / 1 / 0 / 202

Víctor Palomo Juez (25 May 1948 – 11 February 1985) was a Spanish world champion water skier, Grand Prix motorcycle road racer and Olympic bobsleigh pilot.

== Sporting career ==
Born in Barcelona, Spain, Palomo began water skiing in 1959 and in 1964, he won the Spanish water skiing national championship for juveniles. He was also crowned the European Junior Championship, a title he won two more times. In 1968, Palomo represented Spain as a member of the Spanish bobsleigh team in the 1968 Winter Olympics held in Grenoble, France.

Palomo won the 1969 water skiing slalom world championship at the age of 21. The following year, he broke both knees during a training incident. After recovering from his injuries, he went to Belgium where he bought a ČZ motorcycle and began to race in motocross competitions. In 1971, Palomo gave up water skiing to concentrate on motorcycle racing. He raced off-road on an Ossa enduro motorcycle until an injury made him decide to switch to road racing. In 1972, he met the Gus Kuhn team who agreed to sponsor him on a Norton motorcycle at events in the UK and Europe. Barry Sheene was also instrumental in helping Palomo prepare his privateer Yamaha for Grand Prix racing.

Palomo scored his first podium in 1973 at the 350cc German Grand Prix where he finished in second place behind Teuvo Länsivuori. At the Nations Grand Prix at Monza that year, he was involved in the tragic accident that took the lives of Jarno Saarinen and Renzo Pasolini. Palomo was injured in June after crashing at the Yugoslavian Grand Prix which led to him missing the rest of the 1973 season and part of 1974. He then won the 1974 350cc Spanish Grand Prix held on his home track at the Montjuich Circuit. In 1975 he competed in the 250cc, 350cc and Formula 750 championships.

Palomo's most successful year was in 1976, when he finished in sixth place in the 350cc world championship, and won the 1976 Formula 750 world championship riding a Yamaha. The confused results of the Venezuelan Formula 750 round caused the championship's final standings to be shrouded in controversy. Kawasaki's Gary Nixon appeared to have won the second leg of the Venezuelan race however, the race organizers credited Yamaha's Steve Baker with the victory. Palomo was crowned champion, winning three races on aggregate time despite not winning a single heat. If Nixon had been awarded the victory in the Venezuelan round, he would have won the world championship by one point. Nixon protested the Venezuelan results to the FIM, who threw out the results of the event, thus denying his appeal.

Palomo's 1977 season got off to a promising start however, he suffered serious spinal cord injuries at a non-championship event at the Paul Ricard Circuit. He tried to return to competition too quickly and suffered yet another crash which again forced him to take time off to recuperate. He spent the 1978 season competing in the Spanish 750cc national championship before returning to the world championships in 1979 as well as partnering 250 World Champion Mario Lega in the FIM Endurance World Championship on a Ducati. At the 24 Hours of Montjuich race, Palomo suffered another serious accident. The accident shattered his leg and the operations led to further complications which kept him away from racing until 1981. In 1982 he entered several World Championship events in the 250cc and 500cc classes but, suffered yet another accident.

== Death ==
Palomo had numerous complicated operations along with treatments to promote bone recovery. The powerful painkillers, combined with his diabetic condition, caused serious side effects with heart and liver failure, which led to his death in 1985 at the age of 36 in Girona, Spain.
