= Formula 750 =

Motorcycle road racing series

- Category: Motorcycle racing
- Inaugural season: 1973
- Folded: 1979
- Last Riders' champion: Patrick Pons

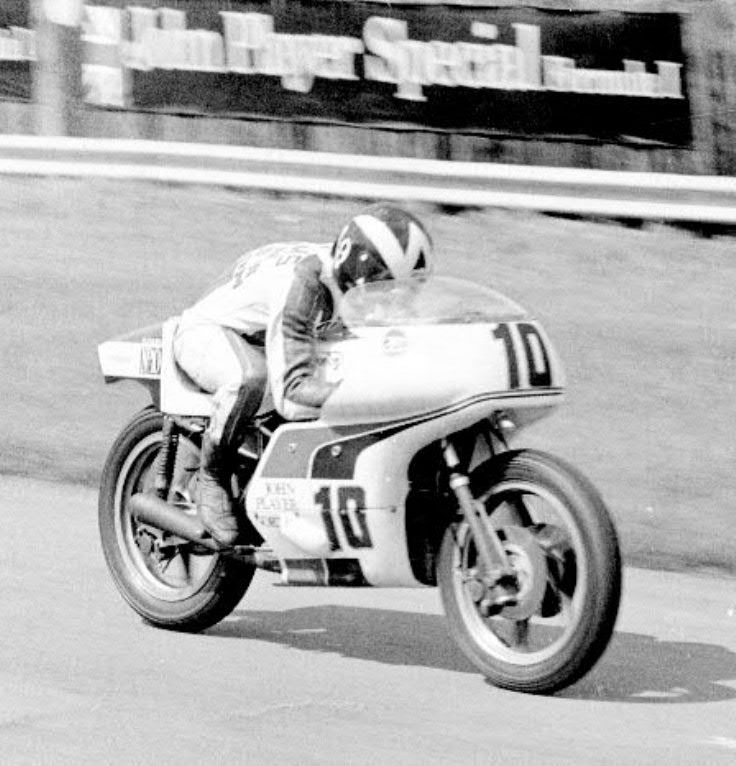
Works Norton rider Peter Williams on the JPS-liveried 1974 'Spaceframe' Norton factory F750 racer

Formula 750 was a FIM motorcycle road racing series based on a 750 cubic centimeter engine capacity.

== History ==
The series began in 1971 as a collaboration between the American Motorcyclist Association and the Auto Cycle Union. The FIM adopted the Formula 750 class for events in 1972.

In 1973 it became a British-based series. In 1975 the series was upgraded to European championship status and in 1977, it attained world championship status.

The Formula 750 class was seen as possibly overtaking the 500cc Grand Prix class as the premier racing division. However, the ultimate domination by one model (the Yamaha TZ750) as well as the increasingly popular superbike production class meant that the FIM discontinued the class after the 1979 season.

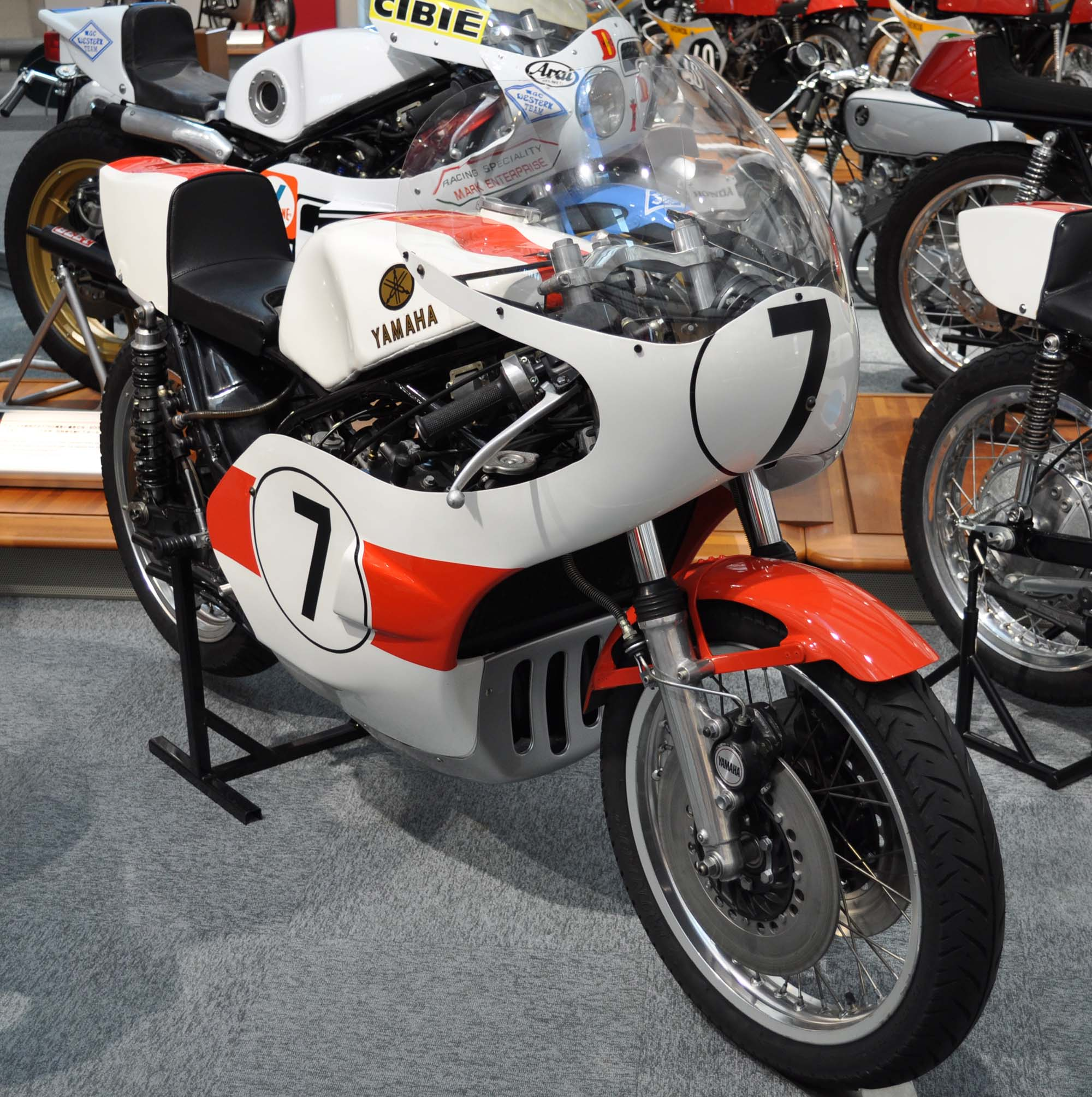
Yamaha TZ750

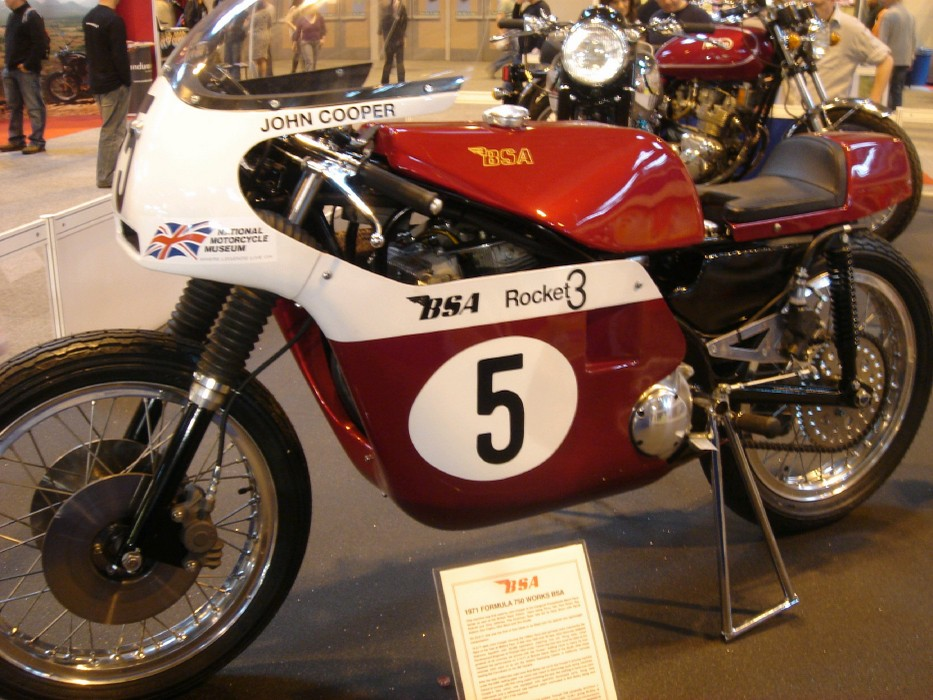
John Cooper 1971 BSA Rocket 3 F750 class

== Formula 750 champions ==
Season	Rider	Manufacturer
1973	(United Kingdom) Barry Sheene	Suzuki
1974	(Australia) John Dodds	Yamaha
1975	(Australia) Jack Findlay	Yamaha
1976	(Spain) Víctor Palomo	Yamaha
1977	(United States) Steve Baker	Yamaha
1978	(Venezuela) Johnny Cecotto	Yamaha
1979	(France) Patrick Pons	Yamaha
