= 1973 Formula 750 season =

1973 Formula 750 Prize

Champions
- Winner: Barry Sheene (Suzuki)

Seasons
- ← none 1974 →

The 1973 Formula 750 season was the first season of the FIM Formula 750 Prize. The series had previously been run as a British competition under ACU rules. Ten races were held over seven rounds. Although disqualified at Silverstone for using a different bike in the second race, Barry Sheene won the championship.

== Calendar ==
1973 Calendar
Round	Race title	Circuit	Date	Heat 1 Winner	Heat 2 Winner	Overall winner
1	Imola 200	(Italy) Imola	April 15	(Finland) Jarno Saarinen	(Finland) Jarno Saarinen	(Finland) Jarno Saarinen
2	France (Note: The rounds in France, Sweden, Finland and Spain were run as a single race)	(France) Clermont-Ferrand	May 27	(United Kingdom) Barry Sheene		
3	GP de Suède (Note: The round in Sweden was part of the Swedish motorcycle Grand Prix weekend)	(Sweden) Anderstorp	July 22	(Australia) Jack Findlay		
4	Finland	(Finland) Hämeenlinna	August 1	(Finland) Teuvo Länsivuori		
5	John Player International	(United Kingdom) Silverstone	August 12	(United Kingdom) Paul Smart	(United Kingdom) Paul Smart	(United Kingdom) Paul Smart
6	Germany	(Germany) Hockenheim	September 30	(Australia) Jack Findlay	(United Kingdom) Stan Woods	(United Kingdom) Stan Woods
7	Spain	(Spain) Montjuïc	October 7	(Australia) John Dodds		

Notes

The Ontario Motor Speedway in California, US was scheduled to hold a round in May 1973. Due to financial difficulties and management changes the event was rescheduled to October. The FIM rules are that a race date cannot be changed once the calendar is ratified so would not sanction the race. The race was therefore run as an AMA Road Race National not a F750 event.

== Points system ==
Points for each event were awarded as below, events at Imola, Silverstone and Hockenheim consisted of two races and points were awarded by aggregate times of the two. At Hockenheim, Jack Findlay won the first race but fell in the second. As there was no aggregate time over the two rounds for him he wasn't awarded points. Suzuki objected and the points awarded were based on positions in each race.

Position	1	2	3	4	5	6	7	8	9	10
Points	15	12	10	8	6	5	4	3	2	1

Only the four best results achieved by a rider counted towards the championship standings.

== Championship standings ==
Pos	Rider	Bike	IMO (Italy)	CHA (France)	AND (Sweden)	HEM (Finland)	SIL (United Kingdom)	HOC (Germany)	MON (Spain)	Points (gross) (Note: Only the best four results achieved by a rider counted towards the championship. Total points obtained in brackets)
1	(United Kingdom) Barry Sheene	Suzuki TR750	-	1	3	2	DSQ	2	2	51 (61)
2	(Australia) John Dodds	Yamaha TZ 350	-	2	-	-	3	3	1	47
3	(Australia) Jack Findlay	Suzuki 750	6	-	1	3	2	5	4	45 (56)
4	(United Kingdom) Stan Woods	Suzuki 750	-	4	2	5	-	1	6	41 (46)
5	(Italy) Guido Mandracci	Suzuki 750	-	-	4	4	-	-	3	26
6	(Finland) Teuvo Länsivuori	Yamaha 350	4	-	-	1	-	-	-	23
7	(Finland) Jarno Saarinen	Yamaha 350	1	-	-	-	-	-	-	15
=	(United Kingdom) Paul Smart	Suzuki 750	-	-	-	-	1	-	-	15
9	(United Kingdom) Ron Chandler	Triumph 750	8	5	-	-	7	-	-	13
10	(Italy) Bruno Spaggiari	Ducati 750SS	2	-	-	-	-	-	-	12
11	(Italy) Walter Villa	Kawasaki H2R	3	-	-	-	-	-	-	10
=	(United Kingdom) Peter Williams	John Player Norton	-	3	-	-	-	-	-	10
13	(United Kingdom) Mick Grant	Yamaha 350	-	-	-	-	4	-	-	8
=	(Germany) Dieter Braun	Yamaha 350	-	-	-	-	-	4	-	8
15	(Switzerland) Werner Giger	Yamaha 350	-	-	-	-	-	7	8	7
16	(Australia) Kel Carruthers	Yamaha 350	5	-	-	-	-	-	-	6
=	(France) Michel Rougerie	Harley-Davidson XR-750	-	-	5	-	-	-	-	6
=	(United Kingdom) John Newbold	Yamaha 350	-	-	-	-	5	-	-	6
=	(Switzerland) Alain Genoud	Honda CR750	-	-	-	-	-	-	5	6
20	(Switzerland) Gilbert Argo	Honda 750	-	6	-	-	-	-	-	5
=	(Sweden) Johnny Bengtsson	Yamaha 350	-	-	6	-	-	-	-	5
=	(Switzerland) Bruno Kneubühler	Yamaha 350	-	-	-	6	-	-	-	5
=	(United Kingdom) Pat Mahoney	Kawasaki 750	-	-	-	-	6	-	-	5
=	(United Kingdom) Billie Nelson	Yamaha 350	-	-	-	-	-	6	-	5
25	(Switzerland) Philippe Coulon	Yamaha 350	-	8	-	-	-	9	-	5
26	(Switzerland) Werner Pfirter	Yamaha 350	7	-	-	-	-	-	-	4
=	(United Kingdom) Percy Tait	Triumph 750	-	7	-	-	-	-	-	4
=	(Italy) Roberto Gallina	Honda 750	-	-	7	-	-	-	-	4
=	(Netherlands) Marcel Ankoné	Yamsel 350	-	-	-	7	-	-	-	4
=	(France) Olivier Chevallier	Yamaha 350	-	-	-	-	-	-	7	4
31	(United Kingdom) David Nixon	Triumph 750	-	-	8	-	-	-	-	3
=	(Finland) Eero Hyvärinen	Yamaha 350	-	-	-	8	-	-	-	3
=	(United Kingdom) Darryl Pendlebury	Triumph 750	-	-	-	-	8	-	-	3
=	(South Africa) Kork Ballington	Yamaha 350	-	-	-	-	-	8	-	3
35	(United Kingdom) Derek Chatterton	Yamaha 350	9	-	-	-	-	-	-	2
=	(France) Michel Garnier	Moto Guzzi V7 Sport	-	9	-	-	-	-	-	2
=	(Sweden) Lars Påhlsson	Yamaha 350	-	-	9	-	-	-	-	2
=	(Finland) Seppo Kangasniemi	Yamaha 350	-	-	-	9	-	-	-	2
=	(France) Éric Offenstadt	Kawasaki 750	-	-	-	-	9	-	-	2
=	(Spain) Víctor Palomo	Yamaha 350	-	-	-	-	-	-	9	2
41	(Italy) Galeazzo Pederneschi	Yamaha 350	10	-	-	-	-	-	-	1
=	(Denmark) Franz Kroon	Yamaha 350	-	10	-	-	-	-	-	1
=	(Italy) Armando Toracca	Honda 750	-	-	10	-	-	-	-	1
=	(Finland) Pekka Nurmi	Yamaha 350	-	-	-	10	-	-	-	1
=	(United Kingdom) Martin Sharpe	BSA 750	-	-	-	-	10	-	-	1
=	(Germany) Klaus Leonhardt	Yamaha 350	-	-	-	-	-	10	-	1
=	(Finland) Pentti Korhonen	Yamaha 350	-	-	-	-	-	-	10	1
Pos	Rider	Bike	IMO (Italy)	CHA (France)	AND (Sweden)	HEM (Finland)	SIL (United Kingdom)	HOC (Germany)	MON (Spain)	Points (gross)

Colour	Result
Gold	Winner
Silver	Second place
Bronze	Third place
Green	Points classification
Blue	Non-points classification
Blue	Non-classified finish (NC)
Purple	Retired, not classified (Ret)
Red	Did not qualify (DNQ)
Red	Did not pre-qualify (DNPQ)
Black	Disqualified (DSQ)
White	Did not start (DNS)
White	Withdrew (WD)
White	Race cancelled (C)
Blank	Did not practice (DNP)
Blank	Did not arrive (DNA)
Blank	Excluded (EX)
