= Barry Sheene =

British motorcycle racer and racing driver (1950–2003)

Barry Sheene MBE
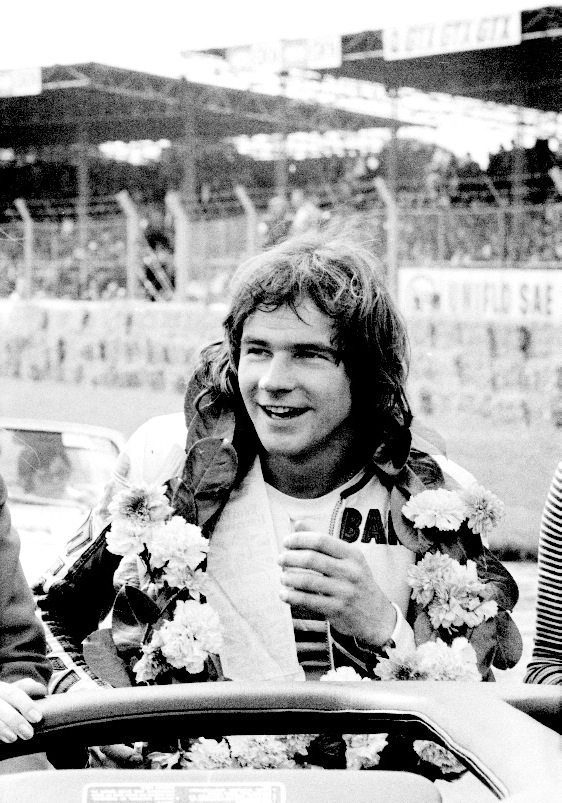
- Sheene in 1975
- Nationality: British
- Born: 11 September 1950; London, England
- Died: 10 March 2003 (aged 52); Gold Coast, Queensland, Australia
Motorcycle racing career statistics
Grand Prix motorcycle racing
Active years	1970–1984
First race	1970 125cc Spanish Grand Prix
Last race	1984 500cc San Marino Grand Prix
First win	1971 125cc Belgian Grand Prix
Last win	1981 500cc Swedish Grand Prix
Team(s)	Suzuki, Yamaha
Championships	Formula 750 – 1973; 500cc – 1976, 1977
Starts / Wins / Podiums / Poles / F. laps / Points; 104 / 23 / 52 / 18 / 20

Barry Steven Frank Sheene (11 September 1950 – 10 March 2003) was a British professional motorcycle racer and television sports presenter. He competed in Grand Prix motorcycle racing between 1971 and 1984, most prominently as a member of the Suzuki factory racing team where he won two consecutive FIM World Championships in 1976 and 1977, and the Race of the Year in 1974, 1975 and 1978. Sheene remains the last British competitor to win the premier class of FIM road racing competitions. He was the first motorcycle racer to gain commercial endorsements from outside the sport, including television advertisements for Brut cologne.

Sheene was also a strong proponent of race track safety, and was one of the first competitors to object to racing at the notoriously dangerous Isle of Man TT street circuit. He recognized his value to race promoters as a gate attraction and used his influence to force race promoters to increase rider safety.

After a racing career stretching from 1968 to 1984, Sheene retired from competition and relocated to Australia, working as a motorsport commentator and property developer. In 2011, the FIM inducted Sheene into the MotoGP Hall of Fame.

== Early life ==
Barry Steven Frank Sheene was born on September 11, 1950, off the Gray's Inn Road, Bloomsbury, London, where his father, Frank Sheene, worked as the resident engineer at the Royal College of Surgeons. His father was a former competitive motorcyclist and an experienced motorcycle mechanic. He grew up in Queen Square, Holborn, London, where he learned to ride a motorcycle at the age of 5 aboard a homemade minibike built by his father. Before he raced motorcycles competitively, Sheene found work as a motorcycle courier and delivery driver.

== Career ==
=== First foray into racing ===
Sheene's father had developed a close, personal relationship with Don Paco Bultó, the owner of Bultaco motorcycles, after meeting him in 1959 while attending the Montjuïc 24 Hour endurance race in Barcelona. Frank Sheene was one of the first proponents of the two-stroke engine that began to dominate the smaller engine classes of motorcycle racing in the mid-1960s. Bultó began to supply the Sheene family with his latest motorcycles.

As a young boy, Sheene's first interest in competitive motorcycling was in off-road motorcycle trials. He soon found that he enjoyed speeding between trials sections rather than the trial itself, and decided that he would be better at road circuits. Sheene had no plans to become a motorcycle racer, instead he focused on learning the art of tuning two-stroke engines, which were difficult to master unless a person was prepared to dedicate considerable time in a workshop learning the intricacies of the engines. His father noticed that he was a naturally talented rider and he was entered into his first road race in 1968 at the age of 17 riding a Bultaco motorcycle.

In his first race at the Brands Hatch Circuit, Sheene suffered a crash when the engine on his 125cc Bultaco seized (The cc initials refer to the engine displacement in cubic centimeters). Undaunted by the experience, he mounted his 250cc Bultaco a few minutes later and finished in third place in the 250 class. Returning to Brands Hatch the following weekend, he would score his first victory. Sheene then stopped racing to become the race mechanic for British privateer Lewis Young, who had entered his Bultacos in several European Grands Prix races. His experiences from attending the European races seemed to ignite Sheene's interest in becoming a motorcycle racer.

Sheene was not a keen school student and had an aversion to authority figures, so he began to see motorcycle racing as a possible career path. He sometimes would skip school and attend practice sessions at nearby Brands Hatch circuit. In 1969, Sheene began wearing a crash helmet with an image of Donald Duck on the front of his helmet to stand out from the crowd. The helmet design would remain his trademark throughout his racing career, as well as his racing number 7. He drilled a hole in the chin piece of his crash helmet so he could smoke a cigarette while waiting on the starting grid for a race to begin. A cigarette smoker since the age of nine, he favoured Gitanes cigarettes with a heavy tar content, which would later contribute to his death from cancer in 2003.

Sheene made a big impression as an eighteen-year-old in 1969 when he rode a Bultaco to place second behind Chas Mortimer in the 1969 125cc British Championship, and then dominated the 1970 125cc British Championship. He also placed third in the 1970 250cc Championship aboard a Bultaco. His father Frank served as his mechanic, a position he would hold throughout Sheene's racing career.

In 1970, Sheene and his father borrowed £2,000 (£36,720 in 2023), to purchase a twin-cylinder 125cc Suzuki RT67, a former factory racing team motorcycle campaigned by Stuart Graham in the 1968 World Championships and in selected 1969 events. Although it was an expensive purchase, the ex-factory race bike helped to launch Sheene's international racing career.

Sheene first met two-time American champion, Gary Nixon in 1971, when Nixon was a member of the American team competing in that year's Transatlantic Trophy match races. The Transatlantic Trophy match races pitted the best British riders against the top American road racers on 750cc motorcycles in a six-race series during Easter weekend in England. The two racers bonded and developed a lifelong friendship. Sheene began wearing his Gary Nixon t-shirt beneath his leather riding suit as a good luck charm every time he raced.

=== Grand Prix racing ===
In 1971, Sheene entered the 125cc World Championship aboard the same Suzuki. He provoked a controversy at the 1971 Isle of Man TT races when he crashed out of the event while lying in second place, and then outraged traditionalists when he criticised the event as unworthy of Grand Prix status. He loudly announced that it would be the last time he ever competed at the Isle of Man TT at a time when the race was considered the most prestigious event on the world championship calendar. As a young boy, Sheene had attended the TT races with his father and appreciated the history of the event; however, he felt that racing against the clock on a street circuit for world championship points was too dangerous.

Sheene scored his maiden Grand Prix victory with a win at the 125cc Belgian Grand Prix held at the challenging Circuit de Spa-Francorchamps. The championship battle in the 50cc World Championship between Derbi's Ángel Nieto and Kreidler's Jan de Vries was so heated that the Kreidler team hired Sheene and Jarno Saarinen to race in support of de Vries, while the Derbi factory hired rider Gilberto Parlotti in support of Nieto. After de Vries retired with engine problems, Sheene went on to win the 50cc Czechoslovakian Grand Prix held at the Masaryk Circuit, where he finished over two and a half minutes ahead of the competition. By denying points to the opposition, Sheene helped de Vries secure the 1971 50cc World Championship.

The 125cc championship then moved to the Scandinavian countries where Sheene won the Swedish and Finnish Grands Prix races to take the lead in the 125cc World Championship going into the final round at the Spanish Grand Prix held at the Jarama Circuit. At the prestigious, non-championship Mallory Park Race of the Year, Sheene won the Lightweight Support Class ahead of Saarinen and Rod Gould. He suffered a broken rib while competing in the Race of the Year. The following weekend, while riding with the broken rib, he finished in third while his principal rival, Ángel Nieto won the race to clinch the 125cc World Championship. Nieto's victory relegated Sheene to second place in the World Championship, a respectable result considering it was his rookie season. Sheene had immense respect for Nieto, calling him one of his greatest rivals.

For the 1972 season, Sheene was signed by Yamaha factory to ride a specially made Yamaha YZ635 in the 250cc World Championship under the French Yamaha importer Sonauto's sponsorship. There was no Yamaha factory racing team at the time, but Sheene was one of six riders receiving support from the factory. At the third round in Austria, after losing a sprint to the finish line to the Australian John Dodds for third place, he voiced his displeasure to team management about the performance of the motorcycle. The next Grand Prix was the Grand Prix of Nations at Imola at the end of May, but Sheene crashed in practice and broke his collarbone, preventing him from taking part in the race, and in the subsequent Isle of Man TT race as well. The next seven races of the world championship all took place in close succession in June and July and Sheene was not fit to take part in them.

After the Yugoslavian Grand Prix, Sheene's factory-supported Yamaha YZ635 was given to Jarno Saarinen, already a Yamaha factory rider in the 350cc class, who went on to win four races and the 250cc World Championship that year. Once back to fitness, Sheene would get factory-supported Yamahas back for British races over the summer (Silverstone, Scarborough, Mallory Park) and for the last Grand Prix of the season, at the Montjuïc circuit in Spain on 23 September, where he scored a third place in the 250cc class.

=== 1973 Suzuki team leader ===
Sheene was signed by the Suzuki factory racing team along with teammates Jack Findlay and Paul Smart during the off season 1972–1973. He began the 1973 season as a member of the British team riding a Suzuki TR750 in the 1973 Transatlantic Trophy match races where his best result came at the third round at Oulton Park, placing third behind Peter Williams on a John Player Norton and Yvon Duhamel on a Kawasaki H2R.

Sheene then contested the British 500cc Championships riding a Suzuki TR500, but when he found that the motorcycle handled poorly, he replaced Suzuki's chassis with a frame designed by British constructor Colin Seeley. He also rode the TR750 to contest the British 750cc Championship and won the newly formed Formula 750 European championship in 1973. He was the first as well as the only non-Yamaha rider to win a Formula 750 championship. As a Suzuki factory rider Sheene had two contracts, with the World Championship events taking precedence over his Suzuki GB contract for home and international events, if any race dates clashed. At the end of the year, Sheene was voted "Man of the Year" by the readers of Motor Cycle News.

Prior to the beginning of the 1974 season, the dominant MV Agusta factory racing team offered Sheene a position on their team. Sheene refused their offer, knowing that Suzuki was developing a new motorcycle to compete in the 500cc class. At the time, the 500cc class was considered to be the premier division in Motorcycle Grand Prix racing. It was not an easy decision for Sheene as the powerful MV Agusta team had won the previous 16 500cc World Championships.

Sheene was again named to the British team for the 1974 Transatlantic Trophy match races where he first encountered American racer Kenny Roberts, who would become his arch-rival. Roberts twice relegated Sheene to second place in two heat races at Mallory Park before Sheene was able to win over Roberts in the first race at Oulton Park. Roberts then reversed the results in the final event of the series. Sheene's TR750 motorcycle was no match for Robert's water-cooled Yamaha TZ750 which would dominate the 750cc class throughout the 1970s.

=== 1974: Development of the RG500 ===
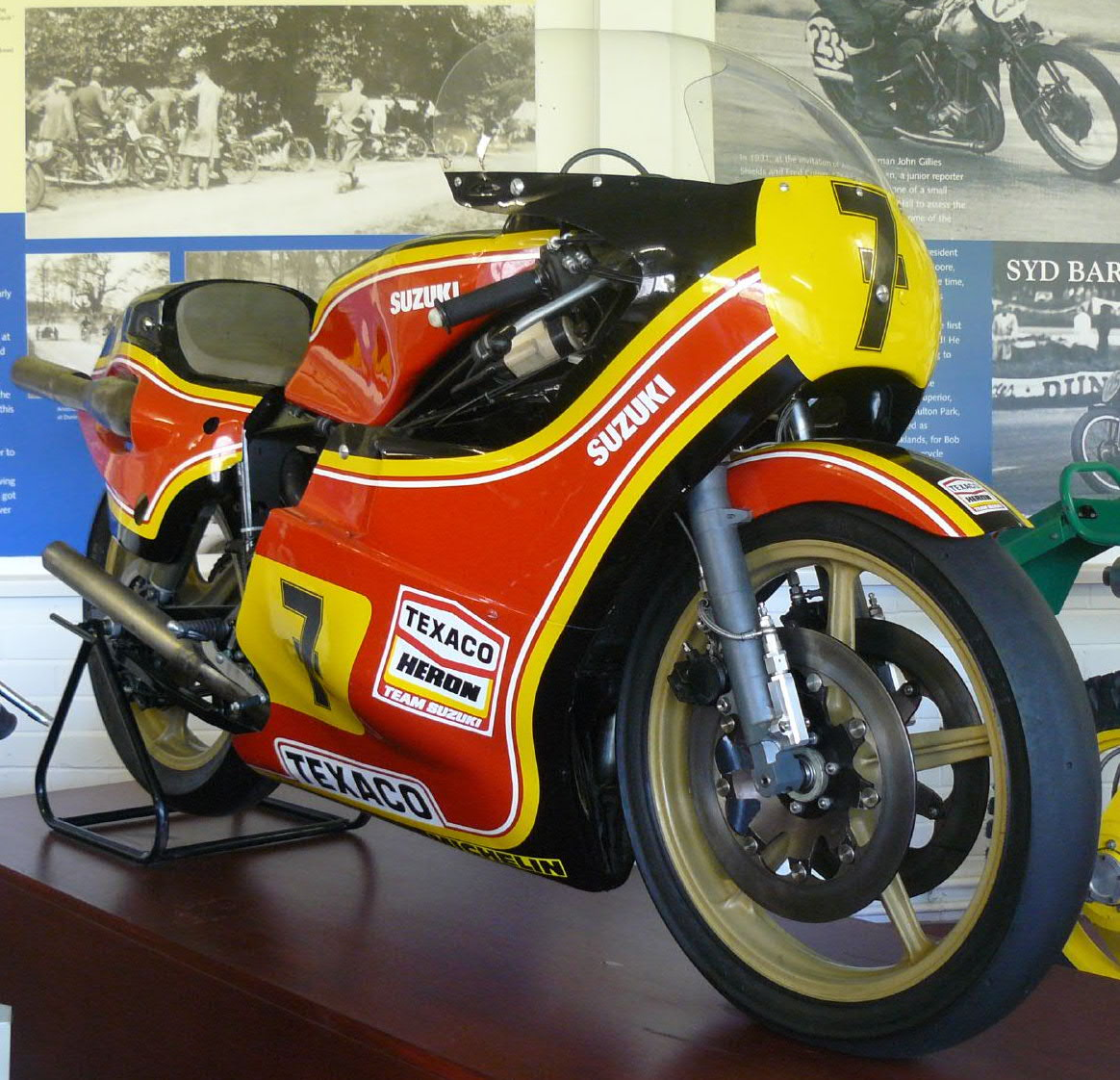
Sheene's Suzuki RG500

Suzuki introduced the new RG500 motorcycle for the 1974 season, and Sheene secured its first podium results when he rode the raw, unrefined machine to a second place in France and a third place in Austria to start the season. After Sheene suffered a broken leg in a crash at the Nations Grand Prix held at the Imola Circuit, he missed the next six rounds of the World Championship. Upon recovering from his injury, he placed fourth at the Czechoslovakian Grand Prix, and finished the season ranked sixth in the 1974 500cc World Championship. Also in 1974, he won the prestigious Mallory Park Race of the Year.

At the end of the 1974 season, the Suzuki factory was left disappointed by their efforts on the RG500 project and seemed to be losing their motivation to continue. Sheene had become vested in the project and took pride in seeing his suggested modifications being implemented and improving the motorcycle's performance, so he urged the factory to continue their efforts, offering to stay in Japan to help them develop the motorcycle until it performed to his satisfaction. Suzuki agreed and he spent five weeks in Japan during the offseason, helping engineers on the development work for the RG500.

=== Daytona crash ===
By the mid-1970s, the Daytona 200 motorcycle race had become a significant motorcycle race for manufacturers, as they fought for shares of the American motorcycle market, whose main source of demand was the baby boomer generation. The 1974 victory by 15-time world champion Giacomo Agostini assisted in solidifying the Daytona 200's reputation as a prestigious motorcycle race.

Sheene arrived for the 1975 Daytona 200 with a BBC documentary team following him to record his experiences. The BBC crew was filming Sheene during practice for the race when the tyre on Sheene's motorcycle delaminated at approximately 180 mph. The motorcycle pitched sideways, sending Sheene tumbling down the track. He suffered severe injuries including a broken left femur, right arm, collarbone and two ribs. The BBC coverage of his accident and subsequent recovery made Sheene a household name in Britain.

=== The Jet-Set lifestyle ===
As Sheene's racing career flourished, so did his fame and fortune. He enjoyed a lavish lifestyle, driving a Rolls-Royce and buying a helicopter which he learned to fly. He was often seen in the company of fashion models and musicians and was personal friends with James Hunt, Ringo Starr and George Harrison.

In 1975, while on crutches from his Daytona accident, Sheene met fashion-model-turned-glamour-model Stephanie McLean, who was Penthouse Pet of the Month for April 1970 and Pet of the Year in 1971, while they were working together on a photoshoot for Chrysler. He made tabloid news in Britain when McLean left her first husband for Sheene. They would marry in 1984 and had two children, Sidonie and Freddie.

Sheene became the motorcycling racing's first multi-millionaire, purchasing homes in Putney, in south-west London, and in Wisbech, Cambridgeshire, and in 1977 he purchased a 700-year-old manor house in Charlwood, Surrey once owned by the actress Gladys Cooper. A shrewd businessman with a penchant for self-promotion, he attracted sponsors from outside the motorcycle industry from clothing, electronics and tobacco companies. He was also contracted by Faberge to promote their Brut aftershave lotion alongside boxer Henry Cooper.

=== 1975: Return to form ===
Despite his serious injuries, Sheene recovered and was racing again seven weeks afterwards. On June 28, only three months after his horrific crash at Daytona, he returned to the world championship at the Assen TT Circuit for the 1975 Dutch TT. Sheene surprised observers who may have expected a gradual return to health by claiming the pole position over second-placed Giacomo Agostini, now riding for the Yamaha factory racing team. Agostini was nearing the end of his career while the twenty-five-year-old Sheene was approaching his prime. Sheene then claimed a dramatic victory in the race with a well-planned last corner pass around the outside of Agostini. Both competitors received the same race time.

At the 1975 Swedish Grand Prix, Sheene set the lap record while winning the Formula 750 round on Saturday, then set the 500cc lap record while winning the 500cc Grand Prix race on Sunday. He started the 500cc race slowly, but worked his way through the field to catch and pass both Agostini and Phil Read, who were the championship points leaders. Sheene took the victory ahead of Read while Agostini crashed out of the race. He placed sixth in the 1975 500cc World Championship, but his late season victory showed that Suzuki was becoming a serious challenger. Sheene won three rounds of the 1975 Formula 750 championship, but finished one point behind the eventual champion, Jack Findlay aboard a Yamaha TZ750, who was able to score consistently in six rounds. Sheene once again won the Mallory Park Race of the Year.

Sheene returned to Daytona in 1976, where he flamboyantly drove around the town in a Rolls-Royce on loan to him from the local dealer. By 1976 the 750cc class was becoming dominated by the powerful Yamaha TZ750, Agostini's 1974 Daytona 200 victory on a Yamaha TZ750 marked the first of ten consecutive Daytona victories for the TZ750. and Sheene circulated as high as third place on his under-powered Suzuki until he was forced to retire with engine problems.

Back in Europe, Sheene was the top British points scorer and the only British rider to score a win with a victory at Mallory Park, as Great Britain defeated the United States in the 1976 Transatlantic Trophy match races. Yamaha's Steve Baker was the dominant rider with four victories in the six race series.

=== 1976 World Champion ===
In the 500cc World Championships, Sheene worked hard to develop the RG500 race bike with his Suzuki team engineers. By the 1976 season, his Suzuki was at the cutting edge of motorcycle racing technology, but Yamaha had withdrawn their factory team from the World Championships and the Suzuki factory wanted to do the same in order to concentrate their funding on development of the company's first range of four-stroke production motorcycles known as the Suzuki GS series. The factory also began to produce customer versions of the RG500 and made them available to the public in 1976.

Suzuki's British importer intervened and convinced the Suzuki factory to allow the importer to continue as Suzuki's representative in the World Championships. The British Suzuki team, named Heron-Suzuki after their principal sponsor, Heron International, consisted of riders Barry Sheene, John Newbold and John Williams. Sheene liked to win races off the track as well as on the track, often using psychological games to distract or upset his rivals. He used his status with the Suzuki factory to ensure that he received the best RG500 engines over his teammates. The Suzuki factory allotted three RG 500 motorcycles for the British team in 1976, ostensibly one motorcycle for each rider, but when Sheene appropriated all three motorcycles for himself, it created animosity among his teammates as they had to compete with the team's 1975 RG 500s. Sheene's elevated status within the team eventually led to the departure of John Williams after the 1976 season, who felt that Sheene had received preferential treatment.

Without Japanese mechanics to support him, Sheene put together a team consisting of his father Frank and Don Mackay, an electrician by trade. The customer version of the RG500 was almost as competitive as Sheene's factory motorcycle and became the motorcycle of choice for privateer racers including Phil Read, Teuvo Länsivuori, and newcomers Marco Lucchinelli and Pat Hennen.

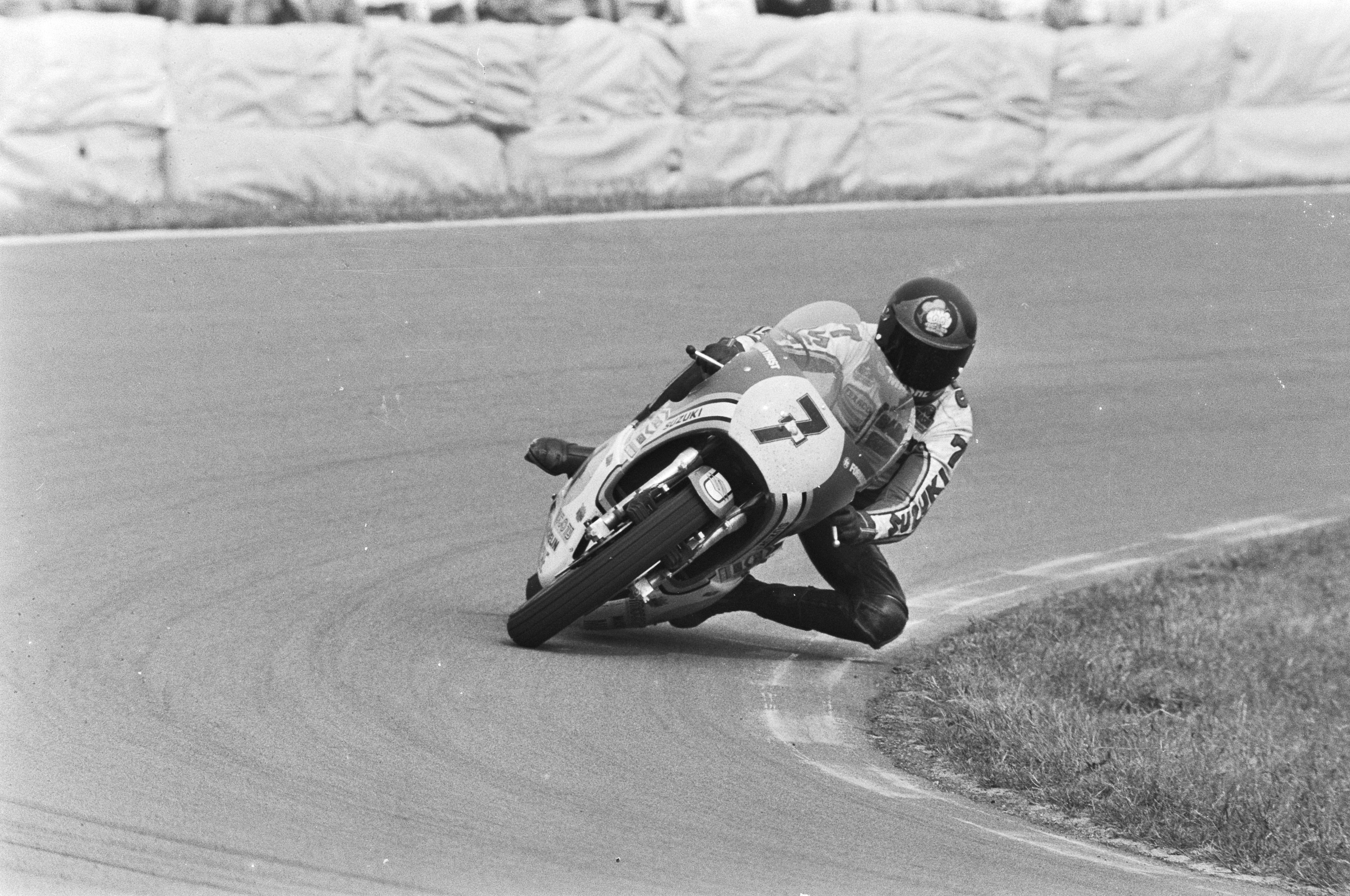
Sheene en route to winning the 1976 Dutch TT race.

With Sheene fully recovered from his Daytona injuries, he took control of the championship from the start of the season by winning the first three races, including a dramatic race-long battle with Read at the Nations Grand Prix where Sheene won by 0.1 seconds. After sitting out the 1976 Isle of Man TT (then in its final season on the World Championship calendar), he won the Dutch TT by 45 seconds over Hennen before his motorcycle experienced mechanical trouble at the Belgian Grand Prix and he placed second to his Suzuki GB teammate John Williams.

The loss of Japanese technical support became apparent at a British championship race at the Snetterton Circuit when someone had forgotten to insert his motorcycle's brake pins, causing Sheene to crash when the brakes failed. The damage required a complete rebuild of the motorcycle, and when they arrived at the next World Championship round in Sweden, they discovered that the wrong triple clamps were installed on his number one motorcycle, while the wrong gearbox had been installed in his number two motorcycle. Sheene then discovered that one brake pad had been inserted backwards, a potentially fatal error. Although suspicion fell on his elderly father, who was his lead mechanic, Sheene never publicly blamed anyone for mistakes. The team recovered from their self-inflicted errors with Sheene qualifying second-fastest in Sweden behind pole-sitter Länsivuori.

Sheene experienced more drama during qualifying for the Swedish Grand Prix when his teammate, John Williams was knocked unconscious after a hard crash. Sheene stopped his motorcycle on the racetrack and rushed to Williams' aide, removing his teammate's helmet and clearing his airway after he had swallowed his tongue, thus preventing further injury.

Sheene then clinched the World Championship by winning the Swedish Grand Prix with three races left in the championship. He claimed the title with 136 points, 81 points more than second-placed Länsivuori. Sheene was the first 500cc champion from the Japanese marque, and remains the only person to win more than one World Championship on a Suzuki motorcycle. Without any major factory teams in the championship, the customer version of the RG500 dominated the standings.

=== 1977: Repeat champion ===
Williams was replaced on the Suzuki team by rising talent, 23-year-old Pat Hennen, the first American rider to win a 500cc Grand Prix. Recognizing the threat that Hennen posed to his position at the top of the team's hierarchy, Sheene would employ the same psychological tactics on Hennen that he had used on Williams, publicly disparaging his new American teammate by telling journalists, “If you pay peanuts, you get a monkey.” Hennen was joined on the Suzuki team by Steve Parrish, who rode Sheene's 1976 Suzuki 500cc machine.

Sheene was once again the top British points scorer at the 1977 Transatlantic Match races, however Suzuki lacked a 750cc motorcycle to compete with the dominant Yamaha TZ750 and Roberts won the first four races of the series before his motorcycle failed during the first race at Oulton Park allowing Sheene to claim the victory. The top American points scorer at the Match races was Sheene's Suzuki teammate, Hennen, serving notice that he would be a contender in the coming 500cc World Championship.

Sheene was even more dominant in the 1977 season facing off against a revived Yamaha factory effort supporting Giacomo Agostini, Johnny Cecotto and Steve Baker. He claimed the World Championship with six Grand Prix victories, finishing well clear of second placed Baker. His victory in the 1977 Belgian Grand Prix marked the fastest Grand Prix in history with an average race speed of 135.067 mph (217.369 kph). The following year, the Spa-Francorchamps road course was replaced by a shorter, safer track, meaning that Sheene's record could never be broken.

Sheene's campaign for increased rider safety was galvanized at the second round of the 1977 season held at the Salzburgring circuit, when an accident during the 350cc race killed Hans Stadelmann and left Johnny Cecotto, Dieter Braun and Patrick Fernandez with serious injuries. The lack of onsite medical facilities exacerbated the situation and exposed the race organizers' callousness and indifference regarding the safety of competitors. Sheene and most other 500 class riders refused to race, despite the race organizers offering riders double the usual start money. For his efforts, the FIM race jury issued official warnings to Sheene and other riders.

Although Sheene sought a psychological advantage over his rivals, he could also be generous as he was with Steve Baker who had been released by Yamaha after placing second to Sheene in the 1977 500cc World Championship. Baker was determined to stay and compete in Europe, and with the help of Sheene, he was able to secure a motorcycle and sponsorship from the Suzuki of Italy racing team operated by former Grand Prix competitor, Roberto Gallina.

=== 1978: The American wave ===
There was a sense of anticipation before the start of the 1978 Grand Prix season. Sheene's popularity had boosted the appeal of motorcycle racing beyond the specialty motorcycle press and into the realm of the mass media. He was the first motorcycle racer to gain commercial endorsements from outside the sport, including television advertisements for Brut cologne. Sheene's popularity helped attract renewed interest to Grand Prix motorcycle racing which had stagnated under the dominance of the MV Agusta team led by multi-time world champion Agostini. The Japanese manufacturers were also showing a renewed vigor to compete and the arrival of American champion Kenny Roberts had injected some much-needed interest back into the sport, boosting track attendance and spurring greater television coverage.

Roberts considered himself primarily a dirt track racer and only participated in American road racing events because they were on the AMA Grand National Championship schedule. He had only transferred to competing in the World Championships because Yamaha lacked a competitive dirt track motorcycle to challenge the dominant Harley-Davidson dirt track team. Roberts said that he was initially indifferent about competing in Europe. However, after reading a guest column written by Sheene in the Motor-Cycle News in which he dismissed Roberts as being, "No threat", citing the Yamaha rider's lack of familiarity with most of the European race circuits, the American rider made up his mind to compete. Sheene and Roberts had a fierce rivalry on and off the track, but they also respected each other as competitors.

Roberts brought a new style of riding, forged on the dirt track ovals of America that would revolutionize road racing. His riding style was reminiscent of dirt track riding, where sliding the rear tire to one side is used as a method to steer the motorcycle around a corner. Sheene was the last exponent of the smooth, European riding style which emphasized maintaining as much corner speed as possible without sliding the rear tire. After Roberts, the world championships became dominated by a string of American and Australian riders bred on dirt track racing.

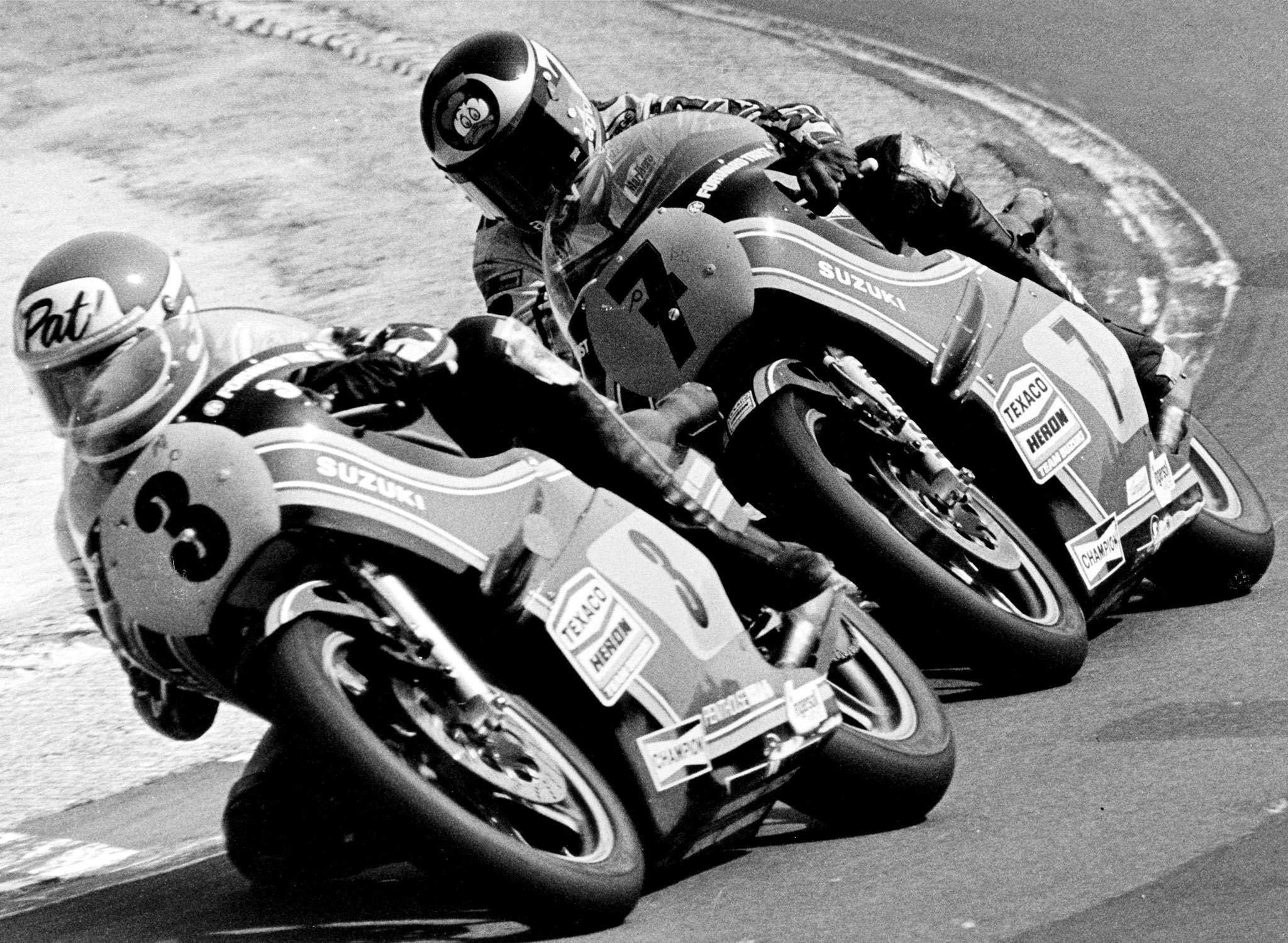
Sheene (7) pursuing teammate Pat Hennen (3) in 1978

At the pre-season 1978 Transatlantic Trophy match races, Sheene won the first of two races at Brands Hatch, but in the second race, Hennen was able to pass Sheene on the inside of the final corner to win the race. Sheene was angered by what he perceived as a dangerous pass and publicly berated his Suzuki teammate. Hennen was the top points scorer at the 1978 Transatlantic Match races, winning three races as well as two second places and one third place. Later in the week, Sheene continued the psychological warfare on his teammate when he repeated the accusation of dangerous riding in his guest column in Motor-Cycle News.

Suzuki produced a new version of the RG500 with a shortened frame for the 1978 season, and although Sheene began the year on a positive note with a victory at the 1978 Venezuelan Grand Prix, the new version proved to be a setback for the RG500's development. Hennen won the Spanish Grand Prix then Roberts won three races in succession. After the first five races, Sheene trailed Roberts by eight points and his Suzuki teammate, Hennen, by five points. During a mid-season break in the Grand Prix schedule, Hennen suffered career-ending injuries while competing in the 1978 Isle of Man TT races.

The Suzuki factory contracted Dutch rider Wil Hartog to replace Hennen on the team, ostensibly to help Sheene fend off the Yamahas of Roberts and Cecotto, however Sheene was unhappy when his new teammate won the 1978 Belgian Grand Prix ahead of Roberts and Sheene in second and third places. Hartog had made the correct tyre choice for the deteriorating weather conditions and was able to win by a 16-second margin. Sheene fought back with a string of podium finishes and with a victory at the Swedish Grand Prix, he had cut Roberts' points lead to three points with three rounds left in the championship.

It was at this crucial point in the championship that Sheene's relationship with Suzuki began to sour. At the Finnish Grand Prix, Sheene had an opportunity to overtake Roberts in the points lead when the Yamaha rider failed to finish the race due to a mechanical failure, however Sheene's Suzuki also failed allowing his teammate Hartog to win his second race of the year. During a pre-race practice session, Sheene's well-trained ear thought he heard a failing crankshaft bearing in his engine. He requested that it be replaced, but his Suzuki mechanics disagreed with his assessment and refused his request. When the crankshaft failed during the race, the outspoken Sheene publicly criticised his team's decision.

The 1978 British Grand Prix ended in controversy when torrential rains during the race, along with pit stops for tyre changes by both Roberts and Sheene, created confusion among official scorers. After Sheene took to the public address system during the confusion to declare that he had won the race, an FIM jury declared that Roberts was the winner with Sheene being awarded third place behind privateer Steve Manship, who did not stop for a tyre change. At the final round in Germany, Roberts finished third ahead of Sheene in fourth place to claim the 500cc title, dropping Sheene to second place in the world rankings. Sheene blamed the loss of the 1978 World Championship on his team's sluggish response to his request in Finland. He won his third Mallory Park Race of the Year in 1978.

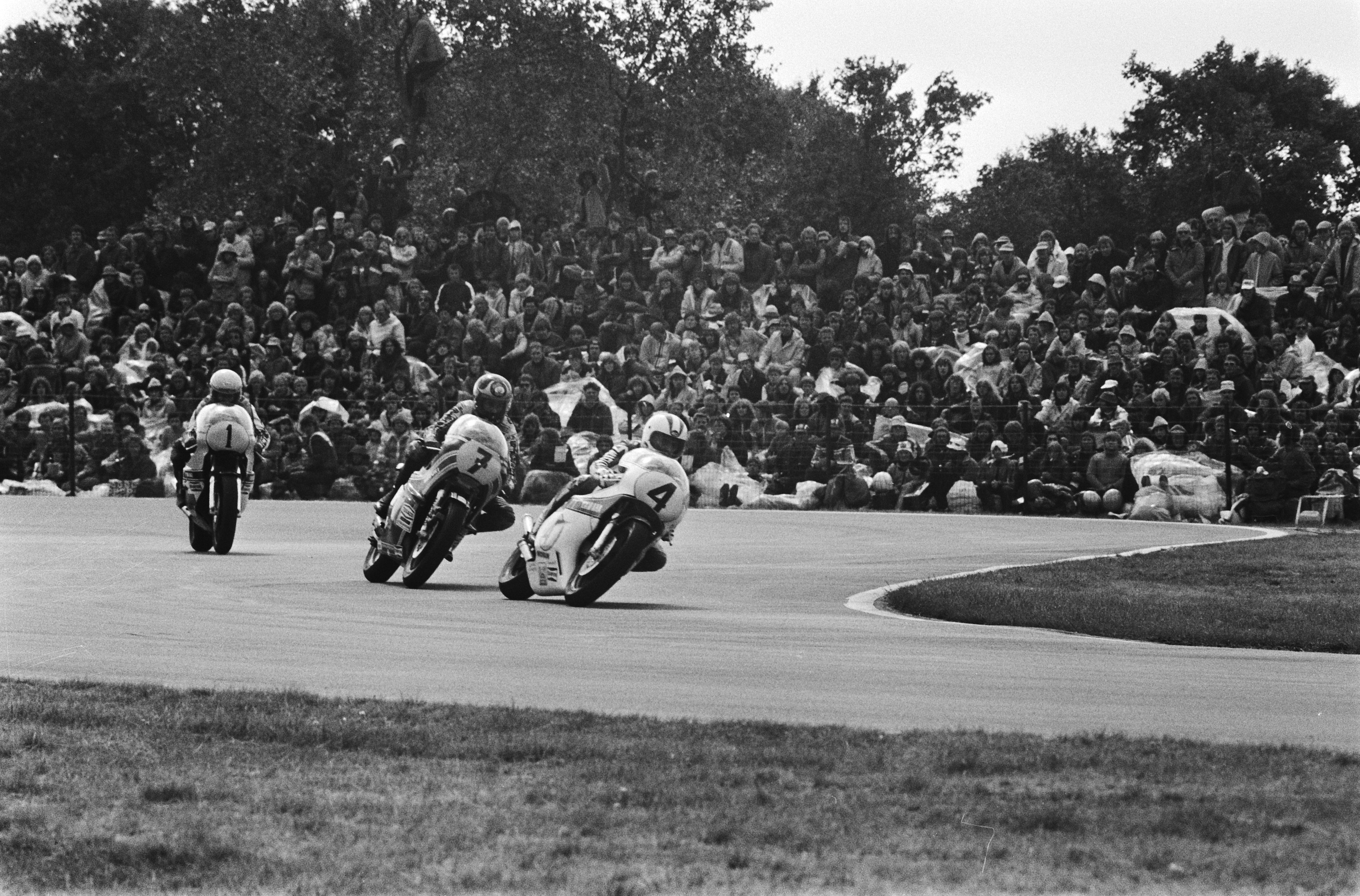
Johnny Cecotto (4) leads Sheene (7) and Kenny Roberts (1) during the 1978 500cc Dutch TT race

=== 1979: Final year with Heron-Suzuki ===
Sheene's relationship with Suzuki was further soured before the 1979 season, when the Suzuki factory asked its three top riders, Sheene, Virginio Ferrari, and Wil Hartog to choose the new factory race bike by comparing two versions. Sheene, used to receiving preferential treatment from Suzuki, was outvoted when Ferrari and Hartog chose the motorcycle that he had rejected, and he was forced to ride their choice rather than his preferred choice.

The 1979 Transatlantic Trophy match races saw Sheene claim the first four races of the series against a depleted American team that was missing Roberts and Hennen due to injuries. Sheene's motorcycle suffered engine problems at Oulton Park allowing Gene Romero to win the final two races of the series.

Sheene began the 1979 season with a victory over teammate Ferrari at the Venezuelan Grand Prix, while Roberts was recovering from career-threatening back injuries suffered during a pre-season testing crash in Japan. Roberts returned to win the second round in Austria despite still recovering from his injuries, while Sheene suffered from a mechanic's mistake when installing his brake pads, causing him to finish in 12th place. He then failed to finish in three of the next four races as Roberts won three consecutive races in Italy, Spain and Yugoslavia to take the championship points lead. Sheene placed second to Ferrari at the Dutch TT before all the factory teams boycotted the Belgian Grand Prix due to the dangerous track conditions. He then won the Swedish Grand Prix followed by a third place in Finland.

Sheene's battle with Kenny Roberts at the 1979 British Grand Prix at Silverstone has been cited as one of the greatest motorcycle Grand Prix races of the 1970s. The race began with Roberts, Sheene and Wil Hartog breaking away from the rest of the field of riders. Hartog eventually fell behind as Roberts and Sheene continued to battle for the lead. The event featured numerous lead changes throughout the 28 lap race. Heading into the final lap of the race, the two leaders came upon lapped riders. Roberts was unhindered as he passed the slower riders, and Sheene was momentarily held up, allowing Roberts to increase his lead. An undeterred Sheene put in an impressive lap time to catch Roberts as they entered the final corner. With momentum on his side, Sheene attempted a last second pass, but Roberts was able to prevail over Sheene by a narrow margin of just three-tenths of a second. The hard-fought race, which was broadcast live by the BBC, cemented the fierce rivalry between the two competitors in the annals of motorcycle Grand Prix racing history. Years later, when informed of Sheene's death from cancer in 2003, Roberts simply stated, "I wouldn't be Kenny Roberts without Barry Sheene".

Sheene recovered to win the final race of the season at the French Grand Prix, but Roberts placed third to secure his second consecutive 500cc World Championship. Despite winning more races than any other Suzuki rider in 1979, Sheene finished the season in third place, two points behind Ferrari on the Gallina-Suzuki.

=== Riders' revolt ===
During the 1979 season, the riders boycott of the 1979 Belgian Grand Prix highlighted the increasing animosity between motorcycle racers and the FIM concerning rider safety. The Belgian circuit had been paved just days before the race, creating a track that many of the racers felt was unsafe due to diesel fuel seeping to the surface. Roberts began talking to journalists about forming a rival racing series to compete against the FIM's monopoly. At the end of the 1979 season, Sheene joined Roberts and British motorsports journalist Barry Coleman, in announcing their intention to break away from the FIM and create a rival race series called the World Series, with most of the top Grand Prix racers joining the revolt.

The death of Gilberto Parlotti at the 1972 Isle of Man TT and the deaths of Jarno Saarinen and Renzo Pasolini in 1973 highlighted the need for improved safety standards for motorcycle racers. At the time, many motorcycle Grand Prix races were still being held on street circuits with hazards such as telephone poles and railroad crossings. Dedicated race tracks of the time were also dangerous for motorcycle racers due to the steel Armco trackside barriers preferred by car racers. Tensions between the Grand Prix racers, race organizers and the FIM over safety issues continued to simmer throughout the 1970s. Riders showed their increasing dissatisfaction with the safety standards and the way races were organized by boycotting several Grand Prix races.

Although the competing series was not successful due to difficulties in securing enough venues, it forced the FIM to take the riders' demands seriously and make changes regarding their safety. During the 1979 FIM Congress, new rules were passed substantially increasing prize money and in subsequent years, stricter safety regulations were imposed on race organizers.

=== Move to Yamaha ===
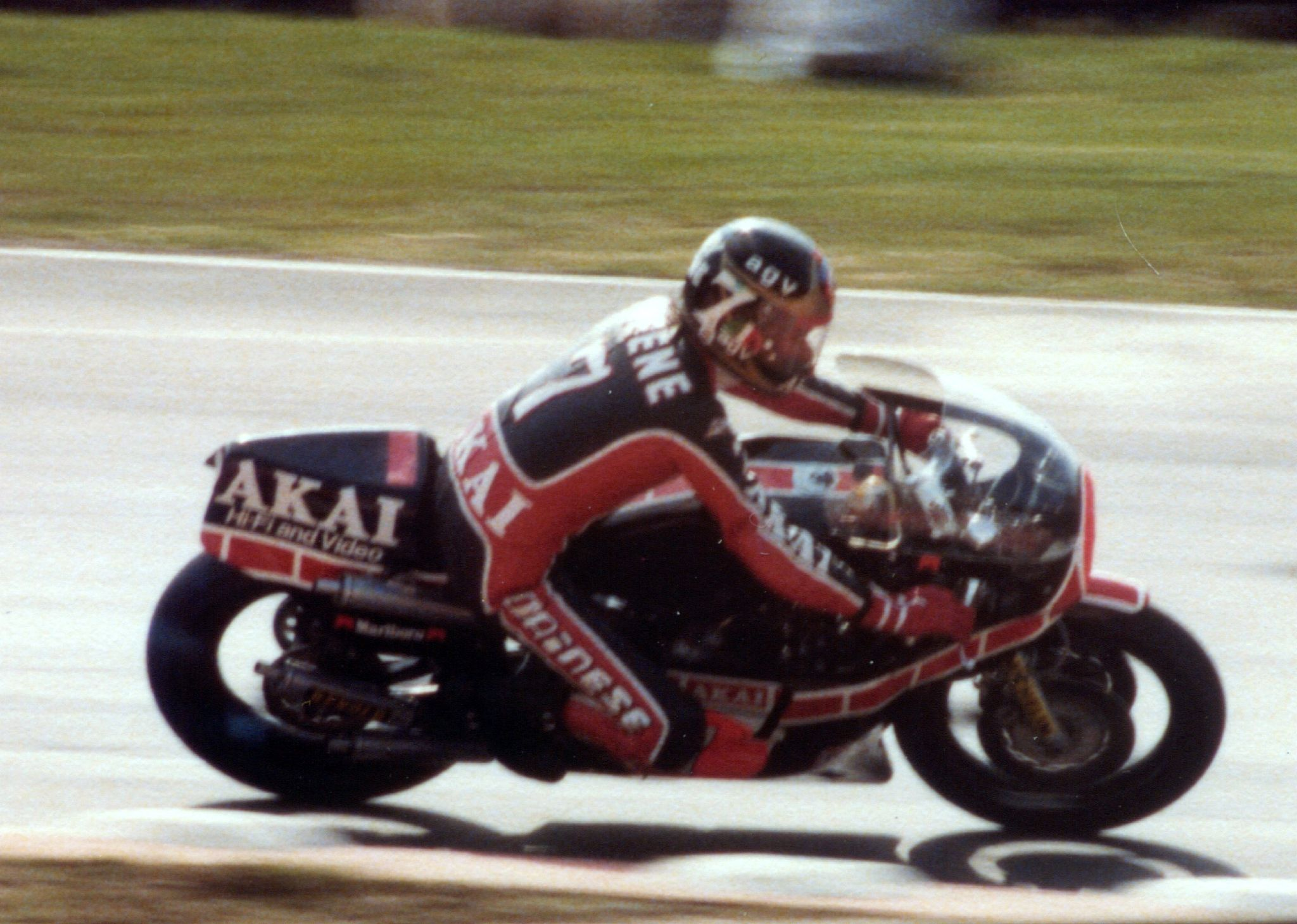
Sheene on the 1980 Akai Yamaha

Believing that he was receiving inferior equipment to his Suzuki teammates, Sheene made the decision to switch manufacturers for the 1980 season. He campaigned on a privateer Yamaha YZR500, but Yamaha remembered his outspoken criticism of their motorcycle in 1972 and withheld their best machinery for Kenny Roberts who captured his third consecutive 500cc World Championship in 1980.

With the help of the British Yamaha importer Mitsui-Yamaha, Sheene began receiving more favorable treatment from the Yamaha factory. In 1981, Sheene retained the services of the recently retired Gary Nixon's former mechanic, Erv Kanemoto, who helped Sheene score two podium results before winning the final round of the series at the Anderstorp Raceway in Sweden, taking fourth overall in the 1981 500cc World Championship. Gallina-Suzuki's Marco Lucchinelli took command of the season with four victories in five races to claim the world championship ahead of Sheene's replacement on the Heron-Suzuki team, Randy Mamola. Sheene's victory at the 1981 Swedish Grand Prix would be the last Grand Prix victory by a British competitor for 35 years, until Cal Crutchlow ended the streak by winning the 2016 Czech Republic Grand Prix.

If Barry had stayed with Suzuki, he would definitely have won more championships.

— Three-time 500cc World Champion Kenny Roberts

Sheene received the latest Yamaha OW60 TZ500 motorcycle before the 1982 season, on par with Roberts' machinery and showed he was back on form by claiming five out of six races at the 1982 Transatlantic Trophy match races, although the American team had been depleted by the absence of Roberts and Randy Mamola due to testing commitments. Then American newcomer Freddie Spencer crashed and damaged his Honda so badly in the first race that he had to abandon the remainder of the series. Only a low-speed crash on the last lap at the Mallory Park hairpin turn allowed Roger Marshall to pass and deprive Sheene of a $40,000 bonus for being the first competitor to win all six races in one year.

=== Silverstone accident ===
With Yamaha's top machinery for the 1982 season, Sheene was immediately competitive, finishing just 0.670 seconds behind Roberts at the Argentine Grand Prix followed by a second place behind Franco Uncini on the Gallina-Suzuki RG500 at the Austrian Grand Prix. After the top riders boycotted the French Grand Prix, he produced a string of podium positions and was in contention for the world championship once again, when he suffered the second serious accident of his career during practice for the 1982 British Grand Prix. During unofficial practice on Thursday at the Silverstone Circuit, Sheene came over a blind rise and collided with Patrick Igoa's motorcycle at over 160 mph, shattering both legs and breaking an arm.

Sheene's injured legs were saved by orthopaedic surgeon Mr Nigel John Cobb FRCS at the nearby Northampton General Hospital. Although he would return to the world championships in 1983 racing a privateer Suzuki RG500, he never regained his old form and he retired in 1984. Fittingly for a rider whose name had become synonymous with the Suzuki RG500, after having scored the motorcycle's first podium position in 1974, he was also the rider who secured its final podium with a third-place result at the 1984 South African motorcycle Grand Prix. He remains the only rider to win Grand Prix races in the 50 cc and 500 cc categories.

The final major victory of Sheene's motorcycle racing career came at the 1984 Scarborough Gold Cup held at the Oliver's Mount circuit, one of his favorite venues. He took the victory over his old foe, Mick Grant marking the fourth time he had won the Scarborough Gold Cup race.

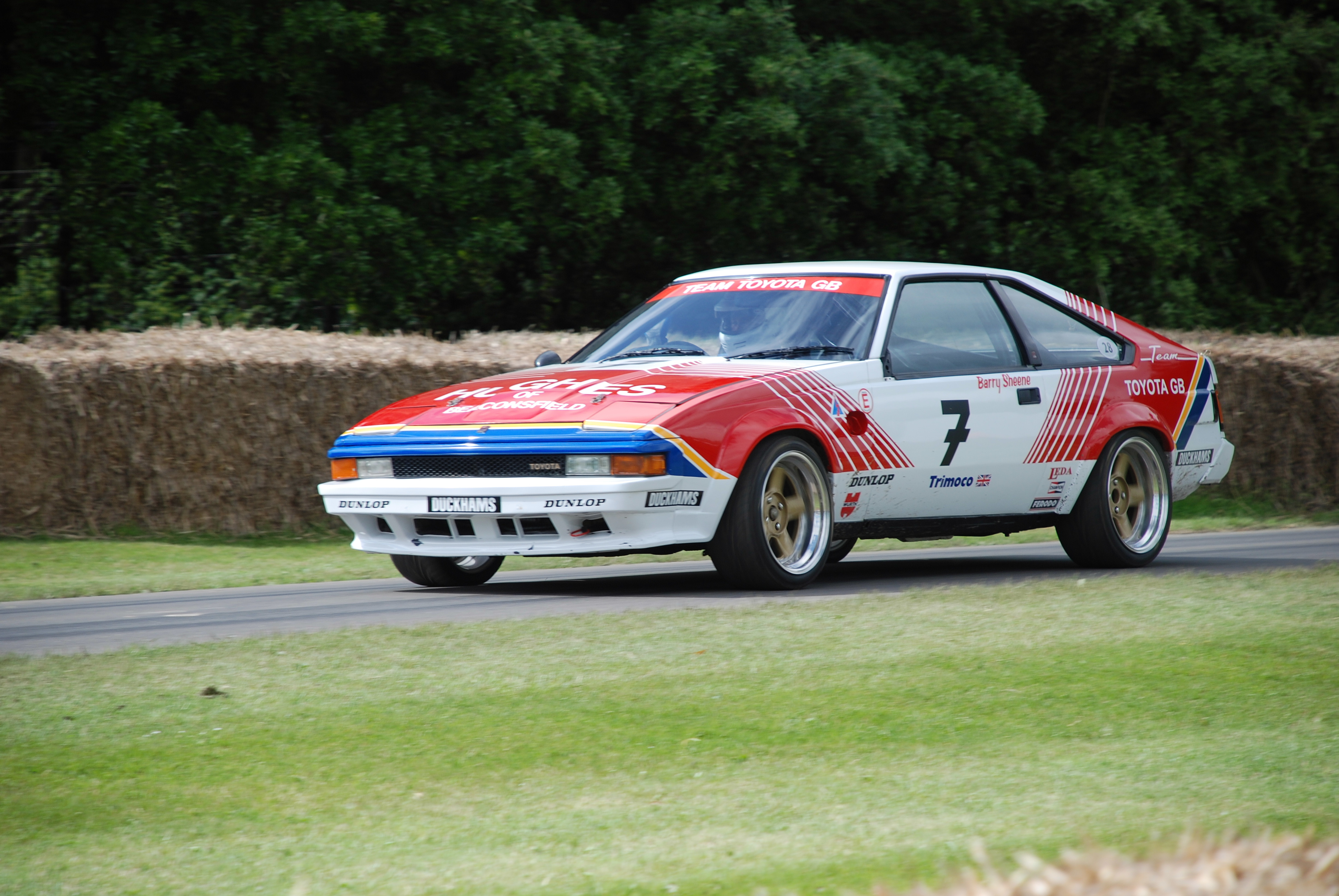
Barry Sheene's Team Toyota GB-entered Toyota Supra from the 1985 British Saloon Car Championship at the 2016 Goodwood Festival of Speed

== Television career ==
Sheene worked as a television presenter, including the ITV series Just Amazing!, where he interviewed people who had, through accident or design, achieved feats of daring and survival (including the former RAF air gunner, Nicholas Alkemade, who survived a fall of 18,000 feet without a parachute from a blazing Avro Lancaster bomber over Germany in March 1944). He was the subject of This Is Your Life in 1978 when he was surprised by Eamonn Andrews at a motor racing cycle exhibition in London's Victoria. Sheene and his wife, Stephanie McLean, also starred in the low-budget film Space Riders.

== Later life and death in Australia ==
The Sheene family moved to Australia in the late 1980s, in the hope that the warmer climate would help relieve some of the pain of Sheene's injury-induced arthritis, settling in a property near the Gold Coast. He combined a property development business with a role as a commentator on motor sport. He began on SBS TV then moved to the Nine Network with Darrell Eastlake, and finally followed the TV broadcast rights of the Grand Prix motorcycle series to Network Ten. Further to this, on Network Ten Sheene co-hosted the weekly motor sport television show RPM from 1997 to 2002 with journalists Bill Woods and Greg Rust and was involved in Ten's coverage of other motor sport including V8 Supercars for several years. In the 1990s, Sheene appeared in a series of well-known and popular television advertisements for Shell, with Australian motor sport icon Dick Johnson.

With his personal connections in the motorcycle industry, Sheene helped boost the racing careers of young Australian motorcycle racers such as five-time 500cc World Champion, Mick Doohan, two-time Superbike World Champion, Troy Corser and MotoGP Grand Prix winner, Chris Vermeulen. In later years, Sheene became involved in historic motorcycle racing, often returning to England to race at Donington Park. Sheene competed in his last race in Britain at the Goodwood Revival in 2002. He was also chosen to run with the Queen's Baton in the run-up to the 2002 Commonwealth Games held in Manchester, England.

In July 2002, at the age of 51, Sheene was diagnosed with cancer of the oesophagus and stomach. Refusing conventional treatments involving chemotherapy, Sheene instead opted for a holistic approach involving a strict diet devised by Austrian healer Rudolf Breuss, intended to starve the cancer of nourishment.

Sheene died at a hospital on Queensland's Gold Coast in March 2003, aged 52, having suffered from the condition for eight months.

== Honours and awards ==
In 1978, Sheene was appointed MBE for services to motorcycle sport. He was a two-time Segrave Trophy recipient in 1977 and 1984 for his career in motorcycle Grand Prix racing. Following reconstruction of the Brands Hatch Circuit in England for safety concerns after requests by the FIM, the Dingle Dell section was changed for safety, and shortly after Sheene's death the new section was renamed Sheene's Corner in his honour. The FIM named him a Grand Prix "Legend" in 2001. For the 2003 season, V8 Supercars introduced a medal in honour of Sheene, the Barry Sheene Medal, for the 'best and fairest' driver of the season. A memorial ride from Bairnsdale to Phillip Island, Victoria is held by Australian motorcyclists annually, before the MotoGP held at the island.

== In popular culture ==
A song titled "Mr. Sheene" that describes "Mr. Sheene's riding machine" was recorded by comedians Eric Idle and Rikki Fataar and released in 1978 as the B-side of the single "Ging Gang Goolie" under the names Dirk and Stig, their characters in Beatles-parody band The Rutles.

In the UK television series Queer as Folk, the main characters Stuart and Vince reminisce about their teenage attraction to a photo of Sheene "On his motorbike! In his leathers..."

In the Sleaford Mods song Dirty Den, the character is mentioned "falling off the wagon like Barry Sheene".

== Career statistics ==
The following is a list of results achieved by Sheene.

=== Motorcycle Grand Prix results ===
**Position**	1	2	3	4	5	6	7	8	9	10
**Points**	15	12	10	8	6	5	4	3	2	1

(key) (Races in bold indicate pole position; races in italics indicate fastest lap)

Year	Class	Team	Machine	1	2	3	4	5	6	7	8	9	10	11	12	13	Points	Rank	Wins
1970	125cc	Sheene	Suzuki RT67	GER -	FRA -	YUG -	IOM -	NED -	BEL -	DDR -	CZE -	FIN -	ULS -	NAT -	ESP; 2		12	13th	0
1971	50cc	Kreidler	Kreidler 50	AUT -	GER -		NED -	BEL -	DDR -	CZE; 1	SWE; 4			NAT -	ESP -		23	6th	1
1971	125cc	Sheene	Suzuki RT67	AUT; 3	GER -	IOM; DNF	NED; 2	BEL; 1	DDR; 2	CZE; 3	SWE; 1	FIN; 1		NAT; 3	ESP; 3		79	**2nd**	3
1971	250cc	Derbi	Derbi 250	AUT -	GER -	IOM -	NED -	BEL -	DDR; 6	CZE -	SWE -	FIN -	ULS -	NAT -	ESP -		5	33rd	0
1972	250cc	Sheene	Yamaha TD-3 (YZ635)	GER -	FRA -	AUT; 4	NAT -	IOM -	YUG -	NED -	BEL -	DDR -	CZE -	SWE -	FIN -	ESP; 3	18	13th	0
1973	Formula 750	Suzuki	TR750	ITA -	FRA; 1	SWE; 3	FIN; 2	GBR; DSQ	GER; 2	ESP; 2							61	1st	1
1974	500cc	Suzuki	RG500	FRA; 2	GER -	AUT; 3	NAT -	IOM -	NED -	BEL -	SWE -	FIN -	CZE; 4				30	6th	0
1975	500cc	Suzuki	RG500	FRA -	AUT -	GER -	NAT -	IOM -	**NED**; 1	**BEL**; DNF	**SWE**; 1	FIN -	CZE; DNF				30	6th	2
1975	Formula 750	Suzuki	TR750	USA -	ITA -	BEL -	FRA; 1	SWE; 1	FIN -	UK; 1	NED -	GER -					45	**2nd**	3
1976	500cc	Heron-Suzuki	RG500	**FRA**; 1	**AUT**; 1	NAT; 1	IOM -	**NED**; 1	**BEL**; 2	SWE; 1	FIN -	CZE -	GER -				72	**1st**	5
1977	500cc	Heron-Suzuki	RG500	VEN; 1	AUT -	**GER**; 1	**NAT**; 1	FRA; 1	**NED**; 2	BEL; 1	**SWE**; 1	**FIN**; 6	CZE -	**GBR**; NC			107	**1st**	6
1978	500cc	Heron-Suzuki	RG500	VEN; 1	ESP; 5	AUT; 3	FRA; 3	NAT; 5	NED; 3	BEL; 3	SWE; 1	FIN; NC	GBR; 3	GER; 4			100	**2nd**	2
1979	500cc	Heron-Suzuki	RG500	**VEN**; 1	AUT; 12	**GER**; NC	**NAT**; 4	ESP; NC	YUG; NC	NED; 2	BEL; DNS	SWE; 1	FIN; 3	GBR; 2	FRA; 1		87	**3rd**	3
1980	500cc	Akai-Yamaha	YZR500 (OW48)	NAT; 7	ESP; 5	FRA; NC	NED; NC	BEL -	FIN -	GBR; NC	GER -						10	15th	0
1981	500cc	Akai-Yamaha	YZR500 (OW54)	AUT; 4	GER; 6	NAT; 3	FRA; 4	YUG; 5	NED; NC	BEL; 4	RSM; 2	GBR; NC	FIN; NC	**SWE**; 1			72	4th	1
1982	500cc	JPS-Yamaha	YZR500 (OW60)	ARG; 2	AUT; 2	FRA -	ESP; 2	NAT -	NED; 3	BEL; 2	**YUG**; 3	GBR; DNS	SWE; DNS	RSM; DNS	GER; DNS		68	5th	0
1983	500cc	HB-Suzuki	RG500	RSA; 10	FRA; 7	NAT; 9	GER; NC	ESP -	AUT; 13	YUG; 13	NED; NC	BEL -	GBR; 9	SWE; NC	RSM; NC		9	14th	0
1984	500cc	HB-Suzuki	RG500	RSA; 3	NAT; NC	ESP; 7	AUT; 10	GER; 10	FRA; 5	YUG; 7	NED; NC	BEL; 9	GBR; 5	SWE; NC	RSM; NC		34	6th	0

=== Complete British Saloon Car Championship results ===
(key) (Races in bold indicate pole position; races in italics indicate fastest lap.)

Year	Team	Car	Class	1	2	3	4	5	6	7	8	9	10	11	12	DC	Pts	Class
1981	Mazda Motorsport / TWR	Mazda RX-7	C	MAL; Ret†	SIL	OUL	THR	BRH	SIL	SIL	DON	BRH	THR	SIL		NC	0	NC
1985	Team Toyota GB / Hughes of Beaconsfield	Toyota Celica Supra	A	SIL ovr:5 cls:4	**OUL**; Ret	THR ovr:3 cls:3	DON; Ret	THR; DNS	SIL ovr:3 cls:3	DON ovr:5 cls:4	SIL; Ret	SNE; Ret	BRH ovr:4 cls:4	BRH; DNS	SIL ovr:6 cls:6	16th	18	6th
1986	Team Toyota GB / Duckhams	Toyota Corolla GT	C	SIL	THR	SIL	DON	BRH	SNE	BRH	DON	SIL ovr:11 cls:4				NC	0	NC

† Events with 2 races staged for the different classes.

=== Complete European Touring Car Championship results ===
(key) (Races in bold indicate pole position) (Races in italics indicate fastest lap)

Year	Team	Car	1	2	3	4	5	6	7	8	9	10	11	12	13	14	DC	Pts
1979	(United Kingdom) **The Akai Golf**	Volkswagen Golf GTI	MNZ	VAL	MUG	BRH	JAR	ZEL	BRN	NUR	ZAN	SAL	PER	SIL; Ret	ZOL		NC	0
1985	(Belgium) **Jermaine Jackson / Toyota Racing**	Toyota Celica Supra	MNZ	VAL	DON	AND	BRN	ZEL	SAL	NUR	SPA; Ret	SIL	NOG	ZOL	EST	JAR	NC	0
1986	(United Kingdom) **BBW Turbosport**	Mitsubishi Starion Turbo	MNZ	DON	HOC	MIS	AND	BRN	ZEL	NÜR	SPA	SIL; Ret	NOG	ZOL	JAR	EST	NC	0
