= 1975 Formula 750 season =

1975 Formula 750 Prize

Seasons
- ← 1974 1976 →

The 1975 Formula 750 season was the third season of the FIM Formula 750 Prize. The series consisted of 17 races held at nine events. Jack Findlay won the series although he didn't win any races.

== Calendar ==
1975 Calendar
Round	Race title	Circuit	Date	Heat 1 Winner	Heat 2 Winner	Overall winner
1	34th Daytona 200 ^{1}	(United States) Daytona International Speedway	March 9	(United States) Gene Romero		
2	Imola 200	(Italy) Autodromo Dino Ferrari	April 6	(Venezuela) Johnny Cecotto	(Venezuela) Johnny Cecotto	(Venezuela) Johnny Cecotto
3	Mettet 1000 km	(Belgium) Mettet Circuit	June 15	(France) Patrick Pons	(United Kingdom) Dave Potter	(France) Patrick Pons
4	Championnat du Monde 750	(France) Circuit de Nevers Magny-Cours	June 22	(United Kingdom) Barry Sheene	(United Kingdom) Barry Sheene	(United Kingdom) Barry Sheene
5	Anderstorp	(Sweden) Anderstorp Raceway	July 19	(United Kingdom) Barry Sheene	(United Kingdom) Barry Ditchburn	(United Kingdom) Barry Sheene
6	Hämeenlinna	(Finland) Ahvenisto Race Circuit	August 2–3	(Finland) Tapio Virtanen	(Finland) Tapio Virtanen	(Finland) Tapio Virtanen
7	John Player British Grand Prix	(United Kingdom) Silverstone Grand Prix Circuit	August 10	(Venezuela) Johnny Cecotto	(United Kingdom) Barry Sheene	(United Kingdom) Barry Sheene
8	Champion Assen 200 Miles	(Netherlands) Circuit van Drenthe, Assen	September 7	(Canada) Yvon Duhamel	(Canada) Yvon Duhamel	(Canada) Yvon Duhamel
9	ADAC Preis von Baden-Württemberg und Hessen	(Germany) Hockenheimring	September 26	(France) Patrick Pons	(France) Patrick Pons	(France) Patrick Pons

Notes:

1. - The Daytona 200 was run as a single race rather than the aggregate of two heats that the other races used.

== Points system ==
All events except Daytona consisted of two races and points were awarded by aggregate times of the two:

Position	1	2	3	4	5	6	7	8	9	10
Points	15	12	10	8	6	5	4	3	2	1

Only the five best results achieved by a rider counted towards the championship standings.

== Championship standings ==
Pos	Rider	Bike	DAY (United States)	IMO (Italy)	MET (Belgium)	MAG (France)	AND (Sweden)	AHV (Finland)	SIL (United Kingdom)	ASS (Netherlands)	HOC (Germany)	Points (gross)
1	(Australia) Jack Findlay	Yamaha TZ750	-	5	3	4	-	-	6	2	3	46 (51)
2	(United Kingdom) Barry Sheene	Suzuki TR750	-	-	-	1	1	-	1	-	-	45
3	(France) Patrick Pons	Yamaha	-	2	1	-	-	-	-	-	1	42
4	(France) Christian Bourgeois	Yamaha	-	-	-	3	-	5	-	6	4	29
5	(United Kingdom) John Newbold	Suzuki	-	-	6	5	-	-	-	3	5	27
6	(Venezuela) Johnny Cecotto	Yamaha	3	1	-	-	-	-	-	-	-	25
7	(United States) Steve Baker	Yamaha	2	3	-	-	-	-	-	-	-	22
=	(United Kingdom) Barry Ditchburn	Kawasaki KR750	-	-	-	-	2	-	3	-	-	22
=	(Spain) Víctor Palomo	SMAC-Yamaha	-	-	-	-	3	2	-	-	-	22
=	(Finland) Teuvo Länsivuori	Suzuki	-	-	-	-	-	3	2	-	-	22
11	(Finland) Tapio Virtanen	Yamaha	-	-	-	-	5	1	-	-	-	21
12	(United Kingdom) Chas Mortimer	Yamaha	-	6	4	-	4	-	-	-	-	21
13	(United Kingdom) Dave Potter	Yamaha	-	4	2	-	-	-	-	-	-	20
14	(United Kingdom) John Williams	Yamaha / Suzuki	-	-	-	-	-	-	5	-	2	18
15	(United States) Gene Romero	Yamaha	1	-	-	-	-	-	-	-	-	15
=	(Canada) Yvon Duhamel	Kawasaki	-	-	-	-	-	-	-	1	-	15
17	(France) Christian Estrosi	Yamaha	-	-	-	2	-	-	-	-	-	12
18	(France) Olivier Chevallier	Yamaha	-	-	-	-	8	4	-	-	-	11
19	(Netherlands) Boet van Dulmen	Yamaha	-	-	-	-	-	-	-	5	6	11
20	(France) René Guili	Yamaha	-	-	-	7	6	-	-	-	-	9
21	(Italy) Giacomo Agostini	Yamaha	4	-	-	-	-	-	-	-	-	8
=	(Switzerland) Philippe Coulon	Yamaha	-	-	-	-	-	-	4	-	-	8
=	(United States) Hurley Wilvert	Yamaha	-	-	-	-	-	-	-	4	-	8
24	(Australia) Warren Willing	Yamaha	5	-	-	-	-	-	-	-	-	6
=	(Belgium) Jean-Philippe Orban	Yamaha	-	-	5	-	-	-	-	-	-	6
26	(United States) Steve McLaughlin	Yamaha	6	-	-	-	-	-	-	-	-	5
=	(Monaco) Hubert Rigal	Yamaha	-	-	-	6	-	-	-	-	-	5
=	(United Kingdom) Alex George	Yamaha	-	-	-	-	-	6	-	-	-	5
29	(France) Gérard Choukroun	Yamaha	-	-	-	-	-	-	-	10	7	5
30	(Netherlands) Marcel Ankoné	Yamaha / Suzuki	-	-	-	-	-	-	-	7	8	5
31	(Japan) Hiroyuki Kawasaki	Yamaha	7	-	-	-	-	-	-	-	-	4
=	(United States) Phil McDonald	Yamaha	-	7	-	-	-	-	-	-	-	4
=	(Switzerland) Hans Stadelmann	Yamaha	-	-	7	-	-	-	-	-	-	4
=	(Sweden) Johnny Bengtsson	Yamaha	-	-	-	-	7	-	-	-	-	4
=	(Finland) Ari Heikkila	Yamaha	-	-	-	-	-	7	-	-	-	4
=	(United Kingdom) Pat Mahoney	Yamaha	-	-	-	-	-	-	7	-	-	4
=	(Netherlands) Wil Hartog	Yamaha	-	-	-	-	-	-	-	7	-	4
38	(United Kingdom) Cliff Carr	Yamaha	-	-	8	-	-	-	10	-	-	4
39	(United States) Ron Pierce	Yamaha	8	-	-	-	-	-	-	-	-	3
=	(Italy) Mimmo Cazzaniga	Kawasaki	-	8	-	-	-	-	-	-	-	3
=	(Italy) Guido Mandracci	Suzuki	-	-	-	8	-	-	-	-	-	3
=	(Sweden) Ingemar Larsson	Yamaha	-	-	-	-	-	8	-	-	-	3
=	(United Kingdom) Jim Harvey	Yamaha	-	-	-	-	-	-	8	-	-	3
=	(Switzerland) Ernst Wenger	Yamaha	-	-	-	-	-	-	-	-	8	3
45	(United States) Don Castro	Yamaha	9	-	-	-	-	-	-	-	-	2
=	(Italy) Abbondio Sciaresa	Yamaha	-	9	-	-	-	-	-	-	-	2
=	(Germany) W. Scoch	Yamaha	-	-	9	-	-	-	-	-	-	2
=	(France) Thierry Tchernine	Yamaha	-	-	-	9	-	-	-	-	-	2
=	(Sweden) Carl Ingmar Eckre	Yamaha	-	-	-	-	9	-	-	-	-	2
=	(Belgium) Thierry van der Veken	Yamaha	-	-	-	-	-	9	-	-	-	2
=	(United Kingdom) Paul Smart	Suzuki	-	-	-	-	-	-	9	-	-	2
=	(Netherlands) Rob Bron	Suzuki	-	-	-	-	-	-	-	9	-	2
53	(United States) Harry Cone	Yamaha	10	-	-	-	-	-	-	-	-	1
=	(France) Jean-Paul Boinet	Yamaha	-	10	-	-	-	-	-	-	-	1
=	(Australia) John Dodds	Yamaha	-	-	10	-	-	-	-	-	-	1
=	(France) Hervé Guilleux	Yamaha	-	-	-	10	-	-	-	-	-	1
=	(Denmark) Kjeld Sedendorf	Yamaha	-	-	-	-	10	-	-	-	-	1
=	(Finland) Harry Viiala	Yamaha	-	-	-	-	-	10	-	-	-	1
=	(Germany) Siegfried Güttner	Yamaha	-	-	-	-	-	-	-	-	10	1
Pos	Rider	Bike	DAY (United States)	IMO (Italy)	MET (Belgium)	MAG (France)	AND (Sweden)	AHV (Finland)	SIL (United Kingdom)	ASS (Netherlands)	HOC (Germany)	Points (gross)

Colour	Result
Gold	Winner
Silver	Second place
Bronze	Third place
Green	Points classification
Blue	Non-points classification
Blue	Non-classified finish (NC)
Purple	Retired, not classified (Ret)
Red	Did not qualify (DNQ)
Red	Did not pre-qualify (DNPQ)
Black	Disqualified (DSQ)
White	Did not start (DNS)
White	Withdrew (WD)
White	Race cancelled (C)
Blank	Did not practice (DNP)
Blank	Did not arrive (DNA)
Blank	Excluded (EX)

== See also ==
- 1975 Grand Prix motorcycle racing season
