= Space Riders =

- Directed by: Joe Massot
- Screenplay by: Felicity Hibberdine
- Story by: Felicity Hibberdine; Joe Massot
- Produced by: Felicity Hibberdine
- Starring: Barry Sheene; Gavan O'Herlihy; Toshiya Ito; Stephanie McLean; Sayo Inaba; Caroline Evans; Jeff Harding; Marina Sirtis
- Cinematography: Alec Mills
- Edited by: John Foster
- Production company: Condor Film Productions
- Distributed by: Columbia-EMI-Warner
- Release date: 1984 (UK)
- Running time: 99 minutes
- Country: United Kingdom
- Languages: English; Italian; Japanese

Space Riders is a 1984 British sports drama film directed by Joe Massot. It stars Grand Prix motorcycle racing world champion Barry Sheene as himself. It tells the story of Sheene's pursuit of the world title, including his recovery from a near-fatal accident at Silverstone.

== Plot ==
The film begins with Barry having a bad crash during the 1982 British Grand Prix. Suzuki rider Anton Mang crashes and Barry crashes into his bike. Barry is then hit by Honda rider Takazumi Katayama. One year later, chairman Asama Nakamura of Asama Motorbikes decides to hire the three fastest riders in the world to race for them. He ends up hiring Barry, American Ron Harris, who won the '82 title after Barry crashed, and Japanese rider Masao Yamashta.

Leading up to the race, Masao practices Japanese stick fighting and talks to his wife Mika. Ron rides on his 1983 Honda VF750F and meets a girl driving a 1978 Porsche 911 SC Targa. The two end up dating for about a week until she friend zones him. Some time later, the British Grand Prix begins and Barry ends up winning ahead of Ron and his archenemy Mike Lockwood. Soon the sidecar race begins, and Mika and her passenger Bruce win. Some time later, the South African Grand Prix begins. Masao wins ahead of Lockwood and Ron, with Barry dropping out after his bike has Ignition trouble. As time passes, Barry wins Brazil, Ron wins Spain and the Daytona 200, Lockwood wins Germany, Masao wins France, Ron wins the Dutch Grand Prix, Lockwood beats Masao in a photo finish at Sweden after Barry drops out after his transmission seizes, and Lockwood wins at Italy after Barry crashes.

Masao finds out there will only be two bikes for next season. In a desperate attempt to renew his contract, he wins Argentina and Venezuela. Masao takes the lead in Yugoslavia until he has visions of the devil on Lockwood's bike. His life flashes before his eyes, causing him to become airborne and his bike to explode. He goes flying through the air on fire and dies. After his wife Mika deals with the crash by doing wheelies up and down the pit lane while sobbing uncontrollably, the San Marino Grand Prix begins. Barry wins with Ron second and Lockwood dropping out after his bike throws a Connecting rod. Barry and Ron celebrate on the podium drinking champagne, and Barry is interviewed about his win by ABC Sports.

== Cast ==
- Barry Sheene as Himself
- Gavan O'Herlihy as Ron Harris
- Toshiya Ito as Masao Yamashta
- Stephanie McLean as Herself
- Sayo Inaba as Mika Yamashta
- Caroline Evans as Joanne
- Jeff Harding as Mike Lockwood
- Marina Sirtis as Girl In Porsche
- Hiroshi Kato as Chairman
- Three Japanese Executives
  - Akira
  - Isamu
  - Sakamoto
- Two Japanese Secretaries
  - Maria
  - Yuriko
- Nightclub Fight Scene Singers
  - Geraldine
  - Maureen
  - Teresa
- Steve Parrish as Devil Rider
- Ken Fletcher as Barry's Mechanic
- Andrew Marriot as Commentator
- Roald Knutsen as Kendo Master
- Stunt riders
  - Stu Avant
  - Wayne Gardner
  - Chris Guy
  - Ron Haslam
  - Steve Henshaw
  - Keith Huewen
  - Paul Lewis
  - Rob McElnea
  - Roger Marshall
  - Steve Parrish
  - Mark Salle
  - Franco Uncini
  - Boet van Dulmen
  - Loris Reggiani
  - Freddie Spencer
  - Marco Lucchinelli
  - Takazumi Katayama
  - Kenny Roberts
  - Carlos Lavado
  - Eddie Lawson
  - Randy Mamola
  - Anton Mang
  - Barry Sheene
  - Terry Haslam (Bruce)

== Production ==
A re-enactment of the accident is the opening scene of the movie. Despite his position atop the marquee, Sheene does not appear in about 80% of the film's footage.

Much of the filming of the race sequences with Barry Sheene took place at Donington Park race circuit close to East Midlands Airport. Many of the stunts were arranged by Stunt coordinator Roy Alon.

== Soundtrack ==
The film uses hit songs from the era as narration; songs such as "Don't Stop Me Now" by Queen, "Glittering Prize" by Simple Minds, "Hungry Like the Wolf" by Duran Duran, "Love Comin' At Ya" by Melba Moore, "Outside" by The Fixx, "Reggae High" by The Dub Band, and "We Can Work It Out" by Brass Construction are used to add to the mood.

== Home media ==
Space Riders was released on VHS. As of 2025, it has not been released on DVD or Blu-ray.

== See also ==
- Silver Dream Racer
