= Stephanie McLean =

Stephanie McLean may refer to:

- Stephanie McLean (politician) (fl. 2010s–2020s), politician elected to the Alberta Legislative Assembly in 2015
- Stephanie McLean (model) (fl. 1970s–2000s), British model in the 1970s
