= 1971 Isle of Man TT =

Annual motorcycle racing event

The 1971 Isle of Man TT was a motorcycle event held on 12 June 1971, on the 37-mile Snaefell Mountain course on the Isle of Man between Great Britain and Ireland. It was the third round of the F.I.M. 1971 Grand Prix motorcycle racing season (now MotoGP).

The unbelievable happened in 1971 - Agostini's MV broke down on the first lap of the Junior. The crowd cheered when it was announced that the Italian had stopped at Ramsey with engine problems. His demise produced a dramatic race in which many of the favourites either crashed or broke down.

Yamaha's Phil Read led Alan Barnett, Rod Gould and Dudley Robinson at the end of the first lap. Gould then crashed at Quarterbridge, but continued. On lap three Barnett came off at Glen Helen, and a lap later Read retired with chassis problems. With one lap to go Robinson led Yorkshireman Tony Jefferies, riding a Yamsel, but he crashed at Rhencullen, so Jefferies came home with 37 seconds to spare from newcomers Gordon Pantall, with Bill Smith third.

Agostini had no such problems in the Senior, which was postponed by a day because of bad weather. Despite spending nearly two minutes in the pits to rectify carburation problems, he won comfortably from Peter Williams (Arter Matchless) and Frank Perris on a Suzuki.

The Yamaha twins dominated the 250cc race, which was reduced to four laps. Phil Read led all the way when his main challenger Peter Williams's MZ expired at the end of the first lap. Barry Randle and Alan Barnett completed a Yamaha clean sweep.

Barry Sheene made his one and only TT appearance in the 125cc race, (Sheene also competed in the 250cc Production race on a Crooks Suzuki) but slipped off his Suzuki at Quarterbridge on the second lap while lying second in appalling conditions. The race was won by Chas Mortimer, riding a Yamaha, at the slowest 125cc average on the Mountain Course since 1953.

A new three-lap Formula 750 race was introduced to provide a class to accommodate the popular British 750cc racing machines. Tony Jefferies led throughout on a works Triumph after a splendid battle with the BSA of Ray Pickrell and the Norton of Peter Williams.

Pickrell gained revenge in the 750cc class of the Production race. Riding a Triumph, he was involved in a tremendous duel with Williams until the Norton stopped on the third lap at the Bungalow. Pickrell was a comfortable winner from Jefferies and the BSA of Bob Heath. John Williams and Bill Smith brought Honda success in both the 500 and 250cc classes with dominant victories.

Siggi Schauzu won his fifth TT after a superb duel with BMW teammate George Auerbacher in the World Championship sidecar race. Earlier in the week Auerbacher had secured his first TT victory in the 750cc sidecar event after ten years of trying. Schauzu broke the lap record from a standing start but dropped out on the second lap.

== 1971 Isle of Man Lightweight TT 125cc final standings ==
3 Laps (113.00 Miles) Mountain Course.

Place	Rider	Number	Country	Machine	Speed	Time	Points
1	(United Kingdom) Chas Mortimer		United Kingdom	Yamaha	83.91 mph	1:20.54.0	15
2	(Sweden) Börje Jansson		Sweden	Maico	81.83 mph	1:23.43.6	12
3	(United Kingdom) John Kiddie		United Kingdom	Honda	76.14 mph	1:29.12.2	10
4	(United Kingdom) Peter Courtney		United Kingdom	Yamaha	75.92 mph	1:29.28.2	8
5	(United Kingdom) Nev Watts		United Kingdom	Honda	75.70 mph	1:29.43.6	6
6	(United Kingdom) C.Ward		United Kingdom	Maico	74.14 mph	1:30.23.6	5
7	(United Kingdom) F.C. Smart		United Kingdom	Honda	74.96 mph	1.30.36.6	4
8	(United Kingdom) Lindsay Porter		United Kingdom	Honda	73.99 mph	1.31.48.2	3
9	(United Kingdom) Bill Rae		United Kingdom	Maico	73.19 mph	1.32.48.4	2
10	(United Kingdom) John Pearson		United Kingdom	Bultaco	72.97 mph	1.33.05.0	1
DNF	(United Kingdom) Barry Sheene		United Kingdom	Suzuki			

== 1971 Isle of Man Lightweight TT 250cc final standings ==
4 Laps (150.92 Miles) Mountain Course.

Place	Rider	Number	Country	Machine	Speed	Time	Points
1	(United Kingdom) Phil Read		Britain	Yamaha	98.02 mph	1:32.23.3	15
2	(United Kingdom) Barry Randle		Britain	Yamaha	93.75 mph	1:34.27.6	12
3	(United Kingdom) Alan Barnett		Britain	Yamaha	95.09 mph	1:35.02.0	10
4	(United Kingdom) Rod Gould		Britain	Yamaha	95.09 mph	1:35.14.0	8
5	(United Kingdom) Bill Henderson		Britain	Yamaha	94.32 mph	1:36.01.2	6
6	(Switzerland) Gyula Marsovsky		Switzerland	Yamaha	94.04 mph	1:36.18.0	5
7	(United Kingdom) Peter Berwick		United Kingdom	Yamaha	93.65 mph	1:36.42.6	4
8	(United Kingdom) Ian Richards		United Kingdom	Yamaha	93.47 mph	1:36.53.4	3
9	(Sweden) Börje Jansson		Sweden	Yamasaki	93.39 mph	1:36.50.0	2
10	(United Kingdom) Gordon Pantall		United Kingdom	Yamaha	93.35 mph	1:37.00.8	1

== 1971 Isle of Man Junior TT 350cc final standings ==
5 Laps (188.65 Miles) Mountain Course.

Place	Rider	Number	Country	Machine	Speed	Time	Points
1	(United Kingdom) Tony Jefferies		United Kingdom	Yamsel	89.81 mph	2:05.48.6	15
2	(United Kingdom) Gordon Pantall		United Kingdom	Yamaha	89.55 mph	2:06.25.0	12
3	(United Kingdom) Bill Smith		United Kingdom	Honda	89.81 mph	2:07.40.8	10
4	(United Kingdom) John Williams		United Kingdom	AJS	88.94 mph	2:07.17.0	8
5	(United Kingdom) Mick Chatterton		United Kingdom	Yamaha	87.38 mph	2:09.33.6	6
6	(United Kingdom) Gerry Mateer		United Kingdom	Aermacchi	87.18 mph	2:09.51.8	5
7	(United Kingdom) Mick Grant		United Kingdom	Yamaha	86.50 mph	2:28.30.6	4
8	(United Kingdom) Billy Guthrie		United Kingdom	Yamaha	86.31 mph	2:11.09.0	3
9	(East Germany) Günter Bartusch		East Germany	MZ	86.15 mph	2:11.24.2	2
10	(United Kingdom) Peter Berwick		United Kingdom	Suzuki	85.90 mph	2:11.47.2	1

== 1971 Isle of Man Senior TT 500cc final standings ==
6 Laps (236.38 Miles) Mountain Course.

Place	Rider	Number	Country	Machine	Speed	Time	Points
1	(Italy) Giacomo Agostini		Italy	MV Agusta	102.49 mph	2:12.24.4	15
2	(United Kingdom) Peter Williams		United Kingdom	Matchless	98.40 mph	2:18.03.0	12
3	(United Kingdom) Frank Perris		United Kingdom	Suzuki	96.51 mph	2:20.45.4	10
4	(Wales) Selwyn Griffiths		United Kingdom	Matchless	95.03 mph	2:22.57.4	8
5	(United Kingdom) Gordon Pantall		United Kingdom	Kawasaki	95.02 mph	2:22.57.6	6
6	(United Kingdom) Roger Sutcliffe		United Kingdom	Matchless	94.38 mph	2:23.56.2	5
7	(New Zealand) Keith Turner		New Zealand	Suzuki	94.08 mph	2:24.23.2	4
8	(United Kingdom) Charlie Sanby		United Kingdom	Seeley	93.04 mph	2:26.00.8	3
9	(United Kingdom) Tom Dickie		United Kingdom	Matchless	92.82 mph	2:26.21.2	2
10	(Germany) Hans-Otto Butenuth		Germany	BMW	92.81 mph	2:26.21.8	1

== 1971 Isle of Man Sidecar 500cc TT final standings ==
3 Laps (113.00 Miles) Mountain Course.

Place	Rider	Number	Country	Machine	Speed	Time	Points
1	(West Germany) Siegfried Schauzu/W.Kalauch		West Germany	BMW	86.21 mph	1:18.47.6	15
2	(West Germany) Georg Auerbacher/H.Hahn		West Germany	BMW	86.10 mph	1:18.53.2	12
3	(West Germany) Arsenius Butscher/J.Huber		West Germany	BMW	81.31 mph	1:23.32.6	10
4	(United Kingdom) Jeff Gawley/G.Alcock		United Kingdom	Yamaha	80.22 mph	1:24.40.8	8
5	(West Germany) Richard Wegener/A.Heinrichs		West Germany	BMW	80.15 mph	1:24.44.6	6
6	(United Kingdom) Chris Vincent/M.Casey		United Kingdom	BSA	79.19 mph	1:25.40.6	5
7	(United Kingdom) Dick Hawes & J.P.Mann		United Kingdom	Seely	76.37 mph	1:28.56.2	4
8	(United Kingdom) Robin Williams & Jack McPherson		United Kingdom	Triumph	75.47 mph	1:30.00.6	3
9	(United Kingdom) J.Mines & G.Davis		United Kingdom	Matchless	75.25 mph	1:30.46.0	2
10	(United Kingdom) Peter Brown & F.Holden		United Kingdom	BSA	74.62 mph	1:31.01.8	1

== Non-championship races ==
=== 1971 Isle of Man Production 750 cc TT final standings ===
3 Laps (113.00 Miles) Mountain Course.

Rank	Rider	Team	Speed	Time
1	(United Kingdom) Ray Pickrell	Triumph	100.07 mph	1:30.30.2
2	(United Kingdom) Tony Jefferies	Triumph	98.38 mph	1:30.03.0
3	(United Kingdom) Bob Heath	BSA	97.08 mph	1:33.17.4
4	(West Germany) Hans-Otto Butenuth	BMW	93.75 mph	1:36.36.0
5	(United Kingdom) David Nixon	Triumph	93.02 mph	1:37.21.0
6	(United Kingdom) B.J.Clark	Norton	92.97 mph	1:37.24.6
7	(United Kingdom) Tom Dickie	BMW	91.08 mph	1:39.26.0
8	(United Kingdom) Keith Heckles	Norton	86.11 mph	1:45.10.8
9	(United Kingdom) Tony Anderson	BMW	85.81 mph	1:45.32.0
10	(United Kingdom) Peter Darvill	Honda	80.51 mph	1:52.29.4

=== 1971 Isle of Man Production 500 cc TT final standings ===
3 Laps (113.00 Miles) Mountain Course.

Rank	Rider	Team	Speed	Time
1	(United Kingdom) John Williams	Honda	91.04 mph	1:39.28.8
2	(United Kingdom) Graham Penny	Honda	89.09 mph	1:41.39.6
3	(United Kingdom) A.T.Cooper	Suzuki	86.63 mph	1:44.32.8
4	(United Kingdom) Graham Bailey	Suzuki	86.42 mph	1:44.47.8
5	(United Kingdom) Tom Loughridge	Suzuki	85.34 mph	1:46.07.4
6	(United Kingdom) Martyn Ashwood	Suzuki	85.34 mph	1:46.07.6
7	(Isle of Man) Danny Shimmin	Suzuki	84.39 mph	1:47.21.6
8	(United Kingdom) P.Jones	Suzuki	81.67 mph	1:50.53.2
9	(United Kingdom) Bill Milne	Kawasaki	80.55 mph	1:52.26.0

=== 1971 Isle of Man Sidecar 750cc TT final standings ===
3 Laps (113.00 Miles) Mountain Course.

Rank	Rider	Team	Speed	Time
1	(West Germany) Georg Auerbacher/H.Hahn	BMW	86.86 mph	1.18.12.0
2	(United Kingdom) A.J.Samson/D.A.Jose	Triumph	82.50 mph	1.22.20.2
3	(United Kingdom) R.Williamson/J.McPherson	Weslake	82.25 mph	1.23.50.0
4	(United Kingdom) R.Woodhouse/D.Woodhouse	Honda	81.91 mph	1.22.55.0
5	(United Kingdom) D.Wood/D.Coomber	Norton	81.19 mph	1.23.39.8
6	(United Kingdom) D.Plummer/M.Brett	Triumph	80.77 mph	1.24.05.6
7	(United Kingdom) B.Currie/M.Scott	Triumph	80.60 mph	1.24.16.2
8	(United Kingdom) M.Potter/P.J.Burleigh	BSA	80.18 mph	1.24.43.4
9	(United Kingdom) D.Hawes/J.P.Mann	Seeley	80.09 mph	1.24.48.6
10	(United Kingdom) A.Methersill/M.Mitchinson	AMS	79.52 mph	1.25.24.8

=== 1971 Isle of Man Production 250 cc TT final standings ===
3 Laps (113.00 Miles) Mountain Course.

Rank	Rider	Team	Speed	Time
1	(United Kingdom) Bill Smith	Honda	84.14 mph	1:47.43.6
2	(United Kingdom) Charlie Williams	Yamaha	84.04 mph	1:47.52.0
3	(Northern Ireland) Tommy Robb	Honda	82.49 mph	1:49.47.6
4	(United Kingdom) Peter Berwick	Suzuki	81.27 mph	1:51.26.4
5	(United Kingdom) Gordon Daniels	Suzuki	81.09 mph	1:51.41.4
6	(United Kingdom) Lindsay Porter	Suzuki	79.14 mph	1:54.26.6
7	(United Kingdom) Roy Simmons	Suzuki	76.53 mph	1:58.20.0
8	(United Kingdom) Jim Evans	Montesa	74.44 mph	2:01.20.8
9	(United Kingdom) Bill Barker	Honda	72.25 mph	2:05.21.0

=== 1971 Isle of Man Formula 1 750 cc TT final standings ===
3 Laps (113.00 Miles) Mountain Course.

Rank	Rider	Team	Speed	Time
1	(United Kingdom) Tony Jefferies	Triumph	102.85 mph	1:06.02.0
2	(United Kingdom) Ray Pickrell	BSA	102.81 mph	1:06.28.0
3	(United Kingdom) Peter Williams	Norton	101.22 mph	1:07.06.2
4	(Canada) B.J.Clark	Yamaha	96.76 mph	1:10.12.0
5	(United Kingdom) Dudley P.Robinson	Yamaha	96.39 mph	1:10.28.2
6	(United Kingdom) David Nixon	Triumph	95.64 mph	1:11.01.0
7	(United Kingdom) Bill Smith	Kawasaki	95.37 mph	1:11.13.2
8	(United Kingdom) Tom Dickie	BMW	92.38 mph	1:13.31.4
9	(United Kingdom) Peter Darvill	Honda	85.81 mph	1:13.44.6
10	(United Kingdom) Charlie Dobson	Norton	91.67 mph	1:14.06.0
