= Tony Jefferies =

British motorcycle racer (1948–2021)

- Nationality: British
Motorcycle racing career statistics
Grand Prix motorcycle racing
| Active years | 1970 – 1971 |
| First race | 1970 350cc Ulster Grand Prix |
| Last race | 1971 350cc Ulster Grand Prix |
| First win | 1971 Isle of Man TT 350cc Junior TT |
| Last win | 1971 Isle of Man TT 350cc Junior TT |
| Championships | 0 |
Starts / Wins / Podiums / Poles / F. laps / Points; 4 / 1 / 2 / 0 / 0 / 30

Tony Jefferies (24 April 1948 – 29 December 2021) was a British Grand Prix motorcycle road racer. From a motorcycle racing family, his father was the frequent gold medal winner Allan Jefferies, and his brother Nick was also a TT racer.

Jefferies won the 1971 Isle of Man TT 350cc Junior TT. He won two more times at the TT in the 750cc Production class.

In 1973, Jefferies was paralysed in a racing accident, and spent the rest of his life in a wheelchair, continuing to run his father's bike dealership firm with his daughter Louise. A documentary was released in 1979, showing how he and his wife Pauline coped with his disability.

Jefferies died on 29 December 2021, at the age of 73. His son David Jefferies was also an Isle of Man TT victor.
