= Clive McLean =

English photographer

- Born: 27 October 1944; Leeds, England, UK
- Died: 29 March 2005 (aged 60)
- Occupation: Photographer

Clive McLean (27 October 1944 – 29 March 2005) was an English photographer and an AVN Hall of Fame member best known for his work at Hustler and Barely Legal. He was sometimes credited as Oliver English and Clive McClean.

McLean earned a qualification in graphic design in 1963 from Bradford College of Art. For a time, he was a band manager for Cat Stevens. He began photographing hippies and groupies for men's magazines and eventually did the first layout for Club.

While doing photography for Playboy in the 1960s, he was approached by Bob Guccione to come and work for him at Penthouse.

He met Larry Flynt in 1976 through photographer James Baes. Flynt was so impressed with McLean that he doubled the salary Guccione was paying him and brought him to the United States to begin a twenty-nine-year working relationship with Flynt.

McLean appeared in the 2000 PBS Frontline documentary on the industry called "American Porn". He was inducted into the AVN Hall of Fame in 2001. He received the "Best Vignette" Award at the 2004 AVN Awards, and, that same year, American Movie Classics aired "The AMC Project: I Want to Be Clive McClean". McLean married model/makeup artist, Erica, in 1994. Together, they created and worked on the Barely Legal and Hot Showers franchises. His first wife was the model Stephanie McLean. He had a son from that marriage named Roman.

McLean and his wife lived in the Hollywood Heights neighborhood of Los Angeles, and they were active in setting up a park for the neighborhood dogs called Pinehurst Park. The actor Nick Brendan (from Buffy the Vampire Slayer) was also involved in this activity.

Well regarded in the industry, he once shared studio space with fellow photographer Herb Ritts.
