= Suzuki 125 GP racers =

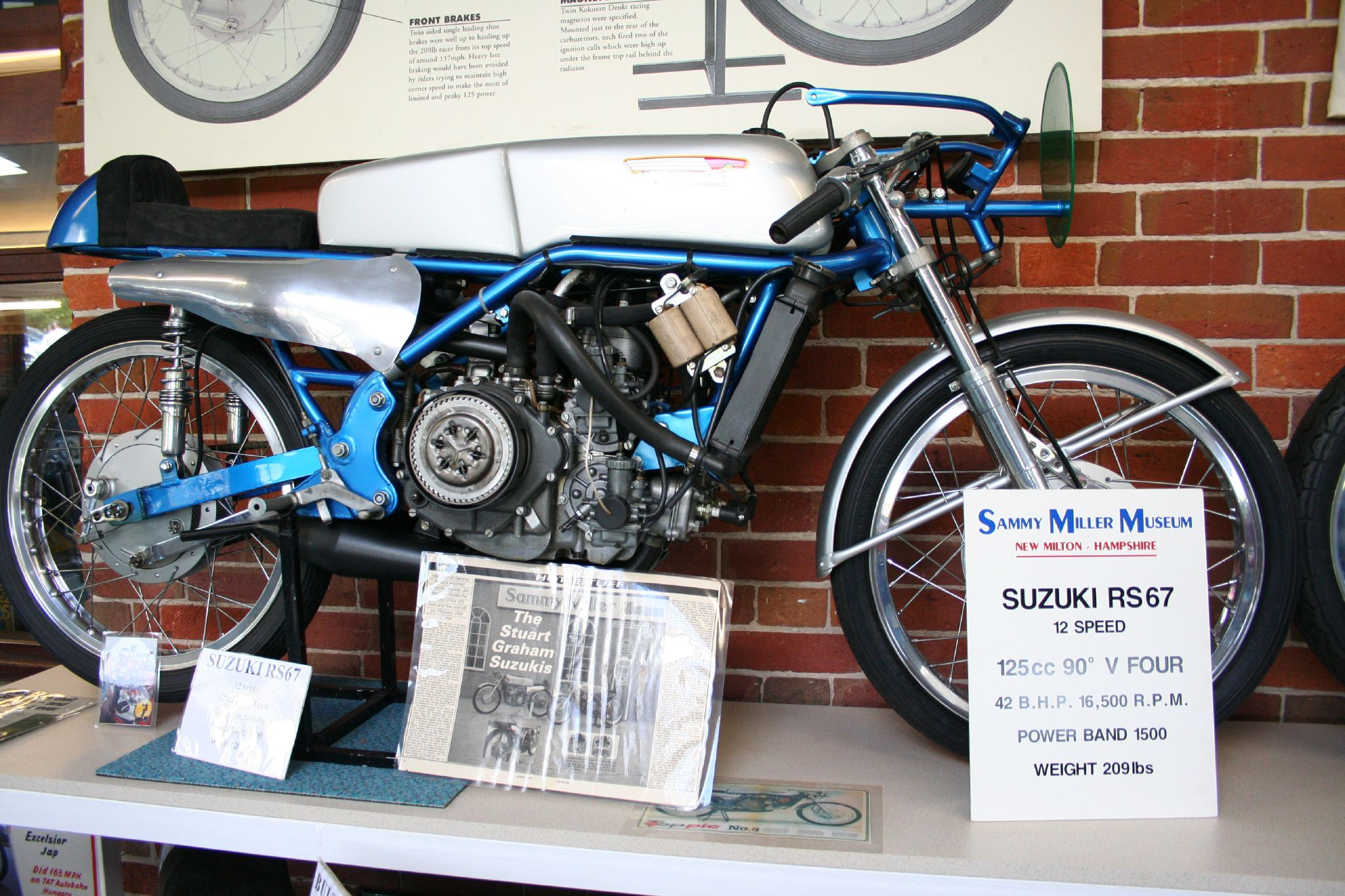
- Manufacturer: Suzuki
- Production: 1960–1968
- Class: 125 cc
- Engine: 2-stroke, air-cooled/liquid-cooled, 90° V-4/parallel-twin
- Top speed: 150 km/h (93 mph)
- Power: 13 hp (10 kW) @ 11,000 rpm to 42 hp (31 kW) @ 15,500 rpm
- Transmission: 12-speed, chain final drive
- Suspension: Telescopic forks (front); swing arm with twin spring/shock absorbers (rear)
- Brakes: Twin leading-shoe drum (front & rear)
- Tires: 2.50-18 / 2.50-18

The Suzuki 125 GP racers were a series of 125cc racing motorcycles designed, developed, and built by Suzuki, to compete in the Grand Prix motorcycle racing world championship, between 1960 and 1968.
