= Michel Garnier =

French painter (1753–1829)

- Born: 21 January 1753; Saint-Cloud, France
- Died: 22 December 1829 (aged 76); Versailles, France
- Known for: Painting, scientific illustration
- Movement: Le goût hollandais

Michel Garnier (21 January 1753 – 22 December 1829) was a French painter of genre scenes, portraits, and botanical still lifes. He was active primarily between 1781 and 1814, receiving patronage from the French nobility before participating as a scientific illustrator in the Baudin expedition to the Southern Seas.

== Biography ==
=== Early life and patronage ===
Garnier was active between 1781 and 1814; few documents detail his life and works. Garnier's father was employed as a floor polisher (frotteur) by Louis Philippe II, Duke of Orléans, at the Château de Saint-Cloud. Garnier began his career working for the royal household. His earliest known work, dated 1781, is a portrait of the Duke of Orléans.

He later entered the studio of the painter Jean-Baptiste Marie Pierre. Beginning around 1785, Garnier painted small-scale domestic genre scenes in le goût hollandais (the Dutch taste), a style at the end of the Ancien Régime that imitated the aesthetic of 17th-century Dutch masters.

=== The French Revolution ===
The outbreak of the French Revolution did not significantly disrupt Garnier's career. Following the abolishment of the Académie Royale's monopoly, Garnier exhibited his paintings at the Paris Salon in 1791, alongside other non-academic painters of the era. He continued to exhibit at the Salon until 1814, displaying genre subjects similar to contemporaries like Marguerite Gérard and Louis-Léopold Boilly.

=== The Baudin expedition and Mauritius ===
Between 1801 and 1810, Garnier resided in Isle de France (now Mauritius). He arrived on the island through his participation in the Baudin expedition (1800–1803), a French scientific voyage to the Southern Seas led by Nicolas Baudin. Garnier traveled as a passenger on the corvette Le Naturaliste. In 1801, during a stopover at Isle de France, Garnier and several other artists and scientists left the expedition due to failing health.

During his stay in Mauritius, Garnier painted still lifes of local fruits and botanicals. Upon his return voyage to France in 1810, his ship was captured by the British Royal Navy. He lost most of his possessions but retained his botanical paintings. He made unsuccessful attempts to sell these works to the French state before his death.

== Selected works ==
Garnier's works are held in public collections in France and the United States.

=== Public collections ===
- Philippe d'Orléans as Grand Master of the Freemasons (c. 1777) – Musée Condé, Chantilly.
- The Meeting (La Rencontre) – Musée Antoine-Lécuyer, Saint-Quentin.
- The Interrupted Marriage Contract (Le Contrat de mariage interrompu, 1784–1794) – Musée Carnavalet, Paris.
- A Merveilleuse under the Arcades of the Palais Royal (1787) – Los Angeles County Museum of Art (LACMA).
- The Letter (1791) – Minneapolis Institute of Art.
- The Painter's Studio (L'Atelier du peintre, 1793–1794) – Musée d'art moderne et contemporain, Saint-Étienne.
- Gust of Wind on the Pont Royal (1799) – Dallas Museum of Art.
- Scene of Reproach (Scène de reproches) – Musée des Beaux-Arts de Dijon.
- Botanical Studies (e.g., Cocos nucifera, Myristica fragrans) – Muséum national d'histoire naturelle, Paris.

=== Auction history ===
- The Departure of Monsieur de Saint-Marc for the Battle of Fontenoy (1788) – Oil on canvas, sold at Christie's Paris on 26 June 2002.
- Hide and Seek and The Music Lesson (1788/1789) – A pair of panel paintings exemplifying his Dutch-style genre scenes.

== Bibliography ==
- Aymonin, Gérard (1999). "Les tableaux de végétaux tropicaux de Michel Garnier (1753-1819)". Cahiers de la Compagnie des Indes (in French). 4: 103–108.
- de Maintenant, Elvire (30 May 2002). "Michel Garnier, peintre de genre sous la Révolution". L'Estampille-l'Objet d'Art (in French). 370: 76–82.
- Hamy, M. E. T. (1898). "Les peintures de Michel Garnier au Muséum d'Histoire naturelle". Bulletin du Muséum d'histoire naturelle (in French). 4 (8): 336–344. doi:10.5962/p.328030.
