= Suzuki TR750 =

Suzuki racing motorcycle

- Manufacturer: Suzuki
- Production: 1972–1976
- Class: Formula 750
- Engine: 738 cc (45.0 cu in) In-line three-cylinder two-stroke
- Bore / stroke: 70 mm (2.8 in) x 64 mm (2.5 in)
- Top speed: 170 mph
- Power: 105–120 hp (78–89 kW)
- Torque: 93 N⋅m (69 lb⋅ft)
- Ignition type: Contactless thyristor magneto
- Transmission: Wet multi-plate clutch, 5 gears, chain drive
- Frame type: Double-loop tubular
- Suspension: Front: Telescopic forks Rear: Swinging arm
- Brakes: Disc brakes, twin 270 mm diameter front, single 250 mm diameter rear
- Tires: 3.25x18 front, 3.50x18 rear

The Suzuki TR750 was a racing motorcycle from the Japanese manufacturer Suzuki, which was developed for Formula 750 racing. The machine was first raced at the 1972 Daytona 200. Barry Sheene won the 1973 season and was runner-up in 1975.

== History and Technology ==
The motorcycle, designated XR 11 within the group, was developed from the Suzuki GT750 road model, but none of the components were interchangeable. The performance-enhanced water-cooled in-line three-cylinder two-stroke engine had contactless thyristor magneto ignition and fuel was delivered via three 32 mm Mikuni carburettors. As with the production model, lubrication was carried out using fresh oil, the Suzuki CCI system (Crankshaft Cylinder Injection). The power was transferred to the rear wheel via a dry clutch and a five-speed gearbox. The usable speed range ranged from 6000 to 7500 rpm, the maximum torque (93 Nm) was reached at 7000 rpm. The double-loop tubular frame from the series had been lightened in order to reduce weight. Dunlop race tires, 3.25–18 at the front and 3.50–18 at the rear, were fitted.

The chassis did not do justice to the "brute" performance. When it debuted, the Suzuki TR 750 was nicknamed the "Flexi-Flyer". "The catastrophic driving characteristics of the fastest racing machine of its time resulted from an unfavourable weight distribution in connection with a high centre of gravity."

"The TR 750 had such a bad reputation as racing machines. [...] Only the brilliance of a Barry Sheene brought the XR 11 victories - nevertheless, the Flexi-Flyer is remembered as the first large two-stroke racing machine of modern times."

— Alan Cathcart,
