= Stephanie McLean (model) =

British model

- Born: Stephanie Harrison; England
- Occupations: Model, actress
- Known for: Penthouse Pet
- Spouse: Barry Sheene

Stephanie McLean is a British model who was the Penthouse Pet of the Month for April 1970 and Pet of the Year in 1971. She was the first Pet of the Year in the United States. She also appeared in Mayfair magazine on the cover of volume 5 issue 12 under the name "Gabrielle Nolan" and again in Mayfair magazine in volume 8 issue 8, this time under her own name.

== Career ==
Born Stephanie Harrison, after starting her career in fashion modeling, she posed in both Mayfair magazine and as a Penthouse cover girl. Stephanie was the Penthouse Pet Of The Month for April 1970 and was selected as the 1971 Pet Of The Year, being featured in a pictorial and on the cover of the September issue. She has the distinction of being the first awarded the Pet Of The Year title in the US. She was also on the February 1974 cover of the British edition of Cosmopolitan magazine.

== Personal life ==
Her first husband was photographer Clive McLean; they had one son together, named Roman. McLean met British motorcycle racer Barry Sheene in 1975, while he was on crutches following a racing accident. After divorcing her first husband, she and Sheene married in 1984, and had two children, a son and a daughter. The family emigrated to Australia in 1987, to try to ease Sheene's arthritis from his racing injuries. Her husband died of throat and stomach cancer in March 2003.

1970s	Evelyn Treacher	Stephanie McLean	Tina McDowall	Patricia Barrett	Avril Lund
1970s	Anneka Di Lorenzo	Laura Bennett Doone	Victoria Lynn Johnson	Dominique Maure	Cheryl Rixon
1980s	Isabella Ardigo	Danielle Deneux	Corinne Alphen	Sheila Kennedy	Linda Kenton
1980s	None	Cody Carmack	Mindy Farrar	Patty Mullen	Ginger Miller
1990s	Stephanie Page	Simone Brigitte	Jisel	Julie Strain	Sasha Vinni
1990s	Gina LaMarca	Andi Sue Irwin	Elizabeth Ann Hilden	Paige Summers	Nikie St. Gilles
2000s	Juliet Cariaga	Zdeňka Podkapová	Megan Mason	Sunny Leone	Victoria Zdrok
2000s	Martina Warren	Jamie Lynn	Heather Vandeven	Erica Ellyson	Taya Parker
2010s	Taylor Vixen	Nikki Benz	Jenna Rose	Nicole Aniston	Lexi Belle
2010s	Layla Sin	Kenna James	Jenna Sativa	Gina Valentina	Gianna Dior
2020s	Lacy Lennon	Kenzie Anne	Amber Marie	Tahlia Paris	Renee Olstead
2020s	Kassie Wallis	-	-	-	-
