= 1983 Swedish motorcycle Grand Prix =

Grand prix

(Sweden) 1983 Swedish Grand Prix
Race details
- Race 11 of 12 races in the 1983 Grand Prix motorcycle racing season
- Date: 6 August 1983
- Official name: Swedish TT
- Location: Scandinavian Raceway
- Course: Permanent racing facility; 4.031 km (2.505 mi)

500cc
Pole position
- Rider: (United States) Freddie Spencer
- Time: 1:37.000
Fastest lap
- Rider: (United States) Kenny Roberts
- Time: 1:37.110
Podium
- First: (United States) Freddie Spencer
- Second: (United States) Kenny Roberts
- Third: (Japan) Takazumi Katayama

250cc
Pole position
- Rider: (Belgium) Didier de Radiguès
- Time: 1:43.680
Fastest lap
- Rider: (Venezuela) Iván Palazzese
- Time: 1:50.390
Podium
- First: (France) Christian Sarron
- Second: (France) Hervé Guilleux
- Third: (Venezuela) Carlos Lavado

125cc
Pole position
- Rider: (Spain) Ricardo Tormo
- Time: 1:48.870
Fastest lap
- Rider: (Spain) Ricardo Tormo
- Time: 1:46.940
Podium
- First: (Switzerland) Bruno Kneubühler
- Second: (Italy) Fausto Gresini
- Third: (Austria) August Auinger

50cc
Pole position
- Rider: No 50cc race was held
Fastest lap
- Rider: No 50cc race was held
Podium
- First: No 50cc race was held
- Second: No 50cc race was held
- Third: No 50cc race was held

Sidecar (B2A)
Pole position
| Rider | (Switzerland) Rolf Biland | |
| Passenger | (Switzerland) Kurt Waltisperg | |
Fastest lap
| Rider | (Switzerland) Rolf Biland | LCR Yamaha |
| Passenger | (Netherlands) Kurt Waltisperg | |
| Time | 1:41.480 | |
Podium
| First | (Switzerland) Rolf Biland | |
| Second | (Netherlands) Egbert Streuer | |
| Third | (West Germany) Werner Schwärzel | |

The 1983 Swedish motorcycle Grand Prix was the eleventh round of the 1983 Grand Prix motorcycle racing season. It took place on the weekend of 4–6 August at the Scandinavian Raceway in Anderstorp, Sweden.

== Race summary ==
One of the most dramatic races in one of the most dramatic Grand Prix seasons ended in controversy as the championship's two main combatants collided on the last lap while battling for the lead.

Coming into the Swedish Grand Prix, Honda's Freddie Spencer led Yamaha's Kenny Roberts 117 to 115 with each man having won five of the season's ten previous races. Roberts had the momentum, having won four of the previous five rounds.

Roberts led Spencer going into the last lap of the race. Heading down the back straight, Spencer placed his Honda right behind Roberts' Yamaha as they reached the second to the last corner, a ninety degree right-hander. As both riders applied their brakes, Spencer came out of Roberts' slipstream and managed to get inside of the Yamaha. As they exited the corner, both riders ran wide off the track and into the dirt. Spencer was able to get back on the track and back on the power first, crossing the finish line just ahead of Roberts for a crucial victory. Roberts considered Spencer's pass to be foolish and dangerous and, exchanged angry words with him on the podium.

It was a controversial pass by the young Honda rider and one that the two participants still dispute to this day. Roberts contends that it was a dangerous move while Spencer maintains it was a calculated risk he had to take to secure the championship.

== Classification ==
=== 500 cc ===
| Pos. | Rider | Team | Machine | Time/Retired | Points |
|---|---|---|---|---|---|
| 1 | (United States) Freddie Spencer | HRC-Honda | NS500 | 49'17.530 | 15 |
| 2 | (United States) Kenny Roberts | Marlboro Agostini-Yamaha | YZR500 | +0.160 | 12 |
| 3 | (Japan) Takazumi Katayama | HRC-Honda | NS500 | +34.700 | 10 |
| 4 | (France) Marc Fontan | Sonauto Gauloises-Yamaha | YZR500 | +38.220 | 8 |
| 5 | (United States) Eddie Lawson | Marlboro Agostini Yamaha | YZR500 | +58.500 | 6 |
| 6 | (Italy) Marco Lucchinelli | HRC-Honda | NS500 | +58.830 | 5 |
| 7 | (United States) Randy Mamola | HB Sinclair-Suzuki | RG500 | +1'11.460 | 4 |
| 8 | (France) Raymond Roche | Moto Club Paul Ricard | NS500 | +1'11.710 | 3 |
| 9 | (United Kingdom) Ron Haslam | HRC-Honda | NS500 | +1'15.300 | 2 |
| 10 | (West Germany) Anton Mang | HB Gallina-Suzuki | RG500 | +1'15.460 | 1 |
| 11 | (United Kingdom) Keith Huewen | Heron-Suzuki | RG500 | +1 lap | |
| 12 | (Netherlands) Boet van Dulmen | Shell Nederland-Suzuki | RG500 | +1 lap | |
| 13 | (United Kingdom) Steve Henshaw | Harold Coppock | RG500 | +1 lap | |
| 14 | (United Kingdom) Chris Guy | | RG500 | +1 lap | |
| 15 | (Italy) Loris Reggiani | HB Gallina-Suzuki | RG500 | +1 lap | |
| 16 | (Sweden) Peter Sjöström | Jeb's Helmet Sweden | RG500 | +1 lap | |
| 17 | (Switzerland) Wolfgang von Muralt | | RG500 | +1 lap | |
| 18 | (Italy) Leandro Becheroni | | RG500 | +1 lap | |
| 19 | (Switzerland) Philippe Coulon | Marlboro-Suzuki | RG500 | +1 lap | |
| 20 | (Belgium) Didier de Radiguès | Team Johnson Elf | RS500 | +1 lap | |
| 21 | (Sweden) Peter Sköld | | RG500 | +1 lap | |
| 22 | (Sweden) Lars Johansson | | RG500 | +1 lap | |
| 23 | (Sweden) Åke Grahn | | YZR500 | +1 lap | |
| 24 | (United Kingdom) Steve Williams | DTR Fowler Yamaha | YZR500 | +1 lap | |
| 25 | (Finland) Esko Kuparinen | | RG500 | +1 lap | |
| 26 | (Finland) Timo Pohjola | | YZR500 | +1 lap | |
| 27 | (Sweden) Kjeld Sörensen | | RG500 | +2 laps | |
| 28 | (Italy) Alf Henrik Graarud | | YZR500 | +2 laps | |
| 29 | (Denmark) Chris Fisher | | YZR500 | +2 laps | |
| 30 | (Denmark) Børge Nielsen | | RG500 | +2 laps | |
| 31 | (Sweden) Jan-Olof Odeholm | | RG500 | +2 laps | |
| Ret | (United Kingdom) Barry Sheene | Heron-Suzuki | RG500 | Retired | |
| Ret | (Sweden) Peter Linden | | RG500 | Retired | |
| Ret | (Sweden) Risto Korhonen | | RG500 | Retired | |
| Ret | (Sweden) Alf Karlsson | | YZR500 | Retired | |
| DNS | (Netherlands) Jack Middelburg | Stichting Ned-Honda | RS500 | Did not start | |
| DNQ | (Norway) Beni Slydal | | RG500 | Did not start | |

== 1983 250cc Swedish Grand Prix final standings ==
| Place | Rider | Number | Country | Machine | Points |
|---|---|---|---|---|---|
| 1 | (France) Christian Sarron | 10 | France | Yamaha | 15 |
| 2 | (France) Hervé Guilleux | 44 | France | Kawasaki | 12 |
| 3 | (Venezuela) Carlos Lavado | 5 | Venezuela | Yamaha | 10 |
| 4 | (United Kingdom) Tony Head | 20 | Britain | Rotax-Armstrong | 8 |
| 5 | (United Kingdom) Alan Carter | 28 | Britain | Yamaha | 6 |
| 6 | (France) Jean Michel Mattioli | 22 | France | Yamaha | 5 |
| 7 | (France) Jean-Louis Guignabodet | 8 | France | Yamaha | 4 |
| 8 | (Belgium) Didier de Radiguès | 6 | Belgium | Chevallier-Yamaha | 3 |
| 9 | (France) Jacques Bolle | 19 | France | Pernod-Yamaha | 2 |
| 10 | (West Germany) Martin Wimmer | 4 | West Germany | Yamaha | 1 |

== 1983 125cc Swedish Grand Prix final standings ==
| Place | Rider | Number | Country | Machine | Points |
|---|---|---|---|---|---|
| 1 | (Switzerland) Bruno Kneubühler | 15 | Switzerland | MBA | 15 |
| 2 | (Italy) Fausto Gresini | | Italy | Garelli | 12 |
| 3 | (Austria) August Auinger | 6 | Austria | MBA | 10 |
| 4 | (Finland) Johnny Wickström | 10 | Finland | MBA | 8 |
| 5 | (Spain) Ricardo Tormo | 5 | Spain | MBA | 6 |
| 6 | (Switzerland) Hans Müller | 8 | Switzerland | MBA | 5 |
| 7 | (Italy) Pier Paolo Bianchi | 4 | Italy | Sanvenero | 4 |
| 8 | (Italy) Pierluigi Aldrovandi | | Italy | MBA | 3 |
| 9 | (Argentina) Willy Perez | | Argentina | MBA | 2 |
| 10 | (Italy) Maurizio Vitali | 13 | Italy | MBA | 1 |

== Sidecar Classification ==
| Pos | Rider | Passenger | Manufacturer | Time/Retired | Points |
|---|---|---|---|---|---|
| 1 | (Switzerland) Rolf Biland | (Switzerland) Kurt Waltisperg | LCR-Yamaha | | 15 |
| 2 | (Netherlands) Egbert Streuer | (Netherlands) Bernard Schnieders | LCR-Yamaha | | 12 |
| 3 | (Germany) Werner Schwärzel | (Germany) Andreas Huber | Seymaz-Yamaha | | 10 |
| 4 | (United Kingdom) Derek Jones | (United Kingdom) Brian Ayres | LCR-Yamaha | | 8 |
| 5 | (France) Alain Michel | (France) Claude Monchaud | LCR-Yamaha | | 6 |
| 6 | (United Kingdom) Frank Wrathall | (United Kingdom) Phil Spendlove | Seymaz-Yamaha | | 5 |
| 7 | (Japan) Masato Kumano | (Japan) Kunio Takeshima | LCR-Yamaha | | 4 |
| 8 | (Netherlands) Hein van Drie | (Netherlands) Willem van Dis | LCR-Yamaha | | 3 |
| 9 | (Switzerland) Alfred Zurbrügg | (Switzerland) Martin Zurbrügg | Seymaz-Yamaha | | 2 |
| 10 | (Switzerland) Hans Hügli | (Germany) Karl Paul | Seymaz-Yamaha | | 1 |

| Previous race: 1983 British Grand Prix | FIM Grand Prix World Championship; 1983 season | Next race: 1983 San Marino Grand Prix |
| Previous race: 1982 Swedish Grand Prix | Swedish Grand Prix | Next race: 1984 Swedish Grand Prix |
