= 1983 Austrian motorcycle Grand Prix =

(Austria) 1983 Austrian Grand Prix
Race details
- Race 6 of 12 races in the 1983 Grand Prix motorcycle racing season
- Date: 29 May 1983
- Official name: Großer Preis von Österreich
- Location: Salzburgring
- Course: Permanent racing facility; 4.246 km (2.638 mi)

500cc
Pole position
- Rider: (United States) Kenny Roberts
- Time: 1:17.890
Fastest lap
- Rider: (United States) Randy Mamola
- Time: 1:18.110
Podium
- First: (United States) Kenny Roberts
- Second: (United States) Eddie Lawson
- Third: (United States) Randy Mamola

250cc
Pole position
- Rider: (Belgium) Didier de Radiguès
- Time: 1:25.370
Fastest lap
- Rider: (France) Thierry Espié
- Time: 1:25.270
Podium
- First: (West Germany) Manfred Herweh
- Second: (Belgium) Didier de Radiguès
- Third: (France) Thierry Espié

125cc
Pole position
- Rider: (Italy) Eugenio Lazzarini
- Time: 1:30.660
Fastest lap
- Rider: (Spain) Ángel Nieto
- Time: 1:29.910
Podium
- First: (Spain) Ángel Nieto
- Second: (Italy) Eugenio Lazzarini
- Third: (Italy) Pier Paolo Bianchi

50cc
Pole position
- Rider: No 50cc race was held
Fastest lap
- Rider: No 50cc race was held
Podium
- First: No 50cc race was held
- Second: No 50cc race was held
- Third: No 50cc race was held

The 1983 Austrian motorcycle Grand Prix was the sixth round of the 1983 Grand Prix motorcycle racing season. It took place on the weekend of 27–29 May 1983 at the Salzburgring.

== Classification ==
=== 500 cc ===
| Pos. | Rider | Team | Machine | Time/Retired | Points |
|---|---|---|---|---|---|
| 1 | (United States) Kenny Roberts | Marlboro Agostini-Yamaha | YZR500 | 41'26.840 | 15 |
| 2 | (United States) Eddie Lawson | Marlboro Agostini Yamaha | YZR500 | +6.040 | 12 |
| 3 | (United States) Randy Mamola | HB Sinclair-Suzuki | RG500 | +17.160 | 10 |
| 4 | (Japan) Takazumi Katayama | HRC-Honda | NS500 | +20.910 | 8 |
| 5 | (Italy) Franco Uncini | HB Gallina-Suzuki | RG500 | +38.950 | 6 |
| 6 | (France) Marc Fontan | Sonauto Gauloises-Yamaha | YZR500 | +40.810 | 5 |
| 7 | (Italy) Marco Lucchinelli | HRC-Honda | NS500 | +58.130 | 4 |
| 8 | (Netherlands) Jack Middelburg | Stichting Ned-Honda | RS500 | +1'04.530 | 3 |
| 9 | (Switzerland) Sergio Pellandini | Carimati-Pezzani Racing | RG500 | +1'04.780 | 2 |
| 10 | (Netherlands) Boet van Dulmen | Shell Nederland-Suzuki | RG500 | +1'12.410 | 1 |
| 11 | (Italy) Gianni Pelletier | HIRT Giapauto-Honda | RS500 | +1'17.480 | |
| 12 | (United Kingdom) Keith Huewen | Heron-Suzuki | RG500 | +1 lap | |
| 13 | (United Kingdom) Barry Sheene | Heron-Suzuki | RG500 | +1 lap | |
| 14 | (United Kingdom) Chris Guy | | RG500 | +1 lap | |
| 15 | (Italy) Maurizio Massimiani | HIRT Giapauto-Honda | RS500 | +1 lap | |
| 16 | (Switzerland) Philippe Coulon | Marlboro-Suzuki | RG500 | +1 lap | |
| 17 | (Sweden) Peter Sjöström | Jeb’s Helmet Sweden | RG500 | +1 lap | |
| 18 | (West Germany) Ernst Gschwender | MO Motul Racing Team | RG500 | +1 lap | |
| 19 | (Italy) Fabio Biliotti | Moto Club Condor | RS500 | +1 lap | |
| 20 | (Switzerland) Wolfgang von Muralt | | RG500 | +1 lap | |
| 21 | (Italy) Walter Magliorati | Moto Club Carate | RG500 | +1 lap | |
| 22 | (United Kingdom) Steve Parrish | Mitsui-Yamaha | YZR500 | +2 laps | |
| 23 | (Italy) Virginio Ferrari | Cagiva | GP500 | +2 laps | |
| 24 | (Italy) Leandro Becheroni | | RG500 | +2 laps | |
| 25 | (West Germany) Alfons Ammerschläger | Skoal Bandit Heron Suzuki | RG500 | +2 laps | |
| 26 | (Norway) Beni Slydal | | RG500 | +2 laps | |
| 27 | (Austria) Josef Ragginger | | RG500 | +2 laps | |
| 28 | (Denmark) Børge Nielsen | | RG500 | +2 laps | |
| 29 | (Austria) Franz Kaserer | | RG500 | +2 laps | |
| Ret | (United States) Freddie Spencer | HRC-Honda | NS500 | Retired | |
| Ret | (Italy) Paolo Ferretti | | YZR500 | Retired | |
| Ret | (United States) Anton Mang | HB Gallina-Suzuki | RG500 | Retired | |
| Ret | (United Kingdom) Ron Haslam | HRC-Honda | NS500 | Retired | |
| Ret | (Switzerland) Andreas Hofmann | | RG500 | Retired | |
| Ret | (France) Raymond Roche | Moto Club Paul Ricard | NS500 | Retired | |
| DNS | (West Germany) Gustav Reiner | | RG500 | Did not start | |
| DNS | (Belgium) Didier de Radiguès | Team Johnson Elf | RS500 | Did not start | |

| Previous race: 1983 Spanish Grand Prix | FIM Grand Prix World Championship; 1983 season | Next race: 1983 Yugoslavian Grand Prix |
| Previous race: 1982 Austrian Grand Prix | Austrian Grand Prix | Next race: 1984 Austrian Grand Prix |
