= 1983 South African motorcycle Grand Prix =

(South Africa) 1983 South African Grand Prix
Race details
- Race 1 of 12 races in the 1983 Grand Prix motorcycle racing season
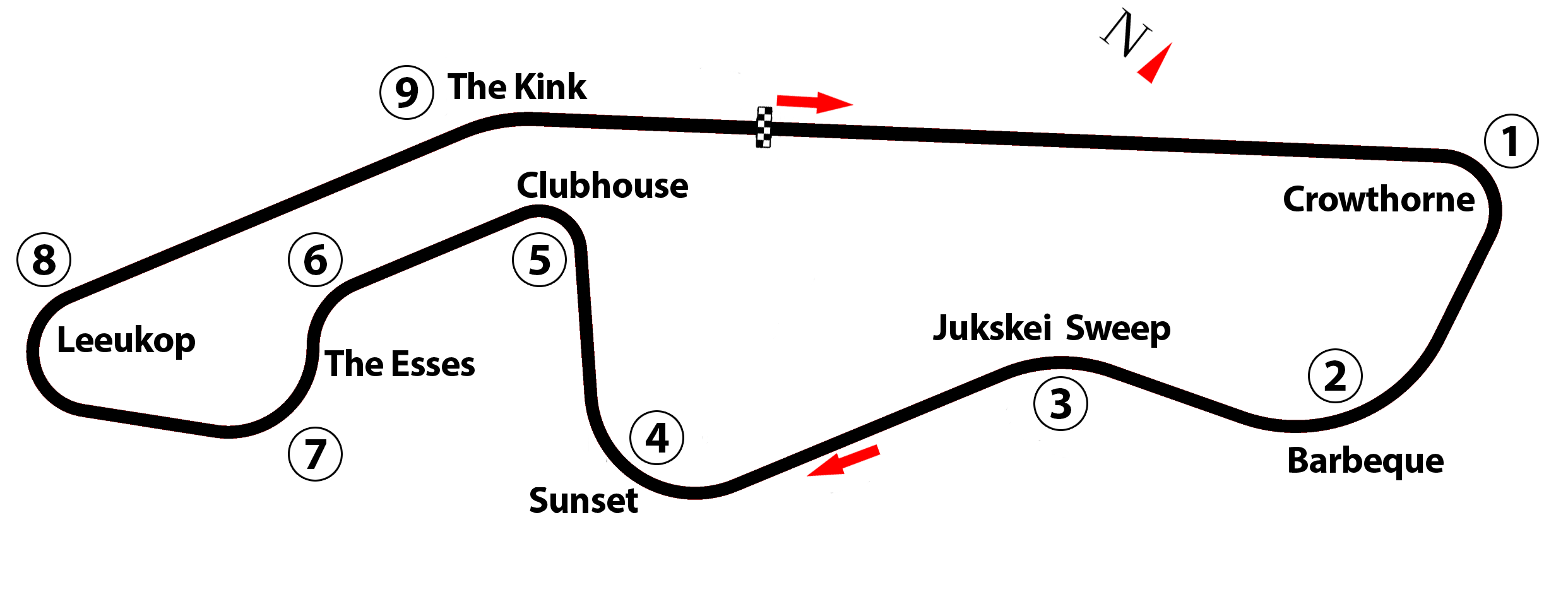
- Date: 19 March 1983
- Official name: Nashua Motorcycle Grand Prix
- Location: Kyalami
- Course: Permanent racing facility; 4.014 km (2.494 mi)

500cc
Pole position
- Rider: (United States) Freddie Spencer
- Time: 1:26.600
Fastest lap
- Rider: (United States) Freddie Spencer
- Time: 1:26.430
Podium
- First: (United States) Freddie Spencer
- Second: (United States) Kenny Roberts
- Third: (United Kingdom) Ron Haslam

250cc
Pole position
- Rider: (France) Jean-François Baldé
- Time: 1:31.700
Fastest lap
- Rider: (France) Jean-François Baldé
- Time: 1:31.450
Podium
- First: (France) Jean-François Baldé
- Second: (Belgium) Didier de Radiguès
- Third: (France) Hervé Guilleux

125cc
Pole position
- Rider: No 125cc was held
Fastest lap
- Rider: No 125cc was held
Podium
- First: No 125cc was held
- Second: No 125cc was held
- Third: No 125cc was held

50cc
Pole position
- Rider: No 50cc was held
Fastest lap
- Rider: No 50cc was held
Podium
- First: No 50cc was held
- Second: No 50cc was held
- Third: No 50cc was held

The 1983 South African motorcycle Grand Prix was the first round of the FIM 1983 Grand Prix motorcycle racing season. It took place on the weekend of 18–19 March 1983 at the Kyalami circuit which, has an elevation of 6,000 feet above sea level. It was the first Grand Prix motorcycle race held on the African continent. Because of the cost of flying Grand Prix teams and their equipment to South Africa, organizers were allowed to run just two classes rather than the three normally required by the FIM.

== Summary ==
=== Qualifying ===
Qualifying was led by Honda's Freddie Spencer with Eddie Lawson, Takazumi Katayama, Kenny Roberts, Ron Haslam, Marco Lucchinelli and Franco Uncini filling out the front row of the starting grid.

=== Race ===
The race started with the four factory-backed Hondas leading the field with Spencer out in front. Suzuki's Randy Mamola was in fifth with Roberts closing in on the leaders. Despite an overheating motorcycle, Roberts managed to secure second place on the ninth lap when he passed Haslam but, by then Spencer had built a 10-second lead. Roberts was able to close the gap to 5 seconds but, his overheating engine prevented him from gaining any further time and he had to settle for second place behind race winner Spencer. Haslam battled Yamaha's Marc Fontan to secure third place. Katayama had made a poor tire choice and when he tried to increase his pace late in the race, he crashed while trying to pass Jon Ekerold's Cagiva. Katayama's crash promoted Mamola to fifth place.

Jean-François Baldé led teammate Didier de Radiguès across the finish line to post a one-two finish in the 250cc race for Alain Chevallier's privateer Yamaha team.

== Classification ==
=== 500 cc ===
Pos.	Rider	Team	Machine	Time/Retired	Points
1	(United States) Freddie Spencer	HRC-Honda	NS500	43'58.500	15
2	(United States) Kenny Roberts	Marlboro Agostini-Yamaha	YZR500	+7.200	12
3	(United Kingdom) Ron Haslam	HRC-Honda	NS500	+13.300	10
4	(France) Marc Fontan	Sonauto Gauloises-Yamaha	YZR500	+13.500	8
5	(United States) Randy Mamola	HB Sinclair-Suzuki	RG500	+28.400	6
6	(Italy) Franco Uncini	HB Gallina-Suzuki	RG500	+37.700	5
7	(France) Raymond Roche	Moto Club Paul Ricard	NS500	+41.500	4
8	(United States) Eddie Lawson	Marlboro Agostini Yamaha	YZR500	+42.400	3
9	(Italy) Marco Lucchinelli	HRC-Honda	NS500	+45.400	2
10	(United Kingdom) Barry Sheene	Heron-Suzuki	RG500	+1'08.300	1
11	(Italy) Loris Reggiani	HB Gallina-Suzuki	RG500	+1'09.700	
12	(Switzerland) Sergio Pellandini	Carimati-Pezzani Racing	RG500	+1'13.800	
13	(Italy) Maurizio Massimiani	HIRT Italia	RS500	+1 lap	
14	(Italy) Fabio Biliotti	Moto Club Condor	RG500	+1 lap	
15	(Italy) Virginio Ferrari	Cagiva	GP500	+1 lap	
16	(Brazil) Marco Greco		RG500	+1 lap	
17	(South Africa) Jon Ekerold	Cagiva	GP500	+1 lap	
18	(Italy) Corrado Tuzii	Beton Bloc Racing	RS500	+1 lap	
19	(United Kingdom) Gary Lingham	Myers Motorcycles	RG500	+1 lap	
20	(United Kingdom) Steve Parrish	Mitsui Yamaha	YZR500	+1 lap	
21	(West Germany) Alfons Amerschläger	Skoal Bandit Heron Suzuki	RG500	+2 laps	
22	(West Germany) Wolfgang Schwarz	ES Motorradzubeh Racing Team	RG500	+2 laps	
Ret	(Japan) Takazumi Katayama	HRC-Honda	NS500	Accident	
Ret	(West Germany) Gustav Reiner		RG500	Accident	
Ret	(Netherlands) Boet van Dulmen	Shell Nederland-Suzuki	RG500	Mechanical	
Ret	(United Kingdom) Chris Guy		RG500	Mechanical	
Ret	(Italy) Leandro Becheroni		RG500	Accident	
Ret	(Switzerland) Michel Frutschi		RS500	Accident	
Ret	(Italy) Guido Paci		RS500	Accident	
DNQ	(Switzerland) Wolfgang von Muralt		RG500	Did not qualify	
DNQ	(France) Jean-François Baldé		RS500	Did not qualify	
DNQ	(Austria) Frank Kaserer		RG500	Did not qualify	
DNQ	(Denmark) Børge Nielsen		RG500	Did not qualify	
DNQ	(Switzerland) Philippe Coulon	Marlboro-Suzuki	RG500	Did not qualify	
DNQ	(Switzerland) Andreas Hofmann		RG500	Did not qualify	
DNQ	(Italy) Walter Migliorati	Moto Club Carate	RG500	Did not qualify	
DNQ	(Italy) Lorenzo Ghiselli		RG500	Did not qualify	
DNQ	(Norway) Bent Slydal		RG500	Did not qualify	

Previous race: 1982 German Grand Prix	FIM Grand Prix World Championship; 1983 season	Next race: 1983 French Grand Prix
Previous race: None	South African Grand Prix	Next race: 1984 South African Grand Prix
