= 1983 San Marino motorcycle Grand Prix =

1983 San Marino Grand Prix
Race details
- Race 12 of 12 races in the 1983 Grand Prix motorcycle racing season
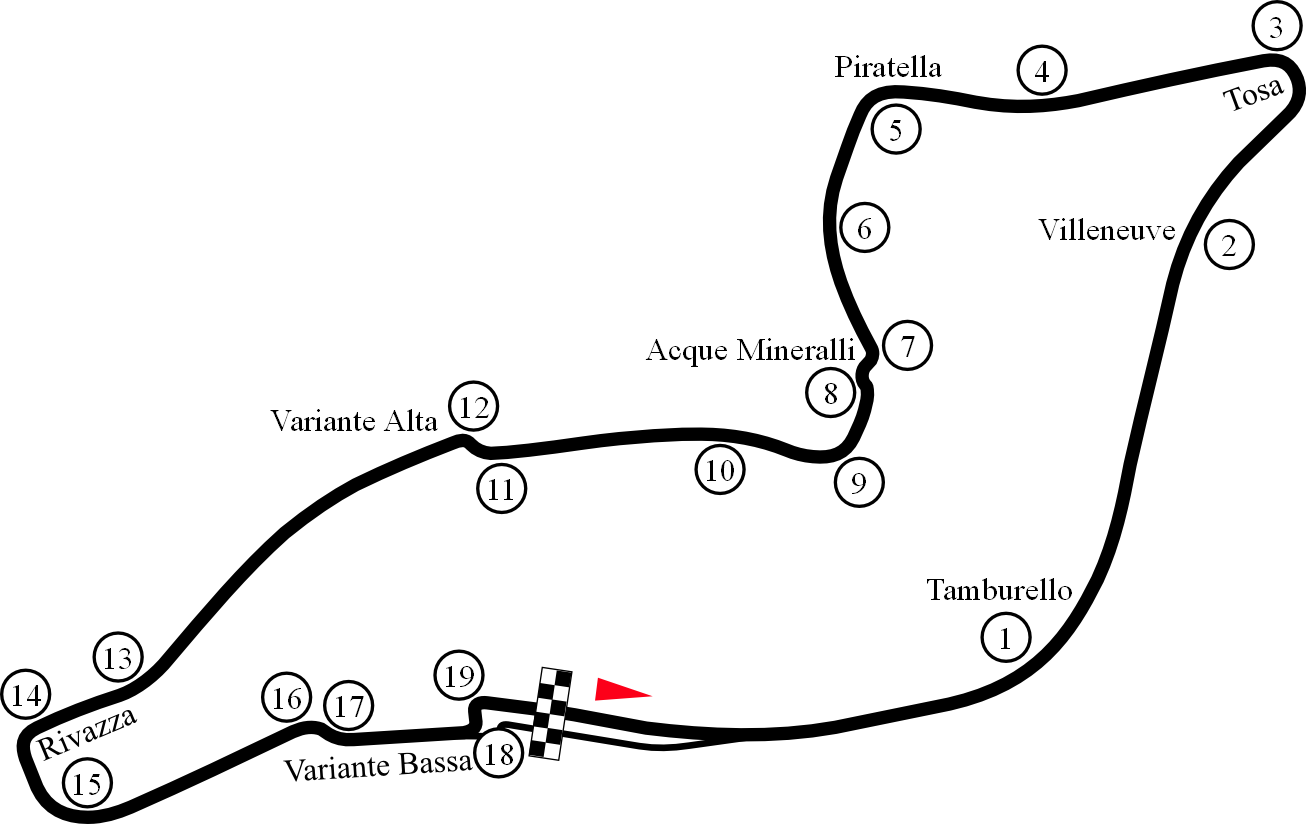
- Date: 4 September 1983
- Official name: Grand Prix S. Marino
- Location: Autodromo Dino Ferrari
- Course: Permanent racing facility; 4.933 km (3.065 mi)

500cc
Pole position
- Rider: (United States) Kenny Roberts
- Time: 1:53.590
Fastest lap
- Rider: (United States) Kenny Roberts
- Time: 1:53.360
Podium
- First: (United States) Kenny Roberts
- Second: (United States) Freddie Spencer
- Third: (United States) Eddie Lawson

250cc
Pole position
- Rider: No 250cc race was held
Fastest lap
- Rider: No 250cc race was held
Podium
- First: No 250cc race was held
- Second: No 250cc race was held
- Third: No 250cc race was held

125cc
Pole position
- Rider: (Spain) Ricardo Tormo
- Time: 2:06.730
Fastest lap
- Rider: (Spain) Ángel Nieto
- Time: 2:06.030
Podium
- First: (Italy) Maurizio Vitali
- Second: (Switzerland) Hans Müller
- Third: (Italy) Pierluigi Aldrovandi

50cc
Pole position
- Rider: (Switzerland) Stefan Dörflinger
- Time: 2:21.760
Fastest lap
- Rider: (Spain) Ricardo Tormo
- Time: 2:21.420
Podium
- First: (Spain) Ricardo Tormo
- Second: (Switzerland) Stefan Dörflinger
- Third: (Italy) Claudio Lusuardi

The 1983 San Marino motorcycle Grand Prix was the final race of the 1983 Grand Prix motorcycle racing season. It took place on 2–4 September 1983 at the Autodromo Dino Ferrari.

== Classification ==
=== 500 cc ===
Pos.	Rider	Team	Machine	Time/Retired	Points
1	(United States) Kenny Roberts	Marlboro Agostini-Yamaha	YZR500	48'16.630	15
2	(United States) Freddie Spencer	HRC-Honda	NS500	+1.230	12
3	(United States) Eddie Lawson	Marlboro Agostini-Yamaha	YZR500	+7.360	10
4	(Italy) Marco Lucchinelli	HRC-Honda	NS500	+19.390	8
5	(United States) Randy Mamola	HB Sinclair-Suzuki	RG500	+26.080	6
6	(France) Marc Fontan	Sonauto Gauloises-Yamaha	YZR500	+26.610	5
7	(France) Raymond Roche	Moto Club Paul Ricard	NS500	+27.190	4
8	(Netherlands) Boet van Dulmen	Shell Nederland-Suzuki	RG500	+1'34.090	3
9	(United Kingdom) Ron Haslam	HRC-Honda	NS500	+1'38.570	2
10	(West Germany) Anton Mang	HB Gallina-Suzuki	RG500	+1'48.800	1
11	(Italy) Leandro Becheroni		RG500	+1 lap	
12	(Switzerland) Wolfgang von Muralt		RG500	+1 lap	
13	(Switzerland) Philippe Coulon	Marlboro-Suzuki	RG500	+1 lap	
14	(United Kingdom) Chris Guy		RG500	+1 lap	
15	(Italy) Massimo Broccoli		RG500	+1 lap	
16	(United Kingdom) Steve Parrish	Mitsui-Yamaha	YZR500	+1 lap	
17	(Italy) Walter Magliorati	Moto Club Carate	RG500	+1 lap	
18	(Italy) Paolo Ferretti		RG500	+1 lap	
19	(France) Franck Gross		RS500	+1 lap	
20	(Sweden) Peter Sjöström		RG500	+1 lap	
21	(Italy) Fabio Biliotti	Moto Club Condor	RS500	+1 lap	
22	(West Germany) Ernst Gschwender	MO Motul Racing Team	RG500	+1 lap	
23	(Denmark) Børge Nielsen		RG500	+2 laps	
24	(South Africa) Jon Ekerold	Cagiva	GP500	+2 laps	
25	(Greece) Dimitris Papandreou		YZR500	+2 laps	
26	(Austria) Franz Kaserer		RG500	+2 laps	
27	(Switzerland) Andreas Hofmann		RG500	+2 laps	
Ret	(Italy) Maurizio Massimiani	HIRT Italia	RS500	Retired	
Ret	(Belgium) Didier de Radiguès	Team Johnson Elf	NS500	Retired	
Ret	(United Kingdom) Barry Sheene	Heron-Suzuki	RG500	Retired	
Ret	(Netherlands) Jack Middelburg	Stichting Racing Team	RS500	Retired	
Ret	(United Kingdom) Keith Huewen	Heron Suzuki	RG500	Retired	
Ret	(Italy) Corrado Tuzii	Beton Bloc Racing	RS500	Retired	
Ret	(Italy) Virginio Ferrari	Cagiva	GP500	Retired	
Ret	(Netherlands) Attilio Riondato		RG500	Retired	
DNS	(Italy) Loris Reggiani	HB Gallina-Suzuki	RG500	Did not start	
DNS	(Venezuela) Carlos Lavado	Venemotos-Yamaha	YZR500	Did not start	
DNS	(Japan) Takazumi Katayama	HRC-Honda	NS500	Did not start	

Previous race: 1983 Swedish Grand Prix	FIM Grand Prix World Championship; 1983 season	Next race: 1984 South African Grand Prix
Previous race: 1982 San Marino Grand Prix	San Marino Grand Prix	Next race: 1984 San Marino Grand Prix
