= 1983 Grand Prix motorcycle racing season =

Sports season

The 1983 Grand Prix motorcycle racing season was the 35th F.I.M. Road racing World Championship season.

== Season summary ==
The 1983 battle for 500 cc supremacy between Honda's Freddie Spencer and Yamaha's Kenny Roberts would be one of the most dramatic seasons since the 1967 duel between Giacomo Agostini and Mike Hailwood. As was the case in 1967, the battle for the 500 cc crown would pit a former world champion riding a powerful but, ill-handling four cylinder motorcycle against a young upstart riding a less powerful but better handling three cylinder motorcycle. Also as in 1967, the title chase wouldn't be decided until the final race of the season.

1983 would be the last year for the 50cc class as it would be upgraded to 80cc for the 1984 season. Stefan Dörflinger would take the honor of being the last 50cc World Champion. Angel Nieto won the 125 cc crown in dominating fashion, making it his 12th world championship. Carlos Lavado would capture his first 250 cc world championship in a season that saw eight riders share wins over eleven races, Lavado being the only competitor to win more than once. Eighteen-year-old British rider, Alan Carter, created excitement by winning the 250cc French Grand Prix in only his second world championship race, becoming the youngest winner of a 250cc Grand Prix race. Despite the auspicious start to his career, it would be Carter's only Grand Prix victory.

The departure of Kawasaki from the 500cc class left the remaining three Japanese factories to contend for the premier division. Suzuki returned with defending champion, Franco Uncini, Loris Reggiani and Randy Mamola aboard a new version of the RG500 which featured a square tube, welded aluminium frame. The Honda team of Freddie Spencer, Marco Lucchinelli and Takazumi Katayama was made even stronger with the addition of British rider, Ron Haslam, all competing on the three-cylinder NS500. Honda also introduced a production version of the NS500 called the RS500 for privateer racers. These were very similar to the NS500 machines used by the factory racing team but, lacked the special exhaust system. Yamaha team manager Giacomo Agostini had been unable to agree on a contract with rider Graeme Crosby, so AMA Superbike champion Eddie Lawson was brought in as Kenny Roberts' new teammate, both competing with the OW70 YZR500 with a V4 engine. Before the season began, Roberts announced that the 1983 season would be his final year in Grand Prix competition. Cagiva continued to campaign bikes ridden by Jon Ekerold and Virginio Ferrari.

Uncini's title defense was hampered as Suzuki experienced development problems with their chassis which left the team struggling to post good results. Suzuki's pursuit of a lightweight and compact machine had led to a myriad of handling problems associated with the flexing of the thin aluminum frame tubing. Roberts began the season with his YZR500 having problems with overheating and rear suspension, while Spencer started strongly, winning the first three races and five out of the first seven. Roberts was leading the second race in France, when his Yamaha split an expansion chamber causing it to lose power as Spencer won, with Roberts falling to fourth place. The French Grand Prix was marred by the deaths of Japanese rider Iwao Ishikawa during practice after colliding with Reggiani, while Swiss rider, Michel Frutschi, died from injuries sustained during the 500cc race. In Round 3 at Monza, Roberts crashed while leading Spencer three laps from the finish. Roberts came back to win the German Grand Prix, but then finished second to Spencer in Spain in a race Spencer called one of the toughest of his career.

Things began to go Roberts' way at the Austrian Grand Prix as Roberts won while Spencer's Honda suffered a crankshaft failure. In the Yugoslavian Grand Prix, Roberts' Yamaha failed to start immediately, while Spencer charged to an early lead, leaving Roberts to fight through the field to finish in fourth place. Roberts then went on a three-race winning streak with victories in the Netherlands, Belgium and England, while Spencer stayed close with a third place and two second-place finishes. Uncini was injured in an accident at the Dutch TT when he crashed while exiting a curve, then was struck in the helmet by Wayne Gardner's motorcycle as he tried to run off the track. The injury left Uncini in a coma, from which he recovered, but which forced him to sit out the remainder of the season.

The British Grand Prix gave Kenny Roberts a third victory in a row, after a race split in two stages following the deaths of Swiss rider Peter Huber and Northern Irish rider Norman Brown during lap 6 of the first stage. The race was subsequently stopped following some confusion over whether the race had been suspended or not. The event was then decided by aggregate times over the two stages, with Roberts leading both stages of the race, taking victory with Freddie Spencer in second.

The championship then moved to the penultimate round at the Swedish Grand Prix with Spencer holding a two-point lead over Roberts. Roberts led Spencer going into the last lap of the race. Heading down the back straight, Spencer placed his Honda right behind Roberts' Yamaha as they reached the penultimate corner, a ninety degree right-hander. As both riders applied their brakes, Spencer came out of Roberts' slipstream and managed to get inside of the Yamaha. As they exited the corner, both riders ran wide off the track and into the dirt. Spencer was able to get back on the track and back on the power first, crossing the finish line just ahead of Roberts for a crucial victory. Roberts considered Spencer's pass to be foolish and dangerous, and exchanged angry words with him on the podium.

Roberts would have to win the final round at the San Marino Grand Prix with Spencer finishing no better than third place in order for Roberts to win his fourth world championship. In a fitting end to a successful career, Roberts won his last-ever Grand Prix race, however Spencer was able to secure second place to claim the world championship. The two riders dominated the season with each claiming six victories and six pole positions in the 12 race series.

== 1983 Grand Prix season calendar ==
The following Grands Prix were scheduled to take place in 1983:

Round	Date	Grand Prix	Circuit
1	19 March ††	(South Africa) Nashua Motorcycle Grand Prix	Kyalami
2	3 April	Grand Prix de France	Bugatti Circuit
3	24 April	(Italy) Gran Premio delle Nazioni	Autodromo Nazionale Monza
4	8 May	(Germany) Großer Preis von Deutschland	Hockenheimring
5	22 May	(Spain) Marlboro Gran Premio de España de Motociclismo	Circuito Permanente Del Jarama
6	29 May	(Austria) Großer Preis von Österreich	Salzburgring
7	12 June	(Socialist Federal Republic of Yugoslavia) Yu Grand Prix	Automotodrom Rijeka
8	25 June ††	(Netherlands) Dutch TT Assen	TT Circuit Assen
9	3 July	Johnson GP of Belgium	Circuit de Spa-Francorchamps
10	31 July	(United Kingdom) Marlboro British Grand Prix	Silverstone Circuit
11	6 August	(Sweden) Swedish TT	Scandinavian Raceway
12	4 September	(San Marino) Grand Prix S. Marino	Autodromo Dino Ferrari

†† = Saturday race

=== Calendar changes ===
- The Argentine Grand Prix was taken off the calendar due to the high costs to host the event.
- The South African Grand Prix was added to the calendar.
- The French Grand Prix moved from the Nogaro circuit to the Bugatti Circuit in Le Mans after a strike by all the factory teams, as well as some private drivers, due to the very dangerous track conditions.
- The Nations Grand Prix moved from the Circuito Internazionale Santa Monica to the Autodromo Nazionale Monza.
- The German Grand Prix was moved forward, from 26 September to 8 May.
- The Austrian Grand Prix was moved back, from 2 to 29 May.
- The Yugoslavian Grand Prix was moved forward, from 18 July to 12 June.
- The Finnish and Czechoslovak Grand Prix were taken off the calendar due to dangerous track conditions.
- The San Marino Grand Prix moved from the Autodromo Internazionale del Mugello to the Autodromo Dino Ferrari.

== Calendar and Results ==
=== 1983 Grand Prix season results ===
Round	Date	Race	Location	50cc winner	125cc winner	250cc winner	500cc winner	Report
1	19 March	(South Africa) South African Grand Prix	Kyalami			(France) Jean-François Baldé	(United States) Freddie Spencer	Report
2	3 April	(France) French Grand Prix	Le Mans	(Switzerland) Stefan Dörflinger	(Spain) Ricardo Tormo	(United Kingdom) Alan Carter	(United States) Freddie Spencer	Report
3	24 April	(Italy) Nations Grand Prix	Monza	(Italy) Eugenio Lazzarini	(Spain) Ángel Nieto	(Venezuela) Carlos Lavado	(United States) Freddie Spencer	Report
4	8 May	(Germany) German Grand Prix	Hockenheim	(Switzerland) Stefan Dörflinger	(Spain) Ángel Nieto	(Venezuela) Carlos Lavado	(United States) Kenny Roberts	Report
5	22 May	(Spain) Spanish Grand Prix	Jarama	(Italy) Eugenio Lazzarini	(Spain) Ángel Nieto	(France) Hervé Guilleux	(United States) Freddie Spencer	Report
6	29 May	(Austria) Austrian Grand Prix	Salzburgring		(Spain) Ángel Nieto	(Germany) Manfred Herweh	(United States) Kenny Roberts	Report
7	12 June	(Socialist Federal Republic of Yugoslavia) Yugoslavian Grand Prix	Rijeka	(Switzerland) Stefan Dörflinger	(Switzerland) Bruno Kneubühler	(Venezuela) Carlos Lavado	(United States) Freddie Spencer	Report
8	25 June	(Netherlands) Dutch TT	Assen	(Italy) Eugenio Lazzarini	(Spain) Ángel Nieto	(Venezuela) Carlos Lavado	(United States) Kenny Roberts	Report
9	3 July	(Belgium) Belgian Grand Prix	Spa-Francorchamps		(Italy) Eugenio Lazzarini	(Belgium) Didier de Radiguès	(United States) Kenny Roberts	Report
10	31 July	(United Kingdom) British Grand Prix	Silverstone		(Spain) Ángel Nieto	(France) Jacques Bolle	(United States) Kenny Roberts	Report
11	6 August	(Sweden) Swedish Grand Prix	Anderstorp		(Switzerland) Bruno Kneubühler	(France) Christian Sarron	(United States) Freddie Spencer	Report
12	4 September	San Marino Grand Prix	Imola	(Spain) Ricardo Tormo	(Italy) Maurizio Vitali		(United States) Kenny Roberts	Report

== Participants and Standings ==
=== 500cc participants ===
Team	Constructor	Motorcycle	No.	Rider	Rounds
Team HB Suzuki	Suzuki	???	1	(Italy) Franco Uncini	1–8
Team HB Suzuki	Suzuki	???	12	(Netherlands) Boet van Dulmen	All
Team HB Suzuki	Suzuki	???	12	(Italy) Loris Reggiani	1, 10–11
Honda Racing Company	Honda	Honda NS500	3	(United States) Freddie Spencer	All
Honda Racing Company	Honda	Honda NS500	5	(Italy) Marco Lucchinelli	All
Honda Racing Company	Honda	Honda NS500	8	(Japan) Takazumi Katayama	1–11
Honda Racing Company	Honda	Honda NS500	9; 47; 43; 35	(United Kingdom) Ron Haslam	1–7, 9–12
Yamaha Marlboro	Yamaha	Yamaha YZR500 (OW70)	4	(United States) Kenny Roberts	All
Yamaha Marlboro	Yamaha	???	22	(Venezuela) Carlos Lavado	???
Yamaha Marlboro	Yamaha	Yamaha OW70	27	(United States) Eddie Lawson	All
Team HB Suzuki	Suzuki	Suzuki XR45	6	(United States) Randy Mamola	All
Team HB Suzuki	Suzuki	???	16	(West Germany) Anton Mang	6, 10–12
Heron Team Suzuki	Suzuki	Suzuki XR40	7	(United Kingdom) Barry Sheene	1–4, 6–8, 10–12
Heron Team Suzuki	Suzuki	???	25	(United Kingdom) Rob McElnea	10
Heron Team Suzuki	Suzuki	Suzuki RG 500 gamma	47; 55; 29	(United Kingdom) Keith Huewen	2–12
Team Sonauto Gauloises	Yamaha	???	10	(France) Marc Fontan	All
Cagiva Motor Italia	Cagiva	???	11	(Italy) Virginio Ferrari	1–4, 6, 10, 12
Cagiva Motor Italia	Cagiva	???	20	(South Africa) Jon Ekerold	1–2, 8, 12
Shell Nederland	Suzuki	???	12	(Netherlands) Boet van Dulmen	All
Honda Switzerland	Honda	Honda RS500	14	(Switzerland) Michel Frutschi	1–2*
Marlboro-Tissot	Suzuki	???	15	(Switzerland) Sergio Pellandini	1–10
Krauter-Vertrieb Racing	Suzuki	???	17	(West Germany) Gustav Reiner	1–5, 7
Team Johnson Elf	Honda	Honda RS500	18	(Belgium) Didier de Radiguès	2, 5, 9–12
???	Suzuki	???	19	(Switzerland) Wolfgang von Muralt	2–12
???	Suzuki	???	20	(South Africa) Jon Ekerold	???
???	Honda	Honda RS500	23	(Italy) Fabio Biliotti	1, 4–8, 12
HIRT Giapauto	Honda	???	28	(Italy) Gianni Pelletier	3–7
Stichting Ned.	Honda	???	30; 22	(Netherlands) Jack Middelburg	2–10, 12
???	Honda	Honda RS500/Honda NS500	35	(France) Raymond Roche	1–8, 11–12
???	Suzuki	???	38; 39	(Italy) Leandro Becheroni	1–4, 6, 10–12
???	Honda	Honda RS500	39	(Italy) Guido Paci	1-2**
Marlboro	Suzuki	???	41; 33	(Switzerland) Philippe Coulon	2–12
Mitsui Yamaha	Yamaha	???	43; 26	(United Kingdom) Steve Parrish	1–6, 8–12
Honda Britain Racing	Honda	???	47	(United Kingdom) Roger Marshall	8
Honda Britain Racing	Honda	Honda NS500	51	(Australia) Wayne Gardner	8, 10
???	Suzuki	???	49; 46; 13	(United Kingdom) Chris Guy	All
Jeb's Helmet Sweden	Suzuki	???	50; 41	(Sweden) Peter Sjöstrom	2–4, 6, 8–12
???	Suzuki	???	51	(West Germany) Ernst Gschwender	2–4, 6–9, 12
Honda Italia	Honda	Honda RS500	59; 52	(Italy) Maurizio Massimiani	1–2, 6–7, 10, 12
???	Suzuki	???	???	(Austria) Franz Kaserer	???
???	Suzuki	???	???	(Denmark) Børge Nielsen	???

Key
Regular Rider
Wildcard Rider
Replacement Rider

Notes

- * Frutschi was killed at the second round of the season, the French GP.
- ** Paci was killed during a motorcycle endurance race in Imola.

=== 250cc participants ===
Team	Constructor	Motorcycle	No.	Rider	Rounds
Team Sonauto Gauloises	Yamaha	???	1	(France) Jean-Louis Tournadre	1–7, 10–11
Team Sonauto Gauloises	Yamaha	???	10	(France) Christian Sarron	All*
Team Sonauto Gauloises	Yamaha	???	26	(France) Thierry Rapicault	All
Höstettler	Yamaha	???	2	(Switzerland) Jacques Cornu	1–4, 6, 8–9, 11
Elf Moto Racing Team	Armstrong-Rotax	???	3	(Switzerland) Roland Freymond	All
Team Mitsui Yamaha	Yamaha	???	4	(West Germany) Martin Wimmer	All
Team Mitsui Yamaha	Yamaha	???	21	(Republic of Ireland) Donny Robinson	2–6
Team Mitsui Yamaha	Yamaha	???	32; 28	(United Kingdom) Alan Carter	1–6, 8–11
Team Mitsui Yamaha	Yamaha	???	62	(United Kingdom) Paul Tinker	???
Venemotos Racing Team	Yamaha	???	5	(Venezuela) Carlos Lavado	All
Venemotos Racing Team	Yamaha	???	23	(Venezuela) Iván Palazzese	All
Team Johnson Elf	Chevallier	???	6	(Belgium) Didier de Radiguès	All
Lumaca	MBA/Yamaha	???/???	7	(Italy) Paolo Ferretti	1–2, 4, 7–9
Team Green	Yamaha	???	8	(France) Jean-Louis Guignabodet	All
Team Emco	Bartol	???	9	(Australia) Jeff Sayle	???
Pernod	Pernod	???	11	(France) Christian Estrosi	1–3, 5–6, 8–11
Pernod	Pernod	???	32	(France) Jacques Bolle	1–2, 5–7
TopCard Krauser	Chevallier	???	12	(France) Jean-François Baldé	1–8
TopCard Krauser	Chevallier	???	???	(France) Bernad Fau	1–2, 4–11
???	Bartol/Yamaha	???/???	14	(France) Patrick Fernandez	All
Cobas Motorcycles	Cobas	???	15	(Spain) Sito Pons	1–6
???	Yamaha	???	16	(Spain) Ángel Nieto	5–7
Massa Real Racing Team	Real-Rotax	???	19	(West Germany) Manfred Herweh	1, 3–9
???	Armstrong-Rotax	???	20	(United Kingdom) Tony Head	1–4, 6–11
Römer Racing Team	Yamaha	???	25	(West Germany) Reinhold Roth	All
???	Yamaha	???	34; 30	(Switzerland) Bruno Lüscher	4
Team Forever	Yamaha	???	34	(Italy) Massimo Matteoni	3–5, 7–9
Team Go-West	Yamaha	???	35	(France) Jacques Bolle	10–11
???	Yamaha	???	36; 58	(France) Jean-Michel Mattioli	2, 4–5, 7–11
???	Yamaha	???	41; 33	(France) Bernard Fau	1–2, 4–11
???	MBA	???	42	(France) Guy Bertin	2, 4–9, 11
Kawasaki	Kawasaki	???	44; 47; 2; 31	(France) Hervé Guilleux	1, 3–11
???	Yamaha	???	46	(Japan) Teruo Fukuda	7–11
RK	Morena-Rotax	???	48; 37	(Belgium) Jean-Marc Toffolo	2, 7, 9
Dalmac Racing	Yamaha	???	49; 39	(United Kingdom) Donnie Mcleod	4–6, 8–11
???	Yamaha	???	54; 50	(Switzerland) Edwin Weibel	3–4
???	Yamaha	???	56; 35	(West Germany) Harald Eckl	2–4, 6–11
Chevallier Elf	Chevallier	???	57; 21	(France) Thierry Espié	All
J.J. Moto Club	Cobas-Rotax	???	59; 36	(Spain) Carlos Cardús	1–2, 4–5, 8–11

Key
Regular Rider
Wildcard Rider
Replacement Rider

Notes

- * The 250cc did not participate in round 12 of the championship, the San Marino GP.

=== 500cc riders' standings ===
Scoring system

Points were awarded to the top ten finishers in each race. A rider has to finish the race to earn points. All races counted towards the final standings.

Position	1st	2nd	3rd	4th	5th	6th	7th	8th	9th	10th
Points	15	12	10	8	6	5	4	3	2	1

Place	Rider	Team	Machine	RSA (South Africa)	FRA (France)	NAT (Italy)	GER (Germany)	ESP (Spain)	AUT (Austria)	YUG (Socialist Federal Republic of Yugoslavia)	NED (Netherlands)	BEL (Belgium)	GBR (United Kingdom)	SWE (Sweden)	RSM (San Marino)	Points
1	(United States) Freddie Spencer	HRC-Honda	NS500	1	1	1	4	1	Ret	1	3	2	2	1	2	144
2	(United States) Kenny Roberts	Marlboro Agostini-Yamaha	YZR500	2	4	Ret	1	2	1	4	1	1	1	2	1	142
3	(United States) Randy Mamola	HB Sinclair-Suzuki	RG500	5	Ret	2	7	4	3	2	4	3	3	7	5	89
4	(United States) Eddie Lawson	Marlboro Agostini-Yamaha	YZR500	8	Ret	3	9	6	2	3	5	5	4	5	3	78
5	(Japan) Takazumi Katayama	HRC-Honda	NS500	Ret	DNS	5	2	3	4	5	2	4	6	3	DNS	77
6	(France) Marc Fontan	Sonauto Gauloises-Yamaha	YZR500	4	6	7	8	7	6	6	7	6	5	4	6	64
7	(Italy) Marco Lucchinelli	HRC-Honda	NS500	9	2	10	3	Ret	7	9	Ret	7	Ret	6	4	48
8	(United Kingdom) Ron Haslam	HRC-Honda	NS500	3	3	Ret	Ret	Ret	Ret	Ret		8	7	9	9	31
9	(Italy) Franco Uncini	HB Gallina-Suzuki	RG500	6	Ret	4	6	5	5	Ret	Ret					31
10	(France) Raymond Roche	Moto Club Paul Ricard	NS500	7	Ret	6	5	Ret	Ret	Ret	9	DNS		8	7	22
11	(Netherlands) Boet van Dulmen	Shell Nederland-Suzuki	RG500	Ret	DNS	Ret	10	11	10	7	8	9	8	12	8	17
12	(Netherlands) Jack Middelburg	Stichting Ned-Honda	NS500		10	Ret	11	8	8	11	6	Ret	Ret	DNS	Ret	12
13	(Switzerland) Sergio Pellandini	Marlboro Tissot-Suzuki	RG500	12	9	8	Ret	9	9	10	Ret	10	Ret			11
14	(United Kingdom) Barry Sheene	Heron-Suzuki	RG500	10	7	9	Ret		13	13	Ret	DNS	9	Ret	Ret	9
15	(United Kingdom) Keith Huewen	Heron-Suzuki	RG500		5	Ret	17	10	12	Ret	Ret	11	11	11	Ret	7
16	(Italy) Gianni Pelletier	HIRT Giapauto-Honda	RS500			Ret	13	12	11	8						3
17	(Italy) Guido Paci		RS500	Ret	8											3
18	(Germany) Anton Mang	HB Gallina-Suzuki	RG500						Ret				12	10	10	2
19	(Australia) Paul Lewis		RG500										10			1
20	(United Kingdom) Mark Salle	Royal Cars Suzuki	RG500								10	12	14			1
	(Switzerland) Wolfgang von Muralt		RG500	DNQ	11	17	21	Ret	23	15	Ret	15	Ret	17	12	0
	(Italy) Leandro Beccheroni		RG500	Ret	Ret	22	12	Ret	21	Ret			Ret	18	11	0
	(Italy) Virginio Ferrari	Cagiva	GP500	15	Ret	11	Ret		26	Ret			Ret		Ret	0
	(Italy) Loris Reggiani	HB Gallina-Suzuki	RG500	11									Ret	15	DNS	0
	(New Zealand) Stu Avant		RG500		17		30				11	16				0
	(Italy) Walter Magliorati	Moto Club Carate	RG500	DNQ	16	12	14		25	12					17	0
	(Switzerland) Philippe Coulon	Marlboro-Suzuki	RG500	DNQ	12	Ret	23	17	16	14	18	Ret	24	19	13	0
	(United Kingdom) Norman Brown†	Hector Neill Racing	RG500								12	DNS	Ret†			0
	(United Kingdom) Chris Guy		RG500	Ret	Ret	24	25	18	14	23	Ret	Ret	13	14	14	0
	(Sweden) Peter Sjostrom	Jeb's Helmet Sweden	RG500		13	14	15		17		Ret	Ret	22	16	20	0
	(Italy) Maurizio Massimiani	Honda-Italia	RS500	13	14				15	Ret			23		Ret	0
	(Germany) Gustav Reiner	Krauter-Vertrieb Racing	RG500	Ret	Ret	13	16	14	Ret	17						0
	(United Kingdom) Steve Parrish	Mitsui Yamaha	YZR500	20	Ret	15	18	15	20		Ret	DNQ	Ret	13	16	0
	(Finland) Eero Hyvarinen		RG500		Ret					19	15	13				0
	(Belgium) Didier de Radigues	Team Johnson Elf	RS500		Ret	Ret	DNQ	13	Ret			Ret	Ret	20	Ret	0
	(Netherlands) Henk de Vries	Henk de Vries Motoren	RG500				24				13					0
	(Italy) Fabio Biliotti	Moto Club Condor	RS500	14			22	16	19	18	17	DNS	DNQ		21	0
	(France) Franck Gross		RS500							16	Ret	14	18		19	0
	(Netherlands) Rob Punt	M. Woestenburg	RG500								14	18	20			0
	(France) Louis-Luc Maisto		RG500		15											0
	(United Kingdom) Kevin Wrettom		RG500										15			0
	(Italy) Massimo Broccoli		RG500												15	0
	(Germany) Ernst Gschwender	MO Motul Racing Team	RG500		18	Ret	19		18	21	16	17			22	0
	(Brazil) Marco Greco		RG500	16	Ret	18	31	Ret		Ret			DNQ			0
	(Australia) Wayne Gardner	Honda Britain Racing	NS500								Ret		16			0
	(Italy) Marco Papa		RG500			16										0
	(South Africa) Jon Ekerold	Cagiva	GP500	17	19	DNQ					Ret		DNQ		24	0
	(United Kingdom) Steve Henshaw	Harold Coppock	RG500										17			0
	(Italy) Corrado Tuzii	Beton Bloc Racing	RS500	18	DNQ	23	28	19					DNQ		Ret	0
	(Italy) Paolo Ferretti		YZR500		Ret	20	29		Ret						18	0
	(Switzerland) Peter Huber†		RG500		DNQ	26	33			22		19	Ret†			0
	(United Kingdom) Gary Lingham	Myers Motorcycles	RG500	19									Ret			0
	(Italy) Lorenzo Ghiselli		RG500	DNQ		19										0
	(Netherlands) Rinus van Kasteren		RG500								19					0
	(United Kingdom) Alan Irwin	D. McManus	RG500										19			0
	(Denmark) Børge Nielsen		RG500	DNQ	DNQ		Ret		28	Ret	20	20		29	23	0
	(Sweden) Bent Slydal		RG500	DNQ					27	20		Ret	DNQ	Ret		0
	(Germany) Walter Hoffmann	Deutsche Tecalemit	RG500				20									0
	(Spain) Francisco Rico		RG500					20								0
	(Germany) Alfons Ammerschlager	Skoal Bandit Heron Suzuki	RG500	21			Ret	22	22							0
	(Austria) Franz Kaserer		RG500	DNQ		25	Ret		29	24	21	Ret			26	0
	(Switzerland) Andreas Hofmann		RG500	DNQ	Ret	21	Ret	Ret	Ret				DNQ		27	0
	(New Zealand) Dennis Ireland		RG500				34				Ret	21	DNQ			0
	(United Kingdom) Con Law		RG500									Ret	21			0
	(Spain) Carlos Morante		YZR500					21								0
	(Sweden) Peter Skold		RG500											21		0
	(Netherlands) Johan van Eijk		RG500								22	22				0
	(Germany) Wolfgang Schwarz	ES Motorradzubeh Racing Team	RG500	22			27									0
	(Sweden) Lars Johansson		RG500											22		0
	(Spain) Jose Parra		RG500					23								0
	(Belgium) Jean-Philippe Delers		YZR500									23				0
	(Sweden) Ake Grahn		YZR500											23		0
	(Austria) Josef Ragginger		RG500						24	25						0
	(United Kingdom) Steve Williams	DTR Fowler Yamaha	YZR500				Ret						DNQ	24		0
	(Greece) Dimitrios Papandreou		YZR500							Ret					25	0
	(Finland) Esko Kuparinen		RG500											25		0
	(United Kingdom) Dave Dean		RG500			Ret	26						Ret			0
	(Finland) Timo Pohjola		YZR500											26		0
	(Denmark) Kjeld Sorensen		RG500											27		0
	(Norway) Alf Graarud		YZR500											28		0
	(Sweden) Jan-Olof Odeholm		RG500											30		0
	(Switzerland) Alain Roethlisberger		YZR500		Ret	Ret	32									0
	(Germany) Dieter Klopfer	DIKO					35									0
	(France) Jean Lafond	Claude Fior			Ret		Ret					DNS				0
	(Switzerland) Michel Frutschi†	Honda Switzerland	RS500	Ret	Ret†											0
	(United Kingdom) Roger Marshall	Honda Britain Racing	RS500								Ret		Ret			0
	(Germany) Klaus Klein		RG500				Ret									0
	(Germany) Gerhard Treusch		RG500				Ret									0
	(Spain) Marco Grino		RG500					Ret								0
	(Belgium) Bernard Denis		RG500									Ret				0
	(United Kingdom) Rob McElnea	Heron-Suzuki	RG500										Ret			0
	(Australia) John Pace		RG500										Ret			0
	(United Kingdom) Graham Wood	DTR Fowler Yamaha	YZR500										Ret			0
	(Denmark) Chris Fisker		RG500											Ret		0
	(Sweden) Peter Linden		RG500											Ret		0
	(Finland) Risto Korhonen		RG500											Ret		0
	(Sweden) Peter Karlsson		YZR500											Ret		0
	(Italy) Attilio Riondato		RG500												Ret	0
	(Venezuela) Carlos Lavado	Marlboro-Yamaha	YZR500												DNS	0
	(France) Jean-François Baldé		NS500	DNQ												0
	(Finland) Cai Hedstrom				DNQ											0
	(Netherlands) Harry Heutmekers		RG500				DNQ									0
	(United Kingdom) Simon Buckmaster		RG500										DNQ			0
Sources: † denotes the death of a rider

=== 250cc standings ===
Place	Rider	Team	Machine	RSA (South Africa)	FRA (France)	ITA (Italy)	GER (Germany)	ESP (Spain)	AUT (Austria)	YUG (Socialist Federal Republic of Yugoslavia)	NED (Netherlands)	BEL (Belgium)	GBR (United Kingdom)	SWE (Sweden)	Points
1	(Venezuela) Carlos Lavado	Venemotos-Yamaha	YZR250	7	Ret	1	1	7	7	1	1	3	4	3	100
2	(France) Christian Sarron	Sonauto Gauloises-Yamaha	YZR250	Ret	Ret	Ret	7	2	4	2	Ret	2	3	1	73
3	(Belgium) Didier de Radiguès	Team Johnson Elf	Chevallier YZR250	2	4	9	3	Ret	2	Ret	7	1	9	8	68
4	(France) Hervé Guilleux	Kawasaki	KR250	3		6	12	1	6	Ret	3	5	Ret	2	63
5	(France) Thierry Espié	Chevallier-Elf	Chevallier YZR250	11	9	2	Ret	5	3	15	6	4	2	13	55
6	(West Germany) Martin Wimmer	Mitsui-Yamaha	YZR250	8	Ret	4	Ret	3	5	Ret	5	6	5	10	45
7	(Germany) Manfred Herweh	Massa Real Racing Team	Real-Rotax	6		3	Ret	21	1	3	Ret	Ret			40
8	(France) Jean-François Baldé	TopCard Krauser	Chevallier YZR250	1	15	10	8	6	12	4	Ret				32
9	(Switzerland) Jacques Cornu	Höstettler-Yamaha	YZR250	5	2	5	Ret		9		9	7		18	32
10	(France) Jacques Bolle	Pernod-Yamaha	YZR250	Ret	7	Ret	Ret	18	Ret	6			1	9	26
11	(France) Patrick Fernandez	Bartol-Yamaha	YZR250	4	6	Ret	2	Ret	11	10	Ret	11	Ret	14	26
12	(United Kingdom) Alan Carter	Mitsui-Yamaha	YZR250	Ret	1	Ret	13	Ret	Ret	DNS	Ret	DNQ	14	5	21
13	(Venezuela) Ivan Palazzese	Venemotos-Yamaha	YZR250	10	14	8	Ret	10	18	Ret	2	8	16	15	20
14	(France) Thierry Rapicault	Sonauto Gauloises-Yamaha	YZR250	9	3	7	21	Ret	Ret	13	Ret	13	8	Ret	19
15	(France) Jean-Louis Guignabodet	Team Green	YZR250	13	Ret	Ret	Ret	Ret	13	7	4	9	21	7	18
16	(United Kingdom) Tony Head	Armstrong-Rotax	CF250	16	5	13	18	DNQ	17	19	14	Ret	22	4	14
17	(West Germany) Reinhold Roth	Römer Racing Team	YZR250		18	11	5	15	8	Ret			6	16	14
18	(Spain) Sito Pons	Kobas	Kobas-Rotax	15	13	Ret	9	4	DNS				DNS		10
19	(Switzerland) Bruno Luscher		YZR250		16	12	4	Ret	14	14	22	23	27	Ret	8
20	(France) Guy Bertin		MBA		Ret		Ret	13	10	5	Ret	Ret		Ret	7
21	(France) Jean Michel Mattioli		YZR250		11		29	22		17	12	16	18	6	5
21	(Switzerland) Roland Freymond	Elf Moto Racing Team	CF250	12	Ret	Ret	6	12	Ret	Ret	Ret	21	Ret	Ret	5
23	(Belgium) Jean Marc Toffolo	RK	Morena-Rotax		10	Ret	Ret		Ret	8	Ret	10	Ret		5
24	(Japan) Teruo Fukuda		YZR250							11	21	17	7	Ret	4
25	(France) Christian Estrosi	Pernod-Yamaha	YZR250	17	17	Ret	Ret	Ret	16		8	12	Ret	Ret	3
25	(United Kingdom) Donnie Robinson	Mitsui-Yamaha	YZR250		Ret	Ret	Ret	8	DNS						3
25	(West Germany) Harald Eckl		YZR250		8	14	19		Ret	16	Ret	22	12	17	3
28	(Spain) Carlos Cardus	Kobas	Kobas-Rotax	Ret	21	Ret	11	9	Ret		16	Ret	11	Ret	2
28	(Italy) Massimo Matteoni	Team Forever	YZR250			Ret	17	14		9	Ret	15			2
30	(United Kingdom) Donnie McLeod	Dalmac Racing	YZR250				25	Ret	15		10	24	19	12	1
30	(France) Bernard Fau	TopCard Krauser	Chevallier YZR250	Ret	Ret		10	20	Ret	Ret	Ret	Ret	Ret	Ret	1
30	(Australia) Graeme McGregoer	EMC	EMC-Rotax			Ret					19	26	10		1
	(France) Jean-Louis Tournadre	Sonauto Gauloises-Yamaha	YZR250	Ret	Ret	Ret	14	11	Ret	Ret			Ret	Ret	0
	(South Africa) Alan North		YZR250	Ret			DNQ	23			11	20	15		0
	(Sweden) Eilert Lundstedt		YZR250										Ret	11	0
	(Austria) Siegfried Minich		Rotax			Ret			Ret	12	Ret	Ret	Ret		0
	(France) Pierre Bolle		YZR250		12										0
	(Germany) Herbert Bessendorfer		YZR250							Ret	17	18	13		0
	(Switzerland) Edwin Weibel		YZR250		Ret	18	20		20	20	13	Ret	30	22	0
	(Netherlands) Peter Looijesteijn		Waddon				27				18	14	28		0
	(South Africa) Jimmy Rodger		YZR250	14											0
	(Italy) Paolo Ferretti		Rotax	18	20	DNQ	Ret		Ret	Ret	15	25			0
	(Italy) Maurizio Vitali		MBA			15		DNQ							0
	(Germany) Jürgen Schmid		YZR250				15								0
	(Germany) Karl-Thomas Grassel		YZR250			17	16								0
	(United Kingdom) Graham Young	EMC	EMC-Rotax			16	Ret	Ret	Ret				20		0
	(Belgium) Michel Simeon		YZR250				Ret	16				Ret	Ret		0
	(Spain) Luis Miguel Reyes	Kobas	Kobas-Rotax					17		Ret			Ret		0
	(United Kingdom) Paul Tinker		YZR250										17		0
	(Japan) Kiyotaka Sakai		YZR250				22			18			25		0
	(Belgium) Stephane Mertens		YZR250									19		19	0
	(Japan) Tadasu Ikeda		YZR250		19		24		DNS				Ret		0
	(France) Gabriel Gabria		YZR250				28	Ret	19	Ret					0
	(South Africa) Robbie Petersen		YZR250	19											0
	(Spain) Domingo Gil		YZR250					19							0
	(United Kingdom) Con Law	EMC	EMC-Rotax								20		26		0
	(South Africa) Kevin Hellyer		YZR250	20											0
	(Sweden) Micke Melander		YZR250											20	0
	(Austria) Manfred Obinger		YZR250						21	21					0
	(Canada) Alan Labrosse		YZR250										Ret	21	0
	(South Africa) Warren Bristol		YZR250	21											0
	(Italy) Massimo Broccoli		YZR250	22		Ret	Ret								0
	(Germany) Herbert Hauf		YZR250						22						0
	(South Africa) Leonard Dibon		YZR250	23											0
	(Germany) Stefan Förtsch		YZR250				23								0
	(Australia) Chris Oldfield	Armstrong-Rotax	CF250										23		0
	(Denmark) Anders Skov		YZR250											23	0
	(Spain) Toni Garcia		YZR250				DNQ	24		Ret					0
	(South Africa) Danny Bristol		YZR250	24											0
	(United Kingdom) Andy Watts	EMC	EMC-Rotax										24		0
	(Finland) Jarmo Liitia		Rotax											24	0
	(South Africa) Mike Crawford	Armstrong-Rotax	CF250	25											0
	(Netherlands) Mar Schouten		MBA				26	Ret	DNS		Ret		Ret		0
	(Belgium) Rene Delaby	Armstrong-Rotax	CF250				Ret					27	Ret	Ret	0
	(France) Eric Saul		YZR250			Ret						Ret	29	Ret	0
	(Spain) Angel Nieto		YZR250	DNQ		DNQ	Ret	Ret	Ret	Ret					0
	(Sweden) Bengt Elgh		MBA				Ret							Ret	0
	(Denmark) Leif Nielsen		Rotax							Ret				Ret	0
	(Denmark) Svend Andersson		YZR250										Ret	Ret	0
	(United Kingdom) Steve Williams		YZR250									DNQ	Ret		0
	(South Africa) Dave Petersen		Rotax	Ret											0
	(South Africa) Mario Rademeyer		YZR250	Ret											0
	(South Africa) Richard Porter		Rotax	Ret											0
	(South Africa) Robert Larney		Rotax	Ret											0
	(France) Patrick Chatelet		YZR250		Ret										0
	(France) Philippe Robles		YZR250		Ret										0
	(France) Jean Foray		YZR250		Ret										0
	(France) Patrick Igoa		YZR250		Ret										0
	(Italy) Marcellino Lucchi	SWM	SWM250			Ret									0
	(Switzerland) Constant Pittet		YZR250				Ret								0
	(Germany) Stefan Klabacher		Rotax				Ret								0
	(France) Roger Sibille		YZR250				Ret								0
	(Austria) Thomas Bacher		YZR250						Ret						0
	(Socialist Federal Republic of Yugoslavia) Bozo Janezic	Armstrong-Rotax	CF250							Ret					0
	(Australia) Jeffrey Sayle	Bartol-Yamaha	YZR250										Ret		0
	(United Kingdom) Steve Tonkin	Armstrong-Rotax	CF250										Ret		0
	(United Kingdom) Steve Wright		YZR250										Ret		0
	(United Kingdom) Pete Wild		YZR250										Ret		0
	(Italy) Stefano Caracchi		MBA										Ret		0
	(Sweden) Per Jansson		YZR250											Ret	0
	(Belgium) Paul Ramon		YZR250									DNQ			0

=== 125cc standings ===
Place	Rider	Machine	FRA (France)	NAT (Italy)	GER (Germany)	ESP (Spain)	AUT (Austria)	YUG (Socialist Federal Republic of Yugoslavia)	NED (Netherlands)	BEL (Belgium)	GBR (United Kingdom)	SWE (Sweden)	SMR (San Marino)	Points
1	(Spain) Ángel Nieto	Garelli	Ret	1	1	1	1	11	1	2	1	DNQ	Ret	102
2	(Switzerland) Bruno Kneubühler	MBA	7	5	4	5	Ret	1	3	Ret	2	1	Ret	76
3	(Italy) Eugenio Lazzarini	Garelli	Ret	2	2	2	2	DNS	7	1				67
4	(Italy) Maurizio Vitali	MBA	3	Ret	5	4	6	2	Ret	Ret	9	10	1	59
5	(Spain) Ricardo Tormo	MBA	1	4	Ret	10	11		2	3	Ret	5	Ret	52
6	(Switzerland) Hans Müller	MBA	Ret	Ret	7	6	9	Ret	6	Ret	3	6	2	43
7	(Finland) Johnny Wickström	MBA	4	17	13	Ret	7	4	5	4	Ret	4	Ret	42
8	(Italy) Pier Paolo Bianchi	Sanvenero		Ret	3	3	3	Ret	Ret	Ret	13	7	5	40
9	(Italy) Fausto Gresini	Garelli	Ret	7	6		4	Ret	10	9	6	2	Ret	37
10	(Austria) August Auinger	MBA	Ret	Ret	Ret		5	Ret	15	Ret	5	3	4	30
11	(Italy) Pierluigi Aldrovandi	MBA	9	10	15	Ret	14	5	8	Ret	10	8	3	30
12	(Germany) Gerhard Waibel	MBA	Ret	12	8		10	Ret	4	6	11	12	6	22
13	(France) Jean-Claude Selini	MBA	2	9	19	11	16	15	9	13	7	Ret	Ret	20
14	(Italy) Stefano Caracchi	MBA	Ret	8	10	7	13	3	16	10	Ret	Ret	Ret	19
15	(Argentina) Willy Perez	MBA	Ret	16	29	8	25	Ret	17	12	4	9	8	16
16	(Belgium) Lucio Pietroniro	MBA	Ret	11	9		8	6	19	5	Ret	21	Ret	16
17	(Netherlands) Henk van Kessel	MBA	Ret	19	14	9	12	Ret	14	8	8	11	7	12
18	(Italy) Ezio Gianola	MBA		3				Ret					DNS	10
19	(Denmark) Thomas Moller-Pedersen	MBA	5		33	23	DNQ	DNQ			23	DNQ	17	6
20	(Austria) Erich Klein	MBA		15	Ret	21	Ret	7	Ret	14	Ret	13	9	6
21	(Finland) Jikka Jaakkola	MBA	6						23			17		5
22	(Italy) Libero Piccirillo	MBA	15	6	17	Ret	Ret	14			Ret			5
23	(Italy) Giuseppe Ascareggi	MBA	8	Ret	28	12	24	Ret		18			Ret	3
24	(Switzerland) Stefan Dörflinger	MBA	13	Ret	12	Ret	Ret	8	11	11			Ret	3
25	(Argentina) Hugo Vignetti	MBA		Ret		13	15	9	Ret	Ret	Ret	Ret	Ret	2
26	(France) Patrick Lagrive	MBA	10											1
27	(France) Jacky Hutteau	MBA		22	26	17	17	10	20	22	Ret	Ret	12	1
28	(Netherlands) Anton Straver	MBA	Ret	21	21	15	22	12	18	Ret	14	15	10	1
	(Germany) Helmut Lichtenburg	MBA	14	Ret	25		20	13	12	16	15	16	11	0
	(Venezuela) Miguel Gonzales	MBA		13	11									0
	(Germany) Willi Hupperich	MBA	11		20									0
	(Switzerland) Peter Sommer	MBA	12		23						16	26	Ret	0
	(Belgium) Olivier Liegeois	Sanvenero		Ret	Ret				26	19	12	Ret	Ret	0
	(Germany) Alfred Waibel	Real	Ret		Ret		18		13	15				0
	(Algeria) Bady Hassaine	MBA	Ret	Ret	22	Ret		Ret		24	Ret	18	13	0
	(France) Paul Bordes	MBA		14	18	18	Ret	16	25	17	Ret	Ret	Ret	0
	(Socialist Federal Republic of Yugoslavia) Alojz Pavlic	Bartol					21	17					14	0
	(Finland) Esa Kytola	MBA	Ret	20	Ret	14				25		Ret		0
	(Finland) Jussi Hautanimi	Yamaha								20		14		0
	(Czechoslovakia) Peter Baláž	MBA											15	0
	(Spain) Antonio Boronat	MBA	19			16								0
	(Switzerland) Rolf Ruttimann†	MBA	16	Ret	Ret	Ret	23	Ret†						0
	(Venezuela) Ivan Troisi	MBA		Ret	16	Ret	Ret							0
	(Italy) Carlo Succi	MBA											16	0
	(France) Patrick Daudier	MBA	17											0
	(United Kingdom) Robin Appleyard	MBA									17			0
	(Socialist Federal Republic of Yugoslavia) Janez Pintar	MBA		25	Ret		19	Ret	21		18			0
	(Belgium) Chris Baert	MBA			34	22				27		DNQ	18	0
	(Socialist Federal Republic of Yugoslavia) Robert Hmeljak	MBA						18			24			0
	(Switzerland) Joe Genoud	MBA	18		DNQ									0
	(Italy) Dominico Brigaglia	MBA		18									DNS	0
	(Sweden) Per-Edward Carlson	MBA	Ret	24	24	19	Ret	Ret	28	21		22	Ret	0
	(Sweden) Jan Backstrom	MBA			Ret		Ret			DNQ		19		0
	(United Kingdom) Tony Smith	MBA				Ret					19			0
	(Socialist Federal Republic of Yugoslavia) Zdravko Matulja	MBA						19						0
	(Netherlands) Willem Heykoop	Sanvenero							Ret	Ret	20	DNQ		0
	(Spain) Angel del Pozo	MBA				20								0
	(Sweden) Håkon Olsson	Starol										20		0
	(Austria) Werner Schmied	MBA					DNQ				21			0
	(Netherlands) Boy van Erp	MBA							22		DNS	25		0
	(United Kingdom) Chris Leah	MBA			36	Ret					22			0
	(Spain) Andreas Sanches-Marin	MBA	Ret	23	31	Ret	26	Ret		DNQ			Ret	0
	(Belgium) Jean-Paul Leonard	MBA								23				0
	(Denmark) Henrik Rasmussen	MBA										23		0
	(Netherlands) Ton Spek	MBA							24					0
	(Sweden) Peter Karlsson	MBA										24		0
	(Netherlands) Kees van der Ven	MBA							27	26				0
	(Germany) Bernd Lauermann	MBA			27		Ret							0
	(Germany) Elfenheimer	MBA			30									0
	(Germany) Thomas Weickardt	MBA			32									0
	(Germany) Reinhard Koberstein	MBA			35									0
	(Netherlands) Hans Spaan	MBA	Ret		Ret	Ret		Ret	Ret					0
	(Italy) Massimo de Lorenzi	Minarelli					Ret	Ret					Ret	0
	(Italy) Fabio Meozzi	MBA		Ret										0
	(Germany) Norbert Peschke	MBA			Ret									0
	(Germany) Hubert Abold	Bender			Ret									0
	(Germany) Hagen Klein	FKN-Kreidler			Ret									0
	(United Kingdom) Pete Wild	MBA			Ret									0
	(Netherlands) Martin van Soest	MBA							Ret					0
	(Netherlands) Jan Eggens	EGA							Ret					0
	(Germany) Ingo Emmerich	MBA								Ret				0
	(United Kingdom) Peter Banks	MBA									Ret			0
	(United Kingdom) Bill Robertson	MBA									Ret			0
	(Austria) Hans Hummel	MBA									Ret			0
	(United Kingdom) David Fabian	Sanvenero									Ret			0
	(Sweden) Jörgen Ask	MBA										Ret		0
	(Finland) Olli Kujansuu	MBA										Ret		0
	(Finland) Juha Pakkanen	MBA										Ret		0
	(Italy) Marino Neri	MBA											Ret	0
	(Germany) Stefan Schmitt	MBA			DNQ									0
	(Socialist Federal Republic of Yugoslavia) Zdravko Ljeljak	MBA						DNQ						0

† denotes the death of a rider

=== 50cc standings ===
Place	Rider	Machine	FRA (France)	NAT (Italy)	GER (Germany)	ESP (Spain)	YUG (Socialist Federal Republic of Yugoslavia)	NED (Netherlands)	SMR (San Marino)	Points
1	(Switzerland) Stefan Dörflinger	Krauser	1	11	1	2	1	2	2	81
2	(Italy) Eugenio Lazzarini	Garelli	2	1	2	1	DNS	1	Ret	69
3	(Italy) Claudio Lusuardi	Villa	Ret	2	Ret	4	Ret	4	3	38
4	(Netherlands) Hans Spaan	Kreidler	Ret	5	6	7	2	9	6	34
5	(Netherlands) George Looijestyn	Kreidler	6	3	4	6	5	Ret	Ret	34
6	(West Germany) Hagen Klein	FKN-Kreidler	3	6	7	9	Ret	5	5	33
7	(Spain) Ricardo Tormo	Garelli					Ret	3	1	25
8	(West Germany) Rainer Kunz	FKN-Kreidler	Ret	Ret	5	10	3	7	Ret	21
9	(West Germany) Gerhard Bauer	Ziegler	Ret	Ret	3	5	7	21		20
10	(West Germany) Rainer Scheidhauer	Kreidler	11	4	Ret		6	8	10	17
10	(Netherlands) Theo Timmer	Casal	8	Ret	10	Ret	Ret	6	4	17
12	(Germany) Ingo Emmerich	Kreidler	4	8	8		Ret	Ret		14
13	(Spain) Jorge Martinez	Bultaco				3				10
14	(Socialist Federal Republic of Yugoslavia) Zdravko Matulja	Tomos	Ret	Ret	Ret		4	12	Ret	8
15	(Netherlands) Paul Rimmelzwaan	Kreidler	5	Ret	Ret	11	Ret	Ret	Ret	6
16	(Germany) Gerhard Singer	Kreidler	Ret	7	9	Ret	Ret	11	11	6
17	(Austria) Otto Machinek	Kreidler		19	11		8	14	8	6
18	(France) Paul Bordes	Moto 2L	7	10	13	13	Ret	13	Ret	5
19	(Italy) Giuseppe Ascareggi	Minarelli							7	4
20	(Netherlands) Jos Van Dongen	Kreidler	16	9	12		10	10	Ret	4
21	(Spain) Daniel Mateos	Bultaco				8				3
22	(Italy) Paolo Priori	Paolucci	Ret	16		Ret			9	2
23	(Netherlands) Hans Koopman	Kreidler	9	Ret	15			Ret	Ret	2
24	(Italy) Maurizio Stocco	Kreidler		14			9		Ret	2
25	(Italy) Massimo De Lorenzi	Minarelli	10	12	17	Ret	Ret		Ret	1
	(Italy) Claudio Granata	Kreidler		Ret			11		Ret	0
	(Spain) Ramon Gali	Bultaco	12	Ret	14	15			Ret	0
	(Germany) Thomas Engl	M1		Ret	18	Ret	12	Ret	15	0
	(Belgium) Chris Baert	Kreidler	17	17	16	18		17	12	0
	(France) Yves Le Toumelin	TYL (motorcycle)	Ret		20	12				0
	(Switzerland) Reiner Koster	M1	13	Ret	Ret	Ret	20	Ret	14	0
	(United Kingdom) Ian McConnachie	Rudge		Ret	23	16	19	Ret	13	0
	(Germany) Kasimir Rapczynski	Kreidler	Ret		22		13	Ret		0
	(Italy) Sandro de Rosa	Villa		13						0
	(Germany) Klaus Kull	Kawadrom	14		26		Ret			0
	(Spain) Joaquin Gali	Bultaco	Ret	Ret	Ret	14		Ret	Ret	0
	(Socialist Federal Republic of Yugoslavia) Mijo Lijsak	Kreidler					14			0
	(Germany) Stefan Kurfiss	Kreidler			27		15			0
	(Germany) Hans-Joachim Ritter	Kreidler	15		Ret			Ret		0
	(Italy) Guido Sala	MTK		15						0
	(Netherlands) Bert Smit	PRS						15		0
	(Finland) Mika-Sakari Komu	Kreidler	18		25		16	19	17	0
	(Italy) Giuliano Tabanelli	Kreidler		Ret					16	0
	(Netherlands) Rini Vrijdag	Kreidler						16		0
	(Portugal) Henrique Sande	Moda				17				0
	(Socialist Federal Republic of Yugoslavia) Miklos Bojan	Kreidler					17			0
	(Germany) Gunter Schirnhofer	Kreidler			21			18		0
	(Austria) Hans Hummel	Sachs	Ret	Ret	30			Ret	18	0
	(Italy) Roberto Rosso	Minarelli		18						0
	(Socialist Federal Republic of Yugoslavia) T. Persic	Sever					18			0
	(Socialist Federal Republic of Yugoslavia) Peter Verbic	Kreidler		Ret	19		Ret		Ret	0
	(Italy) Nicola Casadei	Minarelli		Ret					19	0
	(France) Gerard Velay	Kreidler	19							0
	(France) Jean-Francois Verdier	Derbi				19				0
	(France) Jean-Marc Velay	Kreidler	20		DNS					0
	(Netherlands) Wim de Jong	Kreidler						20		0
	(Finland) Stefan Danielsson	Kreidler	Ret		24	Ret				0
	(Germany) Bruno Treitlein	Kawadrom			28					0
	(Italy) Massimo Fargeri	Kreidler			29				Ret	0
	(United Kingdom) Spencer Crabbe	MBA			31					0
	(Germany) Inge Arends	Schuster			32			Ret	Ret	0
	(Italy) Mauro Mordenti	Rossi		Ret			Ret			0
	(Italy) Enrico Cereda	Kreidler		Ret					Ret	0
	(Switzerland) Joe Genoud	Kreidler	Ret							0
	(France) Henri Laporte	Moto	Ret							0
	(France) Philippe Linares	SBM	Ret							0
	(France) Claude Delarbre	ABF	Ret							0
	(Italy) Ezio Saffiotti	UFO		Ret						0
	(Germany) Franz Ungar	Kreidler			Ret					0
	(Socialist Federal Republic of Yugoslavia) Lajos Horti	Kreidler					Ret			0
	(Socialist Federal Republic of Yugoslavia) Uros Tomanovic	Kreidler					Ret			0
	(Socialist Federal Republic of Yugoslavia) Radovan Stanojevic	Sever					Ret			0
	(Socialist Federal Republic of Yugoslavia) Rajko Mitrovic	Sever					Ret			0
	(Netherlands) Bertus Grinwis	Kreidler						Ret		0
	(Netherlands) Antoon Gevers	Kreidler						Ret		0
	(Germany) Lothar Dahn	Kreidler			DNQ					0
