= 1983 Nations motorcycle Grand Prix =

(Italy) 1983 Nations Grand Prix
Race details
- Race 3 of 12 races in the 1983 Grand Prix motorcycle racing season
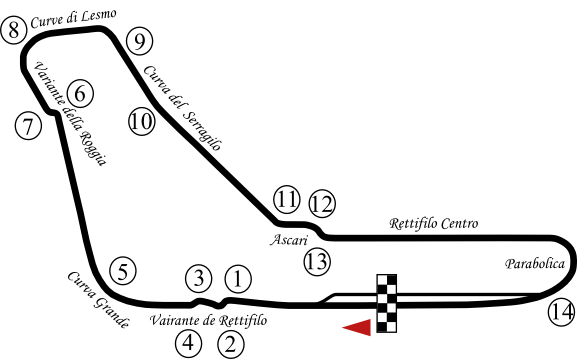
- Date: 24 April 1983
- Official name: Gran Premio delle Nazioni
- Location: Autodromo Nazionale Monza
- Course: Permanent racing facility; 5.800 km (3.604 mi)

500cc
Pole position
- Rider: (United States) Kenny Roberts
- Time: 1:52.690
Fastest lap
- Rider: (United States) Kenny Roberts
- Time: 1:52.800
Podium
- First: (United States) Freddie Spencer
- Second: (United States) Randy Mamola
- Third: (United States) Eddie Lawson

250cc
Pole position
- Rider: (France) Patrick Fernandez
- Time: 2:01.210
Fastest lap
- Rider: (Venezuela) Iván Palazzese
- Time: 2:00.570
Podium
- First: (Venezuela) Carlos Lavado
- Second: (France) Thierry Espié
- Third: (West Germany) Manfred Herweh

125cc
Pole position
- Rider: (Spain) Ángel Nieto
- Time: 2:07.570
Fastest lap
- Rider: (Spain) Ángel Nieto
- Time: 2:06.740
Podium
- First: (Spain) Ángel Nieto
- Second: (Italy) Eugenio Lazzarini
- Third: (Italy) Ezio Gianola

50cc
Pole position
- Rider: (Switzerland) Stefan Dörflinger
- Time: 2:24.560
Fastest lap
- Rider: (Italy) Eugenio Lazzarini
- Time: 2:27.760
Podium
- First: (Italy) Eugenio Lazzarini
- Second: (Italy) Claudio Lusuardi
- Third: (Netherlands) George Looijesteijn

The 1983 Nations motorcycle Grand Prix was the third race of the 1983 Grand Prix motorcycle racing season. It took place on the weekend of 22–24 April 1983 at the Autodromo Nazionale Monza.

== Classification ==
=== 500 cc ===
Pos.	Rider	Team	Machine	Time/Retired	Points
1	(United States) Freddie Spencer	HRC-Honda	NS500	45'46.570	15
2	(United States) Randy Mamola	HB Sinclair-Suzuki	RG500	+7.660	12
3	(United States) Eddie Lawson	Marlboro Agostini-Yamaha	YZR500	+17.750	10
4	(Italy) Franco Uncini	HB Gallina-Suzuki	RG500	+24.380	8
5	(Japan) Takazumi Katayama	HRC-Honda	NS500	+33.730	6
6	(France) Raymond Roche	Moto Club Paul Ricard	NS500	+42.810	5
7	(France) Marc Fontan	Sonauto Gauloises-Yamaha	YZR500	+1'16.300	4
8	(Switzerland) Sergio Pellandini	Carimati-Pezzani Racing	RG500	+1'21.860	3
9	(United Kingdom) Barry Sheene	Heron-Suzuki	RG500	+1'28.230	2
10	(Italy) Marco Lucchinelli	HRC-Honda	NS500	+1'33.180	1
11	(Italy) Virginio Ferrari	Cagiva	GP500	+1'41.530	
12	(Italy) Walter Magliorati	Moto Club Carate	RG500	+1'41.590	
13	(West Germany) Gustav Reiner	Krauter-Vertrieb Racing	RG500	+1'47.950	
14	(Sweden) Peter Sjöström	Jeb’s Helmet Sweden	RG500	+1'48.330	
15	(United Kingdom) Steve Parrish	Mitsui-Yamaha	YZR500	+1 lap	
16	(Italy) Marco Papa		RG500	+1 lap	
17	(Switzerland) Wolfgang von Muralt		RG500	+1 lap	
18	(Brazil) Marco Greco		RG500	+1 lap	
19	(Italy) Lorenzo Ghiselli		RG500	+1 lap	
20	(Italy) Paolo Ferretti		RG500	+1 lap	
21	(Switzerland) Andreas Hofmann		RG500	+1 lap	
22	(Italy) Leandro Becheroni		RG500	+1 lap	
23	(Italy) Corrado Tuzii	Beton Bloc Racing	RS500	+1 lap	
24	(United Kingdom) Chris Guy		RG500	+1 lap	
25	(Austria) Franz Kaserer		RG500	+2 laps	
26	(Switzerland) Peter Huber		RG500	+2 laps	
Ret	(United States) Kenny Roberts	Marlboro Agostini Yamaha	YZR500	Retired	
Ret	(United Kingdom) Ron Haslam	HRC-Honda	NS500	Retired	
Ret	(Italy) Gianni Pelletier	Hirt Giapauto-Honda	RS500	Retired	
Ret	(West Germany) Ernst Gschwender	MO Motul Racing Team	RG500	Retired	
Ret	(United Kingdom) Dave Dean		RS500	Retired	
Ret	(Netherlands) Boet van Dulmen	Shell Nederland-Suzuki	RG500	Retired	
Ret	(Switzerland) Alain Rothlisberger		YZR500	Retired	
Ret	(United Kingdom) Keith Huewen	Heron-Suzuki	RG500	Retired	
Ret	(Netherlands) Jack Middelburg	Stichting Ned-Honda	RS500	Retired	
Ret	(Switzerland) Philippe Coulon	Marlboro-Suzuki	RG500	Retired	
DNS	(Belgium) Didier de Radiguès	Team Johnson Elf	RS500	Did not start	
DNQ	(South Africa) Jon Ekerold	Cagiva	GP500	Did not qualify	

Previous race: 1983 French Grand Prix	FIM Grand Prix World Championship; 1983 season	Next race: 1983 German Grand Prix
Previous race: 1982 Nations Grand Prix	Nations Grand Prix	Next race: 1984 Nations Grand Prix
