= 1983 Yugoslavian motorcycle Grand Prix =

Motorcycle race

(Socialist Federal Republic of Yugoslavia) 1983 Yugoslavian Grand Prix
Race details
- Race 7 of 12 races in the 1983 Grand Prix motorcycle racing season
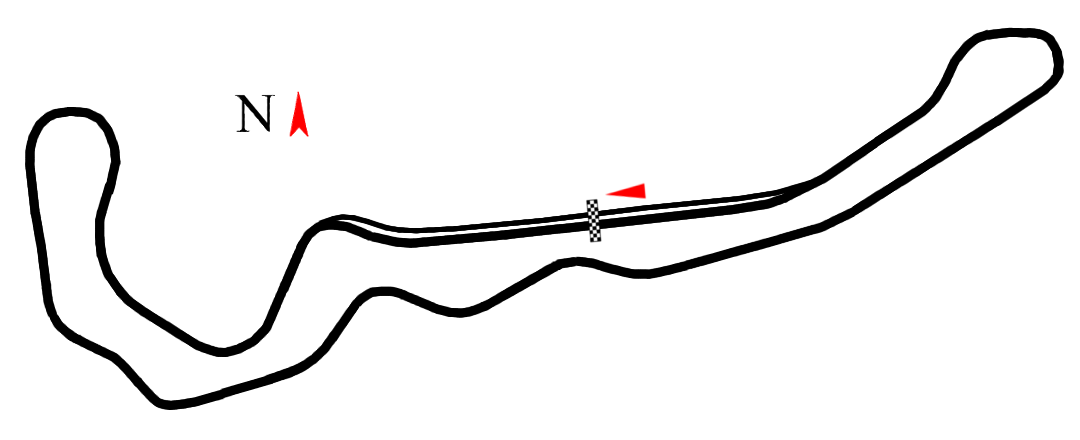
- Date: 12 June 1983
- Official name: Yu Grand Prix
- Location: Automotodrom Rijeka
- Course: Permanent racing facility; 4.168 km (2.590 mi)

500cc
Pole position
- Rider: (United States) Freddie Spencer
- Time: 1:32.270
Fastest lap
- Rider: (United States) Freddie Spencer
- Time: 1:33.360
Podium
- First: (United States) Freddie Spencer
- Second: (United States) Randy Mamola
- Third: (United States) Eddie Lawson

250cc
Pole position
- Rider: (Belgium) Didier de Radiguès
- Time: 1:36.064
Fastest lap
- Rider: (France) Christian Sarron
- Time: 1:36.600
Podium
- First: (Venezuela) Carlos Lavado
- Second: (France) Christian Sarron
- Third: (West Germany) Manfred Herweh

125cc
Pole position
- Rider: (Italy) Fausto Gresini
- Time: 1:41.547
Fastest lap
- Rider: (Switzerland) Bruno Kneubühler
- Time: 1:41.080
Podium
- First: (Switzerland) Bruno Kneubühler
- Second: (Italy) Maurizio Vitali
- Third: (Italy) Stefano Caracchi

50cc
Pole position
- Rider: (Switzerland) Stefan Dörflinger
- Time: 1:50.123
Fastest lap
- Rider: (Spain) Ricardo Tormo
- Time: 1:49.980
Podium
- First: (Switzerland) Stefan Dörflinger
- Second: (Netherlands) Hans Spaan
- Third: (West Germany) Rainer Kunz

The 1983 Yugoslavian motorcycle Grand Prix was the seventh round of the 1983 Grand Prix motorcycle racing season. It took place on the weekend of 10–12 June 1983 at the Automotodrom Rijeka.

== Classification ==
=== 500 cc ===
Pos.	Rider	Team	Machine	Time/Retired	Points
1	(United States) Freddie Spencer	HRC-Honda	NS500	50'19.820	15
2	(United States) Randy Mamola	HB Sinclair-Suzuki	RG500	+7.410	12
3	(United States) Eddie Lawson	Marlboro Agostini-Yamaha	YZR500	+19.860	10
4	(United States) Kenny Roberts	Marlboro Agostini Yamaha	YZR500	+26.320	8
5	(Japan) Takazumi Katayama	HRC-Honda	NS500	+47.160	6
6	(France) Marc Fontan	Sonauto Gauloises-Yamaha	YZR500	+57.670	5
7	(Netherlands) Boet van Dulmen	Shell Nederland-Suzuki	RG500	+1'09.140	4
8	(Italy) Gianni Pelletier	HIRT Giapauto-Honda	RS500	+1'14.800	3
9	(Italy) Marco Lucchinelli	HRC-Honda	NS500	+1'15.140	2
10	(Switzerland) Sergio Pellandini	Carimati-Pezzani Racing	RG500	+1'37.040	1
11	(Netherlands) Jack Middelburg	Stichting Ned-Honda	RS500	+1 lap	
12	(Italy) Walter Magliorati	Moto Club Carate	RG500	+1 lap	
13	(United Kingdom) Barry Sheene	Heron-Suzuki	RG500	+1 lap	
14	(Switzerland) Philippe Coulon	Marlboro-Suzuki	RG500	+1 lap	
15	(Switzerland) Wolfgang von Muralt		RG500	+1 lap	
16	(France) Franck Gross		RG500	+1 lap	
17	(West Germany) Gustav Reiner		RG500	+1 lap	
18	(Italy) Fabio Biliotti	Moto Club Condor	RS500	+1 lap	
19	(Finland) Eero Hyvärinen		RG500	+1 lap	
20	(Norway) Beni Slydal		RG500	+1 lap	
21	(West Germany) Ernst Gschwender	MO Motul Racing Team	RG500	+1 lap	
22	(Switzerland) Peter Huber		RG500	+2 laps	
23	(United Kingdom) Chris Guy		RG500	+2 laps	
24	(Austria) Franz Kaserer		RG500	+2 laps	
25	(Austria) Josef Ragginger		RG500	+2 laps	
Ret	(Brazil) Marco Greco		RG500	Retired	
Ret	(Italy) Maurizio Massimiani	HIRT Italia	RS500	Retired	
Ret	(Italy) Franco Uncini	HB Gallina-Suzuki	RG500	Retired	
Ret	(United Kingdom) Keith Huewen	Heron-Suzuki	RG500	Retired	
Ret	(Greece) Dimitris Papandreou		YZR500	Retired	
Ret	(United Kingdom) Ron Haslam	HRC-Honda	NS500	Retired	
Ret	(Denmark) Børge Nielsen		RG500	Retired	
DNS	(Italy) Leandro Becheroni		RG500	Did not start	
DNS	(France) Raymond Roche	Moto Club Paul Ricard	NS500	Did not start	
DNS	(Italy) Virginio Ferrari	Cagiva	GP500	Did not start	

Previous race: 1983 Austrian Grand Prix	FIM Grand Prix World Championship; 1983 season	Next race: 1983 Dutch TT
Previous race: 1982 Yugoslavian Grand Prix	Yugoslavian Grand Prix	Next race: 1984 Yugoslavian Grand Prix
