= 1983 Spanish motorcycle Grand Prix =

Motorsport event

(Spain) 1983 Spanish Grand Prix
Race details
- Race 5 of 12 races in the 1983 Grand Prix motorcycle racing season
- Date: 22 May 1983
- Official name: Marlboro Gran Premio de España de Motociclismo
- Location: Circuito Permanente del Jarama
- Course: Permanent racing facility; 3.404 km (2.115 mi)

500cc
Pole position
- Rider: (United States) Freddie Spencer
- Time: 1:29.870
Fastest lap
- Rider: (United States) Kenny Roberts
- Time: 1:29.570
Podium
- First: (United States) Freddie Spencer
- Second: (United States) Kenny Roberts
- Third: (Japan) Takazumi Katayama

250cc
Pole position
- Rider: (France) Jean-François Baldé
- Time: 1:33.350
Fastest lap
- Rider: (France) Jean-François Baldé
- Time: 1:33.240
Podium
- First: (France) Hervé Guilleux
- Second: (France) Christian Sarron
- Third: (West Germany) Martin Wimmer

125cc
Pole position
- Rider: (Italy) Maurizio Vitali
- Time: 1:38.470
Fastest lap
- Rider: (Italy) Eugenio Lazzarini
- Time: 1:38.490
Podium
- First: (Spain) Ángel Nieto
- Second: (Italy) Eugenio Lazzarini
- Third: (Italy) Pier Paolo Bianchi

50cc
Pole position
- Rider: (Italy) Eugenio Lazzarini
- Time: 1:46.760
Fastest lap
- Rider: (Italy) Eugenio Lazzarini
- Time: 1:47.070
Podium
- First: (Italy) Eugenio Lazzarini
- Second: (Switzerland) Stefan Dörflinger
- Third: (Spain) Jorge Martínez

The 1983 Spanish motorcycle Grand Prix was the fifth round of the 1983 Grand Prix motorcycle racing season. It took place on the weekend of 20–22 May 1983 at the Circuito Permanente del Jarama.

== Classification ==
=== 500 cc ===
Pos.	Rider	Team	Machine	Time/Retired	Points
1	(United States) Freddie Spencer	HRC-Honda	NS500	56'17.460	15
2	(United States) Kenny Roberts	Marlboro Agostini-Yamaha	YZR500	+0.550	12
3	(Japan) Takazumi Katayama	HRC-Honda	NS500	+32.450	10
4	(United States) Randy Mamola	HB Sinclair-Suzuki	RG500	+1'05.200	8
5	(Italy) Franco Uncini	HB Gallina-Suzuki	RG500	+1'15.620	6
6	(United States) Eddie Lawson	Marlboro Agostini Yamaha	YZR500	+1'17.480	5
7	(France) Marc Fontan	Sonauto Gauloises-Yamaha	YZR500	+1'33.200	4
8	(Netherlands) Jack Middelburg	Stichting Ned-Honda	RS500	+1 lap	3
9	(Switzerland) Sergio Pellandini	Carimati-Pezzani Racing	RG500	+1 lap	2
10	(United Kingdom) Keith Huewen	Heron-Suzuki	RG500	+1 lap	1
11	(Netherlands) Boet van Dulmen	Shell Nederland-Suzuki	RG500	+1 lap	
12	(Italy) Gianni Pelletier	HIRT Giapauto-Honda	RS500	+1 lap	
13	(Belgium) Didier de Radiguès	Team Johnson Elf	RS500	+1 lap	
14	(West Germany) Gustav Reiner		RG500	+1 lap	
15	(United Kingdom) Steve Parrish	Mitsui-Yamaha	YZR500	+1 lap	
16	(Italy) Fabio Biliotti	Moto Club Condor	RS500	+1 lap	
17	(Switzerland) Philippe Coulon	Marlboro-Suzuki	RG500	+1 lap	
18	(United Kingdom) Chris Guy		RG500	+2 laps	
19	(Italy) Corrado Tuzii	Beton Bloc Racing	RS500	+2 laps	
20	(Spain) Francisco Rico		RG500	+2 laps	
21	(Spain) Carlos Morante		YZR500	+2 laps	
22	(West Germany) Alfons Ammerschläger	Skoal Bandit Heron Suzuki	RG500	+2 laps	
23	(Spain) José Parra		RG500	+2 laps	
Ret	(Switzerland) Andreas Hofmann		RG500	Retired	
Ret	(France) Raymond Roche	Moto Club Paul Ricard	NS500	Retired	
Ret	(Switzerland) Wolfgang von Muralt		RG500	Retired	
Ret	(United Kingdom) Ron Haslam	HRC-Honda	NS500	Retired	
Ret	(Spain) Grino Marco		RG500	Retired	
Ret	(Brazil) Marco Greco		RG500	Retired	
Ret	(Italy) Marco Lucchinelli	HRC-Honda	NS500	Retired	
DNS	(Italy) Leandro Becheroni		RG500	Did not start	

Previous race: 1983 German Grand Prix	FIM Grand Prix World Championship; 1983 season	Next race: 1983 Austrian Grand Prix
Previous race: 1982 Spanish Grand Prix	Spanish Grand Prix	Next race: 1984 Spanish Grand Prix
