= 1983 French motorcycle Grand Prix =

(France) 1983 French Grand Prix
Race details
- Race 2 of 12 races in the 1983 Grand Prix motorcycle racing season
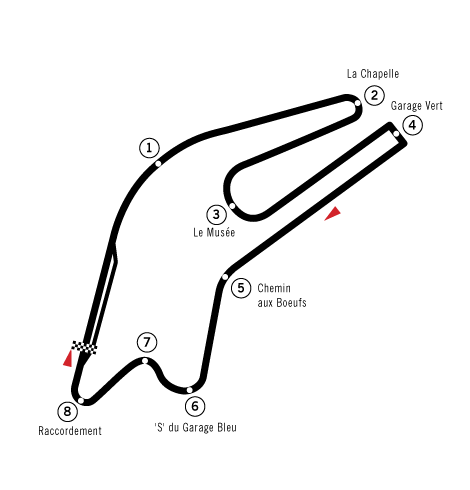
- Date: 3 April 1983
- Official name: Grand Prix de France
- Location: Bugatti Circuit
- Course: Permanent racing facility; 4.240 km (2.635 mi)

500cc
Pole position
- Rider: (United States) Kenny Roberts
- Time: 1:36.800
Fastest lap
- Rider: (United States) Freddie Spencer
- Time: 1:37.500
Podium
- First: (United States) Freddie Spencer
- Second: (Italy) Marco Lucchinelli
- Third: (United Kingdom) Ron Haslam

250cc
Pole position
- Rider: (France) Christian Sarron
- Time: 1:42.970
Fastest lap
- Rider: (United Kingdom) Alan Carter
- Time: 1:43.850
Podium
- First: (United Kingdom) Alan Carter
- Second: (Switzerland) Jacques Cornu
- Third: (France) Thierry Rapicault

125cc
Pole position
- Rider: (Spain) Ricardo Tormo
- Time: 1:51.240
Fastest lap
- Rider: (Italy) Pierluigi Aldrovandi
- Time: 2:00.250
Podium
- First: (Spain) Ricardo Tormo
- Second: (France) Jean-Claude Selini
- Third: (Italy) Maurizio Vitali

50cc
Pole position
- Rider: (Switzerland) Stefan Dörflinger
Fastest lap
- Rider: (Switzerland) Stefan Dörflinger
Podium
- First: (Switzerland) Stefan Dörflinger
- Second: (Italy) Eugenio Lazzarini
- Third: (West Germany) Hagen Klein

Sidecar (B2A)
Pole position
- Rider: (Switzerland) Rolf Biland
- Passenger: (Switzerland) Kurt Waltisperg
Fastest lap
- Rider: (Switzerland) Rolf Biland
- Passenger: (Switzerland) Kurt Waltisperg
Podium
- First rider: (Switzerland) Rolf Biland
- First passenger: (Switzerland) Kurt Waltisperg
- Second rider: (United Kingdom) Mick Barton
- Second passenger: (United Kingdom) Simon Birchall
- Third rider: (West Germany) Werner Schwärzel
- Third passenger: (West Germany) Andreas Huber

The 1983 French motorcycle Grand Prix was the second round of the 1983 Grand Prix motorcycle racing season. It took place on the weekend of 2–3 April 1983 at the Bugatti Circuit in Le Mans.

This race was remembered for two fatal accidents that occurred over the weekend in the 500cc class. The first occurred during Friday practice when Italian rider Loris Reggiani collided with Japanese rider Iwao Ishikawa. Ishikawa died shortly after from severe injuries. In the race itself, defending winner Michel Frutschi crashed heavily and was taken to hospital, but later died.

== Classification ==
=== 500 cc ===
| Pos. | Rider | Team | Manufacturer | Time/Retired | Points |
|---|---|---|---|---|---|
| 1 | (United States) Freddie Spencer | HRC-Honda | NS500 | 47'47.900 | 15 |
| 2 | (Italy) Marco Lucchinelli | HRC-Honda | NS500 | +14.990 | 12 |
| 3 | (United Kingdom) Ron Haslam | HRC-Honda | NS500 | +36.280 | 10 |
| 4 | (United States) Kenny Roberts | Marlboro Agostini-Yamaha | YZR500 | +44.110 | 8 |
| 5 | (United Kingdom) Keith Huewen | Heron-Suzuki | RG500 | +44.850 | 6 |
| 6 | (France) Marc Fontan | Sonauto Gauloises-Yamaha | YZR500 | +45.720 | 5 |
| 7 | (United Kingdom) Barry Sheene | Heron Suzuki | RG500 | +46.090 | 4 |
| 8 | (Italy) Guido Paci | | RS500 | +1'30.190 | 3 |
| 9 | (Switzerland) Sergio Pellandini | Carimati-Pezzani Racing | RG500 | +1'33.850 | 2 |
| 10 | (Netherlands) Jack Middelburg | Stichting Ned-Honda | RS500 | +1'35.820 | 1 |
| 11 | (Switzerland) Wolfgang von Muralt | | RG500 | +1'39.650 | |
| 12 | (Switzerland) Philippe Coulon | Marlboro-Suzuki | RG500 | +1'43.140 | |
| 13 | (Sweden) Peter Sjöström | Jeb's Helmet Sweden | RG500 | +1 lap | |
| 14 | (Italy) Maurizio Massimiani | Honda Italia | RS500 | +1 lap | |
| 15 | (France) Louis-Luc Maisto | | RG500 | +1 lap | |
| 16 | (Italy) Walter Magliorati | Moto Club Carate | RG500 | +1 lap | |
| 17 | (New Zealand) Stuart Avant | | RG500 | +1 lap | |
| 18 | (West Germany) Ernst Gschwender | MO Motul Racing Team | RG500 | +1 lap | |
| 19 | (South Africa) Jon Ekerold | Cagiva | GP500 | +3 laps | |
| Ret | (Italy) Paolo Ferretti | | YZR500 | Accident | |
| Ret | (Switzerland) Alain Röthlisberger | | YZR500 | Retirement | |
| Ret | (Brazil) Marco Greco | | RG500 | Accident | |
| Ret | (United Kingdom) Steve Parrish | Mitsui-Yamaha | YZR500 | Accident | |
| Ret | (United Kingdom) Chris Guy | | RG500 | Accident | |
| Ret | (Finland) Eero Hyvärinen | | RG500 | Retirement | |
| Ret | (Italy) Virginio Ferrari | Cagiva | GP500 | Retirement | |
| Ret | (Italy) Leandro Becheroni | | RG500 | Accident | |
| Ret | (Switzerland) Michel Frutschi | Honda Switzerland | RS500 | Fatal accident | |
| Ret | (Belgium) Didier de Radiguès | Team Johnson Elf | RS500 | Accident | |
| Ret | (Italy) Franco Uncini | HB Gallina-Suzuki | RG500 | Accident | |
| Ret | (France) Raymond Roche | Moto Club Paul Ricard | RS500 | Retired | |
| Ret | (West Germany) Gustav Reiner | | RG500 | Accident | |
| Ret | (United States) Eddie Lawson | Marlboro Agostini Yamaha | YZR500 | Collision | |
| Ret | (United States) Randy Mamola | HB Sinclair-Suzuki | RG500 | Collision | |
| Ret | (France) Jean Lafond | Claude Fior | Fior | Accident | |
| Ret | (Switzerland) Andreas Hofmann | | RG500 | Accident | |
| DNS | (Netherlands) Boet van Dulmen | Shell Nederland-Suzuki | RG500 | Injury | |
| DNS | (Japan) Iwao Ishikawa | | RS500 | Fatal accident | |
| DNS | (Japan) Takazumi Katayama | HRC-Honda | NS500 | Injury | |

| Previous race: 1983 South African Grand Prix | FIM Grand Prix World Championship; 1983 season | Next race: 1983 Nations Grand Prix |
| Previous race: 1982 French Grand Prix | French Grand Prix | Next race: 1984 French Grand Prix |
