= 1983 German motorcycle Grand Prix =

(West Germany) 1983 German Grand Prix
Race details
- Race 4 of 12 races in the 1983 Grand Prix motorcycle racing season
- Date: 8 May 1983
- Official name: Großer Preis von Deutschland
- Location: Hockenheimring
- Course: Permanent racing facility; 6.789 km (4.218 mi)

500cc
Pole position
- Rider: (United States) Freddie Spencer
- Time: 2:08.660
Fastest lap
- Rider: (Japan) Takazumi Katayama
- Time: 2:10.480
Podium
- First: (United States) Kenny Roberts
- Second: (Japan) Takazumi Katayama
- Third: (Italy) Marco Lucchinelli

250cc
Pole position
- Rider: (Switzerland) Jacques Cornu
- Time: 2:20.100
Fastest lap
- Rider: (Venezuela) Carlos Lavado
- Time: 2:23.610
Podium
- First: (Venezuela) Carlos Lavado
- Second: (France) Patrick Fernandez
- Third: (Belgium) Didier de Radiguès

125cc
Pole position
- Rider: (Italy) Eugenio Lazzarini
- Time: 2:27.760
Fastest lap
- Rider: (Spain) Ángel Nieto
- Time: 2:26.000
Podium
- First: (Spain) Ángel Nieto
- Second: (Italy) Eugenio Lazzarini
- Third: (Italy) Pier Paolo Bianchi

50cc
Pole position
- Rider: (Switzerland) Stefan Dörflinger
- Time: 2:47.730
Fastest lap
- Rider: (Switzerland) Stefan Dörflinger
- Time: 2:46.050
Podium
- First: (Switzerland) Stefan Dörflinger
- Second: (Italy) Eugenio Lazzarini
- Third: (West Germany) Gerhard Bauer

The 1983 German motorcycle Grand Prix was the fourth round of the 1983 Grand Prix motorcycle racing season. It took place on the weekend of 6–8 May 1983 at the Hockenheimring.

== Classification ==
=== 500 cc ===
Pos.	Rider	Team	Machine	Time/Retired	Points
1	(United States) Kenny Roberts	Marlboro Agostini-Yamaha	YZR500	32'54.400	15
2	(Japan) Takazumi Katayama	HRC-Honda	NS500	+7.370	12
3	(Italy) Marco Lucchinelli	HRC-Honda	NS500	+8.310	10
4	(United States) Freddie Spencer	HRC-Honda	NS500	+14.220	8
5	(Italy) Franco Uncini	HB Gallina-Suzuki	RG500	+23.860	6
6	(France) Marc Fontan	Sonauto Gauloises-Yamaha	YZR500	+24.800	5
7	(France) Raymond Roche	Moto Club Paul Ricard	NS500	+26.640	4
8	(United States) Randy Mamola	HB Sinclair-Suzuki	RG500	+26.820	3
9	(United States) Eddie Lawson	Marlboro Agostini Yamaha	YZR500	+37.870	2
10	(Netherlands) Boet van Dulmen	Shell Nederland-Suzuki	RG500	+38.450	1
11	(Netherlands) Jack Middelburg	Stichting Ned-Honda	RS500	+40.630	
12	(Italy) Leandro Becheroni		RG500	+57.830	
13	(Italy) Gianni Pelletier	Hirt Giapauto-Honda	RS500	+1'01.060	
14	(Italy) Walter Magliorati	Moto Club Carate	RG500	+1'18.940	
15	(Sweden) Peter Sjöström	Jeb’s Helmet Sweden	RG500	+1'22.430	
16	(West Germany) Gustav Reiner		RG500	+1'32.500	
17	(United Kingdom) Keith Huewen	Heron-Suzuki	RG500	+1'23.620	
18	(United Kingdom) Steve Parrish	Mitsui-Yamaha	YZR500	+1'37.010	
19	(West Germany) Ernst Gschwender	MO Motul Racing Team	RG500	+1'46.700	
20	(Switzerland) Andreas Hofmann		RG500	+1'47.150	
21	(Switzerland) Wolfgang von Muralt		RG500	+2'06.400	
22	(Italy) Fabio Biliotti	Moto Club Condor	RS500	+2'10.520	
23	(Switzerland) Philippe Coulon	Marlboro-Suzuki	RG500	+2'12.800	
24	(Netherlands) Henk de Vries	Henk de Vries Motoren	RG500	+2'17.800	
25	(United Kingdom) Chris Guy		RG500	+2'20.590	
26	(United Kingdom) Dave Dean		RG500	+2'27.580	
27	(United States) Wolfgang Schwarz	ES Motorradzubeh Racing Team	RG500	+2'29.920	
28	(Italy) Corrado Tuzii	Beton Bloc Racing	RS500	+2'30.960	
29	(Italy) Paolo Ferretti		RS500	+3'06.210	
30	(New Zealand) Stuart Avant		RG500	+1 lap	
31	(Brazil) Marco Greco		RG500	+1 lap	
32	(Switzerland) Alain Rothlisberger		YZR500	+1 lap	
33	(Switzerland) Peter Huber		RG500	+1 lap	
34	(New Zealand) Dennis Ireland		RG500	+1 lap	
35	(West Germany) Dieter Klopfer		DIKO	+2 laps	
Ret	(United Kingdom) Barry Sheene	Heron-Suzuki	RG500	Retired	
Ret	(United Kingdom) Ron Haslam	HRC-Honda	NS500	Retired	
Ret	(Netherlands) Harry Heutmekers		RG500	Retired	
Ret	(Italy) Virginio Ferrari	Cagiva	GP500	Retired	
Ret	(Switzerland) Sergio Pellandini	Carimati-Pezzani Racing	RG500	Retired	
Ret	(Switzerland) Walter Hoffmann	Deutsche Tecalemit	RG500	Retired	
Ret	(West Germany) Gerhard Treusch	ES Motorradzubeh Racing Team	RG500	Retired	
Ret	(West Germany) Alfons Ammerschläger	Skoal Bandit Heron Suzuki	RG500	Retired	
Ret	(West Germany) Klaus Klein	Dieter Braun Team	RG500	Retired	
Ret	(Austria) Franz Kaserer		RG500	Retired	
Ret	(France) Jean Lafond		RG500	Retired	
Ret	(Denmark) Børge Nielsen		RG500	Retired	
Ret	(United Kingdom) Glenn Williams		YZR500	Retired	
DNS	(Belgium) Didier de Radiguès	Team Johnson Elf	RS500	Did not start	

Previous race: 1983 Nations Grand Prix	FIM Grand Prix World Championship; 1983 season	Next race: 1983 Spanish Grand Prix
Previous race: 1982 German Grand Prix	German Grand Prix	Next race: 1984 German Grand Prix
