= South African Grand Prix (disambiguation) =

South African Grand Prix can refer to:

- South African Grand Prix, a Formula One motor race
  - Individual iterations of the motorcycle Grand Prix, listed at Category:South African Grand Prix
- South African motorcycle Grand Prix
  - Individual iterations of the motorcycle Grand Prix, listed at Category:South African motorcycle Grand Prix

== See also ==
- ISU Junior Grand Prix in South Africa
