= Keith Huewen =

British motorcycle racer

- Nationality: British
- Born: 23 August 1956 (age 70); Southend-on-Sea, Essex, England, UK
Motorcycle racing career statistics
Grand Prix motorcycle racing
Active years	1979 – 1985
First race	1979 British Grand Prix
Last race	1985 British Grand Prix
Team(s)	Honda, Suzuki, Yamaha
Championships	0
Starts / Wins / Podiums / Poles / F. laps / Points; 35 / 0 / 1 / 0 / 0 / 49
Isle of Man TT career
TTs contested	1 (1981)
TT wins	0
TT podiums	0

Keith Alan Huewen (born 23 August 1956 in Southend-on-Sea, Essex) is an English former professional Grand Prix motorbike road racer, and ex sports commentator with BT Sport where he primarily commentated on MotoGP. Huewen lives in Northampton and is a serving member on the board of Riders for Health a charity founded by motorcycle grand prix enthusiasts and headed by Anne, Princess Royal.

His uncle was the motorcycle speedway rider Alan Cowland.

== Motorcycle Grand Prix results ==
**Position**	1	2	3	4	5	6	7	8	9	10
**Points**	15	12	10	8	6	5	4	3	2	1

(key) (Races in bold indicate pole position; races in italics indicate fastest lap)

Year	Class	Team	1	2	3	4	5	6	7	8	9	10	11	12	13	Points	Rank
1979	500 cc	Yamaha	VEN	AUT	GER	NAT	ESP	YUG	NED	BEL	SWE	FIN	GBR; 15	FRA		0	—
1980	350 cc	Yamaha	NAT	FRA	NED	GBR; 6	CZE	GER; 10								6	18th
1981	350 cc	Yamaha	ARG	AUT; 6	GER; 4	NAT		YUG	NED; 7			GBR; 2			CZE	29	6th
1981	500 cc	Suzuki		AUT	GER	NAT	FRA	YUG	NED	BEL; 13	RSM; 10	GBR	FIN	SWE	CZE	1	=26th
1983	500 cc	Suzuki	RSA	FRA; 5	NAT; NC	GER; 17	ESP; 10	AUT; 12	YUG; NC	NED; NC	BEL; 11	GBR; 11	SWE; 11	RSM; NC		7	15th
1984	500 cc	Honda	RSA	NAT; 19	ESP; 10	AUT; 13	GER; 8	FRA; 14	YUG	NED; 13	BEL; NC	GBR; 13	SWE; 9	SMR; 21		6	19th
1985	500 cc	Honda	RSA; 19	ESP	GER; 30	NAT; NC	AUT; 23	YUG	NED	BEL	FRA	GBR; NC	SWE	SMR		0	—
