= Bollé =

Bollé may refer to:

- Bollé, Burkina Faso, a village in Burkina Faso
- Bollé Brands, a safety eyewear/sunglasses manufacturer
- Hermann Bollé (1845–1926), Austrian architect
- Jacques Bolle (born 1959), French Grand Prix motorcycle road racer
- Mount Bolle, Antarctica

== See also ==
- Bollée (disambiguation)
- Bolle (disambiguation)
