= Bollea =

Bollea may refer to:

- Pescatoria, a genus of orchid, formerly named Bollea
- Terry Gene Bollea (Hulk Hogan), wrestler
- Michael Allan Bollea (Horace Hogan), wrestler and nephew of Hulk Hogan
- Brooke Ellen Bollea (Brooke Hogan), reality TV personality and daughter of Hulk Hogan
- Nicholas Allen Bollea (Nick Hogan), reality TV personality and son of Hulk Hogan

== See also ==
- Bollea v. Gawker, a 2013 sex tape publicity lawsuit
- Bollée (disambiguation)
