= Carl Bolle =

Carl Bolle or Karl Bolle may refer to:

- Carl Bolle (naturalist) (also as Karl Bolle) (1821–1909), German naturalist whose standard abbreviation as a botanist is "Bolle"
- Carl Bolle (entrepreneur) (1832–1910), German entrepreneur and diarist
- Karl Bolle (flying ace) (1893–1955), German entrepreneur and flying ace

== See also ==
- Bolle (disambiguation)
