= Bolle =

Bolle may refer to:

== People ==
- Eivind Bolle (born 1923), Norwegian politician for the Labour Party
- Frank Bolle (born 1924), American cartoonist
- Friedrich Franz Bolle (1905–1999), whose standard abbreviation as a botanist is "F. Bolle"
- Pierette Cornelie Bolle (1893–1945), whose standard abbreviation as a botanist is "P. C. Bolle"; see Marie-Anne Libert § Botany and mycology
- Roberto Bolle (born 1975), Italian ballet dancer

== Other uses ==
- Bolle's pigeon, named after the naturalist Carl Bolle
- Bolle (Supermarkt), a defunct German supermarket chain; see May Day in Kreuzberg § The riots
- Dairy C. Bolle, a defunct German dairy

== See also ==
- Carl Bolle (disambiguation)
- Karl Bolle (disambiguation)
- Bollé (disambiguation)
