= Bollée =

Bollée may refer to:

- Éolienne Bollée, an unusual wind turbine
- Amédée Bollée (1844–1917), a French bellfounder and automobile pioneer
- Annegret Bollée (born 1937), German linguist and academic
- Léon Bollée (1870–1913), a French automobile manufacturer and inventor
  - Léon Bollée Automobiles
- Stade Léon-Bollée, a multi-purpose stadium in Le Mans, France

== See also ==
- Bollé (disambiguation)
- Bollea (disambiguation)
