= South African motorcycle Grand Prix =

Motorcycle race held in South Africa

South African Grand Prix

Grand Prix motorcycle racing
- Venue: Phakisa Freeway (1999–2004); Kyalami (1983–1985, 1992)
- First race: 1983
- Last race: 2004
- Most wins (rider): Valentino Rossi (3)
- Most wins (manufacturer): Honda (10)

The South African motorcycle Grand Prix was a motorcycling event that had been part of the Grand Prix motorcycle racing world championship, held intermittently from 1983 to 2004.

== History ==
The first South African Grand Prix was held in 1983 as the season opener at the Kyalami circuit in Midrand. The circuit lay more than 1700 metres above sea level and the high altitude caused problems for the riders to set up their bikes. The race was held on a Saturday, similar to the Dutch TT. In 1984 the races were plagued by bad weather conditions, resulting in many accidents. The race in 1985 was the final to be held at the old Kyalami circuit before it was removed for the 1986 season due to the Apartheid policies which were in place in the country at the time. These policies prompted the subsequent boycott from many sport associations (such as the FIM and the FIA), which refused to race in the country until the lift of these bans in the early 1990s.

After the Apartheid policies were abolished and the FIM removed the restrictions for South African riders and venues, the round returned on the calendar in 1992 on a new and shortened variant of the Kyalami circuit. The race was placed on a Sunday timeslot compared to the previous three South African GPs, which were held on a Saturday. However, due to ongoing financial and political problems going on in the country, it was decided to cancel the 1993 installment of the race which was planned for 3 October that year. This decision was made at the 1993 Italian Grand Prix.

In 1999, the South African Grand Prix returned. The venue chosen was the Phakisa Freeway in Welkom. In the 2002 event, the South African Department of Health announced a week before the Grand Prix that it was no longer allowed to advertise tobacco products in motorsports. This caused a big problem because that year's official sponsor of the race was French cigarette brand Gauloises. All the posters and programs - who were already printed and ready for distribution - had to be thrown away and quickly altered and all the teams who were sponsored by tobacco companies that year were forced to order new and censored stickers for the bikes, overalls for the riders, team clothing for the crewmembers and more. This caused significant financial damage as a result. In 2003, the start of the MotoGP race was delayed for almost one hour to clean up an oil spill from Kenny Roberts Jr.'s Suzuki. The 2004 race was the final South African Grand Prix so far and saw Valentino Rossi and Max Biaggi famously battle for the victory.

== Official names and sponsors ==
- 1983: Nashua Motorcycle Grand Prix
- 1984: Technics Motorcycle Grand Prix
- 1985: National Panasonic Motorcycle Grand Prix
- 1992: Nashua South African Grand Prix
- 1999: South African Grand Prix (no official sponsor)
- 2000–2001: Gauloises Africa's Grand Prix
- 2002: Africa's Grand Prix (no official sponsor)
- 2003: Arnette Africa's Grand Prix
- 2004: betandwin.com Africa's Grand Prix

== Formerly used circuits ==
The old Kyalami track, used from 1983 to 1985.

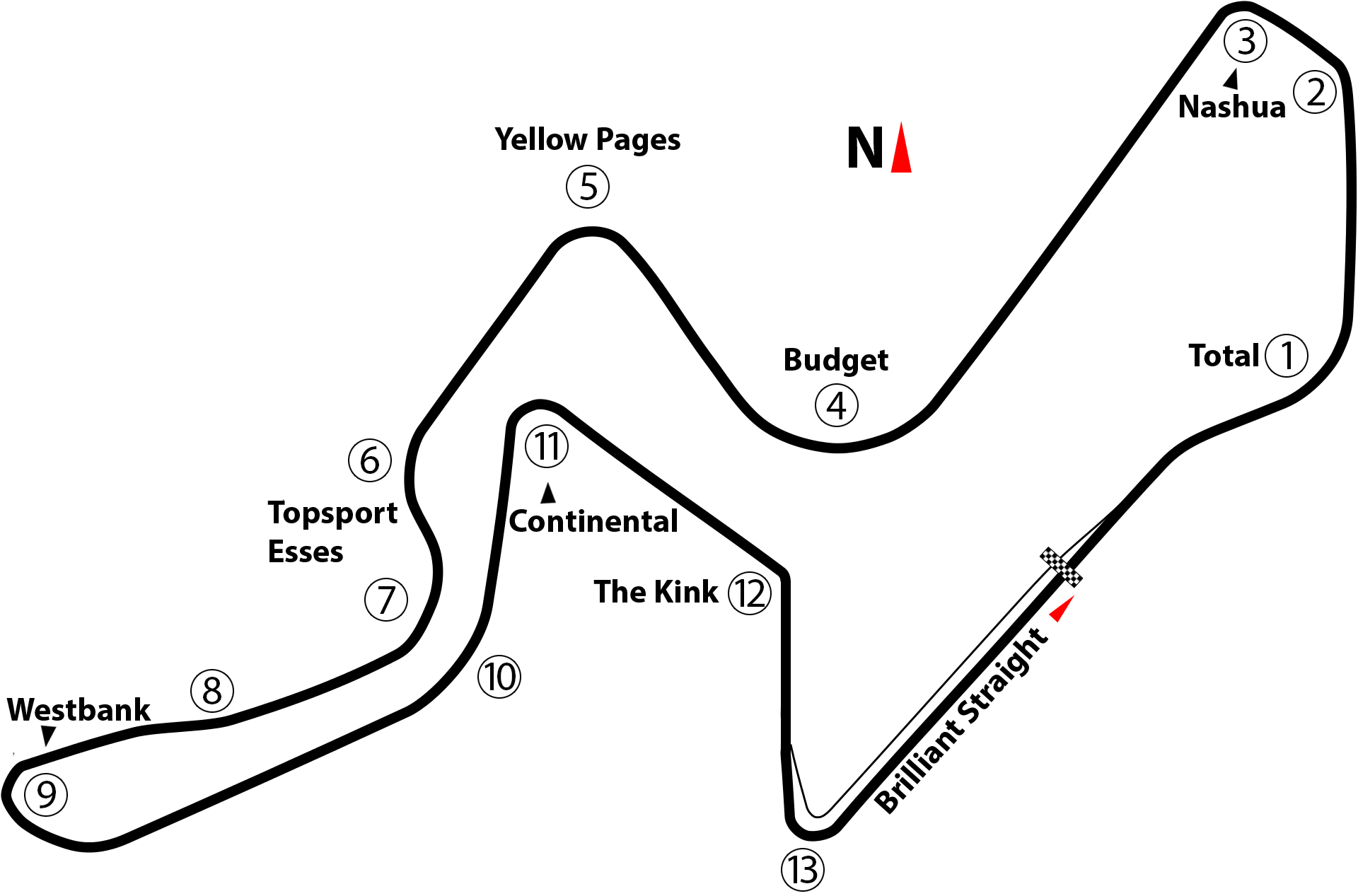
The new, shortened Kyalami track, used in 1992.

== Winners ==
=== Multiple winners (riders) ===
# Wins	Rider	Wins	
# Wins	Rider	Category	Years won
3	(Italy) Valentino Rossi	MotoGP	2004
3	(Italy) Valentino Rossi	500cc	2001
3	(Italy) Valentino Rossi	250cc	1999
2	(United States) Freddie Spencer	500cc	1983
2	(United States) Freddie Spencer	250cc	1985
2	(United States) Eddie Lawson	500cc	1984, 1985
2	(Italy) Max Biaggi	500cc	1999
2	(Italy) Max Biaggi	250cc	1992
2	(San Marino) Manuel Poggiali	250cc	2003
2	(San Marino) Manuel Poggiali	125cc	2002
2	(Spain) Daniel Pedrosa	250cc	2004
2	(Spain) Daniel Pedrosa	125cc	2003

=== Multiple winners (manufacturers) ===
# Wins	Manufacturer	Wins	
# Wins	Manufacturer	Category	Years won
10	(Japan) Honda	MotoGP	2002, 2003
10	(Japan) Honda	500cc	1983, 2001
10	(Japan) Honda	250cc	1985, 2001, 2004
10	(Japan) Honda	125cc	1992, 2003, 2004
8	(Japan) Yamaha	MotoGP	2004
8	(Japan) Yamaha	500cc	1984, 1985, 1992, 1999, 2000
8	(Japan) Yamaha	250cc	1984, 2000
6	(Italy) Aprilia	250cc	1992, 1999, 2002, 2003
6	(Italy) Aprilia	125cc	1999, 2000

=== By year ===
Year	Track	125cc		250cc		MotoGP		Report
Year	Track	Rider	Manufacturer	Rider	Manufacturer	Rider	Manufacturer	Report
2004	Welkom	(Italy) Andrea Dovizioso	Honda	(Spain) Daniel Pedrosa	Honda	(Italy) Valentino Rossi	Yamaha	Report
2003	Welkom	(Spain) Daniel Pedrosa	Honda	(San Marino) Manuel Poggiali	Aprilia	(Spain) Sete Gibernau	Honda	Report
2002	Welkom	(San Marino) Manuel Poggiali	Gilera	(Italy) Marco Melandri	Aprilia	(Japan) Tohru Ukawa	Honda	Report
Year	Track	125cc		250cc		500cc		Report
Year	Track	Rider	Manufacturer	Rider	Manufacturer	Rider	Manufacturer	Report
2001	Welkom	(Japan) Youichi Ui	Derbi	(Japan) Daijiro Kato	Honda	(Italy) Valentino Rossi	Honda	Report
2000	Welkom	(France) Arnaud Vincent	Aprilia	(Japan) Shinya Nakano	Yamaha	(Australia) Garry McCoy	Yamaha	Report
1999	Welkom	(Italy) Gianluigi Scalvini	Aprilia	(Italy) Valentino Rossi	Aprilia	(Italy) Max Biaggi	Yamaha	Report
1992	Kyalami	(Spain) Jorge Martínez	Honda	(Italy) Max Biaggi	Aprilia	(United States) John Kocinski	Yamaha	Report

Year	Track	80cc		125cc		250cc		500cc		Report
Year	Track	Rider	Manufacturer	Rider	Manufacturer	Rider	Manufacturer	Rider	Manufacturer	Report
1985	Kyalami					(United States) Freddie Spencer	Honda	(United States) Eddie Lawson	Yamaha	Report
1984	Kyalami					(France) Patrick Fernandez	Yamaha	(United States) Eddie Lawson	Yamaha	Report
1983	Kyalami					(France) Jean-François Baldé	Chevallier	(United States) Freddie Spencer	Honda	Report
