= Alain Chevallier =

French Grand Prix motorcycle designer and builder

Alain Chevallier (6 November 1947 – 1 November 2018) was a French Grand Prix motorcycle designer and builder.

During the 1970s and 1980s, Chevallier designed and built road racing motorcycles using Yamaha engines and campaigned them in the Grand Prix world championships. His brother Olivier rode the bikes until he was killed while competing at the Grand Prix of Le Castellet in 1980.

Despite his brother's death, Chevallier continued to build and race motorcycles. In 1982, Didier de Radiguès rode a Chevallier-designed bike to victory in the 350cc Yugoslavian Grand Prix and finished the season in second place in the F.I.M. 350cc world championship. His Chevallier teammate Eric Saul won the Austrian Grand Prix and finished the championship in fourth place. In 1983, three of Chevallier's motorcycles ridden by de Radiguès, Thierry Espié, and Jean-François Baldé, finished in the top ten of the F.I.M. 250cc world championship. Baldé would also win the 250cc South African Grand Prix.

Chevallier would move up to the premier 500cc class in 1984, building a race bike using Honda's NS500 engine. De Radiguès rode the bike to a ninth place in the world championship.

In 2000, Chevallier helped design motorcycles for a new French company named Voxan, with his modular composite frame design based on shaped steel tubes inserted into alloy castings doubling as fuel and oil containers respectively.

Chevallier died of cancer on 3 October 2016, aged 68.
