= Jacques Bolle =

French motorcycle racer (born 1959)

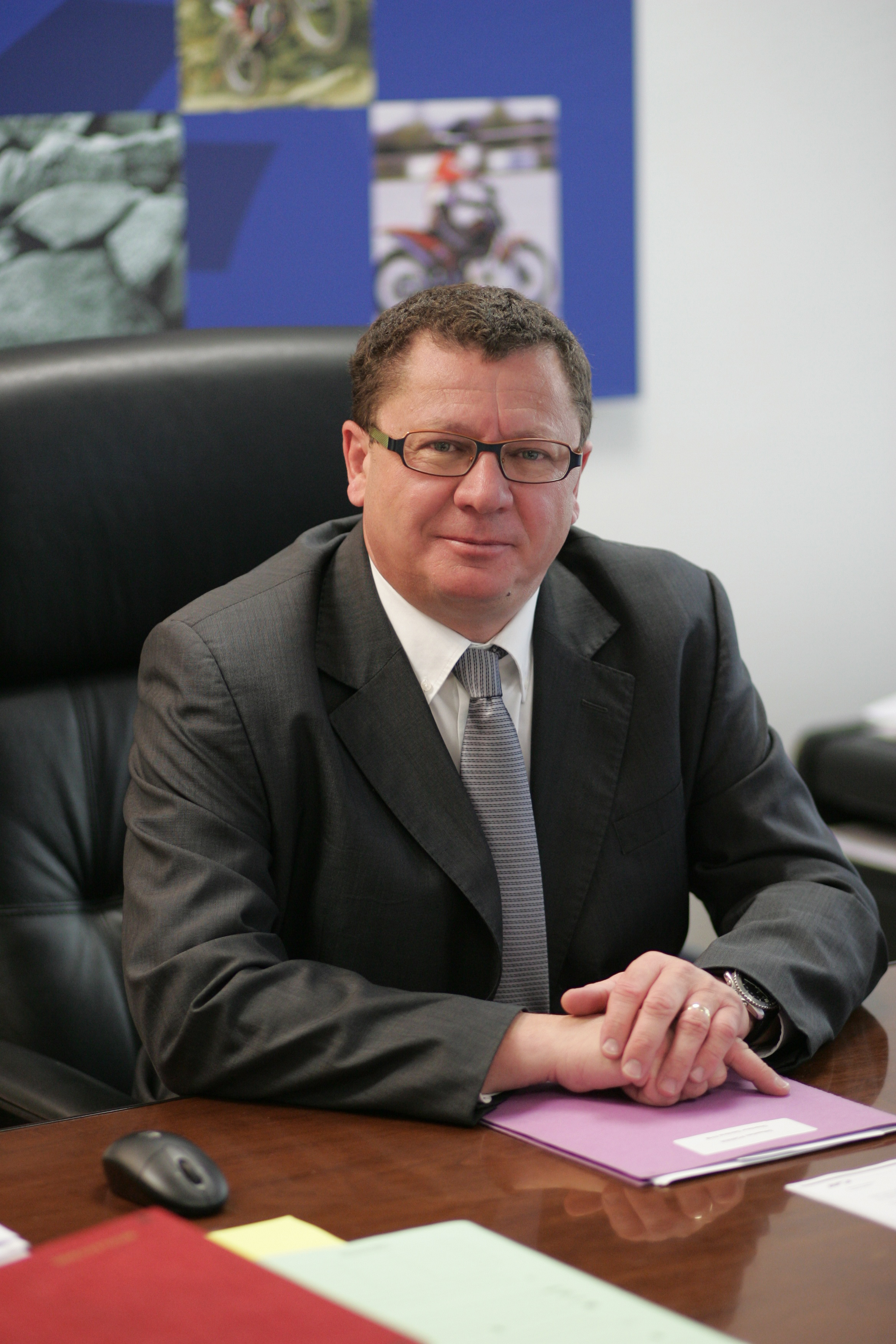
- Nationality: French
Motorcycle racing career statistics
Grand Prix motorcycle racing
Active years	1980 - 1984
First race	1980 250cc Finnish Grand Prix
Last race	1984 250cc San Marino Grand Prix
First win	1983 250cc British Grand Prix
Last win	1983 250cc British Grand Prix
Team	Motobécane - Pernod
Starts / Wins / Podiums / Poles / F. laps / Points; 30 / 1 / 5 / 1 / 1 / 116

Jacques Bolle (born 1 February 1959 in Grenoble) is a French former Grand Prix motorcycle road racer. His best year was in 1981, where he finished in fifth place in the 125cc world championship riding for the Motobécane factory. His only Grand Prix victory was at the 1983 250cc British Grand Prix. Bolle has held the position of president of the French Motorcycle Federation since 2008.
