= Heron International =

Property development company

- Type: Private
- Industry: Property Development
- Founded: 1957; 69 years ago
- Founder: Henry Ronson
- Successor: Home Video Assets: Anchor Bay Entertainment; DreamWorks Classics; PolyGram Video; Lionsgate Home Entertainment
- Headquarters: London, W1; United Kingdom,
- Area served: UK, Europe
- Key people: Gerald Ronson (C.E.O.)
- Subsidiaries: Heron Communications
- Website: http://www.heroninternational.co.uk

Heron International is a British property development company. Founded in 1957 by the Ronson family, it came to prominence in the 1980s as the UK's second largest private company. After over extending itself in the 1990s, it was revived by Gerald Ronson, and has developed a building now known as 110 Bishopsgate, which was initially known as Heron Tower.

== Foundations ==
Named after current Chief Executive Gerald Ronson's father Henry Ronson, Heron was a furniture manufacture and sales business. In 1954, aged 15, Henry's son Gerald joined the family firm, and at the age of 17 was put in charge of developing a new factory. When a mail-order firm put in an offer for the factory as it was approaching completion, Heron entered the property market. Heron Homes became one of the biggest house builders in the South of England. Developing into commercial property and office development, since the 1960s, Heron has developed 160 buildings in nine countries. During the 1970s and 1980s, Heron International sponsored the Suzuki factory racing team in Grand Prix motorcycle racing, with riders including Barry Sheene, Randy Mamola, Mick Grant and Rob McElnea.

By the early 1980s Heron was one of the largest private companies in the United Kingdom, with assets of over £1.5 billion, including a significant stake in the American home video industry by way of Media Home Entertainment and its subsidiary labels, which Heron purchased in 1984. But the company was over-extended, and after Gerald's criminal conviction in the Guinness share-trading fraud during which time he spent six months in Ford Open Prison, by the mid-1990s the company almost collapsed with debts of over £1 billion owed to 11,000 bondholders. The company survived with help from Bill Gates, Rupert Murdoch, Craig McCaw, Oracle Corporation’s founder, Larry Ellison, and others who gave loans to Heron.

== Today ==
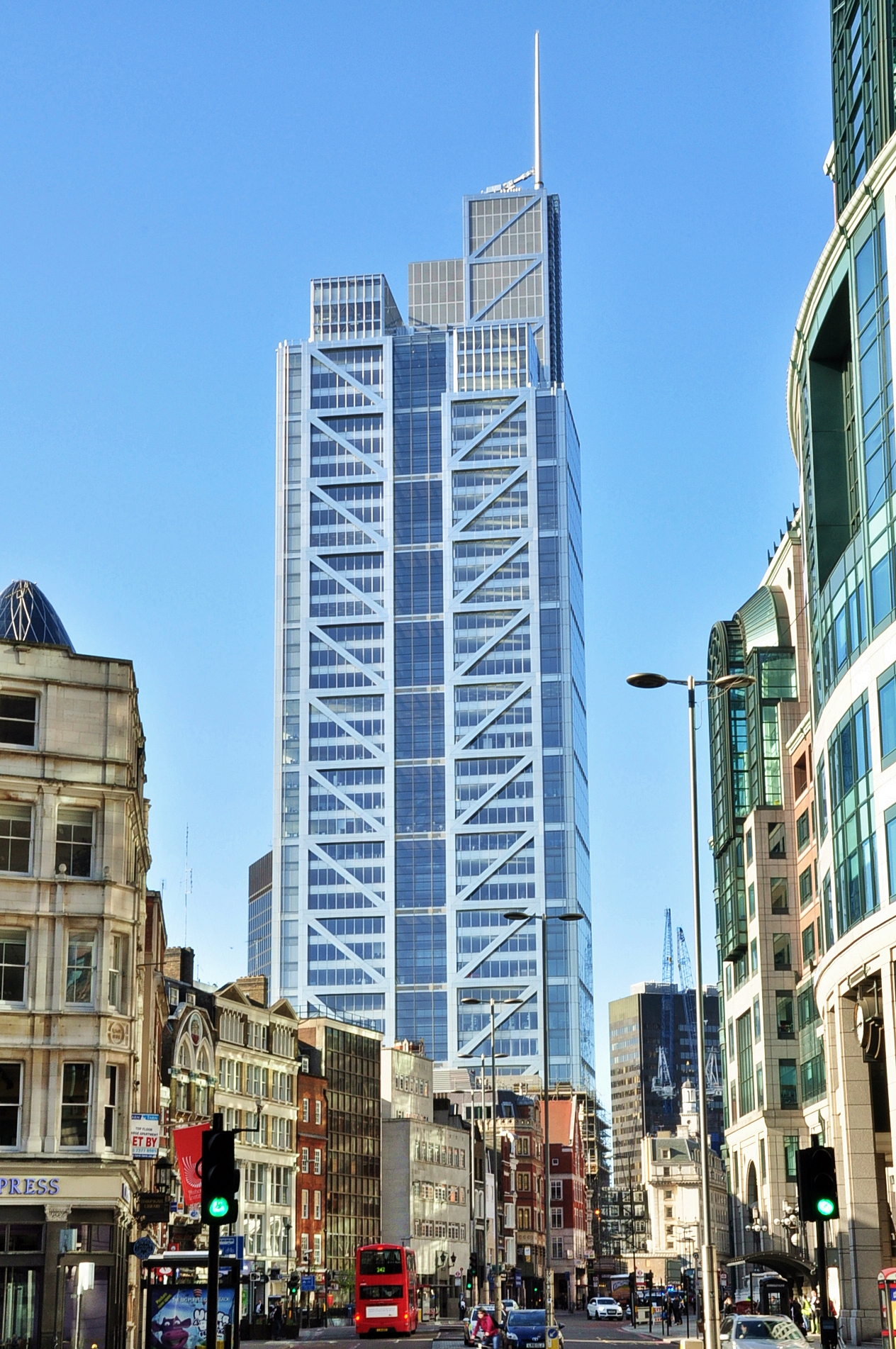
Heron Tower, London

Now supported by a series of investors, Heron International is a property development company, having developed more than 10,000,000 square metres (110,000,000 sq ft) of commercial and retail property, and around 15,000 residential units in the UK, Continental Europe and the US, with an investment portfolio worth over £500 million.

=== Heron Plaza ===
The Heron Tower, the 46-storey office and restaurant building in the City of London (completed in 2011), forms the centrepiece of the Heron Plaza development at 110 Bishopsgate, incorporating new public spaces and a network of squares and gardens. In July 2009, Heron International confirmed that it had signed heads of terms with Four Seasons Hotels and Resorts to develop a mixed-use project as a component of Heron Plaza.

=== The Heron ===
The company also developed The Heron in London's Square Mile on the site of Milton Court. Rather than offices, the slender 36-storey tower includes 285 luxury apartments. The lower floors of the development incorporate new facilities for the Guildhall School of Music and Drama.
