= Suzuki RG 500 gamma =

Racing motorcycle

Suzuki RG500 gamma
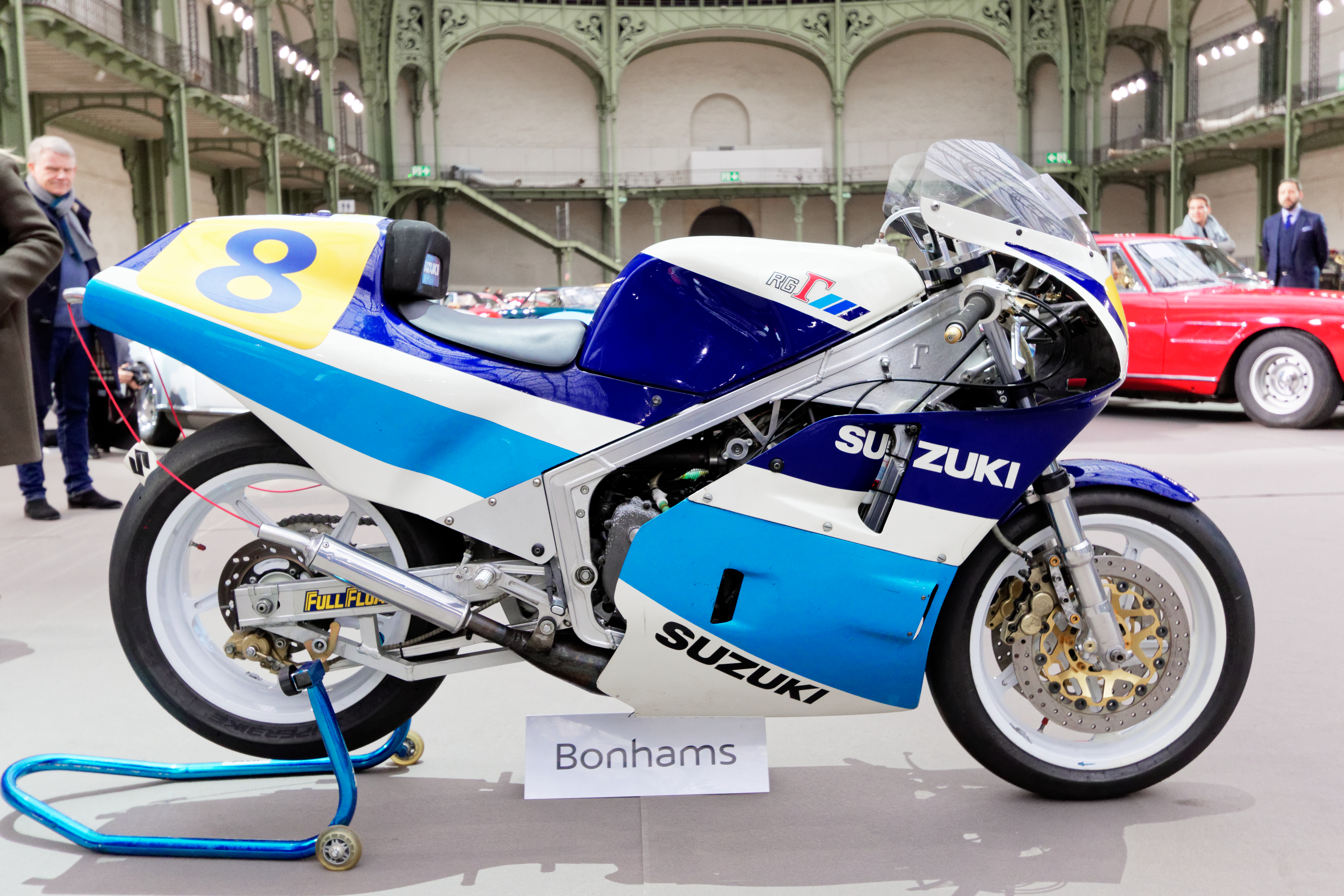
- Manufacturer: Suzuki
- Production: 1981–1984
- Predecessor: Suzuki RG 500
- Successor: Suzuki RGV500
- Engine: 498.5 cc (30.42 cu in) two-stroke 4 cylinders U engine
- Bore / stroke: 56 mm × 50.6 mm (2.20 in × 1.99 in)
- Power: 95 hp (71 kW; 96 PS) @ 9,500 rpm
- Related: Suzuki RG500

Suzuki RG 500 gamma racing motorcycle was manufactured by Suzuki from 1981 to 1984 for competition in the Grand Prix motorcycle racing series. The motorcycle was powered by a 500 cc two stroke engine.

The bike debuted in 1981 replacing the Suzuki RG 500. The Roberto Gallina-Suzuki team won two consecutive riders world championships in the 500cc class with Marco Lucchinelli in 1981 and Franco Uncini in 1982.
