= Randy Mamola =

American motorcycle racer

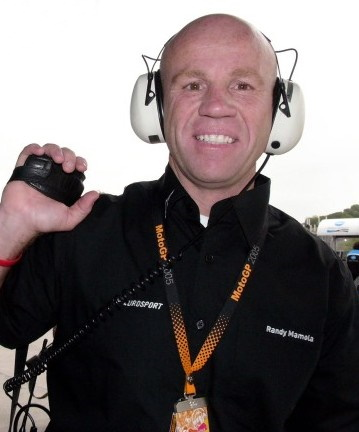
- Mamola in 2005
- Nationality: American
- Born: November 10, 1959 (age 67); San Jose, California, U.S.
Motorcycle racing career statistics
Grand Prix motorcycle racing
| Active years | 1979 - 1990, 1992 |
| First race | 1979 250cc Venezuelan Grand Prix |
| Last race | 1992 500cc South African Grand Prix |
| First win | 1980 500cc Belgian Grand Prix |
| Last win | 1987 500cc San Marino Grand Prix |
| Team(s) | Suzuki, Yamaha, Honda, Cagiva |
| Championships | 0 |
Starts / Wins / Podiums / Poles / F. laps / Points; 151 / 13 / 57 / 5 / 12 / 1050

Randy Edward Mamola (born November 10, 1959) is an American former professional motorcycle racer and television sports presenter. He competed in Grand Prix motorcycle racing between 1979 and 1992. A 13-time Premier Class race winner, Mamola was one of the most charismatic Grand Prix road racers of his generation, becoming a favourite because of his interaction with race fans both on and off the track as well as his aggressive and spirited riding style.

Over the span of his thirteen-year 500cc world championship road racing career, Mamola finished runner-up in the championship four times in 1980, 1981, 1984 and 1987. Mamola's 13 wins and 54 podiums in the Premier Class makes him one of the most accomplished riders to not win the 500cc World Championship. He was inducted into the AMA Motorcycle Hall of Fame in 2000. In 2018, Mamola was inducted into the MotoGP Legends Hall of Fame by FIM.

After his racing career, Mamola became involved in philanthropy, helping to found the Riders for Health charity organization and more recently Two Wheels for Life. Mamola currently works as a television sports commentator.

== Motorcycle racing career ==
Born in San Jose, California, Mamola grew up interested in a career as a musician, playing in a band at the age of ten. When he turned 12 his interests turned to motorcycle racing, idolizing fellow Northern Californian motorcycle racer, Kenny Roberts. He began competing in dirt track racing in Northern California and earned sponsorship from Yamaha when he was 14. Mamola then focused on road racing with coaching from former racer, Ron Grant. He gained his first international exposure in 1977 when Grant took him to compete in the New Zealand Marlboro Series where Mamola made a positive impression.

In 1977, Mamola graduated from high school and began competing professionally in the AMA 250cc road racing championship, finishing as runner up to David Emde in the final standings. In his second year, he won the 1978 AMA 250cc road racing title and began drawing similarities to Kenny Roberts, earning the nickname, "Baby Kenny". His performance earned him a place on the American team for the 1979 Transatlantic Trophy match races. The Transatlantic Trophy match races pitted the best British riders against the top American road racers on 750cc motorcycles in a six-race series in England. As a 250cc rider, Mamola wasn't expected to be a challenger on larger 750cc motorcycles. He surprised observers by finishing the series as the second highest points scorer behind fellow American Mike Baldwin and ahead of former world champion and top British scorer, Barry Sheene.

Mamola entered the 1979 250cc Grand Prix road racing world championships competing on a Yamaha powered Bimota race bike but, after having a difference of opinion with his Italian sponsors, he switched to a Yamaha TZ250 sponsored by Serge Zago. When Zago's 500cc rider Mike Baldwin became injured at mid-season, Mamola moved up to the premier class and took over the team's Suzuki RG 500. Despite competing in only half of the 500cc races, he scored a second place at the Finnish Grand Prix, then led the French Grand Prix for five laps before being passed by Barry Sheene and finishing in second place just ahead of his boyhood idol, Kenny Roberts. He ended his rookie season ranked fourth in the 250cc class and eighth in the 500cc class.

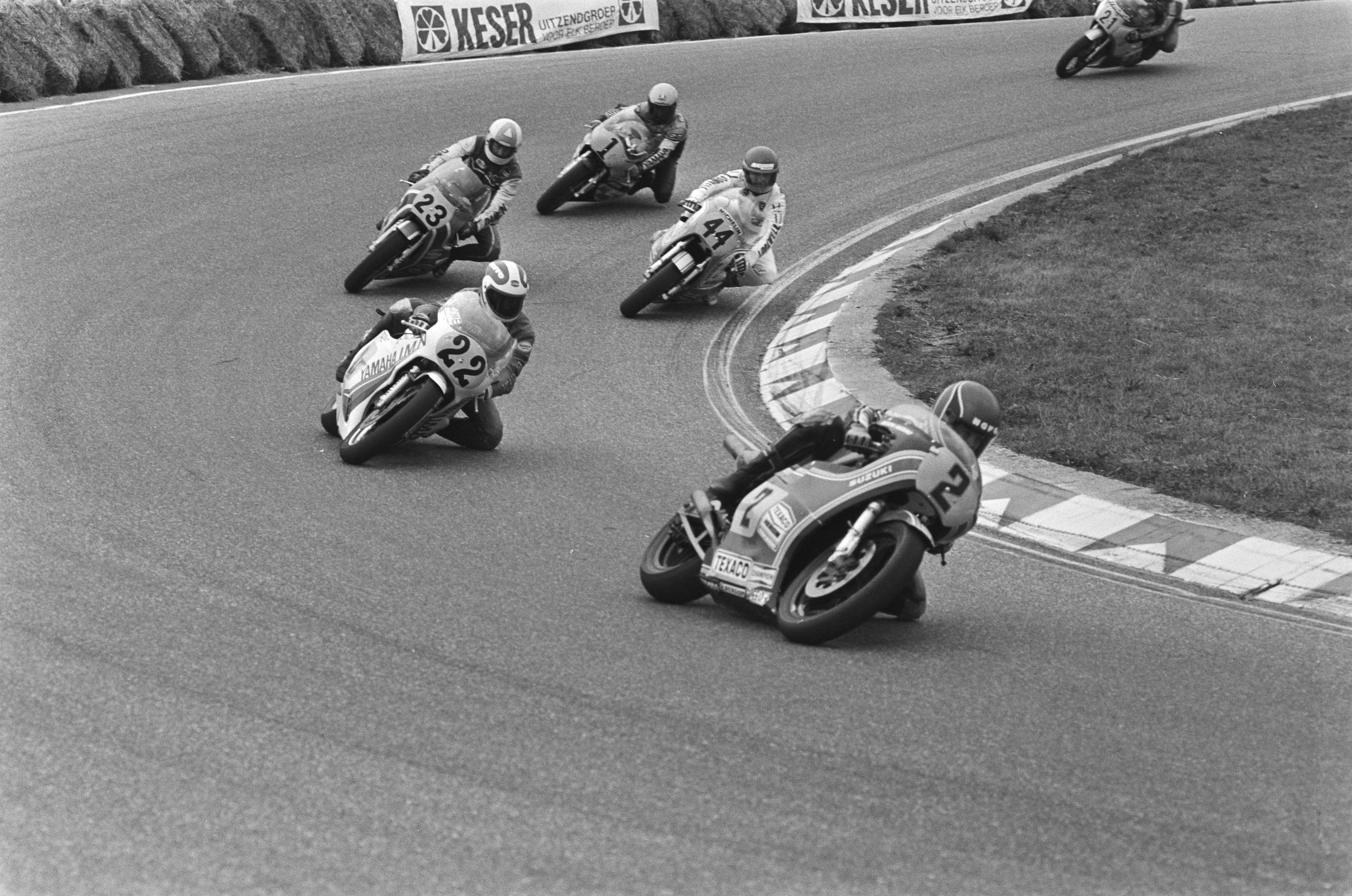
Mamola (2) leads Jack Middelburg (22), Wil Hartog (44) and Kenny Roberts (1) during a 500cc Dutch Invitational race at the Zandvoort Circuit in 1980.

Mamola's exceptional rookie season earned him a full sponsorship from the Suzuki factory racing team for the 1980 season, filling the position vacated by Barry Sheene who departed to race a privateer Yamaha. Mamola and the Suzuki team struggled early in the season as defending champion Kenny Roberts won the first three races of the year. However, Mamola was able to turn things around and won the first 500cc Grand Prix race of his career at the 1980 Belgian Grand Prix, making him the youngest Grand Prix premier class winner in history at the age of 20 years, 239 days, surpassing the previous record set in 1961 by Mike Hailwood (21 years, 75 days). His record would be broken in 1982 by Freddie Spencer (20 years, 196 days).

Mamola won again at the British Grand Prix to close the gap on Roberts to 13 points as they entered the final race of the season held at the daunting, 14.2 miles (22.9 km) long Nürburgring racetrack, considered too dangerous for the Formula One championship. Mamola won the pole position, but his motorcycle experienced fouled spark plugs during the race, relegating him to fifth place. He completed his first full season in the premier class with an impressive second place in the final standings behind Roberts. Mamola ended the 1980 season with a victory at the prestigious Mallory Park Race of the Year.

In 1981, Mamola started the season strongly with two victories and two second-place finishes to take the lead in the championship, but then Gallina-Suzuki rider, Marco Lucchinelli took command with four victories in the next five races to claim the 1981 500cc world championship. Mamola's crew chief, Jeremy Burgess, who later became crew chief for seven-time World Champion, Valentino Rossi, expressed his belief that Mamola would have won the championship if he had been able to use the Michelin tires employed by Lucchinelli rather than the Dunlop tires used by his British based team. His performance was also negatively affected by a helmet visor that misted in cool or damp weather forcing him to slow his pace. For the second time in two years, Mamola had finished in second place; he was only 21 years old, and many observers felt that it was only a matter of time before he would win a World Championship.

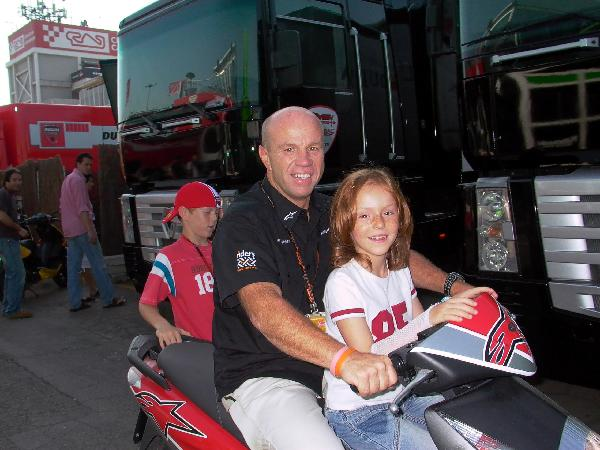
Mamola in Barcelona (2006)

At the beginning of the 1982 season, Mamola struggled to score points; however, he recovered to score two second places and a victory in the last three races to finish sixth in the final championship standings. The 1983 season was dominated by Honda's Freddie Spencer and Yamaha's Kenny Roberts. While Spencer had the new Honda NS500 and Roberts had a new YZR500 with a V4 engine, Mamola soldiered on with the once dominant Suzuki RG 500. The RG 500 had begun to show its age as Suzuki's pursuit of a lightweight and compact machine had led to a myriad of handling problems associated with the flexing of the thin aluminum frame tubing. Spencer and Roberts each won 6 of the season's 12 races as Mamola rode to a respectable third place in the championship standings.

Mamola lost his job when Suzuki withdrew from Grand Prix racing after the 1983 season, when Spencer suffered an injury during the pre-season 1984 Trans-Atlantic Match Races, Honda contracted him to join their racing team.

Mamola rode the Honda NS 500 to a second-place finish behind Eddie Lawson at the 1984 Spanish Grand Prix in his Honda debut. Mamola went on to win three of the last five races of the season, including a win at the British Grand Prix at Silverstone aboard the new, V4 Honda NSR500 which featured an upside down chassis with its fuel tank beneath the engine and its exhaust pipes routed over the top of the engine. The first-year NSR500 was maligned for its poor handling characteristics, which became apparent only after the fuel load decreased during races, upsetting the chassis weight distribution. Despite the late season surge, Mamola finished second in the championship behind Lawson. It marked the third time in his career that he was runner up in the 500cc world championship.

Mamola had a disappointing season in 1985 when Spencer and Lawson dominated, managing to win one race at the Dutch TT. 1985 was also the year in which Mamola performed one of the most miraculous saves in motorcycle Grand Prix history at the San Marino Grand Prix. After his rear tire lost and then suddenly regained traction, Mamola was thrown forward over the handlebars. In an impressive display of strength and perseverance, Mamola firmly gripped the handlebars while both legs hung off the right side of the motorcycle. He held the motorcycle upright while it careened off the track before he was able to swing his left leg back onto the machine and regained control.

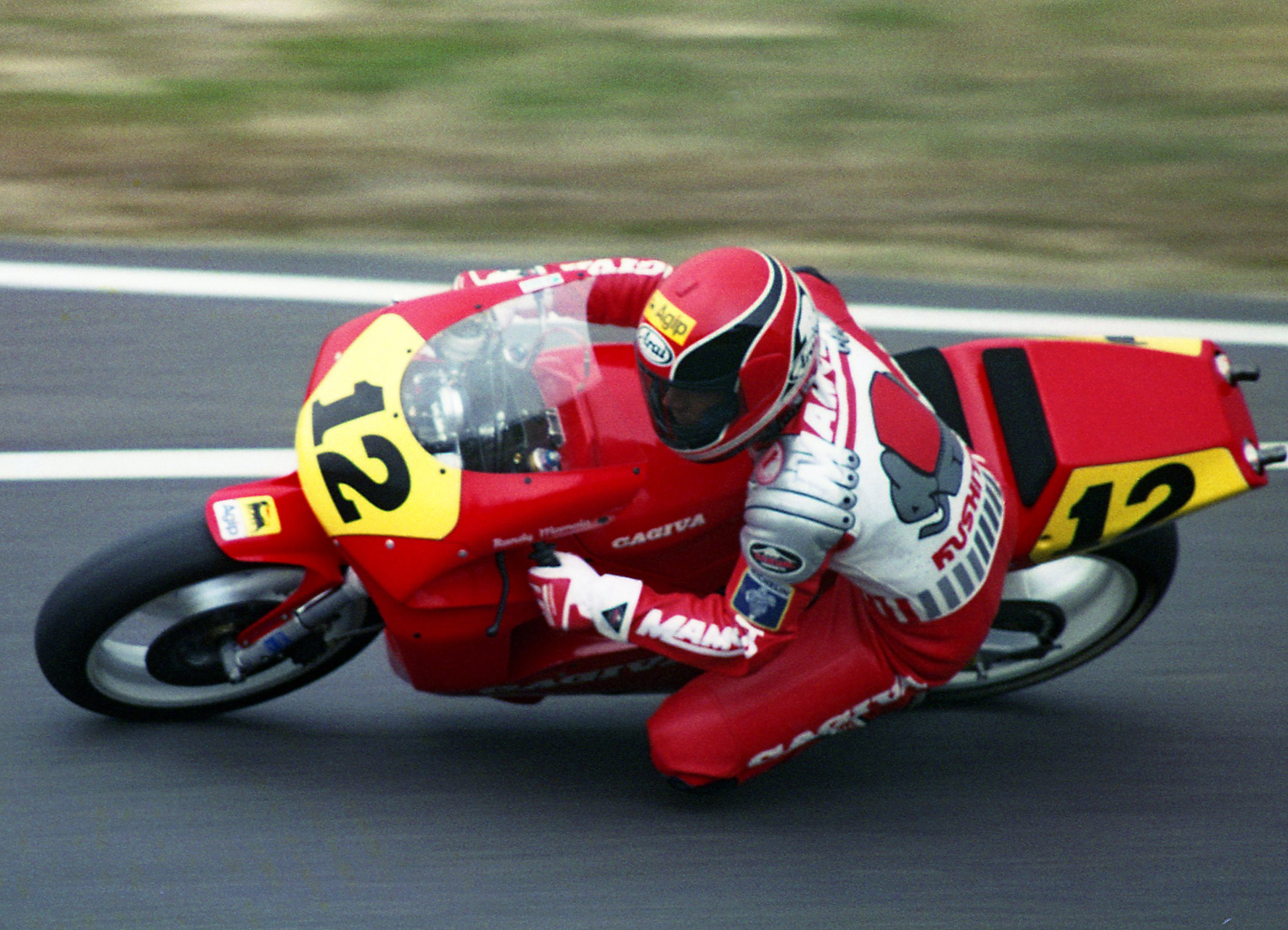
Mamola aboard the Cagiva C589 in 1989

Mamola joined the newly formed Kenny Roberts-Yamaha team in 1986. Riding a YZR-500, he won the Belgian Grand Prix and scored six podium results to finish the season in third place behind Eddie Lawson and Wayne Gardner. At the French Grand Prix, Mamola was lying in second place on the final lap when he performed a stoppie just prior to crossing the finish line. Despite not losing a position, Mamola's act incensed Roberts, who viewed it as irresponsible at a time when motorcycle racing was entering an era of increased professionalism with high dollar sponsorship. Mamola began the 1987 season with a victory at the Japanese Grand Prix but then Gardner went on a streak, winning four of the next five races to take command of the championship. Despite scoring two more victories at the French and San Marino Grands Prix, as well as nine podium results, he ended the season in second place behind Gardner. Roberts decided to shake up his team for the 1988 season by replacing Mamola and Baldwin with younger riders, Wayne Rainey and Kevin Magee.

Mamola then joined Cagiva to help them develop their Cagiva C589 race bike. He stayed with the Italian team for three years, but lack of funds hampered the team's success. After sitting out the 1991 season, he returned in 1992 for one last year on a privately supported Yamaha. He scored his final podium finish with a third place at the 1992 500cc Hungarian Grand Prix and finished the season ranked tenth in the world championship.

Mamola won a total of 13 Grands Prix and finished second in the championship four times: in 1980, 1981, 1984 and 1987. During his Grand Prix career he rode for Yamaha, Suzuki, Honda and Cagiva.

== Life after racing and charity work ==
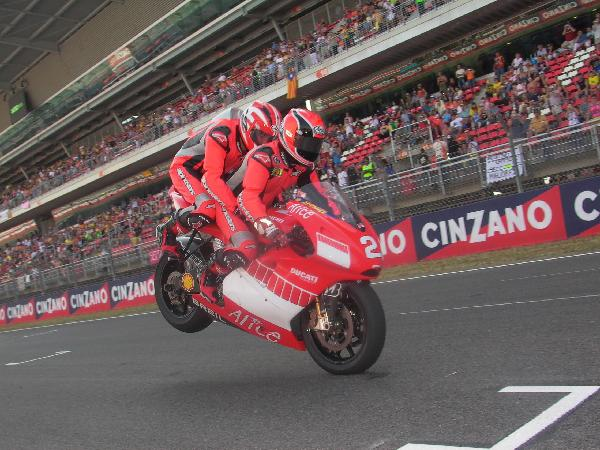
Mamola demonstrating a dual-seater Ducati at Barcelona

After retiring from competition, Mamola remained involved in motorcycle racing by helping Yamaha develop their race bikes by working as a test rider. He later became a television commentator for motorcycle Grand Prix races as well as working as a columnist for several motorcycle magazines.

Mamola began his charity work while he was still racing in 1986 when, he became involved with the global charity program Save the Children. This experience led him to become a co-founder of Riders for Health, an organization that provides motorcycles, ambulances and other four-wheel vehicles used to deliver health care to remote locations in seven countries across Africa. The organization also provides training in vehicle maintenance to help insure the delivery of medical assistance. Mamola is the figurehead for the charity at motorsports events across the globe, helping raise money by soliciting donations from MotoGP racers of items such as helmets, gloves and other items to be auctioned off. His fund-raising activities also include providing passengers an opportunity to experience a fast lap of a race track aboard a special two-seater Ducati MotoGP bike.

== Grand Prix career statistics ==
Points system from 1969 to 1987:

| **Position** | 1 | 2 | 3 | 4 | 5 | 6 | 7 | 8 | 9 | 10 |
| **Points** | 15 | 12 | 10 | 8 | 6 | 5 | 4 | 3 | 2 | 1 |

Points system from 1988 to 1992:

| **Position** | 1 | 2 | 3 | 4 | 5 | 6 | 7 | 8 | 9 | 10 | 11 | 12 | 13 | 14 | 15 |
| **Points** | 20 | 17 | 15 | 13 | 11 | 10 | 9 | 8 | 7 | 6 | 5 | 4 | 3 | 2 | 1 |

(key) (Races in bold indicate pole position; races in italics indicate fastest lap)

| Year | Class | Team | Machine | 1 | 2 | 3 | 4 | 5 | 6 | 7 | 8 | 9 | 10 | 11 | 12 | 13 | 14 | 15 | Points | Rank | Wins |
|---|---|---|---|---|---|---|---|---|---|---|---|---|---|---|---|---|---|---|---|---|---|
| 1979 | 250cc | Bimota-Adriatica | Bimota | VEN; 5 | | GER; 2 | NAT; 2 | | | | | | | | | | | | 64 | 4th | 0 |
| 1979 | 250cc | Zago-Yamaha | TZ250 | | | | | ESP; 8 | YUG; 10 | NED; 7 | BEL - | SWE - | FIN - | GBR; 2 | CZE; 5 | FRA; 4 | | | 64 | 4th | 0 |
| 1979 | 500cc | Zago-Suzuki | RG500 | VEN - | AUT - | GER - | NAT - | ESP - | YUG - | NED; 13 | BEL; DNS | SWE; 6 | FIN; 2 | GBR - | | FRA; 2 | | | 29 | 8th | 0 |
| 1980 | 500cc | Heron-Suzuki | RG500 | NAT; NC | ESP; 3 | FRA; 2 | NED; 5 | **BEL**; 1 | FIN; 4 | GBR; 1 | **GER**; 5 | | | | | | | | 72 | **2nd** | 2 |
| 1981 | 500cc | Heron-Suzuki | RG500 | AUT; 1 | GER; 2 | NAT; NC | FRA; 2 | YUG; 1 | NED; NC | BEL; 3 | RSM; 4 | GBR; 3 | FIN; 2 | SWE; 13 | | | | | 94 | **2nd** | 2 |
| 1982 | 500cc | HB-Suzuki | RG500 | ARG; NC | AUT; 7 | FRA - | ESP - | NAT - | NED; 5 | BEL; 5 | YUG; 7 | GBR; 5 | SWE; 2 | RSM; 2 | GER; 1 | | | | 65 | 6th | 1 |
| 1983 | 500cc | HB-Suzuki | RG500 | RSA; 5 | FRA; NC | NAT; 2 | GER; 8 | ESP; 4 | AUT; 3 | YUG; 2 | NED; 4 | BEL; 3 | GBR; 3 | SWE; 7 | RSM; 5 | | | | 89 | **3rd** | 0 |
| 1984 | 500cc | HRC-Honda | NS500 | RSA - | NAT - | ESP; 2 | **AUT**; 3 | GER; 3 | FRA; 3 | YUG; 2 | NED; 1 | BEL; 2 | | SWE; NC | RSM; 1 | | | | 111 | **2nd** | 3 |
| 1984 | 500cc | HRC-Honda | NSR500 | | | | | | | | | | GBR; 1 | | | | | | 111 | **2nd** | 3 |
| 1985 | 500cc | Rothmans-Honda | NS500 | RSA; 5 | ESP; NC | GER; 8 | NAT; 4 | AUT; 4 | YUG; NC | NED; 1 | BEL; NC | FRA; 3 | GBR; 5 | SWE; 5 | RSM; 3 | | | | 72 | 6th | 1 |
| 1986 | 500cc | Lucky Strike-Yamaha | YZR500 | ESP; 4 | NAT; 2 | GER; 6 | AUT; 3 | **YUG**; 2 | NED; 2 | BEL; 1 | FRA; 2 | GBR; 5 | SWE; 8 | RSM; 3 | | | | | 105 | **3rd** | 1 |
| 1987 | 500cc | Lucky Strike-Yamaha | YZR500 | JPN; 1 | ESP; 6 | GER; 2 | NAT; NC | AUT; 2 | YUG; 2 | NED; 3 | FRA; 1 | GBR; 3 | SWE; 3 | CZE; 4 | RSM; 1 | **POR**; 2 | BRA; 3 | ARG; 2 | 158 | **2nd** | 3 |
| 1988 | 500cc | Cagiva | C588 | JPN; NC | USA - | ESP - | EXP - | NAT; 7 | GER; NC | AUT; NC | NED; NC | BEL; 3 | YUG; 4 | FRA; 6 | GBR; 11 | SWE; 10 | CZE; NC | BRA; NC | 58 | 12th | 0 |
| 1989 | 500cc | Cagiva | C589 | JPN; 16 | AUS; NC | USA; NC | ESP; NC | NAT; DNS | GER; 12 | AUT; NC | YUG; 7 | NED; 11 | BEL; 23 | FRA; 11 | GBR - | SWE - | CZE; 11 | BRA; 11 | 33 | 18th | 0 |
| 1990 | 500cc | Cagiva | C590 | JPN; NC | USA; 7 | ESP - | NAT; 7 | GER; 9 | AUT; 10 | YUG; NC | NED; 18 | BEL; NC | FRA; 7 | GBR; 6 | SWE; NC | CZE; 11 | HUN; NC | AUS - | 55 | 14th | 0 |
| 1992 | 500cc | Budweiser-Yamaha | YZR500 | JPN; 5 | AUS; 8 | MAL; 7 | ESP; 8 | ITA; 10 | EUR; 9 | GER; NC | NED; 5 | HUN; 3 | FRA; 8 | GBR; NC | BRA; 10 | RSA; NC | | | 45 | 10th | 0 |

== Bibliography ==
- Oxley, Mat (1 October 1999). Randy Mamola: Master of Mayhem. Haynes Publishing. ISBN 978-1859606131.
