= Jeremy Burgess =

Australian motorcycle racing engineer

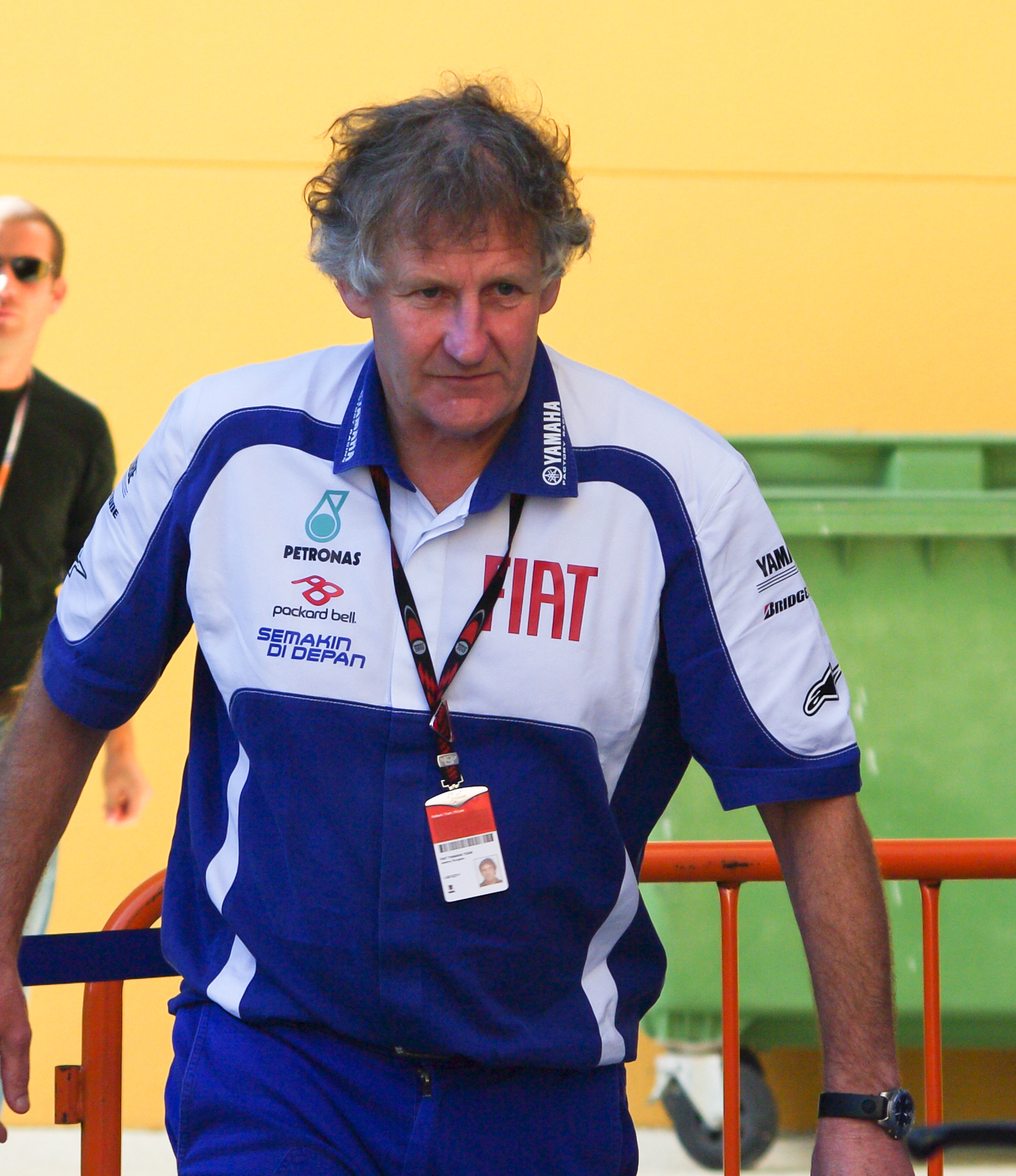
- Jeremy Burgess at the Circuit Ricardo Tormo, Valencia, 2010
- Born: Jeremy Donaldson Burgess; 16 April 1953 (age 73); Adelaide Hills, South Australia
- Occupations: Chief Mechanic, three world champions
- Known for: MotoGP

Jeremy Donaldson Burgess (16 April 1953 in Adelaide Hills, South Australia), is an Australian motorcycle racing chief mechanic, having worked with three world champions: Wayne Gardner, Mick Doohan and Valentino Rossi. He was also a mechanic on Freddie Spencer's team when Spencer won the 500cc World title in 1985.

Winning machines prepared by Burgess range from the Suzukis of Randy Mamola to the Hondas of Ron Haslam, Freddie Spencer, Wayne Gardner, Mick Doohan and Valentino Rossi to the Yamaha of Valentino Rossi. Since July 1980, these riders have won 157 GP/MotoGP races (as at 2 November 2009) and a total of fourteen World Championships on motorcycles that "JB" has either prepared himself or whose preparation he has overseen as crew chief. Burgess's machinery have achieved over 280 podium finishes.

== Early life and racing career ==
Born on a farm in the Adelaide Hills in 1953, he grew up around machinery, first driving aged 8 and owning his first car aged 12.

Three days after leaving school, he bought his first race track bike, a 1969 Suzuki T500 Cobra. From 1972 through 1979, he rode on the Australian racing circuit, racing against Gregg Hansford, Warren Willing, Kenny Blake and Harry Hinton. His own racing efforts culminated in his purchase of a Suzuki RG500, with which he had much success due to the reliability of his preparation.

== Heron Suzuki: 1980–1983 ==
Looking to extend his racing career, in February 1980, Burgess decided to visit Europe to observe the Grand Prix racing scene. But he quickly figured out that he wasn't as young or as well financed as he would need to make it.

Staying with a friend in Surbiton, Surrey, who worked for Suzuki GB, at Burgess's request his friend put his name forward for a mechanic's job with Texaco Heron Team Suzuki at Beddington Lane in Croydon, South London. He already knew team racer Graeme Crosby (who he had raced against); mechanics Mick Smith and crew chief George Vukmanovich (who worked as a mechanic on the Australian circuit in 1978); and had met Randy Mamola in New Zealand in 1976.

Employed as a mechanic on Mamola's GP team, in July 1980, Mamola won the Belgian GP. Burgess remained with Mamola and Vukmanovich at Suzuki until 1983, when he moved to Honda with whom he was to stay for the next 21 years.

== Honda: 1983–2003 ==
Moving to Honda, Burgess became chief mechanic to British rider Ron Haslam. In 1985, Burgess was transferred by Honda to Freddie Spencer's support team working for crew chief Erv Kanemoto and preparing Spencer's 500cc machinery. Burgess learned his GP skills from crew chiefs George Vukmanovich and Erv Kanemoto. 1985 was Spencer's remarkable "double" year when he won the 250cc and 500cc World Titles, the first time Burgess had prepared a World Championship-winning motorcycle.

The following year, 1986, Burgess was promoted to crew chief of fellow Australian Wayne Gardner, who won the title the following year (1987). In 1989, Burgess became crew chief to Mick Doohan, who went on to win Premier World Championships in five successive years between 1994 and 1998.

After Doohan retired in 1999 due to injuries, Burgess was thinking about quitting; he had witnessed too many major crashes and allegedly didn't want to be a part of it any more. But when Valentino Rossi was given the opportunity to race with Honda, he said the only way Honda would get him was if Burgess was his engineer. Burgess became crew chief to Rossi in what was Rossi's debut year riding in the premier (500cc) class, and helped mastermind Rossi's seven world titles (five in successive years from 2001 to 2005) in 500cc/MotoGP.

== Yamaha: 2004–2010 ==
In 2004, Rossi moved from Honda to rival manufacturer Yamaha accompanied by Burgess and other crew members. Despite different machinery and only a few weeks Yamaha experience, by April 2004, the Rossi-Burgess partnership had transformed Yamaha's previously mediocre success into a victory at their first title race, the South African GP at Welkom.

== Ducati: 2011–12 ==
In post-season 2010, Rossi signed a two-year contract with Ducati for the 2011 and 2012 seasons and once again convinced Burgess to be part of his team. Burgess also transferred most of his crew, mainly Australians and New Zealanders.

== Personal life ==
Burgess married Claudine who worked for Rothmans during his time with Doohan. The couple have two children, both girls, and live in Australia. Burgess' other passion is Australian rules football team the Adelaide Crows. He is also very fond of fixing up all Jaguar Cars and his Triumph TR4.
