= 1989 Australian motorcycle Grand Prix =

(Australia) 1989 Australian Grand Prix
Race details
- Race 2 of 15 races in the 1989 Grand Prix motorcycle racing season
- Date: 9 April 1989
- Official name: Swan Premium Australian Motorcycle Grand Prix
- Location: Phillip Island Grand Prix Circuit
- Course: Permanent racing facility; 4.445 km (2.762 mi)

500cc
Pole position
- Rider: (United States) Kevin Schwantz
- Time: 1:34.990
Fastest lap
- Rider: (Italy) Pierfrancesco Chili
- Time: 1:35.280
Podium
- First: (Australia) Wayne Gardner
- Second: (United States) Wayne Rainey
- Third: (France) Christian Sarron

250cc
Pole position
- Rider: (France) Jean-Philippe Ruggia
- Time: 1:38.830
Fastest lap
- Rider: (Italy) Luca Cadalora
- Time: 1:38.490
Podium
- First: (Spain) Sito Pons
- Second: (France) Jean-Philippe Ruggia
- Third: (Italy) Luca Cadalora

125cc
Pole position
- Rider: (Spain) Jorge Martínez
- Time: 1:45.530
Fastest lap
- Rider: (Spain) Jorge Martínez
- Time: 1:46.530
Podium
- First: (Spain) Àlex Crivillé
- Second: (United Kingdom) Robin Milton
- Third: (United States) Alan Scott

The 1989 Australian motorcycle Grand Prix was the second of 15 races in the 1989 Grand Prix motorcycle racing season. It took place on the weekend of April 7–9, 1989, at Phillip Island, and was the first-ever World Championship Motorcycle Grand Prix to be held in Australia.

== 500 cc race report ==
Into the first corner of the race, Wayne Rainey, Tadahiko Taira, and Kevin Schwantz were at the front of the field, with Wayne Gardner in 4th. On the second lap whilst running in second place, Schwantz crashed out at Turn Ten; as he walked away from his Suzuki, he appeared visibly annoyed.

Rainey pulled out a lead of more than a second, followed by Kevin Magee, Taira, Gardner, Mick Doohan, and Eddie Lawson. Gardner eventually overtook Magee at Turn Four, and Pierfrancesco Chili crashed out for the second successive race. Gardner caught Rainey and began to swap the lead, while Magee, Christian Sarron, Freddie Spencer, and Lawson closed in on the leaders. Sarron caught up and went to the front with the leaders, while Magee held 4th spot. Spencer fell off and did not finish the race.

On the last lap, Gardner led, with Rainey and Sarron behind, and a further small gap to Magee. Rainey's depleted tyres meant he was unable to pass Gardner, and Gardner won the race, followed by Rainey and Sarron.

During the race, Wayne Rainey and Wayne Gardner had some close encounters on the track.

== 500 cc classification ==
Pos.	Rider	Team	Manufacturer	Laps	Time/Retired	Grid	Points
1	(Australia) Wayne Gardner	Rothmans Honda Team	Honda	30	48:15.940	3	20
2	(United States) Wayne Rainey	Team Lucky Strike Roberts	Yamaha	30	+0.350	2	17
3	(France) Christian Sarron	Sonauto Gauloises Blondes Yamaha Mobil 1	Yamaha	30	+0.470	5	15
4	(Australia) Kevin Magee	Team Lucky Strike Roberts	Yamaha	30	+1.510	6	13
5	(United States) Eddie Lawson	Rothmans Kanemoto Honda	Honda	30	+10.970	7	11
6	(Japan) Tadahiko Taira	Yamaha Motor Company	Yamaha	30	+12.570	4	10
7	(United Kingdom) Ron Haslam	Suzuki Pepsi Cola	Suzuki	30	+32.460	11	9
8	(Australia) Mick Doohan	Rothmans Honda Team	Honda	30	+47.660	12	8
9	(Australia) Michael Dowson		Yamaha	30	+1:27.820	16	7
10	(France) Dominique Sarron	Team ROC Elf Honda	Honda	29	+1 Lap	17	6
11	(Italy) Alessandro Valesi	Team Iberia	Yamaha	29	+1 Lap	19	5
12	(United Kingdom) Simon Buckmaster	Racing Team Katayama	Honda	29	+1 Lap	20	4
13	(Switzerland) Marco Gentile	Fior Marlboro	Fior	29	+1 Lap	18	3
14	(Switzerland) Nicholas Schmassman	FMS	Honda	27	+3 Laps	22	2
15	(Germany) Michael Rudroff	HRK Motors	Honda	27	+3 Laps	21	1
Ret	(Australia) Greg Drew		PRP		Retirement	23	
Ret	(United States) Freddie Spencer	Marlboro Yamaha Team Agostini	Yamaha		Retirement	8	
Ret	(United States) Randy Mamola	Cagiva Corse	Cagiva		Retirement	14	
Ret	(Australia) Malcolm Campbell		Honda		Retirement	15	
Ret	(United States) Kevin Schwantz	Suzuki Pepsi Cola	Suzuki		Retirement	1	
Ret	(United States) Bubba Shobert	Cabin Racing Team	Honda		Retirement	13	
Ret	(Spain) Francisco Gonzales	Club Motocross Pozuelo	Honda		Retirement	24	
Ret	(United Kingdom) Niall Mackenzie	Marlboro Yamaha Team Agostini	Yamaha		Retirement	9	
Ret	(Australia) James Judd		Yamaha		Retirement	25	
Ret	(Italy) Pierfrancesco Chili	HB Honda Gallina Team	Honda		Retirement	10	
DNS	(Australia) Craig Harwood		Yamaha		Did not start		

Previous race: 1989 Japanese Grand Prix	FIM Grand Prix World Championship; 1989 season	Next race: 1989 United States Grand Prix
Previous race: None	Australian motorcycle Grand Prix	Next race: 1990 Australian Grand Prix
