= 1984 Dutch TT =

(Netherlands) 1984 Dutch TT
Race details
- Race 8 of 12 races in the 1984 Grand Prix motorcycle racing season
- Date: 30 June 1984
- Official name: Dutch TT Assen
- Location: TT Circuit Assen
- Course: Permanent racing facility; 6.049 km (3.759 mi)

500cc
Pole position
- Rider: (United States) Eddie Lawson
- Time: 2:15.940
Fastest lap
- Rider: (United States) Eddie Lawson
- Time: 2:15.750
Podium
- First: (United States) Randy Mamola
- Second: (France) Raymond Roche
- Third: (United States) Eddie Lawson

250cc
Pole position
- Rider: (Venezuela) Carlos Lavado
- Time: 2:22.320
Fastest lap
- Rider: (Switzerland) Jacques Cornu
- Time: 2:24.390
Podium
- First: (Venezuela) Carlos Lavado
- Second: (Switzerland) Jacques Cornu
- Third: (West Germany) Manfred Herweh

125cc
Pole position
- Rider: (Austria) August Auinger
- Time: 2:29.890
Fastest lap
- Rider: (Spain) Ángel Nieto
- Time: 2:29.630
Podium
- First: (Spain) Ángel Nieto
- Second: (Italy) Eugenio Lazzarini
- Third: (Switzerland) Hans Müller

80cc
Pole position
- Rider: (Switzerland) Stefan Dörflinger
- Time: 2:42.030
Fastest lap
- Rider: (Spain) Jorge Martínez
- Time: 2:39.980
Podium
- First: (Spain) Jorge Martínez
- Second: (Netherlands) Hans Spaan
- Third: (West Germany) Hubert Abold

The 1984 Dutch TT was the eighth round of the 1984 Grand Prix motorcycle racing season. It took place on the weekend of 29–30 June 1984 at the TT Circuit Assen located in Assen, Netherlands.

== Classification ==
=== 500 cc ===
Pos.	Rider	Team	Manufacturer	Time/Retired	Points
1	(United States) Randy Mamola	RM Promotions	Honda	45'48.880	15
2	(France) Raymond Roche	Honda Total	Honda	+0.280	12
3	(United States) Eddie Lawson	Marlboro Team Agostini	Yamaha	+1.980	10
4	(United Kingdom) Ron Haslam	Honda Racing Corporation	Honda	+45.610	8
5	(Australia) Wayne Gardner	Honda Britain	Honda	+1'02.520	6
6	(Japan) Tadahiko Taira		Yamaha	+1'12.560	5
7	(West Germany) Gustav Reiner	Olymp-Hemden Racing	Honda	+1'25.690	4
8	(Japan) Takazumi Katayama	Honda Racing Corporation	Honda	+1'32.570	3
9	(West Germany) Reinhold Roth	Romer Racing Suisse	Honda	+1'38.340	2
10	(Finland) Eero Hyvärinen		Suzuki	+1'45.970	1
11	(United Kingdom) Mark Salle		Suzuki	+1'50.760	
12	(United Kingdom) Steve Parrish		Yamaha	+1'59.910	
13	(United Kingdom) Keith Huewen	David Attwood	Honda	+2'08.020	
14	(Switzerland) Wolfgang von Muralt	Frankonia-Suzuki	Suzuki	+2'13.050	
15	(France) Christian le Liard	Team Elf Chevallier Johnson	Chevallier	+1 lap	
16	(Australia) Paul Lewis		Suzuki	+1 lap	
17	(Netherlands) Henk de Vries		Suzuki	+1 lap	
18	(Italy) Walter Magliorati		Suzuki	+1 lap	
19	(Italy) Lorenzo Ghiselli		Suzuki	+1 lap	
20	(Italy) Leandro Beccheroni		Suzuki	+1 lap	
21	(South Africa) Brett Hudson	Romer Racing Suisse	Honda	+1 lap	
22	(Netherlands) Maarten Duyzers		Suzuki	+1 lap	
23	(United Kingdom) Chris Guy		Suzuki	+2 laps	
Ret	(Netherlands) Henk van der Mark		Honda	Retired	
Ret	(Italy) Fabio Biliotti		Honda	Retired	
Ret	(Switzerland) Sergio Pellandini	HB Suzuki GP Team	Suzuki	Retired	
Ret	(United Kingdom) Barry Sheene	Heron Team Suzuki	Suzuki	Retired	
Ret	(France) Hervé Moineau	Cagiva Motor Italia	Cagiva	Retired	
Ret	(Belgium) Didier de Radiguès	Team Elf Chevallier Johnson	Honda	Retired	
Ret	(Italy) Massimo Broccoli		Honda	Retired	
Ret	(United States) Freddie Spencer	Honda Racing Corporation	Honda	Retired	
Ret	(Italy) Virginio Ferrari	Marlboro Team Agostini	Yamaha	Accident	
Ret	(Italy) Marco Lucchinelli	Cagiva Motor Italia	Cagiva	Retired	
Ret	(West Germany) Klaus Klein	Dieter Braun Team	Suzuki	Retired	
Ret	(Netherlands) Rob Punt		Suzuki	Retired	
Ret	(Zimbabwe) Dave Petersen		Suzuki	Accident	
DNS	(United Kingdom) Trevor Nation		Suzuki	Did not start	
DNS	(Italy) Franco Uncini	HB Suzuki GP Team	Suzuki	Did not start	
DNQ	(Netherlands) Hennie Boerman		Suzuki	Did not qualify	
DNQ	(West Germany) Manfred Fischer	Juchem	Suzuki	Did not qualify	
DNQ	(United Kingdom) Kevin Wrettom		Suzuki	Did not qualify	
DNQ	(Denmark) Børge Nielsen		Suzuki	Did not qualify	
DNQ	(Austria) Josef Ragginger		Suzuki	Did not qualify	

Previous race: 1984 Yugoslavian Grand Prix	FIM Grand Prix World Championship; 1984 season	Next race: 1984 Belgian Grand Prix
Previous race: 1983 Dutch TT	Dutch TT	Next race: 1985 Dutch TT
