= Eddie Lawson =

American motorcycle racer (born 1958)

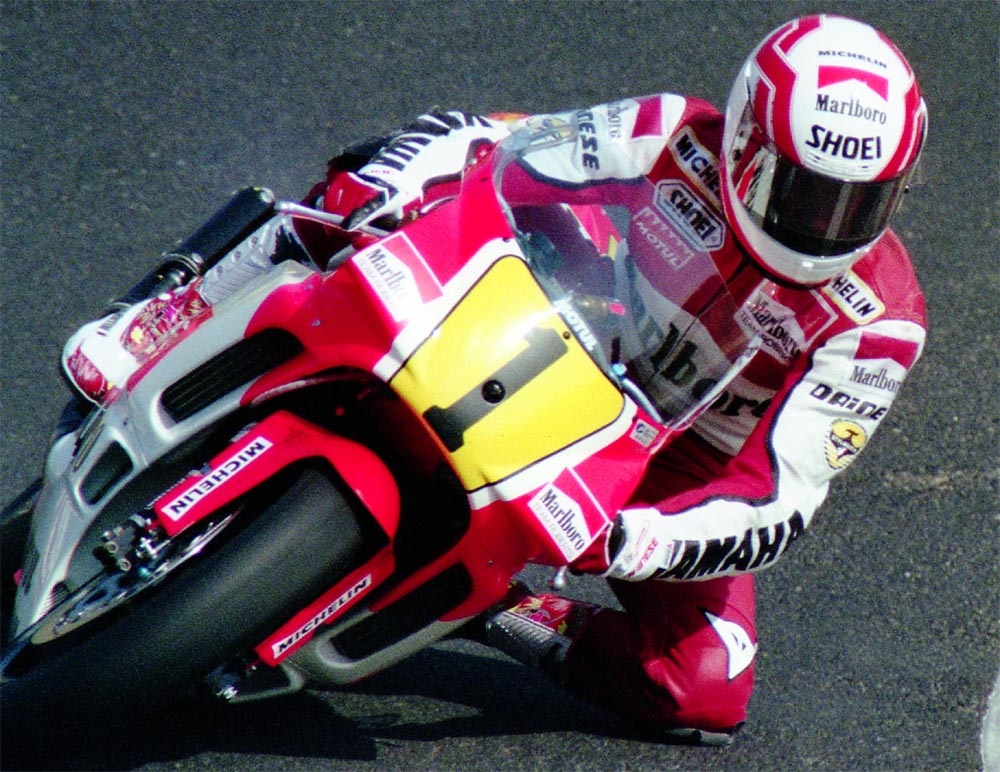
- Lawson aboard the Yamaha YZR500, 1990.
- Nationality: (United States) American
- Born: March 11, 1958 (age 68); Upland, California, U.S.
Motorcycle racing career statistics
Grand Prix motorcycle racing
Active years	1983 – 1992
First race	1983 500cc South African Grand Prix
Last race	1992 500cc South African Grand Prix
First win	1984 500cc South African Grand Prix
Last win	1992 500cc Hungarian Grand Prix
Team(s)	Yamaha, Honda, Cagiva
Championships	500cc – 1984, 1986, 1988, 1989
Starts / Wins / Podiums / Poles / F. laps / Points; 127 / 31 / 78 / 18 / 21 / 1429

Eddie Ray Lawson (born March 11, 1958) is an American former professional motorcycle racer. He competed in the Grand Prix motorcycle racing world championships from 1981 to 1992.

A four-time FIM 500cc road racing world champion, Lawson is prominent for being the first MotoGP competitor to win back-to-back 500cc world championships on machines from two different manufacturers. His record of not crashing and consistently finishing in the points earned him the nickname "Steady Eddie".

Lawson was inducted into the MotoGP Legends Hall of Fame in 2005. After his motorcycle career, Lawson pursued a brief career in open-wheel single seater racing in the United States competing in the Indy Lights series and eventually to the CART racing series.

== Biography ==
Born in Upland, California, Lawson began his motorcycle racing career in the Southern California dirt track circuit. When he was young, Lawson also drove karts, which he "loved … maybe more than racing bikes", but he ultimately pursued a career on motorcycles as his father and grandfather had raced them. When it became increasingly difficult to find machinery able to compete with the dominant Harley-Davidsons, he switched his attention to road racing. In 1979, Lawson finished the season second behind Freddie Spencer in the AMA 250cc road racing National Championship. Afterwards, he was offered a ride with the Kawasaki Superbike team and won the AMA Superbike Series in 1981 and 1982. He also won the AMA 250cc road racing National Championship in 1980 and 1981 for Kawasaki.

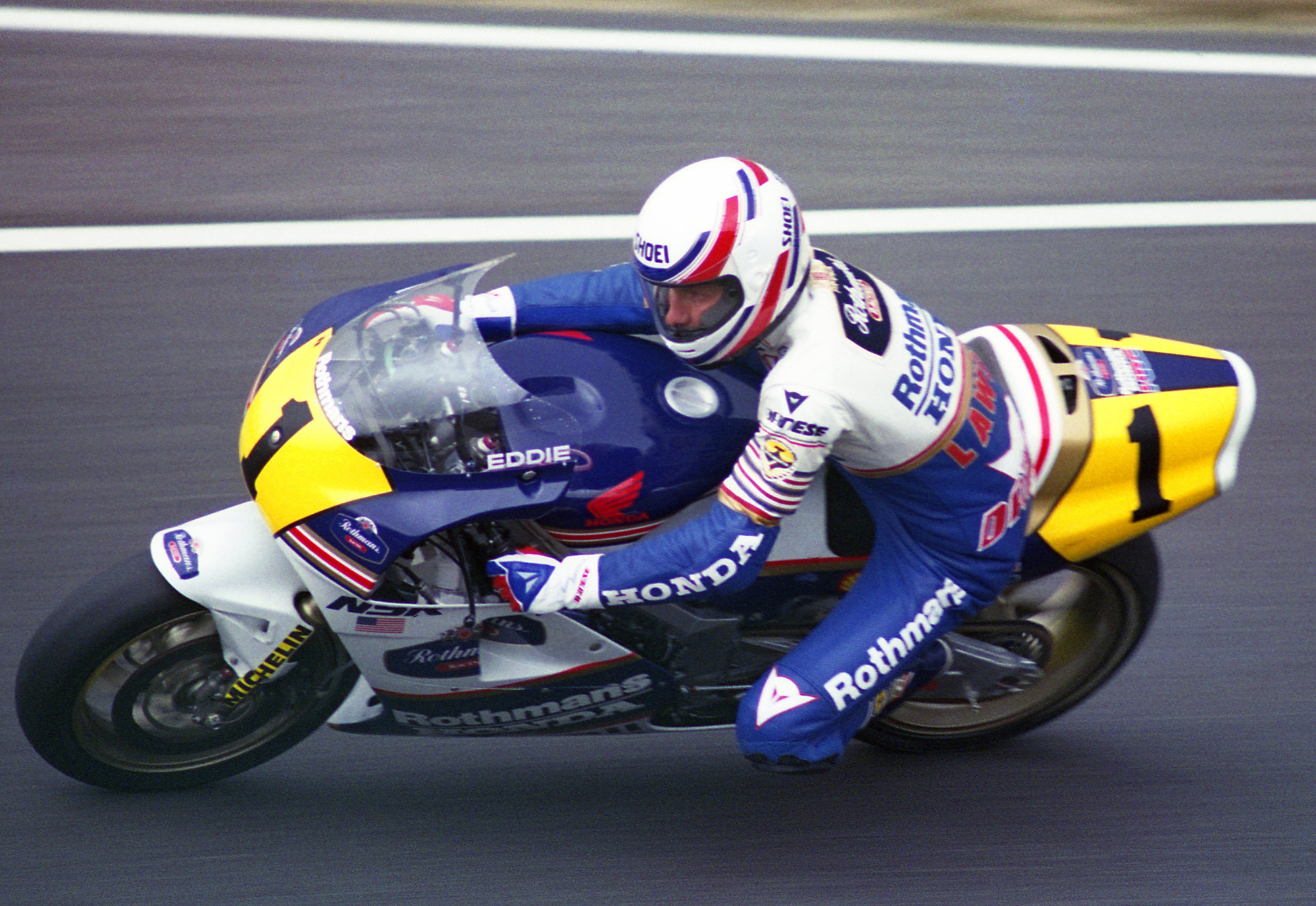
Lawson in 1989 riding a Honda NSR500

Lawson accepted an offer from Yamaha to contest the 500cc World Championship as Kenny Roberts' teammate for the 1983 season. Lawson spent the 1983 season learning the ropes of the Grand Prix circuit. In 1984, Lawson began winning regularly and won the 1984 World Championship. It would mark the first of four world titles Lawson would go on to win.

In 1985, Lawson won the prestigious Imola 200 pre-season race. Lawson began the 1986 season by winning the Daytona 200 in a dominating manner to give Yamaha their first AMA Superbike victory. He took an easy victory in his qualifying heat race and then won the pole position with a track record. After he disposed of early challengers Wayne Rainey and Kevin Schwantz, Lawson won with a race time of one hour, 54 minutes, 49.656 seconds at an average of 106.030 mph, shattering the record for the Daytona 200 set the year before by Freddie Spencer by over three minutes.

After winning two more 500cc world championships for Yamaha in 1986 and 1988, Lawson shocked the racing world by announcing he would be leaving Yamaha to sign with their arch-rivals Rothmans Honda as teammate to his own archrival, Australia's 1987 World Champion Wayne Gardner. By switching teams, Lawson also fulfilled his desire to work with Erv Kanemoto. After Gardner crashed and broke his leg during the third round at Laguna Seca, Lawson went on to win the 1989 title for Honda, becoming the first rider to win back-to-back championships on machines from different manufacturers before Valentino Rossi did so in 2004 (moved from Honda to Yamaha). Furthermore, he was the fourth satellite rider to win the premier class world title before Valentino Rossi did so in 2001, 12 years later.

Lawson then switched to Cagiva in 1991 and the following year he achieved his last victory (that was also the first win for Cagiva after ten years of racing). In so doing, he joined a very limited riders who managed to win races in top class with three different manufacturers, the others being Mike Hailwood (British Norton, MV Agusta, Honda), Randy Mamola (Suzuki, Honda, Yamaha), Loris Capirossi (Yamaha, Honda, Ducati) and Maverick Viñales (Suzuki, Yamaha, Aprilia).

Lawson also won the ABC Superbikers event at Carlsbad, California in 1983 and 1985 which pitted the best riders from several disciplines against each other on a combined dirt and paved course. He was riding a specially equipped factory YZ 490 Yamaha.

In 1990, Lawson won the Suzuka 8 Hours endurance race on a Yamaha FZR750R paired with teammate Tadahiko Taira. When he retired from Grand Prix racing in the early 1990s, he ranked third on the all-time MotoGP class (then known as 500GP) Grand Prix wins list with 31. Lawson came out of retirement to win his second Daytona 200 in 1993.

After finishing his motorcycle career, Lawson pursued a career in open-wheel single seater racing in the United States competing in the Indy Lights series and eventually moving to CART. Lawson enjoyed the driving experience, saying after his first test in an Indy Lights car that "Oh man, this is the greatest thing I've ever done. This is so much fun." In the 1996 IndyCar season, he competed in 11 races with his best results being two sixth-place finishes at U.S. 500 and the Detroit Indy Grand Prix. His passion for speed remains undiminished and the former World Champion now enjoys driving 250cc Superkarts often accompanied by his great friend and rival Wayne Rainey, who races in a specially modified Superkart to cope with his spinal injuries, and historic Formula One cars, with a Walter Wolf Racing WR4 at vintage events.

== Honors ==
- Lawson was inducted into the Motorcycle Hall of Fame in 1999.
- He was inducted in the Motorsports Hall of Fame of America in 2002.
- Lawson was inducted into the FIM MotoGP Hall of Fame in 2005.

== Racing career statistics ==
Points system from 1969 to 1987:

**Position**	1	2	3	4	5	6	7	8	9	10
**Points**	15	12	10	8	6	5	4	3	2	1

Points system from 1988 to 1992:

**Position**	1	2	3	4	5	6	7	8	9	10	11	12	13	14	15
**Points**	20	17	15	13	11	10	9	8	7	6	5	4	3	2	1

(key) (Races in bold indicate pole position; races in italics indicate fastest lap)

Year	Class	Team	Machine	1	2	3	4	5	6	7	8	9	10	11	12	13	14	15	Points	Rank	Wins
1983	500cc	Marlboro Agostini Yamaha	YZR500	RSA; 8	FRA; NC	NAT; 3	GER; 9	ESP; 6	AUT; 2	YUG; 3	NED; 5	BEL; 5	GBR; 4	SWE; 5	SMR; 3				78	4th	0
1984	500cc	Marlboro Agostini Yamaha	YZR500	RSA; 1	NAT; 2	**ESP**; 1	AUT; 1	GER; 2	FRA; 2	YUG; 4	**NED**; 3	BEL; 4	GBR; 2	SWE; 1	SMR; 4				142	**1st**	4
1985	500cc	Marlboro Agostini Yamaha	YZR500	RSA; 1	**ESP**; 2	GER; 4	NAT; 2	AUT; 2	YUG; 1	NED; NC	BEL; 2	FRA; 4	GBR; 2	SWE; 2	**SMR**; 1				133	**2nd**	3
1986	500cc	Marlboro Agostini Yamaha	YZR500	ESP; 2	**NAT**; 1	**GER**; 1	**AUT**; 1	YUG; 1	**NED**; NC	**BEL**; 2	**FRA**; 1	GBR; 3	SWE; 1	**SMR**; 1					139	**1st**	7
1987	500cc	Marlboro Agostini Yamaha	YZR500	JPN; NC	**ESP**; 2	GER; 1	NAT; 2	AUT; NC	YUG; 3	NED; 1	FRA; NC	GBR; 1	SWE; 2	CZE; 2	**SMR**; 2	POR; 1	BRA; 2	ARG; 1	157	**3rd**	5
1988	500cc	Marlboro Agostini Yamaha	YZR500	JPN; 3	USA; 1	ESP; 2	**EXP**; 1	NAT; 1	GER; 4	AUT; 1	NED; 2	BEL; 2	YUG; 10	FRA; 1	GBR; 6	**SWE**; 1	CZE; 2	BRA; 1	252	**1st**	7
1989	500cc	Rothmans Kanemoto Honda	NSR500	JPN; 3	AUS; 5	USA; 3	ESP; 1	NAT; Ret	GER; 2	AUT; 2	YUG; 3	NED; 2	BEL; 1	**FRA**; 1	GBR; 2	SWE; 1	CZE; 2	BRA; 2	228	**1st**	4
1990	500cc	Marlboro Roberts Yamaha	YZR500	JPN; DNF	USA; DNS	ESP; INJ	NAT; INJ	GER; INJ	AUT; INJ	YUG; INJ	NED; 3	BEL; 3	FRA; 5	GBR; 3	SWE; 2	CZE; 3	HUN; 2	AUS; 4	118	7th	0
1991	500cc	Cagiva Corse	GP500	JPN; 6	AUS; 6	USA; 5	ESP; 6	ITA; 3	GER; 4	AUT; 5	EUR; DNF	NED; 4	FRA; 3	GBR; 6	RSM; DNF	CZE; 8	VDM –	MAL –	126	6th	0
1992	500cc	Cagiva Corse	GP500	JPN; 14	AUS; 6	MAL; DNF	ESP; 11	ITA; 11	EUR; 6	GER; 6	**NED**; DNF	HUN; 1	FRA; 5	**GBR**; 4	BRA; 11	RSA; DNF			56	9th	1

=== Suzuka 8 Hours results ===
Year	Team	Co-Rider	Bike	Pos
1990	(Japan) Shiseido Tech 21 Racing Team	(Japan) Tadahiko Taira (United States) Eddie Lawson	Yamaha YZF750	1st

=== American open-wheel racing results ===
(key)

==== Indy Lights ====
Year	Team	1	2	3	4	5	6	7	8	9	10	11	12	Rank	Points
1992	Leading Edge Motorsport	PHX	LBH	DET	POR	MIL	NHA	TOR	CLE	VAN	MDO	NAZ	LS; 18	NC	0
1993	Leading Edge Motorsports	PHX	LBH	MIL	DET	POR; 8	CLE; 9	TOR	NHA; 10	VAN; 3	MDO; 17	NAZ	LS; 2	**12th**	**42**
1994	Tasman Motorsports	PHX; 3	**LBH**; 18	MIL; 2	DET; 2	POR; 3	CLE; 1	TOR; 5	MDO; 2	NHA; 11	VAN; 7	NAZ; 5	LS; 3	**4th**	**139**

==== CART ====
Year	Team	Chassis	Engine	1	2	3	4	5	6	7	8	9	10	11	12	13	14	15	16	Rank	Points	Ref
1996	Galles Racing	Lola T96/00	Mercedes-Benz IC108C	MIA; 15	RIO; 21	SRF; 7	LBH; 9	NZR; 17	500; 6	MIL; 20	DET; 6	POR; 15	CLE; 24	TOR; 15	MIS	MDO	ROA	VAN	LS	**20th**	**26**	
