= 1983 British motorcycle Grand Prix =

(United Kingdom) 1983 British Grand Prix
Race details
- Race 10 of 12 races in the 1983 Grand Prix motorcycle racing season
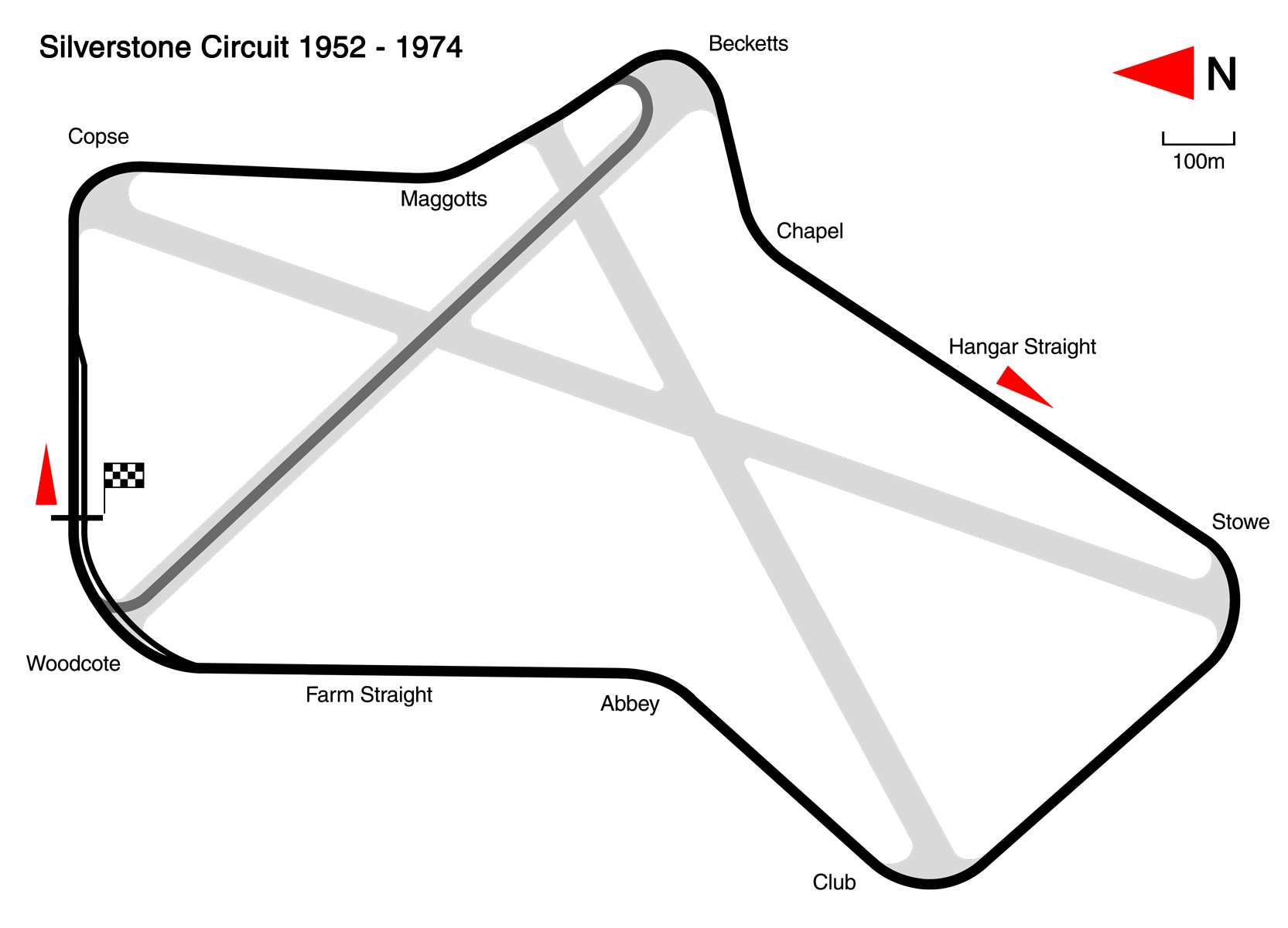
- Date: 31 July 1983
- Official name: Marlboro British Grand Prix
- Location: Silverstone Circuit
- Course: Permanent racing facility; 4.711 km (2.927 mi)

500cc
Pole position
- Rider: (United States) Kenny Roberts
- Time: 1:28.000
Fastest lap
- Rider: (United States) Kenny Roberts
- Time: 1:28.200
Podium
- First: (United States) Kenny Roberts
- Second: (United States) Freddie Spencer
- Third: (United States) Randy Mamola

250cc
Pole position
- Rider: (France) Patrick Fernandez
- Time: 1:34.180
Fastest lap
- Rider: (France) Jacques Bolle
- Time: 1:34.060
Podium
- First: (France) Jacques Bolle
- Second: (France) Thierry Espié
- Third: (France) Christian Sarron

125cc
Pole position
- Rider: (Spain) Ricardo Tormo
- Time: 1:39.260
Fastest lap
- Rider: (Spain) Ángel Nieto
- Time: 1:39.670
Podium
- First: (Spain) Ángel Nieto
- Second: (Switzerland) Bruno Kneubühler
- Third: (Switzerland) Hans Müller

The 1983 British motorcycle Grand Prix was the tenth round of the 1983 Grand Prix motorcycle racing season. It took place on the weekend of 29–31 July 1983 at the Silverstone Circuit.

The race was split into two races. Entering Stowe Corner on Lap 5, Norman Brown's Suzuki slowed with a mechanical problem. The motorcycle stayed to the inside, but was hit by Peter Huber's Suzuki. It was not until the end of Lap 5 that riders began to enter pit lane, as only a yellow and an oil flag was displayed, but not fully across the track. On Lap 6, officials ended up waving the red flag at the starting line. Brown died instantly, while Huber was rushed by helicopter to a hospital in Oxford, where he was pronounced dead.

The race restarted as a split race. The first five completed laps were scored, and the remaining 23 laps were completed shortly after the track was cleared. The total time of the two races combined formed the aggregate time for the results.

== Classification ==
=== 500 cc ===
Pos.	Rider	Team	Machine	Time/Retired	Points
1	(United States) Kenny Roberts	Marlboro Agostini-Yamaha	YZR500	42'19.070	15
2	(United States) Freddie Spencer	HRC-Honda	NS500	+4.110	12
3	(United States) Randy Mamola	HB Sinclair-Suzuki	RG500	+4.200	10
4	(United States) Eddie Lawson	Marlboro Agostini Yamaha	YZR500	+8.370	8
5	(France) Marc Fontan	Sonauto Gauloises-Yamaha	YZR500	+30.750	6
6	(Japan) Takazumi Katayama	HRC-Honda	NS500	+31.480	5
7	(United Kingdom) Ron Haslam	HRC-Honda	NS500	+41.250	4
8	(Netherlands) Boet van Dulmen	Shell Nederland-Suzuki	RG500	+1'13.910	3
9	(United Kingdom) Barry Sheene	Heron-Suzuki	RG500	+1'13.920	2
10	(Australia) Paul Lewis		RG500	+1'26.650	1
11	(United Kingdom) Keith Huewen	Heron-Suzuki	RG500	+1'20.940	
12	(West Germany) Anton Mang	HB Gallina-Suzuki	RG500	+1'24.980	
13	(United Kingdom) Chris Guy		RG500	+2'23.170	
14	(United Kingdom) Mark Salle		RG500	+1 lap	
15	(United Kingdom) Kevin Wrettom		RG500	+1 lap	
16	(Australia) Wayne Gardner	Honda Britain Racing	RS500	+1 lap	
17	(United Kingdom) Steve Henshaw	Harold Coppock	RG500	+1 lap	
18	(France) Franck Gross		RS500	+1 lap	
19	(Republic of Ireland) Alan Irwin		RG500	+1 lap	
20	(Netherlands) Rob Punt	M Woestenburg	RG500	+1 lap	
21	(Republic of Ireland) Con Law		RG500	+1 lap	
22	(Sweden) Peter Sjöström	Jeb’s Helmet Sweden	RG500	+1 lap	
23	(Italy) Maurizio Massimiani	HIRT Italia	RS500	+2 laps	
24	(Switzerland) Philippe Coulon	Marlboro-Suzuki	RG500	+12 laps	
Ret	(United Kingdom) Graham Wood	DTR Fowler Yamaha	YZR500	23 Laps	
Ret	(Italy) Marco Lucchinelli	HRC-Honda	NS500	15 Laps	
Ret	(Switzerland) Sergio Pellandini	Carimati-Pezzani Racing	RG500	14 Laps (c)	
Ret	(Italy) Virginio Ferrari	Cagiva	GP500	13 Laps	
Ret	(United Kingdom) Rob McElnea	Heron-Suzuki	RG500	12 Laps	
Ret	(Switzerland) Wolfgang von Muralt		RG500	11 Laps	
Ret	(Italy) Loris Reggiani	HB Gallina-Suzuki	RG500	11 Laps	
Ret	(Australia) John Pace		RG500	11 Laps	
Ret	(United Kingdom) Dave Dean		RG500	11 Laps	
Ret	(United Kingdom) Gary Lingham	Myers Motorcycles	RG500	11 Laps	
Ret	(Netherlands) Jack Middelburg	Stichting Ned-Honda	RS500	9 Laps	
Ret	(Italy) Leandro Becheroni		RG500	7 Laps	
Ret	(United Kingdom) Simon Buckmaster		RG500	7 Laps	
Ret	(United Kingdom) Norman Brown	Hector Neill Racing	RG500	4 Laps (fatal crash)	
Ret	(Switzerland) Peter Huber		RG500	4 Laps (fatal crash)	
Ret	(Belgium) Didier de Radiguès	Team Johnson Elf	RS500	3 Laps	
Ret	(United Kingdom) Steve Parrish	Mitsui-Yamaha	YZR500	Retired	
DNS	(United Kingdom) Roger Marshall	Honda Britain Racing	RS500	Did not start	
DNQ	(South Africa) Jon Ekerold	Cagiva	GP500	Did not qualify	
DNQ	(Switzerland) Andreas Hofmann		RG500	Did not qualify	
DNQ	(Italy) Fabio Biliotti	Moto Club Condor	RS500	Did not qualify	
DNQ	(Brazil) Marco Greco		RG500	Did not qualify	
DNQ	(New Zealand) Dennis Ireland		RG500	Did not qualify	
DNQ	(Italy) Corrado Tuzii	Beton Bloc Racing	RS500	Did not qualify	
DNQ	(Norway) Beni Slydal		RG500	Did not qualify	
DNQ	(New Zealand) Glenn Williams		YZR500	Did not qualify	

Previous race: 1983 Belgian Grand Prix	FIM Grand Prix World Championship; 1983 season	Next race: 1983 Swedish Grand Prix
Previous race: 1982 British Grand Prix	British Grand Prix	Next race: 1984 British Grand Prix
