= 1984 Belgian motorcycle Grand Prix =

(Belgium) 1984 Belgian Grand Prix
Race details
- Race 9 of 12 races in the 1984 Grand Prix motorcycle racing season
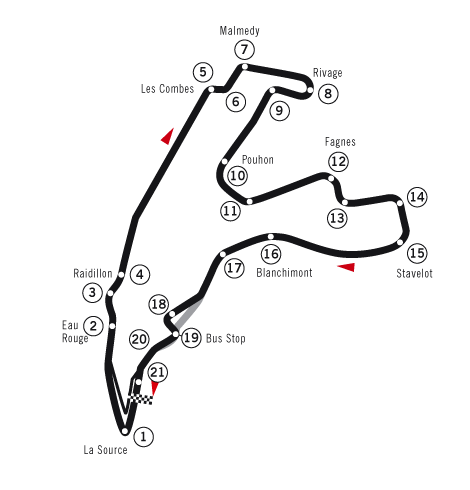
- Date: 8 July 1984
- Official name: Johnson GP of Belgium
- Location: Circuit de Spa-Francorchamps
- Course: Permanent racing facility; 6.940 km (4.312 mi)

500cc
Pole position
- Rider: (United States) Freddie Spencer
- Time: 2:31.660
Fastest lap
- Rider: (United States) Freddie Spencer
- Time: 2:32.780
Podium
- First: (United States) Freddie Spencer
- Second: (United States) Randy Mamola
- Third: (France) Raymond Roche

250cc
Pole position
- Rider: (West Germany) Manfred Herweh
- Time: 2:39.550
Fastest lap
- Rider: (West Germany) Manfred Herweh
- Time: 2:39.990
Podium
- First: (West Germany) Manfred Herweh
- Second: (Spain) Sito Pons
- Third: (France) Christian Sarron

125cc
Pole position
- Rider: No 125cc race was held
Fastest lap
- Rider: No 125cc race was held
Podium
- First: No 125cc race was held
- Second: No 125cc race was held
- Third: No 125cc race was held

80cc
Pole position
- Rider: (Switzerland) Stefan Dörflinger
- Time: 2:55.840
Fastest lap
- Rider: (Switzerland) Stefan Dörflinger
- Time: 2:58.240
Podium
- First: (Switzerland) Stefan Dörflinger
- Second: (Spain) Jorge Martínez
- Third: (Netherlands) Hans Spaan

The 1984 Belgian motorcycle Grand Prix was the ninth round of the 1984 Grand Prix motorcycle racing season. It took place on the weekend of 6–8 July 1984 at the Circuit de Spa-Francorchamps. The race was marred by the fatal accident of rider Kevin Wrettom in practice leading up to the race.

== Classification ==
=== 500 cc ===
Pos.	Rider	Team	Manufacturer	Time/Retired	Points
1	(United States) Freddie Spencer	Honda Racing Corporation	Honda	51'33.170	15
2	(United States) Randy Mamola	RM Promotions	Honda	+5.710	12
3	(France) Raymond Roche	Honda Total	Honda	+6.760	10
4	(United States) Eddie Lawson	Marlboro Team Agostini	Yamaha	+20.250	8
5	(United Kingdom) Ron Haslam	Honda Racing Corporation	Honda	+29.790	6
6	(Japan) Tadahiko Taira		Yamaha	+58.610	5
7	(Australia) Wayne Gardner	Honda Britain	Honda	+1'20.380	4
8	(Switzerland) Sergio Pellandini	HB Suzuki GP Team	Suzuki	+1'22.170	3
9	(United Kingdom) Barry Sheene	Heron Team Suzuki	Suzuki	+1'40.330	2
10	(West Germany) Gustav Reiner	Olymp-Hemden Racing	Honda	+1'59.640	1
11	(Italy) Walter Magliorati		Suzuki	+2'01.440	
12	(France) Franck Gross		Honda	+2'10.400	
13	(Switzerland) Wolfgang von Muralt	Frankonia-Suzuki	Suzuki	+2'11.600	
14	(Zimbabwe) Dave Petersen		Suzuki	+2'20.100	
15	(Italy) Lorenzo Ghiselli		Suzuki	+2'30.030	
16	(United Kingdom) Steve Parrish		Yamaha	+2'34.600	
17	(Finland) Eero Hyvärinen		Suzuki	+2'37.260	
18	(Italy) Fabio Biliotti		Honda	+1 lap	
19	(United Kingdom) Mark Salle		Suzuki	+1 lap	
20	(West Germany) Klaus Klein	Dieter Braun Team	Suzuki	+1 lap	
21	(Denmark) Børge Nielsen		Suzuki	+1 lap	
22	(South Africa) Brett Hudson	Romer Racing Suisse	Honda	+1 lap	
Ret	(France) Hervé Moineau	Cagiva Motor Italia	Cagiva	Retired	
Ret	(Switzerland) Marco Gentile		Yamaha	Retired	
Ret	(West Germany) Reinhold Roth	Romer Racing Suisse	Honda	Retired	
Ret	(France) Louis-Luc Maisto		Honda	Retired	
Ret	(Italy) Leandro Beccheroni		Suzuki	Retired	
Ret	(Italy) Virginio Ferrari	Marlboro Team Agostini	Yamaha	Accident	
Ret	(Belgium) Didier de Radiguès	Team Elf Chevallier Johnson	Honda	Retired	
Ret	(United Kingdom) Keith Huewen	David Attwood	Honda	Retired	
Ret	(Italy) Massimo Broccoli		Honda	Retired	
Ret	(Australia) Paul Lewis		Suzuki	Retired	
Ret	(Netherlands) Rob Punt		Suzuki	Accident	
Ret	(Netherlands) Henk van der Mark		Honda	Retired	
Ret	(Netherlands) Boet van Dulmen		Suzuki	Retired	
Ret	(France) Christian Le Liard	Team Elf Chevallier Johnson	Honda	Retired	
DNS	(Italy) Attilio Riondato	Heron Team Suzuki	Suzuki	Did not start	
DNS	(United Kingdom) Kevin Wrettom		Suzuki	Fatal accident in practice	

Previous race: 1984 Dutch TT	FIM Grand Prix World Championship; 1984 season	Next race: 1984 British Grand Prix
Previous race: 1983 Belgian Grand Prix	Belgian Grand Prix	Next race: 1985 Belgian Grand Prix
