= 1984 Swedish motorcycle Grand Prix =

(Sweden) 1984 Swedish Grand Prix
Race details
- Race 11 of 12 races in the 1984 Grand Prix motorcycle racing season
- Date: 12 August 1984
- Official name: Swedish TT
- Location: Scandinavian Raceway
- Course: Permanent racing facility; 4.031 km (2.505 mi)

500cc
Pole position
- Rider: (United Kingdom) Ron Haslam
- Time: 1:38.800
Fastest lap
- Rider: Unknown
Podium
- First: (United States) Eddie Lawson
- Second: (France) Raymond Roche
- Third: (Australia) Wayne Gardner

250cc
Pole position
- Rider: (West Germany) Manfred Herweh
- Time: 1:42.170
Fastest lap
- Rider: Unknown
Podium
- First: (West Germany) Manfred Herweh
- Second: (France) Christian Sarron
- Third: (Switzerland) Jacques Cornu

125cc
Pole position
- Rider: (France) Jean-Claude Selini
- Time: 1:47.660
Fastest lap
- Rider: Unknown
Podium
- First: (Italy) Fausto Gresini
- Second: (Austria) August Auinger
- Third: (Italy) Eugenio Lazzarini

80cc
Pole position
- Rider: No 80cc race was held
Fastest lap
- Rider: No 80cc race was held
Podium
- First: No 80cc race was held
- Second: No 80cc race was held
- Third: No 80cc race was held

The 1984 Swedish motorcycle Grand Prix was the eleventh round of the 1984 Grand Prix motorcycle racing season. It took place on the weekend of 9–12 August at the Scandinavian Raceway.

== Classification ==
=== 500 cc ===
Pos.	Rider	Team	Manufacturer	Time/Retired	Points
1	(United States) Eddie Lawson	Marlboro Team Agostini	Yamaha	50'01.030	15
2	(France) Raymond Roche	Honda Total	Honda	+3.140	12
3	(Australia) Wayne Gardner	Honda Britain	Honda	+19.480	10
4	(Japan) Takazumi Katayama	Honda Racing Corporation	Honda	+36.360	8
5	(United Kingdom) Rob McElnea	Heron Team Suzuki	Suzuki	+53.530	6
6	(Italy) Virginio Ferrari	Marlboro Team Agostini	Yamaha	+55.700	5
7	(Netherlands) Boet van Dulmen		Suzuki	+57.920	4
8	(Switzerland) Wolfgang von Muralt	Frankonia-Suzuki	Suzuki	+1'17.720	3
9	(United Kingdom) Keith Huewen	David Attwood	Honda	+1'37.740	2
10	(Finland) Eero Hyvärinen		Suzuki	+1'43.140	1
11	(United Kingdom) Roger Burnett		Suzuki	+1 lap	
12	(Sweden) Peter Linden		Suzuki	+1 lap	
13	(Italy) Paolo Ferretti		Suzuki	+1 lap	
14	(Sweden) Anders Andersson		Suzuki	+1 lap	
15	(Denmark) Kjeld Sørensen		Suzuki	+1 lap	
16	(Switzerland) Christopher Bürki	Romer Racing Suisse	Suzuki	+1 lap	
17	(Finland) Esko Kuparinen		Suzuki	+2 laps	
18	(Finland) Timo Pohjola		Yamaha	+2 laps	
19	(Sweden) Peter Sköld		Honda	+2 laps	
Ret	(West Germany) Gustav Reiner	Olymp-Hemden Racing	Honda	Retired	
Ret	(France) Christian le Liard	Team Elf Chevallier Johnson	Chevallier	Retired	
Ret	(Belgium) Didier de Radiguès	Team Elf Chevallier Johnson	Honda	Retired	
Ret	(United States) Randy Mamola	RM Promotions	Honda	Retired	
Ret	(United Kingdom) Ron Haslam	Honda Racing Corporation	Honda	Retired	
Ret	(West Germany) Reinhold Roth	Romer Racing Suisse	Honda	Retired	
Ret	(Switzerland) Sergio Pellandini	HB Suzuki GP Team	Suzuki	Retired	
Ret	(United Kingdom) Steve Parrish		Yamaha	Retired	
Ret	(Netherlands) Rob Punt		Suzuki	Retired	
Ret	(Italy) Lorenzo Ghiselli		Suzuki	Retired	
Ret	(Italy) Fabio Biliotti		Honda	Retired	
Ret	(France) Louis-Luc Maisto		Honda	Retired	
Ret	(Italy) Leandro Beccheroni		Suzuki	Retired	
Ret	(Italy) Franco Uncini	HB Suzuki GP Team	Suzuki	Accident	
Ret	(West Germany) Klaus Klein	Dieter Braun Team	Suzuki	Retired	
Ret	(United Kingdom) Barry Sheene	Heron Team Suzuki	Suzuki	Retired	
Ret	(Switzerland) Marco Gentile		Yamaha	Retired	
DNQ	(Denmark) Börge Nielsen		Suzuki	Did not qualify	
DNQ	(Sweden) Lars Johansson		Suzuki	Did not qualify	
DNQ	(Italy) Massimo Broccoli		Honda	Did not qualify	
DNQ	(Sweden) Gunnar Bruhn		Yamaha	Did not qualify	
DNQ	(Sweden) Benny Mortensen		Suzuki	Did not qualify	

Previous race: 1984 British Grand Prix	FIM Grand Prix World Championship; 1984 season	Next race: 1984 San Marino Grand Prix
Previous race: 1983 Swedish Grand Prix	Swedish Grand Prix	Next race: 1985 Swedish Grand Prix
