= 1984 British motorcycle Grand Prix =

(United Kingdom) 1984 British Grand Prix
Race details
- Race 10 of 12 races in the 1984 Grand Prix motorcycle racing season
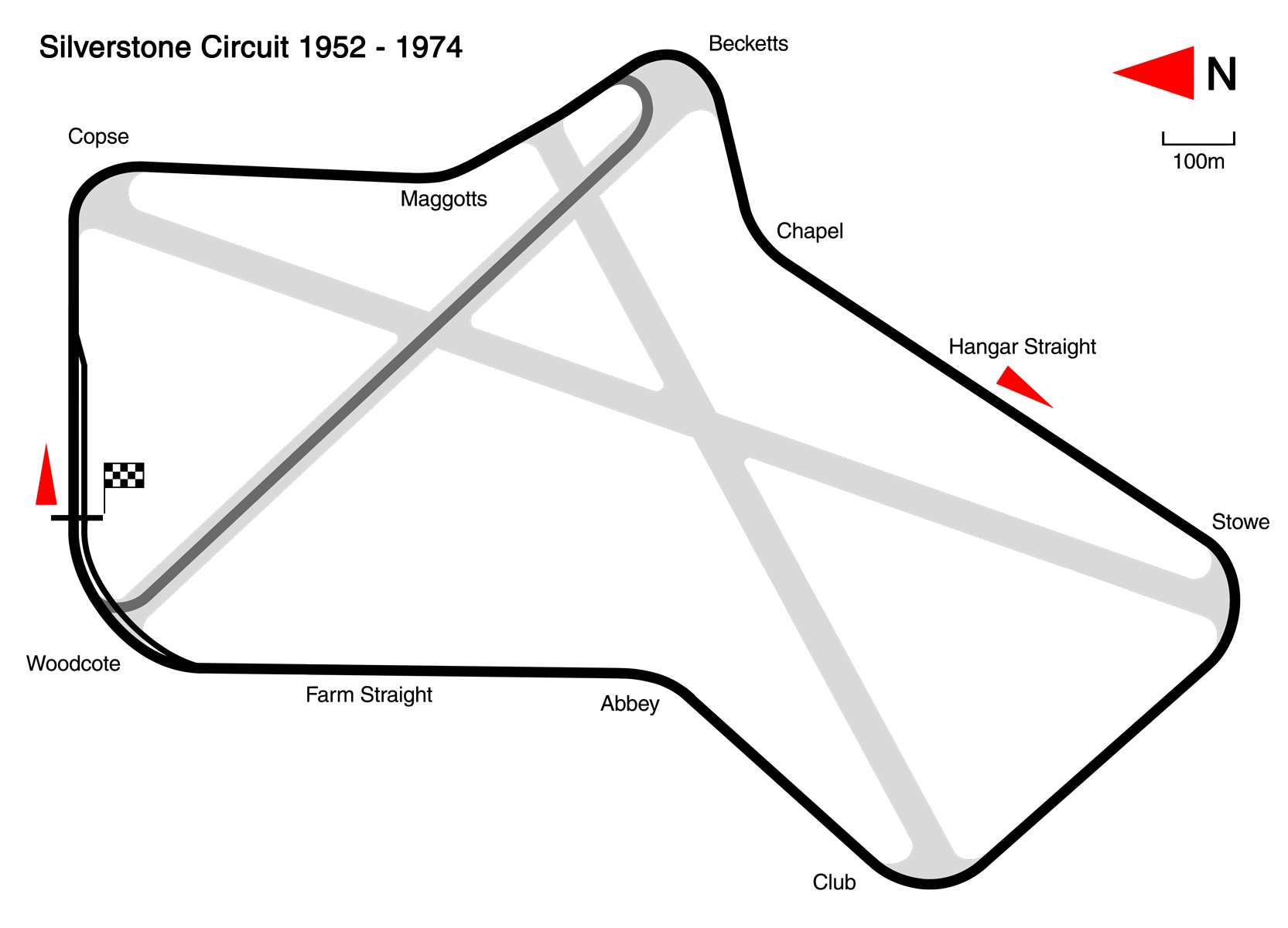
- Date: 5 August 1984
- Official name: Marlboro British Grand Prix
- Location: Silverstone Circuit
- Course: Permanent racing facility; 4.711 km (2.927 mi)

500cc
Pole position
- Rider: (France) Raymond Roche
- Time: 1:28.800
Fastest lap
- Rider: Unknown
Podium
- First: (United States) Randy Mamola
- Second: (United States) Eddie Lawson
- Third: (United Kingdom) Ron Haslam

250cc
Pole position
- Rider: (West Germany) Manfred Herweh
- Time: 1:33.260
Fastest lap
- Rider: Unknown
Podium
- First: (France) Christian Sarron
- Second: (United Kingdom) Andy Watts
- Third: (Venezuela) Carlos Lavado

125cc
Pole position
- Rider: (Switzerland) Bruno Kneubühler
- Time: 1:39.540
Fastest lap
- Rider: Unknown
Podium
- First: (Spain) Ángel Nieto
- Second: (France) Jean-Claude Selini
- Third: (Italy) Fausto Gresini

80cc
Pole position
- Rider: No 80cc race was held
Fastest lap
- Rider: No 80cc race was held
Podium
- First: No 80cc race was held
- Second: No 80cc race was held
- Third: No 80cc race was held

The 1984 British motorcycle Grand Prix was the tenth round of the 1984 Grand Prix motorcycle racing season. It took place on the weekend of 3–5 August 1984 at the Silverstone Circuit.

== Classification ==
=== 500 cc ===
Pos.	Rider	Team	Manufacturer	Time/Retired	Points
1	(United States) Randy Mamola	RM Promotions	Honda	42'18.640	15
2	(United States) Eddie Lawson	Marlboro Team Agostini	Yamaha	+2.450	12
3	(United Kingdom) Ron Haslam	Honda Racing Corporation	Honda	+18.260	10
4	(Italy) Virginio Ferrari	Marlboro Team Agostini	Yamaha	+35.910	8
5	(United Kingdom) Barry Sheene	Heron Team Suzuki	Suzuki	+36.470	6
6	(Australia) Wayne Gardner	Honda Britain	Honda	+49.250	5
7	(United Kingdom) Rob McElnea	Heron Team Suzuki	Suzuki	+1'09.780	4
8	(Japan) Takazumi Katayama	Honda Racing Corporation	Honda	+1'09.810	3
9	(United Kingdom) Roger Marshall	Honda Britain	Honda	+1'09.940	2
10	(France) Christian le Liard	Team Elf Chevallier Johnson	Chevallier	+1'14.320	1
11	(Italy) Franco Uncini	HB Suzuki GP Team	Suzuki	+1'14.550	
12	(West Germany) Reinhold Roth	Romer Racing Suisse	Honda	+1'25.140	
13	(United Kingdom) Keith Huewen	David Attwood	Honda	+1'30.300	
14	(United Kingdom) Mark Salle		Suzuki	+1'30.420	
15	(United Kingdom) Paul Iddon		Suzuki	+1'30.720	
16	(United Kingdom) Steve Parrish		Yamaha	+1'32.250	
17	(United Kingdom) Mick Grant	Heron Team Suzuki	Suzuki	+1 lap	
18	(Italy) Fabio Biliotti		Honda	+1 lap	
19	(Netherlands) Boet van Dulmen		Suzuki	+1 lap	
20	(United Kingdom) Trevor Nation		Suzuki	+1 lap	
21	(United Kingdom) Graham Wood		Yamaha	+1 lap	
22	(United Kingdom) Simon Buckmaster		Suzuki	+1 lap	
23	(Netherlands) Rob Punt		Suzuki	+1 lap	
24	(Netherlands) Mile Pajic		Honda	+1 lap	
25	(Italy) Massimo Broccoli		Honda	+1 lap	
26	(France) Louis-Luc Maisto		Honda	+2 laps	
27	(Italy) Paolo Ferretti		Suzuki	+2 laps	
28	(Switzerland) Christopher Bürki		Suzuki	+2 laps	
29	(Italy) Lorenzo Ghiselli		Suzuki	+2 laps	
30	(United Kingdom) Alan Irwin		Suzuki	+6 laps	
Ret	(Belgium) Didier de Radiguès	Team Elf Chevallier Johnson	Honda	Retired	
Ret	(United Kingdom) David Griffith		Suzuki	Retired	
Ret	(Australia) Paul Lewis		Suzuki	Accident	
Ret	(Switzerland) Wolfgang von Muralt	Frankonia-Suzuki	Suzuki	Retired	
Ret	(West Germany) Klaus Klein	Dieter Braun Team	Suzuki	Retired	
Ret	(France) Gary Lingham		Suzuki	Retired	
Ret	(Italy) Leandro Beccheroni		Suzuki	Accident	
Ret	(Netherlands) Henk van der Mark		Honda	Retired	
Ret	(France) Raymond Roche	Honda Total	Honda	Retired	
Ret	(Switzerland) Sergio Pellandini	HB Suzuki GP Team	Suzuki	Retired	
Ret	(United Kingdom) Roger Burnett		Suzuki	Retired	
Ret	(Republic of Ireland) Joey Dunlop		Honda	Retired	
DNS	(France) Hervé Moineau	Cagiva Motor Italia	Cagiva	Did not start	

Previous race: 1984 Belgian Grand Prix	FIM Grand Prix World Championship; 1984 season	Next race: 1984 Swedish Grand Prix
Previous race: 1983 British Grand Prix	British Grand Prix	Next race: 1985 British Grand Prix
