= Wayne Gardner =

Australian motorcycle racer (born 1959)

Wayne Gardner AM
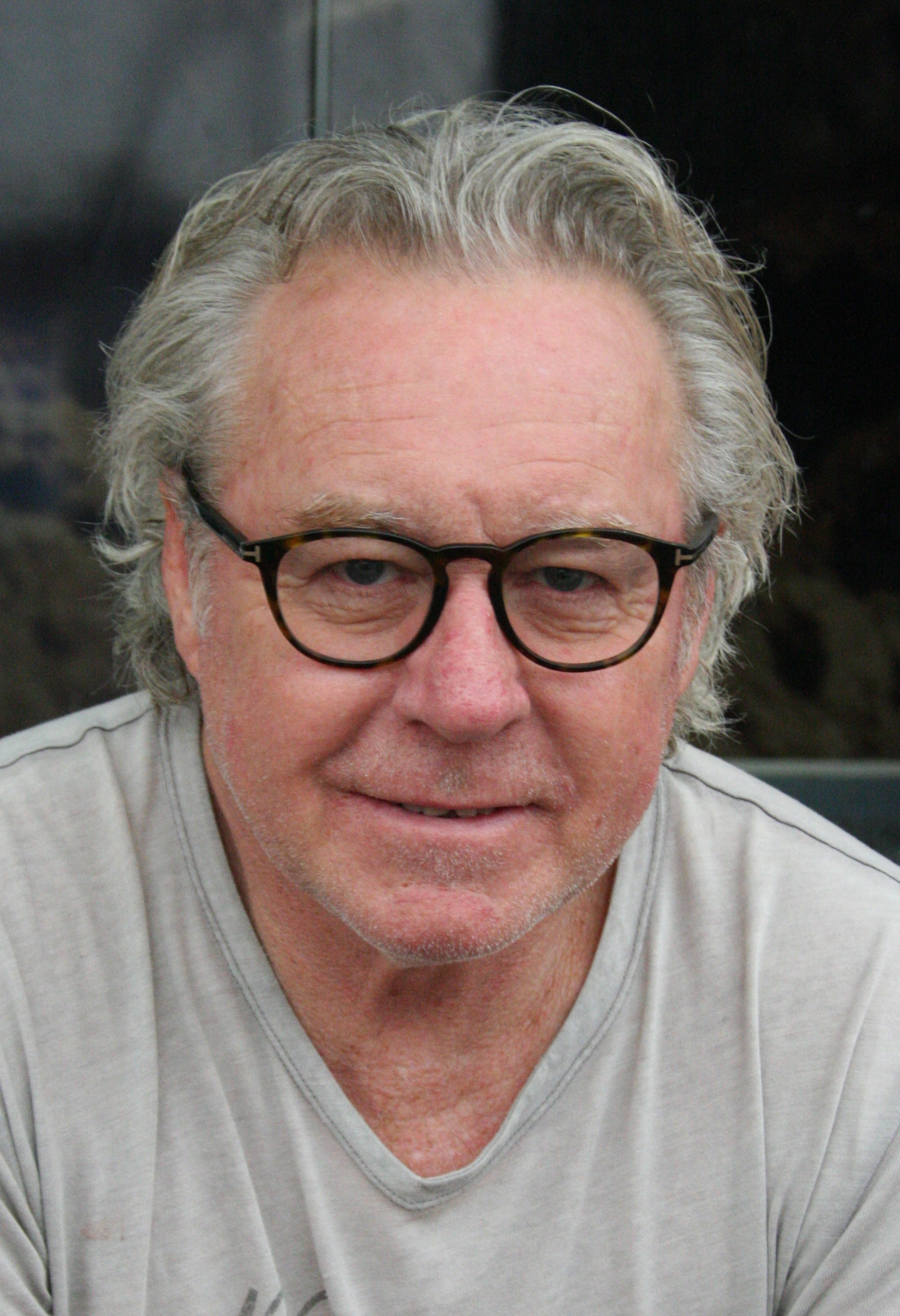
- Gardner in 2018
- Nationality: Australian
- Born: 11 October 1959 (age 67); Wollongong, New South Wales, Australia
Motorcycle racing career statistics
Grand Prix motorcycle racing
Active years	1983–1992
First race	1983 500cc Dutch TT
Last race	1992 500cc South African Grand Prix
First win	1986 500cc Spanish Grand Prix
Last win	1992 500cc British Grand Prix
Team	Honda
Championships	500 cc – 1987
Starts / Wins / Podiums / Poles / F. laps / Points; 102 / 18 / 51 / 19 / 19 / 1074

Wayne Michael Gardner AM (born 11 October 1959) is an Australian former professional motorcycle and touring car racer. He competed in the Grand Prix motorcycle racing world championships from 1986 to 1992, most prominently as a member of the Honda factory racing team where he became the first Australian to win motorcycling's premier class in 1987. His success on the world motorcycle road racing circuit earned him the nickname The Wollongong Whiz.

After his motorcycle racing career, Gardner competed in touring car racing from 1993 to 2002. Both of his sons, Remy and Luca, are motorcycle racers.

== Motorcycle racing career ==
Gardner was born in Wollongong, New South Wales, Australia. He began his racing career in 1977 at the age of 18, riding a second-hand Yamaha TZ250 bike in the Australian championship and finishing second on debut at Amaroo Park. He went on to record his first win a few weeks later at Oran Park Raceway. In 1981, Gardner was hired by Mamoru Moriwaki to race in the Australian Superbike championship aboard the Moriwaki Kawasaki Kz1000s. Gardner and co-rider John Pace qualified their Moriwaki Kawasaki on pole position at the prestigious 1981 Suzuka 8 Hours, ahead of all the major factory racing teams.

Fellow racer, Graeme Crosby gave Gardner his first opportunity to race in Europe. Although Crosby was contracted to ride for Suzuki, he decided to sponsor Gardner to compete in the British Superbike championship riding Kawasakis run by the British Moriwaki concession owned by Crosby. On the way to Europe, Gardner rode the Moriwaki Kawasaki to an impressive fourth-place finish at the 1981 Daytona Superbike race behind Yoshimura Suzuki riders Crosby, Wes Cooley and Honda's Freddie Spencer. Moriwaki and Gardner proceeded to compete in the British championship, winning their first race in England. Gardner entered the final race of the season with a chance to win the title but, an engine misfire relegated him to third place overall in the championship.

Gardner's impressive results on the Moriwaki Kawasaki eventually earned him a contract with the Honda Britain racing team. He rode a Honda to a fourth-place finish in the 1982 Formula TT championship. Gardner made his 500 cc Grand Prix debut with the Honda Britain team at the 1983 Dutch TT during which he was involved in an accident with reigning world champion, Franco Uncini. Uncini fell off his bike as he was exiting a corner and as he tried to run off the track, he was struck on his helmet by Gardner's bike. Uncini went into a coma but, subsequently recovered from his injuries. Gardner failed to score any points in the two Grand Prix races he had entered in 1983. In 1984, he won the British 500cc national championship for Honda and was able to compete in five Grand Prix world championship races. He scored points in all five of the Grand Prix races in which he was able to compete in during 1984, including an impressive third-place finish at the Swedish Grand Prix, earning a seventh place in the final championship standings.

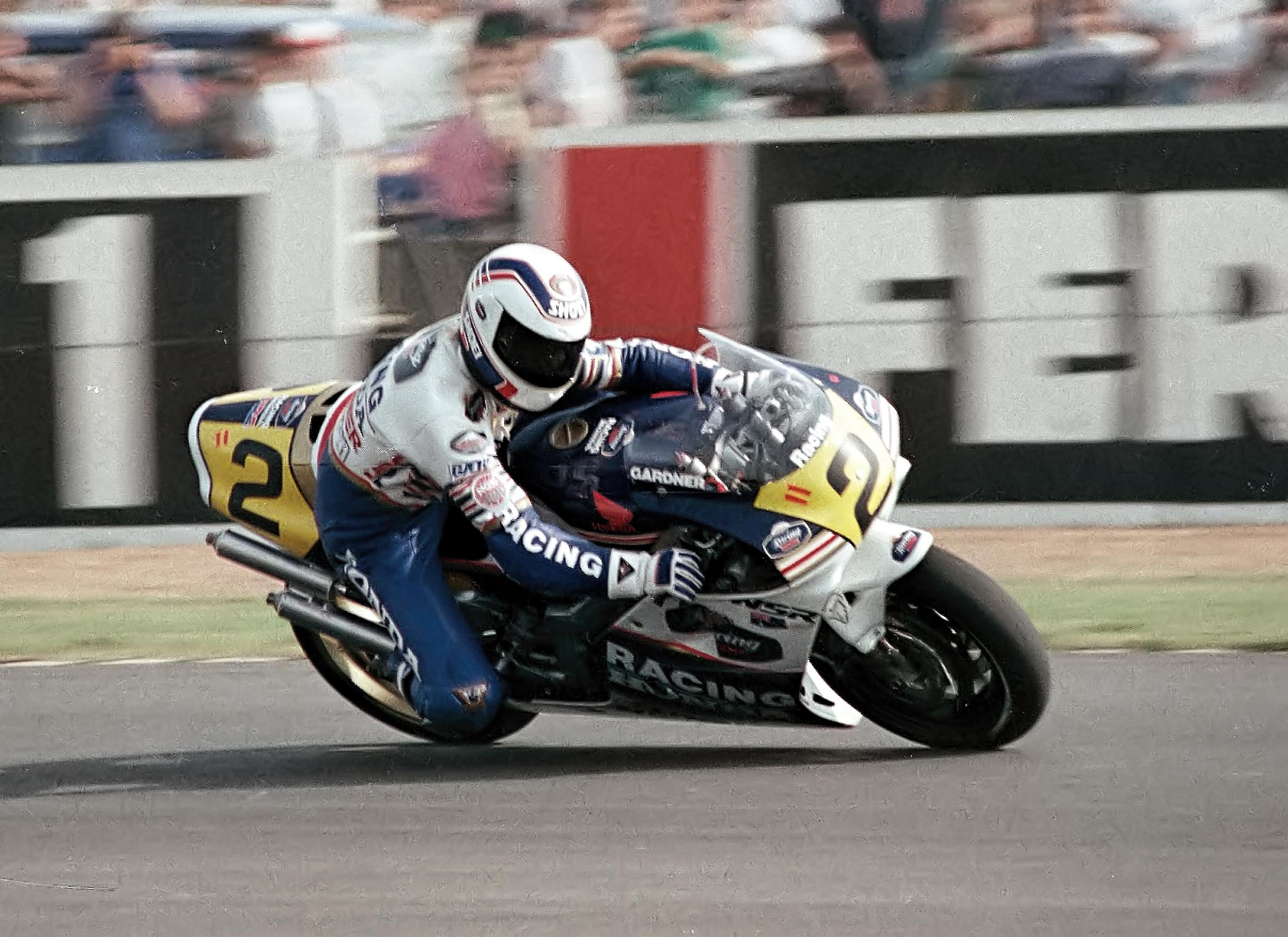
Gardner at the 1989 British Grand Prix

Gardner's performance earned him full support in 1986 from the Honda-HRC factory racing team alongside teammate Freddie Spencer. He won his first Grand Prix race at the Spanish Grand Prix, before going on to win two more races and finish second in the championship behind Eddie Lawson. In 1987, Gardner became the first Australian to win the 500 cc World Championship, winning seven of sixteen races and wrapping up the title with a win in the penultimate round in Brazil at Goiânia. Gardner's race engineer in 1987 was fellow Australian Jeremy Burgess who had previously worked with 1985 World Champion Freddie Spencer.

In defense of his title in 1988, Gardner was hampered by the Honda NSR500 not being easy to ride. He finished second in the championship behind American Eddie Lawson who rode for the factory Marlboro Yamaha team. He still managed wins in the Netherlands, Belgium, Yugoslavia and Czechoslovakia, and would have won at the Paul Ricard Circuit in France had he not suffered mechanical problems only a third of a lap from the finish while holding a 2-second lead.

Gardner's 1987 World Championship saw a sharp rise in the popularity of Grand Prix Motorcycle racing in Australia, with increased television and print media coverage. This led to the inaugural running of the Australian motorcycle Grand Prix at Phillip Island in 1989. The Wollongong Whiz gave the home crowd something to cheer as he won his home race in 1989, just edging out Wayne Rainey and Christian Sarron. Unfortunately his season came unglued at the next round at Laguna Seca where he crashed and broke his leg, causing him to miss half of the season. From the 1985 season, Gardner raced for the factory Rothmans Honda team and was joined on that team by fellow Australian Michael Doohan in 1989. Ironically, Eddie Lawson also joined Rothmans Honda in 1989 and went on to win his fourth World Championship.

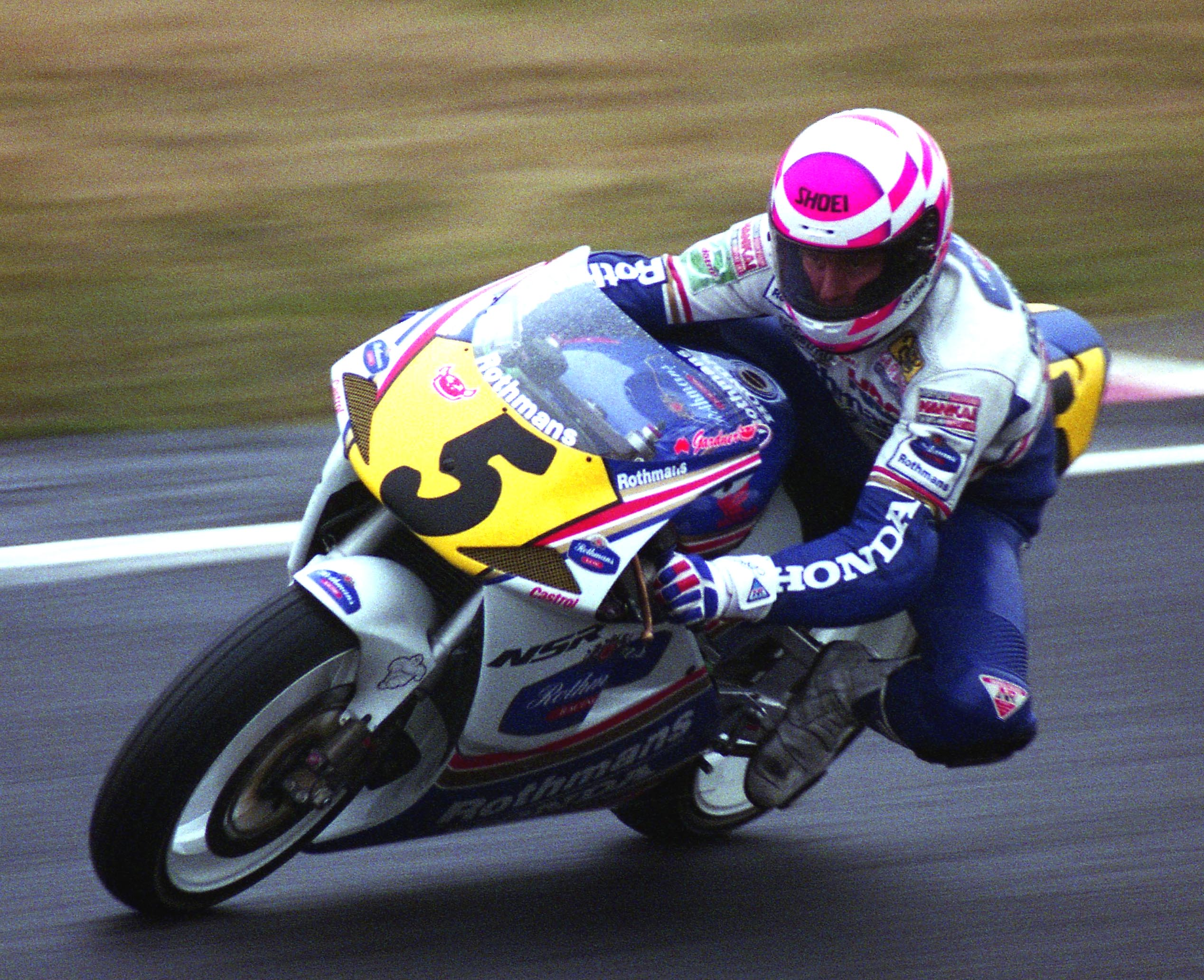
Gardner at the 1992 Japanese Grand Prix

Gardner had a frustrating season in 1990. After winning at Jerez in Spain, he missed three rounds through injury and only managed fifth in the World Championship. He did finish the season on a high note though, winning his second straight Australian Motorcycle Grand Prix at Phillip Island from teammate Mick Doohan and World Champion elect Wayne Rainey. For over half the race, Gardner had to contend with the fairing of his Honda threatening to part company with the bike after some of the front mountings had broken.

Gardner also won four Suzuka 8 Hours races in 1985, 1986, 1991 and 1992. Gardner retired from motorcycle racing following the 1992 season but stayed closely involved with the sport, helping various riders like Daryl Beattie early in their careers. He rode at special events like the Goodwood Festival of Speed on classic Honda motorcycles and raced again at the Goodwood race meeting against fellow bikers James Whitham, the late Barry Sheene and ex-Formula One driver Damon Hill.

== Four-wheel racing career ==
Wayne Gardner
- Nationality: Australian
- Born: 11 October 1959 (age 67) Wollongong, NSW, Australia
- Retired: 2002

All Japan Grand Touring Car Championship
- Years active: 1996-2002
- Teams: TOM's
- Starts: 41
- Wins: 2
- Poles: 1
- Fastest laps: 3
- Best finish: 6th in 2001

Previous series
- 1990 1992 1993-2002: Australian Drivers' Championship; Deutsche Tourenwagen Meisterschaft; V8 Supercars

Gardner's first foray into car racing came when he was to race a Formula Holden in the final round of the 1990 Australian Drivers' Championship which was run as a support race to that years Australian Formula One Grand Prix, driving a Shrike 002 built and developed for the category by the students of the Croydon Park Institute of TAFE in Adelaide where the race was held. After only arriving in Adelaide on the opening day of practice having spent the previous week in Japan testing his 1991 NSR500 Grand Prix bike, Gardner had qualified in a credible 11th place for his first competitive drive in an Open-wheel car. However, a crash into the wall just past the chicane at the end of the pit straight when he spun on coolant that had been dropped by the Ralt RT20 of Drew Price, heavily damaged the front of the car. He was hopeful that the car could be repaired for the race, but his chances ended when another car also spun on the coolant and crashed into the Shrike damaging it beyond immediate repair.

Following his retirement from the 500 cc championship at the end of 1992, Gardner turned his interests to four-wheeled motorsport. He began his touring car career in 1992, driving the Raider Motorsport built Bob Forbes Racing Holden VN Commodore SS Group A, leased by Graham Moore for the 1992 Tooheys 1000 at Bathurst. The Moore/Gardner Commodore finished the crash shortened race in 26th place after qualifying 21st. Gardner's first drive in the race happened to be soon after the circuit was hit by rain which lasted for almost two hours, and his cause was not helped by the Commodore's windscreen de-mister not working which saw the screen fog up making visibility, already poor due to the heavy rain and fog on The Mountain, almost impossible. Also in 1992, Gardner raced 4 events in the German DTM for the Jagermeister-sponsored Linder Team running the #20 BMW E30 M3 Sport Evolution alongside team mate Armin Hahne, with little success.

In 1993, Gardner was recruited to drive a VP Commodore for the Holden Racing Team in the 1993 Australian Touring Car Championship, the first year of the 5.0 litre touring cars which later became the V8 Supercars. In November 1993, Gardner won one of the Group A support races at the Australian Grand Prix in Adelaide, after earlier in the year finishing third Tooheys 1000 co-driving with Brad Jones. Many incidents while driving for the Holden Racing Team in 1993 led to him being given the nickname "Captain Chaos", and it was thought that his continued on-track clashes was what had led to his brief suspension from the team for that year's Sandown 500, though the real reason was that Gardner had been openly talking to both Holden and Coca-Cola about starting his own team.

For the 1994 season, Gardner formed his own team, Wayne Gardner Racing (sponsored by Coca-Cola), where he raced for three seasons with teammate, Channel 7 commentator Neil Crompton. The team's low point came at the Bathurst round of the 1995 ATCC in March. Soon after the start of the first heat, Crompton was hit by the VP Commodore of Phil Ward. This pushed him straight into Gardner's car and both of the Coke sponsored cars ended their race in the wall before they got to Hell Corner on the first lap (Ward continued on with little to no damage). The team recovered though and Gardner sensationally won the start and led the opening laps of the 1995 Tooheys 1000, before he and Crompton went on to finish 3rd in the race, while their teammates Brad Jones and former Bathurst winner Win Percy finished 5th, only a few seconds behind.

Gardner's ATCC highlight was winning the 1997 Calder Park round, held under lights at Calder Park Raceway. Following the withdrawal of their major sponsor Coca-Cola who chose instead to invest in the upcoming Sydney Olympics in 2000, thus losing a rumoured $2 million a year in sponsorship which made it basically impossible for the team to function financially, the team folded after a partial 1999 season with a leased car from Perkins Engineering, but he continued racing V8 Supercars until 2002, with the highlight of taking pole position for the FAI 1000 at Bathurst in 2000, in appalling conditions. Wayne Gardner also took a surprise win in the first round in the V8 Supercar Championship's inaugural season in 1997, at Calder Park Raceway. It was surprising, as Gardner had announced that due to a lack of available funds, it was unlikely that he would race the full 1997 season, and he wasn't considered a race or championship favourite.

Gardner also made a foray into the All Japan Grand Touring Car Championship, racing a works Toyota Supra in 1996, and raced in this competition until his retirement from motorsport in 2002. He won a round of the championship in 1999 (at Fuji Speedway) and 2001 (at Sportsland SUGO). He also had the distinction in 2001 of being the only Toyota driver to finish every race that season, and he also finished every race in the points.

Gardner made a one-off appearance at the 1998 24 Hours of Le Mans. Gardner was entered in the Riley & Scott with Philippe Gache and fellow ex-motorcycle rider Didier de Radiguès. They qualified 26th, but failed to finish due to engine problems after completing 155 laps.

== Honours ==
- Following his victory in the 1987 500 cc World Championship, Gardner was made a Member of the Order of Australia (AM) in the 1988 Birthday Honours for service to the sport of motorcycle racing.
- The Fédération Internationale de Motocyclisme honored him as a MotoGP Legend.
- He was inducted into the Sport Australia Hall of Fame in 1991.
- He received an Australian Sports Medal in 2000.
- The main straight at Phillip Island Grand Prix Circuit is named the Gardner Straight in his honour.

== Grand Prix career statistics ==
Points system from 1969 to 1987:

**Position**	1	2	3	4	5	6	7	8	9	10
**Points**	15	12	10	8	6	5	4	3	2	1

Points system from 1988 to 1992:

**Position**	1	2	3	4	5	6	7	8	9	10	11	12	13	14	15
**Points**	20	17	15	13	11	10	9	8	7	6	5	4	3	2	1

(key) (Races in bold indicate pole position; races in italics indicate fastest lap)

Year	Class	Team	Machine	1	2	3	4	5	6	7	8	9	10	11	12	13	14	15	Points	Rank	Wins
1983	500cc	Honda Britain	NS500	RSA	FRA	NAT	GER	ESP	AUT	YUG	NED; NC	BEL	GBR; NC	SWE	RSM				0	-	0
1984	500cc	Honda Britain	NS500	RSA	NAT; 4	ESP	AUT	GER	FRA	YUG	NED; 5	BEL; 7	GBR; 6	SWE; 3	RSM				33	7th	0
1985	500cc	Honda Britain	NS500	RSA; 3	ESP; 4	GER; 6	NAT; 3	AUT; 15	YUG; 3	NED; 3	BEL; 4	FRA; NC	GBR; NC	SWE; NC	RSM; 2				73	4th	0
1986	500cc	Rothmans Honda-HRC	NSR500	ESP; 1	NAT; 16	GER; 2	AUT; 2	YUG; 3	NED; 1	BEL; 4	FRA; 5	**GBR**; 1	**SWE**; 2	RSM; 2					117	2nd	3
1987	500cc	Rothmans Honda-HRC	NSR500	JPN; 2	ESP; 1	**GER**; 10	**NAT**; 1	**AUT**; 1	**YUG**; 1	**NED**; 2	FRA; 4	**GBR**; 2	**SWE**; 1	**CZE**; 1	RSM; 3	POR; 4	**BRA**; 1	**ARG**; 3	178	1st	7
1988	500cc	Rothmans Honda-HRC	NSR500	JPN; 2	USA; 2	ESP; 3	EXP; 5	**NAT**; 2	**GER**; 8	AUT; NC	NED; 1	BEL; 1	YUG; 1	FRA; 4	**GBR**; 2	SWE; 2	**CZE**; 1	**BRA**; 2	229	2nd	4
1989	500cc	Rothmans Honda-HRC	NSR500	JPN; 4	AUS; 1	USA; NC	ESP; INJ	NAT; INJ	GER; INJ	AUT; INJ	YUG; INJ	NED; 6	BEL; NC	FRA; NC	GBR; NC	SWE; 3	CZE	BRA; 7	67	10th	1
1990	500cc	Rothmans Honda-HRC	NSR500	JPN; 2	**USA**; NC	ESP; 1	NAT; 4	GER; INJ	AUT; INJ	YUG; INJ	NED; NC	BEL; 10	FRA; 2	**GBR**; NC	SWE; 3	CZE; 2	HUN; 4	AUS; 1	138	5th	2
1991	500cc	Rothmans Honda-HRC	NSR500	JPN; 5	AUS; 4	USA; 7	ESP; 7	ITA	GER; 5	AUT; 4	EUR; 3	NED; 3	FRA; 10	GBR; 5	RSM; 4	CZE; 4	VDM; 5	MAL; 2	161	5th	0
1992	500cc	Rothmans Honda-HRC	NSR500	JPN; NC	AUS	MAL	ESP	ITA; DNS	EUR	GER; 3	NED	HUN; 6	FRA; 2	GBR; 1	BRA; 4	RSA; 2			78	6th	1

=== Suzuka 8 Hours results ===
Year	Team	Co-Rider	Bike	Pos
1985	(Japan) Team HRC	(Australia) Wayne Gardner (Japan) Masaki Tokuno	Honda RVF750 RC45	**1st**
1986	(Japan) Team HRC	(Australia) Wayne Gardner (France) Dominique Sarron	Honda RVF750 RC45	**1st**
1991	(Japan) Oki Honda Racing Team	(Australia) Wayne Gardner (Australia) Mick Doohan	Honda RVF750 RC45	**1st**
1992	(Japan) Oki Honda Racing Team	(Australia) Wayne Gardner (Australia) Daryl Beattie	Honda RVF750 RC45	**1st**

== Car racing results ==
In part sourced from

Wayne Gardner
- Nationality: Australian
- Born: 11 October 1959 (age 67) Wollongong, NSW, Australia
- Retired: 2002

Supercars Championship
- Years active: 1993-2002
- Teams: Wayne Gardner Racing
- Starts: 0
- Wins: 0
- Podiums: 0
- Poles: 0
- Best finish: 7th in 1996 V8 Supercar Championship

Year	Title/ event	Position	Car	Entrant
1993	Australian Touring Car Championship	14th	Holden VP Commodore	Holden Racing Team
1994	Australian Touring Car Championship	12th	Holden VP Commodore	Wayne Gardner Racing
1995	Australian Touring Car Championship	9th	Holden VR Commodore	Wayne Gardner Racing
1996	Australian Touring Car Championship	7th	Holden VR Commodore	Wayne Gardner Racing
1996	All Japan Grand Touring Car Championship: GT500	10th	Toyota Supra	Toyota Team SARD
1997	Australian Touring Car Championship	9th	Holden VS Commodore	Wayne Gardner Racing
1997	All Japan Grand Touring Car Championship: GT500	20th	Toyota Supra	Power Craft
1998	All Japan Grand Touring Car Championship: GT500	17th	Toyota Supra	Team Power Craft
1999	All Japan Grand Touring Car Championship: GT500	12th	Toyota Supra	Toyota Team LeMans
1999	Shell Championship Series	40th	Holden VT Commodore	Wayne Gardner Racing
2000	All Japan Grand Touring Car Championship: GT500	9th	Toyota Supra	Toyota Team LeMans
2001	All Japan Grand Touring Car Championship: GT500	6th	Toyota Supra	Toyota Team TOM'S
2001	Shell Championship Series	53rd	Ford AU Falcon	Larkham Motor Sport
2002	All Japan Grand Touring Car Championship: GT500	7th	Toyota Supra	Toyota Team TOM'S
2002	V8 Supercar Championship Series	49th	Ford AU Falcon	Stone Brothers Racing

=== Complete Deutsche Tourenwagen Meisterschaft results ===
(key) (Races in bold indicate pole position) (Races in italics indicate fastest lap)

Year	Team	Car	1	2	3	4	5	6	7	8	9	10	11	12	13	14	15	16	17	18	19	20	21	22	23	24	Pos.	Pts
1992	Linder Rennsport	BMW M3 Sport Evolution	ZOL; 1	ZOL; 2	NÜR; 1	NÜR; 2	WUN; 1	WUN; 2	AVU; 1	AVU; 2	HOC; 1	HOC; 2	NÜR; 1	NÜR; 2	NOR; 1	NOR; 2	BRN; 1	BRN; 2	DIE; 1	DIE; 2	ALE; 1	ALE; 2	NÜR; 1; 14	NÜR; 2 Ret	HOC; 1; 16	HOC; 2 Ret	NC	0

=== Complete Bathurst 1000 results ===
Year	Team	Co-drivers	Car	Class	Laps	Pos.	Class pos.
1992	(Australia) Strathfield Car Radios	(Australia) Graham Moore	Holden VN Commodore SS Group A SV	A	119	26th	21st
1993	(Australia) Holden Racing Team	(Australia) Brad Jones	Holden VP Commodore	A	160	**3rd**	**3rd**
1994	(Australia) Coca-Cola Racing	(Australia) Neil Crompton	Holden VP Commodore	A	99	DNF	DNF
1995	(Australia) Coca-Cola Racing	(Australia) Neil Crompton	Holden VR Commodore		161	**3rd**	**3rd**
1996	(Australia) Coca-Cola Racing	(Australia) Neil Crompton	Holden VR Commodore		160	4th	4th
1997	(Australia) Wayne Gardner Racing	(Australia) Neil Crompton	Holden VS Commodore	L1	89	DNF	DNF
1998	(Australia) Wayne Gardner Racing	(Australia) Paul Stokell	Holden VS Commodore	OC	149	13th	12th
1999	(Australia) Wayne Gardner Racing	(Australia) David Brabham	Holden VT Commodore		157	14th	14th
2000	(Australia) Ford Tickford Racing	(Australia) Neal Bates	Ford AU Falcon		45	DNF	DNF
2001	(Australia) Larkham Motor Sport	(Australia) Mark Larkham	Ford AU Falcon		106	DNF	DNF
2002	(Australia) Stone Brothers Racing	(Australia) David Besnard	Ford AU Falcon		-	DNS	DNS

=== Complete Bathurst 12 Hour results ===
Year	Team	Co-drivers	Car	Class	Laps	Pos.	Class pos.
1993	(Australia) Palmer Tube Mills	(Australia) Ian Palmer (Australia) Ross Palmer	Honda NSX	C	253	**3rd**	**1st**

=== Complete Japanese GT Championship results ===
(key) (Races in bold indicate pole position) (Races in italics indicate fastest lap)

Year	Team	Car	Class	1	2	3	4	5	6	7	8	DC	Pts
1996	Toyota Team SARD	Toyota Supra	GT500	SUZ; 17	FUJ; 3	SEN; 4	FUJ; 9	SUG	MIN; 8			10th	27
1997	Power Craft	Toyota Supra	GT500	SUZ	FUJ	SEN; 7	FUJ; 15	MIN	SUG; 6			20th	10
1998	Team Power Craft	Toyota Supra	GT500	SUZ; 8	FUJ; C	SEN; 10	FUJ; 12	MOT	MIN; Ret	SUG; 7		17th	8
1999	Esso Ultron Toyota Team LeMans	Toyota Supra	GT500	SUZ	FUJ; 8	**SUG**; 16	MIN; 5	FUJ; 1	TAI; 9	MOT; 13		12th	33
2000	Esso Ultron Toyota Team LeMans	Toyota Supra	GT500	MOT; 8	FUJ; 4	SUG; 7	FUJ; 15	TAI; 7	MIN; 5	SUZ; 6		9th	35
2001	TOM'S Racing Team	Toyota Supra	GT500	TAI; 5	FUJ; 9	SUG; 1	FUJ; 10	MOT; 8	SUZ; 4	MIN; 9		6th	46
2002	TOM'S Racing Team	Toyota Supra	GT500	TAI; 8	FUJ; 14	SUG; 10	SEP; 2	FUJ; 5	MOT; 6	MIN; 3	SUZ; 9	7th	52

=== Complete 24 Hours of Le Mans results ===
Year	Team	Co-drivers	Car	Class	Laps	Pos.	Class pos.
1998	(France) Solution F	(France) Philippe Gache (Belgium) Didier de Radiguès	Riley & Scott Mk III Ford	LMP1	155	DNF	DNF

== Bibliography ==
- Hartgerink, Nick (1987). The Wayne Gardner Story. Lester-Townsend Publishing. ISBN 978-0949054692.
- Hartgerink, Nick (1989). Gardner: A Dream Come True. Milsons Point, N.S.W.: Hutchinson. ISBN 978-0091695804.
- Flack, Darryl (30 August 2023). The Immortals of Australian Motorcycle Racing: The World Champs (Part of the 7-volume comprehensive sports collection). Immortals of Australian Sport (7-book series). Gelding Street Press. ISBN 978-0-6452070-5-7.
