= 1989 Swedish motorcycle Grand Prix =

Motorcycle race championship

(Sweden) 1989 Swedish Grand Prix
Race details
- Race 13 of 15 races in the 1989 Grand Prix motorcycle racing season
- Date: 13 August 1989
- Official name: Swedish TT
- Location: Scandinavian Raceway
- Course: Permanent racing facility; 4.025 km (2.501 mi)

500cc
Pole position
- Rider: (United States) Wayne Rainey
- Time: 1:32.490
Fastest lap
- Rider: (France) Christian Sarron
- Time: 1:31.990
Podium
- First: (United States) Eddie Lawson
- Second: (France) Christian Sarron
- Third: (Australia) Wayne Gardner

250cc
Pole position
- Rider: (Spain) Carlos Cardús
- Time: 1:36.740
Fastest lap
- Rider: (Spain) Sito Pons
- Time: 1:36.360
Podium
- First: (Spain) Sito Pons
- Second: (West Germany) Reinhold Roth
- Third: (Switzerland) Jacques Cornu

125cc
Pole position
- Rider: (Spain) Àlex Crivillé
- Time: 1:43.610
Fastest lap
- Rider: (Spain) Àlex Crivillé
- Time: 1:42.770
Podium
- First: (Spain) Àlex Crivillé
- Second: (Netherlands) Hans Spaan
- Third: (Japan) Koji Takada

The 1989 Swedish motorcycle Grand Prix was the thirteenth round of the 1989 Grand Prix motorcycle racing season. It took place on the weekend of 11–13 August 1989 at the Anderstorp circuit.

== 500 cc race report ==
Wayne Rainey takes pole, then it's Kevin Schwantz and Eddie Lawson. Rainey gets the start, and Lawson moves into second, followed by Schwantz.

A lead group forms, with Rainey, a small gap to Lawson, then another small gap to Schwantz, Kevin Magee and Christian Sarron.

Schwantz cruises into the pits with a mechanical, and Lawson closes the gap to Rainey and moves into the lead. Sarron is in third a couple of bike lengths behind, and Wayne Gardner passes Magee for fourth spot.

With two laps to go, Rainey is right behind Lawson and highsides on the exit of a right-hander. It's a long tumble, but he gets up and doesn't try to pick up the bike. Though it's Rainey's only real mistake all year, Lawson's consistency and improvement brings him the win and a lead in the standings by 13.5 points. Sarron takes second, Gardner third.

Says Lawson of the lap that saw Rainey go down: "That was my fastest lap of the race; I'd never got on the throttle that early all race. When I cracked it open, Wayne followed me, and there was no way the Dunlop was going to do that. It wasn’t Wayne, it was the tyres."

== 500 cc classification ==
Pos.	Rider	Team	Manufacturer	Laps	Time/Retired	Points
1	(United States) Eddie Lawson	Rothmans Kanemoto Honda	Honda	30	46:31.950	20
2	(France) Christian Sarron	Sonauto Gauloises Blondes Yamaha Mobil 1	Yamaha	30	+5.650	17
3	(Australia) Wayne Gardner	Rothmans Honda Team	Honda	30	+25.030	15
4	(United Kingdom) Niall Mackenzie	Marlboro Yamaha Team Agostini	Yamaha	30	+31.630	13
5	(Australia) Kevin Magee	Team Lucky Strike Roberts	Yamaha	30	+51.550	11
6	(United Kingdom) Ron Haslam	Suzuki Pepsi Cola	Suzuki	30	+55.450	10
7	(Italy) Pierfrancesco Chili	HB Honda Gallina Team	Honda	30	+55.660	9
8	(France) Adrien Morillas	Team ROC Elf Honda	Honda	30	+55.840	8
9	(United Kingdom) Rob McElnea	Cabin Racing Team	Honda	30	+1:33.500	7
10	(Japan) Tadahiko Taira	Yamaha Motor Company	Yamaha	29	+1 Lap	6
11	(Italy) Alessandro Valesi	Team Iberia	Yamaha	29	+1 Lap	5
12	(United Kingdom) Simon Buckmaster	Racing Team Katayama	Honda	29	+1 Lap	4
13	(Italy) Fabio Biliotti	Racing Team Katayama	Honda	28	+2 Laps	3
14	(Switzerland) Bruno Kneubühler	Romer Racing Suisse	Honda	28	+2 Laps	2
15	(Spain) Juan Lopez Mella	Club Motocross Pozuelo	Honda	28	+2 Laps	1
16	(Switzerland) Nicholas Schmassman	FMS	Honda	28	+2 Laps	
17	(Finland) Timo Paavilainen		Suzuki	28	+2 Laps	
Ret	(Norway) Torbjorn Bastiansen		Suzuki		Retirement	
Ret	(Luxembourg) Andreas Leuthe	Librenti Corse	Suzuki		Retirement	
Ret	(United States) Wayne Rainey	Team Lucky Strike Roberts	Yamaha		Retirement	
Ret	(United Kingdom) Alan Carter		Honda		Retirement	
Ret	(United States) Kevin Schwantz	Suzuki Pepsi Cola	Suzuki		Retirement	
Ret	(France) Rachel Nicotte		Chevallier Yamaha		Retirement	
Ret	(Sweden) Peter Linden	Team Heukeroff	Honda		Retirement	
DNS	(Switzerland) Marco Gentile	Fior Marlboro	Fior		Did not start	
DNS	(Austria) Josef Doppler		Honda		Did not start	
DNS	(Italy) Luca Cadalora	Marlboro Yamaha Team Agostini	Yamaha		Did not start	
DNQ	(Spain) Francisco Gonzales	Club Motocross Pozuelo	Honda		Did not qualify	
DNQ	(United Kingdom) Ian Pratt		Suzuki		Did not qualify	
DNQ	(Sweden) Aki Dahli		Honda		Did not qualify	

Previous race: 1989 British Grand Prix	FIM Grand Prix World Championship; 1989 season	Next race: 1989 Czechoslovak Grand Prix
Previous race: 1988 Swedish Grand Prix	Swedish Grand Prix	Next race: 1990 Swedish Grand Prix
