= 1989 British motorcycle Grand Prix =

(United Kingdom) 1989 British Grand Prix
Race details
- Race 12 of 15 races in the 1989 Grand Prix motorcycle racing season
- Date: 6 August 1989
- Official name: Shell British Motorcycle Grand Prix
- Location: Donington
- Course: Permanent racing facility; 4.023 km (2.500 mi)

500cc
Pole position
- Rider: (United States) Kevin Schwantz
- Time: 1:34.050
Fastest lap
- Rider: (United States) Eddie Lawson
- Time: 1:34.510
Podium
- First: (United States) Kevin Schwantz
- Second: (United States) Eddie Lawson
- Third: (United States) Wayne Rainey

250cc
Pole position
- Rider: (Italy) Luca Cadalora
- Time: 1:38.310
Fastest lap
- Rider: (Spain) Sito Pons
- Time: 1:38.330
Podium
- First: (Spain) Sito Pons
- Second: (West Germany) Reinhold Roth
- Third: (Japan) Masahiro Shimizu

125cc
Pole position
- Rider: (Netherlands) Hans Spaan
- Time: 1:43.750
Fastest lap
- Rider: (Netherlands) Hans Spaan
- Time: 1:44.670
Podium
- First: (Netherlands) Hans Spaan
- Second: (Spain) Àlex Crivillé
- Third: (Italy) Ezio Gianola

The 1989 British motorcycle Grand Prix was the twelfth round of the 1989 Grand Prix motorcycle racing season. It took place on the weekend of 4–6 August 1989 at Donington Park.

== 500 cc race report ==
Luca Cadalora is brought in to replace Freddie Spencer, who's been released by team manager Giacomo Agostini.

In the first lap Wayne Rainey’s in front of a group of 4 riders, with Kevin Schwantz, Christian Sarron and Eddie Lawson. Rainey and Schwantz trade the lead, while Niall Mackenzie comes up from behind. Mackenzie is having a good day, as he passes Lawson and Rainey to move into second behind Schwantz. Mackenzie takes the lead for half a lap, but Schwantz gets it back at the chicane, and soon Lawson passes him as well. Wayne Gardner retires with a mechanical.

Rainey passes Mackenzie, but Schwantz and Lawson have gotten far ahead. Schwantz takes the win from Lawson by a few bike lengths, and Rainey comes in third. With 3 rounds to go, Lawson is less than 7 points away from Rainey with 60 points still to be decided.

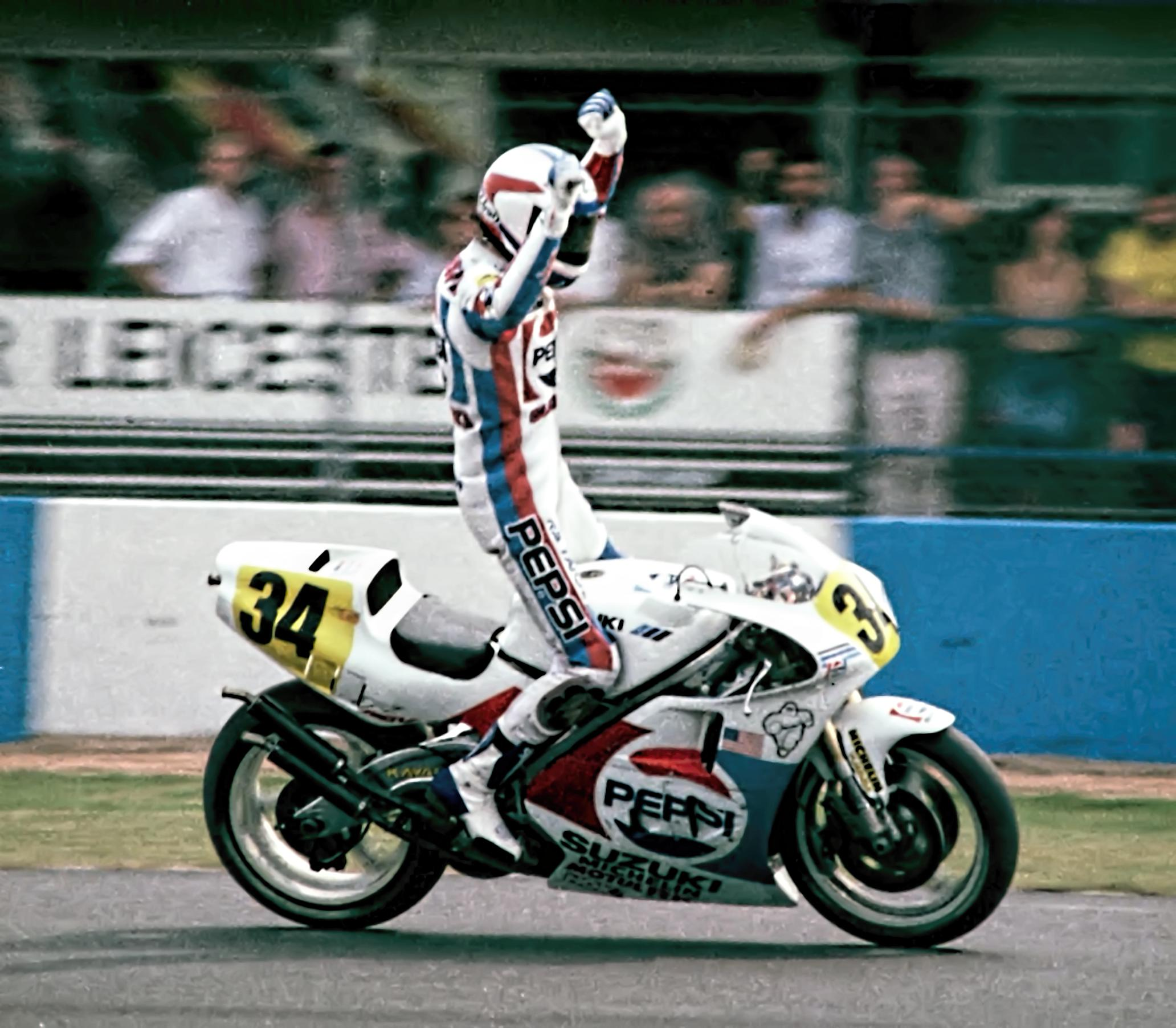
Race winner Kevin Schwantz, celebrating after winning the 500cc race.

== 500 cc classification ==
Pos.	Rider	Team	Manufacturer	Laps	Time/Retired	Grid	Points
1	(United States) Kevin Schwantz	Suzuki Pepsi Cola	Suzuki	30	47:45.670	1	20
2	(United States) Eddie Lawson	Rothmans Kanemoto Honda	Honda	30	+0.970	2	17
3	(United States) Wayne Rainey	Team Lucky Strike Roberts	Yamaha	30	+8.600	3	15
4	(United Kingdom) Niall Mackenzie	Marlboro Yamaha Team Agostini	Yamaha	30	+10.940	6	13
5	(France) Christian Sarron	Sonauto Gauloises Blondes Yamaha Mobil 1	Yamaha	30	+28.310	4	11
6	(Australia) Kevin Magee	Team Lucky Strike Roberts	Yamaha	30	+38.490	8	10
7	(United Kingdom) Ron Haslam	Suzuki Pepsi Cola	Suzuki	30	+47.360	9	9
8	(Italy) Luca Cadalora	Marlboro Yamaha Team Agostini	Yamaha	30	+51.770	5	8
9	(Italy) Pierfrancesco Chili	HB Honda Gallina Team	Honda	30	+1:27.710	7	7
10	(United Kingdom) Rob McElnea	Cabin Racing Team	Honda	29	+1 Lap	11	6
11	(United States) Fred Merkel	HB Honda Gallina Team	Honda	29	+1 Lap	14	5
12	(United Kingdom) Roger Burnett	Rothmans Honda Team	Honda	29	+1 Lap	13	4
13	(Switzerland) Marco Gentile	Fior Marlboro	Fior	29	+1 Lap	15	3
14	(Italy) Fabio Biliotti	Racing Team Katayama	Honda	29	+1 Lap	20	2
15	(United Kingdom) Simon Buckmaster	Racing Team Katayama	Honda	29	+1 Lap	17	1
16	(Italy) Marco Papa	Team Greco	Paton	28	+2 Laps	23	
17	(New Zealand) Robert Holden		Honda	28	+2 Laps	26	
18	(Switzerland) Bruno Kneubühler	Romer Racing Suisse	Honda	28	+2 Laps	27	
19	(France) Claude Albert		Suzuki	28	+2 Laps	22	
20	(Luxembourg) Andreas Leuthe	Librenti Corse	Suzuki	28	+2 Laps	30	
21	(Austria) Josef Doppler		Honda	28	+2 Laps	29	
22	(Spain) Francisco Gonzales	Club Motocross Pozuelo	Honda	28	+2 Laps	31	
23	(United Kingdom) Peter Graves		Honda	28	+2 Laps	36	
Ret	(United Kingdom) Ian Pratt	Racing Team Katayama	Suzuki		Retirement	33	
Ret	(Australia) Wayne Gardner	Rothmans Honda Team	Honda		Retirement	10	
Ret	(United Kingdom) Mark Phillips		Suzuki		Retirement	32	
Ret	(France) Dominique Sarron	Team ROC Elf Honda	Honda		Retirement	12	
Ret	(Switzerland) Nicholas Schmassman	FMS	Honda		Retirement	25	
Ret	(France) Rachel Nicotte		Chevallier Yamaha		Retirement	16	
Ret	(Spain) Juan Lopez Mella	Club Motocross Pozuelo	Honda		Retirement	24	
Ret	(Netherlands) Cees Doorakkers	HRK Motors	Honda		Retirement	19	
Ret	(United Kingdom) John Mossey		Suzuki		Retirement	34	
Ret	(United Kingdom) David Crampton		Suzuki		Retirement	35	
Ret	(Italy) Alessandro Valesi	Team Iberia	Yamaha		Retirement	21	
Ret	(United Kingdom) Alan Carter		Honda		Retirement	18	
DNS	(United Kingdom) Andy McGladdery		Honda		Did not start	28	
DNQ	(Venezuela) Larry Moreno Vacondio		Honda		Did not qualify		
DNQ	(Republic of Ireland) Eddie Laycock		Honda		Did not qualify		

Previous race: 1989 French Grand Prix	FIM Grand Prix World Championship; 1989 season	Next race: 1989 Swedish Grand Prix
Previous race: 1988 British Grand Prix	British Grand Prix	Next race: 1990 British Grand Prix
