= 1978 Venezuelan motorcycle Grand Prix =

(Venezuela) 1978 Venezuelan Grand Prix
Race details
- Race 1 of 13 races in the 1978 Grand Prix motorcycle racing season
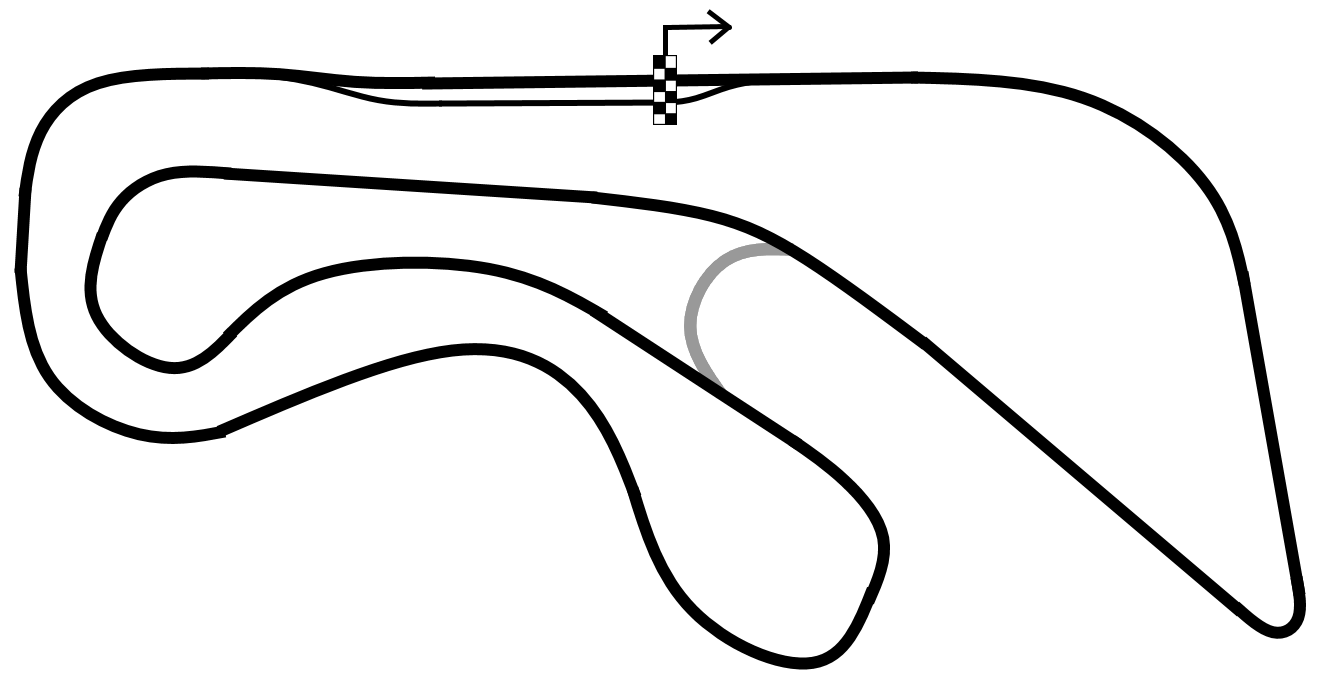
- Date: 19 March 1978
- Official name: II Grand Prix de Venezuela
- Location: Autodromo Internacional de San Carlos
- Course: Permanent racing facility; 4.135 km (2.569 mi)

500cc
Pole position
- Rider: (Venezuela) Johnny Cecotto
- Time: 1:35.300
Fastest lap
- Rider: (United Kingdom) Barry Sheene
- Time: 1:35.400
Podium
- First: (United Kingdom) Barry Sheene
- Second: (United States) Pat Hennen
- Third: (United States) Steve Baker

350cc
Pole position
- Rider: (Italy) Franco Uncini
- Time: 1:38.200
Fastest lap
- Rider: (Italy) Franco Uncini
- Time: 1:36.600
Podium
- First: (Japan) Takazumi Katayama
- Second: (France) Patrick Fernandez
- Third: (Italy) Paolo Pileri

250cc
Pole position
- Rider: (Italy) Franco Uncini
- Time: 1:39.400
Fastest lap
- Rider: (United States) Kenny Roberts
- Time: 1:38.500
Podium
- First: (United States) Kenny Roberts
- Second: (Venezuela) Carlos Lavado
- Third: (France) Patrick Fernandez

125cc
Pole position
- Rider: (Italy) Pierpaolo Bianchi
- Time: 1:44.900
Fastest lap
- Rider: (Italy) Pierpaolo Bianchi
- Time: 1:44.800
Podium
- First: (Italy) Pierpaolo Bianchi
- Second: (Italy) Eugenio Lazzarini
- Third: (Venezuela) Víctor León-Pacheco

The 1978 Venezuelan motorcycle Grand Prix was the first round of the 1978 Grand Prix motorcycle racing season. It took place on 19 March 1978 at the San Carlos Circuit.

== 500cc classification ==
Pos.	Rider	Team	Manufacturer	Time/Retired	Points
1	(United Kingdom) Barry Sheene	Texaco Heron Team Suzuki	Suzuki	48'21.300	15
2	(United States) Pat Hennen		Suzuki	+21.700	12
3	(United States) Steve Baker	Team Gallina Nava Olio Fiat	Suzuki	+57.300	10
4	(United Kingdom) Steve Parrish		Suzuki	+1 lap	8
5	(Venezuela) Roberto Pietri		Yamaha	+2 laps	6
6	(West Germany) Gerhard Vogt	Bill Smith Racing	Yamaha	+3 laps	5
7	(Italy) Leandro Becheroni		Suzuki	+6 laps	4
	(Venezuela) Johnny Cecotto	Yamaha Motor Company	Yamaha	Tyre problems	
	(United States) Kenny Roberts	Yamaha Motor Company	Yamaha	Retired	
	(Japan) Takazumi Katayama	Sarome & Motul Team	Yamaha	Accident	
	(Italy) Virginio Ferrari	Team Gallina Nava Olio Fiat	Suzuki	Retired	

== 350 cc classification ==
Pos	Rider	Manufacturer	Laps	Time	Grid	Points
1	(Japan) Takazumi Katayama	Yamaha	29	48:05.5	5	15
2	(France) Patrick Fernandez	Yamaha	29	+29.7	3	12
3	(Italy) Paolo Pileri	Morbidelli	29	+41.9	17	10
4	(South Africa) Kork Ballington	Kawasaki	29	+43.4	7	8
5	(France) Patrick Pons	Yamaha	29	+50.2	4	6
6	(France) Christian Sarron	Yamaha	29	+58.4	11	5
7	(France) Eric Saul	Yamaha	29	+1:06.4	15	4
8	(Italy) Franco Bonera	Yamaha	29	+1:14.7	9	3
9	(Venezuela) Eduardo Alemán	Yamaha	29	+1:28.0	20	2
10	(Venezuela) Antonio Piccioni	Yamaha	29	+1:33.1	10	1
11	(Italy) Franco Solaroli	Yamaha	28	+1 lap	16	
12	(United Kingdom) Barry Woodland	Yamaha	28	+1 lap		
13	(Costa Rica) C. Cortes	Harley-Davidson	28	+1 lap		
14	(United States) Kent Rockwell	Yamaha	27	+2 laps		
	(Italy) Franco Uncini	Yamaha			1	
	(Australia) Gregg Hansford	Kawasaki			2	
	(France) Olivier Chevallier	Yamaha			6	
	(Italy) Vinicio Salmi	Yamaha			8	
	(Venezuela) Jose Cecotto	Yamaha			12	
	(United Kingdom) Tom Herron	Yamaha			13	
	(United Kingdom) Mick Grant	Kawasaki			14	
	(Italy) Felice Agostini	Yamaha			18	
	(Venezuela) "Dallefusine"	Yamaha			19	
30 starters in total

== 250 cc classification ==
Pos	Rider	Manufacturer	Laps	Time	Grid	Points
1	(United States) Kenny Roberts	Yamaha	28	47:15.6	2	15
2	(Venezuela) Carlos Lavado	Yamaha	28	+14.8	3	12
3	(France) Patrick Fernandez	Yamaha	28	+37.3	5	10
4	(France) Olivier Chevallier	Yamaha	28	+43.1	8	8
5	(South Africa) Kork Ballington	Kawasaki	28	+43.1	6	6
6	(Italy) Mario Lega	Morbidelli	28	+54.9	9	5
7	(West Germany) Anton Mang	Kawasaki	28	+1:04.2	11	4
8	(United States) Ted Henter	Yamaha	28	+1:35.5	12	3
9	(Venezuela) Eduardo Alemán	Yamaha	27	+1 lap	15	2
10	(Australia) Vic Soussan	Yamaha	27	+1 lap	17	1
11	(United Kingdom) Tom Herron	Yamaha	27	+1 lap	19	
12	(Italy) Edoardo Elias	Yamaha	27	+1 lap	20	
13	(Spain) Ángel Nieto	Yamaha	27	+1 lap		
14	(Spain) Fernando González	Yamaha	27	+1 lap	18	
15	(Italy) Vinicio Salmi	Yamaha	27	+1 lap		
16	(United States) Kent Rockwell	Yamaha	26	+2 laps	13	
17	(Spain) Carlos Morante	Yamaha	26	+2 laps		
18	(Venezuela) P. Betancourt	Yamaha	26	+2 laps		
19	(Spain) F. Perez	Yamaha	26	+2 laps		
20	(Italy) "Prusso"	Yamaha	26	+2 laps		
21	(Mexico) G. Martinez	Yamaha	26	+2 laps		
	(Italy) Franco Uncini	Yamaha			1	
	(Australia) Gregg Hansford	Kawasaki			4	
	(Italy) Paolo Pileri	Morbidelli			7	
	(United Kingdom) Mick Grant	Kawasaki			10	
	(France) Eric Saul	Yamaha			14	
	(United Kingdom) Barry Woodland	Yamaha			16	
26 starters in total

== 125 cc classification ==
Pos	Rider	Manufacturer	Laps	Time	Grid	Points
1	(Italy) Pierpaolo Bianchi	Minarelli	26	46:05.5	1	15
2	(Italy) Eugenio Lazzarini	MBA	26	+54.0	3	12
3	(Venezuela) V. T. Leon	Morbidelli	26	+1:20.6	7	10
4	(Venezuela) Alejandro Alemán	Yamaha	26	+1:21.8	11	8
5	(Italy) Riccardo Russo	Morbidelli	24	+2 laps	14	6
6	(Italy) Claudio Granata	Morbidelli	24	+2 laps	15	5
7	(Italy) Luigi Schiavione	Morbidelli	21	+5 laps	16	4
	(Spain) Ángel Nieto	Bultaco			2	
	(Venezuela) Ivan Palazzese	Morbidelli			4	
	(Italy) Maurizio Massimiani	Morbidelli			5	
	(Italy) Claudio Lusuardi	Morbidelli			6	
	"Troisi"	Morbidelli			8	
	(France) Thierry Espié	Motobécane			9	
	(Italy) Guido Mancini	Morbidelli			10	
	(Italy) Germano Zanetti	Morbidelli			12	
	(Venezuela) R. Olavarria	Morbidelli			13	
	(Italy) Felice Agostini	Morbidelli			17	
	(Uruguay) "Moreira"	Yamaha			18	
	(United States) Keith Gonyou	Yamaha			19	
	(Canada) "Bernard"	Yamaha			20	
23 starters in total

Previous race: 1977 British Grand Prix	FIM Grand Prix World Championship; 1978 season	Next race: 1978 Spanish Grand Prix
Previous race: 1977 Venezuelan Grand Prix	Venezuelan Grand Prix	Next race: 1979 Venezuelan Grand Prix
