= 1979 Venezuelan motorcycle Grand Prix =

(Venezuela) 1979 Venezuelan Grand Prix
Race details
- Race 1 of 13 races in the 1979 Grand Prix motorcycle racing season
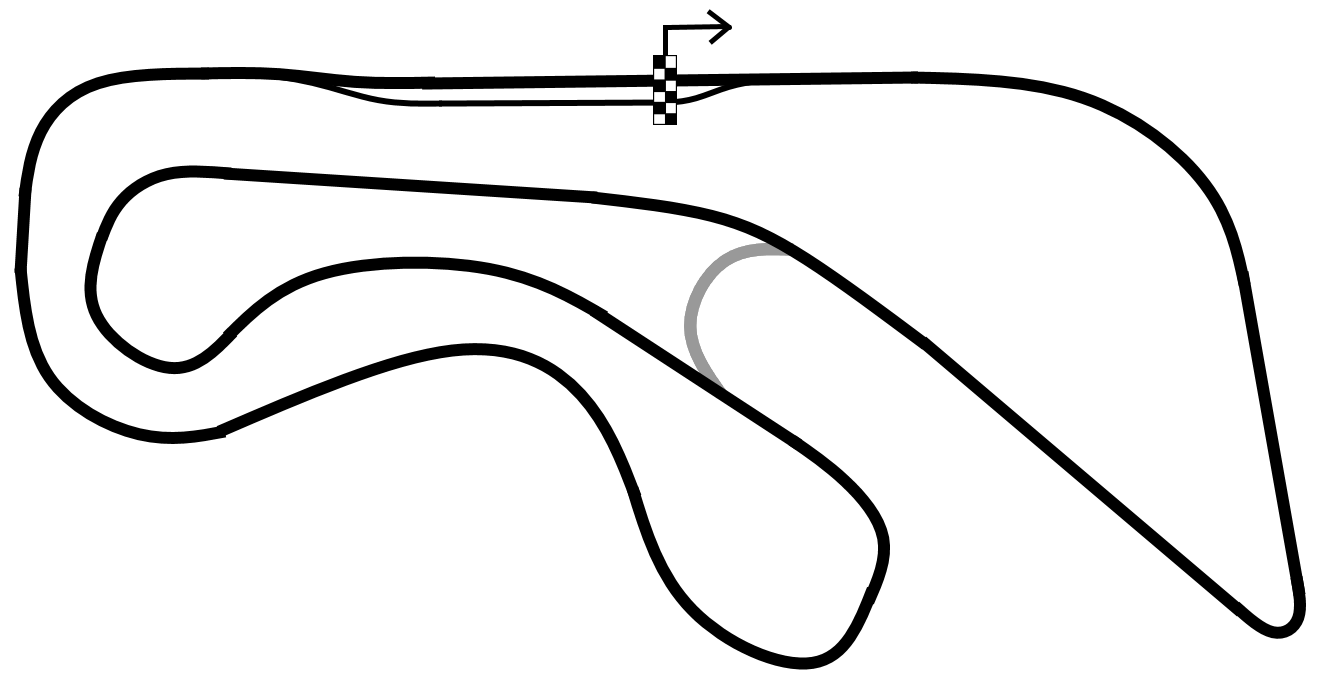
- Date: 18 March 1979
- Official name: Gran Premio de Venezuela
- Location: San Carlos Circuit
- Course: Permanent racing facility; 4.135 km (2.569 mi)

500cc
Pole position
- Rider: (United Kingdom) Barry Sheene
- Time: 1:34.140
Fastest lap
- Rider: (United Kingdom) Barry Sheene
- Time: 1:34.080
Podium
- First: (United Kingdom) Barry Sheene
- Second: (Italy) Virginio Ferrari
- Third: (United Kingdom) Tom Herron

350cc
Pole position
- Rider: (Venezuela) Carlos Lavado
- Time: 1:35.400
Fastest lap
- Rider: (Venezuela) Carlos Lavado
- Time: 1:34.490
Podium
- First: (Venezuela) Carlos Lavado
- Second: (Italy) Walter Villa
- Third: (France) Patrick Fernandez

250cc
Pole position
- Rider: (Venezuela) Carlos Lavado
- Time: 1:38.190
Fastest lap
- Rider: (Italy) Walter Villa
- Time: 1:37.550
Podium
- First: (Italy) Walter Villa
- Second: (South Africa) Kork Ballington
- Third: (Australia) Victor Soussan

125cc
Pole position
- Rider: (Venezuela) Iván Palazzese
- Time: 1:44.550
Fastest lap
- Rider: (Spain) Ángel Nieto
- Time: 1:43.480
Podium
- First: (Spain) Ángel Nieto
- Second: (France) Thierry Espié
- Third: (Italy) Maurizio Massimiani

50cc
Pole position
- Rider: No 50cc race was held
Fastest lap
- Rider: No 50cc race was held
Podium
- First: No 50cc race was held
- Second: No 50cc race was held
- Third: No 50cc race was held

The 1979 Venezuelan motorcycle Grand Prix, the first of 13 rounds of the F.I.M. 1979 Grand Prix motorcycle racing season, was held on 18 March at the San Carlos Circuit. British rider Barry Sheene, world champion in 1976 and 1977, won the 500cc GP by 18 seconds from Italian Virginio Ferrari to make it three successive Venezuelan GPs. Venezuelan racer Carlos Lavado won the 350cc class from Italian Walter Villa and Frenchman Patrick Fernandez.

Villa won the 250cc event, ahead of South African rider Kork Ballington by 20 seconds, marking the final Grand Prix victory of Villa's motorcycle racing career. Spanish rider Ángel Nieto won the 125cc class from Frenchman Thierry Espié and Italian Maurizio Massimiani. Nieto would later win the 125cc season championship. Yamaha won two races, and Suzuki and Minarelli one each.

== Classifications ==
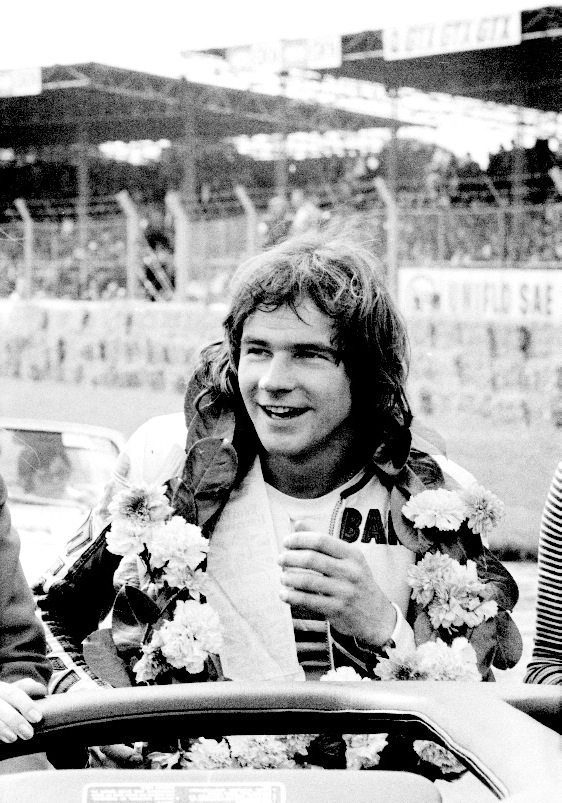
Barry Sheene, won the 500cc GP from Virginio Ferrari.

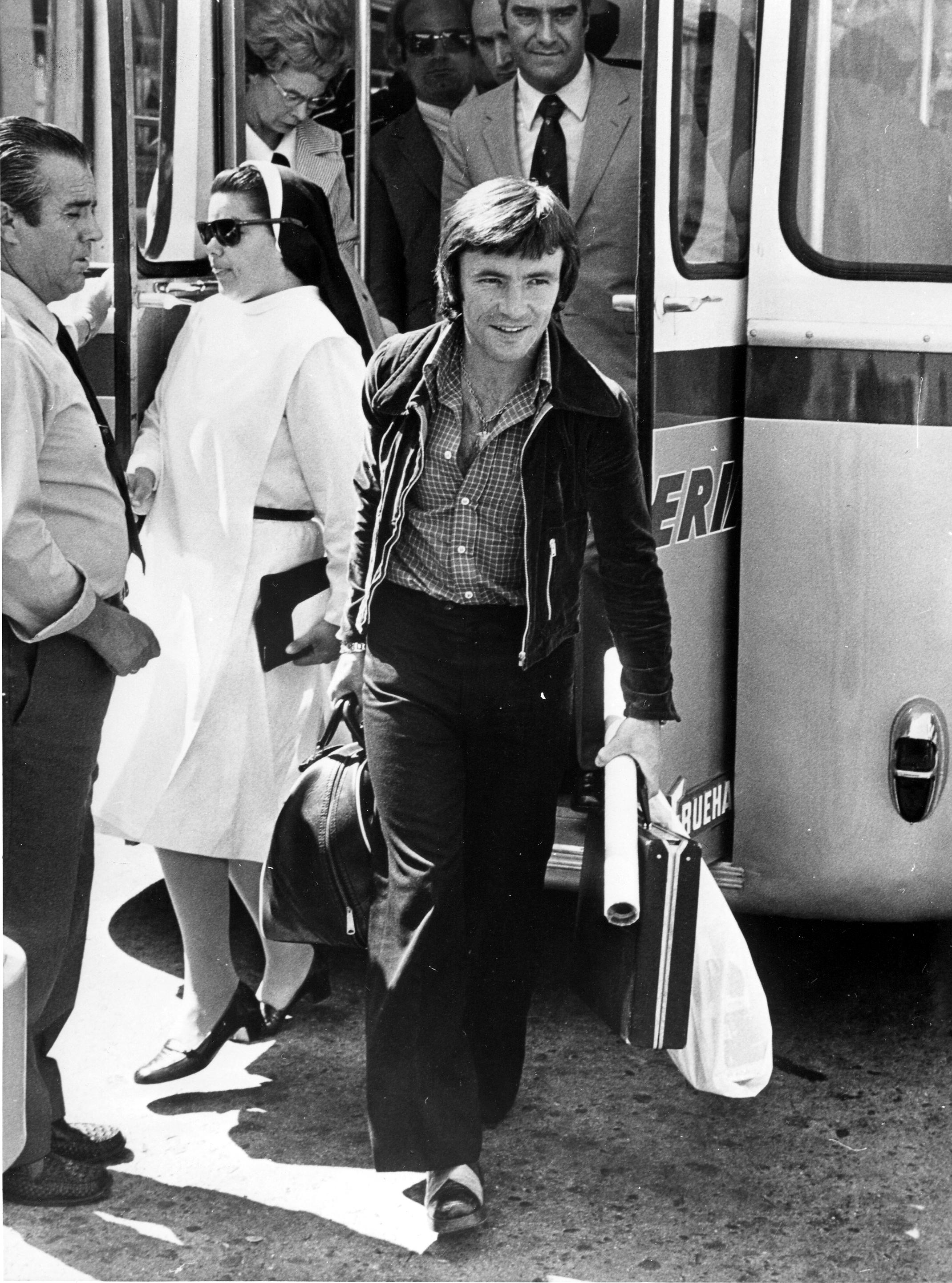
Spanish racer Ángel Nieto, 125cc winner.

=== 500 cc ===
Pos.	Rider	Team	Manufacturer	Laps	Time	Grid	Points
1	(United Kingdom) Barry Sheene	Texaco Heron Team Suzuki	Suzuki	30	47'52.900	1	15
2	(Italy) Virginio Ferrari	Team Gallina Nava Olio Fiat	Suzuki	30	+18.600	4	12
3	(United Kingdom) Tom Herron	Texaco Heron Team Suzuki	Suzuki	30	+30.900	2	10
4	(Italy) Franco Uncini	Team Zago International	Suzuki	30	+1'34.800	6	8
5	(France) Michel Rougerie		Suzuki	29	+1 lap	10	6
6	(Venezuela) Roberto Pietri		Suzuki	29	+1 lap	11	5
7	(France) Christian Sarron	Team Sonauto Gauloises	Yamaha	29	+1 lap	12	4
8	(West Germany) Gerhard Vogt	Bill Smith Racing	Suzuki	28	+2 laps	13	3
9	(Switzerland) Stefan Pellandini		Suzuki	27	+3 laps	15	2
10	(United Kingdom) Dennis Ireland	Derry's Racing	Suzuki	27	+3 laps	16	1
	(Venezuela) Johnny Cecotto	Yamaha Motor Company	Yamaha			3	
	(Netherlands) Wil Hartog	Riemersma Racing	Suzuki			5	
	(United Kingdom) Steve Parrish		Suzuki			7	
	(United Kingdom) Mick Grant		Suzuki			8	
	(Italy) Gianni Pelletier		Suzuki			9	
	(Spain) Carlos Delgado de San Antonio		Suzuki			14	

=== 350 cc ===
Pos	Rider	Manufacturer	Laps	Time	Grid	Points
1	(Venezuela) Carlos Lavado	Yamaha	29	46:48.4	1	15
2	(Italy) Walter Villa	Yamaha	29	+15.3	2	12
3	(France) Patrick Fernandez	Yamaha	29	+23.5	4	10
4	(South Africa) Kork Ballington	Kawasaki	29	+28.1	6	8
5	(South Africa) Jon Ekerold	Yamaha	29	+33.8	3	6
6	(France) Christian Estrosi	Kawasaki	29	+40.0	9	5
7	(France) Eric Saul	Yamaha	29	+1:11.9	11	4
8	(Australia) Victor Soussan	Yamaha	29	+1:22.4	8	3
9	(France) Olivier Chevallier	Yamaha	29	+1:25.6	12	2
10	(France) Patrick Pons	Yamaha	29	+1:35.7	7	1
11	(Venezuela) Eduardo Alemán	Yamaha	28	+1 lap	14	
12	(Australia) Gregg Hansford	Kawasaki	28	+1 lap	10	
13	(United States) Randy Mamola	Yamaha	28	+1 lap		
14	(United Kingdom) Barry Woodland	Yamaha	28	+1 lap		
15	(Venezuela) J. Gonzalez	Yamaha	27	+2 laps		
	(Venezuela) Iván Palazzese	Yamaha			5	
	(Brazil) C. Giroto	Yamaha			13	
	(Italy) Franco Uncini	Yamaha			15	
30 starters in total, 18 finishers

=== 250 cc ===
Pos	Rider	Manufacturer	Laps	Time	Grid	Points
1	(Italy) Walter Villa	Yamaha	28	46:13.5	2	15
2	(South Africa) Kork Ballington	Kawasaki	28	+20.6	3	12
3	(Australia) Victor Soussan	Yamaha	28	+1:14.2	9	10
4	(France) Olivier Chevallier	Yamaha	28	+1:17.6	7	8
5	(United States) Randy Mamola	Bimota	28	+1:21.5	13	6
6	(France) Eric Saul	Yamaha	28	+1:27.1	8	5
7	(Australia) Gregg Hansford	Kawasaki	28	+1:40.5	5	4
8	(Italy) Maurizio Massimiani	MBA	27	+1 lap	12	3
9	(United Kingdom) Chas Mortimer	Yamaha	27	+1 lap	11	2
10	(Spain) Fernando Gonzalez	Yamaha	27	+1 lap		1
11	(Spain) A. Rubio	Yamaha	27	+1 lap		
12	(Venezuela) I. Troisi	Yamaha	27	+1 lap		
13	(Cuba) B. Jull	Yamaha	27	+1 lap		
14	(Italy) G. Di Carlo	Yamaha	27	+1 lap		
15	(Spain) Carlos Morante	Yamaha	24	+4 laps		
16	(Venezuela) Eduardo Alemán	Yamaha	24	+4 laps	10	
	(Venezuela) Carlos Lavado	Yamaha			1	
	(France) Patrick Fernandez	Yamaha			4	
	(France) Christian Estrosi	Kawasaki			6	
	(Italy) Graziano Rossi	Morbidelli			14	
26 starters in total, ? finishers

=== 125 cc ===
Pos	Rider	Manufacturer	Laps	Time	Grid	Points
1	(Spain) Ángel Nieto	Minarelli	26	45:39.3	3	15
2	(France) Thierry Espié	Motobécane	26	+6.1	4	12
3	(Italy) Maurizio Massimiani	MBA	26	+40.6	6	10
4	(Monaco) Patrick Herouard	MBA	26	+58.5	7	8
5	(France) Jean Lecureux	Morbidelli	26	+1:12.9		6
6	(Venezuela) Ivan Troisi	Yamaha	26	+1:18.4	8	5
7	(France) Francois Granon	Morbidelli	26	+1:28.5	13	4
8	(Switzerland) Hans Müller	Morbidelli	26	+1:44.2	10	3
9	(France) Jean Paul Magnoni	Morbidelli	25	+1 lap	15	2
10	(France) Patrick Plisson	Motoshop	25	+1 lap	11	1
11	(Netherlands) Bernie Wilbers	MBA	25	+1 lap		
12	(Argentina) H. Vigneti	Morbidelli	25	+1 lap		
13	(Italy) Eduardo Cereda	MBA	25	+1 lap	12	
14	(Netherlands) J. Huberts	MBA	25	+1 lap		
15	(Dominican Republic) D. Abreu	Honda	23	+3 laps		
	(Venezuela) Ivan Palazzese	MBA			1	
	(Italy) Eugenio Lazzarini	MBA			2	
	(Sweden) Bam Carlson	Morbidelli			5	
	(Italy) Jean P. Marchetti	MBA			9	
	(Spain) Fernando Gonzalez	Morbidelli			14	
25 starters in total, 17 finishers

Previous race: 1978 Yugoslavian Grand Prix	FIM Grand Prix World Championship; 1979 season	Next race: 1979 Austrian Grand Prix
Previous race: 1978 Venezuelan Grand Prix	Venezuelan Grand Prix	Next race: None
