= 1978 Spanish motorcycle Grand Prix =

(Spain) 1978 Spanish Grand Prix
Race details
- Race 2 of 13 races in the 1978 Grand Prix motorcycle racing season
- Date: 16 April 1978
- Official name: XXVVIII Gran Premio de España
- Location: Circuito Permanente del Jarama
- Course: Permanent racing facility; 3.404 km (2.115 mi)

500cc
Pole position
- Rider: (United States) Kenny Roberts
- Time: 1:34.900
Fastest lap
- Rider: (United States) Kenny Roberts
- Time: 1:34.500
Podium
- First: (United States) Pat Hennen
- Second: (United States) Kenny Roberts
- Third: (Japan) Takazumi Katayama

250cc
Pole position
- Rider: (United States) Kenny Roberts
- Time: 1:38.700
Fastest lap
- Rider: (Australia) Gregg Hansford
- Time: 1:36.900
Podium
- First: (Australia) Gregg Hansford
- Second: (United States) Kenny Roberts
- Third: (Italy) Franco Uncini

125cc
Pole position
- Rider: (Italy) Pierpaolo Bianchi
- Time: 1:44.100
Fastest lap
- Rider: (Italy) Eugenio Lazzarini
- Time: 1:43.900
Podium
- First: (Italy) Eugenio Lazzarini
- Second: (France) Thierry Espié
- Third: (Austria) Harald Bartol

50cc
Pole position
- Rider: (Italy) Eugenio Lazzarini
- Time: 1:53.600
Fastest lap
- Rider: (Italy) Eugenio Lazzarini
- Time: 1:52.500
Podium
- First: (Italy) Eugenio Lazzarini
- Second: (Spain) Ricardo Tormo
- Third: (France) Patrick Plisson

The 1978 Spanish motorcycle Grand Prix was the second round of the 1978 Grand Prix motorcycle racing season. It took place on the weekend of 14–16 April 1978 at the Circuito Permanente del Jarama.

== Classification ==
=== 500 cc ===
Pos	No.	Rider	Team	Manufacturer	Time	Points
1	3	(United States) Pat Hennen		Suzuki	57'45.800	15
2	40	(United States) Kenny Roberts	Yamaha Motor Company	Yamaha	+7.300	12
3	24	(Japan) Takazumi Katayama	Sarome & Motul Team	Yamaha	+8.900	10
4	4	(Venezuela) Johnny Cecotto	Yamaha Motor Company	Yamaha	+14.300	8
5	7	(United Kingdom) Barry Sheene	Texaco Heron Team Suzuki	Suzuki	+14.700	6
6	2	(United States) Steve Baker	Team Gallina Nava Olio Fiat	Suzuki	+16.500	5
7	8	(Finland) Tepi Länsivuori		Suzuki	+1'01.500	4
8	15	(France) Christian Estrosi		Suzuki	+1'10.700	3
9	9	(Netherlands) Wil Hartog	Riemersma Racing	Suzuki	+1'14.900	2
10	5	(United Kingdom) Steve Parrish		Suzuki	+1 lap	1
11	14	(Netherlands) Boet van Dulmen		Suzuki	+1 lap	
12	21	(Belgium) Jean-Philippe Orban	Team La Licorne	Suzuki	+1 lap	
13	6	(United Kingdom) Tom Herron		Suzuki	+1 lap	
14	11	(France) Michel Rougerie		Suzuki	+2 laps	
15	16	(South Africa) Leslie van Breda		Suzuki	+2 laps	
16	28	(Switzerland) Bruno Kneubühler	RSS Racing Team	Suzuki	+2 laps	
17	26	(United Kingdom) Clive Padgett		Yamaha	+2 laps	
18	19	(United Kingdom) Alex George		Suzuki	+3 laps	
19	33	(Spain) Fernando Gonzalez de Nicolas		Yamaha	+3 laps	
Ret		(Japan) Ikujiro Takai	Yamaha Motor Company	Yamaha	Accident	
Ret		(Italy) Virginio Ferrari	Team Gallina Nava Olio Fiat	Suzuki	Retired	
Ret		(Austria) Max Wiener		Suzuki	Clutch	
Ret		(Italy) Marco Lucchinelli	Cagiva Corse	Suzuki	Accident	
Ret		(Switzerland) Philippe Coulon	Marlboro Nava Total	Suzuki	Retired	
Ret		(United Kingdom) John Newbold	Ray Hamblin Motorcycles	Suzuki	Retired	
Ret		(France) Olivier Chevallier		Yamaha	Retired	
Ret		(South Africa) Jon Ekerold	Suzuki Deutschland	Suzuki	Retired	
Ret		(Finland) Pentti Korhonen	RSS Racing Team	Yamaha	Retired	
DNS		(Spain) Carlos Delgado de San Antonio		Suzuki	Did not start	
DNQ		(United Kingdom) Eddie Roberts		Suzuki	Did not qualify	
DNQ		(Venezuela) Francisco Perez		Suzuki	Did not qualify	
DNQ		(Italy) Gianni Rolando	Team Librenti	Suzuki	Did not qualify	
DNQ		(Finland) Kimmo Kopra		Yamaha	Did not qualify	
DNQ		(Finland) Seppo Ojala		Yamaha	Did not qualify	
DNQ		(Spain) Víctor Palomo	Sonauto	Buton	Did not qualify	

=== 250cc ===
Pos	No.	Rider	Manufacturer	Laps	Time	Grid	Points
1	50	(Australia) Gregg Hansford	Kawasaki	30	49:27.3	2	15
2	40	(United States) Kenny Roberts	Yamaha	30	+10.3	1	12
3	2	(Italy) Franco Uncini	Yamaha	30	+45.8	3	10
4	6	(South Africa) Kork Ballington	Kawasaki	30	+50.2	4	8
5	8	(South Africa) Jon Ekerold	Yamaha	30	+1:21.9	7	6
6	9	(United Kingdom) Mick Grant	Kawasaki	30	+1:22.6	12	5
7	14	(France) Olivier Chevallier	Yamaha	29	+1 lap	8	4
8	5	(United Kingdom) Tom Herron	Yamaha	29	+1 lap	13	3
9	3	(Australia) Ray Quincey	Yamaha	29	+1 lap	17	2
10	12	(United Kingdom) Chas Mortimer	Yamaha	29	+1 lap	9	1
11	16	(West Germany) Anton Mang	Kawasaki	29	+1 lap		
12	18	(Australia) Vic Soussan	Yamaha	29	+1 lap	16	
13	11	(Finland) Pentti Korhonen	Yamaha	29	+1 lap	11	
14	7	(South Africa) Les van Breda	Yamaha	29	+1 lap	19	
15	17	(Spain) Ángel Nieto	Bultaco	29	+1 lap	19	
16	31	(Spain) Carlos Morante	Yamaha	29	+1 lap		
17	28	(Venezuela) Eduardo Alemán	Yamaha	29	+1 lap		
18	46	(Finland) Eero Hyvärinen	Yamaha	28	+2 laps		
19	48	(Switzerland) Roland Freymond	Yamaha	28	+2 laps		
		(Italy) Mario Lega	Morbidelli			5	
		(France) Patrick Fernandez	Yamaha			6	
		(Italy) Paolo Pileri	Morbidelli			10	
		(Australia) John Dodds	Yamaha			14	
		(Spain) Benjamin Grau	Derbi			15	
		(Italy) Pierluigi Conforti	Yamaha			18	
		(Venezuela) Carlos Lavado	Yamaha			20	
29 starters in total

=== 125cc classification ===
Pos	No.	Rider	Manufacturer	Laps	Time	Grid	Points
1	2	(Italy) Eugenio Lazzarini	MBA	27	47:54.8	2	15
2	11	(France) Thierry Espié	Motobécane	27	+36.7	4	12
3	6	(Austria) Harald Bartol	Morbidelli	27	+1:05.9	8	10
4	36	(United Kingdom) Clive Horton	Morbidelli	27	+1:23.5	13	8
5	22	(Italy) Felice Agostini	Morbidelli	27	+1:35.1	7	6
6	4	(France) Jean-Louis Guignabodet	Morbidelli	27	+1:43.9	9	5
7	31	(Spain) Miguel Cortes	Morbidelli	27	+1:46.9	14	4
8	16	(France) Thierry Noblesse	Morbidelli	27	+1:47.9	10	3
9	24	(Sweden) Per-Edward Carlson	Morbidelli	27	+1:48.3	15	2
10	21	(France) Patrick Plisson	Morbidelli	26	+1 lap	12	1
11	39	(Belgium) Julien van Zeebroeck	Morbidelli	26	+1 lap	18	
12	26	(Venezuela) Ivan Palazzese	Morbidelli	26	+1 lap	19	
13	18	(Switzerland) Rolf Blatter	Morbidelli	26	+1 lap		
14	7	(Switzerland) Stefan Dörflinger	Morbidelli	26	+1 lap	16	
15	15	(Netherlands) Cees van Dongen	Morbidelli	26	+1 lap		
16	14	(West Germany) Walter Koschine	Morbidelli	26	+1 lap		
17	38	(Spain) Francisco Roman	Motobécane	26	+1 lap		
18	23	(Italy) Fabrizio Frollani	Morbidelli	25	+2 laps	17	
		(Italy) Pierpaolo Bianchi	Minarelli			1	
		(Spain) Ángel Nieto	Bultaco			3	
		(Italy) Maurizio Massimiani	Morbidelli			5	
		(Italy) Pierluigi Conforti	Morbidelli			6	
		(Switzerland) Hans Müller	Morbidelli			11	
		(France) François Granon	Morbidelli			20	
28 starters in total

=== 50cc classification ===
Pos	No.	Rider	Manufacturer	Laps	Time	Grid	Points
1	2	(Italy) Eugenio Lazzarini	Kreidler	18	35:02.5	1	15
2	3	(Spain) Ricardo Tormo	Bultaco	18	+4.2	2	12
3	4	(France) Patrick Plisson	ABF	18	+1:05.8	4	10
4	18	(West Germany) Wolfgang Müller	Kreidler	18	+1:14.6	5	8
5	14	(Netherlands) Cees van Dongen	Kreidler	18	+1:46.7	11	6
6	32	(France) Daniel Corvi	Kreidler	18	+1:56.6		5
7	9	(Netherlands) Theo Timmer	Kreidler	18	+2:04.6	9	4
8	6	(Spain) Ramón Gali	Bultaco	17	+1 lap	20	3
9	12	(Italy) Aldo Pero	Kreidler	17	+1 lap	12	2
10	34	(Spain) Javier Mira	Kreidler	17	+1 lap	9	4
11	28	(Spain) Jorge Navarrete	Bultaco	17	+1 lap	15	
12	24	(France) Jacques Hutteau	Kreidler	17	+1 lap		
13	11	(Switzerland) Rolf Blatter	Kreidler	17	+1 lap		
14	10	(West Germany) Rudolf Kunz	Kreidler	17	+1 lap	13	
15	31	(Spain) Vicente Ferrer	Kreidler	17	+1 lap		
16	27	(Portugal) Henrique Sande	Kreidler	14	+4 laps		
NC	30	(Spain) Salvador Ventosa	Kreidler	12	+6 laps		
		(Switzerland) Stefan Dörflinger	Kreidler			3	
		(West Germany) Ingo Emmerich	Kreidler			6	
		(Belgium) Julien van Zeebroeck	Kreidler			7	
		(Spain) Gaspar Legaz	Kreidler			8	
		(Italy) Claudio Lusuardi	Bultaco			10	
		(Netherlands) Peter Looyestein	Kreidler			14	
		(West Germany) Hagen Klein	Kreidler			16	
		(Spain) Joaquín Gali	Kreidler			17	
		(Belgium) Pierre Dumont	Kreidler			18	
		(Belgium) Charles Dumont	Kreidler			19	
27 starters in total

Previous race: 1978 Venezuelan Grand Prix	FIM Grand Prix World Championship; 1978 season	Next race: 1978 Austrian Grand Prix
Previous race: 1977 Spanish Grand Prix	Spanish Grand Prix	Next race: 1979 Spanish Grand Prix
