= Venezuelan motorcycle Grand Prix =

Venezuelan Grand Prix
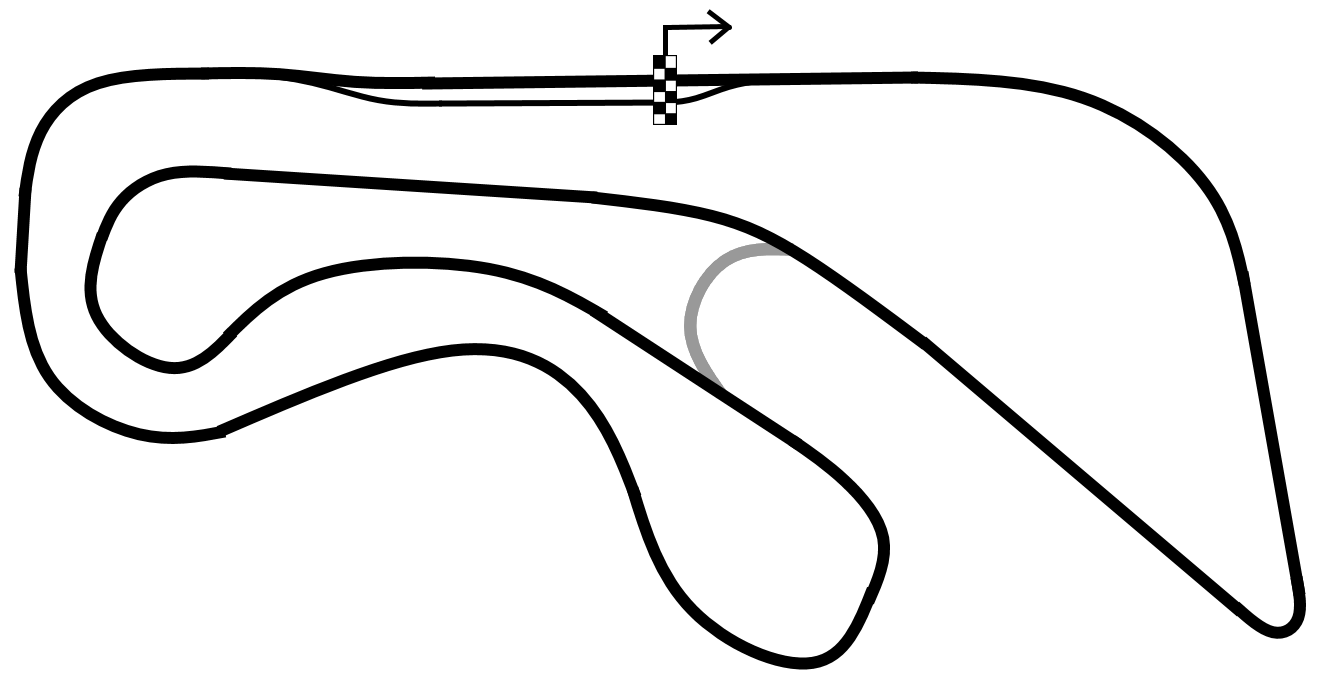

Grand Prix motorcycle racing
- Venue: San Carlos Circuit (1977–1979)
- First race: 1977
- Last race: 1979
- Most wins (rider): Barry Sheene (3)
- Most wins (manufacturer): Yamaha (5)

The Venezuelan motorcycle Grand Prix was a motorcycling event that was part of the Grand Prix motorcycle racing season from 1977 to 1979.

== Official names and sponsors ==
- 1977: Grand Prix de Venezuela (no official sponsor)
- 1978: II Grand Prix de Venezuela (no official sponsor)
- 1979: Gran Premio de Venezuela (no official sponsor)

== Winners ==
=== Multiple winners (riders) ===
# Wins	Rider	Wins	
# Wins	Rider	Category	Years won
3	(United Kingdom) Barry Sheene	500cc	1977, 1978, 1979
2	(Spain) Ángel Nieto	125cc	1977, 1979
2	(Italy) Walter Villa	250cc	1977, 1979

=== Multiple winners (manufacturers) ===
# Wins	Manufacturer	Wins	
# Wins	Manufacturer	Category	Years won
5	(Japan) Yamaha	350cc	1977, 1978, 1979
5	(Japan) Yamaha	250cc	1978, 1979
3	(Japan) Suzuki	500cc	1977, 1978, 1979
2	(Italy) Minarelli	125cc	1978, 1979

=== By year ===
Year	Track	50cc		125cc		250cc		350cc		500cc		Report
Year	Track	Rider	Manufacturer	Rider	Manufacturer	Rider	Manufacturer	Rider	Manufacturer	Rider	Manufacturer	Report
1979	San Carlos Circuit			(Spain) Ángel Nieto	Minarelli	(Italy) Walter Villa	Yamaha	(Venezuela) Carlos Lavado	Yamaha	(United Kingdom) Barry Sheene	Suzuki	Report
1978	San Carlos Circuit			(Italy) Pier Paolo Bianchi	Minarelli	(United States) Kenny Roberts	Yamaha	(Japan) Takazumi Katayama	Yamaha	(United Kingdom) Barry Sheene	Suzuki	Report
1977	San Carlos Circuit			(Spain) Ángel Nieto	Bultaco	(Italy) Walter Villa	Harley Davidson	(Venezuela) Johnny Cecotto	Yamaha	(United Kingdom) Barry Sheene	Suzuki	Report
