= 1977 Venezuelan motorcycle Grand Prix =

(Venezuela) 1977 Venezuelan Grand Prix
Race details
- Race 1 of 13 races in the 1977 Grand Prix motorcycle racing season
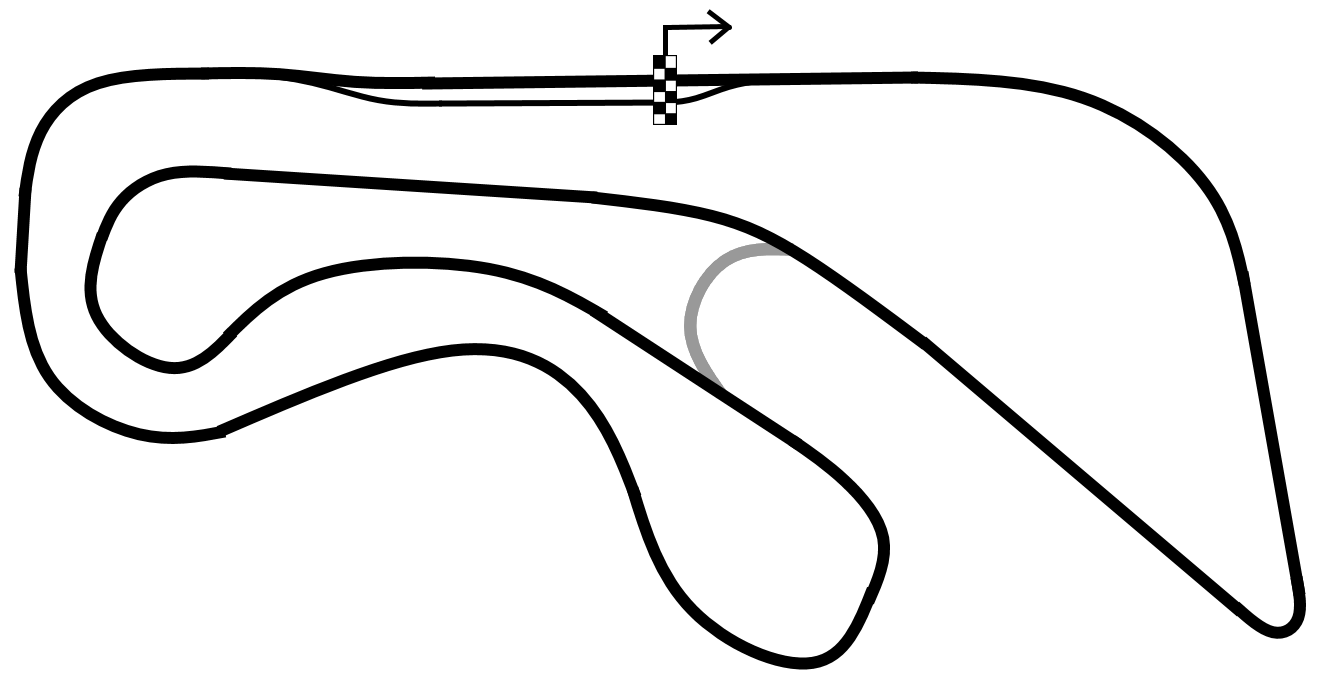
- Date: 20 March 1977
- Official name: Grand Prix de Venezuela
- Location: Autodromo Internacional de San Carlos
- Course: Permanent racing facility; 4.135 km (2.569 mi)

500cc
Pole position
- Rider: (Venezuela) Johnny Cecotto
- Time: 1:36.100
Fastest lap
- Rider: (United Kingdom) Barry Sheene (United States) Steve Baker
- Time: 1:35.800
Podium
- First: (United Kingdom) Barry Sheene
- Second: (United States) Steve Baker
- Third: (United States) Pat Hennen

350cc
Pole position
- Rider: (Venezuela) Johnny Cecotto
- Time: 1:39.000
Fastest lap
- Rider: (Venezuela) Johnny Cecotto
- Time: 1:38.200
Podium
- First: (Venezuela) Johnny Cecotto
- Second: (Spain) Victor Palomo
- Third: (France) Patrick Fernandez

250cc
Pole position
- Rider: (Italy) Franco Uncini
- Time: 1:40.800
Fastest lap
- Rider: (Italy) Walter Villa
- Time: 1:40.800
Podium
- First: (Italy) Walter Villa
- Second: (France) Patrick Fernandez
- Third: (Spain) Victor Palomo

125cc
Pole position
- Rider: (Spain) Ángel Nieto
- Time: 1:47.300
Fastest lap
- Rider: (Spain) Ángel Nieto
- Time: 1:47.000
Podium
- First: (Spain) Ángel Nieto
- Second: (West Germany) Anton Mang
- Third: (Venezuela) Iván Palazzese

The 1977 Venezuelan motorcycle Grand Prix was the first round of the 1977 Grand Prix motorcycle racing season. It took place on 20 March 1977 at the San Carlos Circuit.

== 500cc classification ==
Pos.	No.	Rider	Team	Manufacturer	Time/Retired	Points
1	7	(United Kingdom) Barry Sheene	Texaco Heron Team Suzuki	Suzuki	48'56.900	15
2	32	(United States) Steve Baker	Yamaha Motor Company	Yamaha	+3.300	12
3	3	(United States) Pat Hennen	Texaco Heron Team Suzuki	Suzuki	+39.000	10
4	20	(Venezuela) Johnny Cecotto	Team Venemotos	Yamaha	+42.600	8
5	16	(Switzerland) Philippe Coulon	Marlboro Masche Total	Suzuki	+58.100	6
6	12	(Italy) Virginio Ferrari	Team Nava Olio Fiat	Suzuki	+1'25.000	5
7	19	(Italy) Marco Lucchinelli	Life Racing Team	Suzuki	+1'31.300	4
8	4	(France) Christian Estrosi	Marlboro Masche Total	Suzuki	+1 lap	3
9	8	(United Kingdom) Steve Parrish	Texaco Heron Team Suzuki	Suzuki	+1 lap	2
10	29	(South Africa) Alan North	Wilddam Konserven Holland	Yamaha	+2 laps	1
Ret	??	(Finland) Teuvo Länsivuori	Life Racing Team	Suzuki	Accident	
Ret	??	(Italy) Gianfranco Bonera	Team Nava Olio Fiat	Suzuki	Retired	
Ret	??	(Netherlands) Marcel Ankoné	Pullshaw	Suzuki	Retired	
Ret	??	(Italy) Giovanni Rolando		Suzuki	Retired	

== 350 cc classification ==
Pos	No.	Rider	Manufacturer	Laps	Time	Grid	Points
1	2	(Venezuela) Johnny Cecotto	Yamaha	29	48:20.1	1	15
2	31	(Spain) Víctor Palomo	Yamaha	29	+29.6	2	12
3	16	(France) Patrick Fernandez	Yamaha	29	+38.5	7	10
4	21	(Finland) Pentti Korhonen	Yamaha	29	+1:10.3	4	8
5	17	(United Kingdom) Tom Herron	Yamaha	28	+1 lap	14	6
6	29	(South Africa) Alan North	Yamaha	28	+1 lap	12	5
7	3	(Venezuela) Pedro Mezerhane	Yamaha	28	+1 lap	16	4
8	37	(Venezuela) Carlos Bellón	Yamaha	28	+1 lap	17	3
9	36	(Venezuela) Eduardo Aleman	Yamaha	28	+1 lap		2
10	44	(Italy) Raoul Tausani	Yamaha	28	+1 lap		1
11	46	(Chile) C. Haleby	Yamaha	28	+1 lap	19	
12	25	(Chile) V. Cascino	Harley-Davidson	27	+2 laps		
13	45	(Costa Rica) C. Cortes	Harley-Davidson	26	+3 laps		
		(Venezuela) Jose Cecotto	Yamaha			3	
		(South Africa) Kork Ballington	Yamaha			5	
		(Italy) Walter Villa	Harley-Davidson			6	
		(Venezuela) R. Cardozo	Yamaha			8	
		(Italy) Franco Uncini	Harley-Davidson			9	
		(Venezuela) F. Dalle	Yamaha			10	
		(France) Olivier Chevallier	Yamaha			11	
		(United Kingdom) Chas Mortimer	Yamaha			13	
		(Venezuela) M. Luger	Yamaha			15	
		(Switzerland) Roland Freymond	Yamaha			18	
		(Brazil) U. Rioss	Yamaha			20	
27 starters in total

== 250 cc classification ==
Pos	No.	Rider	Manufacturer	Laps	Time	Grid	Points
1	1	(Italy) Walter Villa	Harley-Davidson	28	47:56.1	2	15
2	16	(France) Patrick Fernandez	Yamaha	28	+20.5	3	12
3	20	(Spain) Víctor Palomo	Yamaha	28	+35.7	7	10
4	9	(Finland) Pentti Korhonen	Yamaha	28	+56.1	12	8
5	8	(South Africa) Kork Ballington	Yamaha	28	+1:11.1	9	6
6	17	(United Kingdom) Tom Herron	Yamaha	28	+1:19.4	10	5
7	3	(Venezuela) Aldo Nannini	Yamaha	28	+1:29.5	14	4
8	21	(France) Olivier Chevallier	Yamaha	28	+1:30.4	5	3
9	13	(Italy) Mario Lega	Morbidelli	27	+1 lap	8	2
10	14	(Colombia) Mauro Corradini	Yamaha	26	+2 laps	17	1
11	30	(Venezuela) J. Canache	Yamaha	26	+2 laps	16	
12	25	(Chile) V. Cascino	Harley-Davidson	26	+2 laps		
13	26	(Venezuela) M. F. Mojica	Yamaha	26	+2 laps	19	
14	28	(Venezuela) A. Mireles	Yamaha	25	+3 laps	20	
		(Italy) Franco Uncini	Harley-Davidson			1	
		(Italy) Paolo Pileri	Morbidelli			4	
		(Venezuela) R. Cardozo	Yamaha			6	
		(Spain) Ángel Nieto	Yamaha			11	
		(Venezuela) G. Laya	Yamaha			13	
		(Venezuela) E. Alemán	Yamaha			15	
		(Colombia) O. Echevarria	Yamaha			18	
22 starters in total

== 125 cc classification ==
Pos	No.	Rider	Manufacturer	Laps	Time	Grid	Points
1	2	(Spain) Ángel Nieto	Bultaco	27	50:22.4	1	15
2	19	(Germany) Anton Mang	Morbidelli	27	+2.5	3	12
3	5	(Venezuela) Iván Palazzese	Morbidelli	27	+1:05.6	7	10
4	34	(Italy) Rino Pretelli	Morbidelli	27	+1:48.2	9	8
5	32	(Belgium) Julien van Zeebroeck	Morbidelli	27	+1:48.7	11	6
6	18	(Argentina) Guillermo Pérez	Yamaha	24	+3 laps	15	5
7	12	(Venezuela) Rafael Olavarria	Yamaha	24	+3 laps	18	4
		(Italy) Pierpaolo Bianchi	Morbidelli			2	
		(Italy) Maurizio Massinani	Morbidelli			4	
		(Venezuela) Aldo Nannini	Yamaha			5	
		(Italy) Germano Zanetti	Morbidelli			6	
		(Netherlands) Henk van Kessel	Condor			8	
		(Argentina) Victorio Minguzzi	Yamaha			10	
		(Argentina) P. Catania	Morbidelli			12	
		(Argentina) J. Vignetti	Morbidelli			13	
		(Argentina) F. González	Morbidelli			14	
		(Venezuela) R. Morantes	Yamaha			16	
		(Venezuela) B. Orioli	Yamaha			17	
16 starters in total

Previous race: 1976 Spanish Grand Prix	FIM Grand Prix World Championship; 1977 season	Next race: 1977 Austrian Grand Prix
Previous race: None	Venezuelan Grand Prix	Next race: 1978 Venezuelan Grand Prix
