= Nick Harris (commentator) =

English motorsport commentator, journalist and author

- Born: Nick Harris; 1947, 78 years old Cumnor, Oxfordshire, England
- Education: Cumnor CE School; Magdalen College
- Occupations: Commentator; journalist; author
- Employers: Oxford Journal (1973–1975); BBC Radio Oxford (1973–present); BBC World Service (1996–present); BBC Radio 5 Live (????–????); BT Sport (1999–2017); Channel Nine (????–????); talkSPORT (????–????)
- Spouse: Sheila Harris

Nick Harris, informally known as Harry, is an English motorsport commentator, journalist and author. He provided television commentary of live MotoGP coverage for the official MotoGP world feed between 1999 and 2017. He is known as 'the voice of MotoGP'.

During his 18-year run as full-time commentator, Harris became known for his uniquely enthusiastic and authoritative voice. He retired from full-time commentary after the final race of the 2017 MotoGP World Championship at the Circuit Ricardo Tormo in Valencia, where he held his last post-race interview with multiple prominent riders at the time such as Valentino Rossi, Dani Pedrosa, Jorge Lorenzo and Marc Márquez. Since then, he still writes blog posts by the name of Nick Harris Blog before the start of each race, which get published on the official MotoGP website.

== Early life ==
Harris was born in 1947 at the Radcliffe Infirmary in Oxford and lived in the small village of Cumnor, near Oxford in Oxfordshire, England. His father was a big sports entheusiast and growing up, he loved playing sports himself. He was also a big fan of his local football club Oxford United, whom he supports to this day. While his parents were not very interested in motorcycle racing or racing in general, Harris' interest for motorcycle racing was first sparked when he first saw motocross races on his parents' black-and-white television. This is also where he first saw Isle of Man TT winner Graham Walker and his son Murray Walker, who started his commentator career around this time. When he discovered the Motorcycle speedway at the Oxford Stadium in Cowley and later visited Mallory Park with his father, where he saw and heard the six-cylinder Honda of Mike Hailwood for the first time, this interest was further sparked.

When he was a child, he attended Cumnor CE School. During his teenage years, he went to Magdalen College but left with one O level after two "pathetic attempts", as he called it himself in his autobiography. Harris went to school with motocross rider Keith Hickman and knew his brother very well. After graduation, his parents offered him a job as a clerk in a local solicitors' office but was not suited for the job. At his next job he worked behind the counter in a sports shop while also working as a disc jockey in the evenings to further increase his income. His third job involved being a representative for "a Manchester-based sports company".

In his autobiography Never Say Never: The Inside Story of the Motorcycle World Championships, Harris has stated that he likes cricket and has played it for over 50 years but prefers playing football instead. He also stated that he frequently suffered from acute homesickness and wrote postcards to his parents every day as a result.

In 1973, Harris witnessed his first ever grand prix motorcycle racing grand prix, which was the 1973 Dutch TT.

== Career as a journalist ==
At the end of 1972, Tony Rosser founded the Oxford Journal and asked Harris to become the distribution manager. Initially he declined the offer but when Rosser offered him three times the salary, he joined the journal two weeks later in January 1973. One of his personal best and interesting reports came in the same year when he was sent to Italy to report on the 1973 Anglo-Italian Cup match between Bologna and Oxford United, where he sat in a private jet next to a Scottish international footballer who had scored a goal against England at the old Wembley Stadium. When he returned a few days later, he met Tony Adamson who worked as a sports reporter for BBC Radio Oxford at the time. There, he asked Harris if he would "give up playing football on a Saturday to come into their studio to read the football results and make the tea."

After his career at the Oxford Journal, he joined Motorcycle News in 1975 after applying for a job as general reporter. For the interview in Kettering, he felt "vastly underqualified" but went anyway. He worked in both the British road racing and later, in 1976, in the motocross departments. A part of his job as a road racing reporter was finding a phone or telex machine to get results and reports through, which took up to three hours. Harris found those days as motocross reporter to be "exciting" because he could travel, stay in hotels and write various reports, but felt it was different compared to writing reports for motorcycle grand prix races. He moved up to news editor and later still he joined Motor Cycle Weekly as a sports editor in 1979.

In 1980, Harris witnessed his first grand prix motorcycle racing grand prix as a journalist - the 1980 Dutch TT. While he was a fan from the paddock, he did not really follow the World Motorcycle Championship until the late 1970s because he was always at the Isle of Man TT. He was unlucky because there was a strike going on when he first started, preventing him from going to the first three rounds of the season.

== Career as a commentator ==
Harris' first private commentary was in 1974 when he called a North Gloucestershire club meeting over the phone from a sergeant's mess at a Royal Air Force base in Oxfordshire. During his period in Formula One, he also worked for the BBC Radio in the motorcycle department.

=== Grand prix motorcycle racing ===
Harris first started his commentary work at the start of the 1999 season. His commentaries have been broadcast on multiple English-speaking outlets - from M-Net in South Africa to Speedvision in Canada. He also has provided reports and features on the radio for the BBC World Service and BBC Radio 5 Live. He commentated on the races during the summer.

Besides his commentaries, Harris also hosted the commentary of the post-race conferences, wrote the press releases and looked after the British media.

At the end of the 2017 season, Harris announced that he would retire from commentating after 18 years. At his last post-race commentary, Valentino Rossi interrupted him and asked him to come and sit with the riders, with Rossi then showing him a specially constructed thank-you video that Dorna had created for him. The video consists of multiple motorcycle racers like Jorge Lorenzo, Dani Pedrosa Cal Crutchlow and Jack Miller reciting some of his classic lines, as well as former FIM president Vito Ippolito, other grand prix motorcycle riders and sports figures praising him for all his work as a commentator. After the video ends, an emotional Harris returns to his seat to start the interview in a fun manner. Over 1.2 million people have since seen his thank you video, which was hosted by world champions such as Rossi and Márquez.

Harris considers two moments during his commentary career as his best - the 2004 South African motorcycle Grand Prix where Valentino Rossi narrowly won his first-ever race for Yamaha against Max Biaggi and the 2003 South African motorcycle Grand Prix where Sete Gibernau narrowly won from Rossi after his teammate Daijiro Kato lost his life in an accident during the previous race. His worst moments were when Marco Simoncelli was killed at the 2011 Malaysian motorcycle Grand Prix as well as Shoya Tomizawa's death at the 2010 San Marino and Rimini Riviera motorcycle Grand Prix.

=== Football ===
His first public broadcast came in 1973, when he started commentating the football matches of Oxford United. Since then, he has covered matches in all four divisions of the English football league as well as two English Football League Trophy trophy finals at Wembley Stadium - one in 2016 and another one in 2017. He commentates on the matches during the winter. He also was a member of the board of directors for the team for six years, from 1994 to 1999. Harris revealed in his autobiography Never Say Never: The Inside Story of the Motorcycle World Championships that his club was in financial troubles in the final year of his work on the board of directors. After he retired from commenting on the MotoGP series, he stated that he would continue to commentate the football matches of Oxford United on the BBC.

== Commentary style ==
Over the course of his grand prix motorcycle racing commentary history, Harris has attracted mixed and even polarising opinions on his particular style of uniquely enthusiastic commentating. Some praise him for this as well as his overall passion, familiar expressions during the races and his decades of involvement in the sport which gave him great knowledge and understanding of grand prix motorcycle racing while others criticise him for his overusing of certain phrases, his use of cliché's, the mistakes he sometimes made and his early beginnings at Rothmans.

== Career as an author ==
Over the span of forty years, Harris has written numerous books related to grand prix motorcycle racing. His first book was written and released in 1986 in collaboration with author Peter Clifford and is called Fast Freddie: Double World Champion Freddie Spencer, the Man and His Machines (Motorcycles and Motorcycling). It is an autobiography of two-time 500cc world champion Freddie Spencer. The book was officially published on May 26, 1986, by Motor Racing Publications Ltd. The second book is called Motocourse History of the Isle of Man Tourist Trophy Races 1907 - 1989, was released in 1990 and was also translated into German. In 2007 his third book - a biography on the life of Barry Sheene - was released in collaboration with former grand prix motorcycle racer Steve Parrish with the title Barry: The Story of Motorcycling Legend, Barry Sheene. To date, this is Harris' most successful book, reaching the Bestseller List of books of The Sunday Times and being published in Australia and Germany. Harris' fourth book, Racing Together 1949-2016, was written together with prominent grand prix motorcycle racing figures Vito Ippolito, Carmelo Ezpeleta and Hervé Poncharal and commissioned by Dorna Sports. This book goes in-depth on the history of grand prix motorcycle racing up to the 2016 season. In 2018, he hinted in an interview with Fast Bikes India that he was writing a book about his life travelling the world in MotoGP and Formula One. His fifth and most recent book came out in 2019 with the title Never Say Never: The Inside Story of the Motorcycle World Championships, which is an autobiography of the life of Nick Harris. Penguin Random House UK, though Virgin Books, published an audio book which was narrated by Nick as well as a paperback version in 2020.

== Business life ==
In 1983 he founded his own agency with the name "Nick Harris Media Communications". Over the span of his life, Harris has also done promotional work for the Silverstone Armstrong team with Niall Mackenzie and Donnie McLeod for their 250cc and 350cc teams and has been a media manager for the Rothmans Honda Team of Luca Cadalora, Anton Mang. Eddie Lawson and Wayne Gardner when he was laid off after Motor Cycle Weekly was shut down.

When Rothmans moved its operations to Formula One and sponsor the Williams F1 team from the 1994 season onwards, Harris followed suit and joined the world of Formula One as their press secretary and media manager. Keen on continuing his passion for motorcycle racing, he went to all the Formula One races as well as a third of the motorcycle races that year. He found this to be quite tough. Harris and his business worked on the media communications and public relations part when Rothmans joined the sport in 1994 in the form of photographs, video's and broadcasts as well a Formula One pre-season guide. Harris also helped to organize and host press conferences and tours throughout the world. When Rothmans and Williams parted ways, he came back to grand prix motorcycle racing. Overall, Harris worked in Formula One from the 1994 to the 2000 season. During this period, he celebrated two world titles with Rothmans - one with Damon Hill in 1996 and one with Jacques Villeneuve in 1997. When he initially entered, he was nervous because he was a new employee and did not know anyone. However, upon discovering that most people in the Formula One world loved football and motorcycling, he quickly warmed up to the atmosphere. During his Formula One period, he also worked for the BBC Radio in the motorcycle division.

When JT International joined MotoGP as an advertiser via its brand Camel in 2003, Harris and his business helped to set up the press service and organise the launch of the brand. They also provided all the written copies for their media guides, previews and features for their press service as well as a website and specialised features.

Besides his work for Rothmans, Harris has also narrated multiple programmes, video's and advertisements for companies like Yamaha and Castrol, and has hosted presentations for Tissot, Honda. Harris has also worked with the IRTA and Dorna Sports since 2004 and 2000 respectively.

== Personal life ==
Harris is married to Sheila and the couple have one daughter.

In an interview with the German Speedweek magazine, Harris revealed that he had never learned any languages and that he regrets this decision. He also revealed that, in 2003, he met the father of future motorcyclist Bradley Smith at a local pub in Oxford, who said his son wanted to get into grand prix motorcycle racing at the time. In an interview with the Golden Triangle Rider in 2017, Harris said that he suffers from tunnel vision and therefor does not ride his motorcycle anymore. He also mentioned he was great friends with Barry Sheene, Wayne Gardner and Bradley Smith.
