= Mat Oxley =

Journalist and former motorcycle racer

- Nationality: British
- Born: March 1959 (age 67)
- Website: www.matoxley.com
Motorcycle racing career statistics
Isle of Man TT career
TTs contested	6
Active years	1984–1989
TT wins	1
First TT win	1985 Production 250cc
TT podiums	4

Mat Oxley (born 1959) is a former motorcycle racer, motorcycle journalist, and author.

Oxley started his racing career in production bike racing, taking part in the Yamaha RD350LC championship in 1983 and 1984.

Oxley won an Isle of Man TT race in 1985 at his second attempt, as a racing-journalist working for Motor Cycle News. Aside from his TT racing career, he specialised in endurance racing, with a best of second at the 24 Hours of Le Mans and at the 24 Hours of Spa.

Oxley has written regular columns on the web version of Motor Sport since 2012. He is an author of several books on motorcycle racing and its history, and is known to have been a ghostwriter on Valentino Rossi's 2004 book, What If I Had Never Tried It.

== Full TT results ==
1984	Production 250cc 3
1985	Production 250cc 1
1986	Production D 3
1987	Production D 3
1988	Production D 4
1989	Supersport 400cc 5
