= San Carlos Circuit =

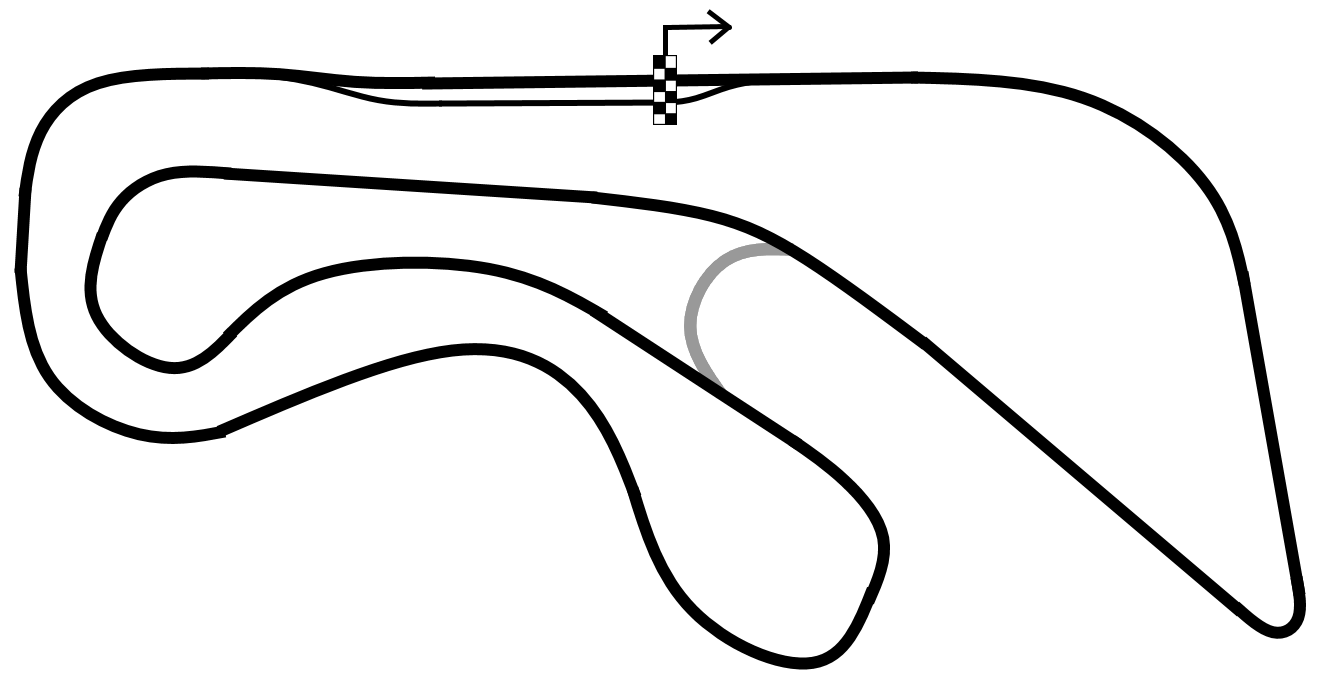
- Grand Prix Circuit (1977–present)
- Location: San Carlos, Venezuela
- Coordinates: 9°39′49″N 68°33′14″W
- Opened: 1970
- Major events: Panam GP Series (2012); Grand Prix motorcycle racing Venezuelan motorcycle Grand Prix (1977–1979); Formula 750 (1976)

Grand Prix Circuit (1977–present)
- Length: 4.135 km (2.569 mi)
- Turns: 11 (7 right, 4 left)
- Race lap record: 1:34.080 ( (United Kingdom) Barry Sheene, Suzuki RG 500, 1979, 500cc)

Short Circuit (1976–present)
- Length: 3.135 km (1.948 mi)
- Turns: 8

Original Circuit (1970–1975)
- Length: 2.700 km (1.678 mi)
- Turns: 7

San Carlos Circuit is a motorsport race track located in San Carlos, Venezuela. From 1977 to 1979, it hosted the Venezuelan motorcycle Grand Prix.

== Lap records ==
The fastest official race lap records at the San Carlos Circuit are listed as:

Category	Time	Driver	Vehicle	Event
Grand Prix Circuit (1977–present): 4.135 km (2.569 mi)
500cc	1:34.080	Barry Sheene	Suzuki RG 500	1979 Venezuelan motorcycle Grand Prix
350cc	1:34.490	Carlos Lavado	Yamaha TZ 350	1979 Venezuelan motorcycle Grand Prix
250cc	1:37.550	Walter Villa	Yamaha TZ 250	1979 Venezuelan motorcycle Grand Prix
125cc	1:43.480	Ángel Nieto	Minarelli 125cc GP	1979 Venezuelan motorcycle Grand Prix
