= Iván Palazzese =

Venezuelan motorcycle racer

- Nationality: (Venezuela) Venezuelan
- Born: 2 January 1962; Alba Adriatica, Italy
- Died: 28 May 1989 (aged 27); Hockenheim, Germany
Motorcycle racing career statistics
Grand Prix motorcycle racing
Active years	1977 - 1989
First race	1977 125cc Venezuelan Grand Prix
Last race	1989 250cc German Grand Prix
First win	1982 125cc Swedish Grand Prix
Last win	1982 125cc Finnish Grand Prix
Team(s)	Morbidelli, Yamaha, Aprilia
Starts / Wins / Podiums / Poles / F. laps / Points; 69 / 2 / 9 / 1 / 2 / 239

Iván Palazzese (2 January 1962 – 28 May 1989) was an Italian born Venezuelan professional motorcycle racer. He competed in the Grand Prix road racing world championships from 1977 to 1989. In 1977, he became the youngest person at the time to stand on a Grand Prix podium, when he finished third behind Angel Nieto and Anton Mang at the 125cc Venezuelan Grand Prix at the age of 15.

== Motorcycle racing career ==
Palazzese was born in Alba Adriatica in the Abruzzo region of central eastern Italy. His family emigrated to Venezuela when he was a child and he became a Venezuelan citizen. Palazzese began his racing career as a teenager, riding a Morbidelli 125 at the San Carlos Circuit.

Palazzese returned to Europe to compete in the Grand Prix world championships as a member of the Venemotos Yamaha racing team alongside his teammates, Johnny Cecotto and Carlos Lavado. Palazzese had his best year in 1982 when he won two 125cc Grands Prix and finished the season in third place, behind Angel Nieto and Eugenio Lazzarini. At the 1983 Dutch TT, Lavado and Palazzese finished in first and second place marking the first time that Venezuelan riders had claimed the top two places in a world championship Grand Prix race.

Palazzese was killed in a racing accident at the 1989 German Grand Prix at the Hockenheimring. He was closely following Andreas Preining when the latter's motorcycle engine seized and abruptly slowed, causing Palazzese to collide with Preining and subsequently crash. While Palazzese was picking himself up off the ground, he was struck by riders Bruno Bonhuil and Fabio Barchitta who both crashed. It was fellow rider Virginio Ferrari who stopped his bike and first came to Palazzese's aid, but Palazzese was already dead having sustained massive chest injuries. He was 27 years old.

There is a monument erected in his honor in the Italian city of Alba Adriatica, where Palazzese was born.

== Motorcycle Grand Prix results ==
Points system from 1968 to 1987

**Position**	1	2	3	4	5	6	7	8	9	10
**Points**	15	12	10	8	6	5	4	3	2	1

Points system from 1988 to 1992

**Position**	1	2	3	4	5	6	7	8	9	10	11	12	13	14	15
**Points**	20	17	15	13	11	10	9	8	7	6	5	4	3	2	1

(key) (Races in bold indicate pole position; races in italics indicate fastest lap)

Year	Class	Team	1	2	3	4	5	6	7	8	9	10	11	12	13	14	15	Points	Rank	Wins
1977	125cc	Morbidelli	VEN; 3	AUT -	GER -	NAT -	ESP -	FRA -	YUG -	NED -	BEL -	SWE -	FIN -	GBR -				10	16th	0
1980	125cc	Morbidelli	NAT; 6	ESP; 2	FRA -	YUG -	NED -	BEL -	FIN -	GBR; 4	CZE; 8	GER -						28	7th	0
1981	125cc	Morbidelli	ARG; RET	AUT -	GER -	NAT -	FRA; 7	ESP; 2	YUG; 6	NED; 5		RSM; RET	GBR -	FIN -	SWE; 3	CZE -		37	7th	0
1982	125cc	Morbidelli	ARG; 5	AUT; RET	FRA -	ESP; RET	NAT -	NED; 6	BEL; RET	YUG; 5	GBR; 5	SWE; 1	FIN; 1	CZE; 2				75	**3rd**	2
1983	250cc	Venemotos Yamaha	RSA; 10	FRA; 14	NAT; 8	GER; RET	ESP; 10	AUT; 18	YUG; RET	NED; 2	BEL; 8	GBR; 16	SWE; 15					20	13th	0
1984	250cc	Venemotos Yamaha	RSA; 8	NAT; RET	ESP; RET	AUT -	GER; RET	FRA; DNQ	YUG; 6	NED; 20	BEL; 4	GBR; DNS	SWE; 16	RSM; 12				16	15th	0
1985	250cc	Venemotos Yamaha	RSA; 14	ESP; 17	GER; RET	NAT; 16	AUT; RET	YUG -	NED -	BEL -	FRA -	GBR -	SWE -	RSM -				0	-	0
1986	250cc	Rotax	ESP -	NAT; 20	GER -	AUT -	YUG -	NED -	BEL -	FRA -	GBR -	SWE -	RSM -					0	-	0
1987	250cc	F.M.V. Yamaha	JPN -	ESP -	GER -	NAT -	AUT -	YUG; 10	NED -	FRA -	GBR -	SWE -	CZE; 8	RSM; 12	POR -	BRA -	ARG -	16	9th	0
1988	250cc	Team Manoca-Yamaha	JPN -	USA -	ESP -	EXP; 21	NAT -	GER -	AUT; 9	NED; 13	BEL -	YUG -	FRA -	GBR; 11	SWE; 6	CZE; 17	BRA -	25	18th	0
1989	250cc	Aprilia	JPN -	AUS; 18	USA; 11	ESP; 11	NAT; 7	GER -	AUT -	YUG -	NED -	BEL -	FRA -	GBR -	SWE -	CZE -	BRA -	19	22nd	0
