= 1986 Isle of Man TT =

Annual motorcycle racing event

Isle of Man TT Mountain Course

The 1986 Isle of Man TT was held from 31 May to 6 June 1986 on the Snaefell Mountain Course on the Isle of Man. The weather severely disrupted the programme, shaking up the races and producing some unexpected, but worthy, wins.

Four riders died: Ian Ogden and Alan Jarvis in training and Andy Cooper in the Senior TT race at Ballig. Gene McDonnell died in what has been described as "the most horrific accident ever witnessed at the TT", when a horse was startled by a helicopter, jumped into the road and collided with McDonnell. Both horse and rider were killed instantly.

== Senior TT (500 cc) classification ==
Source: IOMTT

Pos	No.	Rider	Manufacturer	Time
1		(United Kingdom) Roger Burnett	Rothmans Honda	1.59.09.8
2		(United Kingdom) Geoff Johnson	Honda	+1:08
3		(United Kingdom) Barry Woodland	Suzuki	+1:36
4		(United Kingdom) Joey Dunlop	Rothmans Honda	+2:11
5		(United Kingdom) Phil Mellor	Suzuki	+2:32
6		(United Kingdom) Roger Marshall	Rothmans Honda	+2:39
7		(United Kingdom) Dave Leach	Yamaha	+3:36
8		(Canada) Kevin Wilson	Suzuki	+3:45
9		(Republic of Ireland) Sam McClements	Suzuki	+3:47
10		(Australia) Graeme McGregor	Suzuki	+4:07
103 starters in total, 49 finishers
Fastest lap :

== Production Class D TT classification ==
Source: IOMTT

Pos	No.	Rider	Manufacturer	Time
1		(United Kingdom) Barry Woodland	Skoal Bandit Suzuki	01:08:02
2		(Isle of Man) Graham Cannell	Mitsui Yamaha	+0:18
3		(United Kingdom) Matt Oxley	Yamaha	+0:45
4		(United Kingdom) Peter Bateson	Honda	+1:11
5		(New Zealand) Glenn Williams	Suzuki	+1:15
6		(Isle of Man) Chris Fargher	Suzuki	+1:15
7		(United Kingdom) Gary Padgett	Yamaha	+1:51
8		(United Kingdom) Kevin Mawdsley	Honda	+2:25
9		(United Kingdom) Steve Williams	Fowler Yamaha	+2:27
10		(United Kingdom) Jamie Whitham	Suzuki	+3:09
39 starters in total, 37 finishers
Fastest lap :

== Formula One TT classification ==
Source: IOMTT

Pos	No.	Rider	Manufacturer	Time
1		(United Kingdom) Joey Dunlop	Rothmans Honda	01:20:09
2		(United Kingdom) Geoff Johnson	Honda	+0:57
3		(United Kingdom) Andy McGladdery	Growler Suzuki	+1:27
4		(United Kingdom) John Weeden	Suzuki	+1:47
5		(United Kingdom) Phil Mellor	Suzuki	+2:03
6		(United Kingdom) Trevor Nation	Suzuki	+2:23
7		(Australia) Graeme McGregor	Suzuki	+2:36
8		(United Kingdom) Gary Padgett	Padgett Suzuki	+3:04
9		(New Zealand) Glenn Williams	Suzuki	+3:19
10		(Germany) Klaus Klein	HG Suzuki	+3:20
100 starters in total, 82 finishers
Fastest lap :
