= Barry Woodland =

British motorcycle racer

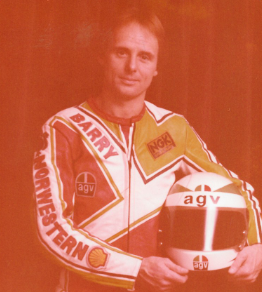
- Woodland In 1982
- Nationality: English
- Born: 3 September 1947 (age 79); Watford, England
Motorcycle racing career statistics
Isle of Man TT career
TTs contested	31 (1980 – 1990)
TT wins	3
First TT win	1986 Production D TT
Last TT win	1988 Production D TT
TT podiums	5

Barry Woodland is a British former Grand Prix motorcycle road racer.

Woodland won the "Grovewood Award" in 1976. The award was given by the motoring press to the rider showing most promise as best young rider of the year.

In 1977, Woodland was sponsored by Mitsui UK, the British Yamaha Importers, on both 250cc and 350cc machines. He competed in Europe, North and South America up until 1985.

Woodland won the Production D class at the Isle of Man TT three times in a row (1986, 1987, and 1988). His most commonly used bike was the Loctite Yamaha.

Woodland retired from motor bike racing in 1991.

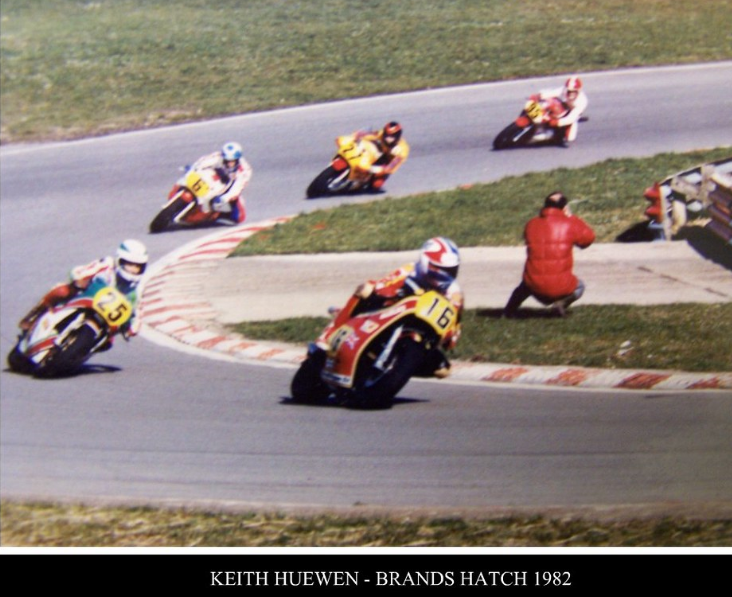
Brands Hatch 1982 - Barry Woodland & Keith Huwen
