= Carlos Lavado =

Venezuelan motorcycle racer

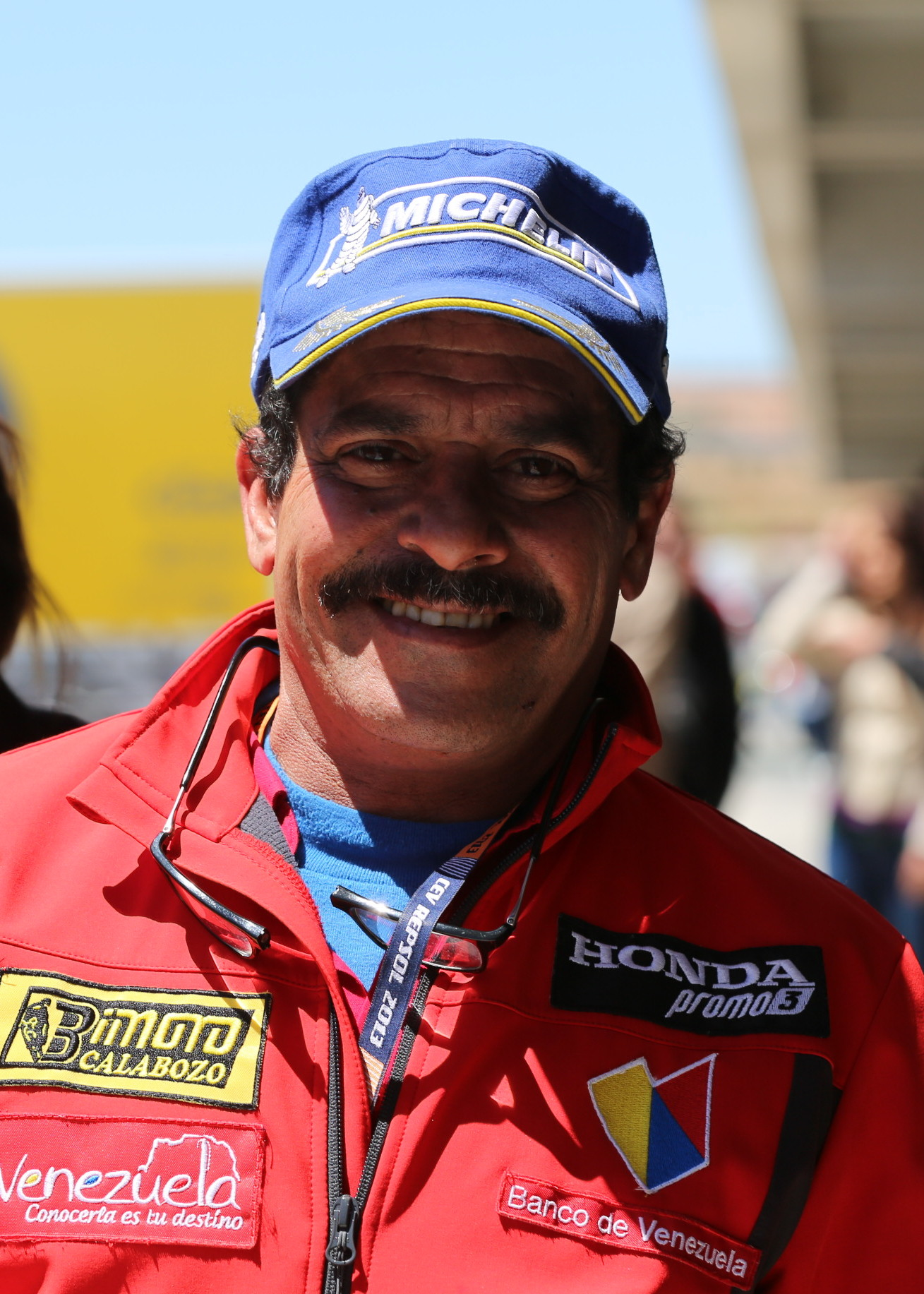
- Lavado in 2013
- Nationality: Venezuelan
Motorcycle racing career statistics
Grand Prix motorcycle racing
Active years	1978 - 1992
First race	1978 250cc Venezuelan Grand Prix
Last race	1992 250cc South African Grand Prix
First win	1979 350cc Venezuelan Grand Prix
Last win	1987 250cc Yugoslavian Grand Prix
Team	Yamaha
Championships	250cc - 1983, 1986
Starts / Wins / Podiums / Poles / F. laps / Points; 137 / 19 / 42 / 22 / 13

Carlos Alberto Lavado Jones (born May 25, 1956) is a Venezuelan former professional Grand Prix motorcycle racer. He competed in the FIM motorcycle Grand Prix world championships from 1978 to 1992. Lavado is notable for winning two 250cc road racing world championships in 1983 and 1986. He joins Johnny Cecotto as the only two Venezuelans to win Grand Prix World Championships.

== Motorcycle racing career ==
Born in Caracas, Venezuela, Lavado made his international racing debut in the 1978 Venezuelan Grand Prix, finishing second in the 250cc class. The following season, he won the 350cc class at the 1979 Venezuelan Grand Prix.

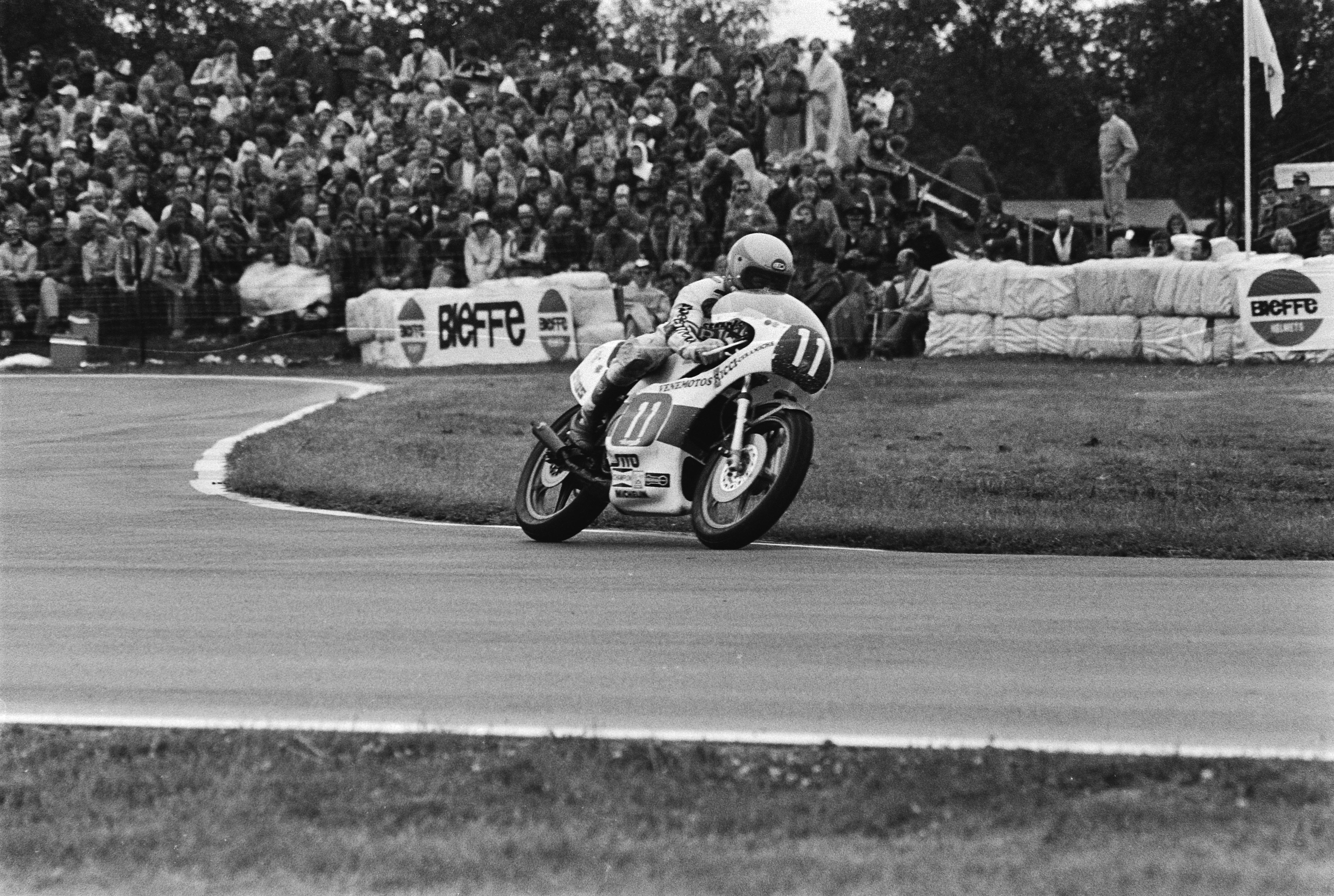
Lavado enroute to a victory at the 1980 250cc Dutch TT.

In 1980, Lavado began competing full-time on the Grand Prix circuit. He went on to win the 250cc World Championship in 1983 and repeated the feat in 1986, both times on a Yamaha TZ 250. At the 1983 Dutch TT, Lavado and Iván Palazzese finished in first and second place marking the first time that Venezuelan riders had claimed the top two places in a world championship Grand Prix race.

In fifteen seasons of Grand Prix competition (1978–1992), Lavado participated in 137 races, 125 of them in the 250cc division. He had 36 podium finishes and 17 victories in the 250cc class and 6 podium finishes with 2 victories in the 350cc division. After he retired from competition, he continued his involvement in Grand Prix racing serving as advisor to Venezuelan motorcycle racers Robertino Pietri and Gabriel Ramos.

== Motorcycle Grand Prix Results ==
Points system from 1969 to 1987:

**Position**	1	2	3	4	5	6	7	8	9	10
**Points**	15	12	10	8	6	5	4	3	2	1

Points system from 1988 to 1992:

**Position**	1	2	3	4	5	6	7	8	9	10	11	12	13	14	15
**Points**	20	17	15	13	11	10	9	8	7	6	5	4	3	2	1

(key) (Races in bold indicate pole position; races in italics indicate fastest lap)

Year	Class	Team	1	2	3	4	5	6	7	8	9	10	11	12	13	14	15	Points	Rank	Wins
1978	250cc	Yamaha	VEN; 2	ESP -	FRA -	NAT -	NED -	BEL -	SWE -	FIN -	GBR -	GER -	CZE -	YUG -				12	17th	0
1979	350cc	Yamaha	VEN; 1	AUT -	GER -	NAT -	ESP -	YUG -	NED -	FIN -	GBR -	CZE -	FRA -					15	14th	1
1980	250cc	Yamaha	NAT -	ESP; 9	FRA; 7	YUG; 4	NED; 1	BEL -	FIN -	GBR -	CZE -	GER -						29	6th	1
1980	350cc	Yamaha	NAT -		FRA -		NED; 5			GBR -	CZE; 9	GER -						8	13th	0
1981	250cc	Yamaha	ARG -		GER; 2	NAT -	FRA; 3	ESP; 3		NED; 2	BEL; 2	RSM -	GBR -	FIN -	SWE -	CZE -		56	4th	0
1981	350cc	Yamaha	ARG; 3	AUT; 5	GER -	NAT; 8			YUG; 3	NED; 2			GBR -			CZE -		41	5th	0
1982	250cc	Yamaha			FRA -	ESP; 1	NAT -	NED -	BEL -	YUG -	GBR; 8	SWE -	FIN; 5	CZE; 1	RSM -	GER -		39	5th	2
1982	350cc	Yamaha	ARG; 1	AUT -	FRA -		NAT; 2	NED -			GBR; 4		FIN -	CZE; 10		GER -		36	5th	1
1983	250cc	Yamaha	RSA; 7	FRA; Ret	NAT; 1	GER; 1	ESP; 7	AUT; 7	YUG; 1	**NED**; 1	BEL; 3	GBR; 4	SWE; 3					100	**1st**	4
1984	250cc	Yamaha	RSA; 9	NAT; 15	ESP; 3	AUT; 5	GER; 5	FRA; 2	YUG; Ret	**NED**; 1	BEL; Ret	GBR; 3	SWE; 7	**RSM**; 2				77	**3rd**	1
1985	250cc	Yamaha	**RSA**; 4	ESP; 1	GER; Ret	NAT; 2	AUT; 9	YUG; 2	**NED**; Ret	BEL; 2	FRA; 5	**GBR**; Ret	**SWE**; 2	**RSM**; 1				94	**3rd**	2
1986	250cc	Yamaha	ESP; 1	NAT; 2	**GER**; 1	**AUT**; 1	**YUG**; Ret	**NED**; 1	**BEL**; Ret	FRA; 1	**GBR**; 2	SWE; 1	**RSM**; Ret					114	**1st**	6
1987	250cc	Yamaha	JPN -	ESP; 10	GER; 6	NAT; 6	AUT; 8	**YUG**; 1	**NED**; 10	FRA; Ret	GBR; Ret	SWE; 4	CZE -	RSM -	POR; Ret	BRA; 5	ARG; 9	46	10th	1
1988	250cc	Yamaha	JPN; 13	USA; Ret	ESP; Ret	**EXP**; Ret	NAT; 7	GER; Ret	AUT; Ret	NED; Ret	BEL; 5	YUG -	FRA -	GBR; 8	SWE; Ret	CZE; 9	BRA; 2	55	11th	0
1989	250cc	Aprilia	JPN -	AUS -	USA -	ESP -	NAT -	GER -	AUT -	YUG -	NED; 10	BEL; 15	FRA; 18	GBR; 8	SWE; Ret	CZE; 9	BRA; 7	31	17th	0
1990	250cc	Aprilia	JPN; Ret	USA; 15	ESP; Ret	NAT; 11	GER; 12	AUT; Ret	YUG; 9	NED; 9	BEL; 4	FRA; Ret	GBR -	SWE -	CZE -	HUN -	AUS -	37	15th	0
1991	250cc	Yamaha	JPN; 25	AUS; 10	USA; 12	ESP; 11	ITA; 14	GER; 15	AUT; DNS	EUR	NED; 9	FRA; 16	GBR; 17	RSM; 7	CZE; DNQ	VDM	MAL	34	14th	0
1992	250cc	Gilera	JPN; Ret	AUS; 14	MAL; Ret	ESP; Ret	ITA; 12	EUR; Ret	GER; 13	NED; 9	HUN; 9	FRA; 20	GBR; 13	BRA; 14	RSA; 15			29	19th	0
