= Steve Parrish =

British motorcycle racer (born 1953)

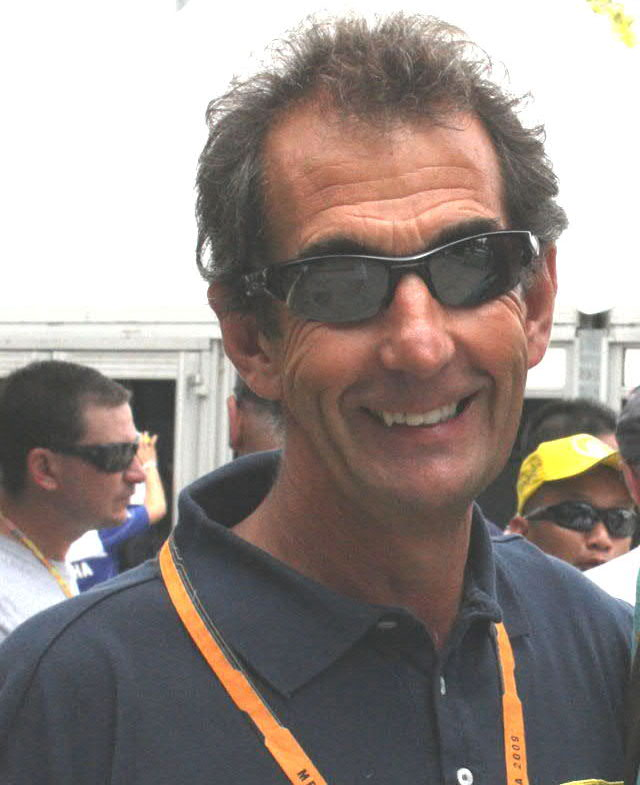
- Nationality: British
- Born: 24 February 1953 (age 73); Cambridge, England
Motorcycle racing career statistics
Grand Prix motorcycle racing
Active years	1977–1985
First race	1977 500cc Venezuelan Grand Prix
Last race	1985 500cc British Grand Prix
Team	Suzuki
Championships	0
Starts / Wins / Podiums / Poles / F. laps / Points; 52 / 0 / 1 / 0 / 1 / 92
Isle of Man TT career
TTs contested	8 (1975, 1977, 1981–1986)
TT wins	0
TT podiums	0

Stephen James Parrish (born 24 February 1953 in Cambridge, England) also known as "Stavros", is a British former professional motorcycle and truck racer, who is now a motorsport television commentator and speaker/entertainer.

== Racing career ==
Parrish turned professional at the age of 22 in 1976, winning the ACU Solo title in the British Motor Cycle Championship. He was a team mate to Barry Sheene on a Suzuki RG 500 in the 1977 500 cc world championship, finishing fifth overall, but returned to British-based riding to become the 1978 500cc ACU 'Gold Star' Champion. He also won the British Shell 500 title in both 1979 and 1980, and a British Superbike title in 1981.

=== Four wheel racing ===
==== Car racing ====
After retiring from motorcycle racing in 1986, Parrish briefly tried his luck in car racing, competing in the MG Metro Turbo Challenge and making a guest appearance in the 1988 Season.

Parrish raced in the short-lived Formula Classic series in 1995, peaking with a second place.

==== Truck racing ====
Parrish went on to become a successful truck racer, winning six British titles and five European titles between 1987 and 1996.

== Team management ==
Parrish also led a dual career both managing a successful Yamaha factory team to three British Superbike championship titles; and starting a successful truck racing career, winning the 1987 British Open Truck Racing Championship. Parrish took both the European and British Truck Racing championship titles in 1990, then held the British title for four years and retained the European title for three years driving for the BP–Mercedes-Benz team. Parrish regained the prestigious European crown again in 1996 in Jarama. The most successful truck racer ever, he retired in 2002 at the age of 47 to hand over to Terry Rymer.

== Commentary career ==
Parrish provides commentary and analysis for ITV's week-long coverage of the Isle of Man TT as well continuous commentary on Europsort and TNT Sports for Motorbike racing events including British Superbikes, MotoGP, World Superbikes.

In 1985, Parrish started commentating for the BBC radio, and then transferring to television with Sky with Barry Nutley. From 1990, he commentated on the British 125 championship for the BBC.

Parrish was previously co commentator on World Superbikes for the BBC with Leigh Diffey.

Parrish then teamed up with Charlie Cox commentating on MotoGP coverage, until the BBC lost its contract at the end of 2013. The pair had a rapport and commentated on a number of series for the BBC from the late 1990s, which were British and World Superbikes and MotoGP. A qualified pilot, Parrish is also a commentator for the Red Bull Air Race series for Channel 4.

== Other work and achievements ==
Away from television, he regularly tests various vehicles and racing machines, and is an expert witness for motor racing incidents. Parrish holds the Guinness Book of Records world record for the "Fastest Speed Achieved in Reverse" (85 mph) using a Caterham car.

With journalist and broadcaster Nick Harris, Parrish co-authored Barry: The Story of Motorcycling Legend Barry Sheene (2008), a biography of his former team mate Barry Sheene.

== Bibliography ==
- Parrish, Steve (24 May 2018). Parrish Times: My Life as a Racer. Orion Publishing Group. ISBN 978-1409169871.
