= Ángel Nieto =

Spanish motorcycle racer (1947–2017)

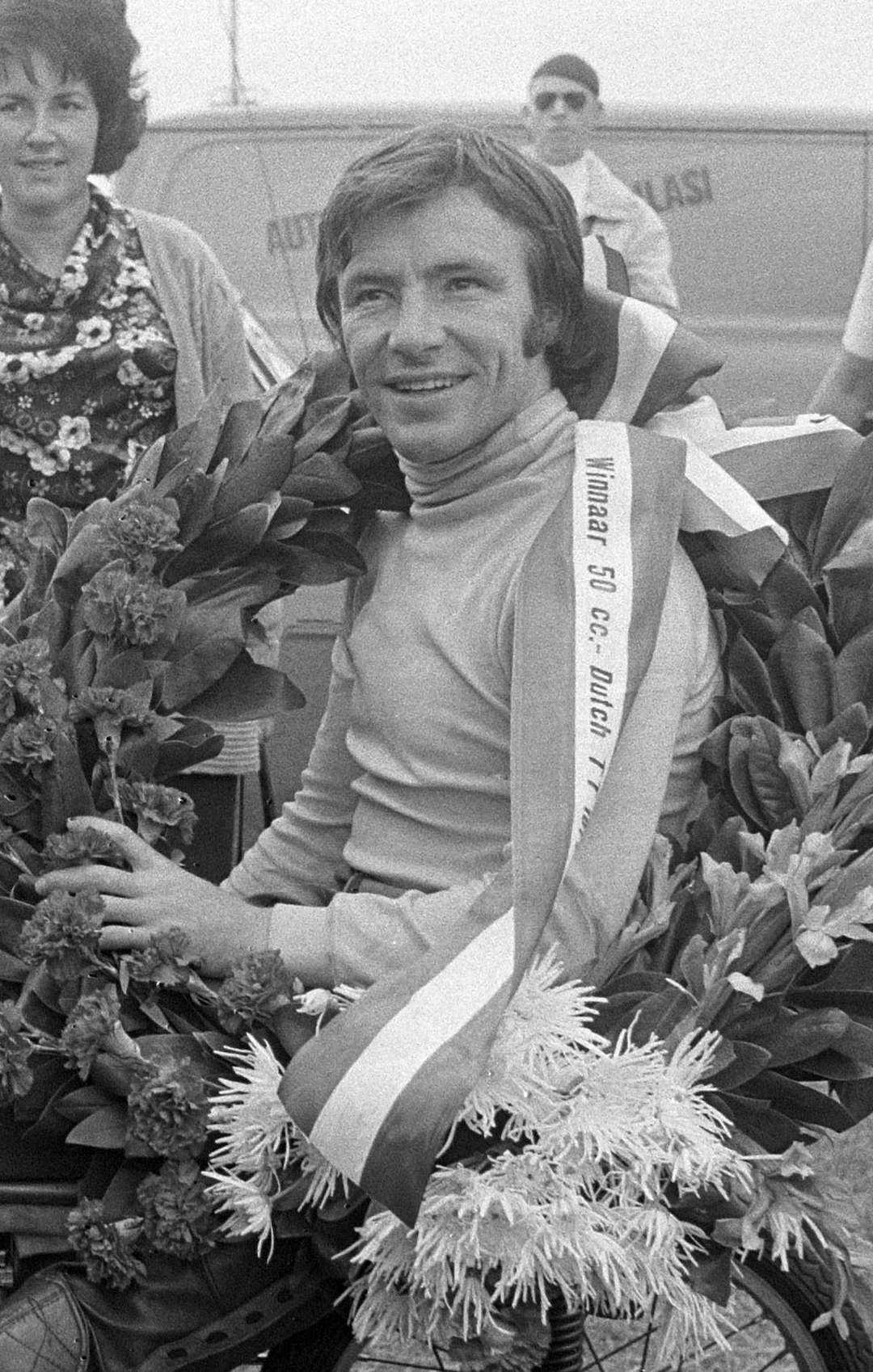
- Ángel Nieto in 1972
- Nationality: Spanish
- Born: 25 January 1947; Zamora, Spain
- Died: 3 August 2017 (aged 70); Ibiza, Spain
Motorcycle racing career statistics
Grand Prix motorcycle racing
Active years	1964 – 1986
First race	1964 50 cc Spanish Grand Prix
Last race	1986 80 cc Baden-Württemberg Grand Prix
First win	1969 50 cc German Grand Prix
Last win	1985 80 cc French Grand Prix
Team(s)	Derbi, Morbidelli, Kreidler, Bultaco, Minarelli, Garelli
Championships	50 cc – 1969, 1970, 1972, 1975–1977 125 cc – 1971, 1972, 1979, 1981–1984
Starts / Wins / Podiums / Poles / F. laps / Points; 186 / 90 / 139 / 34 / 81 / 1,782

Ángel Nieto Roldán (25 January 1947 – 3 August 2017) was a Spanish professional Grand Prix motorcycle racer. He was one of the most accomplished motorcycle racers in the history of the sport, winning 13 World Championships and 90 Grand Prix victories in a racing career that spanned twenty-three years from 1964 to 1986, mainly competing in 50cc, 80cc and 125cc displacement classes respectively. His total of 90 Grand Prix victories ranks him fourth only to Giacomo Agostini (122), Valentino Rossi (115) and Marc Márquez (106). In 2011, Nieto was named an FIM Legend for his motorcycling achievements.

== Motorcycle racing career ==
Nieto specialized in racing small displacement bikes such as in the 50 cc, 80 cc and 125 cc classes but many fellow racers, including former world champion Barry Sheene consider him among the greatest motorcycle racers of all time. Though he was never successful at the world level racing in the larger displacements, he won Spanish National Championships in the 50 cc, 125 cc, 250 cc, 500 cc and 750 cc classes. He retired in 1986 at the age of 39 with a total of 90 Grand Prix victories and 13 World Championships. Due to his triskaidekaphobia, he preferred to refer to his championship tally as "12+1".

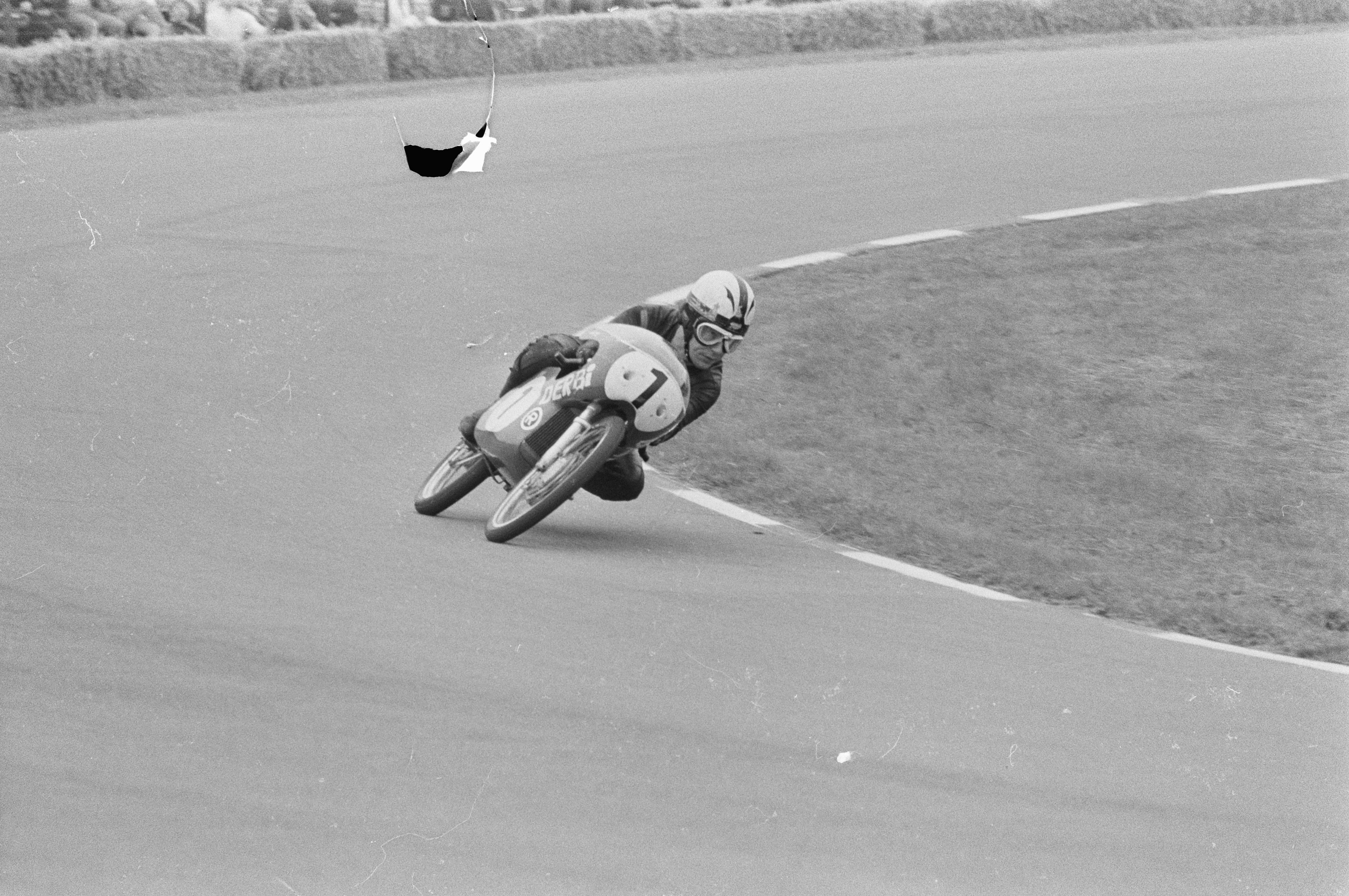
Nieto enroute to a victory at the 1971 50cc Dutch TT.

Later, Nieto operated a Grand Prix motorcycle racing team with two riders – his son, Ángel Nieto Jr. and Emilio Alzamora, who won the 125 cc title. He commentated on Grand Prix races for Spanish television. There is an Ángel Nieto museum in Madrid that displays some of his trophies and racing memorabilia. The FIM named him a Grand Prix "Legend" in 2000. Nieto attended the 2008 French Grand Prix at the Le Mans Bugatti Circuit on 18 May 2008, dressed to ride with a special shirt congratulating Valentino Rossi for equalling Nieto's 90 wins. Nieto mounted Rossi's bike, and Rossi as a passenger held a flag aloft with "90 + 90", as they took a victory lap.

== Personal life and death ==
Nieto had been living in Ibiza for many years. His two sons, Ángel Jr. and Pablo, both followed their father into motorcycle racing, as well as his nephew Fonsi Nieto.

On 26 July 2017, Nieto was hit by a car while driving his quad bike in Ibiza. He was taken to a hospital with a head trauma where he was put into a medically-induced coma and underwent surgery; his condition had been called "serious but not critical". On 3 August, his condition significantly worsened after being woken from his coma. He died the same day, aged 70.

== Nieto on the big screen ==
A documentary called Ángel Nieto: 12+1, directed by Álvaro Fernández Armero, was released in 2005. The film covers his entire career and a wide array of competitors, cyclists inspired by him and reporters who covered his career contribute their opinions and impressions regarding his fight to achieve and sustain his goal of world champion. The 1973 year, when Nieto raced with the 125 Morbidelli, is also recalled in the documentary Morbidelli – a story of men and fast motorcycles, released in 2014 and directed by Jeffrey Zani and Matthew Gonzales.

== Honours ==
- 1982: Knight Grand Cross in the Order of Civil Merit.
- 1993: Knight Grand Cross in the Royal Order of Sports Merit.

In 2018, the Circuito de Jerez, which has hosted the Spanish motorcycle Grand Prix since 1989, was officially renamed to Circuito de Jerez – Ángel Nieto.

== Complete Grand Prix motorcycle racing results ==
Points system from 1964 to 1968:

**Position**	1	2	3	4	5	6
**Points**	8	6	4	3	2	1

Points system from 1969 onwards:

**Position**	1	2	3	4	5	6	7	8	9	10
**Points**	15	12	10	8	6	5	4	3	2	1

(key) (Races in bold indicate pole position; races in italics indicate fastest lap)

Year	Class	Bike	1	2	3	4	5	6	7	8	9	10	11	12	13	14	Points	Rank	Wins
1964	50cc	Derbi	USA -	ESP; 5	FRA -	IOM -	NED -	BEL -	GER -	FIN -	JPN -						2	10th	0
1965	50cc	Derbi	USA -	GER; 5	ESP -	FRA -	IOM -	NED -	BEL -	JPN -							2	12th	0
1966	50cc	Derbi	ESP; 5	GER -	NED -	IOM -	NAT -	JPN -									3	6th	0
1967	50cc	Derbi	ESP; 6	GER -	FRA; 5	IOM -	NED; 2	BEL; 4	JPN -								12	4th	0
1968	50cc	Derbi	GER -	ESP; 2	IOM; Ret	NED -	BEL; 3										10	4th	0
1969	50cc	Derbi	ESP; 2	GER -	FRA; 2	NED -	BEL -	DDR; 1	CZE; 3	ULS; 1	NAT -	YUG; 2					**76**	**1st**	**2**
1970	50cc	Derbi	GER; 1	FRA; 1	YUG; 1		NED; 1	BEL; 2	DDR; 3	CZE -		ULS; 1	NAT -	ESP; 4			**87**	**1st**	**5**
1970	125cc	Derbi	GER -	FRA -	YUG; 2	IOM -	NED -	BEL; 1	DDR; 1	CZE -	FIN -		NAT; 1	ESP; 1			72	2nd	4
1971	50cc	Derbi	AUT; 2	GER; 3		NED; 1	BEL; 3	DDR; 1	CZE -	SWE; 1		NAT; 2	ESP -				69	2nd	3
1971	125cc	Derbi	AUT; 1	GER -	IOM -	NED; 1	BEL -	DDR; 1	CZE; 1	SWE -	FIN -	NAT; 2	ESP; 1				**87**	**1st**	**5**
1972	50cc	Derbi	GER; 2			NAT; 2		YUG; 2	NED; 1	BEL; 1	DDR -		SWE -		ESP; 1		**69**	**1st**	**3**
1972	125cc	Derbi	GER; DNS	FRA -	AUT; 1	NAT; 1	IOM -	YUG -	NED; 1	BEL; 1	DDR -	CZE -	SWE; 1	FIN; 2	ESP; 3		**97**	**1st**	**5**
1973	125cc	Morbidelli	FRA -	AUT; 3	GER; 2	NAT -	IOM -	YUG -	NED -	BEL; 2	CZE -	SWE -	FIN -	ESP; 2			46	7th	0
1974	125cc	Derbi	FRA -	GER -	**AUT**; 2	NAT; 1	NED -	**BEL**; 1	SWE -	CZE -	YUG; 2	ESP; 5					60	3rd	2
1975	50cc	Kreidler	ESP; 1	GER; 1	NAT; 1	NED; 1	BEL; 2	SWE; 2	FIN; 1	YUG; 1							**75**	**1st**	**6**
1976	50cc	Bultaco	FRA; Ret		NAT; 1	YUG -	NED; 1	BEL; 2	SWE; 1	FIN -	GER; 1	ESP; 1					**85**	**1st**	**5**
1976	125cc	Bultaco		AUT; 4	NAT; 3	YUG -	NED; 3	**BEL**; 1	SWE; 2	FIN -	GER -	**ESP**; 2					67	2nd	1
1977	50cc	Bultaco			GER; 3	NAT; 3	ESP; 1		YUG; 1	NED; 1	BEL; 3	SWE; 2					**87**	**1st**	**3**
1977	125cc	Bultaco	**VEN**; 1	AUT -	GER; 6	NAT; 5	ESP -	FRA -	YUG; 2	NED; 1	BEL; 2	SWE; 1	FIN -	GBR -			80	3rd	3
1978	50cc	Bultaco		ESP -			NAT -	NED -	BEL -				GER; 2	CZE -	YUG -		12	11th	0
1978	125cc	Bultaco	VEN -	ESP -	AUT -	FRA -	NAT; 7	NED -									88	2nd	4
1978	125cc	Minarelli							**BEL**; 2	SWE; 2	FIN; 1	GBR; 1	GER; 1		YUG; 1		88	2nd	4
1979	125cc	Minarelli	VEN; 1	**AUT**; 1	**GER**; 1	**NAT**; 1	**ESP**; 1	YUG; 1	NED; 1	BEL -	SWE -	FIN -	GBR; 1	CZE -	FRA -		**120**	**1st**	**8**
1980	125cc	Minarelli	NAT; 5	ESP -	FRA; 1	YUG -	NED; 1	BEL; 1	FIN; 1	GBR -	CZE -	GER; 2					78	3rd	4
1981	125cc	Minarelli	**ARG**; 1	AUT; 1	**GER**; 1	NAT; 4	FRA; 1	ESP; 1	YUG; Ret	**NED**; 1		SM; 2	GBR; 1	FIN; 1	SWE -		**140**	**1st**	**8**
1981	250cc	Siroco-Rotax	ARG -		GER; 5	NAT -	FRA -	ESP -		NED -	BEL -	RSM -	GBR -	FIN -	SWE -	CZE -	6	23rd	0
1982	125cc	Garelli	**ARG**; 1	AUT; 1	FRA -	ESP; 1	NAT; 1	NED; 1	BEL; 5	YUG; 3	**GBR**; 1	SWE; 6	FIN -	CZE -			**111**	**1st**	**6**
1983	125cc	Garelli		FRA; NC	**NAT**; 1	GER; 1	ESP; 1	AUT; 1	YUG; 11	NED; 1	BEL; 2	GBR; 1	SWE; DNQ	RSM; DNF			**102**	**1st**	**6**
1983	250cc	Yamaha	RSA -	FRA -	NAT -	GER -	ESP; NC	AUT; NC	YUG; NC	NED -	BEL -	GBR -	SWE -				0	–	0
1984	125cc	Garelli		NAT; 1	ESP; 1		GER; 1	FRA; 1		NED; 1		GBR; 1	SWE -	RSM; DNF			**90**	**1st**	**6**
1984	250cc	Garelli	RSA -	NAT; NC	ESP -	AUT -	GER -	FRA -	YUG -	NED -	BEL -	GBR -	SWE -	RSM -			0	–	0
1985	80cc	Derbi	ESP -	GER -	NAT -	YUG -	NED; NC	FRA; 1	RSM; NC								15	9th	1
1986	80cc	Derbi	ESP; 2	NAT; NC	GER; 4	AUT; 8	YUG; 4	NED; 4			GBR; NC	SWE -	RSM; 5	BWU; NC			45	7th	0
1986	125cc	Ducados	ESP -	NAT; 2	GER -	AUT -		NED; 10	BEL -	FRA; 9	GBR -	SWE -	RSM -	BWU -			15	13th	0
