= Eduardo Alemán =

Venezuelan racer

- Nationality: Venezuelan
Motorcycle racing career statistics
Grand Prix motorcycle racing
Active years	1977 - 1978, 1987 - 1989
First race	1977 350cc Venezuelan Grand Prix
Last race	1989 250cc Brazilian Grand Prix
Starts / Wins / Podiums / Poles / F. laps / Points; 7 / 0 / 0 / 0 / 0 / 2

Eduardo Alemán (born 1952) is a retired Venezuelan professional Grand Prix motorcycle road racer who competed in world championship racing in the late 1970s and 1980s.

Alemán first competed in the 1977 and 1978. He returned in the 1987 and raced until 1989.
