= Motori Minarelli =

Italian motorcycle engine manufacturer which was founded by Vittorio Minarelli

Motori Minarelli S.p.A.
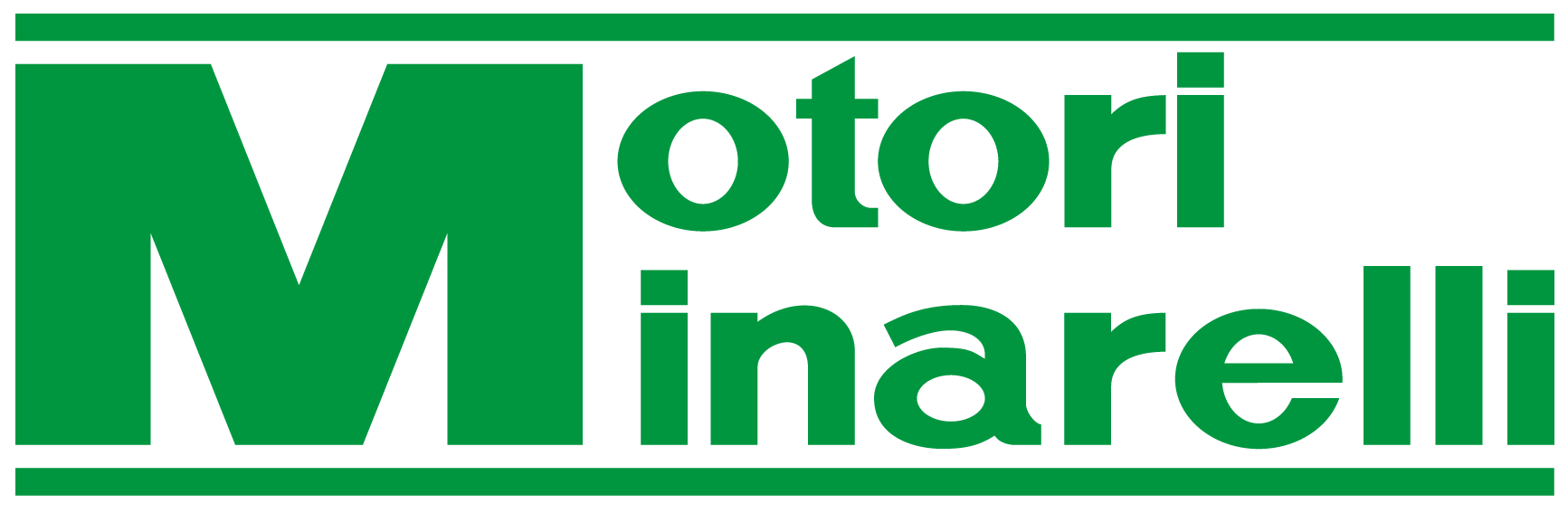
- Type: Subsidiary (S.p.A.)
- Industry: Automotive
- Founded: 1951
- Founder: Vittorio Minarelli; Franco Morini
- Headquarters: Calderara di Reno, Bologna, Italy
- Area served: Worldwide
- Products: Motorcycle engines
- Owner: Fantic Motor
- Parent: VeNetWork
- Website: https://motoriminarelli.it/en/home-eng/

Motori Minarelli is an Italian motorcycle engine manufacturer. It is part of the Fantic Motor group.

== History ==
Motori Minarelli was founded in Bologna in 1951 as a motorcycle manufacturer. In 1954 it also began to build mopeds. Two years later Minarelli switched exclusively to 2-stroke engine manufacture and a new 2000 square metre factory was constructed for these purposes. It employed 20 technical staff and produced 70 engines a day. These were sold to companies in Italy, other parts of Europe and South America.

In 1967 the company changed its name to Motori Minarelli and opened a new plant in Calderara di Reno. By the 1970s engine production had reached 250,000 units a year. The company also entered motorcycle racing and won a number of titles.

In 1990 the company began a business relationship with Yamaha. Five years later it employed 350 people and engine production had reached 450,000 units a year. In 2002, following changes in the world motorcycle market, Motori Minarelli became a member of the Yamaha Group.

In 2020 Fantic Motor acquired 100% of the shares from Yamaha.

With Fantic ownership, motor production is also accompanied by the production of mopeds and scooters with the Issimo and Issimo City models. In June 2023, Yamaha Motor Europe commissioned Minarelli to produce 10,000 Yamaha Booster e-bikes, derived from the Fantic Issimo models.

== Products ==
Minarelli produces two-stroke and four-stroke internal combustion engines with a high technological content, for motorcycle application. The engines are:

Minarelli 660 (Aprilia Pegaso, yamaha xt)

- Minarelli MM 460 4T: 460 cc four-stroke
- Minarelli MM 300 2T: 300 cc two-stroke.
- Minarelli MM 125 4T: 125 cc four-stroke.
- Minarelli AM6 50 2T: 50 cc two-stroke.

== Gallery ==
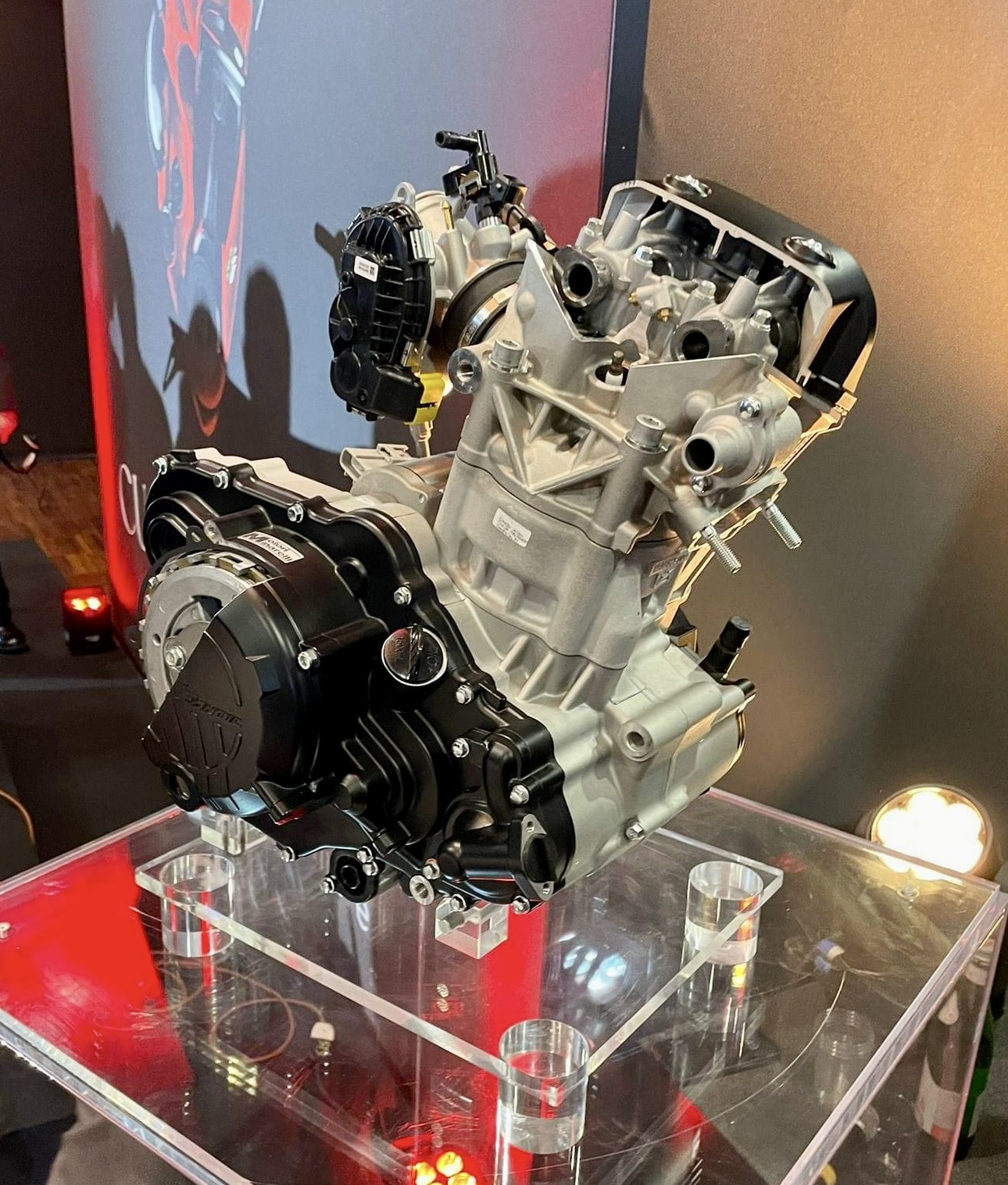
Minarelli MM 460

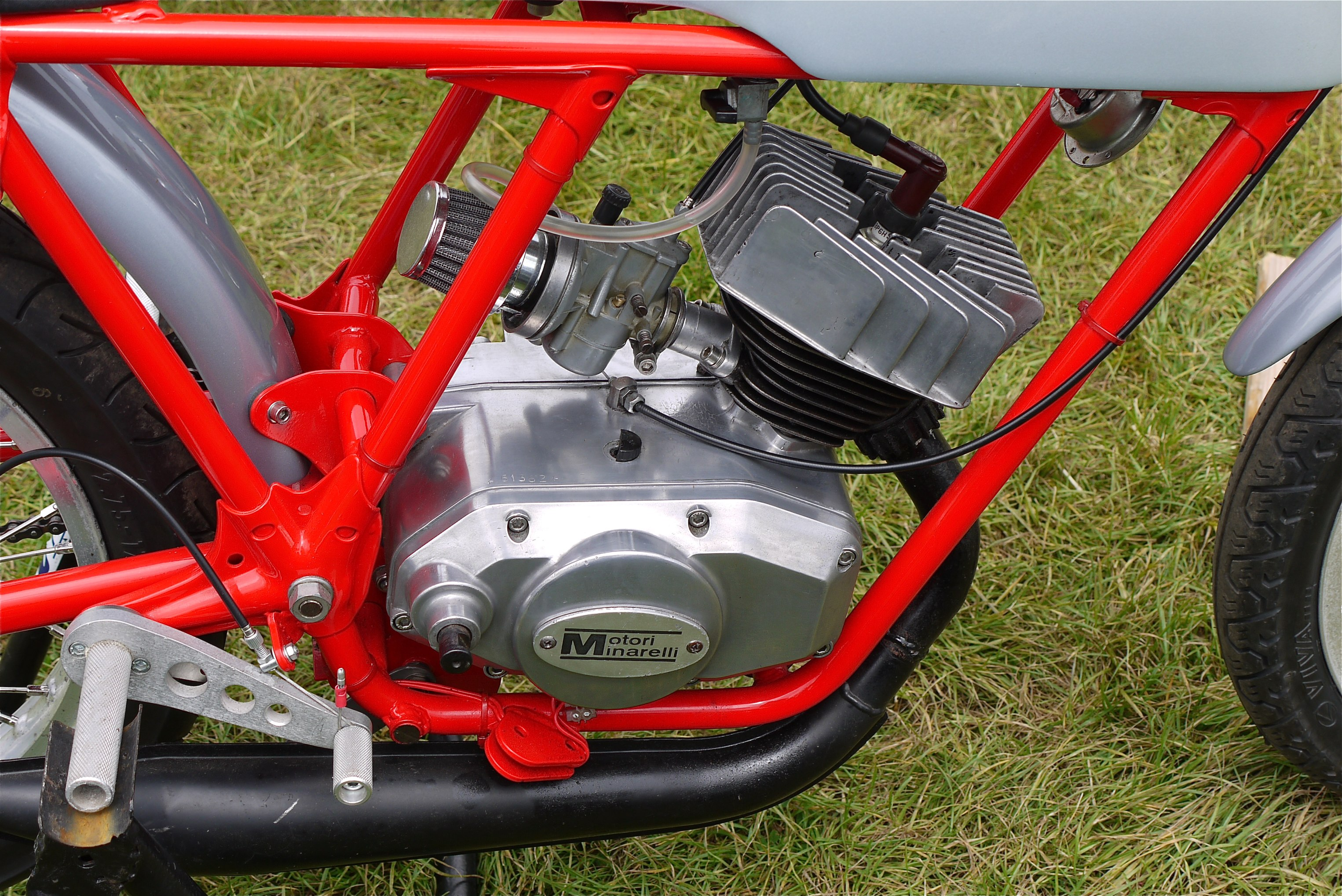
1975 Minarelli P6 50cc

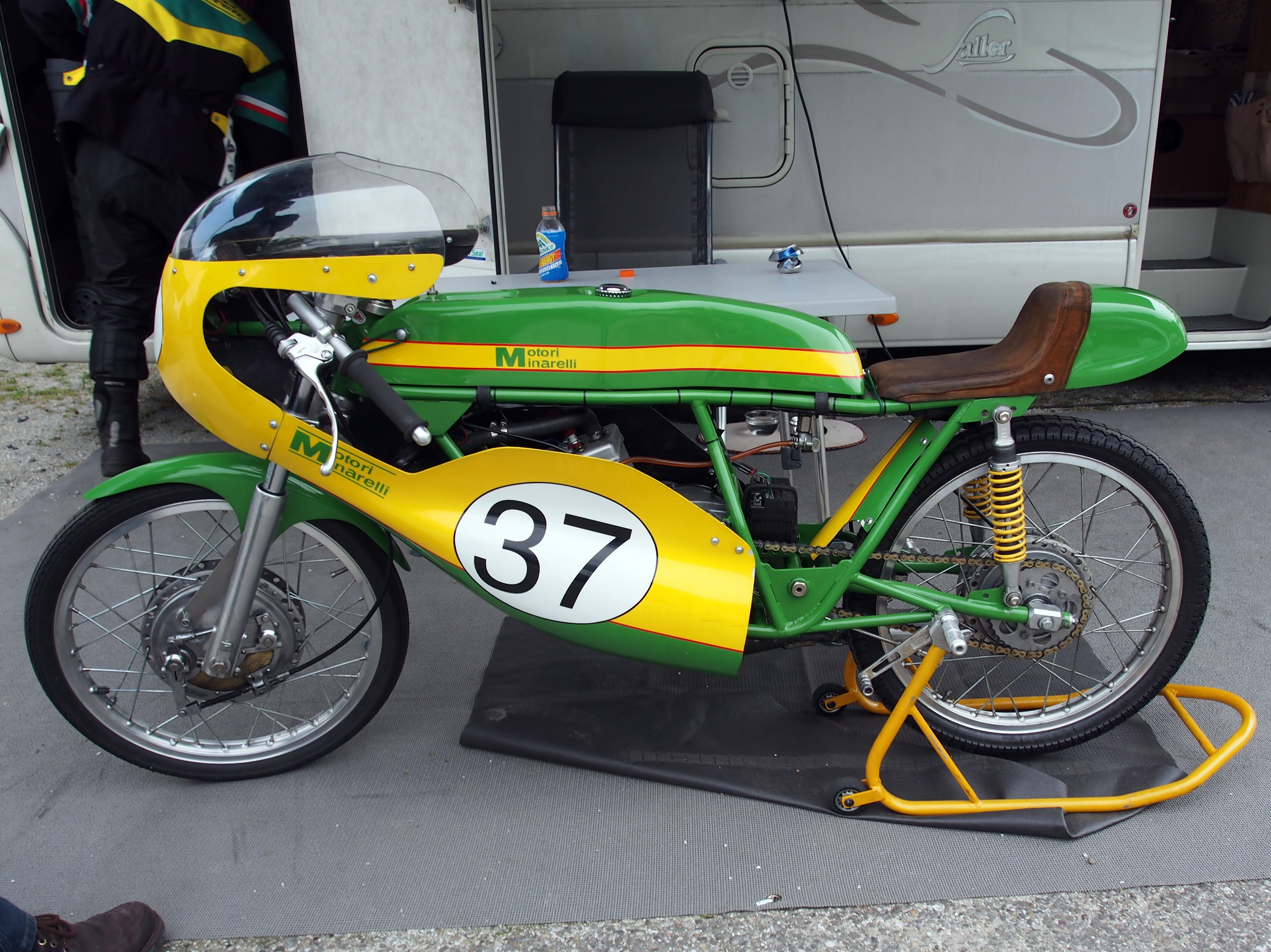
Minarelli 50cc Grand Prix motorcycle racing bike
