= Gilera =

Italian motorcycle manufacturer

- Type: Subsidiary
- Industry: Motorcycle and Scooter
- Founded: 1909; 117 years ago, Milan
- Founder: Giuseppe Gilera
- Defunct: 2020; 6 years ago
- Headquarters: Pontedera, Italy
- Area served: Worldwide
- Parent: Piaggio
- Website: gilera.com

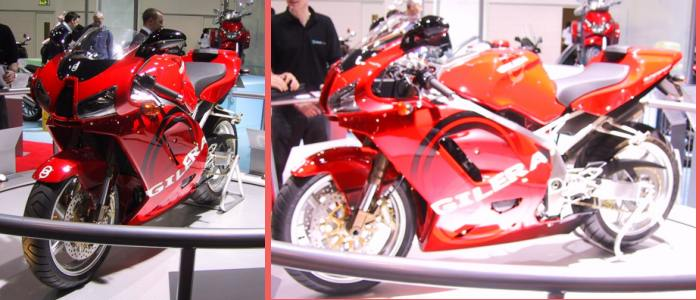
Gilera 600 SuperSport

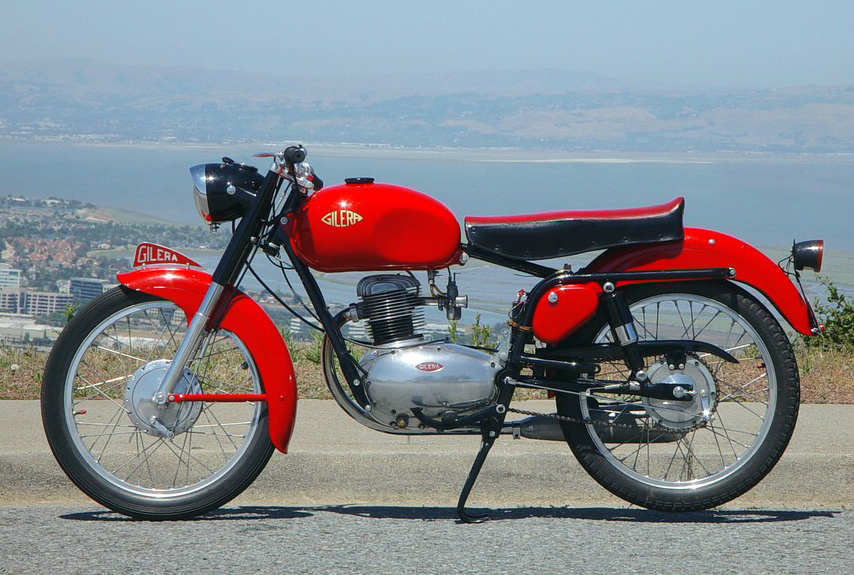
1954 Gilera 150 Sport

Gilera is an Italian motorcycle manufacturer founded in Arcore in 1909 by Giuseppe Gilera (1887–1971). In 1969, the company was purchased by Piaggio.

== History ==
Giuseppe Gilera founded his self-named motorcycle company in 1909 (aged 22) near Milan, Italy. His first model used a 317cc single-cylinder overhead-valve engine (67x90mm bore/stroke) with a single-speed belt drive in a simple open frame with the engine as a stressed member of the frame, and no suspension. It produced 7 hp, weighed 75 kg, and had a top speed of 105 km/h (65 mph).

Gilera subsequently produced a series of V-twins and single-cylinder models with sidevalve, F-head, and overhead-valve configurations. After WW1, the factory was moved to Arcore, between Milan and Lecco, very near the Monza racing circuit. Racing was always a focus for the brand, with Giusseppe's brother Luigi a successful ISDT participant in the early 1930s. After withdrawing from competition in 1957, Gilera changed direction abruptly. They downplayed their hitherto successful line of four-stroke singles and began to focus on motocross and off-road events in association with independent specialist Elmeca. Sales declined through the 1960s and by 1968 the company was in receivership.

In 1969, Gilera became part of the Piaggio group. In 1992, Gilera made a return to the Grand Prix arena and Piaggio continues to produce small-displacement motorcycles with the Gilera name. The famous factory of Arcore was closed in 1993 and now the motorcycles (only scooters) bearing the name Gilera are produced by Piaggio in Pontedera.

== Racing history ==
In 1935, Gilera acquired rights to the CNA Rondine. It had double-over-head camshafts, forced-inducting supercharger and was water-cooled, producing 60 kW (80 hp)@9000 and had a top speed of 140 mph (230 km/h). This formed the basis for Gilera' s racing machines for nearly forty years. From the mid-thirties, Gilera developed a range of four-stroke engine machines. The engines ranged from 100 to 500 cc, the most famous being the 1939 Saturno. Designed by Giuseppe Salmaggi, the Saturno was inspired by the pre-war Gilera VTEGS 500 cc "Otto Bulloni" yet was quite different due to its unit construction.

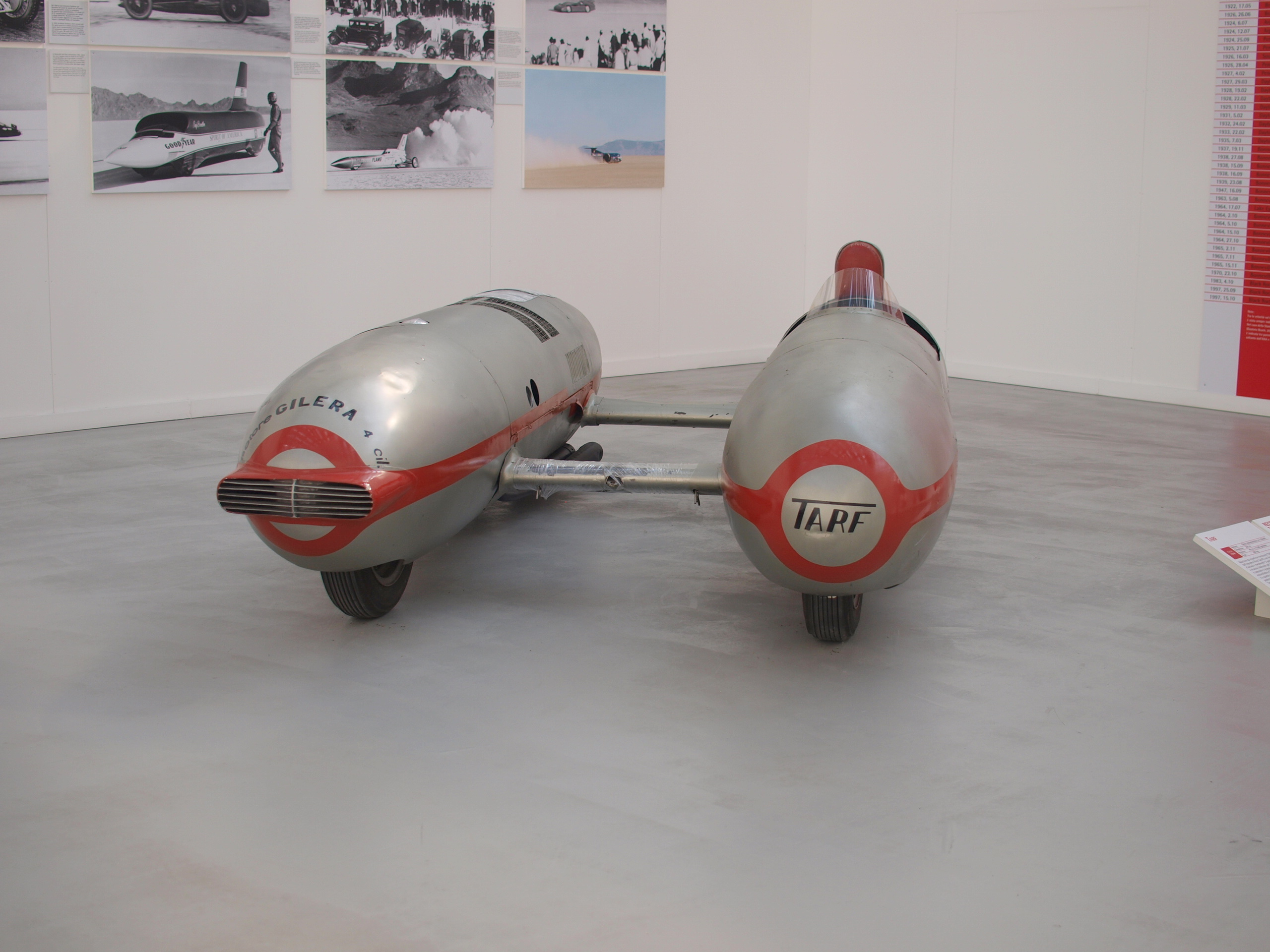
Twin-torpedo bodied Gilera TARF I (late 1940s - early 1950s)

After World War II, Gilera dominated Grand Prix motorcycle racing, winning the 500 cc road racing world championship six times in eight years. Facing a downturn in motorcycle sales due to the increase in the popularity of automobiles after the war, Gilera made a gentleman's agreement with the other Italian motorcycle makers to quit Grand Prix racing after the 1957 season as a cost-cutting measure.

The 1957 500 cc machines on which former World Champion rider Geoff Duke had much success were resurrected in 1963, but with the benefit of newer, upgraded Tyre technology of the 1960s were considered still competitive. The team was devised by Duke to challenge the domination of Mike Hailwood on the MV and had early successes with riders Derek Minter and teammate John Hartle at Silverstone, Brands Hatch and Imola, Italy.

In May 1963, Minter suffered serious injuries when racing a Norton at Brands Hatch, and his place in the team for the TT races was taken by Phil Read, who came third to second-place teammate Hartle. The team only raced for one season in selected races.

In 1966, Minter arranged to ride the Gileras at the TT in June, again without success as he crashed on a wet road surface after a rain shower at Brandish Corner during the last practice before race-week, breaking his left wrist which ended his racing for the rest of the race season. The bikes were raced at Brands Hatch later in the year.

The four-cylinder Gilera engine was also used successfully for world championship sidecar races. Eight victories in the sidecar class, as well as four runners-up in the world championship from 1949 to 1952 (three times Ercole Frigerio and one Albino Milani), showed the potential of the engine. In 1954, the Gilera four-cylinder was used by Piero Taruffi for the record-breaking TARF vehicle. (Note: The TARF was initially powered by a Moto Guzzi 500 two-cylinder engine, which was subsequently replaced with Gilera 350 cc, 500 cc and 550 cc four-cylinder designs.) The Swiss driver Florian Camathias won a sidecar race with a Gilera four-cylinder engine for the last time in 1964.

=== European championships ===
Year	Class	Rider
1939	500 cc	(Kingdom of Italy) Dorino Serafini

=== MotoGP World Championship ===
Gilera won the following World Titles:

- 500 cc class:

Year	Class	Rider
1950	500 cc	(Italy) Umberto Masetti
1952	500 cc	(Italy) Umberto Masetti
1953	500 cc	(United Kingdom) Geoff Duke
1954	500 cc	(United Kingdom) Geoff Duke
1955	500 cc	(United Kingdom) Geoff Duke
1957	500 cc	(Italy) Libero Liberati

- 250 cc class:

Year	Class	Rider
2008	250 cc	(Italy) Marco Simoncelli

- 125 cc class:

Year	Class	Rider
2001	125 cc	(San Marino) Manuel Poggiali

=== MotoGP World Constructors champions ===
- 500 cc class
  - 1952, 1953, 1955, 1957

=== Isle of Man Tourist Trophy ===
- 350 cc class

Year	Champion	Class	Motorcycle
1957 Isle of Man TT	(United Kingdom) Bob McIntyre	Class 350 cc	

- 500 cc class

Year	Champion	Class	Motorcycle
1955 Isle of Man TT	(United Kingdom) Geoff Duke	Class 500 cc	
1957 Isle of Man TT	(United Kingdom) Bob McIntyre	Class 500 cc	
1963 Isle of Man TT	(United Kingdom) John Hartle; Second	Class 500 cc	Team Scuderia Duke Gilera
1963 Isle of Man TT	(United Kingdom) Phil Read; Third	Class 500 cc	Team Scuderia Duke Gilera

== Motorcycles ==
=== Racing motorcycles ===
Model	Engine	Years	Notes	Image
Gilera 500 Rondine		()		
Gilera 5004C		()		Gilera 5004C (1957)
Gilera GFR 250		()		
Gilera RSA 250		()		Gilera RSA 250, 2008, Marco Simoncelli.

=== Historic ===
Model	Engine	Years	Notes	Image
500 LTE		()	Produced during World War II for the Italian army.	1939, Gilera 500 LTE
Marte		()	Produced during World War II for the Italian army, the Marte was a 498 cc (30.4 cu in) OHV single with 14 bhp (10 kW). Intended for use with a sidecar, the Marte had a shaft drive and hand-operated transmission.	
Saturno		()	Produced after World War II until 1959 as a 498 cc (30.4 cu in) OHV single with 22 bhp (16 kW) @ 5,000 rpm and swinging-arm rear suspension using parallel, twin horizontal coil springs. The racing version designated Saturno San Remo was campaigned with success in Italian national and international races but was unable to compete with the multi-cylinder and overhead camshaft opposition.	1947 Gilera Saturno.

=== Modern ===
Model	Engine	Years	Notes	Image
RV	124,3 cc, Single, Two-stroke engine, Reed valve, liquid cooling	(1984–1987)		
RX	124,3 cc, Single, Two-stroke engine, Reed valve, liquid cooling	(1984-)		
KK	124,38 cc, Single, Two-stroke engine, Reed valve, liquid cooling	(1986–1987)		
KZ	124,38 cc, Single, Two-stroke engine, Reed valve, liquid cooling	(1986–1987)		Gilera KZ
Saturno Bialbero 500		(1987–1991)	Produced from the late 1980s as a modern version of the historic Saturno using a 491 cc DOHC engine with 45 bhp @ 7,500 rpm	1989, Gilera Saturno Bialbero 500
XR1	124,3 cc, Single, Two-stroke engine, Reed valve, liquid cooling	(1988–1989)		
MX1 / MXR	124,38 cc, Single, Two-stroke engine, Reed valve, liquid cooling	(1988–1990)		Gilera MX1
SP 01 / SP 02	124,38 cc, Single, Two-stroke engine, Reed valve, liquid cooling	(1988–1991)		Gilera SP 01
RC 600		(1989–1994)		
Nordwest 600		(1991–1994)		
Freestyle 125	124,38 cc, Single, Two-stroke engine, Reed valve, liquid cooling	(1991–1994)		Freestyle 125
CX	124,38 cc, Single, Two-stroke engine, Reed valve, liquid cooling	(1991–1993)		1991 Gilera 125 CX
Crono	124,38 cc, Single, Two-stroke engine, Reed valve, liquid cooling	(1991–1992)		Gilera Crono
GFR		(1993–1994)		
DNA		(1996–2009)		
Runner		(1997–2020)		
Nexus		(2003–2012)		
GP800		(2006–2013)		Gilera GP800
Fuoco		(2007–2017)		Gilera Fuoco
Ice		(2001–2003)		

=== Moped ===
Model	Engine	Years	Notes	Image
Eco / EC1 / Città		(1979–1989)	(moped)	Gilera Città
Stalker		(1996–2012)	(also known as SKP)	Gilera Stalker
SMT / RCR		(2003–2020)		Gilera RCR Gilera SMT

== See also ==
- List of Italian companies
- List of motorcycle manufacturers
