= Cagiva Mito =

Two-stroke sports motorcycle

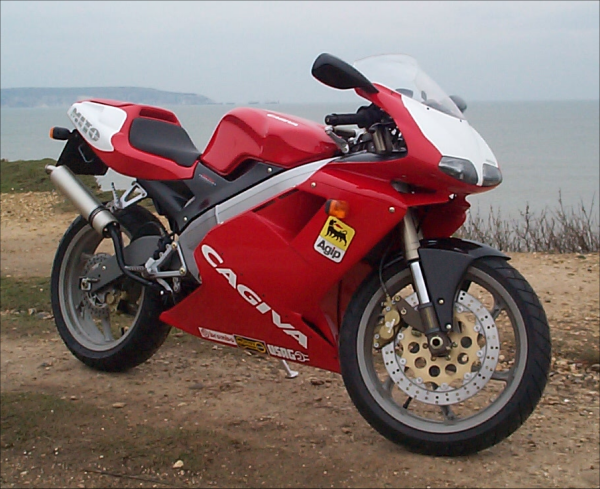
- 2001 Cagiva Mito Evolution II
- Manufacturer: Cagiva
- Production: 1989–2012
- Class: Sport bike
- Engine: 124.63 cc (7.605 cu in), liquid-cooled, two-stroke single, 28mm Dell'Orto PHBH 28 BD Carburettor
- Bore / stroke: 56.0 mm × 50.6 mm (2.20 in × 1.99 in)
- Compression ratio: 7.1:1 (closed port)
- Ignition type: Electronic, C.D.I
- Transmission: 6-speed manual, Wet multi-disc cable-actuated clutch
- Frame type: Aluminum double extruded beam with cast head pipe and cast rear plates
- Suspension: Front: Marzocchi Ø40 mm inverted forks Rear: Sachs progressive monoshock, adjustable preload Steering damper: Transverse linear
- Brakes: Front: Single Ø320 mm hydraulic floating disc, Brembo 4 piston caliper Rear: Ø230 mm hydraulic disc, Brembo single piston caliper
- Tires: Front: 110/70 ZR 17; Rear: 150/60 ZR 17
- Rake, trail: 25 °, 98 mm (3.9 in)
- Wheelbase: 1,375 mm (54.1 in)
- Dimensions: L: 1,980 mm (78 in); W: 760 mm (30 in) [w/mirrors] H: 1,100 mm (43 in)
- Seat height: 760 mm (30 in)
- Weight: 129 kg (284 lb) (dry)
- Fuel capacity: 14 L (3.1 imp gal; 3.7 US gal)

The Cagiva Mito (English: Myth) is a small-engined Cagiva sports motorcycle. The powerplant consists of a two-stroke 125 cubic centimetres (7.6 cu in) single-cylinder engine.

== History and development ==
The Cagiva Mito was the first bike of Valentino Rossi, eventual 9 time MotoGP world champion. In 1994, Rossi had been provided a factory Mito by Cagiva team manager Claudio Lusuardi and cruised to the Italian title.

During the 1990s the Mito was the arch-rival to Aprilia's AF1 125 Futura and later the RS125, a similar 2-stroke 125 cc race-replica.

In 2012, production of new Mitos was suspended. Increasingly stringent environmental emission requirements and the concentration of resources on MV Agusta's F3 were cited as reasons. The last few Mito SP525s produced were white in colour, and personally signed by MV Agusta CEO Giovanni Castiglioni.

== Models ==
=== Mk I/II and SP ===
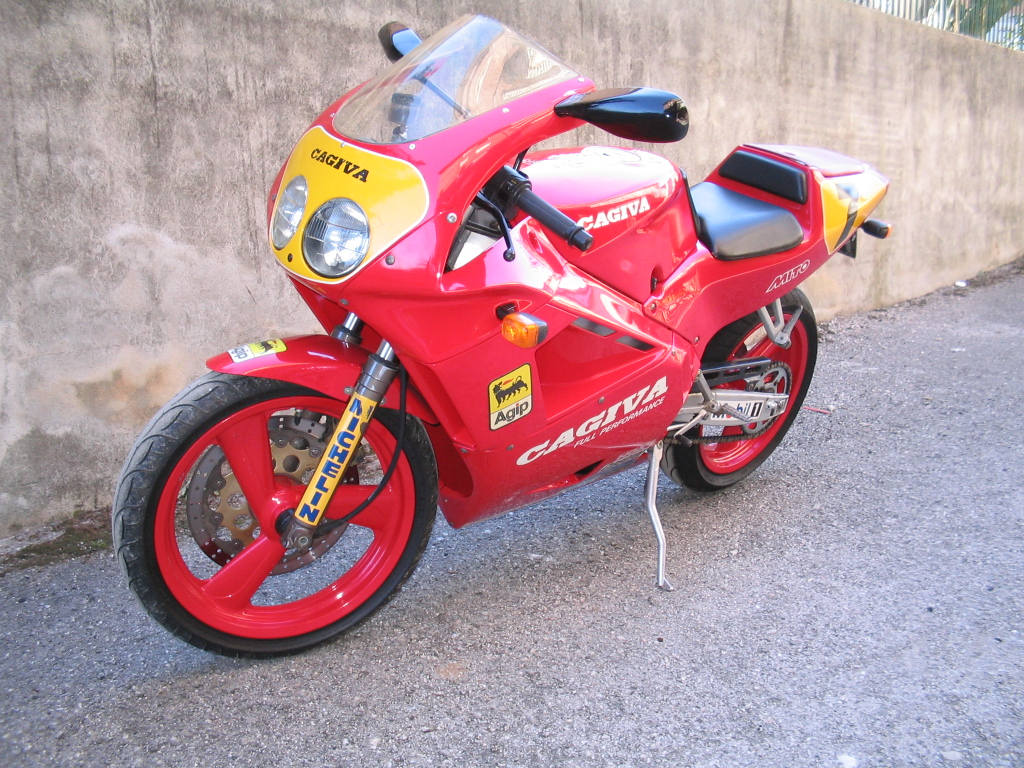
1992 Cagiva Mito Mk II

The Mito was introduced in 1989 as the Mk I. The Mk II followed with minor changes such as upside down forks and a new front mudguard. The SP versions featured Marchesini rims and uprated suspension.

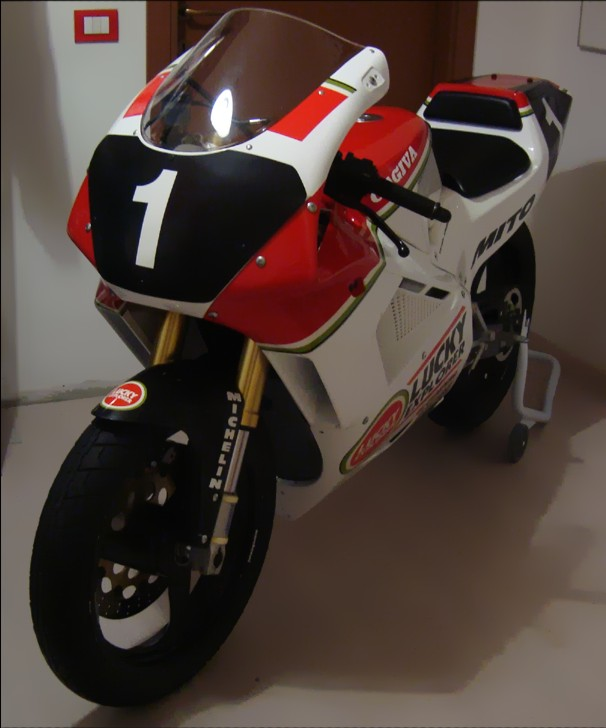
Cagiva Mito SP

The SP models also featured different engine and ignition parts.

=== Evolution I and II ===
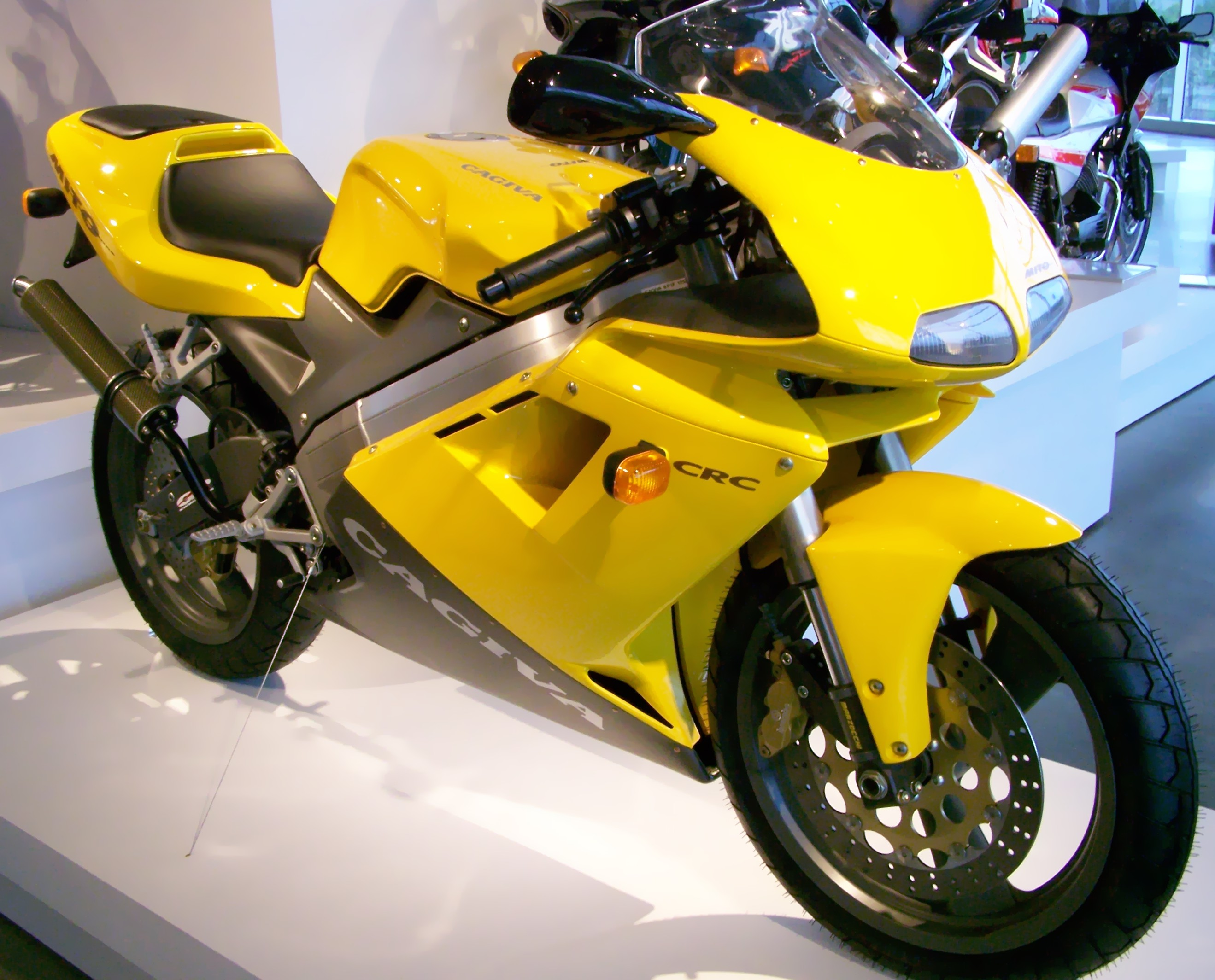
1995 Cagiva Mito Evolution I

In 1994 the bike was restyled by Massimo Tamburini with similar lines to the then new Ducati 916, a design he also penned. The similarity is particularly visible in the front and rear fairings.

The Evo I is identified by Grimeca 3-spoke die-cast Aluminium alloy rims and a 7 speed gearbox, grey lower panels, solid colours on the tail section.

The Evo II is identified by Grimeca 6-spoke die-cast Aluminium alloy rims and a 6 speed gearbox, solid colour lower panels, white area on the tail section.

In February 2007, Malaysian company MOFAZ announced that they will be locally assembling the last batch of the Mito 125 Evolution for Malaysian buyers. The bike will be known as the Momos Cagiva Mito 125 Fauzy's Edition and only 300 will be made for the production run.

In late 2009 Cagiva dropped the Evolution model, leaving just the Mito SP525 and Raptor 125 in the lineup.

=== SP525 ===
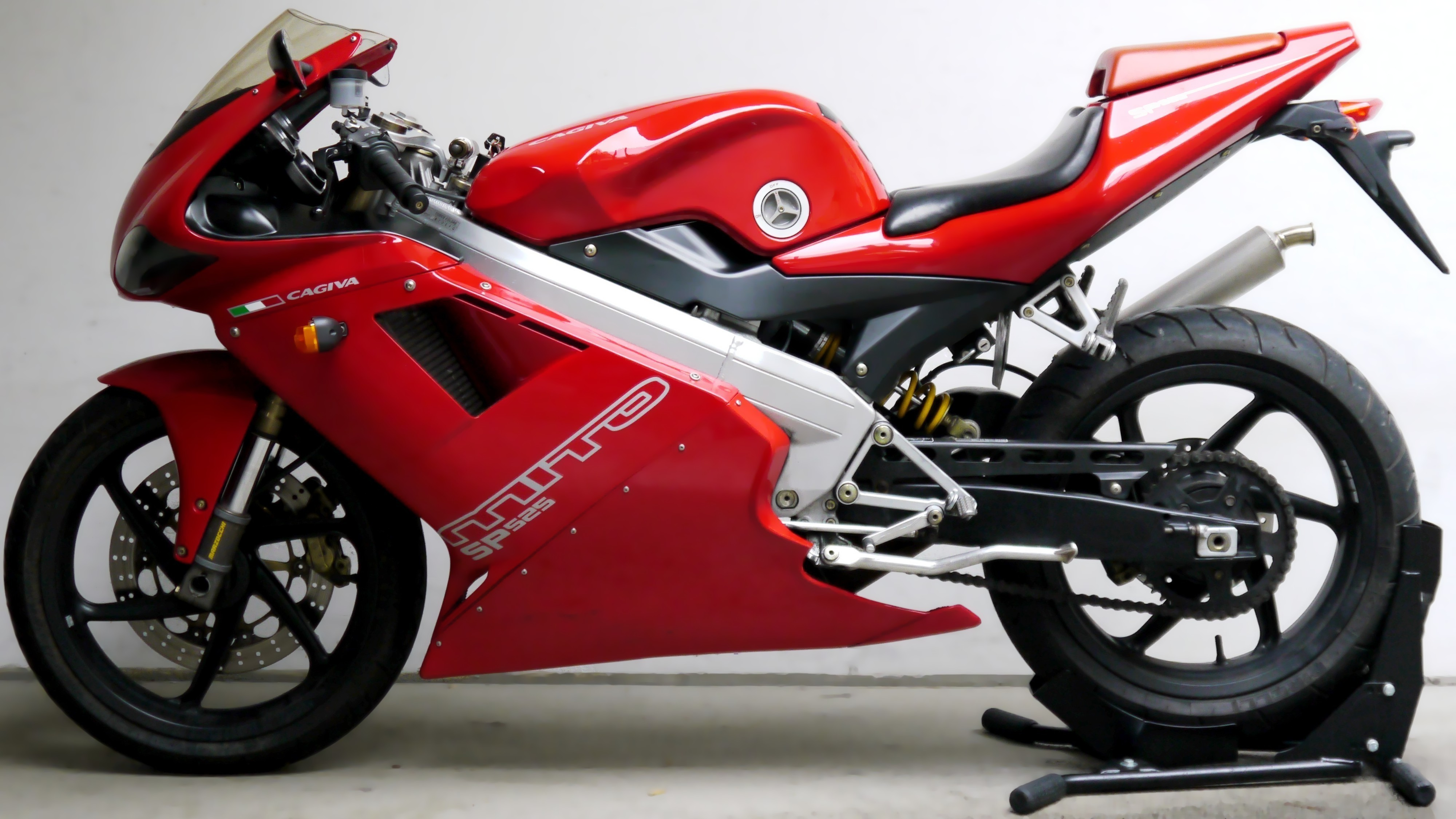
Cagiva Mito SP525

In 2005, at the EICMA motorcycle show, Cagiva launched a limited production tuned competition version of the Mito known as the SP525. This is something of a homage to the Cagiva GP500 (C594) racing bike. Front and rear fairings were modified to look more like the C594, eight-spoke forged aluminium wheels were added, while speedometer, lights and mirrors were removed to reduce the overall weight. The bike produces greater than 39 hp at the crank, and is not road-legal.

For 2008, Cagiva added the Mito SP525 road bike (not to be confused with the racing SP525 above) alongside the Mito Evo II. In terms of looks, the new bike inherits some stylistic traits from the competition SP525, essentially similar front and rear fairings.

On a technical level, the bike retains much the same rolling chassis as the Evo and the engine is still a 125 cc two-stroke, but has had several changes, notably a new Electronic Carburetion System (developed in conjunction with Dell'Orto) governing both fuel-air, oil-mix and ignition, allowing it to pass tougher Euro 3 emissions regulations.

=== Mito 500 ===
In November 2006 at EICMA, Cagiva unveiled the Mito 500 concept bike. The two-stroke 125 cc engine has been replaced with a fuel-injected, four-stroke four-valve 500 cubic centimetres (31 cu in) DOHC single from the Husqvarna TE510, producing 60 hp and 50 Nm. Replacing the two-stroke's expansion chamber exhaust is a tiny, seemingly unbaffled system, its exit just visible at the rear of the underside fairing. It features bodywork from the Evolution in white, 8-spoke Marvic forged aluminium wheels from the competition SP525, and weighs 133 kilograms (293 lb) (dry) - just 4 kilograms (8.8 lb) more than the Mito 125. An updated prototype was revealed in 2008, with bodywork from the road SP525 in red/silver, a radial Brembo front caliper and radial master cylinder, and a revised exhaust. Despite much interest, the Mito 500 never entered production.

== Naked variants ==
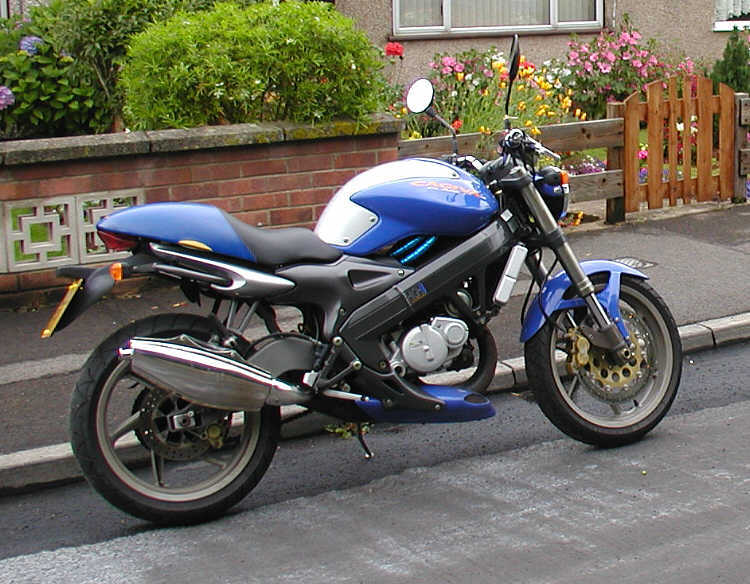
Cagiva Planet

=== Planet ===
In 1998, Cagiva added a naked equivalent to the Mito Evo, named the Planet which bears some resemblance to the Ducati Monster. The Planet, unlike the Aprilia Tuono, has been given all new fairings including a fuel tank which can hinge upwards allowing access for space to store an open face helmet.

=== Raptor 125 ===
In 2003, Cagiva discontinued the Planet and renamed the particular motorcycle in 2004 as the Raptor 125 which is essentially the same however with changes to the appearance.

== Performance ==
- Maximum Power:

Evolution - 24.5 kW (33 hp) @12,000 rpm
Mito SP 525 ('09) - 18 kW (24 hp) @12,000 rpm
Mito 500 - 60 hp
