= Cagiva =

Italian motorcycle manufacturer

Coordinates: 45.8035942°N 8.7782452°E

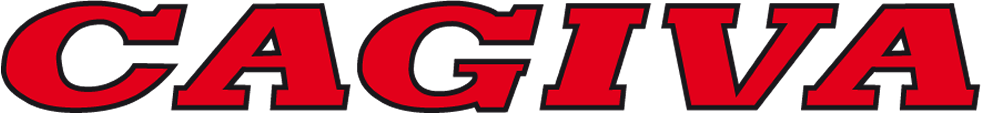
- Type: Subsidiary
- Industry: Motorcycle manufacturing
- Predecessor: Aermacchi Harley-Davidson
- Founded: 1950; 76 years ago (Motorcycle: 1978)
- Founder: Giovanni Castiglioni
- Defunct: 2012
- Fate: Merged in MV Agusta
- Headquarters: Varese, Italy
- Area served: Worldwide
- Key people: Claudio and Gianfranco Castiglioni
- Products: Motorcycle
- Parent: MV Agusta
- Subsidiaries: Ducati (1985–1996); Moto Morini (1987–1996); Husqvarna Motorcycles (1987–2007)
- Website: www.cagiva.it

Cagiva is an Italian motorcycle manufacturer. It was founded in 1950 by Giovanni Castiglioni in Varese, originally producing small metal components. Giovanni's sons, Claudio and Gianfranco Castiglioni, went into the motorcycle industry in 1978. The name is a portmanteau derived from the founder's name "Giovanni Castiglioni" and the founding location, i.e. Castiglioni Giovanni Varese.

In its history, Cagiva won races in Dakar and Motocross competitions, as well as in Grand Prix motorcycle racing.

== History ==
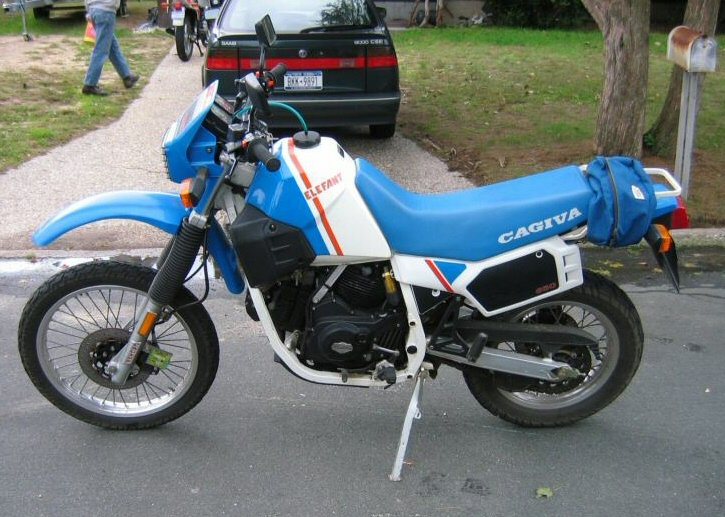
Cagiva Elefant 650 Ligier Export, 1986, a dual-sport motorcycle using a Ducati engine

In 1978, Cagiva entered the motorcycle business with two racing motorcycles ridden by Gianfranco Bonera and Marco Lucchinelli. In the same year it bought a factory in Varese's frazione of Schiranna from Aermacchi/AMF-Harley-Davidson and went into motorcycle production. By 1979 the company reached an annual production of 40,000 motorbikes, with eight models powered by two-stroke engines ranging from 125 cc to 350 cc.

Many of the Harley-Davidson models were continued in production as Cagivas, and the off-road motorcycle division was improved and expanded, eventually producing its own race-winning WMX series of motocross motorcycles.

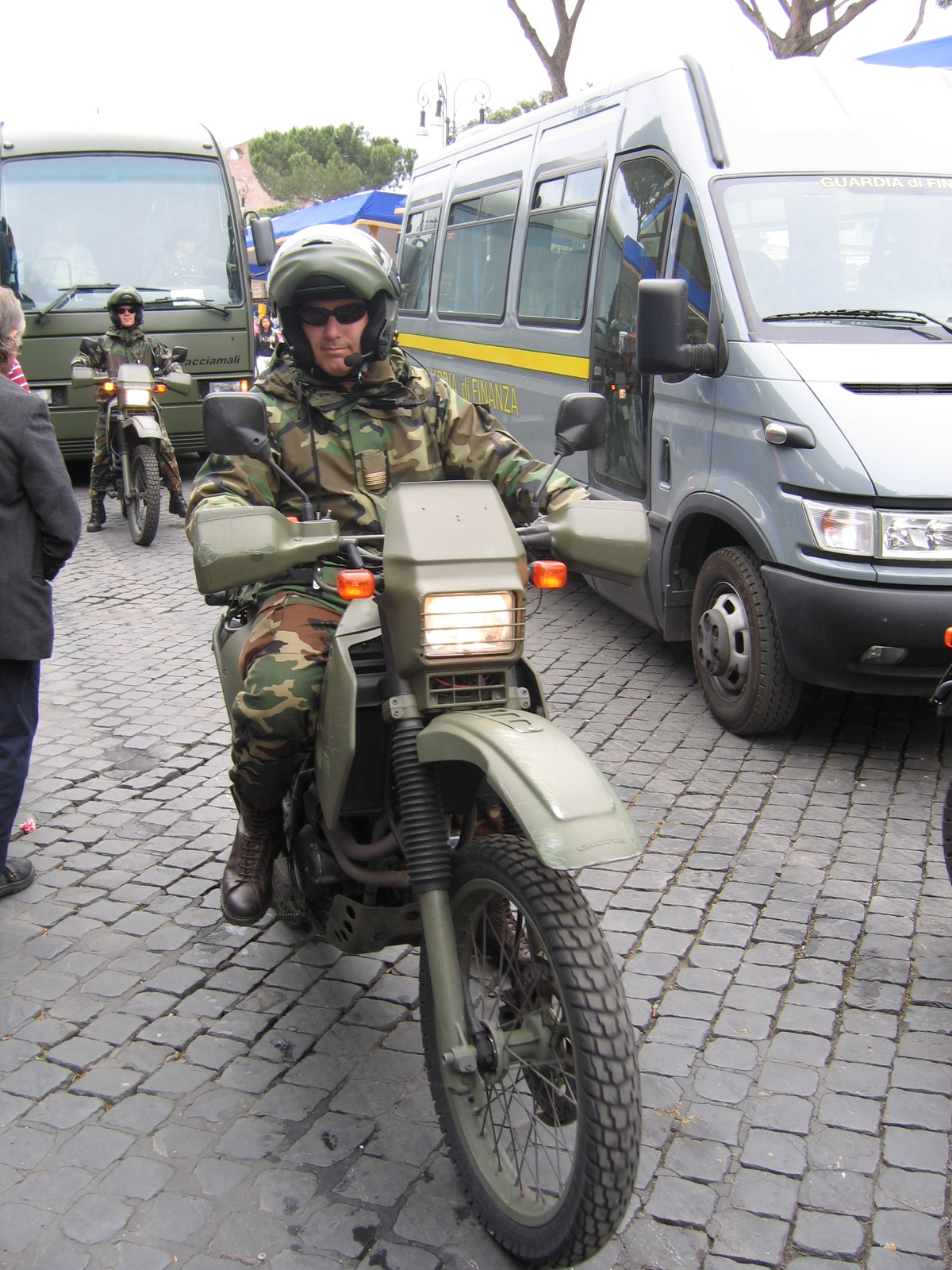
A W12 350 cm^{3}, currently in use in the Italian army and other armies because of its maneuverability and power

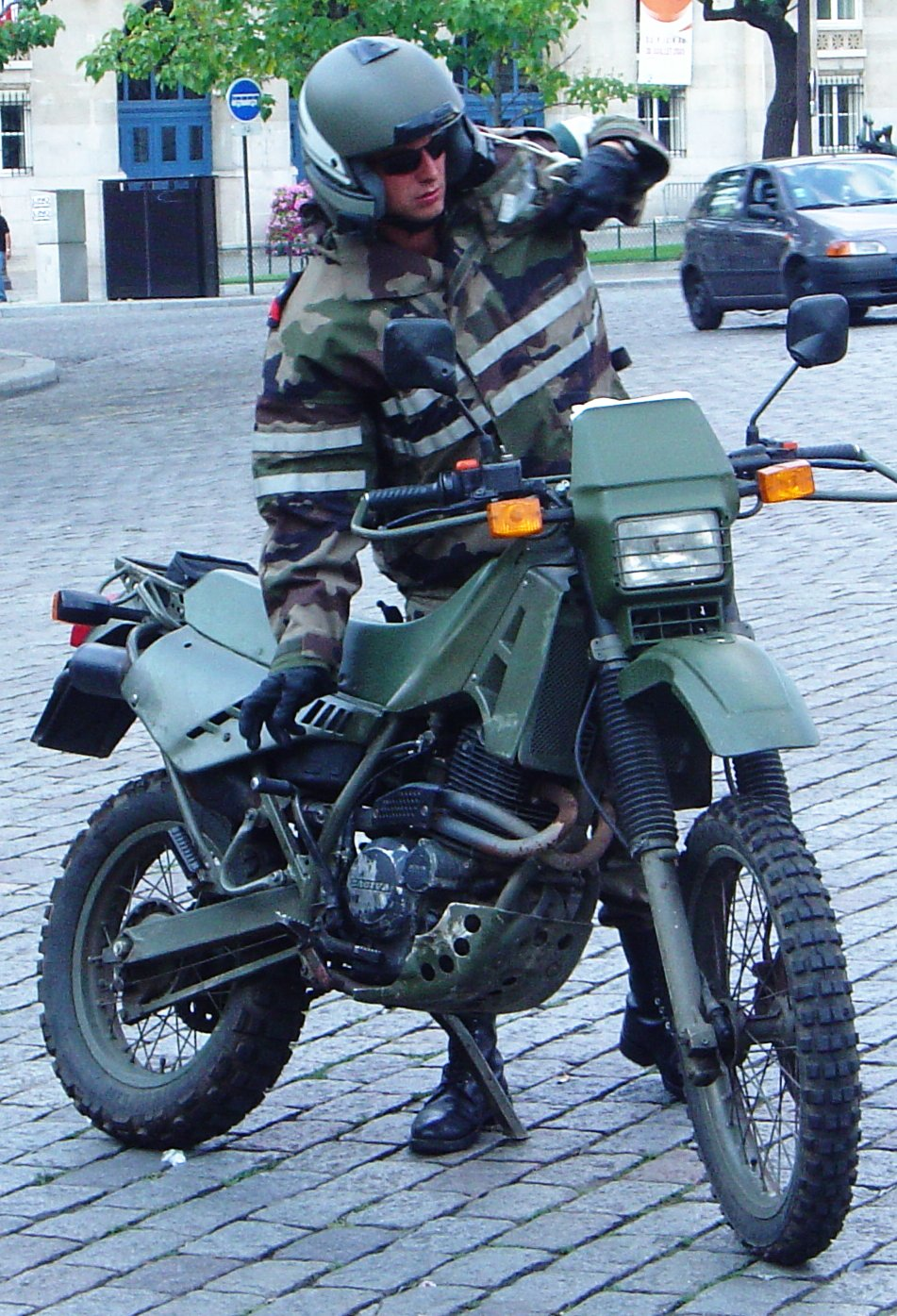
A Cagiva T4 used by the French Armed Forces

In 1983 Cagiva also sourced Ducati four stroke v-twin engines from 350 cc to 1000 cc and entered the big displacement market. Cagiva bought Ducati in 1985, but kept the Ducati brand that was better recognized outside Italy. Ducati motorcycle production continued in Bologna, while the Varese-built Cagiva Ala Azzurra (sold under the name "Alazzurra", "Bluewing") and Elefant were introduced, both featuring Ducati engines.

Cagiva continued with strategic buyouts of Moto Morini and Husqvarna in 1987. In 1991 Cagiva also bought the trademarks for the MV Agusta brand.

In 1996, Cagiva accepted the offer by the Texas Pacific Group and sold the Ducati and Moto Morini brands. In 1999 Cagiva Group was restructured for strategic purposes, with MV Agusta becoming the parent company and main brand identity; Cagiva along with Husqvarna thus became MV Agusta's subsidiaries.

In 2000, production of the Cagiva Roadster ended. In 2008, Harley-Davidson bought MV Agusta Motor, the parent company of Cagiva, thereby regaining some control of its old Aermacchi factory.

In October 2009, Harley-Davidson informed that it would put Cagiva up for sale. In the August of the following year, Cagiva was bought back by the son of the founder and former owner Claudio Castiglioni.

In 2012, production of new high engine capacity Mitos ended. Increasingly stringent environmental emission requirements and the concentration of resources on MV Agusta's F3 were cited as reasons. The last few Mito SP525s produced were white in colour, and personally signed by MV Agusta CEO Giovanni Castiglioni, thus ended the legacy of the Mito, alongside the end of the Raptors.

== Racing ==
In the early 1980s, Cagiva began to manufacture dirt bikes and started a massive public relations program with the opening of its North American branch. It hired Ron Turner and Duane Summers to test and develop its bikes. Cagiva motocross bikes were characterized by their fast powerful engines and innovative features, such as the MX line that had only one spring in the front forks with one fork controlling rebound and the other compression.

=== 500cc World Championship ===
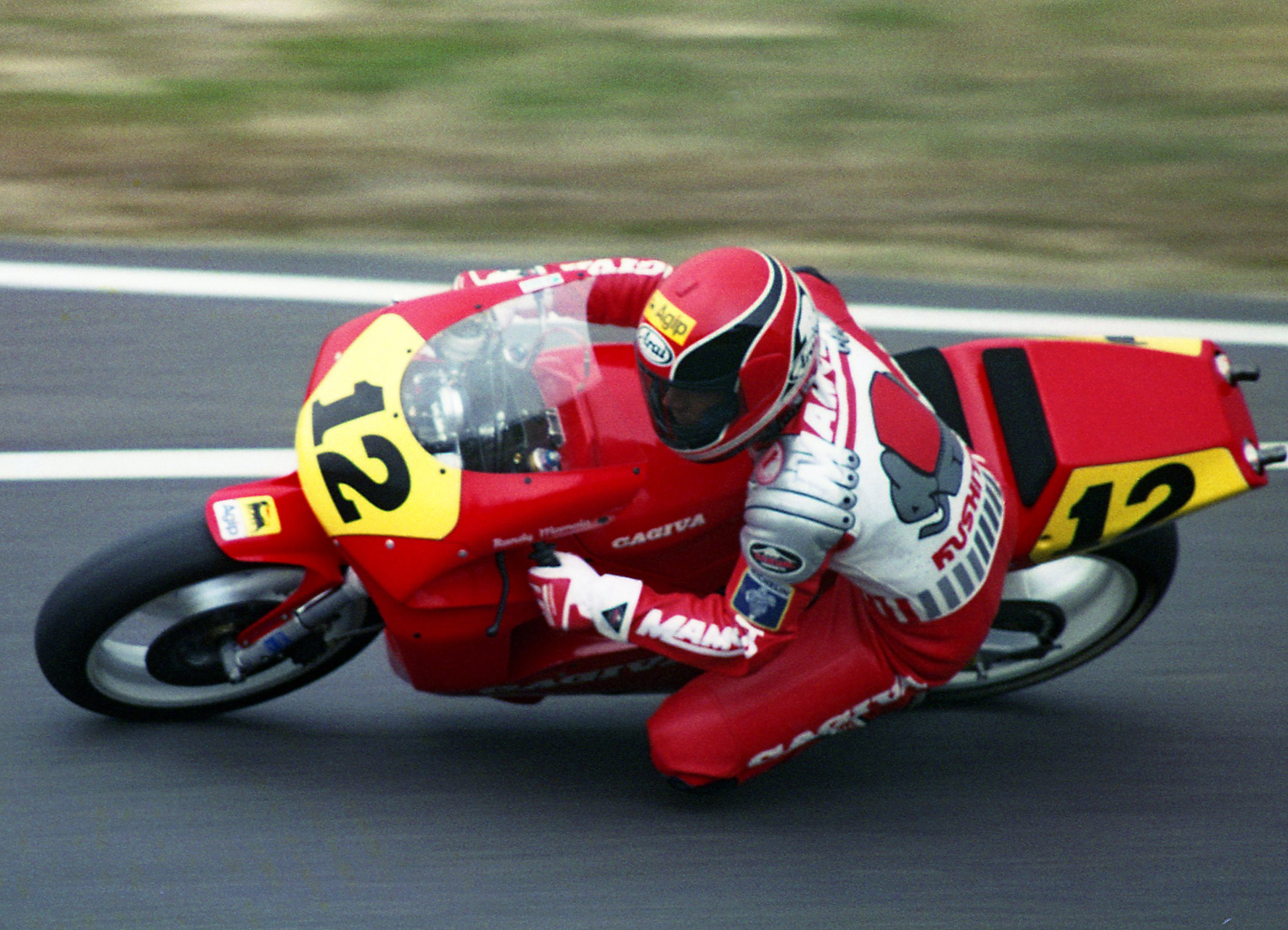
Cagiva C589, Randy Mamola, 1989 Japanese GP

At the end of the 1970s the company began campaigning the Grand Prix motorcycle racing circuit. Randy Mamola was its lead rider from 1988 to 1990, and he achieved Cagiva's first podium result. It would also have some technical assistance from Yamaha. In 1991 it signed former world champion Eddie Lawson to its team. Lawson would claim the company's first victory when he won the 1992 Hungarian Grand Prix. John Kocinski would also win a Grand Prix on a Cagiva GP500 (C594), finishing third in the 1994 world championship.

=== Dakar Rally ===
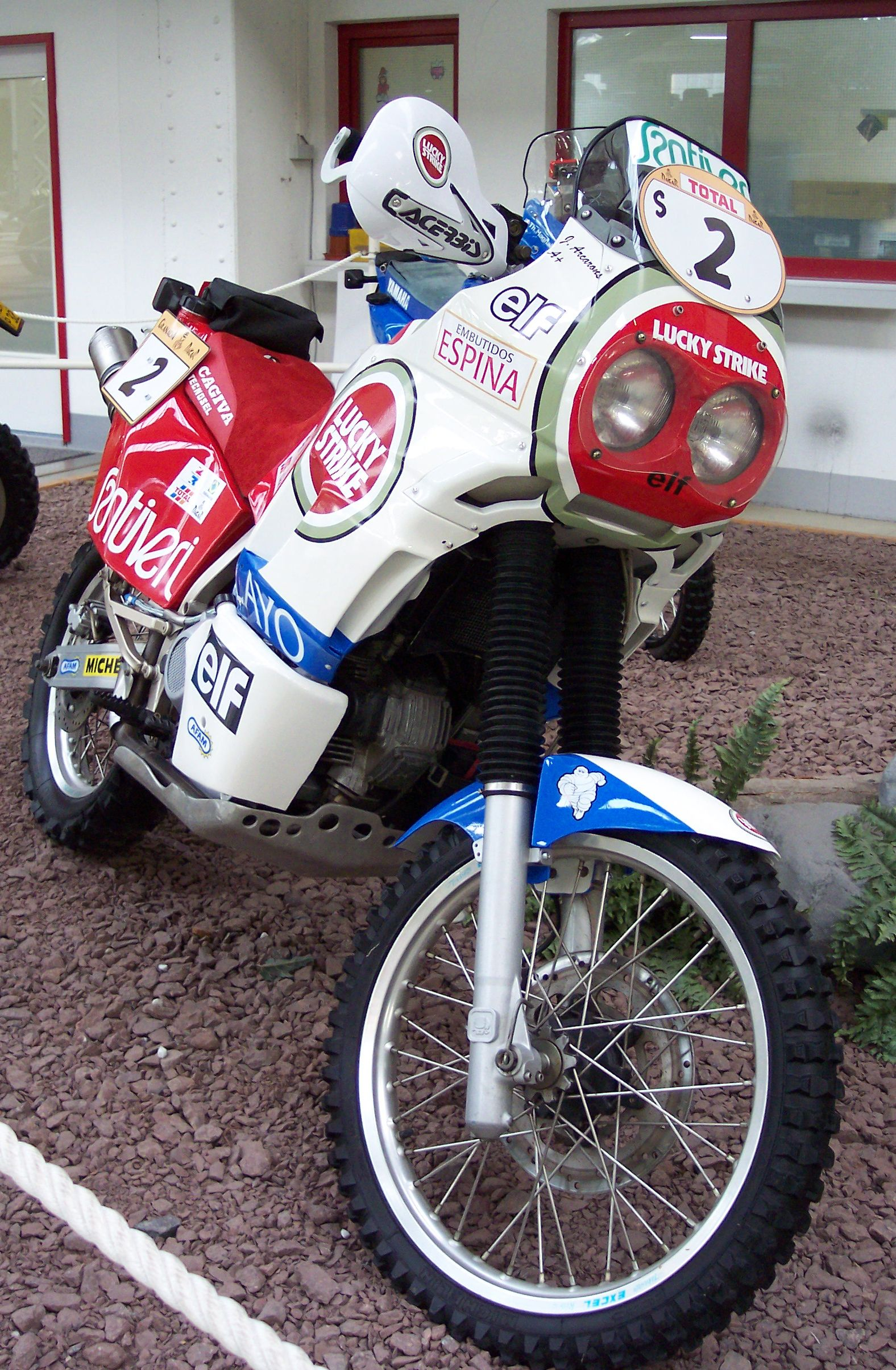
Cagiva 750 Elefant of Jordi Arcarons 1995 Dakar Rally

In 1990 and 1994 the Italian rider Edi Orioli won the Dakar Rally on the Ducati-powered Cagiva Elefant.

Year	Champion	Motorcycle
1990	(Italy) Edi Orioli	Elefant 944 Lucky Explorer
1994	(Italy) Edi Orioli	Elefant 944 Marathon

=== Motocross World Championship ===
==== Riders Championship ====
Year	Champion	Motorcycle
1985	(Finland) Pekka Vehkonen	Cagiva WMX
1986	(Netherlands) David Strijbos	Cagiva WMX

==== Constructors Championship ====
1985, 1986, 1987

=== Brazilian Motocross Championship ===
==== 125 cc class ====
Year	Champion	Motorcycle
1986	(United States) Rodney Smith	Cagiva WMX
1988	(Brazil) Jorge Negretti	Cagiva WMX

=== Italian Speed championship ===
Year	Champion	Class
1990	(Italy) Pierfrancesco Chili	Open
1991	(Italy) Marco Papa	Open
1992	(Italy) Marco Papa	Open
1994	(Italy) Luca Pasini	Supermono

== Mini Moke ==
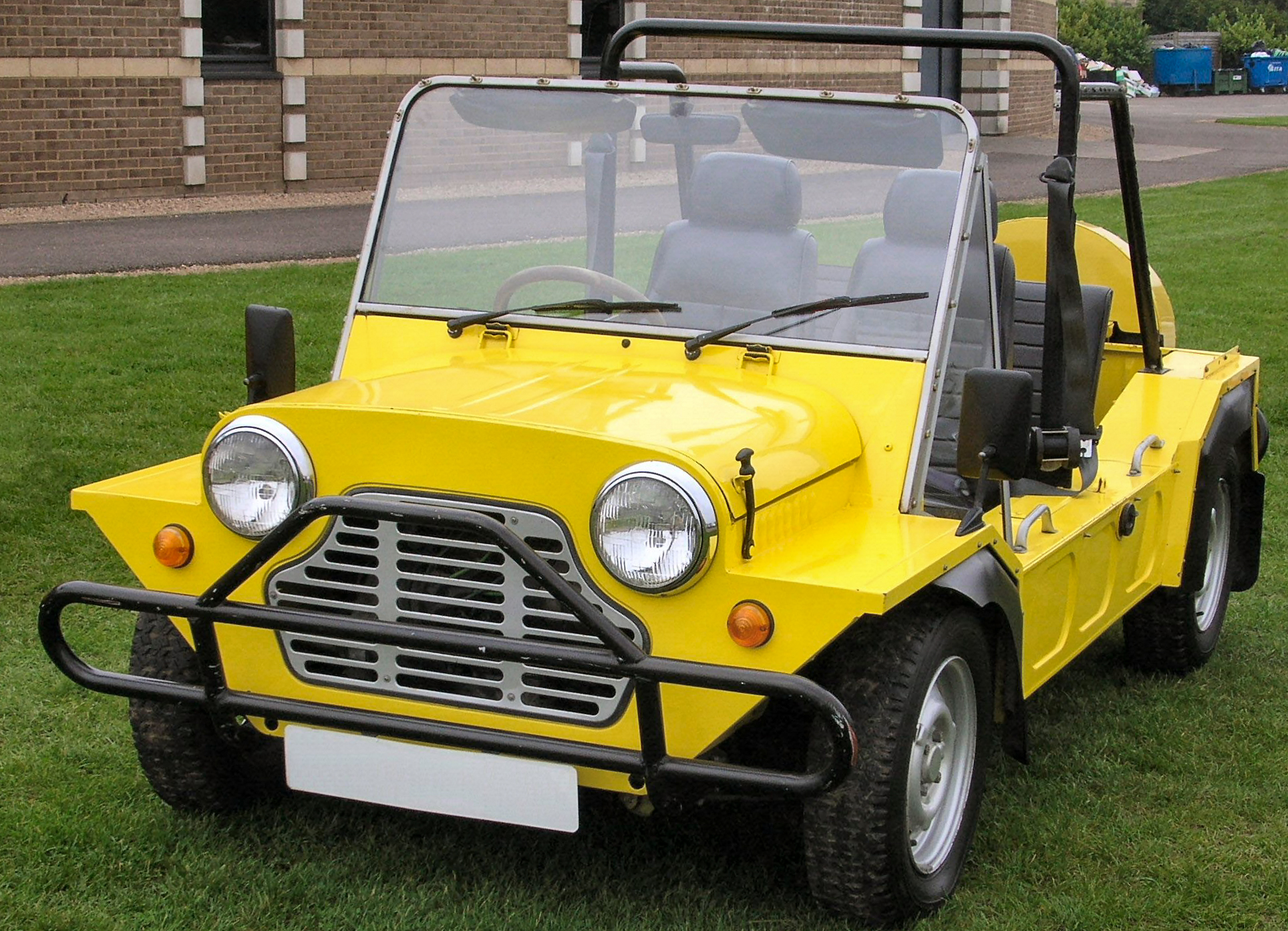
The Mini Moke

Cagiva bought BMC's design for the Mini Moke, manufacturing them in Portugal using British built engines from 1990 until 1993. Intending to transfer production to the Bologna factory early in 1995, the tooling for the Moke was transferred to Italy late in 1993, but production never restarted.

== Models ==
=== Racing motorcycles ===
Model	Engine	Years	Notes	Image
HD Cagiva RR250		(1979)		
Suzuki/Cagiva 500 GP		(1979)		
1C2		(1980)		
2C2		(1981)		
3C2		(1982)		
4C3		(1983)		Cagiva 4C3
C9		(1984)		
C10		(1985–1986–1987)		Cagiva C10
C587		(1987)		
125 GP		(1988)		
C588		(1988)		
C589		(1989)		Randy Mamola riding a Cagiva C589 at the 1989 Japanese Grand Prix
C590		(1990)		Cagiva C590
C591		(1991)		Cagiva C591
C592		(1992)		Eddie Lawson riding a Cagiva C592 at the 1992 Japanese Grand Prix
C593		(1993)		Doug Chandler, riding a Cagiva C593 at the 1993 Japanese Grand Prix
C594		(1994)		Cagiva C594
F4		(1995–1996)	prototype, Ferrari engine	Cagiva F4
Mito Mk II SP		()	The first bike of Valentino Rossi	Mito Mk II Sport Production official of the 1993 Lucky Explorer team driven by Valentino Rossi and Vittoriano Guareschi
Elefant 750 Elf-Ligier	748,1 cc, 90° L-twin, 4-stroke engine, SOHC, desmodromic 2-valves, air-cooled-Oil cooling	(1985)	Ducati Pantah engine. Cagiva team to Dakar 1985: Hubert Auriol, Giampaolo Marinoni and Gilles Picard	
Elefant 850 Lucky Explorer	cc, 90° L-twin, 4-stroke engine, SOHC, desmodromic 2-valves, air-cooled-Oil cooling	(1986–1987)	Ducati engine. Cagiva team to Dakar 1987: Hubert Auriol, Alessandro De Petri, Gilles Picard and Franco Gualdi.	
Elefant 900 Lucky Explorer	cc, 90° L-twin, 4-stroke engine, SOHC, desmodromic 2-valves, air-cooled-Oil cooling	(1988–1989)	Ducati engine. Cagiva team to Dakar 1988: Serge Bacou, Alessandro De Petri, Gilles Picard and Franco Gualdi. Cagiva team to Dakar 1989: Edi Orioli, Alessandro De Petri, Gilles Picard and Claudio Terruzzi.	
Elefant 944 Lucky Explorer	943,8 cc, 90° L-twin, 4-stroke engine, SOHC, desmodromic 2-valves, air-cooled-Oil cooling	(1990–1991)	Ducati engine. Cagiva team to Dakar 1990: Edi Orioli, Alessandro De Petri and Jordi Arcarons.	
Elefant 904 Lucky Explorer	cc, 90° L-twin, 4-stroke engine, SOHC, desmodromic 2-valves, air-cooled-Oil cooling	(1992)	Ducati engine. Cagiva team to Paris–Cape Town 1992: Danny Laporte, Jordi Arcarons, Marc Morales, Edi Orioli and Davide Trolli.	
Elefant 944 Marathon	cc, 90° L-twin, 4-stroke engine, SOHC, desmodromic 2-valves, air-cooled-Oil cooling	(1994–1995–1996–1997)	Ducati engine	

=== Road ===
Model	Engine	Years	Notes	Image
SST 125	123,15 cc, Single, Two-stroke engine, Reed valve, Air-cooled engine	(1975–1985)		
SST 175	, Single, Two-stroke engine, Reed valve, Air-cooled engine	()		
SST 250	243 cc, Single, Two-stroke engine, Reed valve, Air-cooled engine	(1975–1985)		
SST 350	341,8 cc, Single, Two-stroke engine, Reed valve, Air-cooled engine	(1978–1986)		
Alazzurra 350 / 350 GT	349 cc, 90° L-twin, 4-stroke engine, SOHC, desmodromic 2-valves, air-cooled	(1984–1985)	Ducati engine (Ducati Pantah)	Cagiva Alazzurra 350 GT
Alazzurra 400 / 400 GT	90° L-twin, 4-stroke engine, SOHC, desmodromic 2-valves, air-cooled	(1986)	Ducati engine (Ducati Pantah)	
Alazzurra 650 / 650 GT	649,5 cc, 90° L-twin, 4-stroke engine, SOHC, desmodromic 2-valves, air-cooled	(1984–1986)	Ducati engine (Ducati Pantah)	
Aletta Oro S1 / S2	124,63 cc, Single, Two-stroke engine, Reed valve, liquid cooling	(1985–1987)		
Blues	124,63 cc, Single, Two-stroke engine, Reed valve, liquid cooling	(1987–1993)		
Freccia C9	124,63 cc, Single, Two-stroke engine, Reed valve, liquid cooling	(1987)		
Freccia C10R / C10 Anniversary	124,63 cc, Single, Two-stroke engine, Reed valve, liquid cooling	(1988)		Cagiva C10 Anniversary
Freccia C12R / C12 SP	124,63 cc, Single, Two-stroke engine, Reed valve, liquid cooling	(1989–1990)		Cagiva Freccia C12R
Mito	124,63 cc	()		Cagiva Mito, 1992
Mito Mk II	124,63 cc	()		
Mito Ev	124,63 cc	()		Cagiva Mito Evolution II, 2001
Mito SP525	124,63 cc	()		Mito SP525
SuperCity 125		()		
Roadster 521		()		
Roadster 200		()		
Low Rider 125		()		Cagiva Low Rider 125
Planet	124,63 cc, Single, Two-stroke engine, Reed valve, liquid cooling	(1997–2003)	Mito engine	Cagiva Planet 125
River 500		()		
River 600		()		
Raptor 125	124,63 cc, Single, Two-stroke engine, Reed valve, liquid cooling	(2003–2007)	Mito engine	
Raptor 650	645,5 cc, 90° V-twin, 4-stroke engine, DOHC, 4-valves, liquid cooling	(2001–2007)	Suzuki engine, (SV650)	Cagiva Raptor 650
V-Raptor 650	645,5 cc, 90° V-twin, 4-stroke engine, DOHC, 4-valves, liquid cooling	(2001–2004)	Suzuki engine, (SV650)	Cagiva V-Raptor 650
Raptor 1000	996 cc, 90° V-twin, 4-stroke engine, DOHC, 4-valves, liquid cooling	(2000–2006)	Suzuki engine, (TL1000S)	Cagiva Raptor 1000
V-Raptor 1000	996 cc, 90° V-twin, 4-stroke engine, DOHC, 4-valves, liquid cooling	(2000–2006)	Suzuki engine, (TL1000S)	Cagiva V-Raptor 1000
Xtra Raptor 1000	996 cc, 90° V-twin, 4-stroke engine, DOHC, 4-valves, liquid cooling	(2002–2006)	Suzuki engine, (TL1000S)	Cagiva Xtra Raptor 1000

=== Off road - enduro - trial ===
Model	Engine	Years	Notes	Image
WMX 125	124,63 cc, Single, Two-stroke engine, Reed valve, Air-cooled engine-liquid cooling	(1980–1991)		
WMX 200	, Single, Two-stroke engine, Reed valve, Air-cooled engine	()		
WMX 250	, Single, Two-stroke engine, Reed valve, Air-cooled engine	()		
WMX 500	, Single, Two-stroke engine, Reed valve, liquid cooling	()		
WRX 125	124,63 cc, Single, Two-stroke engine, Reed valve, Air-cooled engine	()		
DG 350	341,9 cc, Single, Two-stroke engine, Reed valve, Air-cooled engine	()		
TR Cresta 350	341,9 cc, Single, Two-stroke engine, Reed valve, Air-cooled engine	()		
125 Trial	124,5 cc, Single, Two-stroke engine, Reed valve, Air-cooled engine	()		
RX 125 Rally	124,63 cc, Single, Two-stroke engine, Reed valve, Air-cooled engine	()		
RX 250 Rally	248,36 cc, Single, Two-stroke engine, Reed valve, Air-cooled engine	()		
RX 250	248,36 cc, Single, Two-stroke engine, Reed valve, Air-cooled engine	()		
MXR 250	248,36 cc, Single, Two-stroke engine, Reed valve, Air-cooled engine			
MXR 500	, Single, Two-stroke engine, Reed valve, Air-cooled engine	()		

=== Adventure - dual sport ===
Model	Engine	Years	Notes	Image
SXT 125	124,63 cc, Single, Two-stroke engine, Reed valve, Air-cooled engine	(1975–1983)		Cagiva SXT, 1984
SXT 175	, Single, Two-stroke engine, Reed valve, Air-cooled engine	()		
SXT 250	243 cc, Single, Two-stroke engine, Reed valve, Air-cooled engine	(1975–1985)		
SXT 350	342,00 cc, Single, Two-stroke engine, Reed valve, Air-cooled engine	(1978–1984)		
Ala Blu 125	124,63 cc, Single, Two-stroke engine, Reed valve, Air-cooled engine	(1983–1985)		
Ala Blu 250	, Single, Two-stroke engine, Reed valve, Air-cooled engine	(1983–1985)		
Ala Blu 350	342,00 cc, Single, Two-stroke engine, Reed valve, Air-cooled engine	(1983–1985)		
Aletta Rossa 125	124,63 cc, Single, Two-stroke engine, Reed valve, liquid cooling	(1983–1987)		Cagiva Aletta Rossa 125
Aletta Rossa 200	190,38 cc, Single, Two-stroke engine, Reed valve, liquid cooling	(1984–1986)		
Ala Rossa 350	343 cc, Single, 4-stroke engine, SOHC, 2-valves, Air-cooled engine	(1983–1988)		
Elefant 125; Elefant2 125; Elefant3 125	124,63 cc, Single, Two-stroke engine, Reed valve, liquid cooling	(1984–1990)		
Elefant 200	190,38 cc, Single, Two-stroke engine, Reed valve, liquid cooling	()		
Elefant 350; Elefant 350 Big Belly	349 cc, 90° V-twin, 4-stroke engine, Desmodromic valve, 2-valves, Air-cooled engine	(1985–1989)	Ducati engine	
Elefant 650; Elefant 650 MK2; Elefant 650 MK3; Elefant 650 L.E. Elefant 650 Frecce Tricolori; Elefant 650 Ligier Export	649,6 cc, 90° V-twin, 4-stroke engine, Desmodromic valve, 2-valves, Air-cooled engine-Oil cooling	(1985–1989)	Ducati engine	Cagiva Elefant 650 Ligier Export
Elefant 750; Elefant 750 bifaro Elefant 750 AC; Elefant 750 Marathon	748 cc, 90° V-twin, 4-stroke engine, Desmodromic valve, 2-valves, Air-cooled engine-Oil cooling	(1987–1998)	Ducati engine	Cagiva Elefant 750 MK1 Cagiva Elefant 750 Marathon
Elefant 900 i.e. Elefant 900 i.e. GT; Elefant 900 AC; Elefant E900; Elefant Marathon 944; Ducati E900 (North American market)	904 cc, 90° V-twin, 4-stroke engine, Desmodromic valve, 2-valves, Air-cooled engine-Oil cooling	(1991–1997)	Ducati engine	Cagiva Elefant 900 i.e. Elefant 900 AC
T4 350 E / T4 350 R	343 cc, Single, 4-stroke engine, SOHC, 4-valves, Air-cooled engine	(1987–1991)		Cagiva T4 350 E former French army in the Alps
T4 500 E / T4 500 R	452 cc, Single, 4-stroke engine, SOHC, 4-valves, Air-cooled engine	(1987–1991)		
Canyon 500	498 cc, Single, 4-stroke engine, SOHC, 4-valves, Air-cooled engine-Oil cooling	(1997–2002)		
Canyon 600	601,4 cc, Single, 4-stroke engine, SOHC, 4-valves, Air-cooled engine-Oil cooling	(1995–1998)		
Gran Canyon	904 cc, 90° V-twin, 4-stroke engine, Desmodromic valve, 2-valves, Air-cooled engine-Oil cooling	(1998–2000)	Ducati engine	Cagiva Gran Canyon
W8	124,63 cc, Single, Two-stroke engine, Reed valve, liquid cooling	(1991–1995)	A cheaper version was subsequently produced until 1999 with an air-cooled thermal unit without an exhaust valve and the piston exclusively of the two-band type, furthermore the silencer was replaced with a painted iron model.	Cagiva W8
W12	343 cc, Single, 4-stroke engine, SOHC, 4-valves, Air-cooled engine	(1993–1996)		Cagiva W12 supplied to the Italian Army
W16	601,41 cc, Single, 4-stroke engine, SOHC, 4-valves, Air-cooled engine	(1994–2001)	GoldenEye - Pierce Brosnan Cagiva 600 W16 In the pre-title sequence of GoldenEye set in Russia's Arkangel facility, Bond is in trouble. He retrieves a Cagiva motorcycle from a dispatched guard and accelerates down a runway in pursuit of a pilot-less aeroplane - his only escape.	Cagiva W16 in National Motor Museum, Beaulieu
Cruiser	124,63 cc, Single, Two-stroke engine, Reed valve, liquid cooling	(1987–1989)	Freccia C9 engine	
Tamanaco	124,63 cc, Single, Two-stroke engine, Reed valve, liquid cooling	(1988–1991)	Freccia C10 engine	Cagiva Tamanaco
N90	124,63 cc, Single, Two-stroke engine, Reed valve, liquid cooling	(1990–1991)	Mito engine	
Navigator 1000	996 cc, 90° V-twin, 4-stroke engine, DOHC, 4-valves, liquid cooling	(2000–2005)	Suzuki engine, (TL1000S)	Cagiva Navigator 1000

=== Moped and Scooter ===
- Cocis
- Prima 50 / Prima 75
- SuperCity 50 / SuperCity 75
- Mito 50
- W4 50 / W4 75
- Passing 50 (Scooter)
- Stella 115 / Stella 125R

== See also ==
- List of Italian companies
- List of motorcycle manufacturers
