= Brazilian Motocross Championship =

Premier domestic Brazilian Motocross series

- Category: Motocross
- Country: Brazil
- Inaugural season: 1973

The Brazilian Motocross Championship (Portuguese: Campeonato Brasileiro de Motocross) is the premier domestic Brazilian Motocross series, sanctioned by the Confederação Brasileira de Motociclismo.

The series runs annually throughout the spring and summer months. The premier classes are MX1 and MX2, which are supported at each round by classes for junior, youth and women riders.

== History ==
The first motocross races in Brazil were held in 1971, with the inaugural formally-constituted national championship taking place two years later. The first fifteen years of the series saw periods of domination by certain riders, particularly Nivanor Bernardi and Pedro Bernardo Raymundo "Moronguinho" - who won 14 national championships between 1976 and 1985. American Rodney Smith became the first non-native competitor to become Brazilian champion, when he won both titles in 1986.

A new generation of Brazilian riders would come to the forth during the late 1980s and 1990s. With the exception of Anthony Pocorobba's 1999 triumph in the 250 class, Brazilian riders would be unchallenged until the 2010s. The championship saw an influx of foreign riders during the 2010s, the most notable being 2010 MX3 world champion Carlos Campano, who won five titles between 2012 and 2018. This trend continued into the 2020s, with riders such as Jeremy Van Horebeek, Stephen Rubini and from the 2026 season, Glenn Coldenhoff joining the championship.

From the 2026 season, several rounds of the championship will double as rounds of the new South American Motocross Championship.

== Broadcast ==
The comprehensive broadcast of each round of the Brazilian Motocross Championship is currently via a live stream on the SportbayTV YouTube channel.

== List of Champions ==
| Season | MX1 Champion | MX2 Champion |
|---|---|---|
| 2026 | (Netherlands) Glenn Coldenhoff (Yamaha) | (Spain) Salvador Pérez (Yamaha) |
| 2025 | (France) Stephen Rubini (Honda) | (Brazil) Bernardo Tibúrcio (Honda) |
| 2024 | (Brazil) Fábio Santos (Yamaha) | (Brazil) Vitor Borba (Honda) |
| 2023 | (Brazil) Fábio Santos (Yamaha) | (Brazil) Guilherme Bresolin (Yamaha) |
| 2022 | (Ecuador) Jetro Salazar (Honda) | (Brazil) Frederico Spagnol (Honda) |
| 2021 | (Brazil) Fábio Santos (Yamaha) | (Brazil) Lucas Dunka (Yamaha) |
| 2020 | (Portugal) Paulo Alberto (Yamaha) | (Brazil) Lucas Dunka (Honda) |
| 2019 | (Ecuador) Jetro Salazar (Honda) | (Brazil) Fábio Santos (Yamaha) |
| 2018 | (Spain) Carlos Campano (Yamaha) | (Brazil) Fábio Santos (Yamaha) |
| 2017 | (Spain) Carlos Campano (Yamaha) | (Brazil) Gustavo Pessoa (Honda) |
| 2016 | (Ecuador) Jetro Salazar (Honda) | (Brazil) Fábio Santos (Yamaha) |
| 2015 | (Spain) Carlos Campano (Yamaha) | (Brazil) Hector Assunção (Honda) |
| 2014 | (Spain) Carlos Campano (Yamaha) | (Brazil) Hector Assunção (Honda) |
| 2013 | (United Kingdom) Adam Chatfield (Honda) | (Portugal) Paulo Alberto (Honda) |
| 2012 | (Spain) Carlos Campano (Yamaha) | (Brazil) Hector Assunção (Honda) |
| 2011 | (Brazil) Antonio Balbi (Kawasaki) | (Brazil) Jean Ramos (Honda) |
| 2010 | (United States) Scott Simon (Kawasaki) | (United States) Scott Simon (Kawasaki) |
| 2009 | (Brazil) Wellington Garcia (Honda) | (Brazil) Wellington Garcia (Honda) |
| 2008 | (Brazil) João Paulino da Silva (Kawasaki) | (Brazil) Rodrigo Selhorst (KTM) |
| 2007 | (Brazil) Wellington Garcia (Honda) | (Brazil) Wellington Garcia (Honda) |
| 2006 | (Brazil) João Paulino da Silva (Suzuki) | (Brazil) Leandro Silva (Honda) |
| 2005 | (Brazil) João Paulino da Silva (Suzuki) | (Brazil) Marcello Lima (Yamaha) |

| Season | 250 Champion | 125 Champion | Open Champion |
|---|---|---|---|
| 2004 | (Brazil) Antonio Balbi (Honda) | (Brazil) Kristofer Florenzano (Yamaha) | (Brazil) Milton Becker (Honda) |
| 2003 | (Brazil) Antonio Balbi (Honda) | (Brazil) Milton Becker (Honda) | (Brazil) Cássio Garcia (Honda) |
| 2002 | (Brazil) Massoud Nassar (Honda) | (Brazil) Roosevelt Assunção (Honda) | (Brazil) Cássio Garcia (Honda) |
| 2001 | (Brazil) Milton Becker (Honda) | (Brazil) Ismael Pereira Maia (Yamaha) | (Brazil) Marco Müller (Yamaha) |
| 2000 | (Brazil) Milton Becker (Honda) | (Brazil) Roosevelt Assunção (Honda) | (Brazil) Leonardo Müller (Yamaha) |
| 1999 | (United States) Anthony Pocorobba (Suzuki) | (Brazil) Antonio Balbi (Yamaha) | (Brazil) Wellington Valadares (Yamaha) |
| 1998 | (Brazil) Jorge Negretti (Honda) | (Brazil) Massoud Nassar (Suzuki) | - |
| 1997 | (Brazil) Cristiano Lopes (Honda) | (Brazil) Paulo Stedile (Yamaha) | - |
| 1996 | (Brazil) Rogério Nogueira (Honda) | (Brazil) Gilberto Narezzi (Honda) | - |
| 1995 | (Brazil) Cristiano Lopes (Honda) | (Brazil) Milton Becker (Suzuki) | - |
| 1994 | (Brazil) Rogério Nogueira (Honda) | (Brazil) Cristiano Lopes (Honda) | - |
| 1993 | (Brazil) Gilberto Narezzi (Honda) | (Brazil) Gilberto Narezzi (Honda) | - |
| 1992 | (Brazil) Milton Becker (Yamaha) | (Brazil) Gilberto Narezzi (Honda) | - |
| 1991 | (Brazil) Jorge Negretti (Honda) | (Brazil) Cássio Garcia (Honda) | - |
| 1990 | (Brazil) Jorge Negretti (Kawasaki) | (Brazil) Jorge Negretti (Kawasaki) | - |
| 1989 | (Brazil) Eduardo Saçaki (Kawasaki) | (Brazil) Rogério Nogueira (Honda) | - |
| 1988 | (Brazil) Eduardo Saçaki (Yamaha) | (Brazil) Jorge Negretti (Cagiva) | - |
| 1987 | (Brazil) Jorge Negretti (Yamaha) | (Brazil) Jorge Negretti (Yamaha) | - |
| 1986 | (United States) Rodney Smith (KTM) | (United States) Rodney Smith (Cagiva) | - |
| 1985 | (Brazil) Pedro Bernardo Raymundo (Honda) | (Brazil) Pedro Bernardo Raymundo (Honda) | - |
| 1984 | (Brazil) Álvaro Cândido Filho (Honda) | (Brazil) Pedro Bernardo Raymundo (Honda) | - |
| 1983 | (Brazil) Álvaro Cândido Filho (Honda) | (Brazil) Pedro Bernardo Raymundo (Honda) | - |
| 1982 | (Brazil) Pedro Bernardo Raymundo (Honda) | (Brazil) Pedro Bernardo Raymundo (Honda) | - |
| 1981 | (Brazil) Pedro Bernardo Raymundo (Honda) | (Brazil) Pedro Bernardo Raymundo (Honda) | - |
| 1980 | (Brazil) Pedro Bernardo Raymundo (Yamaha) | (Brazil) Pedro Bernardo Raymundo (Yamaha) | - |
| 1979 | (Brazil) Pedro Bernardo Raymundo (Suzuki) | (Brazil) Roberto Boettcher (Yamaha) | - |
| 1978 | (Brazil) Nivanor Bernardi (Yamaha) | (Brazil) Pedro Bernardo Raymundo (Suzuki) | - |
| 1977 | (Brazil) Nivanor Bernardi (Yamaha) | (Brazil) Nivanor Bernardi (Yamaha) | - |
| 1976 | (Brazil) Pedro Bernardo Raymundo (Yamaha) | (Brazil) Pedro Bernardo Raymundo (Yamaha) | - |
| 1975 | (Brazil) Roberto Boettcher (Yamaha) | (Brazil) Roberto Boettcher (Yamaha) | - |
| 1974 | (Brazil) Nivanor Bernardi (Yamaha) | (Brazil) Nivanor Bernardi (Yamaha) | - |
| 1973 | (Brazil) Nivanor Bernardi (Yamaha) | (Brazil) André Alves (Yamaha) | - |
