= Gilera Ice =

- Manufacturer: Gilera
- Parent company: Piaggio
- Production: 2001-2003
- Assembly: Pontedera, Italy
- Class: Scooter
- Engine: 50 cm^{3} Piaggio Hi Per-2
- Top speed: 45 km/h
- Transmission: CVT
- Brakes: 190 mm front disc 110 mm rear drum
- Tires: 120/90 R10-R10"
- Wheelbase: 1290 mm
- Dimensions: L: 1710 mm W: 750 mm
- Seat height: 780 mm
- Weight: 86 kg (dry)

The Gilera Ice is a scooter produced by the Italian manufacturer Gilera from 2001 to 2003 in the Piaggio Group factory of Pontedera.

== History ==
Presented at the Bologna Motor Show in November 2000, the Gilera Ice is a sport scooter aimed at a young audience and available only in the 50 version.

Characterized by the “Axe Frame” chassis in exposed pressed steel, this solution guarantees a resistance to bending and torsion 400% higher than that of a conventional frame. Designed by Frascoli Design, it has an aggressive line with the front shield made of recyclable plastic and liquid crystal instrumentation.

The engine is the Piaggio 50 Hi-Per 2 “air cooled”, two-stroke with two-stage catalytic converter and Secondary Air System. The engine is Euro 1 approved. The tank has a capacity of six liters. It features the fork with 30mm stanchions, a rear monoshock with 4-position adjustable spring preload. The braking system consists of a 190 mm front disc and a 110 mm rear drum; the rims are in 10” painted aluminum alloy with oversized tires.

Sales in Italy start in April 2001 after the presentation for road tests held at the MTV Live @Futurshow in Bologna. In the rest of Europe, sales start in summer 2001.

Due to disappointing sales it went out of production in 2003.
