= Cagiva Roadster =

Italian racing motorcycle

The Roadster 521 is a 125cc motorcycle made by the Italian motorcycle firm, Cagiva in the 1990s.

One of the fastest accelerating 125cc motorcycles of its time, the Roadster 521 is known to have a top speed of 80 mph restricted and an estimated 100 mph+ un-restricted. Achieving approximately 70 miles per gallon, it is relatively economical for a 2-stroke motorcycle. In 2000, production of the Cagiva Roadster ended. In 2008, Harley-Davidson bought MV Agusta Motor, the parent company of Cagiva, thereby regaining some control of its old Aermacchi factory.

== Specification ==
Make Model

Cagiva Roadster 521

Number produced 329 between 1993 and 1999

Year 1993

Engine Air cooled, Single cylinder, two stroke Capacity

125 Bore x Stroke 56 x 50.6 mm

Compression Ratio 11.7:1 Induction

Ignition / Starting Electronic CDI

Max Power 15.5 hp @ 7500 rpm

Max Torque 18 Nm @ 9000 rpm

Transmission / Drive 6 Speed / chain

Front Suspension Hydraulic telescopic fork

Rear Suspension Single-shock Soft-Damp

Front Brakes Single 260mm disc

Rear Brakes 160mm drum

Front Tyre 3,25-19

Rear Tyre 140/90-15

Dry-Weight 125 kg

Fuel Capacity 11 Litres

Consumption average 22.0 km/lit

Braking 60 - 0 / 100 - 0 13.3 m / 39.9 m

Standing ¼ Mile 18.6 sec / 104.0 km/h
