= Cagiva GP500 =

Grand Prix 500cc two-stroke motorcycle

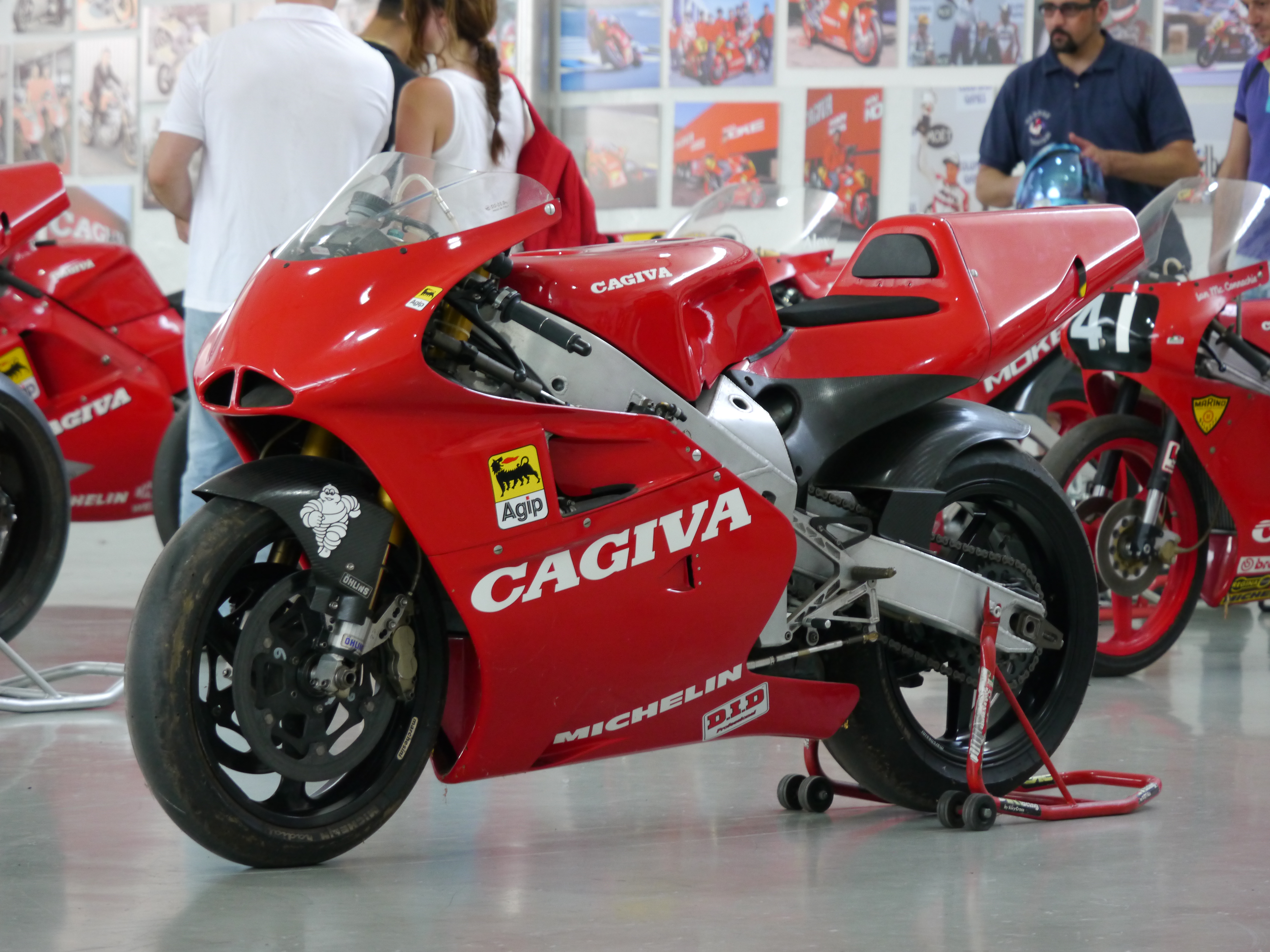
- Cagiva C594 on display
- Manufacturer: Cagiva
- Also called: C587, C588, C589, C590, C591, C592, C593, C594
- Production: 1987–1994
- Predecessor: Cagiva C10
- Class: Grand Prix race bike
- Engine: 498 cc (30.4 cu in) 80° V4 two-stroke
- Bore / stroke: 56 mm × 50.6 mm (2.20 in × 1.99 in)
- Power: 185 hp (138 kW) @ 12,500 rpm
- Torque: 103 N⋅m (76 lb⋅ft) @ 12,100 rpm
- Wheelbase: 1,390 mm (55 in)
- Fuel capacity: 21 L (4.6 imp gal; 5.5 US gal)

The Cagiva GP500 was a Grand Prix 500-cubic-centimetre (31 cu in) two-stroke race bike manufactured by Cagiva. It was released in various iterations (C587, V593, C594, etc.) throughout the years it was raced. Racing greats including Eddie Lawson, Randy Mamola, John Kocinski, Doug Chandler, Alex Barros and Mat Mladin, all raced versions of the GP500 at one time in their careers.

Eddie Lawson's win in the 1992 Hungarian motorcycle Grand Prix at the Hungaroring was the first 500cc Motorcycle Grand Prix victory for the Cagiva GP500.
