= Reed valve =

Type of check valve

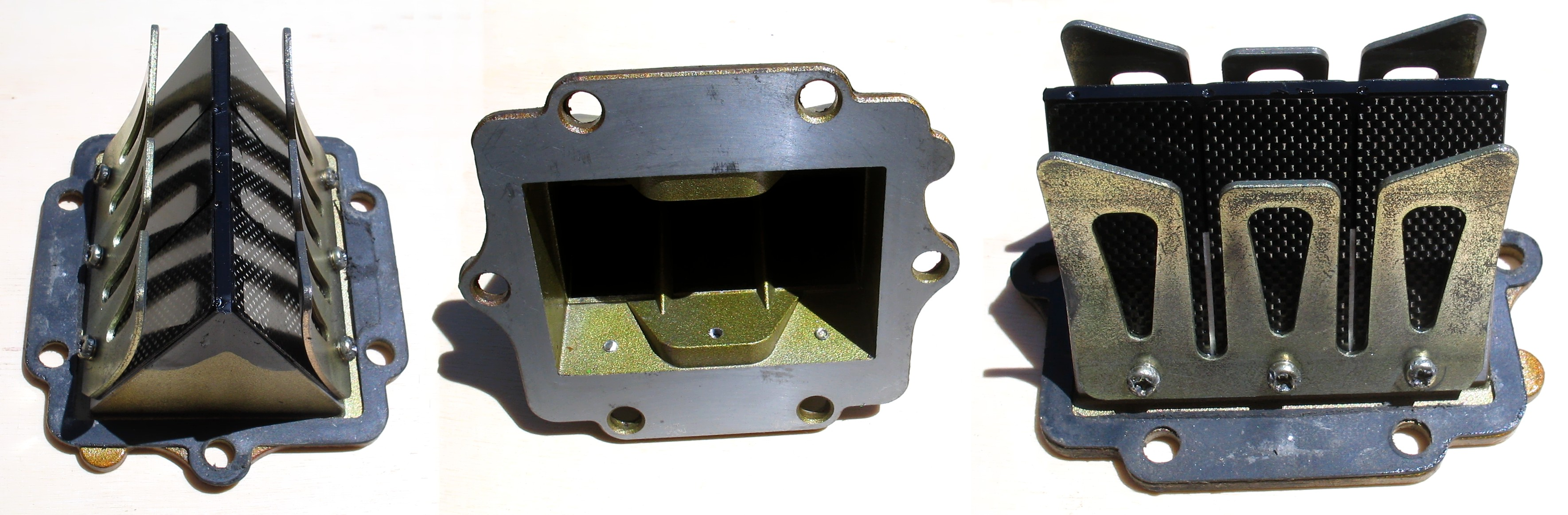
Reed valve of a Kawasaki KX 125 1989 from multiple angles, featuring a mark indicating the correct installation position.

Reed valves are a type of check valve which restrict the flow of fluids to a single direction, opening and closing under changing pressure on each face. Modern versions often consist of flexible metal or composite materials (fiberglass or carbon fiber).

== Applications ==
=== Traditional ===
Reed valves, normally a leather flap covering a hole, are amongst the earliest form of automatic flow control for liquids and gases. They have been used for thousands of years in water pumps and for hundreds of years in bellows for high-temperature forges and musical instruments such as church organs and accordions. In nature, heart valves operate in a somewhat similar fashion.

=== Pumps ===
Reed valves are used in some reciprocating compressor designs, and in the pumping element of some musical instruments, large and small.

=== Two-stroke engines ===
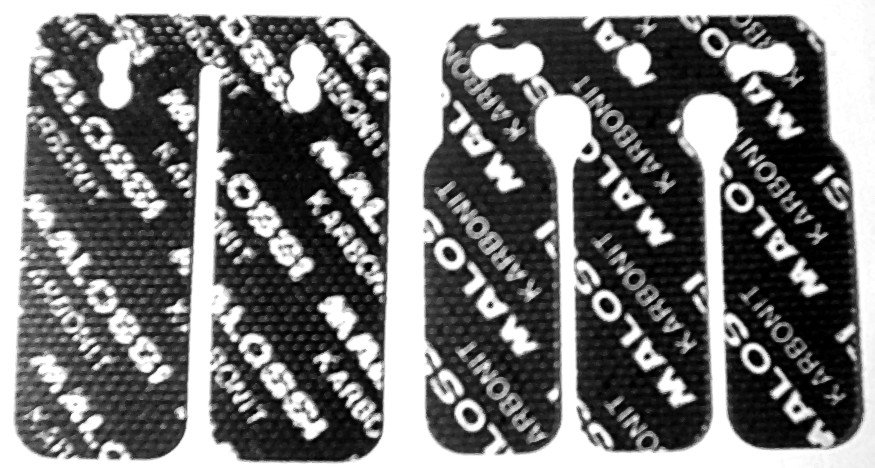
A pair of Malossi reed valve blades made from carbon fibre

Reed valves are commonly used in high-performance versions of the two-stroke engine, where they control the fuel-air mixture admitted to the cylinder. As the piston rises in the cylinder a vacuum is created in the crankcase beneath the piston. The resulting pressure differential opens the valve and the fuel-air mixture flows into the crankcase. As the piston descends, it raises the crankcase pressure causing the valve to close to retain the mixture and pressurize it for its eventual transfer through to the combustion chamber. The Swedish motorcycle company Husqvarna produced a two-stroke, 500 cc displacement single cylinder engine with a reed-valve controlled intake, one of the biggest in using this arrangement. Reed valves in two-stroke engines have been placed in the intake ports and also in controlling the intake to the crankshaft space.

Composite materials are preferred in racing engines, especially in kart racing, because the stiffness of the petals can be easily tuned and they are relatively safe in failure. High-speed impact takes its toll on all reed valves, with metal valves suffering in fatigue. The physical inertia of reed valves means that they are not as entirely precise in action as rotary valves, a rotary valve engine may run better than a reed valve engine at a small rpm range but the reed valve engine often runs better over a wider rpm range. More sophisticated designs partly address this by creating multi-stage reeds with smaller, more responsive reeds within larger ones that provide more volume later in the cycle. Nevertheless, current technology favors reed valves almost to the exclusion of rotary valves due to their simplicity and low implementation costs and less rotational mass.

=== Wankel rotary combustion engines ===
Yanmar Diesel, a Japanese engine maker, was pioneer in introducing reed valves for flow control at intake ports of its small Wankel engines, showing an improvement in torque and performances at low rpm and under partial load of the engine. Toyota discovered the benefits of injecting fresh air into the Wankel RCE exhaust port, and also used a reed valve in prototypes where they tested the SCRE concept (Stratified Charge Rotary Engine). However, this kind of intake port arrangement never reached the production line for automobile size RCEs. According to David W. Garside, who developed the Norton line of Wankel-powered motorcycles, data from other RCE producers pointed that reed valves do improve performances at low rpm and under partial load, but reduce the high speed power output of the engine, a feature considered inconvenient for motorcycle engines.

=== Pulse jets ===
Reed valves are used in the cheap but inefficient pulse jet engine, such as the one used by the Argus As 014 engine in the German V-1 (flying bomb). The valves at the front of the cylindrical engine are opened by the low pressure in the combustion chamber caused by the resonance of the air column in the engine, fuel is squirted into the combustion chamber and ignited by the hot combustion gases of the previous cycle. Once the charge has expanded and mostly left the engine, pressure inside drops again to below-atmospheric values and the reed valve allows fresh air to enter and the cycle be repeated. Some ram-air pressure due to forward motion helps scavenging and filling the combustion chamber with the new, fresh air charge, thus improving the power of the engine at higher speeds.

== Design and modelling ==
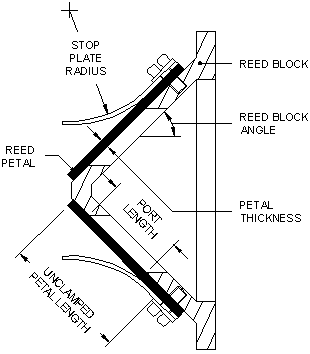
Section of Mota-10 reed valves

Reed valves are designed considering the pressure gradient and mass flow. The pressure gradient is used to evaluate the valve lift during open condition; the lift and overall component geometry (considering also a pressure loss coefficient) are then used to calculate the mass flow. For high speed applications (compressors and engines) the dynamic response has to be considered. A simple approach consists in the evaluation of first eigenvalue that is compared with exciting frequency. Design of reed valves can be refined using simulations. The dynamic of petals can be studied neglecting the coupling between fluid and structure: in this case the evolution of the structural part are simulated using lumped parameters models or FEM models, discharge coefficients at various valve lift are evaluated with experiments or CFD simulations. The study of the complete system needs an integrated Fluid-structure interaction model.

== See also ==
- Check valve
- Reed switch
