= Liquid cooling =

Cooling using a circulating liquid as a heat-exchange medium

Liquid cooling refers to cooling by means of the convection or circulation of a liquid.

Examples of liquid cooling technologies include:

- Cooling by convection or circulation of coolant, including water cooling
- Liquid cooling and ventilation garments, worn by astronauts
- Liquid metal cooled reactors
- Radiators (engine cooling)
- Cooling towers

== Applications ==
=== Computing ===
In computing and electronics, liquid cooling involves the technology that uses a special water block to conduct heat away from the processor as well as the chipset. This method can also be used in combination with other traditional cooling methods such as those that use air. The application to microelectronics is either indirect or direct. The former pertains to the category that utilizes cold plate cooling, which uses water as coolant while, in the latter (also referred to as liquid immersion cooling), the surface of the chips comes in contact with the liquid since there is no wall separating the heat source from the coolant. This immersion cooling also offer a higher transfer coefficient, although this depends on the specific coolant used and mode of convective heat transfer. One of the main benefits achieved is the reduction of noise and it is also more efficient. Some of the drawbacks include the risk entailed with the close proximity of liquid to electronics as well as its cost. Liquid cooling systems are more expensive than fan sets, which require fewer components such as reservoir, pump, water blocks, hose, and radiator.

=== HVAC ===
Liquid cooling is also used to remove heat from large buildings by using chillers which transfer the coolant from the evaporator to air handling units, chilled beams and fan coil units inside the building, and to the cooling towers from the condenser if the condenser is liquid-cooled. Some buildings are directly cooled by the cooling towers using plate heat exchangers transferring the heat from the chiller condenser loop to the evaporator loop. Convective heat transfer is used to cool the coolant if the building uses dry or closed-circuit cooling towers.

=== Liquid cooling garments ===
Liquid Cooling Garments (LCG) are used to decrease the wearer’s bodily temperature and keep them comfortable. Generally, an LCG uses a series of coolant-filled tubes and a refrigeration unit and a pump to move the coolant throughout the system. These parts are usually encased inside of a normal garment, usually a vest. Since the coolant is so close to human skin, water tends to be the preferred coolant, as it is both safe for skin contact and effective at transferring heat. Due to their portable and versatile nature, LCGs have been proposed as a solution to overheating in areas where a standard air conditioning system would not be feasible or where the cooling would need to be under protective gear.
